= List of members of the Storting, 1969–1973 =

List of all members of the Storting in the period 1969 to 1973. The list includes all those initially elected to the Storting.

There were a total of 150 representatives, distributed among the parties: 74 to Norwegian Labour Party, 29 to Conservative Party of Norway, 20 to Centre Party (Norway), 14 to Christian Democratic Party of Norway and 13 to Venstre (Norway).

Venstre was split during the period, and as of December 9, 1972 there were 8 representatives for Det Nye Folkepartiet and therefore 5 representatives for Venstre (Norway).

== Aust-Agder ==
Name	Party	Comments/Suppleant representatives
Osmund Faremo	Norwegian Labour Party	
Thor Lund	Norwegian Labour Party	
Alfred Thommesen	Conservative Party of Norway	
Øyvind Bjorvatn	Venstre (Norway)	Upon split with Venstre, joined Det Nye Folkepartiet.

== Vest-Agder ==
Name	Party	Comments/Suppleant representatives
Salve Andreas Salvesen	Norwegian Labour Party	
Bent Røiseland	Venstre (Norway)	Upon split with Venstre, joined Det Nye Folkepartiet.
Kolbjørn Stordrange	Conservative Party of Norway	
Toralf Westermoen	Christian Democratic Party of Norway	
Jens Haugland	Norwegian Labour Party	

== Akershus ==
Name	Party	Comments/Suppleant representatives
Sonja Aase Ludvigsen	Norwegian Labour Party	
Jo Benkow	Conservative Party of Norway	
Tønnes Madsson Andenæs	Norwegian Labour Party	
Bjørn Unneberg	Centre Party (Norway)	Elected from a joint list consisting of Centre Party/Christian Democratic Party.
Thor Gystad	Norwegian Labour Party	
Rolf Presthus	Conservative Party of Norway	
Halfdan Hegtun	Venstre (Norway)	Upon split with Venstre, joined Det Nye Folkepartiet.

== Bergen ==
Name	Party	Comments/Suppleant representatives
Harry Hansen	Norwegian Labour Party	
Henrik J. Lisæth	Conservative Party of Norway	Elected from a joint list consisting of Conservative Party/Christian Democratic Party
Olav Totland	Norwegian Labour Party	
Asbjørn Haugstvedt	Christian Democratic Party of Norway	Elected from a joint list consisting of Conservative Party/Christian Democratic Party
Gunnar Garbo	Venstre (Norway)	

== Buskerud ==
Name	Party	Comments/Suppleant representatives
Ragnar Karl Viktor Christiansen	Norwegian Labour Party	Appointed to the Cabinet from March 1971 to October 1972, during which time he was replaced by Egil Solin Ranheim.
Tor Oftedal	Norwegian Labour Party	
Bernt Ingvaldsen	Conservative Party of Norway	
Guri Johannessen	Norwegian Labour Party	Died in November 1972. Was replaced by Egil Solin Ranheim.
Erland Steenberg	Centre Party (Norway)	
Gunnar Thorleif Hvashovd	Norwegian Labour Party	
Olaf Knudson	Conservative Party of Norway	

== Finnmark ==
Name	Party	Comments/Suppleant representatives
Valter Gabrielsen	Norwegian Labour Party	
Anders John Aune	Norwegian Labour Party	
Erling Norvik	Conservative Party of Norway	
Annemarie Lorentzen	Norwegian Labour Party	

== Hedmark ==
Name	Party	Comments/Suppleant representatives
Odvar Nordli	Norwegian Labour Party	Appointed to the Cabinet from March 1971 to October 1972, during which time he was replaced by Aage Søgaard.
Lars Holen	Norwegian Labour Party	
Karstein Seland	Centre Party (Norway)	
Kjell Magne Fredheim	Norwegian Labour Party	
Else Repål	Norwegian Labour Party	
Lars T. Platou	Conservative Party of Norway	
Harald Johan Løbak	Norwegian Labour Party	
Johan Østby	Centre Party (Norway)	

== Hordaland ==
Name	Party	Comments/Suppleant representatives
Arne Nilsen	Norwegian Labour Party	
Ingvald Johan Ulveseth	Norwegian Labour Party	
Sverre L. Mo	Christian Democratic Party of Norway	
Kjeld Langeland	Conservative Party of Norway	Died in January 1973. Was replaced by Sigrid Utkilen.
Thor Myklebust	Venstre (Norway)	Upon split with Venstre, joined Det Nye Folkepartiet.
Sverre Helland	Centre Party (Norway)	
Aksel Fossen	Norwegian Labour Party	
Bergfrid Fjose	Christian Democratic Party of Norway	Appointed to the Cabinet from 1972, during which time she was replaced by Gunnar Mjånes.
Per Hysing-Dahl	Conservative Party of Norway	
Olav Marås	Norwegian Labour Party	

== Møre and Romsdal ==
Name	Party	Comments/Suppleant representatives
Alv Jakob Fostervoll	Norwegian Labour Party	Appointed to the Cabinet from March 1971 to October 1972, during which time he was replaced by Oskar Edøy.
Arnt Gudleik Hagen	Centre Party (Norway)	
Odd Vigestad	Christian Democratic Party of Norway	
Bjarne Flem	Venstre (Norway)	
Peter Kjeldseth Moe	Norwegian Labour Party	Died in June 1973. Was replaced by Oskar Edøy.
Kåre Stokkeland	Norwegian Labour Party	
Sverre Bernhard Nybø	Conservative Party of Norway	
Arnold Weiberg-Aurdal	Centre Party (Norway)	
Arne Sæter	Christian Democratic Party of Norway	Died in September 1973. Was replaced by Sverre Moen.
Hans Hammond Rossbach	Venstre (Norway)	

== Nordland ==
Name	Party	Comments/Suppleant representatives
Magnus Andersen	Norwegian Labour Party	Appointed to the Cabinet from January to October 1972, during which time he was replaced by Eindride Sommerseth.
Margith Johanne Munkebye	Norwegian Labour Party	
Per Karstensen	Norwegian Labour Party	
Håkon Kyllingmark	Conservative Party of Norway	Appointed to the Cabinet until 1971, during which time he was replaced by Andreas Grimsø.
Erling Engan	Centre Party (Norway)	
Rolf Hellem	Norwegian Labour Party	
Bjarne Mørk-Eidem	Norwegian Labour Party	
Edmund Fjærvoll	Christian Democratic Party of Norway	
Walter Kåre Tjønndal	Norwegian Labour Party	
Johan Kleppe	Venstre (Norway)	Appointed to the Cabinet from 1972, during which time he was replaced by Kristian Halse.
Bodil Aakre	Conservative Party of Norway	
Willy Arne Wold	Centre Party (Norway)	

== Oppland ==
Name	Party	Comments/Suppleant representatives
Thorstein Treholt	Norwegian Labour Party	
Per Mellesmo	Norwegian Labour Party	
Ola O. Røssum	Centre Party (Norway)	
Liv Andersen	Norwegian Labour Party	
Torger Hovi	Norwegian Labour Party	
Asbjørn Granheim	Centre Party (Norway)	
Rolf Furuseth	Norwegian Labour Party	

== Oslo ==
Name	Party	Comments/Suppleant representatives
Trygve Bratteli	Norwegian Labour Party	Prime Minister from March 1971 to October 1972, during which time he was replaced by Thorbjørn Berntsen.
Kåre Willoch	Conservative Party of Norway	Appointed to the Cabinet until 1970, during which time he was replaced by Jan P. Syse.
Aase Lionæs	Norwegian Labour Party	
Berte Rognerud	Conservative Party of Norway	
Gunnar Alf Larsen	Norwegian Labour Party	
Erling Petersen	Conservative Party of Norway	
Tove Pihl	Norwegian Labour Party	
Egil Aarvik	Christian Democratic Party of Norway	Appointed to the Cabinet until 1971, during which time he was replaced by Kåre Kristiansen.
Paul Thyness	Conservative Party of Norway	
Einar Førde	Norwegian Labour Party	
Helge Seip	Venstre (Norway)	Appointed to the Cabinet until 1970, during which time he was replaced by Olaf Erling Kortner. Upon split with Venstre, joined Det Nye Folkepartiet.
Knut Frydenlund	Norwegian Labour Party	
Lars Roar Langslet	Conservative Party of Norway	

== Rogaland ==
Name	Party	Comments/Suppleant representatives
Peder P. Næsheim	Norwegian Labour Party	Died in November 1969. Was replaced by Lulla Einrid Fossland.
Jakob Aano	Christian Democratic Party of Norway	
Egil Endresen	Conservative Party of Norway	Appointed to the Cabinet from October 1970 to March 1971, during which time he was replaced by Olle Johan Eriksen.
Edvard Magnus Edvardsen	Norwegian Labour Party	
Ingvar Lars Helle	Venstre (Norway)	Upon split with Venstre, joined Det Nye Folkepartiet.
Karl Aasland	Centre Party (Norway)	
Geirmund Ihle	Norwegian Labour Party	
Karl J. Brommeland	Christian Democratic Party of Norway	
Lauritz Bernhard Sirevaag	Conservative Party of Norway	
Gunnar Berge	Norwegian Labour Party	

== Sogn and Fjordane ==
Name	Party	Comments/Suppleant representatives
Sverre Johan Juvik	Norwegian Labour Party	
Knut Myrstad	Christian Democratic Party of Norway	
Paul Svarstad	Conservative Party of Norway	
John Austrheim	Centre Party (Norway)	Appointed to the Cabinet from 1972, during which time he was replaced by Ambjørg Sælthun.
Oddleif Fagerheim	Norwegian Labour Party	

== Telemark ==
Name	Party	Comments/Suppleant representatives
Aslak Versto	Norwegian Labour Party	
Finn Kristensen	Norwegian Labour Party	
Johannes Østtveit	Christian Democratic Party of Norway	Elected from a joint list consisting of Centre Party/Christian Democratic Party.
Eigil Olaf Liane	Norwegian Labour Party	
Hallvard Eika	Venstre (Norway)	Appointed to Cabinet in 1970-1971 and 1972–1973, during which times he was replaced by Sigurd Kalheim. Upon split with Venstre, Kalheim joined Det Nye Folkepartiet.
Torstein Tynning	Conservative Party of Norway	

== Troms ==
Name	Party	Comments/Suppleant representatives
Nils Kristen Jacobsen	Norwegian Labour Party	
Alfred Meyer Henningsen	Norwegian Labour Party	
Asbjørn Sjøthun	Norwegian Labour Party	
Martin Buvik	Conservative Party of Norway	
Johannes Gilleberg	Centre Party (Norway)	Elected from a joint list consisting of Centre Party/Christian Democratic Party.
Helge Jakobsen	Venstre (Norway)	Upon split with Venstre, joined Det Nye Folkepartiet.

== Nord-Trøndelag ==
Name	Party	Comments/Suppleant representatives
Leif Granli	Norwegian Labour Party	
Johan A. Vikan	Centre Party (Norway)	
Guttorm Hansen	Norwegian Labour Party	
Johan Støa	Norwegian Labour Party	
Inge Einarsen Bartnes	Centre Party (Norway)	
Ola H. Kveli	Venstre (Norway)	Upon split with Venstre, joined Det Nye Folkepartiet.

== Sør-Trøndelag ==
Name	Party	Comments/Suppleant representatives
Håkon Johnsen	Norwegian Labour Party	
Roald Åsmund Bye	Norwegian Labour Party	
Otto Lyng	Conservative Party of Norway	
Per Borten	Centre Party (Norway)	Prime Minister until 1971, during which time he was replaced by Johan Syrstad.
Liv Aasen	Norwegian Labour Party	
Rolf Fjeldvær	Norwegian Labour Party	
Kristoffer Rein	Christian Democratic Party of Norway	
Hermund Eian	Conservative Party of Norway	
Einar Hole Moxnes	Centre Party (Norway)	Appointed to the Cabinet until 1971, during which time he was replaced by Olina Storsand, and from 1972, during which time he was replaced by Johan Syrstad.
Arne Kielland	Norwegian Labour Party	Joined the Socialist People's Party on 25 September 1972.

== Vestfold ==
Name	Party	Comments/Suppleant representatives
Asbjørn Lillås	Norwegian Labour Party	
Odd Vattekar	Conservative Party of Norway	
Willy Jansson	Norwegian Labour Party	
Theodor Dyring	Centre Party (Norway)	Elected from a joint list consisting of Centre Party/Christian Democratic Party.
Torgeir Andersen	Conservative Party of Norway	
Astrid Murberg Martinsen	Norwegian Labour Party	
Petter Furberg	Norwegian Labour Party	

== Østfold ==
Name	Party	Comments/Suppleant representatives
Ingvar Bakken	Norwegian Labour Party	
Arvid Johanson	Norwegian Labour Party	
Svenn Thorkild Stray	Conservative Party of Norway	Appointed to the Cabinet between 1970 and 1971, during which time he was replaced by Carl E. Wang.
Martha Frederikke Johannessen	Norwegian Labour Party	Died in September 1973. Was replaced by Liv Stubberud.
Thorbjørn Kultorp	Norwegian Labour Party	
Lars Korvald	Christian Democratic Party of Norway	Prime Minister from 1972, during which time he was replaced by Odd Steinar Holøs.
Anton Skulberg	Centre Party (Norway)	Appointed to the Cabinet from 1972, during which time he was replaced by Einar Brusevold.
Gunnar Skaug	Norwegian Labour Party	
