= List of members of the Storting, 1973–1977 =

List of all members of the Storting in the period 1973 to 1977. The list includes all those initially elected to the Storting.

There were a total of 155 representatives, distributed among the parties: 62 to Norwegian Labour Party, 29 to Conservative Party of Norway, 21 to Centre Party (Norway), 20 to Christian Democratic Party of Norway, 16 to Sosialistisk Valgforbund, 4 to Anders Langes Party, 2 to Venstre (Norway) and 1 to Det Nye FolkePartiet.

== Aust-Agder ==
Name	Party	Comments/Suppleant representatives
Osmund Faremo	Norwegian Labour Party	
Johannes Vågsnes	Christian Democratic Party of Norway	
Astrid Gjertsen	Conservative Party of Norway	
Thor Lund	Norwegian Labour Party	

== Vest-Agder ==
Name	Party	Comments/Suppleant representatives
Engly Lie	Norwegian Labour Party	
Toralf Westermoen	Christian Democratic Party of Norway	
Kolbjørn Stordrange	Conservative Party of Norway	
Odd Lien	Norwegian Labour Party	
Ragnar Udjus	Centre Party (Norway)	

== Akershus ==
Name	Party	Comments/Suppleant representatives
Sonja Aase Ludvigsen	Norwegian Labour Party	Appointed to the Cabinet until her death in July 1974. Was replaced by Thor-Eirik Gulbrandsen.
Jo Benkow	Conservative Party of Norway	
Thor Gystad	Norwegian Labour Party	
Torild Skard	Sosialistisk Valgforbund	
Rolf Presthus	Conservative Party of Norway	
Tønnes Andenæs	Norwegian Labour Party	Died in February 1975. Replaced by Svein Gunnar Morgenlien.
Bjørn Unneberg	Centre Party (Norway)	
Egil Aarvik	Christian Democratic Party of Norway	
Erik Gjems-Onstad	Anders Lange's Party	
Gerd Kirste	Conservative Party of Norway	

== Buskerud ==
Name	Party	Comments/Suppleant representatives
Ragnar Karl Viktor Christiansen	Norwegian Labour Party	
Tor Oftedal	Norwegian Labour Party	
Olaf Knudson	Conservative Party of Norway	
Kåre Øistein Hansen	Sosialistisk Valgforbund	
Gunnar Thorleif Hvashovd	Norwegian Labour Party	
Erland Steenberg	Centre Party (Norway)	
Gunnar Johnsen	Conservative Party of Norway	

== Finnmark ==
Name	Party	Comments/Suppleant representatives
Valter Gabrielsen	Norwegian Labour Party	
Annemarie Lorentzen	Norwegian Labour Party	
Tor Henriksen	Sosialistisk Valgforbund	
Thor Listau	Conservative Party of Norway	

== Hedmark ==
Name	Party	Comments/Suppleant representatives
Odvar Nordli	Norwegian Labour Party	
Lars Holen	Norwegian Labour Party	
Johan Østby	Centre Party (Norway)	Elected on a joint list of the Centre Party (Norway)/Christian Democratic Party of Norway/Venstre (Norway).
Kjell Magne Fredheim	Norwegian Labour Party	
Reidar T. Larsen	Sosialistisk Valgforbund	
Else Repål	Norwegian Labour Party	
Lars T. Platou	Conservative Party of Norway	
Ottar Landfald	Centre Party (Norway)	Elected on a joint list of Centre Party (Norway)/Christian Democratic Party of Norway/Venstre (Norway).

== Hordaland ==
Name	Party	Comments/Suppleant representatives
Harry Hansen	Norwegian Labour Party	
Sverre L. Mo	Christian Democratic Party of Norway	
Per Hysing-Dahl	Conservative Party of Norway	
Arne Nilsen	Norwegian Labour Party	
Einar Nyheim	Sosialistisk Valgforbund	
Bergfrid Fjose	Christian Democratic Party of Norway	Briefly appointed to the Cabinet in early October 1973, before Trygve Bratteli formed his second cabinet. During this short period she was replaced by Magne Haldorsen.
Sigrid Utkilen	Conservative Party of Norway	
Sverre Helland	Centre Party (Norway)	
Margit Tøsdal	Norwegian Labour Party	
Ole Myrvoll	Det Nye FolkePartyet	
Harald Bjarne Slettebø	Anders Langes Party	
Georg Johan Jacobsen	Norwegian Labour Party	
Asbjørn Haugstvedt	Christian Democratic Party of Norway	
Håkon Randal	Conservative Party of Norway	
Aksel Fossen	Norwegian Labour Party	

== Møre and Romsdal ==
Name	Party	Comments/Suppleant representatives
Alv Jakob Fostervoll	Norwegian Labour Party	
Odd Vigestad	Christian Democratic Party of Norway	
Arnt Gudleik Hagen	Centre Party (Norway)	
Arve Berg	Norwegian Labour Party	
Hans Hammond Rossbach	Venstre (Norway)	
Kjell Magne Bondevik	Christian Democratic Party of Norway	
Oddbjørn Sverre Langlo	Conservative Party of Norway	
Arnold Weiberg-Aurdal	Centre Party (Norway)	
Kåre Stokkeland	Norwegian Labour Party	
Ola Langset	Sosialistisk Valgforbund	

== Nordland ==
Name	Party	Comments/Suppleant representatives
Rolf Hellem	Norwegian Labour Party	
Eivind Bolle	Norwegian Labour Party	
Willy Arne Wold	Centre Party (Norway)	
Hanna Kvanmo	Sosialistisk Valgforbund	
Odd With	Christian Democratic Party of Norway	
Håkon Kyllingmark	Conservative Party of Norway	
Bjarne Mørk-Eidem	Norwegian Labour Party	
Per Karstensen	Norwegian Labour Party	
Kåre Rønning	Centre Party (Norway)	
Odin Hansen	Sosialistisk Valgforbund	
Karl Sverre Klevstad	Christian Democratic Party of Norway	
Anne-Lise Steinbach	Norwegian Labour Party	

== Oppland ==
Name	Party	Comments/Suppleant representatives
Thorstein Treholt	Norwegian Labour Party	
Liv Andersen	Norwegian Labour Party	
Ola O. Røssum	Centre Party (Norway)	Elected on a joint list of Centre Party (Norway)/Venstre (Norway).
Per Mellesmo	Norwegian Labour Party	
Bodil Finsveen	Centre Party (Norway)	Elected on a joint list of Centre Party (Norway)/Venstre (Norway).
Rolf Furuseth	Norwegian Labour Party	
Harald U. Lied	Conservative Party of Norway	

== Oslo ==
Name	Party	Comments/Suppleant representatives
Trygve Bratteli	Norwegian Labour Party	
Kåre Willoch	Conservative Party of Norway	
Aase Lionæs	Norwegian Labour Party	
Karin Hafstad	Conservative Party of Norway	
Finn Rudolf Gustavsen	Sosialistisk Valgforbund	
Gunnar Alf Larsen	Norwegian Labour Party	
Paul Thyness	Conservative Party of Norway	
Kåre Kristiansen	Christian Democratic Party of Norway	
Haldis Havrøy	Norwegian Labour Party	
Anders Lange	Anders Langes Party	
Berit Ås	Sosialistisk Valgforbund	
Lars Roar Langslet	Conservative Party of Norway	
Einar Førde	Norwegian Labour Party	
Jan P. Syse	Conservative Party of Norway	
Knut Frydenlund	Norwegian Labour Party	

== Rogaland ==
Name	Party	Comments/Suppleant representatives
Gunnar Berge	Norwegian Labour Party	
Jakob Aano	Christian Democratic Party of Norway	
Lauritz Bernhard Sirevaag	Conservative Party of Norway	
Geirmund Ihle	Norwegian Labour Party	
Karl Aasland	Centre Party (Norway)	
Knut Haus	Christian Democratic Party of Norway	
Berge Furre	Sosialistisk Valgforbund	
Erling Erland	Anders Langes Party	
Edvard Magnus Edvardsen	Norwegian Labour Party	
Kristin Kverneland Lønningdal	Conservative Party of Norway	

== Sogn and Fjordane ==
Name	Party	Comments/Suppleant representatives
Sverre Johan Juvik	Norwegian Labour Party	
John Austrheim	Centre Party (Norway)	Briefly appointed to the Cabinet in early October 1973, before Trygve Bratteli formed his second cabinet. During this short period he was replaced by Leiv Erdal.
Knut Myrstad	Christian Democratic Party of Norway	
Oddleif Fagerheim	Norwegian Labour Party	
Ambjørg Sælthun	Centre Party (Norway)	

== Telemark ==
Name	Party	Comments/Suppleant representatives
Aslak Versto	Norwegian Labour Party	
Finn Kristensen	Norwegian Labour Party	
Arne Kielland	Sosialistisk Valgforbund	
Jørgen Sønstebø	Christian Democratic Party of Norway	
Hallvard Eika	Venstre (Norway)	Elected on a joint list with Centre Party (Norway)/Venstre (Norway). Briefly appointed to the Cabinet in early October 1973, before Trygve Bratteli formed his second cabinet. During this short period he was replaced by Eivind Øygarden.
Torstein Tynning	Conservative Party of Norway	

== Troms ==
Name	Party	Comments/Suppleant representatives
Asbjørn Sjøthun	Norwegian Labour Party	
Johannes Gilleberg	Centre Party (Norway)	Valgt på fellesliste Centre Party (Norway)/Venstre (Norway).
Kirsten Myklevoll	Norwegian Labour Party	
Martin Buvik	Conservative Party of Norway	
Ottar Brox	Sosialistisk Valgforbund	
Per Almar Aas	Christian Democratic Party of Norway	

== Nord-Trøndelag ==
Name	Party	Comments/Suppleant representatives
Guttorm Hansen	Norwegian Labour Party	
Johan A. Vikan	Centre Party (Norway)	Elected on a joint list of Centre Party (Norway)/Venstre (Norway).
Johan Støa	Norwegian Labour Party	Died in September 1973. Replaced by Asbjørn Mathisen and then Steiner Arvid Kvalø.
Johan J. Jakobsen	Centre Party (Norway)	Elected on a joint list of Centre Party (Norway)/Venstre (Norway).
Ottar Gravås	Christian Democratic Party of Norway	Elected on a joint list of Conservative Party of Norway/Christian Democratic Party of Norway.
Johnny Stenberg	Norwegian Labour Party	

== Sør-Trøndelag ==
Name	Party	Comments/Suppleant representatives
Liv Aasen	Norwegian Labour Party	
Roald Åsmund Bye	Norwegian Labour Party	
Otto Lyng	Conservative Party of Norway	
Kai Øverland	Sosialistisk Valgforbund	Died in August 1975, was replaced by Aud Gustad
Per Borten	Centre Party (Norway)	
Kjell Helland	Norwegian Labour Party	
Jens P. Flå	Christian Democratic Party of Norway	
Hermund Eian	Conservative Party of Norway	
Rolf Fjeldvær	Norwegian Labour Party	
Arent M. Henriksen	Sosialistisk Valgforbund	

== Vestfold ==
Name	Party	Comments/Suppleant representatives
Astrid Murberg Martinsen	Norwegian Labour Party	
Odd Vattekar	Conservative Party of Norway	
Petter Furberg	Norwegian Labour Party	
Torgeir Andersen	Conservative Party of Norway	
Aslaug Fadum	Centre Party (Norway)	Elected on a joint list of Centre Party (Norway)/Venstre (Norway).
Åge Ramberg	Christian Democratic Party of Norway	
Alf Martin Bjørnø	Norwegian Labour Party	

== Østfold ==
Name	Party	Comments/Suppleant representatives
Ingvar Bakken	Norwegian Labour Party	
Arvid Johanson	Norwegian Labour Party	
Svenn Thorkild Stray	Conservative Party of Norway	
Lars Korvald	Christian Democratic Party of Norway	Briefly Prime Minister in early October 1973, before Trygve Bratteli formed his second cabinet. During this short period he was replaced by Odd Steinar Holøs.
Liv Stubberud	Norwegian Labour Party	
Otto Hauglin	Sosialistisk Valgforbund	
Anton Skulberg	Centre Party (Norway)	Briefly appointed to the Cabinet in early October 1973, before Trygve Bratteli formed his second cabinet. During this short period he was replaced by Birgit Wiig.
Thorbjørn Kultorp	Norwegian Labour Party	
