= List of members of the Storting, 1997–2001 =

List of all the members of the Storting in the period 1997 to 2001. The list includes all those initially elected to the Storting.

. The list includes all those elected to Stortinget.

There were a total of 165 representatives, distributed among 65 to Norwegian Labour Party, 25 to Christian Democrats, 25 to Progress Party, 23 to Conservative Party, 11 to Centre Party, 9 to Socialist Left Party, 6 to Venstre and 1 to the Coastal Party.

The 8 Leveling seats went to Akershus (2), Hedmark (1), Hordaland (1), Oslo (2) and Rogaland (2).

== Aust-Agder ==
Name	Party	Comments
Gunnar Halvorsen	Norwegian Labour Party	
Åse Gunhild Woie Duesund	Christian Democrats	
Torbjørn Andersen	Progress Party	
Liv Marit Moland	Norwegian Labour Party	

== Vest-Agder ==
Name	Party	Comments
Jon Lilletun	Christian Democrats	Appointed to the cabinet. Dagrun Eriksen became his representative.
Aud Blattmann	Norwegian Labour Party	
Vidar Kleppe	Progress Party	
Ansgar Gabrielsen	Conservative Party	
Anne Brit Stråtveit	Christian Democrats	

== Akershus ==
2 Leveling seats.

Name	Party	Comments
Anneliese Dørum	Norwegian Labour Party	Died 4 November 2000, Rikke Lind took her place
Jan Petersen	Conservative Party	
Fridtjof Frank Gundersen	Progress Party	Independent from 5 February 2001.
Vidar Bjørnstad	Norwegian Labour Party	
Sonja Irene Sjøli	Conservative Party	
Kjell Engebretsen	Norwegian Labour Party	
Valgerd Svarstad Haugland	Christian Democrats	Appointed to cabinet. Einar Holstad became his representative.
Ursula Evje	Progress Party	
Grethe Fossli	Norwegian Labour Party	
Jan Tore Sanner	Conservative Party	
Rolf Reikvam	Socialist Left Party	
Sverre Myrli	Norwegian Labour Party	
Terje Johansen	Venstre	
Anne Enger Lahnstein	Centre Party	Appointed to the cabinet. Tron Erik Hovind became her representative.

== Buskerud ==
Name	Party	Comments
Thorbjørn Jagland	Norwegian Labour Party	Appointed to cabinet. Frank Willy Larsen became his representative.
Kirsti Kolle Grøndahl	Norwegian Labour Party	
Ulf Erik Knudsen	Progress Party	
Trond Helleland	Conservative Party	
Erik Dalheim	Norwegian Labour Party	
Finn Kristian Marthinsen	Christian Democrats	
Sigrun Eng	Norwegian Labour Party	

== Finnmark ==
Name	Party	Comments
Karl Eirik Schjøtt-Pedersen	Norwegian Labour Party	Appointed to cabinet. Alf E. Jakobsen became his representative.
Mimmi Bæivi	Norwegian Labour Party	
Olav Gunnar Ballo	Socialist Left Party	
Randi Karlstrøm	Christian Democrats	

== Hedmark ==
1 Leveling seat.

Name	Party	Comments
Sylvia Brustad	Norwegian Labour Party	Appointed to cabinet. Erling Brandsnes became her representative.
Einar Olav Skogholt	Norwegian Labour Party	
Eirin Faldet	Norwegian Labour Party	
Ola D. Gløtvold	Centre Party	
Per Roar Bredvold	Progress Party	
Grethe G. Fossum	Norwegian Labour Party	
Åse Wisløff Nilssen	Christian Democrats	
Bjørn Hernæs	Conservative Party	
Karin Andersen	Socialist Left Party	

== Hordaland ==
1 Leveling seat.

Name	Party	Comments
Grete Knudsen	Norwegian Labour Party	Appointed to cabinet. Gard Folkvord became her representative.
Are Næss	Christian Democrats	
Hans J. Røsjorde	Progress Party	
Ranveig Frøiland	Norwegian Labour Party	
Oddvard Nilsen	Conservative Party	
Olav Akselsen	Norwegian Labour Party	Appointed to cabinet. Sigurd Grytten became his representative.
Anita Apelthun Sæle	Christian Democrats	
Terje Knudsen	Progress Party	Independent since 16 March 2001.
Lars Sponheim	Venstre	Appointed to cabinet. Harald Hove became his representative.
Erna Solberg	Conservative Party	
John Dale	Centre Party	
Leif Lund	Norwegian Labour Party	
Ågot Valle	Socialist Left Party	
Rita Tveiten	Norwegian Labour Party	
Ingebrigt S. Sørfonn	Christian Democrats	
May Britt Vihovde	Venstre	

== Møre og Romsdal ==
Name	Party	Comments
Laila Kaland	Norwegian Labour Party	
Kjell Magne Bondevik	Christian Democrats	Statsminister i regjeringen Bondevik 1. Modulf Aukan møtte.
Lodve Solholm	Progress Party	
Asmund Kristoffersen	Norwegian Labour Party	
Petter Løvik	Conservative Party	
May-Helen Molvær Grimstad	Christian Democrats	
Gudmund Restad	Centre Party	Appointed to cabinet. Jørgen Holte became his representative.
Karita Bekkemellem Orheim	Norwegian Labour Party	Appointed to cabinet. Ottar Kaldhol became her representative.
Leif Helge Kongshaug	Venstre	
Harald T. Nesvik	Progress Party	

== Nordland ==
Name	Party	Comments
Hill-Marta Solberg	Norwegian Labour Party	
Gunnar Breimo	Norwegian Labour Party	
Jan Sahl	Christian Democrats	
Kenneth Svendsen	Progress Party	
Odd Roger Enoksen	Centre Party	
Torny Pedersen	Norwegian Labour Party	
Ivar Kristiansen	Conservative Party	
Inge Myrvoll	Socialist Left Party	
Odd Eriksen	Norwegian Labour Party	
Steinar Bastesen	Coastal Party	Tverrpolitisk Folkevalgte
Kari Økland	Christian Democrats	
Tomas Norvoll	Norwegian Labour Party	

== Oppland ==
Name	Party	Comments
Haakon Blankenborg	Norwegian Labour Party	
Berit Brørby	Norwegian Labour Party	
Marit Tingelstad	Centre Party	
Torstein Rudihagen	Norwegian Labour Party	
Rigmor Kofoed-Larsen	Christian Democrats	
Thore A. Nistad	Progress Party	
Reidun Gravdahl	Norwegian Labour Party	

== Oslo ==
2 Leveling seats.

Name	Party	Comments
Jens Stoltenberg	Norwegian Labour Party	Appointed to cabinet. Anders Hornslien became his representative.
Per-Kristian Foss	Conservative Party	
Carl I. Hagen	Progress Party	
Marit Nybakk	Norwegian Labour Party	
Kristin Krohn Devold	Conservative Party	
Bjørn Tore Godal	Norwegian Labour Party	Appointed to cabinet. Shahbaz Tariq became his representative.
Kristin Halvorsen	Socialist Left Party	
Dag Danielsen	Progress Party	Independent since 2 February 2001.
Lars Rise	Christian Democrats	
Britt Hildeng	Norwegian Labour Party	
Inge Lønning	Conservative Party	
Rune E. Kristiansen	Norwegian Labour Party	
Siv Jensen	Progress Party	
Annelise Høegh	Conservative Party	
Inger Lise Husøy	Norwegian Labour Party	
Odd Einar Dørum	Venstre	Appointed to cabinet. Helene Falch Fladmark became his representative.
Erik Solheim	Socialist Left Party	

== Rogaland ==
2 Leveling seats.

Name	Party	Comments
Tore Nordtun	Norwegian Labour Party	
Einar Steensnæs	Christian Democrats	Deputy representative: Anne Sofie Berge
Jan Simonsen	Progress Party	
Jan Johnsen	Conservative Party	
Oddbjørg Ausdal Starrfelt	Norwegian Labour Party	
Hilde Frafjord Johnson	Christian Democrats	Appointed to cabinet. Olaf Gjedrem became her representative.
Øyvind Vaksdal	Progress Party	
Jan Petter Rasmussen	Norwegian Labour Party	
Magnhild Meltveit Kleppa	Centre Party	Appointed to cabinet. Unn Aarrestad became his representative.
Inger Stolt-Nielsen	Conservative Party	Coastal Party fra 21. mars 2001.
Gunnar Kvassheim	Venstre	
Hallgeir H. Langeland	Socialist Left Party	

== Sogn og Fjordane ==
Name	Party	Comments
Kjell Opseth	Norwegian Labour Party	
Lars Gunnar Lie	Christian Democrats	
Jorunn Ringstad	Centre Party	
Astrid Marie Nistad	Norwegian Labour Party	
Sverre J. Hoddevik	Conservative Party	

== Telemark ==
Name	Party	Comments
Sigvald Oppebøen Hansen	Norwegian Labour Party	
Gunn Olsen	Norwegian Labour Party	
John I. Alvheim	Progress Party	
Bror Yngve Rahm	Christian Democrats	
Bent Hegna	Norwegian Labour Party	
Ingvald Godal	Conservative Party	

== Troms ==
Name	Party	Comments
Bendiks H. Arnesen	Norwegian Labour Party	
Synnøve Konglevoll	Norwegian Labour Party	
Ivar Østberg	Christian Democrats	
Øyvind Korsberg	Progress Party	
Tor Nymo	Centre Party	
Svein Ludvigsen	Conservative Party	

== Nord-Trøndelag ==
Name	Party	Comments
Bjarne Håkon Hanssen	Norwegian Labour Party	Appointed to cabinet. Karin Kjølmoen became his representative.
Johan J. Jakobsen	Centre Party	
Aud Gaundal	Norwegian Labour Party	
Arne Lyngstad	Christian Democrats	
Jon Olav Alstad	Norwegian Labour Party	
Per Sandberg	Progress Party	

== Sør-Trøndelag ==
Name	Party	Comments
Gunhild Øyangen	Norwegian Labour Party	
Trond Giske	Norwegian Labour Party	Appointed to cabinet. Tore Nordseth became his representative.
Børge Brende	Conservative Party	
Christopher Stensaker	Progress Party	
Ola T. Lånke	Christian Democrats	
Gunn Karin Gjul	Norwegian Labour Party	
Morten Lund	Centre Party	
Ola Røtvei	Norwegian Labour Party	
Øystein Djupedal	Socialist Left Party	
Siri Frost Sterri	Conservative Party	

== Vestfold ==
Name	Party	Comments
Jørgen Kosmo	Norwegian Labour Party	Appointed to cabinet. Karin Lian became his representative.
Per Ove Width	Progress Party	
Ole Johs. Brunæs	Conservative Party	
Anne Helen Rui	Norwegian Labour Party	
Elsa Skarbøvik	Christian Democrats	
Dag Terje Andersen	Norwegian Labour Party	
Per Erik Monsen	Progress Party	

== Østfold ==
Valgte representatives:

Name	Party	Comments
Gunnar Skaug	Norwegian Labour Party	
Ane Sofie Tømmerås	Norwegian Labour Party	
Øystein Hedstrøm	Progress Party	
Odd Holten	Christian Democrats	
Kjellaug Nakkim	Conservative Party	
Tom Thoresen	Norwegian Labour Party	
Signe Øye	Norwegian Labour Party	
Jørn L. Stang	Progress Party	Independent since 22 March 2001.
