= Hedmark (Storting constituency) =

Constituency of the Storting, the national legislature of Norway

- Constituency for the Storting
- Location of Hedmark within Norway
- Municipality: List: Alvdal; Åmot; Åsnes; Eidskog; Elverum; Engerdal; Folldal; Grue; Hamar; Kongsvinger; Løten; Nord-Odal; Os; Rendalen; Ringsaker; Sør-Odal; Stange; Stor-Elvdal; Tolga; Trysil; Tynset; Våler
- County: Innlandet
- Population: 203,059 (2025)
- Electorate: 155,153 (2025)
- Area: 27,398 km^{2} (2025)

Current constituency
- Created: 1921
- Seats: List: 6 (2013–present); 7 (2005–2013); 8 (1953–2005); 7 (1921–1953)
- Members of the Storting: List: Farahnaz Bahrami (Ap); Even Eriksen (Ap); Tor André Johnsen (FrP); Morten Kolbjørnsen (FrP); Anna Molberg (H); Lise Selnes (Ap); Trygve Slagsvold Vedum (Sp)
- Created from: List: North Hedemarken; North Østerdalen; Solør; South Hedemarken; South Østerdalen; Vinger and Odalen

Hedmark is one of the 19 multi-member constituencies of the Storting, the national legislature of Norway. The constituency was established in 1921 following the introduction of proportional representation for elections to the Storting. It consists of the municipalities of Alvdal, Åmot, Åsnes, Eidskog, Elverum, Engerdal, Folldal, Grue, Hamar, Kongsvinger, Løten, Nord-Odal, Os, Rendalen, Ringsaker, Sør-Odal, Stange, Stor-Elvdal, Tolga, Trysil, Tynset and Våler in the county of Innlandet. The constituency currently elects six of the 169 members of the Storting using the open party-list proportional representation electoral system. At the 2025 parliamentary election it had 155,153 registered electors.

== Electoral system ==
Hedmark currently elects six of the 169 members of the Storting using the open (Note: Although technically elections to the Storting have open lists, they are in effect closed lists as a majority of those voting for a party must make changes to the lists for the changes to take effect, which has never happened since the introduction of proportional representation in 1921, and as result candidates are elected in the order submitted by the party.) party-list proportional representation electoral system. Constituency seats are allocated by the County Electoral Committee using the Modified Sainte-Laguë method. Compensatory seats (seats at large or levelling seats) are calculated based on the national vote and are allocated by the National Electoral Committee using the Modified Sainte-Laguë method at the constituency level (one for each constituency). Only parties that reach the 4% national threshold compete for compensatory seats.

== Election results ==
=== Summary ===
Election	Communists K			Reds R / RV / FMS			Socialist Left SV / SF			Labour Ap			Greens MDG			Centre Sp / Bp / L			Liberals V			Christian Democrats KrF			Conservatives H			Progress FrP / ALP		
Election	Votes	%	Seats	Votes	%	Seats	Votes	%	Seats	Votes	%	Seats	Votes	%	Seats	Votes	%	Seats	Votes	%	Seats	Votes	%	Seats	Votes	%	Seats	Votes	%	Seats
2025				5,711	4.78%	0	5,357	4.48%	0	41,814	34.97%	3	3,407	2.85%	0	16,298	13.63%	1	2,296	1.92%	0	2,607	2.18%	0	10,756	9.00%	0	25,203	21.08%	2
2021				3,876	3.37%	0	7,902	6.86%	0	38,136	33.12%	3	2,382	2.07%	0	32,286	28.04%	2	2,642	2.29%	0	1,876	1.63%	0	12,191	10.59%	1	9,696	8.42%	0
2017				1,443	1.26%	0	6,528	5.72%	0	40,561	35.55%	2	2,215	1.94%	0	25,296	22.17%	2	2,659	2.33%	0	2,051	1.80%	0	17,454	15.30%	1	13,376	11.73%	1
2013				773	0.69%	0	4,393	3.90%	0	48,694	43.20%	3	2,224	1.97%	0	11,483	10.19%	1	3,805	3.38%	0	2,871	2.55%	0	20,600	18.27%	1	15,316	13.59%	1
2009				630	0.58%	0	7,078	6.56%	0	50,855	47.10%	4	347	0.32%	0	11,096	10.28%	1	2,650	2.45%	0	2,652	2.46%	0	10,994	10.18%	1	19,326	17.90%	1
2005	100	0.09%	0	560	0.51%	0	9,650	8.77%	1	50,484	45.89%	4				11,304	10.28%	1	3,965	3.60%	0	3,519	3.20%	0	8,845	8.04%	0	18,717	17.01%	1
2001	179	0.17%	0	405	0.38%	0	14,567	13.65%	1	40,125	37.61%	3	111	0.10%	0	9,660	9.06%	1	2,255	2.11%	0	8,259	7.74%	1	13,522	12.68%	1	11,814	11.07%	1
1997	148	0.13%	0	769	0.68%	0	8,782	7.78%	0	53,035	47.00%	4	139	0.12%	0	14,760	13.08%	1	2,680	2.37%	0	9,742	8.63%	1	8,932	7.92%	1	12,467	11.05%	1
1993	115	0.10%	0	354	0.32%	0	11,689	10.46%	1	54,542	48.82%	4				23,854	21.35%	2	2,234	2.00%	0	3,233	2.89%	0	9,414	8.43%	1	4,044	3.62%	0
1989				453	0.37%	0	14,316	11.78%	1	63,427	52.19%	5	471	0.39%	0	12,324	10.14%	1	1,893	1.56%	0	4,152	3.42%	0	14,726	12.12%	1	9,689	7.97%	0
1985	321	0.26%	0	257	0.21%	0	10,118	8.22%	1	71,924	58.41%	5				11,851	9.62%	1	1,582	1.28%	0	3,842	3.12%	0	20,658	16.78%	1	2,062	1.67%	0
1981	618	0.52%	0	408	0.34%	0	9,302	7.78%	0	66,930	56.01%	5				17,986	15.05%	1							20,991	17.57%	2	2,718	2.27%	0
1977	800	0.71%	0	266	0.24%	0	6,770	6.02%	0	67,684	60.15%	6				15,069	13.39%	1	1,359	1.21%	0	6,463	5.74%	0	12,493	11.10%	1	915	0.81%	0
1973				309	0.29%	0	14,707	13.69%	1	55,857	51.99%	4				21,783	20.27%	2							10,872	10.12%	1	2,488	2.32%	0
1969	2,943	2.71%	0				3,741	3.44%	0	66,691	61.31%	5				19,298	17.74%	2	2,613	2.40%	0	2,307	2.12%	0	11,188	10.28%	1			
1965	5,703	5.47%	0				5,344	5.13%	0	59,484	57.07%	5				20,173	19.36%	2	2,666	2.56%	0				10,853	10.41%	1			
1961	8,067	8.42%	0							57,498	60.00%	5				17,318	18.07%	2	3,244	3.39%	0				9,691	10.11%	1			
1957	7,674	8.15%	1							56,004	59.51%	5				15,023	15.96%	1	2,212	2.35%	0	3,604	3.83%	0	9,213	9.79%	1			
1953	9,977	10.41%	1							57,065	59.56%	5				15,084	15.74%	1	3,311	3.46%	0				10,365	10.82%	1			
1949	10,089	11.78%	0							50,638	59.15%	5				24,417	28.52%	2												
1945	15,057	19.46%	1							41,608	53.79%	4				10,137	13.10%	1	3,891	5.03%	0				6,663	8.61%	1			
1936										43,494	61.07%	5				13,129	18.43%	1	4,637	6.51%	0				7,011	9.84%	1			
1933	2,583	4.05%	0							34,330	53.80%	5				13,666	21.42%	2	5,849	9.17%	0				5,889	9.23%	0			
1930	2,711	4.41%	0							27,876	45.36%	4				16,082	26.17%	2	6,495	10.57%	0				8,288	13.49%	1			
1927	7,096	13.12%	1							22,149	40.94%	3				12,889	23.82%	2	4,231	7.82%	0				6,870	12.70%	1			
1924	10,007	19.31%	1							11,638	22.46%	2				11,921	23.00%	2	5,540	10.69%	0				11,568	22.32%	2			
1921										17,799	36.81%	3				7,955	16.45%	1	4,675	9.67%	1				13,124	27.14%	2			

(Excludes compensatory seats. Figures in italics represent joint lists.)

=== Detailed ===
==== 2020s ====
===== 2025 =====
Results of the 2025 parliamentary election held on 8 September 2025:

Party		Votes	%	Seats		
Party		Votes	%	Con.	Com.	Tot.
Labour Party	Ap	41,814	34.97%	3	0	3
Progress Party	FrP	25,203	21.08%	2	0	2
Centre Party	Sp	16,298	13.63%	1	0	1
Conservative Party	H	10,756	9.00%	0	1	1
Red Party	R	5,711	4.78%	0	0	0
Socialist Left Party	SV	5,357	4.48%	0	0	0
Green Party	MDG	3,407	2.85%	0	0	0
Christian Democratic Party	KrF	2,607	2.18%	0	0	0
Liberal Party	V	2,296	1.92%	0	0	0
Pensioners' Party	PP	2,292	1.92%	0	0	0
Norway Democrats	ND	1,281	1.07%	0	0	0
Industry and Business Party	INP	739	0.62%	0	0	0
Generation Party	GP	727	0.61%	0	0	0
Conservative	K	329	0.28%	0	0	0
Peace and Justice	FOR	265	0.22%	0	0	0
Welfare and Innovation Party	VIP	188	0.16%	0	0	0
DNI Party	DNI	170	0.14%	0	0	0
Center Party	PS	137	0.11%	0	0	0
Valid votes		119,577	100.00%	6	1	7
Blank votes		1,395	1.15%			
Rejected votes – other		167	0.14%			
Total polled		121,139	78.08%			
Registered electors		155,153				

The following candidates were elected:

- Constituency seats - Even Eriksen (Ap); Tor André Johnsen (FrP); Morten Kolbjørnsen (FrP); Nils Kristen Sandtrøen (Ap); Lise Selnes (Ap); and Trygve Slagsvold Vedum (Sp).
- Compensatory seat - Anna Molberg (H).

===== 2021 =====
Results of the 2021 parliamentary election held on 13 September 2021:

Party		Votes	%	Seats		
Party		Votes	%	Con.	Com.	Tot.
Labour Party	Ap	38,136	33.12%	3	0	3
Centre Party	Sp	32,286	28.04%	2	0	2
Conservative Party	H	12,191	10.59%	1	0	1
Progress Party	FrP	9,696	8.42%	0	1	1
Socialist Left Party	SV	7,902	6.86%	0	0	0
Red Party	R	3,876	3.37%	0	0	0
Liberal Party	V	2,642	2.29%	0	0	0
Green Party	MDG	2,382	2.07%	0	0	0
Christian Democratic Party	KrF	1,876	1.63%	0	0	0
Pensioners' Party	PP	1,482	1.29%	0	0	0
Democrats in Norway		1,355	1.18%	0	0	0
Health Party		293	0.25%	0	0	0
The Christians	PDK	219	0.19%	0	0	0
Center Party		210	0.18%	0	0	0
Industry and Business Party	INP	172	0.15%	0	0	0
Capitalist Party		135	0.12%	0	0	0
Alliance - Alternative for Norway		100	0.09%	0	0	0
Save Nature		97	0.08%	0	0	0
People's Action No to More Road Tolls	FNB	81	0.07%	0	0	0
Valid votes		115,131	100.00%	6	1	7
Blank votes		761	0.66%			
Rejected votes – other		112	0.10%			
Total polled		116,004	76.20%			
Registered electors		152,228				

The following candidates were elected:

- Constituency seats - Emilie Enger Mehl (Sp); Anna Molberg (H); Nils Kristen Sandtrøen (Ap); Lise Selnes (Ap); Anette Trettebergstuen (Ap); and Trygve Slagsvold Vedum (Sp).
- Compensatory seat - Tor André Johnsen (FrP).

==== 2010s ====
===== 2017 =====
Results of the 2017 parliamentary election held on 11 September 2017:

Party		Votes	%	Seats		
Party		Votes	%	Con.	Com.	Tot.
Labour Party	Ap	40,561	35.55%	2	0	2
Centre Party	Sp	25,296	22.17%	2	0	2
Conservative Party	H	17,454	15.30%	1	0	1
Progress Party	FrP	13,376	11.73%	1	0	1
Socialist Left Party	SV	6,528	5.72%	0	1	1
Liberal Party	V	2,659	2.33%	0	0	0
Green Party	MDG	2,215	1.94%	0	0	0
Christian Democratic Party	KrF	2,051	1.80%	0	0	0
Red Party	R	1,443	1.26%	0	0	0
Pensioners' Party	PP	1,303	1.14%	0	0	0
Health Party		356	0.31%	0	0	0
Democrats in Norway		192	0.17%	0	0	0
Capitalist Party		165	0.14%	0	0	0
The Christians	PDK	165	0.14%	0	0	0
Norway Party		151	0.13%	0	0	0
The Alliance		120	0.11%	0	0	0
Coastal Party	KP	45	0.04%	0	0	0
Valid votes		114,080	100.00%	6	1	7
Blank votes		857	0.74%			
Rejected votes – other		182	0.16%			
Total polled		115,119	76.79%			
Registered electors		149,920				

The following candidates were elected:

- Constituency seats - Tor André Johnsen (FrP); Emilie Enger Mehl (Sp); Kristian Tonning Riise (H); Nils Kristen Sandtrøen (Ap); Anette Trettebergstuen (Ap); and Trygve Slagsvold Vedum (Sp).
- Compensatory seat - Karin Andersen (SV).

===== 2013 =====
Results of the 2013 parliamentary election held on 8 and 9 September 2013:

Party		Votes	%	Seats		
Party		Votes	%	Con.	Com.	Tot.
Labour Party	Ap	48,694	43.20%	3	0	3
Conservative Party	H	20,600	18.27%	1	0	1
Progress Party	FrP	15,316	13.59%	1	0	1
Centre Party	Sp	11,483	10.19%	1	0	1
Socialist Left Party	SV	4,393	3.90%	0	1	1
Liberal Party	V	3,805	3.38%	0	0	0
Christian Democratic Party	KrF	2,871	2.55%	0	0	0
Green Party	MDG	2,224	1.97%	0	0	0
Pensioners' Party	PP	1,719	1.52%	0	0	0
Red Party	R	773	0.69%	0	0	0
The Christians	PDK	414	0.37%	0	0	0
Pirate Party of Norway		311	0.28%	0	0	0
Democrats in Norway		63	0.06%	0	0	0
Coastal Party	KP	57	0.05%	0	0	0
Valid votes		112,723	100.00%	6	1	7
Blank votes		665	0.59%			
Rejected votes – other		102	0.09%			
Total polled		113,490	76.63%			
Registered electors		148,098				

The following candidates were elected:

- Constituency seats - Gunnar Gundersen (H); Tor André Johnsen (FrP); Tone Sønsterud (Ap); Knut Storberget (Ap); Anette Trettebergstuen (Ap); and Trygve Slagsvold Vedum (Sp).
- Compensatory seat - Karin Andersen (SV).

==== 2000s ====
===== 2009 =====
Results of the 2009 parliamentary election held on 13 and 14 September 2009:

Party		Votes	%	Seats		
Party		Votes	%	Con.	Com.	Tot.
Labour Party	Ap	50,855	47.10%	4	0	4
Progress Party	FrP	19,326	17.90%	1	0	1
Centre Party	Sp	11,096	10.28%	1	0	1
Conservative Party	H	10,994	10.18%	1	0	1
Socialist Left Party	SV	7,078	6.56%	0	1	1
Christian Democratic Party	KrF	2,652	2.46%	0	0	0
Liberal Party	V	2,650	2.45%	0	0	0
Pensioners' Party	PP	2,119	1.96%	0	0	0
Red Party	R	630	0.58%	0	0	0
Green Party	MDG	347	0.32%	0	0	0
Coastal Party	KP	86	0.08%	0	0	0
Democrats in Norway		75	0.07%	0	0	0
Liberal People's Party	DLF	58	0.05%	0	0	0
Valid votes		107,966	100.00%	7	1	8
Blank votes		631	0.58%			
Rejected votes – other		56	0.05%			
Total polled		108,653	74.09%			
Registered electors		146,649				

The following candidates were elected:

- Constituency seats - Per Roar Bredvold (FrP); Thomas Breen (Ap); Gunnar Gundersen (H); Tone Sønsterud (Ap);

Knut Storberget (Ap); Anette Trettebergstuen (Ap); and Trygve Slagsvold Vedum (Sp).

- Compensatory seat - Karin Andersen (SV).

===== 2005 =====
Results of the 2005 parliamentary election held on 11 and 12 September 2005:

Party		Votes	%	Seats		
Party		Votes	%	Con.	Com.	Tot.
Labour Party	Ap	50,484	45.89%	4	0	4
Progress Party	FrP	18,717	17.01%	1	0	1
Centre Party	Sp	11,304	10.28%	1	0	1
Socialist Left Party	SV	9,650	8.77%	1	0	1
Conservative Party	H	8,845	8.04%	0	1	1
Liberal Party	V	3,965	3.60%	0	0	0
Christian Democratic Party	KrF	3,519	3.20%	0	0	0
Pensioners' Party	PP	2,492	2.27%	0	0	0
Red Electoral Alliance	RV	560	0.51%	0	0	0
Coastal Party	KP	233	0.21%	0	0	0
Communist Party of Norway	K	100	0.09%	0	0	0
Christian Unity Party	KSP	87	0.08%	0	0	0
Democrats		49	0.04%	0	0	0
Valid votes		110,005	100.00%	7	1	8
Blank votes		580	0.52%			
Rejected votes – other		96	0.09%			
Total polled		110,681	76.21%			
Registered electors		145,239				

The following candidates were elected:

- Constituency seats - Karin Andersen (SV); Per Roar Bredvold (FrP); Sylvia Brustad (Ap); Eirin Faldet (Ap); Knut Storberget (Ap); Anette Trettebergstuen (Ap); and Trygve Slagsvold Vedum (Sp).
- Compensatory seat - Gunnar Gundersen (H).

===== 2001 =====
Results of the 2001 parliamentary election held on 9 and 10 September 2001:

Party		Votes	%	Seats		
Party		Votes	%	Con.	Com.	Tot.
Labour Party	Ap	40,125	37.61%	3	0	3
Socialist Left Party	SV	14,567	13.65%	1	0	1
Conservative Party	H	13,522	12.68%	1	0	1
Progress Party	FrP	11,814	11.07%	1	0	1
Centre Party	Sp	9,660	9.06%	1	0	1
Christian Democratic Party	KrF	8,259	7.74%	1	0	1
Pensioners' Party	PP	3,550	3.33%	0	0	0
Liberal Party	V	2,255	2.11%	0	0	0
The Political Party	DPP	860	0.81%	0	0	0
Coastal Party	KP	833	0.78%	0	0	0
Red Electoral Alliance	RV	405	0.38%	0	0	0
Christian Unity Party	KSP	182	0.17%	0	0	0
Communist Party of Norway	K	179	0.17%	0	0	0
Green Party	MDG	111	0.10%	0	0	0
Fatherland Party	FLP	108	0.10%	0	0	0
Norwegian People's Party	NFP	105	0.10%	0	0	0
County Lists		93	0.09%	0	0	0
Natural Law Party		53	0.05%	0	0	0
Valid votes		106,681	100.00%	8	0	8
Rejected votes		857	0.80%			
Total polled		107,538	74.07%			
Registered electors		145,193				

The following candidates were elected:

- Constituency seats - Karin Andersen (SV); Per Roar Bredvold (FrP); Sylvia Brustad (Ap); Eirin Faldet (Ap); Ola D. Gløtvold (Sp); Bjørn Hernæs (H); Knut Storberget (Ap); and Åse Wisløff Nilssen (KrF).

==== 1990s ====
===== 1997 =====
Results of the 1997 parliamentary election held on 15 September 1997:

Party		Votes	%	Seats		
Party		Votes	%	Con.	Com.	Tot.
Labour Party	Ap	53,035	47.00%	4	0	4
Centre Party	Sp	14,760	13.08%	1	0	1
Progress Party	FrP	12,467	11.05%	1	0	1
Christian Democratic Party	KrF	9,742	8.63%	1	0	1
Conservative Party	H	8,932	7.92%	1	0	1
Socialist Left Party	SV	8,782	7.78%	0	1	1
Liberal Party	V	2,680	2.37%	0	0	0
Pensioners' Party	PP	1,093	0.97%	0	0	0
Red Electoral Alliance	RV	769	0.68%	0	0	0
Natural Law Party		154	0.14%	0	0	0
Communist Party of Norway	K	148	0.13%	0	0	0
Fatherland Party	FLP	148	0.13%	0	0	0
Green Party	MDG	139	0.12%	0	0	0
Valid votes		112,849	100.00%	8	1	9
Rejected votes		553	0.49%			
Total polled		113,402	77.96%			
Registered electors		145,462				

The following candidates were elected:

- Constituency seats - Per Roar Bredvold (FrP); Sylvia Brustad (Ap); Eirin Faldet (Ap); Grethe G. Fossum (Ap); Ola D. Gløtvold (Sp); Bjørn Hernæs (H); Einar Olav Skogholt (Ap); and Åse Wisløff Nilssen (KrF).
- Compensatory seat - Karin Andersen (SV).

===== 1993 =====
Results of the 1993 parliamentary election held on 12 and 13 September 1993:

Party		Votes	%	Seats		
Party		Votes	%	Con.	Com.	Tot.
Labour Party	Ap	54,542	48.82%	4	0	4
Centre Party	Sp	23,854	21.35%	2	0	2
Socialist Left Party	SV	11,689	10.46%	1	0	1
Conservative Party	H	9,414	8.43%	1	0	1
Progress Party	FrP	4,044	3.62%	0	0	0
Christian Democratic Party	KrF	3,233	2.89%	0	0	0
Liberal Party	V	2,234	2.00%	0	0	0
Pensioners' Party	PP	1,416	1.27%	0	0	0
Red Electoral Alliance	RV	354	0.32%	0	0	0
Fatherland Party	FLP	304	0.27%	0	0	0
New Future Coalition Party	SNF	198	0.18%	0	0	0
Freedom Party against the EU		121	0.11%	0	0	0
Communist Party of Norway	K	115	0.10%	0	0	0
Natural Law Party		112	0.10%	0	0	0
Liberal People's Party	DLF	45	0.04%	0	0	0
Common Future		43	0.04%	0	0	0
Valid votes		111,718	100.00%	8	0	8
Rejected votes		692	0.62%			
Total polled		112,410	76.36%			
Registered electors		147,211				

The following candidates were elected:

- Constituency seats - Sylvia Brustad (Ap); Eirin Faldet (Ap); Ola D. Gløtvold (Sp); Ragnhild Queseth Haarstad (Sp); Bjørn Hernæs (H); Sigbjørn Johnsen (Ap); Einar Olav Skogholt (Ap); and Magnar Sortåsløkken (SV).

==== 1980s ====
===== 1989 =====
Results of the 1989 parliamentary election held on 10 and 11 September 1989:

Party		Votes	%	Seats		
Party		Votes	%	Con.	Com.	Tot.
Labour Party	Ap	63,427	52.19%	5	0	5
Conservative Party	H	14,726	12.12%	1	0	1
Socialist Left Party	SV	14,316	11.78%	1	0	1
Centre Party	Sp	12,324	10.14%	1	0	1
Progress Party	FrP	9,689	7.97%	0	0	0
Christian Democratic Party	KrF	4,152	3.42%	0	0	0
Liberal Party	V	1,893	1.56%	0	0	0
Green Party	MDG	471	0.39%	0	0	0
County Lists for Environment and Solidarity	FMS	453	0.37%	0	0	0
Free Elected Representatives		42	0.03%	0	0	0
Liberals-Europe Party		42	0.03%	0	0	0
Valid votes		121,535	100.00%	8	0	8
Rejected votes		345	0.28%			
Total polled		121,880	83.36%			
Registered electors		146,215				

The following candidates were elected:

- Constituency seats - Kjell Borgen (Ap); Sylvia Brustad (Ap);Eirin Faldet (Ap); Ragnhild Queseth Haarstad (Sp); Sigbjørn Johnsen (Ap); Johan C. Løken (H); Einar Olav Skogholt (Ap); and Magnar Sortåsløkken (SV).

===== 1985 =====
Results of the 1985 parliamentary election held on 8 and 9 September 1985:

Party		Votes	%	Seats
Labour Party	Ap	71,924	58.41%	5
Conservative Party	H	20,658	16.78%	1
Centre Party	Sp	11,851	9.62%	1
Socialist Left Party	SV	10,118	8.22%	1
Christian Democratic Party	KrF	3,842	3.12%	0
Progress Party	FrP	2,062	1.67%	0
Liberal Party	V	1,582	1.28%	0
Communist Party of Norway	K	321	0.26%	0
Liberal People's Party	DLF	266	0.22%	0
Red Electoral Alliance	RV	257	0.21%	0
Pensioners' Party	PP	224	0.18%	0
Free Elected Representatives		30	0.02%	0
Valid votes		123,135	100.00%	8
Rejected votes		152	0.12%	
Total polled		123,287	85.66%	
Registered electors		143,931		

The following candidates were elected: Anne-Lise Bakken (Ap); Kjell Borgen (Ap); Eirin Faldet (Ap); Kjell Magne Fredheim (Ap); Ragnhild Queseth Haarstad (Sp); Sigbjørn Johnsen (Ap); Johan C. Løken (H); and Magnar Sortåsløkken (SV).

===== 1981 =====
Results of the 1981 parliamentary election held on 13 and 14 September 1981:

Party		Votes	%	Seats
Labour Party	Ap	66,930	56.01%	5
Conservative Party	H	20,991	17.57%	2
Centre Party–Christian Democratic Party–Liberal Party	Sp-KrF-V	17,986	15.05%	1
Socialist Left Party	SV	9,302	7.78%	0
Progress Party	FrP	2,718	2.27%	0
Communist Party of Norway	K	618	0.52%	0
Red Electoral Alliance	RV	408	0.34%	0
Liberal People's Party	DLF	336	0.28%	0
Plebiscite Party		120	0.10%	0
Free Elected Representatives		82	0.07%	0
Valid votes		119,491	100.00%	8
Rejected votes		260	0.22%	
Total polled		119,751	84.59%	
Registered electors		141,573		

The following candidates were elected: Anne-Lise Bakken (Ap); Kjell Borgen (Ap); Christian Erlandsen (H); Kjell Magne Fredheim (Ap); Ragnhild Queseth Haarstad (Sp-KrF-V); Sigbjørn Johnsen (Ap); Johan C. Løken (H); and Odvar Nordli (Ap).

==== 1970s ====
===== 1977 =====
Results of the 1977 parliamentary election held on 11 and 12 September 1977:

Party		Votes	%	Seats
Labour Party	Ap	67,684	60.15%	6
Centre Party	Sp	15,069	13.39%	1
Conservative Party	H	12,493	11.10%	1
Socialist Left Party	SV	6,770	6.02%	0
Christian Democratic Party	KrF	6,463	5.74%	0
Liberal Party	V	1,359	1.21%	0
Progress Party	FrP	915	0.81%	0
Communist Party of Norway	K	800	0.71%	0
New People's Party	DNF	518	0.46%	0
Red Electoral Alliance	RV	266	0.24%	0
Free Elected Representatives		83	0.07%	0
Norwegian Democratic Party		58	0.05%	0
Single Person's Party		56	0.05%	0
Valid votes		112,534	100.00%	8
Rejected votes		186	0.17%	
Total polled		112,720	85.75%	
Registered electors		131,459		

The following candidates were elected: Anne-Lise Bakken (Ap); Kjell Borgen (Ap); Christian Erlandsen (H); Kjell Magne Fredheim (Ap); Sigbjørn Johnsen (Ap); Ottar Landfald (Sp); Odvar Nordli (Ap); and Else Repål (Ap).

===== 1973 =====
Results of the 1973 parliamentary election held on 9 and 10 September 1973:

Party		Votes	%	Seats
Labour Party	Ap	55,857	51.99%	4
Centre Party–Christian Democratic Party–Liberal Party	Sp-KrF-V	21,783	20.27%	2
Socialist Electoral League	SV	14,707	13.69%	1
Conservative Party	H	10,872	10.12%	1
Anders Lange's Party	ALP	2,488	2.32%	0
New People's Party	DNF	958	0.89%	0
Red Electoral Alliance	RV	309	0.29%	0
Single Person's Party		184	0.17%	0
Norwegian Democratic Party		148	0.14%	0
Women's Free Elected Representatives		135	0.13%	0
Valid votes		107,441	100.00%	8
Rejected votes		164	0.15%	
Total polled		107,605	84.80%	
Registered electors		126,886		

The following candidates were elected: Kjell Magne Fredheim (Ap); Lars Holen (Ap); Ottar Landfald (Sp-KrF-V); Reidar T. Larsen (SV); Odvar Nordli (Ap); Johan Østby (Sp-KrF-V); Lars T. Platou (H); and Else Repål (Ap).

==== 1960s ====
===== 1969 =====
Results of the 1969 parliamentary election held on 7 and 8 September 1969:

Party		Votes	%	Seats
Labour Party	Ap	66,691	61.31%	5
Centre Party	Sp	19,298	17.74%	2
Conservative Party	H	11,188	10.28%	1
Socialist People's Party	SF	3,741	3.44%	0
Communist Party of Norway	K	2,943	2.71%	0
Liberal Party	V	2,613	2.40%	0
Christian Democratic Party	KrF	2,307	2.12%	0
Valid votes		108,781	100.00%	8
Rejected votes		198	0.18%	
Total polled		108,979	88.50%	
Registered electors		123,137		

The following candidates were elected: Kjell Magne Fredheim (Ap); Lars Holen (Ap); Harald Johan Løbak (Ap); Odvar Nordli (Ap); Johan Østby (Sp); Lars T. Platou (H); Else Repål (Ap); and Karstein Seland (Sp).

===== 1965 =====
Results of the 1965 parliamentary election held on 12 and 13 September 1965:

Party		Votes	%	Seats
Labour Party	Ap	59,484	57.07%	5
Centre Party	Sp	20,173	19.36%	2
Conservative Party	H	10,853	10.41%	1
Communist Party of Norway	K	5,703	5.47%	0
Socialist People's Party	SF	5,344	5.13%	0
Liberal Party	V	2,666	2.56%	0
Wild Votes		1	0.00%	0
Valid votes		104,224	100.00%	8
Rejected votes		434	0.41%	
Total polled		104,658	89.29%	
Registered electors		117,213		

The following candidates were elected: Otto Dahl (Ap); Lars Holen (Ap); Harald Johan Løbak (Ap); Odvar Nordli (Ap); Johan Østby (Sp); Lars T. Platou (H); Karstein Seland (Sp); and Haldis Tjernsberg (Ap).

===== 1961 =====
Results of the 1961 parliamentary election held on 11 September 1961:

Party		Votes	%	Seats
Labour Party	Ap	57,498	60.00%	5
Centre Party	Sp	17,318	18.07%	2
Conservative Party	H	9,691	10.11%	1
Communist Party of Norway	K	8,067	8.42%	0
Liberal Party	V	3,244	3.39%	0
Wild Votes		12	0.01%	0
Valid votes		95,830	100.00%	8
Rejected votes		597	0.62%	
Total polled		96,427	82.74%	
Registered electors		116,545		

The following candidates were elected: Reidar Magnus Aamo (Ap), 57,495 votes; Otto Dahl (Ap), 57,479 votes; Karen Grønn-Hagen (Sp), 17,317 votes; Alv Kjøs (H), 9,691 votes; Harald Johan Løbak (Ap), 57,489 votes; Odvar Nordli (Ap), 57,480 votes; Ole Rømer Aagaard Sandberg (Sp), 17,314 votes; and Haldis Tjernsberg (Ap), 57,490 votes.

==== 1950s ====
===== 1957 =====
Results of the 1957 parliamentary election held on 7 October 1957:

Party		Votes	%	Seats
Labour Party	Ap	56,004	59.51%	5
Farmers' Party	Bp	15,023	15.96%	1
Conservative Party	H	9,213	9.79%	1
Communist Party of Norway	K	7,674	8.15%	1
Christian Democratic Party	KrF	3,604	3.83%	0
Liberal Party	V	2,212	2.35%	0
Norwegian Social Democratic Party		373	0.40%	0
Valid votes		94,103	100.00%	8
Rejected votes		494	0.52%	
Total polled		94,597	80.88%	
Registered electors		116,965		

The following candidates were elected: Reidar Magnus Aamo (Ap); Otto Dahl (Ap); Kristian Fjeld (Ap); Alv Kjøs (H); Oskar Lindberget (Ap); Harald Johan Løbak (Ap); Emil Løvlien (K); and Ole Rømer Aagaard Sandberg (Bp).

===== 1953 =====
Results of the 1953 parliamentary election held on 12 October 1953:

Party		Votes	%	Seats
Labour Party	Ap	57,065	59.56%	5
Farmers' Party	Bp	15,084	15.74%	1
Conservative Party	H	10,365	10.82%	1
Communist Party of Norway	K	9,977	10.41%	1
Liberal Party	V	3,311	3.46%	0
Wild Votes		4	0.00%	0
Valid votes		95,806	100.00%	8
Rejected votes		535	0.56%	
Total polled		96,341	82.49%	
Registered electors		116,797		

The following candidates were elected: Reidar Magnus Aamo (Ap); Otto Dahl (Ap); Kristian Fjeld (Ap); Einar Frogner (Bp); Alv Kjøs (H); Oskar Lindberget (Ap); Harald Johan Løbak (Ap); and Emil Løvlien (K).

==== 1940s ====
===== 1949 =====
Results of the 1949 parliamentary election held on 10 October 1949:

Party		Votes	%	Seats
Labour Party	Ap	50,638	59.15%	5
Farmers' Party–Conservative Party–Liberal Party	Bp-H-V	24,417	28.52%	2
Communist Party of Norway	K	10,089	11.78%	0
Society Party	Samfp	464	0.54%	0
Wild Votes		2	0.00%	0
Valid votes		85,610	100.00%	7
Rejected votes		634	0.74%	
Total polled		86,244	84.36%	
Registered electors		102,228		

The following candidates were elected: Reidar Magnus Aamo (Ap); Kristian Fjeld (Ap); Einar Frogner (Bp-H-V); Alv Kjøs (Bp-H-V); Oskar Lindberget (Ap); Harald Johan Løbak (Ap); and Johanne Samueline Pedersen (Ap).

===== 1945 =====
Results of the 1945 parliamentary election held on 8 October 1945:

Party		Party			List Alliance		
Party		Votes	%	Seats	Votes	%	Seats
Labour Party	Ap	41,608	53.79%	5	41,608	53.79%	4
Farmers' Party	Bp	10,137	13.10%	1	16,800	21.72%	2
Conservative Party	H	6,663	8.61%	0	16,800	21.72%	2
Communist Party of Norway	K	15,057	19.46%	1	15,057	19.46%	1
Liberal Party	V	3,891	5.03%	0	3,891	5.03%	0
Wild Votes		1	0.00%	0	1	0.00%	0
Valid votes		77,357	100.00%	7	77,357	100.00%	7
Rejected votes		604	0.77%				
Total polled		77,961	80.76%				
Registered electors		96,530					

As the list alliance was entitled to more seats contesting as an alliance than it was contesting as individual parties, the distribution of seats was as list alliance votes. The Bp-H list alliance's additional seat was allocated to the Conservative Party.

The following candidates were elected: Kristian Fjeld (Ap); Einar Frogner (Bp); Arvid Johansen (Ap); Alv Kjøs (H); Harald Johan Løbak (Ap); Emil Løvlien (K); and Johanne Samueline Pedersen (Ap).

==== 1930s ====
===== 1936 =====
Results of the 1936 parliamentary election held on 19 October 1936:

Party		Party			List Alliance		
Party		Votes	%	Seats	Votes	%	Seats
Labour Party	Ap	43,494	61.07%	6	43,494	61.09%	5
Farmers' Party	Bp	13,129	18.43%	1	24,756	34.77%	2
Conservative Party	H	7,011	9.84%	0	24,756	34.77%	2
Liberal Party	V	4,637	6.51%	0	24,756	34.77%	2
Nasjonal Samling	NS	2,086	2.93%	0	2,086	2.93%	0
Society Party	Samfp	864	1.21%	0	864	1.21%	0
Wild Votes		1	0.00%	0	1	0.00%	0
Valid votes		71,222	100.00%	7	71,201	100.00%	7
Rejected votes		-678	-0.96%				
Total polled		70,544	84.19%				
Registered electors		83,790					

As the list alliance was entitled to more seats contesting as an alliance than it was contesting as individual parties, the distribution of seats was as list alliance votes. The Bp-H-V list alliance's additional seat was allocated to the Conservative Party.

The following candidates were elected: Karsten Fonstad (Ap); Alv Kjøs (H); Oscar Nilssen (Ap); Olav Østby-Deglum (Bp); Olav Østby-Deglum (Ap); Knut Sjøli (Ap); and Peder E. Vorum (Ap).

===== 1933 =====
Results of the 1933 parliamentary election held on 16 October 1933:

Party		Votes	%	Seats
Labour Party	Ap	34,330	53.80%	5
Farmers' Party	Bp	13,666	21.42%	2
Conservative Party	H	5,889	9.23%	0
Liberal Party–Radical People's Party	V-RF	5,849	9.17%	0
Communist Party of Norway	K	2,583	4.05%	0
Nasjonal Samling	NS	1,495	2.34%	0
Valid votes		63,812	100.00%	7
Rejected votes		250	0.39%	
Total polled		64,062	79.80%	
Registered electors		80,278		

The following candidates were elected: Lars Olsen Aukrust (Bp); Karsten Fonstad (Ap); Oscar Nilssen (Ap); Olav Østby-Deglum (Bp); Olav Østby-Deglum (Ap); Knut Sjøli (Ap); and Peder E. Vorum (Ap).

===== 1930 =====
Results of the 1930 parliamentary election held on 20 October 1930:

Party		Votes	%	Seats
Labour Party	Ap	27,876	45.36%	4
Farmers' Party	Bp	16,082	26.17%	2
Conservative Party–Free-minded Liberal Party	H-FV	8,288	13.49%	1
Liberal Party–Radical People's Party	V-RF	6,495	10.57%	0
Communist Party of Norway	K	2,711	4.41%	0
Valid votes		61,452	100.00%	7
Rejected votes		209	0.34%	
Total polled		61,661	80.05%	
Registered electors		77,028		

The following candidates were elected: Peter Thorvald Gaustad (H-FV); Kristian Lian (Ap); Arne Løfsgaard (Bp); Oscar Nilssen (Ap); Olav Østby-Deglum (Bp); Olav Jørgen Sæter (Ap); and Knut Sjøli (Ap).

==== 1920s ====
===== 1927 =====
Results of the 1927 parliamentary election held on 17 October 1927:

Party		Votes	%	Seats
Labour Party	Ap	22,149	40.94%	3
Farmers' Party	Bp	12,889	23.82%	2
Communist Party of Norway	K	7,096	13.12%	1
Conservative Party–Free-minded Liberal Party	H-FV	6,870	12.70%	1
Liberal Party	V	4,231	7.82%	0
Radical People's Party	RF	867	1.60%	0
Valid votes		54,102	100.00%	7
Rejected votes		537	0.98%	
Total polled		54,639	72.87%	
Registered electors		74,985		

The following candidates were elected: Ole Ludvig Bærøe (H-FV); Arne Løfsgaard (Bp); Johan E. Mellbye (Bp); Oscar Nilssen (Ap); Olav Jørgen Sæter (Ap); Olav Scheflo (K); and Knut Sjøli (Ap).

===== 1924 =====
Results of the 1924 parliamentary election held on 21 October 1924:

Party		Votes	%	Seats
Farmers' Party	Bp	11,921	23.00%	2
Labour Party	Ap	11,638	22.46%	2
Conservative Party–Free-minded Liberal Party	H-FV	11,568	22.32%	2
Communist Party of Norway	K	10,007	19.31%	1
Liberal Party–Radical People's Party	V-RF	5,540	10.69%	0
Social Democratic Labour Party of Norway	S	1,154	2.23%	0
Valid votes		51,828	100.00%	7
Rejected votes		696	1.33%	
Total polled		52,524	72.94%	
Registered electors		72,008		

The following candidates were elected: Kristen Andersen Aalborg (B); Johan E. Mellbye (Bp); Oscar Nilssen (Ap); Eivind Petershagen (K); Olav Jørgen Sæter (Ap); Kristoffer Skraastad (H-FV); and Otto Halvorsen Svenkerud (H-FV).

===== 1921 =====
Results of the 1921 parliamentary election held on 24 October 1921:

Party		Votes	%	Seats
Labour Party	Ap	17,799	36.81%	3
Conservative Party–Free-minded Liberal Party	H-FV	13,124	27.14%	2
Norwegian Farmers' Association	L	7,955	16.45%	1
Liberal Party	V	4,675	9.67%	1
Radical People's Party	RF	2,879	5.95%	0
Social Democratic Labour Party of Norway	S	1,920	3.97%	0
Wild Votes		8	0.02%	0
Valid votes		48,360	100.00%	7
Rejected votes		654	1.33%	
Total polled		49,014	70.88%	
Registered electors		69,151		

The following candidates were elected: Thorbjørn Gjølstad (H-FV); Johannes Johnsen Grue (V); Wollert Konow (H-FV); Johan E. Mellbye (L); Oscar Nilssen (Ap); Olav Jørgen Sæter (Ap); and Knut Sjøli (Ap).
