= Fredheim =

Fredheim is a surname. Notable people with the surname include:

- Daniel Fredheim Holm (born 1985), Norwegian footballer and coach
- Kjell Magne Fredheim (1928–2006), Norwegian politician
- Kris Fredheim (born 1987), Canadian ice hockey player
- Tor-Arne Fredheim (born 1962), Swedish football player and manager
