= Karen Grønn-Hagen =

Norwegian politician

Minister of Family and Consumer Affairs
- In office 28 August 1963 – 25 September 1963
- Prime Minister: John Lyng
- Preceded by: Aase Bjerkholt
- Succeeded by: Aase Bjerkholt

Member of the Norwegian Parliament
- In office 1 October 1961 – 30 September 1965
- Constituency: Hedmark

Deputy Member of the Norwegian Parliament
- In office 1 January 1954 – 31 December 1957 (Note: Replaced Einar Frogner as permanent representative after his death on 10 July 1955.)
- Constituency: Hedmark

Personal details
- Born: 27 November 1903 Tynset Municipality, Norway
- Died: 19 December 1982 (aged 79)
- Party: Centre
- Children: Per N. Hagen

Karen Grønn-Hagen (27 November 1903 – 19 December 1982) was a Norwegian politician for the Centre Party.

She was born in Tynset Municipality.

She was elected to the Norwegian Parliament from Hedmark in 1961. From August to September 1963 she served as the Minister of Family and Consumer Affairs during the short-lived centre-right cabinet Lyng. During her stint as cabinet member her place in the Parliament was taken by Karstein Seland. Grønn-Hagen had previously served in the position of deputy representative during the term 1954–1957, but a year into this term she replaced the deceased Einar Frogner as a regular representative.

Grønn-Hagen was a member of the municipal council for Tynset Municipality from 1951 to 1959, and became deputy mayor in 1959–1960.

== Notes ==
Political offices
Preceded by Aase Bjerkholt	Minister of Family and Consumer Affairs (Norway); August 1963–September 1963	Succeeded by Aase Bjerkholt
