= Reidar Magnus Aamo =

Norwegian politician (1898–1972)

Reidar Magnus Aamo (5 August 1898 – 29 March 1972) was a Norwegian politician for the Labour Party.

He was born in what is now Os Municipality (at that time it was part of Tolga Municipality in Hedmark county).

He was elected to the Norwegian Parliament from Hedmark in 1950, and was re-elected on three occasions. He had previously served as a deputy representative in the period 1945–1949, during which he served as a regular representative meanwhile Kristian Fjeld was appointed to Gerhardsen's Second Cabinet.

On the local level, Aamo was also involved in local politics in Tolga Municipality and Os Municipality, both before and after the Second World War.

Outside of politics, he was a farmer and miner before becoming editor-in-chief of Arbeidets Rett from 1932 to 1941. At that point, he returned to farming.
