= Tone Sønsterud =

Norwegian trade union leader and politician

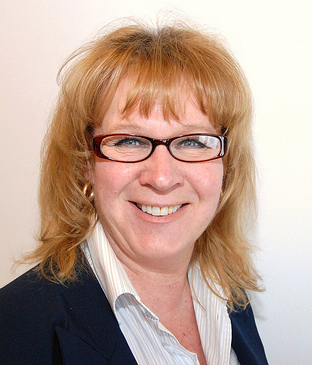
Tone Sønsterud

Tone Merete Sønsterud (born 17 May 1959) is a Norwegian trade union leader and politician who represents the Arbeiderpartiet. She is deputy leader of LO Stat, and the Arbeiderpartiet's fourth candidate from Hedmark at the 2009 Norwegian parliamentary election, and he lives in Kongsvinger. She was deputy representative for the Stortinget 2001-05 and from 2005 to 2009 and has attended for longer.

Sønsterud has a working background in Statistics Norway on Kongsvinger since 1977. She has worked with Norwegian Civil Service Union, and sits on the Norwegian Confederation of Trade Unions representative board. Tone Sønsterud was elected to the municipal council for Kongsvinger Municipality from 1984–88, and to the Hedmark county council from 1988–1991.
