= 1953 Norwegian parliamentary election =

- 12 October 1953

All 150 seats in the Storting 76 seats needed for a majority
- Turnout: 79.33%
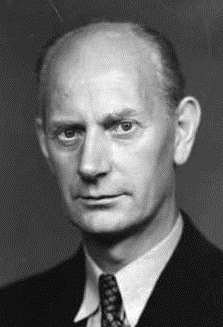

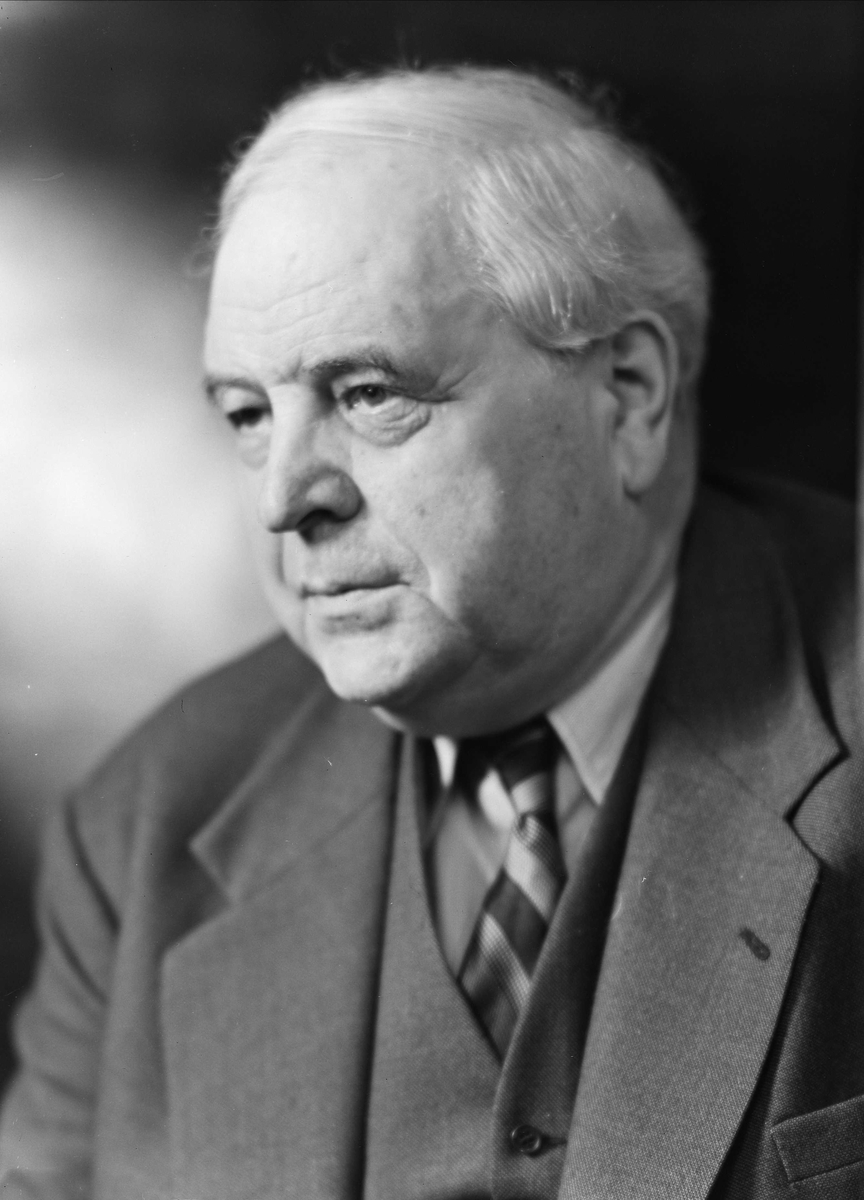

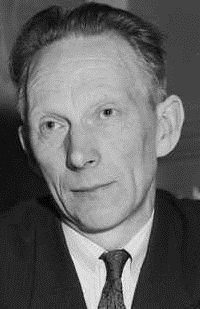

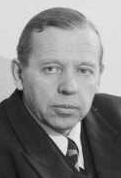

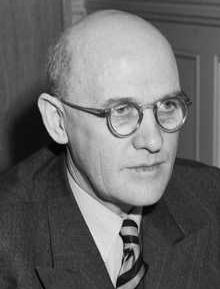

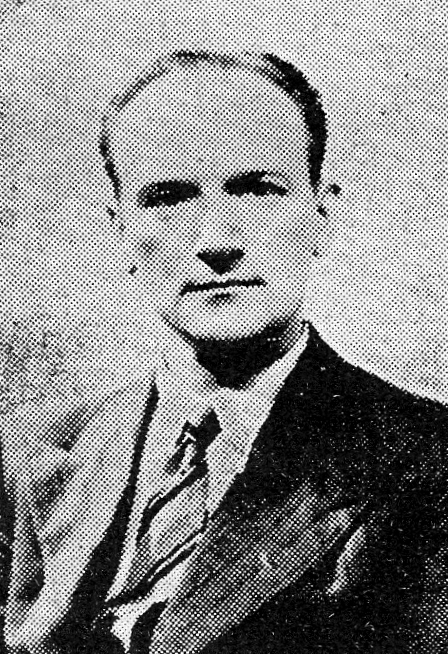
	First party	Second party	Third party
Leader	Einar Gerhardsen	C. J. Hambro	Bent Røiseland
Party	Labour	Conservative	Liberal
Last election	45.7%, 85 seats	20.5%, 23 seats	16.5%, 21 seats
Seats won	77	27	15
Seat change	▼8	▲4	▼6
Popular vote	830,448	337,632^{[a]}	177,662
Percentage	46.7%	18.9%^{[a]}	10.0%
	Fourth party	Fifth party	Sixth party
Leader	Erling Wikborg	Einar Frogner	Emil Løvlien
Party	Christian Democratic	Farmers'	Communist
Last election	8.1%, 9 seats	10.8%, 12 seats	5.8%, 0 seats
Seats won	14	14	3
Seat change	▲5	▲2	▲3
Popular vote	186,627	166,679^{[a]}	90,422
Percentage	10.5%	9.3%^{[a]}	5.1%
- Largest bloc and seats won by constituency
Prime Minister before election
Oscar Torp
Labour
Prime Minister after election
Oscar Torp
Labour

Parliamentary elections were held in Norway on 12 October 1953. The result was a victory for the Labour Party, which won 77 of the 150 seats in the Storting.

== Contesting parties ==
Name		Ideology	Position	Leader	1949 result	
Name		Ideology	Position	Leader	Votes (%)	Seats
Ap	Labour Party; Arbeiderpartiet	Social democracy	Centre-left	Einar Gerhardsen	45.7%	85 / 150
H	Conservative Party; Høyre	Conservatism	Centre-right	C. J. Hambro	20.5%	23 / 150
V	Liberal Party; Venstre	Social liberalism	Centre	Bent Røiseland	16.5%	21 / 150
Bp	Farmer's Party; Bondepartiet	Agrarianism	Centre	Einar Frogner	10.8%	12 / 150
KrF	Christian Democratic Party; Kristelig Folkeparti	Christian democracy	Centre to centre-right	Erling Wikborg	8.1%	9 / 150
NKP	Communist Party of Norway; Norges Kommunistiske Parti	Communism	Far-left	Emil Løvlien	5.8%	0 / 150

== Endorsements ==
=== National daily newspapers ===
Newspaper	Party endorsed
Tønsbergs Blad	Conservative Party

== Results ==
Party	Votes	%	Seats	+/–
Labour Party	830,448	46.66	77	–8
Conservative Party	327,971	18.43	26	+4
Christian Democratic Party	186,627	10.49	14	+5
Liberal Party	177,662	9.98	15	–6
Farmers' Party	157,018	8.82	14	+2
Communist Party	90,422	5.08	3	+3
Farmers–Conservatives (Note: The joint list of the Farmers' Party and Conservative Party won one seat, which was taken by the Conservative Party.)	9,661	0.54	1	–
Wild votes	22	0.00	–	–
Total	1,779,831	100.00	150	0
Valid votes	1,779,831	99.41		
Invalid/blank votes	10,500	0.59		
Total votes	1,790,331	100.00		
Registered voters/turnout	2,256,799	79.33		
Source: Nohlen & Stöver

=== Seat distribution ===
Constituency	Total seats	Seats won					
Constituency	Total seats	Ap	H	V	KrF	B	K
Akershus	7	4	2			1	
Aust-Agder	4	2	1		1		
Bergen	5	3	1	1			
Buskerud	7	4	2			1	
Finnmark	4	2	1				1
Hedmark	8	5	1			1	1
Hordaland	10	4	1	2	2	1	
Møre og Romsdal	10	4	1	2	2	1	
Nord-Trøndelag	6	3		1		2	
Nordland	12	7	2	1	1	1	
Oppland	7	5				2	
Oslo	13	5	5	1	1		1
Østfold	8	5	1		1	1	
Rogaland	10	3	2	2	2	1	
Sogn og Fjordane	5	2		1	1	1	
Sør-Trøndelag	10	5	2	1	1	1	
Telemark	6	4		1	1		
Troms	6	4	1	1			
Vest-Agder	5	2	1	1	1		
Vestfold	7	4	3				
Total	150	77	27	15	14	14	3
Source: Norges Offisielle Statistikk
