= Morten Kolbjørnsen =

Norwegian politician (born 1958)

Member of the Storting
- Incumbent
- Assumed office 2025
- Constituency: Hedmark

Personal details
- Born: 17 September 1958 (age 67)
- Party: Progress Party

Morten Kolbjørnsen (born 17 September 1958) is a Norwegian politician from the Progress Party (FrP). He was elected to the Storting in the 2025 Norwegian parliamentary election. He is the oldest member of the Storting. Kolbjørnsen served in the Norwegian Army in the War in Afghanistan.
