= Arvid Johansen =

Norwegian politician

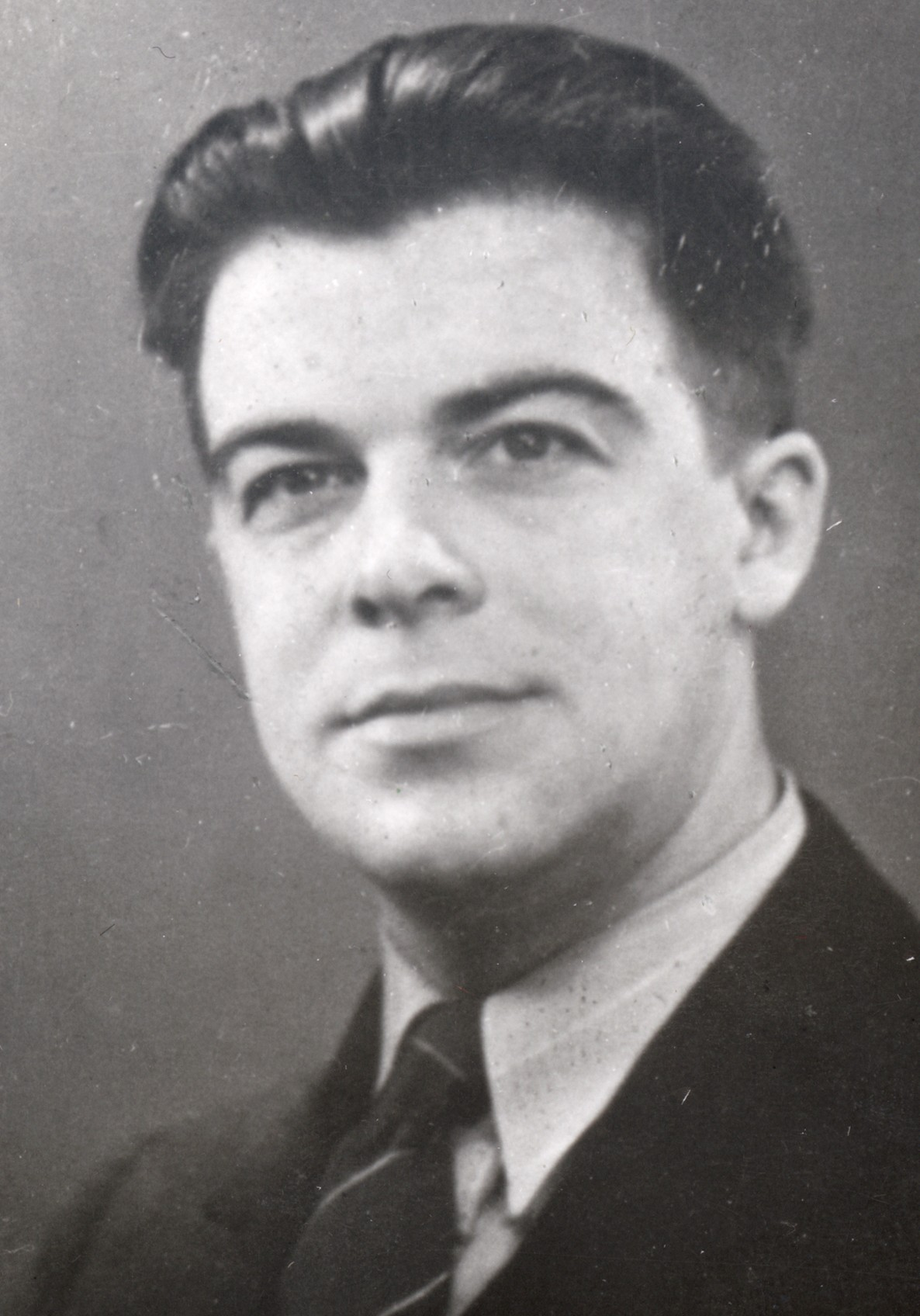
Arvid Johansen

Arvid Johansen (12 November 1910 – 1 May 1996) was a Norwegian politician for the Labour Party.

He was born in Sør-Odal Municipality. He was elected to the Norwegian Parliament from Hedmark in 1945, but was not re-elected in 1949.

Johansen was a member of the executive committee of the municipal council for Sør-Odal Municipality from 1937 to 1945, and later served as deputy mayor during the terms 1959–1963 and 1963–1967.
