= Norwegian Union of Forestry and Agriculture Workers =

Norwegian trade union

The Norwegian Union of Forestry and Agricultural Workers (Norwegian: Norsk Skog- og Jordbruksarbeiderforbund) was a trade union in Norway.

It was founded in 1912, but broke down in 1924. Well-known leading figures include Oscar Nilssen, deputy chairman from 1917 to 1921.

It was succeeded by the Norwegian Union of Forestry and Land Workers in 1927.
