= Einar Olav Skogholt =

Norwegian politician (1947–2025)

Einar Olav Skogholt (18 December 1947 – 10 January 2025) was a Norwegian politician for the Labour Party.

== Life and career ==
Skogholt was born in Nord-Odal Municipality on 18 December 1947. He was elected to the Norwegian Parliament from Hedmark in 1989, and was re-elected on two occasions. He had previously served as deputy representative during the terms 1977–1981 and 1985–1989.

He was mayor of Nord-Odal Municipality in 1972–1975 and 1975–1977, and a member of Hedmark county council in 1988–1989. He chaired the county party chapter from 1990 to 1998.

Skogholt died on 10 January 2025, at the age of 77.
