= Aage Søgaard =

Norwegian politician

Aage William Søgaard (29 December 1933 – 4 May 2010) was a Norwegian trade unionist and politician for the Labour Party.

== Career ==
He was born in Nes Municipality as a son of Martin Søgård (1898–1969) and dressmaker Ellen Myhre (1907–1963). He had modest education, and worked as a repair man at the factory Hedmark Tørrmelk in Brumunddal from 1955 to 1966. In his local branch (#98) of the union Norwegian Union of Food, Beverage and Allied Workers, he was the treasurer from 1957 to 1964 and chairman from 1964 to 1967. From 1966 to 1982 he worked full-time as secretary of the Norwegian Confederation of Trade Unions in Hedmark county. He then worked in high positions in Arbeidernes Opplysningsforbund from 1982 to 1999.

He was a member of the municipal council of Ringsaker Municipality from 1963 to 1967. He served as a deputy representative to the Parliament of Norway from Hedmark during the term 1969–1973. From 1971 to 1972 he met as a regular representative, filling the seat of Odvar Nordli who was a member of Bratteli's First Cabinet. Søgaard was a member and secretary of the Protocol Committee.

He was a member of the municipal school board from 1967 to 1971 and the county school board from 1973 to 1977. He was a member of the regional board of the Norwegian Labour Inspection Authority from 1981 to 1983, and in Norwegian People's Aid he was a member of the regional board from 1967 to 1981 (chairman since 1971), and deputy chairman nationwide from 1979 to 1983. He was a supervisory council member of the Norwegian Confederation of Trade Unions from 1967 to 1981, and a board member of the folk high school Arbeiderbevegelsens Folkehøgskole from 1967 to 1997. In sports he was the chairman of Brumunddal IL's speed skating section from 1971 to 1975 and of the curling club Brumunddal CK from 1978 to 1981.
