= Oskar Lindberget =

Norwegian politician

Paul Oskar Lindberget (6 August 1895 – 10 February 1983) was a Norwegian politician for the Labour Party.

== Biography ==
He was born in Hof Municipality in Hedmark county.

He was elected to the Norwegian Parliament from Hedmark in 1950, and was re-elected on two occasions. He had previously served in the position of deputy representative during the term 1945–1949.

Lindberget was a member of the municipal council for Våler Municipality from 1934 to 1941, and served as deputy mayor in the period 1945–1947.
