= Ola D. Gløtvold =

Norwegian politician

Ola D. Gløtvold (born 1 June 1949 in Engerdal Municipality) is a Norwegian politician for the Centre Party.

He was elected to the Norwegian Parliament from Hedmark in 1993, and was re-elected on two occasions. He had previously served in the position of deputy representative during the term 1973–1977.

Gløtvold was elected to the municipal council of Engerdal Municipality from 1971 to 1991, serving as mayor in 1987–1991. From 1975 to 1993 he was also involved in Hedmark county council.
