= Jon Olav Alstad =

Norwegian politician (born 1968)

Member of the Norwegian Parliament for Nord-Trøndelag
- In office 1993–2001

Personal details
- Born: August 9, 1968 (age 58) Stjørdal Municipality, Norway
- Party: Labour Party
- Education: BI Norwegian Business School; Nord-Trøndelag University College
- Occupation: Farmer and advisor

Jon Olav Alstad (born 9 August 1968) is a Norwegian politician for the Labour Party.

Alstad was born in Stjørdal Municipality, a son of farmer Jon Alstad and nurse Astrid Ingebjørg Folstadli. He graduated from Stjørdal Upper Secondary School in 1987, and worked as a hired farmer from 1986 to 1989. He was elected to the municipal council for Stjørdal Municipality in 1987 and again in 1991. From 1987 to 1989, he chaired the local chapter of the Workers' Youth League (AUF) from 1987 to 1989. He also worked as a machine operator at Dyno Norplast from 1987 to 1989. He attended the BI Norwegian Business School from 1989 to 1991. From 1991 to 1993, he sat on the national board of AUF. In 1993, he was elected county leader for Nord-Trøndelag Youth Against Norwegian Membership in the European Union.

In 1993, Alstad was elected to the Norwegian Parliament, at an age of 25. He was re-elected again in 1997, but failed to win a regular seat in the 2001 election. However, he was the first deputy representative during this period. While in parliament, he sat in the Standing Committee for Family Affairs, Cultural Affairs and Administration.

He became a farmer again in 1995. After losing his regular seat in parliament, he studied business administration at Nord-Trøndelag University College from 2002 to 2004. From 2003 to 2007, he sat on the Nord-Trøndelag County Board for Agriculture. Since 2004, he has worked at Tankesmia, where he has also sat on the board since 2007. Since 2005, he has sat on the Norwegian Broadcasting Corporation's council. In 2007, he returned as an elected member of the municipal council for Stjørdal Municipality.
