= Åse Wisløff Nilssen =

Norwegian politician

Åse Wisløff Nilssen (born 20 July 1945 in Kongsvinger) is a Norwegian politician for the Christian Democratic Party.

She was elected to the Norwegian Parliament from Hedmark in 1997, and was re-elected on one occasion.

Wisløff Nilssen was a member of the executive committee of the municipal council for Kongsvinger Municipality from 1991 to 1995, and of Hedmark county council during the terms 1987–1991 and 1995–1997.
