= Tor André Johnsen =

Norwegian politician (born 1968)

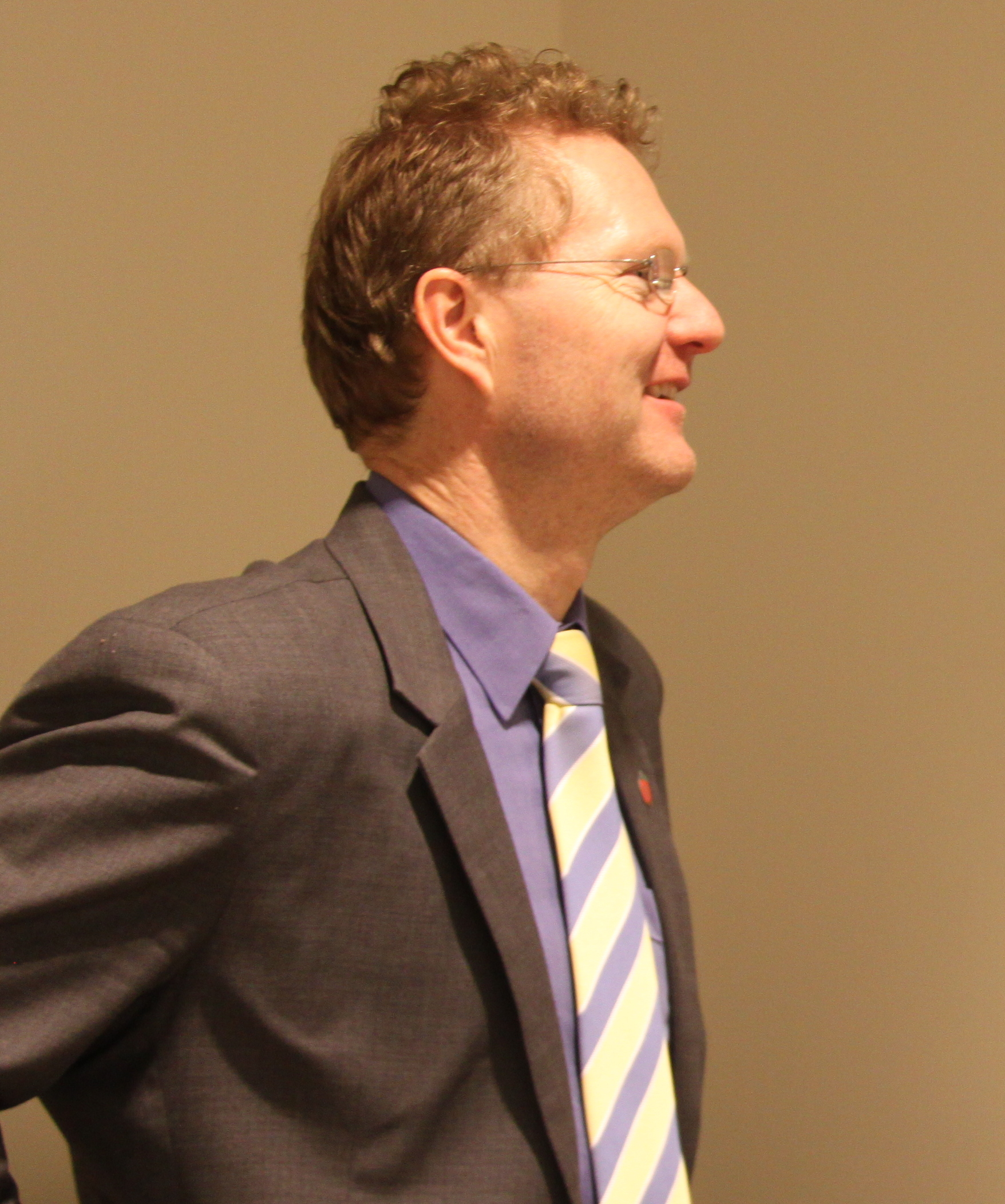
- Johnsen in 2014

Member of the Storting
- Incumbent
- Assumed office 1 October 2013
- Constituency: Hedmark

Personal details
- Born: 25 November 1968 (age 57)
- Party: Progress
- Occupation: Politician

Tor André Johnsen (born 25 November 1968) is a Norwegian politician for the Progress Party (FrP). He has been a member of the Storting since 2013.

== Biography ==
Johnsen was born on 25 November 1968. He hails from Ringsaker, and was elected member of the county council of Hedmark from 1999 to 2015.

He was elected to the Parliament of Norway from Hedmark in 2013 where he is member of the Standing Committee on Labour and Social Affairs. Johnsen has sat on the municipal council in Ringsaker Municipality, Hamar Municipality, and Stange Municipality.

Johnsen considers himself bothered by electromagnetic hypersensitivity.

In 2015, Johnsen was recommended by the Police Security Service to cut off contact with Russian diplomats whom PST considered to be Russian intelligence agents. Johnsen stated that he did not intend to follow the call from PST.

After the parliamentary elections in 2017, Johnsen was reprimanded by the then Prime Minister Erna Solberg for sharing an article from the anti-immigration website 24avisen.com, where a 17-year-old dark-skinned AUF member was incited.
