= Oscar Nilssen =

Norwegian politician (1881–1959)

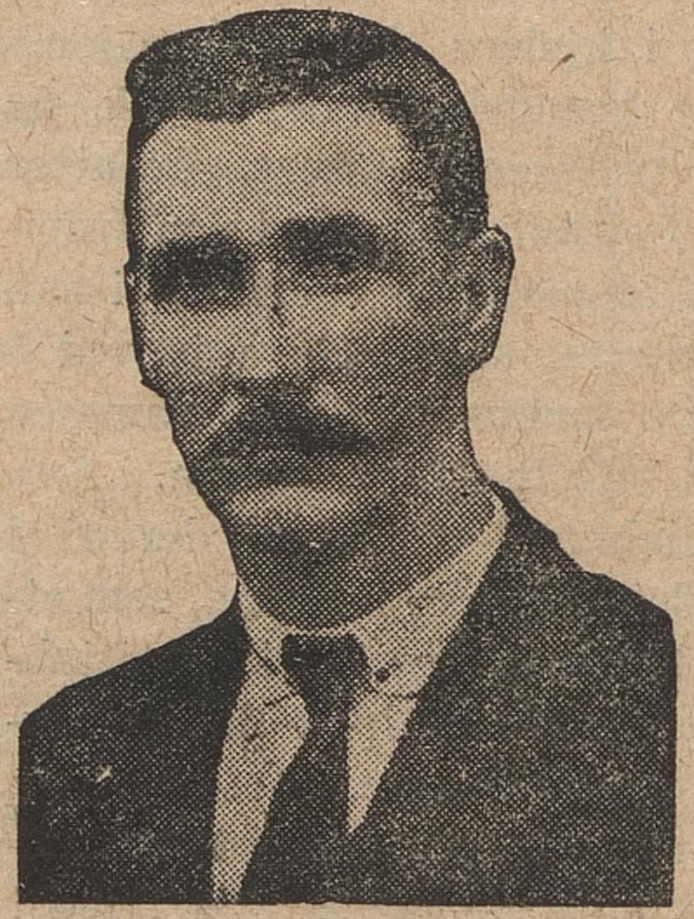
Nilssen ca. 1927

Oscar Wilhelm Nilssen (12 August 1881 – 1959) was a Norwegian politician for the Labour Party.

He was born in Hollandstorp in Sweden as a son of a forest labourer. His father later emigrated to the United States, but Nilssen went to Norway. He worked as a forest labourer from 1896, and settled as a smallholder at Ågård in Løiten Municipality from 1911. He received Norwegian citizenship in the same year.

In 1914 he was elected chairman of a new local group in the Labour Party, Løiten vestre socialdemokratiske forening. He chaired the local cooperative from 1918 to 1923, and was a supervisory council of Norges Kooperative Landsforening. From 1917 to 1921 he was vice chairman and treasurer of the Norwegian Union of Forestry and Agriculture Workers. He chaired the constituency party chapter in Søndre Hedemarkens for some years, and then chaired the county chapter from 1921. In 1951 he had a thirty-year anniversary in this position. He ultimately retired in 1954. One short hiatus came as the Communist Party was founded in 1923, and the county board decided to follow the Communists. Nilssen stayed with Labour, and was excluded as county leader by the majority county board on 13 November 1923. Nilssen got his leadership back when a new county board for the Labour Party was set up on 1 December.

He was elected to the Parliament of Norway in 1921, representing the constituency of Hedmark. He was re-elected in 1924, 1927, 1930, 1933 and 1936. Locally he served as an executive committee member in the municipal council of Løten Municipality from 1916 to 1928, and later served as mayor from 1931 to 1940.

During the German occupation of Norway Nilssen lost his positions as mayor and parliamentarian. He was even arrested on 10 March 1945, incarcerated in Hamar prison to 21 March and then in Grini concentration camp until the end of the Second World War. He became mayor again after the war, and by holding this position, he was also a member of the county council. He died in 1959.
