= Anna Molberg =

Norwegian politician (born 1990)

Member of the Storting
- Incumbent
- Assumed office 1 October 2021
- Constituency: Hedmark

Deputy Member of the Storting
- In office 1 October 2009 – 30 September 2013
- Constituency: Hedmark

Personal details
- Born: 5 August 1990 (age 36) Hamar
- Party: Conservative
- Education: University of Oslo
- Occupation: Politician

Anna Irene Molberg (born 5 August 1990) is a Norwegian politician for the Conservative Party. She has been a member of the Storting since 2021.

== Career ==
Born on 5 August 1990, Molberg hails from Hamar, and graduated in jurisprudence from the University of Oslo.

She was elected representative to the Storting from the constituency of Hedmark for the period 2021–2025, for the Conservative Party. She was reelected representative to the Storting from Hedmark for the period 2025–2029.

She was deputy representative to the Storting from 2009 to 2013.
