= Knut Sjøli =

Norwegian politician

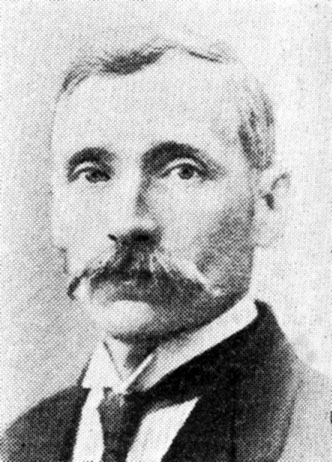
Portrait of Knut Torstensen Sjøli

Knut Torstensen Sjøli (20 February 1877 – 14 February 1955) was a Norwegian politician for the Labour Party.

He was born at Sand i Odal as a son of farmer and cooper Torsten Knudsen Sjøli (1847–1921) and Inge Jørgensdatter (1851–1927). He spent his career as a smallholder in Nord-Odal Municipality and a construction worker in Eastern Norway. In Nord-Odal he chaired the school board and was a member of the health council, congregational council, debt committee and several other boards. He was a member of the county tax board, and a deputy member of the Riksskattestyret.

He was a member of the municipal council for Nord-Odal Municipality for about thirty years, and served as deputy mayor. He was a six-term representative to the Parliament of Norway. First, he was elected from the single-member constituency Vinger og Odalen in 1915 and 1918. After the institution of plural-member constituencies, he was re-elected in 1921 to represent Hedmark. The Labour Party then split with the majority of party members and voters in Hedmark aligning with the Communist Party; thus after the 1924 parliamentary election Sjøli only became a deputy MP. In 1927 however, the bulk of the Hedmark Communist Party re-aligned with Labour, and Sjøli won re-elections in the 1930 parliamentary election, 1933 parliamentary election and 1936 parliamentary elections.
