= Magnar Sortåsløkken =

Norwegian politician (born 1947)

Magnar Sortåsløkken (born 1 August 1947 in Ringsaker) is a Norwegian politician for the Socialist Left Party.

He was elected to the Norwegian Parliament from Hedmark in 1985, and was re-elected on two occasions.

Sortåsløkken was a member of the municipal council for Ringsaker Municipality in 1975–1979, and a member of its executive committee in 1983–1985.
