= Olav Jørgen Sæter =

Norwegian politician

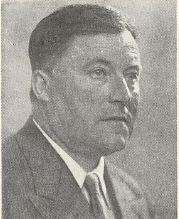

Member of the Norwegian Parliament
- In office 1921–1945
- Constituency: Hedmark

Mayor of Elverum Municipality
- In office 1931–1940

Personal details
- Born: 26 November 1884 Elverum, Norway
- Died: 24 November 1951 (aged 66)

Olav Jørgen Sæter (26 November 1884 – 24 November 1951) was a Norwegian schoolteacher, newspaper editor and politician.

== Biography ==
Sæter was born in Elverum Municipality on 26 November 1884, to farmer Oluf Sæter and Jøran Hvarstad. In 1914 he married Inga Holen (born 1887).

From 1903 to 1915, and from 1933, he worked as schoolteacher in Dovre and Elverum.

He edited the newspaper Østerdalens Sosialdemokrat from 1915 to 1932, and served as mayor of Elverum from 1931 to 1940.

He was elected representative to the Storting for six consecutive periods. The first period ran from 1922–1924, while his last period took place from 1937–1945, for the Labour Party. In the Storting, he chaired the railway committee between 1928 and 1930, and was subsequently a board member of the Norwegian State Railways.
