= Christian Erlandsen =

Norwegian physician and politician

Christian Erlandsen (2 March 1926, Aker – 10 October 2016) was a Norwegian physician and politician for the Conservative Party.

He was elected to the Norwegian Parliament from Hedmark in 1977, and was re-elected on one occasion. He later served as a deputy representative during the term 1989–1993.

On the local level he was a member of the municipal council for Stange Municipality from 1963 to 1977 and 1987 to 1995. From 1975 to 1979 and 1987 to 1999 he was a deputy member of Hedmark county council. He chaired the local party chapter from 1994 to 1999.

Outside politics he graduated with a cand.med. degree from the University of Copenhagen in 1952, specialized in psychiatry in 1963 and worked at Sanderud Hospital.
