= Oskar Edøy =

Norwegian politician

Oskar Edøy (30 August 1916 – 5 April 2008 in Edøy Municipality) was a Norwegian politician for the Labour Party.

He was elected to the Parliament of Norway from Møre og Romsdal in 1973, and was re-elected on three occasions. He had previously served as a deputy representative during the terms 1961–1965, 1965–1969 and 1969–1973 and 1973–1977. From March 1971 to October 1972 he served as a regular representative meanwhile Alv Fostervoll was appointed to the first cabinet Bratteli. From June 1973 to October 1973 he filled in for Peter Kjeldseth Moe who had died. From October 1973 to 1976 he again replaced Fostervoll.

On the local level he was a member of the executive committee of the municipal council of Sunndal Municipality from 1958 to 1959, and then served as mayor from 1959 to 1973.
