= Bjørn Hernæs =

Norwegian politician (1936–2024)

Bjørn Hernæs (23 November 1936 – 17 July 2024) was a Norwegian politician for the Conservative Party, elected to the Norwegian Parliament from Hedmark in 1993, then twice more. He was a deputy member of the municipal council for Sør-Odal Municipality from 1995 to 1999. Born in Sør-Odal on 23 November 1935, Hernæs died on 17 July 2024, at the age of 87.
