= Otto Dahl (politician) =

Norwegian politician

Otto Dahl (16 June 1914 – 16 January 1978) was a Norwegian politician for the Labour Party.

He was elected to the Norwegian Parliament from Hedmark in 1954, and was re-elected on three occasions.

Dahl was born in Hamar and involved in local politics in Hamar municipality from 1945 to 1959.
