= Johan Østby =

Norwegian politician

Johan Østby (5 March 1924 – 20 February 2005) was a Norwegian politician for the Centre Party, and journalist.

He was born in Trysil Municipality. He was member of the Norwegian Parliament Stortinget from Hedmark for 12 years, from 1965 to 1977.

Østby was a journalist in the Elverum newspaper Østlendingen from 1949 to 1991; was involved in local politics in Elverum Municipality between 1959 and 1967, and was a member of Hedmark county council from 1965 to 1967.
