= Karstein Seland =

Norwegian politician

- Born: 5 January 1912; Gyland Municipality
- Died: 13 January 2005 (aged 93)
- Citizenship: Norway
- Occupation: politician

Karstein Seland (5 January 1912 – 13 January 2005) was a Norwegian politician for the Centre Party.

He was born in Gyland Municipality in Southern Norway.

He was elected to the Norwegian Parliament from Hedmark in 1965, and was re-elected on one occasion. He had previously served in the position of deputy representative during the term 1961–1965, during which he briefly replaced Karen Grønn-Hagen who was appointed to the short-lived cabinet of John Lyng.

Seland was a member of the municipal council for Vinger Municipality (1958-1963) and later Kongsvinger Municipality (1964-1967).
