= Per Roar Bredvold =

Norwegian politician

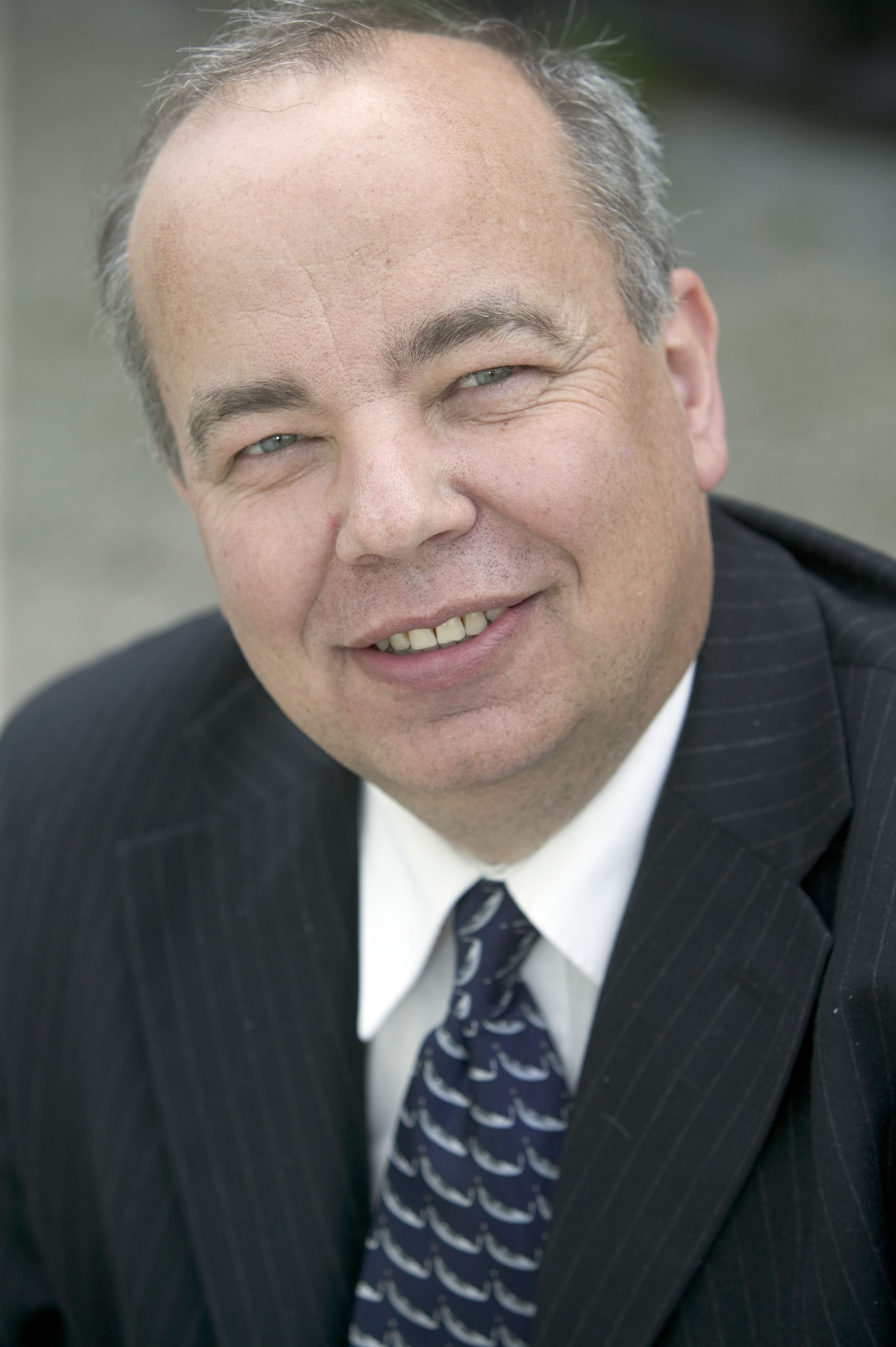
Per Roar Bredvold

Per Roar Bredvold (born 5 March 1957 in Elverum) is a Norwegian politician representing the Progress Party. He is currently a representative of Hedmark in the Storting and was first elected in 1997.

== Storting committees ==
- 2001–2009 member of the Defence committee.
- 2005–2009 member of the Election committee.
- 2001–2005 reserve member of the Extended Foreign Affairs committee.
- 1997–2001 member of the Family, Culture and Administration committee.
- 1997–2001 member of the Election committee.
