= Grethe G. Fossum =

Norwegian politician (1945–2019)

- Born: 1 November 1945; Oslo, Norway
- Died: 28 November 2019 (aged 74)
- Occupations: Teacher, Politician

Grethe G. Fossum (1 November 1945 – 28 November 2019) was a Norwegian politician. She served one term in the Storting from Hedmark from 1997 to 2001. She was also a deputy representative from 1989 to 1997 and 2001 to 2005. Fossum was a member of the Labour Party.

She was born in Oslo to Kåre Gulbrandsen and Iris Pettersen. She served as a teacher and school administrator in Grue Municipality before becoming active in Labor Party politics. She was a member of the council and deputy mayor of the town from 1987 to 1991.

She was first elected as a deputy representative in 1989 and re-elected in 1993. In her time as a deputy, she substitute for Kjell Borgen and Sigbjørn Johnsen during their terms and cabinet ministers. In the 1997 Norwegian parliamentary election, she was elected to a seat in her own right. She served on the Family, Culture and Administration committee and the Finance Committee.

In the 2001 election, Labour saw its share of seats drop from the prior election and Fossum did not hold her seat, but was again elected as a deputy. She substituted for Sylvia Brustad during the latter's term as a minister.

Fossum died on 28 November 2019 at the age of 74.
