= Gunnar Gundersen (politician) =

Norwegian politician and swimmer

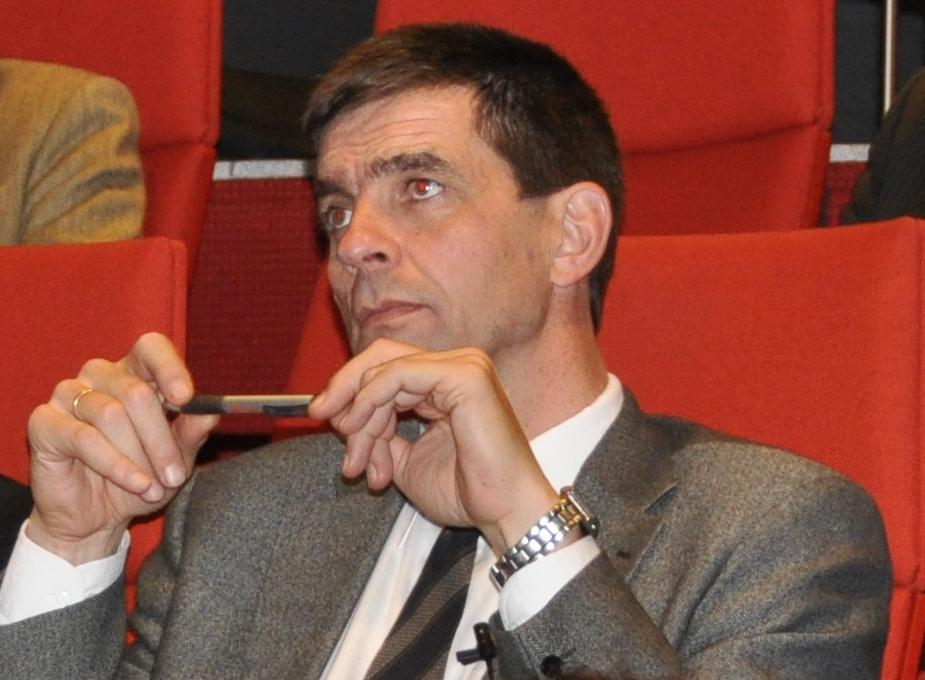
Gunnar Gundersen

Gunnar Gundersen (born 21 May 1956 in Åsnes) is a Norwegian politician for the Conservative Party.

He was elected to the Norwegian Parliament from Hedmark in 2005.

On the local level he was a deputy member of Åsnes municipal council from 1999 to 2007. He chaired the county party chapter from 2004 to 2005, and was a member of the Conservative Party central board in the same period.

He studied at the University of Wisconsin, Madison 1975-1979 and the University of California, Berkeley 1981–1982. He worked as a research assistant at the Norwegian College of Agriculture from 1982 to 1985, and then as a local businessman.

Gundersen is also a former Olympic swimmer. He competed in the men's 400 metre individual medley at the 1976 Summer Olympics. His son Tore Andreas Gundersen is a professional football player.
