= Kristian Fjeld =

Norwegian politician

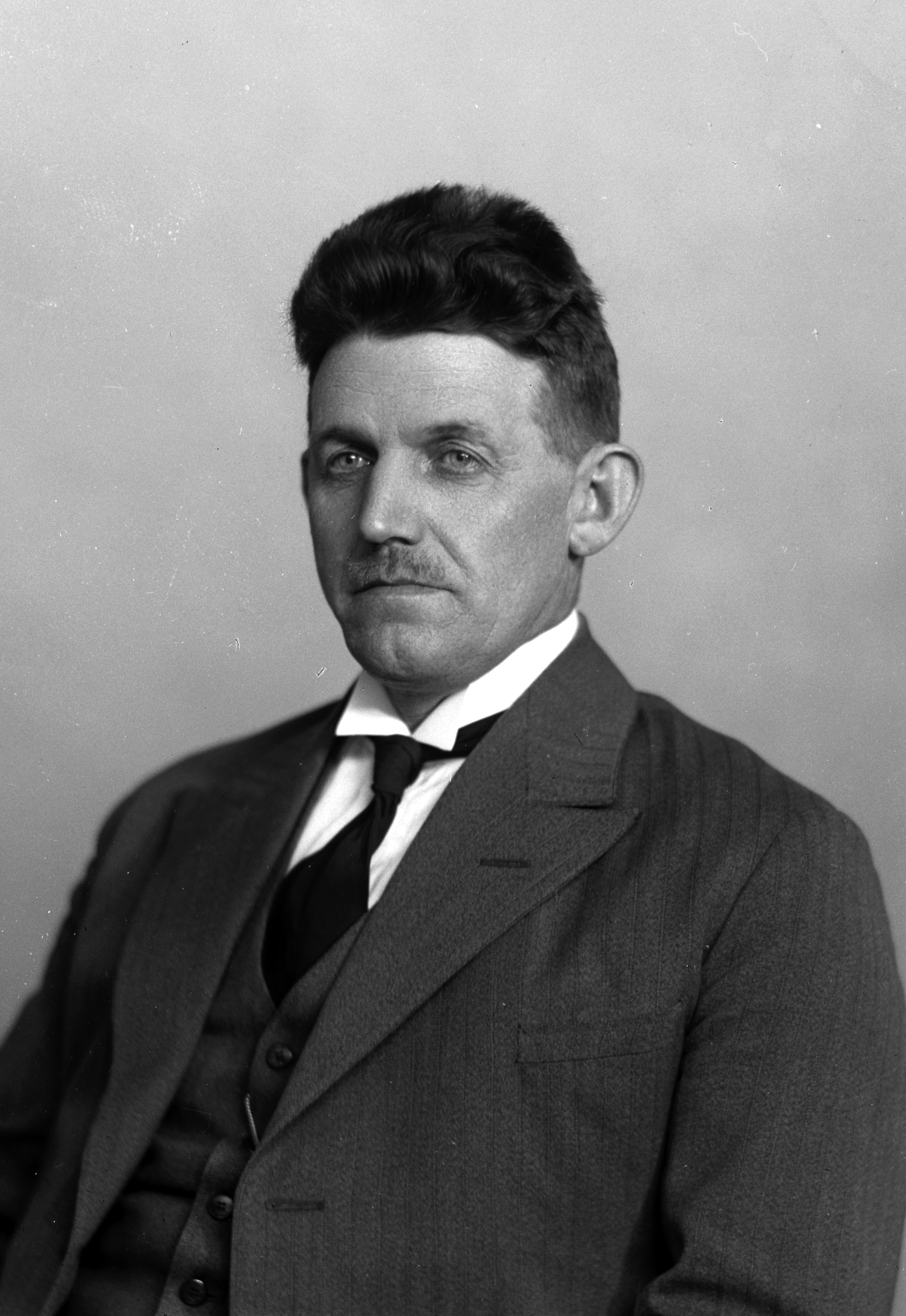
- Fjeld, some time between 1915 and 1920

Minister of Agriculture
- In office 5 November 1945 – 19 November 1951
- Prime Minister: Einar Gerhardsen
- Preceded by: Einar Frogner
- Succeeded by: Rasmus Nordbø

Member of the Norwegian Parliament
- In office 4 December 1945 – 30 September 1961
- Constituency: Hedmark

Mayor of Stange Municipality
- In office 1 January 1926 – 5 November 1945
- Preceded by: Martin Hestnæs
- Succeeded by: Chr. Stensbak

Personal details
- Born: 16 February 1887 Vestre Toten, Oppland, Sweden-Norway
- Died: 23 December 1976 (aged 89)
- Party: Labour

Kristian Fjeld (16 February 1887 – 23 December 1976) was a Norwegian politician for the Labour Party. He was Minister of Agriculture from 1945 to 1951.

Fjeld comes from Vestre Toten Municipality in Oppland county, but it was as a local politician in Stange Municipality and as a member of the parliament for Hedmark that he made his contributions to Norwegian politics.

During the occupation of Norway by Nazi Germany he was imprisoned in Hamar on 29 August 1942, and incarcerated in Grini concentration camp from 1 September 1942 to the war's end in May 1945.
