= Harald Johan Løbak =

Norwegian politician

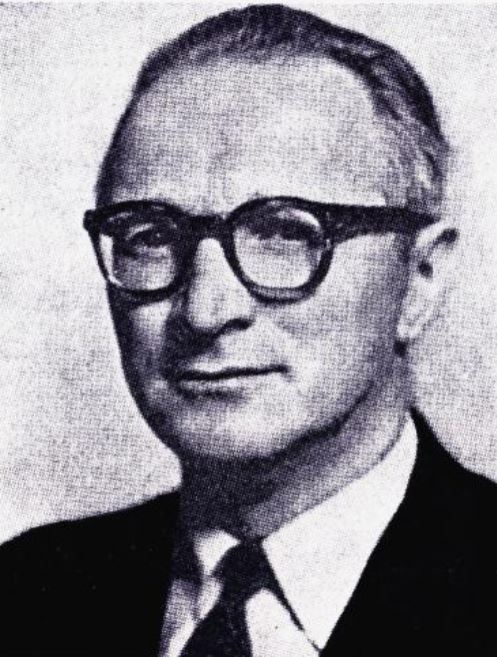

Minister of Agriculture
- In office 14 May 1956 – 23 April 1960
- Prime Minister: Einar Gerhardsen
- Preceded by: Olav Meisdalshagen
- Succeeded by: Einar Wøhni

Member of the Norwegian Parliament
- In office 4 December 1945 – 30 September 1973
- Constituency: Hedmark

Personal details
- Born: 2 June 1904 Trysil Municipality, Hedmark, United Kingdoms of Sweden and Norway
- Died: 6 February 1985 (aged 80) Trysil Municipality, Hedmark, Norway
- Party: Labour

Harald Johan Løbak (2 June 1904 – 6 February 1985) was a Norwegian politician for the Labour Party.

He was born in Trysil Municipality. He was elected to the Norwegian Parliament from Hedmark in 1945, and was re-elected on six occasions.

He was the Minister of Agriculture from May 1956 to April 1960 during the third cabinet Gerhardsen. During the period, he was replaced in the Norwegian Parliament by Haldis Tjernsberg.

On the local level, he was a member of the municipal council of Trysil Municipality from 1928 to 1955, serving as mayor from 1937 except for the period 1940–1945 during the German occupation of Norway. He chaired the county party chapter from 1952 to 1968.

Political offices
Preceded by Olav Meisdalshagen	Norwegian Minister of Agriculture; 1956–1960	Succeeded by Einar Joachim Wøhni
