= Eirin Faldet =

Norwegian politician (born 1944)

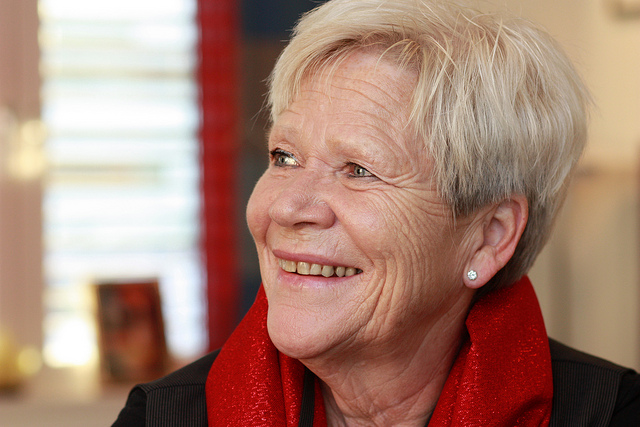
Faldet in 2012

Eirin Faldet (born 5 January 1944) is a Norwegian politician.

Faldet was born in Oslo. A member of the Labour Party, she was elected to the Norwegian Parliament from Hedmark in 1985, and has been re-elected on five occasions. She has served as Deputy President of the Storting since 2001. On the local level, she was a member of the municipal council of Trysil Municipality, from 1975 to 1978. Prior to entering politics, she was a teacher and a social worker.
