= Karsten Fonstad =

Norwegian politician

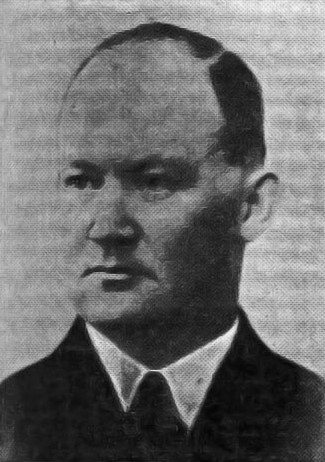
- Born: 8 July 1900; Ringsaker, Norway
- Died: 28 July 1970 (aged 70)
- Occupation: Politician
- Known for: Member of the Storting

Karsten Fonstad (8 July 1900 – 28 July 1970) was a Norwegian politician.

== Life and career ==
Fonstad was born in Ringsaker Municipality to Johannes Fonstad and Mathea Kristiansen. He was elected representative to the Storting for the periods 1934–1936 and 1937–1945, for the Labour Party.

Fonstad died on 28 July 1970, at the age of 70.
