= Haldis Tjernsberg =

Norwegian politician

Haldis Tjernsberg (12 July 1903 – 4 April 1972) was a Norwegian politician for the Labour Party.

She was born in Sande.

She was elected to the Norwegian Parliament from Hedmark in 1961, and was re-elected on one occasion. She had previously served as a deputy representative in the periods 1954–1957 and 1957–1961. During parts of both these terms she served as a regular representative meanwhile Harald Johan Løbak was appointed to the Cabinet.
