= Ottar Landfald =

Norwegian politician

Ottar Landfald (18 May 1919 – 28 December 2009) is a Norwegian politician for the Centre Party.

He was born in Verdal Municipality. He was elected to the Norwegian Parliament from Hedmark in 1973, and was re-elected on one occasion. He had previously served as a deputy representative during the term 1969–1973.

On the local level he was a member of the executive committee of the municipal council of Stange Municipality from 1955 to 1968. From 1963 to 1966 he was also a member of Hedmark county council. He chaired the county party chapter from 1966 to 1974.

Outside politics was a farmer. He was active in the Norwegian Agrarian Association.
