= Kjell Magne Fredheim =

Norwegian politician

Kjell Magne Fredheim (born 3 February 1928 in Os Municipality, Hedmark, died 28 October 2006) was a Norwegian politician for the Labour Party.

He was elected to the Norwegian Parliament from Hedmark in 1969, and was re-elected on four occasions. He had previously served as a deputy representative during the term 1965–1969.

On the local level he was a member of the municipal council for Åsnes Municipality from 1963 to 1967, serving the last two years as deputy mayor. From 1963 to 1967 he was also a member of Hedmark county council.

Outside politics he worked as a journalist in Arbeidets Rett from 1954 to 1955, and then embarked on a longer career in Glåmdalen.
