= Lars Holen =

Norwegian politician

Lars Holen (27 January 1912 – 23 August 1994) was a Norwegian politician for the Norwegian Labour Party.

He was elected to the Norwegian Parliament from Hedmark in 1965, and was re-elected on two occasions.

Holen was born in Alvdal Municipality. He became a member of the municipal council for Alvdal Municipality in 1947, became deputy mayor during the term 1959–1963 and mayor from 1963–1966.
