= Einar Frogner =

Norwegian politician

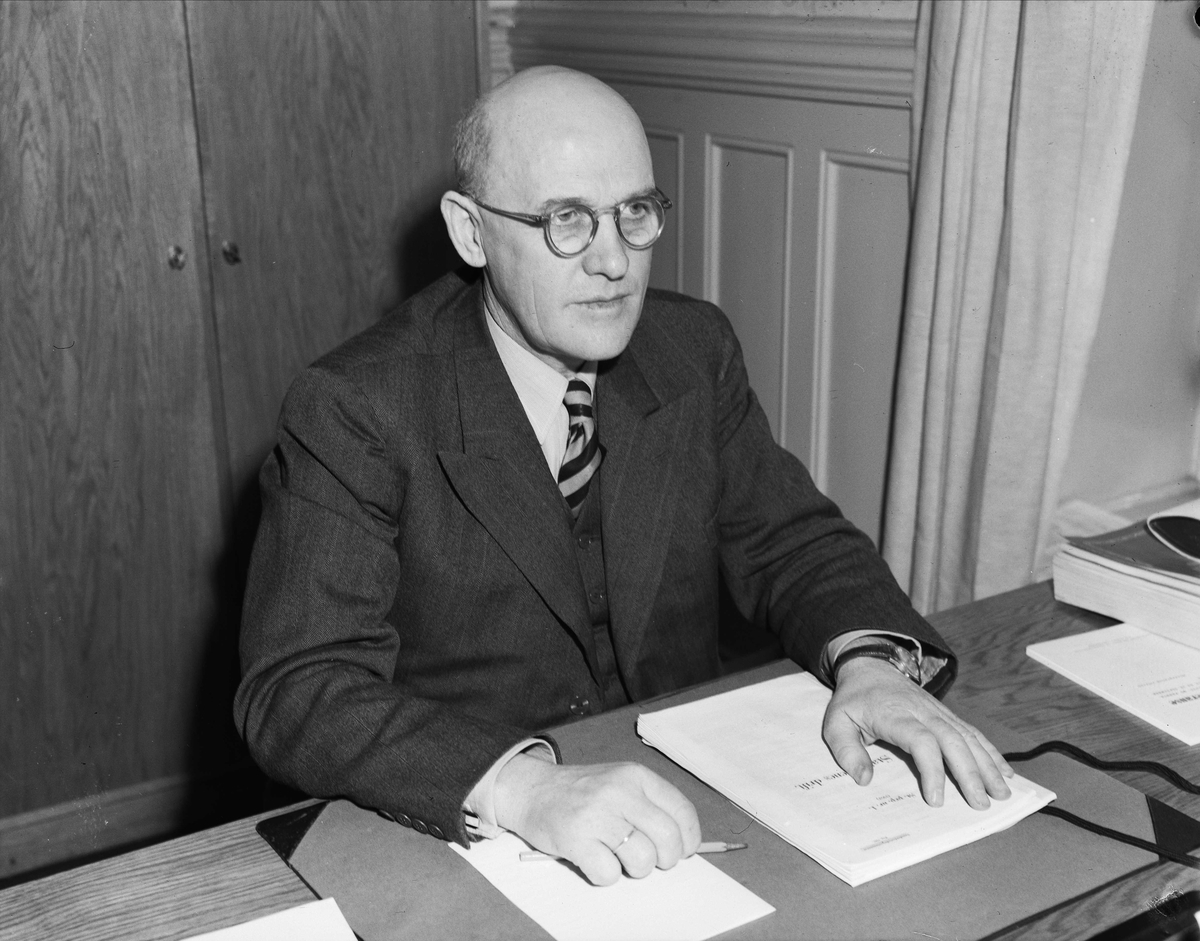
- Frogner in 1952.

Leader of the Agrarian Party
- In office 1948–1954
- Preceded by: Nils Trædal
- Succeeded by: Per Borten

Chair of the Standing Committee on Transport
- In office 23 January 1950 – 10 July 1955
- Preceded by: Position established
- Succeeded by: Elisæus Vatnaland

Minister of Agriculture
- In office 25 June 1945 – 5 November 1945
- Prime Minister: Einar Gerhardsen
- Preceded by: Hans Ystgaard
- Succeeded by: Kristian Fjeld

Member of the Norwegian Parliament
- In office 4 December 1945 – 10 July 1955
- Constituency: Hedmark

Personal details
- Born: 19 May 1893 Løten, Hedmark, Sweden-Norway
- Died: 10 July 1955 (aged 62)
- Party: Agrarian

Einar Frogner (19 May 1893 – 10 July 1955) was the leader of the Norwegian Agrarian Party 1948–1954, and Minister of Agriculture in 1945 in the Unification Cabinet of Einar Gerhardsen. Frogner was a farmer by profession.

Political offices
New office	Chair of the Standing Committee on Transport; 1950–1955	Succeeded by Elisæus Vatnaland
