= Karl Aasland =

Norwegian politician (1918–1982)

Member of the Norwegian Parliament
- In office 1969–1977

Substitute member of the Parliamentary Assembly of the Council of Europe
- In office 1974–1976

Personal details
- Born: 13 November 1918
- Died: 29 March 1982 (aged 63)
- Party: Centre Party

Karl Aasland (13 November 1918 – 29 March 1982) was a Norwegian politician for the Centre Party.

He was born in Time Municipality, and was elected to the Norwegian Parliament from Rogaland in 1969. He was re-elected on one occasion.

On the local level he was a member of the municipal council of Gjestal Municipality from 1959 to 1961 and a member of the municipal council of Stavanger Municipality from 1965 to 1967.

Outside politics he worked as a dairy director from 1947 to 1982.
