= Lauritz Bernhard Sirevaag =

Norwegian politician

Lauritz Bernhard Sirevaag (15 March 1926, Stavanger – 2016) was a Norwegian politician for the Conservative Party.

On the local level he was a member of Sandnes city council from 1963 to 1971, serving as mayor from 1967 to 1969. He was elected to the Norwegian Parliament from Rogaland in 1969, and was re-elected on one occasion. From 1991 to 1999 he was a member of Rogaland county council.

Sirevaag worked for many years as a banker. He also chaired Bryne FK. He died in 2016.
