= Arne Kielland =

Norwegian politician

- Born: 8 September 1939; Skien, Norway
- Died: 6 July 2003 (aged 63)
- Occupations: Journalist and politician

Arne Kielland (8 September 1939 – 6 July 2003) was a Norwegian journalist and politician for the Norwegian Labour Party and later the Socialist Left Party (SV). He was a member of the Parliament of Norway from 1969 to 1973, representing Sør-Trøndelag, and from 1973 to 1977, representing Telemark.
