= Bjørn Unneberg =

Norwegian politician (1928–2020)

Bjørn Unneberg (23 February 1928 – 5 January 2020) was a Norwegian politician for the Centre Party.

He was born in Stokke as a son of school inspector Agnar Unneberg (1903–1988) and housewife Bergljot Lærum (1901–1988). He graduated with the cand.jur. degree in 1949, and after worked as a research fellow on Slavic languages and culture at the University of Prague from 1949 to 1950, he continued working mostly in the legal system. He worked in Eidsivating Court of Appeal from 1951 to 1953, then two years as a junior solicitor. From 1955 to 1963 he was a consultant in Widerøes Flyveselskap, then as an office manager in Anderson & Skjånes from 1963 to 1969. From 1968 to 1978 he edited the Centre Party periodical Senit. He had settled on the farm Brudalen in Ullensaker in 1957, and from 1977 to 1997 he was the district stipendiary magistrate in Eidsvoll District Court.

In 1963, during the short-lived Lyng's Cabinet, he was appointed State Secretary in the Ministry of Transport. He was elected to the Parliament of Norway from Akershus in 1969, and was re-elected on one occasion in 1973, serving two terms. In his last term he chaired the Standing Committee on Justice.

On the local level he was a member of the school board from 1960 to 1963, and of the executive committee of Ullensaker municipal council from 1959 to 1971. From 1967 to 1977 he was a member of Akershus county council. He was a central board member of the Centre Party from 1977 to 1979.
