= Else Repål =

Norwegian politician (1930–2015)

Else Marie Myhren Repål (20 February 1930 – 19 April 2015) was a Norwegian politician for the Labour Party.

She was elected to the Norwegian Parliament from Hedmark in 1969, and was re-elected on two occasions. She served as a deputy representative during the term 1981–1985. She settled in Rena in Åmot Municipality and chaired the municipal party chapter from 1968 to 1969.
