= Harry Hansen (politician) =

Norwegian politician

Harry Hansen (born 14 January 1919 in Bergen, died 5 September 2003) was a Norwegian politician for the Labour Party.

He was elected to the Norwegian Parliament from Buskerud in 1969, and was re-elected on two occasions. He had previously served as a deputy representative during the term 1954–1957.

On the local level he was a member of Bergen city council from 1951 to 1969, serving as deputy mayor from 1955 to 1959 and mayor from 1963 to 1969.

| Preceded by August D. Michelsen | Mayor of Bergen; 1963–1969 | Succeeded by Ragnar Juell Morken |
