= Troms (Storting constituency) =

Constituency of the Storting, the national legislature of Norway

- Romsa; Tromssa; Tromssa
- Constituency for the Storting
- Location of Troms within Norway
- Municipality: List: Balsfjord; Bardu; Dyrøy; Gratangen; Harstad; Ibestad; Gáivuotna-Kåfjord; Karlsøy; Kvæfjord; Kvænangen; Lavangen; Lyngen; Målselv; Nordreisa; Salangen; Senja; Skjervøy; Sørreisa; Storfjord; Tjeldsund; Tromsø
- County: Troms
- Population: 169,610 (2024)
- Electorate: 126,368 (2025)
- Area: 26,189 km^{2} (2024)

Current constituency
- Created: 1921
- Seats: List: 5 (2013–present); 6 (1953–2013); 5 (1921–1953)
- Members of the Storting: List: Per-Willy Amundsen (FrP); Erlend Svardal Bøe (H); Kristian Eilertsen (FrP); Nils-Ole Foshaug (Ap); Cecilie Myrseth (Ap); Hanne Stenvaag (R)
- Created from: List: Trondenes; Senjen; Malangen; Lyngdal

Troms (Northern Sami: Romsa; Kven: Tromssa; Finnish: Tromssa) is one of the 19 multi-member constituencies of the Storting, the national legislature of Norway. The constituency was established in 1921 following the introduction of proportional representation for elections to the Storting. It is conterminous with the county of Troms. The constituency currently elects eight of the 169 members of the Storting using the open party-list proportional representation electoral system. At the 2025 parliamentary election it had 126,368 registered electors.

== Electoral system ==
Troms currently elects five of the 169 members of the Storting using the open (Note: Although technically elections to the Storting have open lists, they are in effect closed lists as a majority of those voting for a party must make changes to the lists for the changes to take effect, which has never happened since the introduction of proportional representation in 1921, and as result candidates are elected in the order submitted by the party.) party-list proportional representation electoral system. Constituency seats are allocated by the County Electoral Committee using the Modified Sainte-Laguë method. Compensatory seats (seats at large) are calculated based on the national vote and are allocated by the National Electoral Committee using the Modified Sainte-Laguë method at the constituency level (one for each constituency). Only parties that reach the 4% national threshold compete for compensatory seats.

== Election results ==
=== Summary ===
Election	Socialist Left SV / SF			Labour Ap			Greens MDG			Centre Sp / Bp / L			Liberals V			Christian Democrats KrF			Conservatives H			Progress FrP / ALP		
Election	Votes	%	Seats	Votes	%	Seats	Votes	%	Seats	Votes	%	Seats	Votes	%	Seats	Votes	%	Seats	Votes	%	Seats	Votes	%	Seats
2025	7,027	7.20%	0	28,812	29.53%	2	3,524	3.61%	0	6,136	6.29%	0	1,951	2.00%	0	2,845	2.92%	0	10,606	10.87%	1	25,124	25.75%	2
2021	10,029	10.82%	0	25,168	27.17%	2	2,768	2.99%	0	17,698	19.09%	1	2,298	2.48%	0	2,062	2.22%	0	12,493	13.48%	1	12,998	14.02%	1
2017	9,213	10.12%	0	21,882	24.03%	2	2,588	2.84%	0	13,640	14.98%	1	2,674	2.94%	0	2,408	2.64%	0	18,709	20.54%	1	16,604	18.23%	1
2013	5,688	6.44%	0	27,436	31.08%	2	2,190	2.48%	0	5,636	6.38%	0	3,687	4.18%	0	3,659	4.15%	0	19,663	22.28%	2	17,315	19.62%	1
2009	6,275	7.45%	0	30,942	36.74%	3	255	0.30%	0	7,015	8.33%	0	2,150	2.55%	0	3,042	3.61%	0	10,846	12.88%	1	21,224	25.20%	2
2005	8,109	9.64%	1	27,757	33.01%	3	124	0.15%	0	6,456	7.68%	0	2,634	3.13%	0	3,757	4.47%	0	7,548	8.98%	0	19,236	22.88%	2
2001	12,007	14.77%	1	18,008	22.15%	2	117	0.14%	0	5,266	6.48%	0	1,915	2.36%	0	9,925	12.21%	1	12,739	15.67%	1	11,442	14.07%	1
1997	6,150	7.39%	0	28,670	34.46%	2	214	0.26%	0	9,520	11.44%	1	2,916	3.51%	0	12,833	15.43%	1	9,393	11.29%	1	10,578	12.72%	1
1993	10,238	12.73%	1	28,826	35.84%	2				17,922	22.28%	2	2,567	3.19%	0	4,964	6.17%	0	11,028	13.71%	1	3,399	4.23%	0
1989	11,955	13.85%	1	32,481	37.63%	3	300	0.35%	0	3,747	4.34%	0	2,396	2.78%	0	6,197	7.18%	0	18,104	20.97%	1	9,832	11.39%	1
1985	5,667	6.64%	0	40,730	47.72%	3				4,297	5.03%	0	2,125	2.49%	0	5,946	6.97%	1	23,204	27.19%	2	2,039	2.39%	0
1981	4,490	5.51%	0	32,831	40.32%	3				5,040	6.19%	0	2,966	3.64%	0	6,946	8.53%	1	24,783	30.44%	2	2,471	3.03%	0
1977	3,462	4.78%	0	32,292	44.58%	3				6,022	8.31%	0	2,148	2.97%	0	9,230	12.74%	1	16,070	22.18%	2	1,241	1.71%	0
1973	8,728	13.54%	1	23,422	36.33%	2				12,245^{1}	14.12%^{1}	1	12,245^{1}	14.12%^{1}	1	6,768	10.50%	1	8,789	13.63%	1	2,921	4.53%	0
1969	2,437	3.70%	0	36,549	55.45%	3				9,364^{1}	14.21%^{1}	1	7,483	11.35%	1	9,364^{1}	14.21%^{1}	1	9,592	14.55%	1			
1965	3,147	5.29%	0	28,861	48.55%	3				8,054	13.55%	1	7,884	13.26%	1				10,783	18.14%	1			
1961				27,550	54.37%	4				4,034	7.96%	0	6,012	11.87%	1	3,650	7.20%	0	8,045	15.88%	1			
1957				27,470	54.84%	4				3,584	7.15%	0	5,971	11.92%	1	4,258	8.50%	0	6,902	13.78%	1			
1953				27,559	55.13%	4							8,408	16.82%	1	4,842	9.69%	0	6,280	12.56%	1			
1949				24,758	57.97%	4							6,622	15.50%	1	2,864	6.71%	0	5,216	12.21%	0			
1945				18,407	57.52%	4							5,475	17.11%	1				3,921	12.25%	0			
1936				20,047	52.87%	3				2,017^{1}	5.32%^{1}	0	6,664	17.57%	1				4,547^{1}	11.99%^{1}	1			
1933				17,593	54.65%	3				2,479^{1}	7.70%^{1}	0	7,150	22.21%	1				3,320^{1}	10.31%^{1}	1			
1930				12,032	40.59%	2				3,398^{1}	11.45%^{1}	1	8,472	28.58%	1				5,519^{1}	18.60%^{1}	1			
1927				12,367	53.10%	4				1,739	7.47%	0	5,143	22.08%	1				4,756	12.82%	0			
1924				6,564	28.87%	2				1,844	8.11%	0	5,406	23.78%	2				4,756	20.92%	1			
1921				7,330	33.80%	2				2,022	9.32%	0	4,672	21.54%	1				4,836	22.30%	1			

(Excludes compensatory seats. Figures in italics represent joint lists.)

=== Detailed ===
==== 2020s ====
===== 2025 =====
Results of the 2025 parliamentary election held on 8 September 2025:

Party		Votes	%	Seats		
Party		Votes	%	Con.	Com.	Tot.
Labour Party	Ap	28,812	29.53%	2	0	2
Progress Party	FrP	25,124	25.75%	2	0	2
Conservative Party	H	10,606	10.87%	1	0	1
Red Party	R	7,260	7.44%	0	1	1
Socialist Left Party	SV	7,027	7.20%	0	0	0
Centre Party	Sp	6,136	6.29%	0	0	0
Green Party	MDG	3,524	3.61%	0	0	0
Christian Democratic Party	KrF	2,845	2.92%	0	0	0
Liberal Party	V	1,951	2.00%	0	0	0
Industry and Business Party	INP	999	1.02%	0	0	0
Norway Democrats	ND	741	0.76%	0	0	0
Generation Party	GP	730	0.75%	0	0	0
Pensioners' Party	PP	614	0.63%	0	0	0
Conservative	K	383	0.39%	0	0	0
Peace and Justice	FOR	307	0.31%	0	0	0
DNI Party	DNI	261	0.27%	0	0	0
Welfare and Innovation Party	VIP	143	0.15%	0	0	0
Partiet Sentrum	S	100	0.10%	0	0	0
Valid votes		97,563	100.00%	5	1	6
Blank votes		1,077	0.85%			
Rejected votes – other		70	0.06%			
Total polled		98,710	78.11%			
Registered electors		126,368				

The following candidates were elected: Per-Willy Amundsen (FrP); Erlend Svardal Bøe (H); Kristian August Eilertsen (FrP); Nils-Ole Foshaug (Ap); Cecilie Myrseth (Ap); and Hanne Beate Stenvaag (R).

Votes by municipality
Party		Votes per municipality																					Total Votes
Party		Bals.	Bar.	Dyr.	Gáivu.	Great.	Hars.	Ibe.	Karl.	Kvæf.	Kvæn.	Loab.	Lyn.	Måls.	Nord.	Sala.	Senj.	Skje.	Sørr.	Stor.	Tjel.	Trom.	Total Votes
Labour Party	Ap	785	780	203	321	128	4,542	229	347	498	149	204	428	1,320	675	376	2,217	333	611	275	764	13,627	28,812
Progress Party	FrP	1,075	579	220	313	166	3,995	220	402	425	252	115	475	925	890	244	2,537	434	768	10,157	768	10,157	25,124
Conservative Party	H	232	243	43	47	22	1,815	116	66	114	33	57	144	358	186	73	877	82	290	5,538	290	5,538	10,606
Red Party	R	219	97	36	137	50	792	61	94	97	51	32	100	238	188	104	412	77	107	4,153	107	4,153	7,260
Socialist Left Party	SV	142	114	30	55	26	761	14	91	115	35	15	53	145	168	92	409	79	124	4,407	124	4,407	7,027
Centre Party	Sp	363	380	82	112	82	753	57	107	173	50	91	131	554	203	186	568	100	207	1,624	207	1,624	6,136
Green Party	MDG	48	43	15	23	5	480	4	18	37	5	5	32	67	45	26	140	16	41	2,424	41	2,424	3,524
Christian Democratic Party	KrF	65	27	7	116	18	329	9	13	31	27	16	163	73	155	29	239	179	58	1,189	58	1,189	2,845
Liberal Party	V	21	41	2	1	9	294	15	13	36	3	3	29	80	27	12	93	15	29	1,202	29	1,202	1,951
Industry and Business Party	INP	41	16	11	8	7	163	8	19	16	4	6	13	33	35	7	209	14	21	309	21	309	999
Norway Democrats	ND	45	17	7	3	2	107	4	14	14	9	7	7	31	16	8	73	8	22	314	22	314	741
Generation Party	GP	23	16	4	10	5	130	6	7	12	10	5	12	32	15	7	77	14	26	292	26	292	730
Pensioners' Party	PP	25	17	2	9	0	106	0	17	13	3	2	27	32	12	6	42	12	18	249	18	249	614
Conservative	K	36	5	3	7	5	45	4	6	10	4	1	13	11	19	1	38	5	10	143	10	143	383
Peace and Justice	FOR	14	1	0	5	0	23	0	2	3	5	0	8	12	7	3	21	4	8	178	8	178	307
DNI Party	DNI	21	8	13	2	1	33	2	6	4	7	0	10	25	11	10	26	4	0	69	0	69	261
Welfare and Innovation Party	VIP	6	4	0	1	0	15	2	0	1	1	4	0	7	2	2	6	2	6	77	6	77	143
Partiet Sentrum	S	2	3	0	0	1	9	0	1	0	1	0	2	3	0	2	6	0	3	66	3	66	100
Valid votes		3,163	2,391	678	1,170	527	14,392	751	1,223	1,599	649	563	1,647	3,946	2,654	1,188	7,990	1,386	2,005	1,129	2,502	46,018	97,563
Blank votes		38	38	12	9	8	143	6	14	19	9	6	14	47	24	10	87	8	25	16	26	518	1,077
Rejected votes – other		8	1	0	2	0	25	0	0	2	0	0	0	0	1	0	5	0	2	0	7	17	70
Total polled		3,209	2,430	690	1,181	535	14,560	757	1,237	1,620	658	569	1,661	3,993	2,679	1,198	8,082	1,386	2,032	1,145	2,535	46,553	98,710
Registered electors		4,263	2,996	857	1,572	789	19,123	1,004	1,669	2,157	907	745	2,169	5,183	3,650	1,573	10,895	1,951	2,593	1,434	3,248	57,590	126,368
Turnout		75.28%	81.11%	80.51%	75.13%	67.81%	76.14%	75.40%	74.12%	75.10%	72.55%	76.38%	76.58%	77.04%	73.40%	76.16%	74.18%	71.04%	78.36%	79.85%	78.05%	80.84%	78.11%

===== 2021 =====
Results of the 2021 parliamentary election held on 13 September 2021:

Party		Votes	%	Seats		
Party		Votes	%	Con.	Com.	Tot.
Labour Party	Ap	25,168	27.17%	2	0	2
Centre Party	Sp	17,698	19.09%	1	0	1
Progress Party	FrP	12,998	14.02%	1	0	1
Conservative Party	H	12,493	13.48%	1	0	1
Socialist Left Party	SV	10,029	10.82%	0	1	1
Red Party	R	4,455	4.81%	0	0	0
Green Party	MDG	2,768	2.99%	0	0	0
Liberal Party	V	2,298	2.48%	0	0	0
Christian Democratic Party	KrF	2,062	2.22%	0	0	0
Democrats in Norway		1,370	1.48%	0	0	0
Industry and Business Party	INP	319	0.34%	0	0	0
Health Party		225	0.24%	0	0	0
Capitalist Party	Lib	187	0.20%	0	0	0
The Christians	PDK	186	0.20%	0	0	0
Partiet Sentrum	S	175	0.19%	0	0	0
People's Action No to More Road Tolls		130	0.14%	0	0	0
Pirate Party of Norway	PIR	83	0.09%	0	0	0
Alliance - Alternative for Norway		66	0.07%	0	0	0
Valid votes		92,710	100.00%	5	1	6
Blank votes		811	0.65%			
Rejected votes – other		137	0.11%			
Total polled		93,658	75.05%			
Registered electors		124,791				

The following candidates were elected: Per-Willy Amundsen (FrP); Sandra Borch (Sp); Erlend Svardal Bøe (H); Nils-Ole Foshaug (Ap); Torgeir Knag Fylkesnes (SV); and Cecilie Myrseth (Ap).

Votes by municipality
Party		Votes per municipality																					Total Votes
Party		Bals.	Bar.	Dyr.	Gáivu.	Great.	Hars.	Ibe.	Karl.	Kvæf.	Kvæn.	Loab.	Lyn.	Måls.	Nord.	Sala.	Senj.	Skje.	Sørr.	Stor.	Tjel.	Trom.	Total Votes
Labour Party	Ap	708	711	158	305	136	4,057	210	306	443	181	192	437	1,213	620	295	2,176	305	593	259	770	11,093	25,168
Centre Party	Sp	1,016	862	209	331	198	2,121	207	330	386	153	199	376	1,360	668	468	1,842	347	465	5,286	465	5,286	17,698
Progress Party	FrP	564	212	113	172	106	2,078	110	255	233	139	60	340	345	485	106	1,216	274	421	5,316	421	5,316	12,998
Conservative Party	H	275	286	61	60	47	2,444	132	84	193	51	68	157	315	270	85	1,030	115	395	6,116	395	6,116	12,493
Socialist Left Party	SV	178	116	65	81	38	1,067	21	153	157	42	14	90	216	234	130	528	135	105	6,452	105	6,452	10,029
Red Party	R	111	53	12	72	23	567	21	35	63	17	19	42	133	85	49	255	41	71	2,682	71	2,682	4,455
Green Party	MDG	42	51	7	22	5	345	6	10	28	5	4	29	53	35	23	123	11	49	1,872	49	1,872	2,768
Liberal Party	V	24	53	4	6	4	365	9	13	44	4	3	14	84	19	10	97	10	28	1,474	28	1,474	2,298
Christian Democratic Party	KrF	57	17	6	73	12	237	10	6	24	26	10	90	32	133	27	220	123	30	875	30	875	2,062
Democrats in Norway		64	24	31	16	7	195	16	33	12	12	16	29	53	45	15	162	15	46	524	46	524	1,370
Industry and Business Party		19	4	2	4	0	47	10	1	3	2	1	6	15	18	4	51	5	11	107	11	107	319
Health Party		5	0	1	3	1	49	2	3	3	3	1	1	5	5	1	17	0	25	96	25	96	225
Capitalist Party	Lib	7	5	0	3	0	8	0	4	0	1	1	4	10	6	1	17	2	1	107	1	107	187
The Christians	PDK	20	2	6	6	2	24	1	2	2	0	0	1	7	6	3	18	0	8	74	8	74	186
Partiet Sentrum	S	1	6	0	0	1	26	1	4	4	2	0	2	0	1	0	13	3	5	100	5	100	175
People's Action No to More Road Tolls		2	0	2	0	0	12	0	2	0	2	0	2	3	0	0	3	0	0	99	0	99	130
Pirate Party of Norway	PIR	2	0	0	0	0	3	0	1	2	0	0	2	2	7	1	4	1	4	53	4	53	83
Alliance - Alternative for Norway		2	0	0	0	0	8	0	0	1	0	1	0	4	0	1	12	1	1	31	1	31	66
Valid votes		3,097	2,402	677	1,154	580	13,653	756	1,242	1,598	640	589	1,622	3,850	2,637	1,219	7,784	1,388	1,898	1,132	2,435	42,357	92,710
Blank votes		38	30	8	6	5	110	3	13	12	7	3	11	38	17	11	62	14	20	5	17	381	811
Rejected votes – other		0	0	5	2	0	40	0	1	0	1	3	2	2	0	2	15	2	0	0	0	62	137
Total polled		3,135	2,432	690	1,162	585	13,803	759	1,256	1,610	648	595	1,635	3,890	2,654	1,232	7,861	1,404	1,918	1,137	2,452	42,800	93,658
Registered electors		4,300	3,069	881	1,634	805	18,875	1,051	1,687	2,198	926	777	2,208	5,163	3,682	1,623	10,911	1,994	2,616	1,436	3,252	55,703	124,791
Turnout		72.91%	79.24%	78.32%	71.11%	72.67%	73.13%	72.22%	74.45%	73.25%	69.98%	76.58%	74.05%	75.34%	72.08%	75.91%	72.05%	70.41%	73.32%	79.18%	75.40%	76.84%	75.05%

==== 2010s ====
===== 2017 =====
Results of the 2017 parliamentary election held on 11 September 2017:

Party		Votes	%	Seats		
Party		Votes	%	Con.	Com.	Tot.
Labour Party	Ap	21,882	24.03%	2	0	2
Conservative Party	H	18,709	20.54%	1	0	1
Progress Party	FrP	16,604	18.23%	1	0	1
Centre Party	Sp	13,640	14.98%	1	0	1
Socialist Left Party	SV	9,213	10.12%	0	1	1
Liberal Party	V	2,674	2.94%	0	0	0
Green Party	MDG	2,588	2.84%	0	0	0
Christian Democratic Party	KrF	2,408	2.64%	0	0	0
Red Party	R	2,081	2.29%	0	0	0
Capitalist Party	Lib	300	0.33%	0	0	0
Health Party		289	0.32%	0	0	0
Coastal Party	KP	173	0.19%	0	0	0
The Christians	PDK	160	0.18%	0	0	0
Democrats in Norway		119	0.13%	0	0	0
The Alliance		115	0.13%	0	0	0
Nordting		59	0.06%	0	0	0
Communist Party of Norway	NKP	56	0.06%	0	0	0
Valid votes		91,070	100.00%	5	1	6
Blank votes		720	0.78%			
Rejected votes – other		122	0.13%			
Total polled		91,912	75.61%			
Registered electors		121,560				

The following candidates were elected: Per-Willy Amundsen (FrP); Sandra Borch (Sp); Torgeir Knag Fylkesnes (SV); Kent Gudmundsen (H); Martin Henriksen (Ap); and Cecilie Myrseth (Ap).

Votes by municipality
Party		Votes per municipality																								Total Votes
Party		Bals.	Bar.	Berg	Dyr.	Gáivu.	Great.	Hars.	Ibe.	Karl.	Kvæf.	Kvæn.	Lava.	Lenv.	Lyn.	Måls.	Nord.	Sala.	Skån.	Skje.	Sørr.	Stor.	Tors.	Tran.	Trom.	Total Votes
Labour Party	Ap	741	554	112	163	300	166	3,640	207	268	432	187	190	1,284	389	806	627	359	503	308	491	270	178	248	9,459	21,882
Conservative Party	H	523	424	77	102	129	97	3,308	182	132	277	91	116	1,235	344	445	449	172	479	220	292	194	67	154	9,200	18,709
Progress Party	FrP	775	245	93	186	209	110	2,924	161	317	324	181	86	1,401	351	494	556	164	325	338	362	220	87	139	6,556	16,604
Centre Party	Sp	710	811	166	176	301	124	1,410	167	259	314	133	189	1,063	294	1,598	510	367	195	252	536	189	118	197	3,561	13,640
Socialist Left Party	SV	176	87	28	48	79	39	906	23	157	141	20	16	362	87	213	159	106	82	111	120	85	18	53	6,097	9,213
Liberal Party	V	43	45	2	13	14	8	375	14	25	59	10	5	95	21	108	32	8	33	20	33	13	3	20	1,675	2,674
Green Party	MDG	54	44	3	9	53	9	344	7	22	37	10	7	97	48	59	56	16	26	16	12	33	3	24	1,599	2,588
Christian Democratic Party	KrF	93	22	10	13	66	19	288	17	17	29	31	11	254	84	52	120	39	32	117	39	32	13	13	997	2,408
Red Party	R	44	20	3	5	33	6	224	8	14	27	2	1	56	19	55	36	26	20	15	14	23	5	11	1,414	2,081
Capitalist Party	Lib	8	7	0	2	2	3	28	1	6	7	0	1	15	7	12	11	1	2	3	3	5	0	2	174	300
Health Party		7	3	2	2	2	3	53	0	3	8	2	3	16	9	7	4	4	14	1	4	0	1	3	138	289
Coastal Party	KP	5	2	1	2	1	1	22	2	5	0	3	0	20	4	2	1	0	3	8	1	2	8	0	80	173
The Christians	PDK	19	2	3	0	2	1	12	3	6	3	3	0	6	0	8	9	0	1	1	3	3	0	0	75	160
Democrats in Norway		2	9	0	1	0	1	16	0	1	2	0	2	8	4	5	0	0	2	1	6	1	0	2	56	119
The Alliance		6	4	0	0	4	3	20	1	4	1	0	1	6	0	1	1	2	1	0	2	3	0	0	55	115
Nordting		2	1	0	0	1	0	3	0	1	0	0	0	4	0	5	1	0	0	0	0	0	0	0	41	59
Communist Party of Norway	NKP	1	2	2	0	2	0	8	0	0	1	0	0	5	1	6	1	0	0	1	0	1	0	4	21	56
Valid votes		3,209	2,282	502	722	1,198	590	13,581	793	1,237	1,662	673	628	5,927	1,662	3,876	2,573	1,264	1,718	1,412	1,918	1,074	501	870	41,198	92,710
Blank votes		29	15	2	4	6	3	107	2	9	17	3	2	32	13	23	20	10	8	17	20	8	4	6	360	811
Rejected votes – other		4	1	1	0	0	1	25	1	2	4	0	1	8	6	2	4	0	0	3	4	0	4	4	48	137
Total polled		3,242	2,298	505	726	1,204	594	13,713	796	1,247	1,683	676	631	5,967	1,681	3,901	2,597	1,274	1,726	1,432	1,942	1,082	509	880	41,606	93,658
Registered electors		4,359	2,992	640	918	1,674	824	18,583	1,095	1,733	2,252	963	786	8,465	2,251	5,215	3,699	1,666	2,270	2,071	2,566	1,403	639	1,149	53,347	124,791
Turnout		74.37%	76.80%	78.91%	79.08%	71.92%	72.09%	73.79%	72.69%	71.96%	74.73%	70.20%	80.28%	70.49%	74.68%	74.80%	70.21%	76.47%	76.04%	69.15%	75.68%	77.12%	79.66%	76.59%	77.99%	75.05%

===== 2013 =====
Results of the 2013 parliamentary election held on 11 September 2017:

Party		Votes	%	Seats		
Party		Votes	%	Con.	Com.	Tot.
Labour Party	Ap	27,436	31.08%	2	0	2
Conservative Party	H	19,663	22.28%	2	0	2
Progress Party	FrP	17,315	19.62%	1	0	1
Socialist Left Party	SV	5,688	6.44%	0	1	1
Centre Party	Sp	5,636	6.38%	0	0	0
Liberal Party	V	3,687	4.18%	0	0	0
Christian Democratic Party	KrF	3,659	4.15%	0	0	0
Green Party	MDG	2,190	2.48%	0	0	0
Red Party	R	1,608	1.82%	0	0	0
Coastal Party	KP	477	0.54%	0	0	0
Pirate Party of Norway	PIR	382	0.43%	0	0	0
The Christians	PDK	322	0.36%	0	0	0
Christian Unity Party	KSP	92	0.10%	0	0	0
Communist Party of Norway	NKP	78	0.09%	0	0	0
Democrats in Norway		37	0.04%	0	0	0
Valid votes		88,270	100.00%	5	1	6
Blank votes		490	0.52%			
Rejected votes – other		96	0.11%			
Total polled		88,856	74.91%			
Registered electors		118,612				

The following candidates were elected: Elisabeth Vik Aspaker (H); Torgeir Knag Fylkesnes (SV); Kent Gudmundsen (H); Martin Henriksen (Ap); Tove Karoline Knutsen (Ap); and Øyvind Korsberg (FrP).

Votes by municipality
Party		Votes per municipality																								Total Votes
Party		Bals.	Bar.	Berg	Dyr.	Gáivu.	Great.	Hars.	Ibe.	Karl.	Kvæf.	Kvæn.	Lava.	Lenv.	Lyn.	Måls.	Nord.	Sala.	Skån.	Skje.	Sørr.	Stor.	Tors.	Tran.	Trom.	Total Votes
Labour Party	Ap	990	786	189	221	362	214	4,284	256	396	461	224	236	1,600	511	1,149	794	413	579	393	598	388	216	301	11,875	27,436
Conservative Party	H	550	659	81	117	147	94	3,081	188	189	284	120	114	1,240	385	793	476	231	410	282	373	177	96	166	9,410	19,663
Progress Party	FrP	720	306	129	171	224	127	3,274	192	365	343	188	108	1,549	375	637	551	208	377	298	376	245	85	181	6,286	17,315
Socialist Left Party	SV	110	55	26	27	47	23	537	20	58	108	30	9	186	64	133	152	78	65	74	66	58	17	38	3,707	5,688
Centre Party	Sp	340	284	32	133	161	89	664	95	82	196	38	97	529	125	505	232	180	87	116	319	65	62	89	1,116	5,636
Liberal Party	V	65	80	16	12	17	9	519	27	28	96	8	5	196	33	192	70	24	56	41	46	30	3	39	2,075	3,687
Christian Democratic Party	KrF	161	31	22	32	137	24	422	25	49	53	42	32	308	136	95	200	49	49	195	78	43	18	29	1,429	3,659
Green Party	MDG	46	23	6	11	52	15	297	3	21	33	6	5	82	41	69	46	14	28	29	14	41	1	17	1,290	2,190
Red Party	R	38	15	4	4	32	3	144	6	15	23	4	1	42	15	23	23	15	15	12	8	12	3	9	1,142	1,608
Coastal Party	KP	27	1	6	2	21	3	28	4	35	5	26	0	44	11	3	18	2	1	30	3	5	17	1	184	477
Pirate Party of Norway	PIR	5	6	0	1	0	0	55	1	2	5	2	1	14	5	8	10	5	9	3	5	4	0	1	240	382
The Christians	PDK	28	6	0	1	25	4	37	11	8	6	4	0	29	7	10	7	2	5	6	1	7	0	3	115	322
Christian Unity Party	KSP	8	0	0	0	4	0	13	2	0	4	0	0	13	1	2	2	2	0	6	3	0	0	0	32	92
Communist Party of Norway	NKP	1	2	1	1	1	1	6	0	2	1	0	1	9	1	2	2	0	1	1	3	2	0	6	34	78
Democrats in Norway		2	2	0	0	0	0	4	0	0	0	0	0	2	0	1	1	0	0	0	1	0	0	0	24	37
Valid votes		3,091	2,256	512	733	1,230	606	13,365	830	1,250	1,618	692	609	5,843	1,710	3,622	2,584	1,223	1,682	1,486	1,902	1,077	518	880	38,959	92,710
Blank votes		20	5	0	1	4	1	79	4	4	6	6	7	16	4	22	17	7	6	8	8	11	2	1	251	811
Rejected votes – other		2	2	1	1	0	0	38	0	1	1	0	2	9	1	4	1	0	1	8	0	0	0	0	24	137
Total polled		3,113	2,263	513	735	1,234	607	13,482	834	1,255	1,625	698	618	5,868	1,715	3,648	2,602	1,230	1,689	1,502	1,902	1,088	520	881	39,234	93,658
Registered electors		4,303	2,934	686	949	1,754	844	18,218	1,142	1,784	2,254	986	780	8,299	2,327	5,054	3,691	1,654	2,247	2,145	2,529	1,435	689	1,171	50,737	124,791
Turnout		72.34%	77.13%	74.78%	77.45%	70.35%	71.92%	74.00%	73.03%	70.35%	72.09%	70.79%	79.23%	70.71%	73.70%	72.18%	70.49%	74.37%	75.17%	70.02%	75.21%	75.82%	75.47%	75.23%	77.33%	75.05%

==== 2000s ====
===== 2009 =====
Results of the 2009 parliamentary election held on 13 and 14 September 2009:

Party		Votes	%	Seats		
Party		Votes	%	Con.	Com.	Tot.
Labour Party	Ap	30,942	36.74%	3	0	3
Progress Party	FrP	21,224	25.20%	2	0	2
Conservative Party	H	10,846	12.88%	1	0	1
Centre Party	Sp	7,015	8.33%	0	1	1
Socialist Left Party	SV	6,275	7.45%	0	0	0
Christian Democratic Party	KrF	3,042	3.61%	0	0	0
Liberal Party	V	2,150	2.55%	0	0	0
Red Party	R	1,242	1.47%	0	0	0
Coastal Party	KP	954	1.13%	0	0	0
Green Party	MDG	255	0.30%	0	0	0
Christian Unity Party	KSP	152	0.18%	0	0	0
Communist Party of Norway	NKP	70	0.08%	0	0	0
Democrats in Norway		49	0.06%	0	0	0
Valid votes		84,216	100.00%	6	1	7
Total polled		84,216	72.81%			
Registered electors		115,670				

The following candidates were elected: Per-Willy Amundsen (FrP); Bendiks H. Arnesen (Ap); Elisabeth Vik Aspaker (H); Anne Marit Bjørnflaten (Ap); Tove Karoline Knutsen (Ap); Øyvind Korsberg (FrP); and Irene Lange Nordahl (Sp).

Votes by municipality
Party		Votes per municipality																									Total Votes
Party		Bals.	Bar.	Berg	Bjar.	Dyr.	Gáivu.	Great.	Hars.	Ibe.	Karl.	Kvæf.	Kvæn.	Lava.	Lenv.	Lyn.	Måls.	Nord.	Sala.	Skån.	Skje.	Sørr.	Stor.	Tors.	Tran.	Trom.	Total Votes
Labour Party	Ap	1,083	863	215	91	242	519	278	4,838	323	468	509	241	261	1,869	640	1,286	915	447	660	431	691	399	250	357	13,066	30,942
Progress Party	FrP	860	501	139	65	177	265	151	3,658	218	356	434	192	121	1,846	437	836	680	252	448	388	479	252	120	227	8,122	21,224
Conservative Party	H	255	279	68	27	47	66	58	1,912	114	65	152	59	62	725	209	404	272	99	233	128	191	80	52	76	5,213	10,846
Centre Party	Sp	520	373	55	59	130	146	95	623	80	142	201	53	104	499	179	523	247	277	105	126	282	113	75	126	1,882	7,015
Socialist Left Party	SV	141	89	29	19	32	63	42	769	29	92	142	30	13	232	73	180	178	79	93	100	70	63	12	61	3,644	6,275
Christian Democratic Party	KrF	104	33	16	14	37	108	26	314	33	34	40	45	33	305	114	59	144	41	46	113	60	36	25	30	1,232	3,042
Liberal Party	V	36	53	12	2	5	12	8	249	18	20	58	5	3	135	18	163	35	11	37	16	25	13	2	34	1,180	2,150
Red Party	R	21	8	4	5	4	21	2	130	2	8	26	7	0	29	13	14	12	11	12	9	10	7	0	6	881	1,242
Coastal Party	KP	32	5	10	6	6	33	6	73	8	51	17	85	1	57	23	12	36	4	10	150	9	11	25	6	278	954
Green Party	MDG	5	7	1	2	0	15	2	30	0	4	7	3	1	7	8	6	7	2	2	2	1	1	0	1	141	255
Christian Unity Party	KSP	14	4	0	1	3	11	3	13	2	0	0	1	2	10	3	2	11	2	0	9	2	1	1	1	56	152
Communist Party of Norway	NKP	2	1	1	0	1	3	1	7	0	1	2	0	1	9	2	2	1	1	1	0	0	3	1	6	24	70
Democrats in Norway		1	1	0	0	0	0	0	6	0	1	0	1	0	3	0	1	0	1	0	0	3	1	0	0	30	49
Valid votes		3,074	2,217	550	291	684	1,262	672	12,622	827	1,242	1,588	722	602	5,726	1,719	3,488	2,538	1,227	1,647	1,472	1,823	980	563	931	35,749	84,216
Registered electors		4,232	2,925	731	380	958	1,738	877	17,518	1,149	1,836	2,233	1,032	789	8,248	2,393	4,971	3,628	1,652	2,266	2,146	2,497	1,393	729	1,183	48,166	115,670
Turnout		72.64%	75.79%	75.24%	76.58%	71.40%	72.61%	76.62%	72.05%	71.98%	67.65%	71.12%	69.96%	76.30%	69.42%	71.83%	70.17%	69.96%	74.27%	72.68%	68.59%	73.01%	70.35%	77.23%	78.70%	74.22%	72.81%

==== 2005 ====
Results of the 2005 parliamentary election held on 11–12 September 2005:

Party		Votes	%	Seats		
Party		Votes	%	Con.	Com.	Tot.
Labour Party	Ap	27,757	33.01%	3	0	3
Progress Party	FrP	19,236	22.88%	2	0	2
Socialist Left Party	SV	8,109	9.64%	1	0	1
Conservative Party	H	7,548	8.98%	0	1	1
Coastal Party	KP	7,218	8.58%	0	0	0
Centre Party	Sp	6,456	7.68%	0	0	0
Christian Democratic Party	KrF	3,757	4.47%	0	0	0
Liberal Party	V	2,634	3.13%	0	0	0
Red Electoral Alliance	RV	981	1.17%	0	0	0
Christian Unity Party	KSP	152	0.18%	0	0	0
Green Party	MDG	124	0.15%	0	0	0
Communist Party of Norway	K	78	0.09%	0	0	0
Democrats in Norway		38	0.05%	0	0	0
Valid votes		84,088	100.00%	6	1	7
Total polled		84,088	73.74%			
Registered electors		114,029				

The following candidates were elected: Per-Willy Amundsen (FrP); Bendiks H. Arnesen (Ap); Elisabeth Vik Aspaker (H); Anne Marit Bjørnflaten (Ap); Lena Jensen (SV); Tove Karoline Knutsen (Ap); and Øyvind Korsberg (FrP).

==== 2001 ====
Results of the 2001 parliamentary election held on 9–10 September 2001:

Party		Votes	%	Seats		
Party		Votes	%	Con.	Com.	Tot.
Labour Party	Ap	18,008	22.15%	2	0	2
Conservative Party	H	12,739	15.67%	1	0	1
Socialist Left Party	SV	12,007	14.77%	1	0	1
Progress Party	FrP	11,442	14.07%	1	0	1
Christian Democratic Party	KrF	9,925	12.21%	1	0	1
Coastal Party	KP	8,124	9.99%	0	0	0
Centre Party	Sp	5,266	6.48%	0	0	0
Liberal Party	V	1,915	2.36%	0	0	0
Red Electoral Alliance	RV	656	0.81%	0	0	0
The Political Party	DPP	491	0.60%	0	0	0
Christian Unity Party	KSP	339	0.42%	0	0	0
Green Party	MDG	117	0.14%	0	0	0
Communist Party of Norway	K	101	0.12%	0	0	0
County Lists		70	0.09%	0	0	0
Norwegian People's Party	NFP	48	0.06%	0	0	0
Fatherland Party	FLP	35	0.04%	0	0	0
Liberal People's Party	DLF	23	0.03%	0	0	0
Valid votes		81,306	100.00%	6	0	6
Total polled		81,306	71.92%			
Registered electors		113,043				

The following candidates were elected: Bendiks H. Arnesen (Ap); Lena Jensen (SV); Synnøve Konglevoll (Ap); Åge Konradsen (H); Øyvind Korsberg (FrP); and Ivar Østberg (KrF).

=== 1990s ===
==== 1997 ====
Results of the 1997 parliamentary election held on 15 September 1997:

Party		Votes	%	Seats		
Party		Votes	%	Con.	Com.	Tot.
Labour Party	Ap	28,670	34.46%	2	0	2
Christian Democratic Party	KrF	12,833	15.43%	1	0	1
Progress Party	FrP	10,578	12.72%	1	0	1
Centre Party	Sp	9,520	11.44%	1	0	1
Conservative Party	H	9,393	11.29%	1	0	1
Socialist Left Party	SV	6,150	7.39%	0	0	0
Liberal Party	V	2,916	3.51%	0	0	0
Red Electoral Alliance	RV	2,608	3.14%	0	0	0
Green Party	MDG	214	0.26%	0	0	0
Fatherland Party	FLP	144	0.17%	0	0	0
Communist Party of Norway	K	97	0.12%	0	0	0
Natural Law Party		63	0.08%	0	0	0
Valid votes		83,186	100.00%	6	0	6
Rejected votes		201	0.18%			
Total polled		83,387	73.27%			
Registered electors		113,803				

The following candidates were elected: Bendiks H. Arnesen (Ap); Synnøve Konglevoll (Ap); Øyvind Korsberg (FrP); Svein Ludvigsen (H); and Tor Nymo (Sp);.

==== 1993 ====
Results of the 1993 parliamentary election held on 12 and 13 September 1993:

Party		Votes	%	Seats		
Party		Votes	%	Con.	Com.	Tot.
Labour Party	Ap	28,826	35.84%	2	0	2
Centre Party	Sp	17,922	22.28%	2	0	2
Conservative Party	H	11,028	13.71%	1	0	1
Socialist Left Party	SV	10,238	12.73%	1	0	1
Christian Democratic Party	KrF	4,964	6.17%	0	0	0
Progress Party	FrP	3,399	4.23%	0	0	0
Liberal Party	V	2,567	3.19%	0	0	0
Red Electoral Alliance	RV	1,068	1.33%	0	0	0
Fatherland Party	FLP	214	0.27%	0	0	0
New Future Coalition Party	SNF	138	0.17%	0	0	0
Common Future		72	0.09%	0	0	0
Valid votes		80,436	100.00%	6	0	6
Rejected votes		291	0.26%			
Total polled		80,727	70.81%			
Registered electors		114,007				

The following candidates were elected: Rolf Ketil Bjørn (SV); William Engseth (Ap); Ranja Hauglid (Ap); Svein Ludvigsen (H); Tor Nymo (Sp); and Rita H. Roaldsen (Sp).

=== 1980s ===
==== 1989 ====
Results of the 1989 parliamentary election held on 10 and 11 September 1989:

Party		Votes	%	Seats		
Party		Votes	%	Con.	Com.	Tot.
Labour Party	Ap	32,481	37.63%	3	0	3
Conservative Party	H	18,104	20.97%	1	0	1
Socialist Left Party	SV	11,955	13.85%	1	0	1
Progress Party	FrP	9,832	11.39%	1	0	1
Christian Democratic Party	KrF	6,197	7.18%	0	0	0
Centre Party	Sp	3,747	4.34%	0	0	0
Liberal Party	V	2,396	2.78%	0	0	0
County Lists for Environment and Solidarity	FMS	704	0.82%	0	0	0
Pensioners' Party	PP	341	0.40%	0	0	0
Green Party	MDG	300	0.35%	0	0	0
Stop Immigration	SI	261	0.30%	0	0	0
Valid votes		86,318	100.00%	6	0	6
Rejected votes		261	0.23%			
Total polled		86,579	77.79%			
Registered electors		111,295				

The following candidates were elected: Rolf Ketil Bjørn (SV); Jan Elvheim (Ap); William Engseth (Ap); Ranja Hauglid (Ap); Svein Ludvigsen (H); and Terje Nyberget (FrP).

==== 1985 ====
Results of the 1985 parliamentary election held on 8 and 9 September 1985:

Party		Party			List Alliance		
Party		Votes	%	Seats	Votes	%	Seats
Labour Party	Ap	40,730	47.72%	4	40,730	47.72%	3
Conservative Party	H	23,204	27.19%	2	23,204	27.19%	2
Christian Democratic Party	KrF	5,946	6.97%	0	9,657	6.97%	1
Centre Party	Sp	4,297	5.03%	0	9,657	6.97%	1
Socialist Left Party	SV	5,667	6.64%	0	5,667	6.64%	0
Liberal Party	V	2,125	2.49%	0	2,125	2.49%	0
Progress Party	FrP	2,039	2.39%	0	2,039	2.39%	0
Red Electoral Alliance	RV	867	1.02%	0	867	1.02%	0
Pensioners' Party	PP	168	0.20%	0	168	0.20%	0
Communist Party of Norway	K	166	0.19%	0	166	0.19%	0
Liberal People's Party	DLF	125	0.15%	0	125	0.15%	0
County Lists		16	0.02%	0	16	0.02%	
Valid votes		85,350	100.00%	6	84,764	100.00%	6
Rejected votes		84	0.08%				
Total polled		85,434	78.74%				
Registered electors		108,504					

As the list alliances were entitled to more seats contesting as alliances than they were contesting as individual parties, the distribution of seats was as list alliance votes. The KrF-Sp list alliance's additional seat was allocated to the Christian Democratic Party.

The following candidates were elected: Per Almar Aas (KrF); Margit Hansen-Krone (H); Ranja Hauglid (Ap); Rolf Nilssen (Ap); Arnljot Norwich (H); and Asbjørn Sjøthun (Ap).

==== 1981 ====
Results of the 1981 parliamentary election held on 13 and 14 September 1981:

Party		Votes	%	Seats
Labour Party	Ap	32,831	40.32%	3
Conservative Party	H	24,783	30.44%	2
Christian Democratic Party	KrF	6,946	8.53%	1
Centre Party	Sp	5,040	6.19%	0
Socialist Left Party	SV	4,490	5.51%	0
Liberal Party	V	2,966	3.64%	0
Progress Party	FrP	2,471	3.03%	0
Red Electoral Alliance	RV	1,368	1.68%	0
Communist Party of Norway	K	252	0.31%	0
Liberal People's Party	DLF	207	0.25%	0
Plebiscite Party		40	0.05%	0
Freely Elected Representatives		23	0.03%	0
Valid votes		81,417	100.00%	6
Rejected votes		95	0.09%	
Total polled		81,512	77.62%	
Registered electors		105,009		

The following candidates were elected: Per Almar Aas (KrF); Margit Hansen-Krone (H); Ranja Hauglid (Ap); Rolf Nilssen (Ap); Arnljot Norwich (H); and Asbjørn Sjøthun (Ap).

=== 1970s ===
==== 1977 ====
Results of the 1977 parliamentary election held on 11 and 12 September 1977:

Party		Votes	%	Seats
Labour Party	Ap	32,292	44.58%	3
Conservative Party	H	16,070	22.18%	2
Christian Democratic Party	KrF	9,230	12.74%	1
Centre Party	Sp	6,022	8.31%	0
Socialist Left Party	SV	3,462	4.78%	0
Liberal Party	V	2,148	2.97%	0
Progress Party	FrP	1,241	1.71%	0
Red Electoral Alliance	RV	798	1.10%	0
New People's Party	DNF	692	0.96%	0
Communist Party of Norway	K	362	0.50%	0
Single Person's Party		78	0.11%	0
Norwegian Democratic Party		30	0.04%	0
Free Elected Representatives		18	0.02%	0
Valid votes		72,443	100.00%	6
Rejected votes		114	0.12%	
Total polled		72,557	76.20%	
Registered electors		95,220		

The following candidates were elected: Per Almar Aas (KrF); Margit Hansen-Krone (H); Kirsten Myklevoll (Ap); Rolf Nilssen (Ap); Arnljot Norwich (H); and Asbjørn Sjøthun (Ap).

==== 1973 ====
Results of the 1973 parliamentary election held on 9 and 10 September 1973:

Party		Votes	%	Seats
Labour Party	Ap	23,422	36.33%	2
Liberal Party and Centre Party	V-Sp	12,245	14.12%	1
Conservative Party	H	8,789	13.63%	1
Socialist Electoral League	SV	8,728	13.54%	1
Christian Democratic Party	KrF	6,768	10.50%	1
Anders Lange's Party	ALP	2,921	4.53%	0
New People's Party	DNF	1,009	1.57%	0
Red Electoral Alliance	RV	370	0.57%	0
Single Person's Party		97	0.15%	0
Norwegian Democratic Party		60	0.09%	0
Kvinnenes frie folkevalgte		54	0.08%	0
Valid votes		64,463	100.00%	6
Rejected votes		62	0.07%	
Total polled		64,525	70.72%	
Registered electors		91,245		

The following candidates were elected: Per Almar Aas (KrF); Ottar Brox (SV); Martin Buvik (H); Johannes Gilleberg (Sp); Kirsten Myklevoll (Ap); and Asbjørn Sjøthun (Ap).

=== 1960s ===
==== 1969 ====
Results of the 1969 parliamentary election held on 7 and 8 September 1969:

Party		Votes	%	Seats
Labour Party	Ap	36,549	55.45%	3
Conservative Party	H	9,592	14.55%	1
Centre Party–Christian Democratic Party	Sp-KrF	9,364	14.21%	1
Liberal Party	V	7,483	11.35%	1
Socialist People's Party	SF	2,437	3.70%	0
Communist Party of Norway	K	490	0.74%	0
Valid votes		65,915	100.00%	6
Rejected votes		91	0.11%	
Total polled		66,006	76.71%	
Registered electors		86,051		

The following candidates were elected: Martin Buvik (H); Johannes Gilleberg (Sp); Alfred Meyer Henningsen (Ap); Nils Kristen Jacobsen (Ap); Helge Jakobsen (V); and Asbjørn Sjøthun (Ap).

==== 1965 ====
Results of the 1965 parliamentary election held on 12 and 13 September 1965:

Party		Votes	%	Seats
Labour Party	Ap	28,861	48.55%	3
Conservative Party	H	10,783	18.14%	1
Centre Party	Sp	8,054	13.55%	1
Liberal Party	V	7,884	13.26%	1
Socialist People's Party	SF	3,147	5.29%	0
Communist Party of Norway	K	719	1.21%	0
Valid votes		59,448	100.00%	6
Rejected votes		551	0.69%	
Total polled		59,999	74.64%	
Registered electors		80,388		

The following candidates were elected: Martin Buvik (H); Johannes Gilleberg (Sp); Kåre Martin Hansen (Ap); Alfred Meyer Henningsen (Ap); Nils Kristen Jacobsen (Ap); and Helge Jakobsen (V).

==== 1961 ====
Results of the 1961 parliamentary election held on 11 September 1961:

Party		Votes	%	Seats
Labour Party	Ap	27,550	54.37%	4
Conservative Party	H	8,045	15.88%	1
Liberal Party	V	6,012	11.87%	1
Centre Party	Sp	4,034	7.96%	0
Christian Democratic Party	KrF	3,650	7.20%	0
Communist Party of Norway	K	1,373	2.71%	0
Wild Votes		6	0.01%	0
Valid votes		50,670	100.00%	6
Rejected votes		535	0.70%	
Total polled		51,205	66.60%	
Registered electors		76,882		

The following candidates were elected: Kåre Martin Hansen (Ap); Alfred Meyer Henningsen (Ap); Nils Kristen Jacobsen (Ap); Helge Jakobsen (V); Frithjov Meier Vik (H); and Einar Wøhni (Ap).

=== 1950s ===
==== 1957 ====
Results of the 1957 parliamentary election held on 7 October 1957:

Party		Votes	%	Seats
Labour Party	Ap	27,470	54.84%	4
Conservative Party	H	6,902	13.78%	1
Liberal Party	V	5,971	11.92%	1
Christian Democratic Party	KrF	4,258	8.50%	0
Farmers' Party	Bp	3,584	7.15%	0
Communist Party of Norway	K	1,564	3.12%	0
Norwegian Social Democratic Party		346	0.69%	0
Valid votes		50,095	100.00%	6
Rejected votes		449	0.59%	
Total polled		50,544	66.83%	
Registered electors		75,635		

The following candidates were elected: Nils Kristen Jacobsen (Ap); Peder Nikolai Jacobsen (Ap); Ingvald Johannes Jaklin (Ap); Bjarne Daniel Solli (Ap); Hans Nikolai Stavrand (V); and Frithjov Meier Vik (H).

==== 1953 ====
Results of the 1953 parliamentary election held on 12 October 1953:

Party		Votes	%	Seats
Labour Party	Ap	27,559	55.13%	4
Liberal Party	V	8,408	16.82%	1
Conservative Party	H	6,280	12.56%	1
Christian Democratic Party	KrF	4,842	9.69%	0
Communist Party of Norway	K	2,898	5.80%	0
Wild Votes		1	0.00%	0
Valid votes		49,988	100.00%	6
Rejected votes		201	0.27%	
Total polled		50,417	67.64%	
Registered electors		74,537		

The following candidates were elected: Nils Kristen Jacobsen (Ap); Peder Nikolai Jacobsen (Ap); Ingvald Johannes Jaklin (Ap); Bjarne Daniel Solli (Ap); Hans Nikolai Stavrand (V); and Frithjov Meier Vik (H).

=== 1940s ===
==== 1949 ====
Results of the 1949 parliamentary election held on 10 October 1949:

Party		Votes	%	Seats
Labour Party	Ap	24,758	57.97%	4
Liberal Party	V	6,622	15.50%	1
Conservative Party	H	5,216	12.21%	0
Christian Democratic Party	KrF	2,864	6.71%	0
Communist Party of Norway	K	2,215	5.19%	0
Society Party	Samfp	1,035	2.42%	0
Valid votes		42,710	100.00%	5
Rejected votes		535	0.83%	
Total polled		43,245	67.02%	
Registered electors		64,526		

The following candidates were elected: Håkon Martin Breivoll (Ap); Aldor Ingebrigtsen (Ap); Nils Kristen Jacobsen (Ap); Peder Nikolai Jacobsen (Ap); and Hans Nikolai Stavrand (V).

==== 1945 ====
Results of the 1945 parliamentary election held on 8 October 1945:

Party		Votes	%	Seats
Labour Party	Ap	18,407	57.52%	4
Liberal Party	V	5,475	17.11%	1
Communist Party of Norway	K	4,195	13.11%	0
Conservative Party	H	3,921	12.25%	0
Wild Votes		1	0.00%	0
Valid votes		31,999	100.00%	5
Rejected votes		487	0.85%	
Total polled		32,486	56.97%	
Registered electors		57,023		

The following candidates were elected: Håkon Martin Breivoll (Ap); Hans Eidnes (V); Aldor Ingebrigtsen (Ap); Nils Kristen Jacobsen (Ap); and Søren Berg Sørensen Moen (Ap).

=== 1930s ===
==== 1936 ====
Results of the 1936 parliamentary election held on 19 October 1936:

Party		Party			List Alliance		
Party		Votes	%	Seats	Votes	%	Seats
Labour Party	Ap	20,047	52.85%	4	20,047	52.87%	3
Liberal Party	V	6,664	17.57%	1	6,664	17.57%	1
Civic Assembly Party (Conservative Party)	BS	4,547	11.99%	0	6,564	17.31%	1
Farmers' Party	Bp	2,017	5.32%	0	6,564	17.31%	1
Society Party	Samfp	4,514	11.90%	0	4,514	11.91%	0
Nasjonal Samling	NS	134	0.35%	0	134	0.35%	0
Wild Votes		6	0.02%	0	6	0.02%	0
Valid votes		37,929	100.00%	5	37,916	100.00%	5
Rejected votes		328	0.66%				
Total polled		38,257	77.35%				
Registered electors		49,457					

As the list alliance was entitled to more seats contesting as an alliance than it was contesting as individual parties, the distribution of seats was as list alliance votes. The BS-Bp list alliance's additional seat was allocated to the Civic Assembly Party (Conservative Party).

The following candidates were elected: Harry Alvær (V); Meyer Foshaug (Ap); Aldor Ingebrigtsen (Ap); Alfons Johansen (Ap); and Mikal Laberg (V); (BS).

==== 1933 ====
Results of the 1933 parliamentary election held on 16 October 1933:

Party		Party			List Alliance		
Party		Votes	%	Seats	Votes	%	Seats
Labour Party	Ap	17,593	54.61%	4	17,593	54.65%	3
Liberal Party	V	7,150	22.20%	1	7,150	22.21%	1
Civic Assembly Party in Troms (Conservative Party)	BS	3,320	10.31%	0	5,781	17.96%	1
Farmers' Party	Bp	2,479	7.70%	0	5,781	17.96%	1
Society Party	Samfp	1,234	3.83%	0	1,234	3.83%	0
Communist Party of Norway	K	435	1.35%	0	435	1.35%	0
Wild Votes		2	0.01%	0	2	0.01%	0
Valid votes		32,213	100.00%	5	32,195	100.00%	5
Rejected votes		305	0.65%				
Total polled		32,518	69.24%				
Registered electors		46,961					

As the list alliance was entitled to more seats contesting as an alliance than it was contesting as individual parties, the distribution of seats was as list alliance votes. The BS-Bp list alliance's additional seat was allocated to the Civic Assembly Party.

The following candidates were elected: Meyer Foshaug (Ap); Aldor Ingebrigtsen (Ap); Alfons Johan Johansen (Ap); Anton Karl Hagbart Jakobsen (V); and Mikal Laberg (V).

==== 1930 ====
Results of the 1930 parliamentary election held on 20 October 1930:

Party		Party			List Alliance		
Party		Votes	%	Seats	Votes	%	Seats
Labour Party	Ap	12,032	40.56%	2	12,032	40.59%	2
Civic Assembly Party (Conservative Party)	BS	5,519	18.60%	1	8,896	30.01%	2
Farmers' Party	Bp	3,398	11.45%	0	8,896	30.01%	2
Liberal Party	V	8,472	28.56%	2	8,472	28.58%	1
Communist Party of Norway	K	244	0.82%	0	244	0.82%	0
Wild Votes		1	0.00%	0	1	0.01%	0
Valid votes		29,666	100.00%	5	29,645	100.00%	5
Rejected votes		335	0.76%				
Total polled		30,001	68.15%				
Registered electors		44,019					

As the list alliance was entitled to more seats contesting as an alliance than it was contesting as individual parties, the distribution of seats was as list alliance votes. The BS-Bp list alliance's additional seat was allocated to the Farmers' Party.

The following candidates were elected: Lorents Vilhelm Dass Hansen (V); Aldor Ingebrigtsen (Ap); Mikal Schjelderup Pedersen Laberg (BS); Matias Johan Torheim (Bp); and Kristian Pedersen Tønder (Ap).

=== 1920s ===
==== 1927 ====
Results of the 1927 parliamentary election held on 17 October 1927:

Party		Votes	%	Seats
Labour Party	Ap	12,367	53.10%	4
Liberal Party	V	5,143	22.08%	1
Conservative Party and Free-minded Liberal Party	H-FV	4,756	12.82%	0
Farmers' Party	Bp	1,739	7.47%	0
Communist Party of Norway	K	1,054	4.53%	0
Valid votes		23,289	100.00%	5
Rejected votes		629	1.48%	
Total polled		23,918	56.43%	
Registered electors		42,384		

The following candidates were elected: Meyer Foshaug (Ap); Lorents Vilhelm Dass Hansen (V); Aldor Ingebrigtsen (Ap); Alfons Johan Johansen (Ap); and Kristian Pedersen Tønder (Ap).

==== 1924 ====
Results of the 1924 parliamentary election held on 21 October 1924:

Party		Votes	%	Seats
Labour Party	Ap	6,564	28.87%	2
Liberal Party	V	5,406	23.78%	2
Conservative Party and Free-minded Liberal Party	H-FV	4,756	20.92%	1
Social Democratic Labour Party of Norway	S	2,522	11.09%	0
Farmers' Party	Bp	1,844	8.11%	0
Communist Party of Norway	K	846	3.72%	0
Det gammelkirkelige parti		795	3.50%	0
Wild Votes		3	0.01%	0
Valid votes		22,736	100.00%	5
Rejected votes		639	1.58%	
Total polled		23,375	57.92%	
Registered electors		40,354		

The following candidates were elected: Ola Krogseng Giæver (H-FV); Lorents Vilhelm Dass Hansen (V); Aldor Ingebrigtsen (Ap); Anton Karl Hagbart Jakobsen (V); and Kristian Pedersen Tønder (Ap).

==== 1921 ====
Results of the 1921 parliamentary election held on 24 October 1921:

Party		Votes	%	Seats
Labour Party	Ap	7,330	33.80%	2
Conservative Party and Free-minded Liberal Party	H-FV	4,836	22.30%	1
Liberal Party	V	4,672	21.54%	1
Social Democratic Labour Party of Norway	S	2,788	12.86%	1
Norwegian Farmers' Association	L	2,022	9.32%	0
Wild Votes		37	0.17%	0
Valid votes		21,685	100.00%	5
Rejected votes		722	1.88%	
Total polled		22,407	58.42%	
Registered electors		38,356		

The following candidates were elected: Meyer Foshaug (S); Lorents Vilhelm Dass Hansen (V); Kristian Fredrik Holst (H-FV); Aldor Ingebrigtsen (Ap); and Kristian Pedersen Tønder (Ap).
