= List of members of the Storting, 2005–2009 =

Distribution of mandates after the 2005 election Socialist Left Party (15) Labour Party (61) Centre Party (11) Christian Democratic Party (11) Liberal Party (10) Conservative Party (23) Progress Party (38)

The list includes all those initially elected to the Storting. Between 19 October 2005 and 30 September 2009, the Parliament of Norway consisted of 169 members from 7 parties and 19 constituencies, elected during the 2005 Norwegian parliamentary election on 11 and 12 September. The Red-Green Coalition, consisting of the Labour Party (61 members), the Socialist Left Party (15 members) and the Centre Party (11 members) gained a majority and created Stoltenberg's Second Cabinet. The majority cabinet lasted the entire session and was reelected in the 2009 election. The opposition consisted of four parties: the Progress Party (38 members), the Conservative Party (23 members), the Christian Democratic Party (11 members) and the Liberal Party (10 members).

Members of the Parliament of Norway are elected based on party-list proportional representation in plural member constituencies. This means that representatives from different political parties are elected from 19 constituencies, which are identical to the 19 counties. The electorate does not vote for individuals but rather for party lists, with a ranked list of candidates nominated by the party. This means that the person on top of the list will get the seat unless the voter alters the ballot. Parties may nominate candidates from outside their own constituency, and even Norwegian citizens currently living abroad.

The Sainte-Laguë method is used for allocating parliamentary seats to parties. As a result, the percentage of representatives is roughly equal to the nationwide percentage of votes. Still, a party with a high number of votes in only one constituency can win a seat there even if the nationwide percentage is low. This has happened several times in Norwegian history. Conversely, if a party's initial representation in Parliament is proportionally less than its share of votes, the party may seat more representatives through leveling seats, provided that the nationwide percentage is above the election threshold, at 4 percent. In 2005, nineteen seats were allocated via the leveling system.

If a representative is absent for whatever reason, his or her seat will be filled by a candidate from the same party-list—in other words, there are no by-elections. Representatives who die during the term are replaced permanently, whereas representatives who are appointed to a government position, such as government minister (cabinet member) or state secretary, will be replaced by a deputy representative until the representative no longer holds the government position. Deputy representatives also meet during typically short-term absence, like when a representative travels abroad with a parliamentary work group or is absent for health reasons.

== By county and party ==
The following is a breakdown of the intersection of parties and constituencies.

Constituency	Soc. Left	Labour	Centre	Chr. Dem.	Liberal	Cons.	Progress	Total
Aust-Agder	0	1	0	1	0	1	1	4
Vest-Agder	0	1	0	1	1	1	2	6
Akershus	1	5	1	0	1	4	4	16
Buskerud	1	4	1	0	0	1	2	9
Finnmark	1	2	0	0	1	0	1	5
Hedmark	1	4	1	0	0	1	1	8
Hordaland	1	4	1	2	1	3	3	15
Møre og Romsdal	1	2	1	1	1	1	2	9
Nordland	1	4	1	1	0	1	2	10
Oppland	0	4	1	0	0	1	1	7
Oslo	2	6	0	1	2	3	3	17
Rogaland	1	3	1	2	1	2	3	13
Sogn og Fjordane	0	2	1	0	1	0	1	5
Telemark	0	3	0	0	0	1	2	6
Troms	1	3	0	0	0	1	2	7
Nord-Trøndelag	1	2	1	0	1	0	1	6
Sør-Trøndelag	1	4	1	1	0	1	2	10
Vestfold	1	3	0	0	0	1	2	7
Østfold	1	3	0	0	1	1	3	9
Total	15	61	11	11	10	23	38	169

== Representatives ==
The following is a list of members elected to the parliament in the 2005 election. It consists of the representative's name, party, constituency and standing committee membership, in addition to noting members assigned to government and deceased, with their regular deputy, chair and deputy chairs of standing committees, parliamentary leaders of the parties and representatives elected through a leveling seat.

Name	Party	Constituency	Standing committee	Comments	Refs
Freddy de Ruiter	Labour	Aust-Agder	Education, Research and Church Affairs		
Torbjørn Andersen	Progress	Aust-Agder	Energy and the Environment		
Inger Løite	Labour	Aust-Agder	Local Government and Public Administration		
Åse Gunhild Woie Duesund	Christian Democratic	Aust-Agder	Labour and Social Affairs	Leveling seat	
Henning Skumsvoll	Progress	Vest-Agder	Defence		
Rolf Terje Klungland	Labour	Vest-Agder	Finance and Economic Affairs		
Jon Lilletun	Christian Democratic	Vest-Agder	Foreign Affairs	Died 21 August 2006. Dagrun Eriksen (Education, Research and Church Affairs) met in his place.	
Peter Skovholt Gitmark	Conservative	Vest-Agder	Finance and Economic Affairs; Energy and the Environment		
Åse Michaelsen	Progress	Vest-Agder	Education, Research and Church Affairs		
Anne Margrethe Larsen	Liberal	Vest-Agder	Foreign Affairs	Leveling seat	
Anniken Huitfeldt	Labour	Akershus	Education, Research and Church Affairs	Committee first deputy chair. Appointed to Stoltenberg's Second Cabinet in February 2008. Gorm Kjernli (Education, Research and Church Affairs) met in her place.	
Morten Høglund	Progress	Akershus	Foreign Affairs		
Jan Petersen	Conservative	Akershus	Defence	Committee chair	
Sverre Myrli	Labour	Akershus	Labour and Social Affairs		
Hans Frode Asmyhr	Progress	Akershus	Business and Industry		
Jan Tore Sanner	Conservative	Akershus	Finance and Economic Affairs		
Vidar Bjørnstad	Labour	Akershus	Foreign Affairs		
Rolf Reikvam	Socialist Left	Akershus	Education, Research and Church Affairs; Local Government and Public Administration		
Borghild Tenden	Liberal	Akershus	Transport and Communications	Committee first deputy chair	
Kari Kjønaas Kjos	Progress	Akershus	Labour and Social Affairs		
Gunvor Eldegard	Labour	Akershus	Business and Industry	Committee first deputy chair	
Sonja Irene Sjøli	Conservative	Akershus	Health and Care Services		
Marianne Aasen Agdestein	Labour	Akershus	Finance and Economic Affairs		
Ib Thomsen	Progress	Akershus	Local Government and Public Administration		
André Oktay Dahl	Conservative	Akershus	Justice		
Åslaug Haga	Centre Party	Akershus	Foreign Affairs	Leveling seat. Appointed to Stoltenberg's Second Cabinet until June 2008, during which period Dagfinn Sundsbø (Labour and Social Affairs) met in her place.	
Thorbjørn Jagland	Labour	Buskerud	Defence		
Ulf Erik Knudsen	Progress	Buskerud	Family and Cultural Affairs		
Sigrun Eng	Labour	Buskerud	Business and Industry		
Trond Helleland	Conservative	Buskerud	Transport and Communications		
Jørund Rytman	Progress	Buskerud	Finance and Economic Affairs		
Lise Christoffersen	Labour	Buskerud	Labour and Social Affairs	Committee second deputy chair	
Magnar Lund Bergo	Socialist Left	Buskerud	Finance and Economic Affairs		
Torgeir Micaelsen	Labour	Buskerud	Finance and Economic Affairs		
Per Olaf Lundteigen	Centre Party	Buskerud	Finance and Economic Affairs	Leveling seat	
Karl Eirik Schjøtt-Pedersen	Labour	Finnmark	Finance and Economic Affairs	Committee chair until appointed to the Prime Minister's office in December 2006. Alf E. Jakobsen (Finance and Economic Affairs) met in his place.	
Eva M. Nielsen	Labour	Finnmark	Energy and the Environment		
Jan-Henrik Fredriksen	Progress	Finnmark	Health and Care Services		
Olav Gunnar Ballo	Socialist Left	Finnmark	Justice; Health and Care Services	Second deputy chair of the Standing Committee on Justice until 24 October 2007.	
Vera Lysklætt	Liberal	Finnmark	Local Government and Public Administration	Leveling seat	
Sylvia Brustad	Labour	Hedmark	—	Appointed to Stoltenberg's Second Cabinet. Ivar Skulstad (Scrutiny and Constitutional Affairs) met in her place.	
Knut Storberget	Labour	Hedmark	—	Appointed to Stoltenberg's Second Cabinet. Thomas Breen (Justice) met in his place.	
Per Roar Bredvold	Progress	Hedmark	Defence		
Anette Trettebergstuen	Labour	Hedmark	Foreign Affairs		
Trygve Slagsvold Vedum	Centre Party	Hedmark	Local Government and Public Administration; Health and Care Services	Standing Committee on Health and Care Services first deputy chair from 7 October 2008	
Eirin Faldet	Labour	Hedmark	Transport and Communications		
Karin Andersen	Socialist Left	Hedmark	Labour and Social Affairs	Committee chair	
Gunnar Gundersen	Conservative	Hedmark	Education, Research and Church Affairs	Leveling seat	
Olav Akselsen	Labour	Hordaland	Foreign Affairs	Committee chair	
Arne Sortevik	Progress	Hordaland	Transport and Communications		
Erna Solberg	Conservative	Hordaland	Foreign Affairs	Parliamentary leader; committee first deputy chair	
Anne-Grete Strøm-Erichsen	Labour	Hordaland	—	Appointed to Stoltenberg's Second Cabinet. Dag Ole Teigen (Health and Care Services) met in her place.	
Gjermund Hagesæter	Progress	Hordaland	Finance and Economic Affairs		
Ingebrigt S. Sørfonn	Christian Democratic	Hordaland	Business and Industry		
Per Rune Henriksen	Labour	Hordaland	Labour and Social Affairs		
Øyvind Halleraker	Conservative	Hordaland	Transport and Communications		
Ågot Valle	Socialist Left	Hordaland	Foreign Affairs		
Lars Sponheim	Liberal	Hordaland	Finance and Economic Affairs	Parliamentary leader	
Karin S. Woldseth	Progress	Hordaland	Family and Cultural Affairs		
Hilde Magnusson Lydvo	Labour	Hordaland	Justice		
Rune J. Skjælaaen	Centre Party	Hordaland	Health and Care Services; Scrutiny and Constitutional Affairs	Parliamentary leader from 20 June 2008; standing Committee on Health and Care Services first deputy chair until 22 September 2008	
Torbjørn Hansen	Conservative	Hordaland	Business and Industry		
Laila Dåvøy	Christian Democratic	Hordaland	Health and Care Services	Leveling seat	
Harald T. Nesvik	Progress	Møre og Romsdal	Health and Care Services	Committee chair	
Asmund Kristoffersen	Labour	Møre og Romsdal	Energy and the Environment		
Petter Løvik	Conservative	Møre og Romsdal	Business and Industry		
Lodve Solholm	Progress	Møre og Romsdal	Scrutiny and Constitutional Affairs	Committee chair	
Karita Bekkemellem	Labour	Møre og Romsdal	Transport and Communications	Appointed to Stoltenberg's Second Cabinet until October 2007, during which period Svein Gjelseth (Transport and Communications) met in her place.	
May-Helen Molvær Grimstad	Christian Democratic	Møre og Romsdal	Family and Cultural Affairs	Committee chair	
Eli Sollied Øveraas	Centre Party	Møre og Romsdal	Transport and Communications		
Leif Helge Kongshaug	Liberal	Møre og Romsdal	Business and Industry		
Bjørn Jacobsen	Socialist Left	Møre og Romsdal	Defence	Leveling seat	
Hill-Marta Solberg	Labour	Nordland	Foreign Affairs	Parliamentary leader	
Kenneth Svendsen	Progress	Nordland	Labour and Social Affairs	Committee first deputy chair	
Tor-Arne Strøm	Labour	Nordland	Transport and Communications		
Åsa Elvik	Socialist Left	Nordland	Local Government and Public Administration; Education, Research and Church Affairs		
Jan Arild Ellingsen	Progress	Nordland	Justice	Committee first deputy chair	
Torny Pedersen	Labour	Nordland	Energy and the Environment		
Alf Ivar Samuelsen	Centre Party	Nordland	Foreign Affairs; Labour and Social Affairs		
Ivar Kristiansen	Conservative	Nordland	Energy and the Environment	Committee first deputy chair from 10 January 2008.	
Anna Ljunggren	Labour	Nordland	Education, Research and Church Affairs		
Jan Sahl	Christian Democratic	Nordland	Transport and Communications	Leveling seat	
Torstein Rudihagen	Labour	Oppland	Transport and Communications	Committee second deputy chair	
Berit Brørby	Labour	Oppland	Scrutiny and Constitutional Affairs		
Thore A. Nistad	Progress	Oppland	Justice		
Inger S. Enger	Centre Party	Oppland	Education, Research and Church Affairs		
Tore Hagebakken	Labour	Oppland	Local Government and Public Administration	Committee chair from 6 October 2006	
Espen Johnsen	Labour	Oppland	Family and Cultural Affairs		
Olemic Thommessen	Conservative	Oppland	Family and Cultural Affairs	Leveling seat	
Jens Stoltenberg	Labour	Oslo	—	Prime Minister in Stoltenberg's Second Cabinet. Truls Wickholm (Transport and Communications) met in his place.	
Per-Kristian Foss	Conservative	Oslo	Scrutiny and Constitutional Affairs		
Carl I. Hagen	Progress	Oslo	Scrutiny and Constitutional Affairs		
Marit Nybakk	Labour	Oslo	Foreign Affairs	Committee second deputy chair	
Kristin Halvorsen	Socialist Left	Oslo	—	Appointed to Stoltenberg's Second Cabinet. Heidi Sørensen (Energy and the Environment) met in her place until October 2007, when Sørensen was appointed State Secretary. Sørensen was replaced by Akhtar Chaudhry (Justice)	
Odd Einar Dørum	Liberal	Oslo	Education, Research and Church Affairs		
Ine Marie Eriksen Søreide	Conservative	Oslo	Education, Research and Church Affairs	Committee chair	
Jan Bøhler	Labour	Oslo	Health and Care Services	Committee second deputy chair	
Siv Jensen	Progress	Oslo	Foreign Affairs	Parliamentary leader	
Britt Hildeng	Labour	Oslo	Family and Cultural Affairs		
Heikki Holmås	Socialist Left	Oslo	Finance and Economic Affairs		
Inge Lønning	Conservative	Oslo	Health and Care Services		
Marianne Marthinsen	Labour	Oslo	Energy and the Environment		
Christian Tybring-Gjedde	Progress	Oslo	Finance and Economic Affairs		
Trine Skei Grande	Liberal	Oslo	Family and Cultural Affairs		
Saera Khan	Labour	Oslo	Local Government and Public Administration		
Hans Olav Syversen	Christian Democratic	Oslo	Finance and Economic Affairs	Leveling seat	
Øyvind Vaksdal	Progress	Rogaland	Foreign Affairs		
Tore Nordtun	Labour	Rogaland	Energy and the Environment	Committee second deputy chair	
Bent Høie	Conservative	Rogaland	Local Government and Public Administration		
Dagfinn Høybråten	Christian Democratic	Rogaland	Scrutiny and Constitutional Affairs; Foreign Affairs	Parliamentary leader	
Solveig Horne	Progress	Rogaland	Justice		
Eirin Kristin Sund	Labour	Rogaland	Finance and Economic Affairs		
Ketil Solvik-Olsen	Progress	Rogaland	Energy and the Environment		
Finn Martin Vallersnes	Conservative	Rogaland	Foreign Affairs		
Gunnar Kvassheim	Liberal	Rogaland	Energy and the Environment	Committee chair	
Torfinn Opheim	Labour	Rogaland	Education, Research and Church Affairs		
Magnhild Meltveit Kleppa	Centre Party	Rogaland	Scrutiny and Constitutional Affairs	Parliamentary leader until 21 September 2007; appointed to Stoltenberg's Second Cabinet in September 2007. Trond Lode (Family and Cultural Affairs) met in her place.	
Hallgeir H. Langeland	Socialist Left	Rogaland	Transport and Communications		
Bjørg Tørresdal	Christian Democratic	Rogaland	Local Government and Public Administration	Leveling seat; committee first deputy chair	
Reidar Sandal	Labour	Sogn og Fjordane	Finance and Economic Affairs	Committee chair from 5 December 2006	
Liv Signe Navarsete	Centre Party	Sogn og Fjordane	—	Appointed to Stoltenberg's Second Cabinet. Erling Sande (Family and Cultural Affairs and Energy and the Environment) met in her place.	
Åge Starheim	Progress	Sogn og Fjordane	Local Government and Public Administration		
Ingrid Heggø	Labour	Sogn og Fjordane	Justice		
Gunvald Ludvigsen	Liberal	Sogn og Fjordane	Health and Care Services	Leveling seat	
Sigvald Oppebøen Hansen	Labour	Telemark	Business and Industry		
Bård Hoksrud	Progress	Telemark	Transport and Communications		
Gunn Olsen	Labour	Telemark	Health and Care Services		
Terje Aasland	Labour	Telemark	Energy and the Environment		
Kåre Fostervold	Progress	Telemark	Business and Industry		
Kari Lise Holmberg	Conservative	Telemark	Local Government and Public Administration	Leveling seat	
Bendiks H. Arnesen	Labour	Troms	Defence		
Øyvind Korsberg	Progress	Troms	Business and Industry	Committee second deputy chair	
Anne Marit Bjørnflaten	Labour	Troms	Justice	Committee chair	
Per-Willy Amundsen	Progress	Troms	Local Government and Public Administration	Committee second deputy chair	
Lena Jensen	Socialist Left	Troms	Education, Research and Church Affairs		
Tove Karoline Knutsen	Labour	Troms	Family and Cultural Affairs		
Elisabeth Aspaker	Conservative	Troms	Justice	Leveling seat	
Bjarne Håkon Hanssen	Labour	Nord-Trøndelag	—	Appointed to Stoltenberg's Second Cabinet. Arild Stokkan-Grande (Local Government and Public Administration) met in his place.	
Gerd Janne Kristoffersen	Labour	Nord-Trøndelag	Education, Research and Church Affairs	Committee first deputy chair from 6 March 2008	
Lars Peder Brekk	Centre Party	Nord-Trøndelag	Business and Industry; Scrutiny and Constitutional Affairs	Parliamentary leader 3 October 2007 – 20 June 2008; standing Committee on Business and Industry chair until 4 October 2007. Appointed to Stoltenberg's Second Cabinet in June 2008. Anna Ceselie Brustad (Local Government and Public Administration) met in his place.	
Robert Eriksson	Progress	Nord-Trøndelag	Labour and Social Affairs		
Inge Ryan	Socialist Left	Nord-Trøndelag	Scrutiny and Constitutional Affairs; Business and Industry	Parliamentary leader; committee first deputy chair until 24 November 2007	
André N. Skjelstad	Liberal	Nord-Trøndelag	Labour and Social Affairs	Leveling seat	
Trond Giske	Labour	Sør-Trøndelag	—	Appointed to Stoltenberg's Second Cabinet. Arne L. Haugen (Business and Industry) met in his place.	
Gunn Karin Gjul	Labour	Sør-Trøndelag	Family and Cultural Affairs		
Per Sandberg	Progress	Sør-Trøndelag	Transport and Communications	Committee chair	
Børge Brende	Conservative	Sør-Trøndelag	Energy and the Environment	Committee first deputy chair. Appointed managing director in World Economic Forum from 2008. Linda Cathrine Hofstad Helleland met in his place.	
Øystein Djupedal	Socialist Left	Sør-Trøndelag	Scrutiny and Constitutional Affairs	Appointed to Stoltenberg's Second Cabinet until October 2007, during which period Ingvild Vaggen Malvik (Business and Industry) met in his place. Committee first deputy chair from 27 November 2007	
Jorodd Asphjell	Labour	Sør-Trøndelag	Health and Care Services		
Ola Borten Moe	Centre Party	Sør-Trøndelag	Energy and the Environment; Business and Industry		
Tord Lien	Progress	Sør-Trøndelag	Energy and the Environment		
Eva Kristin Hansen	Labour	Sør-Trøndelag	Labour and Social Affairs		
Ola T. Lånke	Christian Democratic	Sør-Trøndelag	Education, Research and Church Affairs; Scrutiny and Constitutional Affairs	Leveling seat	
Dag Terje Andersen	Labour	Vestfold	Local Government and Public Administration	Committee chair until 29 September 2006. Appointed to Stoltenberg's Second Cabinet in September 2006. Silvia K. Kosmo (Local Government and Public Administration) met in his place.	
Per Ove Width	Progress	Vestfold	Defence	Committee second deputy chair	
Svein Flåtten	Conservative	Vestfold	Finance and Economic Affairs		
Sonja Mandt-Bartholsen	Labour	Vestfold	Health and Care Services		
Anders Anundsen	Progress	Vestfold	Education, Research and Church Affairs		
Steinar Gullvåg	Labour	Vestfold	Business and Industry		
Inga Marte Thorkildsen	Socialist Left	Vestfold	Health and Care Services; Energy and the Environment	Leveling seat	
Signe Øye	Labour	Østfold	Defence	Committee first deputy chair	
Ulf Leirstein	Progress	Østfold	Finance and Economic Affairs	Committee first deputy chair	
Svein Roald Hansen	Labour	Østfold	Scrutiny and Constitutional Affairs	Committee second deputy chair	
Jon Jæger Gåsvatn	Progress	Østfold	Education, Research and Church Affairs		
Martin Engeset	Conservative	Østfold	Labour and Social Affairs		
Irene Johansen	Labour	Østfold	Transport and Communications		
Vigdis Giltun	Progress	Østfold	Health and Care Services		
May Hansen	Socialist Left	Østfold	Family and Cultural Affairs		
Line Henriette Holten Hjemdal	Christian Democratic	Østfold	Energy and the Environment	Leveling seat	
