= List of members of the Storting, 2009–2013 =

Distribution of seats after the 2009 Norwegian parliamentary election: Socialist Left Party (11) Labour Party (64) Centre Party (11) Liberal Party (2) Christian Democratic Party (10) Conservative Party (30) Progress Party (41)

List of all the members of the Storting in the period 2009 to 2013. The list includes all those initially elected to the Storting. Between 1 October 2009 and 30 September 2013, the Parliament of Norway consisted of 169 members from 7 parties and 19 constituencies, elected during the 2009 Norwegian parliamentary election on 13 and 14 September. The Red-Green Coalition, consisting of the Labour Party (64 members), the Socialist Left Party (11 members) and the Centre Party (11 members) resumed its major, allowing Stoltenberg's Second Cabinet to continue. The majority cabinet lasted the entire session until the 2013 election. The opposition consisted of four parties: the Progress Party (41 members), the Conservative Party (30 members), the Christian Democratic Party (10 members) and the Liberal Party (2 members).

Members of the Parliament of Norway are elected based on party-list proportional representation in plural member constituencies. This means that representatives from different political parties are elected from 19 constituencies, which are identical to the 19 counties. The electorate does not vote for individuals but rather for party lists, with a ranked list of candidates nominated by the party. This means that the person on top of the list will get the seat unless the voter alters the ballot. Parties may nominate candidates from outside their own constituency, and even Norwegian citizens currently living abroad.

The Sainte-Laguë method is used for allocating parliamentary seats to parties. As a result, the percentage of representatives is roughly equal to the nationwide percentage of votes. Still, a party with a high number of votes in only one constituency can win a seat there even if the nationwide percentage is low. This has happened several times in Norwegian history. Conversely, if a party's initial representation in Parliament is proportionally less than its share of votes, the party may seat more representatives through leveling seats, provided that the nationwide percentage is above the election threshold, at 4 percent. In 2013, nineteen seats were allocated via the leveling system.

If a representative is absent for whatever reason, their seat will be filled by a candidate from the same party-list—in other words, there are no by-elections. Representatives who die during the term are replaced permanently, whereas representatives who are appointed to a government position, such as government minister (cabinet member) or state secretary, will be replaced by a deputy representative until the representative no longer holds the government position. Deputy representatives also meet during typically short-term absence, like when a representative travels abroad with a parliamentary work group or is absent for health reasons.

== List of representatives ==
The representatives elected as leveling seats are indicated with a blue background.

Name	Party	Constituency	Comments	Ref
Freddy de Ruiter	Labour	Aust-Agder		
Ingebjørg Godskesen	Progress	Aust-Agder		
Svein Harberg	Conservative	Aust-Agder		
Kjell Ingolf Ropstad	Christian Democratic	Aust-Agder	Leveling seat	
Åse Michaelsen	Progress	Vest-Agder		
Kari Henriksen	Labour	Vest-Agder		
Peter Skovholt Gitmark	Conservative	Vest-Agder		
Dagrun Eriksen	Christian Democratic	Vest-Agder		
Henning Skumsvoll	Progress	Vest-Agder		
Alf Egil Holmelid	Socialist Left	Vest-Agder	Leveling seat	
Sverre Myrli	Labour	Akershus		
Morten Høglund	Progress	Akershus		
Jan Tore Sanner	Conservative	Akershus		
Marianne Aasen	Labour	Akershus		
Kari Kjønaas Kjos	Progress	Akershus		
Sonja Irene Sjøli	Conservative	Akershus		
Gunvor Eldegard	Labour	Akershus		
Hans Frode Kielland Asmyhr	Progress	Akershus		
Gorm Kjernli	Labour	Akershus		
Sylvi Graham	Conservative	Akershus		
Bård Vegar Solhjell	Socialist Left	Akershus	Member of Stoltenberg's Second Cabinet from March 2012. Rannveig Kvifte Andresen meets in his place.	
Anniken Huitfeldt	Labour	Akershus	Member of the Stoltenberg's Second Cabinet from February 2008. Are Helseth meets in her place.	
Borghild Tenden	Liberal	Akershus		
Ib Thomsen	Progress	Akershus		
André Oktay Dahl	Conservative	Akershus		
Knut Arild Hareide	Christian Democratic	Akershus	Leveling seat	
Martin Kolberg	Labour	Buskerud		
Ulf Erik Knudsen	Progress	Buskerud		
Trond Helleland	Conservative	Buskerud		
Lise Christoffersen	Labour	Buskerud		
Jørund Rytman	Progress	Buskerud		
Torgeir Micaelsen	Labour	Buskerud		
Anders B. Werp	Conservative	Buskerud		
Laila Gustavsen	Labour	Buskerud		
Per Olaf Lundteigen	Centre	Buskerud	Leveling seat	
Helga Pedersen	Labour	Finnmark		
Jan-Henrik Fredriksen	Progress	Finnmark		
Kåre Simensen	Labour	Finnmark		
Ingalill Olsen	Labour	Finnmark		
Frank Bakke Jensen	Conservative	Finnmark	Leveling seat	
Anette Trettebergstuen	Labour	Hedmark		
Thomas Breen	Labour	Hedmark		
Per Roar Bredvold	Progress	Hedmark		
Tone Merete Sønsterud	Labour	Hedmark		
Trygve Slagsvold Vedum	Centre	Hedmark	Member of Stoltenberg's Second Cabinet from June 2012. Olov Grøtting met in his place.	
Gunnar Gundersen	Conservative	Hedmark		
Knut Storberget	Labour	Hedmark	Member of Stoltenberg's Second Cabinet until October 2011. Thor Lillehovde met in his place.	
Karin Andersen	Socialist Left	Hedmark	Leveling seat	
Per Rune Henriksen	Labour	Hordaland	State Secretary in the Stoltenberg's Second Cabinet from September 2010. Jette F. Christensen meets in his place.	
Arne Sortevik	Progress	Hordaland		
Erna Solberg	Conservative	Hordaland		
Hilde Magnusson Lydvo	Labour	Hordaland		
Gjermund Hagesæter	Progress	Hordaland		
Øyvind Halleraker	Conservative	Hordaland		
Dag Ole Teigen	Labour	Hordaland		
Laila Dåvøy	Christian Democratic	Hordaland		
Karin S. Woldseth	Progress	Hordaland		
Magne Rommetveit	Labour	Hordaland		
Henning Warloe	Conservative	Hordaland		
Kjersti Toppe	Centre	Hordaland		
Audun Lysbakken	Socialist Left	Hordaland	Member of Stoltenberg's Second Cabinet from October 2009 to March 2012. Gina Barstad met in his place.	
Anne-Grete Strøm-Erichsen	Labour	Hordaland	Member of Stoltenberg's Second Cabinet. Tove Linnea Brandvik meets in her place.	
Laila Marie Reiertsen	Progress	Hordaland	Leveling seat	
Else-May Botten	Labour	Møre og Romsdal		
Harald T. Nesvik	Progress	Møre og Romsdal		
Elisabeth Røbekk Nørve	Conservative	Møre og Romsdal		
Svein Gjelseth	Labour	Møre og Romsdal		
Oskar Jarle Grimstad	Progress	Møre og Romsdal		
Tove-Lise Torve	Labour	Møre og Romsdal		
Jenny Klinge	Centre	Møre og Romsdal		
Rigmor Andersen Eide	Christian Democratic	Møre og Romsdal		
Mette Hanekamhaug	Progress	Møre og Romsdal	Leveling seat	
Tor-Arne Strøm	Labour	Nordland		
Kenneth Svendsen	Progress	Nordland		
Anna Ljunggren	Labour	Nordland		
Ivar Kristiansen	Conservative	Nordland		
Jan Arild Ellingsen	Progress	Nordland		
Eirik Sivertsen	Labour	Nordland		
Janne Sjelmo Nordås	Centre	Nordland		
Lillian Hansen	Labour	Nordland		
Geir-Ketil Hansen	Socialist Left	Nordland		
Torgeir Trældal	Progress	Nordland	Leveling seat	
Torstein Rudihagen	Labour	Oppland		
Rigmor Aasrud	Labour	Oppland	Member of Stoltenberg's Second Cabinet since October 2009. Stine Renate Håheim meets in her place.	
Morten Ørsal Johansen	Progress	Oppland		
Tore Hagebakken	Labour	Oppland		
Anne Tingelstad Wøien	Centre	Oppland		
Olemic Thommessen	Conservative	Oppland		
Aksel Hagen	Socialist Left	Oppland	Leveling seat	
Marit Nybakk	Labour	Oslo		
Per-Kristian Foss	Conservative	Oslo		
Siv Jensen	Progress	Oslo		
Jan Bøhler	Labour	Oslo		
Heikki Holmås	Socialist Left	Oslo	Member of Stoltenberg's Second Cabinet from March 2012. Mari Lund Arnem met in his place until April 2012, then Akhtar Chaudhry.	
Ine Marie Eriksen Søreide	Conservative	Oslo		
Marianne Marthinsen	Labour	Oslo		
Christian Tybring-Gjedde	Progress	Oslo		
Hadia Tajik	Labour	Oslo	Member of Stoltenberg's Second Cabinet from September 2012. Karin Yrvin meets in her place.	
Trine Skei Grande	Liberal	Oslo		
Michael Tetzschner	Conservative	Oslo		
Jens Stoltenberg	Labour	Oslo	Prime Minister in the Stoltenberg's Second Cabinet. Håkon Haugli meets in his place.	
Peter N. Myhre	Progress	Oslo		
Kristin Halvorsen	Socialist Left	Oslo	Member of the Stoltenberg's Second Cabinet. Akhtar Chaudhry met in her place until 2012, then Heidi Sørensen.	
Jonas Gahr Støre	Labour	Oslo	Member of the Stoltenberg's Second Cabinet. Truls Wickholm meets in his place.	
Nikolai Astrup	Conservative	Oslo		
Hans Olav Syversen	Christian Democratic	Oslo	Leveling seat	
Ketil Solvik-Olsen	Progress	Rogaland		
Tore Nordtun	Labour	Rogaland		
Bent Høie	Conservative	Rogaland		
Solveig Horne	Progress	Rogaland		
Eirin Kristin Sund	Labour	Rogaland		
Dagfinn Høybråten	Christian Democratic	Rogaland		
Siri A. Meling	Conservative	Rogaland		
Øyvind Vaksdal	Progress	Rogaland		
Torfinn Opheim	Labour	Rogaland		
Magnhild Meltveit Kleppa	Centre	Rogaland	Member of the Stoltenberg's Second Cabinet until June 2012. Geir Pollestad met in her place.	
Arve Kambe	Conservative	Rogaland		
Bente Thorsen	Progress	Rogaland		
Hallgeir H. Langeland	Socialist Left	Rogaland	Leveling seat	
Ingrid Heggø	Labour	Sogn og Fjordane		
Liv Signe Navarsete	Centre	Sogn og Fjordane	Member of the Stoltenberg's Second Cabinet. Erling Sande meets in her place.	
Åge Starheim	Progress	Sogn og Fjordane		
Tor Bremer	Labour	Sogn og Fjordane		
Bjørn Lødemel	Conservative	Sogn og Fjordane	Leveling seat	
Terje Aasland	Labour	Telemark		
Bård Hoksrud	Progress	Telemark		
Gunn Olsen	Labour	Telemark		
Torbjørn Røe Isaksen	Conservative	Telemark		
Sigvald Oppebøen Hansen	Labour	Telemark		
Geir Jørgen Bekkevold	Christian Democratic	Telemark	Leveling seat	
Bendiks H. Arnesen	Labour	Troms		
Øyvind Korsberg	Progress	Troms		
Anne Marit Bjørnflaten	Labour	Troms		
Elisabeth Aspaker	Conservative	Troms		
Per-Willy Amundsen	Progress	Troms		
Tove Karoline Knutsen	Labour	Troms		
Irene Lange Nordahl	Centre	Troms	Leveling seat	
Gerd Janne Kristoffersen	Labour	Nord-Trøndelag		
Arild Stokkan-Grande	Labour	Nord-Trøndelag		
Robert Eriksson	Progress	Nord-Trøndelag		
Lars Peder Brekk	Centre	Nord-Trøndelag	Member of the Stoltenberg's Second Cabinet until June 2012. Christina Ramsøy met in his place.	
Susanne Bratli	Labour	Nord-Trøndelag		
Lars Myraune	Conservative	Nord-Trøndelag	Leveling seat	
Gunn Karin Gjul	Labour	Sør-Trøndelag		
Per Sandberg	Progress	Sør-Trøndelag		
Jorodd Asphjell	Labour	Sør-Trøndelag		
Linda Cathrine Hofstad Helleland	Conservative	Sør-Trøndelag		
Eva Kristin Hansen	Labour	Sør-Trøndelag		
Tord Lien	Progress	Sør-Trøndelag		
Trond Giske	Labour	Sør-Trøndelag	Member of Stoltenberg's Second Cabinet. Arne L. Haugen meets in his place.	
Snorre Valen	Socialist Left	Sør-Trøndelag		
Ola Borten Moe	Centre	Sør-Trøndelag	Member of Stoltenberg's Second Cabinet since March 2011. Heidi Greni meets in his place.	
Øyvind Håbrekke	Christian Democratic	Sør-Trøndelag	Leveling seat	
Dag Terje Andersen	Labour	Vestfold		
Anders Anundsen	Progress	Vestfold		
Svein Flåtten	Conservative	Vestfold		
Sonja Mandt-Bartholsen	Labour	Vestfold		
Per Arne Olsen	Progress	Vestfold		
Steinar Gullvåg	Labour	Vestfold		
Inga Marte Thorkildsen	Socialist Left	Vestfold	Leveling seat. Member of Stoltenberg's Second Cabinet from March 2012. Lars Egeland meets in her place.	
Svein Roald Hansen	Labour	Østfold		
Ulf Leirstein	Progress	Østfold		
Irene Johansen	Labour	Østfold		
Ingjerd Schou	Conservative	Østfold		
Jon Jæger Gåsvatn	Progress	Østfold		
Thor Erik Forsberg	Labour	Østfold		
Wenche Olsen	Labour	Østfold		
Vigdis Giltun	Progress	Østfold		
Line Henriette Holten Hjemdal	Christian Democratic	Østfold	Leveling seat	
