= Eilertsen =

Eilertsen is a surname. Notable people with the surname include:

- Eilert Eilertsen (1918–2014), Norwegian footballer and politician
- Kristian Eilertsen (born 1994), Norwegian politician
- Maryon Eilertsen 1950–2015), Norwegian actress
- Mats Eilertsen (born 1975), Norwegian musician and composer
- Nikolai Eilertsen (born 1978), Norwegian bass guitarist
- Trine Eilertsen (born 1969), Norwegian newspaper editor
