= Hauglid =

Hauglid is a surname. Notable people with the surname include:

- Brian M. Hauglid (born 1954), American historian
- Ranja Hauglid (born 1945), Norwegian politician
- Roar Hauglid (1910–2001), Norwegian historian
