= Kent Gudmundsen =

Norwegian politician (born 1978)

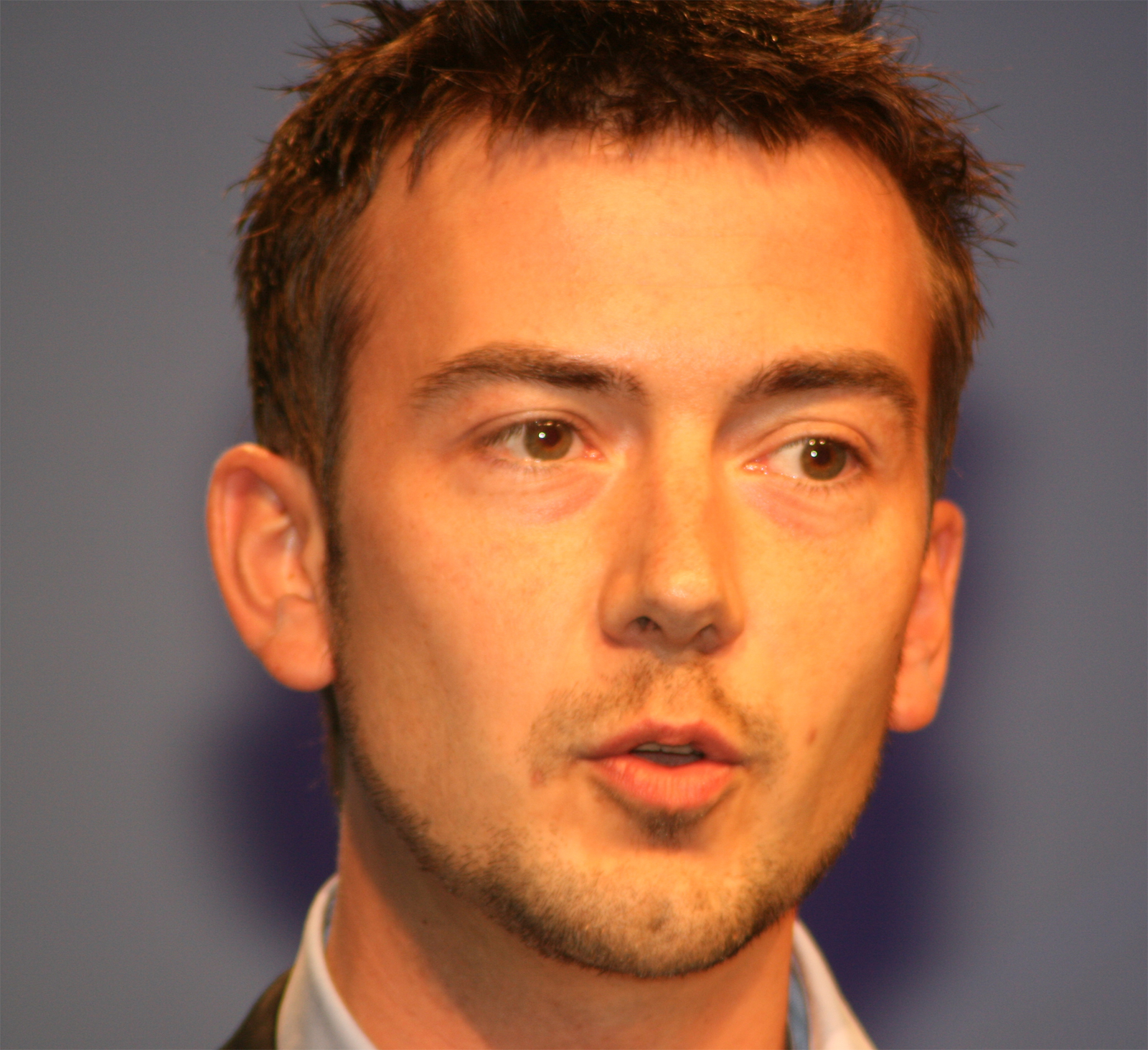
- Kent Gudmundsen

Member of the Storting
- In office 1 October 2013 – 30 September 2021
- Constituency: Troms

Deputy Member of the Storting
- In office 1 October 2001 – 30 September 2013
- Constituency: Troms

Personal details
- Born: 5 March 1978 (age 48) Harstad, Norway
- Party: Conservative
- Occupation: Politician

Kent Gudmundsen (born 5 March 1978) is a Norwegian politician for the Conservative Party. He was a member of the Storting from 2013 to 2021.

== Biography ==
A politician for the Conservative Party, Gudmundsen was elected to the Parliament of Norway from the constituency of Troms in 2013, where he was a member of the Standing Committee on Education, Research and Church Affairs.

He was re-elected to the Storting in 2017, and was a member of the Standing Committee on Education and Research from 2017 to 2021.
