= Erlend Svardal Bøe =

Norwegian politician (born 1992)

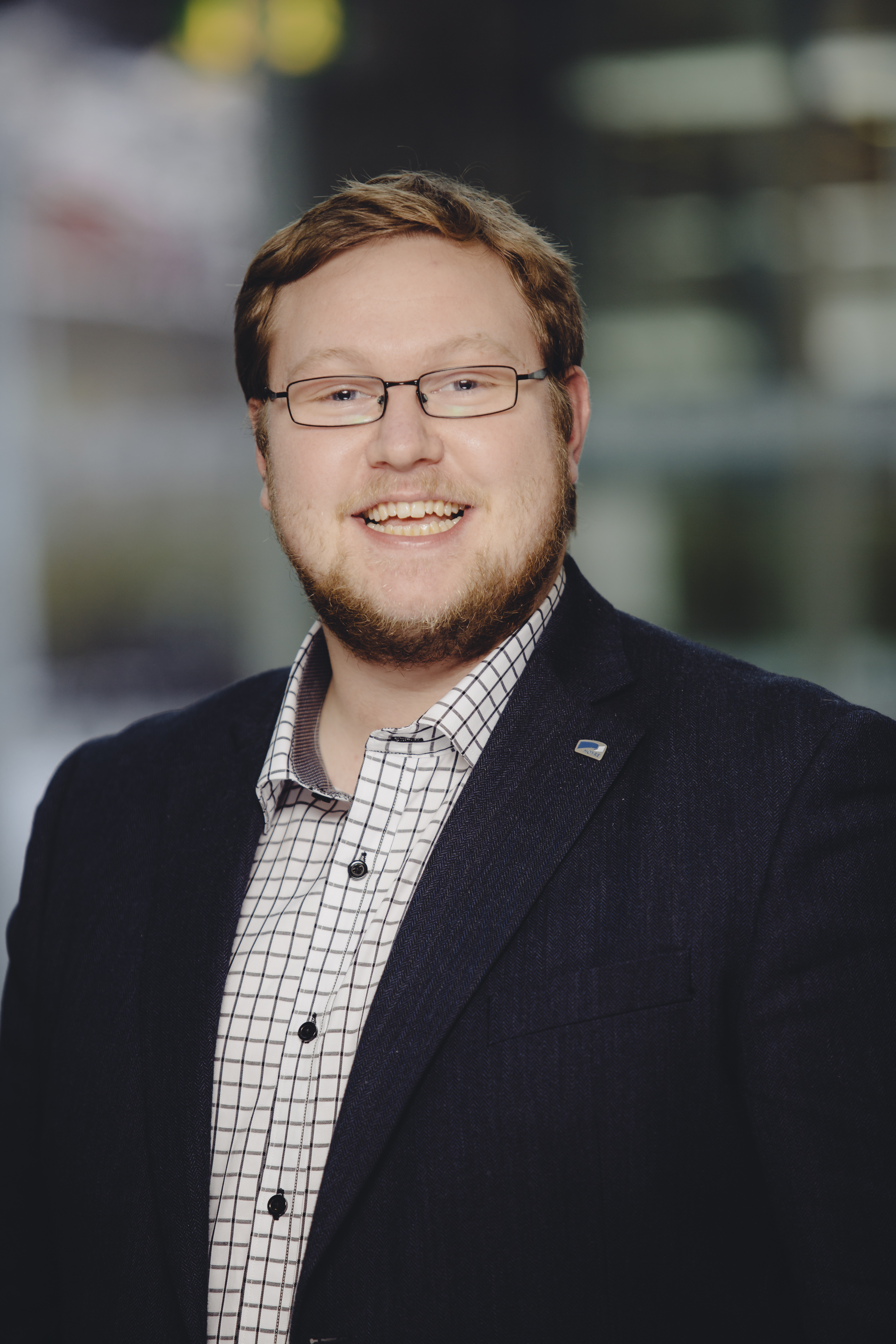

Member of the Storting
- Incumbent
- Assumed office 1 October 2021
- Constituency: Troms

Personal details
- Born: 30 December 1992 (age 33)
- Party: Conservative
- Occupation: Politician

Erlend Svardal Bøe (born 30 December 1992) is a Norwegian politician.

Bøe was a member of Tromsø city council from 2015 to 2021. He was elected representative to the Storting from the constituency of Troms in 2021, for the Conservative Party. He was re-elected in 2025.

He was secretary-general for Unge Høyre (the Norwegian Young Conservatives) from 2015 to 2017. In 2021 he was state secretary at the Ministry of Health.

Party political offices
Preceded by Christopher Wand	Secretary-general of the Norwegian Young Conservatives; 2015–2017	Succeeded by Maria Barstad Sanner
