= Jan Elvheim =

Norwegian politician (1949–2019)

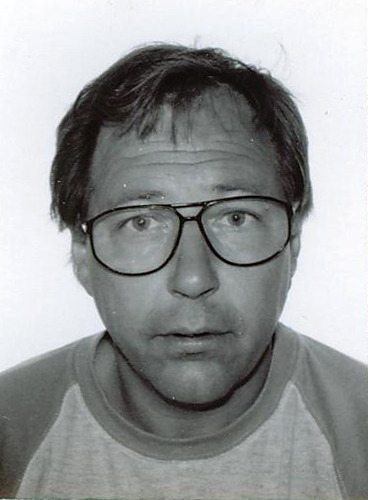
- Elvheim in 1993
- Born: 8 July 1949; Vefsn Municipality, Norway
- Died: 17 May 2019 (aged 69)
- Occupation: Politician
- Political party: Labour

Jan Elvheim (8 July 1949 – 17 May 2019) was a Norwegian politician. He was a member of the Storting from 1989 to 1993.

He was born in Vefsn Municipality on 8 July 1949 to Johan Elvheim and Anne Hagen. Elvheim was elected representative to the Storting from the constituency of Troms for the period 1989–1993, for the Labour Party. He also served as a deputy representative in 1985–1989 and 1993–1997.

Working as a seaman before settling as an industrial labourer in Harstad in 1971, he served on the municipal council of Harstad Municipality from 1979 to 1987.

He died on 17 May 2019.
