= Hanne Stenvaag =

Norwegian politician (born 1971)

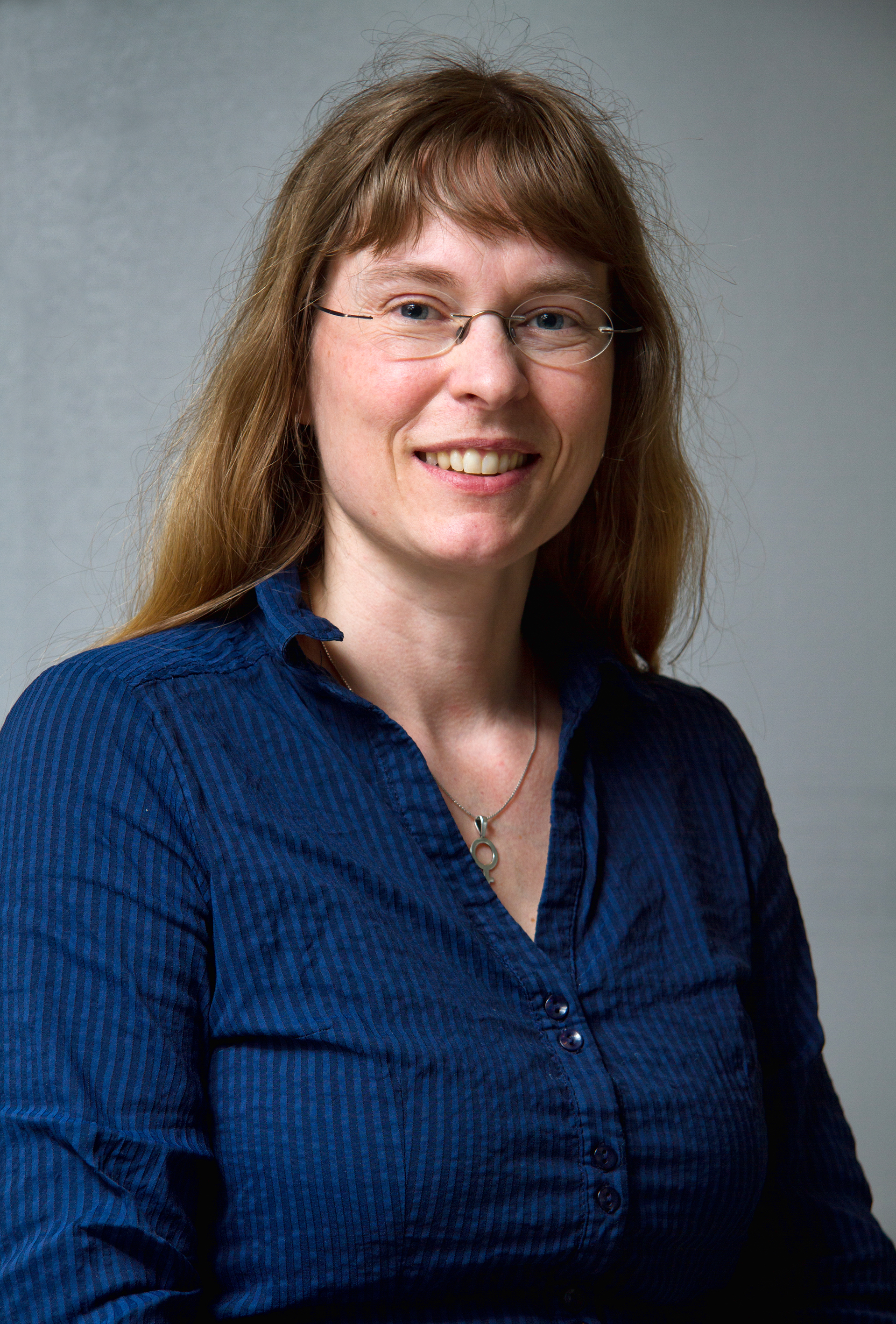
- Stenvaag in 2012

Member of the Storting
- Incumbent
- Assumed office 1 October 2025
- Constituency: Troms

Chair of the Standing Committee on Local Government and Public Administration
- Incumbent
- Assumed office 15 October 2025
- First Deputy: Erlend Wiborg
- Second Deputy: Sigurd Kvammen Rafaelsen
- Preceded by: Sverre Myrli

Personal details
- Born: 20 May 1971 (age 55)
- Party: Red Party
- Education: University of Tromsø

Hanne Beate Stenvaag (born 20 May 1971) is a Norwegian politician and member of the Storting. A member of the Red Party, she was elected to represent Troms at the 2025 parliamentary election.

== Early life and education ==
Stenvaag was born on 20 May 1971. She is originally from Oslo but has lived in Tromsø since studying theology at the University of Tromsø. She has worked as a substitute teacher, a social worker for the Church City Mission and at the Utekontakten in Tromsø. She was also a research fellow in religious studies in the Department of Archaeology, History, Religious Studies and Theology at the University of Tromsø. She is currently head of the crisis centre in Tromsø.

== Career ==
Stenvaag has served several terms on the municipal council in Tromsø. She was the Red Party's first placed candidate in Troms at the 2021 parliamentary election but the party failed to win any seats in the constituency. She was elected to the Storting at the 2025 parliamentary election as one of the Red Party's five compensatory (levelling) seats. She was also chosen to be the new chair of the Standing Committee on Local Government and Public Administration for the period of 2025–2029.
