= Arnljot Norwich =

Norwegian politician

Arnljot Norwich (29 December 1922, Harstad - 28 December 1994) was a Norwegian politician for the Conservative Party.

He was elected to the Norwegian Parliament from Troms in 1977, and was re-elected on two occasions. He had previously served in the position of deputy representative during the term 1973–1977. From 1985 he was Vice President of the Storting.

Born in Harstad, he was a member of Harstad city council from 1963 to 1977, serving as deputy mayor from 1967 to 1969 and mayor from 1970 to 1977. From 1970 to 1977 he was also a member of Troms county council. He chaired the local party chapter from 1965 to 1966.

For many years, from 1949 to 1984, he ran the electrical firm Brødrene Norwich together with his brother in Harstad. He was married to Signe Marie Norwich (1927–1993).
