= Rolf Ketil Bjørn =

Norwegian businessperson and politician

Rolf Ketil Bjørn (18 January 1938 – 24 November 2008) was a Norwegian businessperson and politician for the Socialist Left Party.

Bjørn was born in Kåfjord Municipality as the son of director Rolf Bjørn (1906–2000) and housewife Mariane Malvik (1908–1993). He finished his secondary education in 1957, and eventually enrolled at the Norwegian School of Management. He worked in the private company Gustaf Aspelin from 1964 to 1962, and in the family business Ric Bjørn from 1964 to 1989. Despite his social background in the petite bourgeoisie, he became a member of left-wing political groups. For this, he earned the nickname "the red millionaire". From 1959 to 1964 he was a member of the secretariat of the Young Communist League of Norway, having chaired the local branch in Tromsø from 1952 to 1957. From 1966 he held local leadership in the Socialist People's Party, which later became the Socialist Left Party. He opposed Norwegian membership in the European Union and NATO. Nonetheless, he did favor cooperation with the social democratic Labour Party, both locally as well as in the national Red-Green Coalition.

He was elected to serve on the municipal council of Tromsø Municipality in 1987. Halfway through the term, in 1989, he was elected to represent Troms county in the Norwegian Parliament. He was re-elected in 1993 for a second, but final term. After this he served more terms in the municipal council. He finally retired in 2007.

Bjørn was married, and had three children. He died in November 2008, at the University Hospital of North Norway, of cancer.
