= Helge Jakobsen =

Norwegian politician

Helge Jakobsen (31 August 1901 – 25 September 1996) was a Norwegian politician for the Liberal Party and later the Liberal People's Party. He was born in Tromsøysund Municipality.

He was elected to the Norwegian Parliament from Troms in 1961, and was re-elected on three occasions. During his fourth term, in December 1972, Jakobsen joined the Liberal People's Party which split from the Liberal Party over disagreements of Norway's proposed entry to the European Economic Community.

Jakobsen was a member of the city council of Tromsø in the periods 1936–1937, 1937–1940, 1945–1947 and 1947–1949.
