= Rolf Nilssen =

Norwegian politician

Rolf Nilssen (25 January 1928 – 13 July 2012) was a Norwegian politician for the Labour Party.

He was born in Narvik. On the local level he was a member of the executive committee of the municipal council for Narvik Municipality from 1951 to 1963, and of the executive committee of the municipal council for Tromsø Municipality from 1967 to 1975. He chaired the regional party chapters in Salten, Tromsø, and Troms.

He was elected to the Parliament of Norway from Troms in 1977, and was re-elected on two occasions.

Outside politics he spent large parts of his career working on Ofotbanen.
