= Johannes Gilleberg =

Norwegian politician

Johannes Gilleberg (1 August 1915 – 8 August 2002) was a Norwegian politician who represented the Centre Party in Troms in the Norwegian Parliament for three election periods from 1965 to 1977.

Gilleberg had a priestly education (cand.theol. 1946, internship 1948). He then worked in Hammerfest as assistant professor and assistant priest until 1955. He became concerned with the situation of persons with intellectual disabilities, or the mentally impaired, which was the term of the time. He became concerned with the situation of persons with intellectual disabilities, or the mentally impaired, which was the term of the time. He was central to the work to establish a Northern Norwegian intellectual home, and later chairman of the building and planning committee for such a home at Trastad farm in Kvæfjord. From 1955 he was employed as manager at this home for the mentally impaired in Northern Norway. In 1956 he had a scholarship to study social care in the Nordic countries and in 1963 to study the educational program in "mentally impaired care" in Denmark and Germany.Gilleberg was a member of the municipal council in Kvæfjord from 1963 to 1971. He was elected to the Norwegian Parliament in the autumn of 1965 and re-elected in 1969 and 1973. The last two times he ran on joint lists with the Christian People's Party and the Liberal Party respectively. He was a member of the Social Affairs Committee, with the exception of a period in 1971–72 when he served on the Administrative Committee.
