= Standing Committee on Defence =

Standing Committee on Defence (SCOF) is usually a parliamentary committee of parliaments of nations following a parliamentary system of governance. It generally scrutinises the government's actions on defence-related matters.

== List of Standing Committees on Defence ==
- Standing Committee on Defence (Norway)
- Standing Committee on Defence (India)
