= Frithjov Meier Vik =

Norwegian politician

Frithjov Meier Vik (15 March 1902 – 2 January 1986) was a Norwegian politician for the Conservative Party.

He was born in Kvæfjord Municipality.

He was elected to the Norwegian Parliament from Troms county in 1954, and was re-elected on two occasions.

Vik was deputy mayor of Kvæfjord Municipality in 1950–1951 and 1951–1954.
