= Aldor Ingebrigtsen =

Norwegian politician

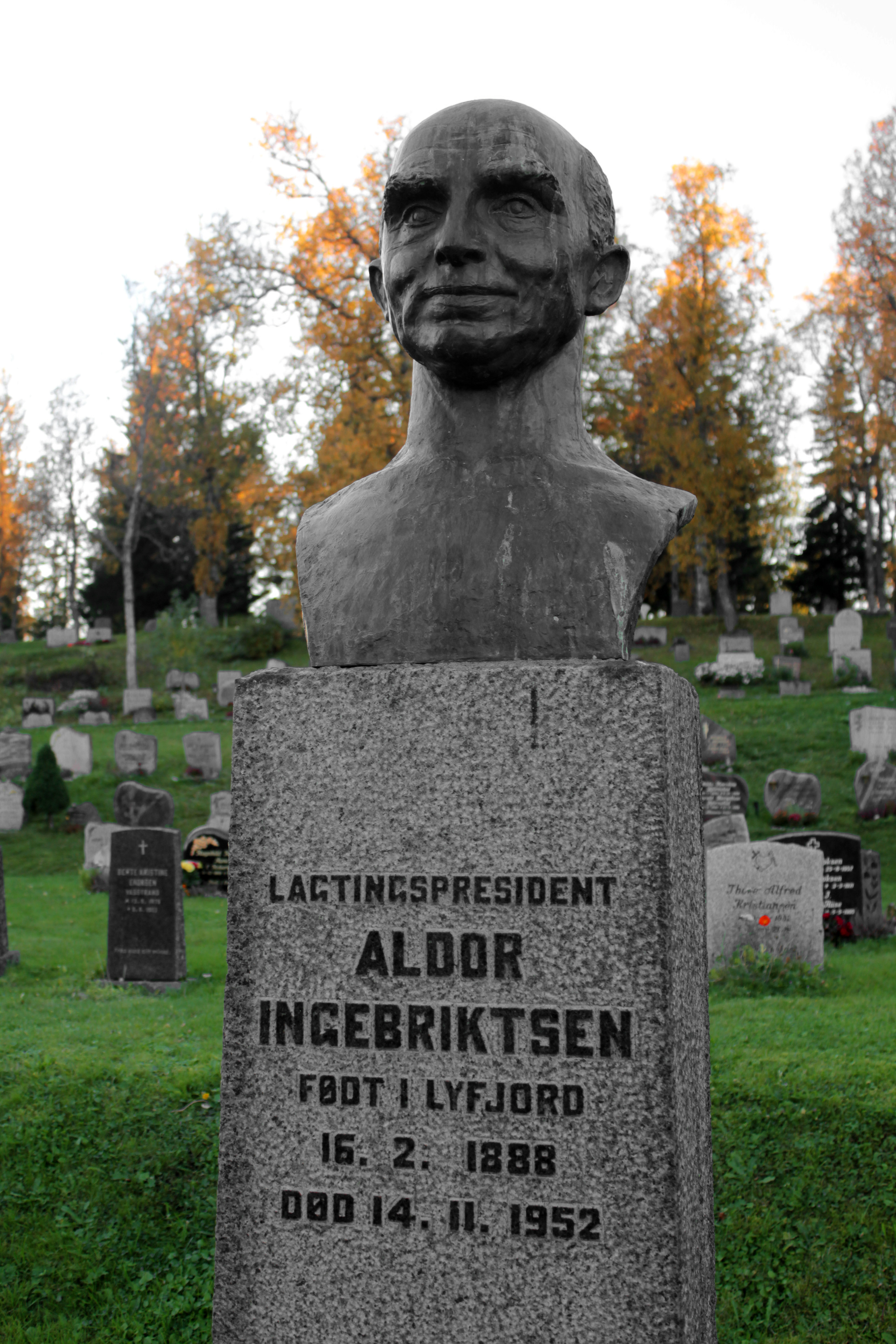
Monument of Aldor Ingebrigtsen at Tromsø graveyard

Aldor Ingebrigtsen (16 February 1888–14 November 1952) was a Norwegian politician for the Labour Party.

He was born in the hamlet of Lyfjord, on the island of Kvaløya in Tromsøysund Municipality.

He was elected to the Norwegian Parliament from Troms county in 1922, and was re-elected on seven occasions. During his eighth term, he died and was replaced by Hans Kristian Hauan.

Ingebrigtsen was a member of the municipal council for Tromsøysund Municipality from 1916 to 1919, and later of its executive committee from 1925 to 1934.
