= Per Almar Aas =

Norwegian politician (1929–2014)

Norwegian Parliament
- In office 1973–1989

Troms county council
- In office 1971–1975

Municipal council of Harstad Municipality
- In office 1967–1971

Personal details
- Born: 11 June 1929 Ballangen Municipality
- Died: 18 May 2014 (aged 84)
- Political party: Christian Democratic Party

Per Almar Aas (11 June 1929 – 18 May 2014) was a Norwegian politician for the Christian Democratic Party.

== Life and career ==
Aas was born in Ballangen Municipality. He was elected to the Norwegian Parliament from Troms in 1973, and was re-elected on three occasions. He had previously served as a deputy representative during the term 1969–1973.

On the local level he was a member of the municipal council for Harstad Municipality from 1967 to 1971. From 1971 to 1975 he was a member of Troms county council. He chaired the county party chapter from 1970 to 1973, and was a member of the national party board from 1970 to 1973 and 1985 to 1999.

Outside politics he started his career as a manual laborer in Ballangen Municipality (1945–1950), Snåsa Municipality (1951), Ørsta Municipality (1951–1952) and Volda Municipality (1952–1953). In 1969 he settled in Harstad Municipality to become a school teacher.
