= Tor Nymo =

Norwegian politician

- Born: July 3, 1940 (age 86); Målselv Municipality, Norway
- Occupations: Politician; farmer; soldier
- Office: Member of the Norwegian Parliament
- Political party: Centre Party
- Awards: UNEF Medal (1964)

Tor Nymo (born 3 July 1940 in Målselv Municipality) is a Norwegian politician for the Centre Party.

He was elected to the Norwegian Parliament from Troms in 1993, and was re-elected on one occasion. On the local level, Nymo was a member of the executive committee of the municipal council of Målselv Municipality from 1991 to 1993.

When not involved in politics, Nymo was a farmer and soldier, having served in the United Nations Emergency Force on the Gaza Strip from 1963–1966. For this he was awarded the UNEF Medal in 1964.
