= Hans Nikolai Stavrand =

Norwegian politician

Hans Nikolai Stavrand (4 January 1894 – 17 March 1980) was a Norwegian politician for the Liberal Party.

He was born in Trondenes.

He was elected to the Norwegian Parliament from Troms in 1950, and was re-elected on two occasions. He had previously served in the position of deputy representative during the terms 1934–1936 and 1937–1945.

Stavrand held various positions on the municipal council for Sandtorg Municipality between 1931 and 1956, serving as deputy mayor in 1937–1940.
