= Kåre Martin Hansen =

Norwegian politician

Kåre Martin Hansen (14 July 1913 – 26 April 1985) was a Norwegian politician for the Labour Party.

He was born in Hammerfest. He was elected to the Norwegian Parliament from Troms county in 1961, and was re-elected on one occasion. He had previously been a deputy representative from 1958–1961.

Hansen was mayor of Tromsøysund Municipality from 1947 to 1961. He was later a member of the municipal council of Tromsø Municipality from 1971 to 1975.
