= Nils Kristen Jacobsen =

Norwegian politician

Nils Kristen Jacobsen (born 13 August 1908 in Skjervøy, died 25 January 1993) was a Norwegian politician for the Labour Party.

He was elected to the Parliament of Norway from Troms in 1945, and was re-elected on six occasions.

Jacobsen was deputy mayor of Skjervøy Municipality from 1934–1937.

Political offices
Preceded by Trond Halvorsen Wirstad	Chair of the Standing Committee on Transport; 1965–1969	Succeeded by Peter Kjeldseth Moe
