= Asbjørn Sjøthun =

Norwegian politician

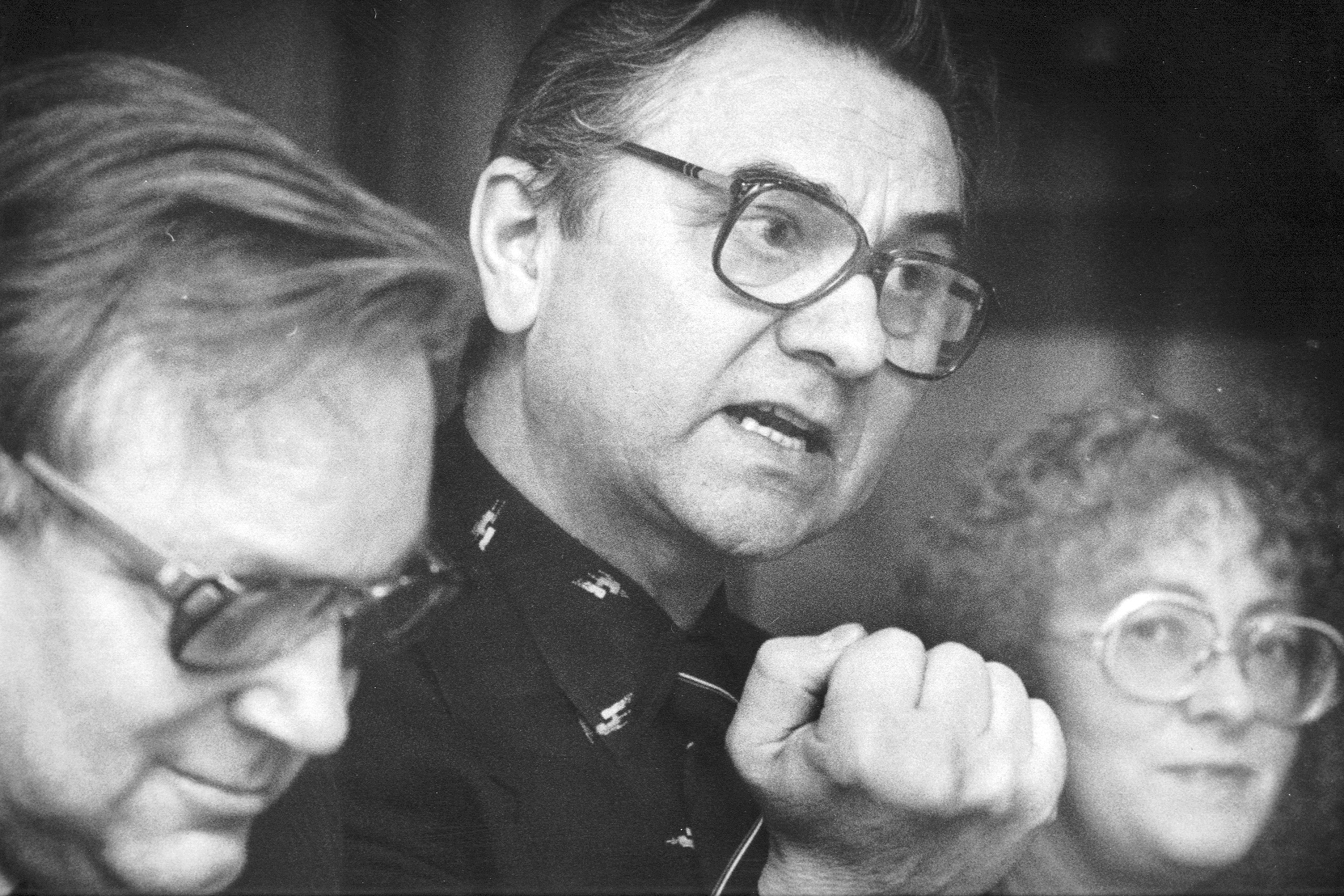
- Asbjørn Sjøthun (center) in the mid-1980s

Member of the Parliament of Norway
- In office 1969–1989
- Constituency: Troms

Personal details
- Born: 20 July 1927; Balsfjord
- Died: 28 March 2010 (aged 82)
- Political party: Labour Party

Asbjørn Sjøthun (20 July 1927 – 28 March 2010) was a Norwegian politician for the Labour Party.

He was born in Balsfjord Municipality, and took a one-year agricultural education at Gibostad. He then worked as a farmer, agronomist and in forestry. He was a member of the municipal council of Balsfjord Municipality from 1955 to 1971, serving as mayor from 1962 to 1969.

He was elected to the Parliament of Norway from Troms county in 1969, and was re-elected on four occasions, his last term ending in 1989. He had previously served as a deputy representative during the terms 1961–1965 and 1965–1969. He was a member of the Standing Committee on Agriculture for all his five terms, serving two terms as secretary and one term (his last term) as leader. He was also a member of the Enlarged Committee on Foreign Affairs and Defence for three terms and the Election Committee for three terms.

He was also a member and deputy chair of the supervisory council of the Norwegian Forest Owners Association between 1992 and 1995. He also held positions in the local sports club Nordkjosbotn IL. He died in March 2010.
