= Margit Hansen-Krone =

Norwegian politician

Margit Hansen-Krone (born 6 April 1925 in Nordreisa) was a Norwegian politician for the Conservative Party.

She was elected to the Norwegian Parliament from Troms in 1977, and was re-elected on two occasions. She had previously served as a deputy representative during the terms 1961–1965, 1965–1969, 1969–1973 and 1973–1977.

On the local level she was a member of the municipal council of Nordreisa Municipality from 1967 to 1977. From 1975 to 1977 she was a deputy member of the Troms county council.

She was active in 4-H.
