= Kristian Eilertsen =

Norwegian politician (born 1994)

Member of the Storting
- Incumbent
- Assumed office 1 October 2025
- Constituency: Troms

Personal details
- Born: 4 August 1994 (age 31)
- Party: Progress Party

Kristian August Eilertsen (born 4 August 1994) is a Norwegian politician who was elected member of the Storting in 2025. He has served as group leader of the Progress Party in the county council of Troms since 2023.
