= Lena Jensen =

Norwegian politician (born 1973)

Lena Jensen (born 29 January 1973 in Tromsø) is a Norwegian politician for the Socialist Left Party (SV). She was elected to the Norwegian Parliament from Troms in 2001.

She served as a member of the Tromsø municipality council from 1995 to 2001.

== Parliamentary Committee duties ==
- 2005–2009: member of the Standing Committee on Education, Research and Church Affairs
- 2005–2009: deputy member of the Electoral Committee
- 2001–2005: member of the Standing Committee on Education, Research and Church Affairs
