= Ranja Hauglid =

Norwegian politician (born 1945)

Ranja Hauglid (born 25 April 1945 in Stor-Elvdal Municipality) is a Norwegian politician for the Labour Party.

She was elected to the Norwegian Parliament from Troms county in 1981, and was re-elected on three occasions.

Hauglid was a deputy member of the executive committee of the municipal council of Salangen Municipality during the terms 1979–1983 and 1999–2003.
