= Arne L. Haugen =

Norwegian politician

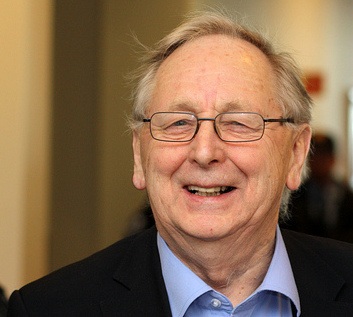
Arne L. Haugen

Arne L. Haugen (born 25 July 1939 in Meldal Municipality) is a Norwegian politician for the Labour Party (AP). He represents Sør-Trøndelag in the Norwegian Parliament, where he meets in the place of Trond Giske, who was appointed to a government position.

He was mayor of Meldal Municipality from 1979 to 2005.

== Parliamentary Committee duties ==
- 2005 - 2009 member of the Standing Committee on Business and Industry.
