= Åge Starheim =

Norwegian politician

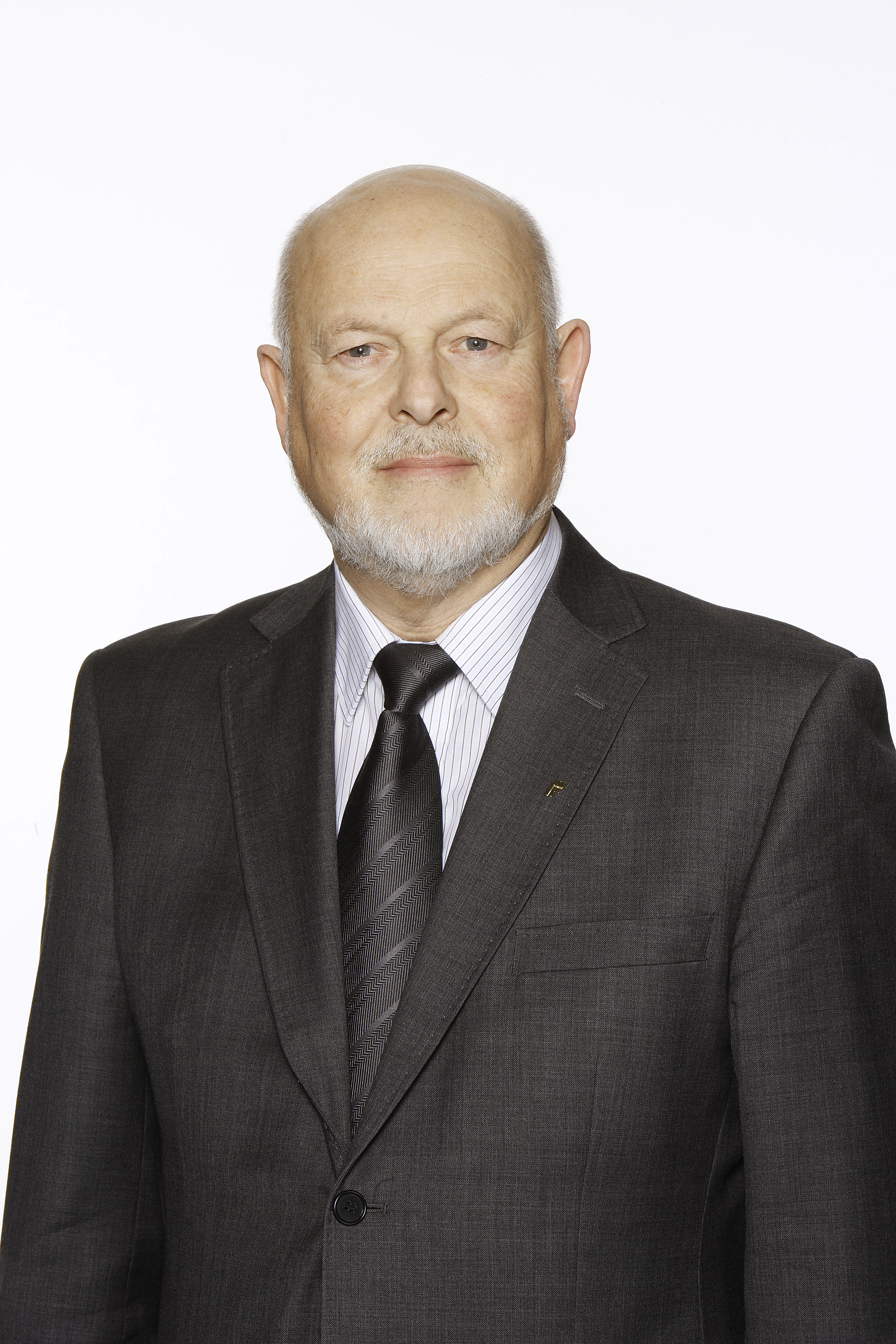
Åge Starheim in 2009

Åge Starheim (born 23 May 1946 in Eid Municipality) is a Norwegian politician, formerly for the Progress Party.

He was elected to the Norwegian Parliament from Sogn og Fjordane in 2005, and represented the Progress Party in parliament for eight years. In 2013 he was made an honorary member of the Progress Party.

Starheim was mayor of Selje Municipality from 1983 to 1989. From 2003 to 2007 he was a member of Sogn og Fjordane county council.

In March 2015 Starheim left the Progress Party, in protest of the conditions and economic scandals in the Sogn og Fjordane branch of the party.
