= Tove Karoline Knutsen =

Norwegian politician (born 1951)

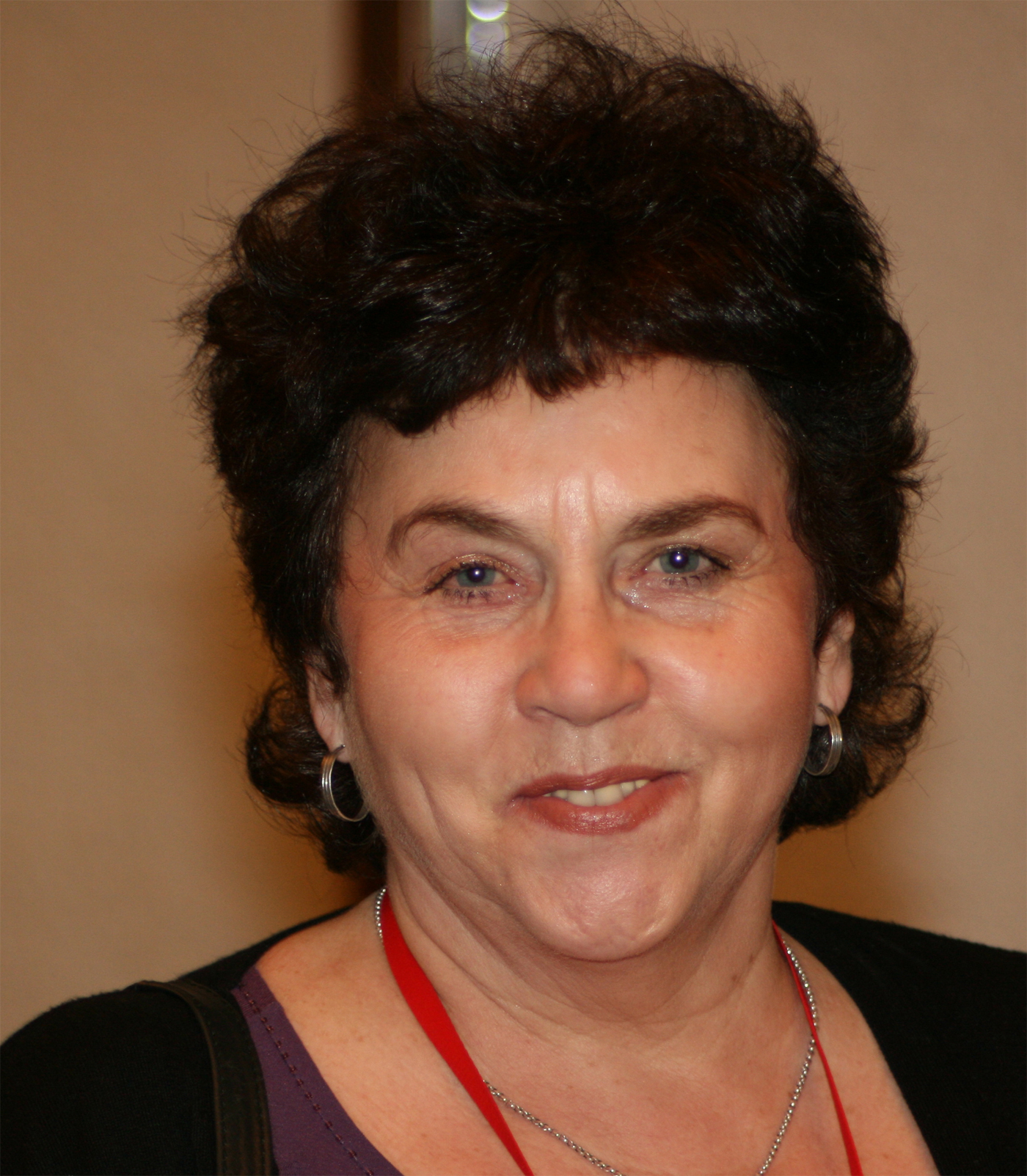
Tove Karoline Knutsen

Tove Karoline Knutsen (born 14 January 1951 in Torsken) is a Norwegian politician for the Labour Party.

She was elected to the Norwegian Parliament from Troms in 2005.

She graduated as cand.philol. in 1982, and spent large parts of her career as a "freelance musician, composer and artist". She was a member of the board of the Norwegian Broadcasting Corporation 1992–1998, Arts Council Norway 2001-2004 and Nesna University College 2001–2005. She was instrumental in the 2014 Olympic bid for Tromsø, which ultimately failed.

== Honors ==
- 1984: Spellemannprisen in the category Folk music
- 1992: Nordlysprisen
