= Bendiks H. Arnesen =

Norwegian politician (1951–2024)

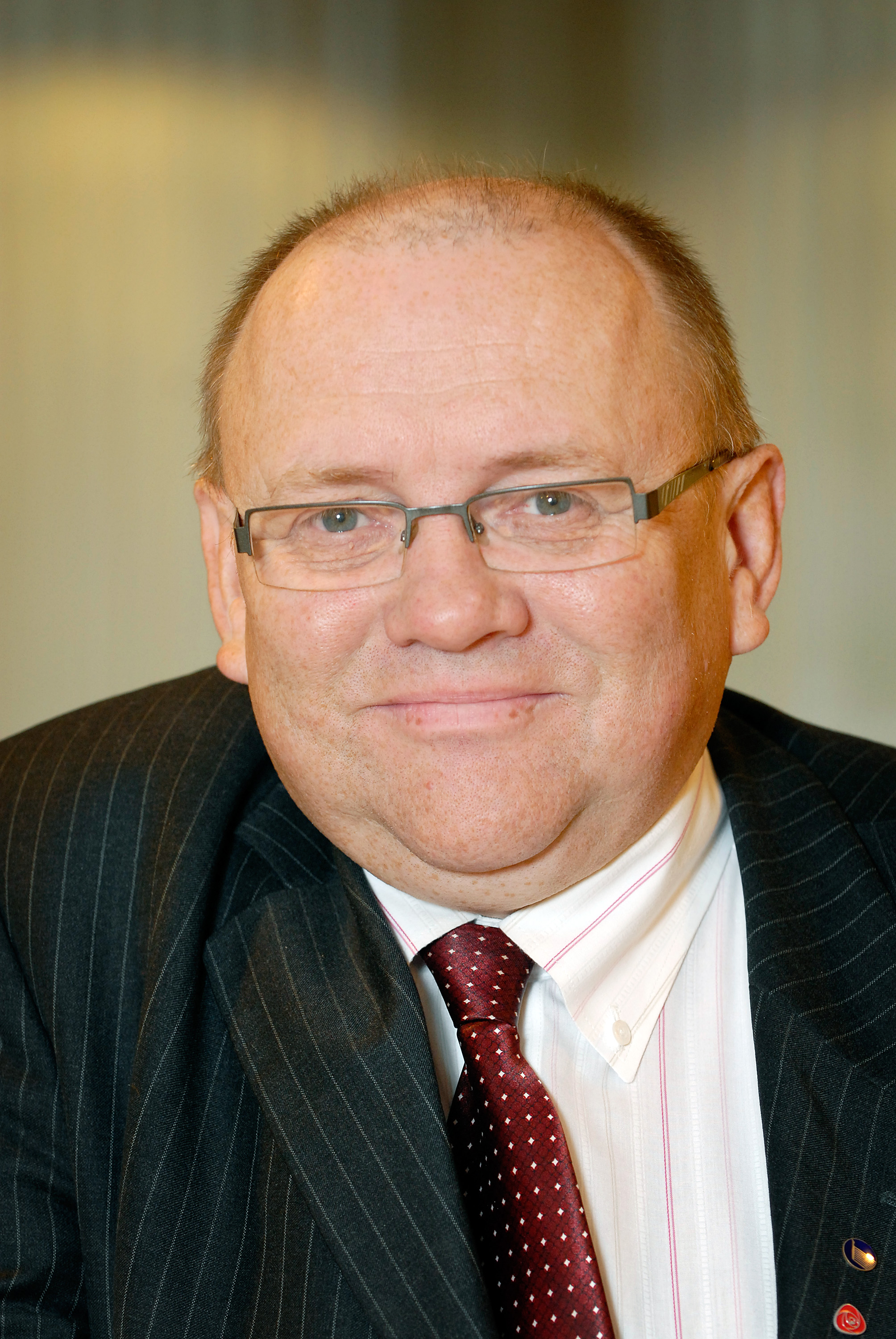
Arnesen in 2007

Bendiks Harald Arnesen (9 June 1951 – 12 November 2024) was a Norwegian politician for the Labour Party.

== Life and career ==
Arnesen was elected to the Norwegian Parliament from Troms in 1997, and has been re-elected on two occasions. He had previously served as a deputy representative during the terms 1989–1993 and 1993–1997.

On the local level he was a member of the municipal council of Kvæfjord Municipality from 1971 to 1975 and 1979 to 1995, serving as deputy mayor in 1983–1985 and mayor from 1986 to 1995. He chaired the municipal party chapter from 1980 to 1986 and the county chapter from 1990 to 1992. He was a member of the Labour Party national board from 1991 to 1992.

He did not have higher education, but mainly worked on a boat before entering national politics.

Arnesen died on 12 November 2024, at the age of 73.

== Sources ==
- "Bendiks H. Arnesen" (in Norwegian). Storting.
