= Øyvind Korsberg =

Norwegian politician (born 1960)

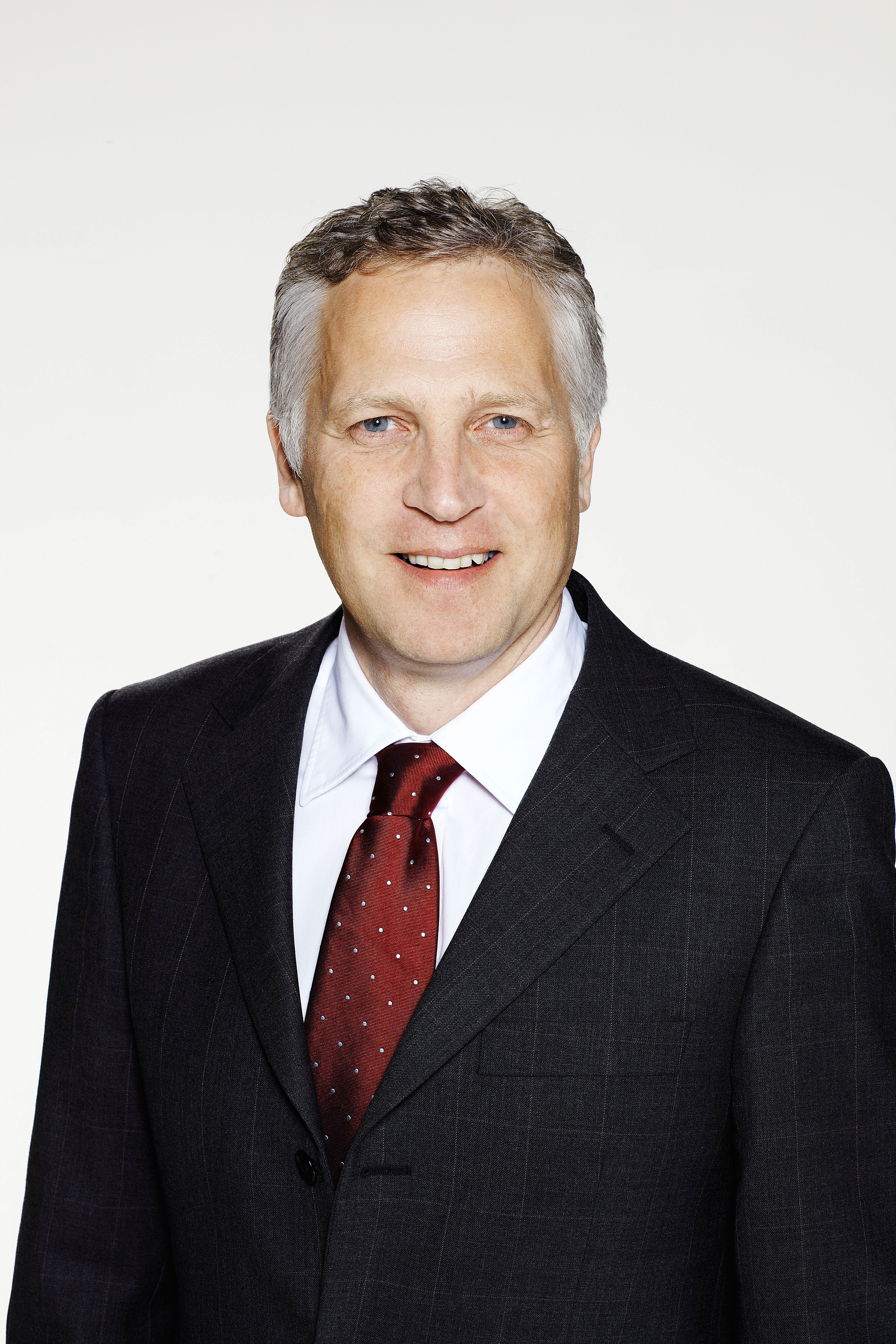
- Korsberg in 2009

First Vice President of the Storting
- In office 8 October 2009 – 30 September 2013
- President: Dag Terje Andersen
- Preceded by: Carl I. Hagen
- Succeeded by: Marit Nybakk

Member of the Norwegian Parliament
- In office 1 October 1997 – 30 September 2017
- Constituency: Troms

Personal details
- Born: 31 January 1960 (age 65); Tromsø, Troms, Norway
- Political party: Progress

Øyvind Korsberg (born 31 January 1960 in Tromsø) is a Norwegian politician for the Progress Party. He was First Vice President of the Storting during the term 2009–2013.

He was elected to the Norwegian Parliament from Troms in 1997, and has been re-elected on two occasions.

Korsberg was a member of the executive committee of Tromsø city council during the term 1991–1995.
