= Anne Marit Bjørnflaten =

Norwegian politician (born 1969)

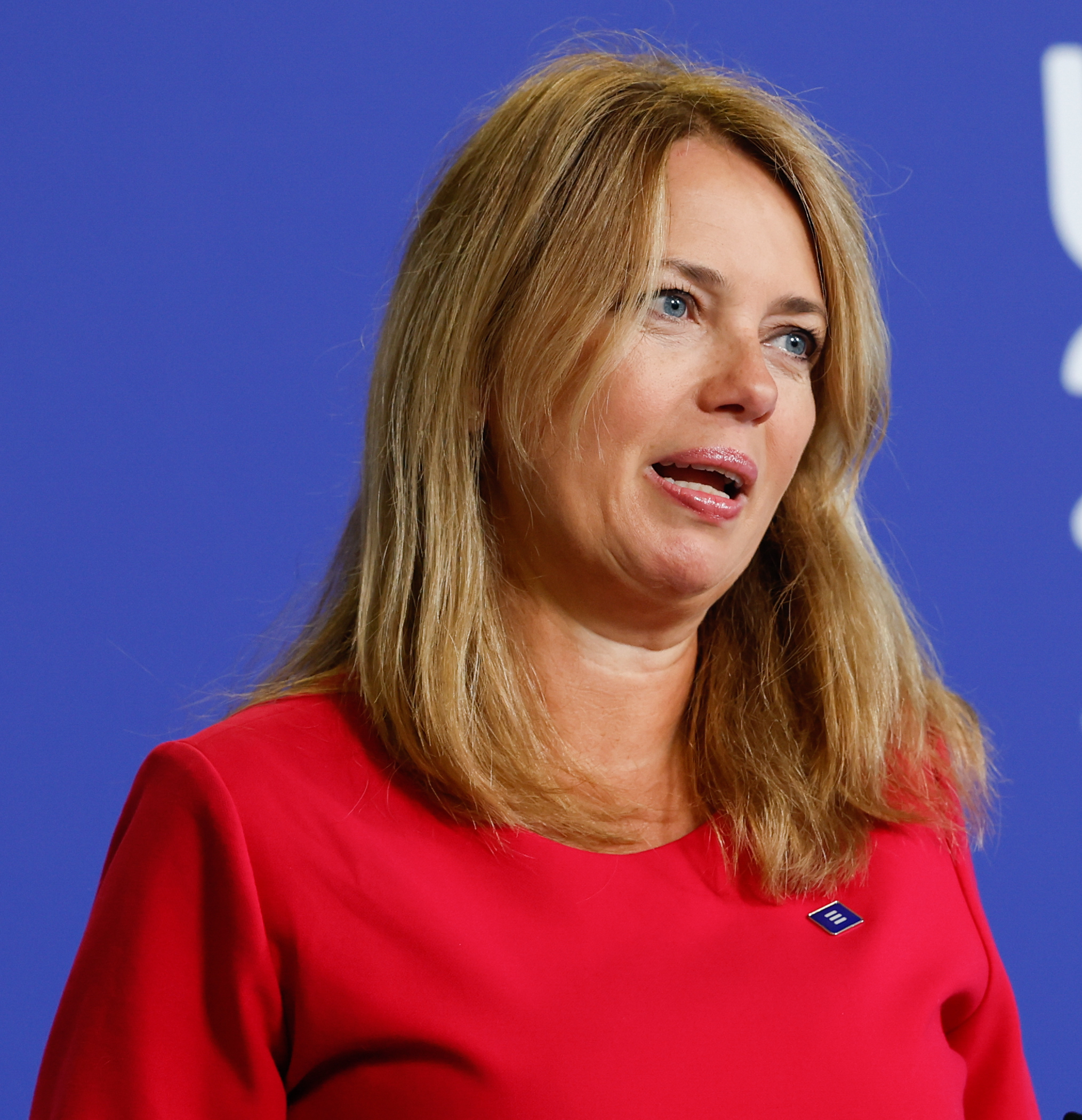
Anne Marit Bjørnflaten in 2023

Anne Marit Bjørnflaten (born 18 June 1969 in Harstad) is a Norwegian politician for the Labour Party.

Between 2000 and 2001, during Stoltenberg's first cabinet, Bjørnflaten was appointed political advisor in the Ministry of Foreign Affairs. She was elected to the Norwegian Parliament from Troms in 2005. She is the leader of the justice committee in the Norwegian Parliament. She did not seek reelection to the parliament in 2013.

On the local level, Bjørnflaten was a member of the executive committee of Tromsø municipality council from 2003 to 2005. From 1991 to 1995 she was a member of Troms county council. She was a member of the Labour Party central board from 2002 to 2005.

On 30 September 2022, she became the new Secretary of state in the Ministry of Trade, Industry and Fisheries.
