= Rogaland (Storting constituency) =

Constituency of the Storting, the national legislature of Norway

- Constituency for the Storting
- Location of Rogaland within Norway
- County: Rogaland
- Population: 505,748 (2025)
- Electorate: 350,312 (2025)
- Area: 9,377 km^{2} (2025)

Current constituency
- Created: 1921
- Seats: List: 13 (2013–present); 12 (2005–2013); 10 (1953–2005); 5 (1921–1953)
- Members of the Storting: List: Pål Morten Borgli (FrP); Julia Eikeland (Ap); May Helen Hetland Ervik (FrP); Ingrid Fiskaa (SV); Margret Hagerup (H); Ruth Mariann Hop (Ap); Mímir Kristjánsson (R); Rune Midtun (FrP); Geir Pollestad (Sp); Morten Sandanger (Ap); Jonas Andersen Sayed (KrF); Kristoffer Sivertsen (FrP); Aleksander Stokkebø (H); Solveig Vik (Ap)
- Created from: List: Dalene; Hesbø and Hafrsfjord; Jæderen; Karmsund; Ryfylke

Rogaland is one of the 19 multi-member constituencies of the Storting, the national legislature of Norway. The constituency was established in 1921 following the introduction of proportional representation for elections to the Storting. It is conterminous with the county of Rogaland. The constituency currently elects 13 of the 169 members of the Storting using the open party-list proportional representation electoral system. At the 2025 parliamentary election it had 350,312 registered electors.

== Electoral system ==
Rogaland currently elects 13 of the 169 members of the Storting using the open (Note: Although technically elections to the Storting have open lists, they are in effect closed lists as a majority of those voting for a party must make changes to the lists for the changes to take effect, which has never happened since the introduction of proportional representation in 1921, and as result candidates are elected in the order submitted by the party.) party-list proportional representation electoral system. Constituency seats are allocated by the County Electoral Committee using the Modified Sainte-Laguë method. Compensatory seats (seats at large or levelling seats) are calculated based on the national vote and are allocated by the National Electoral Committee using the Modified Sainte-Laguë method at the constituency level (one for each constituency). Only parties that reach the 4% national threshold compete for compensatory seats.

== Election results ==
=== Summary ===
Election	Communists K			Reds R / RV / FMS			Socialist Left SV / SF			Labour Ap			Greens MDG			Centre Sp / Bp / L			Liberals V			Christian Democrats KrF			Conservatives H			Progress FrP / ALP		
Election	Votes	%	Seats	Votes	%	Seats	Votes	%	Seats	Votes	%	Seats	Votes	%	Seats	Votes	%	Seats	Votes	%	Seats	Votes	%	Seats	Votes	%	Seats	Votes	%	Seats
2025				15,515	5.50%	1	10,400	3.69%	0	66,739	23.66%	4	7,753	2.75%	0	14,083	4.99%	1	7,453	2.64%	0	23,588	8.36%	1	43,280	15.35%	2	81,020	28.73%	4
2021				9,620	3.72%	0	13,261	5.12%	1	57,969	22.39%	3	6,152	2.38%	0	26,955	10.41%	2	9,106	3.52%	0	20,859	8.06%	1	61,992	23.95%	4	43,382	16.76%	2
2017	75	0.03%	0	2,895	1.15%	0	9,895	3.94%	0	56,340	22.44%	4	6,444	2.57%	0	18,897	7.53%	1	8,851	3.52%	0	21,092	8.40%	1	72,201	28.75%	4	49,451	19.69%	3
2013	67	0.03%	0	1,060	0.44%	0	7,908	3.29%	0	54,462	22.64%	3	5,267	2.19%	0	12,621	5.25%	1	10,827	4.50%	0	25,585	10.63%	2	72,470	30.12%	4	45,082	18.74%	3
2009	61	0.03%	0	908	0.40%	0	10,609	4.68%	0	59,145	26.07%	3	571	0.25%	0	13,144	5.79%	1	10,053	4.43%	0	25,541	11.26%	1	44,289	19.52%	3	60,030	26.46%	4
2005				1,070	0.49%	0	13,759	6.30%	1	53,736	24.60%	3	287	0.13%	0	13,764	6.30%	1	15,370	7.04%	1	26,613	12.18%	1	33,402	15.29%	2	56,995	26.09%	3
2001	94	0.05%	0	1,179	0.57%	0	18,187	8.79%	1	36,857	17.81%	2	265	0.13%	0	10,516	5.08%	0	9,900	4.78%	0	39,294	18.99%	2	46,918	22.67%	3	37,650	18.19%	2
1997	72	0.03%	0	1,894	0.91%	0	8,297	4.00%	0	57,386	27.65%	3	313	0.15%	0	15,600	7.52%	1	11,648	5.61%	0	41,099	19.80%	2	29,892	14.40%	2	38,575	18.59%	2
1993				478	0.25%	0	12,156	6.24%	0	57,037	29.29%	3	225	0.12%	0	34,964	17.95%	2	8,960	4.60%	0	27,909	14.33%	2	31,856	16.36%	2	15,554	7.99%	1
1989				571	0.28%	0	14,552	7.21%	1	53,832	26.68%	3	571	0.28%	0	15,340	7.60%	1	10,452	5.18%	0	29,528	14.63%	1	44,821	22.21%	2	31,072	15.40%	2
1985	157	0.08%	0	365	0.19%	0	6,545	3.45%	0	58,702	30.94%	3				14,101	7.43%	1	9,786	5.16%	0	27,857	14.68%	2	59,524	31.38%	4	11,403	6.01%	0
1981	239	0.13%	0	576	0.32%	0	6,061	3.41%	0	48,121	27.07%	3				12,639	7.11%	1	6,614	3.72%	0	27,902	15.69%	2	59,997	33.74%	3	14,227	8.00%	1
1977	226	0.14%	0	444	0.28%	0	5,171	3.27%	0	49,907	31.57%	4				12,876	8.14%	1	3,718	2.35%	0	33,521	21.20%	2	41,186	26.05%	3	5,322	3.37%	0
1973				278	0.19%	0	11,740	8.22%	1	38,041	26.64%	3				16,693	11.69%	1	4,672	3.27%	0	29,849	20.90%	2	20,944	14.67%	2	11,240	7.87%	1
1969	774	0.55%	0				3,309	2.37%	0	48,649	34.83%	4				16,700	11.96%	1	19,301	13.82%	1	26,716	19.13%	2	23,848	17.07%	2			
1965	876	0.66%	0				5,112	3.87%	0	43,020	32.58%	3				15,053	11.40%	1	23,394	17.72%	2	20,895	15.82%	2	23,510	17.80%	2			
1961	1,922	1.65%	0							41,995	36.08%	3				12,924	11.10%	1	20,142	17.31%	2	18,843	16.19%	2	20,556	17.66%	2			
1957	1,916	1.71%	0							41,220	36.72%	3				12,382	11.03%	1	20,700	18.44%	2	18,060	16.09%	2	17,971	16.01%	2			
1953	2,744	2.45%	0							40,544	36.18%	3				13,178	11.76%	1	19,838	17.70%	2	18,105	16.15%	2	17,666	15.76%	2			
1949	1,218	1.76%	0							19,900	28.82%	2							17,711	25.65%	1	10,406	15.07%	1	19,097	27.66%	1			
1945	2,262	3.94%	0							16,737	29.12%	2				8,767	15.25%	1	15,603	27.15%	1	7,160	12.46%	0	6,947	12.09%	1			
1936										9,898	18.62%	1				10,569	19.89%	1	18,626	35.05%	2				11,707	22.03%	1			
1933	195	0.44%	0							8,465	19.10%	1				12,879	29.06%	1	13,089	29.53%	2				6,933	15.64%	1			
1930	199	0.45%	0							5,381	12.15%	0				14,351	32.39%	2	16,448	37.12%	2				7,927	17.89%	1			
1927										5,736	17.28%	1				11,061	33.33%	2	11,283	34.00%	2				5,107	15.39%	0			
1924	235	0.74%	0							2,058	6.51%	0				6,449	20.39%	1	15,138	47.86%	3				6,532	20.65%	1			
1921										2,287	7.43%	0				7,355	23.90%	1	15,393	50.03%	3				4,224	13.73%	1			

(Excludes compensatory seats. Figures in italics represent joint lists.)

=== Detailed ===
==== 2020s ====
===== 2025 =====
Results of the 2025 parliamentary election held on 8 September 2025:

Party		Votes	%	Seats		
Party		Votes	%	Con.	Com.	Tot.
Progress Party	FrP	81,020	28.73%	4	0	4
Labour Party	Ap	66,739	23.66%	4	0	4
Conservative Party	H	43,280	15.35%	2	0	2
Christian Democratic Party	KrF	23,588	8.36%	1	0	1
Red Party	R	15,515	5.50%	1	0	1
Centre Party	Sp	14,083	4.99%	1	0	1
Socialist Left Party	SV	10,400	3.69%	0	1	1
Green Party	MDG	7,753	2.75%	0	0	0
Liberal Party	V	7,453	2.64%	0	0	0
Conservative	K	2,468	0.88%	0	0	0
Industry and Business Party	INP	2,093	0.74%	0	0	0
Pensioners' Party	PP	2,005	0.71%	0	0	0
Norway Democrats	ND	1,959	0.69%	0	0	0
Generation Party	GP	1,672	0.59%	0	0	0
Peace and Justice	FOR	711	0.25%	0	0	0
DNI Party	DNI	479	0.17%	0	0	0
Welfare and Innovation Party	VIP	419	0.15%	0	0	0
Center Party	PS	379	0.13%	0	0	0
Valid votes		282,016	100.00%	13	1	14
Blank votes		2,179	0.77%			
Rejected votes – other		603	0.21%			
Total polled		284,798	81.30%			
Registered electors		350,312				

The following candidates were elected:

- Constituency seats - Pål Morten Borgli (FrP); Julia Eikeland (Ap); Andreas Bjelland Eriksen (Ap); May Helen Hetland Ervik (FrP); Margret Hagerup (H); Ruth Mariann Hop (Ap); Mímir Kristjánsson (R); Rune Midtun (FrP); Geir Pollestad (Sp); Morten Sandanger (Ap); Jonas Andersen Sayed (KrF); Kristoffer Sivertsen (FrP); and Aleksander Stokkebø (H).
- Compensatory seat - Ingrid Fiskaa (SV).

===== 2021 =====
Results of the 2021 parliamentary election held on 13 September 2021:

Party		Votes	%	Seats		
Party		Votes	%	Con.	Com.	Tot.
Conservative Party	H	61,992	23.95%	4	0	4
Labour Party	Ap	57,969	22.39%	3	0	3
Progress Party	FrP	43,382	16.76%	2	0	2
Centre Party	Sp	26,955	10.41%	2	0	2
Christian Democratic Party	KrF	20,859	8.06%	1	0	1
Socialist Left Party	SV	13,261	5.12%	1	0	1
Red Party	R	9,620	3.72%	0	1	1
Liberal Party	V	9,106	3.52%	0	0	0
Green Party	MDG	6,152	2.38%	0	0	0
Democrats in Norway		2,634	1.02%	0	0	0
Industry and Business Party	INP	1,646	0.64%	0	0	0
The Christians	PDK	1,400	0.54%	0	0	0
Pensioners' Party	PP	1,327	0.51%	0	0	0
Center Party		911	0.35%	0	0	0
Health Party		500	0.19%	0	0	0
Capitalist Party		424	0.16%	0	0	0
People's Action No to More Road Tolls	FNB	316	0.12%	0	0	0
Alliance - Alternative for Norway		212	0.08%	0	0	0
Pirate Party of Norway		202	0.08%	0	0	0
Valid votes		258,868	100.00%	13	1	14
Blank votes		1,603	0.61%			
Rejected votes – other		420	0.16%			
Total polled		260,891	78.23%			
Registered electors		333,475				

The following candidates were elected:

- Constituency seats - Olaug Bollestad (KrF); Tina Bru (H); Ingrid Fiskaa (SV); Margret Hagerup (H); Terje Halleland (FrP); Lisa Marie Ness Klungland (Sp); Tove Elise Madland (Ap); Geir Pollestad (Sp); Torstein Tvedt Solberg (Ap); Roy Steffensen (FrP); Sveinung Stensland (H); Aleksander Stokkebø (H); and Hadia Tajik (Ap).
- Compensatory seat - Mímir Kristjánsson (R).

==== 2010s ====
===== 2017 =====
Results of the 2017 parliamentary election held on 11 September 2017:

Party		Votes	%	Seats		
Party		Votes	%	Con.	Com.	Tot.
Conservative Party	H	72,201	28.75%	4	0	4
Labour Party	Ap	56,340	22.44%	4	0	4
Progress Party	FrP	49,451	19.69%	3	0	3
Christian Democratic Party	KrF	21,092	8.40%	1	0	1
Centre Party	Sp	18,897	7.53%	1	0	1
Socialist Left Party	SV	9,895	3.94%	0	1	1
Liberal Party	V	8,851	3.52%	0	0	0
Green Party	MDG	6,444	2.57%	0	0	0
Red Party	R	2,895	1.15%	0	0	0
The Christians	PDK	1,256	0.50%	0	0	0
Pensioners' Party	PP	1,226	0.49%	0	0	0
Capitalist Party		644	0.26%	0	0	0
Health Party		530	0.21%	0	0	0
Pirate Party of Norway		444	0.18%	0	0	0
Coastal Party	KP	248	0.10%	0	0	0
Democrats in Norway		240	0.10%	0	0	0
The Alliance		231	0.09%	0	0	0
Party of Values		148	0.06%	0	0	0
Communist Party of Norway	K	75	0.03%	0	0	0
Valid votes		251,108	100.00%	13	1	14
Blank votes		1,440	0.57%			
Rejected votes – other		414	0.16%			
Total polled		252,962	78.76%			
Registered electors		321,163				

The following candidates were elected:

- Constituency seats - Olaug Bollestad (KrF); Tina Bru (H); Margret Hagerup (H); Terje Halleland (FrP); Øystein Langholm Hansen (Ap); Bent Høie (H); Solveig Horne (FrP); Hege Haukeland Liadal (Ap); Geir Pollestad (Sp); Torstein Tvedt Solberg (Ap); Roy Steffensen (FrP); Sveinung Stensland (H); and Hadia Tajik (Ap).
- Compensatory seat - Solfrid Lerbrekk (SV).

===== 2013 =====
Results of the 2013 parliamentary election held on 8 and 9 September 2013:

Party		Votes	%	Seats		
Party		Votes	%	Con.	Com.	Tot.
Conservative Party	H	72,470	30.12%	4	0	4
Labour Party	Ap	54,462	22.64%	3	0	3
Progress Party	FrP	45,082	18.74%	3	0	3
Christian Democratic Party	KrF	25,585	10.63%	2	0	2
Centre Party	Sp	12,621	5.25%	1	0	1
Liberal Party	V	10,827	4.50%	0	1	1
Socialist Left Party	SV	7,908	3.29%	0	0	0
Green Party	MDG	5,267	2.19%	0	0	0
The Christians	PDK	2,296	0.95%	0	0	0
Pensioners' Party	PP	1,191	0.50%	0	0	0
Red Party	R	1,060	0.44%	0	0	0
Pirate Party of Norway		865	0.36%	0	0	0
Christian Unity Party	KSP	351	0.15%	0	0	0
Liberal People's Party	DLF	226	0.09%	0	0	0
Coastal Party	KP	202	0.08%	0	0	0
Democrats in Norway		115	0.05%	0	0	0
Communist Party of Norway	K	67	0.03%	0	0	0
Valid votes		240,595	100.00%	13	1	14
Blank votes		846	0.35%			
Rejected votes – other		195	0.08%			
Total polled		241,636	78.20%			
Registered electors		308,988				

The following candidates were elected:

- Constituency seats - Olaug Bollestad (KrF); Tina Bru (H); Bent Høie (H); Solveig Horne (FrP); Arve Kambe (H); Hege Haukeland Liadal (Ap); Siri A. Meling (H); Geir Pollestad (Sp); Torstein Tvedt Solberg (Ap); Roy Steffensen (FrP); Eirin Kristin Sund (Ap); Bente Thorsen (FrP); and Geir Toskedal (KrF).
- Compensatory seat - Iselin Nybø (V).

==== 2000s ====
===== 2009 =====
Results of the 2009 parliamentary election held on 13 and 14 September 2009:

Party		Votes	%	Seats		
Party		Votes	%	Con.	Com.	Tot.
Progress Party	FrP	60,030	26.46%	4	0	4
Labour Party	Ap	59,145	26.07%	3	0	3
Conservative Party	H	44,289	19.52%	3	0	3
Christian Democratic Party	KrF	25,541	11.26%	1	0	1
Centre Party	Sp	13,144	5.79%	1	0	1
Socialist Left Party	SV	10,609	4.68%	0	1	1
Liberal Party	V	10,053	4.43%	0	0	0
Pensioners' Party	PP	1,386	0.61%	0	0	0
Red Party	R	908	0.40%	0	0	0
Christian Unity Party	KSP	687	0.30%	0	0	0
Green Party	MDG	571	0.25%	0	0	0
Coastal Party	KP	223	0.10%	0	0	0
Democrats in Norway		128	0.06%	0	0	0
Liberal People's Party	DLF	122	0.05%	0	0	0
Communist Party of Norway	K	61	0.03%	0	0	0
Valid votes		226,897	100.00%	12	1	13
Blank votes		982	0.43%			
Rejected votes – other		180	0.08%			
Total polled		228,059	76.99%			
Registered electors		296,220				

The following candidates were elected:

- Constituency seats - Bent Høie (H); Solveig Horne (FrP); Dagfinn Høybråten (KrF); Arve Kambe (H);Magnhild Meltveit Kleppa (Sp); Siri A. Meling (H); Tore Nordtun (Ap); Torfinn Opheim (Ap); Ketil Solvik-Olsen (FrP); Eirin Kristin Sund (Ap); Bente Thorsen (FrP); and Øyvind Vaksdal (FrP).
- Compensatory seat - Hallgeir H. Langeland (SV).

===== 2005 =====
Results of the 2005 parliamentary election held on 11 and 12 September 2005:

Party		Votes	%	Seats		
Party		Votes	%	Con.	Com.	Tot.
Progress Party	FrP	56,995	26.09%	3	0	3
Labour Party	Ap	53,736	24.60%	3	0	3
Conservative Party	H	33,402	15.29%	2	0	2
Christian Democratic Party	KrF	26,613	12.18%	1	1	2
Liberal Party	V	15,370	7.04%	1	0	1
Centre Party	Sp	13,764	6.30%	1	0	1
Socialist Left Party	SV	13,759	6.30%	1	0	1
Coastal Party	KP	1,213	0.56%	0	0	0
Red Electoral Alliance	RV	1,070	0.49%	0	0	0
Pensioners' Party	PP	858	0.39%	0	0	0
Christian Unity Party	KSP	651	0.30%	0	0	0
Abortion Opponents' List		468	0.21%	0	0	0
Green Party	MDG	287	0.13%	0	0	0
Democrats		214	0.10%	0	0	0
Reform Party		54	0.02%	0	0	0
Valid votes		218,454	100.00%	12	1	13
Blank votes		653	0.30%			
Rejected votes – other		248	0.11%			
Total polled		219,355	77.63%			
Registered electors		282,562				

The following candidates were elected:

- Constituency seats - Bent Høie (H); Solveig Horne (FrP); Dagfinn Høybråten (KrF); Magnhild Meltveit Kleppa (Sp); Gunnar Kvassheim (V); Hallgeir H. Langeland (SV); Tore Nordtun (Ap); Torfinn Opheim (Ap); Ketil Solvik-Olsen (FrP); Eirin Kristin Sund (Ap); Øyvind Vaksdal (FrP); and Finn Martin Vallersnes (H).
- Compensatory seat - Bjørg Tørresdal (KrF).

===== 2001 =====
Results of the 2001 parliamentary election held on 9 and 10 September 2001:

Party		Votes	%	Seats		
Party		Votes	%	Con.	Com.	Tot.
Conservative Party	H	46,918	22.67%	3	0	3
Christian Democratic Party	KrF	39,294	18.99%	2	0	2
Progress Party	FrP	37,650	18.19%	2	0	2
Labour Party	Ap	36,857	17.81%	2	0	2
Socialist Left Party	SV	18,187	8.79%	1	0	1
Centre Party	Sp	10,516	5.08%	0	1	1
Liberal Party	V	9,900	4.78%	0	0	0
Coastal Party	KP	2,285	1.10%	0	0	0
The Political Party	DPP	1,566	0.76%	0	0	0
Red Electoral Alliance	RV	1,179	0.57%	0	0	0
Christian Unity Party	KSP	1,070	0.52%	0	0	0
Popular Action No to More Tolls		692	0.33%	0	0	0
Fatherland Party	FLP	312	0.15%	0	0	0
Green Party	MDG	265	0.13%	0	0	0
Norwegian People's Party	NFP	150	0.07%	0	0	0
Communist Party of Norway	K	94	0.05%	0	0	0
Valid votes		206,935	100.00%	10	1	11
Rejected votes		670	0.32%			
Total polled		207,605	77.07%			
Registered electors		269,371				

The following candidates were elected:

- Constituency seats - Bent Høie (H); Hallgeir H. Langeland (SV); Siri A. Meling (H); Tore Nordtun (Ap); Jan Simonsen (FrP); Oddbjørg Ausdal Starrfelt (Ap); Einar Steensnæs (KrF); Bjørg Tørresdal (KrF); Øyvind Vaksdal (FrP); and Finn Martin Vallersnes (H).
- Compensatory seat - Magnhild Meltveit Kleppa (Sp).

==== 1990s ====
===== 1997 =====
Results of the 1997 parliamentary election held on 15 September 1997:

Party		Votes	%	Seats		
Party		Votes	%	Con.	Com.	Tot.
Labour Party	Ap	57,386	27.65%	3	0	3
Christian Democratic Party	KrF	41,099	19.80%	2	0	2
Progress Party	FrP	38,575	18.59%	2	0	2
Conservative Party	H	29,892	14.40%	2	0	2
Centre Party	Sp	15,600	7.52%	1	0	1
Liberal Party	V	11,648	5.61%	0	1	1
Socialist Left Party	SV	8,297	4.00%	0	1	1
Red Electoral Alliance	RV	1,894	0.91%	0	0	0
Pensioners' Party	PP	1,481	0.71%	0	0	0
Christian Conservative Party	KKP	476	0.23%	0	0	0
Fatherland Party	FLP	441	0.21%	0	0	0
Green Party	MDG	313	0.15%	0	0	0
Children-Elderly		246	0.12%	0	0	0
Natural Law Party		136	0.07%	0	0	0
Communist Party of Norway	K	72	0.03%	0	0	0
Valid votes		207,556	100.00%	10	2	12
Rejected votes		618	0.30%			
Total polled		208,174	80.19%			
Registered electors		259,599				

The following candidates were elected:

- Constituency seats - Jan Johnsen (H); Hilde Frafjord Johnson (KrF); Magnhild Meltveit Kleppa (Sp); Tore Nordtun (Ap); Jan Petter Rasmussen (Ap); Jan Simonsen (FrP); Oddbjørg Ausdal Starrfelt (Ap); Einar Steensnæs (KrF); Inger Stolt-Nielsen (H); and Øyvind Vaksdal (FrP).
- Compensatory seats - Gunnar Kvassheim (V); and Hallgeir H. Langeland (SV).

===== 1993 =====
Results of the 1993 parliamentary election held on 12 and 13 September 1993:

Party		Votes	%	Seats		
Party		Votes	%	Con.	Com.	Tot.
Labour Party	Ap	57,037	29.29%	3	0	3
Centre Party	Sp	34,964	17.95%	2	0	2
Conservative Party	H	31,856	16.36%	2	0	2
Christian Democratic Party	KrF	27,909	14.33%	2	0	2
Progress Party	FrP	15,554	7.99%	1	0	1
Socialist Left Party	SV	12,156	6.24%	0	1	1
Liberal Party	V	8,960	4.60%	0	0	0
Pensioners' Party	PP	2,228	1.14%	0	0	0
Fatherland Party	FLP	2,018	1.04%	0	0	0
Christian Conservative Party	KKP	713	0.37%	0	0	0
New Future Coalition Party	SNF	640	0.33%	0	0	0
Red Electoral Alliance	RV	478	0.25%	0	0	0
Green Party	MDG	225	0.12%	0	0	0
Valid votes		194,738	100.00%	10	1	11
Rejected votes		485	0.25%			
Total polled		195,223	78.26%			
Registered electors		249,445				

The following candidates were elected:

- Constituency seats - Unn Aarrestad (Sp); Gunnar Fatland (H); Hilde Frafjord Johnson (KrF); Magnhild Meltveit Kleppa (Sp); Tore Nordtun (Ap); Magnar Sætre (Ap); Jan Simonsen (FrP); Oddbjørg Ausdal Starrfelt (Ap); Einar Steensnæs (KrF); and Thorhild Widvey (H).
- Compensatory seat - Eilef A. Meland (SV).

==== 1980s ====
===== 1989 =====
Results of the 1989 parliamentary election held on 10 and 11 September 1989:

Party		Votes	%	Seats		
Party		Votes	%	Con.	Com.	Tot.
Labour Party	Ap	53,832	26.68%	3	0	3
Conservative Party	H	44,821	22.21%	2	1	3
Progress Party	FrP	31,072	15.40%	2	0	2
Christian Democratic Party	KrF	29,528	14.63%	1	1	2
Centre Party	Sp	15,340	7.60%	1	0	1
Socialist Left Party	SV	14,552	7.21%	1	0	1
Liberal Party	V	10,452	5.18%	0	0	0
Stop Immigration	SI	1,054	0.52%	0	0	0
County Lists for Environment and Solidarity	FMS	571	0.28%	0	0	0
Green Party	MDG	571	0.28%	0	0	0
Valid votes		201,793	100.00%	10	2	12
Rejected votes		290	0.14%			
Total polled		202,083	85.01%			
Registered electors		237,729				

The following candidates were elected:

- Constituency seats - Gunnar Berge (Ap); Petter Bjørheim (FrP); Gunnar Fatland (H); Eilef A. Meland (SV); Gunn Vigdis Olsen-Hagen (Ap); Magnar Sætre (Ap); Jan Simonsen (FrP); John S. Tveit (KrF); Ole Gabriel Ueland (Sp); and Thorhild Widvey (H).
- Compensatory seats - Sverre Mauritzen (H); and Borghild Røyseland (KrF).

===== 1985 =====
Results of the 1985 parliamentary election held on 8 and 9 September 1985:

Party		Votes	%	Seats
Conservative Party	H	59,524	31.38%	4
Labour Party	Ap	58,702	30.94%	3
Christian Democratic Party	KrF	27,857	14.68%	2
Centre Party	Sp	14,101	7.43%	1
Progress Party	FrP	11,403	6.01%	0
Liberal Party	V	9,786	5.16%	0
Socialist Left Party	SV	6,545	3.45%	0
Liberal People's Party	DLF	1,237	0.65%	0
Red Electoral Alliance	RV	365	0.19%	0
Communist Party of Norway	K	157	0.08%	0
Free Elected Representatives		26	0.01%	0
Valid votes		189,703	100.00%	10
Rejected votes		218	0.11%	
Total polled		189,921	84.44%	
Registered electors		224,907		

The following candidates were elected: Gunnar Berge (Ap); Gunnar Fatland (H); Hans Frette (Ap); Marit Løvvig (H); Sverre Mauritzen (H); Gunn Vigdis Olsen-Hagen (Ap); Borghild Røyseland (KrF); Lars Storhaug (H); John S. Tveit (KrF); and Ole Gabriel Ueland (Sp).

===== 1981 =====
Results of the 1981 parliamentary election held on 13 and 14 September 1981:

Party		Votes	%	Seats
Conservative Party	H	59,997	33.74%	3
Labour Party	Ap	48,121	27.07%	3
Christian Democratic Party	KrF	27,902	15.69%	2
Progress Party	FrP	14,227	8.00%	1
Centre Party	Sp	12,639	7.11%	1
Liberal Party	V	6,614	3.72%	0
Socialist Left Party	SV	6,061	3.41%	0
Liberal People's Party	DLF	1,326	0.75%	0
Red Electoral Alliance	RV	576	0.32%	0
Communist Party of Norway	K	239	0.13%	0
Plebiscite Party		61	0.03%	0
Free Elected Representatives		33	0.02%	0
Valid votes		177,796	100.00%	10
Rejected votes		165	0.09%	
Total polled		177,961	83.97%	
Registered electors		211,924		

The following candidates were elected: Jakob Aano (KrF); Gunnar Berge (Ap); Claus Egil Feyling (H); Hans Frette (Ap); Knut Haus (KrF); Marit Løvvig (H); Sverre Mauritzen (H); Jens Marcussen (FrP); Gunn Vigdis Olsen-Hagen (Ap); and Ole Gabriel Ueland (Sp).

==== 1970s ====
===== 1977 =====
Results of the 1977 parliamentary election held on 11 and 12 September 1977:

Party		Votes	%	Seats
Labour Party	Ap	49,907	31.57%	4
Conservative Party	H	41,186	26.05%	3
Christian Democratic Party	KrF	33,521	21.20%	2
Centre Party	Sp	12,876	8.14%	1
Progress Party	FrP	5,322	3.37%	0
New People's Party	DNF	5,321	3.37%	0
Socialist Left Party	SV	5,171	3.27%	0
Liberal Party	V	3,718	2.35%	0
Red Electoral Alliance	RV	444	0.28%	0
Single Person's Party		228	0.14%	0
Communist Party of Norway	K	226	0.14%	0
Norwegian Democratic Party		129	0.08%	0
Free Elected Representatives		53	0.03%	0
Valid votes		158,102	100.00%	10
Rejected votes		194	0.12%	
Total polled		158,296	83.18%	
Registered electors		190,296		

The following candidates were elected: Jakob Aano (KrF); Gunnar Berge (Ap); Claus Egil Feyling (H); Hans Frette (Ap); Knut Haus (KrF); Geirmund Ihle (Ap); Kristin Kverneland Lønningdal (H); Marit Løvvig (H); Gunn Vigdis Olsen-Hagen (Ap); and Ole Gabriel Ueland (Sp).

===== 1973 =====
Results of the 1973 parliamentary election held on 9 and 10 September 1973:

Party		Votes	%	Seats
Labour Party	Ap	38,041	26.64%	3
Christian Democratic Party	KrF	29,849	20.90%	2
Conservative Party	H	20,944	14.67%	2
Centre Party	Sp	16,693	11.69%	1
Socialist Electoral League	SV	11,740	8.22%	1
Anders Lange's Party	ALP	11,240	7.87%	1
New People's Party	DNF	8,718	6.11%	0
Liberal Party	V	4,672	3.27%	0
Norwegian Democratic Party		280	0.20%	0
Red Electoral Alliance	RV	278	0.19%	0
Single Person's Party		242	0.17%	0
Women's Free Elected Representatives		90	0.06%	0
Valid votes		142,787	100.00%	10
Rejected votes		205	0.14%	
Total polled		142,992	80.13%	
Registered electors		178,456		

The following candidates were elected: Jakob Aano (KrF); Karl Aasland (Sp); Gunnar Berge (Ap); Edvard Magnus Edvardsen (Ap); Erling Erland (ALP); Berge Furre (SV); Knut Haus (KrF); Geirmund Ihle (Ap); Kristin Kverneland Lønningdal (H); and Lauritz Bernhard Sirevaag (H).

==== 1960s ====
===== 1969 =====
Results of the 1969 parliamentary election held on 7 and 8 September 1969:

Party		Votes	%	Seats
Labour Party	Ap	48,649	34.83%	4
Christian Democratic Party	KrF	26,716	19.13%	2
Conservative Party	H	23,848	17.07%	2
Liberal Party	V	19,301	13.82%	1
Centre Party	Sp	16,700	11.96%	1
Socialist People's Party	SF	3,309	2.37%	0
Communist Party of Norway	K	774	0.55%	0
Norwegian Democratic Party		387	0.28%	0
Valid votes		139,684	100.00%	10
Rejected votes		234	0.17%	
Total polled		139,918	83.03%	
Registered electors		168,510		

The following candidates were elected: Jakob Aano (KrF); Karl Aasland (Sp); Gunnar Berge (Ap); Karl J. Brommeland (KrF); Edvard Magnus Edvardsen (Ap); Egil Endresen (H); Ingvar Lars Helle (V); Geirmund Ihle (Ap); Peder P. Næsheim (Ap); and Lauritz Bernhard Sirevaag (H).

===== 1965 =====
Results of the 1965 parliamentary election held on 12 and 13 September 1965:

Party		Votes	%	Seats
Labour Party	Ap	43,020	32.58%	3
Conservative Party	H	23,510	17.80%	2
Liberal Party	V	23,394	17.72%	2
Christian Democratic Party	KrF	20,895	15.82%	2
Centre Party	Sp	15,053	11.40%	1
Socialist People's Party	SF	5,112	3.87%	0
Communist Party of Norway	K	876	0.66%	0
Norwegian Democratic Party		194	0.15%	0
Valid votes		132,054	100.00%	10
Rejected votes		394	0.30%	
Total polled		132,448	85.56%	
Registered electors		154,798		

The following candidates were elected: Jakob Aano (KrF); Karl J. Brommeland (KrF); Edvard Magnus Edvardsen (Ap); Egil Endresen (H); Ingolv Helland (V); Gunnar Fredrik Hellesen (H); Sunniva Hakestad Møller (Ap); Peder P. Næsheim (Ap); Inga Lovise Tusvik (V); and Bjarne Undheim (Sp).

===== 1961 =====
Results of the 1961 parliamentary election held on 11 September 1961:

Party		Votes	%	Seats
Labour Party	Ap	41,995	36.08%	3
Conservative Party	H	20,556	17.66%	2
Liberal Party	V	20,142	17.31%	2
Christian Democratic Party	KrF	18,843	16.19%	2
Centre Party	Sp	12,924	11.10%	1
Communist Party of Norway	K	1,922	1.65%	0
Wild Votes		1	0.00%	0
Valid votes		116,383	100.00%	10
Rejected votes		614	0.52%	
Total polled		116,997	78.71%	
Registered electors		148,651		

The following candidates were elected: Ole Bergesen (H), 20,538 votes; Kjell Bondevik (KrF), 18,842 votes; Karl J. Brommeland (KrF), 18,840 votes; Trond Hegna (Ap), 41,991 votes; Ingolv Helland (V), 20,130 votes; Gunnar Fredrik Hellesen (H), 20,555 votes; Sunniva Hakestad Møller (Ap), 41,983 votes; Lars Ramndal (V), 20,127 votes; Jakob Martinus Remseth (Ap), 41,992 votes; and Bjarne Undheim (Sp), 12,913 votes.

==== 1950s ====
===== 1957 =====
Results of the 1957 parliamentary election held on 7 October 1957:

Party		Votes	%	Seats
Labour Party	Ap	41,220	36.72%	3
Liberal Party	V	20,700	18.44%	2
Christian Democratic Party	KrF	18,060	16.09%	2
Conservative Party	H	17,971	16.01%	2
Farmers' Party	Bp	12,382	11.03%	1
Communist Party of Norway	K	1,916	1.71%	0
Valid votes		112,249	100.00%	10
Rejected votes		455	0.40%	
Total polled		112,704	77.47%	
Registered electors		145,480		

The following candidates were elected: Ole Bergesen (H); Kjell Bondevik (KrF); Karl J. Brommeland (KrF); Trond Hegna (Ap); Paul Ingebretsen (V); Peter Torleivson Molaug (H); Sunniva Hakestad Møller (Ap); Lars Ramndal (V); Jakob Martinus Remseth (Ap); and Lars Elisæus Vatnaland (Bp).

===== 1953 =====
Results of the 1953 parliamentary election held on 12 October 1953:

Party		Votes	%	Seats
Labour Party	Ap	40,544	36.18%	3
Liberal Party	V	19,838	17.70%	2
Christian Democratic Party	KrF	18,105	16.15%	2
Conservative Party	H	17,666	15.76%	2
Farmers' Party	Bp	13,178	11.76%	1
Communist Party of Norway	K	2,744	2.45%	0
Wild Votes		1	0.00%	0
Valid votes		112,076	100.00%	10
Rejected votes		518	0.46%	
Total polled		112,594	79.97%	
Registered electors		140,803		

The following candidates were elected: Ole Bergesen (H); Kjell Bondevik (KrF); Trond Hegna (Ap); Ivar Kristiansen Hognestad (Ap); Paul Ingebretsen (V); Peter Torleivson Molaug (H); Lars Ramndal (V); Jakob Martinus Remseth (Ap); Lars Elisæus Vatnaland (Bp); and Endre Kristian Vestvik (KrF).

==== 1940s ====
===== 1949 =====
Results of the 1949 parliamentary election held on 10 October 1949:

Party		Votes	%	Seats
Labour Party	Ap	19,900	28.82%	2
Conservative Party and Farmers' Party	H-Bp	19,097	27.66%	1
Liberal Party	V	17,711	25.65%	1
Christian Democratic Party	KrF	10,406	15.07%	1
Communist Party of Norway	K	1,218	1.76%	0
Society Party	Samfp	716	1.04%	0
Valid votes		69,048	100.00%	5
Rejected votes		453	0.65%	
Total polled		69,501	80.20%	
Registered electors		86,663		

The following candidates were elected: Kjell Bondevik (KrF); Ivar Kristiansen Hognestad (Ap); Lars Ramndal (V); Jakob Martinus Remseth (Ap); and Lars Elisæus Vatnaland (H-Bp).

===== 1945 =====
Results of the 1945 parliamentary election held on 8 October 1945:

Party		Party			List Alliance		
Party		Votes	%	Seats	Votes	%	Seats
Labour Party	Ap	16,737	29.12%	2	16,737	29.12%	2
Liberal Party	V	15,603	27.15%	2	15,603	27.15%	1
Farmers' Party	Bp	8,767	15.25%	1	15,711	27.34%	2
Conservative Party	H	6,947	12.09%	0	15,711	27.34%	2
Christian Democratic Party	KrF	7,160	12.46%	0	7,160	12.46%	0
Communist Party of Norway	K	2,262	3.94%	0	2,262	3.94%	0
Valid votes		57,476	100.00%	5	57,473	100.00%	5
Rejected votes		369	0.64%				
Total polled		57,845	74.84%				
Registered electors		77,294					

As the list alliance was entitled to more seats contesting as an alliance than it was contesting as individual parties, the distribution of seats was as list alliance votes. The H-Bp list alliance's additional seat was allocated to the Conservative Party.

The following candidates were elected: Ivar Kristiansen Hognestad (Ap); Lars Ramndal (V); Jakob Martinus Remseth (Ap); Lars Elisæus Vatnaland (Bp); and Torkell Vinje (H).

==== 1930s ====
===== 1936 =====
Results of the 1936 parliamentary election held on 19 October 1936:

Party		Party			List Alliance		
Party		Votes	%	Seats	Votes	%	Seats
Liberal Party	V	18,626	35.05%	2	18,626	35.05%	2
Conservative Party	H	11,707	22.03%	1	22,265	39.38%	2
Farmers' Party	Bp	10,569	19.89%	1	22,265	39.38%	2
Labour Party	Ap	9,898	18.62%	1	9,898	18.62%	1
Society Party	Samfp	1,869	3.52%	0	1,869	3.52%	0
Nasjonal Samling	NS	478	0.90%	0	478	0.90%	0
Valid votes		53,147	100.00%	5	53,136	100.00%	5
Rejected votes		251	0.47%				
Total polled		53,398	84.60%				
Registered electors		63,115					

As the list alliance was not entitled to more seats contesting as an alliance than it was contesting as individual parties, the distribution of seats was as party votes.

The following candidates were elected: Kristian Edland (V); Ivar Kristiansen Hognestad (Ap); Karl K. Kleppe (V); Nils M. Kverneland (Bp); and Torkell Vinje (H).

===== 1933 =====
Results of the 1933 parliamentary election held on 16 October 1933:

Party		Party			List Alliance		
Party		Votes	%	Seats	Votes	%	Seats
Liberal Party	V	13,089	29.53%	2	15,845	35.75%	2
Rogaland Liberal Left	LV	2,757	6.22%	0	15,845	35.75%	2
Farmers' Party	Bp	12,879	29.06%	1	12,879	29.06%	1
Labour Party	Ap	8,465	19.10%	1	8,465	19.10%	1
Conservative Party	H	6,933	15.64%	1	6,933	15.64%	1
Communist Party of Norway	K	195	0.44%	0	195	0.44%	0
Valid votes		44,318	100.00%	5	44,317	100.00%	5
Rejected votes		281	0.63%				
Total polled		44,599	76.25%				
Registered electors		58,493					

As the list alliance was not entitled to more seats contesting as an alliance than it was contesting as individual parties, the distribution of seats was as party votes.

The following candidates were elected: Kristian Edland (V); Ivar Kristiansen Hognestad (Ap); Karl K. Kleppe (V); Nils M. Kverneland (Bp); and Torkell Vinje (H).

===== 1930 =====
Results of the 1930 parliamentary election held on 20 October 1930:

Party		Votes	%	Seats
Liberal Party	V	16,448	37.12%	2
Farmers' Party	Bp	14,351	32.39%	2
Conservative Party and Free-minded Liberal Party	H-FV	7,927	17.89%	1
Labour Party	Ap	5,381	12.15%	0
Communist Party of Norway	K	199	0.45%	0
Valid votes		44,306	100.00%	5
Rejected votes		209	0.47%	
Total polled		44,515	80.70%	
Registered electors		55,161		

The following candidates were elected: Hans Aarstad (V); Karl K. Kleppe (V); Nils M. Kverneland (Bp); Otto Georg Jahn Reimers (Bp); and Torkell Vinje (H-FV).

==== 1920s ====
===== 1927 =====
Results of the 1927 parliamentary election held on 17 October 1927:

Party		Votes	%	Seats
Liberal Party	V	11,283	34.00%	2
Farmers' Party	Bp	11,061	33.33%	2
Labour Party	Ap	5,736	17.28%	1
Conservative Party and Free-minded Liberal Party	H-FV	5,107	15.39%	0
Valid votes		33,187	100.00%	5
Rejected votes		331	0.99%	
Total polled		33,518	62.59%	
Registered electors		53,551		

The following candidates were elected: Hans Aarstad (V); Emil Aase (Ap); Karl K. Kleppe (V); Nils M. Kverneland (Bp); and Otto Georg Jahn Reimers (Bp).

===== 1924 =====
Results of the 1924 parliamentary election held on 21 October 1924:

Party		Votes	%	Seats
Liberal Party	V	15,138	47.86%	3
Conservative Party and Free-minded Liberal Party	H-FV	6,532	20.65%	1
Farmers' Party	Bp	6,449	20.39%	1
Labour Party	Ap	2,058	6.51%	0
Social Democratic Labour Party of Norway	S	1,216	3.84%	0
Communist Party of Norway	K	235	0.74%	0
Wild Votes		1	0.00%	0
Valid votes		31,629	100.00%	5
Rejected votes		367	1.15%	
Total polled		31,996	62.52%	
Registered electors		51,177		

The following candidates were elected: Hans Aarstad (V); Jacob Kristensen Austbø (V); Jakob Svendsen Gimre (H-FV); Karl K. Kleppe (V); and Nils M. Kverneland (Bp).

===== 1921 =====
Results of the 1921 parliamentary election held on 24 October 1921:

Party		Votes	%	Seats
Liberal Party	V	15,393	50.03%	3
Norwegian Farmers' Association	L	7,355	23.90%	1
Conservative Party and Moderate Party	H-M	4,224	13.73%	1
Labour Party	Ap	2,287	7.43%	0
Social Democratic Labour Party of Norway	S	1,498	4.87%	0
Wild Votes		12	0.04%	0
Valid votes		30,769	100.00%	5
Rejected votes		331	1.06%	
Total polled		31,100	60.67%	
Registered electors		51,261		

The following candidates were elected: Hans Aarstad (V); Torjus Larsen Gard (V); Jakob Svendsen Gimre (H-M); Karl K. Kleppe (V); and Otto Georg Jahn Reimers (L).
