= Borgli =

Borgli is a surname. Notable people with the surname include:

- Kristoffer Borgli (born 1985), Norwegian film director and screenwriter
- Pål Morten Borgli (born 1967), Norwegian politician
- Stine Borgli (born 1990), Norwegian racing cyclist
- Vanessa Borgli (born 1972), Norwegian actress
