= Tusvik (surname) =

Tusvik is a Norwegian surname. Notable people with the surname include:

- Inga Lovise Tusvik (1914–1992), Norwegian politician
- Marit Tusvik (born 1951), Norwegian author
- Sigrid Bonde Tusvik (born 1980), Norwegian television presenter
