= Øyvind Vaksdal =

Norwegian politician (born 1955)

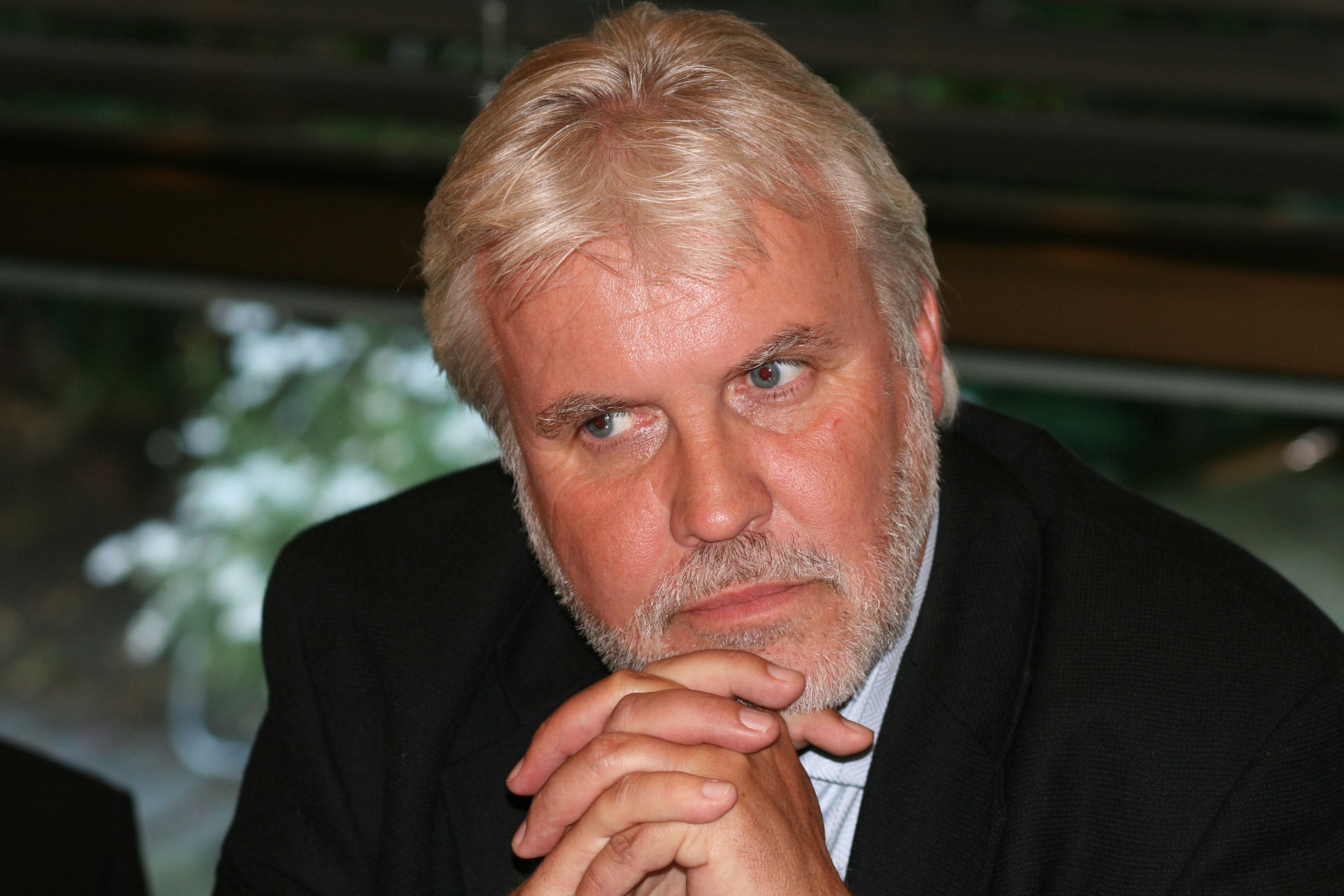
Øyvind Vaksdal in August 2007

Øyvind Vaksdal (born 19 October 1955 in Kopervik) is a Norwegian politician for the Progress Party.

He was elected to the Norwegian Parliament from Rogaland in 1997, and has been re-elected on two occasions. He had previously served in the position of deputy representative during the term 1993–1997.

Vaksdal was a member of the municipal council of Karmøy Municipality from 1983 to 1987 and 1991 to 2007. From 1995 to 1997 he was also a member of Rogaland county council.
