= Erling Erland =

Norwegian politician

Member of Parliament for Rogaland
- In office 10 September 1973 – 12 September 1977

Personal details
- Born: 12 July 1917 Time Municipality, Norway
- Died: 13 January 1988 (aged 70)
- Party: Anders Lange's Party

Erling Erland (12 July 1917 – 13 January 1988) was a Norwegian politician and Member of Parliament for Anders Lange's Party.

Erland was born in Time Municipality. He started as a student in 1937, and was educated as an engineer from the Norwegian Institute of Technology in 1943. He worked for Erlands Maskin in Bryne from 1943 to 1952, and since then worked as a teacher, and later lector, for the Technical School of Stavanger.

He was editor of the Anders Lange's Party electoral newspaper, Anders in 1973. He was elected to the Norwegian Parliament from Rogaland in 1973 where he sat until 1977.
