= Bente Thorsen =

Norwegian politician

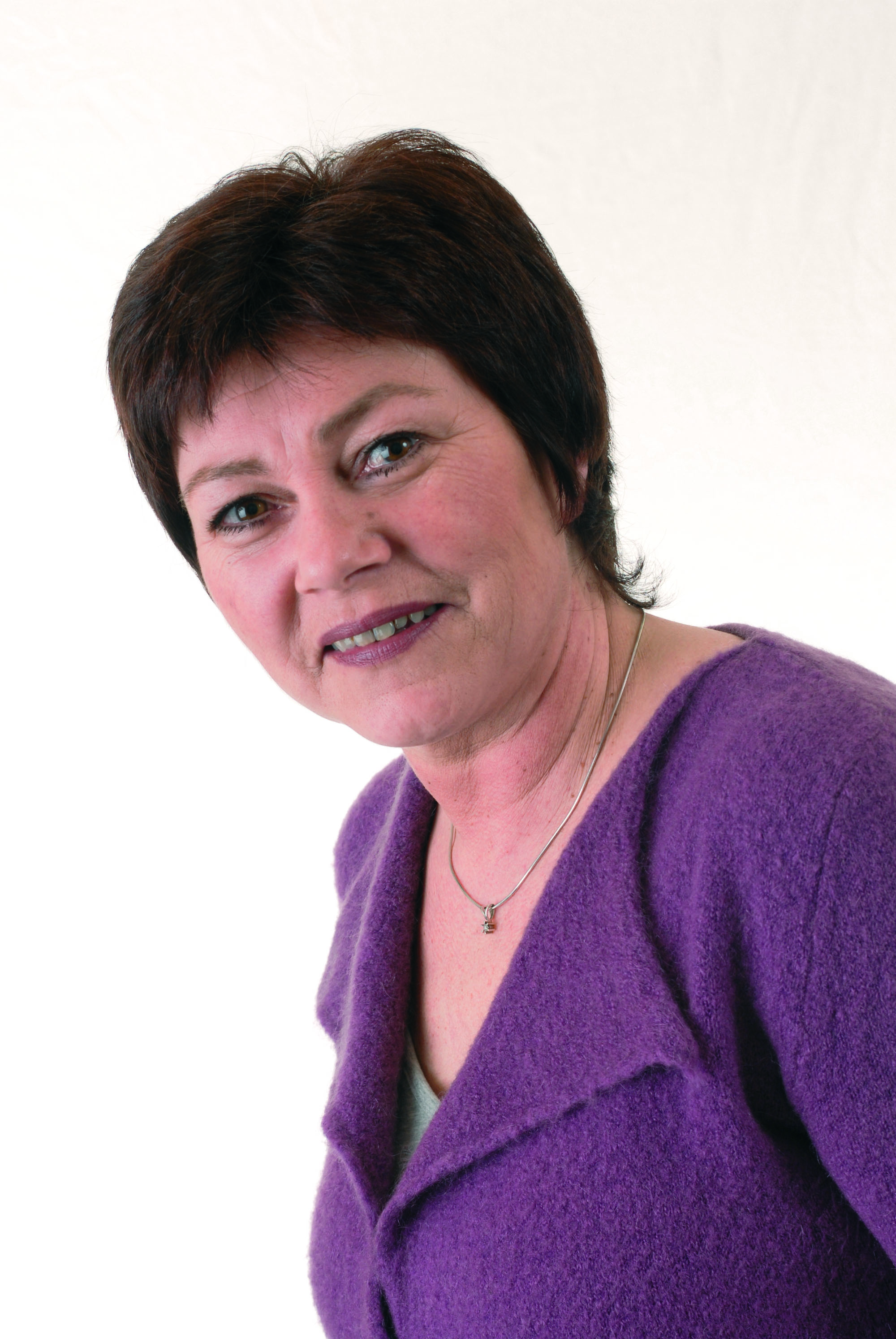

Member of Parliament for Rogaland
- Incumbent
- Assumed office 14 September 2009

Personal details
- Born: 31 October 1958 (age 67) Karmøy, Norway
- Party: Progress Party
- Children: Two
- Occupation: Politician
- Profession: Hairdresser

Bente Thorsen (born 31 October 1958 in Karmøy) is a Norwegian politician representing the Progress Party. She has been a member of the Storting since following the 2009 parliamentary election as Rogaland's 12th representative. She was a deputy representative between 2005 and 2009.

Prior to her election to parliament, Thorsen was a member of the Karmøy municipality council from 1987, and also a member of the formannskap between 1995 and 2009. She has been a member of the Rogaland county council between 1991 and 1995, and again between 1999 and 2003.

Ahead of the 2009 election, Thorsen was nominated as the Progress Party's fourth candidate on the Rogaland ballot. Following the election there was some confusion about the result because of a calculation error at Statistics Norway which showed that Karmøy mayor Kjell Arvid Svendsen (KrF) had won the 12th seat instead of Thorsen. When this was corrected, it turned out that Thorsen had won the seat and that Svendsen was out.

After finishing grade school in 1974, Thorsen entered the Bergeland vocational school to train as a hairdresser. This was her profession until 2009.
