= Gunnar Fatland =

Norwegian politician

Gunnar Fatland (born 9 November 1946 in Kvinnherad Municipality) is a Norwegian politician for the Conservative Party.

He was elected to the Norwegian Parliament from Rogaland in 1985, and was re-elected on two occasions.

On the local level Fatland was mayor of Strand Municipality during the term 1979–1983, and then became a member of the executive committee of Strand municipality council from 1983 to 1987. From 1983 to 1987 he was also a deputy member of Rogaland county council.

Outside politics he mainly worked as a banker. He was a member of various public boards and committees, and of the local sports club in Tau.
