= Torkell Vinje =

Norwegian politician

Torkell Vinje (21 October 1879 – 2 May 1955) was a Norwegian politician for the Conservative Party.

He was elected to the Norwegian Parliament from Rogaland in 1931, and was re-elected on three occasions. He had previously served as a deputy representative during the term 1925–1927.

On the local level he was a member of the municipal council for Skudenes Municipality from 1925 to 1934.

Born in Ullensvang Municipality, he was the son of former government minister Aasmund Halvorsen Vinje (1851-1917) and his wife Borghild (1853-1908), née Fostvedt. Outside politics he worked mainly as the bailiff in Skudenes.
