= Jakob Martinus Remseth =

Norwegian politician

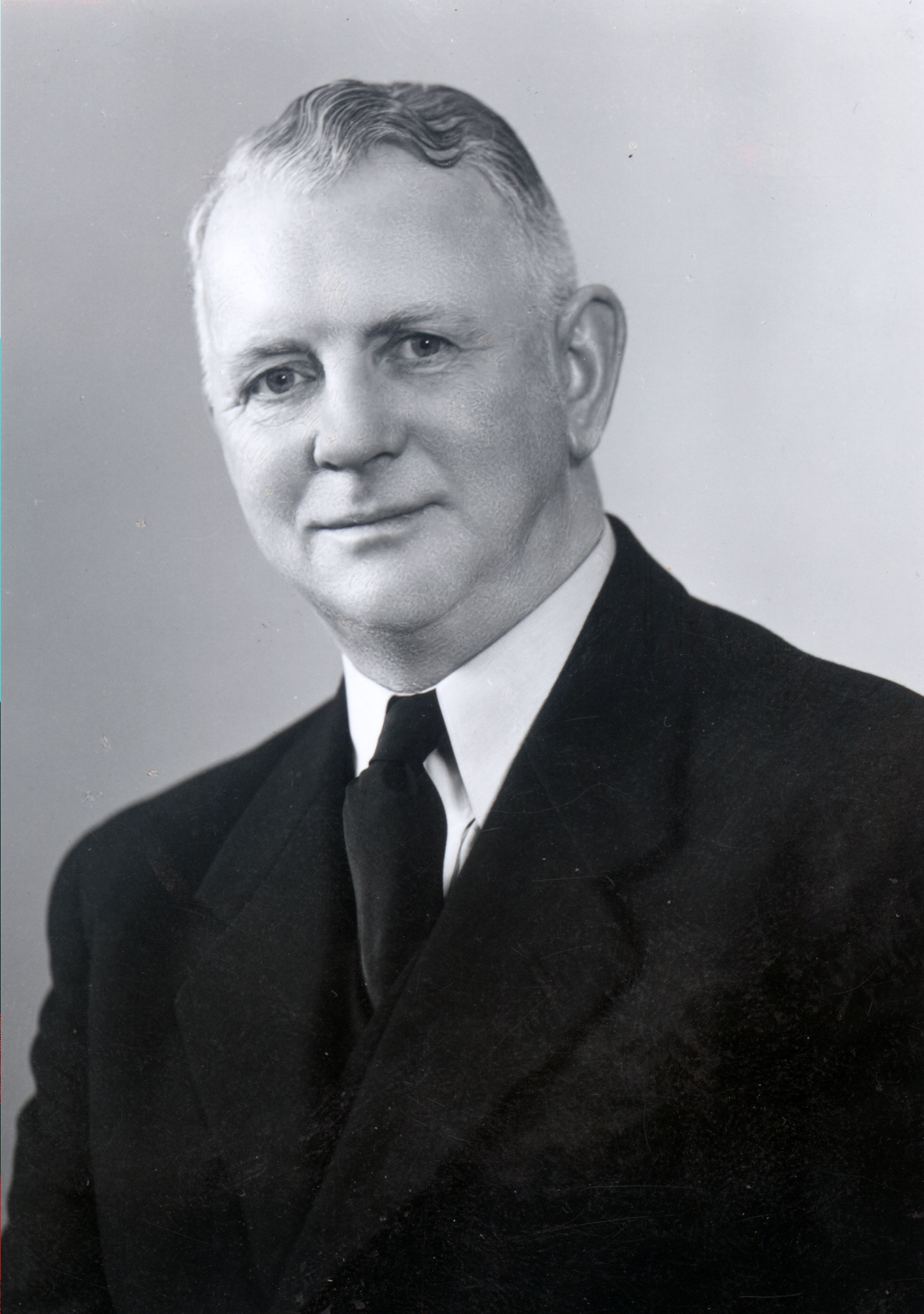
Jakob Martinus Remseth

Jakob Martinus Remseth (5 October 1897 – 4 May 1969) was a Norwegian politician for the Labour Party.

He was born in Dønnes Municipality.

He was elected to the Norwegian Parliament from Rogaland in 1945, and was re-elected on four occasions. He had previously been a deputy representative in the period 1937–1945.

Remseth was mayor of Sauda Municipality during the terms 1937–1941, 1945–1947 and 1947–1951.
