= Terje Halleland =

Norwegian politician (born 1966)

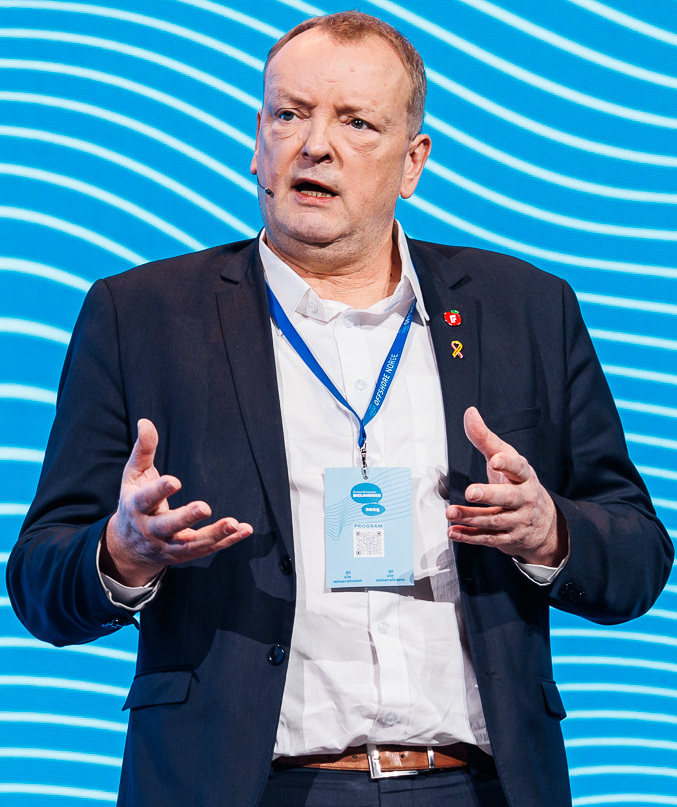

Member of the Storting
- In office 1 October 2017 – 30 September 2025
- Constituency: Rogaland

Deputy County Mayor of Rogaland
- In office 25 October 2011 – 27 October 2015
- County Mayor: Janne Johnsen
- Preceded by: Ellen Solheim
- Succeeded by: Marianne Chesak

Deputy Member of the Storting
- In office 1 October 2005 – 30 September 2013
- Constituency: Rogaland

Personal details
- Born: 14 April 1966 (age 59) Ølen Municipality, Hordaland, Norway
- Party: Progress
- Occupation: Builder; Politician

Terje Halleland (born 14 April 1966) is a Norwegian builder and politician from the Progress Party. He served as a member of parliament for Rogaland from 2017 to 2025. He previously served as a deputy representative between 2005 and 2013.

== Political career ==
=== Local politics ===
Halleland was a member of the Rogaland County Council between 2007 and 2019. He also served as deputy county mayor from 2011 to 2015 under Janne Johnsen. Following the 2015 local elections, he was succeeded by Marianne Chesak.

=== Parliament ===
Halleland was elected as a deputy representative from Rogaland at the 2005 parliamentary election and was re-elected in 2009, serving until 2013.

He was elected as a regular representative from Rogaland at the 2017 election, and was re-elected in 2021. In parliament, he was a member of the Standing Committee on Energy and the Environment between 2017 and 2021. Between 2021 and 2022, he sat on the Standing Committee on Transport and Communications, also serving as its first vice chair. He then returned to the Standing Committee on Energy and the Environment.

In January 2024, both he and fellow parliamentarian Roy Steffensen announced that they wouldn't seek re-election at the 2025 election.

=== Government ===
Halleland was appointed state secretary to Minister of Agriculture and Food Jon Georg Dale on 15 April 2016. He held the position until 30 April 2017.
