= Eirin Kristin Sund =

Norwegian politician (born 1967)

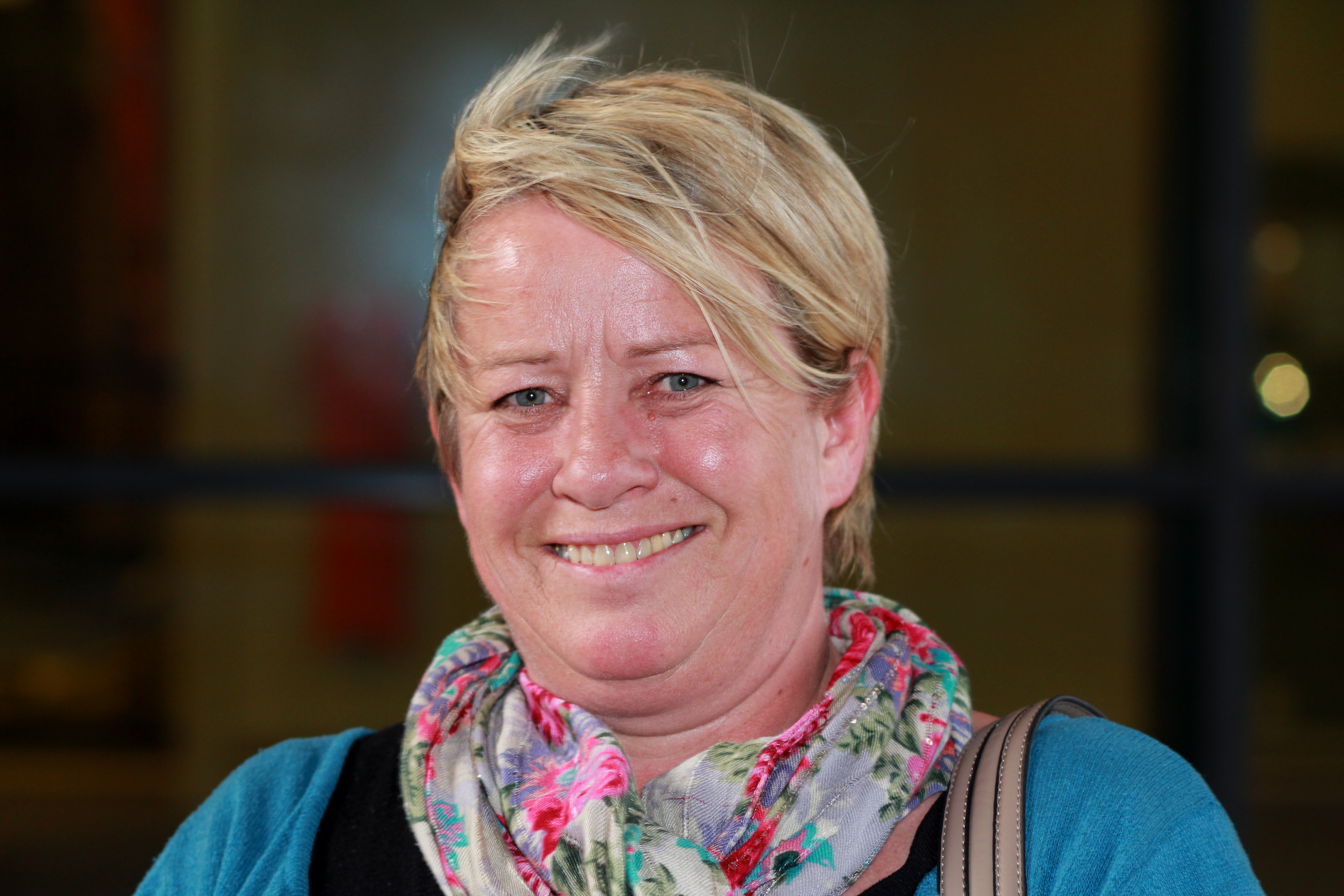
Eirin Kristin Sund

Eirin Kristin Sund (born 6 April 1967 in Brønnøysund) is a Norwegian politician for the Labour Party.

She was elected to the Norwegian Parliament from Rogaland in 2005. She had previously served in the position of deputy representative during the term 2001–2005.

Sund held various positions on the municipal council for Gjesdal Municipality from 1987 to 2003, serving as deputy mayor from 1995 to 1999. From 2003 to 2005 she was the deputy county mayor of Rogaland.

During the cabinet Jagland she was appointed political advisor in the Ministry of the Environment. Between 2000 and 2001, during the first cabinet Stoltenberg, she was appointed State Secretary in the Ministry of Transport and Communications.
