= Roy Steffensen =

Norwegian politician

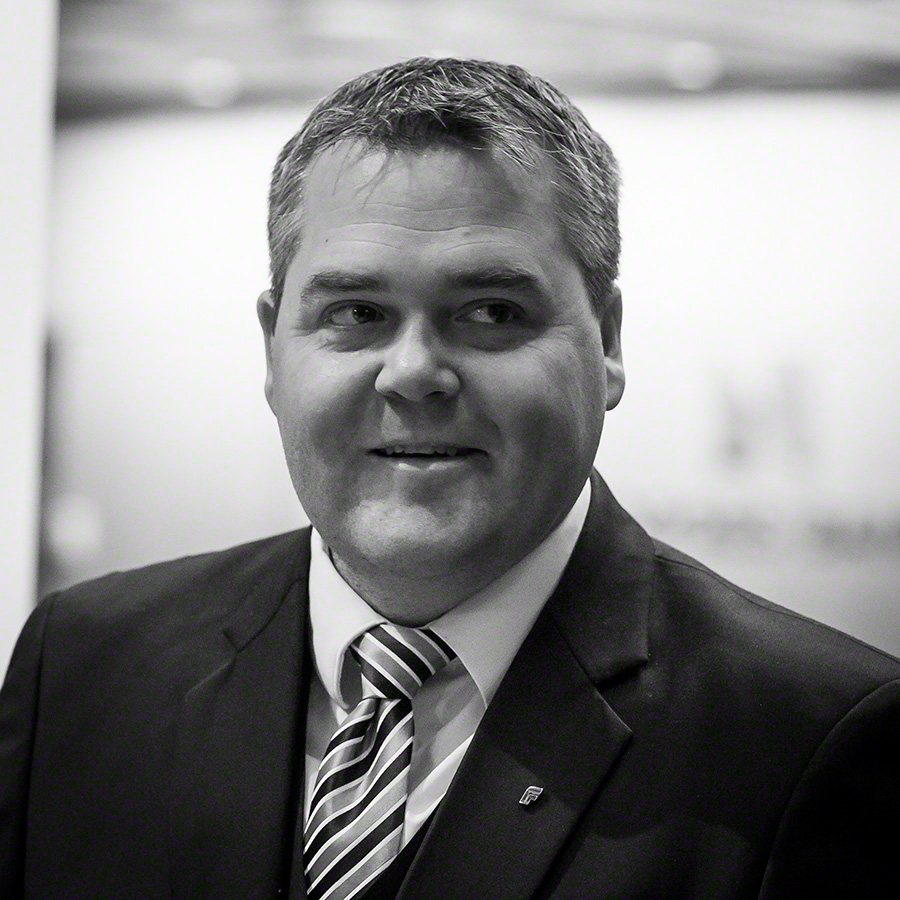
- Steffensen in 2016

Member of the Storting
- In office 1 October 2013 – 30 September 2025
- Constituency: Rogaland

Personal details
- Born: 10 September 1980 (age 46)
- Party: Progress
- Spouse: Hayley Anita Henriksen
- Occupation: Politician

Roy Steffensen (born 10 September 1980) is a Norwegian politician for the Progress Party. He served as a member of parliament for Rogaland from 2013 to 2025.

== Political career ==
=== Parliament ===
Steffensen was elected to the Storting, Norway's parliament, at the 2013 election. He has been re-elected since. In parliament, he sat on the Standing Committee on Transport and Communications between 2013 and 2015. He then sat on the Standing Committee on Finance between 2015 and 2017. That same year he became chair of the Standing Committee on Education and Research, a position he held until 2021. He returned to the Standing Committee on Finance in 2021.

In January 2024, both he and fellow parliamentarian Terje Halleland announced that they wouldn't seek re-election at the 2025 election.

== Personal life ==
Steffensen is married to Hayley Anita Henriksen.
