= Oddbjørg Ausdal Starrfelt =

Norwegian politician

Oddbjørg Ausdal Starrfelt (born 22 July 1948 in Klepp Municipality) is a Norwegian politician for the Labour Party.

She was elected to the Norwegian Parliament from Rogaland in 1993, and was re-elected on two occasions.

Starrfelt was a member of the municipal council of Klepp Municipality from 1983 to 1984, and of Rogaland county council from 1991 to 1993.
