= Morten Sandanger =

Norwegian politician (born 1997)

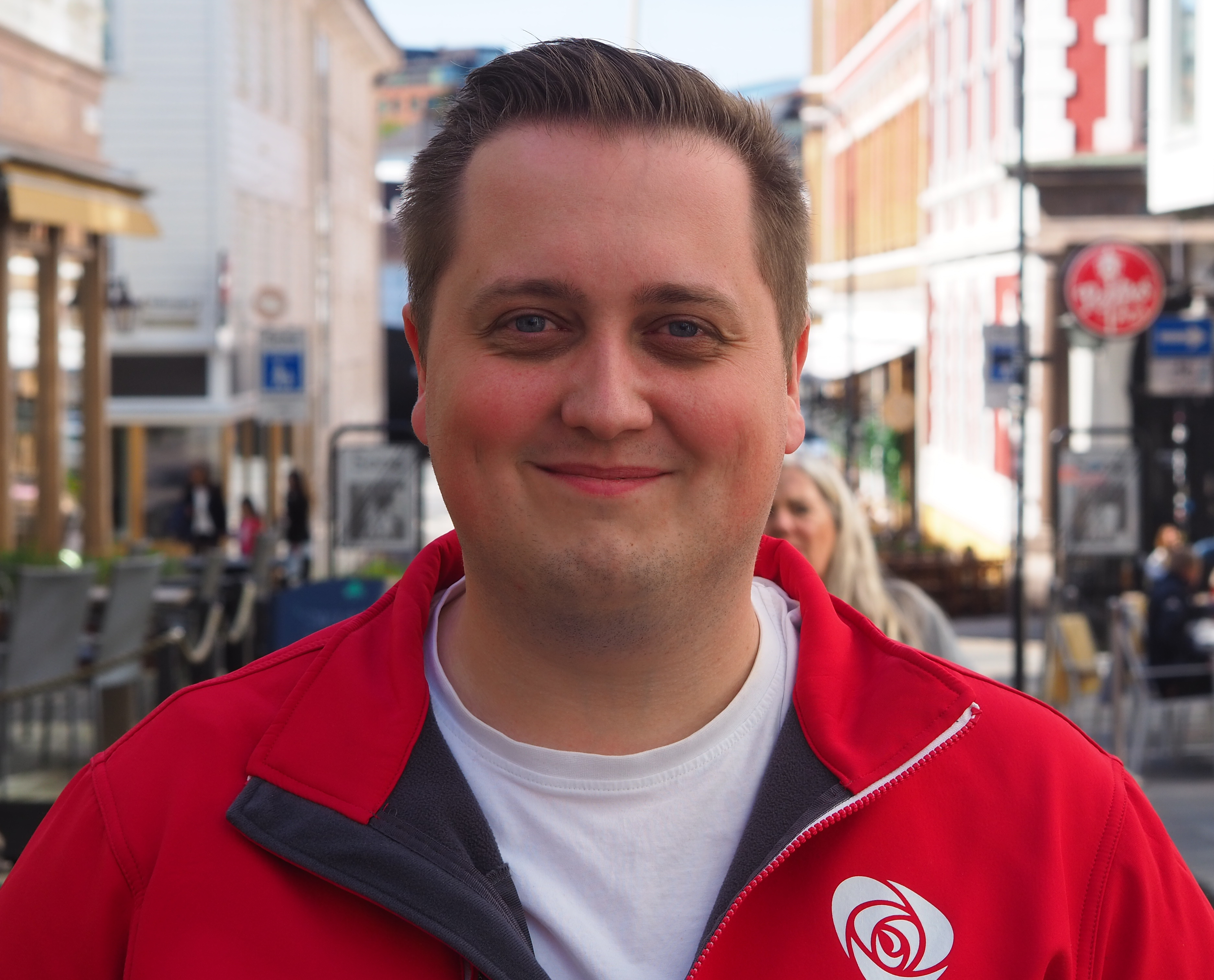
- Sandanger in 2025

Member of the Storting
- Incumbent
- Assumed office 1 October 2025
- Constituency: Rogaland

Personal details
- Born: 30 March 1997 (age 29)
- Party: Labour Party

Morten Sandanger (born 30 March 1997) is a Norwegian politician who was elected member of the Storting in 2025. He is the secretary of the United Federation of Trade Unions' youth wing in Rogaland and Agder.
