= Borghild Røyseland =

Norwegian politician (1926–2020)

- Born: 23 August 1926; Kvinesdal Municipality, Norway
- Died: 13 July 2020 (aged 93)
- Occupation: Politician

Borghild Røyseland (23 August 1926 – 13 July 2020) was a Norwegian politician.

She was born in Kvinesdal Municipality to Ånen Jerstad and Bertine Marie Gjelmestad, and settled in Sandnes. She was elected representative to the Storting for the period 1985–1989 for the Christian Democratic Party, from the constituency of Rogaland. She was reelected for the period 1989–1993.

From 1985 to 1989 she was a member of the Enlarged Committee on Foreign and Constitutional Affairs and the Standing Committee on Consumer Affairs and Administration. From 1989 to 1993 she was a member of the Standing Committee on Social Affairs.

She died on 13 July 2020, at the age of 93.
