= Julia Eikeland =

Norwegian politician (born 2000)

Member of the Storting
- Incumbent
- Assumed office 1 October 2025
- Constituency: Rogaland

Personal details
- Born: 9 August 2000 (age 26)
- Party: Labour Party (since 2015)

Julia Eikeland (born 9 August 2000) is a Norwegian politician who was elected member of the Storting in 2025. She is a member of the county council of Rogaland.
