= Margret Hagerup =

Norwegian politician (born 1980)

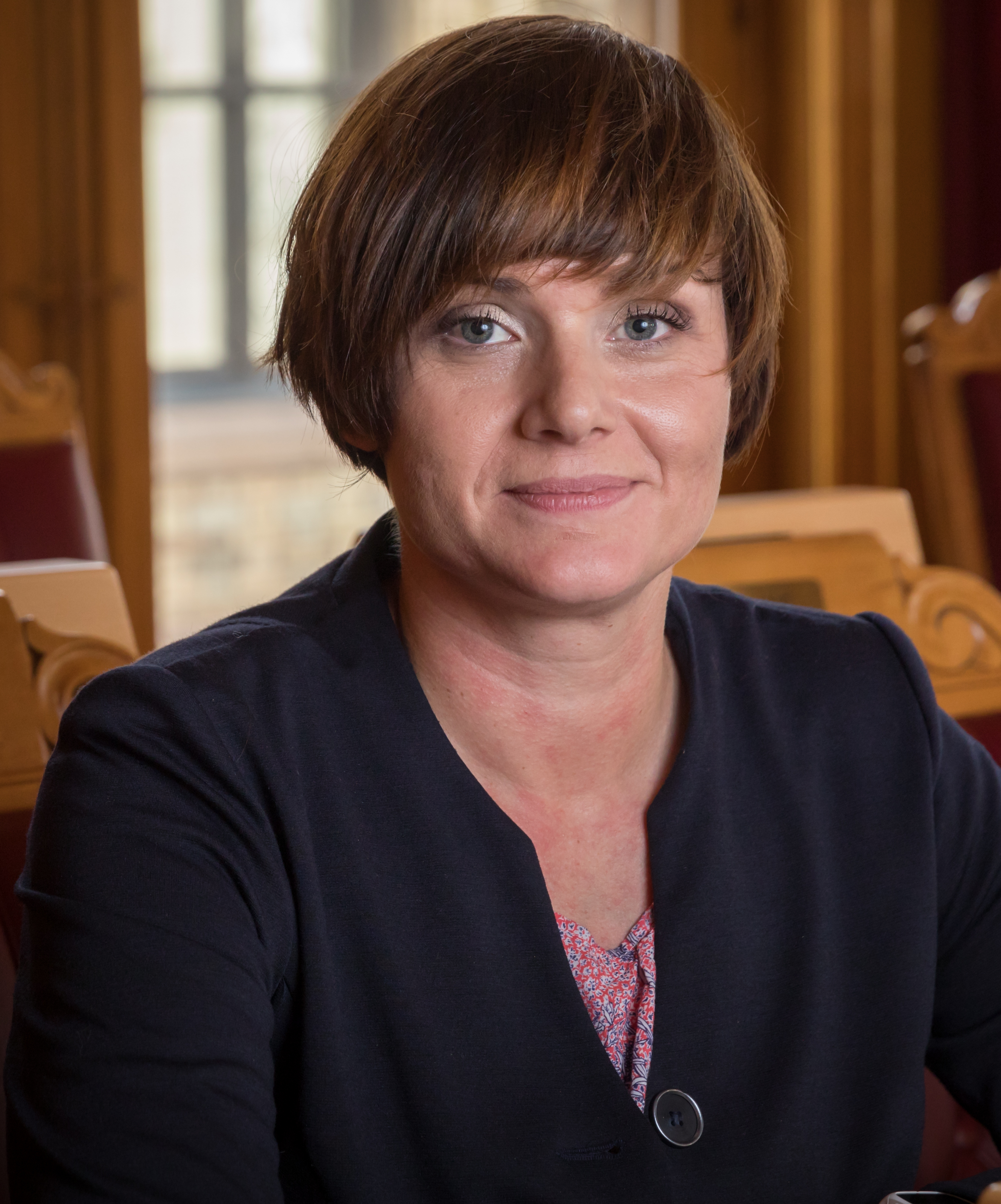
- Margret Hagerup in 2017

Member of the Storting
- Incumbent
- Assumed office 1 October 2017
- Constituency: Rogaland

Personal details
- Born: 8 June 1980 (age 46) Time Municipality, Norway
- Party: Conservative
- Education: University of Stavanger
- Occupation: Politician

Margret Hagerup (born 8 June 1980) is a Norwegian politician for the Conservative Party. She has been a member of the Storting since 2017.

== Biography ==
Hagerup was born in Time Municipality on 8 June 1980, and is the daughter of Frode Hagerup and Kristin Haller Kverneland. She graduated with a degree in change management from the University of Stavanger.

She was elected representative to the Storting for the period 2017–2021 for the Conservative Party from the constituency of Rogaland. She was reelected for the period 2021 to 2025.

In the Storting, she was a member of the Standing Committee on Labour and Social Affairs from 2017 to 2021, and a member of the Standing Committee on Education and Research from 2021 to 2025. She was a member of the Standing Committee on Health and Care Services from 2025.
