= Ivar Kristiansen Hognestad =

Norwegian politician (1888–1973)

Ivar Kristiansen Hognestad (16 October 1888 – 30 April 1973) was a Norwegian politician for the Labour Party.

He was born in Time Municipality. He was elected to the Norwegian Parliament from Rogaland in 1934, and was re-elected on four occasions.

Hognestad held various positions on the municipal council of Time Municipality in the periods 1919–1922, 1928–1940 and 1947–1952.
