= Knut Haus =

Norwegian politician

Knut Haus (8 June 1915 – 23 June 2006) was a Norwegian politician for the Christian Democratic Party.

He was elected to the Norwegian Parliament from Rogaland in 1973, and was re-elected on two occasions. He had previously served in the position of deputy representative during the terms 1961–1965, 1965–1969 and 1969–1973. During his first term as deputy representative he briefly sat as a regular representative, replacing Kjell Bondevik who was appointed to the short-lived cabinet Lyng.

He was born in Greipstad Municipality. Later, Haus was a member of the municipal council of Klepp Municipality during the terms 1959–1963 and 1963–1967, and served as deputy mayor from 1971 to 1973. He headed the county party chapter from 1964 to 1969.
