= Unn Aarrestad =

Norwegian politician (born 1938)

Member of the Storting
- In office 1993–1997
- Constituency: Rogaland

Deputy member of the Storting
- In office: 1981–1993; 1997–2001

Personal details
- Born: June 23, 1938 (age 87) Klepp Municipality, Norway
- Party: Centre Party
- Profession: Farmer

Unn Aarrestad (born 23 June 1938 in Klepp Municipality) is a Norwegian politician for the Centre Party.

== Career ==
She was elected to the Norwegian Parliament from Rogaland in 1993, but was not re-elected in 1997. She served in the position of deputy representative during the terms 1981–1985, 1985–1989, 1989–1993 and 1997–2001. From 1997 to 2000, however, she met as a regular representative meanwhile Magnhild Meltveit Kleppa was appointed to Kjell Magne Bondevik's first cabinet Aarrestad was a member of the municipal council of Time Municipality from 1975 to 1979, and of Rogaland county council from 1975 to 1993. She was a member of the central party board from 1981 to 1989 Outside politics she spent most of her career as a farmer.
