= May Helen Hetland Ervik =

Norwegian politician (born 1970)

Member of the Storting
- Incumbent
- Assumed office 1 October 2025
- Constituency: Rogaland

Deputy Mayor of Eigersund Municipality
- In office 16 October 2023 – 29 September 2025
- Mayor: Anja Hovland (H)
- Preceded by: Leif Erik Egaas (H)
- Succeeded by: Olga Østerbø (FrP)

Personal details
- Born: 3 January 1970 (age 56)
- Party: Progress

May Helen Hetland Ervik (born 3 January 1970) is a Norwegian politician from the Progress Party (FrP). She was deputy mayor of Eigersund Municipality from 2023 and until she got elected to the Storting in the 2025 Norwegian parliamentary election.

Her father was one of the founders of the Progress Party.
