= Hans Frette =

Norwegian politician

Hans Frette (2 September 1927 in Sauda Municipality – 16 October 1989) was a Norwegian politician for the Labour Party.

He was elected to the Norwegian Parliament from Rogaland in 1977, and was re-elected on two occasions. He had previously served as a deputy representative during the terms 1965–1969, 1969–1973 and 1973–1977.

On the local level he was a member of the municipal council of Sauda Municipality from 1955 to 1979, serving as deputy mayor from 1966 to 1968 and mayor from 1968 to 1977. From 1960 to 1971 he was also a member of Rogaland county council. He chaired the local and regional party chapter.

Outside politics he worked for Televerket.
