= Jakob Aano =

Norwegian politician (1920–2016)

Jakob Aano (10 April 1920 – 10 February 2016) was a Norwegian politician for the Christian Democratic Party. He was born in Sauda Municipality.

He was elected to the Norwegian Parliament from Rogaland in 1965, and was re-elected on four occasions. He was never involved in local politics, but was the first vice leader of the national party from 1983 to 1985.

He graduated with the cand.philol. degree in 1948. He wrote for Vårt Land from 1945 to 1959, and was a reporter for the Norwegian Broadcasting Corporation from 1959 to 1963 meanwhile he was working as a school rector in Tanzania. He was later hired by the Norwegian Agency for Development Cooperation. He was a member of the council of the Norwegian branch of the Helsinki Committee for Human Rights from 1983 to 1990, a member of the Arts Council Norway from 1989 to 1992, and a deputy member of the Norwegian Nobel Committee from 1991 to 1999.
