= Tore Nordtun =

Norwegian politician

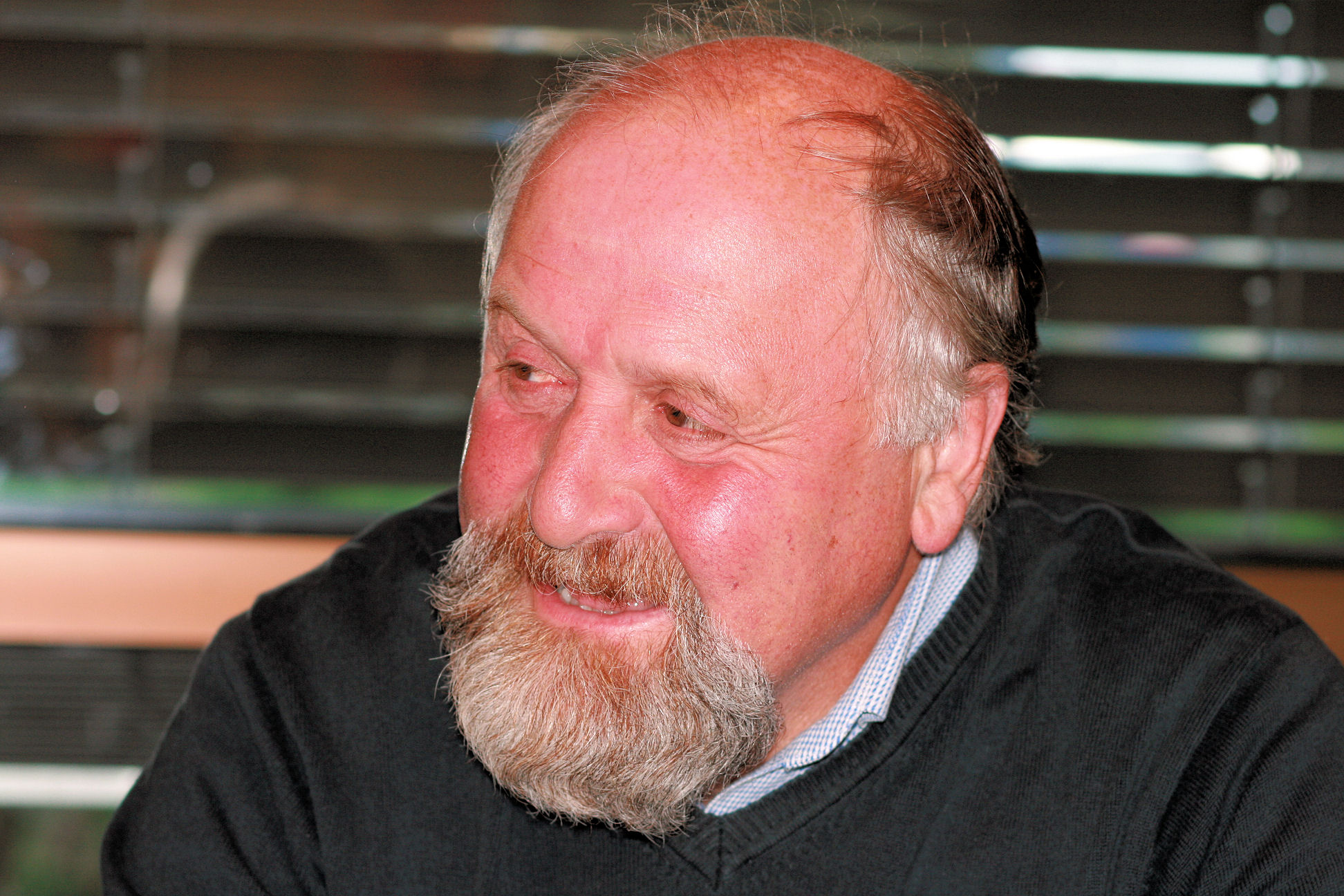
Tore Nordtun in August 2007.

Tore Nordtun (born 30 September 1949 in Bømlo Municipality) is a Norwegian politician for the Labour Party.

He was elected to the Norwegian Parliament from Rogaland in 1993, and has been re-elected on three occasions.

Nordtun held various positions in the municipal council for Stavanger Municipality from 1979 to 1995, serving as deputy mayor in 1987–1989 and mayor from 1990 to 1993. From 1986 to 1990 he was also a member of Rogaland county council. He chaired the city party chapter from 1989 to 1994, and was a member of the Labour Party national board from 1991 to 2003.
