= Aasmund Halvorsen Vinje =

Norwegian politician

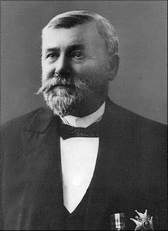

Minister of Agriculture
- In office 11 March 1905 – 6 November 1906
- Prime Minister: Christian Michelsen
- Preceded by: Johan E. Mellbye
- Succeeded by: Sven Aarrestad

Member of the Norwegian Parliament
- In office 1 January 1886 – 31 December 1906
- Constituency: Stavanger

President of the Lagting
- In office 1 January 1903 – 11 March 1905
- Preceded by: Hans Jacob Horst
- Succeeded by: Thore Torkildsen Foss

Personal details
- Born: 25 July 1851 Etne Municipality, Søndre Bergenhus, United Kingdoms of Sweden and Norway
- Died: 4 December 1917 (aged 66) Stavanger, Rogaland, Norway
- Party: Moderate Liberal
- Spouse: Borghild Sofie Fostvedt (m. 1874)
- Children: Torkell Vinje

Aasmund Halvorsen Vinje (25 July 1851 – 4 December 1917) was a Norwegian farmer, teacher, leader of a police district, civil servant and politician for the Moderate Liberal Party. He served as Minister of Agriculture 1905–1906.

He was mayor of Kopervik from 1884 to 1890 and a member of the Parliament of Norway 1885–1906.
