= Kristoffer Sivertsen =

Norwegian politician (born 1988)

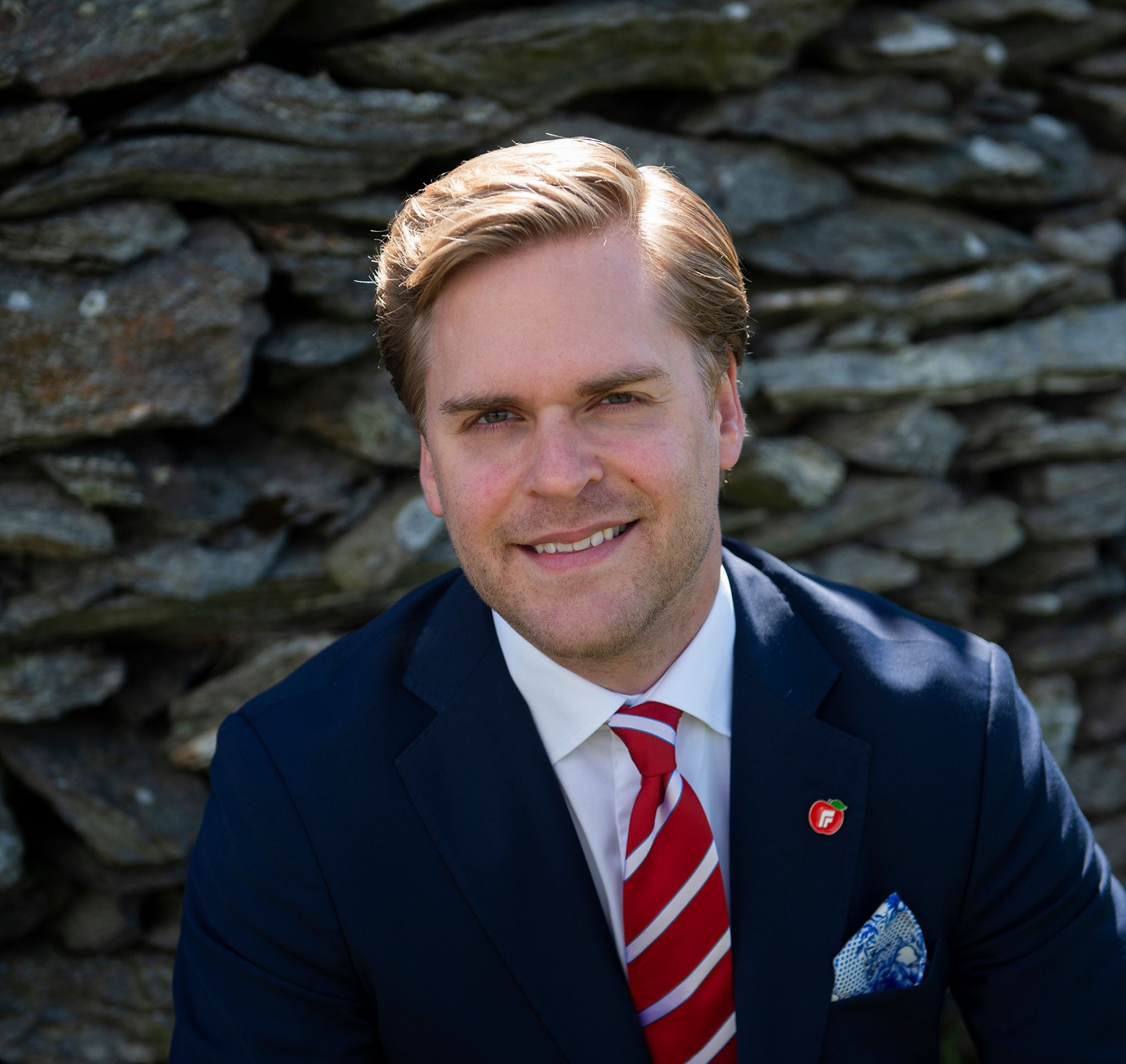
- Sivertsen in 2019

Member of the Storting
- Incumbent
- Assumed office 1 October 2025
- Constituency: Rogaland

Personal details
- Born: 23 November 1988 (age 37)
- Party: Progress Party

Kristoffer Sivertsen (born 23 November 1988) is a Norwegian politician who was elected member of the Storting in 2025. From 2021 to 2025, he was a deputy member of the Storting.
