= Torstein Tvedt Solberg =

Norwegian politician

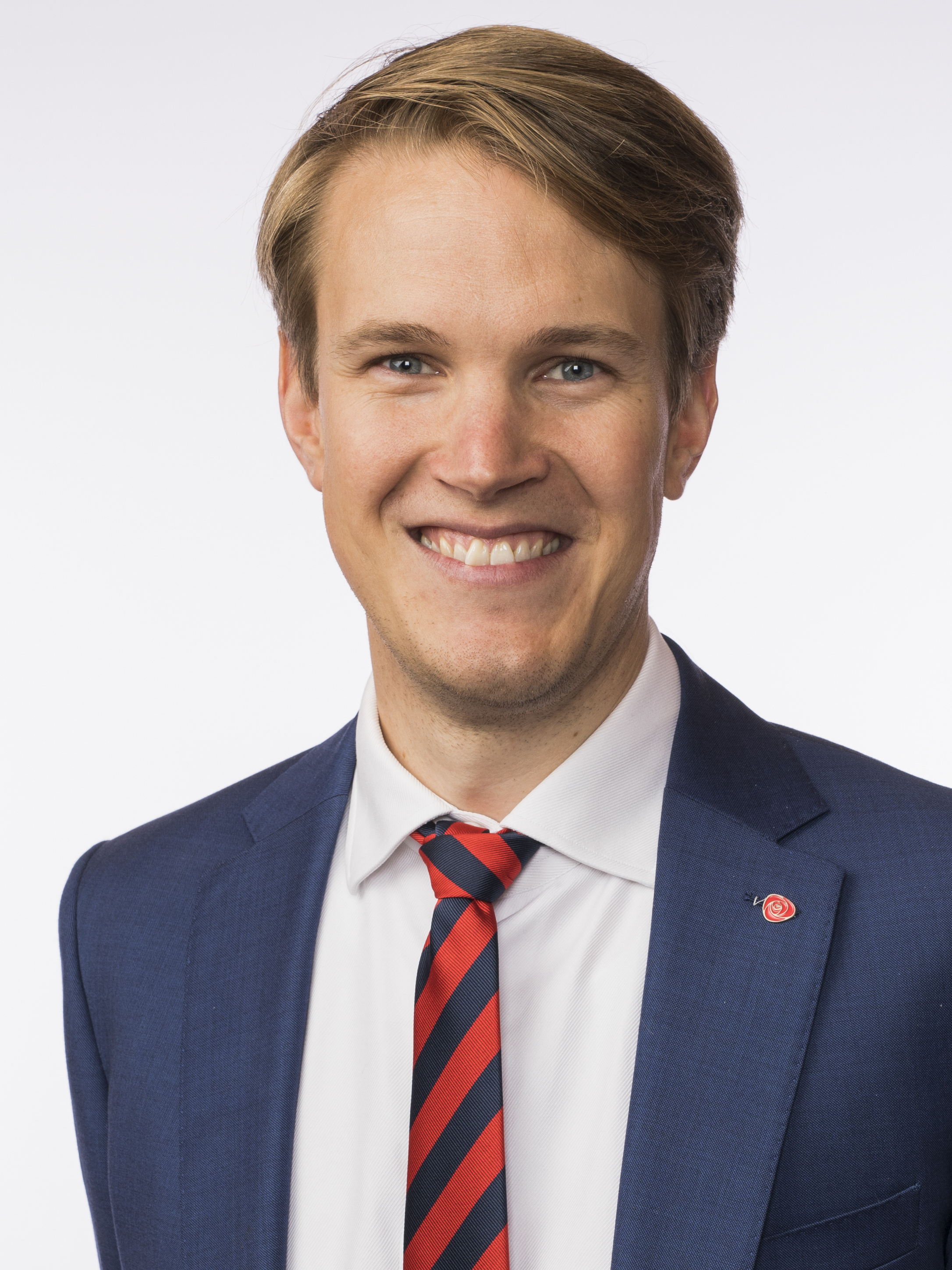

Member of the Storting
- In office 1 October 2013 – 30 September 2025
- Constituency: Rogaland

Deputy Member of the Storting
- In office 1 October 2009 – 30 September 2013
- Constituency: Rogaland

Personal details
- Born: 2 March 1985 (age 41) Stavanger, Rogaland, Norway
- Party: Labour
- Domestic partner: Ina Libak
- Children: 1
- Education: University of Oslo

Torstein Tvedt Solberg (born 2 March 1985) is a Norwegian politician for the Labour Party. He has served as a member of parliament for Rogaland from 2013 to 2025, having previously been a deputy member between 2009 and 2013.

== Education ==
Solberg attended Stavanger Cathedral School. He obtained a bachelor's degree at University of Rogaland a master's degree in Culture, Environment and Sustainability at the University of Oslo in 2013.

== Political career ==
=== Local and youth politics ===
He was a member of Stavanger city council from 2003 to 2011. He was active in Rogaland Workers' Youth League (AUF) for several years and headed it in 2005. He worked as a secretary for Rogaland AUF from 2005 to 2006 and worked as international secretary of the national from 2007 to 2009.

Tvedt Solberg was elected leader of the Rogaland Labour Party in 2020, succeeding Stanley Wirak. He was replaced by mayor of Gjesdal Frode Fjeldsbø at the 2022 convention.

=== Parliament ===
He served as a deputy representative to the Storting from Rogaland between 2009 and 2013. He got the second spot on Rogaland Labour list for the 2013 Norwegian parliamentary election, considered to be a safe mandate for the Labour Party. He was re-elected in 2017 and 2021. He announced in April 2024 that he wouldn't be seeking re-election at the 2025 election.

From September 2012 to June 2013, he was a political advisor to Minister of Trade and Industry Trond Giske.

== Personal life ==
Tvedt Solberg is in a domestic partnership with former Workers' Youth League leader Ina Libak, with whom he has one child.
