= Rune Midtun =

Norwegian politician (born 1973)

Member of the Storting
- Incumbent
- Assumed office 1 October 2025
- Constituency: Rogaland

Personal details
- Born: 17 May 1973 (age 52)
- Party: Progress

Rune Midtun (born 17 May 1973) is a Norwegian politician from the Progress Party (FrP). He was elected to the Storting in the 2025 Norwegian parliamentary election.

Midtun previously worked as a sailor.
