= Ingrid Fiskaa =

Norwegian politician and activist

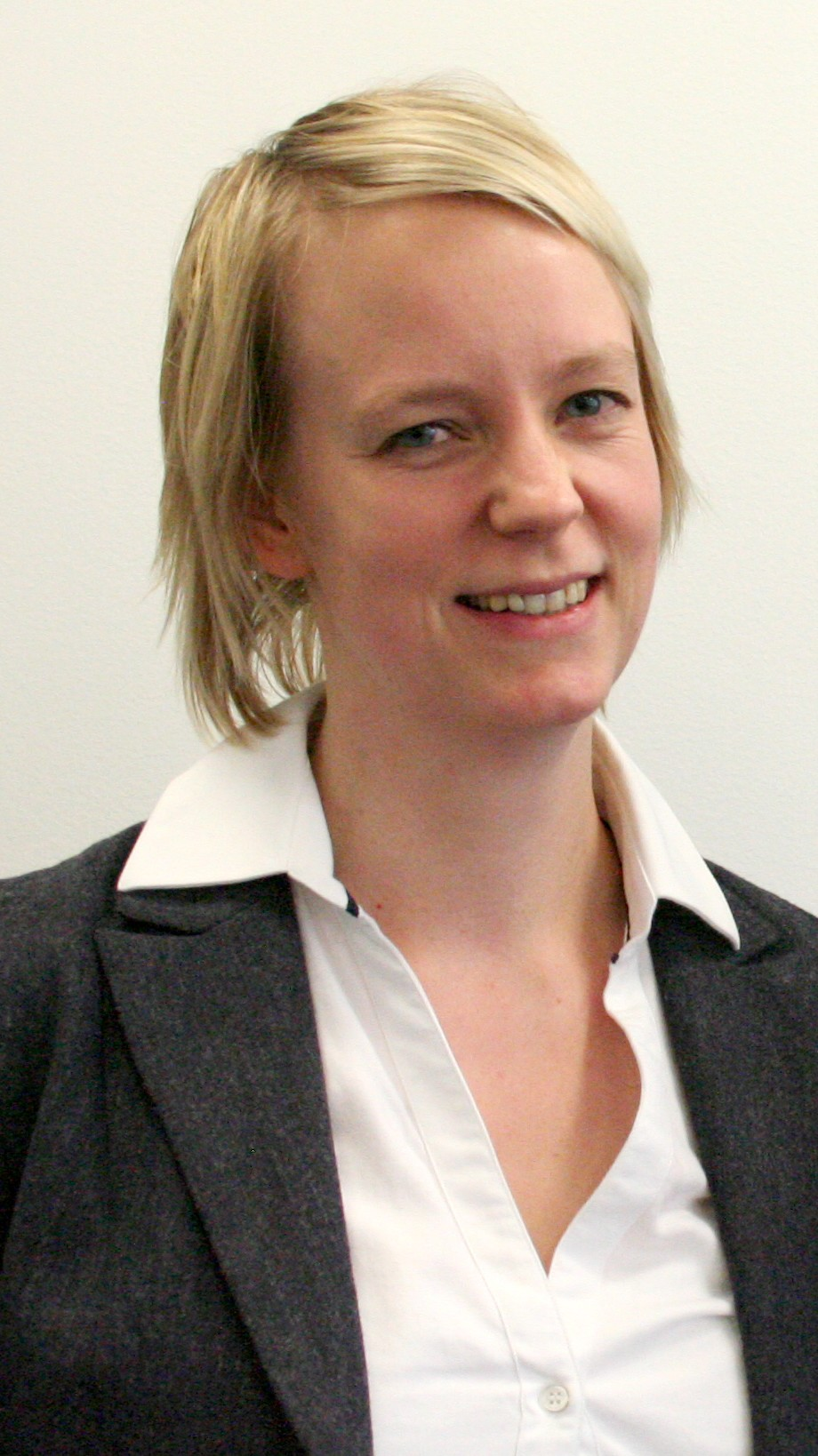
- Fiskaa in March 2010

Fifth Vice President of the Storting
- Incumbent
- Assumed office 9 October 2021
- President: Eva Kristin Hansen; Masud Gharahkhani
- Preceded by: Ingjerd Schou

Member of the Storting
- Incumbent
- Assumed office 1 October 2021
- Constituency: Rogaland

State Secretary for Environment and International Development
- In office 20 November 2009 – 30 March 2012
- Prime Minister: Jens Stoltenberg
- Minister: Erik Solheim; Heikki Holmås

Deputy Member of the Storting
- In office 1 October 2009 – 30 September 2013
- Constituency: Rogaland
- In office 1 October 1997 – 30 September 2005
- Constituency: Rogaland

Personal details
- Born: 16 April 1977 (age 49) Ringerike Municipality, Buskerud, Norway
- Party: Socialist Left
- Education: University of Stavanger; University of Oslo

Ingrid Fiskaa (born 16 April 1977) is a Norwegian activist and politician for the Socialist Left Party.

== Political career ==
=== Early career ===
She was the leader of the Socialist Youth from 2002 to 2004, and also a central committee member of the Socialist Left Party.

=== Party politics ===
In 2007, she was a candidate to become deputy leader of the Socialist Left Party, but lost out to Bård Vegar Solhjell at the national convention.

On 16 December 2022, she announced her candidacy for the deputy leadership in 2023, while also endorsing Kirsti Bergstø for leader, reiterating her county chapter's endorsement. She was ultimately not chosen and the selection of deputy leader came down to Lars Haltbrekken and Marian Abdi Hussein, with the latter ultimately securing the most votes at the party's convention in March 2023.

=== Parliament ===
She served as a deputy representative to the Parliament of Norway from Rogaland from 1997 to 2005, and 2009 to 2013. She was elected as a permanent representative following the 2021 election. She was re-elected in 2025. She also became the fifth Vice President of the Storting, continuing in the post following the latter election as well.

=== Government ===
In November 2009, as a part of Stoltenberg's Second Cabinet, Fiskaa was appointed State Secretary for Erik Solheim in the Ministry of Foreign Affairs.

== Other ==
Fiskaa became a board member of Attac Norway in 2004, and leader of the anti-war organization Fredsinitiativet ('The Peace Initiative') in 2005. She stepped down from Fredsinitiativet in 2008. She has been suggested by peace activist Fredrik Heffermehl as a new member of the Norwegian Nobel Committee.

== Personal life and education ==
She hails from Bryne, and has a bachelor's degree from the University of Stavanger. In 2009 she graduated with a master's degree in history from the University of Oslo.

She is currently in a relationship with Olav Martin Barktveit. The pair currently reside in Time Municipality.

== See also ==
- List of peace activists

Party political offices
Preceded by Kari-Anne Moe	Leader of the Socialist Youth; 2002–2004	Succeeded by Audun Herning
