= Øystein Langholm Hansen =

Norwegian politician (born 1957)

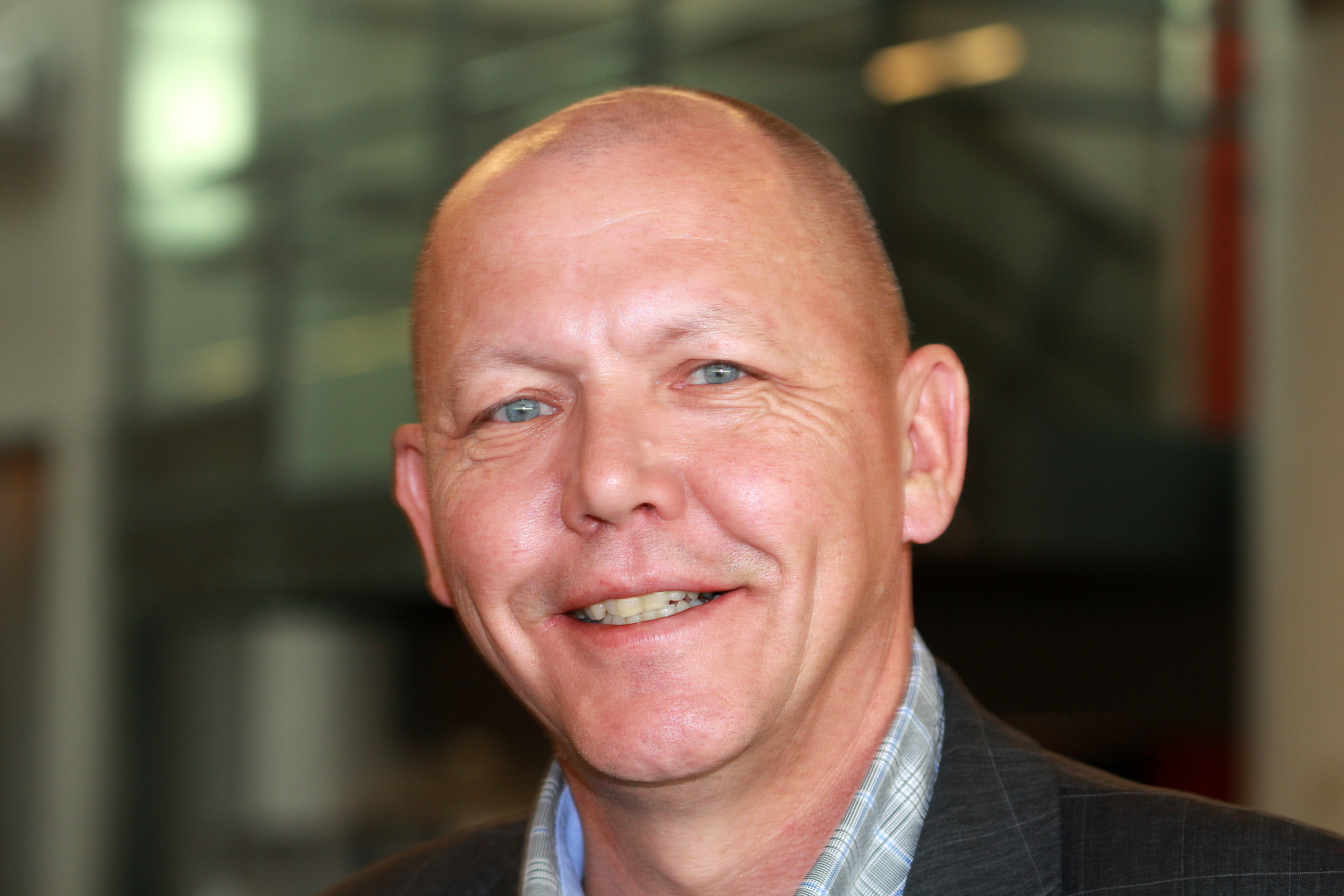

Member of the Storting
- In office 1 October 2017 – 30 September 2021
- Constituency: Rogaland

Deputy Member of the Storting
- In office 1 October 2013 – 30 September 2017
- Constituency: Rogaland

Personal details
- Born: 4 August 1957 (age 68)
- Party: Labour

Øystein Langholm Hansen (born 4 August 1957) is a Norwegian trade unionist and politician for the Labour Party (Ap).

In the 2013 election he was elected as a deputy representative to the Storting from Rogaland. In the 2017 election he was elected as a regular member to the Storting from Rogaland.
