= Hallgeir H. Langeland =

Norwegian politician

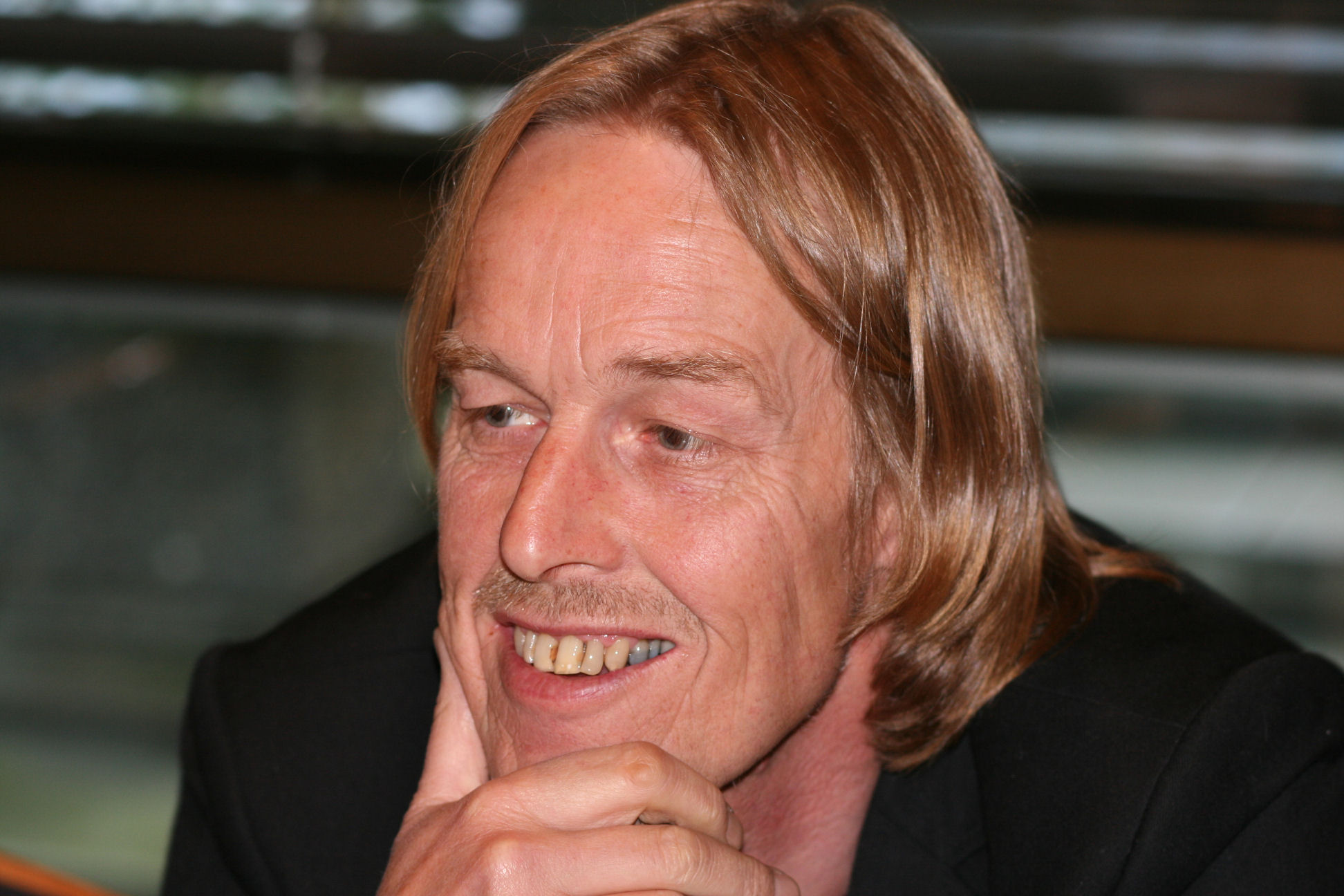
Hallgeir Langeland.

Hallgeir H. Langeland (born 14 November 1955 in Strand) is a Norwegian politician for the Socialist Left Party. He was elected to the Parliament of Norway from Rogaland in 1997 and served to 2013 when he lost his seat in the 2013 Norwegian parliamentary election.

He sat on the municipal council of Stavanger Municipality from 1991 to 1997.

== Parliamentary Committee duties ==
- 2005–2009 member of the Standing Committee on Transport and Communications.
- 2001–2005 deputy member of the Enlarged Foreign Affairs Committee.
- 2001–2005 deputy leader of the Standing Committee on Energy and the Environment.
- 1997–2001 member of the Standing Committee on Energy and the Environment.
- 1997–2001 deputy member of the Electoral Committee.
