= Lisa Marie Ness Klungland =

Norwegian politician (born 1994)

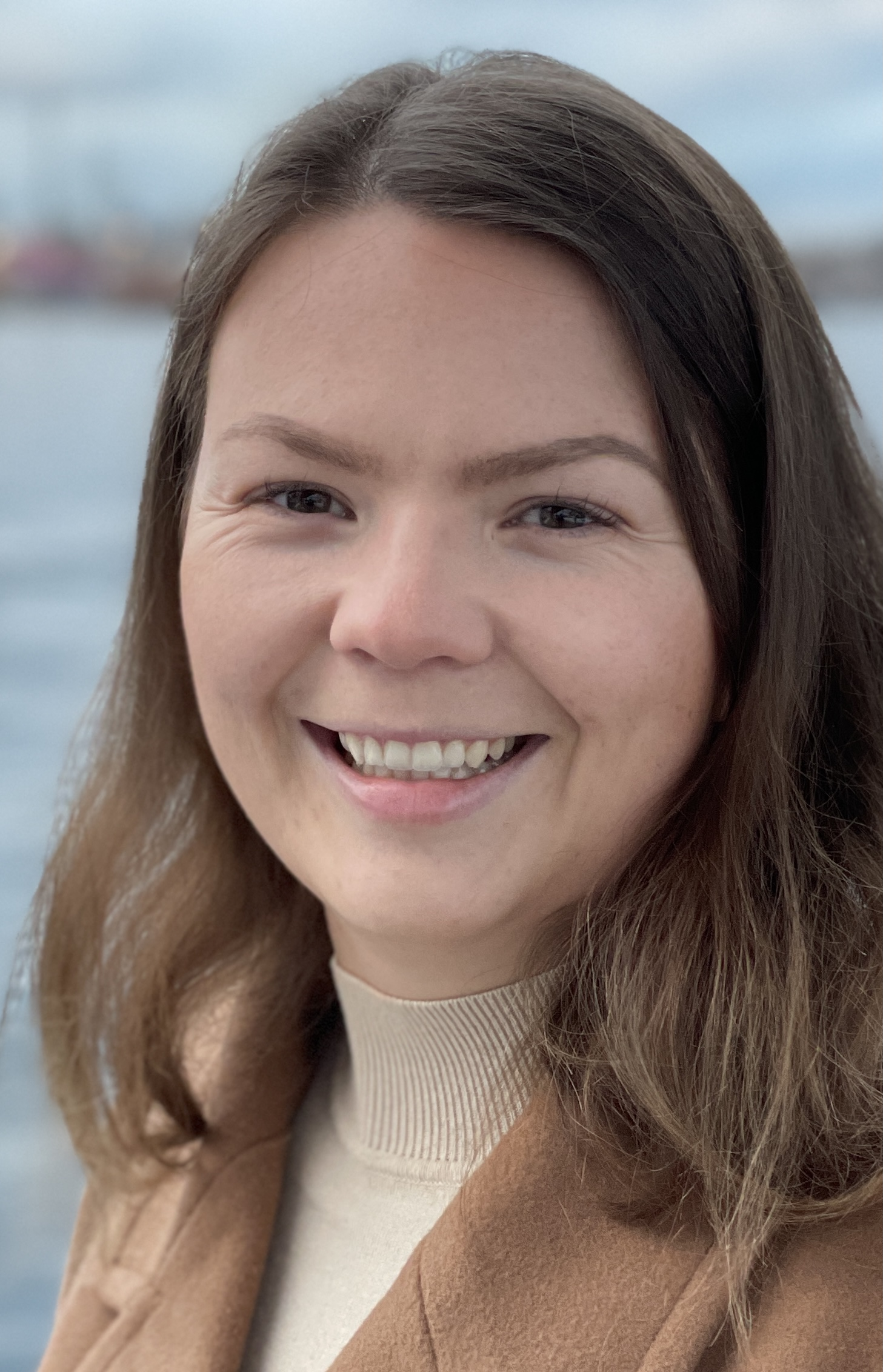
- Lisa Marie Ness Klungland in 2021

Member of the Storting
- In office 1 October 2021 – 30 September 2025
- Constituency: Rogaland

Personal details
- Born: 7 January 1994 (age 32)
- Party: Centre
- Education: University of Stavanger; Norwegian University of Technology
- Occupation: Politician

Lisa Marie Ness Klungland (born 7 January 1994) is a Norwegian politician for the Centre Party (Sp). She was a member of the Storting between 2021 and 2025.

== Biography ==
Klungland was born on 7 January 1994, a daughter of Sigbjørn Klungland and Ingvill Ness. Hailing from Vindafjord Municipality, she is educated in nursing from the University of Stavanger, and in marketing from the Norwegian University of Technology.

She was elected representative to the Storting from the constituency of Rogaland for the period 2021–2025, for the Centre Party.

In the Storting, she was a member of the Standing Committee on Health and Care Services between 2021 and 2025.

She sought re-election for the 2025 Norwegian Election, but she lost her seat and is now a deputy member of the Storting for her fellow Centre Party colleague Geir Pollestad for the 2025-2029 period.
