= Claus Egil Feyling =

Norwegian politician (1916–1989)

Claus Egil Feyling (9 December 1916 in Egersund – 2 March 1989) was a Norwegian politician for the Conservative Party.

He was elected to the Norwegian Parliament from Rogaland in 1977, and was re-elected on one occasion.

On the local level he was a member of the municipal council of Sokndal Municipality from 1967 to 1975, and he served as mayor since 1971. From 1971 to 1975, he was also a member of Rogaland county council.

Outside politics he worked as an engineer. He was active in Rotary.
