= Ruth Mariann Hop =

Norwegian politician (born 1974)

Member of the Storting
- Incumbent
- Assumed office 2025
- Constituency: Rogaland

Personal details
- Born: 29 December 1974 (age 51)
- Party: Labour

Ruth Mariann Hop (born 29 December 1974) is a Norwegian politician from the Labour Party (Ap). She was elected to the Storting in the 2025 Norwegian parliamentary election.

== See also ==
- List of members of the Storting, 2025–2029
