= Jonas Andersen Sayed =

Norwegian politician (born 1997)

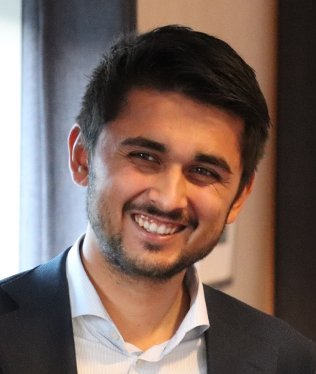
- Andersen Sayed in 2019

Member of the Storting
- Incumbent
- Assumed office 1 October 2025
- Constituency: Rogaland

Mayor of Sokndal Municipality
- In office 28 October 2019 – 30 October 2023
- Deputy: Bjørn-Inge Mydland
- Preceded by: Trond Arne Pedersen
- Succeeded by: Bjørn-Inge Mydland

Personal details
- Born: 18 October 1997 (age 28) Flekkefjord, Vest-Agder, Norway
- Party: Christian Democratic

Jonas Andersen Sayed (born 18 October 1997) is a Norwegian politician currently serving as a member of the Storting for Rogaland since 2025. A member of the Christian Democratic Party, he previously served as the mayor of Sokndal Municipality from 2019 to 2023.

== Political career ==
=== Local politics ===
Sayed was first elected to the Sokndal Municipal Council at the age of 17 at the 2015 local elections.

At the 2019 local elections, the Christian Democrats became the largest party in Sokndal with 26,2% of the vote. The party reached an agreement to work with the Sokndal List, Liberal Party, Centre Party and Progress Party for the next term, with Sayed as mayor. Sayed also received the most personal votes in the election. He was formally elected by the municipal council on 28 October, and was at the time, at the age of 22, the youngest mayor in Norway.

During the municipal budgeting process for December 2019, he gained media attention for slashing his own mayoral salary of 250,000kr in order to free up funds in the municipality's operating budget, in favour of the elderly, volunteering and culture.

Sayed received media attention in Norway and Ukraine when he during the summer of 2023, bicycled from Sokndal to Zaliztsi in solidarity with the country and to raise money for the Armed Forces of Ukraine.

A Sentio Research Group survey measuring satisfaction with local mayors around the country, showed that Sayed had the highest satisfactory rating with 81,7% in 2023.

At the 2023 local elections, his party again became the largest in Sokndal with 28,9% of the vote. Again, he also received the most personal votes. Despite this, his tenure as mayor came to an end when the Liberal and Centre parties, together with the Conservatives and Labour, secured a majority with the support of the Red Party, with his deputy mayor Bjørn-Inge Mydland from the Centre Party as mayor.

=== Parliament ===
Sayed was elected to the Norwegian parliament, the Storting, from the constituency of Rogaland at the 2025 parliamentary election.
