= Kjell Bondevik =

Norwegian politician (1901–1983)

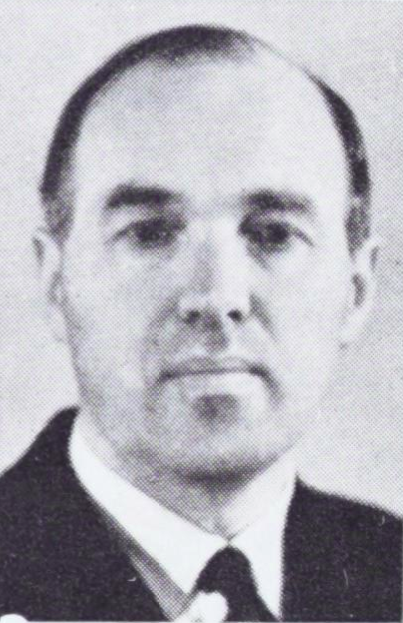

Minister of Education and Church Affairs
- In office 12 October 1965 – 17 March 1971
- Prime Minister: Per Borten
- Preceded by: Helge Sivertsen
- Succeeded by: Bjartmar Gjerde

Minister of Social Affairs
- In office 28 August 1963 – 25 September 1963
- Prime Minister: John Lyng
- Preceded by: Olav Gjærevoll
- Succeeded by: Olav Gjærevoll

Member of the Norwegian Parliament
- In office 1 January 1950 – 30 September 1965
- Deputy: Knut Haus (1963)
- Constituency: Rogaland

Personal details
- Born: 11 March 1901 Leikanger, Nordre Bergenhus, Norway
- Died: 21 December 1983 (aged 82) Oslo, Norway
- Party: Christian Democratic
- Spouse(s): Agnes Sundal (1928–?); Thorkild Bjørnstad (1957–1983)
- Children: Odd Bondevik

Kjell Bondevik (11 March 1901 – 21 December 1983) was a Norwegian politician for the Christian Democratic Party.

He was born in Leikanger Municipality. He graduated with the cand.philol. and mag.art. (PhD equivalent) degrees in 1927. He worked as a teacher and headmaster in schools in Oslo, Haugesund and Sauda. He was a member of the executive committee of the municipal council of Sauda Municipality from 1945 to 1951, and chaired the local party chapter from 1939 to 1947 and the county chapter from 1939 to 1950. He also chaired local chapters of Noregs Mållag as well as Christian organizations. During the occupation of Norway by Nazi Germany, he was arrested in March 1942 for boycotting the Nazi creation, the Teachers Union, together with a large number of other teachers, including Gustav Natvig-Pedersen. He sat at Grini for one day, later at Jørstadmoen and Kirkenes, but was released.

He was elected to the Norwegian Parliament from Rogaland in 1950, and was re-elected on three occasions. From August to September 1963 he served as the Minister of Social Affairs during the short-lived centre-right cabinet Lyng. During this period, Knut Haus filled his seat in the Parliament. In 1965 he was again appointed to a cabinet post, this time as Minister of Education and Church Affairs in the cabinet Borten, which lasted until 1971.

When the cabinet Borten fell over a controversy related to the forthcoming EEC referendum, Bondevik was put in charge of tailoring a renewed centre-right coalition. However, the negotiations between the four parties failed, paving the way for a Labour cabinet Bratteli. In this context Bondevik described himself as djupt såra og vonbråten, "deeply hurt with broken hopes". This is a well-known quote in Norwegian history.

Bondevik also worked at the University of Oslo from 1958 to 1965 and the University of Bergen as a lecturer from 1965 to 1970. In 1982 he was given an honorary doctorate at the University of Tromsø, as the first person. He authored many books, mostly about history topics. Biographies about him were published in 1969 and 1981.

Kjell Bondevik is also known as the uncle of Kjell Magne Bondevik, later Prime Minister, and father of bishop Odd Bondevik.

Political offices
Preceded by Olav Gjærevoll	Norwegian Minister of Social Affairs; August 1963–September 1963	Succeeded by Olav Gjærevoll
Preceded by Helge Sivertsen	Norwegian Minister of Education and Church Affairs; 1965–1971	Succeeded by Bjartmar Gjerde
