= Karl J. Brommeland =

Norwegian politician (1913–1999)

Karl J. Brommeland (13 January 1913 – 19 June 1999) was a Norwegian politician for the Christian Democratic Party.

He was born in Haugesund.

He was elected to the Norwegian Parliament from Rogaland in 1958, and was re-elected on three occasions. He had previously served as a deputy representative in the period 1954–1957.

On the local level he was a member of the executive committee of Haugesund municipal council from 1947 to 1958. He chaired the municipal party chapter in three non-consecutive periods.

Outside politics he spent most of his career as a radio and television set salesman.
