= Karl K. Kleppe =

Norwegian politician

Karl Korneliussen Kleppe (30 March 1877 – 27 March 1959) was a Norwegian farmer and politician for the Liberal Party.

He was born at Kleppe in Klepp Municipality as a son of farmer Cornelius Carlsen Kleppe (1846–1941) and Anne Malene Tønnesdotter Anda (1855–1941). He was first educated at the Rogaland Agricultural School, graduating in 1898, and then at the Norwegian College of Agriculture in 1900. From 1900 to 1942 he was a teacher at Jæren Folk High School, and from 1909 to 1940 he was also in charge of the family farm.

He was deputy mayor in Klepp from 1913 to 1916 (also serving as mayor for some time). He was elected to the Parliament of Norway in 1918 from the constituency Jæderen. He was re-elected in 1921, 1924, 1927, 1930, 1933 and 1936, representing Rogaland. To historians he is known for keeping minute protocols from meetings in the Liberal parliamentary group. He died in March 1959.
