= Geirmund Ihle =

Norwegian politician

Geirmund Ihle (29 December 1934 – 4 June 2016) was a Norwegian politician for the Labour Party.

He was elected to the Norwegian Parliament from Rogaland in 1969, and was re-elected on two occasions.

Born in Haugesund, Ihle was a member of Haugesund city council from 1963 to 1975. He chaired the local party chapter from 1968 to 1969.

Outside politics he mainly worked as a teacher, and was also a journalist in Rogalands Avis from 1964 to 1970 and cinema director in Haugesund from 1971 to 1975. He was a member of the board of Folk og Forsvar from 1984 to 1989 and vice president of Norges Forsvarsforening from 1989 to 1993.

Ihle died in 2016 at the age of 81.
