= Edvard Magnus Edvardsen =

Norwegian politician

Edvard Magnus Edvardsen (18 December 1910 – 11 January 2000) was a Norwegian politician for the Labour Party.

He was born in Egersund.

He was elected to the Norwegian Parliament from Rogaland in 1965, and was re-elected on two occasions. He had previously served five terms in the position of deputy representative, from 1945 to 1965.

Edvardsen was involved in local politics in Egersund from 1934 to 1979, except for the term 1971–1975. He served as mayor in 1945–1947 and 1947–1951.
