= Siri A. Meling =

Norwegian politician

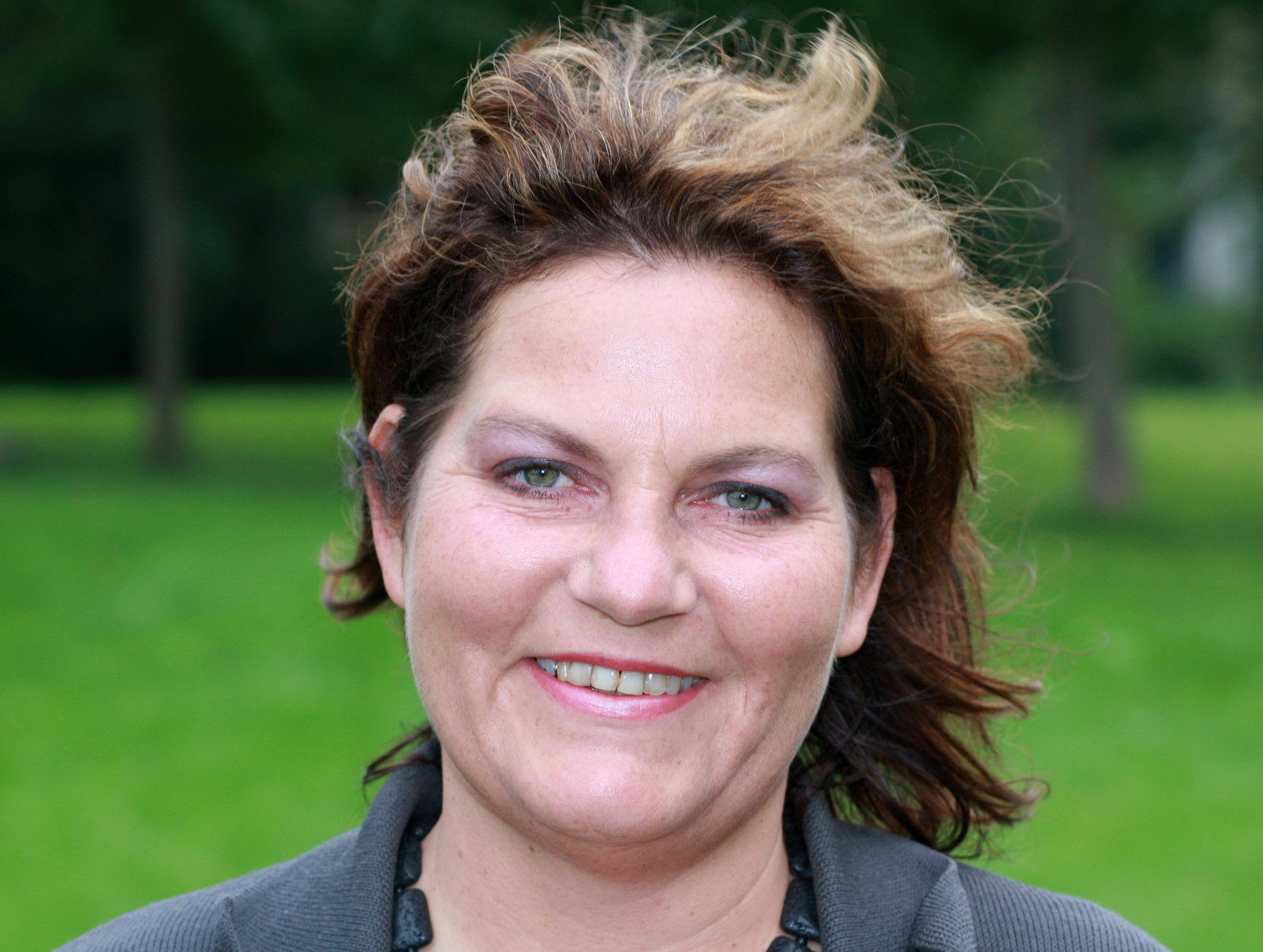
Siri A. Meling in Stavanger 2009

Siri A. Meling (born 8 February 1963 in Stavanger) is a Norwegian politician for the Conservative Party.

She was elected to the Norwegian Parliament from Rogaland in 2001, but was not re-elected in 2005. She served in the position of deputy representative during the term 2005–2009.

She took her education at the BI Norwegian Business School, and then worked as a businesswoman based in Egersund. Since 2006 she is a sub-director in the Norwegian Directorate of Fisheries.
