= Gunnar Kvassheim =

Norwegian politician (born 1953)

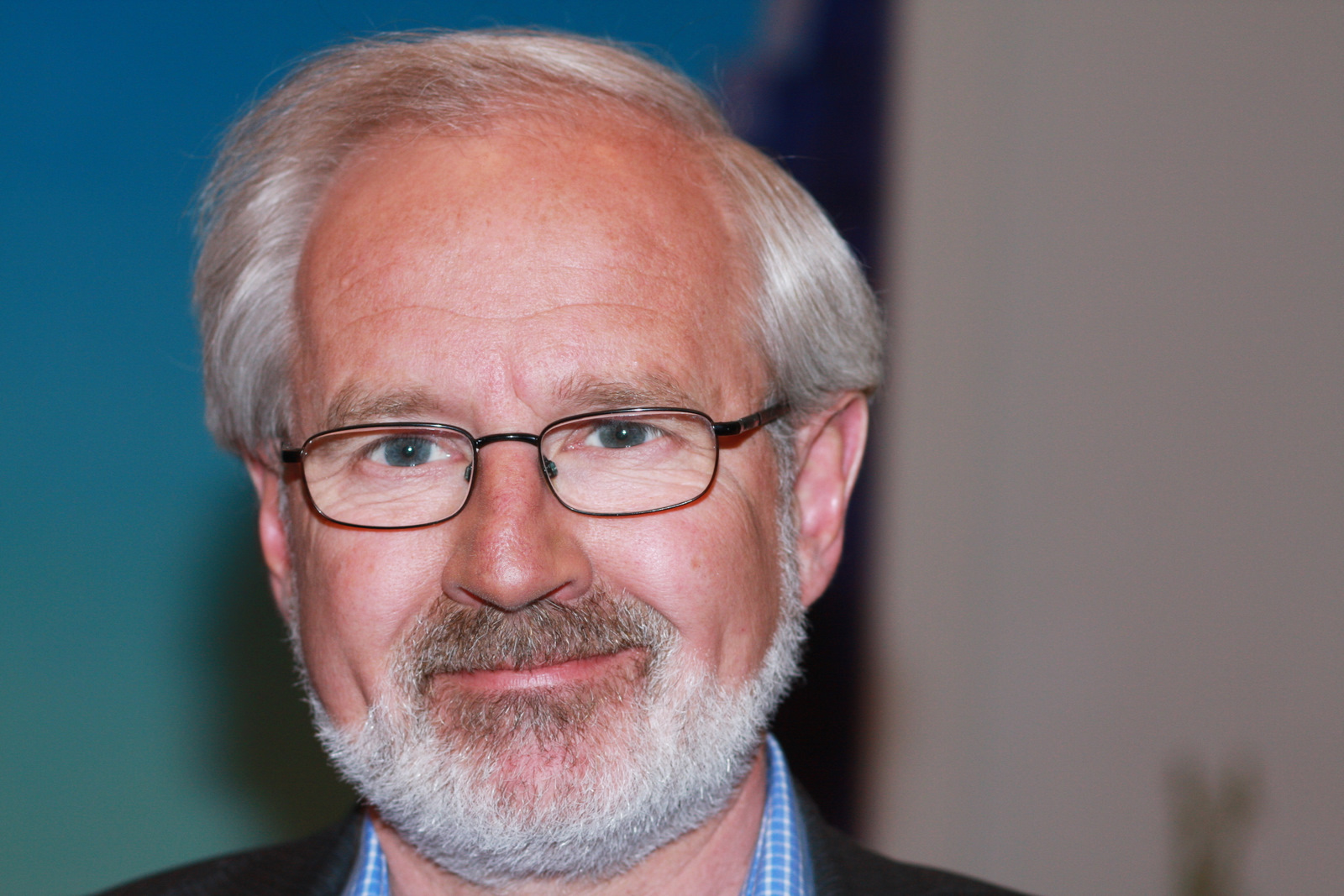
Gunnar Kvassheim

Gunnar Kvassheim (born 14 June 1953, in Eigersund) is a Norwegian politician for the Liberal Party.

He was elected to the Norwegian Parliament from Rogaland in 1997, but not re-elected in 2001. During Bondevik's Second Cabinet, Kvassheim was appointed state secretary in the Office of the Prime Minister. He was re-elected to a second parliamentary term in 2005, where he became chair of the Standing Committee on Energy and the Environment. He failed to be re-elected in 2009 because the Liberal Party missed about 3000 votes. After the election results, Kvassheim resigned from national politics.

On the local level he was a member of the municipal council of Eigersund Municipality from 1975 to 1983. He chairs the local party chapter since 2004 and was the deputy leader of the nationwide party from 1996 to 2001. From 2001 till 2008 he was a member of the Liberal Party central board.

Outside politics he has spent his career in newspapers. He was a journalist from 1976 to 1986 and editor-in-chief of Dalane Tidende from 1986 to 1997. From 2009, he became vice president at Lyse Energi.
