= Marit Løvvig =

Norwegian politician

Marit Løvvig (born 19 March 1938, in Fana) was a Norwegian politician for the Conservative Party.

She was elected to the Norwegian Parliament from Rogaland in 1977, and was re-elected on two occasions.

On the local level he was a member of Haugesund municipal council from 1967 to 1979. From 1971 to 1975 she was a deputy member of Rogaland county council.

Outside politics she spent most of her career as a school teacher. She was active in the Norwegian Association of Local and Regional Authorities for a period. In 2009 she was elected to lead the Rossabø parish council in Haugesund.
