= Magnar Sætre =

Norwegian typographer and politician

Magnar Sætre (12 November 1940 – 5 December 2002) was a Norwegian typographer and politician for the Labour Party.

== Early years ==
He was born in Bergen as a son of principal Peder Sætre and Martha née Johannesen.

== Early career ==
He underwent apprenticeship as a typographer in Haugesund, finishing in 1965. After two years as a typographer in Haugesunds Dagblad he was hired in Haugesunds Avis in 1968. He chaired the trade union branch in Haugesunds Avis from 1973 to 1983, and chaired the local Graphical Union from 1972 to 1973. Sætre served on the board of Haugesund Labour Party from 1972 to 1985, being chairman for the first two and the last two years.

== Parliamentary career ==
Sætre was a member of Haugesund city council from 1971 to 1975, then the executive committee of Rogaland county council from 1975 to 1989. He served as a deputy representative in the Parliament of Norway during the term 1985–1989, and was then elected as a full representative from Rogaland in 1989 and 1997.
