= Sunniva Hakestad Møller =

Norwegian politician

Sunniva Hakestad Møller (5 January 1907 – 30 May 1995) was a Norwegian politician for the Labour Party.

She was elected to the Norwegian Parliament from Rogaland in 1958, and was re-elected on two occasions.

Møller was born in Haugesund and was involved in local politics in Haugesund between 1937 and 1955.
