= Hege Haukeland Liadal =

Norwegian politician

- Born: 29 November 1972 (age 53); Haugesund, Norway
- Occupation: Politician
- Known for: Member of the Storting

Hege Haukeland Liadal (born 29 November 1972) is a Norwegian politician for the Labour Party and fraudster. She was born in Haugesund to Nils Haukeland and Else Fredrikke Rask. She was elected to the Storting, the Parliament of Norway, from Rogaland for the period 2013–2017, where she was member of the Standing Committee on Family and Cultural Affairs.

In 2017 she was reelected to the Storting for the term 2017–2021. Since 2019 she has been under investigation for alleged corruption, related to financial fraud of public funds, ending in a charge, late 2020. As of January 28th she was sentenced to 7 months in jail based on the concluded investigation.
