= Inga Lovise Tusvik =

Norwegian politician

Inga Lovise Tusvik (6 July 1914 – 14 May 1992) was a Norwegian politician for the Liberal Party and later the Liberal People's Party which split from the Liberal Party in 1972.

She was born in Borgund Municipality.

She was elected to the Norwegian Parliament from Rogaland in 1965, and was re-elected on four occasions. She had previously served in the position of deputy representative during the terms 1958–1961 and 1961–1965.

Tusvik was involved in local politics in Askvoll Municipality, Time Municipality, and Voss Municipality during his career. She served as deputy mayor of Time Municipality during the term 1963–1967. She was later a member of Hordaland county council during the term 1975–1979, this time representing the Liberal People's Party.
