= Pål Morten Borgli =

Norwegian politician (born 1967)

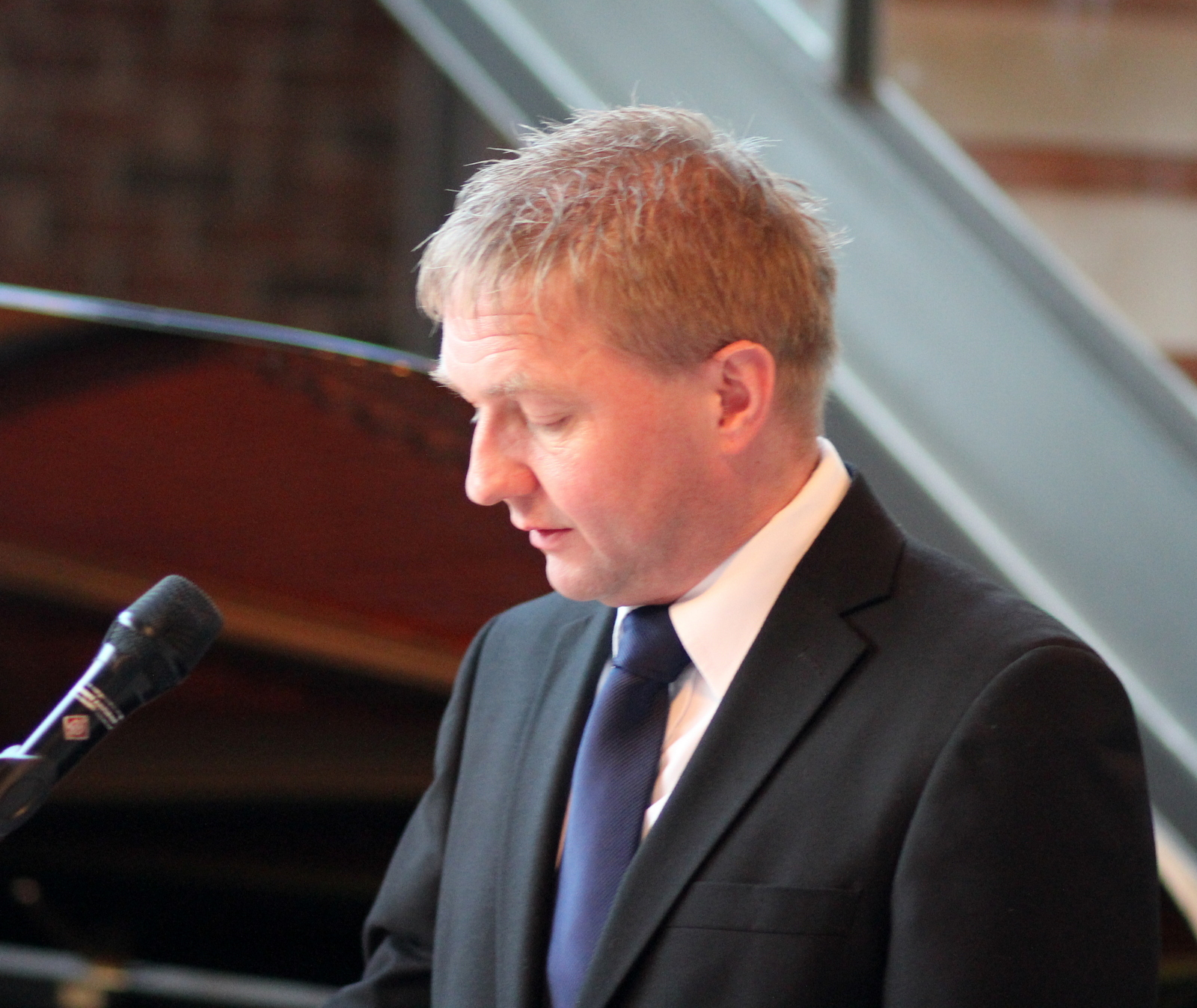
- Borgli in 2014

Member of the Storting
- Incumbent
- Assumed office 1 October 2025
- Constituency: Rogaland

Deputy Member of the Storting
- In office 1 October 2021 – 30 September 2025
- Constituency: Rogaland
- In office 1 October 2009 – 30 September 2013
- Constituency: Rogaland

Deputy Mayor of Sandnes Municipality
- In office 25 October 2011 – 23 October 2023
- Mayor: Stanley Wirak
- Preceded by: Kåre Hauge
- Succeeded by: Kristoffer Birkedal
- In office October 2003 – 23 October 2007
- Mayor: Jostein W. Rovik
- Preceded by: Steinar Ims
- Succeeded by: Kåre Hauge

Personal details
- Born: 3 December 1967 (age 58)
- Party: Progress
- Spouse: Natasja Jovicic (m. 2020)
- Children: 2, including Stine

Pål Morten Borgli (born 3 December 1967) is a Norwegian politician who has served as a member of the Storting for Rogaland since 2025. A member of the Progress Party, he previously served as a deputy member of the Storting from Rogaland between 2009 and 2013 and again from 2021 to 2025. He also served as the deputy mayor of Sandnes Municipality between 2003 and 2007 and again between 2011 and 2023. He is the father of cyclist Stine Borgli.

== Political career ==
=== Local politics ===
Borgli served as the deputy mayor of Sandnes Municipality between 2003 and 2007 under mayor Jostein W. Rovik from the Conservative Party. From 2007 to 2011, he served as his party's group leader in the Sandnes Municipal Council before again becoming deputy mayor under mayor Stanley Wirak of the Labour Party following the 2011 local elections. The coalition between their two parties was considered unprecedented at the time due to their parties' vastly different positions on the political spectrum, but their cooperation continued after both the 2015 and 2019 local elections.

The Progress Party became the largest party following the 2023 local elections and Borgli had sought to work with the Conservative Party with himself as mayor and Kenny Rettore as deputy mayor. Although they agreed on this, their deal hadn't been authorised beforehand by their respective parties. Ultimately Borgli stepped aside as the two parties entered negotiations which instead saw Rettore become mayor and Borgli's fellow party member Kristoffer Birkedal becoming deputy mayor. Borgli then returned to his duties in the municipal council.

=== Parliament ===
Borgli was elected as a deputy member of the Storting from Rogaland at the 2009 election and served until 2013, having announced the year before that he wouldn't seek re-election.

He was later elected for the second time as a deputy member from the same constituency at the 2021 election, holding the position until 2025, when he was elected as a regular member.

=== Party politics ===
At the Progress Party's 2011 party convention, he was elected as first deputy to the central board.

== Personal life ==
Borgli married Bosnian national Natasja Jovicic in June 2020. He has two children from a previous marriage, including cyclist Stine Borgli.
