= Ole Gabriel Ueland (1931–2009) =

Norwegian politician

Ole Gabriel Ueland (31 January 1931 – 5 April 2009) was a Norwegian politician from Varhaug, Rogaland, active in the Centre Party. He was a member of the Norwegian parliament from 1977 to 1993.
