= Finn Martin Vallersnes =

Norwegian politician (born 1945)

Finn Martin Vallersnes (born 27 December 1945 in Haugesund) is a Norwegian politician for the Conservative Party.

He was elected to the Norwegian Parliament from Rogaland in 2001, and has been re-elected on one occasion. He had previously served in the position of deputy representative during the terms 1985–1989 and 1989–1993.

Vallersnes was a member of Haugesund municipality council from 1979 to 1991, and served as mayor from 1995 to 2001.
