= Sverre Mauritzen =

Norwegian politician

- Born: 6 October 1943 (age 82); Stavanger, Norway
- Occupations: Politician; Diplomat

Sverre Mauritzen (born 6 October 1943) is a Norwegian diplomat and politician for the Conservative Party (Høyre). He was a member of the Parliament of Norway from 1981 to 1993, representing Rogaland.
