= Kristian Edland =

Norwegian farmer and politician

- Born: 12 April 1874; Mosterøy, Norway
- Died: 24 October 1958 (aged 84); Stavanger, Norway
- Occupations: Farmer; Politician
- Known for: Member of the Storting for two periods

Kristian Edland (12 April 1874 – 24 October 1958) was a Norwegian farmer and politician.

Edland was born in Mosterøy to farmers David Edland and Serina Døskeland. He was elected representative to the Storting for the periods 1934–1936 and 1937–1945, for the Liberal Party. He served as mayor of Mosterøy from 1925 to 1931.
