= Feminism in Norway =

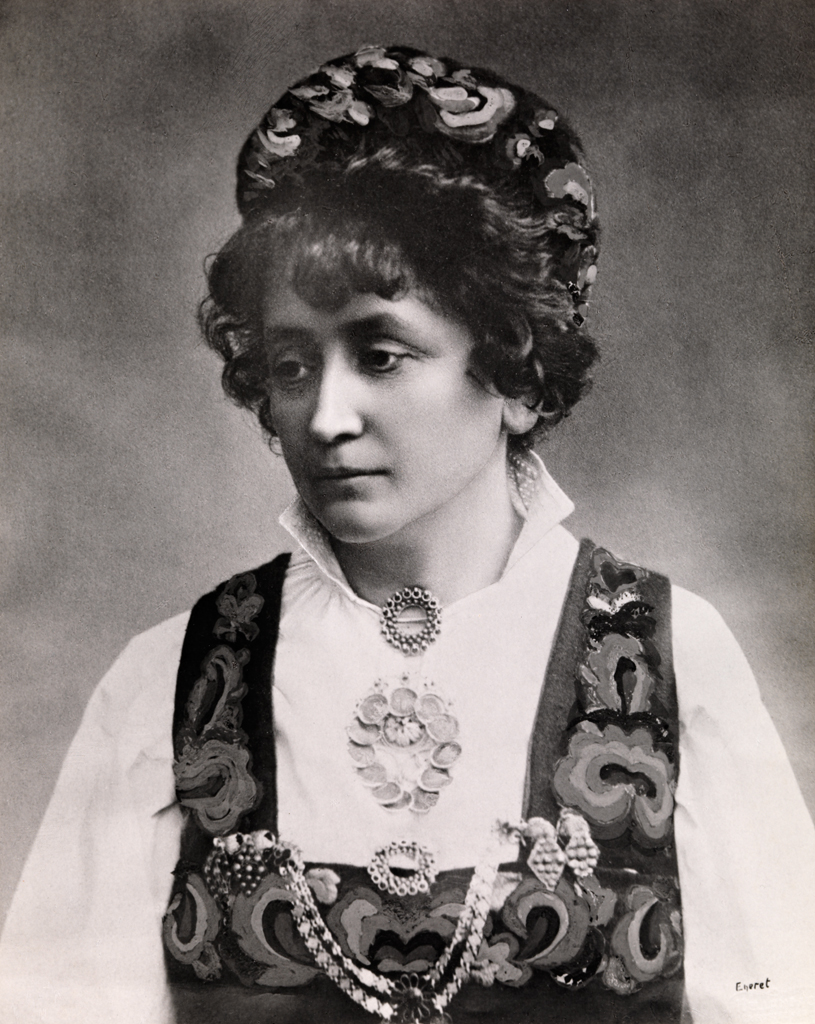
- Feminist Hulda Garborg influenced Norwegian civil society in the 19th century.

Gender Inequality Index
- Value: 0.016 (2021)
- Rank: 2nd out of 191

Global Gender Gap Index
- Value: 0.845 (2022)
- Rank: 3rd out of 146

The feminist movement in Norway has made significant progress in reforming laws and social customs in the nation, advancing the rights of the women of Norway. It emerged in the 19th century as part of the liberal feminist tradition, centered on women's rights to education, suffrage, and political participation, with the liberal Norwegian Association for Women's Rights as the dominant organization. Today, the movement is marked by a strong fourth wave of feminism, emphasizing intersectionality, inclusivity, and solidarity across gender, sexuality, race, ability, and class, with initiatives such as the Initiative for Inclusive Feminism at the forefront. In 2025, 25 feminist organizations and academic communities came together to adopt the consensus statement "No feminism without trans people: We stand together for an inclusive feminism."

== 1840s: First wave of feminism ==
In 1840, Norwegian women's status was considered as incapable meaning it was impossible to enter into any agreement, debts, or even control their own money. They were not entitled to any training or able to be considered for any government job. As for single women, of which there were many during the era, they could request to be placed into employment under the authority of a guardian. On their wedding day, married women transitioned from living under the authority of their fathers to under that of their husbands

During the reign of Magnus VI Lagabøter (1263–1280), the age of majority was set at twenty years for both sexes. Norwegian law changed later during the reign of Christian V (1670–1699). His regime issued the Law in Norway (1687) which, following the Danish rules of that time, defined unmarried women as minors.

However, in 1845, a first step towards women's emancipation was taken with the "Law on the vast majority for single women", for which women's majority was set to age 25 at which point a woman would no longer need a legal guardian.

In the first part of the 19th century, women worked in the early textile mills (1840) and in the tobacco factories, which were reserved for their employment. They also worked in the food industries and jobs requiring "little hands", but they did not work in heavy industry.

The literature marketed to women of the time was still a reflection of society's value system: only the quest for a husband was to be found in these novels. Among the women writers published in Norway during the era were Hanna Winsnes, Marie Wexelsen and Anna Magdalene Thoresen.

=== 1854 to 1879: Awakening consciousness ===
During this period, new laws were passed, and although they did not at once revolutionize the status of women, barriers were being crossed regularly and rapidly. Formal equality of women with men became almost complete in the space of just two generations. In 1854 the law on royal succession granting full equal inheritance for both sexes was passed after heated debate and resistance. (Prior to this a woman's inheritance was limited to joint rule.)

In 1863, a new law was passed on the age of majority that succeeded that of 1845: women attained the age of majority at 25 years, as well as men. As for widows, divorced and separated, they become major "regardless of age". In 1869, the age of majority was reduced to 21, although not without some wondering whether it was defensible for women. The committee of law, believing that women matured more rapidly than men, stated that this age is very suitable for her. In 1866, a law was passed establishing free enterprise (except for married women) so that anyone could obtain a license in their city.

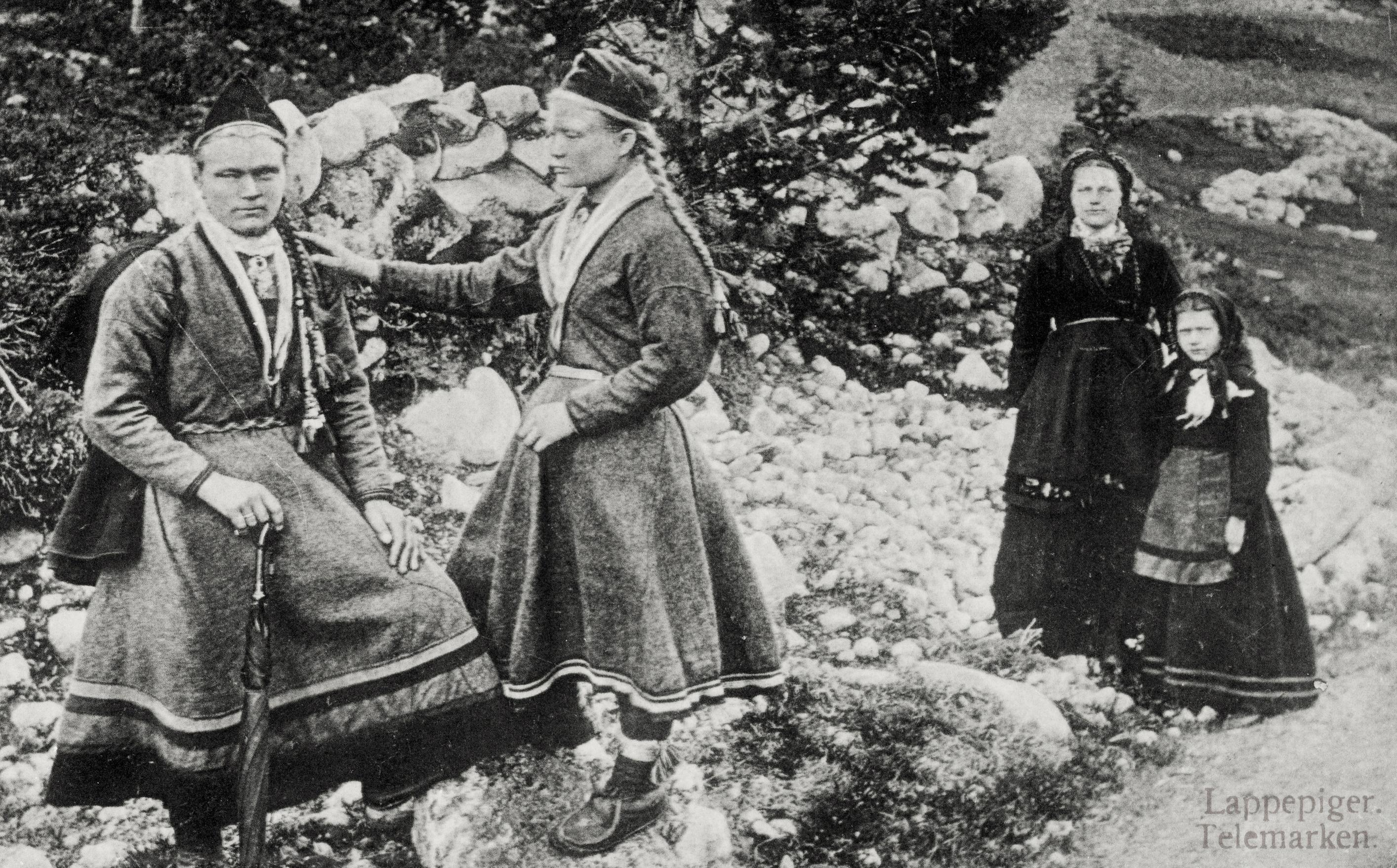
Sami girls in Telemark County, Norway, in 1880.

But it is mainly through literature that women expressed themselves. Camilla Collett is the first writer who went outside the bounds which had been established for women's literature up until that time, and whose most famous novel, The Daughters of the Prefect (1855), deals with the education of bourgeois women in the 19th century. The central theme of this novel is the conflict between the standard conventions of society and the feelings and needs of the individual. Also, Aasta Hansteen served as a passionate voice of the feminist cause, and whose colorful persona served as a model for the character of Lona Hessel in Henrik Ibsen's The Pillars of Society (1877).

== The second wave of feminism (1879–1890) ==
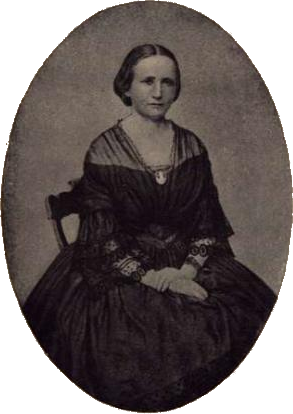
Norwegian writer and feminist Camilla Collett.

The writers who took up the case for women would claim Camilla Collett as their inspiration, and thus created the first wave of feminism in Norway.

=== The role of literature ===
In 1871, Georg Brandes initiated the movement of The Modern Breakthrough: he asked that literature serve progress and not reactionary views. It was then that Norway had the writers who became known as the "Big Four", namely Henrik Ibsen, Bjørnstjerne Bjørnson, Alexander Kielland and Jonas Lie. All would speak for the cause of women. Camilla Collett and Aasta Hansteen wrote to defend the cause of feminist theories that were an integral parity of a larger program for the authors of the Modern Breakthrough. For the latter, it will be to defend the oppressed people against the social expectations of the time, of which the wife was one: women who received a primary education whose sole purpose was marriage, women who were unable to continue to fully enjoy intellectual lives, who could not freely dispose of their own life and body.

This is especially through two plays, The Pillars of Society (1877) and A Doll's House (1879), where Ibsen took up the cause of modern humanism and individualism. The latter play in particular had a significant influence on the feminist movement even outside Norway, as it was translated into several languages and performed widely across Europe and beyond.

Bjørnson wrote a play in 1879 called, Leonarda, in which he defends the woman who "has a past." But above all, his play A Glove (1883) had a great impact on the public in Norway.

During 1880, Norway experienced a proliferation of debates, the first concern of women being that of double standards.

=== The debate on double standards ===
During the 19th century, Norway was a very poor country, which led to a rural exodus and high levels of emigration. In 1882, Norway had 30,000 departures from a population of 1.9 million inhabitants. However, the number of emigrants is higher than 27% of females in 1900; by that year, there were 165 men to every 100 women. The consequence was the disintegration of the family unit, resulting in an increase in births outside marriage and an overwhelming increase in prostitution.

The explosion of prostitution and the proliferation of brothels cause strong reactions, which focused public attention on the problem of sexual morality. The Christians of Bergen are the first to lead the offence in 1879. In 1881 the Association Against Public Immorality was founded.

During the debate on double standards (1879–1884), marriage was regarded as the basic unit of society, but one that should be reformed. For the authors of The Bohemia of Kristiania, it was more radical: marriage was not a foundation of society, and the debate should focus on a more political solution to women's inequality. While Arne Garborg considered marriage as a necessary evil, [Hans Jaeger] believed that marriage should be replaced with free love.

Not sharing the same views expressed by the Bohemia of Kristiania, writer Amalie Skram became the most radical character during the period. If, like other writers, she denounced the difference in treatment between adulterous men and women, she then considered that the Don Juan was the male equivalent of a prostitute: the conventional view was that Don Juan does not sell himself, he accumulates his conquests; for Skram, this is not a valid argument, because a woman has accumulated conquests, too, although her conquests will be seen as prostitution even when she is not selling.

Literature enabled a real challenge by Ibsen and Bjørnson to the middle classes, with The Bohemia of Kristiania spreading through the popular consciousness.

=== Advances in everyday life ===
In 1884, the Norwegian Association for Women's Rights was created, the first formal women's rights organization in Norway. In 1885, the Association for Votes for Women was founded, but it dissolved in 1898. In 1890, the first women workers' union was established, then in 1896, that of the Norwegian Women's Health Organisation and in 1904 the National Council of Women.

Two significant laws were passed in 1890. By the first law, married women gained majority status. The second law ended the authority of the husband over the wife. The man retained control of the home of the couple, but the woman could now freely dispose of the fruit of his work.

== From 1890 to 1960 ==
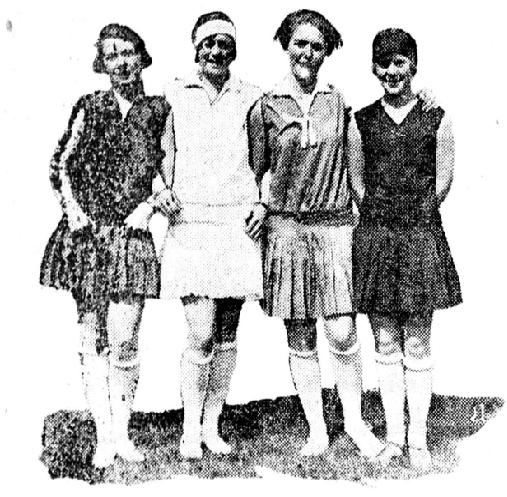
Women wearing sporting outfits, ready to play football, from the Norwegian newspaper Aftenposten, 16 June 1928.

=== Voting ===
Unlike some countries where women gained the right to vote through one piece of legislation, there were several stages in Norway.

The expanded suffrage in 1884 became "universal" in 1898. In 1886, the Norwegian Association for Votes for Women had demanded access to universal suffrage. However, in 1901, women who can establish a minimum income of their own and those who are married to a voter may participate in municipal elections and then in 1907 in national elections.

It was in 1910 that universal suffrage is adopted for all municipal elections and in 1913 for national elections. The first woman to hold office at the Norwegian parliament, the Storting, is Anna Rogstad in 1911. She sat for the political right wing, along with the conservatives and the moderate leftists. However, women were rare in politics and in the Storting.

=== The return of the housewife ===
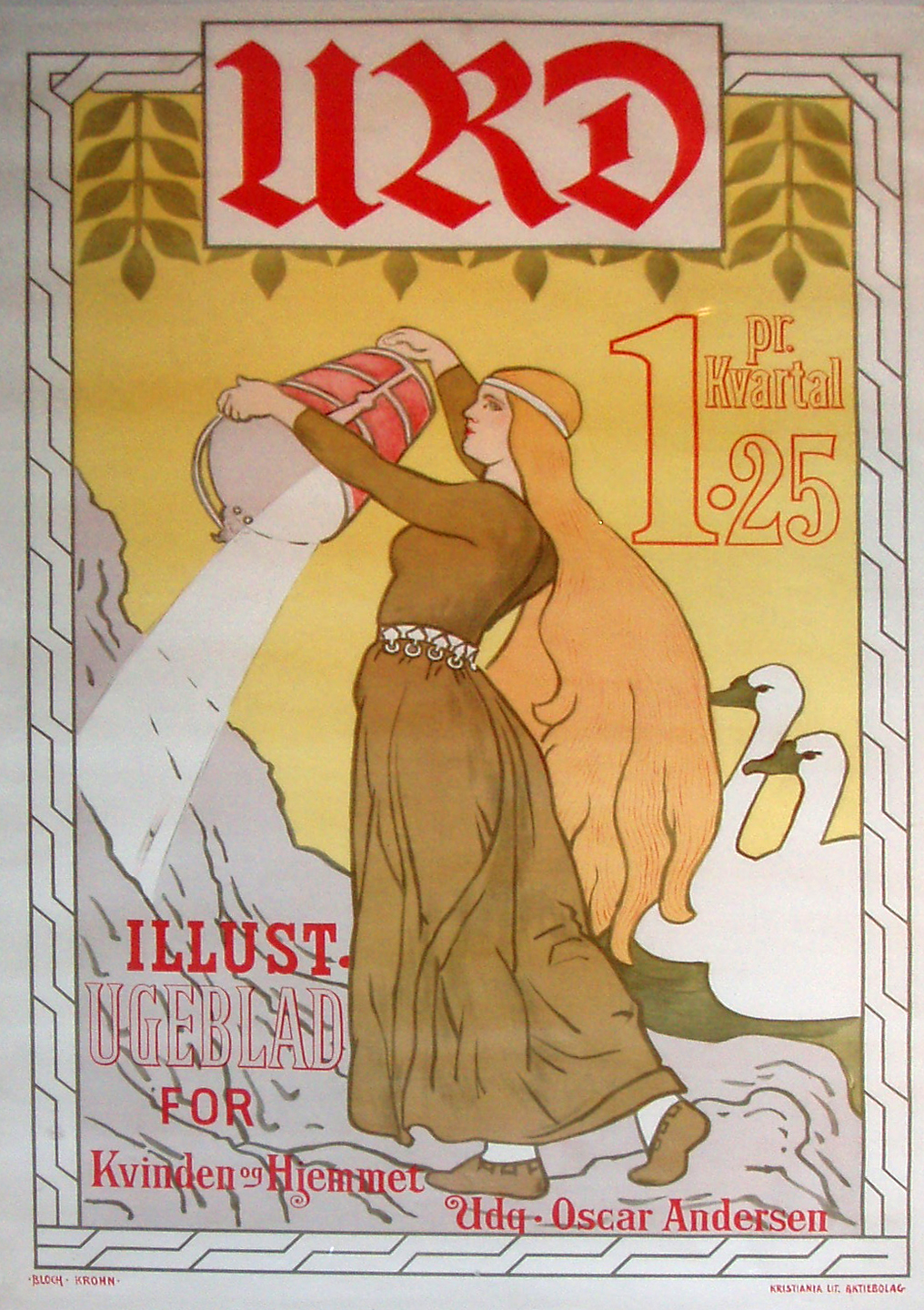
Cover from a Norwegian women's magazine, Urd, which published between 1897 and 1958. This issue is c. 1905.

The economic situation in Norway remained fragile, with rising unemployment that mainly affected low-skilled occupations and women.

The ideology of the housewife arrived at this time, with the support of the state church. There were women who were behind this movement and the creation of the Organization of Norwegian Housewives. This movement and its leaders were focussed on the middle class and the bourgeoisie: its influence is among the lowest in the country overall, and it had little effect on the working class.

The original idea of this movement was that domestic work is not innate in women, but rather it is learned. It became "more professional" through schools of home economics, that trained women in the maintenance of the house. They were taught the basics of cooking and even managing the household money. This movement would even have an economic impact, with the "Buy Norwegian!" slogan. Its influence enabled it to hold conferences and events even during periods of restriction in the 1920s.

During these same years, the work of married women was prohibited. However, there were gains as well, as the 1927 Law on Spouses awarded equal legal weight to the verbal testimony of the housewife in parity with men.

The transformation of the Norwegian society from a rural peasant one to an industrial society, led to very rigid and inflexible gender roles, where the housewife and the provider husband became the new ideals for women and men. According to Hilde Danielsen, with regard to the history of women's rights during the first part of the 20th century in Norway: "We were ahead in terms of suffrage for women, but apart from that Norway hasn’t got much to show for".

=== Birth control and population decline ===
Women were now expected to return to the home and family life. Norway at the time was experiencing a population decline that it was attempting to slow or even reverse.

The issue of birth control, and the fierce opposition of conservatives, slowed the development of legislation on contraception and abortion, which for the time, were relatively liberal. Nonetheless, the law punished a woman who had an abortion with three years in prison, as well as six perpetrators of abortion.

=== Limited progress ===
It was in the 1920s that the principles of equal pay and the right to access all jobs in the government became established.

=== Literature ===
The writers of the time, Hulda Garborg, Nini Roll Anker and Sigrid Undset in particular, believed that if the feminist struggles of the 1880s were necessary, they were now outdated.

=== The post-war years ===
In 1946, allowances for mothers at home were created.

In 1950, women who married foreigners could decide for themselves whether to keep Norwegian citizenship or not. That same year, the question of the right of each woman to freely assume control over her own body became a reality in the Norwegian National Council of Women.

== The third wave of feminism (1960–1990) ==
=== Issues of feminism in the second wave ===
The first wave of feminism was to change the position of women in marriage, and to end the subjection of married women; the next wave of feminism fought to obtain the same rights as men.

The 1960s were marked by many protests, the appearance of new ideas, and the first feminist writers of the second wave.

It was no longer enough to claim a female otherness, but rather to define feminine values and shape society according to these values. The aim of the second wave of feminism was therefore to alter the nature of the state, which at the time, was essentially male.

In order to achieve their goal, the feminists needed to distinguish themselves from other protest movements of the 1960s. The women experienced with these movements acted to create their own because they had not been advanced: even the typical revolutionary movement was not devoid of machismo. As a result, feminists seized issues pushed by politics and took their cause (equal pay, abortion, and so on).

== From the August 1970 meeting to organize the women's movement ==
The founding act of the new feminist movement was in August 1970, when the Norwegian Association for Women's Rights decided to organize a large meeting in Oslo with, as keynote speaker Jo Freeman.

In the following months, many groups formed across Norway. This new organization of the women's movement attracted the attention of radio, newspapers and television.

Many women's groups were formed at the base with different motivations: they discussed both housing problems and the place of women in the workplace. Female solidarity grew across borders and social origins: this was one of the major differences between the feminism of the first and the second wave.

=== Old and new movements ===
The new women's movement would be more radical and specific, but these movements would also join forces to carry forward new battles. In fact, the different movements rarely opposed each other: they simply represented a different sensibility.

Two movements were created in 1972: Bread and Roses and The Women front, which was the most radical feminist movement. As for the civil rights movement for GLBT Norwegians, they would form various GLBT organizations during the 1970s.

=== Abortion ===
The first law to legalize abortion was passed in 1964. It allowed abortion in cases of danger to the mother, and the abortion decision was taken by two doctors.

The new association of women made this issue one of its central themes. In June 1974, several organizations came together to form the action group for the free choice of women to abortion. In the autumn of 1974, a bill was introduced in Storting, but it is defeated by one vote.

A new bill was introduced in January 1975, which would expand the conditions of abortion. The examination of the law divided the unity of the action group and it disbanded.

In spring 1978, the law on free access to abortion was passed in Storting.

=== Literature wife (Kvinnelitteratur) ===
Bjørg Vik led the way in the 1960s, but during the 1970s, a literature developed in which women must be distinguished from literature in the traditional sense (with authors such as Eldrid Lunden, Liv Køltzow, Cecilie Løveid, and Tove Nilsen), a literature of witness to women's experiences.

=== Many reforms ===
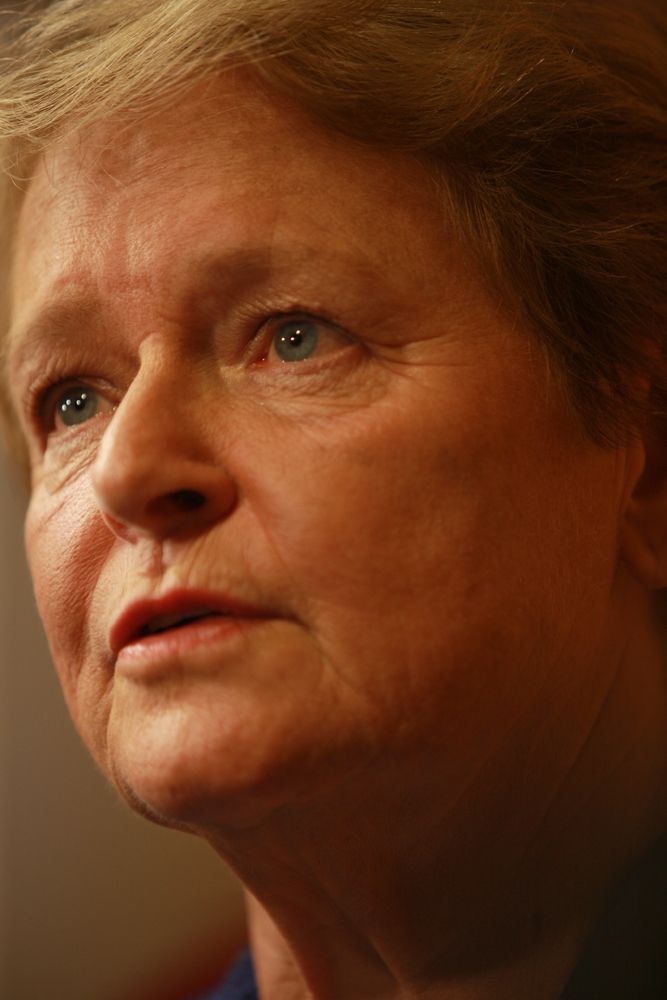
Norway's first woman Prime Minister, Gro Harlem Brundtland.

In 1971, Norway made marital rape illegal.

From 1975, many reforms were implemented:

1977

- Law on the work environment that allows, among other reforms, to extend pregnancy leave and greater access to parental leave.

1978

- Abortion law
- Law on Gender Equality (implemented in 1979). To ensure compliance, an ombudsman responsible for enforcing the law on gender equality is created along with a complaints committee for equality. Norway is the first country to adopt such means. Even if the sanctions were limited, the mediator had a genuine moral authority.

=== A single movement in Europe ===
The Norwegian women's movement had a feature that was not found in any other Western country: the "gentle" movement of Myke Menn.

=== Feminization of politics ===
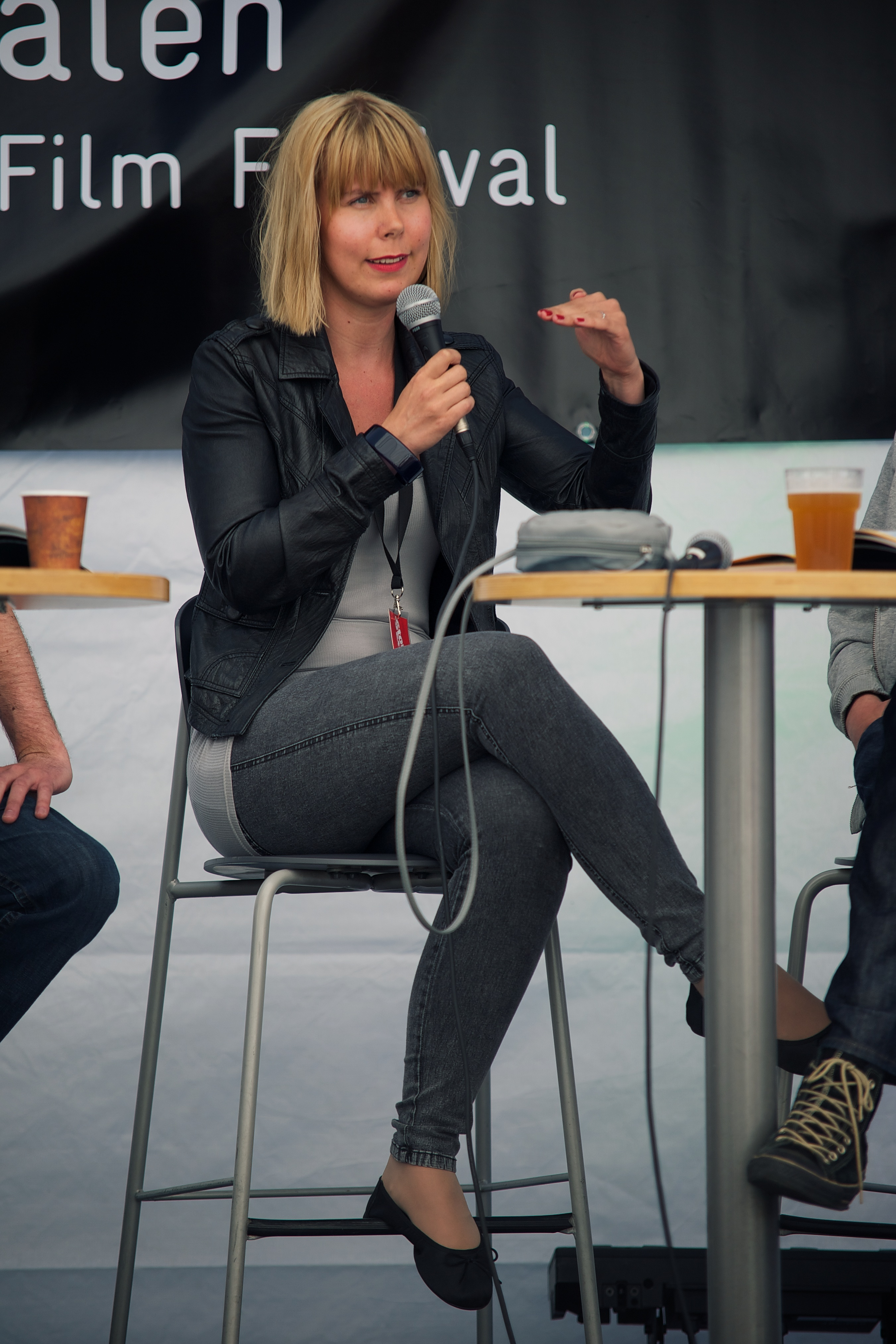
Norwegian filmmaker Hanne Larsen. Norwegian women continue to make progress in traditionally male-dominated fields.

In 1974, the Liberal party (Venstre) and then in the following year, the Radical Socialist Party (Sosialistisk Venstreparti, SV), inaugurated a new political strategy: 40% of candidates on the lists and the important posts are reserved for women. But it was not until 1983 for the Arbeiderpartiet (AP), 1989 for the Senterpartiet (SP) and 1993 for the Kristelig Folkeparti (KRF).

In 1977, the municipalities decided to implement parity in local elections. Without a character of obligation to this decision, the parity was implemented in 1980 in over 300 counties out of 439.

In Storting, female representation is experiencing a rapid evolution:

- 1969: 9% of MPs are women
- 1973: 16% of MPs are women
- 1977: 24% of MPs are women

The first woman to hold the post of prime minister in Norway was Gro Harlem Brundtland. After the 2013 national election, Erna Solberg of Høyre (H) became Norway's second female prime minister.

=== Feminism and work ===
In the 1970s, the struggle over equal pay dominated the decade. In the 1980s, there was a desire to better coordinate work and family life. In 1987, parental leave was extended considerably, but above all, fathers became equally entitled, and do not hesitate to use it.

The Labour Code which dates from 1935 was revised regularly.

- Review of 1981: Provided equal treatment between men and women in hiring and salary
- Revision 1985: creation of a delegate for equality between men and women in business.

=== Parental leave ===
Parental leave is a benefit program that gives parents paid time off from work in a limited time period. In Norway, workers often have the right to leave during pregnancy, adoption, the children's illness or caretakers illness. Workers have had the opportunity to take a parental leave since the 1970s but legislation changed drastically in 1993. If the employee receives a salary from the employer during the time of leave, the time off is considered as a paid leave. If the employee does not receive a salary from their own or other employers, the time off from work is considered an unpaid leave. Parental leave includes maternity, paternity, adoption and pregnancy leave.

Parents have a right to leave as long as they receive parental benefits from National Insurance via NAV (Norwegian Labour and Welfare Administration).

If parents or care-takers choose to receive 100% parental leave of what they are entitled to, that gives them paid leave for 49 weeks, referring to the July 1st 2013 legislation or if they choose to receive 80% parental leave of what they are entitled to, that gives them paid leave for 59 weeks. Parents can distribute these weeks between themselves as they wish with an exception of three weeks before birth and six weeks after birth that are reserved for the mother and 10 weeks fathers quota that is reserved for the father.

The basis for the calculation of parental benefit is each of the parents wages based on the same rules that apply for sick leave.

==== Pregnancy leave ====
Pregnant workers have the right to maternity leave for up to 12 weeks during pregnancy. Parental leave can be distributed from this point. 3 weeks before the due date is reserved for the mother and is included in the maternity quota for parental leave. She has to take advantage of these 3 weeks or they will not count for later.

==== Birth Leave ====
The first 6 weeks after birth is also reserved for the mother. The father though has the right to take out 2 weeks of leave after birth. This is not a part of the set parental quota of 10 weeks, which is usually taken out later in the benefit period.

==== Fathers quota and mothers quota ====
The fathers quota has up until 2013 been 14 weeks and is reserved for the father/co-mother. From 2013 this law was changed so that the parental leave was parted into three parts with equally long sections (14 weeks) where one part is reserved for the mother and another for the father. 6 weeks of the mothers quota has to be taken out in association with birth. The fathers quota as of July 1, 2014 has been changed from 14 weeks to 10 weeks. This applies to all parents that have children after this date. The purpose of the fathers quota has been to contribute to a more equal distribution of care taking between mothers and fathers. As a political measure it is supposed to change the relationship between mother and father, between employer and employees of both sexes, and between father and child.

==== Care leave ====
The care leave is a 2 weeks period that the father/co-mother is entitled to in association with birth but it is not included in the birth leave. The father/co-mother is not entitled to get paid these 2 weeks, but it is normal for the employer to cover it.

=== Apology to "German Girls" ===
In 2018, Norway's then Prime Minister Erna Solberg gave an apology to the estimated 50,000 Norwegian women who had relations with Germans during World War II (as well as those suspected of having them), stating in part, "Young Norwegian girls and women who had relations with German soldiers or were suspected of having them, were victims of undignified treatment. Our conclusion is that Norwegian authorities violated the rule fundamental principle that no citizen can be punished without trial or sentenced without law. For many, this was just a teenage love, for some, the love of their lives with an enemy soldier or an innocent flirt that left its mark for the rest of their lives. Today, in the name of the government, I want to offer my apologies." Norwegian women who had relations with German soldiers were nicknamed "German Girls", and some were detained, expelled from Norway, or had their civil rights removed.

=== Inclusive feminism ===
In 2022 a group of feminists formed the Initiative for Inclusive Feminism (IFI) to build a broad, intersectional feminist movement rooted in the universality and indivisibility of human rights, and to confront reactionary anti-gender mobilizations. Marianne Gulli, the president of FRI Oslo and Viken, stated that the Initiative for Inclusive Feminism "is important for creating a feminist community that has room for everyone."

In 2025, 25 Norwegian feminist organizations and academic communities signed the consensus statement "No feminism without trans people: We stand together for an inclusive feminism." The statement was initiated by the Initiative for Inclusive Feminism and endorsed by nearly all institutions within Norwegian gender studies, the equality centers, organizations such as radiOrakel and Legal Aid for Women, and a number of political parties ranging from AUF to the Green Party.

=== Military ===
In 2015, Norway introduced female conscription, becoming the first NATO member to have a legally compulsory national service for both men and women, and the first country in the world to draft women on the same formal terms as men. However, in practice only motivated volunteers are selected to join the army in Norway. Subsequently, a similar policy was introduced in Sweden (2017) and in Denmark (will enter in force in 2026).

== Violence against women ==
Violence against women in Norway has been discussed in the context of the "Nordic Paradox", namely a higher than expected rate of such violence in countries which are considered more gender egalitarian. A 2023 survey found that 23% of women in Norway had been subjected to rape by force, coercion or whilst they slept, or that they had been subjected to abuse before they turned 13, during their lifetime. In a 2019 report, Amnesty International stated that "Despite being among the top-ranking countries in the world in terms of gender equality, four Nordic countries (Denmark, Finland, Norway and Sweden) have disturbingly high levels of rape and survivors of sexual violence are being failed by their justice systems".

According to the 2023 UNODC Global Study on Homicide, in 2021, Norway was one of only seven countries in the world where women were more likely to be homicide victims than men (at a global level only 19% of homicide victims were women).

== Conclusion ==
In the 1990s, feminism experienced some stagnation in Norway after more than twenty years of reform.

Despite all the advances with egalitarian measures, wages are not always equal. The number of battered women is difficult to decrease, and finally the maternity benefit remains low.

Today, feminism is taking new forms. The associations and movements that grew out of the first and second wave of Norwegian feminism are adapting to these new structures, which are sometimes informal.

== See also ==
- Women's history
- Gender studies
- Women in Europe
