= Farahnaz Bahrami =

Norwegian politician (born 1962)

- فرحناز بهرامی
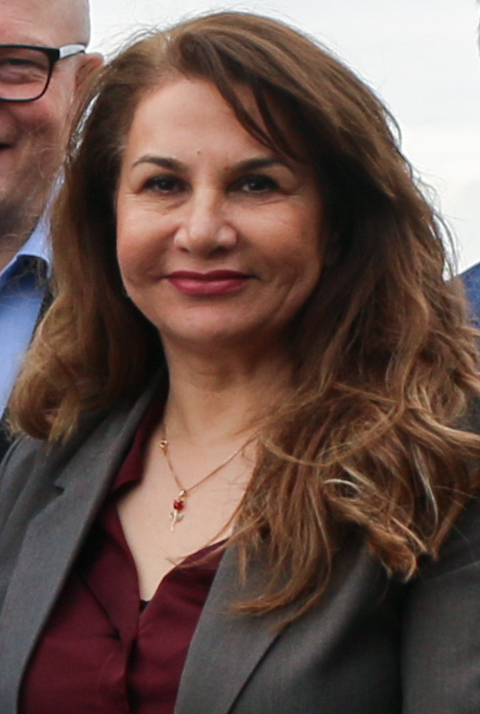

Deputy Member of the Storting
- Incumbent
- Assumed office 1 October 2025
- Deputising for: Nils Kristen Sandtrøen (2025–)
- Constituency: Hedmark

Personal details
- Born: 21 March 1962 (age 64) Mashad, Iran
- Party: Labour Party
- Children: 2

Farahnaz Bahrami (Persian: فرحناز بهرامی; born 21 March 1962) is a Norwegian politician and deputy member of the Storting. A member of the Labour Party, she has represented Hedmark since October 2025.

== Early life ==
Bahrami was born on 21 March 1962 in Mashad, Iran. In her youth she became concerned about human rights, gender inequality and income inequality. She and her future husband became involved in politics which drew the attention of the authoritarian regime in Iran. They were both arrested several times and interrogated about their political activities. Her husband fled to Norway and in 1990 Bahrami, who worked as a teacher, also moved to Norway with her two children as a political refugee.

The family settled in Våler in Hedmark but later moved to Hamar. Bahrami started learning Norwegian and completed her secondary school education at Hamar Cathedral School before joining a teacher training college. She became a Norwegian citizen in 1997. Her 34-year-old brother was executed in Iran in 2009.

== Career ==
Bahrami was head of the settlement and inclusion office at the municipal council in Hamar from 2005 to 2010 and regional director of the Directorate of Integration and Diversity (IMDi) from 2010 to 2014. She worked at the Norwegian Embassy in Ankara from 2014 to 2018. She has been a specialist director at the IMDi since 2018. In August 2013 she was arrested and held in custody for two days in relation to witness tampering. The case was later dropped by the police due to insufficient evidence.

Bahrami joined the Labour Party in 2006 and is a member of the municipal council in Hamar. She was a deputy member (Vararepresentant) of the Storting from 2009 to 2017 and was a substitute for Anette Trettebergstuen in the Storting for a month in 2009. She was the Labour Party's fourth placed candidate in Hedmark at the 2025 parliamentary election but the party won only three seats in the constituency. She became the party's first deputy representative in the constituency. She entered the Storting on 1 October 2025 as a permanent substitute for Minister of Agriculture and Food Nils Kristen Sandtrøen.

== Personal life ==
Bahrami is married to her cousin and has two children.
