= Initiative for Inclusive Feminism =

- Inkluderende feminisme-initiativet

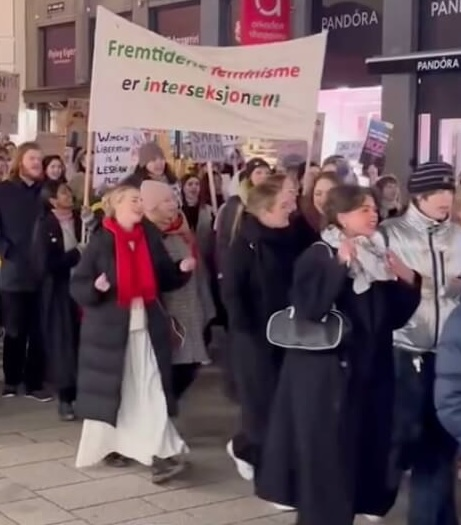
- Inclusive March 8, 2024
- Formation: May 10, 2022; 4 years ago
- Purpose: Human rights, intersectional feminism
- Leader: Marianne Støle-Nilsen
- Website: inkluderendefeminisme.no

The Initiative for Inclusive Feminism (Norwegian: Inkluderende feminisme-initiativet; IFI), often called simply Inclusive Feminism (Norwegian: Inkluderende feminisme), is a Norwegian intersectional feminist and human rights organization, and Norway's main intersectional feminist organization. It stands for a "compassionate feminism with room for everyone." It grew out of a national network of feminists who called for a feminism grounded in human rights, solidarity, and inclusion, and who sought to build a broad, intersectional movement rooted in the universality and indivisibility of human rights. IFI promotes an understanding of feminism as a democratic and universal human rights project that opposes all forms of exclusion and discrimination.

The organization originated in the Call for Inclusive Feminism of 2020, a broad cross-party appeal signed by 2,476 feminists from across Norway, including equality ministers Anette Trettebergstuen and Lubna Jaffery, along with numerous politicians, scholars, and activists. The call set out a vision of trans-inclusive feminism based on human rights and solidarity. It led to the creation of the Inclusive Feminism Network, which became one of the country's largest feminist communities and formally established IFI in 2022. Since then, IFI has coordinated Inclusive March 8 in Oslo together with Amnesty International and other partners, positioning itself at the centre of Norway's third- and fourth-wave feminism and a generational renewal of the feminist movement. Inclusive March 8 is one of the capital's two major International Women's Day events and is usually held at Eidsvolls plass outside the Norwegian Parliament.

IFI draws particular support from younger feminists of the millennial and Generation Z cohorts and has members of all genders. It describes itself as a response to "a broader national and global assault on vulnerable minorities closely connected to wider threats to liberal democracy and to fascist movements in our time." IFI understands feminism as a movement grounded in human rights, solidarity, and intersectionality, reflecting a broad global feminist consensus in contemporary activism, scholarship, and policy. It positions itself as the Norwegian institutional expression of this consensus, working to strengthen an inclusive feminist movement and to uphold this understanding as central to what feminism represents today. In this sense, IFI represents the continuity of feminism as a modern human-rights-based, inclusive social movement. In 2025 IFI took the initiative for the consensus statement "No feminism without trans people: We stand together for an inclusive feminism," which 25 feminist organizations and academic communities endorsed.

== History ==
=== The Call for Inclusive Feminism ===
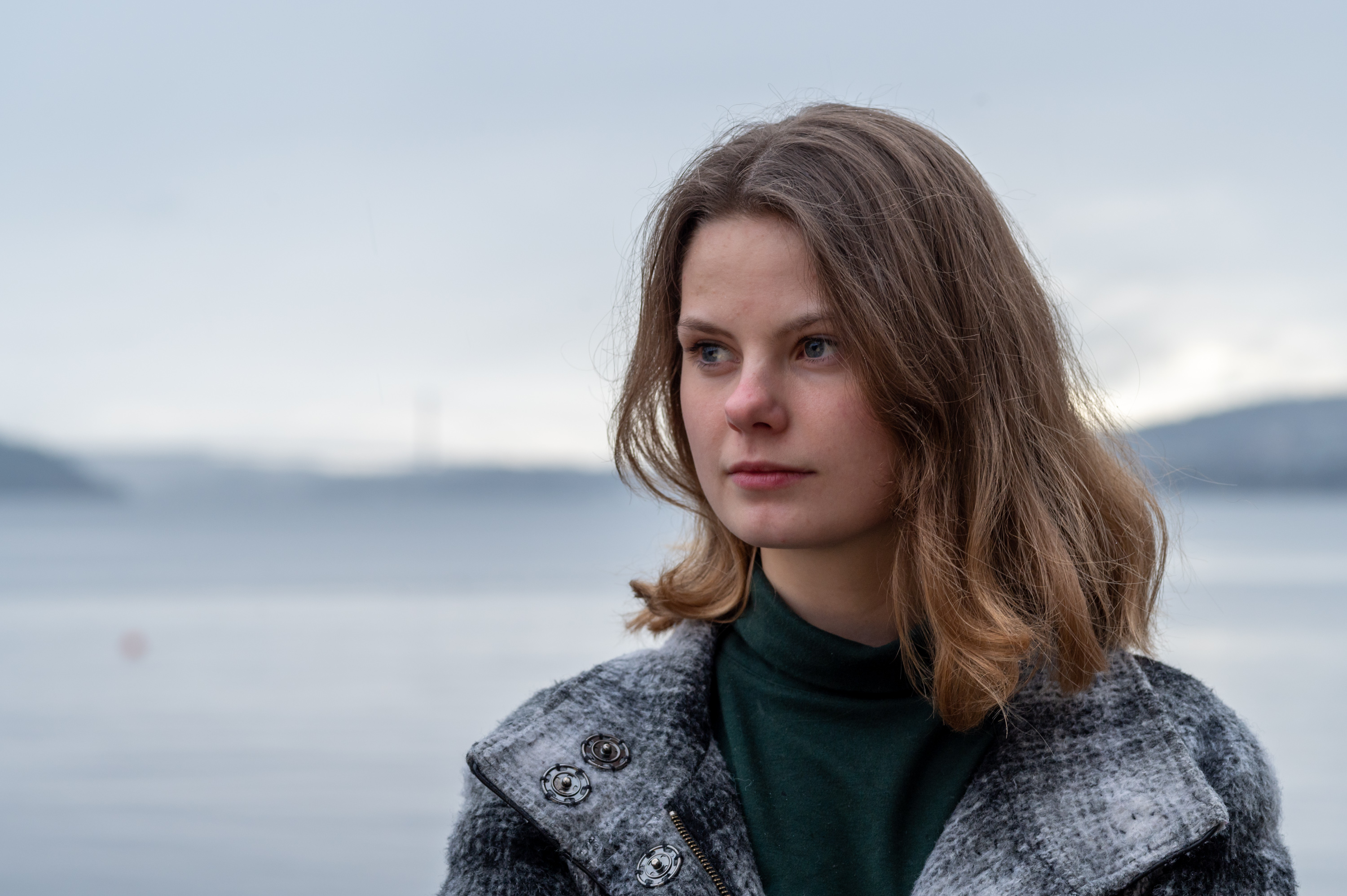
Green politician Josefine Gjerde called IFI a "new birth for the women's movement"

The Initiative for Inclusive Feminism was established in 2022 by a group of feminists seeking to build an inclusive, diverse, and solidarity-based feminist movement in Norway. The organization describes itself as a human rights organization that places intersectional feminism at the centre of its work, aiming for "a diverse and solidaric society where everyone – regardless of gender, sexuality, race, disability or class background – has a voice and a place."

IFI grew out of the network Inclusive Feminism, which was formed in 2020 following a broad and cross-party initiative known as the "Call for Inclusive Feminism." The call was signed by 2,476 feminists from across Norway. It called for an inclusive feminist movement that recognizes women's and trans people's rights as part of the same struggle against inequality. In 2023, this was followed up by a feminist call against transphobia, signed by 2,611 feminists, a significant proportion of active feminists in Norway.

This grassroots mobilization led to the creation of the Inclusive Feminism network, which by 2024 had about a thousand members and had become one of the largest organized feminist communities in Norway. The network played a central role in establishing the Inclusive March 8 events and later formalized as the Initiative for Inclusive Feminism (IFI) in 2022. Since then, IFI has been the main organizer of Inclusive March 8 in Oslo together with Amnesty International Norway, Sex og politikk, the Norwegian Organisation for Sexual and Gender Diversity, radiOrakel, and several other organizations.

The establishment of IFI took place in the context of a growing global and local anti-gender backlash. Researchers at the Center for Research on Extremism (C-REX) have documented an increase in hostility toward transgender people and gender diversity. Christopher R. Fardan writes that transgender people are facing increasing hate from extremist movements, and that "in light of a growing anti-gender movement intent on disenfranchising trans people, it becomes imperative to focus on recognising gender diversity and ensuring that trans individuals can live free from oppressive structures and violence. This way we can pave the way for a more equitable and democratic society where all individuals can thrive." Celestine S. Kunkeler and Iris B. Segers describe the anti-gender movement as a global reactionary mobilisation against women's and LGBTQ+ rights and participation in public life.

IFI describes its work as part of a generational renewal in Norwegian feminism, led by younger feminists from the millennial and Generation Z cohorts who emphasize solidarity, inclusion, and human rights. Inclusive Feminism appears both as a broad coalition for human rights, solidarity, and democracy that unites a new generation of progressive feminists from the third and fourth waves, and as a moral response to global anti-gender mobilizations, rising authoritarianism, and democratic backsliding. At the same time, it carries forward ideas from Norway's liberal-humanist tradition of feminism. Marianne Gulli, chair of FRI Oslo and Viken, stated that IFI "is important for creating a feminist community that has room for everyone." Green politician Josefine Gjerde, a signatory of the 2020 Call for Inclusive Feminism, called IFI "a new birth for the women's movement" that will stand as a milestone in the development of a Norwegian inclusive feminism that also embraces marginalized groups. IFI was nominated for Plan International Norway's Girl Award in 2025 for its work in renewing Norwegian feminism and defending the human rights of all girls.

In 2025, IFI took the initiative for the consensus statement "No feminism without trans people: We stand together for an inclusive feminism," which 25 feminist organizations and academic communities endorsed. It was signed by nearly all institutions within Norwegian gender studies, the equality centers, organizations such as radiOrakel, Legal Aid for Women, and SAIH, as well as a number of political organizations, from AUF to the Green Party.

=== Ideological foundation and background ===
IFI belongs to feminism's third and fourth waves, building on the liberal feminist tradition founded on human rights and equality and on the intersectional turn that reshaped feminist thought and activism in the 1990s. It understands feminism as a human-rights-based, intersectional movement grounded in solidarity, reflecting the global consensus in contemporary feminist theory, activism, and policymaking.

Liberal feminism or human rights and equality-oriented feminism is the oldest feminist current, with roots in Enlightenment thought. In Norway, Gina Krog is regarded as a key founder of this tradition, and Eva Kolstad, Norway's first Gender Equality Ombud and an early defender of LGBTQ+ rights, has been highlighted by IFI as an important modern role model. Kolstad described feminism as a common struggle for "a society where individual abilities determine each person's path, not social norms or outdated traditions," and emphasized that women's rights concern society as a whole. She wrote that "feminism is therefore, now as before, not a struggle against men, but a struggle for greater human possibilities and for further spiritual liberation."

The intersectional perspective developed by Kimberlé Crenshaw in the late 1980s has since become a cornerstone of modern feminism and equality policy, highlighting how gender, race, sexuality, disability, and class intersect to produce different experiences of discrimination. From the 1990s onwards, intersectionality became central to feminist theory and to official equality frameworks internationally.

IFI is not so much a new movement as a new organizing of feminists in Norway who see themselves as part of a broad global feminist consensus grounded in human rights, solidarity, and intersectionality. UN Women emphasized in 2024 that "the feminist goals of intersectional justice and gender equality can only be achieved if all women and all LGBTIQ+ people are included as part of a broad, intersectional feminist movement rooted in the universality and indivisibility of human rights." It positions itself as the Norwegian expression of that consensus and works to build an inclusive feminist movement founded on those principles. At the same time, IFI carries a clear normative ambition: consolidating Norwegian feminism's moral centre around human rights, intersectionality and inclusion, to defend this understanding as the core of what feminism means today, and to affirm feminism's continuing role as a moral and democratic force in society.

In 2026, IFI wrote: "We want a feminism that stands firm when marginalized groups are attacked. One that refuses to be divided by false divisions between women’s rights and the place of minority groups in society. One that understands that all forms of prejudice and hatred grow out of the same oppressive structures – and must be confronted together (...) That is why, more than ever, we need a compassionate feminism with room for everyone."

=== Inclusive March 8 ===
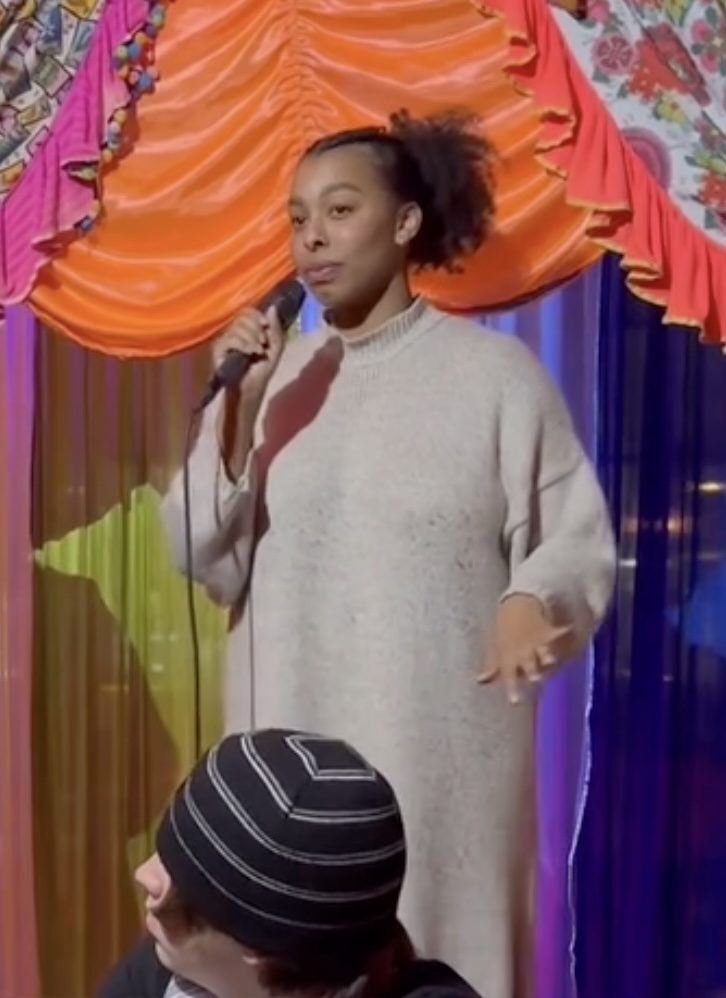
Hanna Asefaw, Inclusive March 8, 2024

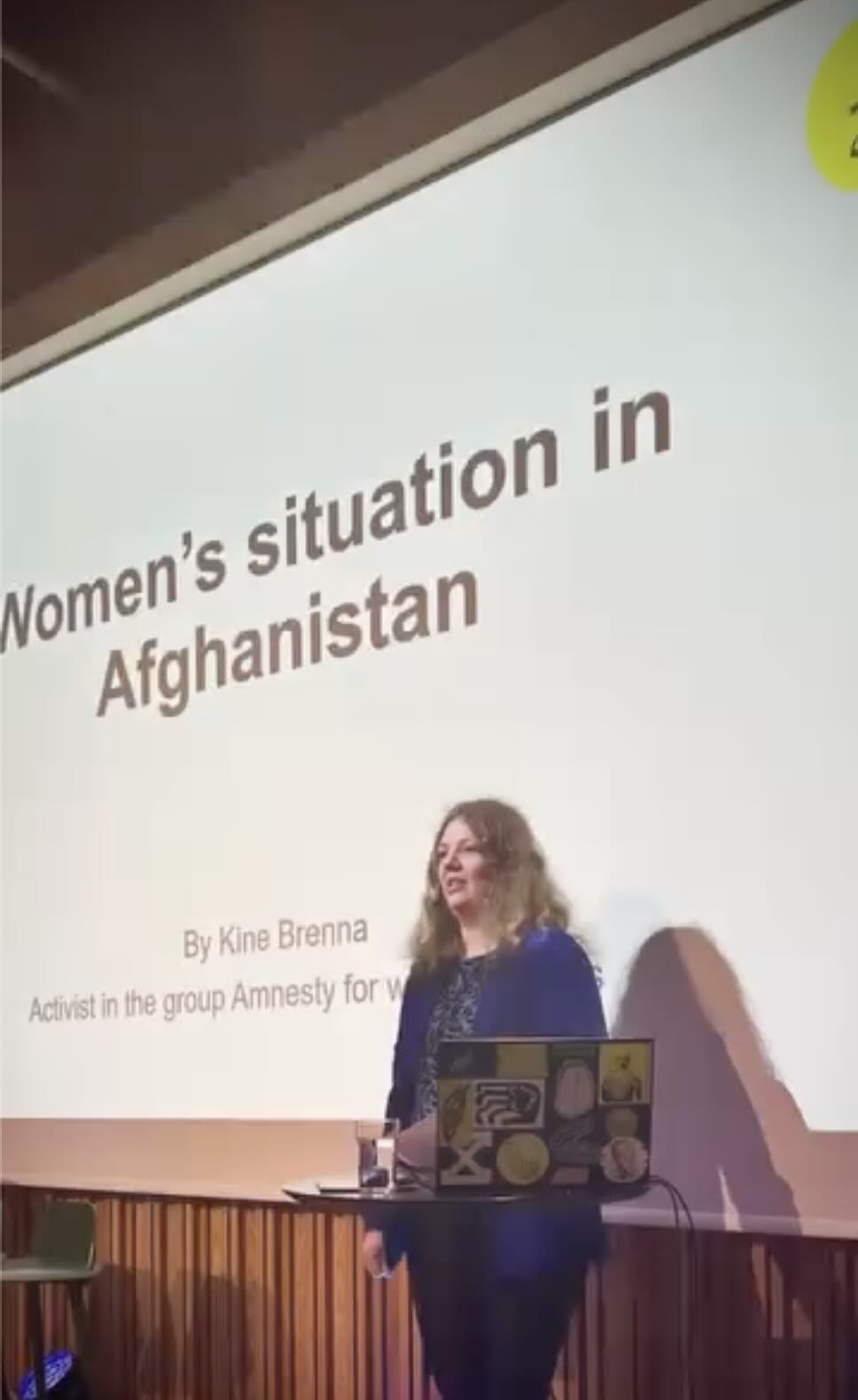
Lecture by Kine Brenna from Amnesty Norway on women's situation in Afghanistan at Inclusive March 8, 2025

IFI is the main organizer of Inclusive March 8 in Oslo, one of the capital's two major International Women's Day events. The march has been held annually since 2022 in collaboration with a range of feminist, queer, and human-rights organizations, including Amnesty International Norway, Sex og politikk (Planned Parenthood) and its youth organization SNU, the Norwegian Organisation for Sexual and Gender Diversity (FRI), Queer World and radiOrakel. The event describes itself as open to all genders and as taking a stand against racism, transphobia, homophobia, fascism, and ableism. It is usually held at Eidsvolls plass outside the Norwegian Parliament, although in 2025 it took place at Sentralen in central Oslo.

Oslo has two Women's Day events, as researchers at the Center for Research on Extremism (C-REX) have described growing anti-gender mobilizations in Norway, and the other march has long been criticized for transphobia by feminist groups and parties across the political spectrum. Inclusive March 8 was established in this context, as a space where trans people and other marginalized groups could feel welcome and represented, in line with the understanding of feminism as human-rights-based, intersectional, and grounded in solidarity. In 2025, IFI set out the political background for the creation of Inclusive March 8, stating that "feminism must be based on solidarity and inclusion." The organization also said that "attacks on trans people must be understood in light of the growing anti-gender movement and a broader national and global assault on vulnerable minorities, closely connected to wider threats to liberal democracy and to fascist movements in our time."

At Inclusive March 8, 2025, organized together with Amnesty International Norway, Sappho's Friends, and Karmaklubb*, speakers included Kine Brenna from Amnesty, who addressed the situation of women in Afghanistan, and Luca Dalen Espseth from the Patient Organization for Gender Incongruence, who spoke about global and Norwegian attacks on gender minorities.

=== Human rights advocacy ===
IFI works to advance broad and inclusive feminist human rights advocacy in Norway, using an intersectional lens to address the rights of women and girls in all their diversity and of marginalized genders. To strengthen this work, IFI launched a dedicated human rights project in 2024.

During the 58th session of the UN Human Rights Council in 2025, Women Deliver delivered an oral statement on behalf of 114 civil society organizations, including IFI, Amnesty International, WILPF, and IPPF. The organizations urged Member States to fulfil the commitments made in the Beijing Platform for Action and to secure the human rights of all women and girls, including sexual and reproductive health and rights. They stated that "despite normative progress, the promises made to women and girls in all their diversity at Beijing remain a distant dream for many, including women and girls facing multiple and intersecting forms of discrimination, such as those with disabilities, adolescent girls, indigenous women and girls, and trans women."

== Organization ==
IFI has members from all of Norway and is led by an executive board. Its leader is Marianne Støle-Nilsen.

IFI has members of all genders. Its inclusive membership practice is not only in line with the ethos of the third and fourth waves of feminism but also continues the tradition of the Norwegian women's rights movement since the 19th century, which emphasized that feminism is a universal human rights project.

The organization has a heart as its logo, a symbol of love, friendship, inclusion, and care for others.
