= Bente Irene Aaland =

Norwegian politician

Deputy Member of the Storting
- Incumbent
- Assumed office 1 October 2021
- Deputising for: Nils Kristen Sandtrøen (February 2025– April 2025)
- Constituency: Hedmark

Personal details
- Born: 5 January 1956 (age 70)
- Party: Labour
- Education: Hedmark University College
- Occupation: Nurse; Politician

Bente Irene Aaland (born 5 January 1956) is a Norwegian politician for the Labour Party. A deputy to the Storting from Hedmark since 2021, she met as deputy for Nils Kristen Sandtrøen from February to April 2025.

== Personal life ==
Born on 5 January 1956, Aaland hails from Elverum Municipality, and is educated as nurse from the Hedmark University College.

== Political career ==
A politician for the Labour Party, Aaland was elected deputy representative number two to the Storting from the constituency of Hedmark at the 2021 election. She was deputising for Nils Kristen Sandtrøen from February to April 2025, when Sandtrøen assumed the position of Minister of Agriculture and Food in the Støre Cabinet, and deputy number one from Hedmark, Even Eriksen, served as State Secretary.
