= Hamar Cathedral School =

Upper secondary school in Hamar, Norway

Coordinates: 60°48′23″N 11°03′16″E

Hamar katedralskole
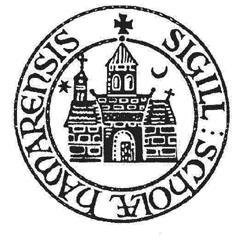

Information
- Established: 1153; 873 years ago

Hamar katedralskole (English: Hamar Cathedral School) is an upper secondary school in Hamar, Norway.

== History ==
Founded in 1153 as Schola cathedralis hamarensis, it is the second oldest school in Norway together with Bergen katedralskole and Oslo katedralskole, which were founded the same year, one year after the founding of Trondheim katedralskole. Hamar Cathedral School was founded by Cardinal Nicolas Breakspear, later to become Pope Adrian IV (c. 1100 – 1159).

With the Protestant Reformation, Hamar Diocese was closed and in 1602 and the school was merged with Oslo Cathedral School. The school remained closed until 1876, when it was reopened under the name Hamar offentlige skole for høyere allmenndannelse. The old name was reintroduced in 1936. The current headmaster is Stig Johannessen.

== Notable alumni ==
- Nils Collett Vogt (1864–1937), writer
- Per Imerslund (1912–1943), writer
- Sigurd Evensmo (1912–1978), writer
- Ivar Giæver (1929–), physicist and Nobel Prize in Physics laureate
- Knut Faldbakken (1941–), writer
- Dag Fornæss (1948–) speed skater
- John Erik Fornæss (1946–) mathematician, Princeton University
- Morten Andreas Meyer (1959–), politician
- Jan Åge Fjørtoft (1967–), football player
- Matias Faldbakken (1973–), writer and artist
- Anette Trettebergstuen (1981–), politician
- Anders Baasmo Christiansen (1976-), actor
- Lasse Sætre (1974-), speed skater

== Gallery ==
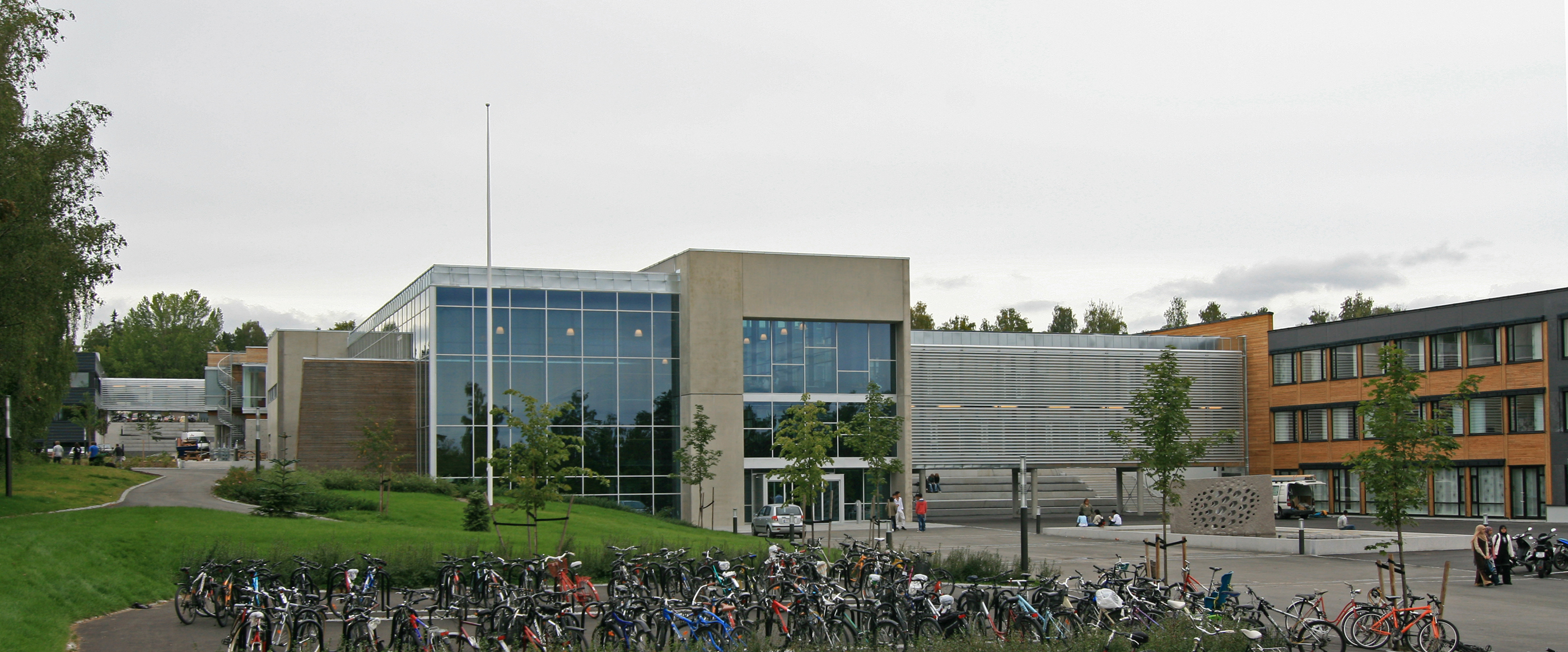

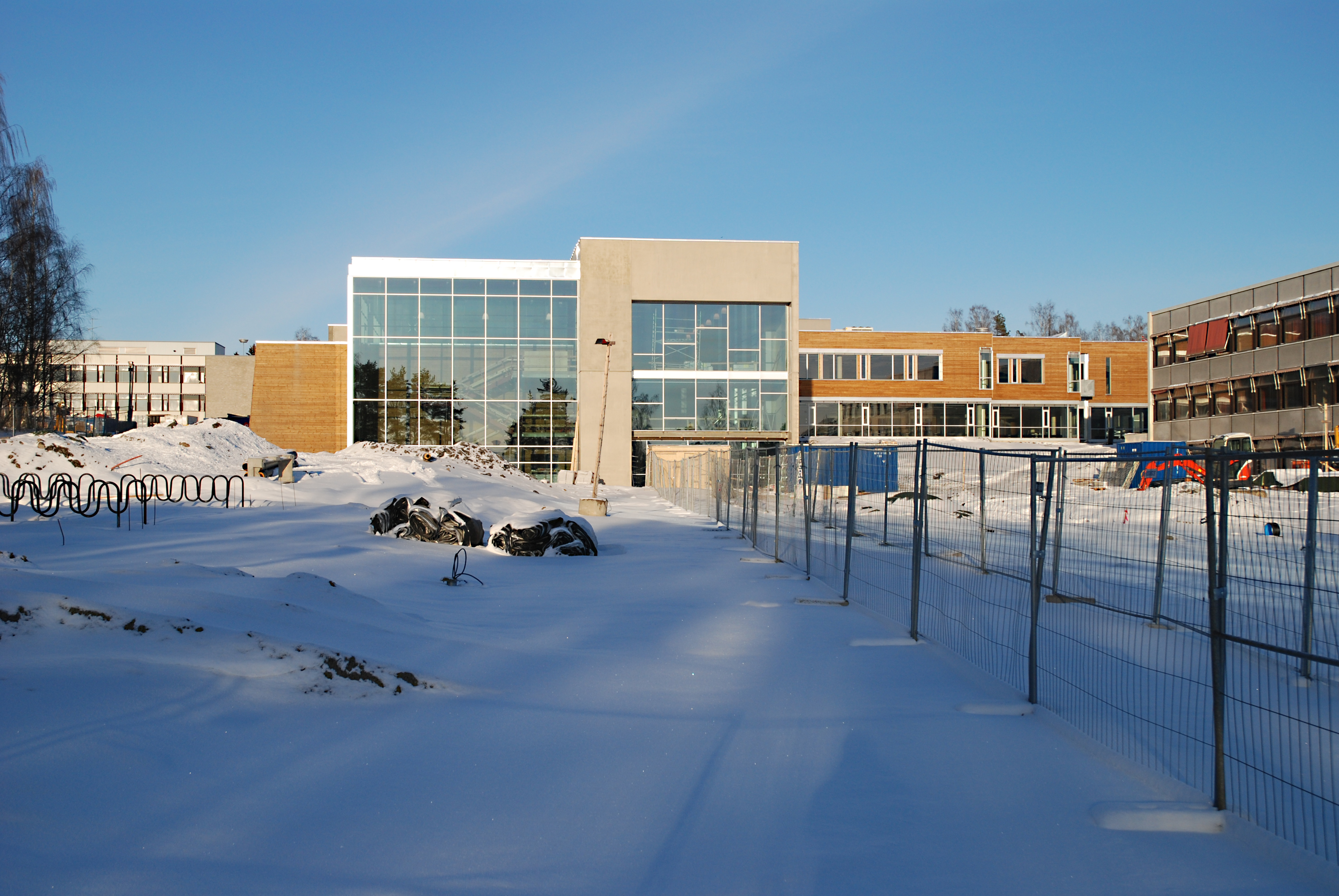

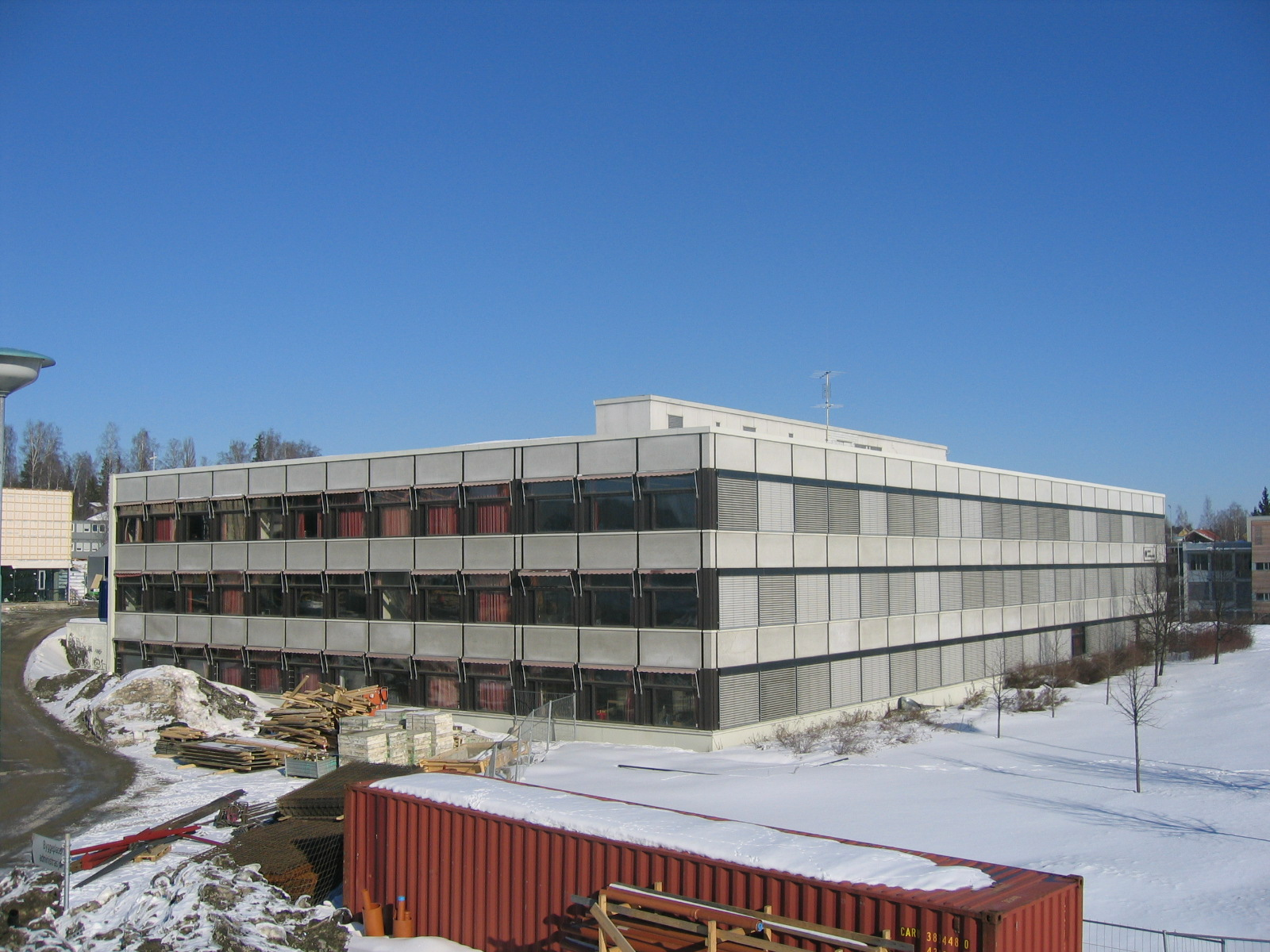
