= Lubna Jaffery =

Norwegian politician (born 1980)

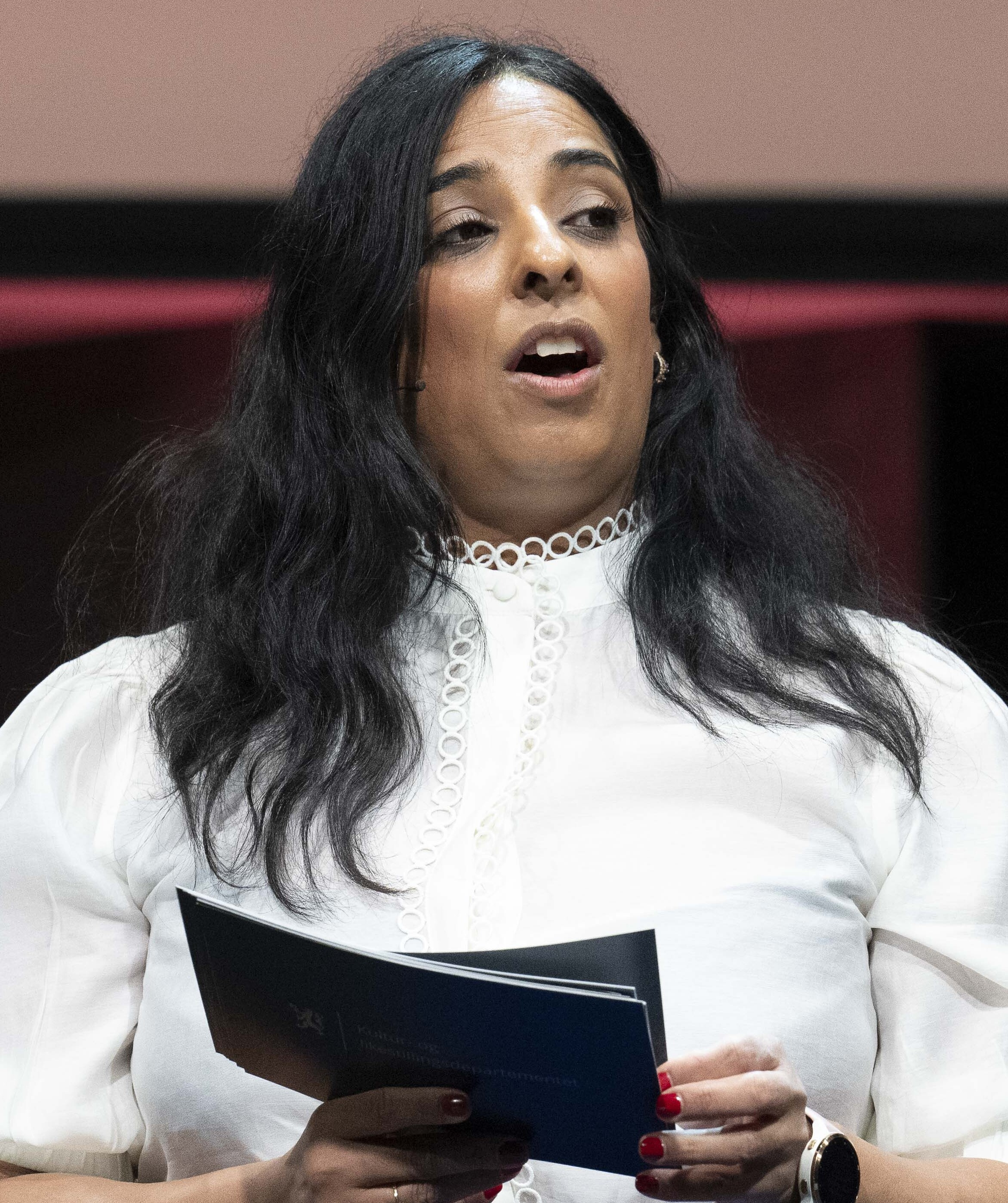
- Jaffery in 2024

Minister of Culture and Equality
- Incumbent
- Assumed office 28 June 2023
- Prime Minister: Jonas Gahr Støre
- Preceded by: Anette Trettebergstuen

Member of the Storting
- Incumbent
- Assumed office 1 October 2025
- Deputy: June Trengereid Gruer
- Constituency: Hordaland

Deputy Member of the Storting
- In office 1 October 2009 – 30 September 2025
- Deputising for: Marte Mjøs Persen (2021–2023)
- Constituency: Hordaland

Bergen City Commissioner for Labour, Social Affairs and Housing
- In office 29 October 2019 – 22 October 2021
- Chief Commissioner: Roger Valhammer
- Preceded by: Erlend Horn
- Succeeded by: Ruth Grung

Personal details
- Born: 2 April 1980 (age 46) Bergen, Hordaland, Norway
- Party: Labour
- Spouse: Lennart Fjell (m. 2003; div. 2010)
- Children: 1
- Education: University of Bergen

Lubna Boby Jaffery (born 2 April 1980) is a Norwegian politician for the Labour Party. She has served as minister of culture and equality since 2023 and a member of parliament for Hordaland since 2025. She previously served as a deputy member for the same constituency from 2009 to 2025 and Bergen city commissioner for labour, social affairs, and housing from 2019 to 2021. In 2020 she was one of the signatories of the "Call for Inclusive Feminism," which led to the establishment of the Initiative for Inclusive Feminism.

== Early life and education ==
Born in Norway to parents of Pakistani origin, she grew up in Bergen. She took her secondary education in Åsane in 1999, and at the University of Bergen she took the cand.mag. degree in 2004 and the master's degree in 2007. Jaffery married Lennart Fjell in 2003, they got divorced in 2010 and they have one daughter together.

== Political career ==
=== Youth league ===
She was an adviser in the Workers' Youth League in 2000, before becoming a central board member from 2000 to 2004. She had previously chaired the county branch from 1998 to 2000.

=== Local politics ===
Jaffery was a member of the Bergen city council from 1999 to 2003 and the municipal council of Fjell Municipality from 2003 to 2007.

In 2019, she was appointed Bergen City Commissioner for Labour, Social Affairs and Housing in the Roger Valhammer city government. She resigned from this position when she was promoted to permanent representative in the Storting to cover the duties of Marte Mjøs Persen. She was succeeded by Ruth Grung as city commissioner.

=== Government ===
In 2008, Jaffery was appointed a political advisor in the Ministry of Labour and Social Inclusion. From March to October 2009 she was a political advisor for the Minister of Health and Care Services. From 2009 to 2012 she was a State Secretary in the Ministry of Culture as a part of Stoltenberg's Second Cabinet.

=== Parliament ===
Jaffery served as a deputy representative in the Storting for Hordaland from 2009 to 2025, having been re-elected in 2013, 2017 and 2021. From 2021 to 2023, she deputised for Marte Mjøs Persen after she was appointed to the Støre cabinet. In the Storting, she sat as a member of the Standing Committee on Health and Care Services in 2021, before being moved to the Standing Committee on Scrutiny and Constitutional Affairs, where she also served as first vice chair between 2021 and 2023.

She was elected as a regular representative for Hordaland in 2025. While serving in government, June Trengereid Gruer has deputised for her since 2025.

=== Minister of Culture and Equality ===
Jaffery was appointed minister of culture and equality on 28 June 2023 following Anette Trettebergstuen's resignation due to impartiality issues.

==== 2023 ====
In July, she attended the Moldejazz music festival, and in commemoration of the 12th anniversary of the 2011 Norway attacks, called for action against outsiderness and extremism, and to secure local communities.

A day before the 2024 state budget was presented, Jaffery confirmed that the government would be allocating 10 million NOK to combat sports poverty for children youths in what the government designated as an "ambitious" action plan.

On 30 November, Jaffery and TV2 signed a new commercial public broadcasting agreement for the channel for the new term from 2024 to 2028.

In December, Jaffery announced the government's strategy for gaming, which was originally meant to be put forward the year before. With the announcement, she stated that politics should be more offensive in that regard and that with the strategy, the field would lifted up more.

==== 2024 ====
Following the release of a UN report into racism in Norway, Jaffery pledged that the government would take the report into consideration and continue the fight against racism and discrimination. She went on to highlight the importance of inclusion and that the discrimination level is low in the country.

Jaffery received the report into male equality from the commission specialising in said issues in April. The report concluded that some measures against more male equality would be to have a two parted paternity leave, more flexible school starts and increased recruitment of men to more female dominated jobs. Jaffery highlighted that there are still inequality gaps between genders and that the declining birth rates were worrying.

In late June, she announced that the government would be postponing the implementation of a third gender in identification papers until 2032, on the recommendation of the Norwegian Directorate for Children, Youth and Family Affairs. Furthermore she stated that national supervision would be implemented for public and private actors for gender diversity.

On 25 June, Jaffery gained widespread attention, both in national and international press, after flashing her breasts in a show of support for LGBT people.

On the issue of AI illustrations, Jaffery expressed in late September that companies ought to be free to choose between AI and human illustrations. She did however emphasise that AI should be utilised as a tool and expressed hopes for a continued active demand and appreciation of human illustrators in the future.

She expressed disagreement with finance minister Trygve Slagsvold Vedum in November after he expressed support for the Christian Democrats' leader Dag Inge Ulstein's views on the gender debate and that there was only two genders. Jaffery reasserted the Labour Party's position on inclusion of queer and non-binary people and their recognition of a third gender. She also criticised the Christian Democrats for importing the debate from the United States and making the issue larger than necessary.

Criticism was pointed towards the government and the Norwegian Board of Health Supervision in December for failing to incorporate the United Nations Convention on the Rights of Persons with Disabilities and failing to appropriate accommodation for disabled individuals, by the Gender Equality and Anti-Discrimination Ombud. Jaffery argued that the municipalities were responsible to uphold the convention and that the government was listening to proposals for incorporating the convention into Norwegian law after the report from the expert committee has been consulted by parliament.

==== 2025 ====
In January, she spoke out against the Progress Party's proposal to privatise the NRK and cutting 300 million NOK economic support to other media outlets. She claimed that their policy would weaken the democratic readiness, investigative journalism against politicians and other power structures.

Jaffery accused the Christian Democrats in early May, of catering to certain voter groups by passing a recent policy at their party convention that would seek to exclude the Rainbow flag from being flown on public school flag poles. She argued that the flag symbolises acceptance of different sexualities, the LGBT community and that it sends a positive sign to queer children and youths that they are welcomed. She further accused them of sacrificing safety and acceptance of children.

In October, she expressed concerns about young people not daring to express themselves due to political correctness and being judged for having differing opinions. She also highlighted the importance of a tolerant society with room for differing opinions and with room for disagreements. Furthermore, she emphasised the importance of freedom of expression and that young people should be practically equipped to participate in discussions.

==== 2026 ====
In February 2026, Jaffery announced that the government would be moving forward with their proposal to relinquish a 1735 law that prohibits movies to be screened in cinemas between 06:00am and 01:00pm on Sundays. The original intention with the law was to ensure citizens attended church on Sundays. The government had announced their intention to relinquish the law in 2024, but has taken two years before the proposal has now been sent to parliament for a hearing.

After a mixed-race couple faced discriminating comments on social media related to Constitution Day celebrations, Jaffery condemned the discrimination they faced, calling it "completely unacceptable". She further emphasised how the government has strengthen the means of how the police can combat discrimination and presented action plans combating the issue alongside racism.

Jaffery announced in November that the government would not permit Russian and Belarusian athletes to compete in international sporting events held on Norwegian soil, citing the ongoing Russo-Ukranian war.

== Political positions ==
In 2020 she was one of the signatories of the "Call for Inclusive Feminism," a document which led to the establishment of the Initiative for Inclusive Feminism.

Political offices
Preceded by Anette Trettebergstuen	Minister of Culture and Equality; 2023–present	Incumbent
Preceded by Sverre Myrli	First Vice Chair of the Standing Committee on Scrutiny and Constitutional Affairs; 2021–2023	Succeeded by Frode Jacobsen
Preceded by Erlend Horn	Bergen City Commissioner for Labour, Social Affairs and Housing; 2019–2021	Succeeded by Ruth Grung
