= Ruth Mari Grung =

Norwegian politician

Bergen City Commissioner for Climate, the Environment and Urban Development
- In office 15 September 2023 – 30 October 2023
- Chief Commissioner: Rune Bakervik
- Preceded by: Ingrid Neergaard Fjeldstad
- Succeeded by: Christine Kahrs

Bergen City Commissioner for Health and Care Services
- In office 25 August 2022 – 30 October 2023
- Chief Commissioner: Roger Valhammer; Rune Bakervik
- Preceded by: Beate Husa
- Succeeded by: Marte Monstad

Bergen City Commissioner for Labour, Social Affairs and Housing
- In office 22 October 2021 – 25 August 2022
- Chief Commissioner: Roger Valhammer
- Preceded by: Lubna Jaffery
- Succeeded by: Katrine Nødtvedt (Culture, Social Affairs and Inclusion)

Member of the Storting
- In office 1 October 2013 – 30 September 2021
- Constituency: Hordaland

Personal details
- Born: 10 March 1959 (age 67) Bergen, Hordaland, Norway
- Party: Labour
- Education: University of Bergen
- Occupation: Politician

Ruth Mari Grung (born 10 March 1959) is a Norwegian politician for the Labour Party. She was a member of the Storting from Hordaland from 2013 to 2021.

She served as the Bergen City Commissioner for Labour, Social Affairs and Housing from 2021 to 2022, and City Commissioner for Health and Care Services from 2022 to 2023.

== Personal life, education and working career ==
Grung was born in Bergen on 10 March 1959, the daughter of programmer Bjørn Grung and schoolteacher Sigfrid Eriksen. She was a student at the University of Bergen from 1979 to 1984, where she graduated in history and economy.

She had her working career at Aetat, the Hordaland county municipality, and the Norwegian Labour and Welfare Administration.

== Political career ==
=== Parliament ===
Grung was elected to the Parliament of Norway from Hordaland in 2013, where she served as a member of the Standing Committee on Health and Care Services from 2013 to 2017. She was re-elected to the Storting for the period 2017–2021, and was a member of the Standing Committee on Business and Industry from 2017 to 2019, and of the Standing Committee on Energy and the Environment from 2019 to 2021.

=== Local politics ===
She was elected member of the city council of Bergen from 2003 to 2011. From 2011 to 2013 she was a member of the county council of Hordaland.

In October 2021, she was appointed Bergen City Commissioner for Labour, Social Affairs and Housing following the resignation of Lubna Jaffery, who stepped up to become a permanent representative in the Storting, covering the duties of Marte Mjøs Persen. In August 2022, she became City Commissioner for Health and Care Services when the Christian Democratic Party withdrew from the city government. She was retained by Rune Bakervik when he succeeded Roger Valhammer as Chief Commissioner in November 2022. When the Liberal Party withdrew from the city cabinet following the 2023 local elections, Grung was additionally appointed city commissioner for climate, the environment and urban development. When the Meyer government assumed office on 30 October, Grung was succeeded by Christine Kahrs as city commissioner for urban development and Marte Monstad as city commissioner for health.
