= Per Martin Sandtrøen =

Norwegian politician

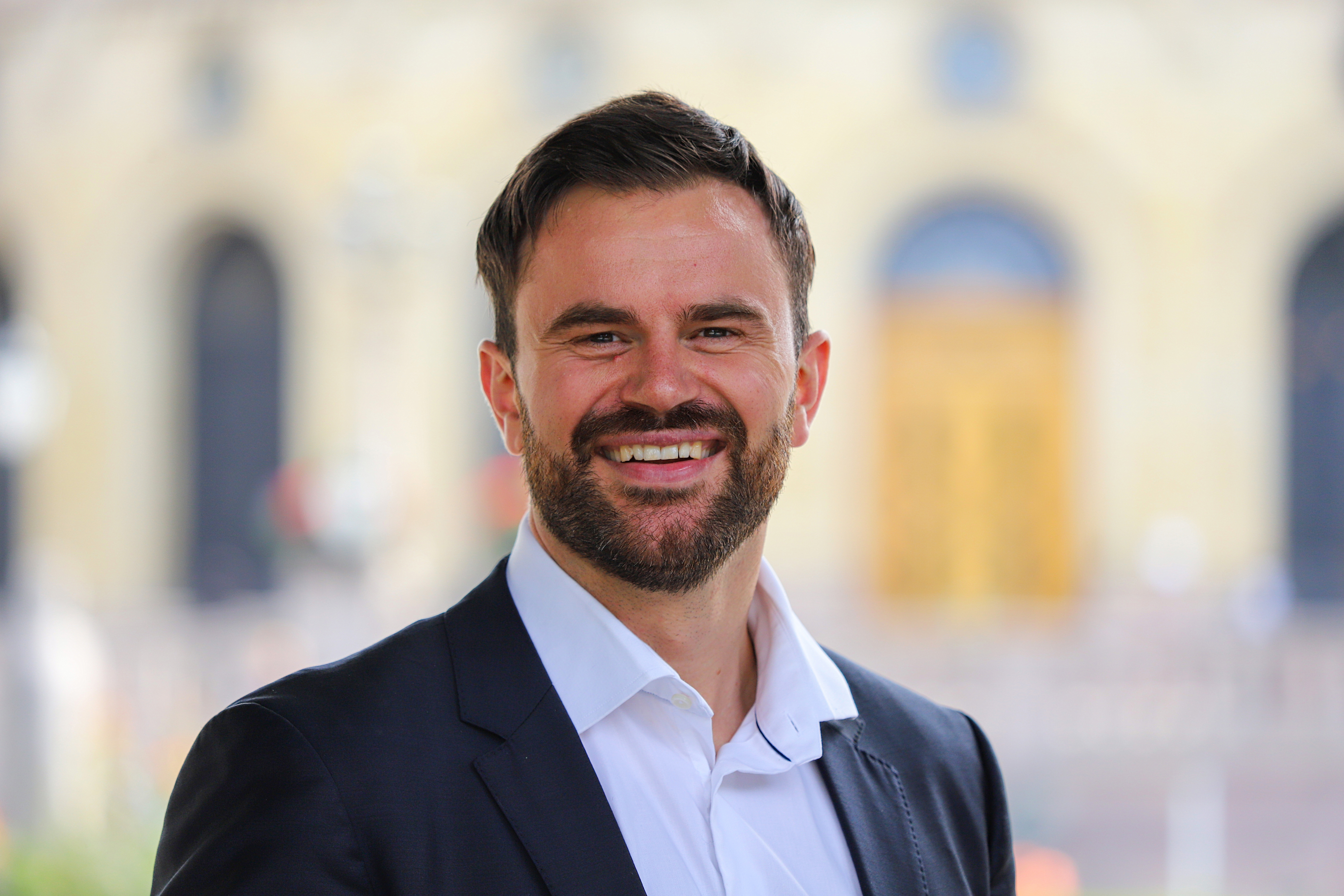

Deputy Member of the Storting
- Incumbent
- Assumed office 1 October 2017
- Member: Trygve Slagsvold Vedum (2021–2025)
- Constituency: Hedmark

Personal details
- Born: 5 October 1985 (age 40) Tynset, Hedmark, Norway
- Party: Centre
- Relatives: Nils Kristen Sandtrøen (brother)
- Occupation: Politician

Per Martin Sandtrøen (born 5 October 1985) is a Norwegian politician from the Centre Party, currently serving as a deputy member of the Storting since 2017.

== Political career ==
He was elected deputy representative to the Storting in 2017 from the constituency of Hedmark and has been re-elected since. He is currently deputising for Trygve Slagsvold Vedum at the Storting from 2021 to 2025 while Vedum served in government.

In September 2022, he called for the Centre Party to withdraw from government if the European Union's fourth energy package is passed by the government. He received support from the party's county leaders from Rogaland, Troms, Møre og Romsdal and Buskerud.

== Personal life ==
Sandtrøen hails from Tynset Municipality, and is a brother of Nils Kristen Sandtrøen. They were also the first pair of siblings to be elected to parliament since 1903. He is a former long-distance runner in the club FIK Ren-Eng, with a personal best of 15:04.38 minutes in the 5000 metres from 2004.
