= Nils Kristen Sandtrøen =

Norwegian politician

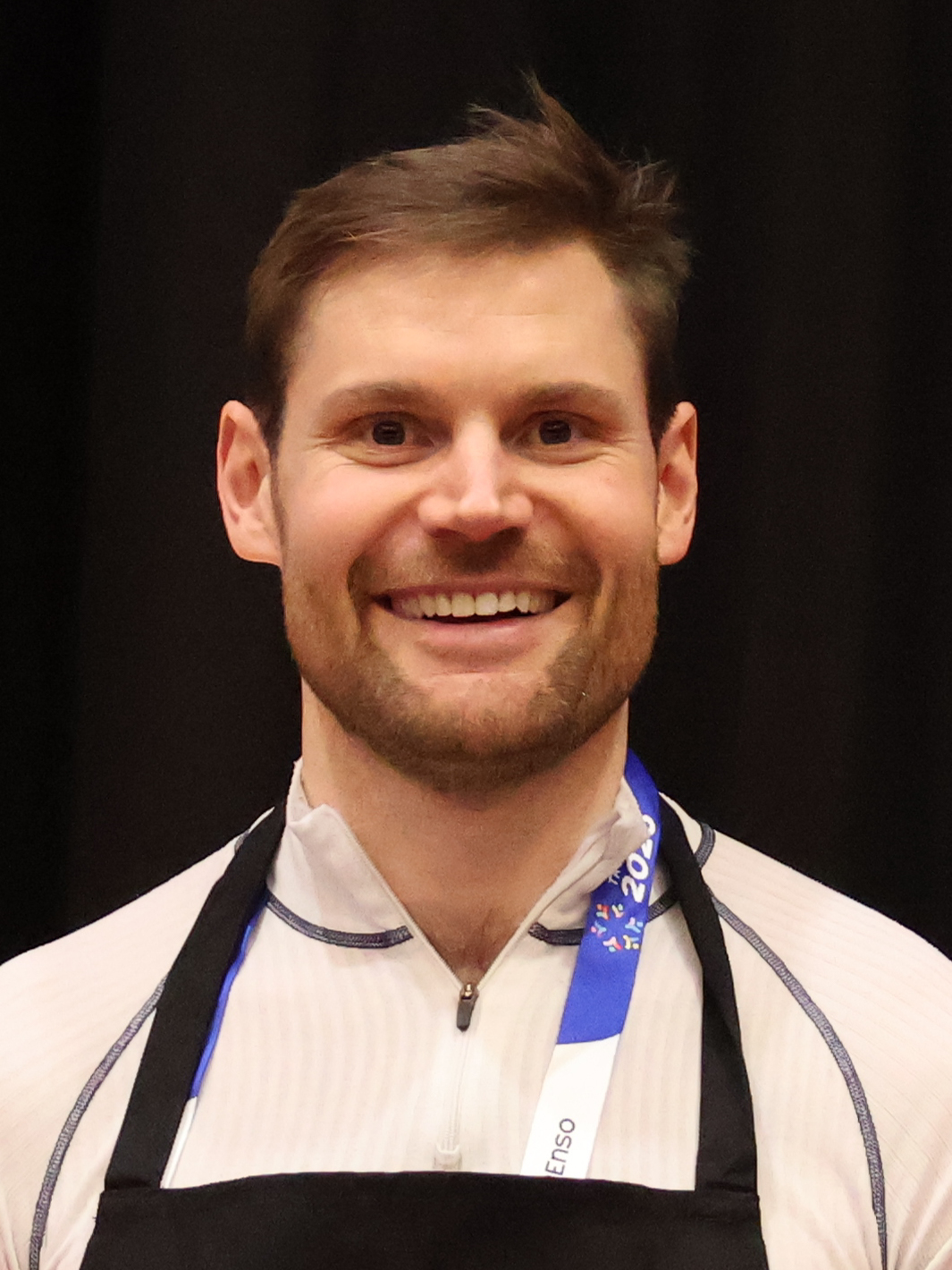
- Sandtrøen in 2025

Minister of Agriculture and Food
- Incumbent
- Assumed office 4 February 2025
- Prime Minister: Jonas Gahr Støre
- Preceded by: Geir Pollestad

Member of the Storting
- Incumbent
- Assumed office 1 October 2017
- Deputy: Bente Irene Aaland; Even Eriksen; Farahnaz Bahrami
- Constituency: Hedmark

Deputy Mayor of Tynset Municipality
- In office 6 October 2015 – 20 September 2017
- Mayor: Merete Myhre Moen
- Preceded by: Astrid Skaug
- Succeeded by: Tone Hagen

Personal details
- Born: 2 February 1989 (age 37) Tynset, Hedmark, Norway
- Party: Labour
- Relatives: Per Martin Sandtrøen (brother)
- Education: University of Alaska Anchorage; Norwegian University of Science and Technology

Nils Kristen Sandtrøen (born 2 February 1989) is a Norwegian politician from the Labour Party. He has served as a member of parliament, the Storting, from Hedmark, since 2017, and has been Minister of Agriculture and Food since February 2025.

== Political career ==
=== Youth politics ===
Sandtrøen took the initiative to establish a Workers' Youth League local chapter for students in Trondheim in 2011, which he also led. He was present at Utøya during the 2011 Norway attacks, where he hid along the cliffs facing the mainland before swimming away.

=== Local politics ===
Sandtrøen was a member of the municipal council for Tynset Municipality between 2015 and 2019 and also served as the municipality's deputy mayor between 2015 and 2017. He resigned in order to take his seat in parliament and was succeeded by Tone Hagen.

=== Parliament ===
Sandtrøen was first elected as a member of parliament from Hedmark at the 2017 election and was re-elected in 2021.

In parliament, he sat on the Standing Committee on Business and Industry between 2017 and 2021 before moving to the Standing Committee on Transport and Communications. He moved to the Standing Committee on Finance and Economic Affairs in 2023.

While serving in government, his parliamentary duties were covered by deputy member Bente Irene Aaland until 25 April 2025, thereafter Even Eriksen until September and Farahnaz Bahrami since October 2025.

=== Minister of Agriculture and Food ===
Following the Centre Party's withdrawal from government, he was appointed minister of agriculture and food on 4 February 2025.

==== 2025 ====
Early into his tenure, Sandtrøen was faced with the revelations of many violations of seasonal workers' rights on farms across the country spanning back ten years; which he as a result, called for change in the laws to better protect seasonal workers, further calling it "a paradox that the most vulnerable part of the Norwegian labour force is also the least protected". He and labour minister Tonje Brenna summoned representatives of the sector in for an extraordinary meeting, aiming to reach an agreement on new measures to tackle the issue.

Sandtrøen presented the government's proposal for a law on food waste in April, which would task grocery shops and kiosks to promote products that are about to expire and also reduce the prices of said products. He argued that the law would help the government halv food waste by 2030 if passed. The proposal was put forward to parliament in late May and was passed unanimously.

In mid-May, he presented the government's proposal for the agricultural settlement which was set at a cap of 1.1 billion NOK, which was 300 million more than what the state had originally proposed through negotiations with the farmers' associations. At a press conference, Sandtrøen argued that the negotiated settlement would secure agriculture for the future and strengthen national preparedness and self-suffiency.

Sandtrøen delivered the government's speech on the state of the nation at the opening of the Storting on 11 October. The speech details what the government has done in the last year and is traditionally written and given in Norwegian Nynorsk.

==== 2026 ====
With negotiations for the 2026 agricultural settlement finalised on 16 May, Sandtrøen announced that the agreement reached by the government, Norwegian Agrarian Association and the Norwegian Farmers and Smallholders Union would follow up the objectives set by the Storting for an increase in income by 2027. The government's final offer was an additional 460 billion NOK, which was deemed enough to cover the income differences between farmers and the wage earners.

Sandtrøen was criticised for attending the Skåbuk conference only a day after the death of King Harald V, which was despite that all political parties had agreed to not attend or state anything related to policies until after the funeral. Sandtrøen defended his decision, arguing that the conference was "a professional event" which was important, and that "the [former] King would have agreed".

== Personal life ==
Sandtrøen was born in Tynset Municipality on 2 February 1989. He is a brother of Per Martin Sandtrøen. The brothers were also the first pair of siblings to be elected to parliament since 1903.
