= June Trengereid Gruer =

Norwegian politician (born 2000)

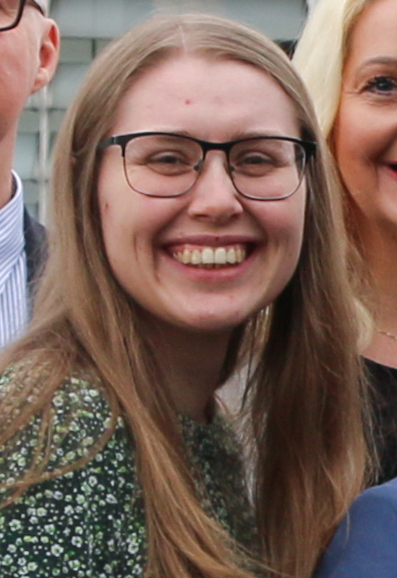

Deputy Member of the Storting
- Incumbent
- Assumed office 1 October 2025
- Deputising for: Lubna Jaffery (2025–)
- Constituency: Hordaland

Personal details
- Born: 7 September 2000 (age 25)
- Party: Labour Party

June Trengereid Gruer (born 7 September 2000) is a Norwegian politician who was elected deputy member of the Storting in 2025. She has served as chairwoman of the Workers' Youth League in Vestland since 2022.

She entered the Storting on 1 October 2025 as a permanent substitute for Minister of Culture and Equality Lubna Jaffery.
