= Sex og Politikk =

Norwegian organization promoting sexual and reproductive health and rights

Sex og Politikk is a non-governmental organisation in Norway that promotes sexual health and rights domestically and internationally. Sex og Politikk is the Norwegian member association of the International Planned Parenthood Federation. It also cooperates with other national and international organisations.

Sex og Politikk offers a sex education/sexuality education class called "Uke Sex" to many schools all across Norway.
