= Even Eriksen =

Norwegian politician (born 1995)

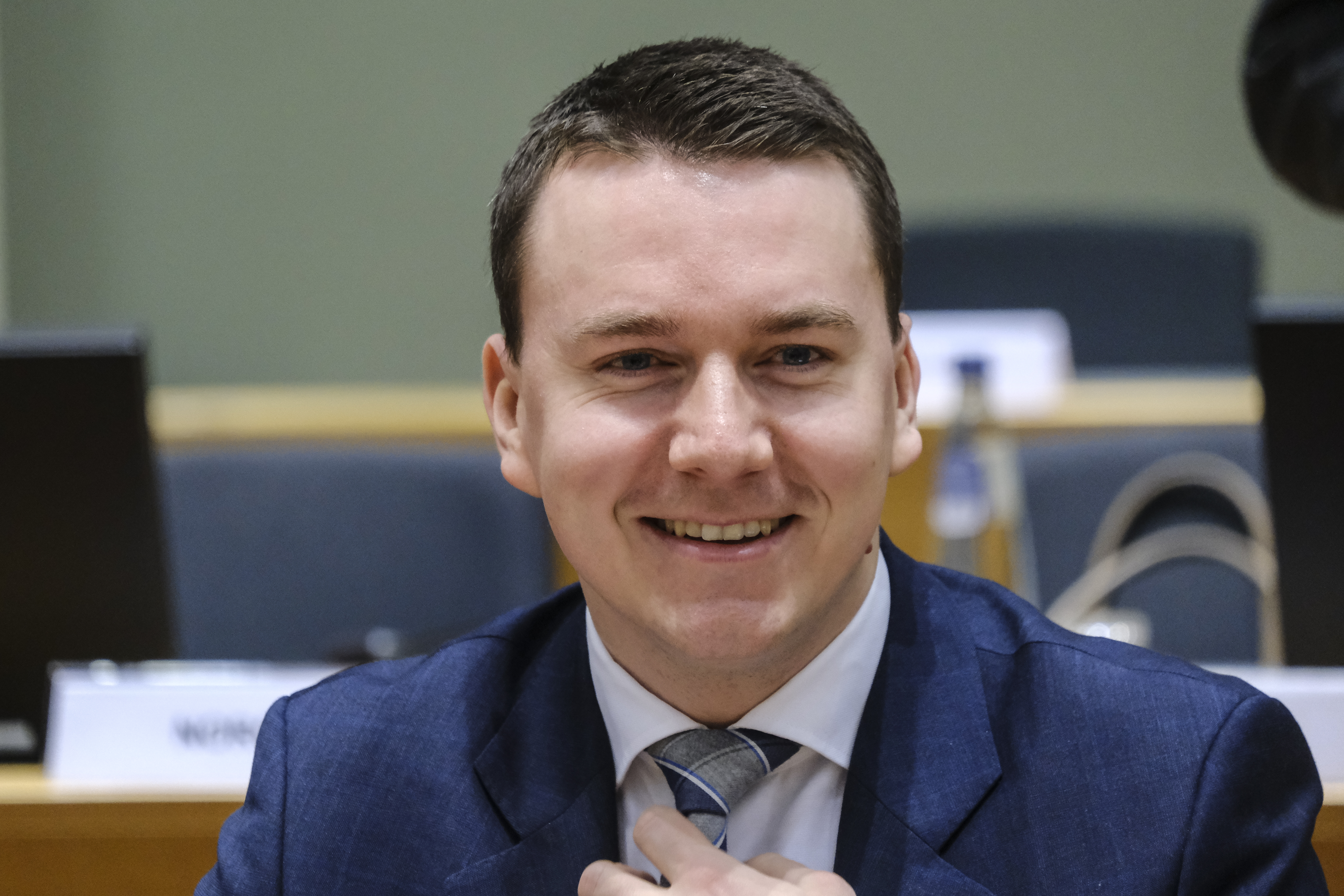
- Eriksen in December 2023
- Born: 7 July 1995 (age 31)
- Education: University of Oslo
- Occupation: Politician
- Political party: Labour

Even Eriksen (born 7 July 1995) is a Norwegian politician for the Labour Party.

== Personal life ==
Eriksen was born on 7 July 1995. He is a son of farmers Svein Otto Eriksen and Gry Vanja Fredhjem.

== Political career ==
Eriksen was elected deputy representative to the Storting from the constituency of Hedmark for the period 2021–2025, for the Labour Party. He deputised for Anette Trettebergstuen in the Storting from 2021 to 2023 while she served as Minister of Culture and Equality in the Støre cabinet. During this time, he was also a member of the Standing Committee on Scrutiny and Constitutional Affairs.

From 14 August 2023 to 25 April 2025, Eriksen was State Secretary in the Ministry of Justice and Public Security.

He deputised in the Storting for Nils Kristen Sandtrøen from 25 April until 30 September 2025. During this time, he was also a member of the Standing Committee on Foreign Affairs and Defence.

Hailing from Trysil, Eriksen has been member of the municipal council of Trysil Municipality since 2015, and of the county council of Innlandet since 2019. He graduated in jurisprudence from the University of Oslo.
