= Father's quota =

Policy for paid parental leave for fathers

The father's quota (Norwegian, fedrekvote; Swedish, pappamånader), also referred to as the "daddy quota", is a policy implemented in Norway, Sweden and Iceland which reserves a part of parental leave periods for fathers (i.e. paternity leave). If the father does not take leave, the family loses the leave period reserved for them; thus the father's quota is not the leave period itself, but rather the principle that a certain part of the leave period can only be taken by the father. The quota, which originally comprised four weeks, was introduced by the Labour government on 1 April 1993. Norway was the first ever country to introduce a father's quota in 1993, followed by Sweden in 1995. Since 2005, the Norwegian quota has been changed several times, and currently is at 15 weeks each for both mothers and fathers. The last change to this policy was put into place by the Conservative Party on 1 July 2014. In Sweden, the quota was increased from 8 to 12 weeks on 1 January 2016. In connection with birth, it is common for the father to get 2 weeks' paid time off, but this is not related to parental leave or the father's quota.

== History ==
=== Adjustments of the Norwegian father's quota over the years ===
- 1993: 4 weeks of father's quota was introduced during Gro Harlem Brundtland's third government.
- 2005: Increase from 4 to 5 weeks during Kjell Magne Bondevik's second government.
- 2006: Increase from 5 to 6 weeks during Jens Stoltenberg's second government.
- 2009: Increase from 6 to 10 weeks during Jens Stoltenberg's second government.
- 2011: Increase from 10 to 12 weeks during Jens Stoltenberg's second government.
- 2013: Increase from 12 to 14 weeks as a result of an increase of parental leave during Jens Stoltenberg's second government.
- 2014: A decrease from 14 to 10 weeks during Erna Solberg's government (from 1 July 2014)
- 2018: Increase from 10 to 15 weeks during Erna Solberg's second government.

=== Political background ===
Starting with Sweden in 1974, and then Norway in 1978, equal rights of access to parental leave for both parents was guaranteed by law, although in practice it was more common for the mother to take advantage of the full parental leave. In 1993, parental leave benefits were expanded with four weeks reserved for the father. The catalyst for this change was a wish for more fathers to take part in the parental leave period. Paternity leave was passed by the Parliament on a proposal from Gro Harlem Brundtlands Labor Party against the Conservative Party and the Progress Party votes. The Conservative Party, in partnership with the Christian Democratic Party and the Liberal Party, was involved in extending the paternity leave from four to five weeks.

Stoltenberg government (majority government consisting of the Labour Party, the Centre Party and the Socialist Left Party) declared in the first Soria Moria declaration in 2005 that they wanted to expand the paternal quota to ten weeks, and in the Soria Moria 2 Declaration in 2009 extended paternal leave to 14 weeks. The expansion occurred in several stages, again against the Conservatives and the Progress Party votes. Furthermore, the parental leave consisted of three parts—following a pattern from Sweden and Iceland. This division meant that 9 weeks were reserved for the mother, 14 weeks were reserved for the father, and the remaining weeks could be freely shared between the parents. Parents can choose to extend their leave to 26–36 weeks, and then receive either 80–100% pay during the benefit period. If the mother or father chooses not to take out their part of the leave, their part cannot be transferred or used by the other part.

An agreement made on 13 September 2013 between the incoming government parties Conservatives, the Progress Party, the Liberal Party and the Christian Democratic Party stated that the paternal quota should be set at 10 weeks, and that it should introduce a trust-based exception scheme makes it possible to transfer all or part of the leave. This was suggested as a compromise of the Christian Democratic Party, after the Conservatives and Progress in the negotiations had wanted a full abolition. Exception criteria will be linked to e.g. disease, unemployed fathers under maternal maternity leave, fathers working abroad, self-employed / sole shareholder and maternal employment. On 1 July 2014 the father's quota was officially reduced from 14 to 10 weeks.

== Controversy ==
The father's quota has been a highly controversial topic in Norway. The largest opposition parties, the Conservative Party and the Progress Party, wish to abolish it completely. They feel that the individual families should be able to decide for themselves how they would like to divide the parental leave period. The purpose of the father's quota is to contribute to a more equal distribution of care taking between mothers and fathers. It is also supposed to change the relationship between mother and father, between employer and employees of both sexes, and between father and child. The policy is focused on placing more value on unpaid work, and emphasizing home production and child care as forms of labor. The basis of this policy is derived from the principle of the welfare state that exists within Norway. It represents the Norwegian society's focus on "egalitarianism as a core value of policy making," by seeking to level the playing field for both men and women. The quota has been criticized by some psychological and medical researchers, who argue that it is based on ideology rather than research and warn that it might have negative effects for children.

According to a 2010 poll for Norway's largest daily Aftenposten, 66% of Norwegians want to abolish the father's quota, while only 28% support it (7% had no opinion). Research by Statistics Norway, however, show that parents with young children were very positive about the father's quota, both in 1993 when it was first introduced, and in 2010 when the quota had grown from 4 to 10 weeks. Only 5% of mothers and 3% of fathers were against the father's quota. The average part of paternity leave used by fathers has increased steadily with the fathers's quota, and in 2010 the average father took more leave than the designated quota weeks.

The argument remains that the effect of the father's quota on gender roles yield economic benefits, and based on Norwegian employment data it is evident that the gap between percentage of adult men to women in the workforce has dropped from 20% in the 1980's to only 5% in 2018. This is significantly representative of a shift in the way Norwegian men and women view division of labor, and the economy thus experiences an increase of gender diversity and individuals who have the freedom to work rather than are being forced to work. Sweden and Iceland have seen a similar return to gender equality in the workforce, with employment rates of educated female professionals increase with 95% of men staying home under the father’s quota. In consideration of Iceland, Sweden, and Norway's narrow population pyramids, the countries have long been searching to increase reproductive rates to help stimulate the economy and population research uncovers evidence that the father's quota made Swedish families more likely to have three kids, as opposed to the average of 1-2.

== Scholarly debate ==
Anne Bærug, head of the National Centre for Breastfeeding at Oslo University Hospital, says that:

"from a professional point of view, the mother should be secured the right to stay at home with the child for at least eight months after birth, in order to fully breastfeed for six months, and gradually introduce other food during the next two months."

Internationally renowned Norwegian obstetrician Gro Nylander considers the increases of the father's quota to be absurd:

"In the midst of self-satisfaction with the father's quota, the reality is that a new father is secured twelve weeks of leave after birth, while the mother is only secured six, according to the law. How on earth did the man become the main person after birth?"

Human biologist and researcher on human behavioral ecology Terje Bongard states that "women are more concerned about their children than men. That's how we are naturally selected. It has taken hundreds of thousands of years to develop our emotional life. There is no way to turn it off with a political decision." According to Bongard, it may have harmful effects for children to take the leave period from mothers and give to fathers.

According to the Norwegian Association for Women's Rights there is limited evidence to support a relationship between the father's quota and gender equality; the few relevant studies point in different directions. For example, a study conducted by several economists (Jon H. Fiva et al.) found that the father's quota has not contributed to promoting gender equality. The study found that the quota led to women working less, that it did not contribute to equal pay, and that it did not appear to alter the distribution of tasks in the home. Psychologist and former Chairman of UNICEF Torild Skard has considered proposals to increase the father's quota to 50% as discriminatory to women and children, while Professor of Child Psychology Turid Suzanne Berg-Nielsen said such proposals have no basis in research on children's development.

Those fathers who stay home to help their spouse with childcare responsibilities further help by giving chore relief to their partner and often allows women to re-enter paid work. Paternal leave gives adequate downtime for both parents to take on such childcare duties. Studies have shown that new fathers who are offered leave were 19% more likely to participate in child related responsibilities such as feeding and getting up to quiet a crying baby. Companies that guarantee paternal leave to new fathers have seen positive benefits in their employees performance and well being with very little to no financial repercussions to business. Impacts for fathers and their families may stem from fear of negative effects on financial earning for taking paternity leave and the associated potential risk of receiving disciplinary actions or demotions.

An indispensable side of this debate are the migrant and refugee populations which have found residency in Scandinavian countries like Sweden and Norway, with risk centering around the potential for refugee migrants to develop psychosis after the trauma experienced in escaping a violent situation. In a study conducted by Stockholm University, the father's quota was found to aid in creating a safe and healthy family environment for migrant populations, which decreases the health inequality between native Swedish and Norwegian citizens and their migrant neighbors. The policy of the father's quota is benefitting the wellness of families on a larger scale than economic, political, or medical experts can quantify independently. To this point, the National Bureau of Economic Research have ongoing research, most recently updated in 2022, that affirms how the father's quota has led to a decrease in maternal health crises and a decrease maternal mental health issues among Swedish women, revealing the deeply essential nature of the father's quota in Norway, Sweden, and Iceland.

== See also ==
- Effects of parental leave policies on gender equality
- Gender equality
- Parental leave
