= Legal Aid for Women =

Legal Aid for Women (Norwegian: Juridisk rådgivning for kvinner; JURK) is a Norwegian non-profit NGO offering legal advice to women on a voluntary and free basis, and a think tank focusing on matters relating to women and the law. It is affiliated with the University of Oslo Faculty of Law. It was founded in 1974. It is a member of the Norwegian Women's Lobby and the Forum for Women and Development. JURK was among the signatories of a 2025 call for an inclusive feminism with around 30 other Norwegian organizations.
