= Anette Trettebergstuen =

Norwegian politician

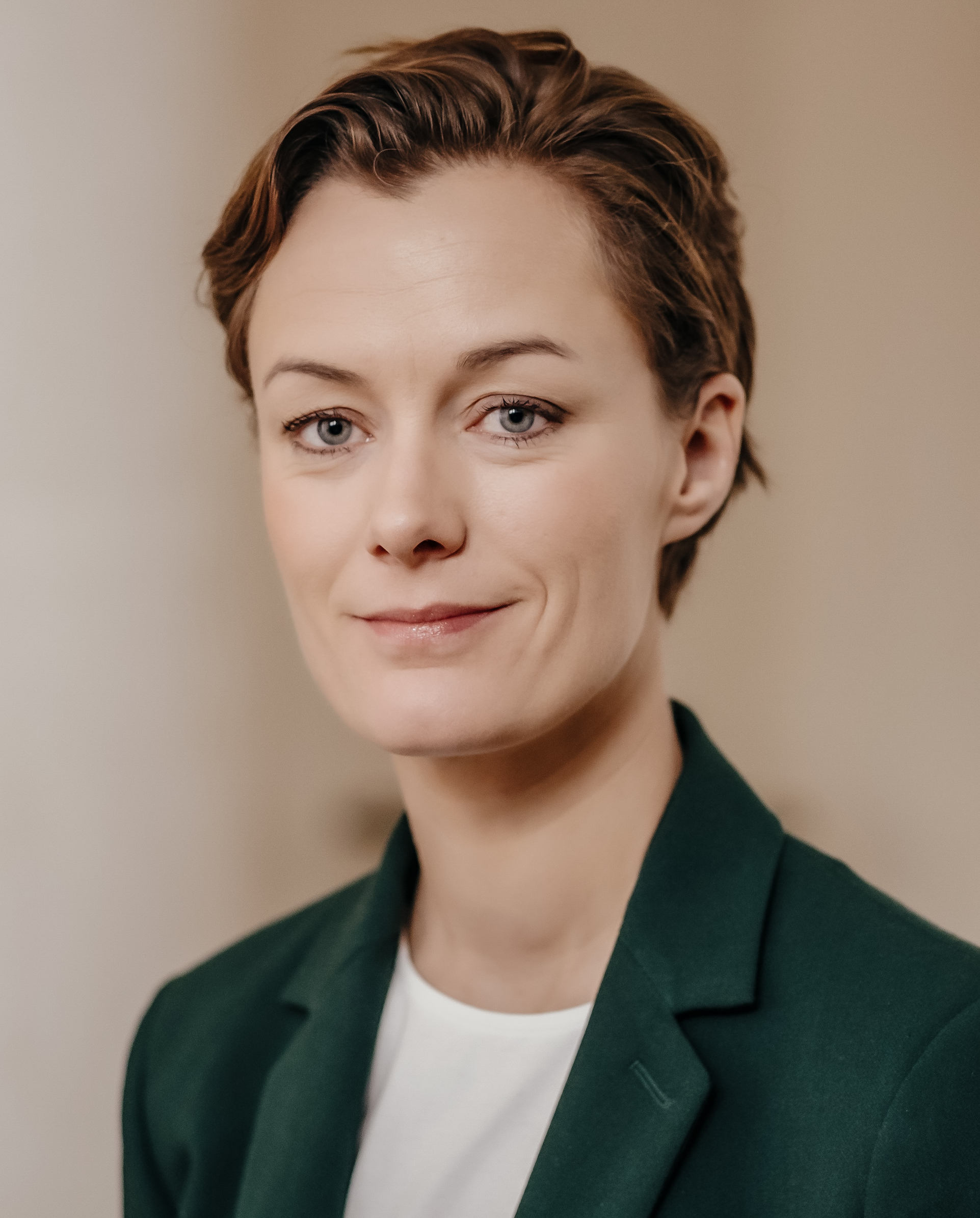
- Trettebergstuen in 2021

Minister of Culture and Equality
- In office 14 October 2021 – 28 June 2023
- Prime Minister: Jonas Gahr Støre
- Preceded by: Abid Raja
- Succeeded by: Lubna Jaffery

Member of the Storting
- In office 1 October 2005 – 30 September 2025
- Deputy: Even Eriksen
- Constituency: Hedmark

Personal details
- Born: 25 May 1981 (age 45) Hamar, Hedmark, Norway
- Party: Labour
- Children: 1

Anette Trettebergstuen (born 25 May 1981) is a Norwegian politician representing the Labour Party, who served as Minister of Culture and Equality in Støre's Cabinet from 2021 to 2023. She was a member of the Norwegian Parliament from Hedmark between 2005 and 2025. She was the only openly lesbian politician in the Norwegian Parliament. In 2020 she was one of the signatories of the "Call for Inclusive Feminism," which led to the establishment of the Initiative for Inclusive Feminism.

== Political career ==
=== Early career ===
Trettebergstuen was born in Hamar. On the local level she was a member of Hamar municipal council from 1999 to 2005. She was the deputy leader of Europeisk Ungdom, the Norwegian youth wing of the European Movement, from 2001 to 2002.

=== Parliament ===
She was elected to the Storting in 2005, representing Hedmark. She has also served as the party's spokesperson for cultural affairs.

In the Storting, Trettebergstuen was a member of the Enlarged Committee on Foreign Affairs and Defence and the Standing Committee on Foreign Affairs and Defence from 2005 to 2009. She has been re-elected since. She was member of the Standing Committee on Labour and Social Affairs from 2009 to 2015, and the Standing Committee on Family and Cultural Affairs from 2015 to 2021. While being part of the Støre's Cabinet between 2021 and 2023, Even Eriksen deputised in her place. She also led the Labour Party's women's network from 2019 to 2025.

Following the 2021 election, she was mentioned as a favorite candidate to become minister of culture and equality.

In February 2024, the National Authority for Investigation and Prosecution of Economic and Environmental Crime in Norway announced that they had launched an investigation into Trettebergstuen's conduct which had led to her resignation as minister of culture and equality. Trettebergstuen herself stated that she would comply with the investigation. In April, they announced that the investigation would be dropped, concluding that she had not committed any punishable offences.

In May 2024, she announced that she wouldn't seek re-election at the 2025 election.

=== Minister of Culture and Equality ===
She was appointed minister of culture and equality on 14 October 2021 in Støre's Cabinet.

In 2020 she was one of the signatories of the "Call for Inclusive Feminism," a document which led to the establishment of the Initiative for Inclusive Feminism. She was a signatory of an additional manifesto against transphobia in 2023.

==== 2021 ====
She attended the Norwegian film premiere for The Worst Person in the World the day after her appointment.

Trettebergstuen attended a congress meeting by the Norwegian Olympic and Paralympic Committee and Confederation of Sports, where she held a speech and made several statements of promises to the sport industry, notably to take action of the backlog of sporting facilities, give full VAT compensation, she would be available to listen and learn among other things. Trettebergstuen also warned that the risk of closure due to COVID-19 was something she hoped would not happen, and added that the danger was over yet.

Trettebergstuen called Dagbladet's revelations of eating disorder struggles within the cross-country skiing sport shocking and unacceptable. She advised that she would be talking to the sports president about the matter, and discuss how the issue could be dealt with and set more focus on it. She notably said: "When body and body weight are seen in the context of performance, there is a fine line between when it comes from being healthy to getting sick."

In early November, while in Copenhagen for the Nordic Council, she called for a united Nordic front against international tech giants, such as Google and Facebook. She notably cited that tech giants removed what they didn't like and doesn't pay taxes, further adding that they also challenged the free press. She also motioned to do like France, who taxes tech giants through OECD. Trettebergstuen also said that Petter Stordalen's proposal of a Nordic tax regime was not the way to go when it came to other solutions.

On 16 November, Trettebergstuen announced that she would look into the possibility of adding a third gender to identification and similar papers in a law proposal. She promised that the work on the proposal would start as quickly as possible, but was uncertain of how long it would take.

On 27 November, Trettebergstuen stated that no representatives of the Norwegian state or government would attend the 2022 FIFA World Cup in Qatar. She also said that she would decline an invitation if she was given one. She noted the recent arrest of two NRK journalists as one of the reasons, and cited that the government would be heavily involved in said case. She also expressed disappointment over FIFA's reaction to the arrest of the two journalists.

On 14 December, Trettebergstuen attended a press conference alongside Trygve Slagsvold Vedum, Jan Christian Vestre and Hadia Tajik to present the government's economic COVID-19 measures. Regarding her field of responsibility, Trettebergstuen said that an extra 1,1 billion NOK would be given to the cultural sector as a part of the government's compensation scheme.

Trettebergstuen expressed her disappointment when it was announced that 12 medieval documents from the era of Norway's union with Denmark would not be handed over to Norway to be put on temporary display at the National Library of Norway. She said: "There are exciting plans the National Library has for the dissemination of medieval history, and it is regrettable if the ambitions have to be reduced because the Danish team does not give access to important historical objects". She went on to say: "We must be able to facilitate communication through the relevant institutions across national borders, regardless of who formally "owns" the various objects".

==== 2022 ====
On 13 January 2022, the government announced a lift of a few COVID-19 measures, which also included a few changes. Trettebergstuen announced that the number of people that can participate at events or gatherings would be put to 200. This included without fixed allotted seats, and at outdoor events in addition to 200 people, with fixed allotted seats, at indoor events. She stated: "In addition, we are now working on solutions to better adapt the number restrictions to the size of the premises. The goal is that we can let in more people at concert arenas, or in sports halls".

Following dissatisfaction from the culture sector about the new restrictions, Trettebergstuen expressed hopes to increase number of event participants. Despite the new restrictions being meant to last four weeks, she expressed hope to change the number of participants before that time is up.

Trettebergstuen was critical to revelations that the Solberg government had agreed and signed a deal on the behalf of the Norwegian sports industry to train Chinese skiers in preparation for the 2022 Olympic Games. She stated: "We would not use the sport in such a thing in a political game. It was at least the case that an agreement was entered into against the will of the sport, then I would say that it is very reminiscent of a political game".

Trettebergstuen was accused to utilise vacated arguments to get rid of X-Games Norway by its leader Henning Andersen. This criticism stemmed from the postponement of the event prior to the COVID-19 pandemic when it had been promised 15 million Norwegian kroner. Andersen went on to accuse the Støre government of downplaying X-Games because it's privately run, in favour of the organised sports. In an email in response to Verdens Gang, Trettebergstuen stated: "I dissociate myself from these accusations. The only reason that X-Games is now not promised support in the future is that they have been recipients of state support for many years, and we want to be able to prioritize others. 15 million NOK is a lot of money, and no one is guaranteed support year after year. On the contrary, of course, I have nothing against the X-Games or this sport".

On 17 March, she congratulated Vibeke Fürst Haugen, who had been nominated as the new Director-General of the Norwegian Broadcasting Corporation, becoming the first woman to hold the position. Her nomination came after the incumbent, Thor Gjermund Eriksen, had announced he would step down over the course of the year.

Marking the 50th anniversary of anti-homosexual legislation was abolished, the government issued an apology to queer people. Trettebergstuen stated: "This apology is important, not only to highlight the injustice that has been committed, but also for all the struggles that still remain. Our goal is to improve the living conditions and mental health of queer people. We will review and strengthen the offer to people with gender incongruence. In addition, we will ban conversion therapy, which undoubtedly has major detrimental effects on those who are exposed to it".

On 24 April, Trettebergstuen announced the establishment of yet another commission for male issues to look into the rising trends of suicide, upper secondary drop outs and lack of appliances for higher education. She stated: "In the public debate, it is often presented as if gender equality policy is women's struggle against men, but in many areas of society, men also have gender equality challenges. This government is concerned with speeding up gender equality policy in general - and is concerned with raising the areas where men have challenges". Said commission was also promised in the Hurdal platform, which stated that the government would look into "men's equality challenges".

Following Ukraine's victory at the Eurovision Song Contest 2022, Trettebergstuen came out in support of President Volodymyr Zelenskyy's suggestion for Mariupol to be the host city for the next contest, to the best possible extent. She was open for NRK to suggest Norway could host the contest. She stated: "Then I think we should deal with it. If it should nevertheless be relevant to hold the final in another country, it is NRK itself that must decide whether they will offer to carry out the event".

On 6 June, Trettebergstuen and education minister Tonje Brenna announced a plan to have more men work within the health sector, in collaboration with the University of Tromsø, to launch a pilot project. The aim for the pilot project is to encourage boys to apply for an education within the health service. Trettebergstuen stated: "We must help open doors for boys and men, so that those who could really imagine a job in healthcare can experience that that option is open".

On 20 June, Trettebergstuen responded to her fellow minister, Kjersti Toppe, regarding her comparison of surrogacy with human trafficking, saying: "It's a comparison I have no sense of. I also do not have the sense that people call these children surrogate children. They're kids, period. No one should look down on the way they have come to be - it is the responsibility of us all". She also criticised Toppe's call for a ban on surrogacy, noting that it wouldn't work in practise together with punishment: "Should parents who bring their baby to the country be imprisoned? It will definitely be against the best interests of the child. And even if fines were imposed, many would think it was worth it".

On 17 August, Trettebergstuen announced a revised version of the book law, which was proposed by then culture minister Hadia Tajik in 2013, but was never passed due to the change of government at the time. The revised proposal includes a set price for new books published in all bookstores. It's also proposed for it to include non-fiction and fiction books. In the draft, it's also suggested that feedback should be given of whether or not the law should include textbooks and subject books. Of the proposal, Trettebergstuen stated: "The Book Act ensures equal treatment for the entire industry. And a greater variety of books. This is ultimately about freedom of expression and democracy". She also stated that the law was to ensure equality in book sales for authors and that they all have the money to write books.

On 26 August, Trettebergstuen presented the new commission for male issues, to be led by Claus Jarvell Moxnes from the United Federation of Trade Unions and has 17 members. The commission is scheduled to present their findings by March 2024. The commission had in its planning stages been criticised for not including female members, which it ultimately did include.

In early October, she praised the making of the film Megatown for its inclusion of an entire cast of functional impaired people.

On 11 November, she condemned activists who attempted to glue themselves to the famous The Scream painting in the National Museum of Art, Architecture and Design the same day.

In December, Trettebergstuen was criticised by the Conservative and Liberal parties to not have taken a stance against FIFA and the IOC, which was a result of the government saying that they would not pursue the previous government's plans of promoting democracy, transparency and more women in central roles in the sports industry. Trettebergstuen dismissed the criticism, notably citing agreement with the opposition on anti-doping policies. Despite this, the Conservatives and Liberals stated that they would call on Trettebergstuen during the Storting question time on 16 December.

==== 2023 ====
In January 2023, she faced criticism from the opposition and the sports sector for having attended less sports related events compared to more cultural events. She also faced criticism for not upholding the pledge for a new Storting message for the sports sector, which had been shelved due to the COVID-19 pandemic by the previous government. The last such message was presented in 2012. Trettebergstuen rejected the criticism, saying that she has daily contact with the sports sector and her ministry informed that she had no plans for sports sector Storting message.

In March, Trettebergstuen announced that the government would be putting forward a equality strategy, which is planned to be finalised by 8 March 2024. According to her, this would be the first time in Norwegian history a Norwegian government has proposed such a strategy. Among the strategy's content, she said it would notably cover male school drop outs, men's mental health, discrimination against women in the workplace, sexual harassment and negative social control.

The Progress Party criticised the government in early May about a proposed ban on foreign gambling sites, which had been put forward by the previous government. Trettebergstuen explained that they were simply following up on the proposal, and that the ban was to strengthen Norsk Tipping and protect vulnerable gambling addicts. The Progress Party called the proposal "censorship" and compared the action with Russia and China.

On 16 June, she together with justice minister Emilie Mehl announced that the government would be moving forward with their proposal of banning conversion therapy. The announcement also came with three suggested amendments to the penal code, which would emphasise on protecting children and making conversion therapy illegal for religious actions and promotion both foreign and domestically illegal.

On 21 June, a day after education minister Tonje Brenna admitted to have mishandled an impartiality issue, Nettavisen revealed that Trettebergstuen had been involved in a similar case when she appointed two colleagues from the Labour Party to the board of Norsk Tipping, one of which was appointed chair of the board. Trettebergstuen confirmed she had evaluated her impartiality when it came to the appointment of one of them, Thomas Breen, but not the other, Sylvia Brustad. She reasoned that her relation to Brustad wasn't strong enough to warrant a impartiality assessment. Two days later, Aftenposten revealed that Trettebergstuen had earlier in June nominated close friend Renate Larsen to the board of the Oslo Opera House. The newspaper also revealed that she had made two other appointments as well without impartiality considerations, one of which is also a godparent to her son. At a press conference the same day, Trettebergstuen announced that she would resign as culture minister. She formally resigned on 28 June and was succeeded by Lubna Jaffery.

== Civic career ==
In November 2025, she joined the communications firm Try Råd as a senior advisor and partner.

== Personal life ==
The Norwegian website Gaysir named her Norway's second most powerful lesbian, in January 2008.

Trettebergstuen has a child together with a friend who is gay.

== Bibliography ==
- Homo – for deg som er, lurer på om du er eller har lyst til å bli homo - eller for deg som bare lurer på hvordan disse homogreiene funker (2017), with Bård Nylund, Pitch forlag

Political offices
Preceded by Abid Raja	Minister of Culture and Equality; 2021–2023	Succeeded by Lubna Jaffery
Party political offices
Preceded by Anniken Huitfeldt	Leader of the Labour Party Women's Network; 2019–2025	Succeeded by Astrid Hoem
