= List of members of the Storting, 1931–1933 =

List of all the members of the Storting in the period 1931 to 1933. The list includes all those initially elected to the Storting as well as deputy representatives where available.

== Rural constituencies ==
=== Østfold county ===
Name	Party	Comments/Deputy
Johannes Olaf Bergersen	Labour Party	
Peder Ludvik Kolstad	Centre Party	
Johan Undrum	Conservative Party	
Peter Olai Thorvik	Labour Party	
Andreas Maastad	Centre Party	
August Thorvald Svendsen	Labour Party	

=== Akershus county ===
Name	Party	Comments/Deputy
Knut Monssen Nordanger	Labour Party	
Finn Blakstad	Conservative Party	
Harald Halvorsen	Labour Party	
Harald Gram	Conservative Party	
Jon Sundby	Centre Party	
Thorleif Høilund	Labour Party	
Alf Staver	Conservative Party	

=== Oslo ===
Name	Party	Comments/Deputy
Carl Joachim Hambro	Conservative Party	
Alfred Martin Madsen	Labour Party	
Johan Henrik Andresen	Conservative Party	
Olaf Johansen	Labour Party	
Arthur Henry Eugen Nordlie	Conservative Party	
Magnus Nilssen	Labour Party	
Julie Augusta Georgine Stang	Conservative Party	

=== Hedmark county ===
Name	Party	Comments/Deputy
Oscar Wilhelm Nilssen	Labour Party	
Arne Adolf Løfsgaard	Centre Party	
Olav Jørgen Sæter	Labour Party	
Knut Torstensen Sjøli	Labour Party	
Peter Thorvald Gaustad	Conservative Party	
Olav Østby-Deglum	Centre Party	
Kristian Lian	Labour Party	Karsten Fonstad stepped in after his death in 1931

=== Oppland county ===
Name	Party	Comments/Deputy
Kristian Ørud	Centre Party	
Johannes Andreassen Bøe	Labour Party	
Hans Olsen Skurdal	Centre Party	
Lars Magnus Moen	Labour Party	
Alf Mjøen	Radical People's Party	
Erik Andreas Knutsen Strand	Centre Party	

=== Buskerud county ===
Name	Party	Comments/Deputy
Christopher Hornsrud	Labour Party	
Jon Reinholdt Aas	Conservative Party	
Nils Andreas Steen	Labour Party	
Harald Saue	Centre Party	
Ivar Engebretsen Tufte	Conservative Party	

=== Vestfold county ===
Name	Party	Comments/Deputy
Nils Jacob Schjerven	Conservative Party	
Svend Foyn Bruun	Conservative Party	
Johan Mathiassen	Labour Party	
Nils Magnus Nilsen Tvedten	Liberal Party	

=== Telemark county ===
Name	Party	Comments/Deputy
Neri Valen	Liberal Party	
Olav Martinius Knutsen Steinnes	Labour Party	
Olav Sannes	Liberal Party	
Olav Aslakson Versto	Labour Party	
Jens Hundseid	Centre Party	

=== Aust-Agder county ===
Name	Party	Comments/Deputy
Torjus Værland	Liberal Party	
Torvald Haavardstad	Labour Party	
Jacob Maurice Ørbæk	Conservative Party	
Halvor Rolvsson Olstad	Centre Party	

=== Vest-Agder county ===
Name	Party	Comments/Deputy
Gunnuf Jakobsen Eiesland	Liberal Party	
Gabriel Endresen Moseid	Centre Party	
Nils Salveson Belland	Liberal Party	
Berner August Berntsen Skeibrok	Conservative Party	

=== Rogaland county ===
Name	Party	Comments/Deputy
Hans Jørgensen Aarstad	Liberal Party	
Nils Martinsen Kverneland	Centre Party	
Karl Korneliussen Kleppe	Liberal Party	
Torkell Vinje	Conservative Party	
Otto Georg Jahn Reimers	Centre Party	

=== Hordaland county ===
Name	Party	Comments/Deputy
Ole Monsen Mjelde	Liberal Party	
Olav Jensen Myklebust	Liberal Party	
Jakob Nilsson Vik	Centre Party	
Wilhelm Mohr	Conservative Party	
Kornelius Olai Bergsvik	Labour Party	
Jon Jørundson Mannsåker	Liberal Party	
Mons Andreas Andersen Kårbø	Liberal Party	
Andreas Johan Rasmusson Garnes	Centre Party	

=== Sogn og Fjordane county ===
Name	Party	Comments/Deputy
Jakob Mathias Antonson Lothe	Liberal Party	
Gjert Andreasson Hegrenæs	Centre Party	
Jens Hermundson Kvale	Liberal Party	
Peder Thorsen Hovland	Centre Party	
Paul Johan Hansen Takle	Conservative Party	

=== Møre county ===
Name	Party	Comments/Deputy
Ole Rasmus Knutsen Flem	Liberal Party	
Rasmus Olsen Langeland	Centre Party	
Olav Eysteinson Fjærli	Liberal Party	
Johan Martin Jakobsen Strand	Liberal Party	
Lars Sverkeson Romundstad	Centre Party	
Olav Berntsen Oksvik	Labour Party	
Ole N. Strømme	Liberal Party	

=== Sør-Trøndelag county ===
Name	Party	Comments/Deputy
Johan Nygaardsvold	Labour Party	
Simon Olsen Leinum	Liberal Party	
Johan Olaus Asmundvaag	Conservative Party	
Martin Halvorsen Handberg	Centre Party	
Johan Falkberget	Labour Party	
Anders Nilsen Næsset	Liberal Party	

=== Nord-Trøndelag county ===
Name	Party	Comments/Deputy
Ivar Larsen Kirkeby-Garstad	Centre Party	
Albert Johnsen Moen	Labour Party	
Anders Arnson Todal	Liberal Party	
Ole Henriksen Langhammer	Centre Party	
Johan Wiik	Labour Party	

=== Nordland county ===
Name	Party	Comments/Deputy
Johan Jæger Caroliussen	Liberal Party	
Eilert Hagerup Prytz Pedersen Præsteng	Conservative Party	
Andreas Johan Hagerup Hansen Moan	Labour Party	
Nils Kristian Nilsen Mjaavatn	Centre Party	
Anton Olai Normann Ingebrigtsen Djupvik	Liberal Party	
Andreas Angel Hansen Holdø	Conservative Party	
Cornelius Lind Enge	Labour Party	
Arnt Gurnerius Holm	Free-minded Liberal Party	

=== Troms county ===
Name	Party	Comments/Deputy
Kristian Pedersen Tønder	Labour Party	
Mikal Schjelderup Pedersen Laberg	Conservative Party	
Lorents Vilhelm Dass Hansen	Liberal Party	
Wilhelm Aldor Ingebrigtsen	Labour Party	
Matias Johan Torheim	Centre Party	

=== Finnmark county ===
Name	Party	Comments/Deputy
Kristian Herman Berg	Labour Party	
Carl Rebek Olsen	Conservative Party	
Johan Martin Mjøen	Liberal Party	

== Urban constituencies ==
=== Halden, Sarpsborg, Fredrikstad, Moss, Drøbak ===
Name	Party	Comments/Deputy
Wilhelm Blakstad	Conservative Party	
Arne Magnussen	Labour Party	
Harald Sigvard Bakke	Conservative Party	
Johan Edvind Pettersen	Labour Party	

=== Hamar, Kongsvinger, Lillehammer, Gjøvik ===
Name	Party	Comments/Deputy
Erling Bühring-Dehli	Conservative Party	
Fredrik Monsen	Labour Party	
Johan Alfred Svendsen	Conservative Party	

=== Hønefoss, Drammen, Kongsberg ===
Name	Party	Comments/Deputy
Sven Adolf Svensen	Conservative Party	
Torgeir Olavson Vraa	Labour Party	Andreas Nygaard
Johan Martinius Antonsen Dokka	Liberal Party	

=== Notodden, Skien, Porsgrunn, Brevik, Kragerø, Risør, Arendal, Grimstad ===
Name	Party	Comments/Deputy
Halvor Løvold	Conservative Party	
Ola Solberg	Labour Party	
Carl Hartmann	Liberal Party	
Erling Amandus Johansen	Conservative Party	
Saamund Olsen Bergland	Labour Party	

=== Holmestrand, Horten, Tønsberg, Sandefjord, Larvik ===
Name	Party	Comments/Deputy
Odd Nerdrum	Conservative Party	
Anton Marius Jenssen	Labour Party	
Christian Blom	Conservative Party	
Trygve Rynning	Conservative Party	

=== Kristiansand, Mandal, Flekkefjord, Stavanger, Haugesund ===
Name	Party	Comments/Deputy
Lauritz Kristian Nilssen Rygh	Liberal Party	
John Norem	Conservative Party	
Børge Olsen-Hagen	Labour Party	
Carl Magne Rønnevig	Liberal Party	
Andreas Kjær	Conservative Party	
Ole Johan Olsen	Labour Party	
Rudolf Peersen	Liberal Party	

=== Bergen ===
Name	Party	Comments/Deputy
Johan Samuelsen	Labour Party	
Johan Ludwig Mowinckel	Liberal Party	
Henrik Ameln	Conservative Party	
Einar Greve	Free-minded Liberal Party	
Gunnar Olai Olsen Bakke	Labour Party	

=== Ålesund, Molde, Kristiansund ===
Name	Party	Comments/Deputy
Anton L. Alvestad	Labour Party	
Torgeir Anderssen-Rysst	Liberal Party	
Endre Magnus Witzøe	Conservative Party	

=== Trondheim, Levanger ===
Name	Party	Comments/Deputy
Ivar Lykke	Conservative Party	
Sverre Støstad	Labour Party	
Olav Bergersen	Conservative Party	
Rudolf Ræder	Free-minded Liberal Party	
Signe Swensson	Conservative Party	

=== Bodø, Narvik, Tromsø, Hammerfest, Vardø, Vadsø ===
Name	Party	Comments/Deputy
Jon Andrå	Labour Party	
Olaf Fjalstad	Conservative Party	
Jens Isak Kobro	Liberal Party	
Julius Bastian Olsen	Labour Party	
