= List of members of the Storting, 1922–1924 =

List of all the members of the Storting in the period 1922 to 1924. The list includes all those initially elected to the Storting as well as deputy representatives where available.

== Rural constituencies ==
=== Østfold county ===
Name	Party	Comments/Deputy
Gunder Anton Jahren	Conservative Party	
Johannes Olaf Bergersen	Social Democratic Labour Party of Norway	
Peder Ludvik Kolstad	Centre Party	
Johan Kristian Hansen Ileby	Conservative Party	
Peter Olai Thorvik	Social Democratic Labour Party of Norway	
Johan Fredrik Olsen Maseng	Liberal Party	

=== Akershus county ===
Name	Party	Comments/Deputy
Anders Venger	Conservative Party	
Peter Andreas Morell	Conservative Party	
Alfred Martin Madsen	Labour Party	
Jon Sundby	Centre Party	
Olaf Bryn	Conservative Party	
Harald Halvorsen	Social Democratic Labour Party of Norway	
Jakob Brevig	Free-minded Liberal Party	

=== Hedmark county ===
Name	Party	Comments/Deputy
Oscar Wilhelm Nilssen	Labour Party	
Wollert Konow (H)	Free-minded Liberal Party	
Olav Jørgen Sæter	Labour Party	
Johan Egeberg Mellbye	Centre Party	
Thorbjørn Gjølstad	Conservative Party	
Knut Torstensen Sjøli	Labour Party	
Johannes Johnsen Grue	Liberal Party	

=== Oppland county ===
Name	Party	Comments/Deputy
Hans Olsen Skurdal	Centre Party	
Alf Mjøen	Radical People's Party	
Einar Gram Borch	Centre Party	
Ole Martin Lappen	Radical People's Party	
Lars Pedersen	Labour Party	
Helge Nilsen Thune	Centre Party	

=== Buskerud county ===
Name	Party	Comments/Deputy
Jon Reinholdt Aas	Conservative Party	
Christopher Hornsrud	Labour Party	
Kristen Christoffersen Kopseng	Conservative Party	
Ansgar Eugéne Olaussen	Labour Party	
Bernt Severinsen	Conservative Party	

=== Vestfold county ===
Name	Party	Comments/Deputy
Ole Olsen Nauen	Conservative Party	
Nils Jacob Schjerven	Conservative Party	
Fredrik Anton Martin Olsen Nalum	Liberal Party	
Haldor Virik	Free-minded Liberal Party	

=== Telemark county ===
Name	Party	Comments/Deputy
Ivar Petterson Tveiten	Liberal Party	
Olav Martinius Knutsen Steinnes	Labour Party	
Herman Løvenskiold	Conservative Party	
Gjermund Nilsen Grivi	Liberal Party	
Tor Ovaldsen Lundtveit	Labour Party	

=== Aust-Agder county ===
Name	Party	Comments/Deputy
Torjus Værland	Liberal Party	
Lars Olsen Skjulestad	Conservative Party	
Nils Nersten	Centre Party	
Aasulv Eivindson Lande	Liberal Party	

=== Vest-Agder county ===
Name	Party	Comments/Deputy
Gunnuf Jakobsen Eiesland	Liberal Party	
Gabriel Endresen Moseid	Centre Party	
Karl Sanne	Conservative Party	
Nils Salveson Belland	Liberal Party	

=== Rogaland county ===
Name	Party	Comments/Deputy
Hans Jørgensen Aarstad	Liberal Party	
Karl Korneliussen Kleppe	Liberal Party	
Otto Georg Jahn Reimers	Centre Party	
Torjus Larsen Gard	Liberal Party	
Jakob Svendsen Gimre	Conservative Party	

=== Hordaland county ===
Name	Party	Comments/Deputy
Ole Monsen Mjelde	Liberal Party	
Wilhelm Mohr	Conservative Party	
Nils Nilsson Skaar	Liberal Party	
Olaf Josefson Bjørgum	Centre Party	
Olav Jensen Myklebust	Liberal Party	
Sverre Krogh	Labour Party	
Lauritz Johan Annaniassen Tvedt	Conservative Party	
Knut Olson Markhus	Liberal Party	

=== Sogn and Fjordane county ===
Name	Party	Comments/Deputy
Elias Faleide	Liberal Party	
Ingolf Elster Christensen	Conservative Party	
Anfin Øen	Centre Party	
Kristofer Pedersen Indrehus	Liberal Party	
Per Klingenberg Hestetun	Liberal Party	

=== Møre county ===
Name	Party	Comments/Deputy
Anders Rasmussen Vassbotn	Liberal Party	
Jakob Larsen Mork	Liberal Party	
Kristoffer Eckhoff Knutsen Høgset	Centre Party	
Olav Eysteinson Fjærli	Liberal Party	
Rasmus Martinus Sivertsen Moltu	Liberal Party	
Rasmus Olsen Langeland	Centre Party	
Ole Rasmus Knutsen Flem	Liberal Party	

=== Sør-Trøndelag county ===
Name	Party	Comments/Deputy
John Iversen Wolden	Liberal Party	
Johan Nygaardsvold	Labour Party	
Ingebrigt Ingebrigtsen Huus	Centre Party	
Johannes Berg	Conservative Party	
Benjamin Olsen Schei	Liberal Party	
Svend Larsen Skaardal	Labour Party	

=== Nord-Trøndelag county ===
Name	Party	Comments/Deputy
Ivar Kirkeby-Garstad	Centre Party	
Johannes Okkenhaug	Liberal Party	
Albert Johnsen Moen	Labour Party	
Johannes Sivertsen Bragstad	Centre Party	
Haakon M. Five	Liberal Party	

=== Nordland county ===
Name	Party	Comments/Deputy
Sven Martin Nøkleby	Free-minded Liberal Party	
Johan Jæger Caroliussen	Liberal Party	
Peter Olsen Bolstad	Labour Party	
Jens Jørgen Jensen Steiro	Centre Party	
Mathias Johan Rasofill Skaar	Conservative Party	
Nils Jørgen August Mikalsen Kulstad	Liberal Party	
Andreas Johan Hagerup Hansen Moan	Labour Party	
Eilert Hagerup Prytz Pedersen Præsteng	Free-minded Liberal Party	

=== Troms county ===
Name	Party	Comments/Deputy
Kristian Pedersen Tønder	Labour Party	
Kristian Fredrik Holst	Free-minded Liberal Party	
Lorents Vilhelm Dass Hansen	Liberal Party	
Wilhelm Aldor Ingebrigtsen	Labour Party	
Meyer Nilsen Foshaug	Social Democratic Labour Party of Norway	

=== Finmark county ===
Name	Party	Comments/Deputy
Hagbarth Lund	Liberal Party	
Waldemar Heggelund Larssen	Free-minded Liberal Party	
Thorolf Bugge	Labour Party	

== Urban constituencies ==
=== Fredrikshald, Sarpsborg, Fredrikstad, Moss, Drøbak ===
Name	Party	Comments/Deputy
Wilhelm Blakstad	Conservative Party	
Arne Magnussen	Social Democratic Labour Party of Norway	
Otto Thott Fritzner Müller	Conservative Party	
Karl Bolivar Olafsen	Social Democratic Labour Party of Norway	

=== Kristiania ===
Name	Party	Comments/Deputy
Otto Bahr Halvorsen	Conservative Party	
Olav Andreas Scheflo	Labour Party	
Carl Joachim Hambro	Conservative Party	
Christian Emil Stoud Platou	Conservative Party	
Kristian Kristensen	Labour Party	
Wilhelm Martin Nygaard	Free-minded Liberal Party	
Karen Platou	Conservative Party	

=== Hamar, Kongsvinger, Lillehammer, Gjøvik (Market towns of Hedmark and Oppland counties) ===
Name	Party	Comments/Deputy
Nils Erik Flakstad	Conservative Party	
Christian Fredrik Monsen	Labour Party	
Simen Fougner	Free-minded Liberal Party	

=== Hønefoss, Drammen, Kongsberg ===
Name	Party	Comments/Deputy
Otto Knoph Rømcke	Conservative Party	
Hans Johansen	Labour Party	
Sven Adolf Svensen	Conservative Party	

=== Holmestrand, Horten, Tønsberg, Sandefjord, Larvik ===
Name	Party	Comments/Deputy
Johan Henrik Christiansen	Conservative Party	
Jørgen Herman Meinich	Conservative Party	
Thomas Arbo Høeg	Conservative Party	
Hans Andreas Hanssen	Labour Party	

=== Notodden, Skien, Porsgrund, Brevik, Kragerø, Risør, Arendal, Grimstad ===
Name	Party	Comments/Deputy
Henrik Roardsen Spangelo	Free-minded Liberal Party	
Eivind Reiersen	Labour Party	
Peter Johan Støren	Conservative Party	
Finn Christian Knudsen	Conservative Party	
Christen Eriksen Berg	Liberal Party	

=== Kristiansand, Mandal, Flekkefjord, Stavanger, Haugesund ===
Name	Party	Comments/Deputy
Cornelius Middelthon	Conservative Party	
Lars Oftedal	Liberal Party	
Adam Hjalmar Egede-Nissen	Labour Party	
Tørris Heggelund	Conservative Party	
Sven Hans Jørgen Svensen	Liberal Party	
Johan David Haslund Gjøstein	Social Democratic Labour Party of Norway	
Hakon Magne Valdemar Wrangell	Free-minded Liberal Party	

=== Bergen ===
Name	Party	Comments/Deputy
Henrik Ameln	Conservative Party	
Ingvald Berentin Aase	Labour Party	
Johan Ernst Mowinckel	Conservative Party	
Johan Ludwig Mowinckel	Liberal Party	
Christian Petersen	Conservative Party	

=== Ålesund, Molde, Kristiansund ===
Name	Party	Comments/Deputy
Anton Ludvik Alvestad	Social Democratic Labour Party of Norway	
Oluf Christian Müller	Free-minded Liberal Party	
Oscar Ludvig Larsen	Conservative Party	

=== Trondhjem, Levanger ===
Name	Party	Kommentarer/Suppleanter
Odd Klingenberg	Conservative Party	
Sverre Støstad	Arbeiderpartiet	
Ivar Lykke	Conservative Party	
Joakim Sveder Bang	Frisinnede Venstre	
Olaf Løhre	Arbeiderpartiet	

=== Bodø, Narvik, Tromsø, Hammerfest, Vardø, Vadsø ===
Name	Party	Comments/Deputy
Johan Henrik Rye Holmboe	Free-minded Liberal Party	
Harald Langhelle	Labour Party	
Arnold Holmboe	Liberal Party	
Karl Marenius Ivarsson	Free-minded Liberal Party	Died in 1923, replaced by deputy Christian Albrecht Jakhelln
