= Market towns of Østfold and Akershus counties =

Former electoral district in Norway

The Market towns of Østfold and Akershus counties (Norwegian: Kjøpstedene i Østfold og Akershus fylker) was an electoral district for parliamentary elections in Norway. It comprised the market towns (Norwegian: kjøpsteder) of Fredrikstad, Halden (until 1928 named Fredrikshald), Moss and Sarpsborg in Østfold county and Drøbak in Akershus county.

The district was established ahead of the 1921 Norwegian parliamentary election following the change from single member constituencies to plural member constituencies in 1919.

Following changes in the national policy on market towns in 1952, these electoral districts were abolished ahead of the 1953 Norwegian parliamentary election. Instead, each county became one electoral district, and for election purposes the towns were integrated into their respective counties.

== Representatives ==
The following representatives were elected from the Market towns of Østfold and Akershus counties:

| | Representative 1 | Representative 2 | Representative 3 | Representative 4 |
|---|---|---|---|---|
| 1921 | Blakstad, H | Magnussen, SDA | Müller, H | Olafsen, SDA |
| 1924 | Blakstad, H | Magnussen, SDA | Bakke, H | Olafsen, SDA |
| 1927 | Enge, A | Blakstad, H | Karlsen, A | Bakke, H |
| 1930 | Blakstad, H | Magnussen, A | Bakke, H | Pettersen, A |
| 1933 | Pettersen, A | Bakke, H | Johannesen, A | Aakre, A |
| 1936 | Pettersen, A | Grønneberg, H | Johannesen, A | Rafn, H |
| 1945 | Hønsvald, A | Jacobsen, A | Fredriksfryd, H | Jenssen, NKP |
| 1949 | Hønsvald, A | Jacobsen, A | Fredriksfryd, H | Gundersen, A |

Legend:

- NKP = Communist Party, Norges Kommunistiske Parti
- A = Labour Party, Det Norske Arbeiderparti
- SDA = Social Democratic Labour Party, Norges Socialdemokratiske Arbeiderparti
- RF = Radical People's Party (Worker Democrats), Det Radikale Folkeparti (Arbeiderdemokratene)
- KrF = Christian Democratic Party, Kristelig Folkeparti
- B = Farmers' Party, Bondepartiet
- V = Liberal Party, Venstre
- FV = Liberal Left Party, Frisinnede Venstre
- H = Conservative Party, Høyre

== Election results ==
=== 1940s ===
==== 1949 ====
Results of the 1949 parliamentary election held on 10 October 1949:

| Party | | Votes | % | List votes (Note: Number used for seat distribution. Roughly correspond to votes × total seats. Actual number may differ slightly due to personal votes.) | Seats |
|---|---|---|---|---|---|
| Labour Party | Ap | 20,043 | 56.38% | 80,162 | 3 |
| Conservative Party | H | 9,051 | 25.46% | 36,199 | 1 |
| Christian Democratic Party | KrF | 2,747 | 7.73% | 10,988 | 0 |
| Communist Party of Norway | K | 2,285 | 6.43% | 9,140 | 0 |
| Liberal Party | V | 1,288 | 3.62% | 5,154 | 0 |
| Society Party | Samfp | 137 | 0.39% | 548 | 0 |
| Valid votes | | 35,551 | 100.00% | 142,191 | 4 |
| Rejected votes | | 183 | 0.45% | | |
| Total polled | | 35,734 | 88.83% | | |
| Registered electors | | 40,226 | | | |

The following candidates were elected: Erling Fredriksfryd (H); Ragnvald Marensius Gundersen (Ap); Nils Hønsvald (Ap); and Henry Jacobsen (Ap).

==== 1945 ====
Results of the 1945 parliamentary election held on 8 October 1945:

| Party | | Votes | % | List votes | Seats |
|---|---|---|---|---|---|
| Labour Party | Ap | 14,602 | 45.36% | 58,365 | 2 |
| Conservative Party | H | 7,147 | 22.20% | 28,584 | 1 |
| Communist Party of Norway | K | 5,087 | 15.80% | 20,350 | 1 |
| Liberal Party | V | 1,237 | 3.84% | 4,947 | 0 |
| Valid votes | | 32,189 | 100.00% | 128,720 | 4 |
| Rejected votes | | 244 | 0.64% | | |
| Total polled | | 32,433 | 85.24% | | |
| Registered electors | | 38,050 | | | |

The following candidates were elected: Erling Fredriksfryd (H); Nils Hønsvald (Ap); Henry Jacobsen (Ap); and Jens Martin Arctander Jenssen (K).

=== 1930s ===
==== 1936 ====
Results of the 1936 parliamentary election held on 19 October 1936:

| Party | | Party | | | | List Alliance | | | |
| Party | | Votes | % | List votes | Seats | Votes | % | List votes | Seats |
|---|---|---|---|---|---|---|---|---|---|
| Labour Party | Ap | 15,011 | 55.75% | 60,041 | 3 | 15,011 | 55.77% | 60,041 | 2 |
| Conservative Party | H | 8,482 | 31.50% | 33,922 | 1 | 11,337 | 42.12% | 45,341 | 2 |
| Liberal Party | V | 2,865 | 10.64% | 11,459 | 0 | 11,337 | 42.12% | 45,341 | 2 |
| Nasjonal Samling | NS | 370 | 1.37% | 1,479 | 0 | 370 | 1.37% | 1,479 | 0 |
| Society Party | Samfp | 197 | 0.73% | 788 | 0 | 197 | 0.73% | 788 | 0 |
| Valid votes | | 26,925 | 100.00% | 107,689 | 4 | 26,915 | 100.00% | 107,649 | 4 |
| Rejected votes | | 822 | 2.73% | | | | | | |
| Total polled | | 27,103 | 89.88% | | | | | | |
| Registered electors | | 30,155 | | | | | | | |

As the list alliance was entitled to more seats contesting as an alliance than it was contesting as individual parties, the distribution of seats was as list alliance votes. The H-V list alliance's additional seat was allocated to the Conservative Party.

The following candidates were elected: Alfred Mathias Grønneberg (H); Johan Ludvig Johannesen (Ap); Johan Edvind Pettersen (Ap); and Robert Rafn (H).

==== 1933 ====
Results of the 1933 parliamentary election held on 16 October 1933:

| Party | | Votes | % | List votes | Seats |
|---|---|---|---|---|---|
| Labour Party | Ap | 13,374 | 54.79% | 53,496 | 3 |
| Conservative Party | H | 7,660 | 31.38% | 30,632 | 1 |
| Free-minded People's Party | FF | 7,660 | 31.38% | 30,632 | 1 |
| Liberal Party | V | 2,569 | 10.52% | 10,274 | 0 |
| Nasjonal Samling | NS | 589 | 2.41% | 2,357 | 0 |
| Communist Party of Norway | K | 218 | 0.89% | 872 | 0 |
| Valid votes | | 24,410 | 100.00% | 97,631 | 4 |
| Rejected votes | | 118 | 0.41% | | |
| Total polled | | 24,528 | 85.51% | | |
| Registered electors | | 28,686 | | | |

The following candidates were elected: Abraham Aakre (Ap); Harald Sigvard Bakke (H-FF); Johan Ludvig Johannesen (Ap); and Johan Edvind Pettersen (Ap).

==== 1930 ====
Results of the 1930 parliamentary election held on 20 October 1930:

| Party | | Votes | % | List votes | Seats |
|---|---|---|---|---|---|
| Conservative Party | H | 10,612 | 47.15% | 42,447 | 2 |
| Free-minded Liberal Party | FV | 10,612 | 47.15% | 42,447 | 2 |
| Labour Party | Ap | 9,560 | 42.48% | 38,215 | 2 |
| Liberal Party | V | 2,201 | 9.78% | 8,805 | 0 |
| Communist Party of Norway | K | 133 | 0.59% | 536 | 0 |
| Valid votes | | 22,506 | 100.00% | 90,003 | 4 |
| Rejected votes | | 135 | 0.50% | | |
| Total polled | | 22,641 | 83.41% | | |
| Registered electors | | 27,145 | | | |

As the list alliance was not entitled to more seats contesting as an alliance than it was contesting as individual parties, the distribution of seats was as party votes.

The following candidates were elected: Harald Sigvard Bakke (H-FV); Wilhelm Blakstad (H-FV); Arne Magnussen (Ap); and Johan Edvind Pettersen (Ap).

=== 1920s ===
==== 1927 ====
Results of the 1927 parliamentary election held on 17 October 1927:

| Party | | Votes | % | List votes | Seats |
|---|---|---|---|---|---|
| Labour Party | Ap | 11,215 | 52.91% | 44,858 | 2 |
| Conservative Party | H | 8,477 | 39.99% | 33,899 | 2 |
| Free-minded Liberal Party | FV | 8,477 | 39.99% | 33,899 | 2 |
| Liberal Party | V | 1,292 | 6.09% | 5,169 | 0 |
| Communist Party of Norway | K | 214 | 1.01% | 856 | 0 |
| Valid votes | | 21,198 | 100.00% | 84,782 | 4 |
| Rejected votes | | 149 | 0.58% | | |
| Total polled | | 21,347 | 83.27% | | |
| Registered electors | | 25,635 | | | |

The following candidates were elected: Harald Sigvard Bakke (H-FV); Wilhelm Blakstad (H-FV); Ludvig Elmar Hegge Olsen Enge (Ap); and Haakon Oliver Karlsen (Ap).

==== 1924 ====
Results of the 1924 parliamentary election held on 21 October 1924:

| Party | | Votes | % | List votes | Seats |
|---|---|---|---|---|---|
| Conservative Party | H | 8,852 | 44.13% | 35,405 | 2 |
| Free-minded Liberal Party | FV | 8,852 | 44.13% | 35,405 | 2 |
| Social Democratic Labour Party of Norway | S | 7,217 | 35.98% | 28,857 | 2 |
| Liberal Party | V | 1,889 | 9.42% | 7,559 | 0 |
| Labour Party | Ap | 1,788 | 8.91% | 7,152 | 0 |
| Communist Party of Norway | K | 313 | 6.24% | 1,252 | 0 |
| Valid votes | | 20,059 | 100.00% | 80,225 | 4 |
| Rejected votes | | 209 | 0.86% | | |
| Total polled | | 20,268 | 83.10% | | |
| Registered electors | | 24,389 | | | |

The following candidates were elected: Harald Sigvard Bakke (H-FV); Wilhelm Blakstad (H-FV); Arne Magnussen (S); and Karl Bolivar Olafsen (S).

==== 1921 ====
Results of the 1921 parliamentary election held on 24 October 1921:

| Party | | Votes | % | List votes | Seats |
|---|---|---|---|---|---|
| Conservative Party | H | 8,861 | 45.11% | 35,441 | 2 |
| Free-minded Liberal Party | FV | 8,861 | 45.11% | 35,441 | 2 |
| Social Democratic Labour Party of Norway | S | 6,729 | 34.25% | 26,918 | 2 |
| Labour Party | Ap | 2,366 | 12.04% | 9,452 | 0 |
| Liberal Party | V | 1,683 | 8.57% | 6,726 | 0 |
| Wild Votes | | 5 | 0.03% | | 0 |
| Valid votes | | 19,644 | 100.00% | | 4 |
| Rejected votes | | 166 | 0.70% | | |
| Total polled | | 19,810 | 83.69% | | |
| Registered electors | | 23,670 | | | |

The following candidates were elected: Wilhelm Blakstad (H-FV); Arne Magnussen (S); Otto Thott Fritzner Müller (H-FV); and Karl Bolivar Olafsen (S).

== Sources ==
- Parliamentary representatives - Norwegian Parliament official site
