= Market towns of Vest-Agder and Rogaland counties =

Former electoral district in Norway

The Market towns of Vest-Agder and Rogaland counties (Norwegian: Kjøpstedene i Vest-Agder og Rogaland fylker) was an electoral district for parliamentary elections in Norway. It comprised the market towns (Norwegian: kjøpsteder) of Flekkefjord, Kristiansand and Mandal in Vest-Agder county and Haugesund and Stavanger in Rogaland county.

The district was established ahead of the 1921 Norwegian parliamentary election following the change from single member constituencies to plural member constituencies in 1919.

Following changes in the national policy on market towns in 1952, these electoral districts were abolished ahead of the 1953 Norwegian parliamentary election. Instead, each county became one electoral district, and for election purposes the towns were integrated into their respective counties.

== Representatives ==
The following representatives were elected from the Market towns of Vest-Agder and Rogaland counties:

	Representative 1	Representative 2	Representative 3	Representative 4	Representative 5	Representative 6	Representative 7
1921	Middelthon, H	L. Oftedal, V	Egede-Nissen, A	Heggelund, H	Svensen, V	Gjøstein, SDA	Wrangell, FV
1924	Norem, H	L. Oftedal, V	Olsen-Hagen, A	Heggelund, H	Meling, V	Løge, SDA	Wrangell, FV
1927	Olsen-Hagen, A	Norem, H	Tveteraas, V	O.J. Olsen, A	Heggelund, H	Jørgensen, V	Førre, A
1930	Rygh, V	Norem, H	Olsen-Hagen, A	Rønnevig, V	Kjær, H	O.J. Olsen, A	Peersen, V
1933	Olsen-Hagen, A	Rygh, V	Nielsen, H	O.J. Olsen, A	Peersen, V	Førre, A	Jacobsen, H
1936	Natvig-Pedersen, A	Rygh, V	Nielsen, H	O.J. Olsen, A	Meling, V	Kjær, H	Førre, A
1945	Natvig-Pedersen, A	C. Oftedal, V	Friis, A	Nielsen, H	Westerlund, A	O. Olsen, V	S. Oftedal, A
1949	Natvig-Pedersen, A	Ingebretsen, V	Friis, A	Nielsen, H	Nilsen, A	Osland, V	Hegna, A

Legend:

- NKP = Communist Party, Norges Kommunistiske Parti
- A = Labour Party, Det Norske Arbeiderparti
- SDA = Social Democratic Labour Party, Norges Socialdemokratiske Arbeiderparti
- RF = Radical People's Party (Worker Democrats), Det Radikale Folkeparti (Arbeiderdemokratene)
- KrF = Christian Democratic Party, Kristelig Folkeparti
- B = Farmers' Party, Bondepartiet
- V = Liberal Party, Venstre
- FV = Liberal Left Party, Frisinnede Venstre
- H = Conservative Party, Høyre
