= Jørgen Olsen Thon =

Norwegian politician (1866–1937)

Jørgen Olsen Thon (8 March 1866 – 12 January 1937) was a Norwegian newspaper editor and politician for the Labour and Social Democratic Labour parties.

He started his career as a construction, mine and factory laborer, and was organized in 1903. He was hired as a journalist in Hønefos og Oplands Socialdemokrat in 1914, and was then its chief editor from 1915 to 1927. He then took over as head of the local office of Fremtiden.

He chaired the Labour Party locally, and served in Hønefoss city council. He was fielded as Labour's parliamentary candidate already in the 1906 election, in the single-member constituency Kongsberg, Hønefoss og Notodden, but ended last. In the 1909 election he was fielded as the running mate of J. O. Jarnæs, but again without success. He later joined the Social Democratic Labour Party, and was their sixth ballot candidate in the 1924 election. In 1927 and 1930 he again stood for election for the Labour Party, and was elected as a deputy representative to the Parliament of Norway.

He was the father of Knut Thon, born 1889, who was mayor of Hønefoss.
