= Market towns of Sør-Trøndelag and Nord-Trøndelag counties =

Former electoral district in Norway

The Market towns of Sør-Trøndelag and Nord-Trøndelag counties (Norwegian: Kjøpstedene i Sør-Trøndelag og Nord-Trøndelag fylker) was an electoral district for parliamentary elections in Norway. It comprised the market towns (Norwegian: kjøpstad) of Trondheim in Sør-Trøndelag county and Levanger in Nord-Trøndelag county.

The district was established ahead of the 1921 Norwegian parliamentary election following the change from single member constituencies to plural member constituencies in 1919.

Following changes in the national policy on market towns in 1952, these electoral districts were abolished ahead of the 1953 Norwegian parliamentary election. Instead, each county became one electoral district, and for election purposes the towns were integrated into their respective counties.

== Representatives ==
The following representatives were elected from the Market towns of Sør-Trøndelag and Nord-Trøndelag counties:

	Representative 1	Representative 2	Representative 3	Representative 4	Representative 5
1921	Klingenberg, H	Støstad, A	Lykke, H	Bang, FV	Løhre, A
1924	Lykke, H	Darre-Jenssen, H	Støstad, A	Aarseth, A	Bang, FV
1927	Lykke, H	Støstad, A	Darre-Jenssen, H	Aarseth, A	Løhre, NKP
1930	Lykke, H	Støstad, A	Bergersen, H	Ræder, FV	Swensson, H
1933	Lykke, H	Støstad, A	Swensson, H	Aarseth, A	Ræder, FV
1936	Støstad, A	Lykke, H	Aarseth, A	Øraker, A	Torp, H
1945	Støstad, A	Lyng, H	Vogt, NKP	Johnsen, A	Øraker, A
1949	Johnsen, A	Lyng, H	Lange, A	Lyseth, A	Kobbe, H

Legend:

- NKP = Communist Party, Norges Kommunistiske Parti
- A = Labour Party, Det Norske Arbeiderparti
- SDA = Social Democratic Labour Party, Norges Socialdemokratiske Arbeiderparti
- RF = Radical People's Party (Worker Democrats), Det Radikale Folkeparti (Arbeiderdemokratene)
- KrF = Christian Democratic Party, Kristelig Folkeparti
- B = Farmers' Party, Bondepartiet
- V = Liberal Party, Venstre
- FV = Liberal Left Party, Frisinnede Venstre
- H = Conservative Party, Høyre
