= Aakre (surname) =

Aakre is a surname. Notable people with the surname include:

- Abraham Aakre (1874–1948), Norwegian politician
- Bodil Aakre (1922–2008), Norwegian politician
