= Hønefoss og Oplands Socialdemokrat =

Norwegian newspaper published in Hønefoss

Hønefoss og Oplands Socialdemokrat was a Norwegian newspaper, published in Hønefoss.

The newspaper was started in 1913 as the Norwegian Labour Party's organ in Ringerike. Its first editor was Ingvald Førre, followed by N. Lieng in 1914 and Jørgen Thon in 1915. It was issued thrice a week.

In 1921, when the Social Democratic Labour Party of Norway broke away from the Labour Party, a vote was held to decide whether Hønefoss og Oplands Socialdemokrat should align with the new party. Two third of the voters decided to do so, with the majority supporting the Twenty-one Conditions. At the annual meeting in May 1922, the decision was reinforced, with the newspaper officially aligning with the Social Democratic Labour Party. Carl Severin Bentzen was elected as chairman of the board.

In 1927, when the Social Democratic Labour Party reunited with Labour, Hønefoss og Oplands Socialdemokrat was bought by Torgeir Vraa's Fremtiden, usurping the position as Labour Party newspaper in Ringerike.
