= Oscar Olson =

Oscar Olson may refer to:

- Oscar Olson (tug of war) (1878–1963), American tug of war athlete
- Oscar L. Olson (1872–1956), president of Luther College
- Oscar R. Olson (1869–1945), member of the Wisconsin State Senate
- Oscar Olson (basketball) (1917–1997), American basketball player

== See also ==
- Oscar Olsson (1877–1950), regarded as the father of study circles
- Oscar Olsen (1908–2004), Norwegian politician
- Oscar Reynert Olsen (1925–2026), Norwegian artist
