= Nils Jønsberg =

Norwegian politician

Nils Jønsberg (12 August 1808 – 28 April 1885) was a Norwegian priest and politician.

== Biography ==
Nils Simensen Jønsberg was born on the Jønsberg farm in Romedal parish in Hedmark county, Norway. He was the son of parish priest (sogneprest) Simen Christoffersen Jønsberg and Karen Dorthea Thesen Arneberg. He graduated at the Cathedral School in Christiania, (now Oslo) in 1827. He earned his theological degree in 1831. He started his career as a chaplain at the church in Drøbak in Frogn Municipality in Akershus county. He graduated as cand.theol. in 1831. In 1835 he was appointed as parish priest at Karlsøy Church in Troms county, where he also served as the first mayor (1838-1841) of Karlsøy Municipality.

He was an elected to the Norwegian Parliament in 1842, representing the constituency of Finmarkens Amt, which at that time consisted of both Finnmark and Troms. He sat through only one term. Later he was parish priest in Skjerstad Municipality in Nordland county (1843-1855), where he also was elected the mayor of (1844-1848) and (1852-1856). He was appointed vicar in Skogn Municipality in Nord-Trøndelag county (1855-1868) and in Arendal Municipality in Aust-Agder county (1868-1881).

His grandson Nils Erik Flakstad served as a member of Parliament representing the market towns of Hedmark and Oppland counties.
