= Heggelund =

Heggelund is a surname. Notable people with the surname include:

- Kjell Heggelund (1932–2017), Norwegian literary researcher, lecturer, editor, manager, poet, translator and literary critic
- Martin Heggelund (born 1983), Danish para-cyclist
- Stefan Heggelund (born 1984), Norwegian communication consultant and politician
- Tørris Heggelund (1872–1940), Norwegian jurist and politician
