= Ragnhild Hartmann Varmbo =

Norwegian politician

Ragnhild Hartmann Varmbo (24 June 1886 - 4 January 1982) was a Norwegian politician for the Conservative Party.

She served as a deputy representative to the Norwegian Parliament from the Market towns of Sør-Trøndelag and Nord-Trøndelag counties during the terms 1937–1945 and 1945–1949, and met in parliament for 85 days in total. She was president of the Trondheim Association for Women's Rights, the regional chapter for Central Norway of the Norwegian Association for Women's Rights, from 1950 to 1954.

She worked as a school teacher. She was a cousin of Olaf Amundsen.
