= Ingvald Førre =

Norwegian politician

Ingvald Severin Johannessen Førre (24 December 1879 – 1962) was a Norwegian newspaper editor, civil servant and politician for the Labour Party, who left the party in 1938.

== Early life ==
He was born in Haugesund as a son of seaman Nils Johannessen Førre (1834–1920) and Martha Jensine Baardsen (1842–1918). He took typographer's training in his home city as well as Kristiania, and from 1906 to 1912 he edited his hometown Labour newspaper Haugesunds Arbeiderblad. He then applied for jobs in other newspapers, such as the editorship in Demokraten in June 1913. He did not prevail there, but was editor of Hønefos og Oplands Socialdemokrat from 1913 to 1914. In 1914 he returned to Haugesund where he started a printing venture.

== Career ==
He was employed as director of housing in Haugesund municipality from 1919 to 1923, then as a director in the city's tax authority. From 1924 to August 1946 he served as the city's deputy magistrate (Norwegian: underfoged). He also managed the Bank of Norway department in Haugesund between 1930 and 1941.

He was a member of Haugesund city council from 1910 to 1913. After a hiatus he was elected again in 1919, and served one term. He later served from 1925 to the Second World War. He served as deputy mayor in 1927 and 1936, and mayor in 1938. He served three terms in the Parliament of Norway, being elected in 1927, 1933 and 1936 from the constituency Market towns of Vest-Agder and Rogaland counties. In between he served in the term 1931–1933 as a deputy representative. In the late 1930s he became outspokenly disoriented with his Labour Party, who had scrapped its traces of pacifist defence policy, and ventured into armament. He resigned from the party in 1938, and justified his views in a book called Åndskampens vei til det klasseløse fredssamfund.

=== Post-WWII ===
After the Second World War, the Public Prosecutor in Rogaland suggested that Førre be tried for treason, following an alleged display of leniency towards the Nazi occupying authority in 1940. The Office of the Director of Public Prosecutions decided not to try him, but admonished him verbally of having shown an "unsatisfactory national attitude". In 1949, Førre headed the parliamentary election ballot of the Society Party. He died in 1962.
