= Anders Hove =

Anders Hove may refer to:

- Anders Hove (politician) (1885–1978), Norwegian politician
- Anders Hove (actor) (born 1956), actor and director from Greenland
