= Johan O. Jarnæs =

Norwegian politician

Johan Olaussen Jarnæs

Personal details
- Born: 3 August 1867 Kongsberg, Norway
- Died: 1 October 1928 (aged 61) Kongsberg, Norway

Johan Olaussen Jarnæs (3 August 1867 – 1 October 1928) was a Norwegian politician for the Labour and Social Democratic Labour parties.

He was born in Kongsberg. He was hired as a labourer at Kongsberg Dampsag, but after one year he was hired at Kongsberg Silver Mines. He was a miner here from 1883 to 1913, then a supervisor in the district's log driving. From 1903 to 1913 he chaired the local silver miners' trade union.

He was elected to Kongsberg city council in 1901 and continuously re-elected. From 1907 he was a member of the executive committee, serving as deputy mayor in 1908, 1911 and 1912. He then served as mayor of Kongsberg from July to December 1913, and later from 1917 through 1922. In his time he was the first social democratic mayor of the city, and also the longest-serving mayor.

He was fielded as Labour's parliamentary candidate already in the 1909 election, in the single-member constituency Kongsberg og Hønefoss. His running mate was J. O. Thon. With 602 votes he ended behind the Conservative candidate (631 votes) and the victor, Liberal Adolf T. H. Strengehagen (813 votes), who had held the seat since 1898. The two next elections were carried by Nils Gulliksen Berg of the same party.

In the 1912 election Jarnæs had won the first round with 691 votes, now with C. S. Bentzen as running mate. To their advantage the Liberal vote was split between Strengehagen and B. Cranner, but in the second round Strengehagen as well as the Conservative candidate pulled out to back Berg. Berg won with 1 080 votes against Jarnæs' 892 and Cranner's 696. In the 1915 election Jarnæs fielded as the running mate of Bentzen. They won the first round, but in the second round all non-socialist parties rallied behind Berg who won the seat for the second and last time.

He later joined the Social Democratic Labour Party, and was their third ballot candidate in the 1921 election (the ballot was headed by Bentzen) and the fifth ballot candidate in the 1924 election.

Jarnæs was also a member of the school board from 1905 to 1907, board of the power plant, retirement home and provisioning council during the First World War.
