= Knut Jacobsen =

Knut Jacobsen may refer to:

- Knut Jacobsen (politician) (1885–1976), Norwegian banker and politician
- Knut A. Jacobsen, Norwegian scholar of the history of religions
- Knut Jacobsen (actor) (1910–1971), Norwegian actor and costume designer
