= Rudolf Elias Peersen =

Norwegian lawyer and politician

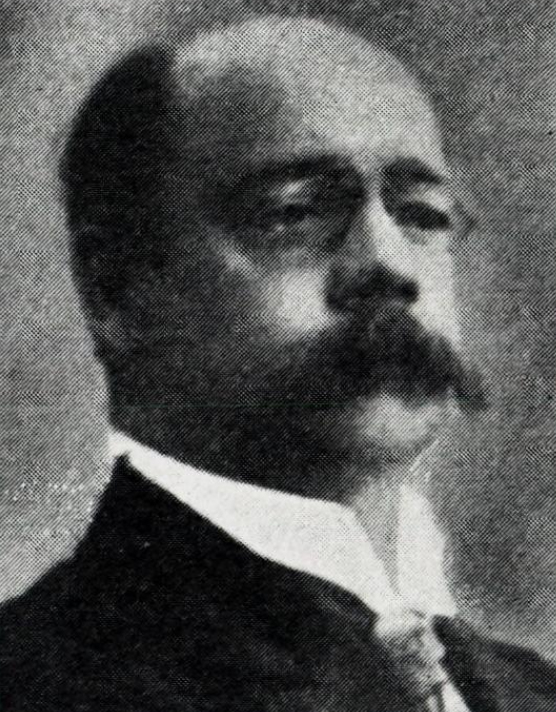

Mayor of Kristiansand
- In office 8 May 1945 – 31 December 1945
- Preceded by: O. A. Fosby
- Succeeded by: Karl Rosenløv
- In office 1 January 1937 – 31 December 1940
- Preceded by: Einar Jørgensen
- Succeeded by: Anders Kjær

Member of the Norwegian Parliament
- In office 1 January 1931 – 31 December 1936
- Constituency: Market towns of Vest-Agder and Rogaland counties
- In office 1 January 1913 – 31 December 1918
- Constituency: Baneheia

President of the Odelsting
- In office 1917 – 31 December 1918
- Succeeded by: Ole M. Mjelde

Minister of Defence
- In office 20 February 1919 – 17 June 1919
- Prime Minister: Gunnar Knudsen
- Preceded by: Christian T. Holtfodt
- Succeeded by: Ivar Aavatsmark

Personal details
- Born: Rudolf Elias Peersen; 28 April 1868 Kristiansand, Vest-Agder, Sweden-Norway
- Died: 5 February 1949 (aged 80) Kristiansand, Vest-Agder, Norway
- Party: Liberal
- Spouse: Charlotte Margrethe Andersen (m. 1895)

Rudolf Elias Peersen (28 April 1868 – 5 February 1949) was a Norwegian lawyer and politician.

Peersen was born in Kristiansand on 28 April 1868, the son of Jens P. Peersen and Tomine Margrethe Ommundsen. He studied law at the University of Kristiania from 1888 to 1892. He became active in politics on the left, both locally and nationally. He was a member of Kristiansand city council at various times from 1905 to 1945, including being mayor from 1938 to 1940 and again in 1945. He represented Kristiansand in the national parliament from 1913 to 1919, briefly serving as Minister of Defence for a few months in 1919. He served as a member of the parliament again from 1930 to 1936. He was a member of the Norwegian Association for Women's Rights.
