= Leif Bjorholt Burull =

Norwegian politician (1895–1971)

Leif Bjorholt Burull (29 November 1895 – 18 November 1971) was a Norwegian lawyer and politician for the Conservative Party.

== Biography ==
Burull was born at the village of Langesund in Telemark. He studied law at the University of Oslo, completed his master's degree in law and graduated as cand.jur. in 1920. From 1921 to 1923 he was an assistant judge in Sør-Hedmark, then an assistant to a lawyer in Hamar until 1927. He operated his own lawyer firm in Hamar until 1971.

At the local level he was a member of Hamar city council during the terms 1934–1937, 1937–1945 and 1945–1947. He chaired the local party chapter from 1938 to 1946. He was elected to the Norwegian Parliament from the Market towns of Hedmark and Oppland counties in 1945, but was not re-elected in 1949.

He was chairman of the board of 5the daily newspaper Hamar Stiftstidende from 1950 to 1969, and board member of the local savings bank Hamar Sparebank from 1955 to 1971. He was also active in the Riksmål Society (Riksmålsforbundet) and Rotary International, and wrote three genealogy books. He chaired the tennis group in Hamar IL in 1928.
