= Henrik Nielsen (gymnast) =

Norwegian artistic gymnast

- Full name: Henrik Meyer Nielsen
- Born: 3 November 1896 Bergen, United Kingdoms of Sweden and Norway
- Died: 8 August 1973 (aged 76) Bergen, Norway

Gymnastics career
- Discipline: Men's artistic gymnastics
- Country represented: Norway
- Club: Norrøna
Medal record
Men's artistic gymnastics
Representing Norway
Olympic Games
Silver medal – second place	1920 Antwerp	Team, free system

Henrik Meyer Nielsen (3 November 1886 – 8 August 1973) was a Norwegian gymnast who competed in the 1920 Summer Olympics. He was part of the Norwegian team, which won the silver medal in the gymnastics men's team, free system event.
