= Ragnvald Marensius Gundersen =

Norwegian politician

Ragnvald Marensius Gundersen (10 August 1907 – 12 March 1985) was a Norwegian politician for the Labour Party.

He was born in Glemminge.

He was elected to the Norwegian Parliament from the "Market towns of Østfold and Akershus counties" in 1950, but was not re-elected in 1954. He had previously served in the position of deputy representative during the term 1945–1949, during parts of which he served as a regular representative, while Nils Hønsvald was appointed to the Cabinet.

Gundersen was a member of Fredrikstad city council in 1931–1934 and 1937–1940, and later served as mayor from 1945 to 1965 and deputy mayor from 1966 to 1971. He was also a deputy county mayor of Østfold county in 1963–1967, and county mayor in 1967–1971. He then sat one final term as a member of both Fredrikstad city council and Østfold county council from 1971–1975.
