= Jens Martin Arctander Jenssen =

Norwegian politician (1885–1968)

Jens Martin Arctander Jenssen (28 July 1885 – 3 October 1968) was a Norwegian politician for the Communist Party.

Jenssen was born in Evenes Municipality. He was elected to the Norwegian Parliament from the Market towns of Østfold and Akershus counties in 1945, but was not re-elected in 1949 as the Communist Party dropped from 11 to 0 seats in Parliament.

Markussen was a member of the executive committee of the city council of Fredrikstad Municipality during the terms 1919–1922 and 1922–1925.

Jenssen graduated as cand.philol. from University of Oslo 1911. He worked as a teacher, and 1931–55 as headmaster of Sarpsborg secondary school.
