= Einar Osland =

Norwegian politician

Einar Osland (17 December 1886 – 16 February 1955) was a Norwegian politician for the Liberal Party.

He was born in Lavik og Brekke Municipality. He was elected to the Norwegian Parliament from the Market towns of Vest-Agder and Rogaland counties in 1950, but was not re-elected in 1954. He had previously served in the position of deputy representative during the term 1945–1930 and 1949.

Osland held various positions in the municipal council of Haugesund Municipality from 1925 to 1955, except for a period between 1940 and 1945 during the German occupation of Norway. He served as deputy mayor in 1931–1934 and mayor in 1947–1949.
