= Ole Mikal Kobbe =

Norwegian military officer and politician

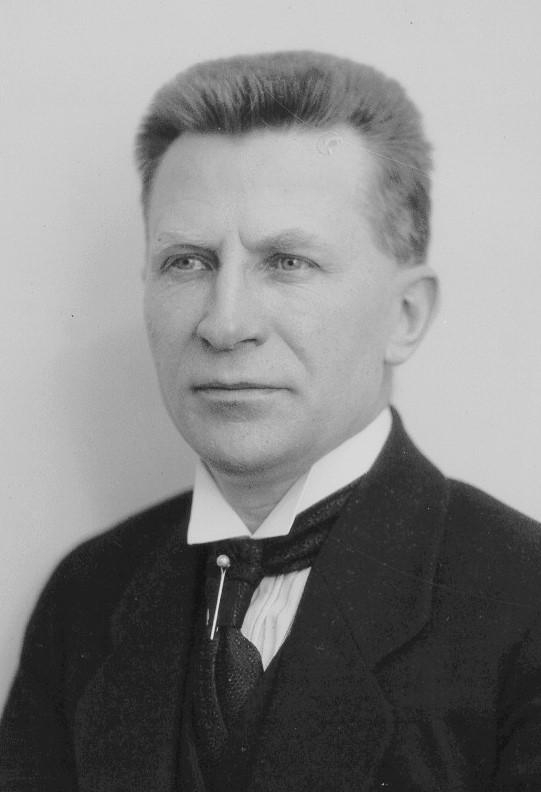
Ole Mikal Kobbe

Ole Mikal Kobbe (5 August 1881 – 21 August 1955) was a Norwegian military officer and politician for the Conservative Party.

== Biography ==
Ole Mikal Jakobsen Kobbe was born at Bodø in Nordland, Norway. His parents were Jacob Olsen (1833–1908) and Ellen Marie Øiesvold (1849–1932). He attended the Norwegian Military Academy (Krigsskolen) from which he graduated in 1903. He entered the military becoming Captain in 1914 and Major in 1930. In 1911, he went to work for a paper mill operated by Lundemo Bruk at Orkla Grube-Aktiebolag. In 1921, Kobbe moved to Trondheim where he worked for the Finance Council of Trondheim Municipality from 1921 to 1926. Kobbe was an office manager from 1926 to 1927. He served as a financial adviser in Trondheim municipality from 1933 to 1949. He was the chairman of the newspaper Adresseavisen from 1924 to 1954.

Kobbe was a member of Trondheim City Council 1931–1934. He was elected to the Norwegian Parliament from the Market towns of Sør-Trøndelag and Nord-Trøndelag counties in 1950, but was not re-elected in 1954. He was awarded the King's Medal of Merit (Kongens fortjenstmedalje) in silver during 1906 and was appointed in 1948 as a Knight 1st class in the Order of St. Olav.
