= Jens Marcus Mottré =

Norwegian politician (1886–1966)

Jens Marcus Mottré (4 April 1886 - 10 April 1966) was a Norwegian politician for the Conservative Party.

He served as a deputy representative to the Norwegian Parliament from Buskerud during the term 1945–1949.
