= Erling Fredriksfryd =

Norwegian politician

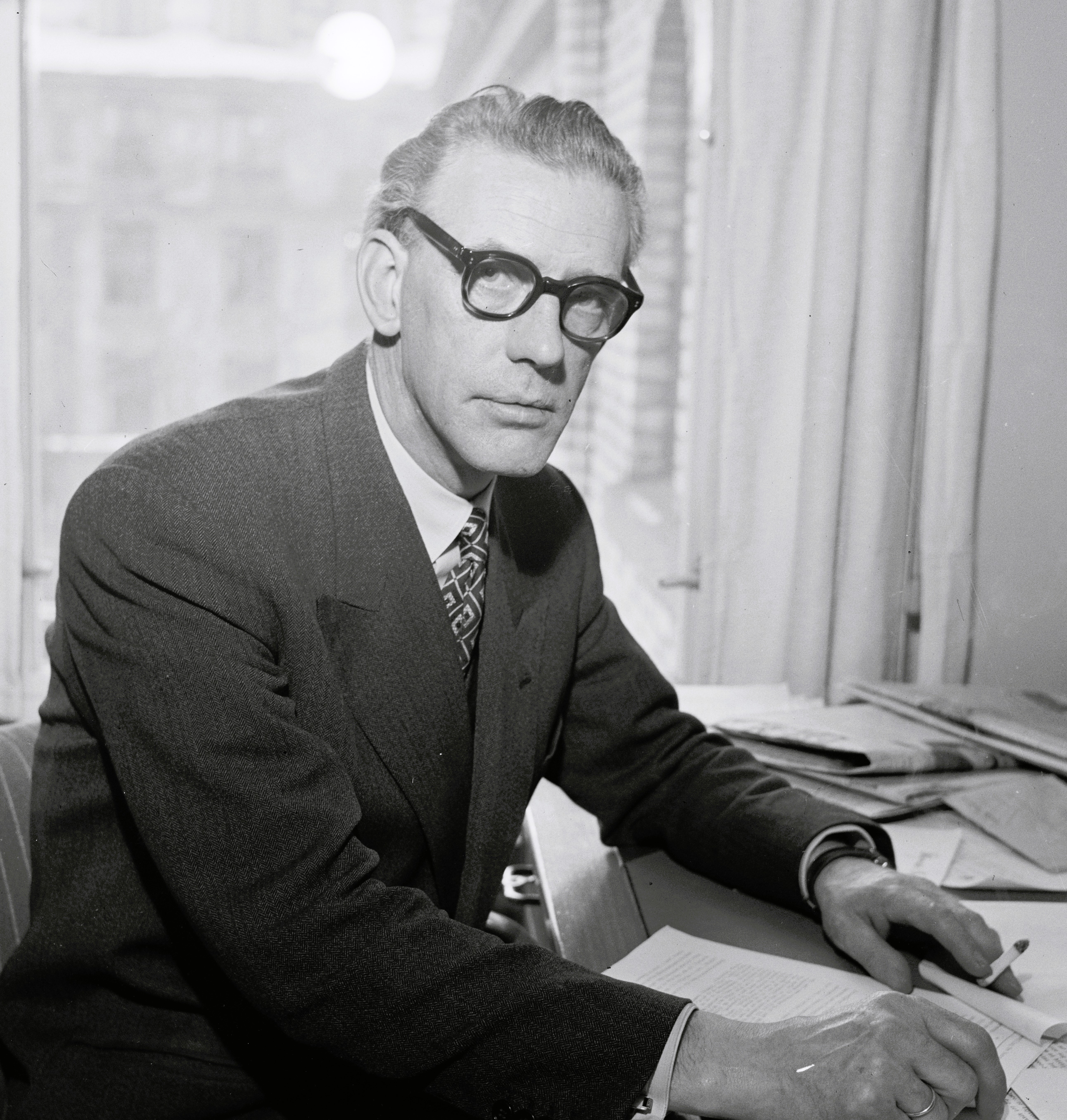
Erling Fredriksfryd

Erling Fredriksfryd (7 February 1905 – 17 January 1977) was a Norwegian politician for the Conservative Party.

He was born in Idd.

He was elected to the Norwegian Parliament from the Market towns of Østfold and Akershus in 1945, and was re-elected on four occasions.

Fredriksfryd was also involved in local politics in Halden city.
