= Marius Nygaard Smith-Petersen =

American physician

- Born: 1886; Grimstad
- Died: 1953
- Citizenship: United States
- Scientific career
- Fields: surgery

Marius Nygaard Smith-Petersen (November 14, 1886 – May 1953) was a Norwegian-American physician and orthopaedic surgeon.

== Background ==
Smith-Petersen was among the most prominent and innovative of orthopaedic surgeons of the first half of the 20th century according to the Clinical Orthopaedics and Related Research Journal (CORR). Readers (of CORR) are directed to his works on a new approach to treating fractures of the neck of the femur, mould arthroplasty, osteotomy of the spine, and continuous irrigation for osteomyelitis, all republished as Classics in CORR as examples of his innovative spirit.

Smith-Petersen was the son of Morten Smith-Petersen and Kaia Jensine Rosalie Ursin, he was born on November 14, 1886, in the coastal town of Grimstad in Aust-Agder County, Norway. He died the 16th of June, 1953 in Boston, Massachusetts, at the age of 65, he died suddenly of a heart disorder, shortly after performing a successful hip replacement operation on one of his most famous patients, television, talk-show host, Arthur Godfrey. For many generations the Smith-Petersens were a prominent mercantile family in the cities of eastern Norway. His paternal, grandfather Morten Smith-Petersen (1817-1872) owned and operated a shipbuilding company where he built a great fleet of merchant sailing vessels from his shipyard known as Hasseldalen in Grimstad, Norway. Morten was also a member of Stortinget (Norwegian Parliament) and was known as a principal supporter of free trade and the establishment of "Norwegian Veritas". Marius' paternal grandmother was Katrinka von der Lippe (1824-1890) she was the daughter of Bishop Jacob von der Lippe, a member of Norwegian Parliament and the Bishop of Kristiansand, Norway. Maruis' father, also named Morten Smith-Petersen was considered a brilliant young lawyer with great promise, who in 1888 he died suddenly of pneumonia, when Marius was only two years old. His mother, Kaia was an accomplished violinist, trained by her father, Frederik Ursin a conductor and prominent violinist of Christiania, now Oslo, Norway. Kaia was playing trios with her father, and composer, pianist Edvard Grieg at the age of twelve. After the death of her husband Kaia moved from Grimstad to Oslo, Norway with her four sons, of whom Marius was the youngest. In 1903 at the age of sixteen, Marius and his mother, Kaia immigrated to the U.S. and settled in Milwaukee, Wisconsin. There he attended and was graduated from West Side High School in 1906. He then matriculated at the University of Chicago for one year, then transferred and graduated from the University of Wisconsin, receiving a B.S. in 1910. He worked as a laboratory assistant to Nobel Prize winner (1944) physiologist, Dr. Joseph Erlanger while attending the Medical School at the University of Wisconsin. Marius Smith-Petersen then transferred to Harvard Medical School in Cambridge, Massachusetts earning his degree in 1914. His general surgical internship was served at the Peter Bent Brigham Hospital in Boston, Massachusetts, under the pioneering neurosurgeon, Harvey Williams Cushing, M.D. The knowledge, skills and techniques he acquired from this association had a profound influence on his surgical career. He served in France during World War I with the First Harvard Medical Unit at the American Ambulance Hospital in Paris, France. His orthopaedic foundation was laid under Dr. E. G. Brackett at the Massachusetts General Hospital. Smith-Petersen, often called "Mads" by his friends, went into private practice in Boston, Massachusetts, in 1923. He served as assistant instructor in orthopaedic surgery at Harvard Medical School from 1920 to 1930, as instructor in orthopaedic surgery at Harvard Medical School from 1930 to 1946, as clinical professor of orthopaedic surgery at Harvard Medical School from 1935 to 1946 and as chief of orthopaedic service at Massachusetts General Hospital from 1929 to 1946 and as consultant to The Surgeon General from 1942-1945. He was internationally known for the development of the Smith-Petersen nail and hip nailing techniques and for hip-mold arthroplasty. He was awarded the Grand Cross of the Order of St. Olav by the King of Norway. He was a brilliant surgeon and a gifted professor. He married Hilda Whitney Dickinson daughter of Charles P. Dickinson and Susan Cushing of Lunenburg, Massachusetts, they had four children and resided in Newton, Massachusetts.

== Career ==
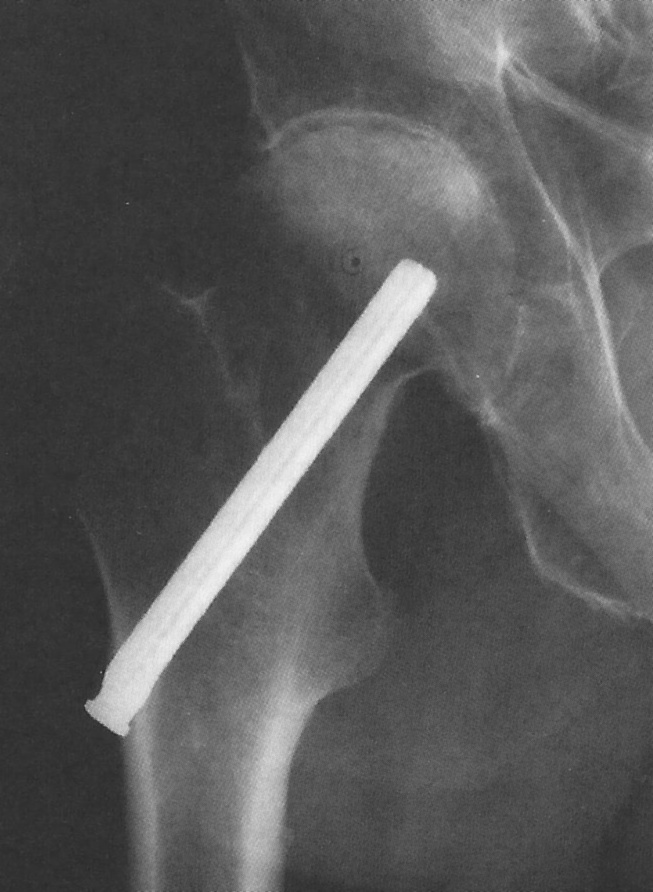
Smith-Petersen nail, 32 years after implantation

From 1923 until his death in 1953, he carried on an active orthopedic surgery practice while successively serving as instructor, assistant clinical professor, and clinical professor of orthopaedic surgery at Harvard. In 1929 he was appointed chief of orthopaedic surgery at the Massachusetts General Hospital. In 1925, Smith-Petersen introduced the three-flanged steel nail for insertion across the fracture site in hip fractures, an innovation that considerably improved recovery and mortality rates from hip fractures.

In May 1953 he performed successful surgery on entertainer Arthur Godfrey, who had been in pain for over 20 years after an auto accident. Smith-Petersen died just days after his surgery on Godfrey.
