= Sven Nielsen =

Norwegian politician (1883–1958)

Sven Nielsen (18 March 1883 – 21 January 1958) was a Norwegian politician for the Conservative Party.

He was elected to the Norwegian Parliament from the Market towns of Vest-Agder and Rogaland counties in 1934, and was re-elected on three occasions. Between 9 March and 25 June 1945 he was appointed Minister of Trade, Shipping, Industry, Crafts and Fisheries.

Born in Stavanger, Nielsen was a member of Harstad city council from 1919 to 1922, and then served as mayor from 1922 to 1925. He later held various positions in Stavanger city council from 1934 to 1947, except for a period between 1940 and 1945 during the German occupation of Norway.

Having graduated as cand.philos. 1903, he worked as a teacher and CEO. He also reached the rank of major in the Norwegian Army, and from 1941 to 1945, during the German occupation of Norway, he directed the Office of the Auditor General of Norway-in-exile in London.

For his activities, he was awarded with being a Commander of the Order of St. Olav, the Grand Cross of the Order of the Falcon, and as a Knight of the Order of the White Rose.
