= Carl Julius Alvin Westerlund =

Norwegian politician

Carl Julius Alvin Westerlund (2 June 1885 – 14 May 1952) was a Norwegian politician for the Labour Party.

He was born in Bodø.

He was elected to the Norwegian Parliament from the Market towns of Vest-Agder and Rogaland counties in 1945, but was not re-elected in 1949. He had previously served in the position of deputy representative during the term 1925–1927.

Westerlund held various positions in the municipal council for Haugesund Municipality from 1913 to 1940, serving as mayor in 1919 and 1922.
