= Alfred Sigurd Nilsen =

Norwegian politician

Alfred Sigurd Nilsen (4 September 1891 – 2 August 1977) was a Norwegian politician for the Labour Party. Born in Trondenes, he was elected to the Norwegian Parliament from the electoral district Market towns of Nordland, Troms and Finnmark in 1937, and was re-elected on two occasions.

Nilsen held various positions in Narvik city council from 1925 to 1940 and 1945 to 1960, serving as mayor in the periods 1945–1947 and 1947–1951.
