= Kjell Tellander =

Norwegian politician

Kjell Tellander (14 March 1899 – 24 September 1968) was a Norwegian politician for the Conservative Party.

He was elected to the Norwegian Parliament from the Market towns of Nordland, Troms and Finnmark in 1945. He was not listed at the conservative party ballot, but was elected by popular votes (cumulative votes, where voters are free to remove a person from the ballot and replace that name/person with another). He was not re-elected in 1949.

He was born in Oslo, enrolled as a student in 1917 and graduated as cand.jur. in 1922. He was acting stipendiary magistrate (byfogd) in Tromsø from 1924 to 1926 and chief administrative officer (rådmann) of Bodø from 1928 to 1967. He was never involved in local politics, and felt his election to the Norwegian Parliament was a call for him as a district representative, rather than a representative for a specific political party.
