= Market towns of Hedmark and Oppland counties =

Former electoral district in Norway

The Market towns of Hedmark and Oppland counties (Norwegian: Kjøpstedene i Hedmark og Oppland fylker) was an electoral district for parliamentary elections in Norway. It comprised the market towns (Norwegian: kjøpsteder) of Hamar and Kongsvinger in Hedmark county and Lillehammer and Gjøvik in Oppland county.

The district was established ahead of the 1921 Norwegian parliamentary election following the change from single member constituencies to plural member constituencies in 1919.

Following changes in the national policy on market towns in 1952, these electoral districts were abolished ahead of the 1953 Norwegian parliamentary election. Instead, each county became one electoral district, and for election purposes the towns were integrated into their respective counties.

The cities except for Kongsvinger are known as the Mjøsa Cities, and share much history. Also as an electoral district, the cities had been tied together. Before single-member constituencies were introduced in 1905, there were two constituencies: Kristiania, Hønefoss og Kongsvinger with three members in the 1903 election and Hamar, Lillehammer og Gjøvik with one member. After 1905 the cities were grouped together as Lillehammer, Hamar, Gjøvik og Kongsvinger; in other words identical to the electoral district established after 1919. The first four elections in Lillehammer, Hamar, Gjøvik og Kongsvinger were won by Axel Thallaug. In 1913 Thallaug proposed splitting the electoral district in two, giving one member to Hamar og Kongsvinger and one to Lillehammer og Gjøvik. The proposal was supported by decision in the executive committees of Lillehammer and Kongsvinger city councils. In 1914 it reached the Standing Committee on Constitutional Affairs, where the representatives voted 5 for and 2 against (they also voted to divide Larvik og Sandefjord). It did not come to fruition.

== Representatives ==
The following representatives were elected from the Market towns of Hedmark and Oppland counties:

	Representative 1	Representative 2	Representative 3
1921	Flakstad, H	Monsen, A	Fougner, FV
1924	Flakstad, H	Clifton, H	Monsen, NKP
1927	Monsen, A	Bühring-Dehli, H	Endresen, A
1930	Bühring-Dehli, H	Monsen, A	Svendsen, H
1933	Monsen, A	Svendsen, H	Ødegaard, A
1936	Monsen, A	Mustad, H	Ødegaard, A
1945	Monsen, A	Burull, H	Hove, A
1949	Pedersen, A	Hove, A	Granum, H

Legend:

- NKP = Communist Party, Norges Kommunistiske Parti
- A = Labour Party, Det Norske Arbeiderparti
- SDA = Social Democratic Labour Party, Norges Socialdemokratiske Arbeiderparti
- RF = Radical People's Party (Worker Democrats), Det Radikale Folkeparti (Arbeiderdemokratene)
- KrF = Christian Democratic Party, Kristelig Folkeparti
- B = Farmers' Party, Bondepartiet
- V = Liberal Party, Venstre
- FV = Liberal Left Party, Frisinnede Venstre
- H = Conservative Party, Høyre
