= Eystein Fjærli =

- Born: August 12, 1917; Molde, Norway
- Died: 1987 (aged 69–70)
- Occupation: Military officer

Eystein Olavsson Fjærli (August 12, 1917 – 1987) was a Norwegian career officer (a lieutenant colonel), defense strategist, author, and politician.

Fjærli was born in Molde, the son of the politician Olav Eysteinson Fjærli. When Germany invaded Norway in 1940, he was studying philology, and as a conscript sergeant he participated in fighting in Eastern Norway. In the fall of 1940 he went on an intelligence mission to the United Kingdom, where he joined the Norwegian Brigade in Scotland. In the fall of 1943, Fjærli became a liaison officer in the British 52nd Mountain Division, which fought in the Netherlands. On May 9, 1945 Fjærli returned to Norway as the chief liaison officer for the Allied forces in Southern Norway.

After the war, Fjærli was a career officer, with service in the Independent Norwegian Brigade Group in Germany, the United Nations, and NATO. He frequently participated in discussions on political and military issues.

Fjærli also wrote works on military history. He contributed articles to Morgenbladet, Nå, Vi Menn, and other periodicals.

== Selected works ==
- Ikke-militært forsvar og norsk sikkerhetspolitikk (Non-Military Defense and Norwegian Security Policy, discussion paper, 1967), with Johan Jørgen Holst and Harald Rønning
- NATO: strategi for frihet (NATO: Strategy for Freedom, 1968)
- Tar vi forsvaret alvorlig? (Do We Take Defense Seriously? 1969)
- Krigens Svalbard (Wartime Svalbard, 1979)
- Den norske hær i Storbritannia 1940–1945 (The Norwegian Army in the United Kingdom 1940–1945, 1982)
