= Svein Olsen Øraker =

Norwegian politician

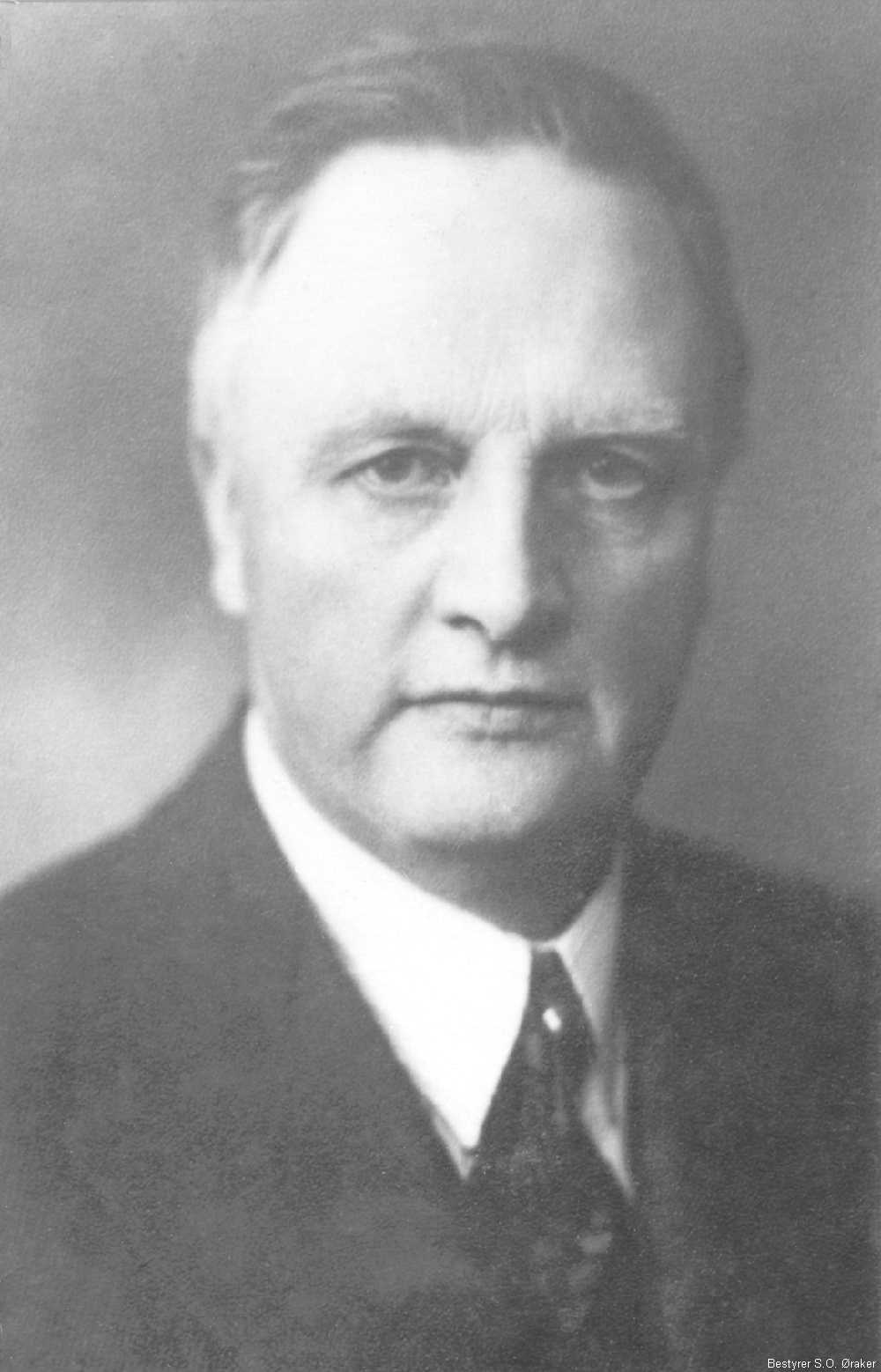
- Svein Olsen Øraker.

Member of the Norway Parliament for Market towns of Sør-Trøndelag and Nord-Trøndelag counties
- In office 1937–Unknown

Svein Olsen Øraker (10 August 1886 in Vestre Slidre Municipality – 27 September 1963) was a Norwegian politician for the Labour Party.

He was elected to the Norwegian Parliament from the Market towns of Sør-Trøndelag and Nord-Trøndelag counties in 1937, and was re-elected on one occasion. He previously served as deputy representative during the terms 1922–1924, 1925–1927, 1928–1930, 1931–1933, and 1934–1936.

Øraker was much involved in local politics. He served on the municipal council of Hammerfest Municipality as deputy mayor in 1916–1917 and mayor in 1918. He then held various positions in the municipal council for Levanger Municipality from 1922 to 1945, serving as deputy mayor in 1922–1924, 1928 and 1937–1939 and mayor in 1927, 1928–1930 and 1945–1947.

Outside politics Øraker worked with education. Between 1907 and 1947 he was a teacher in Vardal, Valdres, Hammerfest, and Levanger. From 1949 to 1956 he was the school director of Oslo, after being acting school director from 1947 to 1949.
