= Sven Hans Jørgen Svensen =

Norwegian politician

Sven Hans Jørgen Svensen (30 August 1856 – 15 October 1942) was a Norwegian schoolteacher, school inspector and politician.

Svensen was born in Kristiansand to sailor Harald Svensen and Gurine Johanne Hansdatter. He was elected representative to the Stortinget from the Market towns of Vest-Agder and Rogaland counties for the period 1922–1924, for the Liberal Party. For the following term he was a deputy representative.
