= Christen Eriksen Berg =

Norwegian telegrapher and politician

- Born: 20 November 1864; Brevik, Norway
- Died: 5 August 1926 (aged 61)
- Occupations: Telegrapher; Politician

Christen Eriksen Berg (20 November 1864 – 5 August 1926) was a Norwegian telegrapher and politician.

He was born in Brevik to Andreas Gerhard Berg and Gina Thomsen. He served as mayor of Kragerø Municipality (1921). He was elected representative to the Storting for the period 1922–1924, for the Liberal Party.
