= Ludvig Enge =

Norwegian civil servant and politician

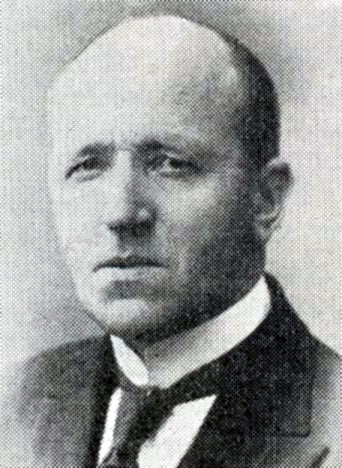

Ludvig Elmar Hegge Olsen Enge (11 September 1878 – 16 August 1953) was a Norwegian civil servant and politician for the Labour Party. He was an MP, mayor and chief administrative officer of Sarpsborg.

== Early life and career ==
He was born in Vik i Helgeland as a son of fisher Ole Peder Olsen Enge (1845–1930) and Kristine Johanna Johansen (1845–1878), and a first cousin of Cornelius Lind Enge. He worked as a fisher and land labourer until the age of twenty. In 1899 he moved to Sarpsborg where he worked as an electrical fitter in the company Borregaard.

== Later career ==
In 1901 he helped found the first trade union for Borregaard workers, and in 1903 he co-founded the Labour Party branch in Sarpsborg. In 1907 he left Borregaard to become local editor of Smaalenenes Social-Demokrat. In 1909 he left the newspaper to work in Sarpsborg kommunale elektrisitetsverk. From 1916 to 1918 he managed the city office of provisioning.

He was a member of Sarpsborg city council from 1904 to 1918, serving as deputy mayor in 1907–1910 and 1913–1916 and mayor in 1917 and 1918. He was elected to the Parliament of Norway in 1909, 1912 and 1918, representing the constituency of Sarpsborg. In the intermittent election in 1915, he lost the seat to Liberal candidate, former mayor of Sarpsborg Carl Henry Fyhn with 1,761 against 1,814 votes.

In the autumn of 1918, Sarpsborg city council decided to hire Enge as burgomaster (later: chief administrative officer) of the city. In October 1918 the Ministry of Justice followed suit and appointed Enge. According to historian Hans Olav Lahlum, Enge was the first burgomaster in Norway who belonged to the Labour Party. He started on 1 January 1919 and left the job in March 1943. He was fired by the Nazi authorities during the German occupation of Norway, and imprisoned between February and March 1944. He then returned to the job as chief administrative officer.

Enge was also a supervisory council member of Borregaard, Sarpsborg Sparebank and Sarpsborg og Oplands Kreditbank. He died in 1953. A bust of Enge in Sarpsborg was revealed in 1957.
