= Edvin Sevrin Endresen =

Norwegian politician

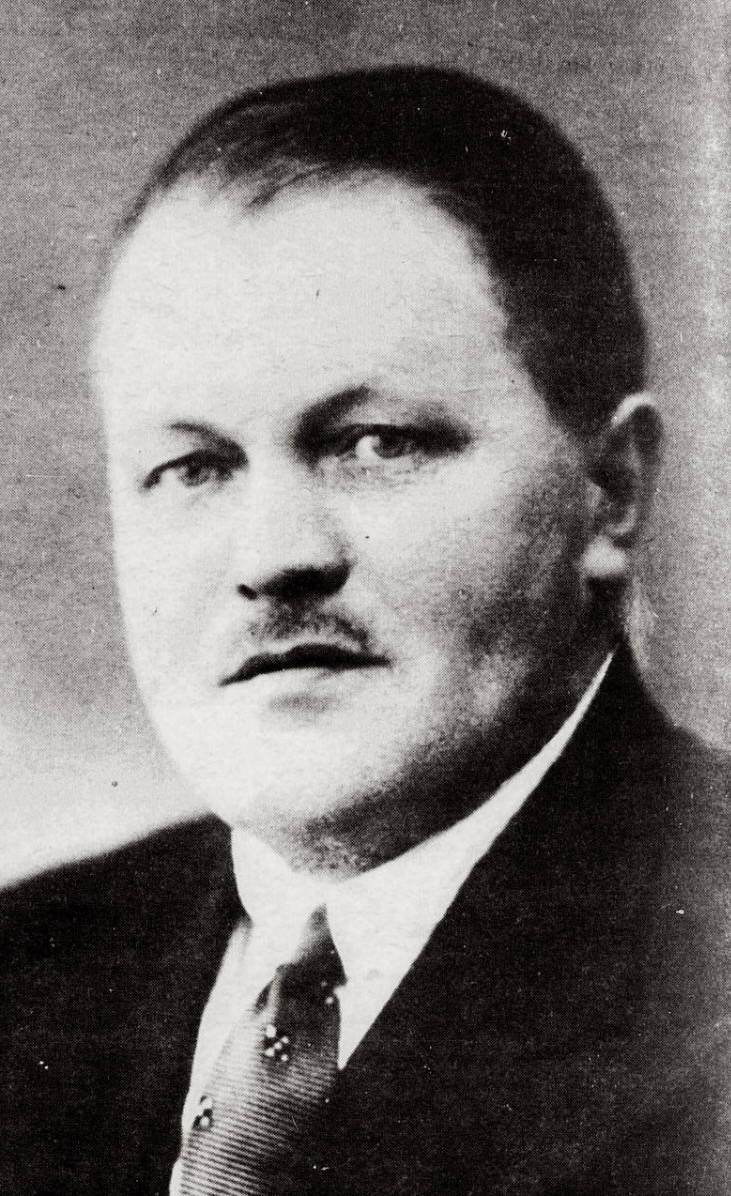
- Born: 11 October 1892; Vestre Moland Municipality, Norway
- Died: 21 July 1968 (aged 75)
- Occupation: Politician

Edvin Sevrin Endresen (11 October 1892 – 21 July 1968) was a Norwegian politician.

He was born in Vestre Moland Municipality to Engel Endresen and Anna Karlsen. He was elected representative to the Storting for the period 1928–1930, for the Labour Party, and was deputy representative from 1934 to 1936, and from 1937 to 1945.
