= Ivar Aarseth =

Norwegian politician

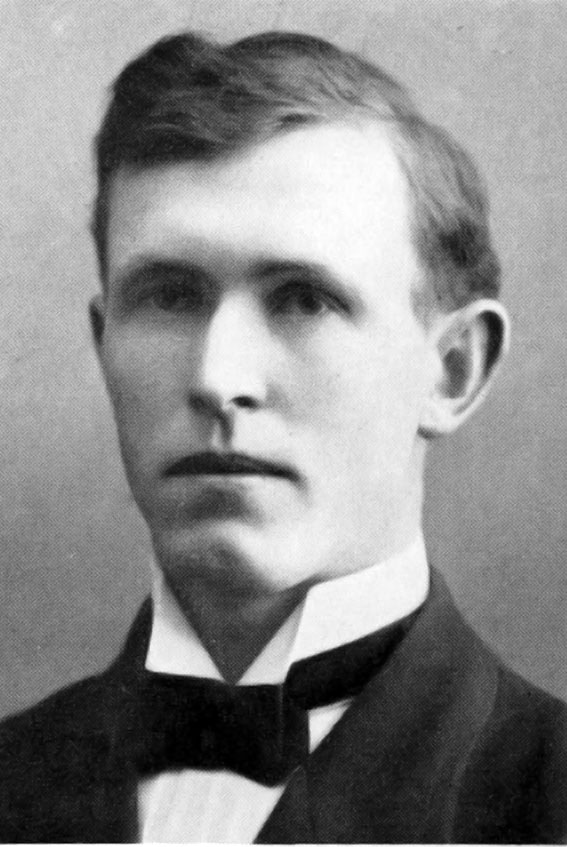
- Born: 5 October 1889; Veøy Municipality, Norway
- Died: 31 July 1972 (aged 82); Trondheim Municipality, Norway
- Occupation: Politician

Ivar Aarseth (5 October 1889 – 31 July 1972) was a Norwegian politician.

He was born in Veøy Municipality to farmers Knut Aarseth and Oline Horsgaard. He was elected representative to the Storting for the periods 1925–1927, 1928–1930, 1934–1936 and 1937–1945, for the Labour Party. During the German occupation of Norway, he was imprisoned and held at the Berg internment camp from October 1944 to March 1945.
