= Oscar Olsen =

Norwegian politician

Oscar Olsen (23 September 1908 – 4 December 2004) was a Norwegian politician for the Liberal Party.

He was elected to the Norwegian Parliament from the Market towns of Vest-Agder and Rogaland counties in 1945, but was not re-elected in 1949. Instead he served as a deputy representative during the terms 1950–1953 and 1961–1965.

Olsen was born in Kristiansand and was a member of the Kristiansand municipality council from 1947 to 1963 and 1975 to 1979, and served as mayor in the period 1963–1966.
