= Henry Jacobsen =

Norwegian politician

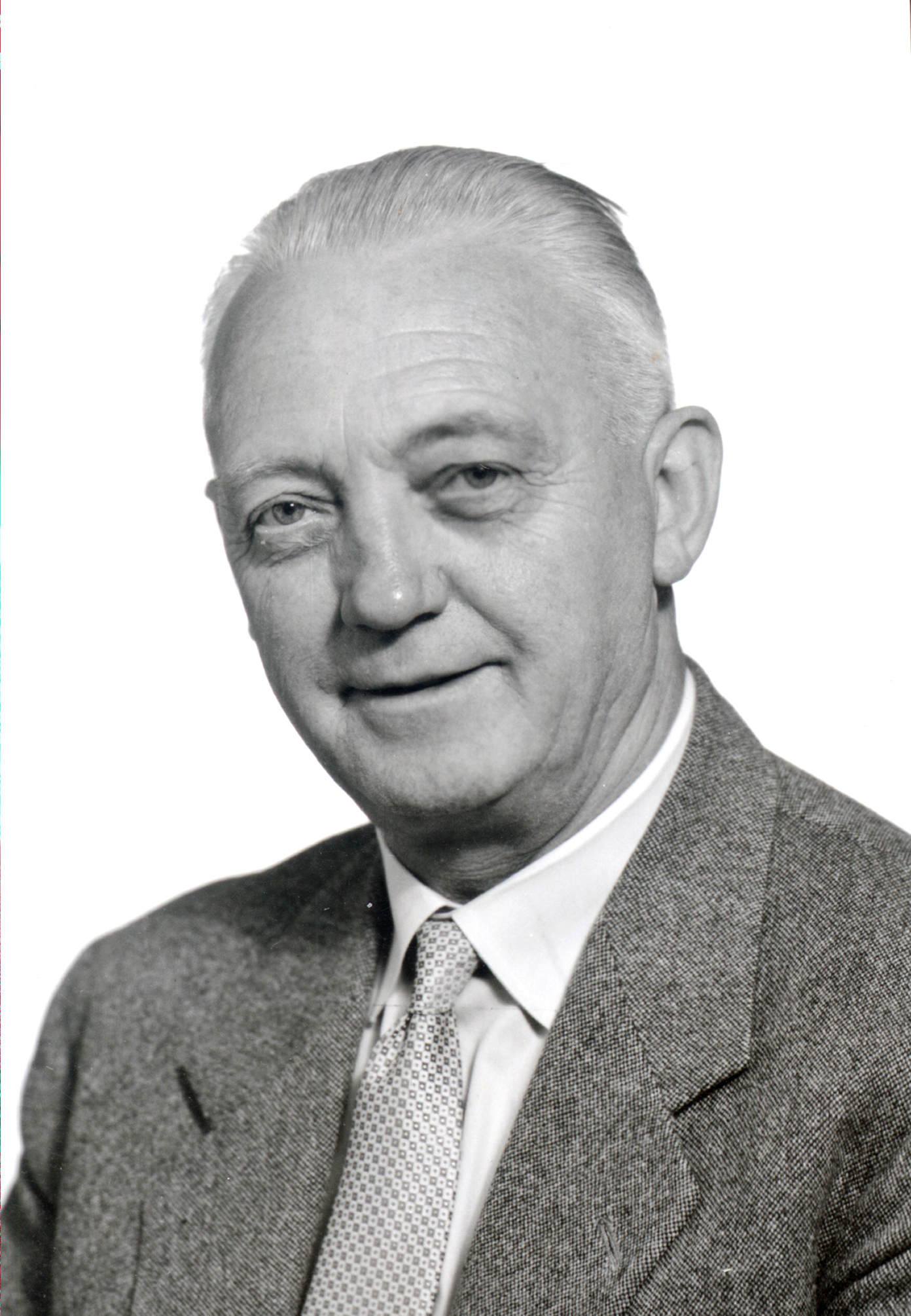
Henry Jacobsen

Henry Jacobsen (2 December 1898 – 16 January 1964) was a Norwegian politician for the Labour Party.

He was born in Rygge.

He was elected to the Norwegian Parliament from the Market towns of Østfold and Akershus in 1945, and was re-elected on four occasions. He had previously served in the position of deputy representative during the term 1934–1936. Towards the end of his fifth term, he died and was replaced by Arvid Johanson.

Jacobsen was a member of Rygge municipality council in 1925–1928, and later of Moss city council from 1931 to 1960, serving as mayor from 1945. He was also a member of Østfold county council 1925–1928, 1931–1934, 1934–1937 and 1937–1938
