= Nils Emaus Nilsen =

Norwegian politician

Nils Emaus Nilsen (24 May 1886 – 4 April 1976) was a Norwegian politician for the Labour Party.

He was born in Mosjøen.

He was elected to the Norwegian Parliament from the Market towns of Vest-Agder and Rogaland in 1950, but was not re-elected in 1954.

Nilsen held various positions in Haugesund city council in 1922–1931, 1937–1940 and 1945–1953, serving as mayor during the term 1945–1947.
