= Nils Erik Flakstad (politician) =

Norwegian politician

Nils Erik Flakstad (23 March 1876 – 9 December 1939) was a Norwegian businessperson and politician for the Conservative Party.

He was born in Åmot Municipality as the son of a businessman. His maternal grandfather was Nils Jønsberg. He finished his secondary education in Hamar in 1894, enrolled in law studies and graduated as cand.jur. in 1899. He worked in Moss for two years before being hired as an attorney in Hamar in 1901. He was then CEO of the local savings bank from 1911 to 1931, and CEO of the local brewery from 1921 to 1937. From 1927 he was a member of the board of employers' organisation Norwegian Brewers as well as of Vinmonopolet.

Flakstad was a member of the municipal council of Hamar Municipality from 1919 to 1922 and 1928 to 1931. He was elected to the Norwegian Parliament in 1922 and 1925, representing the Market towns of Hedmark and Oppland counties. From 1926 to 1927 he was the President of the Lagting. As such he chaired the Constitutional Court of the Realm during the impeachment case towards former Prime Minister Abraham Berge and six of his cabinet members. All seven were found not guilty.

Flakstad also served as a delegate to the Inter-Parliamentary Union Congress in Paris, France in 1927.
