= Anders Hove (politician) =

Norwegian politician

Anders Hove (8 January 1885–14 February 1978) was a Norwegian politician for the Labour Party.

He was born in Fåberg Municipality. He was elected to the Norwegian Parliament from the Market towns of Hedmark and Oppland counties in 1945, and was re-elected on two occasions.

Hove held various positions on the municipal council for Lillehammer Municipality, and served as deputy mayor there in 1945.
