= Haakon Oliver Karlsen =

Norwegian politician

- Born: 27 June 1888; Fredrikstad, Norway
- Died: 27 February 1962 (aged 73)
- Occupation: Politician

Haakon Oliver Karlsen (27 June 1888 – 27 February 1962) was a Norwegian politician.

He was born in Fredrikstad to saw mill worker Karl Efraim Karlsen and Anna Dorthea Andersen. He was elected representative to the Storting for the period 1928–1930, for the Labour Party. He served as mayor of Fredrikstad from 1925.
