= 1927 Norwegian parliamentary election =

- 17 October 1927

All 150 seats in the Storting 76 seats needed for a majority
- Turnout: 68.0%
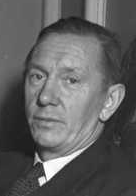

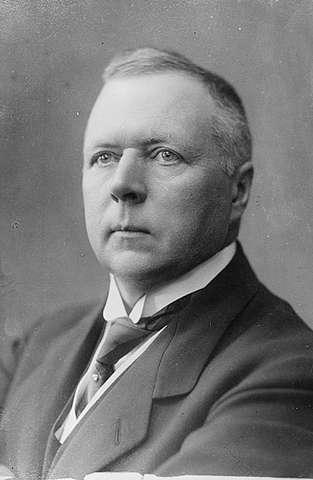

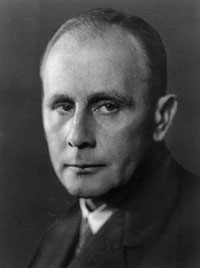

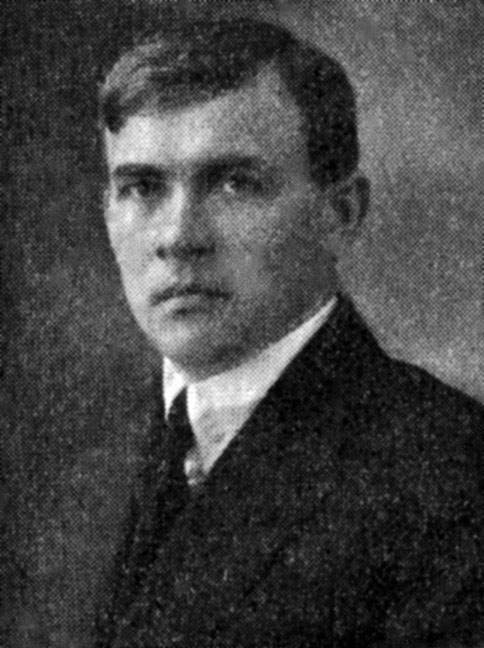
	First party	Second party	Third party
Leader	Oscar Torp	Johan Ludwig Mowinckel	C. J. Hambro
Party	Labour	Liberal	Conservative
Last election	18.44%, 24 seats	18.58%, 34 seats	32.53%, 43 seats
Seats won	59	30	29
Seat change	▲35	▼4	▼14
Popular vote	368,106	172,568	240,091 (H+FV)
Percentage	36.84%	17.27%	24.03% (H+FV)
	Fourth party	Fifth party	Sixth party
Leader	Erik Enge	Peder Furubotn	P. A. Holm
Party	Farmers'	Communist	Free-minded Liberal
Last election	13.52%, 22 seats	6.10%, 6 seats	11 seats with H
Seats won	26	3	2
Seat change	▲4	▼3	▼9
Popular vote	149,026	40,075	With H
Percentage	14.91%	4.01%	–
Prime Minister before election
Ivar Lykke
Conservative
Prime Minister after election
Ivar Lykke
Conservative

Parliamentary elections were held in Norway on 17 October 1927. The Labour Party emerged as the largest party, winning 59 of the 150 seats in the Storting, a position it has held ever since. However, the subsequent government was headed by Ivar Lykke of the Conservative Party.

== Newspaper endorsements ==
Newspaper	Party endorsed
Nordland	Free-minded Liberal Party
Tiden	Labour Party
Vestfinnmark Arbeiderblad	Labour Party
Aftenposten	Free-minded Liberal Party
Aftenposten	Conservative Party

== Results ==
Party	Votes	%	Seats	+/–
Labour Party	368,106	36.84	59	+35
Conservative Party (Note: The Conservative Party and the Free-minded Liberal Party continued their alliance, but in some constituencies the Free-minded Liberal Party ran separate lists. It won one seat on the joint lists and one seat on a separate list.)	240,091	24.03	29	–14
Free-minded Liberal Party	240,091	24.03	1	–
Liberal Party	172,568	17.27	30	–4
Farmers' Party	149,026	14.91	26	+4
Communist Party	40,075	4.01	3	–3
Free-minded Liberal Party	14,439	1.44	1	–
Radical People's Party	13,459	1.35	1	–1
National Legion	1,210	0.12	0	–
Fishermen and the Liberal People's Party	308	0.03	0	–
Wild votes	15	0.00	–	–
Total	999,297	100.00	150	0
Valid votes	999,297	98.88		
Invalid/blank votes	11,328	1.12		
Total votes	1,010,625	100.00		
Registered voters/turnout	1,484,409	68.08		
Source: Nohlen & Stöver, Norges Offisielle Statistikk

=== Seat distribution ===
Constituency	Total seats	Seats won					
Constituency	Total seats	Ap	H–FV	V	B	K	RF
Akershus	7	3	3		1		
Aust-Agder	4	1	1	1	1		
Bergen	5	1	2	1		1	
Buskerud	5	3	1		1		
Finnmark	3	2		1			
Hedmark	7	3	1		2	1	
Hordaland	8	1	1	4	2		
Market towns of Akershus and Østfold	4	2	2				
Market towns of Buskerud	3	2	1				
Market towns of Hedmark and Oppland	3	2	1				
Market towns of Møre	3	1	1	1			
Market towns of Nordland, Troms and Finnmark	4	2	1	1			
Market towns of Sør-Trøndelag and Nord-Trøndelag	5	2	2			1	
Market towns of Telemark and Aust-Agder	5	2	2	1			
Market towns of Vest-Agder and Rogaland	7	3	2	2			
Market towns of Vestfold	4	2	2				
Møre	7	1		4	2		
Nord-Trøndelag	5	2		1	2		
Nordland	8	3	2	2	1		
Oppland	6	2			3		1
Oslo	7	4	3				
Østfold	6	3	1		2		
Rogaland	5	1		2	2		
Sogn og Fjordane	5	1		2	2		
Sør-Trøndelag	6	2		2	2		
Telemark	5	2		2	1		
Troms	5	4		1			
Vest-Agder	4	1		2	1		
Vestfold	4	1	2		1		
Total	150	59	31	30	26	3	1
Source: Norges Offisielle Statistikk

== See also ==
- 1927 Conservative Party national convention
