= Svend Aadnesen Løge =

Norwegian politician and temperance activist

Svend Aadnesen Løge (3 October 1869 – 1 February 1948) was a Norwegian politician and temperance activist.

Løge was born in Time Municipality to farmer Aadne Gunleifsen Sæland and Ingeborg Nesse. He was elected representative to the Stortinget for the period 1925–1927, for the Social Democratic Labour Party of Norway. From 1927 to 1934 he was board member of the temperance organization Det norske Totalavholdsselskap; he had chaired the Stavanger chapter, where he also received honorary membership.
