= 1924 Norwegian parliamentary election =

- 21 October 1924

All 150 seats in the Storting 76 seats needed for a majority
- Turnout: 69.8%
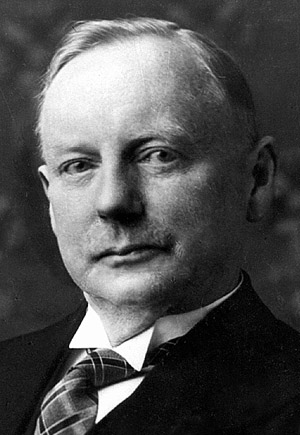

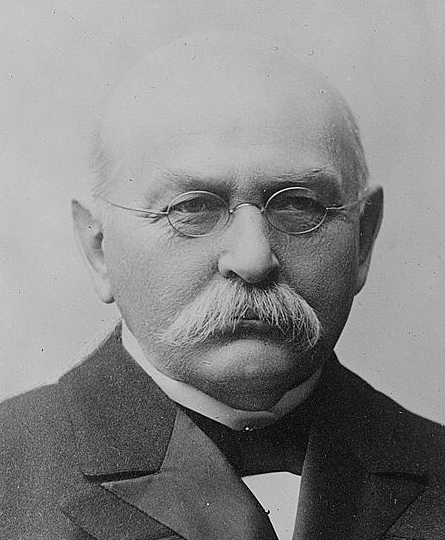

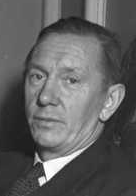

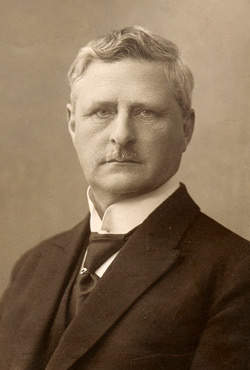

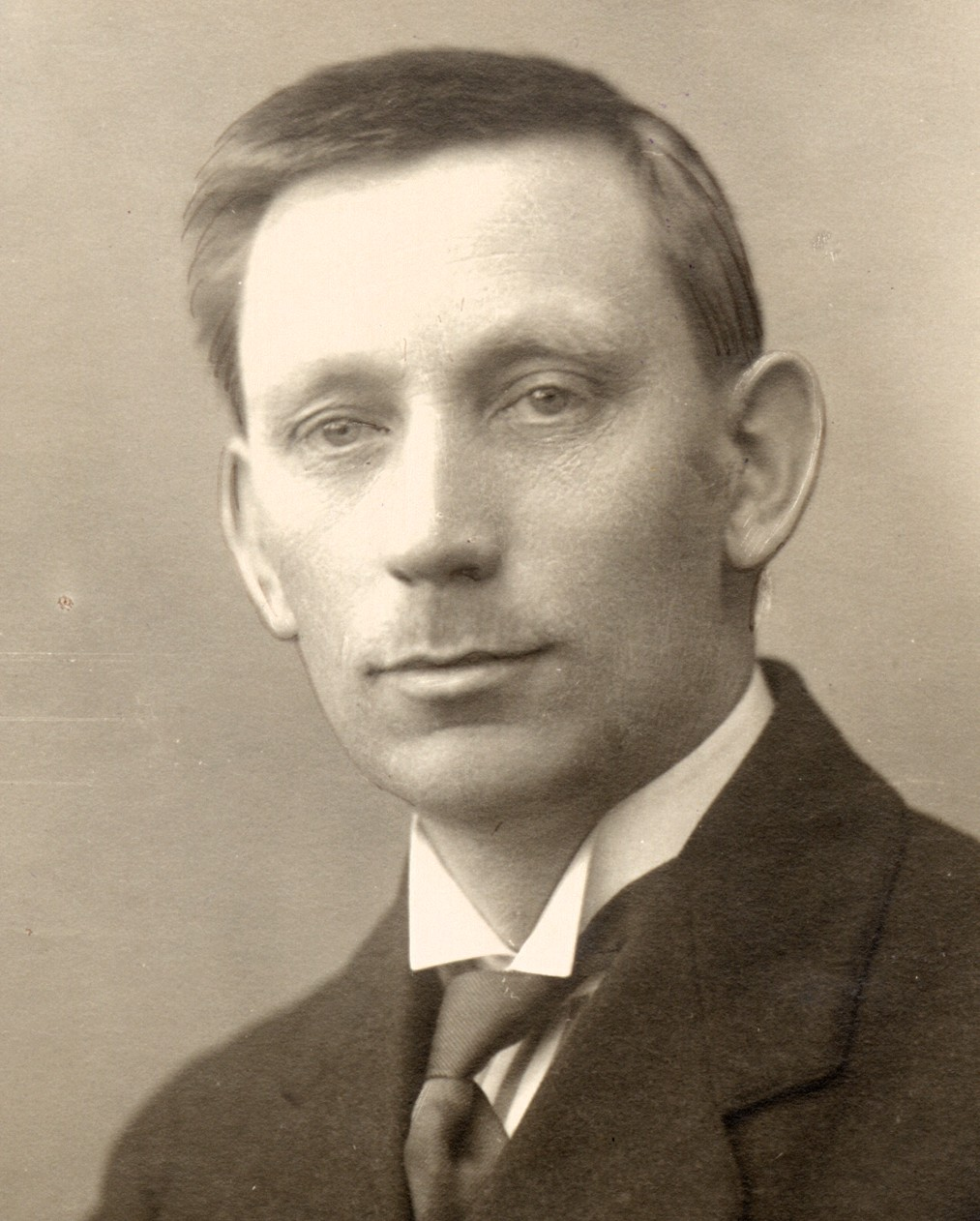
	First party	Second party	Third party
Leader	Ivar Lykke	Gunnar Knudsen	Oscar Torp
Party	Conservative	Liberal	Labour
Last election	33.31%, 42 seats	20.12%, 37 seats	21.29%, 29 seats
Seats won	43	34	24
Seat change	▲1	▼3	▼5
Popular vote	316,846 (H+FV)	180,979	179,567
Percentage	32.53% (H+FV)	18.58%	18.44%
	Fourth party	Fifth party	Sixth party
Leader	Kristoffer Høgset	Karl Wilhelm Wefring
Party	Farmers'	Free-minded Liberal	Social Democratic Labour
Last election	13.12%, 17 seats	15 seats with H	9.24%, 8 seats
Seats won	22	11	8
Seat change	▲5	▼4	0
Popular vote	131,706	Alliance with H	85,743
Percentage	13.52%	—	8.80%
	Seventh party	Eighth party
Leader	Sverre Støstad
Party	Communist	Radical People's
Last election	–	2.54%, 2 seats
Seats won	6	2
Seat change	New	0
Popular vote	59,401	17,144
Percentage	6.10%	1.76 %
Prime Minister before election
Johan Ludwig Mowinckel
Liberal
Prime Minister after election
Johan Ludwig Mowinckel
Liberal

Parliamentary elections were held in Norway on 21 October 1924. The result was a victory for the Conservative Party-Liberal Left Party alliance, which won 54 of the 150 seats in the Storting. This is, to date, the last election in which the Labour Party did not receive the most votes or the most seats in the Storting of participating parties.

== Endorsements ==
=== National daily newspapers ===
Newspaper	Party endorsed
Vestlandske Tidende	Conservative Party
Vestlandske Tidende	Free-minded Liberal Party
Sarpen	Conservative Party
Sarpen	Free-minded Liberal Party
Trondhjems Adresseavis	Conservative Party
Trondhjems Adresseavis	Free-minded Liberal Party

== Results ==
Party	Votes	%	Seats	+/–
Conservative Party	316,846	32.53	43	+1
Free-minded Liberal Party	316,846	32.53	11	–4
Liberal Party	180,979	18.58	34	–3
Labour Party	179,567	18.44	24	–5
Farmers' Party	131,706	13.52	22	+5
Social Democratic Labour Party	85,743	8.80	8	0
Communist Party	59,401	6.10	6	New
Radical People's Party	17,144	1.76	2	0
Other parties	2,493	0.26	0	–
Wild votes	62	0.01	–	–
Total	973,941	100.00	150	0
Valid votes	973,941	98.66		
Invalid/blank votes	13,244	1.34		
Total votes	987,185	100.00		
Registered voters/turnout	1,412,441	69.89		
Source: Nohlen & Stöver

=== Seat distribution ===
Constituency	Total seats	Seats won						
Constituency	Total seats	H–FV	V	Ap	B	Sd	K	RF
Akershus	7	3		2	1	1		
Aust-Agder	4	1	1	1	1			
Bergen	5	2	1				2	
Buskerud	5	2		2	1			
Finnmark	3	1	1	1				
Hedmark	7	2		2	2		1	
Hordaland	8	2	4		1		1	
Kristiana	7	4		3				
Market towns of Akershus and Østfold	4	2				2		
Market towns of Buskerud	3	2		1				
Market towns of Hedmark and Oppland	3	2					1	
Market towns of Møre	3	1	1			1		
Market towns of Nordland, Troms and Finnmark	4	2	1	1				
Market towns of Sør-Trøndelag and Nord-Trøndelag	5	3		1			1	
Market towns of Telemark and Aust-Agder	5	3	1	1				
Market towns of Vest-Agder and Rogaland	7	3	2	1		1		
Market towns of Vestfold	4	3				1		
Møre	7	1	4		2			
Nord-Trøndelag	5		2	1	2			
Nordland	8	4	2	1	1			
Oppland	6			1	3			2
Østfold	6	2			2	2		
Rogaland	5	1	3		1			
Sogn og Fjordane	5	1	3		1			
Sør-Trøndelag	6	1	2	2	1			
Telemark	5	1	2	1	1			
Troms	5	1	2	2				
Vest-Agder	4	1	2		1			
Vestfold	4	3			1			
Total	150	54	34	24	22	8	6	2
Source: Norges Offisielle Statistikk
