= Carl Severin Bentzen =

Norwegian politician

- Born: September 13, 1882; Norway
- Died: 1956 (aged 73–74)
- Occupations: Tailor, politician
- Known for: Labour and Social Democratic Labour parties

Carl Severin Bentzen, often called C. S. Bentzen (13 September 1882 – 1956) was a Norwegian tailor and politician for the Labour and Social Democratic Labour parties.

He was a son of tailor Wilhelm Julius Bentzen (1855–1911) and Sofie Nilson (1859–1936), and learned the trade from his father. He studied further in Kristiania, Copenhagen and Berlin. He completed his Gesellenprüfung in 1904, and acquired burghership in Hønefoss in 1911. He had joined the labour movement in 1904, and was a member of the executive committee of Hønefoss city council from 1910 to 1922, serving as mayor from 1913 to 1915. He founded the first trade union in Ringerike, in 1903, and was also involved in the temperance movement as the county leader of Det Norske Totalavholdsselskap.

He stood for general election several times, first in the single-member constituency Kongsberg og Hønefoss. In the 1912 election, Bentzen was the deputy candidate of J. O. Jarnæs, but the constituency was carried by Nils Gulliksen Berg. In the 1915 election, Bentzen (with Jarnæs as running mate) won the first round against Berg with 2,394 against 1,684 votes; but lost the second round with 2,753 against 3,038 votes. In 1918 he was however elected, and from 1919 to 1921 he served one term in the Parliament of Norway, representing the urban constituency Kongsberg, Hønefoss og Notodden. He headed his ballot in the Market towns of Buskerud county for the 1921 general election but was not re-elected.

Bentzen was a member of the Labour Party's central board from 1915 to 1918. He also represented his party in the Defence Commission of 1920. In 1921 he left the Labour Party, joined the Social Democratic Labour Party. He was a member of their national board from 1921 to 1927. The two parties then reunited. From 1923 to 1925 he was the burgomaster of Hønefoss. He was again a councilman from 1931 to 1941, and mayor briefly in 1946.

During the occupation of Norway by Nazi Germany he was arrested and incarcerated in Grini concentration camp from 20 September to 28 November 1944, then in Akershus Fortress until the war's end. He died in 1956.

Together with Anna Gulliksen (1884–1942) he had the son Torfinn Bentzen, a barrister and conservative politician.
