= Erik Vangberg =

Norwegian politician

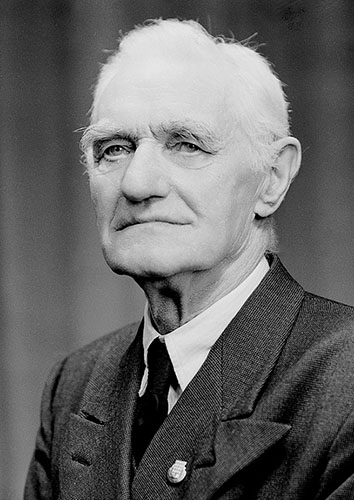
- Vangberg, 1950s
- Born: Johan Erik Vangberg; 21 February 1874; Vardø, Norway
- Died: 18 December 1956 (aged 82)
- Occupations: Carpenter, trade unionist, and politician

Johan Erik Vangberg (21 February 1874 – 18 December 1956) was a Norwegian carpenter, trade unionist and politician.

He was born in Vardø to Johan Ludvig Jansen Vangberg and Marie Mathilde Tandberg. He was elected representative to the Storting for the periods 1925–1927 and 1928–1930, for the Labour Party. He chaired the trade union Norsk trearbeiderforbund from 1923 to 1924, and was named honorary member of the Norwegian Union of Municipal Employees.
