= Johan Ludvig Johannesen =

Norwegian politician

- Born: 6 August 1879; Borge, Norway
- Died: 25 May 1953 (aged 73)
- Occupation: Politician
- Political party: Labour Party

Johan Ludvig Johannesen (6 August 1879 – 25 May 1953) was a Norwegian politician.

He was born in Borge to Johannes Jensen and Beate Larsen. He was elected representative to the Storting for the periods 1934–1936 and 1937–1945, for the Labour Party. He was a member of the municipal council of Fredrikstad from 1910 to 1919, and from 1925 to 1933.
