= Alfred Mathias Grønneberg =

Norwegian politician

- Born: 26 January 1879; Tjølling, Norway
- Died: 27 September 1963 (aged 84)
- Occupations: Watchmaker and politician
- Political party: Conservative Party

Alfred Mathias Grønneberg (26 January 1879 – 27 September 1963) was a Norwegian politician.

He was born in Tjølling Municipality to farmers Andreas Grønneberg and Inger Marie Valle, and settled as watchmaker in Fredrikstad from 1907. He was elected representative to the Storting for the period 1937–1945, for the Conservative Party. He was a member of the municipal council of Fredrikstad Municipality from 1922 to 1934. He chaired Norges Urmakerforbund from 1930 to 1941.
