= Jon Andrå =

Norwegian politician (1888–1966)

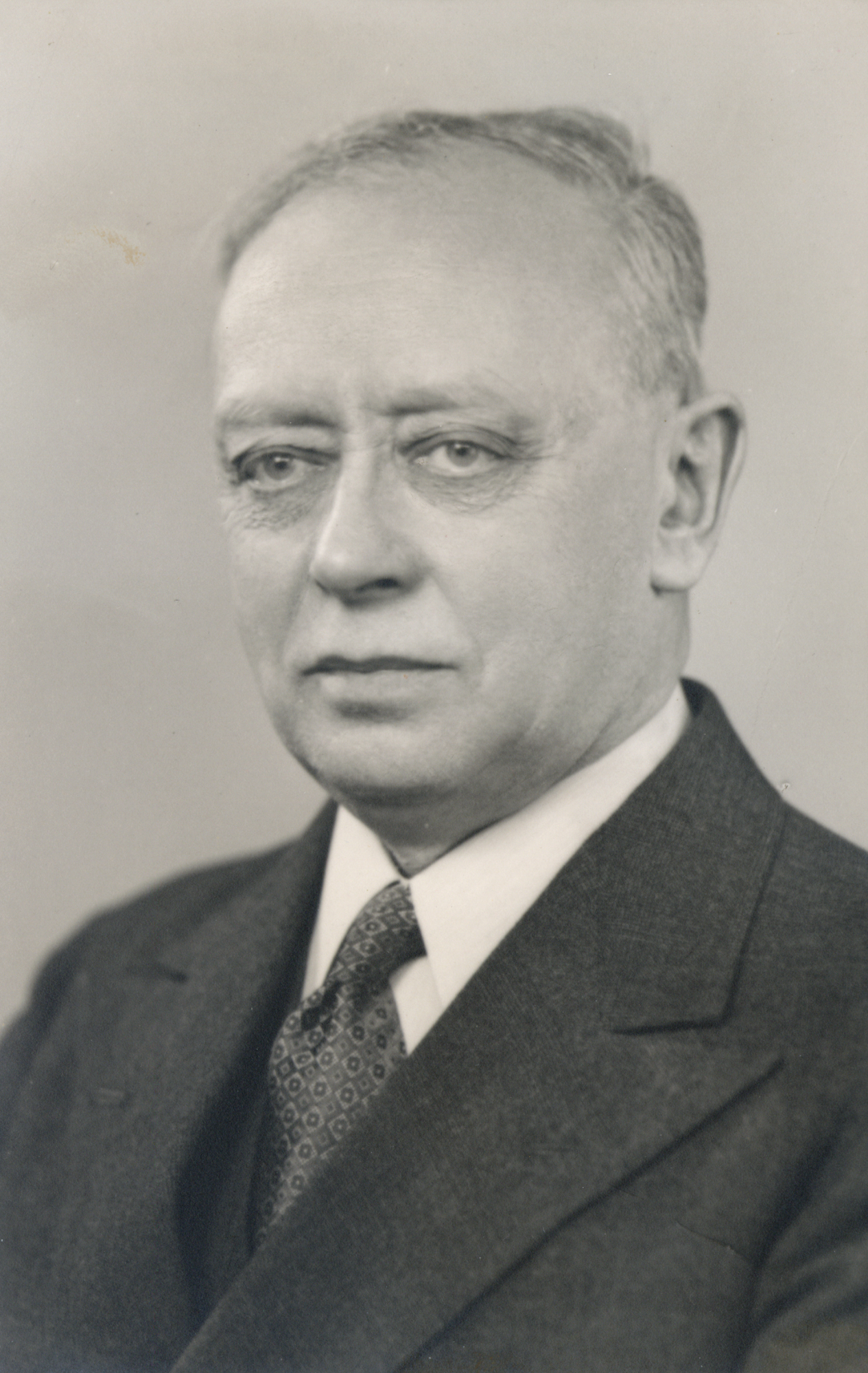
Image of Jon Andrå

Jon Andrå (12 January 1888 – 15 October 1966) was a Norwegian politician for the Labour Party.

He was born in the town of Drøbak.

He was elected to the Norwegian Parliament from the Market towns of Nordland, Troms and Finnmark in 1931, and was re-elected on three occasions. He had previously served in the position of deputy representative during the terms 1925–1927 and 1928–1930.

Andrå was a member of the executive committee of municipal council of Vardø Municipality during the term 1919–1922, and served as mayor there from 1925 to 1930.

Outside politics he started his career as a teacher in Tolga Municipality and later in Vardø Municipality. Here, he was the chief editor of Finnmarken from 1919 to 1920. He worked for the Office of the Auditor General of Norway from 1946 to 1950.
