= Otto Knoph Rømcke =

Norwegian politician

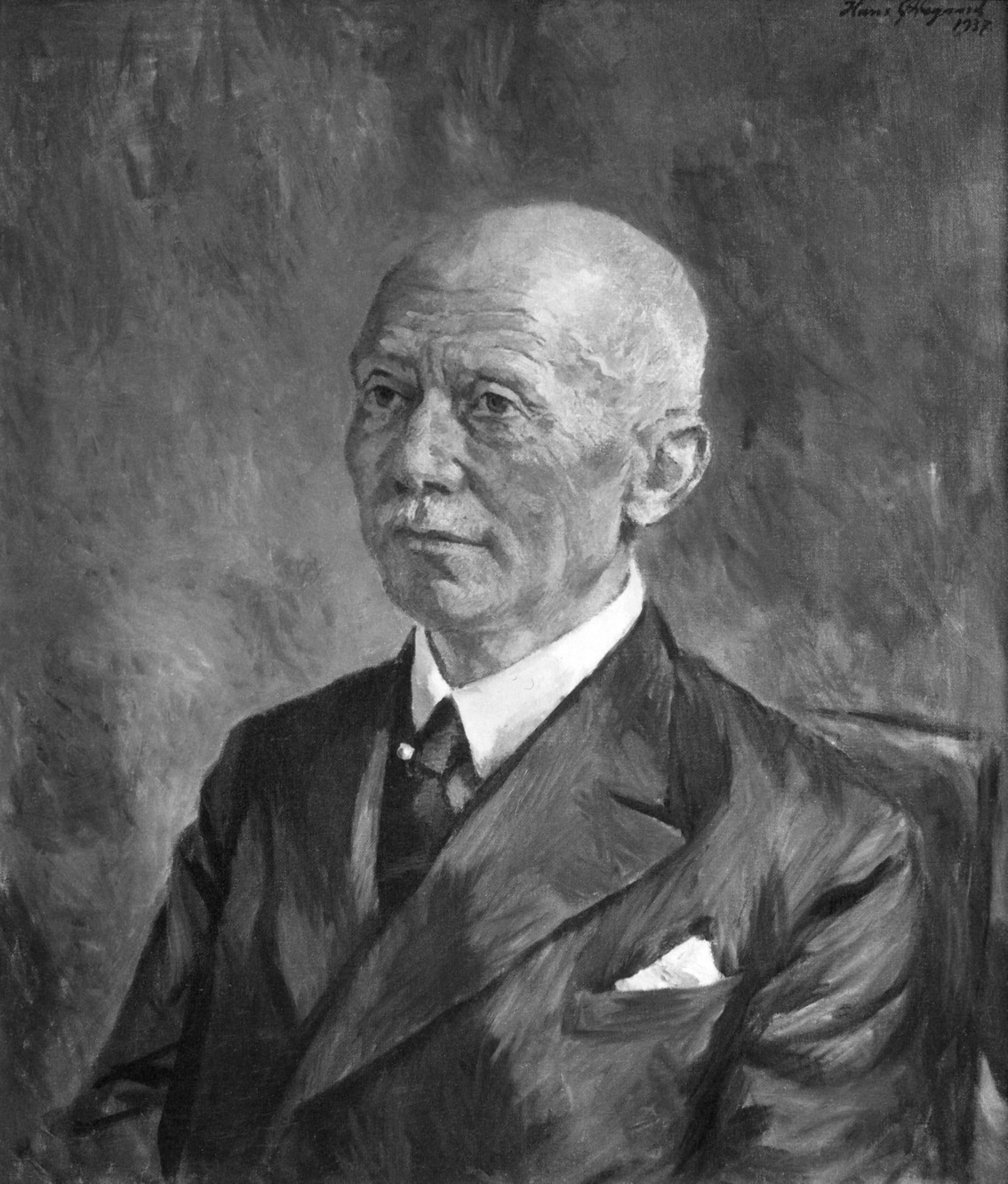
- Born: 14 November 1868; Nes, Norway
- Died: 7 April 1954 (aged 85)
- Occupations: Wholesaler; Politician

Otto Knoph Rømcke (14 November 1868 – 7 April 1954) was a Norwegian wholesaler and politician.

He was born in Nes to Olaf Gustav Rømcke and Agnes Marie Torgersen. He married Sigrid Andrea Hansen in 1898.

He was elected representative to the Storting for the periods 1919–1921 and 1922–1924, for the Conservative Party. He served as mayor of Drammen from 1913 to 1916, and from 1916 to 1918.
