= 1927 Conservative Party national convention =

Norwegian political party conference

Convention
- Date(s): 18 and 19 Juni 1927
- City: Oslo
- Venue: unknown

Elected leadership
- Party leader: C.J. Hambro

The 1927 national convention of the Conservative Party of Norway was held in Oslo. The convention re-elected Carl Joachim Hambro as party leader and discussed the construction of the Flåm Line.
