= Ole Johan Olsen =

Norwegian politician

- Born: 6 December 1884; Kristiansand, Norway
- Died: 31 May 1939 (aged 54)
- Occupation: politician

Ole Johan Olsen (6 December 1884 – 31 May 1939) was a Norwegian politician.

Olsen was born in Kristiansand to firefighter Anton Martin Olsen and Mathilde Fredrikke Pedersen. He was elected representative to the Stortinget for the periods 1928–1930, 1931–1933, 1934–1936 and 1937–1945, for the Labour Party.
