= Johan Alfred Svendsen =

Norwegian politician (1886–1954)

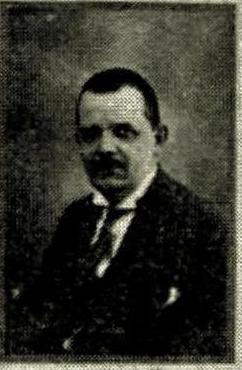
- Born: 4 September 1886; Arendal, Norway
- Occupation: Politician
- Political party: Conservative Party

Johan Alfred Svendsen (4 September 1886 – 1954) was a Norwegian politician.

He was born in Arendal to Gabriel Svendsen and Karen Sofie Røstad. He was elected representative to the Storting for the period 1931–1933 and 1934–1936, for the Conservative Party. He served as mayor of Lillehammer Municipality from 1922 to 1928.
