= Carl Magne Rønnevig =

Norwegian physician and politician

- Born: 30 October 1874; Haugesund, Norway
- Died: 1 March 1970 (aged 95)
- Occupations: Physician; Politician

Carl Magne Rønnevig (30 October 1874 – 1 March 1970) was a Norwegian physician and politician.

Rønnevig was born in Haugesund to ship owner Knud Hansen Rønnevig and Karen Margrethe Magnesen. He was elected representative to the Stortinget for the period 1931–1933, for the Liberal Party.
