= Knut Jacobsen (politician) =

Norwegian banker and politician

- Born: 11 November 1885; Haugesund, Norway
- Died: 22 February 1976 (aged 90)
- Occupations: Banker, politician

Knut Jacobsen (11 November 1885 – 22 February 1976) was a Norwegian banker and politician. Jacobsen was born in Haugesund to merchant Svend Jacobsen and Berta Karine Rossebø. He was elected representative to the Stortinget for the period 1934–1936, for the Conservative Party.
