= Andreas Kjær =

Norwegian civil servant and politician (1881–1983)

Andreas Kjær (31 March 1881 – 5 May 1983) was a Norwegian civil servant and politician.

Kjær was born in Holme Municipality to farmer Peder Kjær and Josefa Kolstad. He was appointed chief administrative officer (Norwegian: rådmann) in Kristiansand from 1923 to 1951, except for the period 1941–1945, during the German occupation of Norway. He was elected representative to the Stortinget for the periods 1931–1933 and 1937–1945, for the Conservative Party. He was decorated Knight, First Class of the Order of the Dannebrog. He was awarded the King's Medal of Merit in gold in 1951.
