= Olaf Fjalstad =

Norwegian jurist and politician

- Born: 2 April 1888; Bamble Municipality, Norway
- Died: 22 February 1971 (aged 82)
- Occupations: Jurist and politician

Olaf Fjalstad (2 April 1888 – 22 February 1971) was a Norwegian jurist and politician. He was born in Bamble Municipality; a son of priest John Fjalstad. He was a member of the Storting from 1928 to 1945. He served as stipendiary magistrate of Nedenes from 1937 to 1958. He was a brother-in-law of Fredrik Vogt.
