= Johan Edvind Pettersen =

Norwegian politician

- Born: 5 April 1887; Sarpsborg, Norway
- Died: 24 June 1964 (aged 77); Sarpsborg, Norway
- Occupation: Politician

Johan Edvind Pettersen (5 April 1887 – 24 June 1964) was a Norwegian politician.

He was born in Sarpsborg to Peter Johansen Sande and Karoline Olavesen. He was elected representative to the Storting for the periods 1931–1933, 1934–1936 and 1937–1945, for the Labour Party. He was a member of the municipal council of Sarpsborg from 1919 to 1940.
