= Karl Bolivar Olafsen =

Norwegian politician

- Born: 22 June 1880; Tune, Norway
- Died: 2 February 1927 (aged 46)
- Occupation: Politician

Karl Bolivar Olafsen (22 June 1880 – 2 February 1927) was a Norwegian politician.

He was born in Tune to Bernhard Brynhildsen and Karoline Elisabeth Olavesdatter. He was elected representative to the Storting for the periods 1922–1924 and 1925–1927, for the Social Democratic Labour Party. He served as mayor of Sarpsborg from 1919.
