= Børge Olsen-Hagen =

Norwegian journalist, newspaper editor and politician

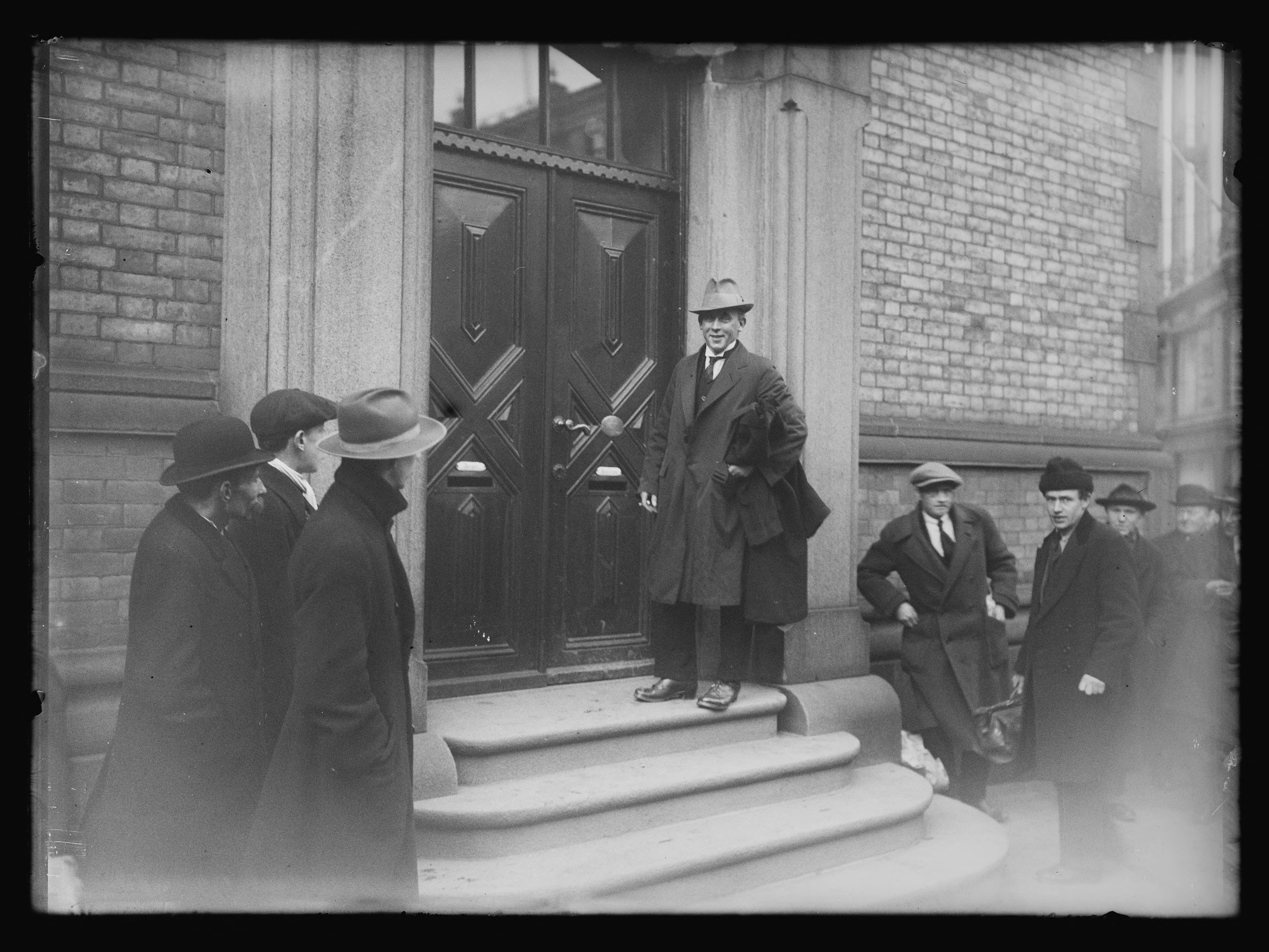
Børge Olsen-Hagen outside Stortinget

Børge Olsen-Hagen (10 February 1883 – 13 September 1936) was a Norwegian journalist, newspaper editor and politician.

He was born in Stavanger, and was editor of the newspaper 1ste Mai from 1920 to 1936. He was elected representative to the Stortinget for the periods 1925–1927, 1928–1930, 1931–1933 and 1934–1936, for the Labour Party.
