= Abraham Aakre =

Norwegian teacher and politician

- Born: 11 October 1874; Drangedal Municipality, Norway
- Died: 6 October 1948 (aged 73)
- Occupations: Teacher; Politician

Abraham Aakre (11 October 1874 – 6 October 1948) was a Norwegian teacher and politician.

He was born in Drangedal Municipality to farmers Gunder Gundersen Aakre and Karen Jensine Aakre. He was elected representative to the Storting for the period 1934–1936, for the Labour Party. He served as mayor of Halden Municipality from 1919 to 1920 and from 1925 to 1931.
