= Otto Thott Fritzner Müller =

Norwegian politician

- Born: 3 December 1864; Trondheim, Norway
- Died: 28 December 1944 (aged 80)
- Occupations: Schoolteacher; Politician

Otto Thott Fritzner Müller (3 December 1864 – 28 December 1944) was a Norwegian schoolteacher and politician. He was born in Trondheim to Carl Arnoldus Müller and Arnoldine von Westen Sylow Kjeldsberg. He was elected representative to the Storting for the periods 1919–1921 and 1922–1924, for the Conservative Party. He served as mayor of Halden 1913–16.
