= Harald Sigvard Bakke =

Norwegian politician

- Born: 30 June 1882; Halden, Norway
- Died: 11 February 1963 (aged 80)
- Occupations: Teacher; Politician

Harald Sigvard Bakke (30 June 1882 – 11 February 1963) was a Norwegian teacher and politician.

He was born in Halden to farmers Johan Edvard Bakke and Tilla Bolette Nordby. He graduated as cand.philol. in 1912, and lectured at various secondary schools, including Sandnes, Stavanger, Halden and Oslo. He was elected representative to the Storting for the periods 1925–1927, 1928–1930, 1931–1933 and 1934–1936, for the Conservative Party. He was a member of the municipal council of Halden from 1916 to 1934.
