= Julius Bastian Olsen =

Norwegian politician

- Born: 15 June 1875; Hammerfest, Norway
- Died: 26 July 1936 (aged 61)
- Occupations: Blacksmith; Works manager Politician

Julius Bastian Olsen (15 June 1875 – 26 July 1936) was a Norwegian blacksmith, works manager and politician.

He was born in Hammerfest to blacksmith Ole Bastian Olsen and Marie Julie Pæra. He was elected representative to the Storting for the periods 1928–1930, 1931–1933 and 1934–1936, for the Labour Party. He served as mayor of Narvik Municipality from 1913 to 1921, and from 1925 to 1927.
