= Olav Eysteinson Fjærli =

Norwegian politician

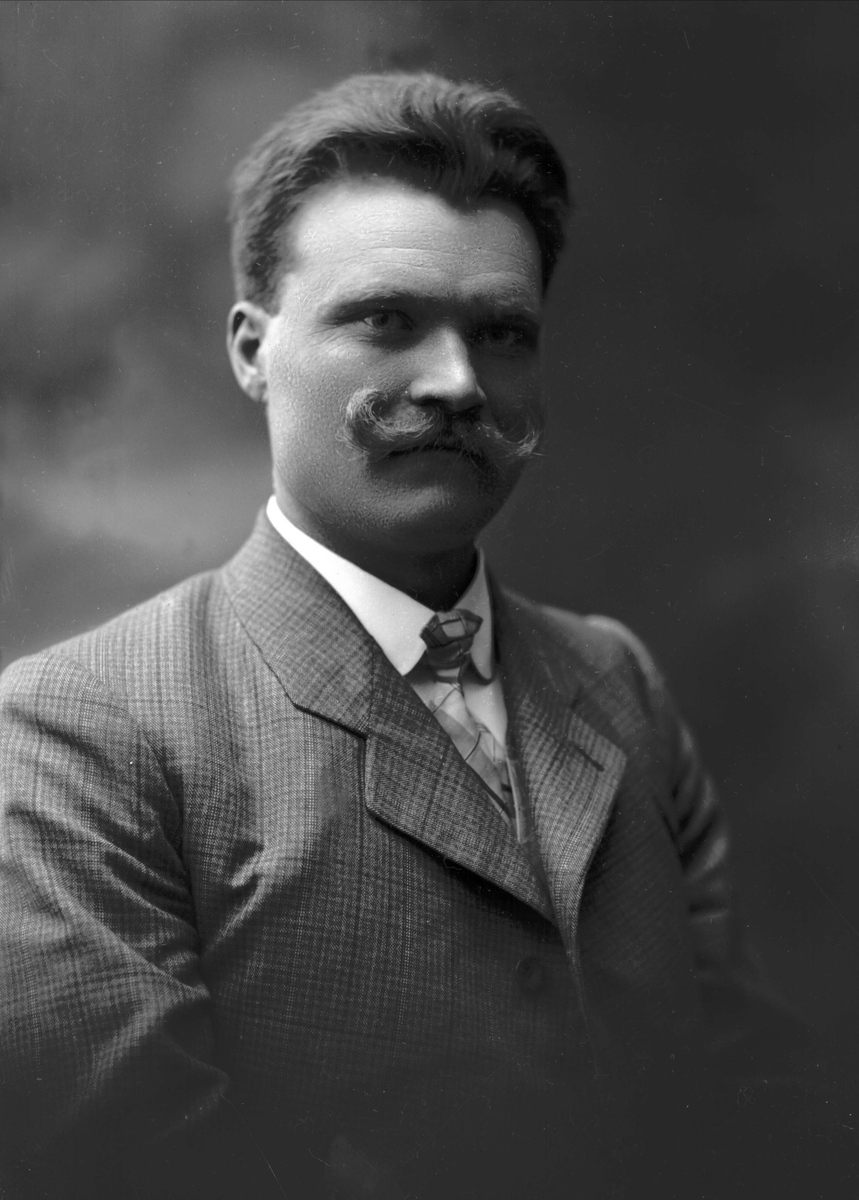
- Fjærli in 1920
- Born: 25 March 1883; Krognes, Valsøyfjord Municipality, Norway
- Died: 29 January 1947 (aged 63)
- Occupation: Politician

Olav Eysteinson Fjærli (March 25, 1883 – January 29, 1947) was a Norwegian politician for the Liberal Party, representing them in the Parliament of Norway from 1919 to 1933.

Fjærli was born in Krognes in the old Valsøyfjord Municipality in Romsdalen county, Norway. He was the son of the farmer and sergeant Esten Fjærli (1850–1900) and Marit Krognes (1853–1938). He was the father of the officer, writer, and politician Eystein Fjærli.

Fjærli graduated from the three-year program at the Norwegian College of Agriculture in 1910 and spent the next five years teaching agriculture. From 1916 to 1930 he was the county agricultural agent for Møre county. On January 10, 1931 he became the head of the State Smallholders Teachers School at Hvalstad in Asker Municipality. For many years, he was a consistent contributor to newspapers with articles on agriculture and politics.

From 1919 to 1933, Fjærli was a parliamentary representative for Møre. During his first three-year term he represented the single-member district of Romsdal and was assigned to economic committee no. 2. During his next three terms he was on the agricultural committee, and during his last term, from 1931 to 1933, he served as secretary of the forestry and water committee. He was a member of the Liberal Party during all of his terms in the Storting. In addition to his parliamentary duties, he was chairman of the Romsdal Agricultural Association (Romsdals Landmannslag) from 1919 to 1930, a member of the Romsdal Marketing and Purchasing Association (Romsdals Salgs- og kjøpelag) from 1919 to 1924, and chairman of the Agricultural Officers Association (Landbruksfunksjonærenes Landsforbund) from 1922 onward.

He was buried in Molde.
