= Lauritz Kristian Nilssen Rygh =

Norwegian journalist, newspaper editor and politician

Lauritz Kristian Nilssen Rygh (14 July 1874 – 1950) was a Norwegian journalist, newspaper editor and politician.

He was born in Stavanger to shoemaker Ole Nilssen Rygh and Anne Severine Larsdatter. He was editor of the newspaper Stavanger Aftenblad from 1921 to 1927. He was elected representative to the Stortinget for the periods 1931–1933, 1934–1936, and 1937–1945, for the Liberal Party. He died in 1950.
