= Olaf Løhre =

Norwegian politician (1877–1957)

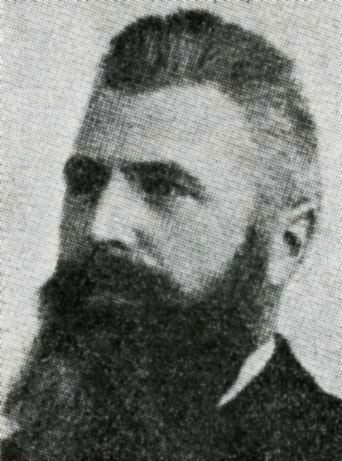
- Løhre, c.1930
- Born: 31 December 1877; Strinda Municipality, Norway
- Died: 5 May 1957 (aged 79)
- Occupation: Politician
- Relatives: Ole Ingebrigtsen Soelberg (great-grandfather)

Olaf Bertram Løhre (31 December 1877 – 5 May 1957) was a Norwegian politician.

He was born in Strinda Municipality to farmer and teacher Johan Peter Eriksen Løhre and Karen Nicoline Nilsdatter. He was elected representative to the Storting for the period 1922–1924, for the Labour Party, and the period 1928–1930, for the Communist Party.
