= Tørris Heggelund =

Norwegian jurist and politician

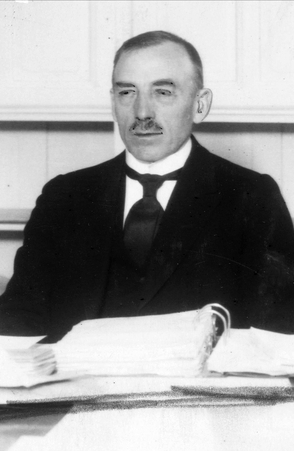
Tørris Heggelund, c. 1935

Tørris Heggelund (9 October 1872 – 1 May 1940) was a Norwegian jurist and politician.

Heggelund was born in Etne Municipality and later settled in the city of Kristiansand. He was elected representative to the Stortinget for the periods 1919–1921, 1922–1924, 1925–1927 and 1928–1930, for the Conservative Party.
