= Sverre Støstad =

Norwegian politician

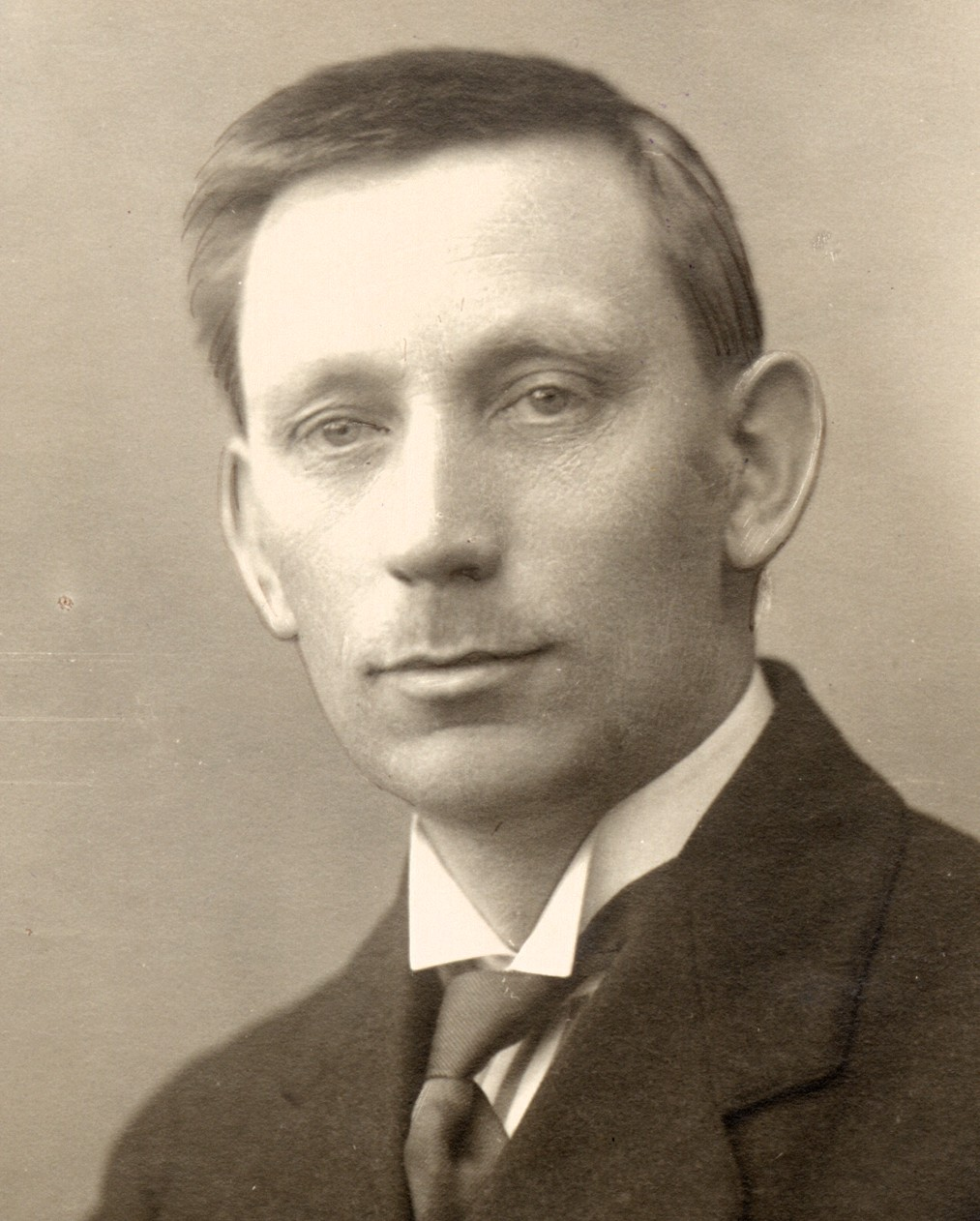
Norwegian minister Sverre Stostad

Sverre Kornelius Eilertsen Støstad (13 May 1887 – 7 December 1959) was the Norwegian Minister of Social Affairs 1939–1945, and member of the government delegation in Oslo in 1945, as well as head of the Ministry of Supplies and Reconstruction.
