= Østfold (Storting constituency) =

Constituency of the Storting, the national legislature of Norway

- Constituency for the Storting
- Location of Østfold within Norway
- County: Østfold
- Population: 314,568 (2025)
- Electorate: 234,860 (2025)
- Area: 4,004 km^{2} (2025)

Current constituency
- Created: 1921
- Seats: List: 8 (1953–present); 6 (1921–1953)
- Members of the Storting: List: Hashim Abdi (Ap); Ronny Aukrust (Ap); Bjørnar Laabak (FrP); Julia Brännström Nordtug (FrP); Tage Pettersen (H); Remi Sølvberg (R); Solveig Vitanza (Ap); Elise Waagen (Ap); Erlend Wiborg (FrP)
- Created from: List: Eidsberg; Glemminge; Idde and Marker; Rygge; Tune

Østfold is one of the 19 multi-member constituencies of the Storting, the national legislature of Norway. The constituency was established in 1921 following the introduction of proportional representation for elections to the Storting. It is conterminous with the county of Østfold. The constituency currently elects eight of the 169 members of the Storting using the open party-list proportional representation electoral system. At the 2025 parliamentary election it had 234,860 registered electors.

== Electoral system ==
Østfold currently elects eight of the 169 members of the Storting using the open (Note: Although technically elections to the Storting have open lists, they are in effect closed lists as a majority of those voting for a party must make changes to the lists for the changes to take effect, which has never happened since the introduction of proportional representation in 1921, and as result candidates are elected in the order submitted by the party.) party-list proportional representation electoral system. Constituency seats are allocated by the County Electoral Committee using the Modified Sainte-Laguë method. Compensatory seats (seats at large or levelling seats) are calculated based on the national vote and are allocated by the National Electoral Committee using the Modified Sainte-Laguë method at the constituency level (one for each constituency). Only parties that reach the 4% national threshold compete for compensatory seats.

== Election results ==
=== Summary ===
Election	Communists K			Reds R / RV / FMS			Socialist Left SV / SF			Labour Ap			Greens MDG			Centre Sp / Bp / L			Liberals V			Christian Democrats KrF			Conservatives H			Progress FrP / ALP		
Election	Votes	%	Seats	Votes	%	Seats	Votes	%	Seats	Votes	%	Seats	Votes	%	Seats	Votes	%	Seats	Votes	%	Seats	Votes	%	Seats	Votes	%	Seats	Votes	%	Seats
2025				9,236	5.20%	0	7,717	4.34%	0	52,961	29.80%	4	6,116	3.44%	0	8,570	4.82%	0	4,437	2.50%	0	6,858	3.86%	0	22,291	12.54%	1	51,055	28.73%	3
2021				7,418	4.58%	0	9,840	6.08%	0	49,345	30.48%	3	4,782	2.95%	0	22,849	14.11%	2	4,771	2.95%	0	5,414	3.34%	0	30,211	18.66%	2	20,527	12.68%	1
2017				3,435	2.14%	0	7,036	4.38%	0	51,545	32.05%	3	4,192	2.61%	0	13,943	8.67%	1	3,878	2.41%	0	6,811	4.24%	0	38,264	23.79%	2	28,181	17.52%	2
2013				1,149	0.73%	0	3,668	2.33%	0	54,910	34.92%	3	3,168	2.01%	0	6,405	4.07%	0	5,723	3.64%	0	8,828	5.61%	0	39,703	25.25%	3	30,801	19.59%	2
2009				1,041	0.70%	0	6,501	4.36%	0	58,613	39.34%	4	374	0.25%	0	7,250	4.87%	0	3,739	2.51%	0	8,589	5.76%	0	22,041	14.79%	1	38,853	26.08%	3
2005	107	0.07%	0	962	0.65%	0	10,721	7.23%	1	52,984	35.74%	3	180	0.12%	0	7,236	4.88%	0	5,943	4.01%	0	10,205	6.88%	0	17,697	11.94%	1	39,816	26.86%	3
2001	99	0.07%	0	776	0.55%	0	16,023	11.39%	1	39,191	27.85%	2				6,689	4.75%	0	3,501	2.49%	0	17,790	12.64%	1	27,514	19.55%	2	24,086	17.12%	2
1997	149	0.10%	0	2,227	1.55%	0	6,649	4.62%	0	57,713	40.09%	4	263	0.18%	0	10,013	6.96%	0	4,526	3.14%	0	19,218	13.35%	1	17,806	12.37%	1	22,841	15.87%	2
1993				741	0.54%	0	9,212	6.74%	0	57,962	42.43%	4	266	0.19%	0	19,435	14.23%	1	3,741	2.74%	0	11,739	8.59%	1	18,792	13.76%	1	10,067	7.37%	1
1989				757	0.50%	0	14,891	9.75%	1	60,902	39.89%	3	796	0.52%	0	9,116	5.97%	0	2,739	1.79%	0	12,789	8.38%	1	29,276	19.18%	2	20,661	13.53%	1
1985	217	0.14%	0	497	0.33%	0	5,562	3.66%	0	74,283	48.92%	4				9,240	6.09%	0	2,665	1.76%	0	13,351	8.79%	1	40,399	26.61%	3	4,440	2.92%	0
1981	428	0.29%	0	652	0.44%	0	4,798	3.27%	0	66,461	45.27%	4				9,869	6.72%	0	3,564	2.43%	0	13,300	9.06%	1	41,782	28.46%	3	5,414	3.69%	0
1977	481	0.35%	0	458	0.33%	0	4,222	3.08%	0	70,423	51.43%	5				10,663	7.79%	0	2,245	1.64%	0	16,084	11.75%	1	29,441	21.50%	2	1,792	1.31%	0
1973				417	0.32%	0	13,625	10.55%	1	55,670	43.12%	4				11,145	8.63%	1	1,750	1.36%	0	17,159	13.29%	1	22,265	17.24%	1	4,832	3.74%	0
1969	1,136	0.87%	0				4,381	3.34%	0	71,102	54.15%	5				13,264	10.10%	1	5,297	4.03%	0	13,566	10.33%	1	22,551	17.18%	1			
1965	1,380	1.13%	0				8,051	6.57%	0	63,041	51.41%	4				14,713	12.00%	1				11,109	9.06%	1	24,330	19.84%	2			
1961	3,532	3.12%	0							62,845	55.54%	4				12,507	11.05%	1				12,630	11.16%	1	21,645	19.13%	2			
1957	2,982	2.73%	0							60,249	55.10%	5				9,065	8.29%	0	3,407	3.12%	0	12,935	11.83%	1	19,768	18.08%	2			
1953	4,465	4.16%	0							58,120	54.20%	5				9,139	8.52%	1	3,810	3.55%	0	13,476	12.57%	1	18,229	17.00%	1			
1949	2,781	3.92%	0							36,602	51.63%	3										10,299	14.53%	1	20,894	29.47%	2			
1945	5,756	9.59%	0							25,283	42.12%	3				6,794	11.32%	1	1,990	3.32%	0	13,043	21.73%	1	7,162	11.93%	1			
1936										29,840	49.04%	3				11,354	18.66%	1	5,728	9.41%	0				12,370	20.33%	2			
1933	273	0.52%	0							24,744	47.26%	3				11,658	22.26%	2	5,632	10.76%	0				9,339	17.84%	1			
1930	136	0.28%	0							17,937	36.66%	3				14,000	28.61%	2	5,278	10.79%	0				11,576	23.66%	1			
1927										18,752	45.34%	3				11,226	27.15%	2	3,043	7.36%	0				8,334	20.15%	1			
1924	387	1.01%	0							3,048	7.97%	0				10,708	28.00%	2	3,092	8.09%	0				9,806	25.64%	2			
1921										3,251	9.77%	0				7,030	21.14%	1	3,773	11.34%	1				10,012	30.10%	2			

(Excludes compensatory seats. Figures in italics represent joint lists.)

=== Detailed ===
==== 2020s ====
===== 2025 =====
Results of the 2025 parliamentary election held on 8 September 2025:

Party		Votes per municipality												Total votes	%	Seats		
Party		Are- mark	Fredrik- stad	Halden	Hvaler	Indre Østfold	Marker	Moss	Råde	Rakke- stad	Sarps- borg	Skip- tvet	Våler	Total votes	%	Con.	Com.	Tot.
Labour Party	Ap	191	15,789	5,692	1,002	6,495	656	9,376	1,118	1,225	10,198	506	713	52,961	29.80%	4	0	4
Progress Party	FrP	179	13,816	4,979	925	7,981	492	7,478	1,407	1,417	10,418	817	1,146	51,055	28.73%	3	0	3
Conservative Party	H	58	6,359	2,049	474	3,210	173	4,750	612	443	3,583	191	389	22,291	12.54%	1	0	1
Red Party	R	42	2,665	1,064	158	1,181	93	1,896	160	177	1,561	91	148	9,236	5.20%	0	1	1
Centre Party	Sp	234	1,231	818	139	2,172	369	652	359	779	1,160	294	363	8,570	4.82%	0	0	0
Socialist Left Party	SV	18	2,543	682	110	1,026	46	1,597	155	112	1,268	64	96	7,717	4.34%	0	0	0
Christian Democratic Party	KrF	81	1,780	783	94	1,067	188	701	317	332	1,242	130	143	6,858	3.86%	0	0	0
Green Party	MDG	16	1,960	747	126	685	48	1,398	141	74	785	54	82	6,116	3.44%	0	0	0
Liberal Party	V	7	1,327	400	126	585	48	1,089	86	56	615	29	69	4,437	2.50%	0	0	0
Pensioners' Party	PP	8	764	375	31	275	14	390	52	34	432	21	27	2,423	1.36%	0	0	0
Norway Democrats	ND	8	419	160	22	287	31	233	45	55	405	32	30	1,727	0.97%	0	0	0
Generation Party	GP	8	298	103	13	215	18	218	34	33	203	23	32	1,198	0.67%	0	0	0
Industry and Business Party	INP	11	284	262	12	133	7	130	35	31	156	22	21	1,104	0.62%	0	0	0
Conservative	K	6	171	112	15	116	23	90	40	41	166	9	12	801	0.45%	0	0	0
Peace and Justice	FOR	4	145	34	12	85	6	94	4	17	104	9	11	525	0.30%	0	0	0
Center Party	PS	2	52	19	1	47	2	66	7	7	25	4	6	238	0.13%	0	0	0
DNI Party	DNI	1	75	17	5	34	3	35	4	20	38	0	4	236	0.13%	0	0	0
Welfare and Innovation Party	VIP	1	64	27	3	47	6	30	8	9	37	1	3	236	0.13%	0	0	0
Valid votes		875	49,742	18,323	3,268	25,641	2,223	30,223	4,584	4,862	32,396	2,297	3,295	177,729	100.00%	8	1	9
Blank votes		6	539	258	23	323	36	287	52	56	359	22	40	2,001	1.11%			
Rejected votes – other		0	19	64	11	60	1	69	16	3	96	5	2	346	0.19%			
Total polled		881	50,300	18,645	3,302	26,024	2,260	30,579	4,652	4,921	32,851	2,324	3,337	180,076	76.67%			
Registered electors		1,069	65,385	24,668	3,894	34,295	2,872	39,034	5,707	6,399	44,428	2,920	4,189	234,860				
Turnout		82.41%	76.93%	75.58%	84.80%	75.88%	78.69%	78.34%	81.51%	76.90%	73.94%	79.59%	79.66%	76.67%				

The following candidates were elected:

- Constituency seats - Hashim Abdi (Ap); Bjørnar Laabak (FrP); Julia Brännström Nordtug (FrP); Jon-Ivar Nygård (Ap); Tage Pettersen (H); Solveig Vitanza (Ap); Elise Waagen (Ap); and Erlend Wiborg (FrP).
- Compensatory seat - Remi Sølvberg (R).

===== 2021 =====
Results of the 2021 parliamentary election held on 13 September 2021:

Party		Votes per municipality												Total votes	%	Seats		
Party		Are- mark	Fredrik- stad	Halden	Hvaler	Indre Østfold	Marker	Moss	Råde	Rakke- stad	Sarps- borg	Skip- tvet	Våler	Total votes	%	Con.	Com.	Tot.
Labour Party	Ap	159	14,892	5,299	862	5,731	623	8,326	962	945	10,451	469	626	49,345	30.48%	3	0	3
Conservative Party	H	88	8,374	2,843	705	4,454	261	6,329	936	554	4,840	269	558	30,211	18.66%	2	0	2
Centre Party	Sp	396	4,035	2,446	356	5,004	717	2,321	834	1,677	3,679	638	746	22,849	14.11%	2	0	2
Progress Party	FrP	73	5,728	1,915	446	3,132	191	3,017	566	540	4,184	295	440	20,527	12.68%	1	0	1
Socialist Left Party	SV	24	3,175	1,002	183	1,164	61	2,166	167	119	1,558	78	143	9,840	6.08%	0	1	1
Red Party	R	26	2,362	925	158	831	56	1,471	126	114	1,170	70	109	7,418	4.58%	0	0	0
Christian Democratic Party	KrF	63	1,403	623	60	840	133	525	277	257	1,032	92	109	5,414	3.34%	0	0	0
Green Party	MDG	8	1,598	598	96	510	26	1,040	94	66	642	34	70	4,782	2.95%	0	0	0
Liberal Party	V	12	1,449	458	85	650	48	1,201	99	45	600	36	88	4,771	2.95%	0	0	0
Democrats in Norway		8	522	252	42	453	26	329	45	61	486	60	64	2,348	1.45%	0	0	0
Pensioners' Party	PP	4	673	292	28	171	14	249	45	13	357	13	10	1,869	1.15%	0	0	0
The Christians	PDK	5	146	108	11	91	11	63	24	35	178	10	6	688	0.42%	0	0	0
Health Party		3	104	29	8	84	4	69	9	12	59	2	10	393	0.24%	0	0	0
Center Party		1	71	19	2	80	3	62	12	20	58	5	3	336	0.21%	0	0	0
People's Action No to More Road Tolls	FNB	0	100	17	3	36	0	38	6	5	72	3	5	285	0.18%	0	0	0
Capitalist Party		1	67	40	1	26	6	46	4	6	61	1	4	263	0.16%	0	0	0
Industry and Business Party	INP	0	67	21	7	31	1	38	9	10	34	5	7	230	0.14%	0	0	0
Alliance - Alternative for Norway		0	52	17	2	18	0	32	6	10	28	3	4	172	0.11%	0	0	0
Pirate Party of Norway		0	50	17	3	22	1	23	4	0	31	2	2	155	0.10%	0	0	0
Valid votes		871	44,868	16,921	3,058	23,328	2,182	27,345	4,225	4,489	29,520	2,085	3,004	161,896	100.00%	8	1	9
Blank votes		4	399	154	12	213	21	241	36	36	300	12	23	1,451	0.89%			
Rejected votes – other		0	56	47	4	28	12	15	12	2	31	0	0	207	0.13%			
Total polled		875	45,323	17,122	3,074	23,569	2,215	27,601	4,273	4,527	29,851	2,097	3,027	163,554	73.03%			
Registered electors		1,065	62,284	23,813	3,857	32,679	2,851	36,679	5,480	6,106	42,411	2,786	3,934	223,945				
Turnout		82.16%	72.77%	71.90%	79.70%	72.12%	77.69%	75.25%	77.97%	74.14%	70.39%	75.27%	76.94%	73.03%				

The following candidates were elected:

- Constituency seats - Elise Bjørnebekk-Waagen (Ap); Kjerstin Wøyen Funderud (Sp); Stein Erik Lauvås (Ap); Ole André Myhrvold (Sp); Jon-Ivar Nygård (Ap); Tage Pettersen (H); Ingjerd Schou (H); and Erlend Wiborg (FrP).
- Compensatory seat - Freddy André Øvstegård (SV).

==== 2010s ====
===== 2017 =====
Results of the 2017 parliamentary election held on 11 September 2017:

Party		Votes	%	Seats		
Party		Votes	%	Con.	Com.	Tot.
Labour Party	Ap	51,545	32.05%	3	0	3
Conservative Party	H	38,264	23.79%	2	0	2
Progress Party	FrP	28,181	17.52%	2	0	2
Centre Party	Sp	13,943	8.67%	1	0	1
Socialist Left Party	SV	7,036	4.38%	0	1	1
Christian Democratic Party	KrF	6,811	4.24%	0	0	0
Green Party	MDG	4,192	2.61%	0	0	0
Liberal Party	V	3,878	2.41%	0	0	0
Red Party	R	3,435	2.14%	0	0	0
Pensioners' Party	PP	1,359	0.85%	0	0	0
Health Party		806	0.50%	0	0	0
The Christians	PDK	518	0.32%	0	0	0
Capitalist Party		353	0.22%	0	0	0
The Alliance		211	0.13%	0	0	0
Democrats in Norway		190	0.12%	0	0	0
Coastal Party	KP	98	0.06%	0	0	0
Valid votes		160,820	100.00%	8	1	9
Blank votes		1,502	0.92%			
Rejected votes – other		392	0.24%			
Total polled		162,714	75.23%			
Registered electors		216,293				

The following candidates were elected:

- Constituency seats - Elise Bjørnebekk-Waagen (Ap); Svein Roald Hansen (Ap); Stein Erik Lauvås (Ap); Ulf Leirstein (FrP); Ole André Myhrvold (Sp); Tage Pettersen (H); Ingjerd Schou (H); and Erlend Wiborg (FrP).
- Compensatory seat - Freddy André Øvstegård (SV).

===== 2013 =====
Results of the 2013 parliamentary election held on 8 and 9 September 2013:

Party		Votes	%	Seats		
Party		Votes	%	Con.	Com.	Tot.
Labour Party	Ap	54,910	34.92%	3	0	3
Conservative Party	H	39,703	25.25%	3	0	3
Progress Party	FrP	30,801	19.59%	2	0	2
Christian Democratic Party	KrF	8,828	5.61%	0	1	1
Centre Party	Sp	6,405	4.07%	0	0	0
Liberal Party	V	5,723	3.64%	0	0	0
Socialist Left Party	SV	3,668	2.33%	0	0	0
Green Party	MDG	3,168	2.01%	0	0	0
Red Party	R	1,149	0.73%	0	0	0
The Christians	PDK	1,123	0.71%	0	0	0
Pensioners' Party	PP	956	0.61%	0	0	0
Pirate Party of Norway		516	0.33%	0	0	0
Christian Unity Party	KSP	145	0.09%	0	0	0
Democrats in Norway		99	0.06%	0	0	0
Coastal Party	KP	68	0.04%	0	0	0
Valid votes		157,262	100.00%	8	1	9
Blank votes		895	0.57%			
Rejected votes – other		213	0.13%			
Total polled		158,370	75.76%			
Registered electors		209,038				

The following candidates were elected:

- Constituency seats - Svein Roald Hansen (Ap); Irene Johansen (Ap); Stein Erik Lauvås (Ap); Ulf Leirstein (FrP); Eirik Milde (H); Ingjerd Schou (H); Bengt Morten Wenstøb (H); and Erlend Wiborg (FrP).
- Compensatory seat - Line Henriette Holten Hjemdal (KrF).

==== 2000s ====
===== 2009 =====
Results of the 2009 parliamentary election held on 13 and 14 September 2009:

Party		Votes	%	Seats		
Party		Votes	%	Con.	Com.	Tot.
Labour Party	Ap	58,613	39.34%	4	0	4
Progress Party	FrP	38,853	26.08%	3	0	3
Conservative Party	H	22,041	14.79%	1	0	1
Christian Democratic Party	KrF	8,589	5.76%	0	1	1
Centre Party	Sp	7,250	4.87%	0	0	0
Socialist Left Party	SV	6,501	4.36%	0	0	0
Liberal Party	V	3,739	2.51%	0	0	0
Pensioners' Party	PP	1,320	0.89%	0	0	0
Red Party	R	1,041	0.70%	0	0	0
Green Party	MDG	374	0.25%	0	0	0
Christian Unity Party	KSP	250	0.17%	0	0	0
Abortion Opponents' List		178	0.12%	0	0	0
Coastal Party	KP	129	0.09%	0	0	0
Democrats in Norway		110	0.07%	0	0	0
Valid votes		148,988	100.00%	8	1	9
Blank votes		845	0.56%			
Rejected votes – other		110	0.07%			
Total polled		149,943	74.23%			
Registered electors		201,989				

The following candidates were elected:

- Constituency seats - Thor Erik Forsberg (Ap); Jon Jæger Gåsvatn (FrP); Vigdis Giltun (FrP); Svein Roald Hansen (Ap); Irene Johansen (Ap); Ulf Leirstein (FrP); Wenche Olsen (Ap); and Ingjerd Schou (H).
- Compensatory seat - Line Henriette Holten Hjemdal (KrF).

===== 2005 =====
Results of the 2005 parliamentary election held on 11 and 12 September 2005:

Party		Votes	%	Seats		
Party		Votes	%	Con.	Com.	Tot.
Labour Party	Ap	52,984	35.74%	3	0	3
Progress Party	FrP	39,816	26.86%	3	0	3
Conservative Party	H	17,697	11.94%	1	0	1
Socialist Left Party	SV	10,721	7.23%	1	0	1
Christian Democratic Party	KrF	10,205	6.88%	0	1	1
Centre Party	Sp	7,236	4.88%	0	0	0
Liberal Party	V	5,943	4.01%	0	0	0
Pensioners' Party	PP	1,350	0.91%	0	0	0
Red Electoral Alliance	RV	962	0.65%	0	0	0
Coastal Party	KP	394	0.27%	0	0	0
Abortion Opponents' List		242	0.16%	0	0	0
Christian Unity Party	KSP	229	0.15%	0	0	0
Green Party	MDG	180	0.12%	0	0	0
Democrats		127	0.09%	0	0	0
Communist Party of Norway	K	107	0.07%	0	0	0
Reform Party		50	0.03%	0	0	0
Valid votes		148,243	100.00%	8	1	9
Blank votes		772	0.52%			
Rejected votes – other		114	0.08%			
Total polled		149,129	76.29%			
Registered electors		195,472				

The following candidates were elected:

- Constituency seats - Martin Engeset (H); Jon Jæger Gåsvatn (FrP); Vigdis Giltun (FrP); May Hansen (SV); Svein Roald Hansen (Ap); Irene Johansen (Ap); Ulf Leirstein (FrP); and Signe Øye (Ap).
- Compensatory seat - Line Henriette Holten Hjemdal (KrF).

===== 2001 =====
Results of the 2001 parliamentary election held on 9 and 10 September 2001:

Party		Votes	%	Seats		
Party		Votes	%	Con.	Com.	Tot.
Labour Party	Ap	39,191	27.85%	2	0	2
Conservative Party	H	27,514	19.55%	2	0	2
Progress Party	FrP	24,086	17.12%	2	0	2
Christian Democratic Party	KrF	17,790	12.64%	1	0	1
Socialist Left Party	SV	16,023	11.39%	1	0	1
Centre Party	Sp	6,689	4.75%	0	0	0
Liberal Party	V	3,501	2.49%	0	0	0
Pensioners' Party	PP	1,971	1.40%	0	0	0
The Political Party	DPP	1,292	0.92%	0	0	0
Coastal Party	KP	822	0.58%	0	0	0
Red Electoral Alliance	RV	776	0.55%	0	0	0
Christian Unity Party	KSP	397	0.28%	0	0	0
County Lists		179	0.13%	0	0	0
Fatherland Party	FLP	166	0.12%	0	0	0
Non-Partisan Coastal and Rural District Party		136	0.10%	0	0	0
Communist Party of Norway	K	99	0.07%	0	0	0
Norwegian People's Party	NFP	97	0.07%	0	0	0
Valid votes		140,729	100.00%	8	0	8
Rejected votes		1,040	0.73%			
Total polled		141,769	74.04%			
Registered electors		191,485				

The following candidates were elected:

- Constituency seats - Martin Engeset (H); May Hansen (SV); Svein Roald Hansen (Ap); Øystein Hedstrøm (FrP); Odd Holten (KrF); Signe Øye (Ap); Henrik Rød (FrP); and Ingjerd Schou (H).

==== 1990s ====
===== 1997 =====
Results of the 1997 parliamentary election held on 15 September 1997:

Party		Votes	%	Seats		
Party		Votes	%	Con.	Com.	Tot.
Labour Party	Ap	57,713	40.09%	4	0	4
Progress Party	FrP	22,841	15.87%	2	0	2
Christian Democratic Party	KrF	19,218	13.35%	1	0	1
Conservative Party	H	17,806	12.37%	1	0	1
Centre Party	Sp	10,013	6.96%	0	0	0
Socialist Left Party	SV	6,649	4.62%	0	0	0
Liberal Party	V	4,526	3.14%	0	0	0
Red Electoral Alliance	RV	2,227	1.55%	0	0	0
Pensioners' Party	PP	1,881	1.31%	0	0	0
New Future Coalition Party	SNF	346	0.24%	0	0	0
Green Party	MDG	263	0.18%	0	0	0
Fatherland Party	FLP	218	0.15%	0	0	0
Communist Party of Norway	K	149	0.10%	0	0	0
Natural Law Party		117	0.08%	0	0	0
Valid votes		143,967	100.00%	8	0	8
Rejected votes		671	0.46%			
Total polled		144,638	77.34%			
Registered electors		187,025				

The following candidates were elected:

- Constituency seats - Øystein Hedstrøm (FrP); Odd Holten (KrF); Kjellaug Nakkim (H); Signe Øye (Ap); Gunnar Skaug (Ap); Jørn L. Stang (FrP); Tom Thoresen (Ap); and Ane Sofie Tømmerås (Ap).

===== 1993 =====
Results of the 1993 parliamentary election held on 12 and 13 September 1993:

Party		Votes	%	Seats		
Party		Votes	%	Con.	Com.	Tot.
Labour Party	Ap	57,962	42.43%	4	0	4
Centre Party	Sp	19,435	14.23%	1	0	1
Conservative Party	H	18,792	13.76%	1	0	1
Christian Democratic Party	KrF	11,739	8.59%	1	0	1
Progress Party	FrP	10,067	7.37%	1	0	1
Socialist Left Party	SV	9,212	6.74%	0	0	0
Liberal Party	V	3,741	2.74%	0	0	0
Pensioners' Party	PP	3,104	2.27%	0	0	0
New Future Coalition Party	SNF	822	0.60%	0	0	0
Red Electoral Alliance	RV	741	0.54%	0	0	0
Stop Immigration	SI	380	0.28%	0	0	0
Fatherland Party	FLP	309	0.23%	0	0	0
Green Party	MDG	266	0.19%	0	0	0
Liberal People's Party	DLF	40	0.03%	0	0	0
Valid votes		136,610	100.00%	8	0	8
Rejected votes		1,209	0.88%			
Total polled		137,819	74.30%			
Registered electors		185,495				

The following candidates were elected:

- Constituency seats - Edvard Grimstad (Sp); Øystein Hedstrøm (FrP); Odd Holten (KrF); Kjellaug Nakkim (H); Signe Øye (Ap); Gunnar Skaug (Ap); Tom Thoresen (Ap); and Ane Sofie Tømmerås (Ap).

==== 1980s ====
===== 1989 =====
Results of the 1989 parliamentary election held on 10 and 11 September 1989:

Party		Votes	%	Seats		
Party		Votes	%	Con.	Com.	Tot.
Labour Party	Ap	60,902	39.89%	3	0	3
Conservative Party	H	29,276	19.18%	2	0	2
Progress Party	FrP	20,661	13.53%	1	0	1
Socialist Left Party	SV	14,891	9.75%	1	0	1
Christian Democratic Party	KrF	12,789	8.38%	1	0	1
Centre Party	Sp	9,116	5.97%	0	1	1
Liberal Party	V	2,739	1.79%	0	0	0
Green Party	MDG	796	0.52%	0	0	0
County Lists for Environment and Solidarity	FMS	757	0.50%	0	0	0
Pensioners' Party	PP	689	0.45%	0	0	0
Liberals-Europe Party		44	0.03%	0	0	0
Valid votes		152,660	100.00%	8	1	9
Rejected votes		442	0.29%			
Total polled		153,102	83.57%			
Registered electors		183,192				

The following candidates were elected:

- Constituency seats - Øystein Hedstrøm (FrP); Sigurd Holemark (H); Odd Holten (KrF); Åsa Solberg Iversen (Ap); Wenche Lyngholm (SV); Kjellaug Nakkim (H); Gunnar Skaug (Ap); and Tom Thoresen (Ap).
- Compensatory seat - Edvard Grimstad (Sp).

===== 1985 =====
Results of the 1985 parliamentary election held on 8 and 9 September 1985:

Party		Party			List Alliance		
Party		Votes	%	Seats	Votes	%	Seats
Labour Party	Ap	74,283	48.92%	5	74,283	49.53%	4
Conservative Party	H	40,399	26.61%	2	47,780	31.86%	3
Centre Party	Sp	9,240	6.09%	0	47,780	31.86%	3
Christian Democratic Party	KrF	13,351	8.79%	1	13,351	8.90%	1
Socialist Left Party	SV	5,562	3.66%	0	5,562	3.71%	0
Progress Party	FrP	4,440	2.92%	0	4,440	2.96%	0
Liberal Party	V	2,665	1.76%	0	2,665	1.78%	0
Pensioners' Party	PP	805	0.53%	0	805	0.54%	0
Red Electoral Alliance	RV	497	0.33%	0	497	0.33%	0
Liberal People's Party	DLF	388	0.26%	0	388	0.26%	0
Communist Party of Norway	K	217	0.14%	0	217	0.14%	0
Valid votes		151,847	100.00%	8	149,988	100.00%	8
Rejected votes		327	0.21%				
Total polled		152,174	85.68%				
Registered electors		177,616					

As the list alliance was entitled to more seats contesting as an alliance than it was contesting as individual parties, the distribution of seats was as list alliance votes. The H-Sp list alliance's additional seat was allocated to the Conservative Party.

The following candidates were elected: Reidun Andreassen (Ap); Georg Apenes (H); Bente Bakke (H); Sigurd Holemark (H); Odd Steinar Holøs (KrF); Åsa Solberg Iversen (Ap); Gunnar Skaug (Ap); and Tom Thoresen (Ap).

===== 1981 =====
Results of the 1981 parliamentary election held on 13 and 14 September 1981:

Party		Votes	%	Seats
Labour Party	Ap	66,461	45.27%	4
Conservative Party	H	41,782	28.46%	3
Christian Democratic Party	KrF	13,300	9.06%	1
Centre Party	Sp	9,869	6.72%	0
Progress Party	FrP	5,414	3.69%	0
Socialist Left Party	SV	4,798	3.27%	0
Liberal Party	V	3,564	2.43%	0
Red Electoral Alliance	RV	652	0.44%	0
Communist Party of Norway	K	428	0.29%	0
Liberal People's Party	DLF	375	0.26%	0
Plebiscite Party		118	0.08%	0
Free Elected Representatives		59	0.04%	0
Valid votes		146,820	100.00%	8
Rejected votes		360	0.24%	
Total polled		147,180	85.39%	
Registered electors		172,355		

The following candidates were elected: Georg Apenes (H); Ingvar Bakken (Ap); Sigurd Holemark (H); Odd Steinar Holøs (KrF); Gunnar Skaug (Ap); Svenn Stray (H); Liv Stubberud (Ap); and Tom Thoresen (Ap).

==== 1970s ====
===== 1977 =====
Results of the 1977 parliamentary election held on 11 and 12 September 1977:

Party		Votes	%	Seats
Labour Party	Ap	70,423	51.43%	5
Conservative Party	H	29,441	21.50%	2
Christian Democratic Party	KrF	16,084	11.75%	1
Centre Party	Sp	10,663	7.79%	0
Socialist Left Party	SV	4,222	3.08%	0
Liberal Party	V	2,245	1.64%	0
Progress Party	FrP	1,792	1.31%	0
New People's Party	DNF	862	0.63%	0
Communist Party of Norway	K	481	0.35%	0
Red Electoral Alliance	RV	458	0.33%	0
Single Person's Party		99	0.07%	0
Norwegian Democratic Party		94	0.07%	0
Free Elected Representatives		75	0.05%	0
Valid votes		136,939	100.00%	8
Rejected votes		285	0.21%	
Total polled		137,224	86.21%	
Registered electors		159,172		

The following candidates were elected: Georg Apenes (H); Ingvar Bakken (Ap); Arvid Johanson (Ap); Lars Korvald (KrF); Thorbjørn Kultorp (Ap); Svenn Stray (H); Liv Stubberud (Ap); and Tom Thoresen (Ap).

===== 1973 =====
Results of the 1973 parliamentary election held on 9 and 10 September 1973:

Party		Votes	%	Seats
Labour Party	Ap	55,670	43.12%	4
Conservative Party	H	22,265	17.24%	1
Christian Democratic Party	KrF	17,159	13.29%	1
Socialist Electoral League	SV	13,625	10.55%	1
Centre Party	Sp	11,145	8.63%	1
Anders Lange's Party	ALP	4,832	3.74%	0
New People's Party	DNF	1,799	1.39%	0
Liberal Party	V	1,750	1.36%	0
Red Electoral Alliance	RV	417	0.32%	0
Single Person's Party		211	0.16%	0
Women's Free Elected Representatives		123	0.10%	0
Norwegian Democratic Party		121	0.09%	0
Valid votes		129,117	100.00%	8
Rejected votes		291	0.22%	
Total polled		129,408	83.49%	
Registered electors		154,998		

The following candidates were elected: Ingvar Bakken (Ap); Otto Hauglin (SV); Arvid Johanson (Ap); Lars Korvald (KrF); Thorbjørn Kultorp (Ap); Anton Skulberg (Sp); Svenn Stray (H); and Liv Stubberud (Ap).

==== 1960s ====
===== 1969 =====
Results of the 1969 parliamentary election held on 7 and 8 September 1969:

Party		Votes	%	Seats
Labour Party	Ap	71,102	54.15%	5
Conservative Party	H	22,551	17.18%	1
Christian Democratic Party	KrF	13,566	10.33%	1
Centre Party	Sp	13,264	10.10%	1
Liberal Party	V	5,297	4.03%	0
Socialist People's Party	SF	4,381	3.34%	0
Communist Party of Norway	K	1,136	0.87%	0
Valid votes		131,297	100.00%	8
Rejected votes		318	0.24%	
Total polled		131,615	89.14%	
Registered electors		147,643		

The following candidates were elected: Ingvar Bakken (Ap); Martha Frederikke Johannessen (Ap); Arvid Johanson (Ap); Lars Korvald (KrF); Thorbjørn Kultorp (Ap); Gunnar Skaug (Ap); Anton Skulberg (Sp); and Svenn Stray (H).

===== 1965 =====
Results of the 1965 parliamentary election held on 12 and 13 September 1965:

Party		Votes	%	Seats
Labour Party	Ap	63,041	51.41%	4
Conservative Party	H	24,330	19.84%	2
Centre Party–Liberal Party	Sp-V	14,713	12.00%	1
Christian Democratic Party	KrF	11,109	9.06%	1
Socialist People's Party	SF	8,051	6.57%	0
Communist Party of Norway	K	1,380	1.13%	0
Valid votes		122,624	100.00%	8
Rejected votes		460	0.37%	
Total polled		123,084	89.57%	
Registered electors		137,418		

The following candidates were elected: Ingvar Bakken (Ap); Erik Braadland (Sp-V); Nils Hønsvald (Ap); Martha Frederikke Johannessen (Ap); Arvid Johanson (Ap); Lars Korvald (KrF); Per Sonerud (H); and Svenn Stray (H).

===== 1961 =====
Results of the 1961 parliamentary election held on 11 September 1961:

Party		Votes	%	Seats
Labour Party	Ap	62,845	55.54%	4
Conservative Party	H	21,645	19.13%	2
Christian Democratic Party	KrF	12,630	11.16%	1
Centre Party–Liberal Party	Sp-V	12,507	11.05%	1
Communist Party of Norway	K	3,532	3.12%	0
Wild Votes		1	0.00%	0
Valid votes		113,160	100.00%	8
Rejected votes		698	0.61%	
Total polled		113,858	84.99%	
Registered electors		133,972		

The following candidates were elected: Ingvar Bakken (Ap), 62,840 votes; Erik Braadland (Sp-V), 12,499 votes; Erling Fredriksfryd (H), 21,644 votes; Nils Hønsvald (Ap), 62,840 votes; Henry Jacobsen (Ap), 62,836 votes; Martha Frederikke Johannessen (Ap), 62,837 votes; Lars Korvald (KrF), 12,629 votes; and Svenn Stray (H), 21,641 votes.

==== 1950s ====
===== 1957 =====
Results of the 1957 parliamentary election held on 7 October 1957:

Party		Votes	%	Seats
Labour Party	Ap	60,249	55.10%	5
Conservative Party	H	19,768	18.08%	2
Christian Democratic Party	KrF	12,935	11.83%	1
Farmers' Party	Bp	9,065	8.29%	0
Liberal Party	V	3,407	3.12%	0
Communist Party of Norway	K	2,982	2.73%	0
Norwegian Social Democratic Party		930	0.85%	0
Valid votes		109,336	100.00%	8
Rejected votes		598	0.54%	
Total polled		109,934	83.79%	
Registered electors		131,200		

The following candidates were elected: Ingvar Bakken (Ap); Erling Fredriksfryd (H); Nils Hønsvald (Ap); Henry Jacobsen (Ap); Martha Frederikke Johannessen (Ap); Arvid Johanson (Ap); Asbjørn Solberg (KrF); and Svenn Stray (H).

===== 1953 =====
Results of the 1953 parliamentary election held on 12 October 1953:

Party		Votes	%	Seats
Labour Party	Ap	58,120	54.20%	5
Conservative Party	H	18,229	17.00%	1
Christian Democratic Party	KrF	13,476	12.57%	1
Farmers' Party	Bp	9,139	8.52%	1
Communist Party of Norway	K	4,465	4.16%	0
Liberal Party	V	3,810	3.55%	0
Valid votes		107,239	100.00%	8
Rejected votes		547	0.51%	
Total polled		107,786	84.02%	
Registered electors		128,286		

The following candidates were elected: Arthur Arntzen (Ap); Wilhelm Engel Bredal (Bp); Erling Fredriksfryd (H); Nils Hønsvald (Ap); Henry Jacobsen (Ap); Karl Henry Karlsen (Ap); Klara Amalie Skoglund (Ap); and Asbjørn Solberg (KrF).

==== 1940s ====
===== 1949 =====
Results of the 1949 parliamentary election held on 10 October 1949:

Party		Votes	%	Seats
Labour Party	Ap	36,602	51.63%	3
Conservative Party–Farmers' Party–Liberal Party	H-Bp-V	20,894	29.47%	2
Christian Democratic Party	KrF	10,299	14.53%	1
Communist Party of Norway	K	2,781	3.92%	0
Society Party	Samfp	321	0.45%	0
Valid votes		70,897	100.00%	6
Rejected votes		525	0.74%	
Total polled		71,422	85.90%	
Registered electors		83,149		

The following candidates were elected: Arthur Arntzen (Ap); Anton Berge (Ap); Wilhelm Engel Bredal (H-Bp-V); Sverre Gjørwad (H-Bp-V); Klara Amalie Skoglund (Ap); and Asbjørn Solberg (KrF).

===== 1945 =====
Results of the 1945 parliamentary election held on 8 October 1945:

Party		Party			List Alliance		
Party		Votes	%	Seats	Votes	%	Seats
Labour Party	Ap	25,283	42.12%	3	25,283	42.13%	3
Christian Democratic Party	KrF	13,043	21.73%	1	13,043	21.73%	1
Conservative Party	H	7,162	11.93%	1	13,938	23.23%	2
Farmers' Party	Bp	6,794	11.32%	1	13,938	23.23%	2
Communist Party of Norway	K	5,756	9.59%	0	5,756	9.59%	0
Liberal Party	V	1,990	3.32%	0	1,990	3.32%	0
Valid votes		60,028	100.00%	6	60,010	100.00%	6
Rejected votes		539	0.89%				
Total polled		60,567	79.85%				
Registered electors		75,849					

As the list alliance was not entitled to more seats contesting as an alliance than it was contesting as individual parties, the distribution of seats was as party votes.

The following candidates were elected: Arthur Arntzen (Ap); Wilhelm Engel Bredal (Bp); Leif Grøner (H); Magnus Johansen (Ap); Klara Amalie Skoglund (Ap); and Asbjørn Solberg (KrF).

==== 1930s ====
===== 1936 =====
Results of the 1936 parliamentary election held on 19 October 1936:

Party		Party			List Alliance		
Party		Votes	%	Seats	Votes	%	Seats
Labour Party	Ap	29,840	49.04%	4	29,840	49.05%	3
Conservative Party	H	12,370	20.33%	1	29,431	48.38%	3
Farmers' Party	Bp	11,354	18.66%	1	29,431	48.38%	3
Liberal Party	V	5,728	9.41%	0	29,431	48.38%	3
Nasjonal Samling	NS	1,195	1.96%	0	1,195	1.96%	0
Society Party	Samfp	365	0.60%	0	365	0.60%	0
Valid votes		60,852	100.00%	6	60,831	100.00%	6
Rejected votes		276	0.45%				
Total polled		61,128	85.16%				
Registered electors		71,776					

As the list alliance was entitled to more seats contesting as an alliance than it was contesting as individual parties, the distribution of seats was as list alliance votes. The H-Bp-V list alliance's additional seat was allocated to the Conservative Party.

The following candidates were elected: Magnus Johansen (Ap); Andreas Maastad (Bp); Anton Julius Mosbæk (Ap); John August Solberg (H); Peter Olai Thorvik (Ap); and Johan Undrum (H).

===== 1933 =====
Results of the 1933 parliamentary election held on 16 October 1933:

Party		Party			List Alliance		
Party		Votes	%	Seats	Votes	%	Seats
Labour Party	Ap	24,744	47.26%	4	24,744	47.31%	3
Farmers' Party	Bp	11,658	22.26%	1	20,932	40.03%	3
Conservative Party	H	9,339	17.84%	1	20,932	40.03%	3
Liberal Party	V	5,632	10.76%	0	5,632	10.77%	0
Nasjonal Samling	NS	716	1.37%	0	716	1.37%	0
Communist Party of Norway	K	273	0.52%	0	273	0.52%	0
Valid votes		52,362	100.00%	6	52,297	100.00%	6
Rejected votes		174	0.33%				
Total polled		52,536	78.13%				
Registered electors		67,239					

As the list alliance was entitled to more seats contesting as an alliance than it was contesting as individual parties, the distribution of seats was as list alliance votes. The Bp-H list alliance's additional seat was allocated to the Farmers' Party.

The following candidates were elected: Johannes Olaf Bergersen (Ap); Birger Braadland (Bp); Andreas Maastad (Bp); August Thorvald Svendsen (Ap); Peter Olai Thorvik (Ap); and Johan Undrum (H).

===== 1930 =====
Results of the 1930 parliamentary election held on 20 October 1930:

Party		Votes	%	Seats
Labour Party	Ap	17,937	36.66%	3
Farmers' Party	Bp	14,000	28.61%	2
Conservative Party	H	11,576	23.66%	1
Liberal Party	V	5,278	10.79%	0
Communist Party of Norway	K	136	0.28%	0
Wild Votes		2	0.00%	0
Valid votes		48,929	100.00%	6
Rejected votes		216	0.44%	
Total polled		49,145	78.34%	
Registered electors		62,730		

The following candidates were elected: Johannes Olaf Bergersen (Ap); Peder Kolstad (Bp); Andreas Maastad (Bp); August Thorvald Svendsen (Ap); Peter Olai Thorvik (Ap); and Johan Undrum (H).

==== 1920s ====
===== 1927 =====
Results of the 1927 parliamentary election held on 17 October 1927:

Party		Votes	%	Seats
Labour Party	Ap	18,752	45.34%	3
Farmers' Party	Bp	11,226	27.15%	2
Conservative Party–Free-minded Liberal Party	H-FV	8,334	20.15%	1
Liberal Party	V	3,043	7.36%	0
Valid votes		41,355	100.00%	6
Rejected votes		311	0.75%	
Total polled		41,666	69.86%	
Registered electors		59,642		

The following candidates were elected: Johannes Olaf Bergersen (Ap); Henrik Christian Henriksen (Ap); Gunder Anton Johannesen Jahren (H-FV); Peder Kolstad (Bp); Andreas Maastad (Bp); and Peter Olai Thorvik (Ap).

===== 1924 =====
Results of the 1924 parliamentary election held on 21 October 1924:

Party		Votes	%	Seats
Social Democratic Labour Party of Norway	S	11,200	29.29%	2
Farmers' Party	Bp	10,708	28.00%	2
Conservative Party–Free-minded Liberal Party	H-FV	9,806	25.64%	2
Liberal Party	V	3,092	8.09%	0
Labour Party	Ap	3,048	7.97%	0
Communist Party of Norway	K	387	1.01%	0
Valid votes		38,241	100.00%	6
Rejected votes		409	1.06%	
Total polled		38,650	68.74%	
Registered electors		56,229		

The following candidates were elected: Johannes Olaf Bergersen (S); Johan Kristian Hansen Ileby (H-FV); Gunder Anton Johannesen Jahren (H-FV); Peder Kolstad (Bp); Andreas Maastad (Bp); and Peter Olai Thorvik (S).

===== 1921 =====
Results of the 1921 parliamentary election held on 24 October 1921:

Party		Votes	%	Seats
Conservative Party–Free-minded Liberal Party	H-FV	10,012	30.10%	2
Social Democratic Labour Party of Norway	S	9,192	27.64%	2
Norwegian Farmers' Association	L	7,030	21.14%	1
Liberal Party	V	3,773	11.34%	1
Labour Party	Ap	3,251	9.77%	0
Wild Votes		2	0.01%	0
Valid votes		33,260	100.00%	6
Rejected votes		398	1.18%	
Total polled		33,658	63.77%	
Registered electors		52,784		

The following candidates were elected: Johannes Olaf Bergersen (S); Johan Kristian Hansen Ileby (H-FV); Gunder Anton Johannesen Jahren (H-FV); Peder Kolstad (L); Fredrik Maseng (V); and Peter Olai Thorvik (S).
