= Standing Committee on Scrutiny and Constitutional Affairs =

Norwegian parliamentary committee

The Standing Committee on Scrutiny and Constitutional Affairs (Norwegian: Kontroll- og konstitusjonskomiteen) is a standing committee of the Parliament of Norway. It holds a supervisory role in relation to the proceedings of the parliament and public sector. The committee has 12 members and is chaired by Peter Frølich of the Conservative Party.

The rules require that all parliamentary parties be represented on this committee and by convention, the committee is chaired by a member of the largest opposition party.

From 1814 to 1972, the supervision of parliament was the responsibility of the Protocol Committee. From 1972 to 1981, it was dealt with by the standing committees. The Standing Committee on Scrutiny and Constitutional Affairs was established in 1981. It was reorganized and strengthened in 1993.

== Leadership ==
The committee is headed by a chair, along with two vice chairs. Between 1993 and 2001, the committee had only one vice chair.

Key
Centre Party
Christian Democratic Party
Conservative Party
Labour Party
Liberal Party
Progress Party
Socialist Left Party

=== Chairs ===
Portrait	Name	Party	Took office	Left office	Tenure
	Petter Thomassen	Conservative	21 October 1993	30 September 1997	3 years, 344 days
	Jørgen Kosmo	Labour	21 October 1997	17 March 2000	2 years, 148 days
	Gunnar Skaug	Labour	23 March 2000	30 September 2001	1 year, 191 days
	Ågot Valle	Socialist Left	22 October 2001	30 September 2005	3 years, 343 days
	Lodve Solholm	Progress	19 October 2005	30 September 2009	3 years, 346 days
	Anders Anundsen	Progress	20 October 2009	30 September 2013	3 years, 345 days
	Martin Kolberg	Labour	22 October 2013	30 September 2017	3 years, 343 days
	Dag Terje Andersen	Labour	17 October 2017	30 September 2021	3 years, 348 days
	Peter Christian Frølich	Conservative	28 October 2021	present	3 years, 330 days

=== Vice Chairs ===
==== First Vice Chairs ====
Portrait	Name	Party	Took office	Left office	Tenure
	Tom Thoresen	Labour	21 October 1993	29 October 1996	3 years, 8 days
	Gunnar Skaug	Labour	29 October 1996	30 September 1997	336 days
	Odd Holten	Christian Democratic	21 October 1997	30 September 2001	3 years, 344 days
	Martin Engeset	Conservative	22 October 2001	30 September 2005	3 years, 343 days
	Inge Ryan	Socialist Left	19 October 2005	24 November 2007	2 years, 36 days
	Øystein Djupedal	Socialist Left	27 November 2007	30 September 2009	1 year, 307 days
	Ola Borten Moe	Centre	20 October 2009	4 March 2011	1 year, 135 days
	Per Olaf Lundteigen	Centre	12 April 2011	30 September 2013	2 years, 171 days
	Michael Tetzschner	Conservative	22 October 2013	30 September 2017	3 years, 343 days
	Svein Harberg	Conservative	17 October 2017	30 September 2021	3 years, 348 days
	Sverre Myrli	Labour	28 October 2021	26 November 2021	29 days
	Lubna Jaffery	Labour	30 November 2021	28 June 2023	1 year, 210 days
	Frode Jacobsen	Labour	27 July 2023	present	2 years, 58 days

==== Second Vice Chair ====
Portrait	Name	Party	Took office	Left office	Tenure
	Kjell Engebretsen	Labour	22 October 2001	30 September 2005	3 years, 343 days
	Svein Roald Hansen	Labour	19 October 2005	30 September 2009	3 years, 346 days
	Martin Kolberg	Labour	20 October 2009	30 September 2013	3 years, 345 days
	Kenneth Svendsen	Progress	22 October 2013	2 October 2015	1 year, 345 days
	Helge Thorheim	Progress	2 October 2015	30 September 2017	1 year, 363 days
	Nils T. Bjørke	Centre	17 October 2017	30 September 2021	3 years, 348 days
	Svein Harberg	Conservative	28 October 2021	present	3 years, 330 days
