= Karl Karlsen =

Karl Karlsen may refer to:

- Carl Carlsen (1880–1958), Danish wrestler
- Karl Henry Karlsen (1893–1979), Norwegian politician
