= Abid Raja =

Norwegian lawyer and politician (born 1975)

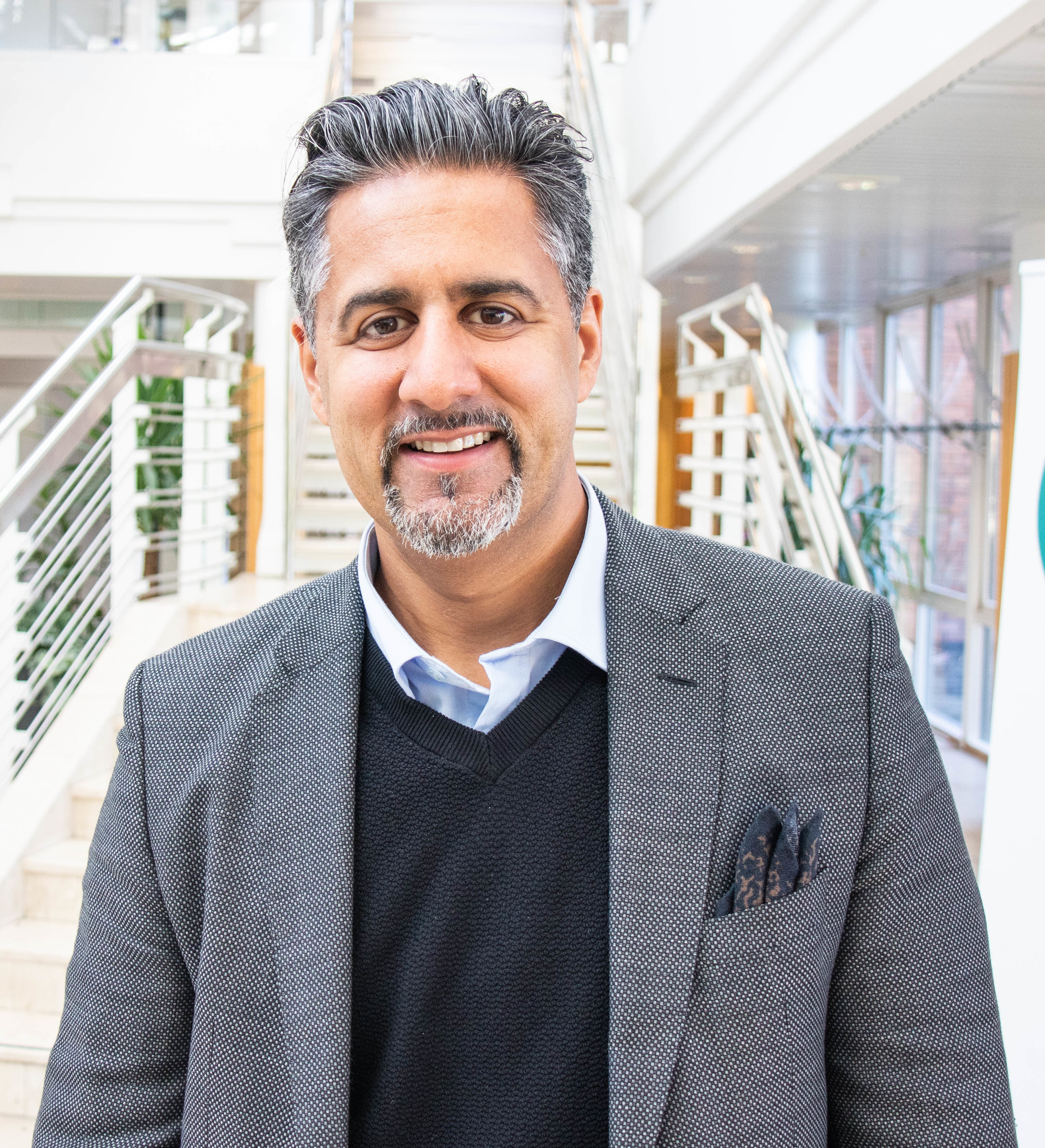
- Raja in 2018

Second Deputy Leader of the Liberal Party
- Incumbent
- Assumed office 26 September 2020
- Leader: Guri Melby
- Preceded by: Terje Breivik

Minister of Culture, Sports and Equality
- In office 24 January 2020 – 14 October 2021
- Prime Minister: Erna Solberg
- Preceded by: Trine Skei Grande
- Succeeded by: Anette Trettebergstuen

Fifth Vice President of the Storting
- In office 7 October 2017 – 24 January 2020
- President: Olemic Thommessen; Tone W. Trøen
- Preceded by: Line Henriette Holten
- Succeeded by: Ingjerd Schou

Member of the Storting
- Incumbent
- Assumed office 17 October 2013
- Deputy: Solveig Schytz
- Constituency: Akershus

Personal details
- Born: 5 November 1975 (age 50) Oslo, Norway
- Party: Liberal
- Spouse: Nadia Ansar
- Children: 3
- Education: University of Oxford; University of Oslo; University of Southampton
- Occupation: Politician
- Profession: Lawyer

Abid Qayyum Raja (born 5 November 1975) is a Norwegian lawyer and Liberal Party politician who served as Minister of Culture from 2020 to 2021. He was elected to the Storting as representative for Akershus in 2013 where he served as second deputy chair of the Standing Committee on Transport and Communications and also is a member of the Standing Committee on Scrutiny and Constitutional Affairs. In October 2017, Raja was elected as the vice-president of the Storting, the second time in Norway's history that a Muslim has been elected to that office.

Raja has written three books, the latter of which My fault (Min skyld) won the 2021 Norwegian Bookseller's Prize and was the most sold non-fiction book in Norway in 2021 and 2022.

== Early life ==
Born in Oslo into a family of Pakistani descent, he was raised in the St. Hanshaugen neighborhood in Oslo. His father Abdul Qayyum Raja (1937– ) was a factory worker who worked at the Christiania Spigerverk steel plant in Nydalen, while his mother Akthar Nasim (1949–2021) was a homemaker. Raja describes his parents as someone who "used violence as a part of the parenting, violence was relatively common in my community". In 1992, at age 15 he was taken away from home due to the ongoing violence in the household. He was subsequently placed in a hospice for recovering drug-addicts, which he later would describe as a "hellish dump". After being relocated to a nearby orphanage, he dropped out of high school.

After six months at the orphanage, he was allowed to move back home, after which his parents sent him to Pakistan. Upon his return to Norway, he re-enrolled in high-school and according to him "had his mind set on becoming a lawyer" after seeing Kevin Costner in the film JFK.

=== Education ===
After graduating from Foss Upper Secondary School, he enrolled at University of Southampton, and graduated with a degree in Human Rights and Behavioural Sciences in Law. Raja was in 2003 the first non-ethnic Norwegian to receive the Norway Scholarship that have been rewarded since 1920 at University of Oxford, Wadham College and there he studied for the MSc degree in Psychology. He holds also an undergraduate degree in Criminology and Master of Law degree Cand.jur. degree from University of Oslo cum laude.

== Career ==
=== Lawyer ===
He has worked as a criminal defence lawyer for four years and been civil case litigator for two. During his years as criminal defense lawyer he was appointed by the court to be lead defence lawyer on several murder-cases, in and abroad of the country, and he also had the lead defense on several largest drug cases in Norwegian history. While working as a lawyer, Raja also took advantage of the position a famous lawyer gets by advocating civil rights for all, defending poor peoples rights and helping ethnic minorities fight injustice.

=== Diplomat ===
In 2008, Raja was appointed by the Norwegian Government, King in Council, to be office bearer as Board Leader of Norwegian Immigration Appeals Board, equivalent to a judge in a refugee court. After this he also served as Police Prosecutor at the National Police Immigration Service, and was later posted as a diplomat at the Royal Norwegian Embassy in New Delhi, India.

=== Parliament ===
A member of the Norwegian Liberal Party, he was at the end of 2012 nominated as the top candidate for Akershus Venstre in the 2013 Norwegian parliamentary election. He is thus the first person in Norwegian politics with minority background to be nominated at top of a ballot-list for National parliament election. He was elected to the Storting in September 2013 for a four-year term. In June 2016, he was re-nominated by the Akershus Liberal Party as their top-candidate for the general election that were held in September 2017.

=== Minister of Culture and Equality ===
Following the Progress Party's withdrawal from government in January 2020, Raja was appointed Minister of Culture and Sports, succeeding his party leader Trine Skei Grande, who had been appointed Minister of Education. One of his first major cases as minister, was to deal with restrictions regarding the spread of COVID-19 in the country regarding sports. Measures that were applied, were that football and other sports with audiences, should not have fully packed tribunes and that players should keep distance while playing.

==== 2020 ====
By May, the government lifted restrictions and allowed children's football to be in close contact while playing, effective 15 June.

The month after, he expressed shock after learning that the NIF had lacked to make reports and work more effectively against racism. He demanded that they'd make a report on racism. The NIF expressed appreciation for Raja's initiative and that they will work constructively together to fight racism in sports.

In July, the government allowed for foreign film production to take place in Norway, with Raja himself approving that Tom Cruise and the crew of Mission: Impossible – Dead Reckoning Part One being allowed to shoot in Møre og Romsdal in August.

In mid-August, he announced his final decision to run for the Liberal Party leadership to succeed outgoing Trine Skei Grande, becoming the second Liberal politician to announce their intention to seek the leadership after Sveinung Rotevatn. Raja was however open to becoming deputy leader if the party wished for it.

On 23 August, he was designated deputy leader of the party, with Rotevatn as first deputy and Melby as party leader, unanimously by the party's election committee. At the party conference in September, he was elected second deputy leader, with Melby as leader and Rotevatn as first deputy, unopposed.

On 30 September, the government announced that contact training for broad sports would be allowed from 12 October, and at the same time would allow for a larger field of audiences to attend matches. Raja also stated that every municipality should evaluate themselves whether or not it's safe to allow contact training.

The government took a u-turn after it had not included Sámi culture and museums in their COVID-19 budget support package. Raja expressed in November that there was no doubt that the pandemic had affected the Sámi culture life equally. He added that the government had put forward 1,2 million NOK in support of Sámi museums, and proposed 400,000 NOK to Sámi stage art.

Raja condemned harassment against Sámi people in December, after a Sámi woman was told by two elderly women on a bus in Tromsø to shut up speaking Sámi. He stated that he and the government stood behind the Sámi people, and expressed it was important for such events to see the light of day.

==== 2021 ====
In February 2021, he faced controversy when it was revealed that 68,6 million NOK of the incentive pot was given to production of Mission: Impossible 8. Producer Synnøve Hørsdal said that "Norway shouldn't waste 70 million NOK so that Raja can get a new selfie with [Tom] Cruise". She also expressed that the budget should have been spent on Norwegian productions rather than foreign ones during the COVID-19 pandemic. Raja defended the spending, stating that it was the Mission: Impossible production's own decision to apply for filming in the country, and the fact that they were allowed, was decided by the NFI and not him.

A "summer group" set up by Raja consisting of event hosts and professionals concluded in March 2021 that summer events and festivals could return to normal by summer. Raja expressed gratitude for the group's findings and encouraged them to continue their for as long as necessary, and sympathised that people wants to return to a normal summer, but that many factors are at play. The summer group themselves further expressed that necessary restrictions would still be necessary to further open up for as many as possible. They also proposed quick testing at festival sights and digital immune passports for people to use to prove they have been vaccinated or tested.

Following a controversial tweet by former Swedish prime minister Carl Bildt commemorating the events of the German occupation of Norway, Raja stated "9 April was one of the saddest and darkest days in Norwegian history. I was not just shocked and disappointed, but also a little bit hurt, when I saw the tweet". He further stated "I had hoped that our closest neighbour was more sympathetic to how this day is looked back on by Norwegians and Norwegian jews. And I hope Bildt will realize how he with his tweet hurt many in Norway. It is allowed to regret, and withdraw his tweet". He was supported by Conservative member of parliament Lene Westgaard-Halle, who stated that Sweden "let Hitler invade Norway".

Raja announced in June 2021, the governments intention to make "Norway the first country to be free of racism". He further stated that it would be possible during his lifetime through self-knowledge, action plans and more funds. The proposal was criticised by the Red Party and Labour Party, the former calling it a lack of mercy three months before the election. The latter stated that the government had done too little in regards to racism despite their promises to do so. Raja's proposal did however receive full support from UNICEF Norway, whose director called it an "ambitious goal" and important.

Raja attended the film festival in Cannes in July 2021 for the film The Worst Person in the World directed by Joachim Trier. It was reported that he had to go to a dentist after expressing pain in a tooth, and he also fainted at a pharmacy when picking up antibiotics.

After the tenth anniversary of the 22 July attacks, Raja criticised Progress Party leader Sylvi Listhaug for her support of former Oslo mayor Fabian Stang's Facebook post where he criticised Labour Party leader Jonas Gahr Støre, and stated that he had made 22 July party politics. Raja expressed his support for the Workers' Youth League's uproar against the right wing extremism behind the attacks. He further stated that the Labour Party or Workers' Youth League have driven party politics using the attack as an argument, but rather the contrary and that they have been careful when using it.

After NRK revealed that photos of female athletes had been circulated in a group on Reddit under sexual purposes in August 2021, Raja told NRK that “it is disgraceful that our female athletes have been sexualised and abused in this way”. He also added that the discovery makes it clear why athletes should choose their own clothing. He also said he was going to reach out to his other Nordic counterparts to set out a strong front in support of female athletes, in the fight against the leadership of the International Handball Federation.

At the end of August, Raja issued a congratulations video to 15-year-old Aleksandra Javorac-Bore from Stavanger for receiving the Homofryd prize, after she told Stavanger Aftenblad back in April about her experiences of bullying and harassment due to her sexual orientation. Raja expressed he felt touched by her story and expressed that she had his and the Norwegian people's support.

On 9 September, Raja announced that the aid scheme for the cultural sector would be expanded to last until at least the end of the year.

On 24 September, Raja proposed a ban against foreign online game companies, notably Unibet, Betsson and ComeOn. Raja mentioned Denmark and France as examples, who also put in a similar ban. His proposal received mixed reception, with the Progress Party's Himanshu Gulati who called it “censorship, abuse of power and an attack on the free Internet reminiscent of authoritarian dictatorships”. Several representatives from the mentioned companies either expressed they were following Norwegian law and didn't make profit as Raja accused them of. He did however receive praise from Norsk Tipping, who saw the proposal as an extension of the government's already proposed new gambling law.

On 30 September, Raja and his Nordic counterparts issued a joint letter to the International Handball Federation calling for the rules to be changed for women's clothing. Raja personally expressed that he hoped the letter would make time for a change against what he described as discrimination and old fashioned. The same day he opened the newly constructed Sola Arena in Sola Municipality.

Following the government's defeat in the 2021 parliamentary election, he was succeeded by Anette Trettebergstuen.

== Other ==
Raja participated in the second season of Maskorama, the Norwegian equivalent of Masked Singer, disguised as the Nisse and on the second season of the Norwegian version of game show Wipeout.

In November 2023, both Raja and his wife Nadia Ansar attended an event in Stavanger for Schizofrenidagene 2023 with the topic of change, while also promoting Ansar's new book Min skam.

During the launch of the Myklebust Viking ship in April 2024 in Nordfjordeid, Raja acted as a Viking Lawspeaker during a wedding onboard the ship.

== Advocacy and positions in public debate ==
Raja has been a well known person in the media since his days as student. He has served as a spokesperson for Norwegian-Pakistani students and the World Islamic Mission mosque. As a lawyer and columnist for Aftenposten and Morgenbladet, he is frequently a debater in Norwegian society.

In the years 2009-2011 he organized a series of dialogue meetings at the House of Literature, with controversial topics, such as why there is hate among Muslims, Jews and homosexuals. In these debates the leaders of Norway from all position participated; ranging from at that time Norwegian Secretary of State Jonas Gahr Støre, the chief of PST, chief editors of largest Medias, even the Norwegian Royal Crown Prince. For this effort Raja was also rewarded the highest Freedom of Speech award.

Raja has been a lifelong opponent of spanking and corporal punishment of children. This stems from his experiences as a child growing up in Norway, where he was subjected to severe cane-whipping by the local Koranic teacher at the mosque as well as corporal punishment by his Pakistani parents and as a result contacted child protective services on his own, who took him into protective care for six months. In response to revelations about child abuse in a Mosque, he called for Koranic teachers which are found to have beaten children to immediately leave Norway, stating that "they are not welcome".

After a memorial service for the victims of the World Trade Center attack in 2001 (at the American Church, Frogner, Oslo), he said it is "important that moderate Muslims ... share the sorrow and distance ourselves from extremist violence and acts of terror".

He has voiced opposition to forced marriages as well as marriages based on the caste system within the south-Asian community in Norway. Also an outspoken opponent of arranged marriages, of which he said in 2013; "it is essential to break up the marriage pattern in the Norwegian-Pakistani community, so that arranged marriages becomes uncommon".

Raja founded the Norwegian think tank Minotenk and has as member of Parliament been both founding member of and member of the steering committee of International Panel of Parliamentarians for Freedom of Religion or Belief.

== Personal life ==
Raja is married to psychologist Nadia Ansar. They first met while he was studying law, and she was studying psychology at the University of Oslo. They currently reside in the Ekeberg district of Oslo, along with their three children, twins Maya and Sara, and son Adam.

== Awards ==
In 2010, Raja was awarded the Fritt Ord Award for freedom of speech. On 15 November 2017 he was named the 2018 recipient of the International Religious Liberty Association's International Award for Outstanding Leadership in Religious Freedom Advocacy.

== Bibliography ==
Raja has written three books. Spokesman is mainly about integrations issues in Norway, while Dialog is about common struggle Europe faces regarding radicalization and extremism. My Fault is about Raja's childhood and upbringing, and the challenges he faced in his life.

- Talsmann (English: Spokesman), Aschehoug forlag. (2008) ISBN 9788203234286
- Dialog - om vold undertrykkelse og ekstremisme (English: Dialogue on violence, oppression and extremism), Cappelen Damm. (2010) ISBN 9788202348427
- Min skyld - en historie om frigjørelse (English: My fault, a story about liberation), Cappelen Damm. (2021) ISBN 9788202713461

Political offices
Preceded by Line Henriette Holten	Fifth Vice President of the Storting; 2017–2020	Succeeded by Ingjerd Schou
Preceded by Trine Skei Grande	Minister of Culture; 2020–2021	Succeeded by Anette Trettebergstuen
Party political offices
Preceded by Terje Breivik	Second Deputy Leader of the Norwegian Liberal Party; 2020–	Succeeded by Incumbent
Awards
Preceded by Nina Karin Monsen	Recipient of the Fritt Ord Award; 2010 (shared with Bushra Ishaq)	Succeeded by Anders Sømme Hammer
