= Arthur Arntzen =

Arthur Arntzen may refer to:

- Arthur Arntzen (politician) (1906–1997), Norwegian politician
- Arthur Arntzen (writer) (1937–2025), Norwegian humorist
