= Remi Sølvberg =

Norwegian politician (born 1976)

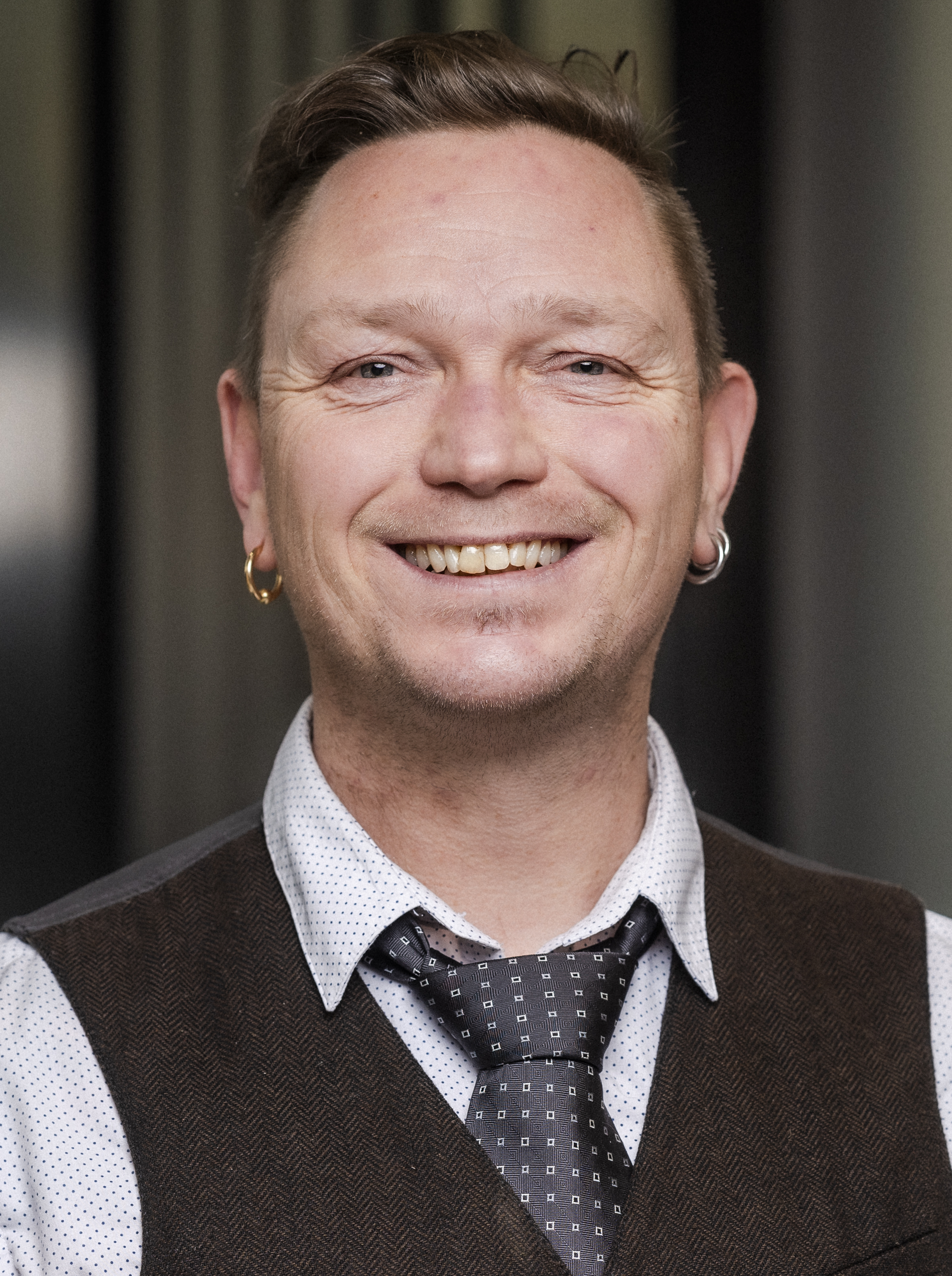
- Sølvberg in February 2025

Member of the Storting
- Incumbent
- Assumed office 1 October 2025
- Constituency: Østfold

Personal details
- Born: 5 August 1976 (age 49)
- Party: Red Party
- Website: remipaatinget.no

Remi Alexander Sølvberg (born 5 August 1976) is a Norwegian politician and member of the Storting. A member of the Red Party, he was elected to represent Østfold at the 2025 parliamentary election.

Sølvberg was born on 5 August 1976. He is a tattoo artist and has run his own tattoo parlour in Moss since 1999. He is vocalist in the punk rock band Decibøllene. He was chairman of the Kråkereiret/Blinken rock club in Moss in the mid-1990s.

Sølvberg has been a member of the municipal council in Moss since 2016. He was elected to the Storting at the 2025 parliamentary election as one of the Red Party's five compensatory (levelling) seats.

Sølvberg is married and has a son.
