= Åsa Solberg Iversen =

Norwegian politician

Åsa Solberg Iversen (born 7 April 1929 in Overhalla Municipality, Nord-Trøndelag, died 3 February 2009 in Fredrikstad) was a Norwegian politician for the Arbeiderpartiet. She was elected to the Stortinget from Østfold in 1985. She was deputy representative from 1973–1977, 1977–1981, and 1981–1985.

== Roles ==
- 1 January 1973 – 1 January 1976: personal secretary Social Department

== Storting committees ==
- 1989–1993: member of Standing Committee on Business and Industry
- 1985–1989: member of Control Committee
- 1985–1989: member of Standing Committee on Defence
- 1981–1985: member of Standing Committee on Justice
