= Stein Erik Lauvås =

Norwegian politician (born 1965)

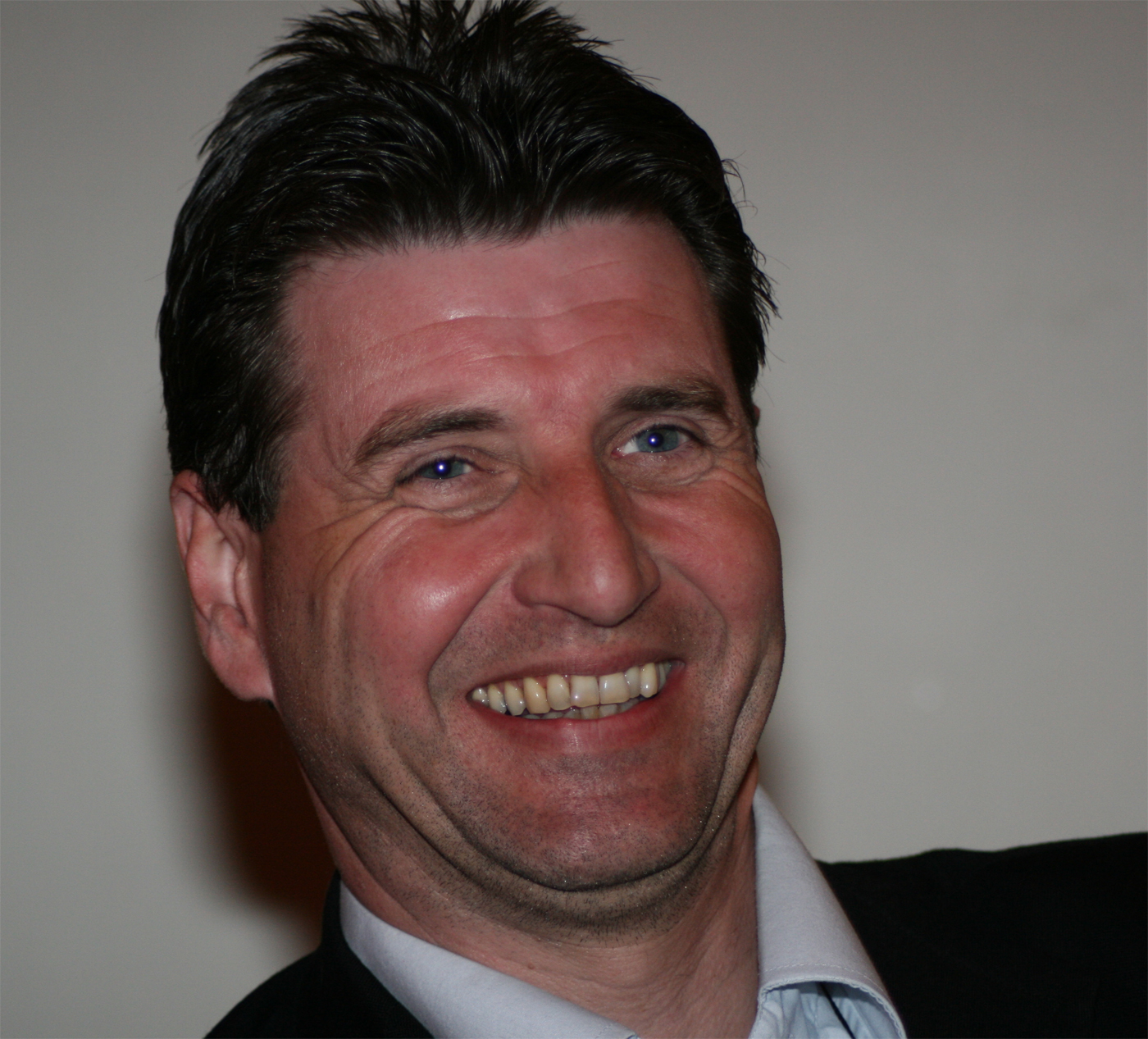
Stein Erik Lauvås

Stein Erik Lauvås (born 3 May 1965) is a Norwegian politician for the Labour Party.

He served as a deputy representative to the Norwegian Parliament from Østfold during the terms 2001–2005 and 2005–2009.

On the local level Lauvås has been the mayor of Marker municipality since 2003.
