= Elise Bjørnebekk-Waagen =

Norwegian politician (born 1990)

Elise Waagen
- Born: 19 February 1990 (age 36)
- Occupation: Politician
- Political party: Labour Party

Elise Bjørnebekk-Waagen (born 19 February 1990) is a Norwegian politician for the Labour Party.

After serving as a deputy representative during the term 2013–2017, she was elected representative from the constituency of Østfold to the Storting for the period 2017–2021. She was re-elected for the period 2021–2025. In 2021 she became second deputy leader of the Standing Committee on Education, Research and Church Affairs

Bjørnebekk-Waagen was among the survivors from the Utøya massacre in 2011, where she was shot in the knee. She was a member of Sarpsborg municipal council from 2015 to 2019.
