= Leif Grøner =

Norwegian politician (1884–1971)

Leif Grøner (12 November 1884 – 17 October 1971) was a Norwegian banker and politician for the Conservative Party.

He was born in Bodø as a dean's son. He finished his secondary education in 1903, took military education for one year, and then studied law, graduating from the Royal Frederick University with the cand.jur. degree in 1908. After three years as an attorney in Nordfjord from 1910 to 1913, he forayed into banking. He was first a bank director in Måløy until 1916. After seven years in Oslobanken he briefly moved to Molde in 1923. From 1924 to 1954, he was a bank director in Fredrikstad.

During the German occupation of Norway, Grøner was a staff member in a local Milorg branch. He was elected to the Norwegian Parliament from Østfold in 1945, but was not re-elected in 1949. Grøner did not hold local political office.

He was a board member of Rena Kartonfabrik and supervisory council member of Forenede Industrier, and member of the control committee in Norges Kommunalbank and Norges hypotekforening for næringslivet. Grøner resided at Blommenholm in his later life. He died in 1971.
