= Bjørnar Laabak =

Norwegian politician

Member of the Storting
- Incumbent
- Assumed office 1 October 2025
- Constituency: Østfold

Deputy Mayor of Fredrikstad
- In office 19 October 2023 – 23 October 2025
- Mayor: Arne Sekkelsten (H)
- Preceded by: Atle Ottesen (Ap)
- Succeeded by: Ole Johan Lakselv (FrP)

Personal details
- Born: 5 January 1961 (age 65)
- Party: Progress

Bjørnar Laabak (born 5 January 1961) is a Norwegian politician from the right-wing Progress Party (FrP). From December 2016 to January 2018, he served as State Secretary.

He was elected to the Storting in the 2025 Norwegian parliamentary election.

== Biography ==
Laabak was appointed State Secretary in the Solberg government on 20 December 2016. As such, he served in the Ministry of Local Government and Modernization under Minister Jan Tore Sanner until the FrP left the government. In the 2017 and 2021 parliamentary elections, he was first Vararepresentant, or substitute MP, for the Fremskrittspartiet in the Østfold constituency. In this capacity, he served on over 200 days.

In the 2023 Norwegian local elections, he ran for mayor of Fredrikstad Municipality as a candidate for the Fremskrittspartiet. He eventually became deputy mayor.

He was elected to the Storting in the 2025 Norwegian parliamentary election.
