= Anton Berge =

Norwegian agronomist and politician

Anton Berge (29 October 1892 – 4 July 1951) was a Norwegian agronomist and politician for the Labour Party.

He was born in Gjemnes Municipality. He was elected to the Norwegian Parliament from Østfold in 1950. However, less than a year into his term he died and was replaced by Karl Henry Karlsen.

Berge was a member of the executive committee of the municipal council for Råde Municipality in the periods 1928–1931 and 1931–1934, and was a regular municipality council member in 1925–1928 and 1937–1940.
