= Liv Stubberud =

Norwegian politician

Member of the Norwegian Parliament for Østfold
- Incumbent
- Assumed office 1973

Personal details
- Born: May 29, 1930 Rakkestad, Norway
- Died: September 16, 1997 (aged 67)
- Party: Labour Party

Liv Stubberud (29 May 1930, in Rakkestad – 16 September 1997) was a Norwegian politician in the Labour Party.

She was elected to the Norwegian Parliament from Østfold in 1973 and was re-elected on three occasions. She had previously served as a deputy representative during the terms 1965–1969 and 1969–1973. From September to October 1973 she served as a regular representative, filling in for Martha Frederikke Johannessen, who had died.

On the local level, she was a member of Rakkestad municipality council from 1963 to 1975.
