= Tage Pettersen =

Norwegian politician

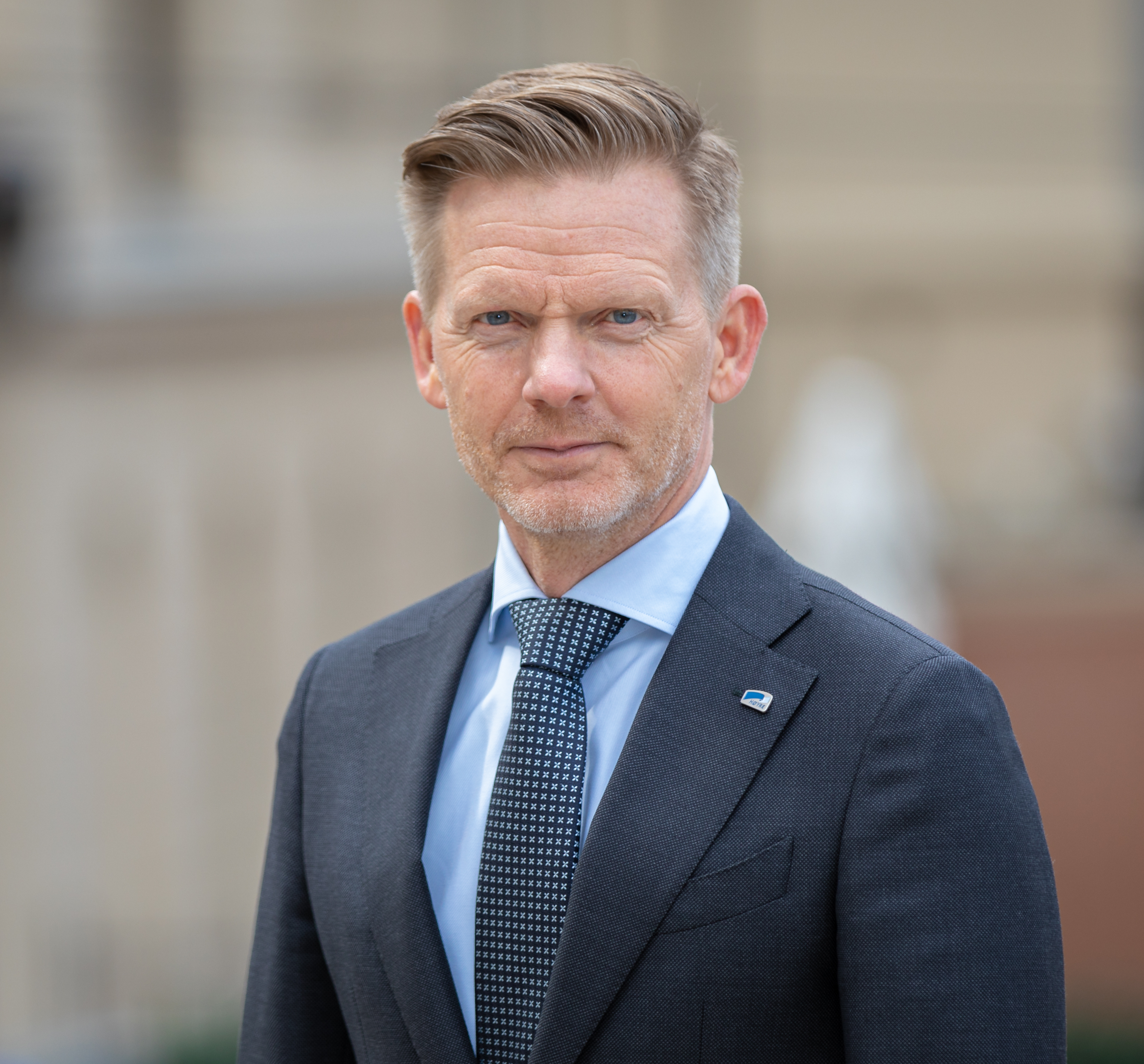

President of the Norwegian Ice Hockey Association
- Incumbent
- Assumed office 9 June 2018
- Preceded by: Gerhard Nilsen

Member of the Storting
- Incumbent
- Assumed office 1 October 2017
- Constituency: Østfold

Mayor of Moss
- In office 17 October 2011 – 25 September 2017
- Deputy: Erlend Wiborg (FrP); Anne Bramo (FrP); Benedicte Lund (MDG)
- Preceded by: Paul-Erik Krogsvold (Ap)
- Succeeded by: Hanne Tollerud (Ap)

Leader of Østfold Conservative Party
- In office 8 March 2008 – 8 March 2016
- Preceded by: Tor Prøitz
- Succeeded by: René Rafshol

Personal details
- Born: 25 July 1972 (age 53)
- Party: Conservative
- Occupation: Politician

Tage Pettersen (born 25 July 1972) is a Norwegian politician. He was elected representative to the Storting from the constituency of Østfold for the period 2017–2021 for the Conservative Party, and re-elected for the period 2021–2025 and 2025–2029.

He is also the former leader of Østfold Conservative Party (2008–2016) and a former mayor of Moss municipality from 2011 and until he was elected to the Storting in 2017.

He was elected as president of the Norwegian Ice Hockey Association in June 2018.
