= Svein Roald Hansen =

Norwegian politician

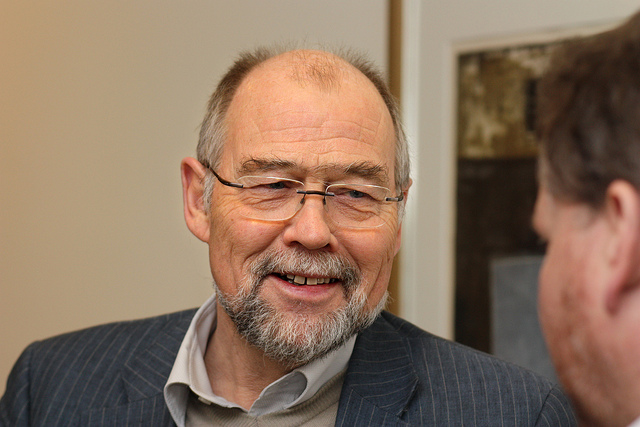
Svein Roald Hansen

Svein Roald Hansen (born 20 August 1949 in Fredrikstad) is a Norwegian politician for the Labour Party.

Before entering politics he worked as a journalist, later being editor-in-chief in Sarpsborg Arbeiderblad 1990–1992. During the second cabinet Brundtland, Hansen was appointed political advisor in the Office of the Prime Minister, having been the personal advisor of Brundtland from 1983. He later, during the third cabinet Brundtland, became a State Secretary in the Office of the Prime Minister from 1992 to 1995.

He was elected to the Norwegian Parliament from Østfold in 2001, and has been re-elected on one occasion.

On the local level he was member of Borge municipal council from 1983 to 1993, then its successor municipality Fredrikstad from 1993 to 2007, serving as mayor from during the term 1995–1999.

He was the president of the Norwegian branch of the European Movement since 2003. In 2009 he was succeeded by Paal Frisvold.
