= Hashim Abdi =

Norwegian politician (born 2004)

Member of the Storting
- Incumbent
- Assumed office 1 October 2025
- Constituency: Østfold

Personal details
- Born: 22 September 2004 (age 22)
- Party: Labour Party

Hashim Mohodin Abdi (born 22 September 2004) is a Norwegian politician who was elected member of the Storting in 2025. He was the chairman of the Workers' Youth League in Østfold.

He was born in Trondheim; he grew up in Fredrikstad.
