= Øystein Hedstrøm =

Norwegian politician

Member of Parliament for Østfold
- In office 11 September 1989 – 12 September 2005

Personal details
- Born: 7 August 1946 (age 79) Moss, Norway
- Party: Progress Party
- Spouse: Britt Huseby Hedstrøm
- Occupation: Politician
- Profession: Dentist

Øystein Hedstrøm (born 7 August 1946) is a Norwegian politician. He was a Member of Parliament from Østfold for the Progress Party from 1989 to 2005, after which he declined renomination.

== Early and personal life ==
Hedstrøm was born in Moss, Norway to workshop owner Åge Willem Hedstrøm (born 1923) from Värmland, Sweden and Astri Thue (born 1921). He is educated a dentist by profession, and is married to cosmetologist Britt Huseby whom he met at a TV Norge dating show called Reisesjekken in 1993. Hedstrøm was in his political career notably characterised by his comb over hair style, and according to a later commentator it even became the "symbol" of the more extreme faction of the Progress Party. In 2007 however, he went to Sweden and had a hair transplant, and accordingly "no longer have the typical comb over" as he commented.

== Political career ==
Hedstrøm joined Anders Lange's Party (which later became the current Progress Party) already in its founding year of 1973. Before joining Anders Lange's Party, he had been a member of the Young Conservatives. Hedstrøm was a Member of Parliament from Østfold from 1989 to 2005, and was one of the most profiled, and controversial, Progress Party politicians during the 1990s.

In 1995, Hedstrøm was behind an infamous proposal in parliament, the so-called "immigration account" (Norwegian: innvandrerregnskap) known as "Document nr. 8:29" (Dokument nr. 8:29). The proposal called for a study by the government on the costs of the asylum, refugee and immigration policy, in addition to demanding the presentation of a parliamentary message about the "long-term consequences and effects on Norwegian society by the growing number of immigrants with a different and foreign culture". It later became known that Hedstrøm had received assistance from a member of the Norwegian League for the document. By May 1995, the 24-page document had been printed in 2,500 copies.

Being noted for his tough stance on immigration, controversy erupted when he was revealed to have held a speech at the 1995 Norwegian League meeting at Godlia kino, resulting in Hedstrøm being stripped of his position as Spokesperson of Immigration Issues for the party. Hedstrøm later said that he felt he had made two mistakes at the meeting; the first to have held a speech, and the second to not have left when he saw who was present there.

After this controversy, he received competition for his candidacy in the nomination for the 1997 election in Østfold. In the end, he won 63-29 against the rather unknown Vigdis Giltun (who was favoured by the nomination committee), and to what was called an "absolute rarity" in Norwegian politics, even a group of pro-Hedstrøm demonstrators showed up outside the nomination meeting, displaying his strong grassroots support.

In 1999 Hedstrøm and his close party colleague Vidar Kleppe arranged several "talk shows" or public meetings critical of immigration, popularly known as the "Hedstrøm & Kleppe Show".

The Østfold chapter of the party had before the 2001 election expressed that they did not want Hedstrøm running as a candidate for the county. But even with the ongoing exclusion of several controversial Progress Party politicians, he remained in the party, won the nomination for Østfold and was elected to parliament for his fourth term. It has been noted that the support for the Progress Party in Østfold in 2002 was more than 10% higher than the national average. In 2004, he however announced that he would not run for reelection.

== Political views ==
In parliament, Hedstrøm was known as a strong critic of the governmental immigration policy, and his statements on the matter garnered both popular praise as well as criticism.

In 1995 he was criticised by some for drawing lines between Samis and immigrants. Hedstrøm criticised the governmental granting of special rights to Samis (in this case concerning reindeerherding, which was also opposed by the Centre, Liberal, Conservative and Progress Party) but also criticised that also immigrants by this in a similar manner could demand special rights in the future. He maintained that the Progress Party rejected any demands of special treatment based on ethnicity.
