= Irene Johansen =

Norwegian politician (born 1961)

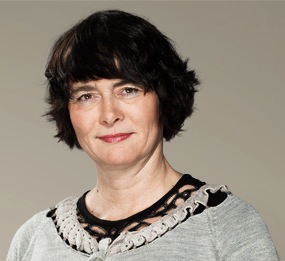
Irene Johansen

Irene Johansen (born 7 January 1961 in Nord-Aurdal Municipality) is a Norwegian politician for the Labour Party.

She was elected to the Norwegian Parliament from Østfold in 2005.

On the local level she was a deputy member of the executive committee of the municipal council for Moss Municipality from 2003 to 2007. She chairs the local party chapter since 2002.

Outside politics she has worked as a secretary in Seljord Municipality, as a consultant in NAVF and Østfold county municipality and as personal director in the Norwegian National Rail Administration.
