= Sverre Gjørwad =

Norwegian politician

Sverre Gjørwad (23 November 1885 – 15 July 1969) was a Norwegian politician for the Conservative Party.

He was born in Kviteseid Municipality. He was elected to the Norwegian Parliament from Østfold in 1950, but was not re-elected in 1954. Instead he served in the position of deputy representative during the term 1954–1957.

Gjørwad was a member of the executive committee of the municipal council in Tune Municipality between 1947 and 1955.
