= Kjerstin Wøyen Funderud =

Norwegian politician

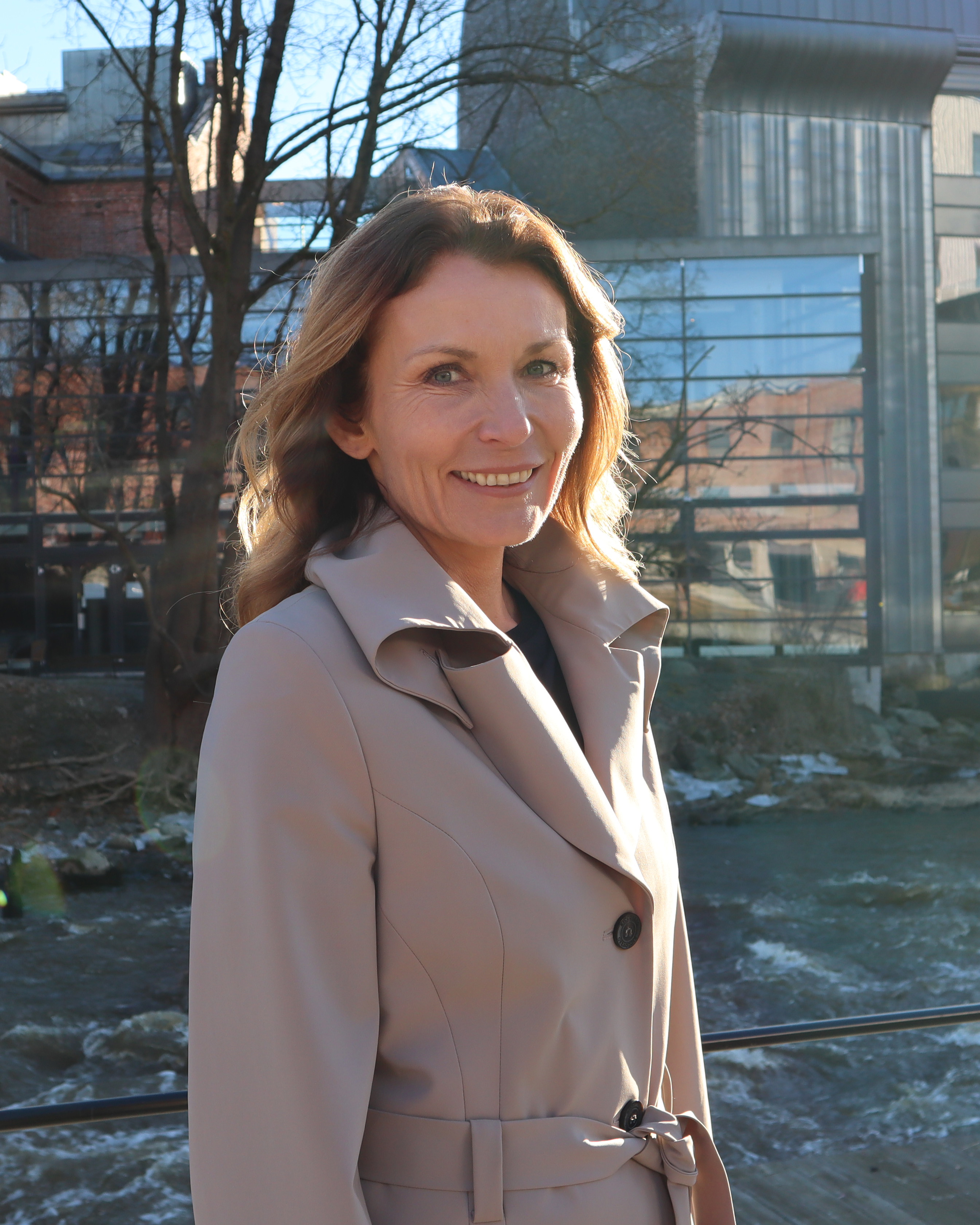

Member of the Storting
- In office 1 October 2021 – 30 September 2025
- Constituency: Østfold

Mayor of Våler municipality
- In office 2007–2011
- Deputy: Lena Christin Risan (H)
- Preceded by: Torbjørn Meyer (Sp)
- Succeeded by: Reidar Kaabbel (Sp)

Personal details
- Born: 13 November 1970 (age 55)
- Party: Centre
- Occupation: Politician

Kjerstin Wøyen Funderud (born 13 November 1970) is a Norwegian politician.

== Political career ==
Funderud was elected representative to the Storting from the constituency of Østfold for the period 2021–2025, for the Centre Party. In the Storting, she was a member of the Standing Committee on Finance and Economic Affairs from 2021 to February 2025, and of the Standing Committee on Education and Research from February 2025.

Funderud served as mayor in Våler from 2007 to 2011.
