= Johannes Olav Bergersen =

Norwegian farmer and politician

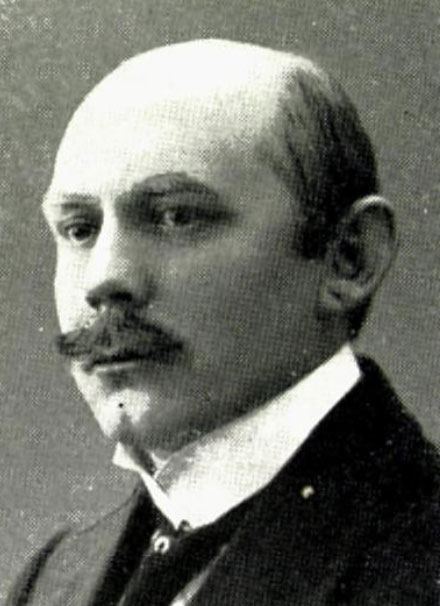
Johannes Olav Bergersen

Johannes Olav Bergersen (24 June 1874 – 19 April 1936) was a Norwegian trade unionist and politician for the Labour and Social Democratic Labour parties.

== Biography ==
He was born in Glemminge. He started his working career already at age 7, when he became a herder. He moved to Borge, Østfold at the age of 12 and was employed at Fredrikstad Dampsag og Høvleri until 1907.

Bergersen was a board member of the Norwegian Union of General Workers from 1908 to 1912, and of the Norwegian Confederation of Trade Unions from 1912. After he was able to leave his job as a sawmill worker in 1907, he was employed as a travelling agitator for four years. From 1911 to 1917 he worked as managing director of the sickness fund in Borge and a liaison for Rikstrygdeverket. He was an auditor from 1918 to his death.

He served as a member of Borge municipal council from 1904 to 1928, including a period as deputy mayor from 1908 to 1910 and mayor from 1923 to 1928. He returned to serve as mayor again from 1932 to 1934.

In national politics, Bergersen was elected to the Parliament of Norway from the single-member constituency Glemminge in 1912 and 1915. In 1918, he won the first round, but not with a large enough margin. There had to be a run-off election between Bergersen and Conservative candidate Ivar Berntsen, where Bergersen managed to rally more voters and increase from 2,792 to 3,197 votes, but Berntsen surpassed him, having got 2,776 votes in the first round and 3,375 in the second. By 1921, plural-member constituencies was reintroduced in Norway, and Bergersen was elected in 1921, 1924, 1927, 1930 and 1933. Having been a member of the Lagting for his first two terms, Bergersen served as President of the Odelsting in 1928–30 and 1934–35 (as well as vice president in 1927 and 1931–33). He chaired the Standing Committee on Social Affairs from 1926 to 1936. He died before the end of his last term, in April 1936 in Fredrikstad. His empty seat was taken by deputy Emil Andersen.

Bergersen also held multiple memberships of public boards and commissions, as well as business boards such as Glomma Sagbruk og Høvleri, Ofoten Malmfelter and the supervisory council of Fredrikstad Mekaniske Verksted.
