= Wenche Lyngholm =

Norwegian politician (born 1951)

Wenche Lyngholm (born 13 May 1951 in Moss) is a Norwegian politician for the Socialist Left Party.

She was elected to the Norwegian Parliament from Østfold in 1989, but was not re-elected in 1993.

When the Socialist Left Party entered the Cabinet in 2005, Lyngholm was appointed State Secretary in the Ministry of Government Administration and Reform.
