= Thorbjørn Kultorp =

Norwegian politician

Thorbjørn Kultorp (19 October 1929, in Skjeberg – 25 April 2004) was a Norwegian politician for the Labour Party.

He was elected to the Norwegian Parliament from Østfold in 1969, and was re-elected on two occasions.

On the local level he was a member of Skjeberg municipality council from 1959 to 1971, serving as deputy mayor from 1963 to 1967. From 1967 to 1971 he was also a member of Østfold county council.
