= Magnus Johansen =

Norwegian politician

Magnus Johansen (1 December 1886 – 23 September 1970) was a Norwegian politician for the Labour Party.

He was born in Drammen.

He was elected to the Norwegian Parliament from Østfold in 1937, and was re-elected on one occasion. He had previously served in the position of deputy representative during the terms 1928–1930 and 1934–1936.

Arntzen was a member of the executive committee of Tune municipality council from 1913 to 1940 and of the municipality council from 1963 to 1967.
