= Ingvar Bakken =

Norwegian politician (1920–1982)

Ingvar Bakken (22 July 1920 – 27 June 1982) was a Norwegian politician for the Labour Party.

He was born in Øymark, Norway (modern day Marker), on July 22, 1920.

He was first elected to the Norwegian Parliament from Østfold in 1958, and was re-elected six times until his death in 1982. He had previously been a deputy representative from 1954–1957.

Bakken was mayor of Øymark municipality from 1947–1963 and its successor municipality Marker from 1963–1967.
