= Line Henriette Holten Hjemdal =

Norwegian politician (born 1971)

Line Henriette Holten
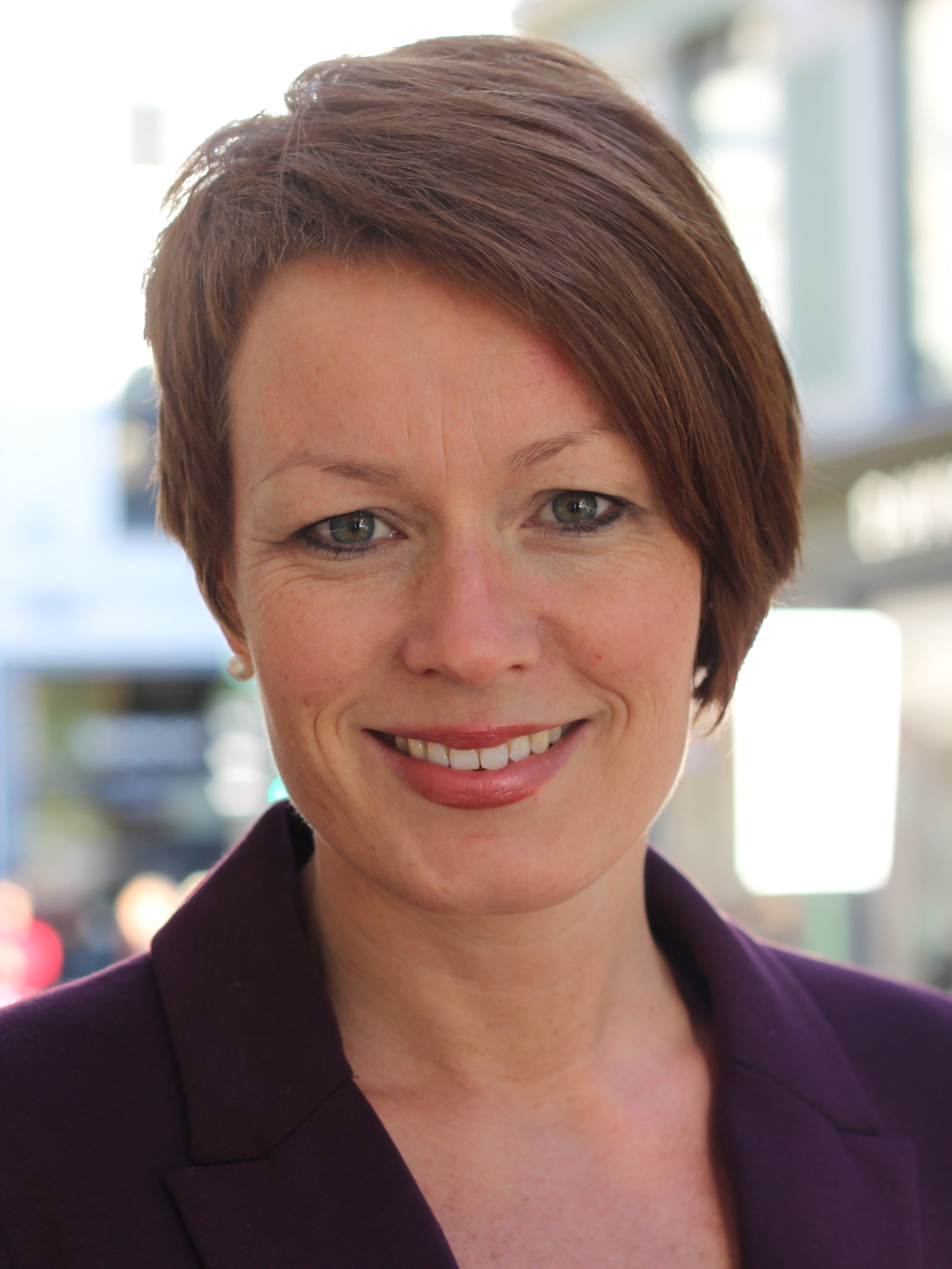
- Hjemdal in 2012.

Fifth Vice President of the Storting
- In office 8 October 2013 – 30 September 2017
- President: Olemic Thommessen
- Preceded by: Dagfinn Høybråten
- Succeeded by: Abid Raja
- In office 8 October 2009 – 30 September 2011
- President: Dag Terje Andersen
- Preceded by: Position established
- Succeeded by: Dagfinn Høybråten

Member of the Norwegian Parliament
- In office 1 October 2005 – 30 September 2017
- Constituency: Østfold

Personal details
- Born: Lind Henriette Hjemdal; 18 October 1971 (age 54) Sarpsborg, Norway
- Party: Christian Democratic

Line Henriette Holten Hjemdal (born 18 October 1971 in Sarpsborg) is a Norwegian politician for the Christian Democratic Party and former 5th Vice President of the Storting.

Holten Hjemdal was the vice leader of the Youth of the Christian People's Party in 1991–1993, and general secretary of the organization in 1997–2000. During the second cabinet Bondevik, Holten Hjemdal worked as a political advisor in the Ministry of Health and Care Services (2001–2004) and the Ministry of Labour and Social Affairs (2004–2005)

Holten Hjemdal was a member of Askim city council during the term 2003–2007, and a deputy member of Østfold county council in 1991–1995.

She was elected to the Norwegian Parliament from Østfold in 2005. Her father Odd Holten had held the seat from 1989 to 2005.
