= Sigurd Holemark =

Norwegian politician (1934–2004)

- Born: 8 September 1934; Norderhov, Norway
- Died: 12 August 2004 (aged 69)
- Occupation: Politician
- Political party: Conservative

Sigurd Holemark (8 September 1934 in Norderhov – 12 August 2004) was a Norwegian politician for the Conservative Party (Høyre). He was a member of the Parliament of Norway from 1981 to 1993, representing Østfold.

== See also ==
- Politics of Norway
