= Johan Undrum =

Norwegian politician

- Born: 7 October 1880; Vaale Municipality, Norway
- Died: 14 March 1940 (aged 59)
- Occupation: Politician

Johan Undrum (7 October 1880 – 14 March 1940) was a Norwegian politician.

He was born in Vaale Municipality to Christian Gerhard Undrum and Hanna Mathilde Olsen. He was elected representative to the Storting for several periods, 1931–1945, for the Conservative Party.
