= Henrik Rød =

Norwegian politician (born 1975)

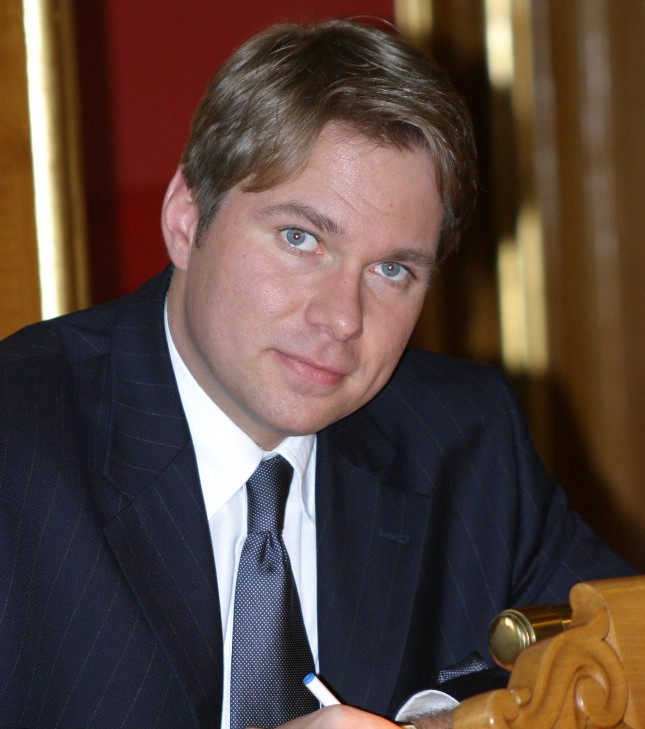
Henrik Rød in November 2007

Henrik Rød (born 14 September 1975 in Halden) is a Norwegian politician for the Progress Party.

He was elected to the Norwegian Parliament from Østfold in 2001, but was not re-elected in 2005. Instead he serves as a deputy representative during the term 2005–2009.

Rød was a member of the executive committee of Halden city council during the terms 1995–1999 and 1999–2003.
