= Klara Amalie Skoglund =

Norwegian politician

Klara Amalie Skoglund (22 September 1891 – 8 May 1978) was a Norwegian politician for the Labour Party.

She was born in Oslo.

She was elected to the Norwegian Parliament from Østfold in 1945, and was re-elected on two occasions. She had previously served in the position of deputy representative during the term 1937–1945.
