= Arthur Arntzen (politician) =

Norwegian civil servant and politician

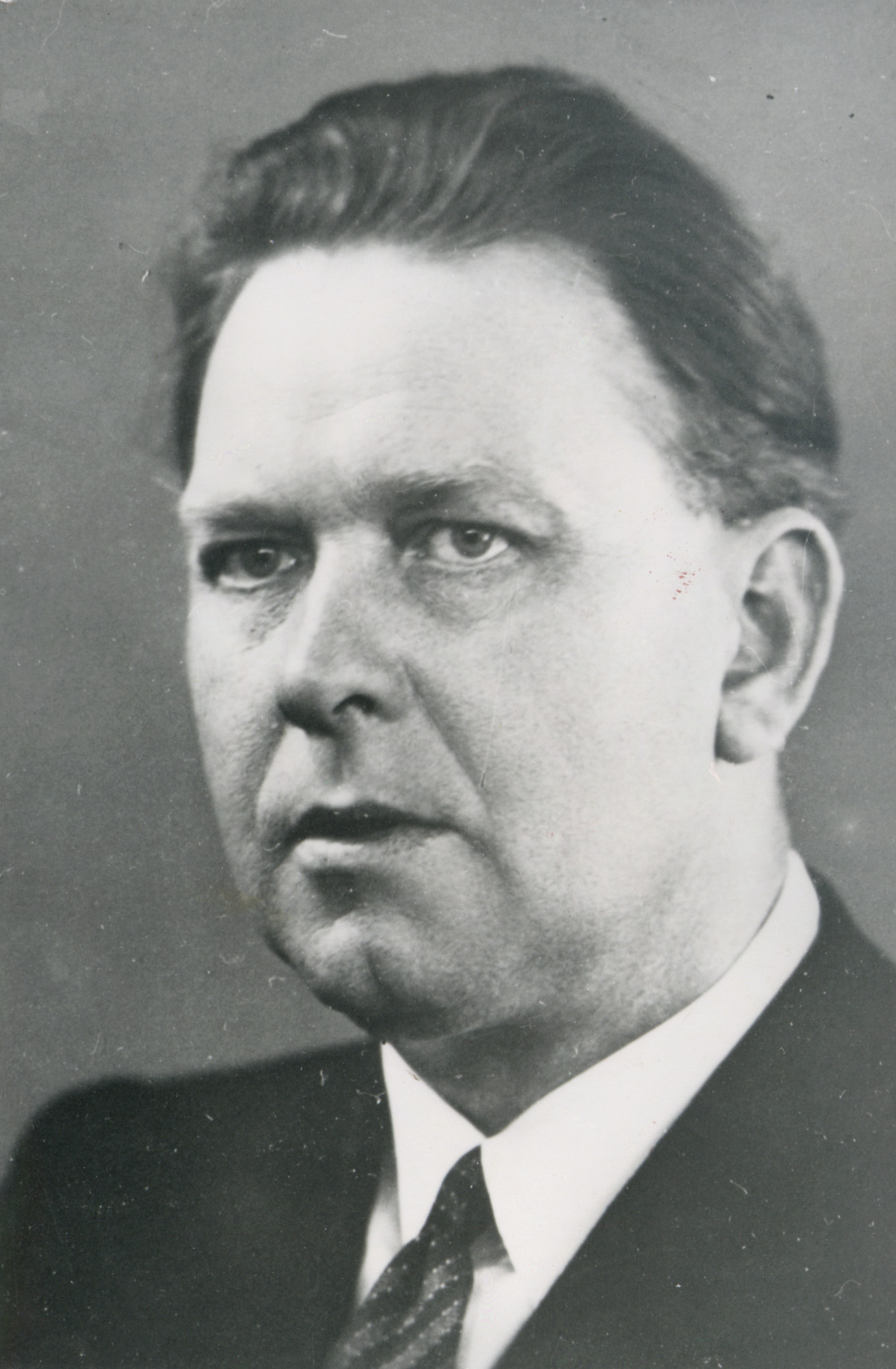
Image of Arthur Arntzen

Arthur Arntzen (29 April 1906 – 28 March 1997) was a Norwegian civil servant and politician for the Labour Party.

He was born in Borge, Østfold. He worked in the insurance company Norske Folk from 1926 to 1927, then as treasurer at Glomma Sagbruk og Høvleri in Fredrikstad from 1929 to 1936 and as auditor and treasurer's assistant in Borge municipality from 1935 to 1937. From 1937 to 1958 he was the head treasurer, and from 1958 to 1972 he was an office manager.

Arntzen entered politics as a national board member of the Workers' Youth League from 1931 to 1939 and 1945 to 1946. He was a member of the Borge municipal council from 1934 to 1937 and from 1947 to 1958, serving as mayor from 1955 to 1958. He chaired the regional party chapter from 1948 to 1954, and was a member of the national party board from 1949 to 1953. He served as a deputy representative to the Parliament of Norway from Østfold during the term 1937–1945, was elected in 1945, and was re-elected on two occasions in 1949 and 1953. He was a member of the Standing Committee on Finance and Customs for all his three terms, and a member of the Election Committee for his last two terms.

From 1950 to 1964 Arntzen was a deputy representative to the Office of the Auditor General of Norway. He was a board member of the Norwegian State Housing Bank from 1951 to 1954, and a member of its control committee from 1955 to 1974. He was active in the International Organisation of Good Templars and in the trade union Norwegian Union of Municipal Employees.
