= Gunder Anton Johannesen Jahren =

Norwegian politician

Gunder Anton Jahren
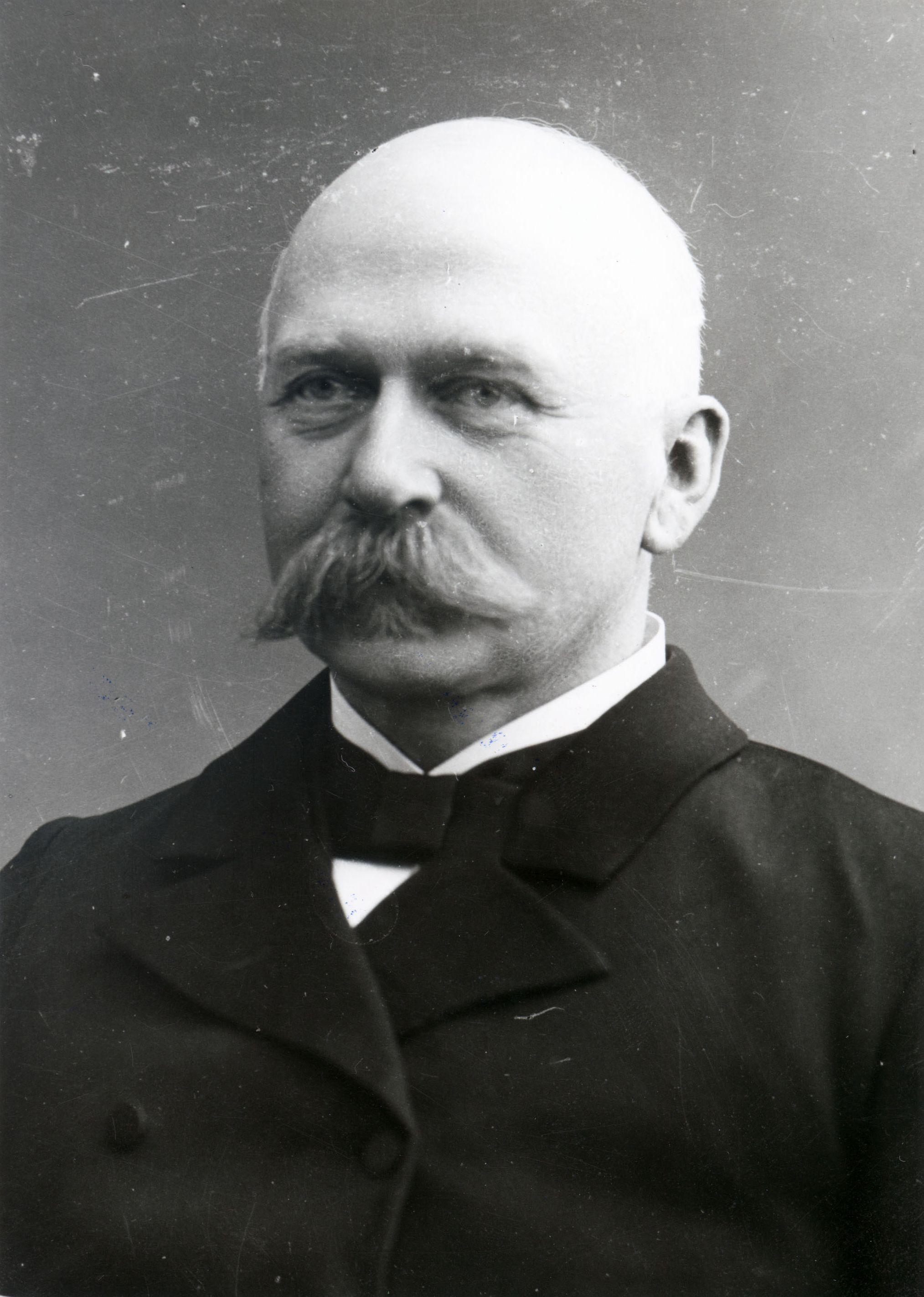
- Parliamentary portrait of Jahren.

Minister of Agriculture
- In office 21 June 1920 – 22 June 1921
- Prime Minister: Otto B. Halvorsen
- Preceded by: Håkon Five
- Succeeded by: Martin Olsen Nalum

President of the Storting
- In office 1 January 1925 – 31 December 1927 Serving with Ivar Lykke and C. J. Hambro
- Prime Minister: J. L. Mowinckel; Ivar Lykke
- Preceded by: Ivar Lykke; Otto B. Halvorsen
- Succeeded by: C. J. Hambro

President of the Lagting
- In office 1 January 1922 – 31 December 1926
- Preceded by: Magnus Nilssen
- Succeeded by: Helge Nilsen Thune
- In office 1 January 1909 – 31 December 1912
- Preceded by: Thore Torkildsen Foss
- Succeeded by: Andreas Andersen Grimsø

Personal details
- Born: Gunder Anton Johannessen Jahren; 8 August 1858 Rakkestad, Østfold, United Kingdoms of Sweden and Norway
- Died: 20 May 1933 (aged 74) Oslo, Norway
- Party: Conservative
- Spouse: Lisa Georgine Hansdatter Bjørneby (m. 1888)
- Children: Several (uncertain how many)

Gunder Anton Johannesen Jahren (8 August 1858 – 20 May 1933) was a Norwegian politician for the Conservative Party. He was Minister of Agriculture 1920–1921. He also represented Østfold in the Norwegian Parliament from 1903 to 1930, and became president of the legislature in 1925.
