= Otto Hauglin =

Norwegian politician

- Born: 7 February 1942; Fredrikstad
- Died: 18 November 2012 (aged 70); Oslo
- Occupations: Sociologist and politician
- Political party: Socialist Left Party

Otto Hauglin (7 February 1942 – 18 November 2012) was a Norwegian sociologist and politician for the Socialist Left Party (SV). He was an elected member of the Parliament of Norway from 1973 to 1977, representing Østfold county.

== Personal life ==
Hauglin was born in Fredrikstad, a son of industrial worker Jens Einar Hauglin and Else Helene Lundheim.

He died in Oslo in November 2012.

== Selected works ==
- Rapport fra Nærby (1970).
