= Signe Øye =

Norwegian politician

Signe Øye (born 2 June 1945 in Nord-Aukra) is a Norwegian politician for the Labour Party.

She was elected to the Norwegian Parliament from Østfold in 1993, and was re-elected on three occasions.

On the local level she was a member of Hobøl municipal council from 1983 to 1990. She chaired the local party chapter from 1994 to 2000, and the regional chapter since 2002.

Outside politics she worked as a secretary in Spydeberg municipality from 1974 to 1990, and as a consultant in Hobøl municipality from 1990 to 1993.
