= Ane Sofie Tømmerås =

Norwegian politician (born 1966)

Ane Sofie Tømmerås (born 18 February 1966, in Halden) is a Norwegian politician for the Labour Party.

She was elected to the Norwegian Parliament from Østfold in 1993, and was re-elected on one occasion. She later served in the position of deputy representative during the term 2001–2005.
