= Bente Bakke =

Norwegian politician (born 1942)

Bente Bakke (born 13 November 1942) is a Norwegian politician. She was a two-term MP for the Conservative Party. September 14, 2015 she was elected as member of the municipal council in Vestby, representing the Green Party.

== Career ==
She was born in Oslo as a daughter of shipbroker Rolv Dahl-Jørgensen (1904–1980) and housewife Ragnhild Bjørneby (1908–2003). She was a paternal granddaughter of politician Erling Jørgensen. She finished secondary school in 1961 and Oslo Commerce School in 1962, and worked as a secretary in Oslo, London and Mysen. She was a journalist in Østfold Bygdeblad from 1980 to 1981 and edited the magazine KFB-bladet from 1991 to 2001.

From 1973 she was a member of the New People's Party for one year. She then joined the Conservative Party in 1974. She was a member of Eidsberg municipal council from 1975 to 1979, and chaired the local party chapter from 1978 to 1979. She served as a deputy representative to the Parliament of Norway from Østfold during the term 1981–1985, but during the entire term she filled in for Svenn Stray who was a cabinet member. She was elected as a full representative in 1985, and sat through the four-year term. In 1990 she released her memoirs from Parliament.

She was a supervisory council member of the Norwegian Cancer Society from 1990 to 1995 and a member of Statens kulturminneråd from 1991 to 1996. In 2011 she left the Conservative Party and joined the Green Party. She is also active in the campaigns to stop Statoil's tar sand projects in Canada. She resides in Vestby.
