= May Hansen =

Norwegian politician (born 1953)

May Hansen (born 8 May 1953) is a Norwegian politician for the Socialist Left Party.

Born in Fredrikstad, Hansen was elected to the Norwegian Parliament from Østfold in 2001, and has been re-elected on one occasion.

On the local level she was a member of the executive committee of Moss municipal council from 1991 to 2003. From 1989 to 1993 she was a member of Østfold county council.

Outside politics she worked as a midwife.
