= Peter Olai Thorvik =

Norwegian blacksmith, fisherman, banker and politician

- Born: 2 July 1873; Volda, Norway
- Died: 16 August 1965 (aged 92)
- Occupation: Politician

Peter Olai Thorvik (2 July 1873 – 16 August 1965) was a Norwegian blacksmith, fisherman, banker and politician.

== Biography ==
Thorvik was born in Volda Municipality on 2 July 1873, to Sivert Peter Andersen Thorvik and Berthe Johanne Olsdatter Brune. He married Gunde Marie Johnsen in 1905. He was elected representative to the Storting for several periods, 1922–1945, for the Labour Party.
