= Thor Erik Forsberg =

Norwegian politician (born 1980)

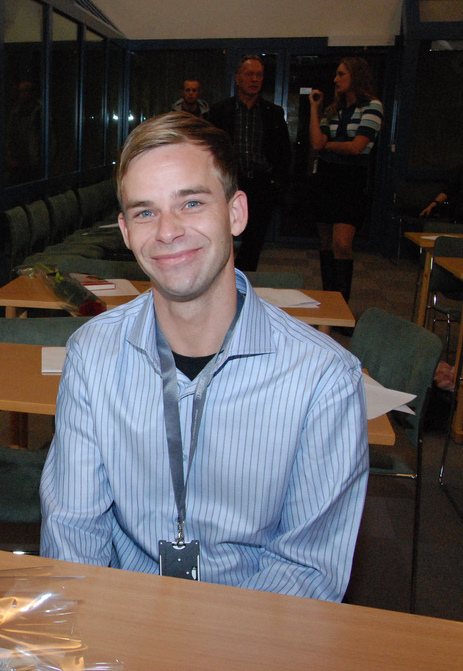
Thor Erik Forsberg

Thor Erik Forsberg (born 2 April 1980) is a Norwegian politician for the Labour Party.

He was a member of the Norwegian Parliament from Østfold during the term 2009–2013.

He hails from Sarpsborg.
