= Martha Frederikke Johannessen =

Norwegian politician

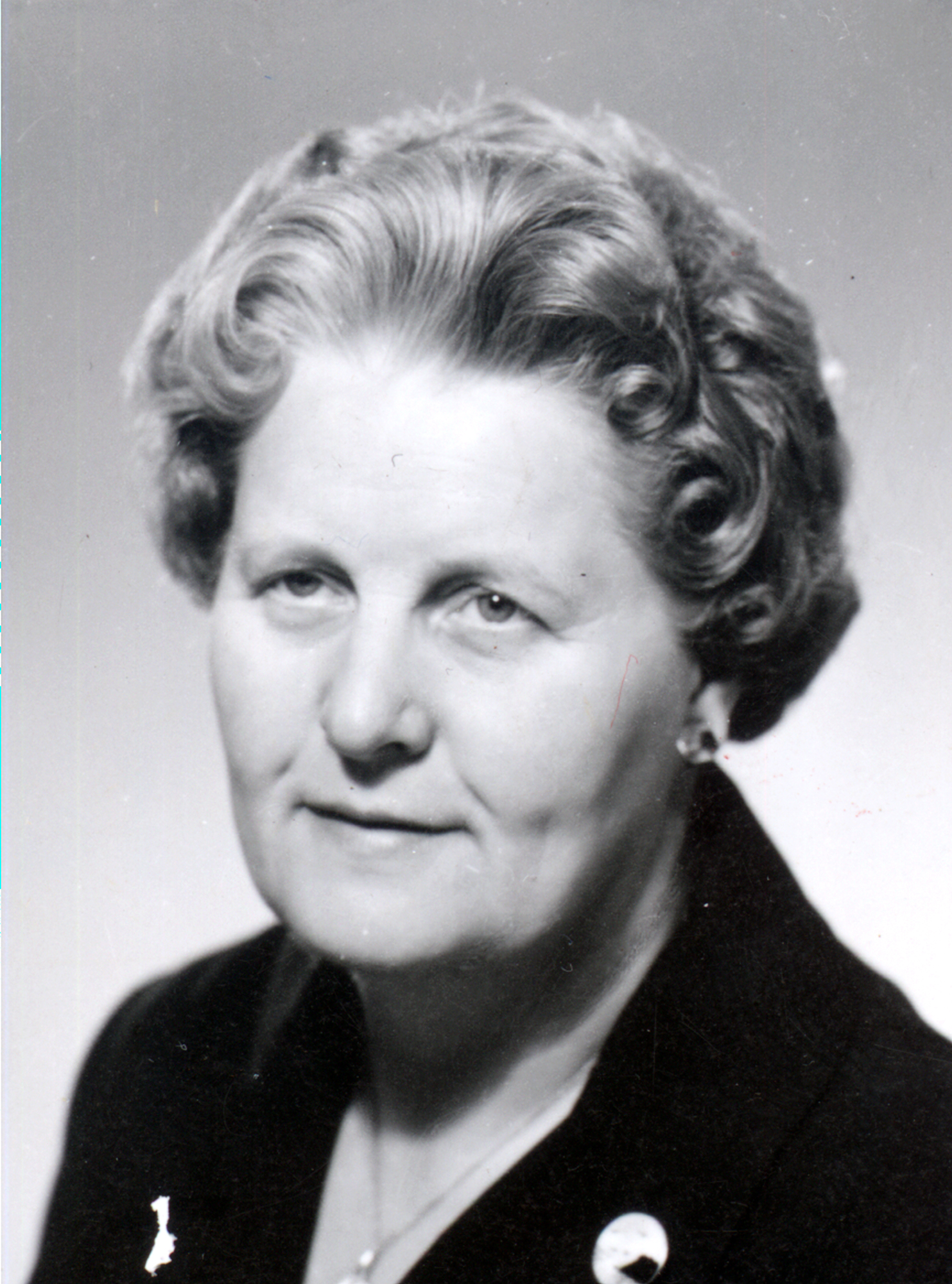
Martha Johannessen

Martha Frederikke Johannessen (26 October 1907 – 4 September 1973) was a Norwegian politician for the Labour Party.

She was born in Borge, Østfold.

She was elected to the Norwegian Parliament from Østfold in 1958, was re-elected three times and sat until her death in 1973. She had previously been a deputy representative from 1954–1957.

Johannessen was deputy mayor of Torsnes municipality during the terms 1955–1959 and 1959–1963.
