= Reidun Andreassen =

Norwegian politician (1936–2026)

- Born: 15 June 1936; Oslo, Norway
- Died: 9 August 2026 (aged 90); Sarpsborg, Norway
- Occupation: Politician
- Political party: Labour Party

Reidun Andreassen (15 June 1936 – 9 August 2026) was a Norwegian Labour Party politician. She was a member of the Storting from 1985 to 1989.

== Life and career ==
Andreassen was born on 15 June 1936 in Oslo to Arne Throndsen and Agnes Otilie Bakke. She was elected representative to the Storting for the period 1985–1989 for the Labour Party, from the constituency of Østfold. From 1989 to 1993 she was elected first deputy from Østfold for the Labour Party.

In the Storting, she was a member of Forbruker- og administrasjonskomiteen from 1985 to 1986, and of the Standing Committee on Justice from 1986 to 1989.

Andreassen died on 9 August 2026, at the age of 90.
