= Asbjørn Solberg =

Norwegian politician

Asbjørn Solberg (27 December 1893 – 23 June 1977) was a Norwegian politician for the Christian Democratic Party.

He was born in Oslo.

He was elected to the Norwegian Parliament from Østfold in 1945, and was re-elected on three occasions. He later served in the position of deputy representative during the term 1961–1965.

Solberg was a member of Degernes municipality council between 1945 and 1947, serving as mayor in 1945. In 1945 he was also a member of Østfold county council.
