= Wilhelm Engel Bredal =

Norwegian politician (1907–1966)

Wilhelm Engel Bredal (25 August 1907 – 26 March 1966) was a Norwegian politician for the Farmers' Party.

He was born in Oslo.

He was elected to the Norwegian Parliament from Østfold in 1945, and was re-elected on two occasions.

Bredal was a member of Rygge municipality council between 1947 and 1951.
