= Tom Thoresen =

Norwegian politician

Tom Thoresen (born 16 May 1947 in Glemmen) is a Norwegian politician for the Labour Party.

He was elected to the Norwegian Parliament from Østfold in 1977, and was re-elected on five occasions.

On the local level Thoresen was a member of Fredrikstad city council from 1971 to 1987.

Outside politics he graduated as candidatus philologiae in 1974 and worked one year as a high school teacher. From 1983 to 1987 he was deputy leader of the now-defunct government agency Likestillingsrådet. In 2002 he was appointed director of Statens Medieforvaltning, which was merged with other institutions in 2005 to become the Norwegian Media Authority. Thoresen continued as director.

Preceded by position created	Director of the Norwegian Media Authority; 2005–present	Incumbent
