= Gunnar Skaug =

Norwegian politician

Gunnar Skaug (25 May 1940 - 23 June 2006) was a Norwegian politician for the Labour Party (Ap). Born in Sarpsborg, Skaug was elected to the Norwegian Parliament from Østfold in 1969, and was president of the Odelsting from 1993 to 2001. He sat the term from 1973 to 1977 as a deputy representative.

== Parliamentary Presidium ==
- 1997–2001 president of the Odelsting
- 1993–1997 president of the Odelsting
- 2 October 1972 – 30 September 1973 secretary in the Storting
- 1 October 1971 – 1 October 1972 vice secretary in the Storting
