= Karl Henry Karlsen =

Norwegian politician

Karl Henry Karlsen (10 November 1893 – 15 February 1979) was a Norwegian politician for the Labour Party.

He was elected to the Norwegian Parliament from Østfold in 1954, but was not re-elected in 1958. He had previously served as a deputy representative during the term 1950–1953, but sat through most of this term as a regular representative, replacing Anton Berge who died in July 1951.

Born in Fredrikshald, Karlsen was a member of the executive committee of Tune municipal council between 1925 and 1937, and served as mayor from 1937 to 1941 and 1945 to 1971. He chaired the local party chapter from 1923 to 1926. He was also a long-time member of Østfold county council.

Outside politics he had education from 1912 as a mechanic. From 1930 to 1963 he was the manager of Greåker Cellulosefabrik, a cellulose factory at Greåker. He was involved in his trade union, and was also especially concerned about the fight against tuberculosis.
