= Martin Engeset =

Norwegian politician

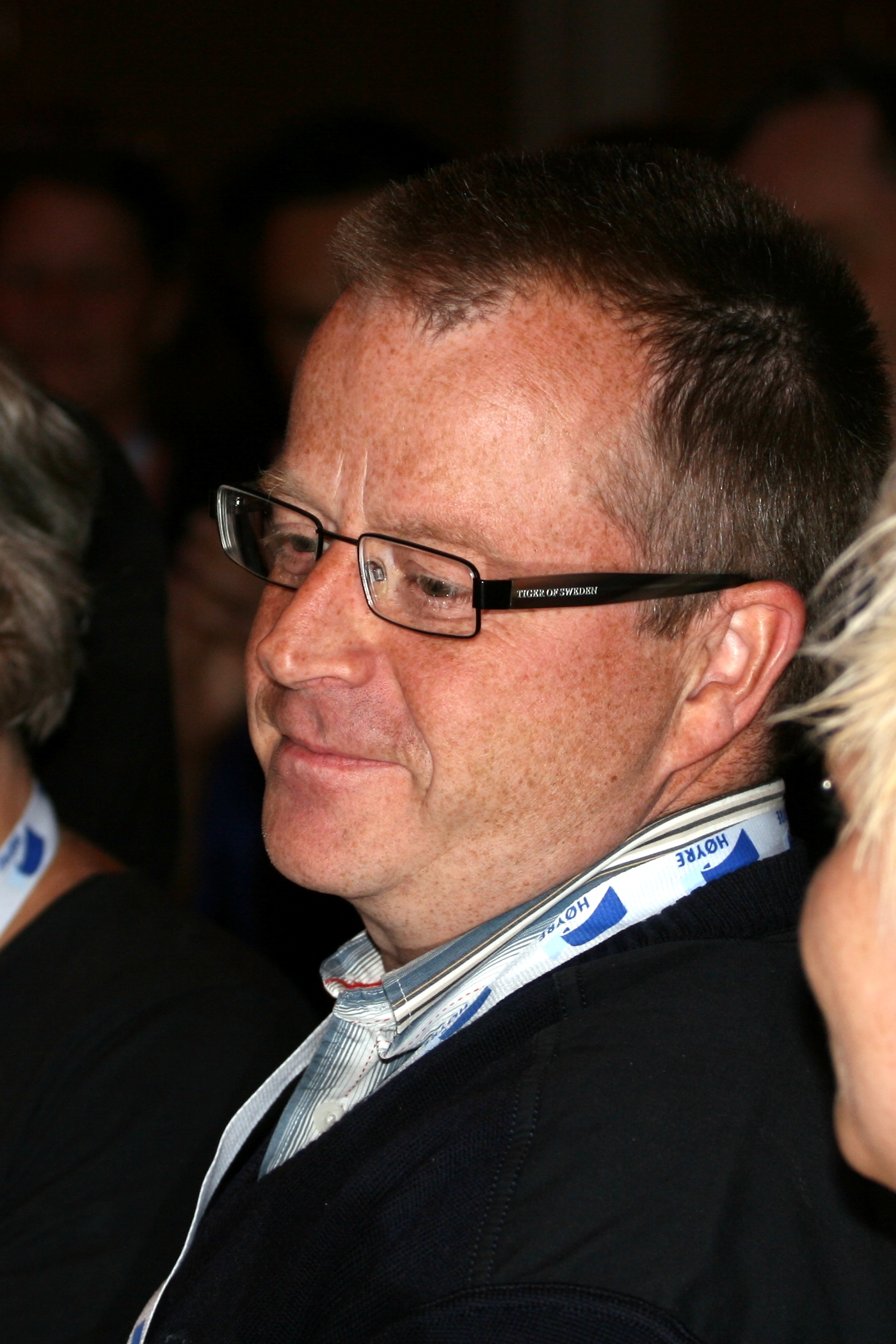
Martin Engeset

Martin Engeset (born 20 July 1964 in Oslo) is a Norwegian politician for the Conservative Party.

He was elected to the Norwegian Parliament from Østfold in 2001, and has been re-elected on one occasion. He had previously served in the position of deputy representative during the terms 1985–1989 and 1993–1997.

From 1983 to 2001 he was a member of Østfold county council. He chaired the county party chapter from 1990 to 2000, and was a member of the Conservative Party central board in the same period.

He has education from the BI School of Management.
