= Odd Holten =

Norwegian politician (1940–2026)

Odd Holten (28 August 1940 – 14 March 2026) was a Norwegian politician for the Christian Democratic Party.

== Life and career ==
Holten was born in Øre on 28 August 1940. He was elected to the Norwegian Parliament from Østfold in 1989 and was re-elected on three occasions. Holten was President of the Lagting 1997–2001. His daughter Line Henriette Holten Hjemdal was elected in 2005.

He was a member of the executive committee of Fredrikstad city council from 1975 to 1989. In 1983–1987, he was also a member of Østfold county council.

Holten died on 14 March 2026, at the age of 85.

== Sources ==
- "Odd Holten" (in Norwegian). Storting.
