= Vigdis Giltun =

Norwegian politician (born 1952)

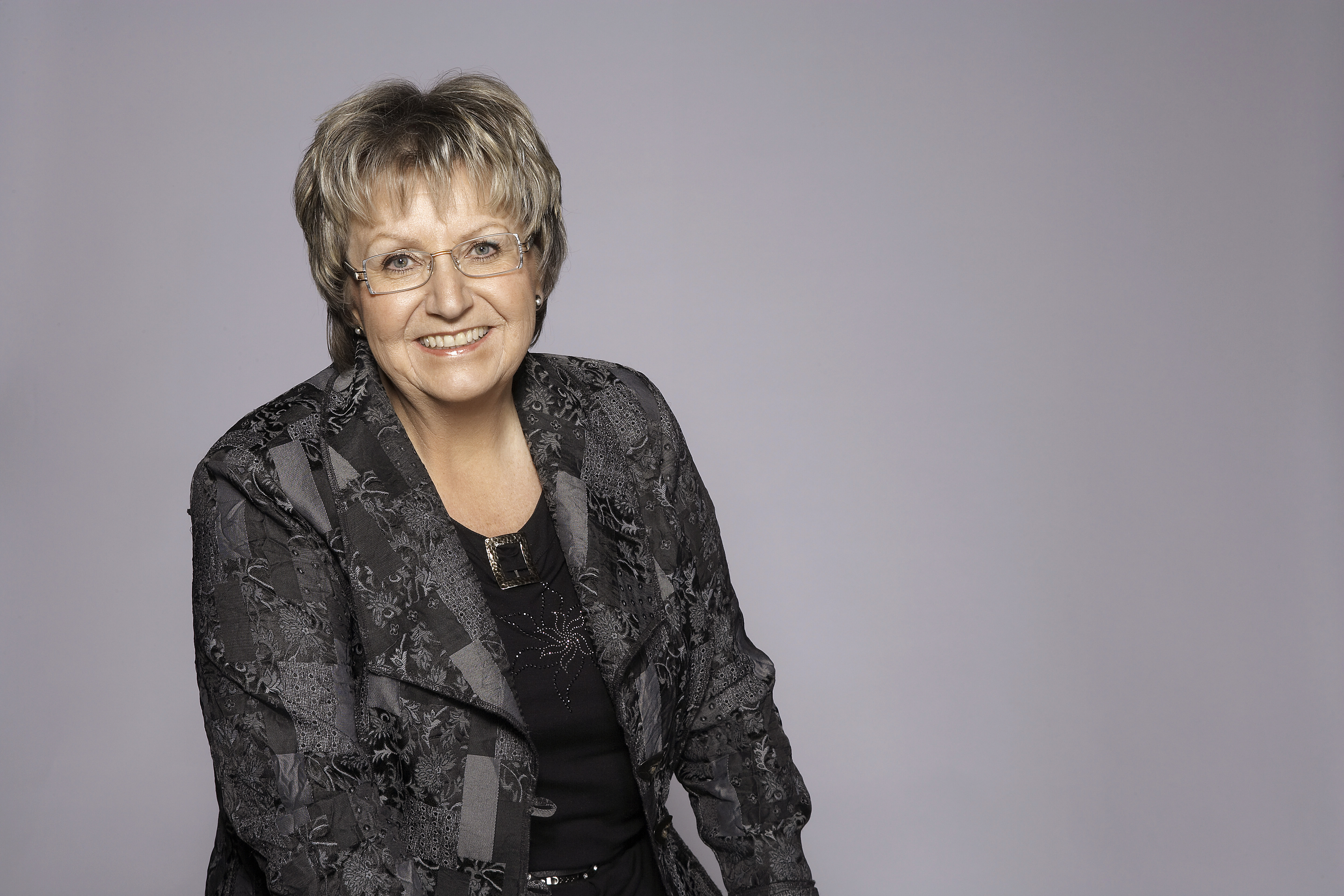
Vigdis Giltun

Vigdis Karen Giltun (born 11 March 1952 in Oslo) is a Norwegian politician for the Progress Party.

She was elected to the Norwegian Parliament from Østfold in 2005.

Giltun held various positions in Fredrikstad municipality council from 1999 to 2007. Before this she was a deputy member.
