= Borge, Østfold =

Former municipality in Østfold, Norway

Coordinates: 59.2278°N 11.0433°E

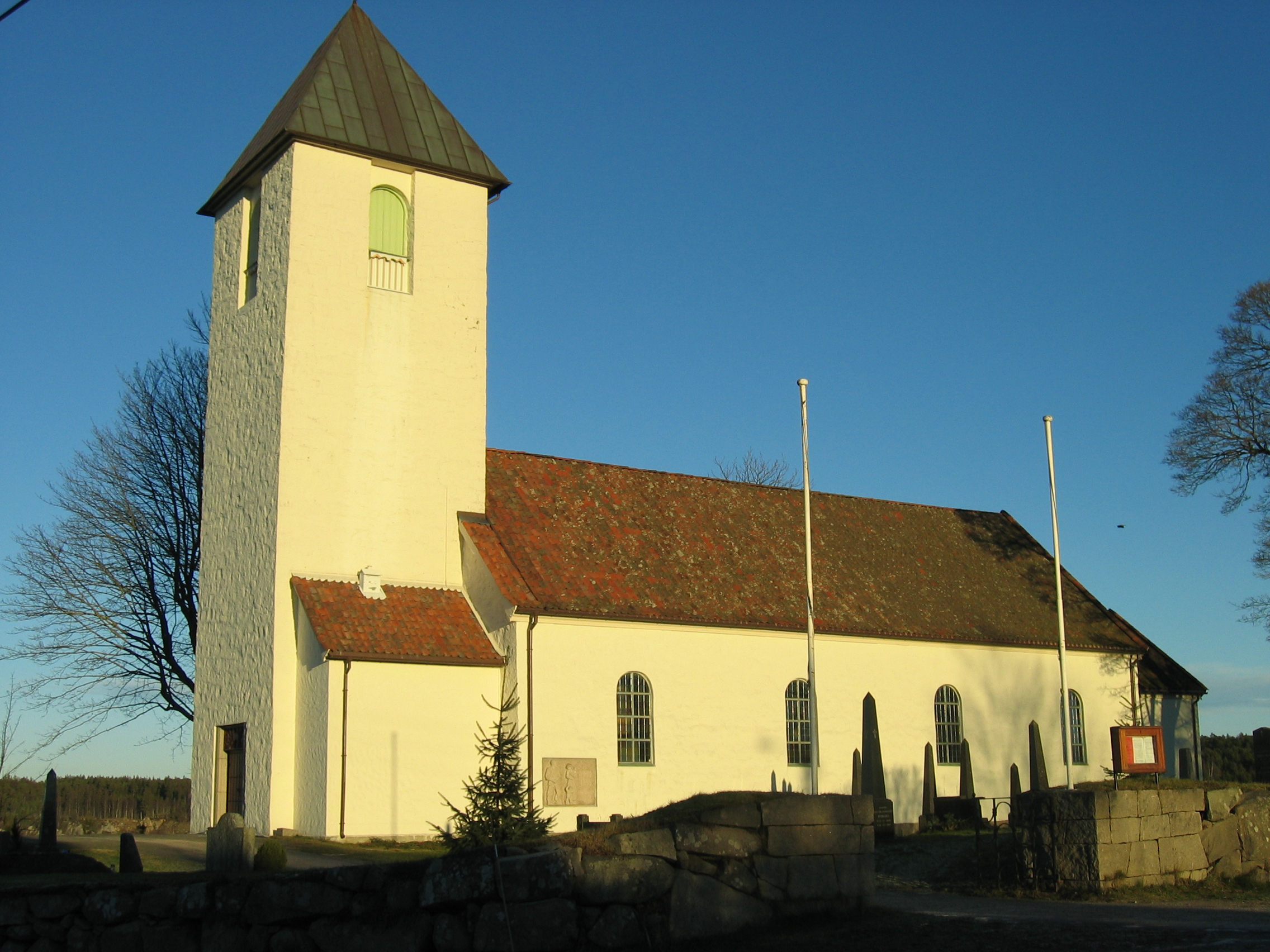
Borge Church

Borge is a parish and former municipality in Østfold county, Norway. Today it is located in the northeast part of Fredrikstad municipality, near the border with Sarpsborg.

== History ==
The parish of Borge was established as a municipality 1 January 1838 (see formannskapsdistrikt). The district of Torsnes was separated from Borge as a municipality of its own 1 January 1910. The split left Borge with a population of 6,466. In 1951 a part of Borge with 53 inhabitants was moved to Fredrikstad municipality, and on 1 January 1964 the properties Gansrød and Ulfeng with 30 inhabitants followed the same way whereas the majority of Torsnes was reunited with Borge. After the merger Borge had a population of 9,219. The rest of Borge (together with Kråkerøy, Onsøy and Rolvsøy) was merged with the city of Fredrikstad 1 January 1994. Prior to the merger Borge had a population of 11,959.

Borge Church (Borge Kirke) was built in 1861. It was built of stone and has 270 seats. The church was restored during 1950. The first church built on the site was dedicated to St. Olav. Churches at this site have burned several times.

== The name ==
The municipality (originally the parish) was named after the farm Borge (Norse Borgar), since the first church was built on its ground. The name is the plural form of borg 'hill fort'. However, the remains of such a fort is not known in the area.

Roald Amundsen, polar explorer, was born in Borge.

== Other sources ==
- Dag Jukvam / Statistics Norway (1999). "Historisk oversikt over endringer i kommune- og fylkesinndelingen" (PDF). Archived (PDF) from the original on 2003-03-10.
