= List of members of the Storting, 1945–1949 =

This is a list of the members of the Storting in the period 1945 to 1949. The list includes all those initially elected to the Storting.

There were a total of 150 representatives, distributed among the parties: 76 from the Norwegian Labour Party, 25 from the Conservative Party, 20 from the Liberal Party, 11 from the Communist Party of Norway, 10 from the Farmer’s Party and 8 from the Christian Democratic Party.

== Aust-Agder ==
Navn	parti	Comments/supleant representatives
Aani Aanisson Rysstad	Norwegian Labour Party	
Anders Tjøstolvsen Noddeland	Liberal Party	
Olav Kjetilson Nylund	Norwegian Labour Party	
Søren Hans Smith Sørensen	Conservative Party	

== Vest-Agder ==
Navn	parti	Comments/supleant representatives
Karl Johan Fjermeros	Liberal Party	
Aasmund Kulien	Norwegian Labour Party	
Gabriel Endresen Moseid	Bondepartiet	
Bent Røiseland	Liberal Party	

== Market towns of Vest-Agder and Rogaland ==
These market towns were Flekkefjord, Haugesund, Kristiansand, Mandal and Stavanger.

Navn	parti	Comments/supleant representatives
Gustav Natvig-Pedersen	Norwegian Labour Party	
Christian Stephansen Oftedal	Liberal Party	
Jakob Johan Sigfrid Friis	Norwegian Labour Party	
Sven Nielsen	Conservative Party	
Carl Julius Alvin Westerlund	Norwegian Labour Party	
Oscar Olsen	Liberal Party	
Sven Oftedal	Norwegian Labour Party	While a member of cabinet, Egil Eriksen filled his seat. Died in June 1948, replaced by Egil Eriksen.

== Akershus ==
Navn	parti	Comments/supleant representatives
Trygve Lie	Norwegian Labour Party	
Herman Smitt Ingebretsen	Conservative Party	
Hartvig Svendsen	Norwegian Labour Party	
Kirsten Hansteen	Communist Party of Norway	
Arne Torolf Strøm	Norwegian Labour Party	
Sverre Hope	Conservative Party	
Erling Wikborg	Christian Democratic Party	

== Bergen ==
Navn	parti	Comments/supleant representatives
Mons Lid	Norwegian Labour Party	
Randulf Dalland	Communist Party of Norway	
Arthur Sundt	Liberal Party	
Sjur Lindebrække	Conservative Party	
Joachim Dahl	Norwegian Labour Party	

== Buskerud ==
Navn	parti	Comments/supleant representatives
Konrad Gustav Knudsen	Norwegian Labour Party	
Lars Breie	Norwegian Labour Party	
Gudbrand Bernhardsen Tandberg	Conservative Party	Died in June 1949. Was replaced by Snefrid Eriksmoen.
Astrid Skare	Norwegian Labour Party	
Kittill Kristoffersen Berg	Communist Party of Norway	

== Market towns of Buskerud ==
These market towns were Drammen, Hønefoss and Kongsberg.

Navn	parti	Comments/supleant representatives
Olaf Fredrik Watnebryn	Norwegian Labour Party	
Bernt Ingvaldsen	Conservative Party	
Olaf Sørensen	Norwegian Labour Party	

== Finnmark ==
Navn	parti	Comments/supleant representatives
Johannes Olai Olsen	Norwegian Labour Party	
Terje Wold	Norwegian Labour Party	
Alfred Leonard Kristian Vågnes	Communist Party of Norway	

== Hedmark ==
Navn	parti	Comments/supleant representatives
Kristian Fjeld	Norwegian Labour Party	
Arvid Johansen	Norwegian Labour Party	
Emil Løvlien	Communist Party of Norway	
Harald Johan Løbak	Norwegian Labour Party	
Johanne Samueline Pedersen	Norwegian Labour Party	
Einar Frogner	Bondepartiet	
Alv Kjøs	Conservative Party	

== Market towns of Hedmark and Oppland ==
These market towns were Gjøvik, Hamar, Kongsvinger and Lillehammer.

Navn	parti	Comments/supleant representatives
Fredrik Monsen	Norwegian Labour Party	
Leif Bjorholt Burull	Conservative Party	
Anders Hove	Norwegian Labour Party	

== Hordaland ==
Navn	parti	Comments/supleant representatives
Jakob Martin Pettersen	Norwegian Labour Party	
Nils Andresson Lavik	Christian Democratic Party	
Nils Tveit	Liberal Party	Died in July 1949. Was replaced by Knut Ytre-Arne.
Ole Jensen Rong d.y	Norwegian Labour Party	
Hans Svarstad	Christian Democratic Party	
Henrik Friis Robberstad	Conservative Party	
Haldor Andreas Haldorsen	Liberal Party	
Isak Larsson Flatabø	Norwegian Labour Party	

== Møre og Romsdal ==
Navn	parti	Comments/supleant representatives
Einar Hareide	Christian Democratic Party	
Olav Berntsen Oksvik	Norwegian Labour Party	
Trygve Utheim	Liberal Party	
Lars Sverkeson Romundstad	Bondepartiet	
Sverre Reiten	Christian Democratic Party	
Peder Alsvik	Norwegian Labour Party	
Hans Ingvald Hansen Ratvik	Liberal Party	

== Market towns of Møre og Romsdal ==
These market towns were Kristiansund, Molde and Ålesund.

Navn	parti	Comments/supleant representatives
Ulrik Olsen	Norwegian Labour Party	
Kaare Fostervoll	Norwegian Labour Party	
Ivar Bae	Conservative Party	

== Nordland ==
Navn	parti	Comments/supleant representatives
Jens Olai Steffensen	Norwegian Labour Party	
Parelius Hjalmar Bang Berntsen	Norwegian Labour Party	
Cato Andreas Sverdrup	Conservative Party	Died in April 1948. Was replaced by Kristian Johan Bodøgaard.
Reidar Carlsen	Norwegian Labour Party	
Anton Olai Normann Ingebrigtsen Djupvik	Liberal Party	
Haakon Olsen Wika	Norwegian Labour Party	
Kristian Magnus Falsen Johansen Moljord	Communist Party of Norway	
Hårek Ludvig Hansen	Conservative Party	

== Market towns of Nordland, Troms and Finnmark ==
These market towns were Bodø, Hammerfest, Narvik, Tromsø, Vadsø and Vardø.

Navn	parti	Comments/supleant representatives
Jon Andrå	Norwegian Labour Party	
Theodor Broch	Norwegian Labour Party	
Kjell Tellander	Conservative Party	
Toralv Kollin Markussen	Communist Party of Norway	

== Oppland ==
Navn	parti	Comments/supleant representatives
Lars Magnus Moen	Norwegian Labour Party	
Martin Smeby	Norwegian Labour Party	
Arne Rostad	Bondepartiet	
Ola Torstensen Lyngstad	Liberal Party	
Olav Meisdalshagen	Norwegian Labour Party	
Anton Ryen	Bondepartiet	

== Oslo ==
Navn	parti	Comments/supleant representatives
Einar Gerhardsen	Norwegian Labour Party	
Carl Joachim Hambro	Conservative Party	
Oscar Fredrik Torp	Norwegian Labour Party	
Johan Strand Johansen	Communist Party of Norway	
Rolf Stranger	Conservative Party	
Ingvald Haugen	Norwegian Labour Party	
Rakel Seweriin	Norwegian Labour Party	

== Rogaland ==
Navn	parti	Comments/supleant representatives
Ivar Kristiansen Hognestad	Norwegian Labour Party	
Lars Ramndal	Liberal Party	
Lars Elisæus Vatnaland	Bondepartiet	
Jakob Martinus Remseth	Norwegian Labour Party	
Torkell Vinje	Conservative Party	

== Sogn og Fjordane ==
Navn	parti	Comments/supleant representatives
Jakob Mathias Antonson Lothe	Liberal Party	
Einar Magnus Stavang	Norwegian Labour Party	
Jens Lunde	Bondepartiet	
Anders Johanneson Bøyum	Liberal Party	
Ivar Jacobsen Norevik	Norwegian Labour Party	

== Telemark ==
Navn	parti	Comments/supleant representatives
Olav Aslakson Versto	Norwegian Labour Party	
Harald Selås	Norwegian Labour Party	
Margit Schiøtt	Liberal Party	Died in September 1946, was replaced by Ketil Skogen.
Tidemann Flaata Evensen	Norwegian Labour Party	
Olav Svalastog	Christian Democratic Party	

== Market towns of Telemark and Aust-Agder ==
These market towns were Arendal, Brevik, Grimstad, Kragerø, Notodden, Porsgrunn, Risør and Skien.

Navn	parti	Comments/supleant representatives
Sverre Offenberg Løberg	Norwegian Labour Party	
Carl August Petersen Wright	Conservative Party	
Bernhard Berthelsen	Liberal Party	
Paul Tjøstolsen Sunde	Norwegian Labour Party	
Karl Eugen Hammerstedt	Communist Party of Norway	

== Troms ==
Navn	parti	Comments/supleant representatives
Aldor Ingebrigtsen	Norwegian Labour Party	
Håkon Martin Breivoll	Norwegian Labour Party	
Søren Berg Sørensen Moen	Norwegian Labour Party	Died in May 1946. Was replaced by Peder Nikolai Leier Jacobsen.
Hans Eidnes	Liberal Party	
Nils Kristen Jacobsen	Norwegian Labour Party	

== Nord-Trøndelag ==
Navn	parti	Comments/supleant representatives
Johan Wiik	Norwegian Labour Party	
Gunvald Engelstad	Norwegian Labour Party	
Jon Leirfall	Bondepartiet	
Olav Benum	Liberal Party	
Leif Granli	Norwegian Labour Party	

== Sør-Trøndelag ==
Navn	parti	Comments/supleant representatives
Johan Nygaardsvold	Norwegian Labour Party	
Amund Rasmussen Skarholt	Norwegian Labour Party	
Ingvald Svinsås-Lo	Liberal Party	
Paul Martin Dahlø	Norwegian Labour Party	
Nils Trædal	Bondepartiet	Died in 1948. Holger Stjern moved up as a representative.
Ingvald Tøndel	Christian Democratic Party	

== Market towns of Sør-Trøndelag and Nord-Trøndelag ==
These market towns were Levanger and Trondheim.

Navn	parti	Comments/supleant representatives
Sverre Kornelius Eilertsen Støstad	Norwegian Labour Party	
John Lyng	Conservative Party	
Jørgen Herman Vogt	Communist Party of Norway	
Håkon Johnsen	Norwegian Labour Party	
Svein Olsen Øraker	Norwegian Labour Party	

== Vestfold ==
Navn	parti	Comments/supleant representatives
Laurits Grønland	Norwegian Labour Party	
Frithjof Bettum	Conservative Party	
Eivind Kristoffer Eriksen	Norwegian Labour Party	Died in August 1949. Was replaced by Marie Ingeborg Skau.
Sigurd Lersbryggen	Conservative Party	

== Market towns of Vestfold ==
These market towns were Holmestrand, Horten, Larvik, Sandefjord, Stavern and Tønsberg.

Navn	parti	Comments/supleant representatives
Johan Andersen	Norwegian Labour Party	
Jørgen Leonard Firing	Conservative Party	
Carl Henry	Norwegian Labour Party	
Claudia Olsen	Conservative Party	

== Østfold ==
Navn	parti	Comments/supleant representatives
Magnus Johansen	Norwegian Labour Party	
Asbjørn Solberg	Christian Democratic Party	
Klara Amalie Skoglund	Norwegian Labour Party	
Arthur Arntzen	Norwegian Labour Party	
Leif Grøner	Conservative Party	
Wilhelm Engel Bredal	Bondepartiet	

== Market towns of Østfold and Akershus ==
These market towns were Drøbak, Fredrikstad, Halden, Moss and Sarpsborg.

Navn	parti	Comments/supleant representatives
Nils Hønsvald	Norwegian Labour Party	
Henry Jacobsen	Norwegian Labour Party	
Erling Fredriksfryd	Conservative Party	
Jens Martin Arctander Jenssen	Communist Party of Norway	
