= List of members of the Storting, 1950–1953 =

This is a list of the members of the Storting in the period 1950 to 1953. The list includes all those initially elected to the Storting.

There were a total of 150 representatives, distributed among the parties: 85 from the Norwegian Labour Party, 23 from the Conservative Party, 21 from the Liberal Party, 12 from the Farmer’s Party and 9 from the Christian Democratic Party.

== Aust-Agder ==
Navn	Parti	Comments/Suppleant representatives
Torvald Haavardstad	Norwegian Labour Party	
Einar Iveland	Liberal Party	
Olav Kjetilson Nylund	Norwegian Labour Party	
Magnhild Hagelia	Norwegian Labour Party	

== Vest-Agder ==
Navn	Parti	Comments/Suppleant representatives
Bent Røiseland	Liberal Party	
Aasmund Kulien	Norwegian Labour Party	
Gabriel Endresen Moseid	Farmer’s Party	Elected through a joint list of the Conservative Party and the Farmers' Party
Syvert Tobiassen Messel	Liberal Party	

== Market towns of Vest-Agder and Rogaland ==
These market towns were Flekkefjord, Haugesund, Kristiansand, Mandal and Stavanger.

Navn	Parti	Comments/Suppleant representatives
Gustav Natvig-Pedersen	Norwegian Labour Party	
Paul Ingebretsen	Liberal Party	
Jakob Johan Sigfrid Friis	Norwegian Labour Party	
Sven Nielsen	Conservative Party	
Nils Emaus Nilsen	Norwegian Labour Party	
Einar Osland	Liberal Party	
Trond Hegna	Norwegian Labour Party	

== Akershus ==
Navn	Parti	Comments/Suppleant representatives
Halvard Lange	Norwegian Labour Party	
Hartvig Svendsen	Norwegian Labour Party	
Sverre Hope	Conservative Party	
Liv Tomter	Norwegian Labour Party	
Arne Torolf Strøm	Norwegian Labour Party	
Hans Borgen	Farmer’s Party	
Hartvig Caspar Christie	Conservative Party	

== Bergen ==
Navn	Parti	Comments/Suppleant representatives
Nils Langhelle	Norwegian Labour Party	Anna Berentine Anthoni. Replaced by Anthoni in Parliament after becoming a Cabinet member.
Finn Øen	Liberal Party	
Joachim Dahl	Norwegian Labour Party	
Sjur Lindebrække	Conservative Party	
Torstein Selvik	Norwegian Labour Party	

== Buskerud ==
Navn	Parti	Comments/Suppleant representatives
Konrad Gustav Knudsen	Norwegian Labour Party	
Lars Breie	Norwegian Labour Party	
Astrid Skare	Norwegian Labour Party	
Hans Oskar Evju	Farmer’s Party	Elected through a joint list of the Farmers' Party and the Liberal Party
Torolv Kandahl	Conservative Party	

== Market towns of Buskerud ==
These market towns were Drammen, Hønefoss and Kongsberg.

Navn	Parti	Comments/Suppleant representatives
Olaf Fredrik Watnebryn	Norwegian Labour Party	
Bernt Ingvaldsen	Conservative Party	
Olaf Sørensen	Norwegian Labour Party	

== Finnmark ==
Navn	Parti	Comments/Suppleant representatives
Johannes Olai Olsen	Norwegian Labour Party	
Cornelius Karlstrøm	Norwegian Labour Party	
Harry Johan Olai Klippenvåg	Norwegian Labour Party	

== Hedmark ==
Navn	Parti	Comments/Suppleant representatives
Kristian Fjeld	Norwegian Labour Party	
Harald Johan Løbak	Norwegian Labour Party	
Einar Frogner	Farmer’s Party	Elected through a joint list of the Conservative Party, the Farmers' Party and the Liberal Party
Reidar Magnus Aamo	Norwegian Labour Party	
Paul Oskar Lindberget	Norwegian Labour Party	
Alv Kjøs	Conservative Party	Elected through a joint list of the Conservative Party, the Farmers' Party and the Liberal Party
Johanne Samueline Pedersen	Norwegian Labour Party	

== Market towns of Hedmark and Oppland ==
These market towns were Gjøvik, Hamar, Kongsvinger and Lillehammer.

Navn	Parti	Comments/Suppleant representatives
Sigurd Pedersen	Norwegian Labour Party	
Anders Hove	Norwegian Labour Party	
Guttorm Granum	Conservative Party	

== Hordaland ==
Navn	Parti	Comments/Suppleant representatives
Jakob Martin Pettersen	Norwegian Labour Party	
Nils Andresson Lavik	Christian Democratic Party	
Haldor Andreas Haldorsen	Liberal Party	
Ole Jensen Rong d.y.	Norwegian Labour Party	
Isak Larsson Flatabø	Norwegian Labour Party	
Hans Svarstad	Christian Democratic Party	
Chr. L. Holm	Conservative Party	
Knut Ytre-Arne	Liberal Party	

== Møre og Romsdal ==
Navn	Parti	Comments/Suppleant representatives
Einar Hareide	Christian Democratic Party	
Olav Berntsen Oksvik	Norwegian Labour Party	
Knut Olaf Andreasson Strand	Liberal Party	
Knut Toven	Christian Democratic Party	
Peder Alsvik	Norwegian Labour Party	
Haldor Bjerkeseth	Christian Democratic Party	
Trygve Utheim	Liberal Party	Died in June 1952. Was replaced by Anders Endreson Skrondal.

== Market towns of Møre og Romsdal ==
These market towns were Kristiansund, Molde and Ålesund.

Navn	Parti	Comments/Suppleant representatives
Anton Ludvik Alvestad	Norwegian Labour Party	
Kristian Langlo	Liberal Party	
Ulrik Olsen	Norwegian Labour Party	

== Nordland ==
Navn	Parti	Comments/Suppleant representatives
Reidar Carlsen	Norwegian Labour Party	
Jens Olai Steffensen	Norwegian Labour Party	
Parelius Hjalmar Bang Berntsen	Norwegian Labour Party	
Arnold Carl Johansen	Conservative Party	
Jonas Enge	Norwegian Labour Party	
Kolbjørn Sigurd Verner Varmann	Norwegian Labour Party	
Erling Johan Vindenes	Liberal Party	
Kristoffer Skåne Grytnes	Christian Democratic Party	

== Market towns of Nordland, Troms and Finnmark ==
These market towns were Bodø, Hammerfest, Narvik, Tromsø, Vadsø and Vardø.

Navn	Parti	Comments/Suppleant representatives
Alfred Sigurd Nilsen	Norwegian Labour Party	
Ingvald Johannes Jaklin	Norwegian Labour Party	
Alfred Nilsen	Liberal Party	
Erling Johannes Norvik	Conservative Party	

== Oppland ==
Navn	Parti	Comments/Suppleant representatives
Lars Magnus Moen	Norwegian Labour Party	
Olav Meisdalshagen	Norwegian Labour Party	
Anton Ryen	Farmer’s Party	
Martin Smeby	Norwegian Labour Party	
Gunnar Kalrasten	Norwegian Labour Party	
Trond Halvorsen Wirstad	Farmer’s Party	

== Oslo ==
Navn	Parti	Comments/Suppleant representatives
Einar Gerhardsen	Norwegian Labour Party	
Carl Joachim Hambro	Conservative Party	
Rakel Seweriin	Norwegian Labour Party	
Rolf Stranger	Conservative Party	
Finn Moe	Norwegian Labour Party	
Herman Smitt Ingebretsen	Conservative Party	
Trygve Bratteli	Norwegian Labour Party	

== Rogaland ==
Navn	Parti	Comments/Suppleant representatives
Ivar Kristiansen Hognestad	Norwegian Labour Party	
Lars Elisæus Vatnaland	Farmer’s Party	Elected through a joint list of the Conservative Party and the Farmers' Party
Lars Ramndal	Liberal Party	
Kjell Bondevik	Christian Democratic Party	
Jakob Martinus Remseth	Norwegian Labour Party	

== Sogn og Fjordane ==
Navn	Parti	Comments/Suppleant representatives
Einar Magnus Stavang	Norwegian Labour Party	
Jakob Mathias Antonson Lothe	Liberal Party	
Jens Lunde	Farmer’s Party	
Ivar Jacobsen Norevik	Norwegian Labour Party	Died in March 1954. Was replaced by Edvard Anderson Solheim.
Anders Johanneson Bøyum	Liberal Party	

== Telemark ==
Navn	Parti	Comments/Suppleant representatives
Olav Aslakson Versto	Norwegian Labour Party	
Harald Selås	Norwegian Labour Party	
Neri Valen	Liberal Party	
Tidemann Flaata Evensen	Norwegian Labour Party	
Halvor Bunkholt	Farmer’s Party	Elected through a joint list of the Conservative Party and the Farmers' Party

== Market towns of Telemark and Aust-Agder ==
These market towns were Arendal, Brevik, Grimstad, Kragerø, Notodden, Porsgrunn, Risør and Skien.

Navn	Parti	Comments/Suppleant representatives
Sverre Offenberg Løberg	Norwegian Labour Party	
Paul Tjøstolsen Sunde	Norwegian Labour Party	
Carl August Petersen Wright	Conservative Party	
Bernhard Berthelsen	Liberal Party	
Johannes Pettersen Løkke	Norwegian Labour Party	

== Troms ==
Navn	Parti	Comments/Suppleant representatives
Aldor Ingebrigtsen	Norwegian Labour Party	Died in November 1952. Was replaced by Hans Kristian Hauan.
Håkon Martin Breivoll	Norwegian Labour Party	
Nils Kristen Jacobsen	Norwegian Labour Party	
Hans Nikolai Stavrand	Liberal Party	
Peder Nikolai Leier Jacobsen	Norwegian Labour Party	

== Nord-Trøndelag ==
Navn	Parti	Comments/Suppleant representatives
Johan Wiik	Norwegian Labour Party	
Jon Leirfall	Farmer’s Party	
Gunvald Engelstad	Norwegian Labour Party	
Leif Granli	Norwegian Labour Party	
Olav Benum	Liberal Party	

== Sør-Trøndelag ==
Navn	Parti	Comments/Suppleant representatives
Amund Rasmussen Skarholt	Norwegian Labour Party	Died in April 1956. Was replaced by Jenny Lund.
Paul Martin Dahlø	Norwegian Labour Party	
Per Almaas	Norwegian Labour Party	
Per Borten	Farmer’s Party	
Ingvald Tøndel	Christian Democratic Party	Died in September 1952. Was replaced by Johannes Wigum.
Mons Arntsen Løvset	Conservative Party	

== Market towns of Sør-Trøndelag and Nord-Trøndelag ==
These market towns were Levanger and Trondheim.

Navn	Parti	Comments/Suppleant representatives
Håkon Johnsen	Norwegian Labour Party	
John Lyng	Conservative Party	
Carl Viggo Manthey Lange	Norwegian Labour Party	
Reidar Andreas Lyseth	Norwegian Labour Party	
Ole Mikal Kobbe	Conservative Party	

== Vestfold ==
Navn	Parti	Comments/Suppleant representatives
Torgeir Andreas Berge	Norwegian Labour Party	
Sigurd Lersbryggen	Conservative Party	
Reidar Strømdahl	Norwegian Labour Party	
Karl Johan Edvardsen	Liberal Party	Elected through a joint list of the Farmers' Party and the Liberal Party

== Market towns of Vestfold ==
These market towns were Holmestrand, Horten, Larvik, Sandefjord, Stavern and Tønsberg.

Navn	Parti	Comments/Suppleant representatives
Oscar Fredrik Torp	Norwegian Labour Party	
Claudia Olsen	Conservative Party	
Johan Andersen	Norwegian Labour Party	
Bjarne Støtvig	Conservative Party	

== Østfold ==
Navn	Parti	Comments/Suppleant representatives
Arthur Arntzen	Norwegian Labour Party	
Sverre Gjørwad	Conservative Party	Elected through a joint list of the Conservative Party, the Farmers' Party and the Liberal Party
Klara Amalie Skoglund	Norwegian Labour Party	
Anton Berge	Norwegian Labour Party	Died in July 1951. Was replaced by Karl Henry Karlsen.
Wilhelm Engel Bredal	Farmer’s Party	Elected through a joint list of the Conservative Party, the Farmers' Party and the Liberal Party
Asbjørn Solberg	Christian Democratic Party	

== Market towns of Østfold and Akershus ==
These market towns were Drøbak, Fredrikstad, Halden, Moss and Sarpsborg.

Navn	Parti	Comments/Suppleant representatives
Nils Hønsvald	Norwegian Labour Party	
Henry Jacobsen	Norwegian Labour Party	
Erling Fredriksfryd	Conservative Party	
Ragnvald Marensius Gundersen	Norwegian Labour Party	
