= 1896 in Norway =

- Centuries: 17th; 18th; 19th; 20th; 21st
- Decades: 1870s; 1880s; 1890s; 1900s; 1910s
- See also: 1896 in Sweden; List of years in Norway

Events in the year 1896 in Norway.

== Incumbents ==
- Monarch: Oscar II.
- Prime Minister: Francis Hagerup

== Events ==
- The BAA's first organised eclipse expedition
- 11 July – Noregs Ungdomslag (lit. "Norway's youth society") was founded.

== Popular culture ==
=== Sports ===
- 3 March – FC Lyn Oslo football club is founded.

== Births ==
=== January to March ===
- 4 January
  - Jørgen Løvset, gynecologist and academic (died 1981)
  - Johanne Reutz Gjermoe, economist and politician (died 1989).
- 2 February – Einar Ræder, long jumper (died 1976)
- 5 February – Paul Tjøstolsen Sunde, politician (died 1958)
- 9 February – Arthur Rydstrøm, gymnast and Olympic silver medallist (died 1986)
- 10 February – Alf Aanning, gymnast and Olympic silver medallist (died 1948)
- 17 February – Arthur Qvist, horse rider and Olympic silver medallist (died 1973)
- 22 February – Ingvald Johannes Jaklin, politician (died 1966)

=== April to June ===
- 9 April – Cato Andreas Sverdrup, politician (died 1948)
- 20 April – Asbjørn Bodahl, gymnast and Olympic silver medallist (died 1962)
- 21 April – Leif Høegh, shipowner (died 1974)
- 22 April – Gunnar Jamvold, sailor and Olympic gold medallist (died 1984)
- 22 May – Leiv Kreyberg, pathologist (died 1984).

=== July to September ===
- 16 July – Trygve Lie, politician, the first elected United Nations Secretary-General (died 1968)
- 19 July – Olaf Solumsmoen, newspaper editor and politician (died 1972)
- 27 July – Ivar Andresen, opera singer (died 1940)
- 27 July – Olav Svalastog, politician (died 1979)
- 21 August – Gunnar Reiss-Andersen, poet and author (died 1964)
- 25 August – Eilif Løvrak Holmesland, jurist and politician
- 11 September – Isak Larsson Flatabø, politician (died 1969)
- 20 September – Einar Gundersen, international soccer player (died 1962)
- 22 September – Claudia Olsen, politician (died 1980)

=== October to December ===
- 8 October – Jon Vislie, lawyer, executed as a reprisal (died 1945)
- 25 October – Karl Marthinsen, commander of Statspolitiet and Sikkerhetspolitiet in Norway during the Nazi occupation (died 1945)
- 26 October – Johs Haugerud, politician (died 1971)
- 1 November – Mathias Torstensen, rower
- 12 November – Lars Evensen, trade unionist and politician (died 1969)

=== Full date unknown ===
- Gunnar Bråthen, politician and Minister (died 1980)
- Mons Lid, politician and Minister (died 1967)
- Asbjørn Øverås, educator (died 1966)
- Alfred Trønsdal, politician (died 1953)

== Deaths ==
- 3 January – Andreas Grimelund, bishop (born 1812)
- 16 February – Jens Andreas Friis, linguist and author (born 1821)
- 23 September – Ivar Aasen, philologist, lexicographer, playwright and poet (born 1813)

=== Full date unknown ===
- Ludvig Aubert, politician and Minister (born 1838)
- Ludvig Maribo Benjamin Aubert, jurist and politician (born 1836)
- Peter Hersleb Graah Birkeland, bishop (born 1807)
- Jess Julius Engelstad, engineer and railroad administrator (born 1822)
- Baard Madsen Haugland, politician (born 1835)
- Erik Jørgensen, master gunsmith (born 1848)
- Lars Anton Nicolai Larsen-Naur, politician (born 1841)
- Olav Paulssøn, bailiff, writer and politician (born 1822)
