= Market towns of Telemark and Aust-Agder counties =

Former electoral district in Norway

The Market towns of Telemark and Aust-Agder counties (Norwegian: Kjøpstedene i Telemark og Aust-Agder fylker) was an electoral district for parliamentary elections in Norway. It comprised the market towns (Norwegian: kjøpsteder) of Brevik, Kragerø, Notodden, Porsgrunn, and Skien in Telemark county and Arendal, Grimstad, and Risør in Aust-Agder county.

The district was established ahead of the 1921 Norwegian parliamentary election following the change from single member constituencies to plural member constituencies in 1919.

Following changes in the national policy on market towns in 1952, these electoral districts were abolished ahead of the 1953 Norwegian parliamentary election. Instead, each county became one electoral district, and for election purposes the towns were integrated into their respective counties.

== Representatives ==
The following representatives were elected from the Market towns of Telemark and Aust-Agder counties:

	Representative 1	Representative 2	Representative 3	Representative 4	Representative 5
1921	Spangelo, FV	Reiersen, A	Støren, H	F.C. Knudsen, H	Berg, V
1924	† Støren, H B. Solberg, H	Andresen, A	Kjølseth, V	Andersen, H	C. Knudsen, H
1927	Andersen, H	Hafnor, A	Pedersen, V	Ferslew, H	O. Solberg, A
1930	Løvold, H	O. Solberg, A	Hartmann, V	Johansen, H	Bergland, A
1933	O. Solberg, A	Brinch, H	Alexander, V	Nilsen, A	Johansen, H
1936	O. Solberg, A	Wright, H	Sollid, V	Nilsen, A	Brinch, H
1945	Løberg, A	Wright, H	Berthelsen, V	Sunde, A	Hammerstedt, NKP
1949	Løberg, A	Sunde, A	Wright, H	Berthelsen, V	Løkke, A

Legend:

- NKP = Communist Party, Norges Kommunistiske Parti
- A = Labour Party, Det Norske Arbeiderparti
- SDA = Social Democratic Labour Party, Norges Socialdemokratiske Arbeiderparti
- RF = Radical People's Party (Worker Democrats), Det Radikale Folkeparti (Arbeiderdemokratene)
- KrF = Christian Democratic Party, Kristelig Folkeparti
- B = Farmers' Party, Bondepartiet
- V = Liberal Party, Venstre
- FV = Liberal Left Party, Frisinnede Venstre
- H = Conservative Party, Høyre
