= Holmesland =

Holmesland is a surname. Notable people with the surname include:

- Eilif Løvrak Holmesland (1896–1954), Norwegian jurist and politician
- Peder Johan Pedersen Holmesland (1833–1914), Norwegian politician
- Peter Karl Holmesland (1866–1933), Norwegian jurist and politician
- Simon Pedersen Holmesland (1823–1895), Norwegian politician
