= Market towns of Vestfold county =

Former electoral district in Norway

The Market towns of Vestfold county (Norwegian: Kjøpstedene i Vestfold fylke) was an electoral district for parliamentary elections in Norway. It comprised the market towns (Norwegian: kjøpsteder) of Holmestrand, Horten, Tønsberg, Sandefjord and Larvik in Vestfold county.

The district was established ahead of the 1921 Norwegian parliamentary election following the change from single member constituencies to plural member constituencies in 1919.

Following changes in the national policy on market towns in 1952, these electoral districts were abolished ahead of the 1953 Norwegian parliamentary election. Instead, each county became one electoral district, and for election purposes the towns were integrated into their respective counties.

== Representatives ==
The following representatives were elected from the Market towns of Vestfold county:

	Representative 1	Representative 2	Representative 3	Representative 4
1921	Christiansen, H	Meinich, H	Høeg, H	Hanssen, A
1924	Christiansen, H	H.B. Sollie, H	Jenssen, SDA	Preus, H
1927	Spæren, H	Jenssen, A	Blom, H	Christiansen, A
1930	Nerdrum, H	Jenssen, A	Blom, H	Rynning, H
1933	Jenssen, A	Sverdrup, H	Christiansen, A	H.J. Sollie, H
1936	Jenssen, A	Sverdrup, H	Christiansen, A	Meyer, H
1945	Andersen, A	Firing, H	Henry, A	Olsen, H
1949	Torp, A	Olsen, H	Andersen, A	Støtvig, H

Legend:

- NKP = Communist Party, Norges Kommunistiske Parti
- A = Labour Party, Det Norske Arbeiderparti
- SDA = Social Democratic Labour Party, Norges Socialdemokratiske Arbeiderparti
- RF = Radical People's Party (Worker Democrats), Det Radikale Folkeparti (Arbeiderdemokratene)
- KrF = Christian Democratic Party, Kristelig Folkeparti
- B = Farmers' Party, Bondepartiet
- V = Liberal Party, Venstre
- FV = Liberal Left Party, Frisinnede Venstre
- H = Conservative Party, Høyre
