= Eivind Reiersen =

Norwegian newspaper editor and politician

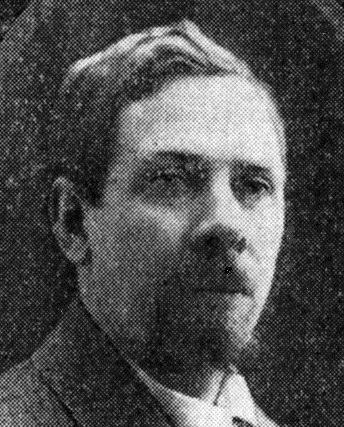
- Born: June 11, 1877
- Died: September 16, 1947 (aged 70)
- Political party: Norwegian Labour Party; Communist Party of Norway
- Spouse: Amanda "Manda" Reiersen

Eivind Reiersen (11 June 1877 – 16 September 1947) was a Norwegian newspaper editor and politician for the Labour and Communist parties. He served one term as an MP, was deputy mayor of Skien Municipality, and edited the newspapers Fremover, Ny Dag, Bratsberg-Demokraten (a.k.a. Folkets Dagblad), Telemark Arbeiderblad, Telemark Kommunistblad and Rjukan Arbeiderblad.

== Labour Party career ==
He was born at Ringsevju in Nes in Sauherad Municipality as a son of crofters Reier Eivindsen (1853–1933) and Gunhild Olsdatter (1853–1900). He worked as a farm and forest labourer from 1889 to 1895, construction site labourer from 1895 to 1898 and at a paper factory from 1898 to 1911. He joined the Labour Party in 1899, and was a member of the municipal council of Solum Municipality from 1907 to 1913, serving since 1910 as deputy mayor. He chaired the county branch of the Labour Party in Bratsberg Amt from 1908 to 1913.

In 1911 he left manual labour as he became a secretary in the Norwegian Union of General Workers. In 1913 he was hired as editor-in-chief of the newspaper Fremover. He became the first chairman of Bodø Labour Party in 1914, and remained so until 1915. He was a national board member of the Labour Party from 1915 to 1921, and county leader of the Labour Party in Telemark from 1922 to 1923. From 1916 to 1919 he edited the newspaper Ny Dag, and from 1919 Bratsberg-Demokraten. In January 1921 his newspaper was merged to become Folkets Dagblad. After editing Folkets Dagblad for some time, Reiersen went on to the new, more radical newspaper Telemark Arbeiderblad in the same year.

Reiersen stood for general election in 1918 in the constituency Lillehammer og Gjøvik. He managed to carry the votes in Gjøvik with 620 votes against Ellef Marcussen's 597. Marcussen, however, hailed from Lillehammer and carried the votes there, winning comfortably with 1,817 votes in total against Reiersen's 1,381. Reiersen was later elected to the Parliament of Norway in 1921 from the constituency Market towns of Telemark and Aust-Agder counties. He was a member of the Standing Committee on Customs. He served one term, and the change of party allegiance to Communist came during this term. He was also a member of the executive committee of Skien city council from 1922, and served as deputy mayor from 1925 to 1926.

== Communist Party and back to Labour Party ==
In 1923 Reiersen defected from the Labour Party, joining the newly formed Communist Party. Reiersen served as county leader for the Communist Party until 1925. He headed their ballot for the 1924 and 1927 elections, but was not re-elected.

He edited Ny Dag for a second period in 1924. He then edited Telemark Kommunistblad, as Bratsberg-Demokraten now was named, from 1925 to 1928. He was then the manager in Trondheim from 1928 to 1930. In 1930 he was excluded from the Communist Party, and he eventually rejoined the Labour Party.

Reiersen was occupied from 1933 to 1934 with writing biographies for the workers' encyclopedia Arbeidernes Leksikon. He had earlier written both non-fiction as well as short stories. Many short stories were printed in newspapers, and a short stories collection named Kamp ("Struggle") was released in 1917. In 1940 he served as editor of Rjukan Arbeiderblad for nine months before the newspaper was shut down during the occupation of Norway by Nazi Germany. He was also imprisoned in Møllergata 19 from 22 January to 8 February 1945, then in Grini concentration camp until May 1945 when the war ended.

He was married to Amanda "Manda" Reiersen (1891-1977), born Ingeborg Amanda Ellefsen, who was active in the labour movement as well. He died in September 1947.
