= Ola Solberg =

Norwegian politician (1886–1977)

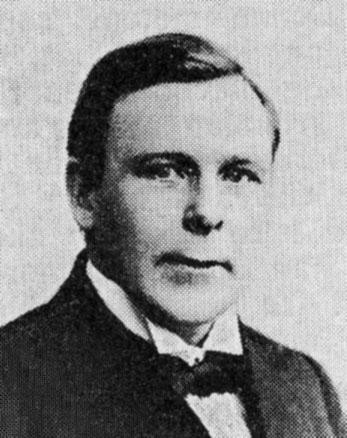
la Solberg's Portrait

Ola Solberg (4 March 1886 – 1977) was a Norwegian newspaper editor and politician for the Labour Party.

He was born in Heradsbygd as a son of painter and smallholder Otto Solberg (1861–1928) and his wife Olava Oppegaard (1863–1942). He studied and graduated from Elverum Teachers' College between 1904 and 1907, and then started his journalistic career. He was also a board member of Norges Socialdemokratiske Ungdomsforbund. He was a subeditor for Solungen from 1907 to 1908 before being editor-in-chief from 1908 to 1909. He was then subeditor in Bratsberg-Demokraten for one year, journalist in Social-Demokraten for one year before becoming editor-in-chief of Sørlandets Social-Demokrat in 1911. He was a member of Kristiansand city council for some time. He left the newspaper in 1920, and Ole Øisang took over.

In 1924 Solberg became editor-in-chief of the newspaper Tiden. He was a member of Arendal city council from 1928, and chaired the local branch (as he had done in Kristiansand). He was also elected to the Parliament of Norway in 1927, 1930, 1933 and 1936, representing the Market towns of Telemark and Aust-Agder counties. His last term was ended by the occupation of Norway by Nazi Germany, during which his newspaper was also closed down.

The newspaper resumed after the Second World War, and at the same time he became mayor. He died in 1977.
