= Ove Andersen =

Ove Andersen may refer to:

- Ove Andersen (athlete) (1899–1967), Finnish athlete
- Ove Andersen (footballer) (born 1937), Danish footballer
- Ove Andersen (politician) (1878–1928), Norwegian politician

== See also ==
- Ove Andersson (1938–2008), Swedish rally driver
- Ove Andersson (footballer) (1916–1983), Swedish footballer
- Ove Conry Andersson (1943-2008), perpetrator of the Kungälv school shooting
