= Bjarne Solberg =

Norwegian physician and politician (1877–1928)

Bjarne Solberg (6 May 1877 – 16 January 1928) was a Norwegian physician and politician for the Conservative Party.

Solberg was born in Kristiania. He finished his secondary education in 1895, and graduated as cand.med. in 1903. He was hired as municipal physician in Heddal Municipality and Notodden Municipality in 1907, and was town physician in Notodden from 1918 to 1926. He was a member of the municipal council of Notodden Municipality from 1922 to 1925, and was a representative to the Norwegian Parliament from the Market towns of Telemark and Aust-Agder counties during the term 1925–1927. In 1926, upon the death of representative Peter Johan Støren, Solberg became a full representative.
