= Bodøgaard =

Bodøgaard is a Norwegian surname. Notable people with the surname include:

- Kristian Johan Bodøgaard (1885–1971), Norwegian politician
- Maria Bodøgaard (born 1983), Norwegian television presenter

== See also ==
- Boogaard
