= Erling =

Erling (Urban East Norwegian: [ˈæ̂ːlɪŋ]) is a Scandinavian male name, meaning "heir of clanchief" or "descendant of the jarl / earl", i.e. prince or similar. Notable people named Erling include:

== Given name ==
- Erling Aas-Eng (born 1965), Norwegian politician
- Erling Aastad (1898–1963), Norwegian long jumper and sprinter
- Erling Aksdal (born 1953), Norwegian jazz pianist and composer
- Erling Andersen (athlete) (born 1960), Norwegian race walker
- Erling Andersen (cross-country skier) (1905–1993), American cross-country skier
- Erling Andersen (footballer) (1901–1969), Norwegian footballer
- Erling Anger (1909–1999), Norwegian civil servant
- Erling Bauck (1924–2004), Norwegian World War II resistance member and writer
- Erling Blöndal Bengtsson (1932–2013), Danish cellist
- Erling Brøndum (1930–2017), Danish journalist and politician
- Erling Christophersen (1898–1994), Norwegian botanist, geographer and diplomat
- Erling Dorf (1905–1984), American geologist
- Erling Drangsholt (1885–1950), Norwegian actor
- Erling Eidem (1880–1972), Swedish theologian who served as archbishop of Uppsala 1931–1950
- Erling Folkvord (born 1949), Norwegian politician
- Erling Haaland (born 2000), Norwegian footballer
- Erling George Haugland, American politician and businessman
- Erling Jevne (born 1966), Norwegian cross-country skier
- Erling Amandus Johansen (1886–1961), Norwegian politician
- Erling Kagge (born 1963), Norwegian explorer, lawyer, art collector, entrepreneur, politician, author and publisher
- Erling Knudtzon (born 1988), Norwegian footballer
- Erling Kongshaug (1915–1993), Norwegian rifle shooter
- Erling Krogh (1888–1968), Norwegian operatic tenor
- Erling Lorentzen (1923–2021), Norwegian-Brazilian shipowner and industrialist
- Erling Mandelmann (1935–2018), Danish photographer
- Erling Dekke Næss (1901–1993), Norwegian shipowner and businessman
- Erling Maartmann-Moe (born 1952), Norwegian businessman in the IT sector
- Erling Persson (1917–2002), Swedish founder of H&M
- Erling Skakke (1115–1179), 12th-century Norwegian earl
- Erling Skjalgsson (975–1028), Norwegian political leader
- Erling Steinvegg (died 1207), candidate of Bagler to the Norwegian throne from 1204 to 1207
- Erling von Mende (born 1940), German professor of Sinology at FU Berlin
- Erling Viksjø (1910–1971), Norwegian architect
- Erling Walderhaug (born 1942), Norwegian politician
- Erling Wold (born 1958), American contemporary composer

== Surname ==
- Tapani Erling (born 1945), Finnish economist

== See also ==
- Erlang (programming language)
- Earling, Iowa, United States
- Earling, West Virginia, United States
