= Independent Norwegian Brigade Group in Germany =

Independent Norwegian Brigade Group in Germany Tysklandsbrigaden
- Coat of Arms of the Brigade
- Active: 1947–1953
- Country: Norway
- Branch: Army
- Type: Infantry
- Role: Occupation force
- Size: 4,200 soldiers (total strength); 50,000 soldiers (total number who served)
- Part of: Norwegian Army Command Germany, 5th Infantry Division (UK)

The Independent Norwegian Brigade Group in Germany (Norwegian: Tysklandsbrigaden, 'the Germany Brigade') was a Norwegian expeditionary force stationed in the British zone of Allied-occupied Germany, from 1946 to 1953. At first it was based in the Hanover area and from 1948 to 1953 in the Schleswig-Holstein area of Germany as part of the British occupying force after World War II.

== Background ==
British authorities and the Norwegian government-in-exile in London during World War II initiated discussions about contributing a Norwegian force to the occupation of Germany after the war. In a letter to the European Advisory Commission dated September 2, 1944 the government expressed its intention but with several reservations, including political approval by the Norwegian parliament once it reconvened, as well as financial resources and staff availability.

The British government initially asked for a "small division" of about 12,000 soldiers. But estimates of the available conscription classes meant this would be far more than the manpower available at the time, and the brigade contingents were, for all brigades, around 4,200 men all told. In total about 50,000 Norwegians served in the brigades.

After the Social Democrat Norwegian government returned to Norway after the German capitulation in 1945, the matter was put on hold for some time. But after a visit by Lieutenant General Ole Berg to the United Kingdom in January 1946, there was a renewed effort to live up to the earlier commitment. The planning process was further complicated by the 1945 parliamentary elections that resulted in a Labour government that reorganized the military leadership of Norwegian defense forces.

In May 1946 the government published its three-year plan that sought to both build a homeland defense force and provide a force for the occupation of Germany.

== Contingents ==
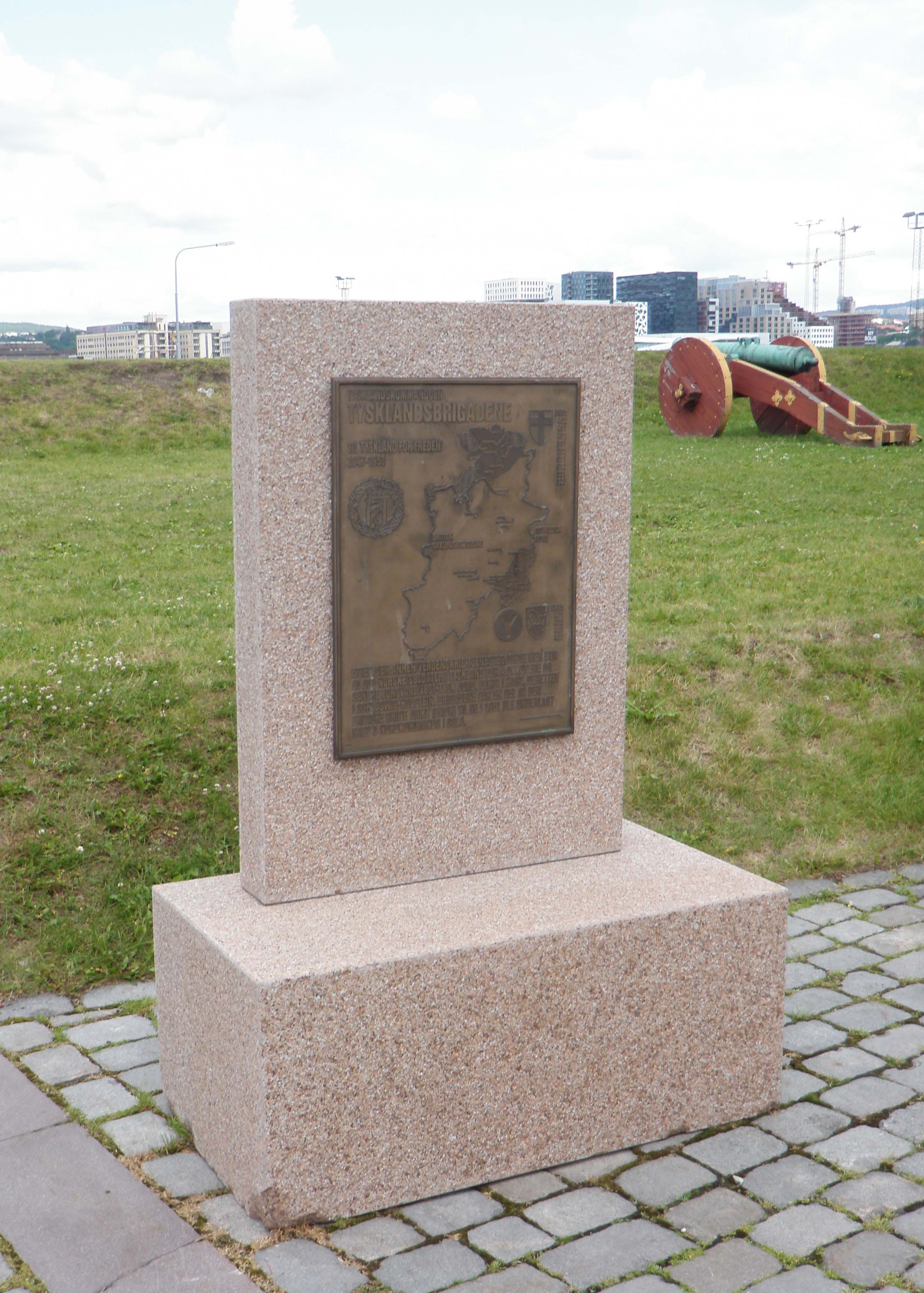
Memorial at Akershus Fortress to the brigades and the more than 50,000 soldiers who saw service with them

Each brigade contingent served for approximately 6 months in Germany (though discrepancies exist, particularly after the start of the Korean War when the service time was extended), starting with Brigade 471. The numbering of the contingents was derived from the year (first two digits) and the contingent for that year (third digit), so Bde. 471 means 1st contingent of 1947.

- Brigade 471
- Brigade 472
- Brigade 481
- Brigade 482
- Brigade 491
- Brigade 492
- Brigade 501
- Brigade 502
- Brigade 511
- Brigade 512
- Brigade 521
- Brigade 522

== Weapons and equipment ==
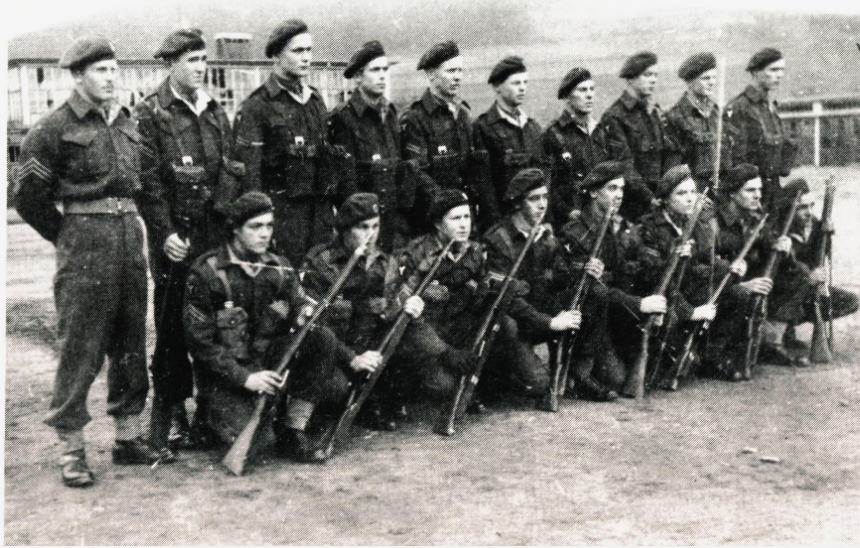
Officer training of Norwegian soldiers in occupied Germany, 1947.

The post-war armament situation in Norway can be simply described by the term "quartermasters' nightmare". The armed forces had and used a wide assortment of Norwegian weapons recaptured from the Germans, captured German weapons, British weapons as issued to Norwegian units trained in Britain, some Swedish weapons that came with the police force consisting of Norwegian refugees trained and equipped in Sweden during the war, and finally British and American weapons from air drops to the resistance.

Tysklandsbrigaden however was supplied by the British and were armed and equipped with British weapons, wore British webbing, and British uniforms. But the difficult situation needed a solution, and after testing and debate the decision was made around 1950 to adopt and standardize the weapons then in use by the United States for the regular armed forces (the Home Guard (Heimevernet) kept the captured Mauser K98's and other German weapons, most converted to fire the .30-06 round to standardize ammunition supply). This decision also covered Tysklandsbrigaden and its weapons.

Starting with some parts of Brigade 512, the transformation was finished during Bde. 521's contingent. This, however, had an advertent effect on the training of the personnel in Bde. 521 and all the ensuing brigades: before this a fairly large amount of ammunition allocated for training purposes had ensured excellent results through rigorous training. The change from .303 caliber Lee–Enfield rifles, Bren LMGs, and Vickers machine guns to .30-06 caliber M1 Garand rifles, BAR LMGs, and Browning M1919 machine guns (these were the principal infantry weapons in use, other weapons types were also affected) meant that the British could no longer supply Tysklandsbrigaden. The considerable drop of available ammunition showed up clearly, when Bde. 521 had to report that, due to lack of ammunition for training, the brigade was not fit for combat.

This was a very serious situation indeed, as not only had the brigade's mission been changed from pure occupation to first-line defence against a possible Soviet invasion of Western Europe; there was at this time serious consideration regarding a Norwegian contingent in the Korean War, and the most convenient troops to send were Tysklandsbrigaden. Luckily for the troops, none were ever sent to Korea, and with the precarious situation a deployment to Korea could easily have ended in disaster.

== Condom discussion ==
In 1948 Norway's cabinet decided that the brigade's soldiers were to be issued condoms. 400,000 signatures of protest were collected, and Hauge asked advice from Trygve Bratteli about the possibility of having Labour Party employees do partial checks of the lists, and "Should it be done?". (Municipal elections were scheduled for later in 1948, and Hauge thought that the signatures might harm the election campaign of the Labour Party.) The resulting advice was that the partial checks could be done, but that it was not advisable. (Even with condoms being issued, the military later found that "five to six percent" of the brigade's soldiers contracted STDs.)

== See also ==
- Allied Occupation Zones in Germany
- Belgian Forces in Germany
