= Eilif Løvrak Holmesland =

Norwegian politician

Eilif Løvrak Holmesland (25 August 1896 – 21 March 1959) was a Norwegian jurist and politician for the Liberal Party.

He was born in Kristiania as the son of Peter Karl Holmesland and grandson of Simon Pedersen Holmesland, both former parliament members. He enrolled as a student in 1914, graduated as cand.jur. in 1919 and started working as an attorney in Gjerpen Municipality, where his father was district stipendiary magistrate (sorenskriver). In 1921 he moved to Arendal to work as a lawyer. He became a Supreme Court lawyer in 1928.

From 1931 he had been a member of the municipal council of Arendal Municipality. He served as a deputy representative to the Norwegian Parliament during the term 1934–1936, representing the Market towns of Telemark and Aust-Agder counties. He met in parliamentary sessions whenever regular member Anton Alexander was unable to show. From 8 May 1945 to 1 December 1945 he was acting County Governor of Aust-Agder after the war until the Norwegian government could pick a permanent governor. Holmesland died in a car accident in Bamble Municipality in 1959.

Government offices
Preceded by Hans Henrik Petersen (WWII Occupied government)	County Governor of Aust-Agder; 8 May 1945–1 Dec 1945 (Acting Governor)	Succeeded by Nils Hjelmtveit
