= Egil Lothe =

Norwegian economist and civil servant

Egil Lothe (11 May 1908 – 1990) was a Norwegian economist and civil servant.

He was born in Bergen as a son of teacher Sjur Mikkelsen Lothe (1870–1941) and Sigrid Alvsaker. In 1940 he married ceramicist Gro Skavlan Arneberg (1911–1964), a daughter of renowned architect Arnstein Arneberg.

He finished secondary school in 1927 and graduated from the Royal Frederick University with the cand.oecon. degree in 1930. He worked as a secretary in the Ministry of Finance from 1939, and later in the Ministry of Provisioning and Reconstruction from 1945 to 1948. From 1948 to 1955 he was an assistant secretary in the Ministry of Finance. During the same period he simultaneously served as an informal State Secretary while Olav Meisdalshagen was Minister of Finance, until 1951. From 1955 to 1968 Lothe served as a director general of state in the Ministry of Agriculture.

He was a board member of the Det Norske Luftfartselskap, Scandinavian Airlines System and NTNF. He was decorated as a Knight of the Order of the Dannebrog and the Order of the Polar Star. He resided in Bærum.
