= Ingjald Nordstad =

Norwegian politician (1897–1960)

Ingjald Nordstad (12 February 1897 – 1960) was a Norwegian newspaper editor and politician for the Labour Party.

Nordstad joined his first trade union in 1914, and the Labour Party in 1916. In 1918, he was imprisoned for conscientious objection.

He was hired as a sub-editor in the newspaper Nybrott in 1919, and in 1922 Nordstad became editor-in-chief after Albin Eines. From 1922 to 1937 and 1952–1955, he was also a member of Larvik city council. From 1929 Nordstad managed the Larvik branch of the Bank of Norway. He was chairman of the board of Larvik library 1930–1932.

During the occupation of Norway by Nazi Germany, Nybrott was stopped on 20 August 1940 for printing material unfavourable to the Nazis. Nordstad had already been arrested and imprisoned from 12 August to 4 September. Nybrott resumed publication, but the Nazi policy deemed it unnecessary to have several newspapers in one city. Nybrott was merged with the bourgeois Østlands-Posten to form Larvik Dagblad from 1 July 1943. Nordstad was editor-in-chief together with Øyvind Næss. Both were arrested on 8 December 1943 and replaced with Carl Henry. Nordstad was again imprisoned. He was incarcerated in Bredtveit concentration camp from 11 December 1943 to 9 February 1944, then in Møllergata 19 until 6 May, then in Grini concentration camp until 13 March 1945, then in Mysen until the war's end. From 1945 he again served as editor-in-chief of Nybrott.
