= Hans Edvard Kjølseth =

Norwegian educator and politician

Hans Edvard Kjølseth (28 September 1870 – 13 January 1966) was a Norwegian educator and politician for the Liberal Party.

He was born at Øverstedal in Sylte Municipality as a son of farmer and joiner Ole Hansen Øverstedal (1839–1911) and Aagot Skorgen (1844–1898). From 1887 to 1893, he worked as a joiner, studied at a technical school, studied under a blacksmith for one year and worked at Trondhjems mekaniske Værksted for three years. From 1894 to 1894, he attended a technical school in Horten, and after one year as a designer at Kongsberg Våpenfabrikk from 1894 to 1895 he was hired at Skiensfjordens mekaniske fagskole in Porsgrunn. He studied at Elektrotechnicum Komotau (in Chomutov) from 1897 to 1898, then returned to his Porsgrunn school where he was promoted to inspector in 1898, headmaster in 1901 and director from 1908 to 1918. He issued several textbooks in electronics, mechanics and machinery. He also released a history book at the 25-year anniversary of Skiensfjordens mekaniske fagskole in 1909, and a book about the local power company in 1937.

Kjølseth was a member of the executive committee of the municipal council of Porsgrunn Municipality. He was elected to the Parliament of Norway in 1924 from the constituency Market towns of Telemark and Aust-Agder counties. He was the secretary of the Standing Committee on the Military, and served one parliamentary term. He was also a member of the Constitutional Court of the Realm during the Impeachment case of 1926 and 1927 where Abraham Berge et al were not convicted. From 1920 to 1941 Kjølseth was the burgomaster (now known as chief administrative officer) of Porsgrunn municipality. On 1 August 1941 he was fired by the Nazi authorities of the German occupation of Norway. He reassumed some of his positions after the occupation.
