= Trond Hegna =

Norwegian politician (1898–1992)

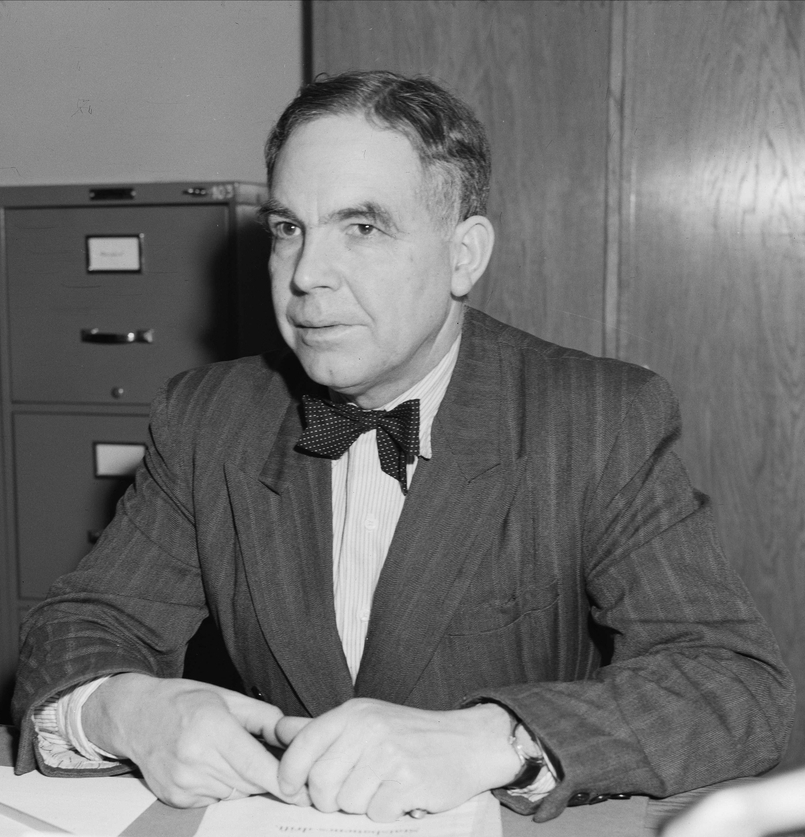

Member of the Norwegian Parliament for Rogaland
- In office 1949–1965

Personal details
- Born: 2 October 1898 Kristiania, Norway
- Died: 20 January 1992 (aged 93) Oslo, Norway
- Party: Norwegian Labour Party, Communist Party of Norway
- Profession: Journalist

Trond Hegna (2 October 1898 – 20 January 1992) was a Norwegian author, journalist and editor. He served as a member of the Norwegian Parliament from Rogaland from 1949 to 1965.

== Biography ==
He was born in Kristiania (now Oslo), Norway. He was the son of Hans Hegna (1863–1945) and Birthe Buttingsrud (1876–1956). He attended Oslo Cathedral School. He studied economic and social economics at the University of Oslo where he became Cand.philol. in 1923.

While a student, he became a member of the Norwegian Labour Party organization for students (Den Socialdemokratiske Studenterforening). It was here the paper and the organization Mot Dag was founded in 1921, and Hegna was involved from the beginning. He edited the paper between 1926 and 1928, remaining throughout its existence a central contributor, and was chairman for the Norwegian Students' Society in 1924 and 1926. Between 1924 and 1925 he was editor-in-chief in Rjukan Arbeiderblad. When Mot Dag became a part of the Communist Party of Norway (NKP) in 1927, Hegna also became the editor for Norges Kommunistblad in a period. He left the party in 1929 along with most of the members of Mot Dag. Between 1932 and 1936 he was also one of the editors of Arbeidernes Leksikon.

When Mot Dag was dissolved in 1936, Hegna again became a member of the Norwegian Labour Party. Between 1939 and 1940 he was the editor of Vestfold Arbeiderblad, and in 1940 he became editor of 1ste Mai (now Rogalands Avis) in Stavanger. During the Occupation of Norway by Nazi Germany, the newspaper was closed after publishing the headline "Ingen nordmann til salgs!" (No Norwegian for sale!). In September 1940, Hegna was arrested and imprisoned in Grini concentration camp until 1943.

After the liberation of Norway at the end of World War II, he again became editor of 1ste Mai, a position he held until 1958. He was a member of Stavanger city council from 1945 to 1955, and was represented at the Storting between 1950 and 1965, for a period leader of the Standing Committee on Finances and Customs . He was in the national board of the Labour Party between 1949 and 1953 and deputy chairman of the party group at Stortinget from 1958. Hegna was one of many Mot Dag members that became influential in the Labour Party after the second world war, but in a contrast to many of these, Hegna was active in the left wing of the party, among other things against Norwegian membership in the European Economic Community in 1972, but he chose to remain with the party.

Hegna also wrote several books, among these books about the Soviet Union, about genealogy, and also served as a translator of fiction books. In 1983 he published the autobiography Min versjon.

== Personal life ==
In 1939, he married Ragna Høyland (1913-1973). Hegna is the grandfather of Norwegian comedian Anne-Kat Hærland.

== Other sources ==
- "Trond Hegna" (in Norwegian). Storting.

== Related reading ==
Trond Hegna (1983) Min versjon (Oslo): Gyldendal) ISBN 9788205130272
