= Romsdals Budstikke =

Norwegian newspaper

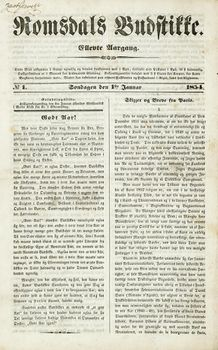
- Romsdals Budstikke front page, 1854
- Type: Daily newspaper
- Format: Tabloid
- Owner: Polaris Media
- Publisher: Guardian Media Group
- Editor: Ole Bjørner Loe Welde
- Founded: 4 July 1843; 182 years ago
- Political alignment: independent-liberal
- Language: Norwegian
- Headquarters: Molde, Norway
- Country: Norway
- Website: rbnett.no

Romsdals Budstikke is a daily (except Sundays) newspaper published in Molde, Norway.

== History and profile ==
Romsdals Budstikke was established in 1843. Politically the paper is liberal and used to be a newspaper for the Liberal Party, but has been independent since 1973. The coverage area includes Molde Municipality, Rauma Municipality, Vestnes Municipality, Aukra Municipality, Hustadvika Municipality, and Gjemnes Municipality.

Mecom owned Romsdals Budstikke until February 2009, when it was sold to the Polaris Media.

In the 1970s, the paper won a circulation war with its local competitor, Romsdal Folkeblad. In 2013 Romsdals Budstikke was named Newspaper of the Year in Norway.

Romsdals Budstikke had an all-time high circulation of 19,004 in 1999. In 2008 the circulation was 18,648. Its circulation was 12,632 copies and 14,903 digital subscribers in 2017 and 11,725 copies and 15,798 digital subscribers in 2019.
