= Christofer Olivius Ferslew =

Norwegian jurist and politician

Christofer Olivius Ferslew (12 July 1874 – 23 January 1940) was a Norwegian jurist and politician for the Conservative Party.

== Life and career ==
He was born in Skien as a son of attorney Gustav Marius Larsen (1844–1927) and his wife Caspara Elisabeth Cathrine Torstenson (1843–1927). He finished his secondary education in 1893, and graduated from university with the cand.jur. degree in 1899. He was a deputy judge in Skien Municipality for three months in 1899, then in Gjerpen Municipality from 1899 to 1901. He was an attorney in Skien from 1902 to 1929, stipendiary magistrate in Ålesund Municipality from 1929 to 1937, and district stipendiary magistrate in Larvik from 1937 to his death.

He was a member of the municipal council of Skien Municipality from 1910 to 1913 and 1916 to 1922. He was elected to the Parliament of Norway in 1927, serving the term 1928–1930 for the Market towns of Telemark and Aust-Agder counties. Ferslew also held posts in the Norwegian Bar Association, the Norwegian Mountain Touring Association and the Norwegian Association of Hunters and Anglers. He became an honorary member of the latter, in both Skien and Ålesund.
