= Olav Meisdalshagen =

Norwegian politician (1903–1959)

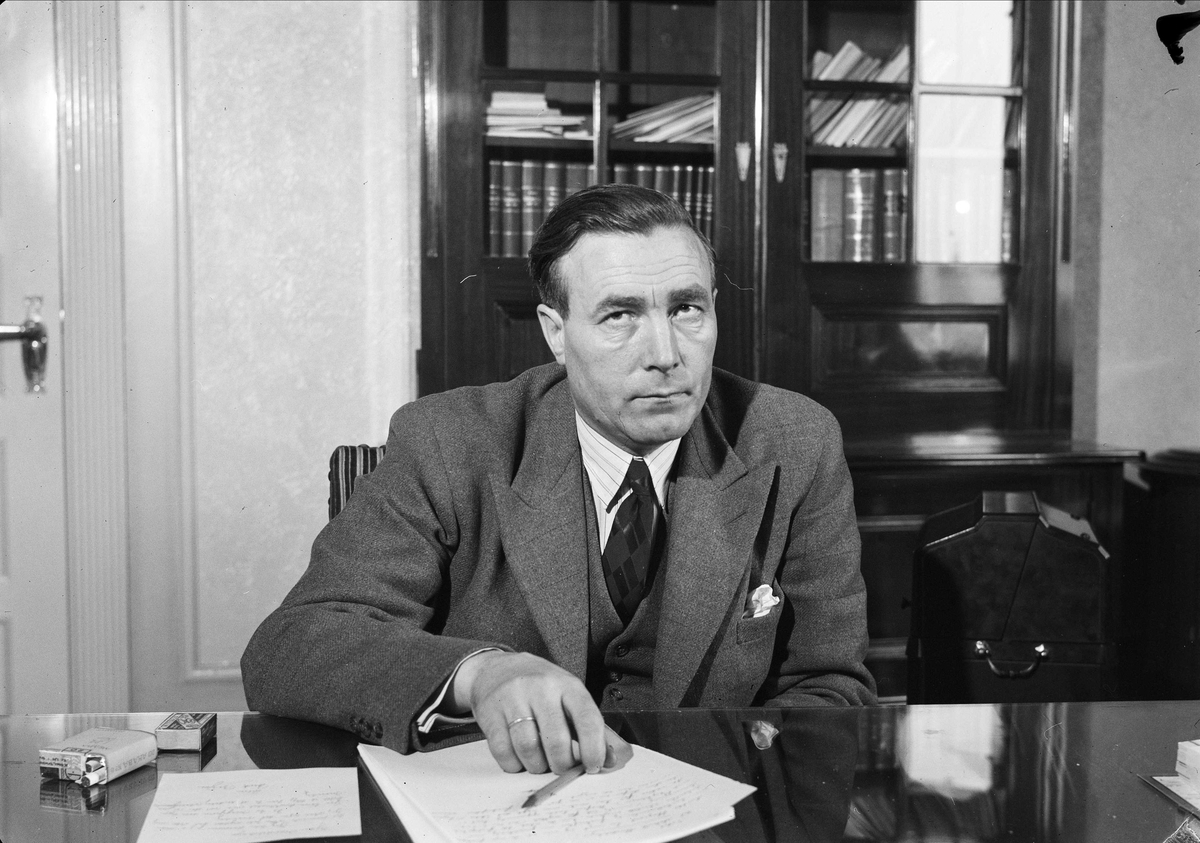
- Meisdalshagen in 1946.

Member of the Norwegian Parliament
- In office 1 January 1936 – 21 November 1959† (deposed 1940–1945 because of WWII)
- Constituency: Oppland

Minister of Finance
- In office 6 December 1947 – 19 November 1951
- Prime Minister: Einar Gerhardsen
- Preceded by: Erik Brofoss
- Succeeded by: Trygve Bratteli

Minister of Agriculture
- In office 22 January 1955 – 14 May 1956
- Prime Minister: Einar Gerhardsen
- Preceded by: Rasmus Nordbø
- Succeeded by: Harald Løbak

Personal details
- Born: 17 March 1903 Nord-Aurdal, Norway
- Died: 21 November 1959 (aged 56) Oslo, Norway
- Party: Labour
- Education: Royal Frederick University
- Occupation: Attorney in Fagernes; Member of Parliament; Chairman of Norges Kooperative Landsforening
- Profession: Jurist

Olav Meisdalshagen (17 March 1903 – 21 November 1959) was a Norwegian politician for the Labour Party best known for serving as the Norwegian Minister of Finance from December 1947 to November 1951 and as the Norwegian Minister of Agriculture from January 1955 to May 1956. He was also a Member of Parliament for a long time, being elected for the first time in parliamentary election of 1936 and serving until his death, except for the period between 1940 and 1945 when the Parliament of Norway was de facto defunct due to the occupation of Norway by Nazi Germany. His death in 1959 came halfway through his fifth term in Parliament, and shortly after a parliamentary speech.

A jurist by profession, Meisdalshagen came from a humble family background, growing up at a former crofter's farm in rural Nord-Aurdal Municipality, and losing his father in the 1920s. After studying he moved back to Nord-Aurdal, worked as an attorney and built the Labour Party organization in the region. The background formed him in that his main political goal was to improve the economy of dwellers in rural farming districts. He was a proponent of economic regulation, which marked his period as Minister of Finance. However, his period was also marked by the dominance of Erik Brofoss and the Ministry of Trade in deciding the country's overall financial policy. When Trygve Bratteli succeeded Meisdalshagen as Minister of Finance, the ministry regained its dominance, but also set out on a gradual deregulation. This, in addition to Meisdalshagen's discontent with increased spendings on defence, made him an oppositional figure within the Labour Party. He did return briefly to cabinet as Minister of Agriculture, and also cooperated with the government through the position as chairman of Norges Kooperative Landsforening, a national association of consumer co-operatives. However his oppositional tendencies grew stronger in his later life. He was a part of the "Easter Uprising" in 1958, and in 1958 and 1959 there were rumours of Meisdalshagen worked behind the scene to facilitate a change of personnel—and policy—in the Labour Party. His death came in this period.

== Early life and career ==
=== Early life and education ===
Meisdalshagen was born on 17 March 1903 in Nord-Aurdal Municipality as a son of smallholder and joiner Ole Meisdalshagen and Marit Myren. The family lived at the former crofter's farm Hagen in Skrautvål. Meisdalshagen attended Valdres Folk High School from 1920 to 1921, and took secondary education at Vossavangen between 1921 and 1925 with financial support from his brothers; his father died in 1924. Meisdalshagen took the examen artium in 1925, and enrolled in law studies at the Royal Frederick University (now: University of Oslo). While studying he was involved in the students' branch of Noregs Mållag. He came also under the influence of the revolutionary group Mot Dag, though he was never a member. He graduated from university with a cand.jur. degree in 1932.

=== Pre-war political career ===
Meisdalshagen became involved in politics while attending school in Voss, and chaired the Labour Party chapter in Nord-Aurdal from 1927 to 1940. He also chaired the local chapters of Valdres, from 1930 to 1932, and Fagernes, from 1931 to 1934. From 1931 to 1940 he was a board member of the Labour Party county chapter. He was elected as a member of the municipal council of Nord-Aurdal Municipality in 1931, and was re-elected to serve until 1940. From 1934 he served in the council's executive committee. He spent his professional life in Fagernes, where he had opened an attorney's office in 1933. He also headed the municipal board of arbitration in debt matters, from 1935 to 1940. This had a significant influence on his further political career, in that he sought to improve the economy of rural Norwegian districts, especially through a centralized increase of farmers' income. He also favoured ensuring a low interest, preferably at 2,5%.

During the term 1934–1936 he served as a deputy representative to the Parliament of Norway from the constituency Oppland; in the election of 1936, he was elected to a regular seat in the parliament. He was the youngest member of Parliament at the time.

=== World War II ===
As the Parliament amended the Constitution in 1938 to introduce four-year terms instead of three-year terms, the representatives elected in 1936 were still active in 1940. On 9 April that year, Norway was invaded and occupied by Germany as a part of World War II. With the German invasion, a radio broadcast coup d'état by Vidkun Quisling followed, and German diplomat Curt Bräuer was sent to Norway to demand the abdication of the Norwegian King Haakon VII and Nygaardsvold's Cabinet. This was initially refused, as the Parliament, meeting at Elverum on 9 April, issued the Elverum Authorization where it empowered the King and government to continue representing Norway. Norway and Germany was at war that time, and fighting continued for some months. However, when mainland Norway capitulated on 10 June 1940, new negotiations with Nazi Germany were opened, resulting in a request being submitted from the Presidium of the Parliament of Norway to the now-exiled King and government to abdicate. The case had been controversial, splitting the parliamentary group of the Labour Party. Olav Meisdalshagen agreed that the King should abdicate, as did the majority of the parliamentary group. When the King broadcast his refusal to abdicate via BBC Radio on 8 July 1940, this became famous as "The King's No".

Germany gradually tightened the grip of Norwegian society, and the Parliament became defunct during the rest of the German occupation of Norway. In 1941 Meisdalshagen became a prominent figure in the Norwegian resistance movement against German rule, in the position of district leader of Milorg in Valdres. In 1944 he left Norway and fled to Sweden, where he was a secretary at Flyktningskontoret in Stockholm until 1945. Briefly in 1945 he served as an advisor in London for the coordination of Milorg cells.

== Post-war career ==
=== First post-war years ===
In the first parliamentary election after the war, in 1945, Meisdalshagen was re-elected for a second term in Parliament. It was not clear that he would be nominated for the ballot, as this was not at all usual for those Labour Party members who in the summer of 1940 had agreed to the King's abdication. However, Meisdalshagen's service in Milorg probably tipped the scales in his favour. He was a member of the Standing Committee on Finance and Customs and secretary of the Preparatory Credentials Committee, and also became a member of the Standing Committee on Justice in December 1946. Meisdalshagen was also board chairman of the Norwegian State Housing Bank from 1946 to 1953.

=== Minister of Finance ===
Midway through his four-year term, Meisdalshagen was appointed Minister of Finance in Gerhardsen's Second Cabinet. He served from 6 December 1947 to 19 November 1951, when Torp's Cabinet was formed. Prime Minister Einar Gerhardsen and former party secretary Martin Tranmæl were the architects behind his appointment. Ultimately, Meisdalshagen's opposition to the Labour Party's foreign and defence policy in general, and extraordinary monetary grants for defence measures specifically, was cited as the reason for his resignation from the cabinet, and even for the entire cabinet shift. During his period as minister, Meisdalshagen's parliamentary seat was occupied by Gunnar Kalrasten until June 1948 and then by Thorvald Ulsnæs. He was succeeded as Minister of Finance by Trygve Bratteli; other candidates were discussed but rejected, including Meisdalshagen's old acquaintance Klaus Sunnanå.

As a politician, Meisdalshagen has been noted as being an opposite figure to his predecessor as Minister of Finance, Erik Brofoss. Still, earlier in 1947 he had argued strongly in favour of "Lex Brofoss", the law proposed by Brofoss which meant that the elected politicians gave temporary authority to the Norwegian Price Directorate to regulate the economy. Meisdalshagen even stated that a majority in Parliament probably agreed that such a law should have permanent effect, not be renewed from time to time. Historian Einar Lie has stated that Brofoss left Meisdalshagen in charge of the price policy with a "very easy heart". On the other hand, the new Ministry of Trade, where Brofoss was appointed as Minister, clearly became more important than the Ministry of Finance in this period. The higher importance of the Ministry of Trade ended after 1951, and Meisdalshagen's period was thus an exception in the history of the Ministry of Finance. Meisdalshagen was ultimately criticized by Brofoss for "lack of economical insight", and he also ran afoul with Central Bank of Norway Governor Gunnar Jahn.

According to Prime Minister Einar Gerhardsen, it took long to persuade Meisdalshagen to even take the post as Minister of Finance, and he was more interested in agro-economical questions than traditional planning of the economy. It was even said that Gerhardsen's Cabinet had an interest in luring Meisdalshagen away from the Parliament, where he had driven through significant increases in farmer's income, threatening the overall balance and planning of the state finances. In fact the income from farming, measured in the amount of money earned per decare, was doubled between the war's end in 1945 and 1950, when the Main Agreement for Agriculture, Hovedavtalen for jordbruket, was introduced. It regulated future price negotiations, and institutionalized the negotiating partners: the state on one side of the table, the Norwegian Agrarian Association and the Norwegian Farmers and Smallholders Union on the other.

During Meisdalshagen's time the lines between various parts of government were somewhat blurred. When the state budget was presented by the cabinet, and subsequently treated by the standing committees of the Parliament, committee members would contact the Ministry of Finance directly to ask whether a proposed budgetary change was feasible (after Meisdalshagen's resignation this practice was altered, in that the contact was initiated by the Labour Party committee fraction, not by the committee as a whole). Meisdalshagen also became known for nontraditional arrangements when it came to the Ministry's bureaucrats: assistant secretary Egil Lothe, who had a "very good relationship" with Meisdalshagen, doubled as assistant secretary and State Secretary from 1948 until Meisdalshagen's resignation in 1951. Such a double role, where a person was both bureaucrat and politician at the same time, was very uncommon, probably unique. Lothe was not formally appointed, either, and thus does not appear on historical lists of state secretaries. According to Einar Lie, there was no clear division of tasks between Meisdalshagen and Lothe when it came to the Ministry's daily work. In addition to Lothe, the consultant Karl Trasti, another friend of Meisdalshagen, had influence in this period, especially in budgetary questions.

=== Return to Parliament ===
Since 1913, parliamentarians who are appointed to the cabinet may return to Parliament later, provided that the four-year term has not expired. After leaving as Minister of Finance, Meisdalshagen returned to Parliament as a member of the Standing Committee on Finance and Customs, which he even chaired from January 1952 to January 1953. While being Minister of Finance, Meisdalshagen had been re-elected on the Labour Party parliamentary ticket in 1949, and was elected for a fourth time in 1953. He was still a member of the Standing Committee on Finance and Customs. On 22 January 1955 the Gerhardsen's Third Cabinet was formed, and Meisdalshagen served as Minister of Agriculture until 14 May 1956. During this period his parliamentary seat was occupied by Per Mellesmo. Meisdalshagen then returned to Parliament, this time as a member of the now-defunct Standing Committee on Agriculture. He was elected for a fifth time in 1957. This time, he became a member of the Standing Committee on Foreign Affairs and Defence as well as the Enlarged Committee on Foreign Affairs and Defence. From 1957 to 1959 he was also a member of the Labour Party's central committee (sentralstyre).

Meisdalshagen was also chairman of the Norges Kooperative Landsforening (NKL) from 1952 to his death. NKL was the national association of consumer co-operatives. This way, he represented trade interests in meetings with the government, at the same time as being a parliament member.

=== Internal opposition ===
Meisdalshagen was regarded as an internal opponent of the Labour Party's foreign affairs and defence policy. His obituarist in Verdens Gang writes that he was "more controversial in his own party than outside of it". This tendency had surfaced already in the 1940s, when he very reluctantly accepted the Norwegian signing of the North Atlantic Treaty. Meisdalshagen remained skeptic to a non-neutral foreign policy in the 1950s, and in February 1951 a conflict with Minister of Defence Jens Chr. Hauge arose. Meisdalshagen formally dissented against a proposal to grant an extra 250 million kr to the Norwegian Armed Forces for the years 1951 and 1952, and he became furious when he entered a budgetary debate without being notified of a certain press release, issued by Jens Chr. Hauge, where another grant of NOK 125 million was declared. According to Haakon Lie, Meisdalshagen influenced persons in the newspaper Oppland Arbeiderblad to write and print an editorial titled La Hauge gå ("Let Hauge Go"). Meisdalshagen was a member of the board of Oppland Arbeiderblad from 1945 to 1957, and had spent some time working there before the war.

Meisdalshagen was also discontented with the deregulation policy to which the Labour Party gradually adhered in the 1950s. Trygve Bratteli, on the other hand, was viewed as a proponent of gradual deregulation. In November 1958 there were rumours that Meisdalshagen would return to the cabinet, probably as Minister of Transport of Communications. Some believed that Meisdalshagen worked together with Karl Trasti to have Trygve Bratteli removed from the cabinet; Trasti would succeed Bratteli as Minister of Finance, according to the rumour, with was told to Bratteli by Meisdalshagen's predecessor as Minister of Agriculture, Rasmus Nordbø. At the time Karl Trasti was a member of the ad-hoc Paulson Committee, which worked with questions regarding the Ministry of Finance's policy. It was thought that some of the committee's policy proposals could be undesirable to Bratteli, and thereby compromise his minister position. This information was given to Trygve Bratteli from parliamentary secretary Haakon Bingen in January 1959. Binge had heard it from Egil Lothe, at the time a deputy under-secretary of state in the Ministry of Finance. A friend of Meisdalshagen, Lothe was thereby tied to the alleged intriguers. Jens Haugland noted the scheme of Trasti and Meisdalshagen in his diary, and that this caused Bratteli to keep himself "in the background". This was a part of a broader schism in the party, where Meisdalshagen was the "strongest man in the group" consisting of parliamentarians who deviated in questions of foreign policy: Finn Moe, Trygve Bull, Hans Offerdal, Sverre Løberg and Meisdalshagen. Meisdalshagen had been a supporter of the "Easter Uprising" of 1958, a voicing of dissent within the Labour Party, where the socialist students' association gained the signatures of Labour MPs on a NATO-critical resolution. In Meisdalshagen's obituary, he was likened to Olav Oksvik, another NATO-critical Labour politician.

Halfway through his fifth term in Parliament, on 21 November 1959, Meisdalshagen suffered from a sudden indisposition after a parliamentary speech. He was hospitalized, but died later that same day. The cause of death was intracranial hemorrhage. In Parliament he was replaced by Per Mellesmo, who advanced from deputy to regular representative. He was biographized in 1982 by Nils Oddvar Bergheim.

Political offices
Preceded by Erik Brofoss	Norwegian Minister of Finance; 1947–1951	Succeeded by Trygve Bratteli
Preceded by Rasmus Nordbø	Norwegian Minister of Agriculture; 1955–1956	Succeeded by Harald Johan Løbak
