= Rasmus Nordbø =

Norwegian politician

Minister of Agriculture
- In office 19 November 1951 – 22 January 1955
- Prime Minister: Oscar Torp
- Preceded by: Kristian Fjeld
- Succeeded by: Olav Meisdalshagen

State Secretary for the Ministry of Agriculture
- In office 19 March 1948 – 19 November 1951
- Prime Minister: Einar Gerhardsen
- Minister: Kristian Fjeld

Personal details
- Born: Rasmus Mathias Nordbø; 5 February 1915 Førde, Sogn og Fjordane, Norway
- Died: 23 February 1983 (aged 68)
- Party: Labour

Rasmus Mathias Nordbø (5 February 1915 – 23 February 1983) was a Norwegian administrator and government minister. He served as state secretary to the Minister of Agriculture in the second cabinet of Einar Gerhardsen (1948-1951), and later himself as Minister of Agriculture in the cabinet of Oscar Torp (1951-1955).

Later Nordbø was County Minister of Agriculture for Sogn og Fjordane from 1955 to 1964, when he was given the same post for the county of Vestfold. He also served as a member of the municipal council of Førde Municipality.
