= Romsdal Folkeblad =

Norwegian newspaper

Romsdal Folkeblad was a Norwegian Labor Party newspaper published in Molde from 1928 until its bankruptcy in 1987. Its circulation was just under 5,000.

Launched in 1928, the paper was one of several local newspapers started up in the 1920s. The politician Olav Oksvik was one of the central figures in launching the newspaper. Romsdal Folkeblad was shut down by the Nazi authorities during the German occupation of Norway in the Second World War, and its competitor Romsdals Budstikke came under Nazi control. In the 1970s, the editorial board was based at the town hall in Molde, but relocated to more modern premises in Årødalen around 1980. In the late 1970s, Romsdals Budstikke won the upper hand in the local circulation war, and Romsdal Folkeblad shut down in 1987.
