= Ole Kristian Hafnor =

Norwegian politician

- Born: 15 April 1882; Modum Municipality, Norway
- Died: 5 August 1962 (aged 80)
- Occupations: Factory owner Newspaper editor Politician

Ole Kristian Hafnor (15 April 1882 – 5 August 1962) was a Norwegian factory owner, newspaper editor and politician.

He was born in Modum Municipality to wheel-maker Christen Nilsen Hafnor and Anna Dorthea Jensdatter. From 1910 to 1922 he was running a lorry factory in Solum Municipality. He was chief editor of the newspaper Telemark Arbeiderblad from 1926 to 1928. He was elected representative to the Storting for the period 1928–1930, for the Labour Party. He died in 1962.
