= Thorvald Ulsnæs =

Norwegian politician (born 1940)

Thorvald Ulsnæs (16 May 1887 – 27 June 1982) was a Norwegian politician for the Labour Party.

He was born in Gran Municipality. Following basic education, he was a painter's apprentice from 1904 and painter from 1907. From 1924 to 1950 he was a master painter in the Norwegian State Railways. Buying a small farm in 1922, Ulsnæs also served as deputy chair of Oppland Farmers and Smallholders Union from 1930 to 1953.

However, he was mainly active in the Labour Party. He was elected to the municipal council of Brandbu Municipality in 1916 and continuously re-elected until the Second World War. From 1925 to 1931 he served as deputy mayor, and from 1934 to 1940 he served as mayor. His tenure was cut short by the German occupation of Norway. After the war, in 1945 he briefly served as mayor until elections could be held. He chaired Brandbu Labour Party and was a national board member of the Labour Party from 1949 to 1953.

He was elected as a deputy representative to the Parliament of Norway from Oppland for the terms 1945–1949 and 1950–1953. He was a regular member from June 1948 to November 1951, filling the seat of Olav Meisdalshagen who was a member of Gerhardsen's Second Cabinet. Ulsnæs sat on the Standing Committee on Health until January 1950, then the Standing Committee on Finance and Customs. In total, Ulsnæs met during 3 years and 195 days of parliamentary session.

Ulsnæs was awarded the King's Medal of Merit in silver in 1969.
