= Peder Johan Pedersen Holmesland =

Norwegian politician (1833–1914)

Peder Johan Pedersen Holmesland (January 4th, 1833 – May 1, 1914) was a Norwegian politician for the Liberal Party.

== Early life and family ==
He was born in Holme in 1833 as the youngest brother of Søren Pedersen Jaabæk and Simon Pedersen Holmesland, who would both sit in the Norwegian Parliament. So did his nephew Peter Karl Holmesland.

== Political career ==
Peder Johan Pedersen Holmesland was himself elected to the Norwegian Parliament in 1880, representing the rural constituency of Lister og Mandals Amt. He worked as a farmer there. He was re-elected in 1883, 1886, and 1889, the last time for the Moderate Liberal Party, a breakaway fraction from the Liberal Party.

== Personal life ==
He married a Regine Wold.
