= Tiden (Arendal newspaper) =

Norwegian local newspaper

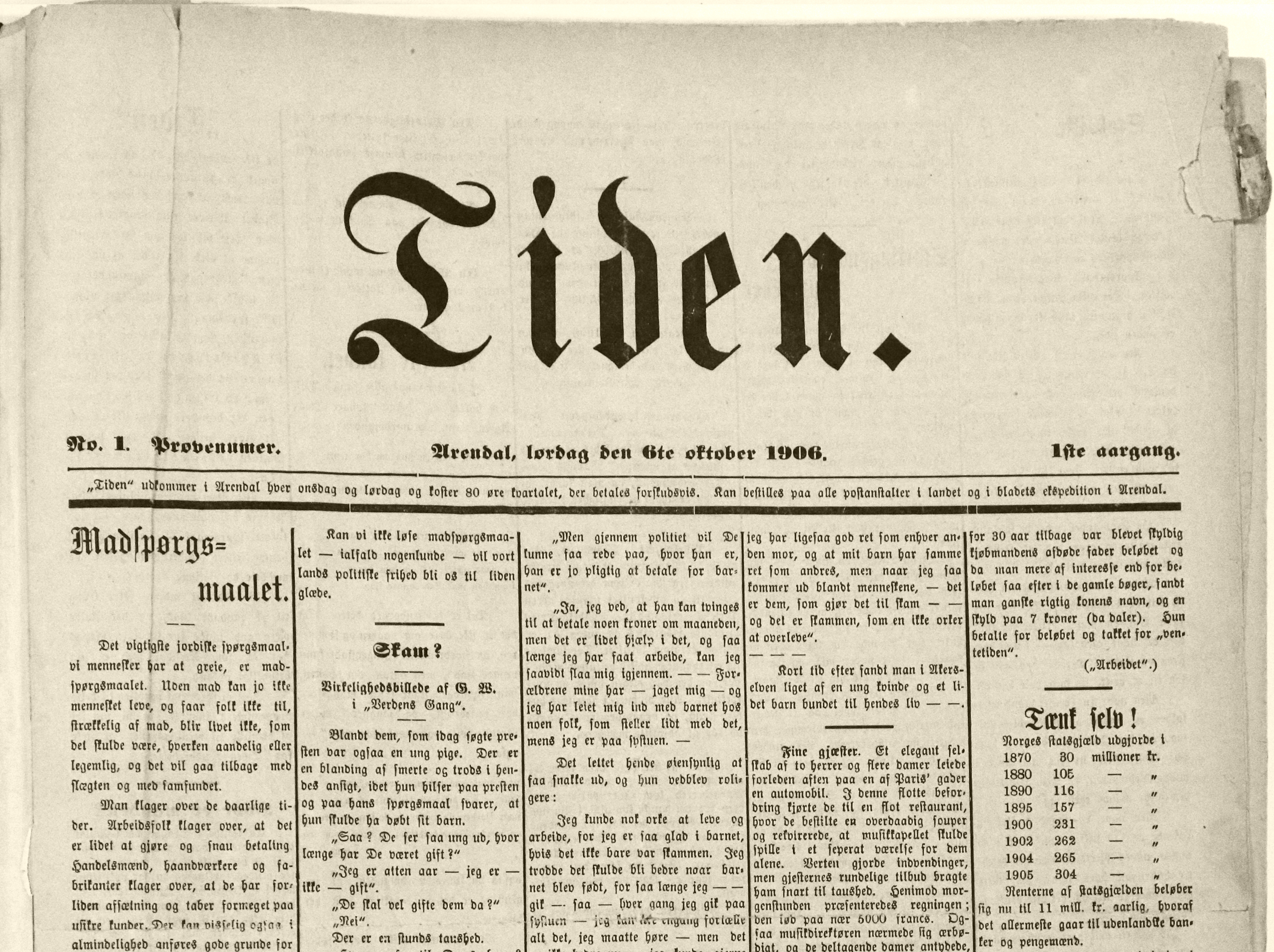
First issue, 6 October 1906.

Tiden (lit. 'The Time') was a newspaper in Arendal, Norway that was historically aligned with the Labour Party.

The newspaper was privately established by Mikael Bie in 1906. It was taken over by the Labour Party in Nedenes Amt (Nedenes was later renamed Aust-Agder) in 1908 and became the countywide newspaper covering news from a Labour standpoint. Later, the Labour Party also chose Tiden as the name of their publishing house.

After Mikael Bie resigned as editor-in-chief in 1916, the newspaper was among others edited by politician Ola Solberg. During the occupation of Norway by Nazi Germany, the authorities clamped down on Tiden and stopped its publication in 1941. Tiden resumed on 15 May 1945.

As the circulation reached 5,173 copies in 1961, it dropped below 3,000 by 1970 and stood at 2,726 in 1979 before being discontinued in 1982.
