= Simon Pedersen Holmesland =

Norwegian politician

Simon Pedersen Holmesland (29 July 1823 – 11 January 1895) was a Norwegian politician.

He was born Holme in 1823 as the younger brother of Søren Pedersen Jaabæk, who would sit in the Norwegian Parliament from 1845 to 1890. His youngest brother Peder Johan Pedersen Holmesland also became a politician.

Simon Pedersen Holmesland was himself elected to the Norwegian Parliament in 1874, and re-elected in 1877, representing the rural constituency of Lister og Mandals Amt. He worked as a bailiff there.

He married Maren Sørine Olsdatter, and their son Peter Karl Holmesland became a politician too, so did Peter's son Eilif Løvrak Holmesland.
