= Asbjørn Bodahl =

Norwegian artistic gymnast

- Born: 20 April 1896 Sarpsborg, United Kingdoms of Sweden and Norway
- Died: 21 December 1962 (aged 66) Sarpsborg, Norway

Gymnastics career
- Discipline: Men's artistic gymnastics
- Country represented: Norway
- Club: Turn- og Idrettslaget National
Medal record
Men's artistic gymnastics
Representing Norway
Olympic Games
Silver medal – second place	1920 Antwerp	Team, free system

Asbjørn Bodahl (20 April 1896 – 21 December 1962) was a Norwegian gymnast who competed in the 1920 Summer Olympics. He was part of the Norwegian team, which won the silver medal in the gymnastics men's team, free system event.
