= Johanne Reutz Gjermoe =

Norwegian economist and politician

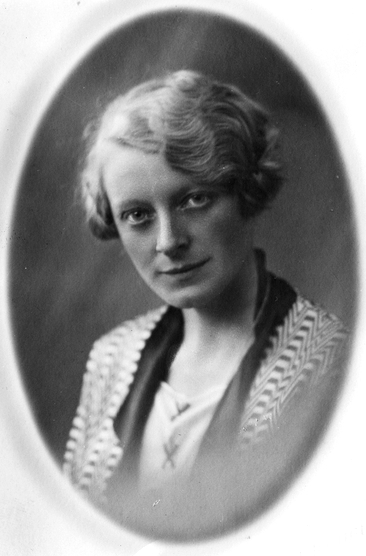
Johanne Reutz Gjermoe, c. 1933

Johanne Reutz Gjermoe ( 4 January 1896 – 4 February 1989) was a Norwegian economist and politician, a proponent for women's rights and peace activist. She was born in Bergen. She chaired the office of statistics at the Norwegian Confederation of Trade Unions from 1925. From 1935 to 1938 she was a delegate to the League of Nations. She was decorated with the King's Medal of Merit for her peace works. A biography of her was published in 2001.
