= Jørgen Leonard Firing =

Norwegian politician (1894–1977)

Jørgen Leonard Firing (9 March 1894 – 7 March 1977) was a Norwegian shipbuilding engineer and politician for the Conservative Party.

== Early life and career ==
He was born in Horten.

He was elected to the Norwegian Parliament from the Market towns of Vestfold county for 1945–1949. After this, he was director of the naval shipyard at Karljohansvern 1948–1960. He worked at this shipyard from 1920, serving as technical director from 1942.

On the local level, Firing was a member of the municipal council of Horten Municipality from 1925 to 1931 and 1947 to 1963. He was a member of the board of the local newspaper from 1945 to 1965 and the local savings bank from 1951 to 1965.

He fought for the British Empire in the First World War. For this he received the British War Medal and the Allied Victory Medal.
