= Snefrid Eriksmoen =

Norwegian politician (1894–1954)

Snefrid Eriksmoen (20 August 1894 – 25 May 1954) was a Norwegian politician for the Conservative Party.

She was born in Brandval Municipality. She served as a deputy representative to the Norwegian Parliament from Buskerud during the terms 1945–1949 and 1950–1953. During the first term, for some months in 1949, she met as a regular representative, replacing Gudbrand Bernhardsen Tandberg who died.

Eriksmoen was a member of the municipal council for Lier Municipality from 1936 to 1940.
