= Anton Marius Jenssen =

Norwegian merchant and politician

- Born: 27 November 1879; Herning, Denmark
- Died: 25 July 1967 (aged 87)
- Occupations: Merchant; Politician

Anton Marius Jenssen (27 November 1879 – 25 July 1967) was a Norwegian merchant and politician.

He was born in Herning, Denmark to mill owner Anders Christen Jensen and Else Kirstine Olesen. He emigrated to Norway in 1894, and settled first in Horten, and from 1901 as merchant in Tønsberg. He was elected representative to the Storting for the periods 1925–1927, 1928–1930, 1931–1933, 1934–1936 and 1937–1945, for the Labour Party. He was member of the municipal council of Tønsberg Municipality from 1910 to 1936.
