= Søren Berg Sørensen Moen =

Norwegian politician

Søren Berg Sørensen Moen (17 March 1899 – 16 May 1946) was a Norwegian politician for the Labour Party.

He was elected to the Norwegian Parliament from Troms in 1945, but he died less than one year into the term. He was replaced by Peder Nikolai Leier Jacobsen. Moen had previously served in the position of deputy representative during the terms 1934–1936 and 1937–1945.

Moen was born in Lenvik and was a member of the executive committee of the municipal council of Lenvik Municipality from 1925 to 1934, served as mayor during the terms 1934–1937 and 1937–1940 and was a regular council member from 1940 to 1946.
