= Peter Johan Støren =

Norwegian operating manager and politician

Peter Johan Støren (13 May 1859 – 5 December 1925) was a Norwegian operating manager and politician.

Støren was born in Spydeberg to parish priest Abraham Wilhelm Støren and Lagertha Johanne Dircks . He was operating manager of the Telemark Canal from 1902. He was elected representative to the Stortinget from the Market towns of Telemark and Aust-Agder counties for the periods 1922–1924 and 1925–1927, for the Conservative Party.
