= Gudbrand Bernhardsen Tandberg =

Norwegian politician

Personal details
- Born: May 24, 1903
- Died: June 2, 1949 (aged 46)
- Political party: Conservative Party
- Profession: Politician

Gudbrand Bernhardsen Tandberg (24 May 1903 – 2 June 1949) was a Norwegian politician for the Conservative Party.

He was born in Nes, Buskerud.

He was elected to the Norwegian Parliament from Buskerud in 1945, but died in the last year of the term. He was replaced by Snefrid Eriksmoen.

Tandberg was a member of the executive committee of Nes municipality council in the periods 1936–1937, 1937–1940 and 1945–1946.
