= Sigurd Christian Brinch =

Norwegian politician (1874–1956)

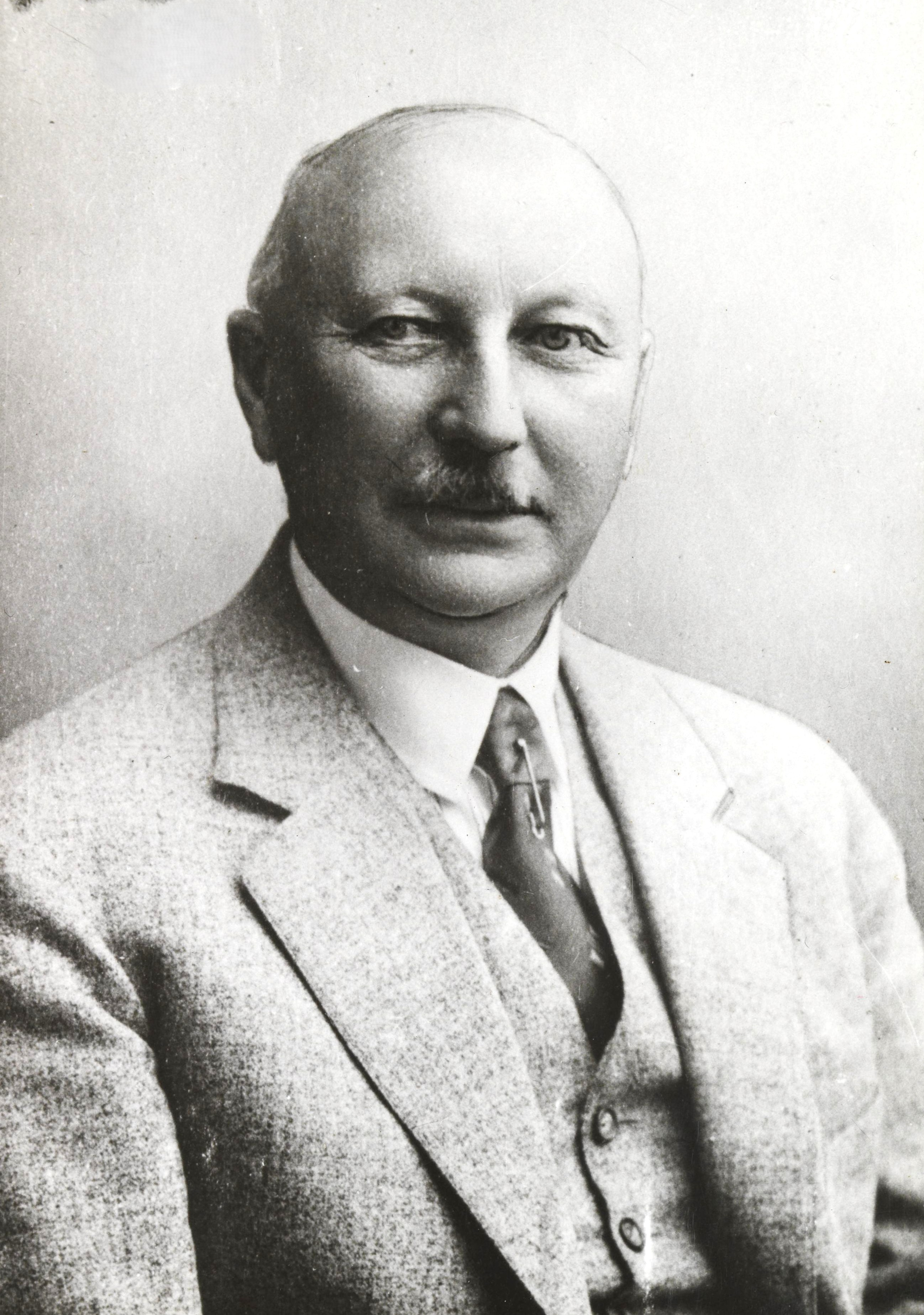

Sigurd Christian Brinch (3 October 1874 – 1956) was a Norwegian manager and politician.

Brinch was born in Christiania to Johan Christian Hønen and Michaline Beate Flisager. He was director of the energy company Arendals Fossekompani from 1912, and resided in Arendal. He was elected representative to the Stortinget for the periods 1934–1936 and 1937–1945, for the Conservative Party. He died in 1956.
