= Aslak Nilsen =

Norwegian politician

- Born: 8 December 1898; Kragerø, Norway
- Died: 26 September 1952 (aged 53)
- Occupation: Politician
- Political party: Labour Party

Aslak Nilsen (8 December 1898 – 26 September 1952) was a Norwegian politician.

He was born in Kragerø to Knut Andreas Nilsen and Karen Thorbjørnsen. He was elected representative to the Storting for the periods 1934–1936 and 1937–1945, for the Labour Party.
