= Fremover =

Norwegian newspaper

- Owner: Amedia (100%)
- Founded: 1903
- Headquarters: Narvik, Norway
- Website: fremover.no

Fremover is a regional newspaper published in Narvik, Norway. It has been published for more than 100 years, having been founded on May 27, 1903.

Fremover, which has no party affiliation, is read daily by approx. 29,000 people. Each edition has approximately 30 pages, and the current editor-in-chief is Anders Horne. Translated into English, its name means "Forward".
