= Bratsberg-Demokraten =

Norwegian newspaper

Bratsberg-Demokraten ("The Bratsberg Democrat") was a Norwegian newspaper, published in Skien in Telemark county. From 1924 to 1929 it was named Telemark Kommunistblad.

Bratsberg-Demokraten was started on 7 April 1908, as the Labour Party needed an organ in the county Telemark (then named Bratsberg). On 10 January 1921 it was merged with Nybrott to form Folkets Dagblad, a regional newspaper for both Telemark and Vestfold, but the merger was reversed after 19 May 1922. Bratsberg-Demokraten continued.

In 1923 it was usurped by the Communist Party of Norway. It changed name from 2 January 1924 to Telemark Kommunistblad. It lasted until 28 June 1929, and was survived by Labour's Telemark Arbeiderblad.

Eivind Reiersen was a noted editor, holding the post from 1919 to 1921 (a bit into the Folkets Dagblad period) and from 1924 to 1928.
