= Eivind Kristoffer Eriksen =

Norwegian politician (1893–1949)

Eivind Kristoffer Eriksen (18 November 1893 – 8 August 1949) was a Norwegian politician for the Labour Party.

He was born in Gjøvik.

He was elected to the Norwegian Parliament from Vestfold in 1945, but he died before the end of the term. He was replaced by Marie Ingeborg Skau.

Outside politics he worked as a mechanic. He was involved in the local labour union.
