= Karl Eugen Hammerstedt =

Norwegian politician

Karl Eugen Hammerstedt (19 May 1903 – 28 December 1960) was a Norwegian politician for the Communist Party.

He was elected to the Norwegian Parliament from the Market towns of Telemark and Aust-Agder counties in 1945, but was not re-elected in 1949 as the Communist Party dropped from 11 to 0 seats in Parliament.

Markussen was born in Porsgrunn and was a member of the Porsgrunn city council during the terms 1934–1937 and 1937–1940.
