= Kristian Albert Christiansen =

Norwegian politician (1888–1966)

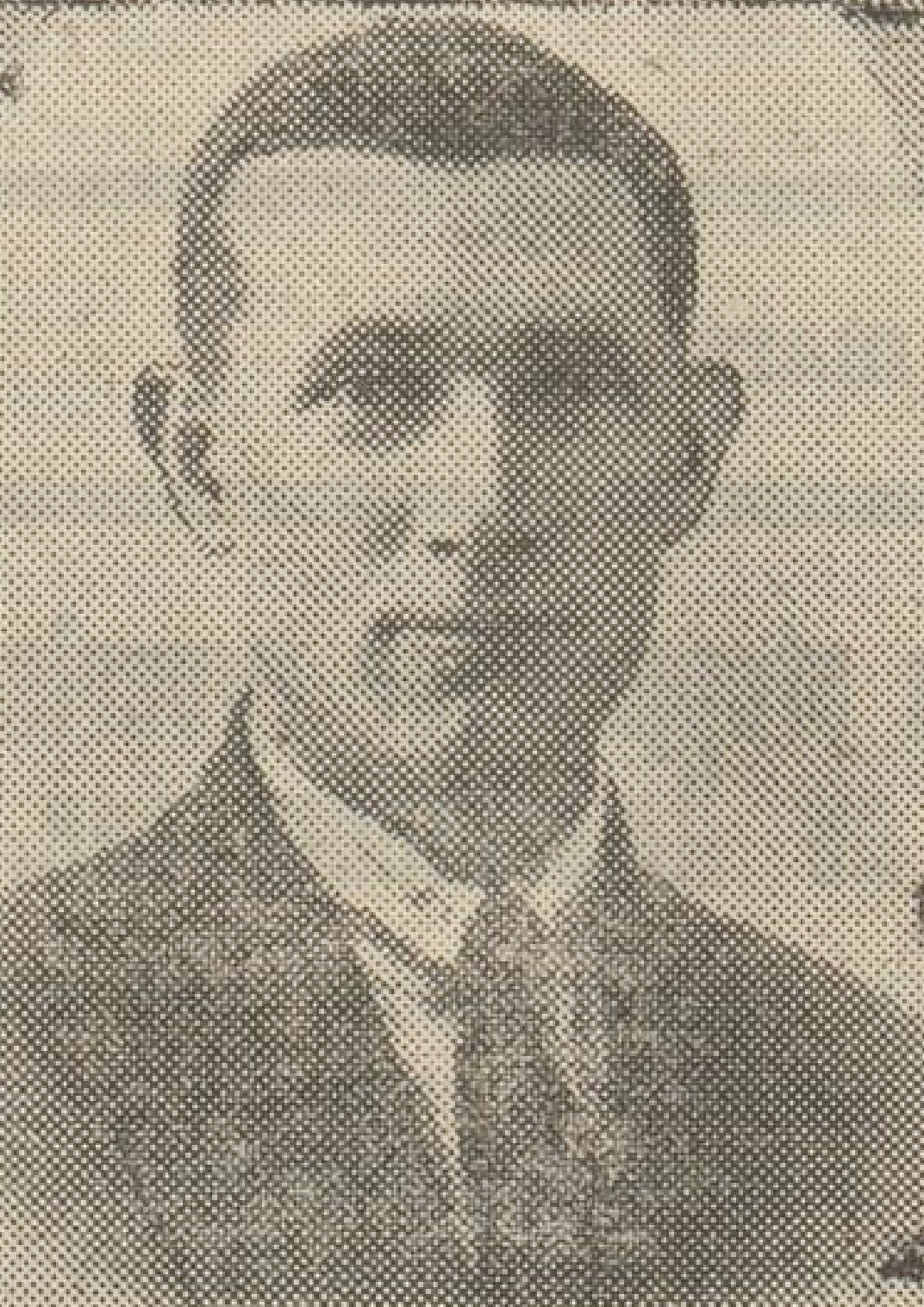
- Kristian Albert Christiansen (1888–1966).
- Born: 1 January 1888; Larvik, Norway
- Died: 10 October 1966 (aged 78)
- Occupation: Politician

Kristian Albert Christiansen (1 January 1888 – 10 October 1966) was a Norwegian politician.

He was born in Larvik to saw mill worker Olaus Christiansen and Anne Helene Andersen. He was elected representative to the Storting for the periods 1928–1930, 1934–1936 and 1937–1945, for the Labour Party.
