= Johannes Pettersen Løkke =

Norwegian politician

Johannes Pettersen Løkke (28 January 1895 – 14 March 1988) was a Norwegian politician for the Labour Party.

He was born in Kristiania. He was elected to the Norwegian Parliament from the Market towns of Telemark and Aust-Agder counties in 1950, but was not re-elected in 1954. Instead he served the next term in the position of deputy representative.

Løkke was a member of the municipal council of Notodden Municipality from 1937 to 1969, serving as mayor in the periods 1945–1947, 1947–1951 and 1951–1954.
