= Marie Skau =

Norwegian politician

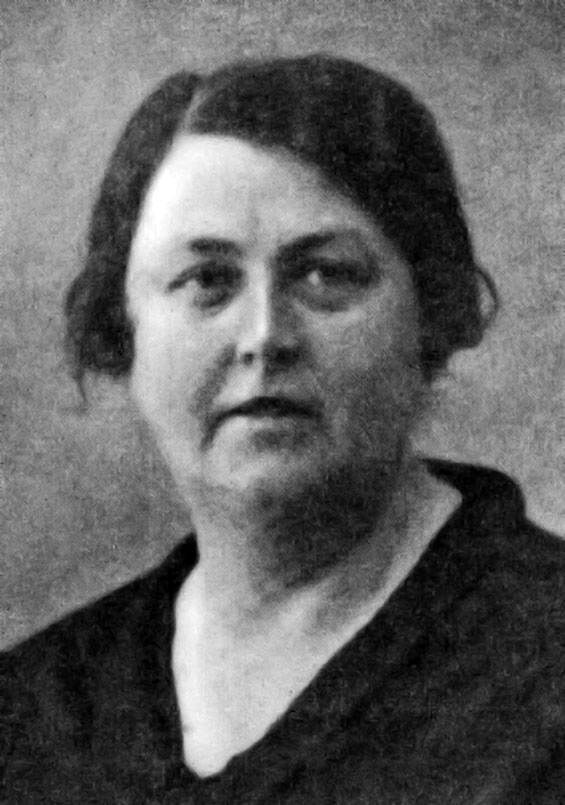
Marie Ingeborg Skau

Marie Ingeborg Skau (10 July 1890 – 20 August 1966) was a Norwegian politician for the Labour Party.

She started her political career in the socialist youth organization "Karl Marx" in Horten. She was especially active in the Labour Party women's movement. Representing Borre, she served as a deputy representative to the Parliament of Norway from Vestfold during the terms 1937–1945, 1945–1949 and 1950–1953. During the second term, for some months in 1949, she met as a regular representative, replacing Eivind Kristoffer Eriksen who died.
