= Carl Henry (politician) =

Norwegian politician (1905–1995)

Carl Henry (17 November 1905 – 2 December 1995) was a Norwegian politician for the Labour Party.

Henry was born in Kristiania as a son of baker Carl Jacobsen and Helga Elise Pedersen. He attended upper secondary school for four years, studying both sciences and commerce, the latter in Sandefjord. Henry also attended the Nordic folk high school in Geneva. He was a journalist by occupation, starting in 1929. In 1930, Henry was promoted to subeditor in the newspaper Nybrott in Larvik. From 1935 to 1952, he was the newspaper's manager. During the occupation of Norway by Nazi Germany, Nybrott was stopped briefly in August 1940, and after being resumed, it was merged with the bourgeois Østlands-Posten to form Larvik Dagblad from 1 July 1943. The two editors-in-chief Ingjald Nordstad and Øyvind Næss were arrested on 8 December 1943, and Henry replaced them for the rest of the war.

The time as newspaper editor under Nazi rule did not hurt Henry's career, as he was elected to the Parliament of Norway from the Market towns of Vestfold county in 1945. He was not re-elected in 1948, but served as a deputy representative during the terms 1950–1953 and 1954–1957, and met as a regular representative from 1951 to 1955 meanwhile Oscar Torp was Prime Minister.

Henry was a member of the municipal council of Larvik Municipality from 1951 to 1967, from 1961 to 1966 in the executive committee. He also chaired the school board, and chaired the local Bank of Norway branch from 1960 to 1968. Henry worked with taxation in Larvik from 1956 to 1966, then as an office manager in the Norwegian Association of the Blind and Partially Sighted from 1966 to 1972.

Henry was a board member of Én Verden (affiliated with the World Federalist Movement/Institute for Global Policy) from 1947 to 1953, the Norwegian Peace Council from 1953 to 1977 and the Norwegian Refugee Council from 1953 to 1977. He was also involved in the temperance movement.
