= Anton Alexander (politician) =

Norwegian educator and politician

Anton Alexander (19 September 1870 – 10 October 1945) was a Norwegian educator and politician for the Liberal Party.

He was born in Tvedestrand as the son of sailor Alexander Paulsen (1841-1871) and his wife Anna Andersen (1834-1887). He graduated as cand.real. in 1892, and studied mathematics in Leipzig from 1894 to 1895. Over his career he mainly worked as a school teacher and principal; in Kristiania, Bodø, Skien, Kristiania again, Lillehammer, Drammen and Skien again.

Involved in local politics, he was a member of the municipal council of Skien Municipality from 1910 to 1914 and of the city council of Lillehammer Municipality from 1928. He was elected to the Norwegian Parliament for the term 1934–1936, representing the Market towns of Telemark and Aust-Agder counties.

He authored numerous articles and books. He also assisted in the polar expeditions of Fridtjof Nansen, Otto Sverdrup and Roald Amundsen, as well as Gunnar Isachsen's expedition to Svalbard, with astronomical calculations.
