= Alfred Trønsdal =

Norwegian politician (1896–1953)

Alfred Trønsdal

Alfred Olav Trønsdal (14 October 1896 – 1953) was a Norwegian politician for the Labour Party.

He joined his first trade union in 1911, and joined the Labour Party in 1913. He was a manager for Norges Socialdemokratiske Ungdomsforbund and Klassekampen from 1920, and in Østfold Arbeiderblad from 1924 to 1928. In 1928 he was hired as a secretary in the Union of Employees in Commerce and Offices in Trondheim. From 1922 to 1923 he chaired Oslo Arbeidersamfund. In 1929 he unsuccessfully applied for the job as manager in Trondhjems Kooperative Bygge- og Boligselskap.

Trønsdal was first elected to Trondheim city council in 1932. With the political situation disrupted by the German occupation of Norway from 1940 to 1945, Trønsdal was selected by the County Governor of Sør-Trøndelag to serve in the temporary city council following the liberation of Norway in May 1945. From 1947 to 1950 he served as deputy mayor.

As a part of the rebuilding of post-occupation of Norway, a housing cooperative Trondheim og Omegn Bolig- og Byggelag was established in December 1945. Trønsdal became the first chairman of its board. From 1950 to his death in 1953 he worked as teknisk rådmann, a director position in the city administration. A road in Trondheim has been named after him.
