= Arthur Rydstrøm =

Norwegian gymnast (1896–1986)

- Full name: Arthur Nicolai Rydstrøm
- Born: 9 February 1896 Glemmen, United Kingdoms of Sweden and Norway
- Died: 24 February 1986 (aged 90) Bergen, Norway

Gymnastics career
- Discipline: Men's artistic gymnastics
- Country represented: Norway
- Club: Turn- og Idrettslaget National
Medal record
Men's artistic gymnastics
Representing Norway
Olympic Games
Silver medal – second place	1920 Antwerp	Team, free system

Arthur Nicolai Rydstrøm (9 February 1896 – 24 February 1986) was a Norwegian gymnast who competed in the 1920 Summer Olympics. He was part of the Norwegian team, which won the gold medal in the gymnastics men's team, free system event.
