= Bernhard Berthelsen =

Norwegian politician (1897–1964)

Bernhard Berthelsen (16 March 1897 – 25 August 1964) was a Norwegian politician for the Liberal Party.

Berthelsen was born in Søndre Undal Municipality (later spelled Sør-Audnedal Municipality). He was elected to the Norwegian Parliament from the Market towns of Telemark and Aust-Agder counties in 1945, and was re-elected on one occasion.

Berthelsen was a deputy member of the executive committee of the municipal council of Arendal Municipality from 1934 to 1940. He then sat as a regular council member in the periods 1940–1944 and 1945–1946. He was later a member of the municipal council of Bergen Municipality during the term 1955–1959.
