= Sverre Hope =

Norwegian politician

Sverre Hope (4 April 1902 – 2 April 1966) was a Norwegian politician for the Conservative Party.

He was born in Vikør Municipality. He was elected to the Norwegian Parliament from Akershus in 1945, and was re-elected on one occasion.

Hope was a member of municipal council from Ski Municipality from 1951 to 1955 and 1959 to 1966.
