= Carl P. Wright =

Norwegian politician (1893–1961)

Carl August Petersen Wright (7 September 1893 – 28 April 1961) was a Norwegian politician for the Conservative Party.

He was born in Porsgrunn.

He was elected to the Norwegian Parliament from the Market towns of Telemark and Aust-Agder counties in 1937, and was re-elected on two occasions. He had previously served in the position of deputy representative during the term 1934–1936.

Wright held various positions in Porsgrunn city council between 1922 and 1927. He then served as deputy mayor for a brief time in 1928, and mayor in the periods 1931–1934 and 1934–1936.

His father Alfred P. Wright was also a Parliament member.

During the occupation of Norway by Nazi Germany he was imprisoned at Møllergata 19 from 20 October to 11 November 1941, then in Grini concentration camp until 21 November, then Møllergata 19 until 6 February 1942. He was then transferred to Ullevål Hospital, whence he escaped.

Wright was the nominator for George Marshall's 1953 Nobel Peace Prize -- the nomination was ultimately successful.
