= Johanne Samueline Pedersen =

Norwegian politician

Johanne Samueline Pedersen (15 March 1887 – 16 September 1961) was a Norwegian politician for the Labour Party.

She was born in Innvik Municipality in Western Norway. She was elected to the Norwegian Parliament from Hedmark in 1945, and was re-elected on one occasion. She had previously served in the position of deputy representative during the term 1937–1945.

Pedersen was a member of the municipal council for Brandval Municipality from 1934 to 1940 and 1945 to 1951.
