= Cato Andreas Sverdrup =

Norwegian politician

Cato Andreas Sverdrup (9 April 1896 – 9 April 1948) was a Norwegian politician for the Conservative Party.

He was born in Flakstad Municipality in Lofoten. He and his brother ran a fish export company S. & C. Sverdrup, inherited from their father, in the village of Reine. From 1942 to 1945, during the German occupation of Norway, Sverdrup did service in the Royal Norwegian Navy; reaching the rank of Captain Lieutenant.

He was elected to the Norwegian Parliament from Nordland in 1937, and was re-elected on one occasion. Three years into the latter term, he died and was replaced by Kristian Johan Bodøgaard. Sverdrup had previously served in the position of deputy representative during the term 1931–1933.

He was a member of the national party board from 1930 to his death, and of its central committee from 1934.
