= Kristian Johan Bodøgaard =

Norwegian politician (1885–1971)

Kristian Johan Bodøgaard (27 May 1885 – 12 December 1971) was a Norwegian politician for the Conservative Party.

He was born in Bodø landdistrikt.

He served in the position of deputy representative to the Norwegian Parliament from Nordland during the term 1945–1949. Three years into the term, he moved up as a regular representative as Cato Andreas Sverdrup died.

Outside politics he worked as a fisher and farmer. He chaired the local party chapter in Bodin Municipality from 1931 to 1960.
