= Ove Andersen (politician) =

Norwegian barrister, judge and politician

- Born: 5 May 1878; Arendal, Norway
- Died: 21 June 1928 (aged 50)
- Occupations: Barrister; Politician

Ove Andersen (5 May 1878 – 21 June 1928) was a Norwegian barrister, judge and politician.

He was born in Arendal to district stipendiary magistrate Ove Severin Andersen and Hildborg Elisabeth Conradi. He served as mayor of Arendal from 1919 to 1924. He was appointed district stipendiary magistrate of Nedenes District Court from 1926. He was elected representative to the Storting for the periods 1925–1927 and 1928–1930, for the Conservative Party.
