= Peder Nikolai Leier Jacobsen =

Norwegian politician

Vice President of the Odelsting
- In office 12 January 1953 – 30 September 1959
- President: C. J. Hambro
- Preceded by: Olav Oksvik
- Succeeded by: Jakob Martin Pettersen

Member of the Norwegian Parliament
- In office 1 January 1950 – 30 September 1961
- Constituency: Troms

Deputy Member of the Norwegian Parliament
- In office 4 December 1945 – 31 December 1949; Became permanent representative on 16 May 1946 after Søren Berg Sørensen Moen's death.
- Constituency: Troms

Personal details
- Born: 13 May 1888; Trondenes, Troms, Norway
- Died: 31 January 1967 (aged 78)
- Political party: Labour

Peder Nikolai Leier Jacobsen (13 May 1888 – 31 January 1967) is a Norwegian politician for the Labour Party.

He was elected to the Norwegian Parliament from Troms county in 1950, and was re-elected on two occasions. He had previously served in the position of deputy representative during the term 1945–1949. He served most of this term as a regular representative, replacing Søren Berg Sørensen Moen who died in May 1946.

Leier Jacobsen was born in Trondenes and a member of the executive committee of the municipal council of Trondenes Municipality from 1922–1925. He then held the same position in Sandtorg Municipality, except the periods 1934–1937, 1937–1941, 1945–1947 and 1947–1951 when he served as mayor. He was also a member of Troms county council from 1934 to 1951.
