= Peter Karl Holmesland =

Norwegian politician

Peter Karl Holmesland (24 June 1866 – 1933) was a Norwegian jurist and politician for the Liberal Party.

Born in Holme Municipality as the son of former parliament member Simon Pedersen Holmesland, he enrolled as a student in 1884, graduated as cand.jur. in 1889 and started working as an attorney. In 1892 he was a clerk for Statistics Norway and the Ministry of Finance. He became acting stipendiary magistrate (byfoged) in the town of Larvik in 1899, and district stipendiary magistrate (sorenskriver) for Gjerpen in 1909. At that time, the Gjerpen district comprised Gjerpen, Porsgrund, Slemdal, Solum, and Holla. Holmesland stayed in this position until his death in 1933.

From 1901 to 1904 he had been a member of the municipal council of Larvik Municipality. He was elected to the Norwegian Parliament in 1913, representing the urban constituency of Porsgrund. He served only one three-year term.

He married Gunhild Løvrak, and their son Eilif Løvrak Holmesland became a jurist and politician too.
