= Johan Andersen (politician) =

Norwegian politician (1902–1968)

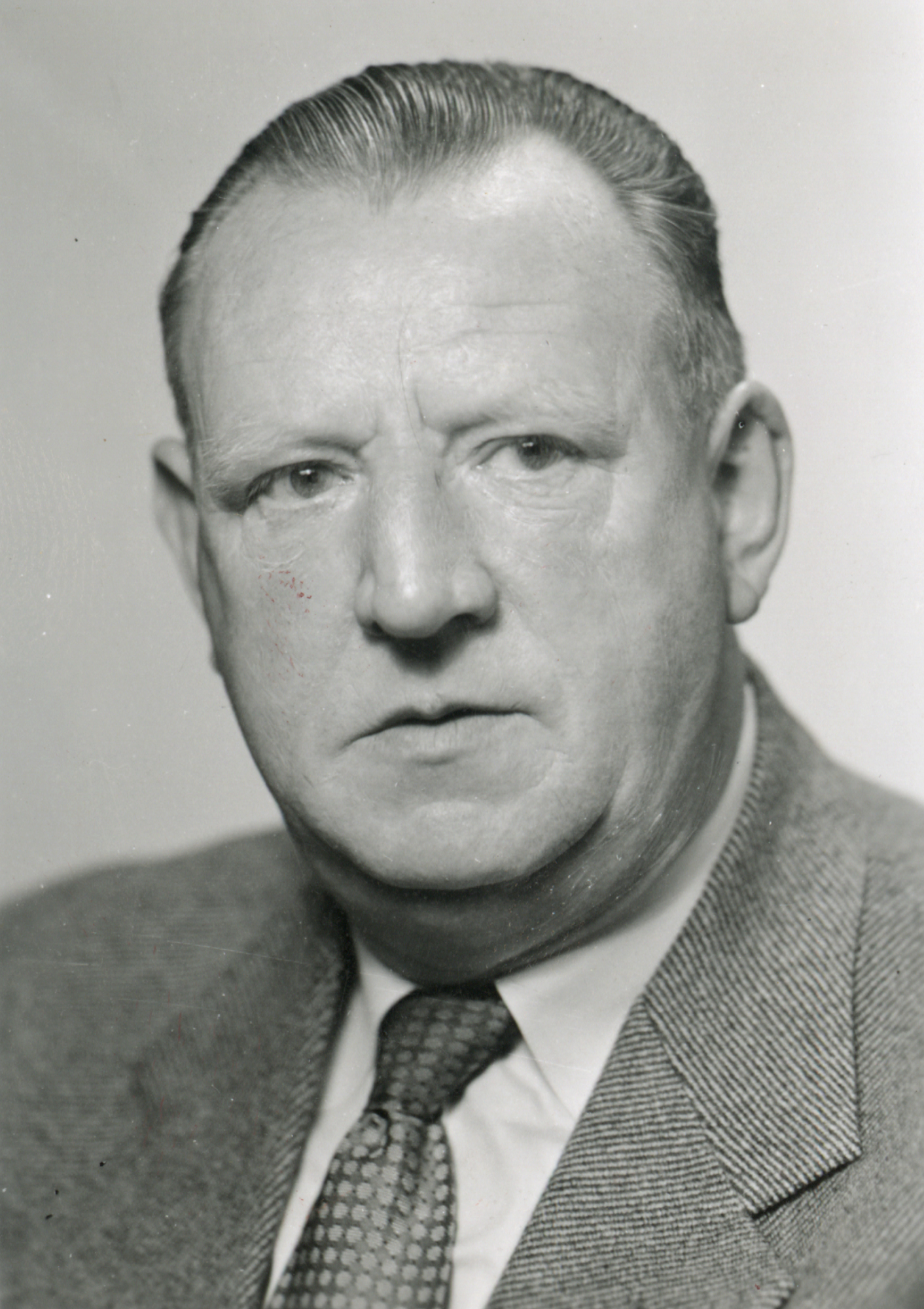
Image of Johan Andersen

Johan Andersen (5 May 1902 – 11 May 1968) was a Norwegian politician for the Labour Party.

He was born in Holmestrand.

He was elected to the Norwegian Parliament from the Market towns of Vestfold county in 1945, and was re-elected on five occasions. A year before the end of the last term, he died and was replaced by Willy Jansson.

On the local level he was a member of Horten city council from 1945 to 1947. He chaired the municipal party chapter from 1951 to 1966.
