= Joachim Dahl =

Norwegian politician

Joachim Dahl (28 June 1892 – 31 July 1972) was a Norwegian politician for the Labour Party.

He was elected to the Norwegian Parliament from Bergen in 1945, and was re-elected on one occasion.

Dahl was born in Bergen and a member of Bergen city council from 1934 to 1940 and 1945 to 1946.
