= Herman Smitt Ingebretsen =

Norwegian politician

Herman Smitt Ingebretsen (6 March 1891 – 13 November 1961) was a Norwegian politician for the Conservative Party. He was the Secretary-General of the Conservative Party 1936–1940.

He was born in Kristiansand.

During the occupation of Norway by Nazi Germany he was arrested in May 1943, and was incarcerated at Bredtveit concentration camp until 2 July 1943, then Grini concentration camp until the occupation's end.

He was elected to the Norwegian Parliament from Akershus in 1945, and was re-elected from Oslo on two occasions.

Smitt Ingebretsen was a member of the executive committee of Stavanger city council in the period 1934–1936.
