= Telemarksavisa =

Norwegian newspaper

- Type: Daily newspaper (six days a week)
- Owner: Amedia
- Editor: Ove Mellingen
- Founded: 1 October 1921
- Political alignment: Labour (1921–1994); Independent (1994–present)
- Headquarters: Skien, Norway
- Circulation: 22,886
- Website: www.ta.no

Telemarksavisa is a Norwegian newspaper, published in Skien in Telemark county.

Telemark Arbeiderblad was started on 1 October 1921 as a reaction to the perceived moderate stance of Skien's labour newspaper Bratsberg Demokraten. However, Telemark Arbeiderblad was not published out of Telemark, but out of Larvik, Vestfold. From 1 January 1922 it was published out of Drammen, Buskerud under the auspices of Fremtiden. It changed its name to Telemark Social-Demokrat in August 1922, went defunct in March 1923 but was revived in November 1923—this time in Notodden in Telemark. For a short time the Labour Party had no newspaper in Telemark, as Bratsberg Demokraten had been taken over by Communists in 1923. The name Telemark Social-Demokrat was given up for Telemark Arbeiderblad in November 1926, when it merged with another newspaper also named Telemark Social-Demokrat, owned by the Social Democratic Labour Party. It also moved from Notodden to Skien.

Its editor from 1928 to 1940 was Olav Vegheim. In 1940, when the occupation of Norway by Nazi Germany started, the newspaper was usurped by Nasjonal Samling and from September to October 1940 published as Telemark Blad. It was stopped on 30 November, and not revived until after the Second World War, on 11 May 1945.

It had a circulation of about 3,000 in 1932, which rose gradually until its heyday came in 1983 with a circulation of 27,750. It then declined to 25,447 in 1990. It retained its Labour Party connection until 1994, when it became independent, but still owned by A-pressen. It also changed its name to the less labour-inspired Telemarksavisa at the same time. Since 1996 it's had an online newspaper, and the paper edition is published from Monday to Saturday. In addition to Skien, it has offices in Notodden, Porsgrunn, Bamble, Bø i Telemark, and Kragerø. As of 2023, Telemarksavisa had a circulation of 22,858.

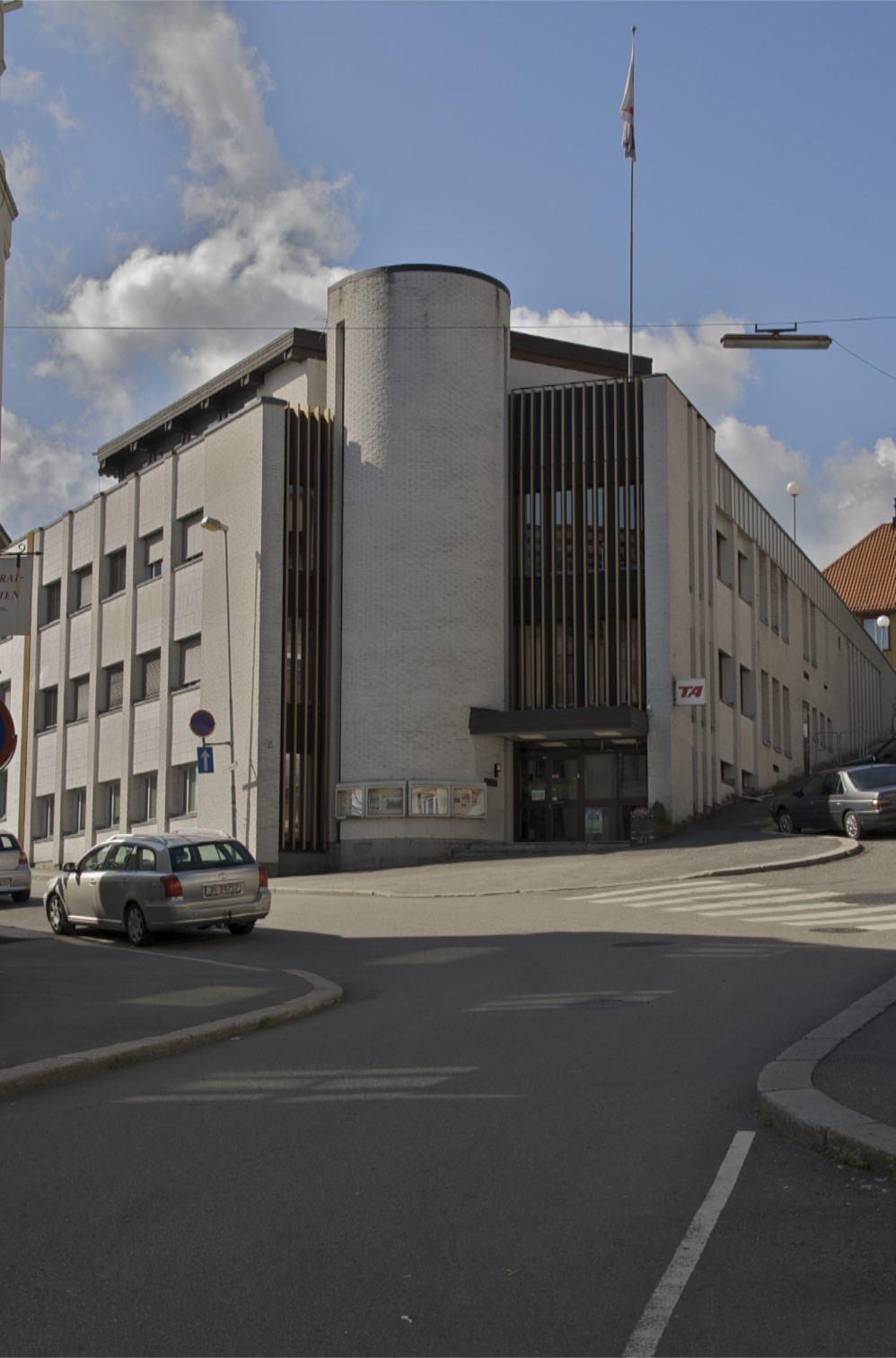
Main headquarters.
