= Jens Lunde =

Norwegian politician (1884–1974)

Jens Lunde (24 January 1884 – 13 November 1974) was a Norwegian politician for the Farmers' Party.

He was elected to the Norwegian Parliament from Sogn og Fjordane in 1945, and was re-elected on one occasion. He had previously served in the position of deputy representative during the terms 1931–1933, 1934–1936 and 1937–1945.

Lunde was born in Aurland and a member of the municipal council for Aurland Municipality between 1919 and 1941, serving as mayor in the periods 1925–1928, 1936–1937 and 1937–1941. After World War II he served briefly as a council member in 1945.
