= Ingvald Tøndel =

Norwegian politician (1887–1952)

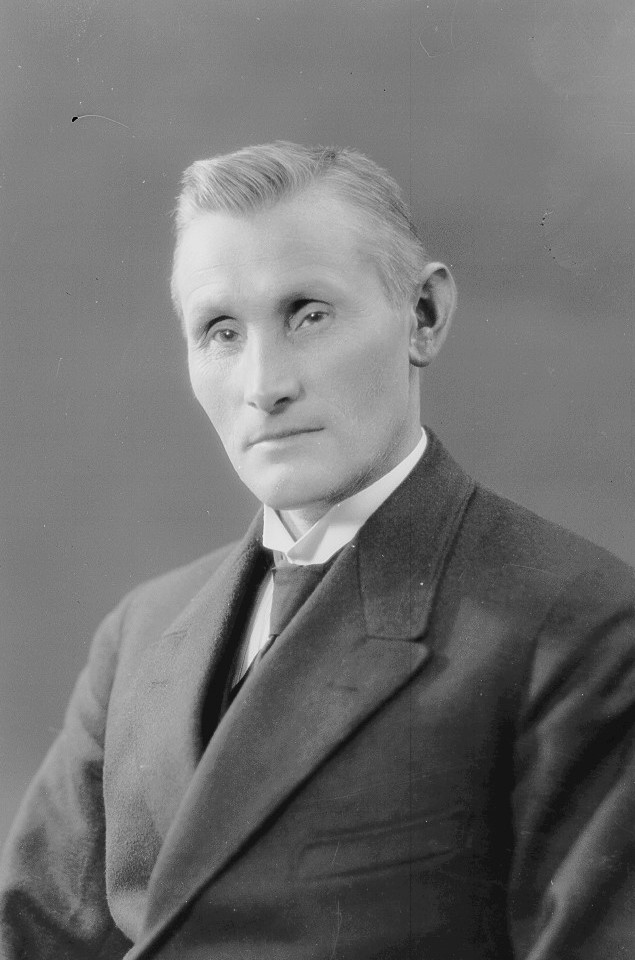
Tøndel in 1929

Ingvald Tøndel (7 January 1887 – 28 September 1952) was a Norwegian politician for the Christian Democratic Party.

Tøndel was born in Lensvik Municipality on the west coast of Norway.

Tøndel was elected to the Norwegian Parliament from Sør-Trøndelag in 1945, and was re-elected on one occasion. During his second term, he died and was replaced by Johannes Wigum.

Tøndel was a member of the municipal council of Hemne Municipality between 1922 and 1924, and then served as mayor from 1924 to 1934. After World War II, he returned as deputy mayor from 1947 to 1951. Between 1941 and 1949, he was a member of the Diocese Council of Nidaros.
