= Erling Amandus Johansen =

Norwegian politician

- Born: 7 August 1886; Christiania, Norway
- Died: 27 May 1961 (aged 74)
- Occupation: Politician

Erling Amandus Johansen (7 August 1886 – 27 May 1961) was a Norwegian politician.

He was born in Christiania to Edward Johansen and Gulda Amunda Nordseth. He was elected representative to the Storting for the periods 1931–1933 and 1934–1936, for the Conservative Party.
