= Håkon Martin Breivoll =

Norwegian politician (1886–1955)

Håkon Martin Breivoll (8 February 1886 – 5 May 1955) was a Norwegian politician for the Labour Party.

He was born in Ibestad Municipality.

He was elected to the Norwegian Parliament from Troms in 1945, and was re-elected on one occasion. He had previously served in the position of deputy representative during the terms 1934–1936 and 1937–1945.

Breivoll was mayor of Ibestad Municipality from 1922 to 1940, as well as for a brief period in 1945 after World War II. He was also a member of Troms county council, serving as chairman in 1936–1937, 1937–1940 and 1945.
