= Olav Kjetilson Nylund =

Norwegian politician

Olav Kjetilson Nylund (25 February 1903 – 1 November 1957) was a Norwegian politician for the Labour Party.

He was elected to the Norwegian Parliament from Aust-Agder in 1945, and was re-elected on one occasion.

Born in Åmli Municipality, he was a member of municipal council of Åmli Municipality from 1931 to 1957, serving as deputy mayor in 1947–1951 and mayor from 1934 to 1940. He was also a member of Aust-Agder county council from 1934 to 1946.

Outside politics he worked as a manual laborer, mainly in farming. He chaired the regional branch of the Norwegian Farmers and Smallholders Union from 1951 to 1957.
