= Olav Oksvik =

Norwegian politician

Olav Berntsen Olsvik
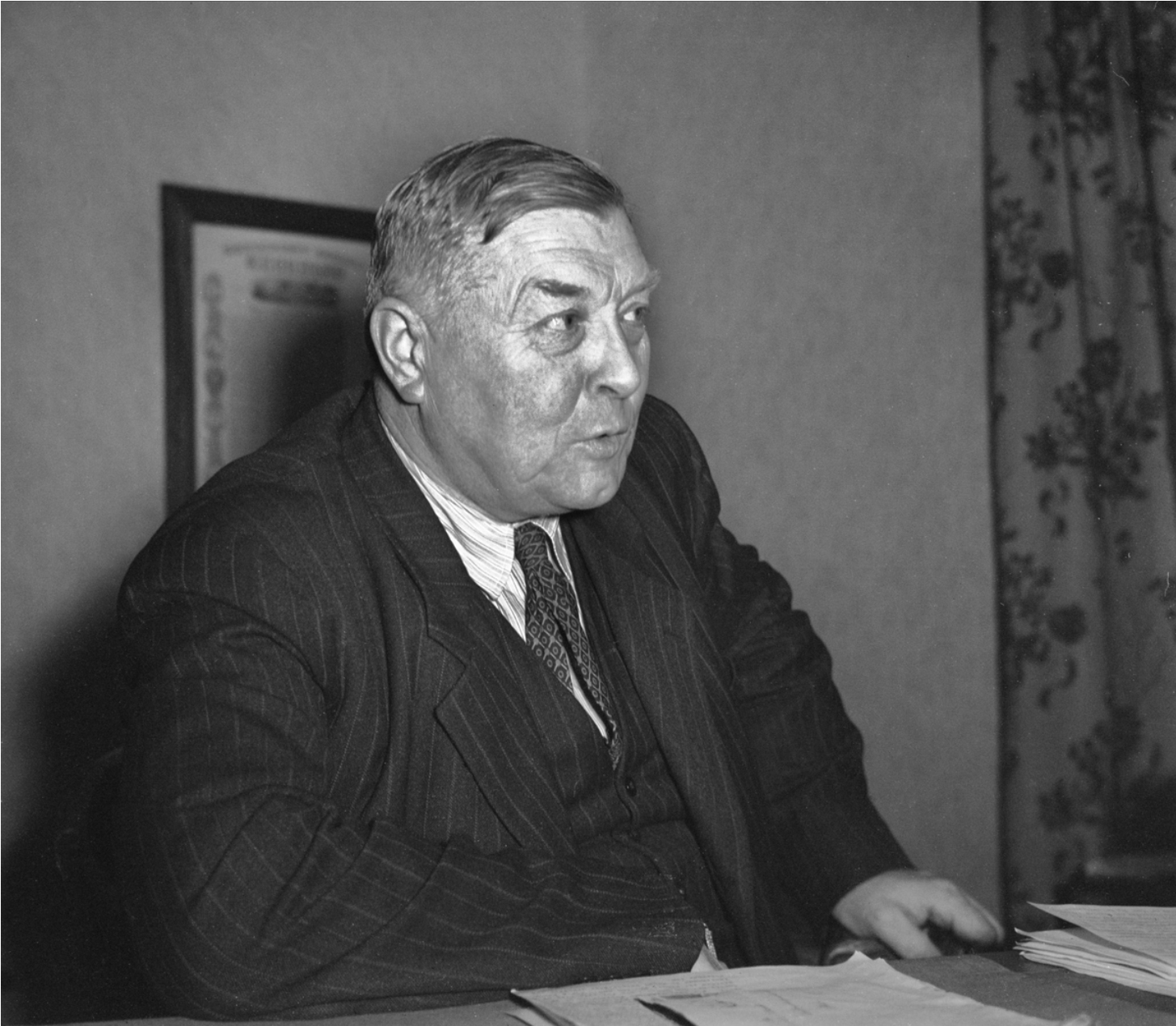

Governor of Møre og Romsdal
- In office 1952–1958
- Preceded by: Trygve Utheim
- Succeeded by: Erling Anger

Member of the Norwegian Parliament
- In office 1 January 1928 – 31 December 1953
- Constituency: Møre og Romsdal

Vice President of the Odelsting
- In office 10 December 1945 – 12 January 1953
- President: C. J. Hambro
- Succeeded by: Peder Leier Jacobsen

Minister of Agriculture and Food
- In office 6 December 1947 – 6 March 1948
- Prime Minister: Einar Gerhardsen
- Preceded by: Kristian Fjeld
- Succeeded by: Kristian Fjeld

Personal details
- Born: 7 May 1887 Stranda, Norway
- Died: 16 September 1958 (aged 71) Oslo, Norway
- Citizenship: Norway
- Parents: Bernt Olsen Oksvik (father); Ingeborg Fixdal (mother)
- Profession: Politician

Olav Berntsen Oksvik (7 May 1887 – 16 September 1958) was a Norwegian politician for the Labour and Social Democratic Labour parties. He served as a member of the Parliament of Norway from 1928 until 1952 and then as the County Governor of Møre og Romsdal county from 1952 until his death in 1958.

In 1928 he helped launch the newspaper Romsdal Folkeblad. In January 1941 he was ordered by Nasjonal Samling to become mayor of Bolsøy Municipality, which he categorically refused. He temporarily served as the acting Minister of Agriculture from 1947 to 1948 in place of Kristian Fjeld.

Government offices
Preceded by Trygve Utheim	County Governor of Møre og Romsdal; 1952–1958	Succeeded by Erling Anger
Preceded by Kristian Fjeld	Acting Minister of Agriculture; 6 Dec 1947–6 Mar 1948	Succeeded by Kristian Fjeld
