= Paul Tjøstolsen Sunde =

Norwegian politician

Paul Tjøstolsen Sunde (5 February 1896 – 2 September 1958) was a Norwegian politician for the Labour Party.

He was born in Nissedal Municipality. He was elected to the Norwegian Parliament from the Market towns of Telemark and Aust-Agder counties in 1945, and was re-elected on one occasion.

Sunde was a member of the municipal council of Arendal Municipality from 1931 to 1934, and of its executive committee in the periods 1937–1940 and 1955–1958.
