= Sverre Løberg =

Norwegian politician

Sverre Offenberg Løberg (4 April 1905 – 30 July 1976) was a Norwegian politician for the Labour Party.

He was elected to the Norwegian Parliament from the Market towns of Telemark and Aust-Agder counties in 1934, and was re-elected on five occasions.

Løberg was born in Skien and was deputy mayor of Skien city from 1925 to 1928, and later served as a member in the period 1934–1937.

== Selected works ==
- Det jeg husker best (1966)
