= Claudia Olsen =

Norwegian politician

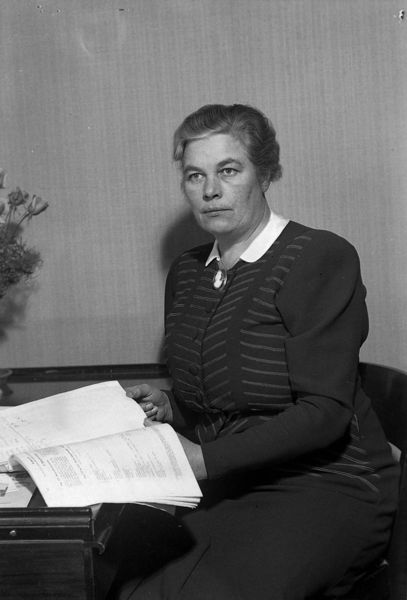
Claudia Olsen

Claudia Olsen (22 September 1896 – 9 November 1980) was a Norwegian politician for the Conservative Party.

She was born in Tønsberg.

She was elected to the Norwegian Parliament from the Market towns of Vestfold in 1945, and was re-elected on three occasions.

Olsen was a member of the executive committee of Tønsberg city council in the period 1928–1931, and was a regular city council member between 1933 and 1945.
