= List of members of the Storting, 2001–2005 =

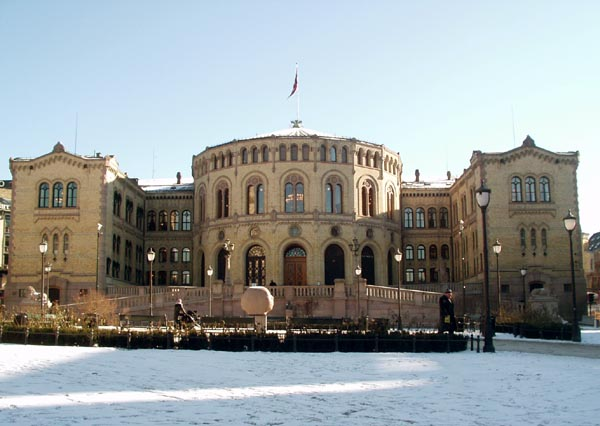
The parliament building.

List of all the members of the Storting in the period 2011 to 2005. The list includes all those initially elected to the Storting. The members (Norwegian: stortingsrepresentanter) were elected in the Norwegian parliamentary election of 10 September 2001.

The parliament convened on 22 October 2001, and the term ended on 30 September 2005.

== Voting system ==
Members to Stortinget are elected based on party-list proportional representation in plural member constituencies (Norwegian: forholdstallsvalg i flermannskretser). This means that representatives from different political parties, are elected from each constituency. The constituencies are identical to the 19 counties of Norway.

The electorate does not vote for individuals but rather for party lists, with a ranked list of candidates nominated by the party. This means that the person on top of the list will get the seat unless the voter alters the ballot. Parties may nominate candidates from outside their own constituency, and even Norwegian citizens currently living abroad.

The Sainte-Laguë method is used for allocating parliamentary seats to parties. As a result, the percentage of representatives is roughly equal to the nationwide percentage of votes. Still, a party with a high number of votes in only one constituency can win a seat there even if the nationwide percentage is low. In this election, this happened with the Coastal Party. Conversely, if a party's initial representation in Stortinget is proportionally less than it share of votes, the party may seat more representatives through leveling seats (Norwegian: utjevningsmandater), provided that the nationwide percentage is above the election threshold (Norwegian: sperregrense), currently at 4%. In 2001, eight seats were allocated via the leveling system.

== Overview ==
A total of 165 representatives were elected, distributed as follows:

- 23 to the Socialist Left Party (Sosialistisk Venstreparti)
- 43 to the Labour Party (Arbeiderpartiet)
- 10 to the Centre Party (Senterpartiet)
- 1 to the Coastal Party (Kystpartiet)
- 22 to the Christian Democratic Party (Kristelig Folkeparti)
- 2 to the Liberal Party (Venstre)
- 38 to the Conservative Party (Høyre)
- 26 to the Progress Party (Fremskrittspartiet)

Before the end of the term, the Progress Party group had been reduced to 24 as two representatives left the party, continuing as independents.

If a representative is absent for whatever reason, his or her seat will be filled by a candidate from the same party-list – in other words, there are no by-elections. Representatives who die during the term are replaced permanently, whereas representatives who are appointed to a government position, such as government minister (cabinet member) or state secretary, will be replaced by a deputy representative until the representative no longer holds the government position. Deputy representatives also meet during typically short-term absence, like when a representative travels abroad with a parliamentary work group or is absent for health reasons.

In October 2005, when the term ended, the percentage of female representatives was approximately 37.5%.

== List of representatives ==
The representatives elected as leveling seats are indicated with a blue background.

Name	Party	Constituency	Comments
Jan Olav Olsen	Conservative Party	Aust-Agder	
Åse Gunhild Woie Duesund	Christian Democrats	Aust-Agder	
Gunnar Halvorsen	Labour Party	Aust-Agder	
Torbjørn Andersen	Progress Party	Aust-Agder	
Jon Lilletun	Christian Democrats	Vest-Agder	
Ansgar Gabrielsen	Conservative Party	Vest-Agder	Appointed to the second cabinet Bondevik. Peter Skovholt Gitmark met in his place.
Rolf Terje Klungland	Labour Party	Vest-Agder	
Dagrun Eriksen	Christian Democrats	Vest-Agder	
Anne Berit Andersen	Conservative Party	Vest-Agder	
Jan Petersen	Conservative Party	Akershus	Appointed to the second cabinet Bondevik. André Oktay Dahl met in his place.
Vidar Bjørnstad	Labour Party	Akershus	
Sonja Irene Sjøli	Conservative Party	Akershus	
Ursula Evje	Progress Party	Akershus	Left her party and sat as an independent representative from December 2004.
Rolf Reikvam	Socialist Left Party	Akershus	
Grethe Fossli	Labour Party	Akershus	
Jan Tore Sanner	Conservative Party	Akershus	
Valgerd Svarstad Haugland	Christian Democrats	Akershus	Appointed to the second cabinet Bondevik. Einar Holstad met in her place.
André Kvakkestad	Progress Party	Akershus	
Kjell Engebretsen	Labour Party	Akershus	
Leif Frode Onarheim	Conservative Party	Akershus	
Siri Hall Arnøy	Socialist Left Party	Akershus	
Morten Høglund	Progress Party	Akershus	
Åslaug Haga	Centre Party	Akershus	
Julie Christiansen	Conservative Party	Akershus	
Thorbjørn Jagland	Labour Party	Buskerud	
Trond Helleland	Conservative Party	Buskerud	
Ulf Erik Knudsen	Progress Party	Buskerud	
Sigrun Eng	Labour Party	Buskerud	
Magnar Lund Bergo	Socialist Left Party	Buskerud	
Beate Heieren Hundhammer	Conservative Party	Buskerud	
Finn Kristian Marthinsen	Christian Democrats	Buskerud	
Karl Eirik Schjøtt-Pedersen	Labour Party	Finnmark	
Olav Gunnar Ballo	Socialist Left Party	Finnmark	
Raymond Robertsen	Conservative Party	Finnmark	
Eva M. Nielsen	Labour Party	Finnmark	
Sylvia Brustad	Labour Party	Hedmark	
Eirin Faldet	Labour Party	Hedmark	
Karin Andersen	Socialist Left Party	Hedmark	
Bjørn Hernæs	Conservative Party		
Per Roar Bredvold	Progress Party	Hedmark	
Knut Storberget	Labour Party	Hedmark	
Ola D. Gløtvold	Centre Party	Hedmark	
Åse Wisløff Nilssen	Christian Democrats	Hedmark	
Oddvard Nilsen	Conservative Party	Hordaland	
Ranveig Frøiland	Labour Party	Hordaland	
Arne Sortevik	Progress Party	Hordaland	
Ingebrigt S. Sørfonn	Christian Democrats	Hordaland	
Ågot Valle	Socialist Left Party	Hordaland	
Erna Solberg	Conservative Party	Hordaland	Appointed to the second cabinet Bondevik. Silja Ekeland Bjørkly met in her place.
Olav Akselsen	Labour Party	Hordaland	
Gjermund Hagesæter	Progress Party	Hordaland	
Anita Apelthun Sæle	Christian Democrats	Hordaland	
Øyvind Halleraker	Conservative Party	Hordaland	
Leif Lund	Labour Party	Hordaland	Died in May 2004. Rita Tveiten met in his place.
Audun Lysbakken	Socialist Left Party	Hordaland	
Lars Sponheim	Liberal Party	Hordaland	Appointed to the second cabinet Bondevik. May Britt Vihovde met in his place.
Karin S. Woldseth	Progress Party	Hordaland	
Ingmar Ljones	Christian Democrats	Hordaland	
Rune J. Skjælaaen	Centre Party	Hordaland	
Torbjørn Hansen	Conservative Party	Hordaland	
Kjell Magne Bondevik	Christian Democrats	Møre og Romsdal	Prime Minister in the second cabinet Bondevik. Modulf Aukan met in his place.
Asmund Kristoffersen	Labour Party	Møre og Romsdal	
Petter Løvik	Conservative Party	Møre og Romsdal	
Lodve Solholm	Progress Party	Møre og Romsdal	
May-Helen Molvær Grimstad	Christian Democrats	Møre og Romsdal	
Karita Bekkemellem Orheim	Labour Party	Møre og Romsdal	
Bjørn Jacobsen	Socialist Left Party	Møre og Romsdal	
Elisabeth Røbekk Nørve	Conservative Party	Møre og Romsdal	
Harald T. Nesvik	Progress Party	Møre og Romsdal	
Eli Sollied Øveraas	Centre Party	Møre og Romsdal	
Hill-Marta Solberg	Labour Party	Nordland	
Geir-Ketil Hansen	Socialist Left Party	Nordland	
Kenneth Svendsen	Progress Party	Nordland	
Ivar Kristiansen	Conservative Party	Nordland	
Torny Pedersen	Labour Party	Nordland	
Jan Sahl	Christian Democrats	Nordland	
Steinar Bastesen	Coastal Party	Nordland	
Odd Roger Enoksen	Centre Party	Nordland	
Tor-Arne Strøm	Labour Party	Nordland	
Åsa Elvik	Socialist Left Party	Nordland	
Jan Arild Ellingsen	Progress Party	Nordland	
Søren Fredrik Voie	Conservative Party	Nordland	
Haakon Blankenborg	Labour Party	Oppland	
Berit Brørby	Labour Party	Oppland	
Olemic Thommessen	Conservative Party	Oppland	
Inger S. Enger	Centre Party	Oppland	
Kjetil Bjørklund	Socialist Left Party	Oppland	
Thore A. Nistad	Progress Party	Oppland	
Torstein Rudihagen	Labour Party	Oppland	
Per-Kristian Foss	Conservative Party	Oslo	Appointed to the second cabinet Bondevik. Ine Marie Eriksen met in his place.
Jens Stoltenberg	Labour Party	Oslo	
Kristin Halvorsen	Socialist Left Party	Oslo	
Kristin Krohn Devold	Conservative Party	Oslo	Appointed to the second cabinet Bondevik. Hans Gjeisar Kjæstad met in her place.
Carl I. Hagen	Progress Party	Oslo	
Marit Nybakk	Labour Party	Oslo	
Inge Lønning	Conservative Party	Oslo	
Heikki Holmås	Socialist Left Party	Oslo	
Bjørgulv Froyn	Labour Party	Oslo	
Lars Rise	Christian Democrats	Oslo	
Siv Jensen	Progress Party	Oslo	
Odd Einar Dørum	Liberal Party	Oslo	Appointed to the second cabinet Bondevik. Trine Skei Grande met in his place.
Heidi Larssen	Conservative Party	Oslo	
Heidi Sørensen	Socialist Left Party	Oslo	
Afshan Rafiq	Conservative Party	Oslo	
Britt Hildeng	Labour Party	Oslo	
Bent Høie	Conservative Party	Rogaland	
Einar Steensnæs	Christian Democrats	Rogaland	
Jan Simonsen	Progress Party	Rogaland	Left his party and sat as an independent representative from October 2001.
Tore Nordtun	Labour Party	Rogaland	
Finn Martin Vallersnes	Conservative Party	Rogaland	
Bjørg Tørresdal	Christian Democrats	Rogaland	
Hallgeir H. Langeland	Socialist Left Party	Rogaland	
Øyvind Vaksdal	Progress Party	Rogaland	
Oddbjørg Ausdal Starrfelt	Labour Party	Rogaland	
Siri A. Meling	Conservative Party	Rogaland	
Magnhild Meltveit Kleppa	Centre Party	Rogaland	
Reidar Sandal	Labour Party	Sogn og Fjordane	
Jorunn Ringstad	Centre Party	Sogn og Fjordane	
Magne Aarøen	Christian Democrats	Sogn og Fjordane	Died in June 2003. Per Steinar Osmundnes met in his place.
Sverre J. Hoddevik	Conservative Party	Sogn og Fjordane	
Heidi Grande Røys	Socialist Left Party	Sogn og Fjordane	
Sigvald Oppebøen Hansen	Labour Party	Telemark	
John I. Alvheim	Progress Party	Telemark	
Kari Lise Holmberg	Conservative Party	Telemark	
Sigbjørn Molvik	Socialist Left Party	Telemark	
Gunn Olsen	Labour Party	Telemark	
Bror Yngve Rahm	Christian Democrats	Telemark	
Bendiks H. Arnesen	Labour Party	Troms	
Åge Konradsen	Conservative Party	Troms	
Lena Jensen	Socialist Left Party	Troms	
Øyvind Korsberg	Progress Party	Troms	
Ivar Østberg	Christian Democrats	Troms	
Synnøve Konglevoll	Labour Party	Troms	
Bjarne Håkon Hanssen	Labour Party	Nord-Trøndelag	
Marit Arnstad	Centre Party	Nord-Trøndelag	
Aud Gaundal	Labour Party	Nord-Trøndelag	
Inge Ryan	Socialist Left Party	Nord-Trøndelag	
Per Sandberg	Progress Party	Nord-Trøndelag	
Arne Lyngstad	Christian Democrats	Nord-Trøndelag	
Gunhild Øyangen	Labour Party	Sør-Trøndelag	
Børge Brende	Conservative Party	Sør-Trøndelag	Appointed to the second cabinet Bondevik. Linda Cathrine Hofstad met in his place.
Øystein Djupedal	Socialist Left Party	Sør-Trøndelag	
Trond Giske	Labour Party	Sør-Trøndelag	
Christopher Stensaker	Progress Party	Sør-Trøndelag	
Ola T. Lånke	Christian Democrats	Sør-Trøndelag	
Michael Momyr	Conservative Party	Sør-Trøndelag	
Gunn Karin Gjul	Labour Party	Sør-Trøndelag	
Ingvild Vaggen Malvik	Socialist Left Party	Sør-Trøndelag	
Morten Lund	Centre Party	Sør-Trøndelag	
Svein Flåtten	Conservative Party	Vestfold	
Jørgen Kosmo	Labour Party	Vestfold	
Per Ove Width	Progress Party	Vestfold	
Hans Kristian Hogsnes	Conservative Party	Vestfold	
Inga Marte Thorkildsen	Socialist Left Party	Vestfold	
Elsa Skarbøvik	Christian Democrats	Vestfold	
Anne Helen Rui	Labour Party	Vestfold	
Per Erik Monsen	Progress Party	Vestfold	
Signe Øye	Labour Party	Østfold	
Martin Engeset	Conservative Party	Østfold	
Øystein Hedstrøm	Progress Party	Østfold	
Svein Roald Hansen	Labour Party	Østfold	
Odd Holten	Christian Democrats	Østfold	
May Hansen	Socialist Left Party	Østfold	
Ingjerd Schou	Conservative Party	Østfold	Appointed to the second cabinet Bondevik until June 2004, during which period Carsten Dybevig met in her place.
Henrik Rød	Progress Party	Østfold	
