= Versto =

Versto is a surname. Notable people with the surname include:

- Aslak Versto (1924–1992), Norwegian politician
- Astrid Versto (born 1953), Norwegian journalist and diplomat
- Olav Versto (1950–2011), Norwegian journalist and editor
- Olav Aslakson Versto (1892–1977), Norwegian politician
- Stein Versto (born 1957), Norwegian poet, novelist, translator and folk musician
