= Telemark (Storting constituency) =

Constituency of the Storting, the national legislature of Norway

- Constituency for the Storting
- Location of Telemark within Norway
- County: Telemark
- Population: 177,769 (2025)
- Electorate: 133,948 (2025)
- Area: 15,298 km^{2} (2025)

Current constituency
- Created: 1921
- Seats: List: 5 (2005–present); 6 (1953–2005); 5 (1921–1953)
- Members of the Storting: List: Konstanse Marie Alvær (Ap); Hans Edvard Askjer (KrF); Jone Blikra (Ap); Mahmoud Farahmand (H); Line Marlene Haugen (FrP); Bård Hoksrud (FrP)
- Created from: List: Bamle; East Telemark; Gjerpen; West Telemark

Telemark is one of the 19 multi-member constituencies of the Storting, the national legislature of Norway. The constituency was established in 1921 following the introduction of proportional representation for elections to the Storting. It is conterminous with the county of Telemark. The constituency currently elects five of the 169 members of the Storting using the open party-list proportional representation electoral system. At the 2025 parliamentary election it had 133,948 registered electors.

== Electoral system ==
Telemark currently elects five of the 169 members of the Storting using the open (Note: Although technically elections to the Storting have open lists, they are in effect closed lists as a majority of those voting for a party must make changes to the lists for the changes to take effect, which has never happened since the introduction of proportional representation in 1921, and as result candidates are elected in the order submitted by the party.) party-list proportional representation electoral system. Constituency seats are allocated by the County Electoral Committee using the Modified Sainte-Laguë method. Compensatory seats (seats at large or levelling seats) are calculated based on the national vote and are allocated by the National Electoral Committee using the Modified Sainte-Laguë method at the constituency level (one for each constituency). Only parties that reach the 4% national threshold compete for compensatory seats.

== Election results ==
=== Summary ===
Election	Communists K			Reds R / RV / FMS			Socialist Left SV / SF			Labour Ap			Greens MDG			Centre Sp / Bp / L			Liberals V			Christian Democrats KrF			Conservatives H			Progress FrP / ALP		
Election	Votes	%	Seats	Votes	%	Seats	Votes	%	Seats	Votes	%	Seats	Votes	%	Seats	Votes	%	Seats	Votes	%	Seats	Votes	%	Seats	Votes	%	Seats	Votes	%	Seats
2025				6,044	5.85%	0	4,242	4.11%	0	32,363	31.34%	2	3,439	3.33%	0	6,378	6.18%	0	2,134	2.07%	0	5,180	5.02%	0	11,406	11.04%	1	26,919	26.07%	2
2021				4,506	4.65%	0	5,934	6.12%	0	29,883	30.84%	2	2,729	2.82%	0	15,963	16.47%	1	2,203	2.27%	0	4,327	4.46%	0	15,198	15.68%	1	12,297	12.69%	1
2017				2,041	2.11%	0	4,800	4.96%	0	30,931	31.93%	2	2,392	2.47%	0	12,457	12.86%	1	2,591	2.67%	0	4,825	4.98%	0	19,445	20.07%	1	16,013	16.53%	1
2013				884	0.90%	0	3,192	3.26%	0	35,963	36.74%	3	2,116	2.16%	0	4,360	4.45%	0	3,393	3.47%	0	6,610	6.75%	0	21,300	21.76%	1	18,564	18.97%	1
2009				1,147	1.22%	0	5,020	5.32%	0	39,296	41.66%	3	240	0.25%	0	5,184	5.50%	0	2,374	2.52%	0	6,239	6.61%	0	12,405	13.15%	1	21,708	23.01%	1
2005				758	0.80%	0	8,601	9.05%	0	37,356	39.33%	3				6,490	6.83%	0	3,494	3.68%	0	7,414	7.80%	0	8,886	9.35%	0	21,022	22.13%	2
2001	44	0.05%	0	675	0.73%	0	13,335	14.47%	1	27,039	29.35%	2				4,476	4.86%	0	2,598	2.82%	0	12,116	13.15%	1	13,449	14.60%	1	16,305	17.70%	1
1997	65	0.07%	0	1,021	1.05%	0	7,342	7.53%	0	38,002	38.97%	3	151	0.15%	0	7,772	7.97%	0	3,413	3.50%	0	13,841	14.19%	1	9,551	9.79%	1	14,911	15.29%	1
1993				575	0.61%	0	9,377	9.98%	0	36,374	38.73%	3				15,157	16.14%	1	2,564	2.73%	0	9,499	10.11%	1	9,918	10.56%	1	8,453	9.00%	0
1989				589	0.57%	0	14,371	13.94%	1	37,980	36.85%	2	331	0.32%	0	5,266	5.11%	0	2,590	2.51%	0	10,750	10.43%	1	17,584	17.06%	1	13,001	12.61%	1
1985	162	0.16%	0	405	0.39%	0	5,641	5.46%	0	52,213	50.56%	3				4,340	4.20%	0	2,617	2.53%	0	9,457	9.16%	1	25,687	24.87%	2	2,131	2.06%	0
1981	280	0.28%	0	491	0.49%	0	6,028	6.05%	0	45,965	46.17%	3				10,187	10.23%	0				10,736	10.78%	1	22,902	23.00%	2	2,440	2.45%	0
1977	298	0.32%	0	391	0.42%	0	4,805	5.13%	0	46,693	49.89%	4				7,951	8.50%	0	5,196	5.55%	0	12,470	13.32%	1	14,481	15.47%	1	1,159	1.24%	0
1973				284	0.33%	0	14,715	16.85%	1	32,536	37.26%	2							11,913	13.64%	1	12,577	14.40%	1	9,965	11.41%	1	2,909	3.33%	0
1969	1,012	1.13%	0				4,664	5.20%	0	47,002	52.41%	3							11,983	13.36%	1	13,953	15.56%	1	11,059	12.33%	1			
1965	1,049	1.19%	0				7,962	9.04%	0	42,952	48.76%	3							11,299	12.83%	1	13,453	15.27%	1	11,369	12.91%	1			
1961	2,520	3.17%	0				4,513	5.67%	0	40,567	50.96%	3				5,249	6.59%	0	9,392	11.80%	1	8,273	10.39%	1	9,098	11.43%	1			
1957	2,652	3.39%	0							43,552	55.73%	4							9,388	12.01%	1	8,331	10.66%	0	13,586	17.38%	0			
1953	4,319	5.60%	0							40,350	52.33%	4				5,513	7.15%	0	10,634	13.79%	1	8,742	11.34%	1	7,552	9.79%	0			
1949	3,630	6.71%	0							26,479	48.91%	3							11,030	20.37%	1	5,542	10.24%	0	7,291	13.47%	1			
1945	6,012	12.53%	0							21,179	44.15%	3				2,837	5.91%	0	8,508	17.74%	1	6,668	13.90%	1	2,764	5.76%	0			
1936										20,750	46.46%	3				4,586	10.27%	1	12,940	28.97%	1				4,410	9.87%	0			
1933	400	1.05%	0							16,862	44.36%	3				4,598	12.10%	1	9,111	23.97%	1				3,613	9.51%	0			
1930	252	0.67%	0							13,037	34.89%	2				6,064	16.23%	1	13,354	35.74%	2				3,795	10.16%	0			
1927	1,006	3.48%	0							12,044	41.72%	2				4,757	16.48%	1	8,161	28.27%	2				2,902	10.05%	0			
1924	1,866	6.33%	0							6,413	21.74%	1				4,635	15.71%	1	8,026	27.21%	2				5,311	18.00%	1			
1921										6,828	25.40%	2				3,258	12.12%	0	9,396	34.95%	2				5,369	19.97%	1			

(Excludes compensatory seats. Figures in italics represent joint lists.)

=== Detailed ===
==== 2020s ====
===== 2025 =====
Results of the 2025 parliamentary election held on 8 September 2025:

Party		Votes	%	Seats		
Party		Votes	%	Con.	Com.	Tot.
Labour Party	Ap	32,363	31.34%	2	0	2
Progress Party	FrP	26,919	26.07%	2	0	2
Conservative Party	H	11,406	11.04%	1	0	1
Centre Party	Sp	6,378	6.18%	0	0	0
Red Party	R	6,044	5.85%	0	0	0
Christian Democratic Party	KrF	5,180	5.02%	0	1	1
Socialist Left Party	SV	4,242	4.11%	0	0	0
Green Party	MDG	3,439	3.33%	0	0	0
Liberal Party	V	2,134	2.07%	0	0	0
Norway Democrats	ND	1,112	1.08%	0	0	0
Industry and Business Party	INP	862	0.83%	0	0	0
Generation Party	GP	767	0.74%	0	0	0
Conservative	K	717	0.69%	0	0	0
Pensioners' Party	PP	630	0.61%	0	0	0
DNI Party	DNI	447	0.43%	0	0	0
Peace and Justice	FOR	290	0.28%	0	0	0
Welfare and Innovation Party	VIP	200	0.19%	0	0	0
Center Party	PS	142	0.14%	0	0	0
Valid votes		103,272	100.00%	5	1	6
Blank votes		942	0.90%			
Rejected votes – other		256	0.25%			
Total polled		104,470	77.99%			
Registered electors		133,948				

The following candidates were elected:

- Constituency seats - Terje Aasland (Ap); Mahmoud Farahmand (H); Line Marlene Haugen (FrP); Bård Hoksrud (FrP); and Lene Vågslid (Ap).
- Compensatory seat - Hans Edvard Askjer (KrF).

===== 2021 =====
Results of the 2021 parliamentary election held on 13 September 2021:

Party		Votes	%	Seats		
Party		Votes	%	Con.	Com.	Tot.
Labour Party	Ap	29,883	30.84%	2	0	2
Centre Party	Sp	15,963	16.47%	1	0	1
Conservative Party	H	15,198	15.68%	1	0	1
Progress Party	FrP	12,297	12.69%	1	0	1
Socialist Left Party	SV	5,934	6.12%	0	0	0
Red Party	R	4,506	4.65%	0	1	1
Christian Democratic Party	KrF	4,327	4.46%	0	0	0
Green Party	MDG	2,729	2.82%	0	0	0
Liberal Party	V	2,203	2.27%	0	0	0
Democrats in Norway		1,379	1.42%	0	0	0
The Christians	PDK	631	0.65%	0	0	0
Industry and Business Party	INP	596	0.62%	0	0	0
Pensioners' Party	PP	419	0.43%	0	0	0
Center Party		263	0.27%	0	0	0
Health Party		193	0.20%	0	0	0
Capitalist Party		110	0.11%	0	0	0
Alliance - Alternative for Norway		107	0.11%	0	0	0
People's Action No to More Road Tolls	FNB	87	0.09%	0	0	0
Pirate Party of Norway		85	0.09%	0	0	0
Valid votes		96,910	100.00%	5	1	6
Blank votes		638	0.65%			
Rejected votes – other		76	0.08%			
Total polled		97,624	74.55%			
Registered electors		130,953				

The following candidates were elected:

- Constituency seats - Terje Aasland (Ap); Mahmoud Farahmand (H); Bård Hoksrud (FrP); Åslaug Sem-Jacobsen (Sp); and Lene Vågslid (Ap).
- Compensatory seat - Tobias Drevland Lund (R).

==== 2010s ====
===== 2017 =====
Results of the 2017 parliamentary election held on 11 September 2017:

Party		Votes	%	Seats		
Party		Votes	%	Con.	Com.	Tot.
Labour Party	Ap	30,931	31.93%	2	0	2
Conservative Party	H	19,445	20.07%	1	0	1
Progress Party	FrP	16,013	16.53%	1	0	1
Centre Party	Sp	12,457	12.86%	1	0	1
Christian Democratic Party	KrF	4,825	4.98%	0	1	1
Socialist Left Party	SV	4,800	4.96%	0	0	0
Liberal Party	V	2,591	2.67%	0	0	0
Green Party	MDG	2,392	2.47%	0	0	0
Red Party	R	2,041	2.11%	0	0	0
The Christians	PDK	537	0.55%	0	0	0
Health Party		354	0.37%	0	0	0
The Alliance		138	0.14%	0	0	0
Capitalist Party		133	0.14%	0	0	0
Democrats in Norway		129	0.13%	0	0	0
Coastal Party	KP	81	0.08%	0	0	0
Valid votes		96,867	100.00%	5	1	6
Blank votes		625	0.64%			
Rejected votes – other		240	0.25%			
Total polled		97,732	75.35%			
Registered electors		129,712				

The following candidates were elected:

- Constituency seats - Terje Aasland (Ap); Solveig Sundbø Abrahamsen (H); Bård Hoksrud (FrP); Åslaug Sem-Jacobsen (Sp); and Lene Vågslid (Ap).
- Compensatory seat - Geir Jørgen Bekkevold (KrF).

===== 2013 =====
Results of the 2013 parliamentary election held on 8 and 9 September 2013:

Party		Votes	%	Seats		
Party		Votes	%	Con.	Com.	Tot.
Labour Party	Ap	35,963	36.74%	3	0	3
Conservative Party	H	21,300	21.76%	1	0	1
Progress Party	FrP	18,564	18.97%	1	0	1
Christian Democratic Party	KrF	6,610	6.75%	0	1	1
Centre Party	Sp	4,360	4.45%	0	0	0
Liberal Party	V	3,393	3.47%	0	0	0
Socialist Left Party	SV	3,192	3.26%	0	0	0
Green Party	MDG	2,116	2.16%	0	0	0
The Christians	PDK	1,017	1.04%	0	0	0
Red Party	R	884	0.90%	0	0	0
Pirate Party of Norway		239	0.24%	0	0	0
Christian Unity Party	KSP	116	0.12%	0	0	0
Coastal Party	KP	68	0.07%	0	0	0
Democrats in Norway		56	0.06%	0	0	0
Valid votes		97,878	100.00%	5	1	6
Blank votes		455	0.46%			
Rejected votes – other		112	0.11%			
Total polled		98,445	76.70%			
Registered electors		128,352				

The following candidates were elected:

- Constituency seats - Terje Aasland (Ap); Christian Tynning Bjørnø (Ap); Bård Hoksrud (FrP); Torbjørn Røe Isaksen (H); and Lene Vågslid (Ap).
- Compensatory seat - Geir Jørgen Bekkevold (KrF).

==== 2000s ====
===== 2009 =====
Results of the 2009 parliamentary election held on 13 and 14 September 2009:

Party		Votes	%	Seats		
Party		Votes	%	Con.	Com.	Tot.
Labour Party	Ap	39,296	41.66%	3	0	3
Progress Party	FrP	21,708	23.01%	1	0	1
Conservative Party	H	12,405	13.15%	1	0	1
Christian Democratic Party	KrF	6,239	6.61%	0	1	1
Centre Party	Sp	5,184	5.50%	0	0	0
Socialist Left Party	SV	5,020	5.32%	0	0	0
Liberal Party	V	2,374	2.52%	0	0	0
Red Party	R	1,147	1.22%	0	0	0
Pensioners' Party	PP	348	0.37%	0	0	0
Christian Unity Party	KSP	244	0.26%	0	0	0
Green Party	MDG	240	0.25%	0	0	0
Democrats in Norway		68	0.07%	0	0	0
Coastal Party	KP	60	0.06%	0	0	0
Valid votes		94,333	100.00%	5	1	6
Blank votes		382	0.40%			
Rejected votes – other		39	0.04%			
Total polled		94,754	74.63%			
Registered electors		126,972				

The following candidates were elected:

- Constituency seats - Terje Aasland (Ap); Sigvald Oppebøen Hansen (Ap); Bård Hoksrud (FrP); Torbjørn Røe Isaksen (H); and Gunn Olsen (Ap).
- Compensatory seat - Geir Jørgen Bekkevold (KrF).

===== 2005 =====
Results of the 2005 parliamentary election held on 11 and 12 September 2005:

Party		Votes	%	Seats		
Party		Votes	%	Con.	Com.	Tot.
Labour Party	Ap	37,356	39.33%	3	0	3
Progress Party	FrP	21,022	22.13%	2	0	2
Conservative Party	H	8,886	9.35%	0	1	1
Socialist Left Party	SV	8,601	9.05%	0	0	0
Christian Democratic Party	KrF	7,414	7.80%	0	0	0
Centre Party	Sp	6,490	6.83%	0	0	0
Liberal Party	V	3,494	3.68%	0	0	0
Red Electoral Alliance	RV	758	0.80%	0	0	0
Pensioners' Party	PP	322	0.34%	0	0	0
Coastal Party	KP	276	0.29%	0	0	0
Christian Unity Party	KSP	238	0.25%	0	0	0
Democrats		134	0.14%	0	0	0
Valid votes		94,991	100.00%	5	1	6
Blank votes		383	0.40%			
Rejected votes – other		103	0.11%			
Total polled		95,477	75.90%			
Registered electors		125,793				

The following candidates were elected:

- Constituency seats - Terje Aasland (Ap); Kåre Fostervold (FrP); Sigvald Oppebøen Hansen (Ap); Bård Hoksrud (FrP); and Gunn Olsen (Ap).
- Compensatory seat - Kari Lise Holmberg (H).

===== 2001 =====
Results of the 2001 parliamentary election held on 9 and 10 September 2001:

Party		Votes	%	Seats		
Party		Votes	%	Con.	Com.	Tot.
Labour Party	Ap	27,039	29.35%	2	0	2
Progress Party	FrP	16,305	17.70%	1	0	1
Conservative Party	H	13,449	14.60%	1	0	1
Socialist Left Party	SV	13,335	14.47%	1	0	1
Christian Democratic Party	KrF	12,116	13.15%	1	0	1
Centre Party	Sp	4,476	4.86%	0	0	0
Liberal Party	V	2,598	2.82%	0	0	0
The Political Party	DPP	706	0.77%	0	0	0
Red Electoral Alliance	RV	675	0.73%	0	0	0
Coastal Party	KP	515	0.56%	0	0	0
Pensioners' Party	PP	349	0.38%	0	0	0
Christian Unity Party	KSP	265	0.29%	0	0	0
Fatherland Party	FLP	103	0.11%	0	0	0
Norwegian People's Party	NFP	89	0.10%	0	0	0
Social Democrats		73	0.08%	0	0	0
Communist Party of Norway	K	44	0.05%	0	0	0
Valid votes		92,137	100.00%	6	0	6
Rejected votes		489	0.53%			
Total polled		92,626	73.64%			
Registered electors		125,774				

The following candidates were elected:

- Constituency seats - John Alvheim (FrP); Sigvald Oppebøen Hansen (Ap); Kari Lise Holmberg (H); Sigbjørn Molvik (SV); Gunn Olsen (Ap); and Bror Yngve Rahm (KrF).

==== 1990s ====
===== 1997 =====
Results of the 1997 parliamentary election held on 15 September 1997:

Party		Votes	%	Seats		
Party		Votes	%	Con.	Com.	Tot.
Labour Party	Ap	38,002	38.97%	3	0	3
Progress Party	FrP	14,911	15.29%	1	0	1
Christian Democratic Party	KrF	13,841	14.19%	1	0	1
Conservative Party	H	9,551	9.79%	1	0	1
Centre Party	Sp	7,772	7.97%	0	0	0
Socialist Left Party	SV	7,342	7.53%	0	0	0
Liberal Party	V	3,413	3.50%	0	0	0
Pensioners' Party	PP	1,215	1.25%	0	0	0
Red Electoral Alliance	RV	1,021	1.05%	0	0	0
Fatherland Party	FLP	165	0.17%	0	0	0
Green Party	MDG	151	0.15%	0	0	0
Communist Party of Norway	K	65	0.07%	0	0	0
Natural Law Party		65	0.07%	0	0	0
Valid votes		97,514	100.00%	6	0	6
Rejected votes		273	0.28%			
Total polled		97,787	77.77%			
Registered electors		125,740				

The following candidates were elected:

- Constituency seats - John Alvheim (FrP); Ingvald Godal (H); Sigvald Oppebøen Hansen (Ap); Bent Hegna (Ap); Gunn Olsen (Ap); and Bror Yngve Rahm (KrF).

===== 1993 =====
Results of the 1993 parliamentary election held on 12 and 13 September 1993:

Party		Votes	%	Seats		
Party		Votes	%	Con.	Com.	Tot.
Labour Party	Ap	36,374	38.73%	3	0	3
Centre Party	Sp	15,157	16.14%	1	0	1
Conservative Party	H	9,918	10.56%	1	0	1
Christian Democratic Party	KrF	9,499	10.11%	1	0	1
Socialist Left Party	SV	9,377	9.98%	0	1	1
Progress Party	FrP	8,453	9.00%	0	1	1
Liberal Party	V	2,564	2.73%	0	0	0
Pensioners' Party	PP	1,340	1.43%	0	0	0
Red Electoral Alliance	RV	575	0.61%	0	0	0
New Future Coalition Party	SNF	341	0.36%	0	0	0
Fatherland Party	FLP	298	0.32%	0	0	0
Liberal People's Party	DLF	30	0.03%	0	0	0
Valid votes		93,926	100.00%	6	2	8
Rejected votes		324	0.34%			
Total polled		94,250	74.85%			
Registered electors		125,923				

The following candidates were elected:

- Constituency seats - Ragnhild Barland (Ap); Ingvald Godal (H); Sigvald Oppebøen Hansen (Ap); Bent Hegna (Ap); Terje Riis-Johansen (Sp); and Solveig Sollie (KrF).
- Compensatory seats - John Alvheim (FrP); and Børre Rønningen (SV).

==== 1980s ====
===== 1989 =====
Results of the 1989 parliamentary election held on 10 and 11 September 1989:

Party		Votes	%	Seats		
Party		Votes	%	Con.	Com.	Tot.
Labour Party	Ap	37,980	36.85%	2	0	2
Conservative Party	H	17,584	17.06%	1	0	1
Socialist Left Party	SV	14,371	13.94%	1	0	1
Progress Party	FrP	13,001	12.61%	1	0	1
Christian Democratic Party	KrF	10,750	10.43%	1	0	1
Centre Party	Sp	5,266	5.11%	0	0	0
Liberal Party	V	2,590	2.51%	0	0	0
County Lists for Environment and Solidarity	FMS	589	0.57%	0	0	0
Pensioners' Party	PP	586	0.57%	0	0	0
Green Party	MDG	331	0.32%	0	0	0
Liberals-Europe Party		24	0.02%	0	0	0
Valid votes		103,072	100.00%	6	0	6
Rejected votes		168	0.16%			
Total polled		103,240	82.63%			
Registered electors		124,944				

The following candidates were elected:

- Constituency seats - John Alvheim (FrP); Ragnhild Barland (Ap); Ingeborg Botnen (Ap); Ingvald Godal (H); Børre Rønningen (SV); and Solveig Sollie (KrF).

===== 1985 =====
Results of the 1985 parliamentary election held on 8 and 9 September 1985:

Party		Party			List Alliance		
Party		Votes	%	Seats	Votes	%	Seats
Labour Party	Ap	52,213	50.56%	4	52,213	51.29%	3
Conservative Party	H	25,687	24.87%	2	25,268	24.82%	2
Liberal People's Party	DLF	590	0.57%	0	25,268	24.82%	2
Christian Democratic Party	KrF	9,457	9.16%	0	13,343	13.11%	1
Centre Party	Sp	4,340	4.20%	0	13,343	13.11%	1
Socialist Left Party	SV	5,641	5.46%	0	5,641	5.54%	0
Liberal Party	V	2,617	2.53%	0	2,617	2.57%	0
Progress Party	FrP	2,131	2.06%	0	2,131	2.09%	0
Red Electoral Alliance	RV	405	0.39%	0	405	0.40%	0
Communist Party of Norway	K	162	0.16%	0	162	0.16%	0
Free Elected Representatives		23	0.02%	0	23	0.02%	0
Valid votes		103,266	100.00%	6	101,803	100.00%	6
Rejected votes		152	0.15%				
Total polled		103,418	84.12%				
Registered electors		122,938					

As the list alliances were entitled to more seats contesting as alliances than they were contesting as individual parties, the distribution of seats was as list alliance votes. The KrF-Sp list alliance's additional seat was allocated to the Christian Democratic Party.

The following candidates were elected: Ragnhild Barland (Ap); Kjell Bohlin (Ap); Ingeborg Botnen (Ap); Ingvald Godal (H); Jan Helge Jansen (H); and Solveig Sollie (KrF).

===== 1981 =====
Results of the 1981 parliamentary election held on 13 and 14 September 1981:

Party		Votes	%	Seats
Labour Party	Ap	45,965	46.17%	3
Conservative Party	H	22,902	23.00%	2
Christian Democratic Party	KrF	10,736	10.78%	1
Centre Party and Liberal Party	Sp-V	10,187	10.23%	0
Socialist Left Party	SV	6,028	6.05%	0
Progress Party	FrP	2,440	2.45%	0
Red Electoral Alliance	RV	491	0.49%	0
Liberal People's Party	DLF	475	0.48%	0
Communist Party of Norway	K	280	0.28%	0
Plebiscite Party		34	0.03%	0
Free Elected Representatives		21	0.02%	0
Valid votes		99,559	100.00%	6
Rejected votes		119	0.12%	
Total polled		99,678	82.70%	
Registered electors		120,530		

The following candidates were elected: Kjell Bohlin (Ap); Ingeborg Botnen (Ap); Sven Trygve Falck (H); Finn Kristensen (Ap); Jørgen Sønstebø (KrF); and Torstein Tynning (H).

==== 1970s ====
===== 1977 =====
Results of the 1977 parliamentary election held on 11 and 12 September 1977:

Party		Votes	%	Seats
Labour Party	Ap	46,693	49.89%	4
Conservative Party	H	14,481	15.47%	1
Christian Democratic Party	KrF	12,470	13.32%	1
Centre Party	Sp	7,951	8.50%	0
Liberal Party and New People's Party	V-DNF	5,196	5.55%	0
Socialist Left Party	SV	4,805	5.13%	0
Progress Party	FrP	1,159	1.24%	0
Red Electoral Alliance	RV	391	0.42%	0
Communist Party of Norway	K	298	0.32%	0
Single Person's Party		72	0.08%	0
Norwegian Democratic Party		43	0.05%	0
Free Elected Representatives		37	0.04%	0
Valid votes		93,596	100.00%	6
Rejected votes		108	0.12%	
Total polled		93,704	83.06%	
Registered electors		112,814		

The following candidates were elected: Egil Bergsland (Ap); Kjell Bohlin (Ap); Finn Kristensen (Ap); Jørgen Sønstebø (KrF); Torstein Tynning (H); and Turid Dørumsgaard Varsi (Ap).

===== 1973 =====
Results of the 1973 parliamentary election held on 9 and 10 September 1973:

Party		Votes	%	Seats
Labour Party	Ap	32,536	37.26%	2
Socialist Electoral League	SV	14,715	16.85%	1
Christian Democratic Party	KrF	12,577	14.40%	1
Liberal Party and Centre Party	V-Sp	11,913	13.64%	1
Conservative Party	H	9,965	11.41%	1
Anders Lange's Party	ALP	2,909	3.33%	0
New People's Party	DNF	2,139	2.45%	0
Red Electoral Alliance	RV	284	0.33%	0
Single Person's Party		122	0.14%	0
Women's Free Elected Representatives		84	0.10%	0
Norwegian Democratic Party		69	0.08%	0
Valid votes		87,313	100.00%	6
Rejected votes		126	0.14%	
Total polled		87,439	79.82%	
Registered electors		109,550		

The following candidates were elected: Hallvard Eika (V-Sp); Arne Kielland (SV); Finn Kristensen (Ap); Jørgen Sønstebø (KrF); Torstein Tynning (H); and Aslak Versto (Ap).

==== 1960s ====
===== 1969 =====
Results of the 1969 parliamentary election held on 7 and 8 September 1969:

Party		Votes	%	Seats
Labour Party	Ap	47,002	52.41%	3
Christian Democratic Party and Centre Party	KrF-Sp	13,953	15.56%	1
Liberal Party	V	11,983	13.36%	1
Conservative Party	H	11,059	12.33%	1
Socialist People's Party	SF	4,664	5.20%	0
Communist Party of Norway	K	1,012	1.13%	0
Valid votes		89,673	100.00%	6
Rejected votes		165	0.18%	
Total polled		89,838	83.66%	
Registered electors		107,387		

The following candidates were elected: Hallvard Eika (V); Finn Kristensen (Ap); Eigil Olaf Liane (Ap); Johannes Østtveit (KrF-Sp); Torstein Tynning (H); and Aslak Versto (Ap).

===== 1965 =====
Results of the 1965 parliamentary election held on 12 and 13 September 1965:

Party		Votes	%	Seats
Labour Party	Ap	42,952	48.76%	3
Christian Democratic Party	KrF	13,453	15.27%	1
Conservative Party	H	11,369	12.91%	1
Liberal Party	V	11,299	12.83%	1
Socialist People's Party	SF	7,962	9.04%	0
Communist Party of Norway	K	1,049	1.19%	0
Valid votes		88,084	100.00%	6
Rejected votes		297	0.34%	
Total polled		88,381	86.85%	
Registered electors		101,767		

The following candidates were elected: Eigil Olaf Liane (Ap); Sverre Løberg (Ap); Johannes Østtveit (KrF); Harald Selås (Ap); Torkell Tande (V); and Torstein Tynning (H).

===== 1961 =====
Results of the 1961 parliamentary election held on 11 September 1961:

Party		Votes	%	Seats
Labour Party	Ap	40,567	50.96%	3
Liberal Party	V	9,392	11.80%	1
Conservative Party	H	9,098	11.43%	1
Christian Democratic Party	KrF	8,273	10.39%	1
Centre Party	Sp	5,249	6.59%	0
Socialist People's Party	SF	4,513	5.67%	0
Communist Party of Norway	K	2,520	3.17%	0
Valid votes		79,612	100.00%	6
Rejected votes		320	0.40%	
Total polled		79,932	79.93%	
Registered electors		100,007		

The following candidates were elected: Sveinung O. Flaaten (H), 9,096 votes; Jørgen Grave (KrF), 8,268 votes; Eigil Olaf Liane (Ap), 40,562 votes; Sverre Løberg (Ap), 40,559 votes; Harald Selås (Ap), 40,564 votes; and Torkell Tande (V), 9,390 votes.

==== 1950s ====
===== 1957 =====
Results of the 1957 parliamentary election held on 7 October 1957:

Party		Votes	%	Seats
Labour Party	Ap	43,552	55.73%	4
Conservative Party and Farmers' Party	H-Bp	13,586	17.38%	1
Liberal Party	V	9,388	12.01%	1
Christian Democratic Party	KrF	8,331	10.66%	0
Communist Party of Norway	K	2,652	3.39%	0
Norwegian Social Democratic Party		641	0.82%	0
Valid votes		78,150	100.00%	6
Rejected votes		308	0.39%	
Total polled		78,458	79.33%	
Registered electors		98,902		

The following candidates were elected: Halvor Bunkholt (H-Bp); Eigil Olaf Liane (Ap); Sverre Løberg (Ap); Harald Selås (Ap); Torkell Tande (V); and Olav Aslakson Versto (Ap).

===== 1953 =====
Results of the 1953 parliamentary election held on 12 October 1953:

Party		Votes	%	Seats
Labour Party	Ap	40,350	52.33%	4
Liberal Party	V	10,634	13.79%	1
Christian Democratic Party	KrF	8,742	11.34%	1
Conservative Party	H	7,552	9.79%	0
Farmers' Party	Bp	5,513	7.15%	0
Communist Party of Norway	K	4,319	5.60%	0
Valid votes		77,110	100.00%	6
Rejected votes		956	1.22%	
Total polled		78,066	80.51%	
Registered electors		96,965		

The following candidates were elected: Jørgen Grave (KrF); Eigil Olaf Liane (Ap); Sverre Løberg (Ap); Harald Selås (Ap); Neri Valen (V); and Olav Aslakson Versto (Ap).

==== 1940s ====
===== 1949 =====
Results of the 1949 parliamentary election held on 10 October 1949:

Party		Votes	%	Seats
Labour Party	Ap	26,479	48.91%	3
Liberal Party	V	11,030	20.37%	1
Conservative Party and Farmers' Party	H-Bp	7,291	13.47%	1
Christian Democratic Party	KrF	5,542	10.24%	0
Communist Party of Norway	K	3,630	6.71%	0
Society Party	Samfp	164	0.30%	0
Valid votes		54,136	100.00%	5
Rejected votes		367	0.67%	
Total polled		54,503	82.04%	
Registered electors		66,435		

The following candidates were elected: Halvor Bunkholt (H-Bp); Tidemann Flaata Evensen (Ap); Harald Selås (Ap); Neri Valen (V); and Olav Aslakson Versto (Ap).

===== 1945 =====
Results of the 1945 parliamentary election held on 8 October 1945:

Party		Party			List Alliance		
Party		Votes	%	Seats	Votes	%	Seats
Labour Party	Ap	21,179	44.15%	3	21,179	44.15%	3
Liberal Party	V	8,508	17.74%	1	8,508	17.74%	1
Christian Democratic Party	KrF	6,668	13.90%	1	6,668	13.90%	1
Communist Party of Norway	K	6,012	12.53%	0	6,012	12.53%	0
Farmers' Party	Bp	2,837	5.91%	0	5,601	11.68%	0
Conservative Party	H	2,764	5.76%	0	5,601	11.68%	0
Valid votes		47,968	100.00%	5	47,968	100.00%	5
Rejected votes		370	0.77%				
Total polled		48,338	80.43%				
Registered electors		60,099					

As the list alliance was not entitled to more seats contesting as an alliance than it was contesting as individual parties, the distribution of seats was as party votes.

The following candidates were elected: Tidemann Flaata Evensen (Ap); Margit Schiøtt (V); Harald Selås (Ap); Olav Svalastog (KrF); and Olav Aslakson Versto (Ap).

==== 1930s ====
===== 1936 =====
Results of the 1936 parliamentary election held on 19 October 1936:

Party		Party			List Alliance		
Party		Votes	%	Seats	Votes	%	Seats
Labour Party	Ap	20,750	46.46%	3	20,750	46.46%	3
Liberal Party	V	12,940	28.97%	2	12,940	28.97%	1
Farmers' Party	Bp	4,586	10.27%	0	8,986	20.14%	1
Conservative Party	H	4,410	9.87%	0	8,986	20.14%	1
Nasjonal Samling	NS	1,420	3.18%	0	1,420	3.18%	0
Society Party	Samfp	560	1.25%	0	560	1.25%	0
Valid votes		44,666	100.00%	5	44,666	100.00%	5
Rejected votes		216	0.48%				
Total polled		44,882	84.08%				
Registered electors		53,379					

As the list alliance was entitled to more seats contesting as an alliance than it was contesting as individual parties, the distribution of seats was as list alliance votes. The Bp-H list alliance's additional seat was allocated to the Farmers' Party.

The following candidates were elected: Kristian Hansen (Ap); Andreas Gregarsen Sundbø (Bp); Neri Valen (V); Olav Vegheim (Ap); and Olav Aslakson Versto (Ap).

===== 1933 =====
Results of the 1933 parliamentary election held on 16 October 1933:

Party		Party			List Alliance		
Party		Votes	%	Seats	Votes	%	Seats
Labour Party	Ap	16,862	44.36%	3	16,862	44.39%	3
Liberal Party	V	9,111	23.97%	1	9,111	23.98%	1
Farmers' Party	Bp	4,598	12.10%	1	8,190	21.56%	1
Conservative Party	H	3,613	9.51%	0	8,190	21.56%	1
Nasjonal Samling–Villagers	NS-B	3,423	9.01%	0	3,423	9.01%	0
Communist Party of Norway	K	400	1.05%	0	400	1.05%	0
Wild Votes		1	0.00%	0	1	0.00%	0
Valid votes		38,008	100.00%	5	37,987	100.00%	5
Rejected votes		158	0.41%				
Total polled		38,166	74.12%				
Registered electors		51,495					

As the list alliance was not entitled to more seats contesting as an alliance than it was contesting as individual parties, the distribution of seats was as party votes.

The following candidates were elected: Jens Hundseid (Bp); Olav Steinnes (Ap); Neri Valen (V); Olav Vegheim (Ap); and Olav Aslakson Versto (Ap).

===== 1930 =====
Results of the 1930 parliamentary election held on 20 October 1930:

Party		Party			List Alliance		
Party		Votes	%	Seats	Votes	%	Seats
Liberal Party	V	13,354	35.74%	2	14,211	38.04%	2
Radical People's Party	RF	859	2.30%	0	14,211	38.04%	2
Labour Party	Ap	13,037	34.89%	2	13,037	34.90%	2
Farmers' Party	Bp	6,064	16.23%	1	6,064	16.23%	1
Conservative Party	H	3,795	10.16%	0	3,795	10.16%	0
Communist Party of Norway	K	252	0.67%	0	252	0.67%	0
Wild Votes		1	0.00%	0	1	0.00%	0
Valid votes		37,362	100.00%	5	37,360	100.00%	5
Rejected votes		156	0.42%				
Total polled		37,518	76.12%				
Registered electors		49,290					

As the list alliance was not entitled to more seats contesting as an alliance than it was contesting as individual parties, the distribution of seats was as party votes.

The following candidates were elected: Jens Hundseid (Bp); Olav Sannes (V); Olav Steinnes (Ap); Neri Valen (V); and Olav Aslakson Versto (Ap).

==== 1920s ====
===== 1927 =====
Results of the 1927 parliamentary election held on 17 October 1927:

Party		Votes	%	Seats
Labour Party	Ap	12,044	41.72%	2
Liberal Party	V	8,161	28.27%	2
Farmers' Party	Bp	4,757	16.48%	1
Conservative Party and Free-minded Liberal Party	H-FV	2,902	10.05%	0
Communist Party of Norway	K	1,006	3.48%	0
Valid votes		28,870	100.00%	5
Rejected votes		251	0.86%	
Total polled		29,121	61.54%	
Registered electors		47,317		

The following candidates were elected: Jens Hundseid (Bp); Gjermund Grivi (V); Olav Sannes (V); Olav Steinnes (Ap); and Olav Aslakson Versto (Ap).

===== 1924 =====
Results of the 1924 parliamentary election held on 21 October 1924:

Party		Votes	%	Seats
Liberal Party	V	8,026	27.21%	2
Labour Party	Ap	6,413	21.74%	1
Conservative Party and Free-minded Liberal Party	H-FV	5,311	18.00%	1
Farmers' Party	Bp	4,635	15.71%	1
Social Democratic Labour Party of Norway	S	2,036	6.90%	0
Communist Party of Norway	K	1,866	6.33%	0
Radical People's Party	RF	1,213	4.11%	0
Wild Votes		1	0.00%	0
Valid votes		29,501	100.00%	5
Rejected votes		380	1.27%	
Total polled		29,881	64.67%	
Registered electors		46,204		

The following candidates were elected: Jens Hundseid (Bp); Herman Løvenskiold (H-FV); Olav Sannes (V); Ketil Skogen (V); and Olav Steinnes (Ap).

===== 1921 =====
Results of the 1921 parliamentary election held on 24 October 1921:

Party		Votes	%	Seats
Liberal Party and Radical People's Party	V-RF	9,396	34.95%	2
Labour Party	Ap	6,828	25.40%	2
Conservative Party and Free-minded Liberal Party	H-FV	5,369	19.97%	1
Norwegian Farmers' Association	L	3,258	12.12%	0
Social Democratic Labour Party of Norway	S	1,992	7.41%	0
Wild Votes		41	0.15%	0
Valid votes		26,884	100.00%	5
Rejected votes		309	1.14%	
Total polled		27,193	60.89%	
Registered electors		44,660		

The following candidates were elected: Gjermund Grivi (V-RF); Herman Løvenskiold (H-FV); Tor Ovaldsen Lundtveit (Ap); Olav Steinnes (Ap); and Ivar Petterson Tveiten (V-RF).
