= Torkell Tande =

Norwegian politician

Torkell Tande (11 September 1901 – 8 February 2001) was a Norwegian politician for the Liberal Party.

He was born in Nissedal Municipality. He was elected to the Norwegian Parliament from Telemark in 1958, and was re-elected on two occasions. He had previously been a deputy representative during the terms 1945–1949, 1950–1953 and 1954–, but he replaced the deceased Neri Valen in January 1954 and sat through the term.

Tande was mayor of Sannidal Municipality in 1937–1941 and 1945. His successor in the position, Eigil Olaf Liane or the Labour Party, later served as a member of Parliament as well.
