= Herman Løvenskiold =

Herman Løvenskiold may refer to:

- Herman Løvenskiold (1783–1825), Danish baron, county governor of Holbæk and Svendborg
- Herman Løvenskiold (politician) (1869–1927), Norwegian military officer and politician for the Conservative Party
- Herman Severin Løvenskiold (1815–1870), Norwegian composer
- Herman L. Løvenskiold (1897–1982), Norwegian ornithologist, photographer, government scholar and author on heraldry
