= Dørumsgaard =

Dørumsgaard is a Norwegian surname. Notable people with the surname include:

- Arne Dørumsgaard (1921–2006), Norwegian composer, poet, translator, and music collector
- Turid Dørumsgaard Varsi (born 1938), Norwegian politician
