= Schiøtt =

Schiøtt is a surname. Notable people with the surname include:

- August Schiøtt (1823–1895), Danish portrait painter
- Margit Schiøtt (1889–1946), Norwegian politician
- Emilie Schiøtt (1991), Danish singer
