= Jørgen Sønstebø =

Norwegian politician (1922–2013)

Jørgen Sønstebø (13 February 1922 – 29 June 2013) was a Norwegian bailiff and politician for the Christian Democratic Party.

He was born in Bø Municipality as a son of farmers. He took lower education, then officer's training from 1939 to the German invasion of Norway in 1940. During the war he took middle school as a private candidate in 1941, while working as a farm and forest labourer, later police training. He was decorated with the Defence Medal 1940–1945.

He was a police officer in Hjartdal Municipality 1945 to 1952, Kviteseid Municipality 1952 to 1958, and Gjerpen Municipality/Siljan Municipality from 1958 to 1964. After a period as acting bailiff in Gransherad Municipality 1964 to 1965 he returned to Kviteseid Municipality. He served as bailiff here from 1971 to 1989. He settled in Bø Municipality where he took over the family farm Nyhus in 1973. From 1989 to 2005 he was a self-made auctioneer.

On the local level he was a member of the municipal councils of Gjerpen Municipality from 1959 to 1963, Skien Municipality from 1963 to 1965 and Kviteseid Municipality from 1967 to 1979 and 1987 to 1995. From 1963 to 1965 he was a member of Telemark county council. He chaired the county party chapter from 1966 to 1970, and the local party chapter on multiple occasions.

He was elected to the Parliament of Norway from Telemark in 1973, and was re-elected on two occasions in 1977 and 1981. He served as the party whip during his first term. He was a member of the Standing Committee on Justice for all his three terms, advancing to deputy chair during his last term. He was also a member of the Preparatory Credentials Committee for his two last terms and the Standing Committee on Scrutiny during his last term. He was decorated with the King's Medal of Merit in silver in 1989.

Sønstebø also held various other posts. He was a board member of Telemark Hospital from 1970 to 1983 and member of the corporate council of Norsk Hydro from 1986 to 1992. He also volunteered for his local Pentecostal congregation.
