= Hegna =

Hegna is a surname. Notable people with the surname include:

- Bent Hegna (born 1959), Norwegian politician
- Collin Hegna, American musician, composer, and recording engineer
- Per Hegna (1945–2026), Norwegian tennis player
- Trond Hegna (1898–1992), Norwegian author, journalist, and editor
