= Lise Wiik =

Norwegian politician

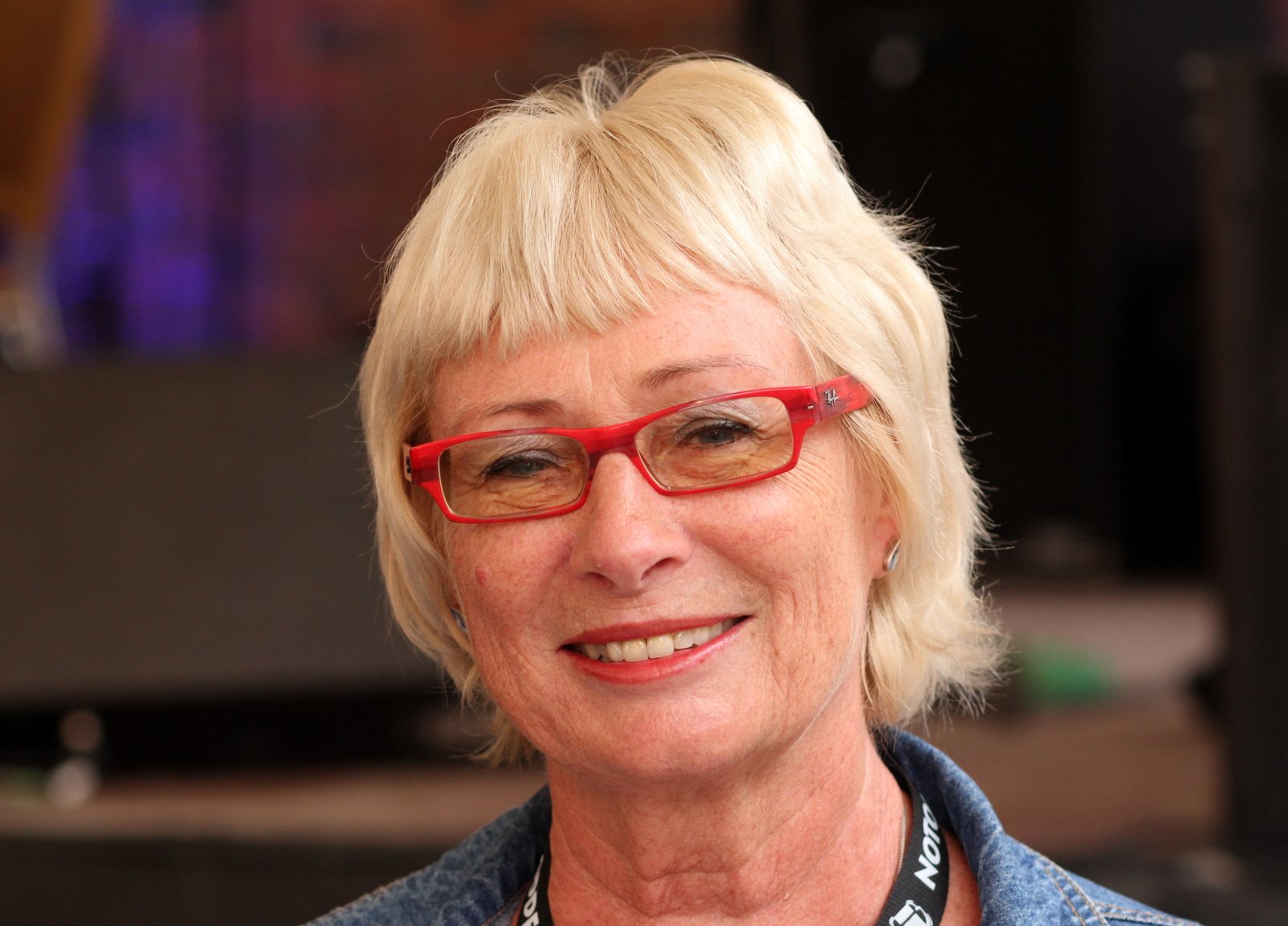
Lise Wiik, 2013.

Lise Solveig Wiik (born 23 March 1947) is a Norwegian teacher, researcher and politician for the Labour Party.

She served as a deputy representative to the Parliament of Norway from Telemark during the terms 2001–2005, 2005–2009 and 2013–2017. On the local level Wiik was the mayor of Notodden Municipality from 2007 to 2011, and she has served as a member of Telemark County Council.

She has been a lecturer and dean at Telemark University College, chair of the Notodden Blues Festival since 2010 and the Telemark Research Institute since 2011.
