= Hans Edvard Askjer =

Norwegian politician (born 1962)

Member of the Storting
- Incumbent
- Assumed office 1 October 2025
- Constituency: Telemark

Deputy County Mayor of Telemark
- In office 13 October 2015 – 31 December 2019
- Mayor: Sven Tore Løkslid
- Preceded by: Lise Wiik
- Succeeded by: none (Telemark merged into Vestfold og Telemark)

Personal details
- Born: 27 February 1962 (age 64)
- Party: Christian Democratic

Hans Edvard Askjer (born 1962) is a Norwegian politician from the Christian Democratic Party (KrF). He was elected to the Storting in the 2025 Norwegian parliamentary election.

Before entering the Storting, Askjer was active in the local politics of Skien city council since 2007, and also served as the deputy mayor of Telemark county from 2015 to 2019.
