= Aslakson =

Aslakson may refer to:

- Josie Aslakson (born 1995), American wheelchair basketball player
- Olav Aslakson Versto (1892–1977), Norwegian politician
