= Erik Qvam =

Norwegian military officer and writer

Erik Hafslo Qvam (12 September 1897 – 13 April 1979) was a Norwegian military officer and writer.

He was born in Kristiania as a son of customs inspector Eystein Hafslo Qvam (1865–1943) and Ragna Kathrine Erichsen (1872–1951). He was married to Friede Løvenskiold (1902–1948), the brother of Herman L. Løvenskiold and a daughter of Herman Løvenskiold, from 1928 to her death. From 1952 he was married to Nanna Burckhardt.

He enrolled as a student in 1916, and reached the rank of Premier Lieutenant in 1919 and Captain in 1935. He attended the Norwegian Military College in 1921, and General Staff training in 1932. He served as a chief of staff in the General Staff, and received the Defence Medal 1940–1945 for active service in the Second World War. In 1946 he reached the rank of Colonel, and from 1946 to 1962 he headed the Nord-Trøndelag Infantry Regiment (IR13). The regiment contributed a battalion to the Independent Norwegian Brigade Group in Germany between 1947 and 1952.

Qvam was a prolific writer on military and strategic questions. Smaller publications in the 1930s include Sannheten om militærvesenet (1930), Kan vi forsvare oss i en moderne krig (1930) and De store sosiale bevegelser i vår tid (1934, reissued 1935 and 1939). In 1963 he released Randstaten Norge.

He also ran the farm Gjævran from 1946 to 1965. The farm was then passed down to his son Eystein Hafslo Qvam. He died in April 1979 and was buried at Egge Church.
