= Tone Berge Hansen =

Norwegian politician

Deputy Member of the Storting
- Incumbent
- Assumed office 1 October 2021
- Deputising for: Lene Vågslid (2025–)
- Constituency: Telemark

Personal details
- Born: 14 November 1968 (age 57)
- Party: Labour
- Occupation: Health administrator Politician

Tone Berge Hansen (born 14 November 1968) is a Norwegian politician for the Labour Party. A deputy to the Storting from Telemark since 2021, she has met as deputy for Lene Vågslid since February 2025.

== Personal life ==
Born on 14 November 1968, Hansen hails from Brevik.

== Political career ==
=== Parliament ===
Hansen was elected deputy representative to the Storting from the constituency of Telemark at the 2021 election. She has been deputising for Lene Vågslid from February 2025 while Vågslid is serving in government.

== Civic career ==
From 2019 to 2022 Hansen had an administrative position (section leader) at Telemark Hospital. From 2022 she had a position as subdirector at the Norwegian Labour and Welfare Administration (NAV).
