= Konstanse Marie Alvær =

Norwegian politician (born 2002)

Deputy Member of the Storting
- Incumbent
- Assumed office 1 October 2025
- Deputising for: Lene Vågslid (2025–)
- Constituency: Telemark

Personal details
- Born: 22 July 2002 (age 24)
- Party: Labour Party

Konstanse Marie Alvær (born 22 July 2002) is a Norwegian politician and deputy member of the Storting. A member of the Labour Party, she has represented Telemark since October 2025.

Alvær was born on 22 July 2002 and is from Porsgrunn. She is an assistant in a care home in Bamble Municipality. She is a youth representative of the Norwegian Union of Municipal and General Employees (Fagforbundet) in Telemark.

Alvær has been involved with the Labour Party since joining its youth wing, the Workers' Youth League (AUF), in October 2018. She has held various positions in the Labour Party and AUF. She is a member of Telemark County Council. She was the Labour Party's fourth placed candidate in Telemark at the 2025 parliamentary election but the party won only two seats in the constituency. She became the party's second deputy representative (Vararepresentant) in the constituency. She entered the Storting on 1 October 2025 as a permanent substitute for Minister of Children and Families Lene Vågslid.
