= Ketil Skogen =

Norwegian politician

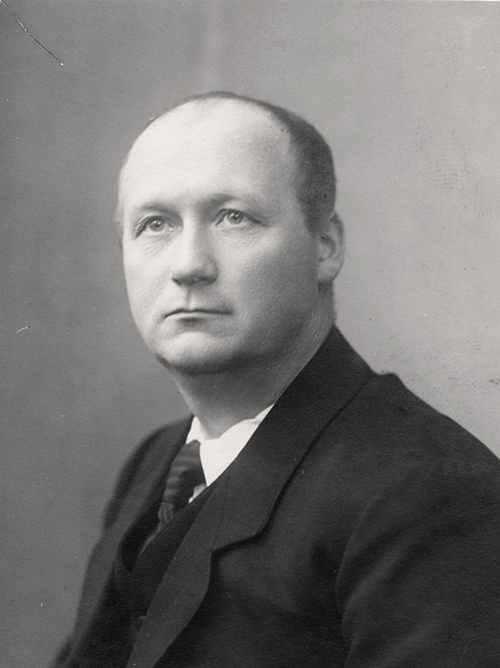
Photo from the 1920's

Ketil Skogen (26 August 1884 – 21 March 1970) was a Norwegian politician for the Liberal Party. He was born in Saude Municipality.

He was educated as jurist from the University of Oslo from 1909. He was the first to write his exam in Norwegian language (nynorsk) which at that time were not allowed and paid a heavy price for that, but passed due to his brilliant performance. He was prosecutor in the last impeachment case in Norway against the government of Berge in 1926. He was elected to the Norwegian Parliament from Telemark in 1925, and served five terms in the position of deputy representative: 1919–1921, 1928–1930, 1931–1933, 1945–1949 and 1950–1953. During his fourth and fifth terms as deputy representative he sat through parts of the term as a regular representative, replacing the deceased Margit Schiøtt and Neri Valen respectively. In his later years he was involved in writing the Norwegian Civil Code.

Skogen was a member of the municipal council of Sauherad Municipality during the term 1910–1913, and was deputy mayor in 1919–1922.
