= Jan Helge Jansen =

Norwegian politician (1937–2024)

Jan Helge Jansen (1 July 1937 – 7 May 2024) was a Norwegian priest and politician for the Conservative Party.

== Biography ==
Jansen was born in Bergen as a son of self-made businessman Harald Jansen (1903–1985) and housewife Helene Valvatne (1906–1987). He enrolled as a student in 1957, and graduated from the University of Oslo with the cand.theol. degree in 1965. While studying he chaired the Conservative Students' Association in 1961 and the Norwegian Students' Society for half a year in 1964. He took the practical priest education in 1966, and after serving in His Majesty The King's Guard in 1967 he worked as a curate at Gjerpen Church from 1968 to 2003. He was a member of the municipal council of Skien Municipality from 1971 to 1985 and 1991 to 1999. He served as a deputy representative to the Parliament of Norway from Telemark during the term 1977–1981, was elected in the 1981 election and served one term. He was a member of the Standing Committee on Social Affairs. He chaired the Conservative Party branch in Telemark from 1976 to 1986, and was a member of the Conservative Party central board during the same period.

Jansen died on 7 May 2024, at the age of 86.
