= Shirley Bottolfsen =

Irish humanitarian activist (1934–2021)

- Born: 12 February 1934; County Tipperary, Ireland
- Died: 24 December 2021 (aged 87); Bodø, Nordland County, Norway
- Occupation: philanthropist
- Movement: Salvation Army

Shirley Isabelle Theresa Bernadette Bottolfsen (12 February 1934 – 24 December 2021) was an Irish humanitarian activist based in Bodø, Norway. For over forty years she raised money to help the poor.

== Biography ==
Bottolfsen was born in County Tipperary, Ireland, on 12 February 1934 as the eldest of five children in a Catholic family. She immigrated to Bodø in 1956 with her first husband, Ivar Larsen, a Norwegian sailor. He died at sea a few years later, leaving her with two young children. In 1983 she remarried to Per Bottolfsen, a dentist.

Bottolfsen worked with the Salvation Army and the municipality, but also as a one-person fundraising group. Her primary fundraising method was to stand for hours in the Glasshuset (glass house) covered section of the pedestrian precinct in central Bodø with a collection bucket; she also ran a summer lottery. As of 2005 she had raised 7 million kroner. She was a benefactor to a children's home in Lithuania. She raised several hundred thousand kroner for the poor and elderly in Porsanger Municipality; when honoured by the municipality in 2009, she donated the monetary award in the form of a 70-person coffee service and tablecloths. She delivered food to needy people's homes in Bodø six days a week, and gave Christmas gifts to the poor every year starting on 22 December. In 2004 she donated security alarms to elderly people in Bodø and then protested the municipality's requiring service fees from those people. In 2012 she raised money for some Roma families to return home to Romania, but felt misused when they returned to Oslo.

For her volunteer and humanitarian work, she was awarded the King's Medal of Merit in silver in 2005. The same year, the Norwegian TV company TV 2 made a documentary about her called Julenissen kommer fra Irland (Santa comes from Ireland). In 2014, she received an international humanitarian prize from the Lions Club; the local Lions Club leader had sought the award for her for over twenty years. She was also awarded the Progress Party's John Ingolf Alvheim Prize in 2014. She features in the music video for the song "Mirage" by Heyerdahl.

Bottolfsen had lived in the same house in Bodø since 1977. Her husband died in 2012; the following year, a group of volunteers repaired her house as a thank you to her. However, since she was having a rental flat created without building permission, the municipality ordered all work to stop. She died in Bodø on 24 December 2021, at the age of 87.
