= Ingeborg Botnen =

Norwegian politician (1934–2022)

Member of Parliament of Norway
- In office 1981–1993
- Constituency: Telemark

Personal details
- Born: 9 February 1934 Brandbu, Norway
- Died: 17 March 2022 (aged 88) Oslo, Norway
- Party: Norwegian Labour Party

Ingeborg Botnen (9 February 1934 – 17 March 2022) was a Norwegian politician for the Norwegian Labour Party. She was a member of the Parliament of Norway from 1981 to 1993, representing Telemark.

== Political career ==
=== Local politics ===
Botnen was elected member of the municipal council in Tinn Municipality from 1963 to 1983, and from 1995 to 1999.

=== Parliament ===
She was elected representative to the Storting from the constituency of Telemark for three periods. During the first period, from 1981 to 1985, she was a member of Kommunal- og miljøvernkomiteen. During her second period, she was a member of the Standing Committee on Transport and Communications from 1985 to 1986, and of the Standing Committee on Foreign Affairs and Defence from 1986 to 1989. During her third period at the Storting, from 1989 to 1993, she was a member of the Standing Committee on Education, Research and Church Affairs, and of the Standing Committee on Scrutiny and Constitutional Affairs from 1992 to 1993.

== Administrative positions ==
Botnen was a board member of The Norwegian Writers' Center from 1972 to 1980. She was board member of the film production company Norsk Film from 1980 to 1981, board member of the Norwegian Association of Local and Regional Authorities from 1980 to 1984, and board member of the Norwegian Labour Movement Archives and Library from 1982. She was board member of the Norwegian Industrial Workers Museum from 1996 to 2000.

== Personal life ==
Botnen was born in Brandbu on 9 February 1934, a daughter of Kristen Stenbråten and Kari Løvbrøtte. She was educated as librarian, and managed the public library in Rjukan from 1972 to 2003.

She died on 17 March 2022, at the age of 88.
