= Olav Svalastog =

Norwegian politician (1896–1979)

Olav Svalastog (27 July 1896 – 16 October 1979) was a Norwegian politician for the Christian Democratic Party.

He was elected to the Norwegian Parliament from Telemark in 1945, but was not re-elected in 1949. Svalastog was a member of the municipal council of Solum Municipality from 1955 to 1957.

He was born in Nissedal Municipality, Svalastog worked as a teacher in Vrådal, Treungen, Tveit, Solum, and Fjære.
