= Geir Jørgen Bekkevold =

Norwegian priest and politician

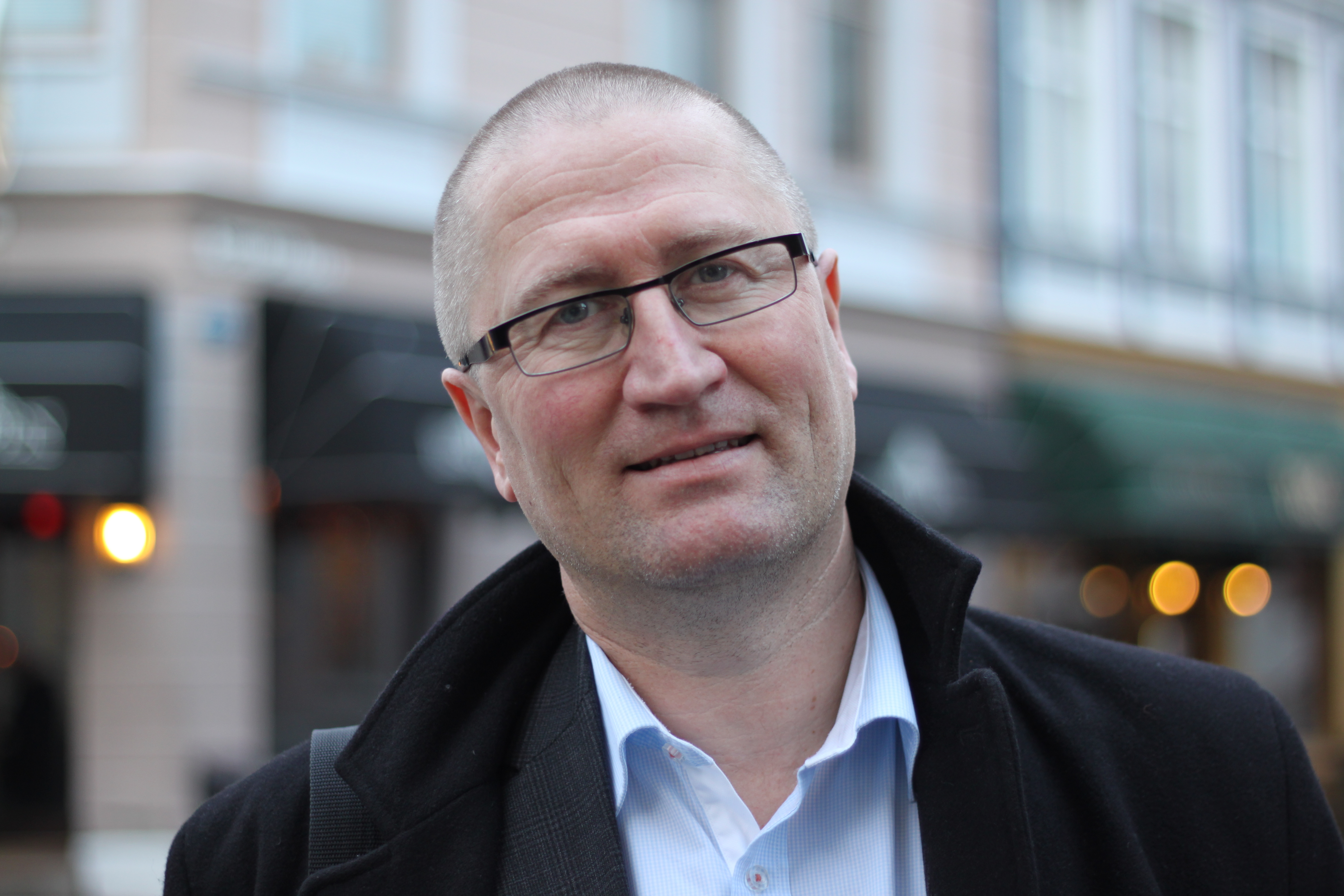
Geir J. Bekkevold

Geir Jørgen Bekkevold (born 19 November 1963) is a Norwegian priest and politician for the Christian Democratic Party.

He was born in Horten Municipality as the son of laborer Jan Egil Bekkevold and housewife Evy Bekkevold. He finished his secondary education in Horten in 1982, and attended the University of Oslo from 1983 to 1991. Here, he received the cand.theol. degree underwent the practical-theological seminary. He worked as a field priest during his compulsory military service from 1991 to 1992, and then became curate for Gjerpen Church. In 2005 he was promoted to vicar in Borgestad in Skien Municipality.

Bekkevold became involved in politics as a member of Skien city council from 1999 to 2009, the last two years in the executive committee. From 2003 to 2007, he was also a member of Telemark county council. He chaired the local chapter from his party from 2007 to 2008, and the regional chapter in Telemark from 2008. He was elected to the Parliament of Norway from Telemark in 2009. He became a member of the Standing Committee on Local Government and Public Administration, Like his entire party group, he also joined Israels Venner på Stortinget.

Bekkevold has also been active in YMCA/YWCA locally. He was a board member of Teater Ibsen from 2004 to 2008, and the county library from 2007. In 2020, Bekkevold became chair for UWC Red Cross Nordic board in Fjaler Municipality, Norway.
