= Mahmoud Farahmand =

Norwegian politician

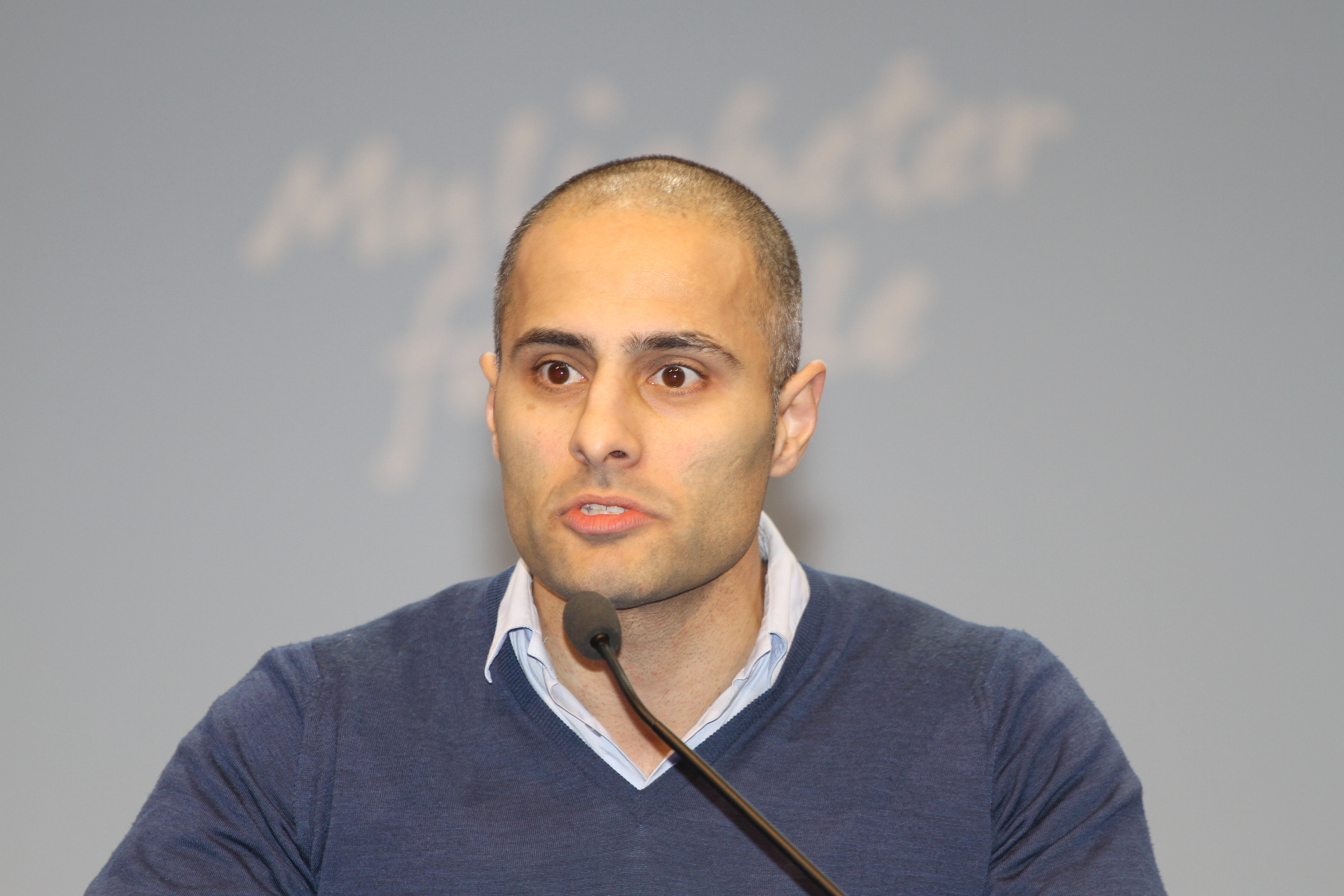

Member of the Storting
- Incumbent
- Assumed office 1 October 2021
- Constituency: Telemark

Deputy Member of the Storting
- In office 1 October 2017 – 30 September 2021
- Constituency: Telemark

Personal details
- Born: 15 September 1979 (age 46) Karaj, Iran
- Party: Conservative
- Occupation: Politician

Mahmoud Farahmand (born 15 September 1979) is a Norwegian politician.

He was elected representative to the Storting from the constituency of Telemark in 2021, for the Conservative Party. He was re-elected in 2025. He was deputy representative to the Storting 2017–2021.
