= Harald Selås =

Norwegian politician

Harald Selås (17 August 1908 – 24 September 1986) was a Norwegian politician for the Labour Party. He was born in Holt Municipality.

He was elected to the Norwegian Parliament from Telemark in 1945, and was re-elected on five occasions. He had previously been a deputy representative from 1958–1961.

Selås was a member of the municipal council for Tinn Municipality in the period 1937–1940.
