= Jørgen Grave =

Norwegian politician (1909–1988)

Jørgen Grave (28 March 1909 – 21 January 1988) was a Norwegian politician for the Christian Democratic Party.

He was born in Drangedal Municipality. He was elected to the Norwegian Parliament from Telemark in 1954, and was re-elected on one occasion.

On the local level Grave was a member of the municipal council of Drangedal Municipality from 1947 to 1957.

Outside politics Grave worked as a secretary in Det norske lutherske Indremisjonsselskap. He also worked in Vårt Land.
