= Stein Versto =

Norwegian writer and folk musician

- Born: 30 December 1957 (age 68); Vinje Municipality, Norway
- Occupations: poet, novelist, translator and folk musician

Stein Versto (born 30 December 1957) is a Norwegian poet, novelist, translator, and folk musician.

== Biography ==
He was born in Vinje Municipality, and is the brother of newspaper editor Olav Versto. He made his literary debut in 1990 with the short story collection Ho blei borte i trappene, for which he was awarded the Tarjei Vesaas' debutantpris. Among his poetry collections are Innfalda tid, minne from 1995 and Snø i partituret from 2000. He wrote the novel Nidaros in 2013. His music album Urjen from 2011 contains tunes played on the Hardanger fiddle. He also resided in Asker.
