= Lene Vågslid =

Norwegian politician

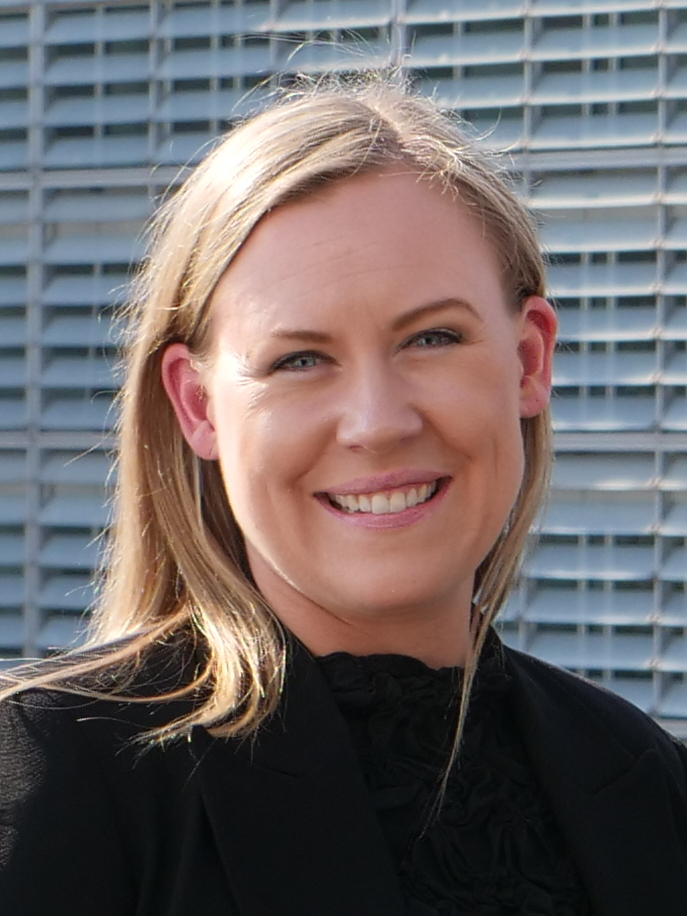
- Vågslid in 2025

Minister of Children and Families
- Incumbent
- Assumed office 4 February 2025
- Prime Minister: Jonas Gahr Støre
- Preceded by: Kjersti Toppe

Deputy Parliamentary Leader of the Labour Party
- In office 23 March 2022 – 4 February 2025 Serving with Åsmund Grøver Aukrust
- Leader: Rigmor Aasrud
- Preceded by: Terje Aasland
- Succeeded by: Ingvild Kjerkol; Tuva Moflag

Member of the Storting
- Incumbent
- Assumed office 1 October 2013
- Deputy: Tone E. Berge Hansen; Konstanse Marie Alvær
- Constituency: Telemark

Deputy Member of the Storting
- In office 1 October 2009 – 30 September 2013
- Constituency: Telemark

Personal details
- Born: 17 March 1986 (age 40) Tokke Municipality, Telemark, Norway
- Party: Labour
- Domestic partner: Arild Grande
- Children: 1
- Occupation: Teacher

Lene Vågslid (born 17 March 1986) is a Norwegian teacher and politician for the Labour Party. She has served as a member of the Parliament of Norway for Telemark since 2013 after having served as a deputy representative between 2009 and 2013. She has served as the minister of children and families since 2025.

== Political career ==
=== Parliament ===
Vågsild was elected as a deputy member from Telemark in 2009 and held the position until 2013, when she was elected as a regular representative. She has been re-elected since.

In parliament, she sat on the Standing Committee on Justice between 2013 and 2017 before leading it from 2017 to 2021. She then joined the Standing Committee on Local Government and Public Administration in 2021, which she led until her ministerial appointment in February 2025.

On 23 March 2022, she and Åsmund Grøver Aukrust were appointed new deputy parliamentary leaders in the aftermath of Terje Aasland's appointment to the government. When she and Åsmund Grøver Aukrust were appointed to government, the party chose Ingvild Kjerkol and Tuva Moflag as their successors.

While serving in government from February 2025, Tone E. Berge Hansen deputised in her place until September of the same year. From October 2025, Konstanse Marie Alvær has deputised for her.

=== Minister of Children and Families ===
Following the Centre Party's withdrawal from government, she was appointed minister of children and families on 4 February 2025.

==== 2025 ====
A week after assuming office, criticism was levelled against NRK presenter Fredrik Solvang when he questioned how Vågslid in a recent Debatten episode, could manage her personal life due to having abstained from participating in the programme before becoming minister. Former culture minister Anette Trettebergstuen and Christian Democratic Party deputy leader Ida Lindtveit Røse argued that the editorial team was enforcing stereotypes with the question and Solvang argued that the question wasn't intended to criticise Vågslid's capability to be minister. Vågslid herself stated that she hadn't taken offence by the question.

Following revelations of children in child care institutions getting access to drugs, Vågslid announced in April that the government would be looking to allow institutional staff to search children's phones as a measure to establish boundaries for their freedom of movement in institutions. Furthermore, hospitals would receive the responsibility to take care of drug addicted children under the age of eighteen, rather than the child welfare service.

In late May, prime minister Jonas Gahr Støre and Vågslid announced that the government would be putting forward a law proposal that would seek to lower the age limit for social media to 15. There would however be an exception for video games, communication services utilised in relation to school and services utilised for purchases. Both also conceded that enforcing the law would be challenging as the proposal would be sent out on hearing for feedback.

Verdens Gang revealed that more than 828 children had been moved out of the country while their families were investigated by the Child Welfare Services in the last three years, and at least 72 had been abducted before the Child Welfare Services could take custody of them. Vågslid stated in September that the government would aim for improved national statistics over moves and the same would go for Bufdir.

After a commission specialising in Child Welfare institutional reform presented their report, the Conservative Party called for the abolishment of the current system of the child welfare services. Vågslid expressed that she was open to reform the structure of the child welfare services if it would lead to an improved service.

==== 2026 ====
In June 2026, she argued that the government's ban on social media for children under the age of sixteen was scientifically justified and that they had followed advice on the issue. This was despite the contrary of not being any Norwegian research which backed her claims. Vågslid further argued that there is a connection between deteriating mental health and the use of social media, but remarked that not all caused are equally as clear.

Vågslid revealed in October that the government was looking to extend their policy on age restriction on social media platforms, this time also targeting video games that they deemed could be harmful for young children. This age restriction would also be set at age 16 just like their social media platforms age restriction, and would notably encompass Roblox. She also didn't rule out it also encompassing platforms like TikTok and YouTube. Generally the restriction would also be targeted at video game platforms that are algorithm driven and conduct illegal marketing targeting children.

She visited Australia in November and met with Australian communications minister Anika Wells. Vågslid expressed that some takeaways from her visit would help in drafting a law back in Norway regarding social media usage and age restrictions, highlighting the possibility of implementing a term of policy for damaging content, and furthermore that doom scrolling and algorithms would be affected by the new law. Similarly to Australia, she reiterated that it would be up to the tech companies to enforce age verification in accordance with local law.

== Personal life ==
She hails from Tokke Municipality. She is currently in a domestic partnership with Arild Grande, with whom she has one daughter.
