= Halvor Bunkholt =

Norwegian politician (1903–1978)

Halvor Bunkholt (17 June 1903 – 9 May 1978) is a Norwegian politician for the Farmer's Party.

He was born in Saude Municipality. He was elected to the Norwegian Parliament from Telemark in 1950, and was re-elected on one occasion.

Bunkholt was a member of the municipal council of Sauherad Municipality from 1934 to 1971, serving as deputy mayor in 1970–1971. He chaired the countywide party chapter from 1945 to 1947.

Outside politics he graduated from the police academy and spent most of his career as bailiff. Having worked nine years as an assistant banker, he sat on the board for local savings banks.
