= Åslaug Sem-Jacobsen =

Norwegian politician

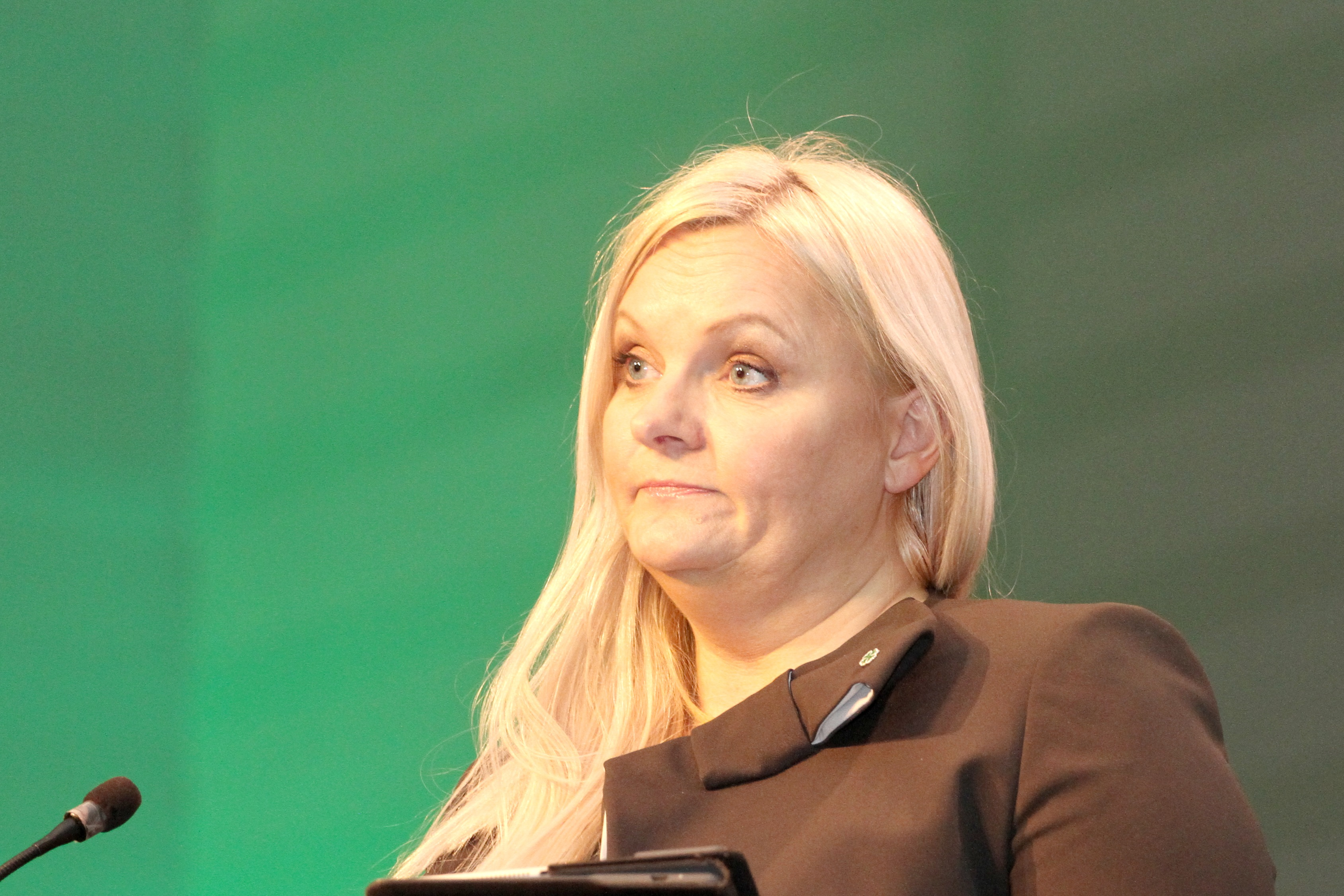
- Sem-Jacobsen in 2017
- Born: 5 April 1971 (age 55)
- Education: Journalism; Political science Gimlekollen NLA College; University of Oslo
- Occupations: Journalist and politician
- Political party: Centre Party
- Children: Hallvard Sem-Jacobsen

Åslaug Sem-Jacobsen (born 5 April 1971) is a Norwegian journalist and politician for the Centre Party. Representing Telemark, she has been member of the Storting since 2017.

== Personal life and education ==
Sem-Jacobsen was born on 5 April 1971. She is educated journalist from Gimlekollen NLA College, was assigned with NRK for several years, and has studied political science at the University of Oslo.

== Political career ==
Sem-Jacobsen was member of the municipal council in Notodden Municipality from 2011 to 2019. She was deputy mayor in Notodden from 2015 to 2017, and member of the county council of Telemark from 2015 to 2019. She was elected representative to the Storting from the constituency of Telemark for the period 2017–2021 for the Centre Party. In the Storting she was a member of the Standing Committee on Family and Cultural Affairs from 2017 to 2021. She was re-elected to the Storting for the period 2021–2025, and became second deputy leader of the Standing Committee on Family and Cultural Affairs from 2021.
