= Torstein Tynning =

Norwegian politician

Torstein Tynning (4 June 1932 – 18 November 2000) was a Norwegian politician for the Conservative Party.

He was elected to the Norwegian Parliament from Telemark in 1965, and was re-elected on four occasions. He had previously served in the position of deputy representative during the term 1961–1965.

Tynning was born in Eidanger Municipality. He was involved in local politics in Eidanger Municipality and its successor Porsgrunn Municipality between 1959 and 1971.

He was the father of journalist Signe Tynning and grandfather of Labour politician Christian Tynning Bjørnø.
