= Terje Svabø =

Norwegian journalist

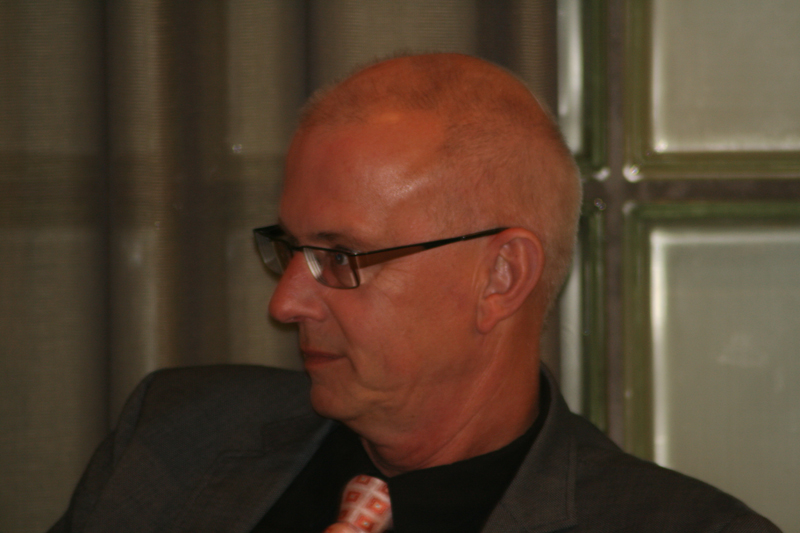
Terje Svabø in 2009

Terje Svabø (born 4 October 1952) is a Norwegian journalist.

Svabø has worked at Aftenposten, VG and NRK evening news, where he hosted the debate programs Debatt 21 (Debate 21) and Til debatt (English: To Debate). In 2000 he left NRK and joined the public relations agency Dinamo. He has also been general manager of the think tank Civita.

Until 2009, he worked as a news anchor at TV 2 Nyhetskanalen. He was for a while a freelance journalist in Vienna, where his wife Astrid Versto worked at the Norwegian embassy.

== Publications ==
- with Bjørn Egil Eide. Smilets revolusjon: Cory Aquinos filippinske revolusjon. Oslo: Cappelen, 1986. ISBN 978-82-02-10692-8
- with Erling Norvik. Hiv dokker i kalosjan. Oslo: Cappelen, 1990. ISBN 978-82-02-12724-4
- with Inge Grødum. "Lillyhammer" : OL '94 sett fra utlandet. Oslo: Cappelen, 1994. ISBN 978-82-02-14143-1
- Tampa. Lysaker: Dinamo, 2002. ISBN 978-82-8071-005-5
- "Norsk offentlig debatt blottet for helhetstenkning". Opinion article. Aftenposten March 11, 2004. Updated December 9, 2010.
