= Tobias Drevland Lund =

Norwegian politician (born 1996)

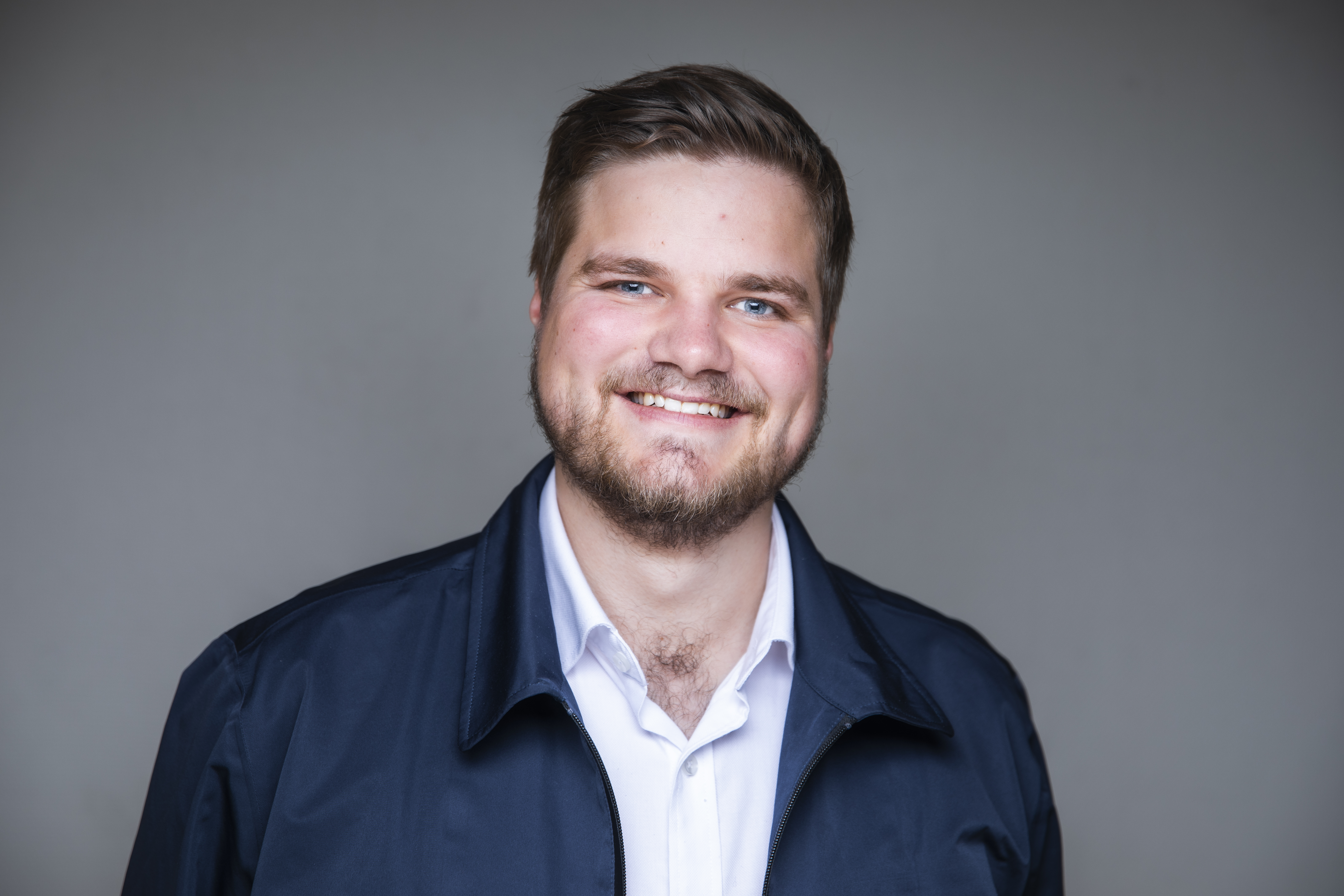

Member of the Storting
- In office 1 October 2021 – 30 September 2025
- Constituency: Telemark

Personal details
- Born: 11 May 1996 (age 30) Kragerø Municipality, Norway
- Party: Red
- Education: University of Oslo
- Occupation: Politician

Tobias Drevland Lund (born 11 May 1996) is a Norwegian politician.

== Personal life and education ==
Born in Kragerø Municipality on 11 May 1996, Drevland studied political science at the University of Oslo from 2015 to 2017.

== Political career ==
Drevland chaired Red Youth from 2018 to 2020. He was elected representative to the Storting from the constituency of Telemark for the period 2021–2025, for the Red Party. In the Storting, he was a member of the Standing Committee on Local Government and Public Administration from 2021 to 2025.
