= Line Marlene Haugen =

Norwegian politician (born 1993)

Member of the Storting
- Incumbent
- Assumed office 1 October 2025
- Constituency: Telemark

Personal details
- Born: 3 March 1993 (age 33)
- Party: Progress Party

Line Marlene Ånundsdotter Haugen (born 3 March 1993) is a Norwegian politician who was elected member of the Storting in 2025. She has been a member of the municipal council of Notodden Municipality since 2021.
