= Ragnhild Barland =

Norwegian politician (1934–2015)

Ragnhild Barland (29 September 1934 – 27 November 2015) was a Norwegian politician for the Labour Party.

Barland was born in Holla Municipality in Telemark county. She was elected to the Norwegian Parliament from Telemark in 1985, and was re-elected on two occasions.

Barland was involved in local politics in the municipal council of Skien Municipality from 1975 to 1985, serving as deputy mayor in 1983–1985.

Outside politics she worked as a high school teacher from 1957. In 1975 he was promoted to school inspector. She was involved in the teachers' union Norsk lektorlag, and was board chairman of the sports club Gjerpen IF from 1972 to 1975.
