= Christian Tynning Bjørnø =

Norwegian politician (born 1985)

Christian Tynning Bjørnø (Far Left)

Christian Tynning Bjørnø (born 27 November 1985) is a Norwegian politician for the Labour Party. He was elected to the Parliament of Norway from Telemark in 2013 where he is a member of the Standing Committee on Education, Research and Church Affairs.

Bjørnø was a member of Porsgrunn city council from 2003 to 2011. He was elected to Telemark county council in 2011 where he served as deputy mayor.

In the 2013 Norwegian parliamentary election, he was nominated in the third spot on the Telemark Labour ballot. He fought for the ballot position against Labour Youth leader Eskil Pedersen and won with 74 votes against 55 votes for Pedersen at the Telemark Labour Party's nomination meeting in November 2012. Eskildsen had the support of Skien Labour party and Telemark Labour Youth, while Bjørnø was supported by Porsgrunn Labour Party and several other district branches where a major argument in favour of Bjørnø was that he was based in Telemark as opposed to Pedersen who had lived in Oslo for a long time.

In the general election, Labour Party got three representatives from Telemark and Bjørø became representative number 5 from Telemark.

Bjørø is the son of TV2 journalist Signe Tynning and the grandson of Conservative politician Torstein Tynning.
