= Herman Løvenskiold (politician) =

Norwegian politician

Herman Løvenskiold (20 June 1869 – 2 February 1927) was a Norwegian military officer and politician for the Conservative Party. He reached as far as chairing the Parliament's Standing Committee on the Military, but died during an important debate.

== Personal life ==
He was born in Christiania as a son of landowner and jurist Herman Løvenskiold (1822–1910) and Mina Heftye (1831–1899). He was a grandson of Frederik Michael Frantz Wilhelm Løvenskiold and grandnephew of Severin Løvenskiold.

Together with Anette Gjertsen (1871–1940) he had the son Herman L. Løvenskiold, a notable scientist. His daughter Friede married military officer Erik Qvam, and his granddaughter Inger married art historian Peter Anker.

== Career ==
He finished his secondary education in 1887, and became a military officer in 1890. He was an aspirant in the general staff from 1895, adjoint and Captain from 1900, Major from September 1914 and Lieutenant Colonel from 1 January 1918. At the same time, he was promoted from leading a battalion to being second-in-command of Telemarkens Infantry Regiment 3.

He resided in Bamble Municipality, and was a member of the executive committee of the municipal council from 1910 to his death. He also served as mayor from 1919 to 1922. He was elected to the Parliament of Norway in 1921 from the constituency Telemark, and was re-elected in 1924. In his first term he was a member of the Standing Committee on Social Affairs and the Election Committee. In his second term he was the chairman of the Standing Committee on the Military, and a member of the Standing Committee on Foreign and Constitutional Affairs and the Election Committee. On 1 February 1927, while Parliament debated the new organization of the defence forces (Norwegian: Forsvarsordningen av 1927), Løvenskiold got an absence of leave as he had suffered from cerebral haemorrhage. He died on the next day. He was replaced by Torjus Sølverud.

Løvenskiold was admitted into the exclusive skiing-based social club SK Ull in 1887. He served as manager of the club, overlooking its treasury and secretary functions, from 1894 to 1897. He was also a deputy board member of the Norwegian Water Resources and Energy Directorate from 1926 to his death.
