= Astrid Versto =

Norwegian journalist and diplomat

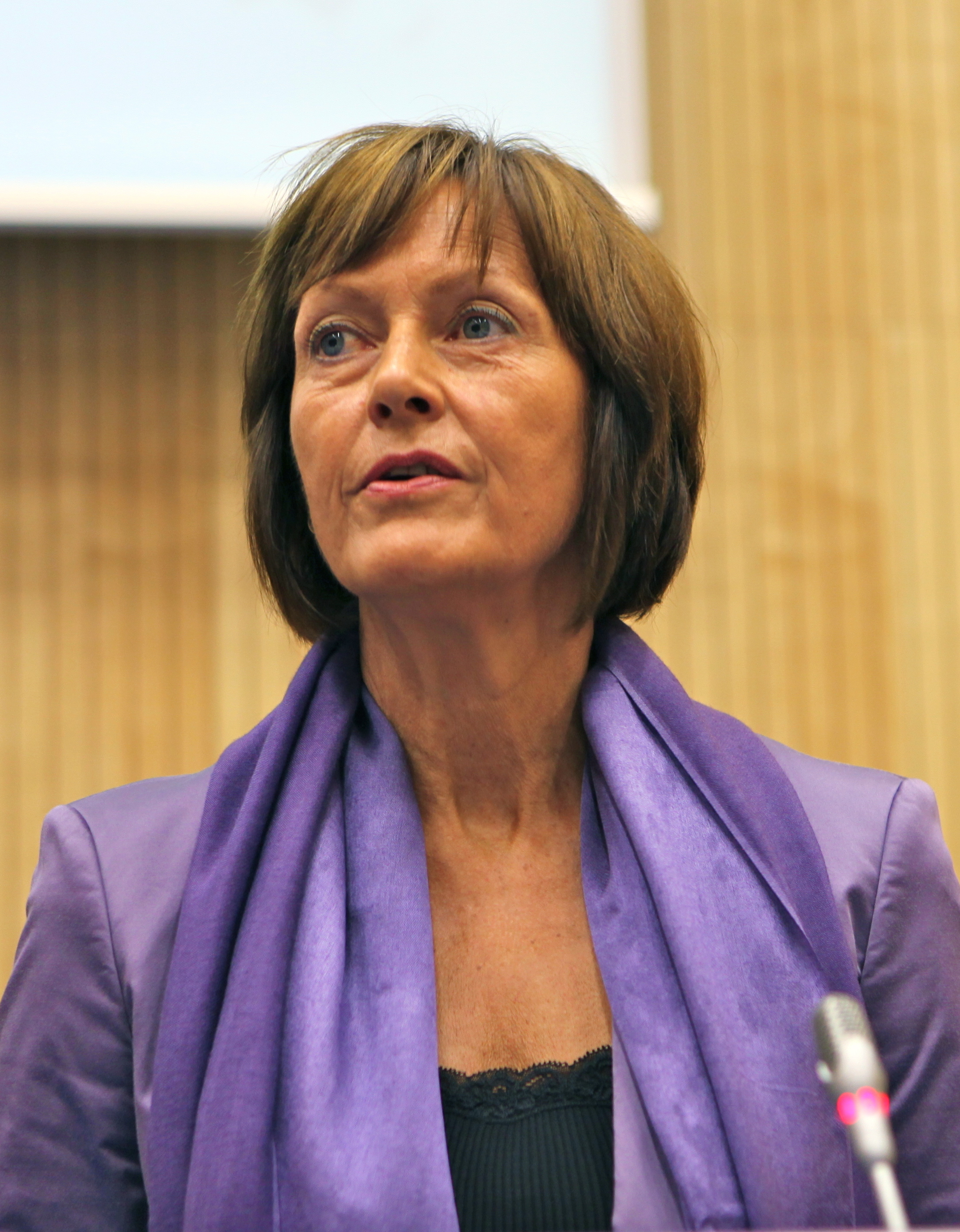
Versto in 2012

Astrid Versto (born 3 August 1953) is a Norwegian journalist and diplomat.

She was born in Vinje Municipality and took her education at the Norwegian Journalist College. After a journalistic career she was hired as director of communications in Norad in 2000, moving on to director of personnel in 2004. From 2005 to 2008 she was the director of communications at the Royal Palace, Oslo, in other words the Norwegian royal couple. She embarked on a diplomatic career as counsellor at the Norwegian embassy in Austria from 2008 to 2012, director of communications in the Norwegian Ministry of Foreign Affairs from 2012 to 2015 and Norwegian ambassador to Croatia from 2015.

She is a daughter of Aslak Versto, sister of Olav Versto and married to Terje Svabø.

Preceded by Wenche Rasch	Director of communications at the Royal Palace, Oslo; 2005–2008	Succeeded by Marianne Hagen
