= Eigil Olaf Liane =

Norwegian politician

Eigil Olaf Liane (7 May 1916 – 17 June 1994) was a Norwegian politician for the Labour Party.

He was born in Tinn Municipality. He was elected to the Norwegian Parliament from Telemark in 1954, and was re-elected on four occasions.

Liane was mayor of Sannidal Municipality from 1945–1947, 1947–1951, and 1951–1955.
