= Turid Dørumsgaard Varsi =

Norwegian politician

Member of the Storting
- In office 1977–1981
- Constituency: Telemark

Personal details
- Born: June 3, 1938 (age 88) Tinn Municipality, Norway
- Party: Labour Party

Turid Dørumsgaard Varsi (born 3 June 1938 in Tinn Municipality) is a Norwegian politician for the Labour Party.

She was elected to the Norwegian Parliament from Telemark in 1977, but was not re-elected in 1981.

On the local level she was a member of the municipal council of Tokke Municipality from 1971 to 1975. She returned as a deputy member of their executive committee from 1995 to 2003.

Outside politics she spent her career in the school system, having settled in Høydalsmo.
