= Olav Aslakson Versto =

Norwegian politician

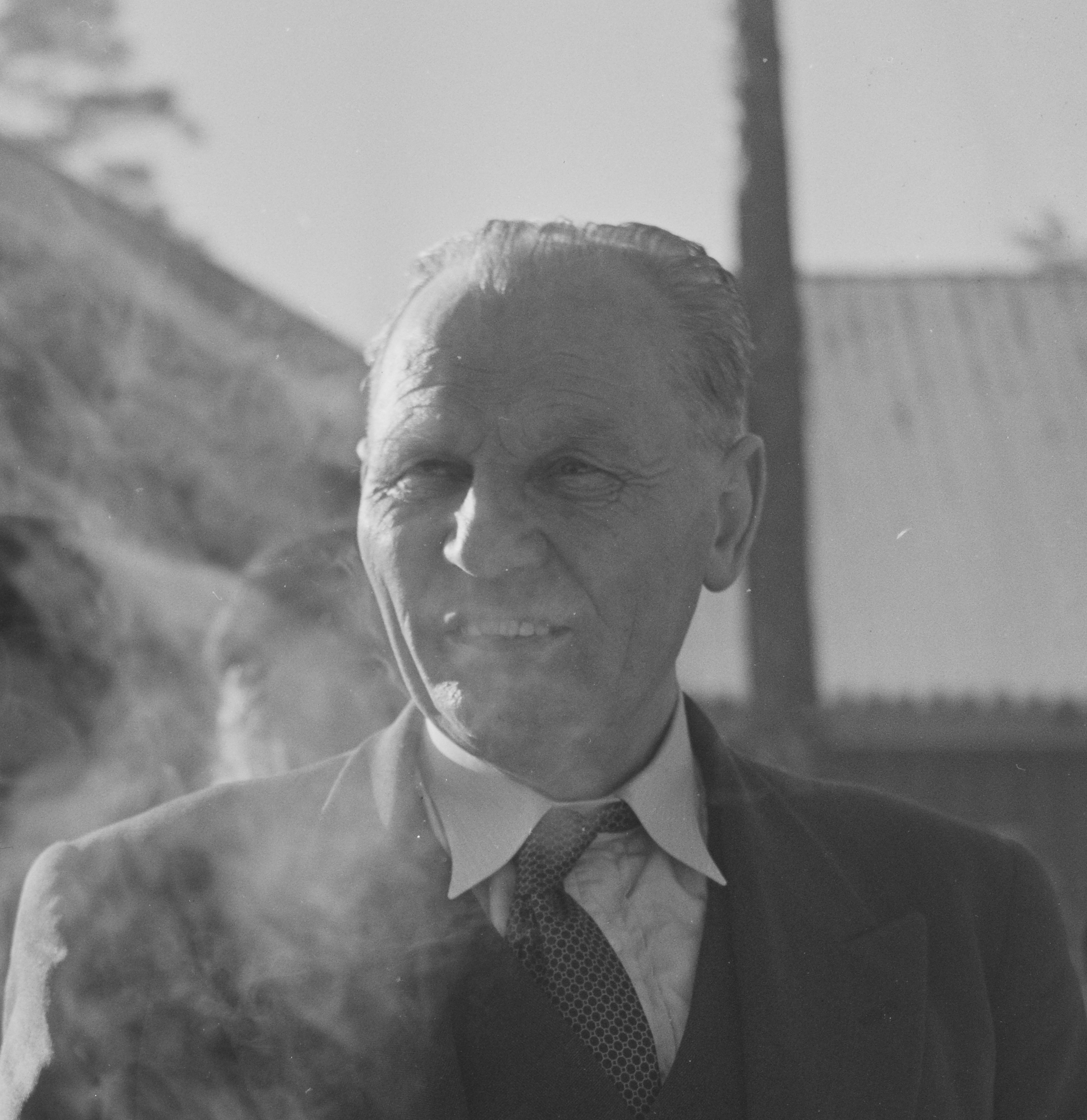
Olav Aslakson Versto in 1955

Olav Aslakson Versto (22 June 1892 – 13 June 1977) was a Norwegian politician for the Labour Party.

He was born in Rauland Municipality. He was elected to the Norwegian Parliament from Telemark in 1928, and was re-elected on eight occasions.

Versto was a member of the executive committee of the municipal council of Vinje Municipality from 1919 to 1931 and 1947 to 1955. Between 1931 and 1937 he served as deputy mayor. He was also a member of Telemark County Council in 1945.

He was the father of Aslak Versto, and the grandfather of Olav Versto and Astrid Versto.
