= Telemark Research Institute =

Norwegian research institute

Coordinates: 59°24′46″N 9°03′32″E

Telemark Research Institute (Norwegian: Telemarksforsking) is a Norwegian government-funded research institute, headquartered in Bø i Telemark. It was founded in 1986 and is one of nine regional research institutes in Norway which are funded by the Research Council of Norway. It is organised as a foundation. Its main focus areas are cultural studies, regional studies, innovation, health and social issues, and entrepreneurship.
