= Sigbjørn Molvik =

Norwegian politician (born 1950)

Sigbjørn Molvik (born 4 September 1950 in Volda Municipality) is a Norwegian politician for the Socialist Left Party.

He was elected to the Norwegian Parliament from Telemark in 2001, but was not re-elected in 2005.

Molvik was a member of the municipal council for Kragerø Municipality during the term 1991–1995.
