= John Alvheim =

Norwegian politician (1930–2005)

Member of the Norwegian Parliament
- In office 1 October 1989 – 30 September 2005
- Constituency: Telemark

Second Deputy Leader of the Progress Party
- In office 29 April 2001 – 22 May 2005
- Leader: Carl I. Hagen
- Preceded by: Terje Søviknes
- Succeeded by: Per Arne Olsen

Personal details
- Born: 21 May 1930 Øygarden, Norway
- Died: 5 December 2005 (aged 75) Notodden, Norway
- Party: Christian Democratic Party (until the 1970s); Progress Party (since the 1980s)
- Occupation: Politician
- Profession: Nurse anesthetist

John Ingolf Alvheim (21 May 1930 – 5 December 2005) was a Norwegian politician for the Progress Party. He was a nurse anesthetist by profession, and served as aid worker in several developing countries during the 1970s. Alvheim was highly respected, also by his political opponents, for his vigorous fight for society's disadvantaged.

== Personal life ==
Alvheim was born in Øygarden Municipality, Hordaland, to fisherman and farmer Joakim Knutsen Alvheim (1893–1958) and housewife Ingeborg Larsen (1895–1972). From 1954 to 1956 he worked in the Norwegian Navy as a Medical Quartermaster, and finished his education as a nurse anesthetist. After working some years in Norway at Askim sykehus, from 1958 to 1961 he worked as head nurse at the United Nations Interim Force in Lebanon, and later returned to work in Norway at Notodden sykehus. After that he did several missions as an aid worker, for the Norwegian Church Aid in Bangladesh in 1972 and Ethiopia in 1974, and for the Red Cross in Lebanon in 1976.

He also devoted much of his life to help less fortunate children in developing countries, building an orphanage for children in Bangladesh in 1979. He was married in 1980 to nurse Aune-Liisa Kankaanpää (born 29 December 1944).

Alvheim co-authored the autobiography Fra småting til Storting with Maj-Lis Stordal in 1990.

== Political career ==
Alvheim started his political career for the Christian Democratic Party. He was elected to a local office in Notodden Municipality for the party in 1967 and was a deputy Member of Parliament for the party from 1973 to 1977. During the 1980s he however changed to the Progress Party, and in 1989 was elected into the Norwegian parliament from Telemark. He was a member of the Health Committee from 1989 to 2005, the last eight years as its leader.

=== Memoria ===
To his honor, the "Honorary Award of John I. Alvheim" (John I. Alvheim ærespris) has since 2005 been awarded annually by the Progress Party to someone who has made a special effort for the weak in society. Alvheim was present to give the first award himself at the Progress Party national convention on 21 May 2005, but died in December later the same year of a heart attack after many years being a smoker.

Award recipients have been:

- 2005 – Slumsøster Marit Solli in the Salvation Army, for his efforts for the poor
- 2006 – Ola Ødegaard in the Foundation of Justice for Taperne
- 2007 – Private Investigator Tore Sandberg
- 2008 – Kai Zahl, founder of Dissimilis
- 2009 – Lise Karlsen, Evangeliesenteret
- 2010 – Stine Sofies Foundation
- 2011 – Lifestyle for the elderly
- 2012 – Grete Kvalheim
- 2013 – LEVE – National Association for Suicidal Suffering
- 2014 – Shirley Bottolfsen
- 2015 – Stiftelsen Retretten
