= Gunn Olsen =

Norwegian politician

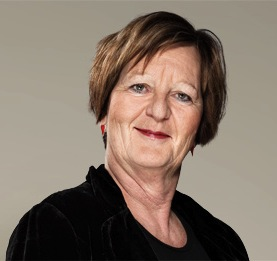
Gunn Olsen

Gunn Olsen (18 September 1952 – 27 December 2013) was a Norwegian politician for the Labour Party.

== Background ==
Olsen was born in Kragerø, the daughter of a mechanic and a housewife. She went to commerce school in 1969 but chose not to attend a higher education institution. Instead she was an office clerk in the newspaper Telemark Arbeiderblad from 1969 to 1990.

== Political career ==
She was a member of Telemark county council from 1983 to 1999, serving as deputy county mayor from 1990 to 1995. She has chaired the county party chapter, and been a member of the Labour Party national board. She was a deputy member of the municipal council of Kragerø Municipality from 1979 to 1983.

She served as a deputy representative to the Norwegian Parliament from Telemark during the terms 1985–1989 and 1989–1993. She was elected as a full representative in 1997, and was re-elected in 2001, 2005 and 2009. She sat on a different Standing Committee during each of her four parliamentary terms.

== Death ==
Olsen did not stand for re-election in 2013 because she had been diagnosed with cancer. She died from this disease in December 2013 at Marienlyst in Kragerø.
