= Aslak Versto =

Norwegian politician

Aslak Versto (born 20 December 1924 in Vinje, died 25 November 1992) was a Norwegian politician for the Labour Party.

He was the son of former MP Olav Aslakson Versto. Aslak Versto was elected to the Norwegian Parliament from Telemark in 1969, and was re-elected on one occasion. He had previously served as a deputy representative during the terms 1961–1965 and 1965–1969.

On the local level he was a member of the executive committee of the municipal council of Vinje Municipality from 1947 to 1951. He later served as mayor from 1959 to 1971 and 1979 to 1987. He was also a member of the Telemark County Council. He chaired the municipal party chapter from 1952 to 1957 and the county party chapter from 1968 to 1969.

Outside politics he worked as a farmer. He was the father of Olav Versto and Astrid Versto.
