= Margit Schiøtt =

Norwegian politician

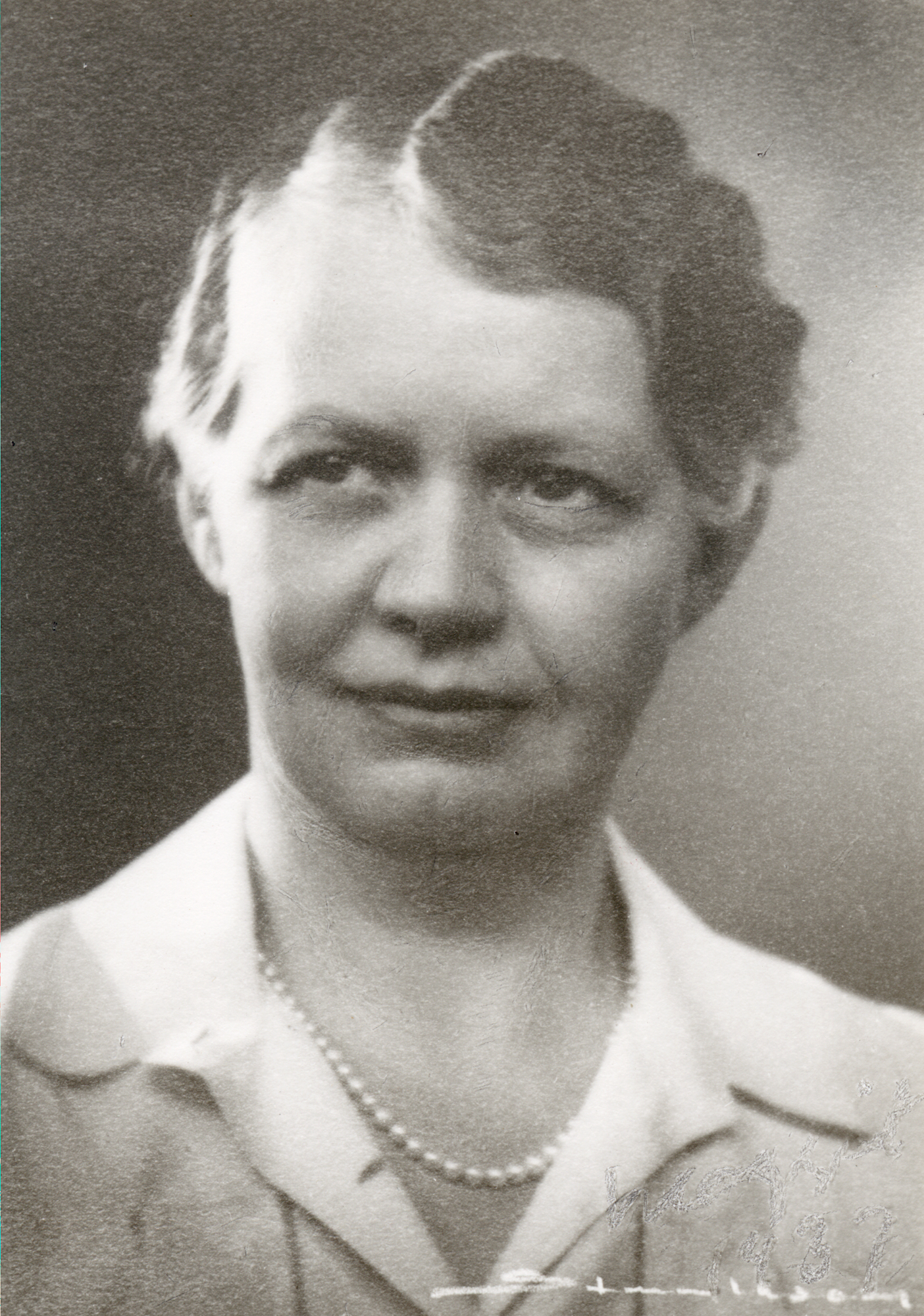
Image of Margit Schiøtt

Margit Schiøtt, née Knudsen (2 May 1889 – 16 September 1946) was a Norwegian politician for the Liberal Party. She was born in Gjerpen Municipality, a daughter of the Norwegian Prime Minister Gunnar Knudsen. Her husband was dr. ing. Didrik Cappelen Schiøtt (1887–1958) and they lived at Gulset in Skien Municipality, Norway, where they also owned a little farm. They had no children.

She was elected to the Norwegian Parliament from Telemark in 1945, but less than one year into the term she died and was replaced by Ketil Skogen. She had previously served in the position of deputy representative during the term 1937–1945.

Schiøtt held various positions in the municipal council of Gjerpen Municipality between 1934 and 1940.
