= Neri Valen =

Norwegian politician (1893–1954)

Neri Valen (26 September 1893 – 4 January 1954) was a Norwegian politician for the Liberal Party.

He was born in Bø Municipality. He was elected to the Norwegian Parliament from Telemark in 1931, and was re-elected on four occasions. Shortly into his fifth term, he died and was replaced by Ketil Skogen.

Valen became a member of the municipal council in Bø Municipality in 1919, and became mayor in 1922. From 1925 to 1931 he served as deputy mayor.

During the occupation of Norway by Nazi Germany he was imprisoned in Grini concentration camp from 24 November 1943, then in Berg concentration camp from 20 March 1944 to the occupation's end in May 1945.
