= Sigvald Oppebøen Hansen =

Norwegian politician

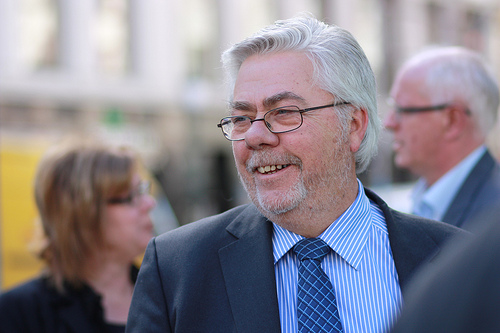
Sigvald Oppebøen Hansen

Sigvald Oppebøen Hansen (born 21 September 1950 in Nissedal) is a Norwegian politician for the Labour Party.

He was elected to the Norwegian Parliament from Telemark in 1993, and has been re-elected on three occasions.

On the local level was a member of municipal council of Nissedal Municipality from 1983 to 1987, and of Telemark County Council from 1983 to 1993.

Before entering politics, he worked as a mail carrier and has attended a business school.
