= Bror Yngve Rahm =

Norwegian politician (born 1955)

Bror Yngve Rahm (born 4 January 1955 in Porsgrunn) is a Norwegian politician for the Christian Democratic Party.

He was elected to the Norwegian Parliament from Telemark in 1997, and was re-elected on one occasion.

Rahm was a member of Telemark county council during the term 1995–1999.
