= Bent Hegna =

Norwegian politician (born 1959)

Bent Hegna (born 10 June 1959 in Oslo) is a Norwegian politician for the Labour Party.

He was elected to the Norwegian Parliament from Telemark in 1993, and was re-elected on one occasion.

On the local level Hegna was a member of Porsgrunn city council from 1991 to 1993.
