= Telemark Hospital Trust =

Health trust in Norway

Coordinates: 59.1911°N 9.5931°E

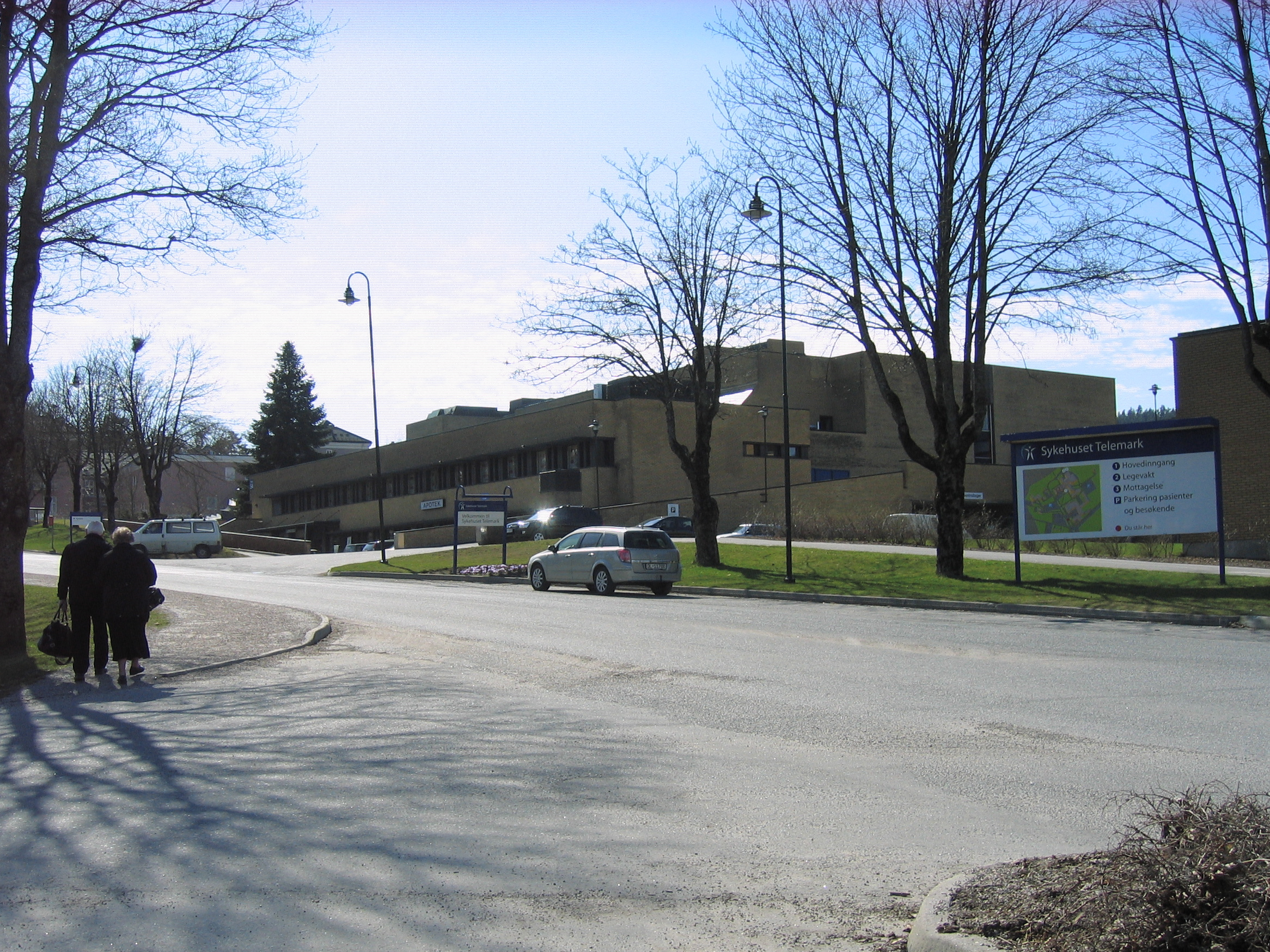
The road leading up to the headquarters, Telemark Hospital in Skien.

Telemark Hospital Trust is a health trust with its headquarters in Skien. There are also sections in Porsgrunn and Kragerø. The total employees in 2003 were 2750, of which 215 were doctors. It is owned by Southern and Eastern Norway Regional Health Authority.
