= Kari Lise Holmberg =

Norwegian politician (born 1951)

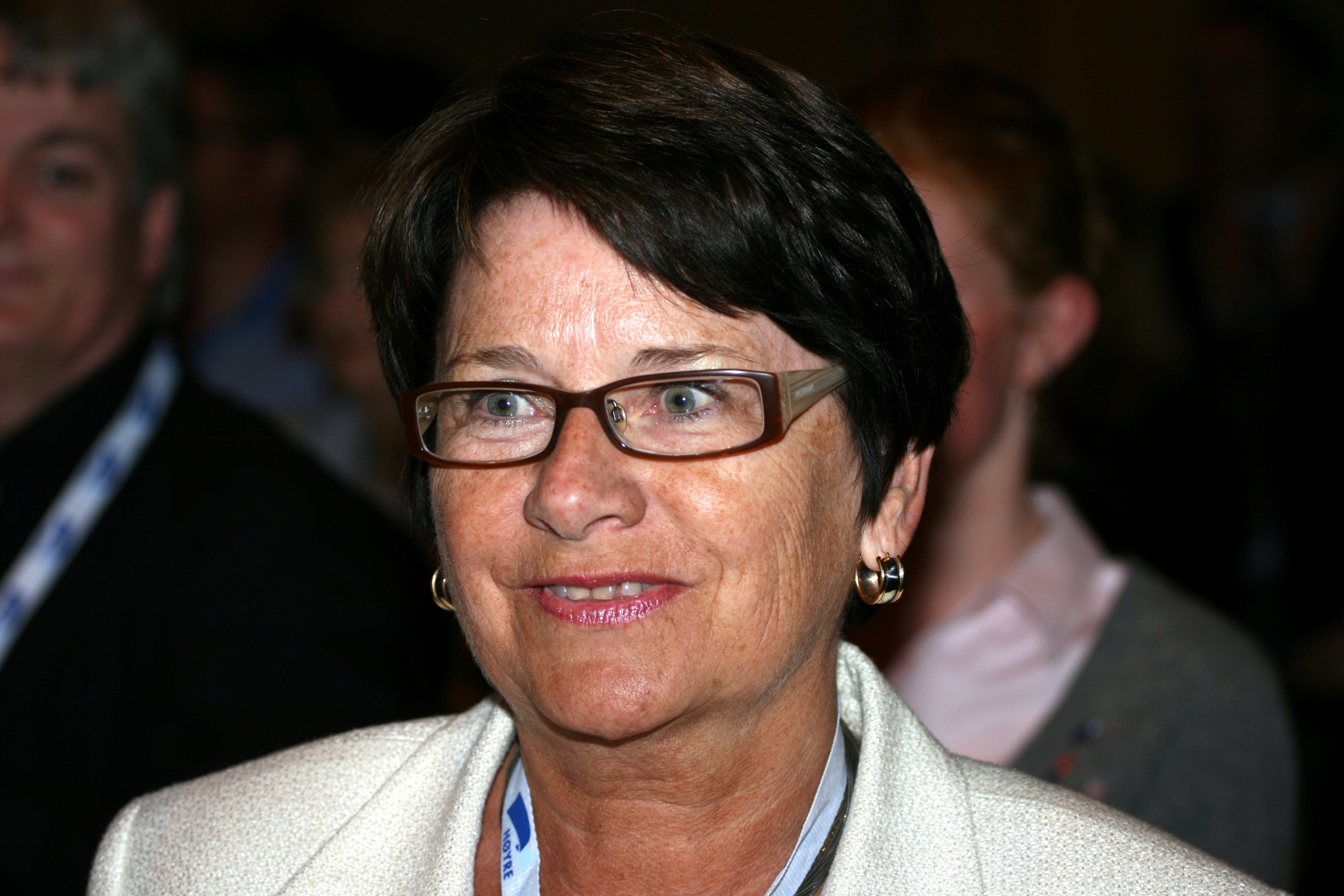
Kari Lise Holmberg (2009)

Kari Lise Holmberg (born 7 September 1951 in Skien) is a Norwegian politician for the Conservative Party.

She was elected to the Norwegian Parliament from Telemark in 2001, and has been re-elected on one occasion. She had previously served as a deputy representative during the term 1997–2001. As the only representative of her party she is a member of Israels Venner på Stortinget.

On the local level Holmberg was a member of Skien municipality council from 1987 to 2001, serving as mayor in 1999–2001.

Outside politics she worked as a school teacher and rector.
