= Olav Versto =

Norwegian journalist (1950–2011)

- Born: 31 July 1950; Vinje Municipality, Telemark
- Died: 7 July 2011 (aged 60); Farsund Municipality, Vest-Agder
- Occupations: Journalist, editor

Olav Versto (31 July 1950 – 7 July 2011) was a Norwegian journalist and editor, primarily known for his work for the newspaper Verdens Gang.

== Education and career ==
Versto received a cand.mag. degree from the University of Oslo in 1976. He started his career in the Norwegian Broadcasting Corporation in 1977, and was hired as a subeditor of Verdens Gang, Norway's largest newspaper, in 1987. From 1994 to 2008 he was the political editor of Verdens Gang. After that he became the editor of the op-ed section of the newspaper.

Olav Versto hailed from Vinje Municipality, and was the grandson of Olav Aslakson Versto and son of Aslak Versto, both politicians. He was himself politically involved, and was a forceful activist for the failed campaign for Norwegian European Union membership in 1994. In his later years, Versto was involved in the debate over the conflict between Islam and the West. In 2003, he went far towards supporting the US-led invasion of Iraq, a controversial stance in Norway at the time.

Versto was married to Kari Storsletten, journalist in the newspaper Aftenposten. The two were in 2007 ranked as number four among the most powerful media couples in Norway, by the online business newspaper NA24.

== Death ==
Versto was found dead in the harbour of Farsund on 7 July 2011. Police believe he may have slipped on the rain-soaked floor of his boat and fell into the water.

Following his death, Versto was praised by several prominent figures, including Prime Minister Jens Stoltenberg, former Prime Ministers Gro Harlem Brundtland, Kjell Magne Bondevik, Kåre Willoch and World War II veteran Gunnar Sønsteby.

== Publications ==
- Årsakene til flyttinga av bygdesenteret, og framvoksterenav "Bø-gata". with Truls Frogner and Halvor Kleppen. Bø: Telemark District College. 1972.
- Dobbelt-agenten. with Harald Henden and Erik H. Sønstelie. Oslo: Norwegian Foundation for Investigative Journalism. 1998.
