= Herman L. Løvenskiold =

Norwegian writer

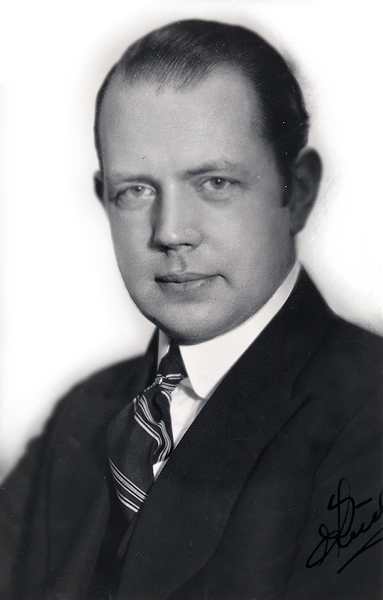
Herman L. Løvenskiold, c. 1933

Herman Leopoldus Løvenskiold (4 February 1897 at Rafnes – 16 July 1982 at Nesodden), often known as Herman L. Løvenskiold, was a Norwegian ornithologist, photographer, government scholar and author on heraldry.

He obtained a doctorate in chemistry in Germany, but his main interest was the life of birds; hence he was known as Fugle-Herman within the family. In 1964, he obtained a Norwegian doctorate in ornithology with the dissertation Avifauna Svalbardensis. He wrote books on ornithology and environmental protection, and was the photographer in Carl Schøyen's book Fuglefjell (1931).

Løvenskiold was also interested in genealogy and heraldry. He authored the book Heraldisk nøkkel and was the first chairman of the Norwegian Heraldic Society. He also wrote a book about his own family, the Løvenskiold family.
