= List of members of the Storting, 1961–1965 =

List of all members of the Storting in the period 1961 to 1965. The list includes all those initially elected to Storting.

There were a total of 150 representatives, distributed among the parties: 74 to the Norwegian Labour Party, 29 to the Conservative Party of Norway, 16 to the Centre Party, 15 to the Christian Democratic Party, 14 to Venstre and 2 to the Socialist People's Party (currently named Socialist Left Party).

== Aust-Agder ==
Name	Party	Comments/Suppleant representatives
Magnhild Hagelia	Norwegian Labour Party	
Bjarne Henry Henriksen	Norwegian Labour Party	
Berge Helle Kringlebotn	Venstre (Norway)	Elected on joint list of Centre Party/Venstre
Alfred Thommesen	Conservative Party of Norway	

== Vest-Agder ==
=== Before revote ===
Name	Party	Comments/Suppleant representatives
Bent Røiseland	Venstre (Norway)	Elected on joint list with Centre Party/Venstre
Jens Haugland	Norwegian Labour Party	
Olai Ingemar Eikeland	Centre Party (Norway)	Elected on joint list of Centre Party/Venstre
Ole Jørgensen	Norwegian Labour Party	
Haakon Sløgedal	Christian Democratic Party of Norway	

=== After revote ===
As of March 2, 1962

Name	Party	Comments/Suppleant representatives
Jens Haugland	Norwegian Labour Party	
Bent Røiseland	Venstre (Norway)	Elected on joint list with Centre Party/Venstre
Ole Jørgensen	Norwegian Labour Party	
Haakon Sløgedal	Christian Democratic Party of Norway	
Olai Ingemar Eikeland	Centre Party (Norway)	Elected on joint list of Centre Party/Venstre

== Akershus ==
Name	Party	Comments/Suppleant representatives
Halvard Lange	Norwegian Labour Party	
John Lyng	Conservative Party of Norway	Appointed to Cabinet from August to September 1963, during which time he was replaced by Ebba Haslund.
Hartvig Svendsen	Norwegian Labour Party	
Liv Tomter	Norwegian Labour Party	
Kristian Asdahl	Conservative Party of Norway	
Hans Borgen	Centre Party (Norway)	Appointed to Cabinet from August to September 1963, during which time he was replaced by Hans Christian Brevig.
Thor Fossum	Norwegian Labour Party	

== Bergen ==
Name	Party	Comments/Suppleant representatives
Nils Langhelle	Norwegian Labour Party	
Edvard Isak Hambro	Conservative Party of Norway	Elected on joint list of Conservative Party/Christian Democratic Party
Torstein Selvik	Norwegian Labour Party	
Gunnar Garbo	Venstre (Norway)	
Oliver Dahl-Goli	Christian Democratic Party of Norway	Elected on joint list of Conservative Party/Christian Democratic Party

== Buskerud ==
Name	Party	Comments/Suppleant representatives
Olaf Fredrik Watnebryn	Norwegian Labour Party	
Ragnar Karl Viktor Christiansen	Norwegian Labour Party	
Bernt Ingvaldsen	Conservative Party of Norway	
Guri Johannessen	Norwegian Labour Party	
Gunnar Mykstu	Norwegian Labour Party	
Botolv Bråtalien	Centre Party (Norway)	
Olaf Knudson	Conservative Party of Norway	

== Finnmark ==
Name	Party	Comments/Suppleant representatives
Johannes Olai Olsen	Norwegian Labour Party	
Harry Johan Olai Klippenvåg	Norwegian Labour Party	
Erling Norvik	Conservative Party of Norway	
Harald Nicolai Samuelsberg	Norwegian Labour Party	

== Hedmark ==
Name	Party	Comments/Suppleant representatives
Harald Johan Løbak	Norwegian Labour Party	
Reidar Magnus Aamo	Norwegian Labour Party	
Ole Rømer Aagaard Sandberg	Centre Party (Norway)	
Otto Dahl	Norwegian Labour Party	
Haldis Tjernsberg	Norwegian Labour Party	
Alv Kjøs	Conservative Party of Norway	
Odvar Nordli	Norwegian Labour Party	
Karen Grønn-Hagen	Centre Party (Norway)	Appointed to Cabinet from August to September 1963, during which time she was replaced by Karstein Seland.

== Hordaland ==
Name	Party	Comments/Suppleant representatives
Jakob Martin Pettersen	Norwegian Labour Party	
Torstein Kvamme	Christian Democratic Party of Norway	
Knut Ytre-Arne	Venstre (Norway)	
Isak Larsson Flatabø	Norwegian Labour Party	
Chr. L. Holm	Conservative Party of Norway	
Lars Leiro	Centre Party (Norway)	Appointed to Cabinet from August to September 1963, during which time he was replaced by Eilif Åsbo.
Hjalmar Olai Storeide	Norwegian Labour Party	Died in November 1961. Was replaced by Steffen Ingebriktsen Toppe.
Lars Amandus Aasgard	Christian Democratic Party of Norway	
Olav Hordvik	Venstre (Norway)	
Margit Tøsdal	Norwegian Labour Party	

== Møre and Romsdal ==
Name	Party	Comments/Suppleant representatives
Anders Sæterøy	Norwegian Labour Party	
Einar Hareide	Christian Democratic Party of Norway	
Peter Kjeldseth Moe	Norwegian Labour Party	
Kristian Langlo	Venstre (Norway)	
Olav Rasmussen Langeland	Centre Party (Norway)	
Knut Toven	Christian Democratic Party of Norway	
Ivar Kornelius Eikrem	Norwegian Labour Party	
Sverre Bernhard Nybø	Conservative Party of Norway	
Sivert Todal	Venstre (Norway)	
Claus Marius Neergaard	Norwegian Labour Party	

== Nordland ==
Name	Party	Comments/Suppleant representatives
Kolbjørn Sigurd Verner Varmann	Norwegian Labour Party	
Parelius Hjalmar Bang Berntsen	Norwegian Labour Party	
Håkon Kyllingmark	Conservative Party of Norway	Appointed to Cabinet from August to September 1963, during which time he was replaced by Moy Herborg Regina Nordahl.
Sigurd Lund Hamran	Norwegian Labour Party	
Hans Berg	Christian Democratic Party of Norway	
Erling Engan	Centre Party (Norway)	
Jonas Enge	Norwegian Labour Party	
Peter Ovald Reinsnes	Norwegian Labour Party	
Asbjørn Antoni Holm	Socialist People's Party	
Harald Warholm	Conservative Party of Norway	
Margith Johanne Munkebye	Norwegian Labour Party	
Edmund Fjærvoll	Christian Democratic Party of Norway	

== Oppland ==
Name	Party	Comments/Suppleant representatives
Oskar Skogly	Norwegian Labour Party	
Gunnar Kalrasten	Norwegian Labour Party	Died in May 1964. Was replaced by Per Mellesmo.
Einar Hovdhaugen	Centre Party (Norway)	Elected on joint list of Centre Party/Venstre/Radikale Folkepartiet
Thorstein Treholt	Norwegian Labour Party	
Trond Halvorsen Wirstad	Centre Party (Norway)	Elected on joint list of Centre Party/Venstre/Radikale Folkepartiet
Torger Hovi	Norwegian Labour Party	
Guttorm Granum	Conservative Party of Norway	Died in September 1963. Was replaced by Trygve Owren.

== Oslo ==
Name	Party	Comments/Suppleant representatives
Einar Gerhardsen	Norwegian Labour Party	
Kåre Willoch	Conservative Party of Norway	Appointed to Cabinet from August to September 1963, during which time he was replaced by Ivar Moe.
Konrad Mathias Nordahl	Norwegian Labour Party	
Berte Rognerud	Conservative Party of Norway	
Rakel Seweriin	Norwegian Labour Party	
Erling Petersen	Conservative Party of Norway	
Finn Moe	Norwegian Labour Party	
Reidar Bruu	Conservative Party of Norway	
Trygve Bratteli	Norwegian Labour Party	
Finn Gustavsen	Socialist People's Party	
Per Lønning	Conservative Party of Norway	
Aase Lionæs	Norwegian Labour Party	
Egil Aarvik	Christian Democratic Party of Norway	

== Rogaland ==
Name	Party	Comments/Suppleant representatives
Trond Hegna	Norwegian Labour Party	
Ole Bergesen	Conservative Party of Norway	Died in January 1965. Was replaced by Peter Torleivson Molaug.
Lars Ramndal	Venstre (Norway)	
Jakob Martinus Remseth	Norwegian Labour Party	
Kjell Bondevik	Christian Democratic Party of Norway	Appointed to Cabinet from August to September 1963, during which time he was replaced by Knut Haus.
Bjarne Undheim	Centre Party (Norway)	
Sunniva Hakestad Møller	Norwegian Labour Party	
Gunnar Fredrik Hellesen	Conservative Party of Norway	
Ingolv Helland	Venstre (Norway)	
Karl J. Brommeland	Christian Democratic Party of Norway	

== Sogn and Fjordane ==
Name	Party	Comments/Suppleant representatives
Einar Magnus Stavang	Norwegian Labour Party	
John Austrheim	Centre Party (Norway)	
Hans Offerdal	Norwegian Labour Party	
Ludvig Olai Botnen	Venstre (Norway)	Vararepresentant Johnny Bakke
Hans Karolus Ommedal	Christian Democratic Party of Norway	

== Telemark ==
Name	Party	Comments/Suppleant representatives
Sverre Offenberg Løberg	Norwegian Labour Party	
Harald Selås	Norwegian Labour Party	
Eigil Olaf Liane	Norwegian Labour Party	
Torkell Tande	Venstre (Norway)	
Sveinung O. Flaaten	Conservative Party of Norway	Died in June 1962. Was replaced by Didrik Cappelen.
Jørgen Grave	Christian Democratic Party of Norway	

== Troms ==
Name	Party	Comments/Suppleant representatives
Nils Kristen Jacobsen	Norwegian Labour Party	
Einar Wøhni	Norwegian Labour Party	
Frithjov Meier Vik	Conservative Party of Norway	
Kåre Martin Hansen	Norwegian Labour Party	
Helge Jakobsen	Venstre (Norway)	
Alfred Meyer Henningsen	Norwegian Labour Party	

== Nord-Trøndelag ==
Name	Party	Comments/Suppleant representatives
Gunvald Engelstad	Norwegian Labour Party	
Jon Leirfall	Centre Party (Norway)	
Leif Granli	Norwegian Labour Party	
Guttorm Hansen	Norwegian Labour Party	
Inge Einarsen Bartnes	Centre Party (Norway)	
Bjarne Lyngstad	Venstre (Norway)	Appointed to Cabinet from August to September 1963, during which time he was replaced by Ola H. Kveli.

== Sør-Trøndelag ==
Name	Party	Comments/Suppleant representatives
Nils Kristian Lysø	Norwegian Labour Party	
Håkon Johnsen	Norwegian Labour Party	
Otto Lyng	Conservative Party of Norway	
Per Borten	Centre Party (Norway)	Elected on joint list of Centre Party/Venstre
Johan Sigurd Karlsen	Norwegian Labour Party	
Iver Johan Unsgård	Norwegian Labour Party	
Kristoffer Rein	Christian Democratic Party of Norway	
Martin Skaaren	Conservative Party of Norway	
Andreas Wormdahl	Norwegian Labour Party	
Oddmund Hoel	Venstre (Norway)	Elected on joint list of Centre Party/Venstre

== Vestfold ==
Name	Party	Comments/Suppleant representatives
Asbjørn Lillås	Norwegian Labour Party	
Johan Møller Warmedal	Conservative Party of Norway	
Reidar Strømdahl	Norwegian Labour Party	
Bjarne Støtvig	Conservative Party of Norway	
Johan Andersen	Norwegian Labour Party	
Gunvor Katharina Eker	Norwegian Labour Party	
Rolf Schjerven	Conservative Party of Norway	

== Østfold ==
Name	Party	Comments/Suppleant representatives
Nils Hønsvald	Norwegian Labour Party	
Ingvar Bakken	Norwegian Labour Party	
Svenn Thorkild Stray	Conservative Party of Norway	
Henry Jacobsen	Norwegian Labour Party	Died in 1964. Was replaced by Arvid Johanson.
Lars Korvald	Christian Democratic Party of Norway	
Martha Frederikke Johannessen	Norwegian Labour Party	
Erik Braadland	Centre Party (Norway)	Elected on joint list of Centre Party/Venstre
Erling Fredriksfryd	Conservative Party of Norway	
