= List of members of the Storting, 1965–1969 =

List of all members of the Storting in the period 1965 to 1969. The list includes all those initially elected to the Storting.

There were a total of 150 representatives, distributed among the parties: 68 to Norwegian Labour Party, 31 to Conservative Party of Norway, 18 to Centre Party (Norway), 18 to Venstre (Norway), 13 to Christian Democratic Party of Norway and 2 to Socialist Left Party.

== Aust-Agder ==
Name	Party	Comments/Suppleant representatives
Bjarne Henry Henriksen	Norwegian Labour Party	
Osmund Faremo	Norwegian Labour Party	
Alfred Thommesen	Conservative Party of Norway	
Øyvind Bjorvatn	Venstre (Norway)	

== Vest-Agder ==
Name	Party	Comments/Suppleant representatives
Jens Haugland	Norwegian Labour Party	
Bent Røiseland	Venstre (Norway)	
Sverre Walter Rostoft	Conservative Party of Norway	Appointed to Cabinet. Was replaced by Kolbjørn Stordrange.
Salve Andreas Salvesen	Norwegian Labour Party	
Haakon Sløgedal	Christian Democratic Party of Norway	

== Akershus ==
Name	Party	Comments/Suppleant representatives
Halvard Lange	Norwegian Labour Party	
Kristian Asdahl	Conservative Party of Norway	
Thor Fossum	Norwegian Labour Party	
Sonja Aase Ludvigsen	Norwegian Labour Party	
Jo Benkow	Conservative Party of Norway	
Halfdan Hegtun	Venstre (Norway)	
Hans Borgen	Centre Party (Norway)	

== Bergen ==
Name	Party	Comments/Suppleant representatives
Nils Langhelle	Norwegian Labour Party	Died in August 1967. Was replaced by Olav Totland.
Edvard Isak Hambro	Conservative Party of Norway	Elected on a joint list Conservative Party/Christian Democratic Party. Appointed as a diplomat in 1966. Was replaced by Agnes Bakkevig, then Henrik J. Lisæth.
Torstein Selvik	Norwegian Labour Party	
Gunnar Garbo	Venstre (Norway)	
Nikolai Paul Kornelius Molvik	Christian Democratic Party of Norway	Elected on a joint list Conservative Party/Christian Democratic Party

== Buskerud ==
Name	Party	Comments/Suppleant representatives
Ragnar Karl Viktor Christiansen	Norwegian Labour Party	
Reidar Strømdahl	Norwegian Labour Party	
Bernt Ingvaldsen	Conservative Party of Norway	
Guri Johannessen	Norwegian Labour Party	
Erland Steenberg	Centre Party (Norway)	
Sverre Oddvar Andresen	Norwegian Labour Party	
Olaf Knudson	Conservative Party of Norway	

== Finnmark ==
Name	Party	Comments/Suppleant representatives
Valter Gabrielsen	Norwegian Labour Party	
Harald Nicolai Samuelsberg	Norwegian Labour Party	
Erling Norvik	Conservative Party of Norway	
Harry Johan Olai Klippenvåg	Norwegian Labour Party	

== Hedmark ==
Name	Party	Comments/Suppleant representatives
Harald Johan Løbak	Norwegian Labour Party	
Otto Dahl	Norwegian Labour Party	
Karstein Seland	Centre Party (Norway)	
Haldis Tjernsberg	Norwegian Labour Party	
Odvar Nordli	Norwegian Labour Party	
Lars T. Platou	Conservative Party of Norway	
Johan Østby	Centre Party (Norway)	
Lars Holen	Norwegian Labour Party	

== Hordaland ==
Name	Party	Comments/Suppleant representatives
Steffen Ingebriktsen Toppe	Norwegian Labour Party	
Kjeld Langeland	Conservative Party of Norway	
Olav Hordvik	Venstre (Norway)	
Arne Nilsen	Norwegian Labour Party	
Lars Amandus Aasgard	Christian Democratic Party of Norway	
Lars Leiro	Centre Party (Norway)	
Ingvald Johan Ulveseth	Norwegian Labour Party	
Kaare Meland	Conservative Party of Norway	
Thor Myklebust	Venstre (Norway)	
Sverre L. Mo	Christian Democratic Party of Norway	

== Møre and Romsdal ==
Name	Party	Comments/Suppleant representatives
Anders Sæterøy	Norwegian Labour Party	
Olav Rasmussen Langeland	Centre Party (Norway)	
Knut Toven	Christian Democratic Party of Norway	
Bjarne Flem	Venstre (Norway)	
Peter Kjeldseth Moe	Norwegian Labour Party	
Sverre Bernhard Nybø	Conservative Party of Norway	
Kåre Stokkeland	Norwegian Labour Party	
Arnt Gudleik Hagen	Centre Party (Norway)	
Ola Johan Gjengedal	Christian Democratic Party of Norway	
Hans Hammond Rossbach	Venstre (Norway)	

== Nordland ==
Name	Party	Comments/Suppleant representatives
Magnus Andersen	Norwegian Labour Party	Briefly appointed to the Cabinet in early October 1965, before Per Borten formed his first cabinet. During this short period he was replaced by Ola Teigen.
Margith Johanne Munkebye	Norwegian Labour Party	
Håkon Kyllingmark	Conservative Party of Norway	Appointed to Cabinet. Was replaced by Bodil Aakre and later, when Aakre replaced the deceased Harald Warholm instead, Leif Kolflaath.
Per Karstensen	Norwegian Labour Party	
Erling Engan	Centre Party (Norway)	
Rolf Hellem	Norwegian Labour Party	
Hans Berg	Christian Democratic Party of Norway	
Asbjørn Antoni Holm	Socialist Left Party	
Halvor Bjellaanes	Venstre (Norway)	
Harald Warholm	Conservative Party of Norway	Died in February 1967. Was replaced by Bodil Aakre.
Jonas Enge	Norwegian Labour Party	
Sigurd Lund Hamran	Norwegian Labour Party	

== Oppland ==
Name	Party	Comments/Suppleant representatives
Oskar Skogly	Norwegian Labour Party	
Thorstein Treholt	Norwegian Labour Party	
Einar Hovdhaugen	Centre Party (Norway)	
Per Mellesmo	Norwegian Labour Party	
Trygve Owren	Conservative Party of Norway	
Torger Hovi	Norwegian Labour Party	
Trond Halvorsen Wirstad	Centre Party (Norway)	

== Oslo ==
Name	Party	Comments/Suppleant representatives
Einar Gerhardsen	Norwegian Labour Party	
Kåre Willoch	Conservative Party of Norway	Appointed to Cabinet. Was replaced by Astri Rynning.
Trygve Bratteli	Norwegian Labour Party	
Berte Rognerud	Conservative Party of Norway	
Rakel Seweriin	Norwegian Labour Party	
Erling Petersen	Conservative Party of Norway	
Finn Moe	Norwegian Labour Party	
Finn Rudolf Gustavsen	Socialist Left Party	
Reidar Bruu	Conservative Party of Norway	
Helge Seip	Venstre (Norway)	
Gunnar Alf Larsen	Norwegian Labour Party	
Paul Thyness	Conservative Party of Norway	
Aase Lionæs	Norwegian Labour Party	

== Rogaland ==
Name	Party	Comments/Suppleant representatives
Peder P. Næsheim	Norwegian Labour Party	
Gunnar Fredrik Hellesen	Conservative Party of Norway	
Inga Lovise Tusvik	Venstre (Norway)	
Jakob Aano	Christian Democratic Party of Norway	
Sunniva Hakestad Møller	Norwegian Labour Party	
Bjarne Undheim	Centre Party (Norway)	
Edvard Magnus Edvardsen	Norwegian Labour Party	
Egil Endresen	Conservative Party of Norway	
Ingolv Helland	Venstre (Norway)	
Karl J. Brommeland	Christian Democratic Party of Norway	

== Sogn and Fjordane ==
Name	Party	Comments/Suppleant representatives
Einar Magnus Stavang	Norwegian Labour Party	
John Austrheim	Centre Party (Norway)	
Ludvig Olai Botnen	Venstre (Norway)	Vararepresentant Johnny Bakke
Paul Svarstad	Conservative Party of Norway	
Knut Myrstad	Christian Democratic Party of Norway	

== Telemark ==
Name	Party	Comments/Suppleant representatives
Sverre Offenberg Løberg	Norwegian Labour Party	
Harald Selås	Norwegian Labour Party	
Johannes Østtveit	Christian Democratic Party of Norway	
Eigil Olaf Liane	Norwegian Labour Party	
Torstein Tynning	Conservative Party of Norway	
Torkell Tande	Venstre (Norway)	

== Troms ==
Name	Party	Comments/Suppleant representatives
Nils Kristen Jacobsen	Norwegian Labour Party	
Alfred Meyer Henningsen	Norwegian Labour Party	
Martin Buvik	Conservative Party of Norway	
Kåre Martin Hansen	Norwegian Labour Party	
Johannes Gilleberg	Centre Party (Norway)	
Helge Jakobsen	Venstre (Norway)	

== Nord-Trøndelag ==
Name	Party	Comments/Suppleant representatives
Leif Granli	Norwegian Labour Party	
Jon Leirfall	Centre Party (Norway)	
Guttorm Hansen	Norwegian Labour Party	
Bjarne Lyngstad	Venstre (Norway)	Appointed to Cabinet to September 1969, during which time he was replaced by Ola H. Kveli.
Johan Støa	Norwegian Labour Party	
Inge Einarsen Bartnes	Centre Party (Norway)	

== Sør-Trøndelag ==
Name	Party	Comments/Suppleant representatives
Olav Gjærevoll	Norwegian Labour Party	Briefly appointed to the Cabinet in early October 1965, before Per Borten formed his first cabinet. During this short period he was replaced by Jenny Lund.
Iver Johan Unsgård	Norwegian Labour Party	
Otto Lyng	Conservative Party of Norway	
Håkon Johnsen	Norwegian Labour Party	
Per Borten	Centre Party (Norway)	Prime Minister. Was replaced by Einar Hole Moxnes (1965–1968) and, when Moxnes became appointed to the Cabinet, Johan Syrstad (1968–1969).
Martin Skaaren	Conservative Party of Norway	
Rolf Fjeldvær	Norwegian Labour Party	
Lars Tangvik	Venstre (Norway)	
Kristoffer Rein	Christian Democratic Party of Norway	
Andreas Wormdahl	Norwegian Labour Party	

== Vestfold ==
Name	Party	Comments/Suppleant representatives
Asbjørn Lillås	Norwegian Labour Party	
Johan Møller Warmedal	Conservative Party of Norway	
Johan Andersen	Norwegian Labour Party	Died in May 1968. Was replaced by Willy Jansson.
Rolf Schjerven	Conservative Party of Norway	
Gunvor Katharina Eker	Norwegian Labour Party	
Theodor Dyring	Centre Party (Norway)	
Borghild Bondevik Haga	Venstre (Norway)	

== Østfold ==
Name	Party	Comments/Suppleant representatives
Nils Hønsvald	Norwegian Labour Party	
Ingvar Bakken	Norwegian Labour Party	
Svenn Thorkild Stray	Conservative Party of Norway	
Martha Frederikke Johannessen	Norwegian Labour Party	
Erik Braadland	Centre Party (Norway)	Elected on a joint list Centre Party/Venstre
Arvid Johanson	Norwegian Labour Party	
Per Sonerud	Conservative Party of Norway	
Lars Korvald	Christian Democratic Party of Norway	
