= Vestfold (Storting constituency) =

Constituency of the Storting, the national legislature of Norway

- Constituency for the Storting
- Location of Vestfold within Norway
- County: Vestfold
- Population: 258,185 (2025)
- Electorate: 191,631 (2025)
- Area: 2,168 km^{2} (2025)

Current constituency
- Created: 1921
- Seats: List: 6 (2005–present); 7 (1953–2005); 4 (1921–1953)
- Members of the Storting: List: Maria-Karine Aasen-Svensrud (Ap); Anne Grethe Hauan (FrP); Erlend Larsen (H); Morten Stordalen (FrP); Julie Estdahl Stuestøl (MDG); Bjørn-Kristian Svendsrud (FrP); Truls Vasvik (Ap)
- Created from: List: Brunla; Jarlsberg; Sandeherred; Skoger

Vestfold is one of the 19 multi-member constituencies of the Storting, the national legislature of Norway. The constituency was established in 1921 following the introduction of proportional representation for elections to the Storting. It is conterminous with the county of Vestfold. The constituency currently elects six of the 169 members of the Storting using the open party-list proportional representation electoral system. At the 2025 parliamentary election it had 191,631 registered electors.

== Electoral system ==
Vestfold currently elects six of the 169 members of the Storting using the open (Note: Although technically elections to the Storting have open lists, they are in effect closed lists as a majority of those voting for a party must make changes to the lists for the changes to take effect, which has never happened since the introduction of proportional representation in 1921, and as result candidates are elected in the order submitted by the party.) party-list proportional representation electoral system. Constituency seats are allocated by the County Electoral Committee using the Modified Sainte-Laguë method. Compensatory seats (seats at large or levelling seats) are calculated based on the national vote and are allocated by the National Electoral Committee using the Modified Sainte-Laguë method at the constituency level (one for each constituency). Only parties that reach the 4% national threshold compete for compensatory seats.

== Election results ==
=== Summary ===
Election	Communists K			Reds R / RV / FMS			Socialist Left SV / SF			Labour Ap			Greens MDG			Centre Sp / Bp / L			Liberals V			Christian Democrats KrF			Conservatives H			Progress FrP / ALP		
Election	Votes	%	Seats	Votes	%	Seats	Votes	%	Seats	Votes	%	Seats	Votes	%	Seats	Votes	%	Seats	Votes	%	Seats	Votes	%	Seats	Votes	%	Seats	Votes	%	Seats
2025				7,431	4.91%	0	6,189	4.09%	0	41,589	27.49%	2	6,488	4.29%	0	4,982	3.29%	0	5,291	3.50%	0	6,239	4.12%	0	24,968	16.50%	1	41,731	27.58%	3
2021				6,155	4.43%	0	8,670	6.24%	0	37,518	26.98%	2	5,428	3.90%	0	13,775	9.91%	1	5,771	4.15%	0	4,861	3.50%	0	34,831	25.05%	2	17,271	12.42%	1
2017				2,602	1.86%	0	6,927	4.95%	0	39,118	27.96%	2	4,107	2.94%	0	8,777	6.27%	0	5,373	3.84%	0	5,159	3.69%	0	42,179	30.14%	3	23,628	16.89%	1
2013				932	0.68%	0	5,266	3.81%	0	40,869	29.61%	2	3,407	2.47%	0	4,084	2.96%	0	6,228	4.51%	0	6,735	4.88%	0	41,357	29.96%	2	26,977	19.54%	2
2009				848	0.65%	0	8,551	6.52%	0	44,169	33.69%	3	495	0.38%	0	4,257	3.25%	0	3,944	3.01%	0	6,164	4.70%	0	25,752	19.64%	1	35,687	27.22%	2
2005	79	0.06%	0	801	0.62%	0	10,808	8.36%	0	39,085	30.24%	3	312	0.24%	0	4,649	3.60%	0	6,513	5.04%	0	7,775	6.02%	0	19,790	15.31%	1	37,886	29.31%	2
2001	38	0.03%	0	683	0.55%	0	14,308	11.56%	1	26,763	21.62%	2	387	0.31%	0	4,112	3.32%	0	3,507	2.83%	0	13,612	10.99%	1	31,524	25.46%	2	23,122	18.68%	1
1997	62	0.05%	0	1,315	1.06%	0	6,514	5.26%	0	41,517	33.50%	3	329	0.27%	0	6,947	5.61%	0	4,005	3.23%	0	15,529	12.53%	1	22,384	18.06%	1	24,873	20.07%	2
1993				649	0.55%	0	7,660	6.51%	0	41,623	35.36%	3	286	0.24%	0	15,588	13.24%	1	3,236	2.75%	0	8,074	6.86%	0	27,167	23.08%	2	11,850	10.07%	1
1989				664	0.53%	0	10,474	8.28%	1	38,034	30.08%	3	645	0.51%	0	5,713	4.52%	0	3,414	2.70%	0	8,992	7.11%	0	36,579	28.93%	2	20,884	16.52%	1
1985	90	0.07%	0	464	0.39%	0	4,762	3.95%	0	42,647	35.40%	3				5,360	4.45%	0	3,211	2.67%	0	8,456	7.02%	1	49,234	40.87%	3	5,746	4.77%	0
1981	131	0.11%	0	588	0.50%	0	3,388	2.91%	0	39,517	33.89%	3				8,616	7.39%	0				9,544	8.18%	0	48,812	41.86%	4	5,446	4.67%	0
1977	157	0.15%	0	361	0.34%	0	2,741	2.55%	0	42,757	39.81%	3				7,731	7.20%	0	2,984	2.78%	0	10,940	10.19%	1	36,244	33.75%	3	2,139	1.99%	0
1973				296	0.30%	0	8,919	8.94%	0	33,750	33.84%	3				10,598	10.63%	1				10,287	10.31%	1	26,441	26.51%	2	6,591	6.61%	0
1969	641	0.65%	0				2,602	2.63%	0	43,781	44.31%	4				13,854	14.02%	1	8,290	8.39%	0				29,647	30.00%	2			
1965	666	0.71%	0				4,528	4.83%	0	39,750	42.43%	3				10,057	10.74%	1	8,502	9.08%	1				30,172	32.21%	2			
1961	1,825	1.93%	0							44,108	46.64%	4				7,226	7.64%	0	6,569	6.95%	0	5,950	6.29%	0	28,885	30.55%	3			
1957	1,622	1.77%	0							43,838	47.78%	4							8,226	8.97%	0	6,172	6.73%	0	31,890	34.76%	3			
1953	2,369	2.63%	0							41,628	46.26%	4				6,557	7.29%	0	7,089	7.88%	0	5,773	6.41%	0	26,580	29.53%	3			
1949	1,476	2.45%	0							26,077	43.31%	2							10,983	18.24%	1	4,050	6.73%	0	17,442	28.97%	1			
1945	3,571	7.22%	0							20,292	41.04%	2				5,457	11.04%	0	6,659	13.47%	0				13,464	27.23%	2			
1936										16,404	35.01%	2				5,501	11.74%	0	6,869	14.66%	0				16,964	36.20%	2			
1933	145	0.38%	0							11,544	30.03%	1				5,116	13.31%	0	6,397	16.64%	1				13,379	34.80%	2			
1930										7,667	21.06%	1				5,962	16.37%	0	5,981	16.43%	1				16,801	46.14%	2			
1927										7,928	28.00%	1				5,119	18.08%	1	4,022	14.20%	0				11,248	39.72%	2			
1924	227	0.83%	0							3,498	12.85%	0				4,349	15.98%	1	3,871	14.22%	0				13,459	49.46%	3			
1921										3,289	13.65%	0				3,362	13.95%	0	3,362	13.95%	1				12,588	52.24%	3			

(Excludes compensatory seats. Figures in italics represent joint lists.)

=== Detailed ===
==== 2020s ====
===== 2025 =====
Results of the 2025 parliamentary election held on 8 September 2025:

Party		Votes per municipality						Total votes	%	Seats		
Party		Færder	Holme- strand	Horten	Larvik	Sande- fjord	Tøns- berg	Total votes	%	Con.	Com.	Tot.
Progress Party	FrP	4,170	4,747	4,270	8,353	10,993	9,198	41,731	27.58%	3	0	3
Labour Party	Ap	4,770	4,250	5,077	8,331	9,328	9,833	41,589	27.49%	2	0	2
Conservative Party	H	3,261	2,095	2,386	4,224	6,766	6,236	24,968	16.50%	1	0	1
Red Party	R	889	830	1,047	1,287	1,701	1,677	7,431	4.91%	0	0	0
Green Party	MDG	1,016	581	875	932	1,399	1,685	6,488	4.29%	0	1	1
Christian Democratic Party	KrF	553	632	518	1,214	1,737	1,585	6,239	4.12%	0	0	0
Socialist Left Party	SV	723	535	840	1,141	1,391	1,559	6,189	4.09%	0	0	0
Liberal Party	V	696	434	577	797	1,409	1,378	5,291	3.50%	0	0	0
Centre Party	Sp	293	778	343	1,179	1,163	1,226	4,982	3.29%	0	0	0
Norway Democrats	ND	132	168	133	223	298	274	1,228	0.81%	0	0	0
Pensioners' Party	PP	116	109	121	280	289	266	1,181	0.78%	0	0	0
Generation Party	GP	133	121	129	194	241	253	1,071	0.71%	0	0	0
Industry and Business Party	INP	94	114	117	173	271	200	969	0.64%	0	0	0
Conservative	K	64	62	38	168	232	190	754	0.50%	0	0	0
Peace and Justice	FOR	57	33	59	79	113	99	440	0.29%	0	0	0
DNI Party	DNI	31	43	22	43	69	79	287	0.19%	0	0	0
Welfare and Innovation Party	VIP	36	22	29	45	55	72	259	0.17%	0	0	0
Center Party	PS	25	18	19	35	43	69	209	0.14%	0	0	0
Valid votes		17,059	15,572	16,600	28,698	37,498	35,879	151,306	100.00%	6	1	7
Blank votes		126	127	152	208	315	307	1,235	0.81%			
Rejected votes – other		31	33	20	48	7	27	166	0.11%			
Total polled		17,216	15,732	16,772	28,954	37,820	36,213	152,707	79.69%			
Registered electors		20,869	19,600	21,153	36,845	48,585	44,579	191,631				
Turnout		82.50%	80.27%	79.29%	78.58%	77.84%	81.23%	79.69%				

The following candidates were elected:

- Constituency seats - Maria-Karine Aasen-Svensrud (Ap); Anne Grethe Hauan (FrP); Erlend Larsen (H); Morten Stordalen (FrP); Bjørn-Kristian Svendsrud (FrP); and Truls Vasvik (Ap).
- Compensatory seat - Julie Estdahl Stuestøl (MDG).

===== 2021 =====
Results of the 2021 parliamentary election held on 13 September 2021:

Party		Votes per municipality						Total votes	%	Seats		
Party		Færder	Holme- strand	Horten	Larvik	Sande- fjord	Tøns- berg	Total votes	%	Con.	Com.	Tot.
Labour Party	Ap	4,073	3,742	5,026	7,449	8,602	8,626	37,518	26.98%	2	0	2
Conservative Party	H	4,777	3,040	3,317	5,879	9,469	8,349	34,831	25.05%	2	0	2
Progress Party	FrP	1,719	1,928	1,653	3,814	4,481	3,676	17,271	12.42%	1	0	1
Centre Party	Sp	1,040	2,063	1,109	3,006	3,208	3,349	13,775	9.91%	1	0	1
Socialist Left Party	SV	1,091	727	1,174	1,548	1,937	2,193	8,670	6.24%	0	1	1
Red Party	R	790	568	972	1,053	1,351	1,421	6,155	4.43%	0	0	0
Liberal Party	V	853	415	626	914	1,438	1,525	5,771	4.15%	0	0	0
Green Party	MDG	829	422	634	838	1,204	1,501	5,428	3.90%	0	0	0
Christian Democratic Party	KrF	440	455	399	982	1,296	1,289	4,861	3.50%	0	0	0
Democrats in Norway		188	239	193	329	530	347	1,826	1.31%	0	0	0
The Christians	PDK	56	49	44	141	196	176	662	0.48%	0	0	0
Pensioners' Party	PP	58	72	72	117	141	102	562	0.40%	0	0	0
Industry and Business Party	INP	59	33	48	56	132	75	403	0.29%	0	0	0
Health Party		41	42	58	66	98	78	383	0.28%	0	0	0
Center Party		30	32	35	63	134	87	381	0.27%	0	0	0
Capitalist Party		26	27	16	25	54	50	198	0.14%	0	0	0
Alliance - Alternative for Norway		11	12	16	30	57	20	146	0.11%	0	0	0
Pirate Party of Norway		14	11	15	14	39	32	125	0.09%	0	0	0
People's Action No to More Road Tolls	FNB	4	10	9	9	17	22	71	0.05%	0	0	0
Valid votes		16,099	13,887	15,416	26,333	34,384	32,918	139,037	100.00%	6	1	7
Blank votes		107	95	123	166	213	250	954	0.68%			
Rejected votes – other		19	20	4	27	13	20	103	0.07%			
Total polled		16,225	14,002	15,543	26,526	34,610	33,188	140,094	76.57%			
Registered electors		20,215	18,287	20,475	35,551	46,317	42,116	182,961				
Turnout		80.26%	76.57%	75.91%	74.61%	74.72%	78.80%	76.57%				

The following candidates were elected:

- Constituency seats - Maria-Karine Aasen-Svensrud (Ap); Kathrine Kleveland (Sp); Erlend Larsen (H); Morten Stordalen (FrP); Truls Vasvik (Ap); and Lene Westgaard-Halle (H).
- Compensatory seat - Grete Wold (SV).

==== 2010s ====
===== 2017 =====
Results of the 2017 parliamentary election held on 11 September 2017:

Party		Votes per municipality												Total votes	%	Seats		
Party		Hof	Holme- strand	Horten	Lardal	Larvik	Nøtter- øy	Re	Sande	Sande- fjord	Svel- vik	Tjøme	Tøns- berg	Total votes	%	Con.	Com.	Tot.
Conservative Party	H	438	1,744	4,153	243	6,880	4,573	1,279	1,473	11,319	1,053	965	8,059	42,179	30.14%	3	0	3
Labour Party	Ap	477	1,879	5,023	468	7,326	3,429	1,222	1,454	8,806	1,021	714	7,299	39,118	27.96%	2	0	2
Progress Party	FrP	278	989	2,308	213	4,882	1,789	948	1,170	5,838	775	522	3,916	23,628	16.89%	1	0	1
Centre Party	Sp	299	487	776	292	1,499	437	955	540	1,902	280	159	1,151	8,777	6.27%	0	0	0
Socialist Left Party	SV	80	302	954	39	1,085	704	207	184	1,544	124	153	1,551	6,927	4.95%	0	0	0
Liberal Party	V	41	226	541	26	861	614	118	192	1,354	89	149	1,162	5,373	3.84%	0	1	1
Christian Democratic Party	KrF	54	230	390	39	1,089	416	325	131	1,237	78	68	1,102	5,159	3.69%	0	0	0
Green Party	MDG	61	166	540	25	664	478	138	113	903	90	141	788	4,107	2.94%	0	0	0
Red Party	R	34	138	478	21	410	260	64	74	482	59	73	509	2,602	1.86%	0	0	0
Health Party		7	34	73	14	127	40	26	27	176	21	9	118	672	0.48%	0	0	0
The Christians	PDK	8	20	12	5	100	26	11	4	137	5	3	72	403	0.29%	0	0	0
Capitalist Party		2	20	18	1	28	27	16	16	96	7	6	72	309	0.22%	0	0	0
Pirate Party of Norway		5	10	26	2	32	14	8	7	63	4	9	37	217	0.16%	0	0	0
The Alliance		1	6	18	5	31	21	5	13	48	4	8	26	186	0.13%	0	0	0
Democrats in Norway		3	11	18	3	33	4	5	9	49	4	0	21	160	0.11%	0	0	0
Coastal Party	KP	0	3	8	4	12	17	8	4	35	0	8	12	111	0.08%	0	0	0
Valid votes		1,788	6,265	15,336	1,400	25,059	12,849	5,335	5,411	33,989	3,614	2,987	25,895	139,928	100.00%	6	1	7
Blank votes		11	41	121	12	169	88	44	39	226	36	34	177	998	0.71%			
Rejected votes – other		0	2	18	2	24	40	6	5	37	3	14	31	182	0.13%			
Total polled		1,799	6,308	15,475	1,414	25,252	12,977	5,385	5,455	34,252	3,653	3,035	26,103	141,108	77.70%			
Registered electors		2,303	8,108	19,981	1,829	32,921	16,123	6,831	6,785	44,901	4,873	3,817	33,140	181,612				
Turnout		78.12%	77.80%	77.45%	77.31%	76.70%	80.49%	78.83%	80.40%	76.28%	74.96%	79.51%	78.77%	77.70%				

The following candidates were elected:

- Constituency seats - Maria-Karine Aasen-Svensrud (Ap); Dag Terje Andersen (Ap); Erlend Larsen (H); Kårstein Eidem Løvaas (H); Morten Stordalen (FrP); and Lene Westgaard-Halle (H).
- Compensatory seat - Carl-Erik Grimstad (V).

===== 2013 =====
Results of the 2013 parliamentary election held on 8 and 9 September 2013:

Party		Votes per municipality														Total votes	%	Seats		
Party		Ande- bu	Hof	Holme- strand	Horten	Lardal	Larvik	Nøtter- øy	Re	Sande	Sande- fjord	Stokke	Svel- vik	Tjøme	Tøns- berg	Total votes	%	Con.	Com.	Tot.
Conservative Party	H	794	418	1,629	4,395	296	6,695	4,579	1,245	1,338	8,379	1,892	1,057	990	7,650	41,357	29.96%	2	0	2
Labour Party	Ap	942	569	2,124	5,135	544	7,724	3,445	1,291	1,584	6,692	1,861	1,190	780	6,988	40,869	29.61%	2	0	2
Progress Party	FrP	594	291	1,075	2,582	209	5,964	2,155	952	1,192	5,269	1,177	897	605	4,015	26,977	19.54%	2	0	2
Christian Democratic Party	KrF	188	59	286	542	72	1,419	552	401	186	1,080	434	107	91	1,318	6,735	4.88%	0	1	1
Liberal Party	V	127	67	234	728	37	937	673	181	224	1,176	259	135	128	1,322	6,228	4.51%	0	0	0
Socialist Left Party	SV	92	71	247	737	36	725	591	150	124	882	252	67	134	1,158	5,266	3.81%	0	0	0
Centre Party	Sp	250	194	241	244	188	616	139	737	294	327	294	82	41	437	4,084	2.96%	0	0	0
Green Party	MDG	58	49	129	457	26	575	429	81	59	496	142	73	157	676	3,407	2.47%	0	0	0
Red Party	R	16	15	45	161	8	152	104	23	17	156	35	10	28	162	932	0.68%	0	0	0
The Christians (Norway)	PDK	12	4	53	43	13	148	49	41	10	146	55	14	5	98	691	0.50%	0	0	0
Pensioners' Party	PP	7	4	16	52	5	73	34	12	8	280	26	7	8	64	596	0.43%	0	0	0
Pirate Party of Norway		11	6	20	79	4	63	41	17	13	83	19	11	13	94	474	0.34%	0	0	0
Christian Unity Party	KSP	11	4	4	21	4	41	12	5	2	63	9	1	3	25	205	0.15%	0	0	0
Coastal Party	KP	2	0	7	18	3	10	17	6	4	47	4	7	6	26	157	0.11%	0	0	0
Democrats in Norway		1	0	2	8	0	14	3	2	1	13	3	2	1	15	65	0.05%	0	0	0
Valid votes		3,105	1,751	6,112	15,202	1,445	25,156	12,823	5,144	5,056	25,089	6,462	3,660	2,990	24,048	138,043	100.00%	6	1	7
Blank votes		12	10	28	94	9	135	31	44	36	87	37	18	14	152	707	0.51%			
Rejected votes – other		1	0	7	31	0	5	11	3	2	3	3	2	2	5	75	0.05%			
Total polled		3,118	1,761	6,147	15,327	1,454	25,296	12,865	5,191	5,094	25,179	6,502	3,680	3,006	24,205	138,825	78.53%			
Registered electors		4,102	2,260	7,863	19,625	1,849	32,405	15,750	6,495	6,360	32,712	8,209	4,855	3,730	30,564	176,779				
Turnout		76.01%	77.92%	78.18%	78.10%	78.64%	78.06%	81.68%	79.92%	80.09%	76.97%	79.21%	75.80%	80.59%	79.19%	78.53%				

The following candidates were elected:

- Constituency seats - Dag Terje Andersen (Ap); Anders Anundsen (FrP); Svein Flåtten (H); Kårstein Eidem Løvaas (H); Sonja Mandt (Ap); and Morten Stordalen (FrP).
- Compensatory seat - Anders Tyvand (KrF).

==== 2000s ====
===== 2009 =====
Results of the 2009 parliamentary election held on 13 and 14 September 2009:

Party		Votes per municipality														Total votes	%	Seats		
Party		Ande- bu	Hof	Holme- strand	Horten	Lardal	Larvik	Nøtter- øy	Re	Sande	Sande- fjord	Stokke	Svel- vik	Tjøme	Tøns- berg	Total votes	%	Con.	Com.	Tot.
Labour Party	Ap	902	636	2,313	5,683	601	8,695	3,625	1,365	1,766	7,181	1,924	1,286	832	7,360	44,169	33.69%	3	0	3
Progress Party	FrP	760	401	1,428	3,512	290	6,940	3,229	1,259	1,310	6,995	1,580	1,138	877	5,968	35,687	27.22%	2	0	2
Conservative Party	H	484	271	965	2,597	177	4,221	3,003	710	747	5,729	1,089	666	568	4,525	25,752	19.64%	1	0	1
Socialist Left Party	SV	160	100	348	1,199	54	1,380	915	245	219	1,342	407	127	233	1,822	8,551	6.52%	0	1	1
Christian Democratic Party	KrF	181	56	234	492	67	1,379	487	398	135	1,006	414	97	68	1,150	6,164	4.70%	0	0	0
Centre Party	Sp	221	223	219	253	196	689	149	712	300	340	315	103	40	497	4,257	3.25%	0	0	0
Liberal Party	V	92	47	139	387	38	640	443	124	125	692	204	69	109	835	3,944	3.01%	0	0	0
Red Party	R	13	13	40	161	6	135	121	14	12	127	34	12	20	140	848	0.65%	0	0	0
Pensioners' Party	PP	7	7	19	59	4	68	47	8	12	187	18	12	9	65	522	0.40%	0	0	0
Green Party	MDG	15	5	17	54	1	71	74	10	9	113	21	7	10	88	495	0.38%	0	0	0
Christian Unity Party	KSP	9	3	12	27	4	59	18	18	4	56	29	6	3	51	299	0.23%	0	0	0
Norwegian Patriots	NP	6	0	6	29	1	39	13	12	7	24	8	9	1	28	183	0.14%	0	0	0
Coastal Party	KP	19	1	7	16	1	20	10	7	7	23	5	8	7	9	140	0.11%	0	0	0
Democrats in Norway		8	2	2	9	1	9	7	11	3	15	6	0	0	33	106	0.08%	0	0	0
Valid votes		2,877	1,765	5,749	14,478	1,441	24,345	12,141	4,893	4,656	23,830	6,054	3,540	2,777	22,571	131,117	100.00%	6	1	7
Blank votes		9	7	40	73	7	0	70	20	24	80	28	20	16	113	507	0.38%			
Rejected votes – other		3	0	0	2	0	10	3	0	6	20	1	0	2	40	87	0.07%			
Total polled		2,889	1,772	5,789	14,553	1,448	24,355	12,214	4,913	4,686	23,930	6,083	3,560	2,795	22,724	131,711	76.83%			
Registered electors		3,856	2,268	7,598	19,001	1,841	31,919	15,411	6,281	5,978	31,864	7,809	4,771	3,559	29,267	171,423				
Turnout		74.92%	78.13%	76.19%	76.59%	78.65%	76.30%	79.26%	78.22%	78.39%	75.10%	77.90%	74.62%	78.53%	77.64%	76.83%				

The following candidates were elected:

- Constituency seats - Dag Terje Andersen (Ap); Anders Anundsen (FrP); Svein Flåtten (H); Steinar Gullvåg (Ap); Sonja Mandt (Ap); and Per Arne Olsen (FrP).
- Compensatory seat - Inga Marte Thorkildsen (SV).

===== 2005 =====
Results of the 2005 parliamentary election held on 11 and 12 September 2005:

Party		Votes per municipality														Total votes	%	Seats		
Party		Ande- bu	Hof	Holme- strand	Horten	Lardal	Larvik	Nøtter- øy	Re	Sande	Sande- fjord	Stokke	Svel- vik	Tjøme	Tøns- berg	Total votes	%	Con.	Com.	Tot.
Labour Party	Ap	735	619	2,125	5,207	567	8,068	2,914	1,082	1,606	6,601	1,582	1,225	616	6,138	39,085	30.24%	3	0	3
Progress Party	FrP	744	377	1,553	3,769	287	6,975	3,767	1,292	1,352	7,536	1,604	1,111	1,036	6,483	37,886	29.31%	2	0	2
Conservative Party	H	424	229	763	2,041	168	3,340	2,247	557	570	4,271	805	565	389	3,421	19,790	15.31%	1	0	1
Socialist Left Party	SV	193	169	477	1,439	67	1,742	1,118	299	284	1,789	478	221	274	2,258	10,808	8.36%	0	1	1
Christian Democratic Party	KrF	214	115	304	648	84	1,643	613	500	165	1,327	543	136	94	1,389	7,775	6.02%	0	0	0
Liberal Party	V	177	65	248	630	67	1,243	685	260	206	1,165	300	128	145	1,194	6,513	5.04%	0	0	0
Centre Party	Sp	250	193	214	322	190	848	182	663	292	425	361	108	45	556	4,649	3.60%	0	0	0
Red Electoral Alliance	RV	6	16	58	163	5	130	91	16	12	110	35	13	21	125	801	0.62%	0	0	0
Pensioners' Party	PP	13	2	24	61	5	65	45	13	7	232	22	6	7	68	570	0.44%	0	0	0
Reform Party		11	1	5	24	0	5	137	6	1	16	12	1	13	231	463	0.36%	0	0	0
Coastal Party	KP	4	2	13	39	4	72	29	15	15	80	11	11	11	43	349	0.27%	0	0	0
Green Party	MDG	12	6	6	23	2	52	55	8	10	71	15	5	7	40	312	0.24%	0	0	0
Democrats		4	0	14	16	0	22	19	17	4	12	13	2	7	37	167	0.13%	0	0	0
Communist Party of Norway	K	1	1	2	8	1	15	3	0	2	12	15	0	1	18	79	0.06%	0	0	0
Valid votes		2,788	1,795	5,806	14,390	1,447	24,220	11,905	4,728	4,526	23,647	5,796	3,532	2,666	22,001	129,247	100.00%	6	1	7
Blank votes		13	14	33	75	15	56	50	21	12	84	31	27	13	109	553	0.43%			
Rejected votes – other		0	0	2	17	1	3	11	9	0	19	1	4	2	38	107	0.08%			
Total polled		2,801	1,809	5,841	14,482	1,463	24,279	11,966	4,758	4,538	23,750	5,828	3,563	2,681	22,148	129,907	78.04%			
Registered electors		3,692	2,277	7,384	18,596	1,858	31,319	14,904	5,968	5,640	31,120	7,434	4,711	3,411	28,154	166,468				
Turnout		75.87%	79.45%	79.10%	77.88%	78.74%	77.52%	80.29%	79.73%	80.46%	76.32%	78.40%	75.63%	78.60%	78.67%	78.04%				

The following candidates were elected:

- Constituency seats - Dag Terje Andersen (Ap); Anders Anundsen (FrP); Svein Flåtten (H); Steinar Gullvåg (Ap); Sonja Mandt (Ap); and Per Ove Width (FrP).
- Compensatory seat - Inga Marte Thorkildsen (SV).

===== 2001 =====
Results of the 2001 parliamentary election held on 9 and 10 September 2001:

Party		Votes	%	Seats		
Party		Votes	%	Con.	Com.	Tot.
Conservative Party	H	31,524	25.46%	2	0	2
Labour Party	Ap	26,763	21.62%	2	0	2
Progress Party	FrP	23,122	18.68%	1	1	2
Socialist Left Party	SV	14,308	11.56%	1	0	1
Christian Democratic Party	KrF	13,612	10.99%	1	0	1
Centre Party	Sp	4,112	3.32%	0	0	0
Liberal Party	V	3,507	2.83%	0	0	0
The Political Party	DPP	1,353	1.09%	0	0	0
Pensioners' Party	PP	1,093	0.88%	0	0	0
Coastal Party	KP	703	0.57%	0	0	0
Red Electoral Alliance	RV	683	0.55%	0	0	0
Green Party	MDG	387	0.31%	0	0	0
Christian Unity Party	KSP	250	0.20%	0	0	0
Fatherland Party	FLP	109	0.09%	0	0	0
Norwegian People's Party	NFP	58	0.05%	0	0	0
Liberal People's Party	DLF	43	0.03%	0	0	0
Communist Party of Norway	K	38	0.03%	0	0	0
County Lists		2,141	1.73%	0	0	0
Valid votes		123,806	100.00%	7	1	8
Rejected votes		666	0.54%			
Total polled		124,472	76.62%			
Registered electors		162,464				

The following candidates were elected:

- Constituency seats - Svein Flåtten (H); Hans Kristian Hogsnes (H); Jørgen Kosmo (Ap); Anne Helen Rui (Ap); Elsa Skarbøvik (KrF); Inga Marte Thorkildsen (SV); and Per Ove Width (FrP).
- Compensatory seat - Per Erik Monsen (FrP).

==== 1990s ====
===== 1997 =====
Results of the 1997 parliamentary election held on 15 September 1997:

Party		Votes	%	Seats		
Party		Votes	%	Con.	Com.	Tot.
Labour Party	Ap	41,517	33.50%	3	0	3
Progress Party	FrP	24,873	20.07%	2	0	2
Conservative Party	H	22,384	18.06%	1	0	1
Christian Democratic Party	KrF	15,529	12.53%	1	0	1
Centre Party	Sp	6,947	5.61%	0	0	0
Socialist Left Party	SV	6,514	5.26%	0	0	0
Liberal Party	V	4,005	3.23%	0	0	0
Red Electoral Alliance	RV	1,315	1.06%	0	0	0
Green Party	MDG	329	0.27%	0	0	0
Fatherland Party	FLP	224	0.18%	0	0	0
Natural Law Party		135	0.11%	0	0	0
Liberal People's Party	DLF	80	0.06%	0	0	0
Communist Party of Norway	K	62	0.05%	0	0	0
Valid votes		123,914	100.00%	7	0	7
Rejected votes		571	0.46%			
Total polled		124,485	78.85%			
Registered electors		157,882				

The following candidates were elected:

- Constituency seats - Dag Terje Andersen (Ap); Ole Johs. Brunæs (H); Jørgen Kosmo (Ap); Per Erik Monsen (FrP); Anne Helen Rui (Ap); Elsa Skarbøvik (KrF); and Per Ove Width (FrP).

===== 1993 =====
Results of the 1993 parliamentary election held on 12 and 13 September 1993:

Party		Votes	%	Seats		
Party		Votes	%	Con.	Com.	Tot.
Labour Party	Ap	41,623	35.36%	3	0	3
Conservative Party	H	27,167	23.08%	2	0	2
Centre Party	Sp	15,588	13.24%	1	0	1
Progress Party	FrP	11,850	10.07%	1	0	1
Christian Democratic Party	KrF	8,074	6.86%	0	0	0
Socialist Left Party	SV	7,660	6.51%	0	0	0
Liberal Party	V	3,236	2.75%	0	0	0
Fatherland Party	FLP	1,136	0.97%	0	0	0
Red Electoral Alliance	RV	649	0.55%	0	0	0
New Future Coalition Party	SNF	372	0.32%	0	0	0
Green Party	MDG	286	0.24%	0	0	0
Liberal People's Party	DLF	60	0.05%	0	0	0
Valid votes		117,701	100.00%	7	0	7
Rejected votes		708	0.60%			
Total polled		118,409	76.57%			
Registered electors		154,644				

The following candidates were elected:

- Constituency seats - Ole Johs. Brunæs (H); Oscar Hillgaar (FrP); Jørgen Kosmo (Ap); Eva Lian (Sp); Karin Lian (Ap); Arild Lund (H); and Anne Helen Rui (Ap).

==== 1980s ====
===== 1989 =====
Results of the 1989 parliamentary election held on 10 and 11 September 1989:

Party		Votes	%	Seats		
Party		Votes	%	Con.	Com.	Tot.
Labour Party	Ap	38,034	30.08%	3	0	3
Conservative Party	H	36,579	28.93%	2	0	2
Progress Party	FrP	20,884	16.52%	1	0	1
Socialist Left Party	SV	10,474	8.28%	1	0	1
Christian Democratic Party	KrF	8,992	7.11%	0	0	0
Centre Party	Sp	5,713	4.52%	0	0	0
Liberal Party	V	3,414	2.70%	0	0	0
Pensioners' Party	PP	950	0.75%	0	0	0
County Lists for Environment and Solidarity	FMS	664	0.53%	0	0	0
Green Party	MDG	645	0.51%	0	0	0
Free Elected Representatives		46	0.04%	0	0	0
Liberals-Europe Party		34	0.03%	0	0	0
Valid votes		126,429	100.00%	7	0	7
Rejected votes		239	0.19%			
Total polled		126,668	84.26%			
Registered electors		150,323				

The following candidates were elected:

- Constituency seats - Ole Johs. Brunæs (H); Inger Dag Steen (SV); Oscar Hillgaar (FrP); Jørgen Kosmo (Ap); Karin Lian (Ap); Ingrid I. Willoch (H); and Ernst Wroldsen (Ap).

===== 1985 =====
Results of the 1985 parliamentary election held on 8 and 9 September 1985:

Party		Party			List Alliance		
Party		Votes	%	Seats	Votes	%	Seats
Conservative Party	H	49,234	40.87%	4	49,234	41.04%	3
Labour Party	Ap	42,647	35.40%	3	42,647	35.55%	3
Christian Democratic Party	KrF	8,456	7.02%	0	13,316	11.10%	1
Centre Party	Sp	5,360	4.45%	0	13,316	11.10%	1
Progress Party	FrP	5,746	4.77%	0	5,746	4.79%	0
Socialist Left Party	SV	4,762	3.95%	0	4,762	3.97%	0
Liberal Party	V	3,211	2.67%	0	3,211	2.68%	0
Red Electoral Alliance	RV	464	0.39%	0	464	0.39%	0
Liberal People's Party	DLF	462	0.38%	0	462	0.39%	0
Communist Party of Norway	K	90	0.07%	0	90	0.08%	0
Free Elected Representatives		30	0.02%	0	30	0.03%	0
Valid votes		120,462	100.00%	7	119,962	100.00%	7
Rejected votes		168	0.14%				
Total polled		120,630	83.77%				
Registered electors		143,995					

As the list alliance was entitled to more seats contesting as an alliance than it was contesting as individual parties, the distribution of seats was as list alliance votes. The KrF-Sp list alliance's additional seat was allocated to the Christian Democratic Party.

The following candidates were elected: Thor Knudsen (H); Jørgen Kosmo (Ap); Karin Lian (Ap); Åge Ramberg (KrF); Morten Steenstrup (H); Ingrid I. Willoch (H); and Ernst Wroldsen (Ap).

===== 1981 =====
Results of the 1981 parliamentary election held on 13 and 14 September 1981:

Party		Votes	%	Seats
Conservative Party	H	48,812	41.86%	4
Labour Party	Ap	39,517	33.89%	3
Christian Democratic Party	KrF	9,544	8.18%	0
Centre Party and Liberal Party	Sp-V	8,616	7.39%	0
Progress Party	FrP	5,446	4.67%	0
Socialist Left Party	SV	3,388	2.91%	0
Red Electoral Alliance	RV	588	0.50%	0
Liberal People's Party	DLF	497	0.43%	0
Communist Party of Norway	K	131	0.11%	0
Free Elected Representatives		41	0.04%	0
Plebiscite Party		39	0.03%	0
Valid votes		116,619	100.00%	7
Rejected votes		151	0.13%	
Total polled		116,770	84.30%	
Registered electors		138,524		

The following candidates were elected: Alf Martin Bjørnø (Ap); Thor Knudsen (H); Astrid Murberg Martinsen (Ap); Karen Sogn (H); Morten Steenstrup (H); Ingrid I. Willoch (H); and Ernst Wroldsen (Ap).

==== 1970s ====
===== 1977 =====
Results of the 1977 parliamentary election held on 11 and 12 September 1977:

Party		Votes	%	Seats
Labour Party	Ap	42,757	39.81%	3
Conservative Party	H	36,244	33.75%	3
Christian Democratic Party	KrF	10,940	10.19%	1
Centre Party	Sp	7,731	7.20%	0
Liberal Party	V	2,984	2.78%	0
Socialist Left Party	SV	2,741	2.55%	0
Progress Party	FrP	2,139	1.99%	0
New People's Party	DNF	1,134	1.06%	0
Red Electoral Alliance	RV	361	0.34%	0
Communist Party of Norway	K	157	0.15%	0
Single Person's Party		109	0.10%	0
Free Elected Representatives		59	0.05%	0
Norwegian Democratic Party		44	0.04%	0
Valid votes		107,400	100.00%	7
Rejected votes		154	0.14%	
Total polled		107,554	84.80%	
Registered electors		126,829		

The following candidates were elected: Alf Martin Bjørnø (Ap); Petter Furberg (Ap); Thor Knudsen (H); Astrid Murberg Martinsen (Ap); Åge Ramberg (KrF); Karen Sogn (H); and Odd Vattekar (H).

===== 1973 =====
Results of the 1973 parliamentary election held on 9 and 10 September 1973:

Party		Votes	%	Seats
Labour Party	Ap	33,750	33.84%	3
Conservative Party	H	26,441	26.51%	2
Centre Party and Liberal Party	Sp-V	10,598	10.63%	1
Christian Democratic Party	KrF	10,287	10.31%	1
Socialist Electoral League	SV	8,919	8.94%	0
Anders Lange's Party	ALP	6,591	6.61%	0
New People's Party	DNF	2,439	2.45%	0
Red Electoral Alliance	RV	296	0.30%	0
Single Person's Party		266	0.27%	0
Norwegian Democratic Party		143	0.14%	0
Valid votes		99,730	100.00%	7
Rejected votes		238	0.24%	
Total polled		99,968	81.83%	
Registered electors		122,168		

The following candidates were elected: Torgeir Andersen (H); Alf Martin Bjørnø (Ap); Aslaug Fadum (Sp-V); Petter Furberg (Ap); Astrid Murberg Martinsen (Ap); Åge Ramberg (KrF); and Odd Vattekar (H).

==== 1960s ====
===== 1969 =====
Results of the 1969 parliamentary election held on 7 and 8 September 1969:

Party		Votes	%	Seats
Labour Party	Ap	43,781	44.31%	4
Conservative Party	H	29,647	30.00%	2
Centre Party and Christian Democratic Party	Sp-KrF	13,854	14.02%	1
Liberal Party	V	8,290	8.39%	0
Socialist People's Party	SF	2,602	2.63%	0
Communist Party of Norway	K	641	0.65%	0
Valid votes		98,815	100.00%	7
Rejected votes		178	0.18%	
Total polled		98,993	85.42%	
Registered electors		115,894		

The following candidates were elected: Torgeir Andersen (H); Theodor Dyring (Sp-KrF); Petter Furberg (Ap); Willy Jansson (Ap); Asbjørn Lillås (Ap); Astrid Murberg Martinsen (Ap); and Odd Vattekar (H).

===== 1965 =====
Results of the 1965 parliamentary election held on 12 and 13 September 1965:

Party		Votes	%	Seats
Labour Party	Ap	39,750	42.43%	3
Conservative Party	H	30,172	32.21%	2
Centre Party	Sp	10,057	10.74%	1
Liberal Party	V	8,502	9.08%	1
Socialist People's Party	SF	4,528	4.83%	0
Communist Party of Norway	K	666	0.71%	0
Valid votes		93,675	100.00%	7
Rejected votes		319	0.34%	
Total polled		93,994	87.63%	
Registered electors		107,263		

The following candidates were elected: Johan Andersen (Ap); Theodor Dyring (Sp); Gunvor Katharina Eker (Ap); Borghild Bondevik Haga (V); Asbjørn Lillås (Ap); Rolf Schjerven (H); and Johan Møller Warmedal (H).

===== 1961 =====
Results of the 1961 parliamentary election held on 11 September 1961:

Party		Votes	%	Seats
Labour Party	Ap	44,108	46.64%	4
Conservative Party	H	28,885	30.55%	3
Centre Party	Sp	7,226	7.64%	0
Liberal Party	V	6,569	6.95%	0
Christian Democratic Party	KrF	5,950	6.29%	0
Communist Party of Norway	K	1,825	1.93%	0
Valid votes		94,563	100.00%	7
Rejected votes		444	0.47%	
Total polled		95,007	82.92%	
Registered electors		114,574		

The following candidates were elected: Johan Andersen (Ap), 44,108 votes; Gunvor Katharina Eker (Ap), 44,104 votes; Asbjørn Lillås (Ap), 44,108 votes; Rolf Schjerven (H), 28,881 votes; Bjarne Støtvig (H), 28,885 votes; Reidar Strømdahl (Ap), 44,108 votes; and Johan Møller Warmedal (H), 28,879 votes.

==== 1950s ====
===== 1957 =====
Results of the 1957 parliamentary election held on 7 October 1957:

Party		Votes	%	Seats
Labour Party	Ap	43,838	47.78%	4
Conservative Party and Farmers' Party	H-Bp	31,890	34.76%	3
Liberal Party	V	8,226	8.97%	0
Christian Democratic Party	KrF	6,172	6.73%	0
Communist Party of Norway	K	1,622	1.77%	0
Valid votes		91,748	100.00%	7
Rejected votes		470	0.51%	
Total polled		92,218	82.54%	
Registered electors		111,721		

The following candidates were elected: Johan Andersen (Ap); Torgeir Andreas Berge (Ap); Claudia Olsen (H-Bp); Bjarne Støtvig (H-Bp); Reidar Strømdahl (Ap); Oscar Torp (Ap); and Johan Møller Warmedal (H-Bp).

===== 1953 =====
Results of the 1953 parliamentary election held on 12 October 1953:

Party		Votes	%	Seats
Labour Party	Ap	41,628	46.26%	4
Conservative Party	H	26,580	29.53%	3
Liberal Party	V	7,089	7.88%	0
Farmers' Party	Bp	6,557	7.29%	0
Christian Democratic Party	KrF	5,773	6.41%	0
Communist Party of Norway	K	2,369	2.63%	0
Valid votes		89,996	100.00%	7
Rejected votes		558	0.62%	
Total polled		90,554	82.94%	
Registered electors		109,181		

The following candidates were elected: Johan Andersen (Ap); Torgeir Andreas Berge (Ap); Sigurd Lersbryggen (H); Claudia Olsen (H); Reidar Strømdahl (Ap); Oscar Torp (Ap); and Johan Møller Warmedal (H).

==== 1940s ====
===== 1949 =====
Results of the 1949 parliamentary election held on 10 October 1949:

Party		Votes	%	Seats
Labour Party	Ap	26,077	43.31%	2
Conservative Party	H	17,442	28.97%	1
Liberal Party and Farmers' Party	V-Bp	10,983	18.24%	1
Christian Democratic Party	KrF	4,050	6.73%	0
Communist Party of Norway	K	1,476	2.45%	0
Society Party	Samfp	189	0.31%	0
Valid votes		60,217	100.00%	4
Rejected votes		379	0.63%	
Total polled		60,596	83.74%	
Registered electors		72,360		

The following candidates were elected: Torgeir Andreas Berge (Ap); Karl Johan Edvardsen (V-Bp); Sigurd Lersbryggen (H); and Reidar Strømdahl (Ap).

===== 1945 =====
Results of the 1945 parliamentary election held on 8 October 1945:

Party		Party			List Alliance		
Party		Votes	%	Seats	Votes	%	Seats
Labour Party	Ap	20,292	41.04%	3	20,292	41.04%	2
Conservative Party	H	13,464	27.23%	1	18,919	38.27%	2
Farmers' Party	Bp	5,457	11.04%	0	18,919	38.27%	2
Liberal Party	V	6,659	13.47%	0	6,659	13.47%	0
Communist Party of Norway	K	3,571	7.22%	0	3,571	7.22%	0
Valid votes		49,443	100.00%	4	49,441	100.00%	4
Rejected votes		476	0.95%				
Total polled		49,919	75.63%				
Registered electors		66,005					

As the list alliance was entitled to more seats contesting as an alliance than it was contesting as individual parties, the distribution of seats was as list alliance votes. The H-Bp list alliance's additional seat was allocated to the Conservative Party.

The following candidates were elected: Frithjof Bettum (H); Eivind Kristoffer Eriksen (Ap); Laurits Grønland (Ap); and Sigurd Lersbryggen (H).

==== 1930s ====
===== 1936 =====
Results of the 1936 parliamentary election held on 19 October 1936:

Party		Party			List Alliance		
Party		Votes	%	Seats	Votes	%	Seats
Conservative Party	H	16,964	36.20%	2	22,418	47.89%	2
Farmers' Party	Bp	5,501	11.74%	0	22,418	47.89%	2
Labour Party	Ap	16,404	35.01%	2	16,404	35.04%	2
Liberal Party	V	6,869	14.66%	0	6,869	14.67%	0
Society Party	Samfp	632	1.35%	0	632	1.35%	0
Nasjonal Samling	NS	486	1.04%	0	486	1.04%	0
Wild Votes		1	0.00%	0	1	0.00%	0
Valid votes		46,857	100.00%	4	46,810	100.00%	4
Rejected votes		542	1.14%				
Total polled		47,399	81.67%				
Registered electors		58,040					

As the list alliance was not entitled to more seats contesting as an alliance than it was contesting as individual parties, the distribution of seats was as party votes.

The following candidates were elected: Laurits Grønland (Ap); Johan Mathiassen (Ap); P. Irgens Odberg(H); and Nils Jacob Schjerven (H).

===== 1933 =====
Results of the 1933 parliamentary election held on 16 October 1933:

Party		Party			List Alliance		
Party		Votes	%	Seats	Votes	%	Seats
Vestfold Civic Assembly Party (Conservative Party)	BS	13,379	34.80%	2	18,445	48.04%	2
Farmers' Party	Bp	5,116	13.31%	0	18,445	48.04%	2
Labour Party	Ap	11,544	30.03%	1	11,544	30.07%	1
Liberal Party	V	6,397	16.64%	1	6,397	16.66%	1
Nasjonal Samling–Villagers	NS-B	1,656	4.31%	0	1,656	4.31%	0
Society Party	Samfp	207	0.54%	0	207	0.54%	0
Communist Party of Norway	K	145	0.38%	0	145	0.38%	0
Valid votes		38,444	100.00%	4	38,394	100.00%	4
Rejected votes		235	0.61%				
Total polled		38,679	71.72%				
Registered electors		53,927					

As the list alliance was not entitled to more seats contesting as an alliance than it was contesting as individual parties, the distribution of seats was as party votes.

The following candidates were elected: Svend Foyn Bruun Sr. (BS); Johan Mathiassen (Ap); Nils Jacob Schjerven (BS); and Magnus Tvedten (V).

===== 1930 =====
Results of the 1930 parliamentary election held on 20 October 1930:

Party		Votes	%	Seats
Vestfold Civic Assembly Party (Conservative Party)	BS	16,801	46.14%	2
Labour Party	Ap	7,667	21.06%	1
Liberal Party	V	5,981	16.43%	1
Farmers' Party	Bp	5,962	16.37%	0
Valid votes		36,411	100.00%	4
Rejected votes		555	1.50%	
Total polled		36,966	74.22%	
Registered electors		49,803		

The following candidates were elected: Svend Foyn Bruun Sr. (BS); Johan Mathiassen (Ap); Nils Jacob Schjerven (BS); and Magnus Tvedten (V).

==== 1920s ====
===== 1927 =====
Results of the 1927 parliamentary election held on 17 October 1927:

Party		Votes	%	Seats
Conservative Party and Free-minded Liberal Party	H-FV	11,248	39.72%	2
Labour Party	Ap	7,928	28.00%	1
Farmers' Party	Bp	5,119	18.08%	1
Liberal Party	V	4,022	14.20%	0
Valid votes		28,317	100.00%	4
Rejected votes		341	1.19%	
Total polled		28,658	61.87%	
Registered electors		46,316		

The following candidates were elected: Svend Foyn Bruun Sr. (H-FV); Hans Kristian Sørensen Kaldager (H-FV); Johan Mathiassen (Ap); and Richard Nilsen Tvedten (Bp).

===== 1924 =====
Results of the 1924 parliamentary election held on 21 October 1924:

Party		Votes	%	Seats
Conservative Party and Free-minded Liberal Party	H-FV	13,459	49.46%	3
Farmers' Party	Bp	4,349	15.98%	1
Liberal Party	V	3,871	14.22%	0
Labour Party	Ap	3,498	12.85%	0
Social Democratic Labour Party of Norway	S	1,808	6.64%	0
Communist Party of Norway	K	227	0.83%	0
Wild Votes		2	0.01%	0
Valid votes		27,214	100.00%	4
Rejected votes		403	1.46%	
Total polled		27,617	63.88%	
Registered electors		43,234		

The following candidates were elected: Svend Foyn Bruun Sr. (H-FV); Hans Kristian Sørensen Kaldager (H-FV); Nils Jacob Schjerven (H-FV); and Richard Nilsen Tvedten (Bp).

===== 1921 =====
Results of the 1921 parliamentary election held on 24 October 1921:

Party		Votes	%	Seats
Conservative Party and Free-minded Liberal Party	H-FV	12,588	52.24%	3
Liberal Party	V	3,362	13.95%	1
Norwegian Farmers' Association	L	3,362	13.95%	0
Labour Party	Ap	3,289	13.65%	0
Social Democratic Labour Party of Norway	S	1,486	6.17%	0
Wild Votes		11	0.05%	0
Valid votes		24,098	100.00%	4
Rejected votes		358	1.46%	
Total polled		24,456	59.79%	
Registered electors		40,902		

The following candidates were elected: Martin Olsen Nalum (V); Ole Olsen Nauen (H-FV); Nils Jacob Schjerven (H-FV); and Haldor Virik (H-FV).

On 24 January 1922 the Storting voted to re-run of the election in Borre, Brunlanes, Fredriksvern, Hedrum, Lardal, Nøtterøy, Sande, Sandeherad, Sem, Skoger, Stokke, Svelvik, Tjølling, Tjøme and Vaale. Results of the election held on 13 March 1922:

Party		Votes	%	Seats
Conservative Party and Free-minded Liberal Party	H-FV	13,097	49.10%	3
Liberal Party	V	4,533	16.99%	1
Norwegian Farmers' Association	L	4,081	15.30%	0
Labour Party	Ap	3,923	14.71%	0
Social Democratic Labour Party of Norway	S	1,048	3.93%	0
Wild Votes		-6	-0.02%	0
Valid votes		26,676	100.00%	4
Rejected votes		352	1.30%	
Total polled		27,028	66.08%	
Registered electors		40,902		

The following candidates were elected: Martin Olsen Nalum (V); Ole Olsen Nauen (H-FV); Nils Jacob Schjerven (H-FV); and Haldor Virik (H-FV).
