= Standing Committee on Family and Cultural Affairs =

The Standing Committee on Family and Cultural Affairs (Norwegian: Familie- og kulturkomiteen) is a standing committee of the Parliament of Norway. It is responsible for policies relating to families, children and youth, gender equality, consumer affairs and cultural affairs. It corresponds to the Ministry of Culture and the Ministry of Children and Equality. The committee has 10 members and is chaired by Svein Harberg of the Conservative Party.

== Members 2009–13 ==
Representative	Party	Position
Svein Harberg	Conservative	Chair
Geir Bekkevold	Christian Democratic	First deputy chair
Rigmor Aasrud	Labour	Second deputy chair
Hege Haukeland Liadal	Labour	
Kårstein Eidem Løvaas	Conservative	
Sonja Mandt	Labour	
Arild Stokkan-Grande	Labour	
Morten Stordalen	Progress	
Ib Thomsen	Progress	
Mette Tønder	Conservative	
