= Torgeir =

Torgeir is a given name. Notable people with the name include:

- Arvid Torgeir Lie (born 1938), Norwegian poet, writer of short stories and translator
- Torgeir Andersen (born 1916), Norwegian politician for the Conservative Party
- Torgeir Anderssen-Rysst (1888–1958), Norwegian politician for the Liberal Party
- Torgeir Andreas Berge (1897–1973), Norwegian farmer and politician for the Labour Party from Sandar
- Torgeir Børven, Norwegian football forward currently playing for Brann
- Torgeir Bjørn (born 1964), retired Norwegian cross country skier
- Torgeir Bjarmann (born 1968), former Norwegian footballer
- Torgeir Brandtzæg (born 1941), Norwegian ski jumper who competed between 1962 and 1965
- Torgeir Bryn (born 1964), professional basketball player from Norway
- Torgeir Byrknes, Norwegian DJ and producer known by his stage name TeeBee
- Torgeir Garmo (born 1941), Norwegian politician for the Liberal Party
- Torgeir Micaelsen (born 1979), Norwegian politician for the Labour Party
- Torgeir Schjerven (born 1954), Norwegian author and lyric poet
- Torgeir Svendsen (1910–1981), Norwegian politician for the Labour Party
- Torgeir Toppe, Norwegian sprint canoeist who competed in the early to mid-1990s
- Torgeir Trældal (born 1965), Norwegian politician and member of parliament from representing Nordland for the Progress Party

== See also ==
- Tarjei
