= Åge Ramberg =

Norwegian politician

Åge Ramberg (28 September 1921, in Larvik – 24 August 1991) was a Norwegian politician for the Christian Democratic Party.

He worked as a teacher, having graduated as cand.real. from the University of Oslo in 1948 and spent the first year as a teacher in Sarpsborg Municipality. He was taught and was involved in local politics in Porsgrunn Municipality from 1951 to 1959, Sandar Municipality from 1963 to 1967 and Sandefjord Municipality from 1967 to 1973—teaching at Sandefjord Upper Secondary School from 1959 to 1985. He chaired Vestfold Christian Democratic Party from 1982 to 1986.

He was elected to the Parliament of Norway from Vestfold in 1973, and was re-elected on two occasions, serving until 1989. After chairing the Standing Committee on Administration in his middle term, his last term was spent as secretary of the Standing Committee on Scrutiny and member of the Standing Committee on Defence.

He was a Pentecostal. In 1994, his son Per Ramberg became mayor of Sandefjord, with another son Ivar Ramberg becoming deputy mayor.
