= Svein Flåtten =

Norwegian politician

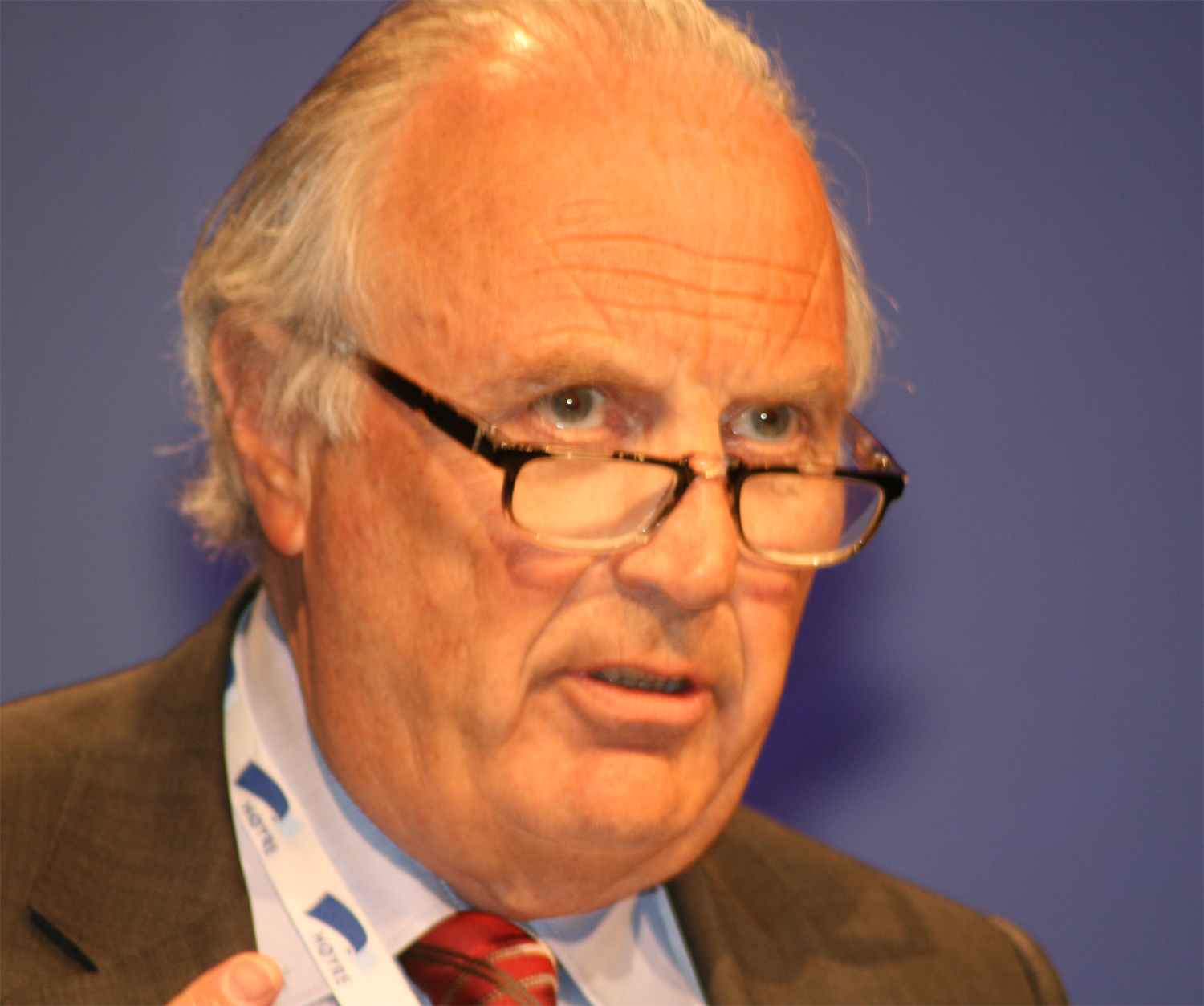
Svein Flåtten

Svein Flåtten (born 14 October 1944 in Andebu) is a Norwegian politician for the Conservative Party.

He was elected to the Norwegian Parliament from Vestfold in 2001, and has been re-elected on one occasion.

Flåtten was a member of the executive committee of the municipal council of Sandefjord Municipality from 1995 to 2001.
