= Mette Tønder =

Norwegian politician (born 1969)

Mette Tønder (born 3 November 1969) is a Norwegian politician for the Conservative Party.

She served as a deputy representative to the Parliament of Norway from Akershus during the term 2009–2013. She was the mayor of Nittedal from 2007 to 2011. In 2012 she became a member of Akershus University Hospital.

In 2013 she was elected as a full member of Parliament. She served as a member of the Standing Committee on Family and Cultural Affairs.
