= Arctic Military Environmental Cooperation =

Trilateral environmental cooperation

The Arctic Military Environmental Cooperation Program (AMEC) was established as a trilateral environmental cooperation forum among the U.S., Russia, and Norway, aiming to mitigate environmental risks originating from military activities in the Arctic—particularly from aging infrastructure and hazardous waste on military sites.

The collective agreement was launched in September 1996. The agreement was signed by defense ministers of each country: U.S. Secretary of Defense William J. Perry, Norwegian Minister of Defence Jorgen Kosmo, and Russian Federation Minister of Defense Igor Rodionov. AMEC operated from 1996 to 2006 which is when the United States stopped funding the program.

== Projects ==
The DOD Environment, Safety & Occupational Health Network and Information Exchange (DENIX) maintains records of the projects that were established under AMEC. There are eight programs listed on their website with downloadable PDF's that summarize each mission.

- AMEC 1.1 Development of a prototype container for interim storage of spent nuclear fuel.
- AMEC 1.2 Development of technology for treatment of liquid radioactive waste.
- AMEC 1.3 Review and implementation of technology for solid radioactive waste volume reduction.
- AMEC 1.4 Review of technologies and procedures for interim storage of solid radioactive waste and development of a storage facility.
- AMEC 1.5 Cooperation on Radiation and Environmental Safety.
- AMEC 2.1 Remediation of hazardous waste sites on military bases.
- AMEC 2.2 Review and implementation of clean ship technologies.
- AMEC 2.4 Storage Battery Disposal and Recycling Facility (Record of Meeting, 19 Feb. 03)
