= Per Erik Monsen =

Norwegian teacher and politician

Per Erik Monsen (18 April 1946 – 16 February 2008) was a Norwegian teacher and politician for the Progress Party.

Born in Sandefjord, Monsen graduated from teacher's college in 1977 and worked at Fevang School from 1978 to 1997. He was a member of the executive committee of the municipal council of Sandefjord Municipality from 1987 to 1997, serving as deputy mayor in 1990–1994 and 1995–1997. He chaired the local party chapter from 1994 to 1997. In 2007 he was again elected to the municipal council.

He was elected to the Parliament of Norway from Vestfold in 1997, and was re-elected on one occasion, serving both terms in the Standing Committee on Finance and Economic Affairs.

Monsen died at the age of 61, after a heart attack three weeks earlier.
