= Julie Estdahl Stuestøl =

Norwegian politician (born 1983)

Member of the Storting
- Incumbent
- Assumed office 1 October 2025
- Constituency: Vestfold

Personal details
- Born: 14 September 1983 (age 42)
- Party: Green Party

Julie Estdahl Stuestøl (born 14 September 1983) is a Norwegian politician who was elected member of the Storting in 2025. She is the group leader of the Green Party in the city council of Tønsberg.
