= Ernst Wroldsen =

Norwegian politician (1944–2023)

- Born: 4 December 1944; Langesund, German-occupied Norway
- Died: 16 August 2023 (aged 78)
- Occupation: Politician
- Political party: Labour Party

Ernst Wroldsen (4 December 1944 – 16 August 2023) was a Norwegian politician for the Labour Party. He was a member of the Storting from 1981 to 1993.

== Biography ==
Wroldsen was born in Langesund to Valter Johan Wroldsen and Dagny Agathe Kristensen. He was elected representative to the Storting from the constituency of Vestfold for the period 1981–1985 for the Labour Party, and reelected for the period 1985–1989, and again for the period 1989–1993.

Ernst Wroldsen died on 16 August 2023, at the age of 78.
