= Lene Westgaard-Halle =

Norwegian politician

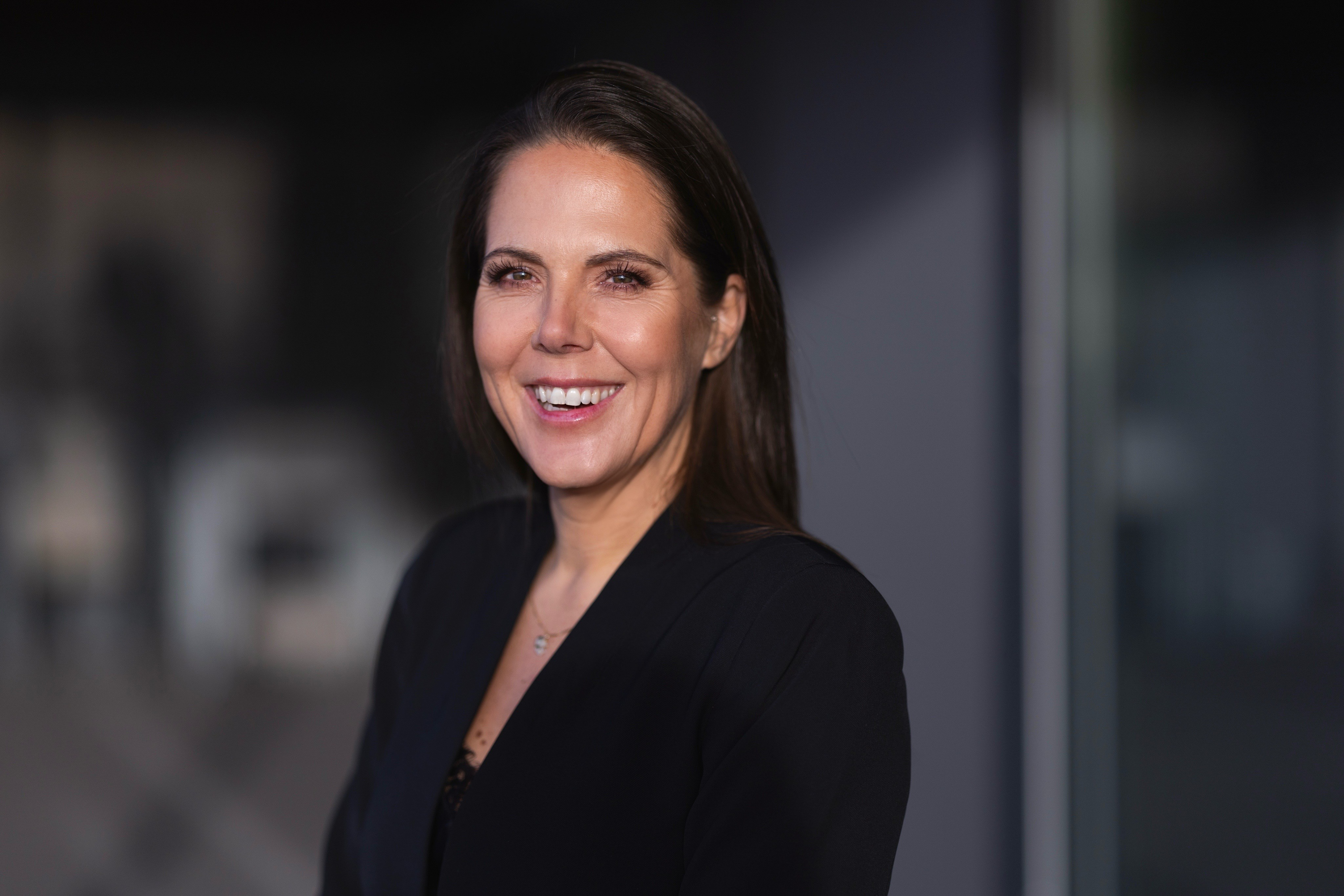

Member of the Storting
- In office 1 October 2017 – 30 September 2025
- Constituency: Vestfold

Deputy Member of the Storting
- In office 1 October 2005 – 30 September 2009
- Constituency: Buskerud

Personal details
- Born: 4 July 1979 (age 47) Oslo, Norway
- Party: Conservative
- Parent: Dag Lars Westgaard (father)

Lene Camilla Westgaard-Halle (born 4 July 1979, Oslo) is a Norwegian political scientist from Drammen, a former politician for the Conservative Party and currently the CEO of Fritzøe Energi.

== Early life and education ==
Westgaard-Halle grew up on Åskollen in Drammen Municipality. She was an active alpinist in Drammen Slalom Club for many years and is the daughter of national team alpinist Dag Lars Westgaard. She graduated from Hawera High School in New Zealand in 1997, and Drammen Gymnas in 1998. She studied political science at the University of Oslo and took subjects at the University of Oxford.

== Career ==
=== Local politics ===
Westgaard-Halle became active in politics at the upper secondary school, and was a city council candidate for the first time in 1999. She led Drammen European Youth from 2001 to 2003, Buskerud Young Conservatives from 2002 to 2004 and the Moderate group in the Student Parliament at the University of Oslo from 2005 to 2007. She also sat in the leadership of the student parliament. She sat for 10 years as a representative on the municipal council of Drammen Municipality and as a member of the chairmanship and school committee, and in Buskerud county council where she was a member of the main committee for education and the county committee. She was for several years a member of Drammen Conservative's main board and the board of Buskerud Conservatives. Locally she has been a member of the municipal council of Drammen Municipality and Buskerud county council, as well as the municipal council of Larvik Municipality and Vestfold county council where she was the leader of the Conservatives.

She has been a member of several Executive Boards, amongst them, the Executive Boards of Buskerud Hospital, and the executive board of the University of Oslo.

=== Parliament ===
She was a member of the Storting, the Norwegian parliament, from 2017 to 2025, representing VestfoldShe also represented Buskerud as a deputy member from 2005 to 2009.

In April 2024, she announced that she wouldn't seek re-election at the 2025 election.

On 9 April 2021, marking 81 years since the German occupation of Norway, Westgaard-Halle supported minister of culture Abid Raja's criticism of Carl Bildt's claiming the Swedish defence forces were stronger than those of Norway and Denmark. She stated Sweden looked away and let "Hitler invade Norway", further stating that she hopes that "this is not the way Sweden remembers the most horrible day in Norwegian history". She was supported by Progress Party member of parliament Erlend Wiborg, who said that "I think Margaret Thatcher summarised your participation in the war pretty well".

In January 2022, she expressed criticism against the state broadcaster NRK after they listed fewer positions previously held by Vice Governor of the Norwegian Central Bank Ida Wolden Bache compared to NATO Secretary-General Jens Stoltenberg.

She is currently the CEO of the Norwegian energy company, Fritzøe Energi.
