= Maria Aasen-Svensrud =

Norwegian politician

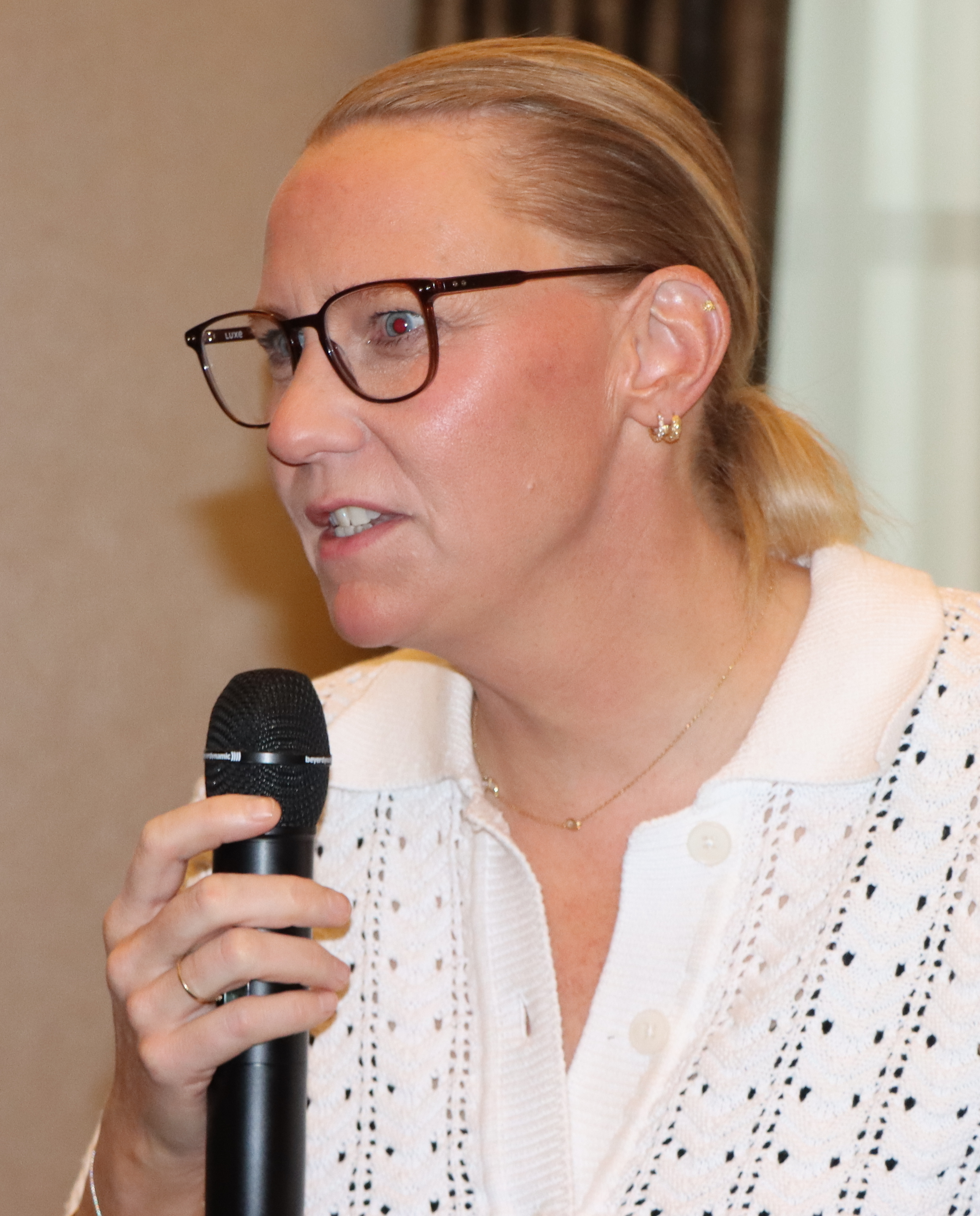
- Aasen-Svensrud in 2026
- Born: 22 February 1980 (age 46); Horten Municipality, Norway
- Other name: Maria-Karine Aasen-Svensrud
- Education: Vestfold University College; University of Stavanger
- Occupation: Politician
- Political party: Labour Party

Maria-Karine Aasen-Svensrud (born 22 February 1980) is a Norwegian politician for the Labour Party. She was elected representative to the Storting from Vestfold for the period 2017–2021, and re-elected in 2021.

== Early and personal life ==
Aasen-Svensrud was born in Horten Municipality on 22 February 1980, a daughter of farmer Carl-Henrik Aasen and Guri Mette Pedersen. She studied sociology and social sciences at the Vestfold University College and the University of Stavanger.

== Political career ==
Aasen-Svensrud was elected to the municipal council of Horten from 2011 to 2019, and was a deputy representative to the Storting from 2013 to 2017. She was elected representative to the Storting from the constituency of Vestfold for the period 2017–2021 for the Labour Party. In the Storting, she was a member of the Standing Committee on Justice from 2017 to 2021. She was re-elected to the Storting for the period 2021–2025, when she was a member of Standing Committee on Justice from 2021 to 2024, and of the Standing Committee on Finance and Economic Affairs from 2024 to 2025.
