= Kårstein Eidem Løvaas =

Norwegian politician (born 1967)

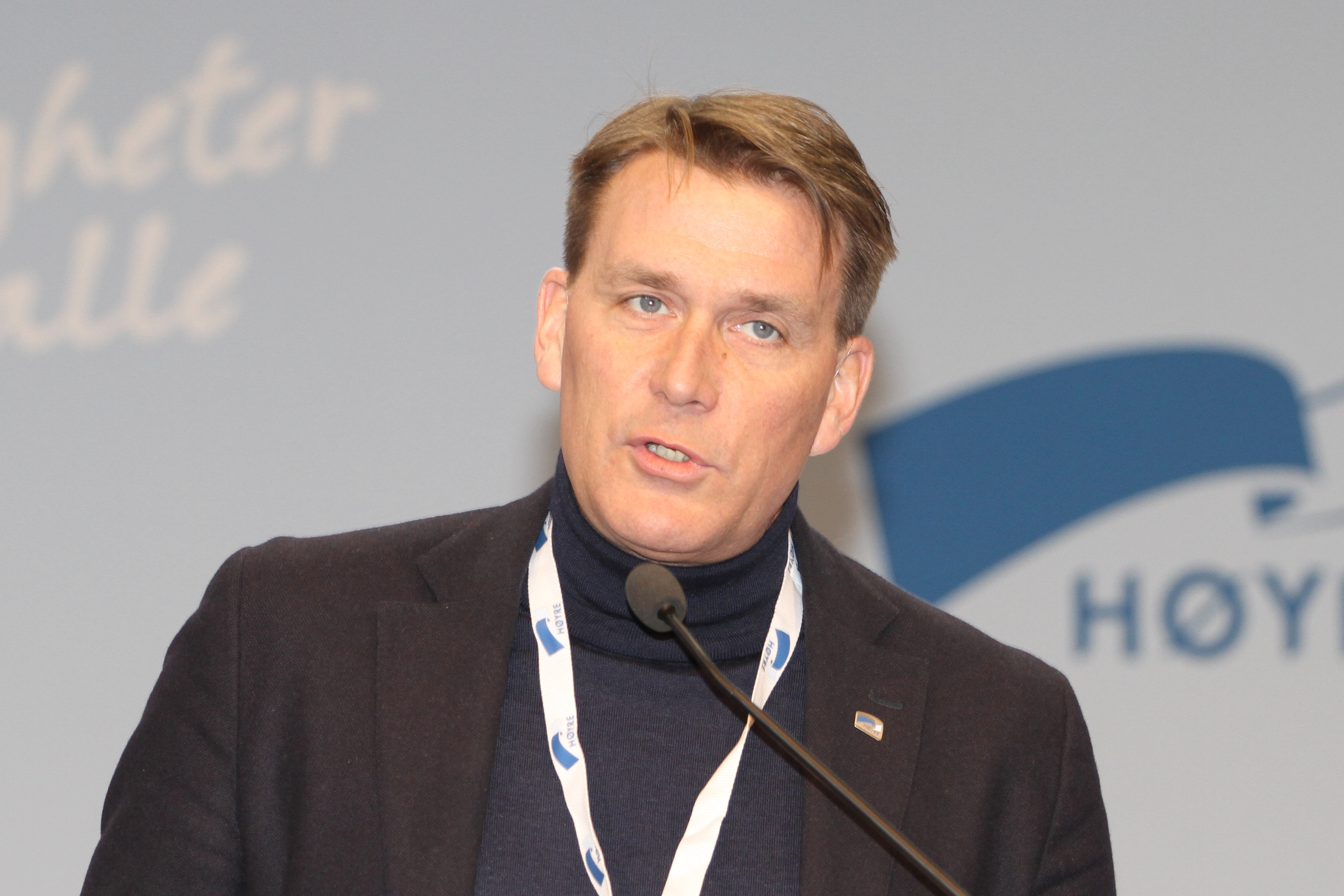
- Born: 10 November 1967 (age 58)
- Occupation: Politician
- Known for: Member of the Storting

Kårstein Eidem Løvaas (born 10 November 1967) is a Norwegian politician for the Conservative Party. He was elected to the Parliament of Norway from Vestfold in 2013 where he is member of the Standing Committee on Family and Cultural Affairs.
