= Kathrine Kleveland =

Norwegian politician (born 1966)

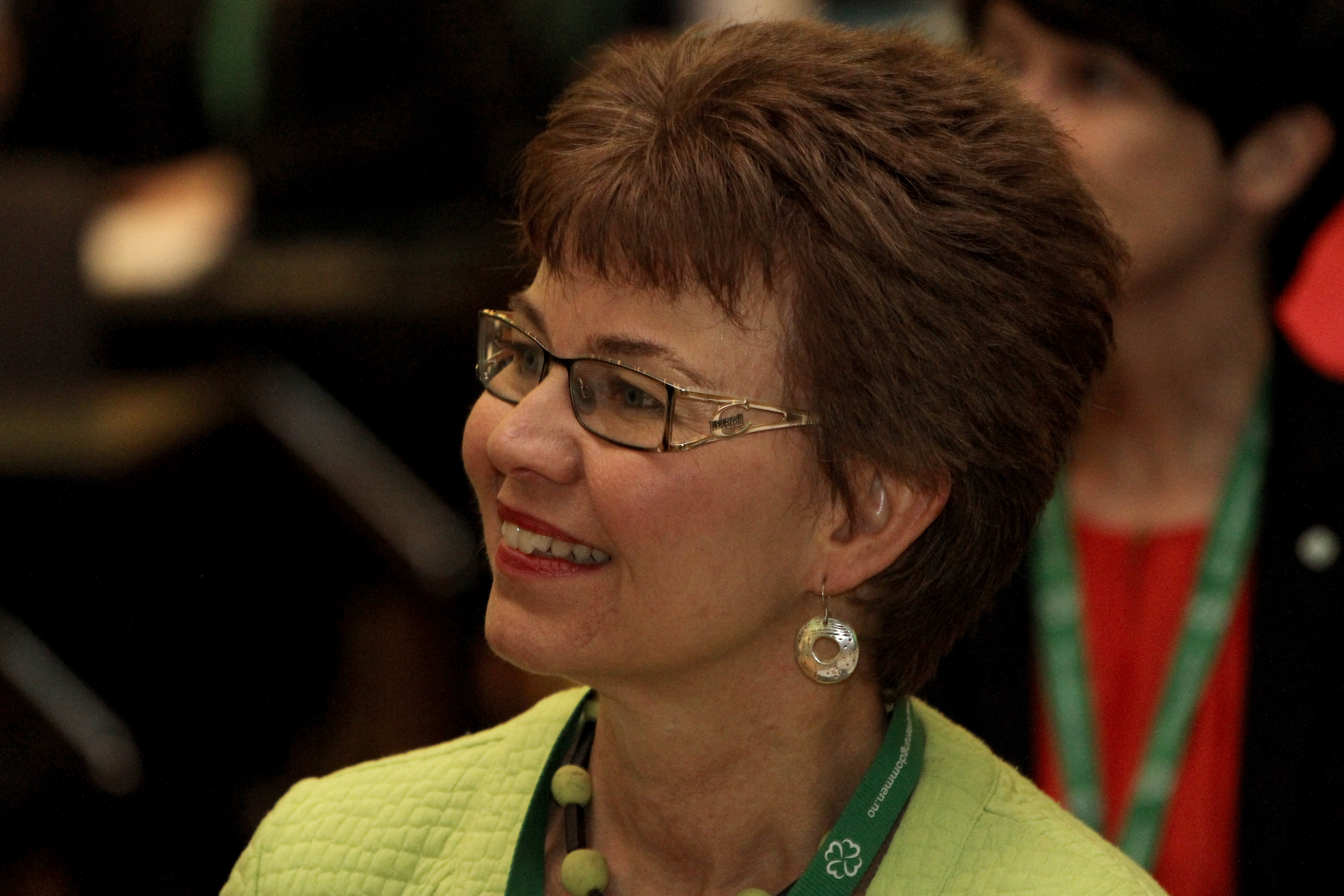
- Born: 7 April 1966 (age 60)
- Occupation: Politician
- Political party: Centre Party

Kathrine Kleveland (born 7 April 1966) is a Norwegian politician for the Centre Party. She has been a member of the Storting since 2021, representing the constituency of Vestfold.

== Biography ==
Kleveland was born on 7 April 1966 to farmer and carpenter Jakob Rønningen and Ellen-Marie Wallumrød.

From 2014 she chaired the organization No to the EU. She was elected representative to the Storting from the constituency of Vestfold for the period 2021–2025, for the Centre Party. In the Storting, she was a member of the Standing Committee on Local Government and Public Administration from 2021 to 2025.
