= Grete Wold =

Norwegian politician (born 1968)

- Born: 15 January 1968 (age 58)
- Occupation: Politician
- Political party: Socialist Left Party

Grete Wold (born 15 January 1968) is a Norwegian politician for the Socialist Left Party. She has been a member of the Storting since 2021.

== Career ==
Born on 15 January 1968, Wold graduated with a bachelor degree from Høgskolen i Nordland in 1993. From 1993 to 2021 she was a social work consultant and eventually section leader in Sandefjord Municipality, in the field of mental health and drug abuse.

She was elected representative to the Storting from the constituency of Vestfold for the period 2021–2025, for the Socialist Left Party.

In the Storting, she is a member of the Standing Committee on Local Government and Public Administration from 2021 to 2025.
