= Steinar Gullvåg =

Norwegian politician (born 1946)

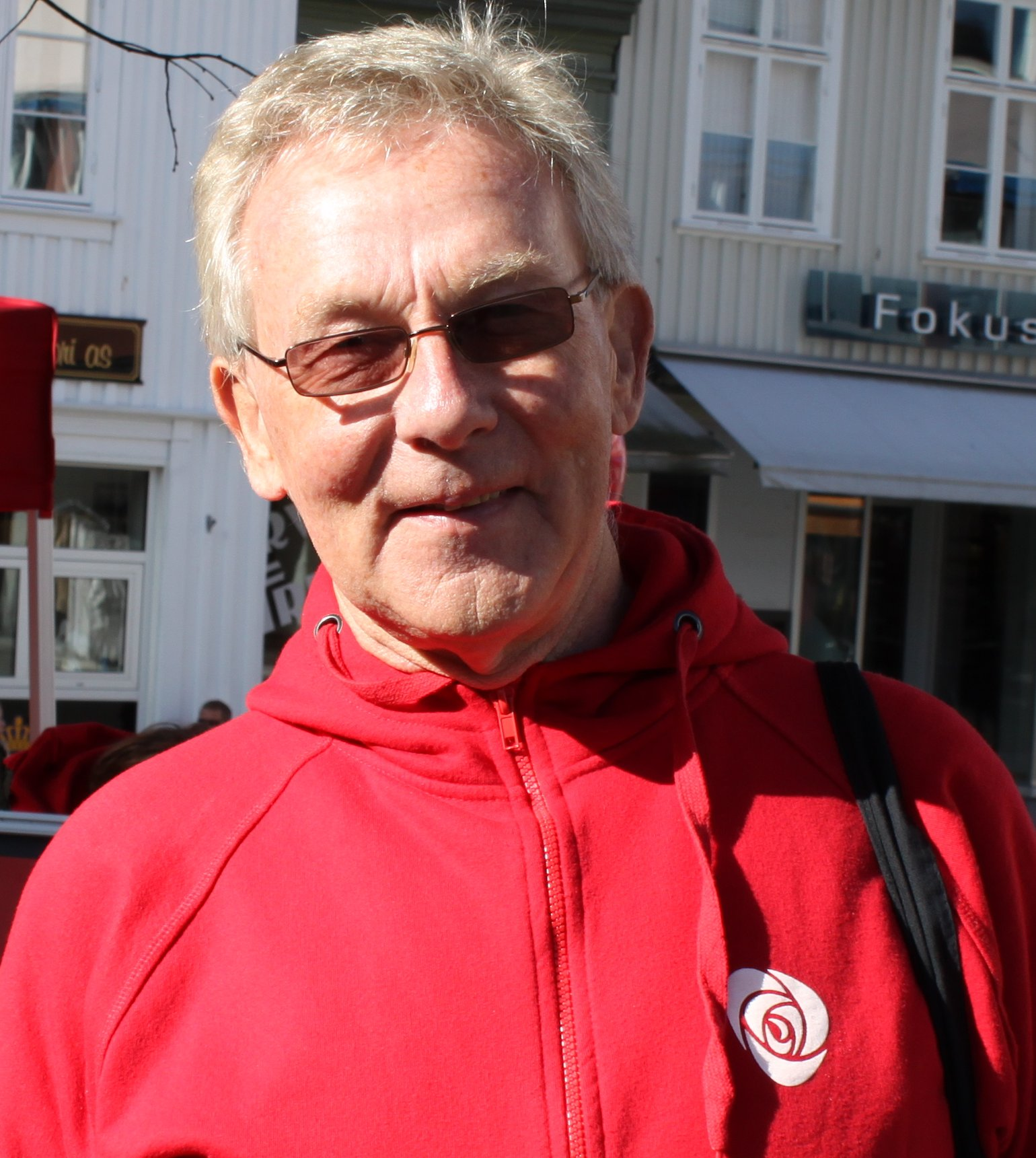
Steinar Gullvåg

Steinar Gullvåg (born 27 October 1946 in Trondheim) is a Norwegian politician for the Labour Party.

He was elected to the Norwegian Parliament from Vestfold in 2005. Gullvåg was a member of the municipal council of Nøtterøy Municipality from 1979 to 1987 and 2003 to 2007.

The son of Eigil Gullvåg, long-time editor of the newspaper Arbeider-Avisa, Steinar Gullvåg originally worked as a journalist, starting in Arbeider-Avisa. He took over as editor-in-chief in Hardanger Folkeblad 1973–1977 and in Vestfold Arbeiderblad 1977–1983. From 1994 to 2005 he was information director of the Directorate of Public Roads.
