= Anne Helen Rui =

Norwegian politician (born 1950)

Anne Helen Rui (born 14 October 1950 in Hedrum) is a Norwegian politician for the Labour Party.

She was elected to the Norwegian Parliament from Vestfold in 1993, and was re-elected on two occasions. She had previously served in the position of deputy representative during the term 1989–1993, but in 1993 during the end of this term she met briefly as a regular representative, covering for Jørgen Kosmo.

Rui was a member of Østfold county council from 1983 to 1987.
