= Karen Sogn =

Norwegian politician

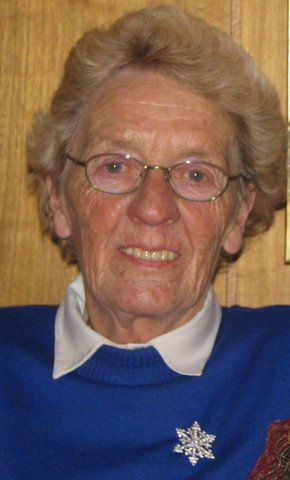
Karen Sogn in 2004

Karen Sogn, née Thaugland (28 April 1931 – 21 October 2013) was a Norwegian politician for the Conservative Party.

She was elected to the Parliament of Norway from Vestfold in 1977, and was re-elected in 1981 to serve until 1985. She had previously served as a deputy representative during the term 1973–1977.

On the local level she was a member of the municipal council of Lardal Municipality from 1967 to 1979, serving as deputy mayor from 1975 to 1977.
