= Alf Martin Bjørnø =

Norwegian politician (1923–1991)

Alf Martin Bjørnø (10 November 1923 – 2 August 1991) was a Norwegian politician for the Labour Party.

He was born in Brunlanes Municipality. He was elected to the Norwegian Parliament from Vestfold in 1973, and was re-elected on two occasions.

On the local level he was a member of the municipal council of Brunlanes Municipality from 1951 to 1975. From 1963 to 1971 he was also a member of Vestfold county council. He chaired the local party chapter from 1966 to 1970.

Outside politics he worked in forestry.
