= Bjørn-Kristian Svendsrud =

Norwegian politician (born 1992)

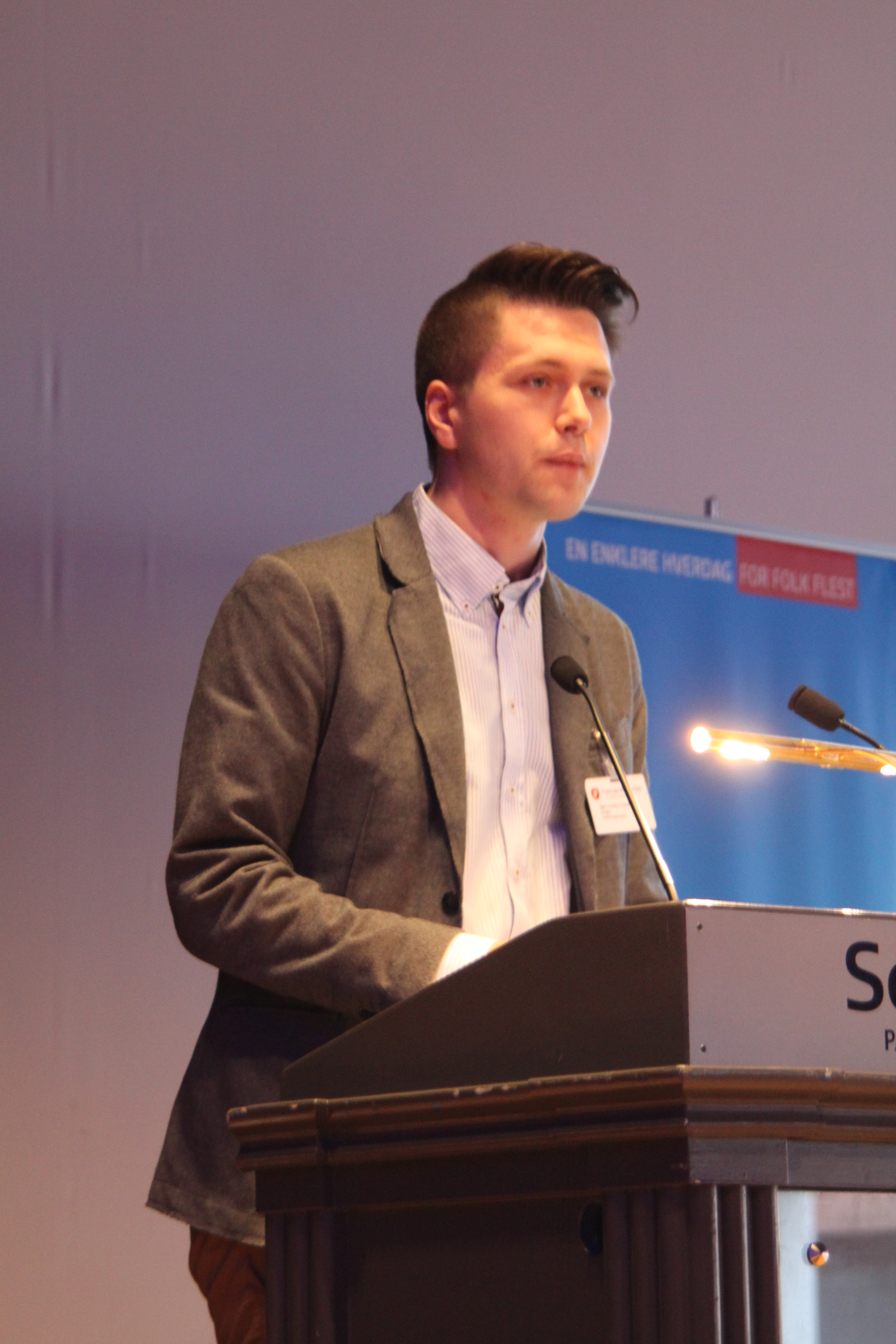
- Svendsrud in 2016

Member of the Storting
- Incumbent
- Assumed office 1 October 2025
- Constituency: Vestfold

Personal details
- Born: 10 September 1992 (age 33)
- Party: Progress Party

Bjørn-Kristian Svendsrud (born 10 September 1992) is a Norwegian politician who was elected member of the Storting in 2025. From 2016 to 2020, he served as chairman of the Progress Party's Youth.
