= Karl Johan Edvardsen =

Norwegian politician

Karl Johan Edvardsen (11 November 1883 – 18 September 1963) was a Norwegian politician for the Liberal Party.

He was born in Brunlanes Municipality. He was elected to the Norwegian Parliament from Vestfold in 1950, but was not re-elected in 1954.

Edvardsen held various positions on the municipal council of Brunlanes Municipality between 1919 and 1951, serving as deputy mayor in the periods 1928–1931 and 1931–1934 and as mayor in 1934–1937, 1937–1945, 1945–1947 and 1947–1951. He was also a member of Vestfold county council.
