= Truls Vasvik =

Norwegian politician

- Born: 28 June 1978 (age 48)
- Education: Strathclyde University
- Occupation: Politician
- Political party: Labour Party

Truls Vasvik (born 28 June 1978) is a Norwegian politician.

== Career ==
Born on 28 June 1978, Vasvik hails from Helgeroa. He received a degree in economics from Strathclyde University in Scotland.

He was elected representative to the Storting from the constituency of Vestfold for the period 2021–2025, for the Labour Party. He was deputy representative to the Storting 2017–2021.
