= Erlend Larsen =

Norwegian politician

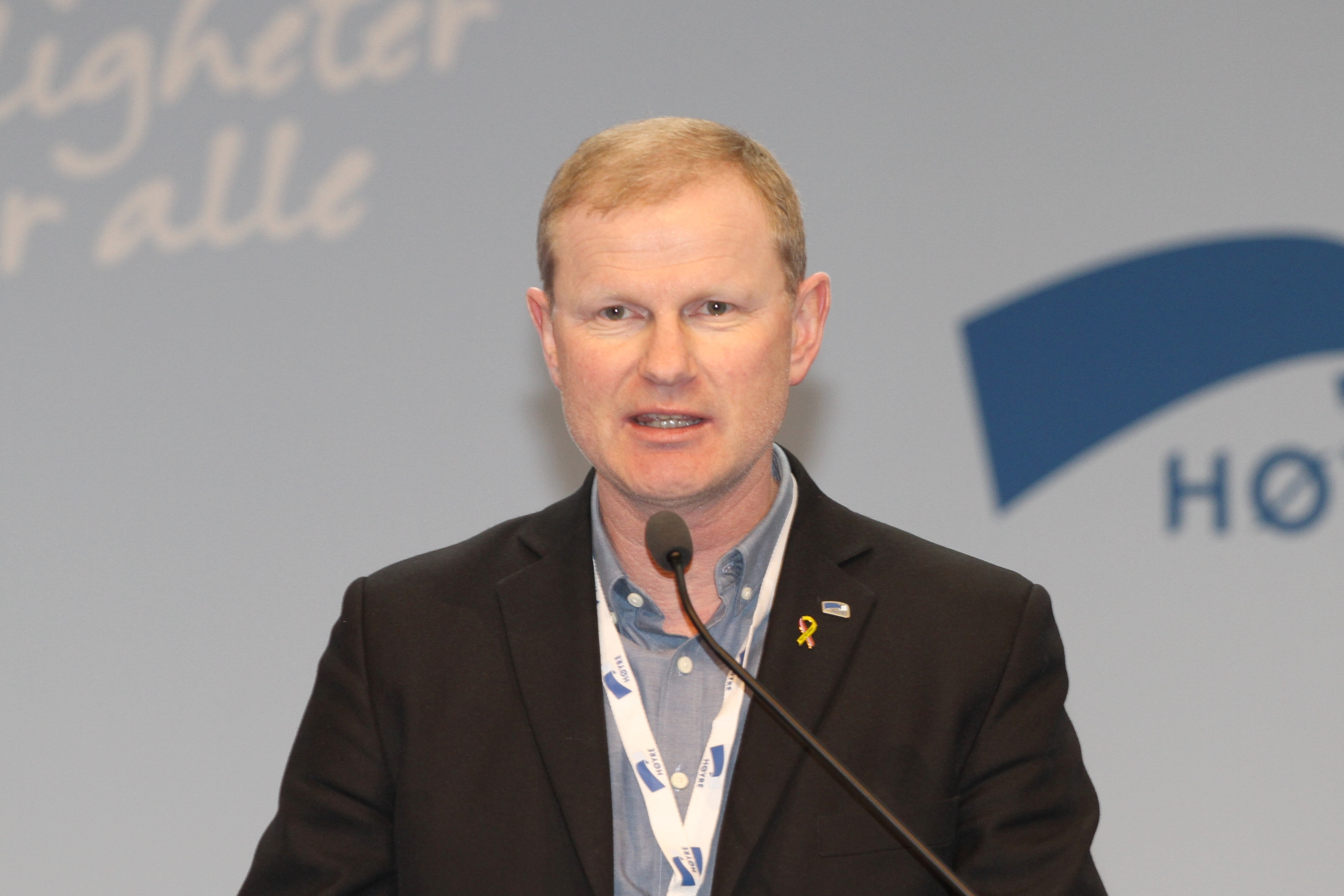
- Larsen in 2017

Member of the Storting
- Incumbent
- Assumed office 1 October 2017
- Constituency: Vestfold

Mayor of Stokke
- In office 14 October 2011 – 31 December 2016
- Preceded by: Nils Ingar Aabol
- Succeeded by: none (Stokke merged into Sandefjord)

Personal details
- Born: 13 October 1965 (age 60) Stokke, Norway
- Occupation: Politician

Erlend Larsen (born 13 October 1965) is a Norwegian pilot, non-fiction writer, and politician for the Conservative Party. He served as mayor in Stokke between 2011 and 2016, and has been a representative of the constituency of Vestfold to the Storting since 2017.

== Personal life ==
Larsen was born in Stokke on 13 October 1965, a son of carpenter Einar Larsen and gardener Jofrid Olga Larsen.

== Career ==
Larsen worked as a pilot from 1994 to 2011. He has also written several non-fiction books, including books related to flying. From 2011 to 2016 he was mayor in Stokke.

He was elected representative to the Storting for the period 2017–2021 for the Conservative Party, re-elected for the period 2021–2025 and once again for the period 2025–2029.
