= Per Ove Width =

Norwegian politician

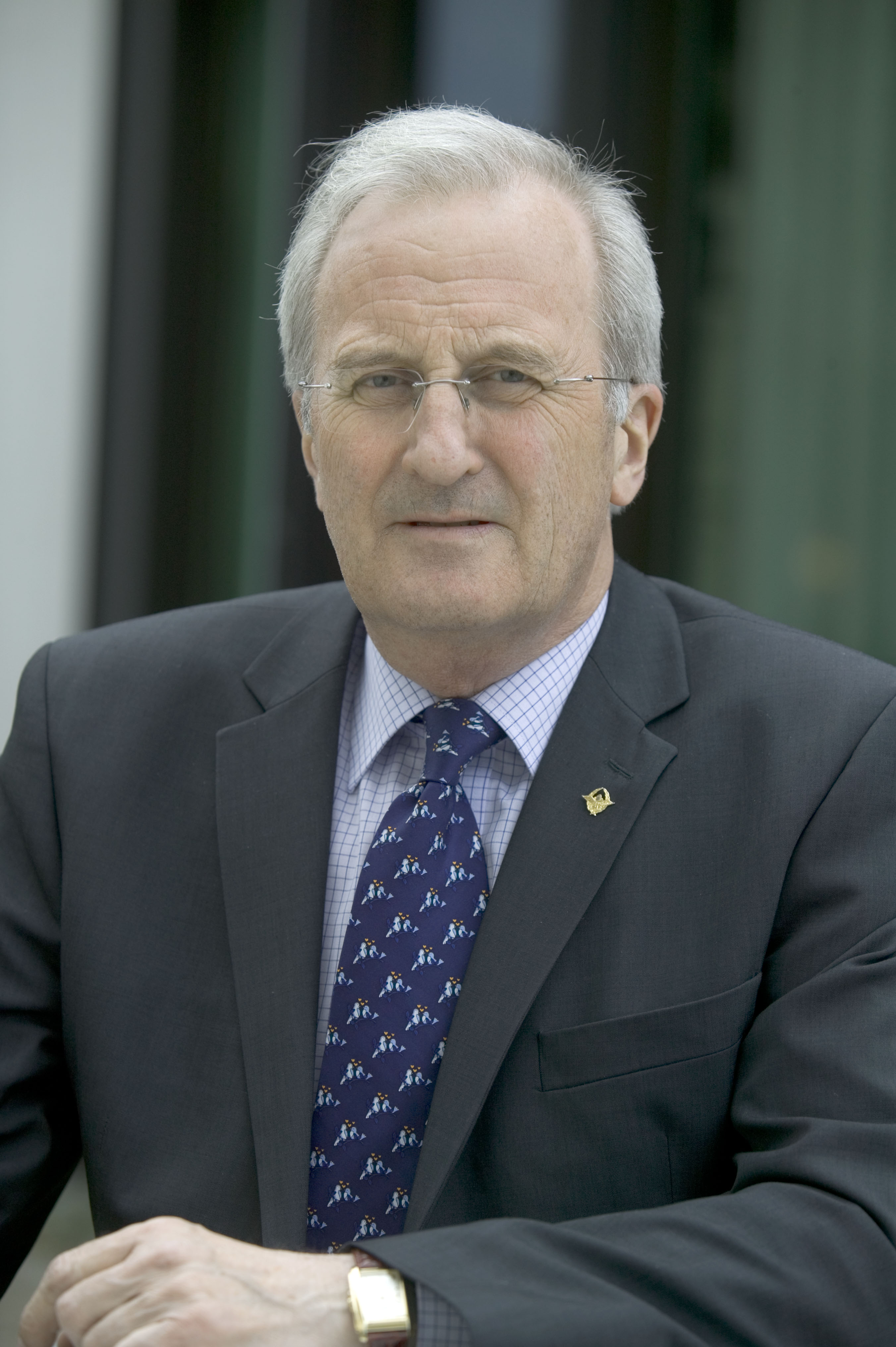
Per Ove Width

Per Ove Width (born 27 March 1939 in Tønsberg) is a Norwegian politician for the Progress Party.

He was elected to the Norwegian Parliament from Vestfold in 1997, and has been re-elected on two occasions. He had previously served in the position of deputy representative during the terms 1989–1993 and 1993–1997.

Width held various positions on the municipal council of Tjøme Municipality from 1983 to 1995, serving as deputy mayor in the periods 1987–1991, 1993–1995 and 2003–2007.
