= Tarjei =

Tarjei is a Norwegian given name. It is a variant of Torgeir, which is derived from the Old Norse þórgeirr, meaning "Thor's spear". Notable people with the name include:

- Tarjei Bø (born 1988), Norwegian biathlete
- Tarjei Dale (born 1983), Norwegian footballer
- Tarjei Sandvik Moe (born 1999), Norwegian actor
- Tarjei Aase Omenås (born 1992), Norwegian footballer
- Tarjei Rygnestad (1954–2013), Norwegian physician
- Tarjei Skarlund (born 1978), Norwegian volleyball player
- Tarjei Strøm (born 1978), Norwegian drummer
- Tarjei Vesaas (1897–1970), Norwegian poet and novelist
