= Anne Grethe Hauan =

Norwegian politician (born 1966)

Member of the Storting
- Incumbent
- Assumed office 2025
- Constituency: Vestfold

Personal details
- Born: 12 August 1966 (age 59)
- Party: Progress

Anne Grethe Hauan (born 12 August 1966) is a Norwegian politician from the Progress Party (FrP). She was elected to the Storting in the 2025 Norwegian parliamentary election.

== See also ==
- List of members of the Storting, 2025–2029
