= Ole Johs. Brunæs =

Norwegian politician (1936–2019)

Ole Johs. Brunæs (born Ole Johannes Brunæs; 4 February 1936 – 24 February 2019) was a Norwegian politician for the Conservative Party.

== Early life ==
He was elected to the Norwegian Parliament from Vestfold in 1989, and was re-elected on two occasions.

Brunæs was a deputy member of the executive committee of the municipal council of Sandefjord Municipality during the term 1979–1983.
