= Torgeir Andreas Berge =

Norwegian politician (1897–1973)

Torgeir Andreas Berge (17 February 1897 – 30 April 1973) was a Norwegian farmer and politician for the Labour Party from Sandar Municipality. He represented Vestfold for three periods in the Parliament of Norway from 1950 to 1961. Prior to that, he sat in the municipal council of Sandar from 1945 to 1955. He was chairman of Statskog from 1957 to 1969 and board member of Norges Kooperative Landsforening from 1949 to 1963. Berge was born in Fusa Municipality.
