= Willy Jansson =

Norwegian politician (1927–2019)

Willy Jansson (13 May 1927 – 18 September 2019) was a Norwegian politician for the Labour Party.

Jansson was born in Sandar Municipality. He was elected to the Norwegian Parliament from Vestfold in 1969, but was not re-elected in 1973. He had previously served as a deputy representative during the terms 1961–1965 and 1965–1969. From May 1968 he served as a regular representative, filling in for Johan Andersen who had died.

On the local level he was a member of the municipal council for Sandefjord Municipality from 1955 to 1971.

Willy Jansson died on 18 September 2019, at the age of 92.
