= Theodor Dyring =

Norwegian politician (1916–1975)

Theodor Dyring (1 September 1916 – 8 March 1975) was a Norwegian politician for the Centre Party.

He was born in Larvik as a son of bookseller Johan Dyring (1881–1958) and Marie Randers (1879–1966). He graduated from the Norwegian College of Agriculture in 1946, and later studied abroad. He had a career in forestry as well as the Norwegian Home Guard. He had a background in Milorg during World War II. From 1970 to 1975 he was the director of forestry in Vestfold.

In 1963, during the short-lived cabinet Lyng, he was appointed State Secretary in the Ministry of Agriculture. He was elected to the Norwegian Parliament from Vestfold in 1965, and was re-elected on one occasion. During his second term he chaired the Standing Committee on Industry. He was a board member of his regional party chapter from 1965 to 1973. He was also a freemason.
