= Thor Knudsen =

Norwegian politician

Thor Haakon Knudsen (30 May 1927 – 10 January 2006) was a Norwegian politician for the Conservative Party.

He was born in Tønsberg.

During the cabinet Borten he worked as a State Secretary in the Ministry of Defence from January 26 1970 – January 31 1971. He was elected to the Norwegian Parliament from Vestfold in 1977, and was re-elected on two occasions. He was President of the Lagting from 1981 to 1989.

A journalist by education, he worked in Tønsberg Blad from 1949 to 1956, in the Conservative Party Press Bureau from 1956 to 1970 and as editor-in-chief of Sandefjords Blad from 1971 to 1977. He was a member of the board of Norsk Telegrambyrå from 1971 to 1980.

He was also a member of the Norwegian riksmål association, Rotary, the Norwegian Atlantic Committee and the European Movement, and presided the Norges Forsvarsforening from 1989 to 1995.
