= Sonja Mandt =

Norwegian politician (born 1960)

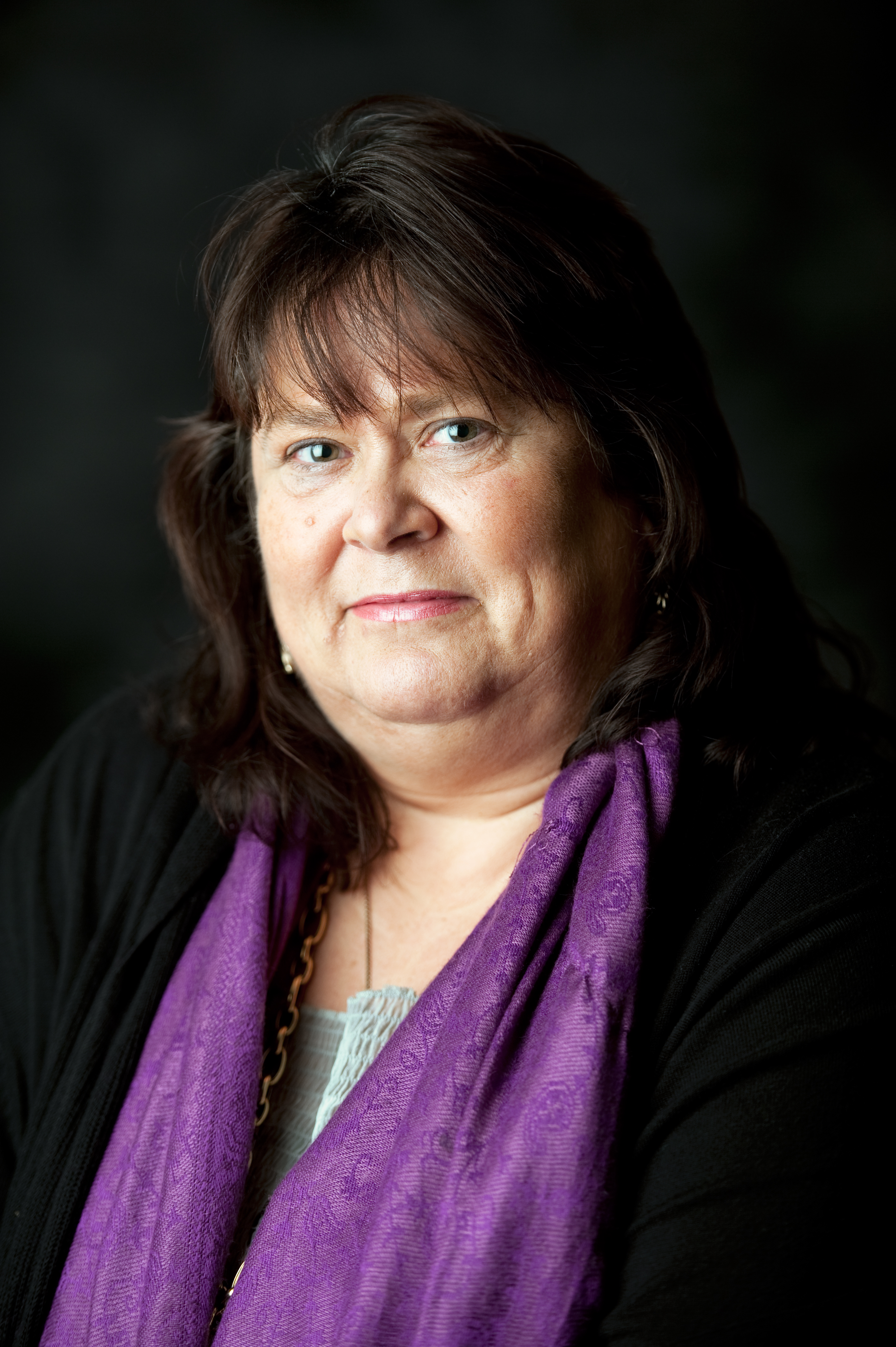
Sonja Mandt

Sonja Mandt (born 29 March 1960, in Larvik) is a Norwegian politician for the Labour Party.

She was elected to the Norwegian Parliament from Vestfold in 2005.

On the local Mandt held various positions on the municipal council of Larvik Municipality from 1995 to 2007, having also served as a deputy member from 1991 to 1995. She chaired the local party chapter from 2001 to 2004 and the regional chapter from 2000. Since 1997 she is a member of the Labour Party national board.

She graduated in Nursing from Vestfold University College in 1995 and worked Vestfold Hospital Trust 1995-2013.
