= Ingrid I. Willoch =

Norwegian politician

Member of the Storting
- In office 1981–1989

Personal details
- Born: 8 October 1943 Oslo, Norway
- Died: 23 November 2017 (aged 74)
- Party: Conservative Party
- Spouse: Georg Apenes
- Occupation: Politician

Ingrid I. Willoch (8 October 1943 – 23 November 2017) was a Norwegian politician.

She was born in Oslo to Finn Isaachsen Willoch and Kaja Beck. She was elected representative to the Storting for the period 1981–1985 for the Conservative Party. She was reelected for the period 1985–1989. She died on 23 November 2017 at the age of 74.
