= Guttorm Granum =

Norwegian politician

Guttorm Granum (4 July 1904 – 14 September 1963) was a Norwegian politician for the Conservative Party.

He was born in Vardal Municipality.

He was elected to the Norwegian Parliament from the Market towns of Hedmark and Oppland counties in 1950, and was re-elected on two occasions. Midway in his third term, he died and was replaced by Trygve Owren.

Granum was a member of the municipal council of Gjøvik Municipality in the periods 1945–1947 and 1955–1958. He was a member of the national party board from 1950 to 1954.

Outside politics, he worked as a wholesaler.
