= Sigurd Lersbryggen =

Norwegian politician

Sigurd Lersbryggen (8 July 1901 – 2 February 1980) is a Norwegian politician for the Conservative Party.

He was elected to the Norwegian Parliament from Vestfold in 1945, and was re-elected on two occasions.

Lersbryggen was born in Strømm and served as mayor of Strømm municipality in the periods 1934–1937, 1937–1940 and 1945, and as a regular municipality council member in 1931–1934, 1940–1941 and 1955–1959.
