= Laurits Grønland =

Norwegian politician

Laurits Grønland (12 June 1887 – 29 March 1957) was a Norwegian politician for the Labour Party.

He was born in Nes, Buskerud.

He was elected to the Norwegian Parliament from Vestfold in 1945, and was re-elected on one occasion. He had previously served in the position of deputy representative during the terms 1931–1933 and 1934–1936.

On the local level Grønland was a member of the executive committee of the Skoger Municipality municipal council from 1922 to 1940.

He spent his professional career in the Norwegian State Railways.
