= Astrid Murberg Martinsen =

Norwegian politician

Astrid Murberg Martinsen (born 8 May 1932 in Holmestrand, died 11 August 1991) was a Norwegian politician for the Labour Party.

She was elected to the Norwegian Parliament from Vestfold in 1969, and was re-elected on three occasions. She had previously served as a deputy representative during the term 1965–1969.

On the local level she was a member of the executive committee of Holmestrand Municipality council from 1967 to 1971.

Outside politics she worked as a school teacher.
