= Elsa Skarbøvik =

Norwegian politician (born 1948)

Elsa Skarbøvik (born 3 November 1948 in Oslo) is a Norwegian politician for the Christian Democratic Party.

She was elected to the Norwegian Parliament from Vestfold in 1997, and was re-elected on one occasion. She had previously served in the position of deputy representative during the term 1985–1989.

Skarbøvik was a member of the Sem Municipality council from 1975 to 1985, serving the last two years as deputy mayor. She was also a member of Vestfold county council during the term 1979–1983.
