= Torgeir Andersen =

Norwegian politician (1916–1991)

Torgeir Andersen (born 16 February 1916 in Nøtterøy, died 5 February 1991) was a Norwegian politician for the Conservative Party.

He was elected to the Norwegian Parliament from Vestfold in 1969, and was re-elected on one occasion.

On the local level he was a member of the municipal council of Nøtterøy Municipality from 1951 to 1971, serving as mayor from 1959 to 1969. He was county mayor of Vestfold from 1963 to 1971. He chaired the county party chapter from 1972 to 1975.

Government offices
New office	County mayor of Vestfold; 1963–1971	Succeeded by Harald Thaulow
