= Karin Lian =

Norwegian politician (born 1942)

- Born: 12 March 1942 (age 84); Holmestrand
- Citizenship: Norwegian
- Occupation: politician

Karin Lian (born 12 March 1942 in Holmestrand) is a Norwegian politician for the Labour Party.

She was elected to the Norwegian Parliament from Vestfold in 1985, and was re-elected on two occasions. She also served in the position of deputy representative during the terms 1977–1981, 1981–1985 and 1997–2001. During the latter period she met as a regular representative meanwhile Jørgen Kosmo was appointed to the cabinet.

Lian was a member of Vestfold county council from 1979 to 1983.
