= Morten Stordalen =

Norwegian politician (born 1968)

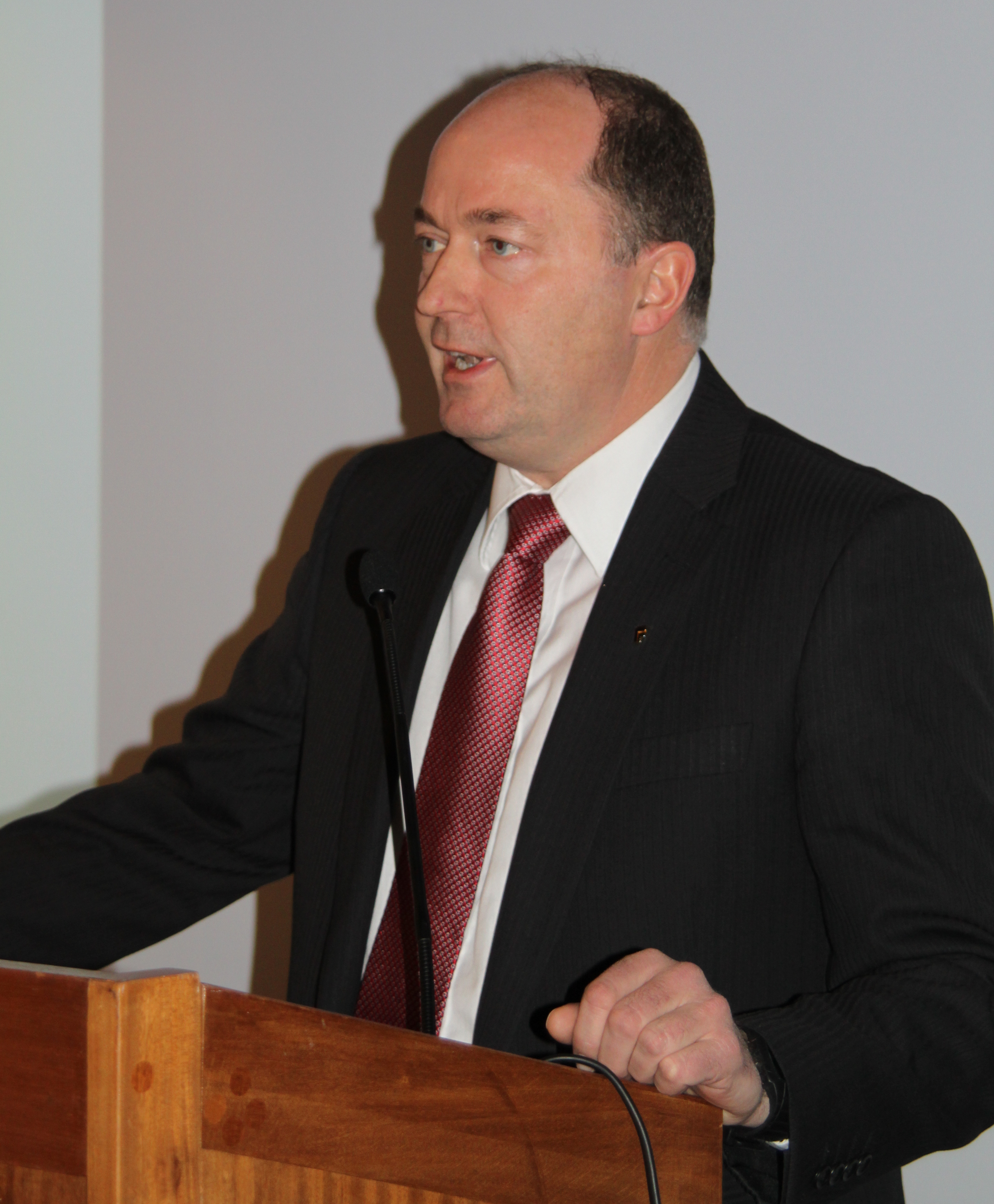

Member of the Storting
- Incumbent
- Assumed office 1 October 2013
- Constituency: Vestfold

First Vice President of the Storting
- Incumbent
- Assumed office 23 April 2026
- President: Masud Gharahkhani (Ap)
- Preceded by: Morten Wold (FrP)

Fourth Vice President of the Storting
- In office 10 October 2025 – 23 April 2026
- President: Masud Gharahkhani (Ap)
- Preceded by: Kari Henriksen (Ap)
- Succeeded by: Alf Erik Andersen (FrP)

Deputy Member of the Storting
- In office 1 October 2005 – 30 September 2013
- Constituency: Vestfold

Deputy Mayor of Re Municipality
- In office 2002–2011
- Mayor: Thorvald Hillestad (Sp)
- Preceded by: Position established
- Succeeded by: Trude Viola Antonsen (Ap)

Personal details
- Born: 5 October 1968 (age 58)
- Party: Progress

Finn Morten Stordalen (born 5 October 1968) is a Norwegian politician for the Progress Party. He has been a member of the Storting since 2013.

He served as a deputy representative to the Storting from Vestfold during the terms 2005–2009 and 2009–2013. He was elected to the Storting in 2013 and was reelected in 2017, 2021 and 2025. In 2025, he joined the Storting presidency, first as Fourth Vice President before moving up to First Vice President in April 2026.

On the local level, he is a former deputy mayor of Re Municipality.
