= Standing Committee on Defence (Norway) =

The Standing Committee on Defence is a former standing committee of the Parliament of Norway. Following the 2009 election, the committee was merged with the Standing Committee on Foreign Affairs to form the Standing Committee on Foreign Affairs and Defence.
