= Asbjørn Lillås =

Norwegian politician (1919–1983)

Asbjørn Lillås (19 April 1919 – 26 May 1983) was a Norwegian politician for the Labour Party.

He was born in Nøtterøy Municipality. He was elected to the Norwegian Parliament from Vestfold in 1961, and was re-elected on two occasions. He had previously been a deputy representative from 1954–1957 and 1958–1961.
