= Ingolv Helland (politician) =

Norwegian politician

Ingolv Helland (29 March 1906 – 9 April 1999) was a Norwegian politician for Venstre.

He was born in Hamre.

He was elected to the Norwegian Parliament from Rogaland in 1961, and was re-elected in 1965.
