= Bjarne Støtvig =

Norwegian politician (1898–1982)

Bjarne Støtvig (24 June 1898 – 8 January 1982) was a Norwegian politician for the Conservative Party.

He was born in Botne Municipality. He was elected to the Norwegian Parliament from the Market towns of Vestfold in 1950–1953, and was re-elected 1958 and 1961. He had previously served in the position of deputy representative during the term 1945–1949.

Støtvig was a member of the executive committee the municipal council of larvik Municipality in the periods 1954–1955 and 1955–1957, and was a regular council member between 1945 and 1963.
