= Lars Amandus Aasgard =

Norwegian politician (1907–1984)

Lars Amandus Aasgard (18 May 1907 – 4 November 1984) was a Norwegian politician for the Christian Democratic Party.

He was born in Lindaas Municipality. He was elected to the Norwegian Parliament from Hordaland in 1961, and was re-elected on one occasion. He had previously served as a deputy representative in the periods 1954–1957 and 1958–1961.

On the local level, Aasgard was deputy mayor of Lindås Municipality in the period 1947–1951, and mayor from 1951 to 1963. He spent most of his professional career managing a furniture factory.
