= Johan Møller Warmedal =

Norwegian politician

Johan Møller Warmedal (28 April 1914 – 19 August 1988) was a Norwegian politician for the Conservative Party.

He was born in Trondenes Municipality. He was elected to the Norwegian Parliament from Vestfold in 1954, and was re-elected on three occasions. He had previously been a deputy representative from 1950–1953.

Warmedal was deputy mayor of Nøtterøy Municipality in the period 1947–1948 and rose to the position of mayor in the terms 1948–1951 and 1951–1955.
