= Gunvor Katharina Eker =

Norwegian politician

Gunvor Katharina Eker (15 August 1906 – 22 July 1980) was a Norwegian politician for the Labour Party.

She was born in Marker Municipality. She was elected to the Norwegian Parliament from Vestfold in 1961, and was re-elected on one occasion. She had previously been a deputy representative from 1958, but replaced Oscar Fredrik Torp on his death in May 1958 and sat through the term.

Eker was a member of the municipal council of Larvik Municipality for the term 1955–1959.
