= Trygve Owren =

Norwegian politician

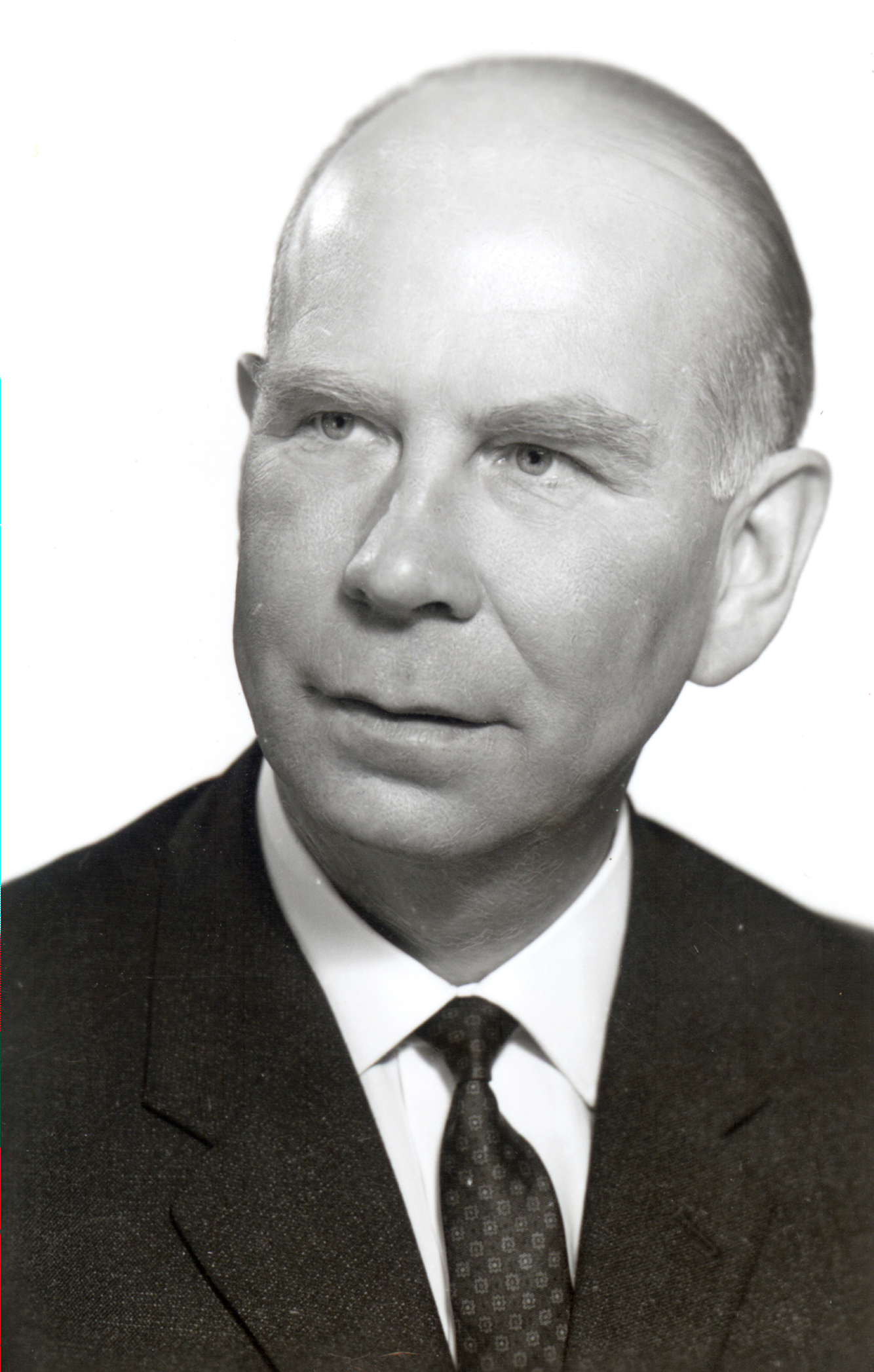
Trygve Owren

Trygve Owren (7 October 1912 – 3 March 1987) was a Norwegian politician of the Conservative Party.

He was elected to the Norwegian Parliament from Oppland in 1965, but was not re-elected in 1969. He had previously served in the position of deputy representative during the terms 1958–1961 and 1961–1965. During his second term as a Deputy, in September 1963, he replaced the deceased Guttorm Granum.

Owren was born in Fåberg Municipality and was involved in local politics in Fåberg Municipality and its successor Lillehammer Municipality, between 1954 and 1967.
