= Rolf Schjerven =

Norwegian politician

Rolf Schjerven (15 October 1918 – 26 October 1978) was a Norwegian politician for the Conservative Party.

He was elected to the Norwegian Parliament from Vestfold in 1961, and was re-elected on one occasion. He had previously been a deputy representative from 1954–1957.

Schjerven was born in Lardal Municipality and was a member of the municipal council of Lardal Municipality in the terms 1945–1947, 1947–1951 and 1951–1955.
