= Reidar Strømdahl =

Norwegian politician

Reidar Strømdahl (12 May 1913 – 31 December 2006) was a Norwegian politician for the Labour Party.

He was born in Skoger.

He was elected to the Norwegian Parliament from Vestfold in 1950, and was re-elected on four occasions.
