= Hordaland (Storting constituency) =

Constituency of the Storting, the national legislature of Norway

- Constituency for the Storting
- Location of Hordaland within Norway
- Municipality: List: Alver; Askøy; Austevoll; Austrheim; Bergen; Bjørnafjorden; Bømlo; Eidfjord; Etne; Fedje; Fitjar; Kvam; Kvinnherad; Masfjorden; Modalen; Osterøy; Øygarden; Samnanger; Stord; Sveio; Tysnes; Ullensvang; Ulvik; Vaksdal; Voss
- County: Vestland
- Population: 545,813 (2025)
- Electorate: 397,478 (2025)
- Area: 15,438 km^{2} (2025)

Current constituency
- Created: 1921
- Seats: List: 15 (2013–present); 14 (2005–2013); 15 (1973–2005); 10 (1953–1973); 8 (1921–1953)
- Members of the Storting: List: Stig Abrahamsen (FrP); Rune Bakervik (Ap); Peter Christian Frølich (H); June Trengereid Gruer (Ap); Marthe Hammer (SV); Silje Hjemdal (FrP); Benjamin Jakobsen (Ap); Martin Jonsterhaug (Ap); Sofie Marhaug (R); Linda Monsen Merkesdal (Ap); Helge André Njåstad (FrP); Frøya Sjursæther (MDG); Erna Solberg (H); Kjersti Toppe (Sp); Ove Bernt Trellevik (H); Joel Ystebø (KrF)
- Created from: List: Hardanger; Inner Søndhordland; Mid Hordland; North Hordland; Outer Søndhordland; Voss; Bergen

Hordaland is one of the 19 multi-member constituencies of the Storting, the national legislature of Norway. The constituency was established in 1921 following the introduction of proportional representation for elections to the Storting. The Bergen constituency was merged into the Hordaland constituency in 1973 after the city of Bergen lost its county status in 1972. Hordaland consists of the municipalities of Alver, Askøy, Austevoll, Austrheim, Bergen, Bjørnafjorden, Bømlo, Eidfjord, Etne, Fedje, Fitjar, Kvam, Kvinnherad, Masfjorden, Modalen, Osterøy, Øygarden, Samnanger, Stord, Sveio, Tysnes, Ullensvang, Ulvik, Vaksdal and Voss in the county of Vestland. The constituency currently elects 15 of the 169 members of the Storting using the open party-list proportional representation electoral system. At the 2025 parliamentary election it had 397,478 registered electors.

== Electoral system ==
Hordaland currently elects 15 of the 169 members of the Storting using the open (Note: Although technically elections to the Storting have open lists, they are in effect closed lists as a majority of those voting for a party must make changes to the lists for the changes to take effect, which has never happened since the introduction of proportional representation in 1921, and as result candidates are elected in the order submitted by the party.) party-list proportional representation electoral system. Constituency seats are allocated by the County Electoral Committee using the Modified Sainte-Laguë method. Compensatory seats (seats at large or levelling seats) are calculated based on the national vote and are allocated by the National Electoral Committee using the Modified Sainte-Laguë method at the constituency level (one for each constituency). Only parties that reach the 4% national threshold compete for compensatory seats.

== Election results ==
=== Summary ===
Election	Communists K			Reds R / RV / FMS			Socialist Left SV / SF			Labour Ap			Greens MDG			Centre Sp / Bp / L			Liberals V			Christian Democrats KrF			Conservatives H			Progress FrP / ALP		
Election	Votes	%	Seats	Votes	%	Seats	Votes	%	Seats	Votes	%	Seats	Votes	%	Seats	Votes	%	Seats	Votes	%	Seats	Votes	%	Seats	Votes	%	Seats	Votes	%	Seats
2025				16,145	4.97%	1	18,875	5.81%	1	86,852	26.74%	4	15,802	4.86%	1	13,732	4.23%	0	11,126	3.43%	0	16,127	4.96%	1	54,809	16.87%	3	77,372	23.82%	4
2021	77	0.03%	0	14,150	4.66%	1	26,901	8.86%	1	68,945	22.72%	4	11,940	3.93%	0	29,981	9.88%	2	13,163	4.34%	0	14,724	4.85%	1	74,282	24.48%	4	38,352	12.64%	2
2017				6,402	2.14%	0	20,958	7.02%	1	68,195	22.84%	4	10,476	3.51%	0	22,594	7.57%	1	13,027	4.36%	1	16,513	5.53%	1	90,733	30.39%	5	45,060	15.09%	2
2013	127	0.04%	0	2,687	0.94%	0	14,143	4.94%	1	71,216	24.86%	4	9,171	3.20%	0	12,490	4.36%	1	16,614	5.80%	1	22,114	7.72%	1	89,682	31.31%	5	43,357	15.14%	2
2009	145	0.05%	0	6,794	2.53%	0	14,698	5.48%	1	81,636	30.46%	5	1,083	0.40%	0	14,768	5.51%	1	12,361	4.61%	0	19,138	7.14%	1	54,066	20.17%	3	61,147	22.81%	3
2005	142	0.05%	0	9,000	3.44%	0	19,615	7.50%	1	72,986	27.91%	4	388	0.15%	0	13,169	5.04%	1	18,407	7.04%	1	22,982	8.79%	1	42,902	16.40%	3	57,966	22.16%	3
2001	175	0.07%	0	9,246	3.68%	0	27,051	10.76%	2	49,390	19.64%	3	308	0.12%	0	9,701	3.86%	0	11,838	4.71%	1	39,333	15.64%	3	54,504	21.67%	3	41,582	16.53%	3
1997	173	0.07%	0	8,181	3.25%	0	12,412	4.93%	1	77,172	30.67%	5	336	0.13%	0	15,627	6.21%	1	17,838	7.09%	1	42,716	16.98%	3	33,902	13.47%	2	40,300	16.02%	2
1993	137	0.06%	0	1,662	0.70%	0	17,602	7.39%	1	78,048	32.78%	5	228	0.10%	0	40,793	17.13%	3	13,153	5.52%	1	24,120	10.13%	2	39,581	16.63%	2	12,811	5.38%	1
1989				2,979	1.18%	0	23,068	9.14%	1	75,757	30.02%	5	1,160	0.46%	0	13,485	5.34%	1	9,961	3.95%	0	29,119	11.54%	2	57,931	22.95%	4	37,023	14.67%	2
1985	344	0.14%	0	1,118	0.46%	0	12,214	5.03%	1	81,358	33.51%	5				12,790	5.27%	1	9,783	4.03%	0	29,903	12.31%	2	79,020	32.54%	5	11,738	4.83%	1
1981	560	0.24%	0	1,878	0.81%	0	11,513	4.94%	1	64,624	27.73%	4				11,516	4.94%	1	10,960	4.70%	1	31,241	13.41%	2	83,317	35.75%	5	14,499	6.22%	1
1977	750	0.35%	0	1,577	0.74%	0	7,911	3.69%	0	69,159	32.27%	6				13,544	6.32%	1	8,695	4.06%	0	38,159	17.80%	3	59,230	27.63%	5	7,074	3.30%	0
1973				992	0.50%	0	18,495	9.24%	1	56,677	28.31%	5				16,150	8.07%	1	7,730	3.86%	0	36,788	18.38%	3	35,683	17.83%	3	13,078	6.53%	1
1969	931	0.73%	0				2,842	2.21%	0	47,093	36.68%	4				14,360	11.18%	1	19,990	15.57%	1	21,974	17.11%	2	21,206	16.52%	2			
1965	903	0.76%	0				5,207	4.38%	0	39,572	33.28%	3				12,089	10.17%	1	20,760	17.46%	2	17,600	14.80%	2	22,791	19.16%	2			
1961	1,258	1.23%	0				3,569	3.48%	0	37,118	36.14%	4				10,831	10.55%	1	17,374	16.92%	2	19,020	18.52%	2	13,522	13.17%	1			
1957	1,826	1.86%	0							37,608	38.21%	4				10,563	10.73%	1	16,838	17.11%	2	20,098	20.42%	2	11,483	11.67%	1			
1953	2,765	2.84%	0							35,363	36.31%	4				9,845	10.11%	1	15,352	15.76%	2	22,803	23.41%	2	11,258	11.56%	1			
1949	3,193	3.29%	0							33,323	34.37%	3				8,438	8.70%	0	19,419	20.03%	2	21,502	22.18%	2	10,176	10.50%	1			
1945	6,324	7.95%	0							22,019	27.66%	3				4,644	5.83%	0	16,404	20.61%	2	21,299	26.76%	2	8,902	11.18%	1			
1936										18,354	24.97%	2				7,872	10.71%	1	19,103	25.99%	2				8,583	11.68%	1			
1933	1,758	2.94%	0							12,628	21.13%	2				10,010	16.75%	1	15,689	26.26%	3				5,039	8.43%	1			
1930	2,059	3.42%	0							9,596	15.92%	1				12,203	20.24%	2	26,297	43.62%	4				10,132	16.81%	1			
1927	4,373	9.33%	0							7,356	15.70%	1				10,210	21.79%	2	17,830	38.05%	4				7,092	15.13%	1			
1924	5,108	10.91%	1							695	1.48%	0				8,701	18.59%	1	19,540	41.74%	4				10,489	22.41%	2			
1921										5,259	11.57%	1				8,997	19.79%	1	18,387	40.44%	4				9,815	21.59%	2			

(Excludes compensatory seats. Figures in italics represent joint lists.)

=== Detailed ===
==== 2020s ====
===== 2025 =====
Results of the 2025 parliamentary election held on 8 September 2025:

Party		Votes	%	Seats		
Party		Votes	%	Con.	Com.	Tot.
Labour Party	Ap	86,852	26.74%	4	0	4
Progress Party	FrP	77,372	23.82%	4	0	4
Conservative Party	H	54,809	16.87%	3	0	3
Socialist Left Party	SV	18,875	5.81%	1	0	1
Red Party	R	16,145	4.97%	1	0	1
Christian Democratic Party	KrF	16,127	4.96%	1	0	1
Green Party	MDG	15,802	4.86%	1	0	1
Centre Party	Sp	13,732	4.23%	0	1	1
Liberal Party	V	11,126	3.43%	0	0	0
Generation Party	GP	3,589	1.10%	0	0	0
Pensioners' Party	PP	2,723	0.84%	0	0	0
Norway Democrats	ND	1,960	0.60%	0	0	0
Conservative	K	1,807	0.56%	0	0	0
Industry and Business Party	INP	1,721	0.53%	0	0	0
Peace and Justice	FOR	801	0.25%	0	0	0
Welfare and Innovation Party	VIP	582	0.18%	0	0	0
DNI Party	DNI	489	0.15%	0	0	0
Center Party	PS	322	0.10%	0	0	0
Valid votes		324,834	100.00%	15	1	16
Blank votes		2,525	0.77%			
Rejected votes – other		840	0.26%			
Total polled		328,199	82.57%			
Registered electors		397,478				

The following candidates were elected:

- Constituency seats - Stig Abrahamsen (FrP); Rune Bakervik (Ap); Peter Christian Frølich (H); Marthe Hammer (SV); Silje Hjemdal (FrP); Lubna Jaffery (Ap); Benjamin Jakobsen (Ap); Martin Jonsterhaug (FrP); Sofie Marhaug (R); Linda Monsen Merkesdal (Ap); Helge André Njåstad (FrP); Frøya Sjursæther (MDG); Erna Solberg (H); Ove Bernt Trellevik (H); and Joel Ystebø (KrF).
- Compensatory seat - Kjersti Toppe (Sp).

===== 2021 =====
Results of the 2021 parliamentary election held on 13 September 2021:

Party		Votes	%	Seats		
Party		Votes	%	Con.	Com.	Tot.
Conservative Party	H	74,282	24.48%	4	0	4
Labour Party	Ap	68,945	22.72%	4	0	4
Progress Party	FrP	38,352	12.64%	2	0	2
Centre Party	Sp	29,981	9.88%	2	0	2
Socialist Left Party	SV	26,901	8.86%	1	0	1
Christian Democratic Party	KrF	14,724	4.85%	1	0	1
Red Party	R	14,150	4.66%	1	0	1
Liberal Party	V	13,163	4.34%	0	1	1
Green Party	MDG	11,940	3.93%	0	0	0
Democrats in Norway		2,876	0.95%	0	0	0
Pensioners' Party	PP	2,286	0.75%	0	0	0
Industry and Business Party	INP	1,738	0.57%	0	0	0
The Christians	PDK	1,384	0.46%	0	0	0
Center Party		591	0.19%	0	0	0
Capitalist Party		527	0.17%	0	0	0
Health Party		490	0.16%	0	0	0
People's Action No to More Road Tolls	FNB	403	0.13%	0	0	0
Pirate Party of Norway		262	0.09%	0	0	0
Alliance - Alternative for Norway		206	0.07%	0	0	0
Coastal Party	KP	107	0.04%	0	0	0
The Generation Party		87	0.03%	0	0	0
Communist Party of Norway	K	77	0.03%	0	0	0
Valid votes		303,472	100.00%	15	1	16
Blank votes		2,171	0.71%			
Rejected votes – other		476	0.16%			
Total polled		306,119	80.07%			
Registered electors		382,305				

The following candidates were elected:

- Constituency seats - Nils T. Bjørke (Sp); Liv Kari Eskeland (H); Peter Christian Frølich (H); Silje Hjemdal (FrP); Odd Harald Hovland (Ap); Eigil Knutsen (Ap); Audun Lysbakken (SV); Sofie Marhaug (R); Linda Monsen Merkesdal (Ap); Helge André Njåstad (FrP); Marte Mjøs Persen (Ap); Erna Solberg (H); Kjersti Toppe (Sp); Ove Bernt Trellevik (H); and Dag Inge Ulstein (KrF).
- Compensatory seat - Sveinung Rotevatn (V).

==== 2010s ====
===== 2017 =====
Results of the 2017 parliamentary election held on 11 September 2017:

Party		Votes	%	Seats		
Party		Votes	%	Con.	Com.	Tot.
Conservative Party	H	90,733	30.39%	5	0	5
Labour Party	Ap	68,195	22.84%	4	0	4
Progress Party	FrP	45,060	15.09%	2	0	2
Centre Party	Sp	22,594	7.57%	1	1	2
Socialist Left Party	SV	20,958	7.02%	1	0	1
Christian Democratic Party	KrF	16,513	5.53%	1	0	1
Liberal Party	V	13,027	4.36%	1	0	1
Green Party	MDG	10,476	3.51%	0	0	0
Red Party	R	6,402	2.14%	0	0	0
The Christians	PDK	1,357	0.45%	0	0	0
Health Party		745	0.25%	0	0	0
Capitalist Party		601	0.20%	0	0	0
Pirate Party of Norway		486	0.16%	0	0	0
Coastal Party	KP	443	0.15%	0	0	0
Feminist Initiative	FI	370	0.12%	0	0	0
Democrats in Norway		328	0.11%	0	0	0
The Alliance		309	0.10%	0	0	0
Valid votes		298,597	100.00%	15	1	16
Blank votes		2,081	0.69%			
Rejected votes – other		835	0.28%			
Total polled		301,513	81.36%			
Registered electors		370,584				

The following candidates were elected:

- Constituency seats - Terje Breivik (V); Jette F. Christensen (Ap); Torill Eidsheim (H); Peter Christian Frølich (H); Ruth Mari Grung (Ap); Knut Arild Hareide (KrF); Silje Hjemdal (FrP); Eigil Knutsen (Ap); Audun Lysbakken (SV); Tom-Christer Nilsen (H); Helge André Njåstad (FrP); Magne Rommetveit (Ap); Erna Solberg (H); Kjersti Toppe (Sp); and Ove Bernt Trellevik (H).
- Compensatory seat - Nils T. Bjørke (Sp).

===== 2013 =====
Results of the 2013 parliamentary election held on 8 and 9 September 2013:

Party		Votes	%	Seats		
Party		Votes	%	Con.	Com.	Tot.
Conservative Party	H	89,682	31.31%	5	1	6
Labour Party	Ap	71,216	24.86%	4	0	4
Progress Party	FrP	43,357	15.14%	2	0	2
Christian Democratic Party	KrF	22,114	7.72%	1	0	1
Liberal Party	V	16,614	5.80%	1	0	1
Socialist Left Party	SV	14,143	4.94%	1	0	1
Centre Party	Sp	12,490	4.36%	1	0	1
Green Party	MDG	9,171	3.20%	0	0	0
Red Party	R	2,687	0.94%	0	0	0
The Christians	PDK	2,422	0.85%	0	0	0
Pirate Party of Norway		1,062	0.37%	0	0	0
Pensioners' Party	PP	631	0.22%	0	0	0
Democrats in Norway		275	0.10%	0	0	0
Coastal Party	KP	267	0.09%	0	0	0
People's Power		175	0.06%	0	0	0
Communist Party of Norway	K	127	0.04%	0	0	0
Valid votes		286,433	100.00%	15	1	16
Blank votes		1,360	0.47%			
Rejected votes – other		425	0.15%			
Total polled		288,218	80.62%			
Registered electors		357,496				

The following candidates were elected:

- Constituency seats - Terje Breivik (V); Jette F. Christensen (Ap); Torill Eidsheim (H); Peter Christian Frølich (H); Ruth Mari Grung (Ap); Gjermund Hagesæter (FrP); Øyvind Halleraker (H); Knut Arild Hareide (KrF); Per Rune Henriksen (Ap); Sigurd Hille (H); Audun Lysbakken (SV); Helge André Njåstad (FrP); Magne Rommetveit (Ap); Erna Solberg (H); and Kjersti Toppe (Sp).
- Compensatory seat - Ove Bernt Trellevik (H).

==== 2000s ====
===== 2009 =====
Results of the 2009 parliamentary election held on 13 and 14 September 2009:

Party		Votes	%	Seats		
Party		Votes	%	Con.	Com.	Tot.
Labour Party	Ap	81,636	30.46%	5	0	5
Progress Party	FrP	61,147	22.81%	3	1	4
Conservative Party	H	54,066	20.17%	3	0	3
Christian Democratic Party	KrF	19,138	7.14%	1	0	1
Centre Party	Sp	14,768	5.51%	1	0	1
Socialist Left Party	SV	14,698	5.48%	1	0	1
Liberal Party	V	12,361	4.61%	0	0	0
Red Party	R	6,794	2.53%	0	0	0
Green Party	MDG	1,083	0.40%	0	0	0
Pensioners' Party	PP	674	0.25%	0	0	0
Christian Unity Party	KSP	615	0.23%	0	0	0
Coastal Party	KP	335	0.12%	0	0	0
Democrats in Norway		332	0.12%	0	0	0
Center Alliance		241	0.09%	0	0	0
Communist Party of Norway	K	145	0.05%	0	0	0
Valid votes		268,033	100.00%	14	1	15
Blank votes		1,289	0.48%			
Rejected votes – other		362	0.13%			
Total polled		269,684	78.32%			
Registered electors		344,321				

The following candidates were elected:

- Constituency seats - Laila Dåvøy (KrF); Gjermund Hagesæter (FrP); Øyvind Halleraker (H); Per Rune Henriksen (Ap); Audun Lysbakken (SV); Hilde Magnusson Lydvo (Ap); Magne Rommetveit (Ap); Erna Solberg (H); Arne Sortevik (FrP); Anne-Grete Strøm-Erichsen (Ap); Dag Ole Teigen (Ap); Kjersti Toppe (Sp); Henning Warloe (H); and Karin S. Woldseth (FrP).
- Compensatory seat - Laila Reiertsen (FrP).

===== 2005 =====
Results of the 2005 parliamentary election held on 11 and 12 September 2005:

Party		Votes	%	Seats		
Party		Votes	%	Con.	Com.	Tot.
Labour Party	Ap	72,986	27.91%	4	0	4
Progress Party	FrP	57,966	22.16%	3	0	3
Conservative Party	H	42,902	16.40%	3	0	3
Christian Democratic Party	KrF	22,982	8.79%	1	1	2
Socialist Left Party	SV	19,615	7.50%	1	0	1
Liberal Party	V	18,407	7.04%	1	0	1
Centre Party	Sp	13,169	5.04%	1	0	1
Red Electoral Alliance	RV	9,000	3.44%	0	0	0
Coastal Party	KP	1,439	0.55%	0	0	0
Pensioners' Party	PP	985	0.38%	0	0	0
Democrats		537	0.21%	0	0	0
Christian Unity Party	KSP	464	0.18%	0	0	0
Abortion Opponents' List		439	0.17%	0	0	0
Green Party	MDG	388	0.15%	0	0	0
Communist Party of Norway	K	142	0.05%	0	0	0
Liberal People's Party	DLF	109	0.04%	0	0	0
Valid votes		261,530	100.00%	14	1	15
Blank votes		905	0.34%			
Rejected votes – other		176	0.07%			
Total polled		262,611	79.21%			
Registered electors		331,552				

The following candidates were elected:

- Constituency seats - Olav Akselsen (Ap); Gjermund Hagesæter (FrP); Øyvind Halleraker (H); Torbjørn Hansen (H); Per Rune Henriksen (Ap); Hilde Magnusson Lydvo (Ap); Rune J. Skjælaaen (Sp); Erna Solberg (H); Ingebrigt S. Sørfonn (KrF); Arne Sortevik (FrP); Lars Sponheim (V); Anne-Grete Strøm-Erichsen (Ap); Ågot Valle (SV); and Karin S. Woldseth (FrP).
- Compensatory seat - Laila Dåvøy (KrF).

===== 2001 =====
Results of the 2001 parliamentary election held on 9 and 10 September 2001:

Party		Votes	%	Seats		
Party		Votes	%	Con.	Com.	Tot.
Conservative Party	H	54,504	21.67%	3	1	4
Labour Party	Ap	49,390	19.64%	3	0	3
Progress Party	FrP	41,582	16.53%	3	0	3
Christian Democratic Party	KrF	39,333	15.64%	3	0	3
Socialist Left Party	SV	27,051	10.76%	2	0	2
Liberal Party	V	11,838	4.71%	1	0	1
Centre Party	Sp	9,701	3.86%	0	1	1
Red Electoral Alliance	RV	9,246	3.68%	0	0	0
Coastal Party	KP	3,108	1.24%	0	0	0
The Political Party	DPP	2,312	0.92%	0	0	0
Pensioners' Party	PP	1,189	0.47%	0	0	0
Christian Unity Party	KSP	837	0.33%	0	0	0
County Lists		389	0.15%	0	0	0
Green Party	MDG	308	0.12%	0	0	0
Fatherland Party	FLP	284	0.11%	0	0	0
Communist Party of Norway	K	175	0.07%	0	0	0
Natural Law Party		129	0.05%	0	0	0
Norwegian People's Party	NFP	103	0.04%	0	0	0
Valid votes		251,479	100.00%	15	2	17
Rejected votes		1,214	0.48%			
Total polled		252,693	77.83%			
Registered electors		324,690				

The following candidates were elected:

- Constituency seats - Olav Akselsen (Ap); Ranveig Frøiland (Ap); Gjermund Hagesæter (FrP); Øyvind Halleraker (H); Ingmar Ljones (KrF); Leif Lund (Ap); Audun Lysbakken (SV); Oddvard Nilsen (H); Anita Apelthun Sæle (KrF); Erna Solberg (H); Ingebrigt S. Sørfonn (KrF); Arne Sortevik (FrP); Lars Sponheim (V); Ågot Valle (SV); and Karin S. Woldseth (FrP).
- Compensatory seats - Torbjørn Hansen (H); and Rune J. Skjælaaen (Sp).

==== 1990s ====
===== 1997 =====
Results of the 1997 parliamentary election held on 15 September 1997:

Party		Votes	%	Seats		
Party		Votes	%	Con.	Com.	Tot.
Labour Party	Ap	77,172	30.67%	5	0	5
Christian Democratic Party	KrF	42,716	16.98%	3	0	3
Progress Party	FrP	40,300	16.02%	2	0	2
Conservative Party	H	33,902	13.47%	2	0	2
Liberal Party	V	17,838	7.09%	1	1	2
Centre Party	Sp	15,627	6.21%	1	0	1
Socialist Left Party	SV	12,412	4.93%	1	0	1
Red Electoral Alliance	RV	8,181	3.25%	0	0	0
Pensioners' Party	PP	1,287	0.51%	0	0	0
Christian Conservative Party	KKP	910	0.36%	0	0	0
Fatherland Party	FLP	479	0.19%	0	0	0
Green Party	MDG	336	0.13%	0	0	0
Natural Law Party		266	0.11%	0	0	0
Communist Party of Norway	K	173	0.07%	0	0	0
Valid votes		251,599	100.00%	15	1	16
Rejected votes		665	0.26%			
Total polled		252,264	79.24%			
Registered electors		318,356				

The following candidates were elected:

- Constituency seats - Olav Akselsen (Ap); John Dale (Sp); Ranveig Frøiland (Ap); Grete Knudsen (Ap); Terje Knudsen (Frp); Leif Lund (Ap); Are Næss (KrF); Oddvard Nilsen (H); Hans J. Røsjorde (FrP); Anita Apelthun Sæle (KrF); Erna Solberg (H); Ingebrigt S. Sørfonn (KrF); Lars Sponheim (V); Rita Tveiten (Ap); and Ågot Valle (SV).
- Compensatory seat - May Britt Vihovde (V).

===== 1993 =====
Results of the 1993 parliamentary election held on 12 and 13 September 1993:

Party		Votes	%	Seats		
Party		Votes	%	Con.	Com.	Tot.
Labour Party	Ap	78,048	32.78%	5	0	5
Centre Party	Sp	40,793	17.13%	3	0	3
Conservative Party	H	39,581	16.63%	2	0	2
Christian Democratic Party	KrF	24,120	10.13%	2	0	2
Socialist Left Party	SV	17,602	7.39%	1	0	1
Liberal Party	V	13,153	5.52%	1	0	1
Progress Party	FrP	12,811	5.38%	1	0	1
Political Alternative Hordaland		3,272	1.37%	0	0	0
Pensioners' Party	PP	2,822	1.19%	0	0	0
Fatherland Party	FLP	1,675	0.70%	0	0	0
Red Electoral Alliance	RV	1,662	0.70%	0	0	0
New Future Coalition Party	SNF	866	0.36%	0	0	0
Christian Conservative Party	KKP	668	0.28%	0	0	0
Natural Law Party		288	0.12%	0	0	0
Green Party	MDG	228	0.10%	0	0	0
Common Future		205	0.09%	0	0	0
Liberal People's Party	DLF	143	0.06%	0	0	0
Communist Party of Norway	K	137	0.06%	0	0	0
Valid votes		238,074	100.00%	15	0	15
Rejected votes		632	0.26%			
Total polled		238,706	76.50%			
Registered electors		312,033				

The following candidates were elected:

- Constituency seats - Olav Akselsen (Ap); Hallvard Bakke (Ap); John Dale (Sp); Ranveig Frøiland (Ap); Bjørg Hope Galtung (Sp); Grete Knudsen (Ap); Kjellbjørg Lunde (SV); Are Næss (KrF); Oddvard Nilsen (H); Hans J. Røsjorde (FrP); Anita Apelthun Sæle (KrF); Erna Solberg (H); Lars Sponheim (V); Magnus Stangeland (Sp); and Rita Tveiten (Ap).

==== 1980s ====
===== 1989 =====
Results of the 1989 parliamentary election held on 10 and 11 September 1989:

Party		Votes	%	Seats		
Party		Votes	%	Con.	Com.	Tot.
Labour Party	Ap	75,757	30.02%	5	0	5
Conservative Party	H	57,931	22.95%	4	0	4
Progress Party	FrP	37,023	14.67%	2	1	3
Christian Democratic Party	KrF	29,119	11.54%	2	0	2
Socialist Left Party	SV	23,068	9.14%	1	0	1
Centre Party	Sp	13,485	5.34%	1	0	1
Liberal Party	V	9,961	3.95%	0	0	0
County Lists for Environment and Solidarity	FMS	2,979	1.18%	0	0	0
Green Party	MDG	1,160	0.46%	0	0	0
Pensioners' Party	PP	901	0.36%	0	0	0
Stop Immigration	SI	890	0.35%	0	0	0
Liberals-Europe Party		56	0.02%	0	0	0
Free Elected Representatives		49	0.02%	0	0	0
Valid votes		252,379	100.00%	15	1	16
Rejected votes		347	0.14%			
Total polled		252,726	83.24%			
Registered electors		303,618				

The following candidates were elected:

- Constituency seats - Olav Akselsen (Ap); Svein Alsaker (KrF); Hallvard Bakke (Ap); Ranveig Frøiland (Ap); Nils O. Golten (H); Knut Hanselmann (FrP); Britt Harkestad (KrF); Grete Knudsen (Ap); Kjellbjørg Lunde (SV); Hans J. Røsjorde (FrP); Arne Skauge (H); Erna Solberg (H); Arne Alsåker Spilde (H); Magnus Stangeland (Sp); and Leiv Stensland (Ap).
- Compensatory seat - Inger-Marie Ytterhorn (FrP).

===== 1985 =====
Results of the 1985 parliamentary election held on 8 and 9 September 1985:

Party		Party			List Alliance		
Party		Votes	%	Seats	Votes	%	Seats
Labour Party	Ap	81,358	33.51%	5	81,358	33.67%	5
Conservative Party	H	79,020	32.54%	5	79,020	32.71%	5
Christian Democratic Party	KrF	29,903	12.31%	2	43,833	18.14%	3
Centre Party	Sp	12,790	5.27%	1	43,833	18.14%	3
Liberal People's Party	DLF	2,355	0.97%	0	43,833	18.14%	3
Socialist Left Party	SV	12,214	5.03%	1	12,214	5.06%	1
Progress Party	FrP	11,738	4.83%	1	11,738	4.86%	1
Liberal Party	V	9,783	4.03%	0	9,783	4.05%	0
Pensioners' Party	PP	2,197	0.90%	0	2,197	0.91%	0
Red Electoral Alliance	RV	1,118	0.46%	0	1,118	0.46%	0
Communist Party of Norway	K	344	0.14%	0	344	0.14%	0
Valid votes		242,820	100.00%	15	241,605	100.00%	15
Rejected votes		283	0.12%				
Total polled		243,103	83.05%				
Registered electors		292,733					

As the list alliance was not entitled to more seats contesting as an alliance than it was contesting as individual parties, the distribution of seats was as party votes.

The following candidates were elected: Svein Alsaker (KrF); Hallvard Bakke (Ap); Brita Borge (H); Ranveig Frøiland (Ap); Nils O. Golten (H); Britt Harkestad (KrF); Grete Knudsen (Ap); Bjarne Kristiansen (Ap); Kjellbjørg Lunde (SV); Inger-Lise Skarstein (H); Arne Skauge (H); Arne Alsåker Spilde (H); Magnus Stangeland (Sp); Leiv Stensland (Ap); and Bjørn Erling Ytterhorn (FrP).

===== 1981 =====
Results of the 1981 parliamentary election held on 13 and 14 September 1981:

Party		Votes	%	Seats
Conservative Party	H	83,317	35.75%	5
Labour Party	Ap	64,624	27.73%	4
Christian Democratic Party	KrF	31,241	13.41%	2
Progress Party	FrP	14,499	6.22%	1
Centre Party	Sp	11,516	4.94%	1
Socialist Left Party	SV	11,513	4.94%	1
Liberal Party	V	10,960	4.70%	1
Liberal People's Party	DLF	2,809	1.21%	0
Red Electoral Alliance	RV	1,878	0.81%	0
Communist Party of Norway	K	560	0.24%	0
Plebiscite Party		82	0.04%	0
Free Elected Representatives		49	0.02%	0
Valid votes		233,048	100.00%	15
Rejected votes		297	0.13%	
Total polled		233,345	82.52%	
Registered electors		282,758		

The following candidates were elected: Hallvard Bakke (Ap); Mons Espelid (V); Aksel Fossen (Ap); Asbjørn Haugstvedt (KrF); Sverre Helland (Sp); Per Hysing-Dahl (H); Grete Knudsen (Ap); Kjellbjørg Lunde (SV); Arne Nilsen (Ap); Håkon Randal (H); Inger-Lise Skarstein (H); Arne Skauge (H); Arne Alsåker Spilde (H); Hans Olav Tungesvik (KrF); and Bjørn Erling Ytterhorn (FrP).

==== 1970s ====
===== 1977 =====
Results of the 1977 parliamentary election held on 11 and 12 September 1977:

Party		Votes	%	Seats
Labour Party	Ap	69,159	32.27%	6
Conservative Party	H	59,230	27.63%	5
Christian Democratic Party	KrF	38,159	17.80%	3
Centre Party	Sp	13,544	6.32%	1
Liberal Party	V	8,695	4.06%	0
Socialist Left Party	SV	7,911	3.69%	0
New People's Party	DNF	7,844	3.66%	0
Progress Party	FrP	7,074	3.30%	0
Red Electoral Alliance	RV	1,577	0.74%	0
Communist Party of Norway	K	750	0.35%	0
Single Person's Party		249	0.12%	0
Free Elected Representatives		76	0.04%	0
Norwegian Democratic Party		71	0.03%	0
Valid votes		214,339	100.00%	15
Rejected votes		319	0.15%	
Total polled		214,658	81.94%	
Registered electors		261,958		

The following candidates were elected: Hallvard Bakke (Ap); Aksel Fossen (Ap); Harry Hansen (Ap); Asbjørn Haugstvedt (KrF); Sverre Helland (Sp); Per Hysing-Dahl (H); Georg Johan Jacobsen (Ap); Sverre L. Mo (KrF); Arne Nilsen (Ap); Håkon Randal (H); Inger-Lise Skarstein (H); Arne Skauge (H); Margit Tøsdal (Ap); Hans Olav Tungesvik (KrF); and Sigrid Utkilen (H).

===== 1973 =====
Results of the 1973 parliamentary election held on 9 and 10 September 1973:

Party		Votes	%	Seats
Labour Party	Ap	56,677	28.31%	5
Christian Democratic Party	KrF	36,788	18.38%	3
Conservative Party	H	35,683	17.83%	3
Socialist Electoral League	SV	18,495	9.24%	1
Centre Party	Sp	16,150	8.07%	1
New People's Party	DNF	13,690	6.84%	1
Anders Lange's Party	ALP	13,078	6.53%	1
Liberal Party	V	7,730	3.86%	0
Red Electoral Alliance	RV	992	0.50%	0
Single Person's Party		353	0.18%	0
Women's Free Elected Representatives		318	0.16%	0
Norwegian Democratic Party		223	0.11%	0
Other		1	0.00%	0
Valid votes		200,178	100.00%	15
Rejected votes		326	0.16%	
Total polled		200,504	79.32%	
Registered electors		252,792		

The following candidates were elected: Bergfrid Fjose (KrF); Aksel Fossen (Ap); Harry Hansen (Ap); Asbjørn Haugstvedt (KrF); Sverre Helland (Sp); Per Hysing-Dahl (H); Georg Johan Jacobsen (Ap); Sverre L. Mo (KrF); Ole Myrvoll (DNF); Arne Nilsen (Ap); Einar Nyheim (SV); Håkon Randal (H); Harald Bjarne Slettebø (ALP); Margit Tøsdal (Ap); and Sigrid Utkilen (H).

==== 1960s ====
===== 1969 =====
Results of the 1969 parliamentary election held on 7 and 8 September 1969:

Party		Votes	%	Seats
Labour Party	Ap	47,093	36.68%	4
Christian Democratic Party	KrF	21,974	17.11%	2
Conservative Party	H	21,206	16.52%	2
Liberal Party	V	19,990	15.57%	1
Centre Party	Sp	14,360	11.18%	1
Socialist People's Party	SF	2,842	2.21%	0
Communist Party of Norway	K	931	0.73%	0
Wild Votes		3	0.00%	0
Valid votes		128,399	100.00%	10
Rejected votes		239	0.19%	
Total polled		128,638	80.74%	
Registered electors		159,316		

The following candidates were elected: Bergfrid Fjose (KrF); Aksel Fossen (Ap); Sverre Helland (Sp); Per Hysing-Dahl (H); Kjeld Langeland (H); Olav Marås (Ap); Sverre L. Mo (KrF); Thor Myklebust (V); Arne Nilsen (Ap); and Ingvald Ulveseth (Ap).

===== 1965 =====
Results of the 1965 parliamentary election held on 12 and 13 September 1965:

Party		Votes	%	Seats
Labour Party	Ap	39,572	33.28%	3
Conservative Party	H	22,791	19.16%	2
Liberal Party	V	20,760	17.46%	2
Christian Democratic Party	KrF	17,600	14.80%	2
Centre Party	Sp	12,089	10.17%	1
Socialist People's Party	SF	5,207	4.38%	0
Communist Party of Norway	K	903	0.76%	0
Valid votes		118,922	100.00%	10
Rejected votes		436	0.37%	
Total polled		119,358	82.71%	
Registered electors		144,314		

The following candidates were elected: Lars Amandus Aasgard (KrF); Olav Hordvik (V); Kjeld Langeland (H); Lars Leiro (Sp); Kaare Meland (H); Sverre L. Mo (KrF); Thor Myklebust (V); Arne Nilsen (Ap); Steffen Ingebriktsen Toppe (Ap); and Ingvald Ulveseth (Ap).

===== 1961 =====
Results of the 1961 parliamentary election held on 11 September 1961:

Party		Votes	%	Seats
Labour Party	Ap	37,118	36.14%	4
Christian Democratic Party	KrF	19,020	18.52%	2
Liberal Party	V	17,374	16.92%	2
Conservative Party	H	13,522	13.17%	1
Centre Party	Sp	10,831	10.55%	1
Socialist People's Party	SF	3,569	3.48%	0
Communist Party of Norway	K	1,258	1.23%	0
Valid votes		102,692	100.00%	10
Rejected votes		584	0.57%	
Total polled		103,276	74.56%	
Registered electors		138,505		

The following candidates were elected: Lars Amandus Aasgard (KrF), 19,016 votes; Isak Larsson Flatabø (Ap), 37,115 votes; Christian L. Holm (H), 13,520 votes; Olav Hordvik (V), 17,373 votes; Torstein Kvamme (KrF), 19,015 votes; Lars Leiro (Sp), 10,831 votes; Jakob Martin Pettersen (Ap), 37,114 votes; Hjalmar Olai Storeide (Ap), 37,118 votes; Margit Tøsdal (Ap), 37,115 votes; and Knut Ytre-Arne (V), 17,375 votes.

==== 1950s ====
===== 1957 =====
Results of the 1957 parliamentary election held on 7 October 1957:

Party		Votes	%	Seats
Labour Party	Ap	37,608	38.21%	4
Christian Democratic Party	KrF	20,098	20.42%	2
Liberal Party	V	16,838	17.11%	2
Conservative Party	H	11,483	11.67%	1
Farmers' Party	Bp	10,563	10.73%	1
Communist Party of Norway	K	1,826	1.86%	0
Valid votes		98,416	100.00%	10
Rejected votes		615	0.62%	
Total polled		99,031	73.26%	
Registered electors		135,171		

The following candidates were elected: Isak Larsson Flatabø (Ap); Christian L. Holm (H); Olav Hordvik (V); Torstein Kvamme (KrF); Lars Leiro (Bp); Ola Olsen (KrF); Jakob Martin Pettersen (Ap); Hjalmar Olai Storeide (Ap); Knut Severin Jakobsen Vik (Ap); and Knut Ytre-Arne (V).

===== 1953 =====
Results of the 1953 parliamentary election held on 12 October 1953:

Party		Votes	%	Seats
Labour Party	Ap	35,363	36.31%	4
Christian Democratic Party	KrF	22,803	23.41%	2
Liberal Party	V	15,352	15.76%	2
Conservative Party	H	11,258	11.56%	1
Farmers' Party	Bp	9,845	10.11%	1
Communist Party of Norway	K	2,765	2.84%	0
Wild Votes		1	0.00%	0
Valid votes		97,387	100.00%	10
Rejected votes		508	0.52%	
Total polled		97,895	74.73%	
Registered electors		131,005		

The following candidates were elected: Isak Larsson Flatabø (Ap); Christian L. Holm (H); Olav Hordvik (V); Ola Høyland (Bp); Torstein Kvamme (KrF); Ola Olsen (KrF); Jakob Martin Pettersen (Ap); Hjalmar Olai Storeide (Ap); Knut Severin Jakobsen Vik (Ap); and Knut Ytre-Arne (V).

==== 1940s ====
===== 1949 =====
Results of the 1949 parliamentary election held on 10 October 1949:

Party		Votes	%	Seats
Labour Party	Ap	33,323	34.37%	3
Christian Democratic Party	KrF	21,502	22.18%	2
Liberal Party	V	19,419	20.03%	2
Conservative Party	H	10,176	10.50%	1
Farmers' Party	Bp	8,438	8.70%	0
Communist Party of Norway	K	3,193	3.29%	0
Society Party	Samfp	893	0.92%	0
Valid votes		96,944	100.00%	8
Rejected votes		718	0.74%	
Total polled		97,662	78.68%	
Registered electors		124,120		

The following candidates were elected: Isak Larsson Flatabø (Ap); Haldor Andreas Haldorsen (V); Christian L. Holm (H); Nils Lavik (KrF); Jakob Martin Pettersen (Ap); Ole Jensen Rong (Ap); Hans Svarstad (KrF); and Knut Ytre-Arne (V).

===== 1945 =====
Results of the 1945 parliamentary election held on 8 October 1945:

Party		Votes	%	Seats
Labour Party	Ap	22,019	27.66%	3
Christian Democratic Party	KrF	21,299	26.76%	2
Liberal Party	V	16,404	20.61%	2
Conservative Party	H	8,902	11.18%	1
Communist Party of Norway	K	6,324	7.95%	0
Farmers' Party	Bp	4,644	5.83%	0
Wild Votes		3	0.00%	0
Valid votes		79,595	100.00%	8
Rejected votes		585	0.73%	
Total polled		80,180	71.97%	
Registered electors		111,403		

The following candidates were elected: Isak Larsson Flatabø (Ap); Haldor Andreas Haldorsen (V); Nils Lavik (KrF); Jakob Martin Pettersen (Ap); Henrik Friis Robberstad (H); Ole Jensen Rong (Ap); Hans Svarstad (KrF); and Nils Tveit (V).

==== 1930s ====
===== 1936 =====
Results of the 1936 parliamentary election held on 19 October 1936:

Party		Party			List Alliance		
Party		Votes	%	Seats	Votes	%	Seats
Liberal Party	V	19,103	25.99%	2	19,103	25.99%	2
Labour Party	Ap	18,354	24.97%	2	18,354	24.98%	2
Christian Democratic Party	KrF	15,340	20.87%	2	15,340	20.87%	2
Hordaland Voters Association (Conservative Party–Free-minded Liberal Party)	HV	8,583	11.68%	1	16,449	22.38%	2
Farmers' Party	Bp	7,872	10.71%	1	16,449	22.38%	2
Society Party	Samfp	3,660	4.98%	0	3,660	4.98%	0
Nasjonal Samling	NS	582	0.79%	0	582	0.79%	0
Valid votes		73,494	100.00%	8	73,488	100.00%	8
Rejected votes		425	0.57%				
Total polled		73,919	76.74%				
Registered electors		96,323					

As the list alliance was not entitled to more seats contesting as an alliance than it was contesting as individual parties, the distribution of seats was as party votes.

The following candidates were elected: Kornelius Bergsvik (Ap); Ivar Bleiklie (HV); Gustav B. Forstrøm (Ap); Nils Lavik (KrF); Knut Markhus (V); Olav Myklebust (V); Hans Svarstad (KrF); and Jakob Nilsson Vik (Bp).

===== 1933 =====
Results of the 1933 parliamentary election held on 16 October 1933:

Party		Party			List Alliance		
Party		Votes	%	Seats	Votes	%	Seats
Liberal Party	V	15,689	26.26%	3	15,689	26.27%	3
Labour Party	Ap	12,628	21.13%	2	12,628	21.14%	2
Christian Democratic Party	KrF	10,272	17.19%	2	10,272	17.20%	1
Farmers' Party	Bp	10,010	16.75%	1	10,010	16.76%	1
Hordaland Voters Association (Conservative Party–Free-minded Liberal Party)	HV	5,039	8.43%	0	7,502	12.56%	1
Civic Assembly Party	BS	2,480	4.15%	0	7,502	12.56%	1
Society Party	Samfp	1,873	3.13%	0	1,873	3.14%	0
Communist Party of Norway	K	1,758	2.94%	0	1,758	2.94%	0
Wild Votes		1	0.00%	0	1	0.00%	0
Valid votes		59,750	100.00%	8	59,733	100.00%	8
Rejected votes		309	0.51%				
Total polled		60,059	65.76%				
Registered electors		91,326					

As the list alliance was entitled to more seats contesting as an alliance than it was contesting as individual parties, the distribution of seats was as list alliance votes. The HV-BS list alliance's seat was allocated to the Hordaland Voters Association.

The following candidates were elected: Ivar Bleiklie (HV); Kornelius Bergsvik (Ap); Gustav B. Forstrøm (Ap); Mons A. Kårbø (V); Nils Lavik (KrF); Ole Monsen Mjelde (V); Olav Myklebust (V); and Jakob Nilsson Vik (Bp).

===== 1930 =====
Results of the 1930 parliamentary election held on 20 October 1930:

Party		Votes	%	Seats
Liberal Party	V	26,297	43.62%	4
Farmers' Party	Bp	12,203	20.24%	2
Hordaland Voters Association (Conservative Party–Free-minded Liberal Party)	HV	10,132	16.81%	1
Labour Party	Ap	9,596	15.92%	1
Communist Party of Norway	K	2,059	3.42%	0
Valid votes		60,287	100.00%	8
Rejected votes		253	0.42%	
Total polled		60,540	69.95%	
Registered electors		86,552		

The following candidates were elected: Kornelius Bergsvik (Ap); Andreas Johan Rasmusson Garnes (Bp); Mons A. Kårbø (V); Jon Jørundson Mannsåker (V); Ole Monsen Mjelde (V); Wilhelm Mohr (HV); Olav Myklebust (V); and Jakob Nilsson Vik (Bp).

==== 1920s ====
===== 1927 =====
Results of the 1927 parliamentary election held on 17 October 1927:

Party		Votes	%	Seats
Liberal Party	V	17,830	38.05%	4
Farmers' Party	Bp	10,210	21.79%	2
Labour Party	Ap	7,356	15.70%	1
Hordaland Voters Association (Conservative Party–Free-minded Liberal Party)	HV	7,092	15.13%	1
Communist Party of Norway	K	4,373	9.33%	0
Valid votes		46,861	100.00%	8
Rejected votes		500	1.06%	
Total polled		47,361	56.29%	
Registered electors		84,141		

The following candidates were elected: Kornelius Bergsvik (Ap); Andreas Johan Rasmusson Garnes (Bp); Jon Jørundson Mannsåker (V); Knut Markhus (V); Ole Monsen Mjelde (V); Olav Myklebust (V); Lauritz Tvedt (HV); and Jakob Nilsson Vik (Bp).

===== 1924 =====
Results of the 1924 parliamentary election held on 21 October 1924:

Party		Votes	%	Seats
Liberal Party	V	19,540	41.74%	4
Hordaland Voters Association (Conservative Party–Free-minded Liberal Party)	HV	10,489	22.41%	2
Farmers' Party	Bp	8,701	18.59%	1
Communist Party of Norway	K	5,108	10.91%	1
Social Democratic Labour Party of Norway	S	2,278	4.87%	0
Labour Party	Ap	695	1.48%	0
Wild Votes		3	0.01%	0
Valid votes		46,814	100.00%	8
Rejected votes		753	1.58%	
Total polled		47,567	59.76%	
Registered electors		79,596		

The following candidates were elected: Olaf Josefson Bjørgum (Bp); Ivar Johannesson Bleiklie (HV); Nils Johannessen Finne (V); Sverre Krogh (K); Knut Markhus (V); Ole Monsen Mjelde (V); Olav Myklebust (V); and Lauritz Tvedt (HV).

===== 1921 =====
Results of the 1921 parliamentary election held on 24 October 1921:

Party		Votes	%	Seats
Liberal Party	V	18,387	40.44%	4
Conservative Party–Free-minded Liberal Party	H-FV	9,815	21.59%	2
Norwegian Farmers' Association	L	8,997	19.79%	1
Labour Party	Ap	5,259	11.57%	1
Social Democratic Labour Party of Norway	S	1,705	3.75%	0
Farmers and Fishermen		1,234	2.71%	0
Wild Votes		69	0.15%	0
Valid votes		45,466	100.00%	8
Rejected votes		805	1.74%	
Total polled		46,271	59.53%	
Registered electors		77,727		

The following candidates were elected: Olaf Josefson Bjørgum (L); Sverre Krogh (Ap); Knut Markhus (V); Ole Monsen Mjelde (V); Wilhelm Mohr (H-FV); Olav Myklebust (V); Nils Nilsson Skaar (V); and Lauritz Tvedt (H-FV).
