= Standing Committee on Finance and Economic Affairs =

The Standing Committee on Finance and Economic Affairs (Norwegian: Finanskomiteen) is a standing committee of the Parliament of Norway. It is responsible for policies relating to economic policy, monetary and credit policy, the financial and credit system, financial administration, block grants to municipalities and counties, taxes and duties to the State Treasury, state guarantees for exports, National Insurance revenues, incomes policy (except for the Agricultural Agreement) and legislation relating to accounting and auditing. It corresponds to the Ministry of Finance. The committee has 18 members and is chaired by Hans Olav Syversen of the Christian Democratic Party.

Since the economic policy affects the resources available in all other policy areas, the Finance Committee is considered to be a powerful one, and in most cases, all parliamentary parties have at least one member on it. An exception was made in the 2013-2017 Parliament when Rasmus Hansson, the sole representative of the Green Party, asked to be seated on the Standing Committee on Energy and the Environment instead.

== Members 2013–2017 ==
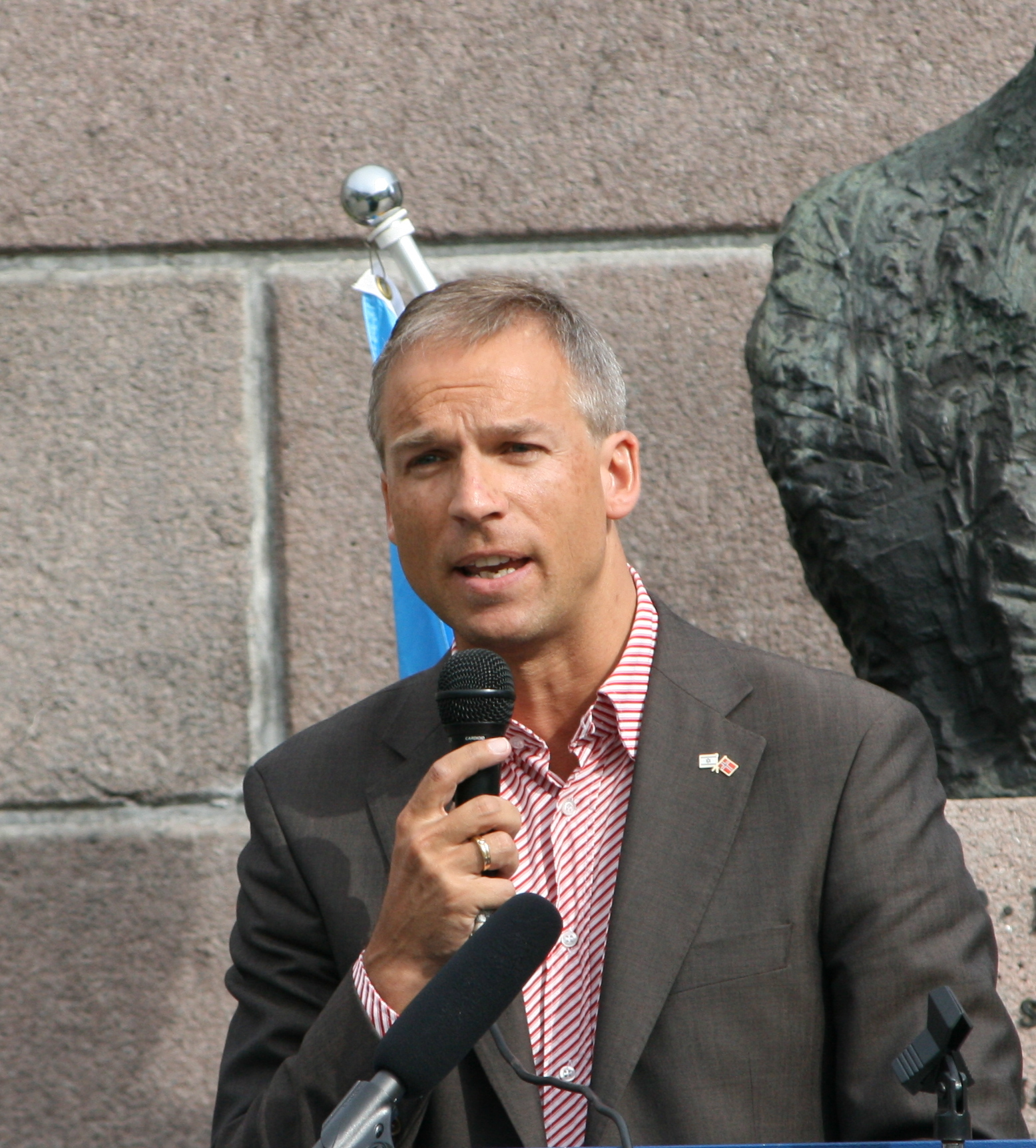
The committee is chaired by Hans Olav Syversen

Representative	Party	Position
Hans Olav Syversen	Christian Democrats	Chair
Jonas Gahr Støre	Labour	First deputy chair
Svein Flåtten	Conservative	Second deputy chair
Solveig Sundbø Abrahamsen	Conservative	
Lisbeth Berg-Hansen	Labour	
Terje Breivik	Liberal	
Tore Hagebakken	Labour	
Gjermund Hagesæter	Progress	
Sigurd Hille	Conservative	
Tom Holthe	Progress	
Irene Johansen	Labour	
Hans Andreas Limi	Progress	
Heidi Nordby Lunde	Conservative	
Marianne Marthinsen	Labour	
Siri A. Meling	Conservative	
Torstein Tvedt Solberg	Labour	
Snorre Serigstad Valen	Socialist Left	
Trygve Slagsvold Vedum	Centre	
