= Gjermund =

Gjermund is a given name. Notable people with the name include:

- Gjermund Åsen (born 1991), Norwegian footballer
- Gjermund Eggen (born 1941), Norwegian cross country skier
- Gjermund Hagesæter (born 1960), Norwegian politician
- Thor Gjermund Eriksen (born 1966), Norwegian journalist and editor
