= Laila Reiertsen =

Norwegian politician

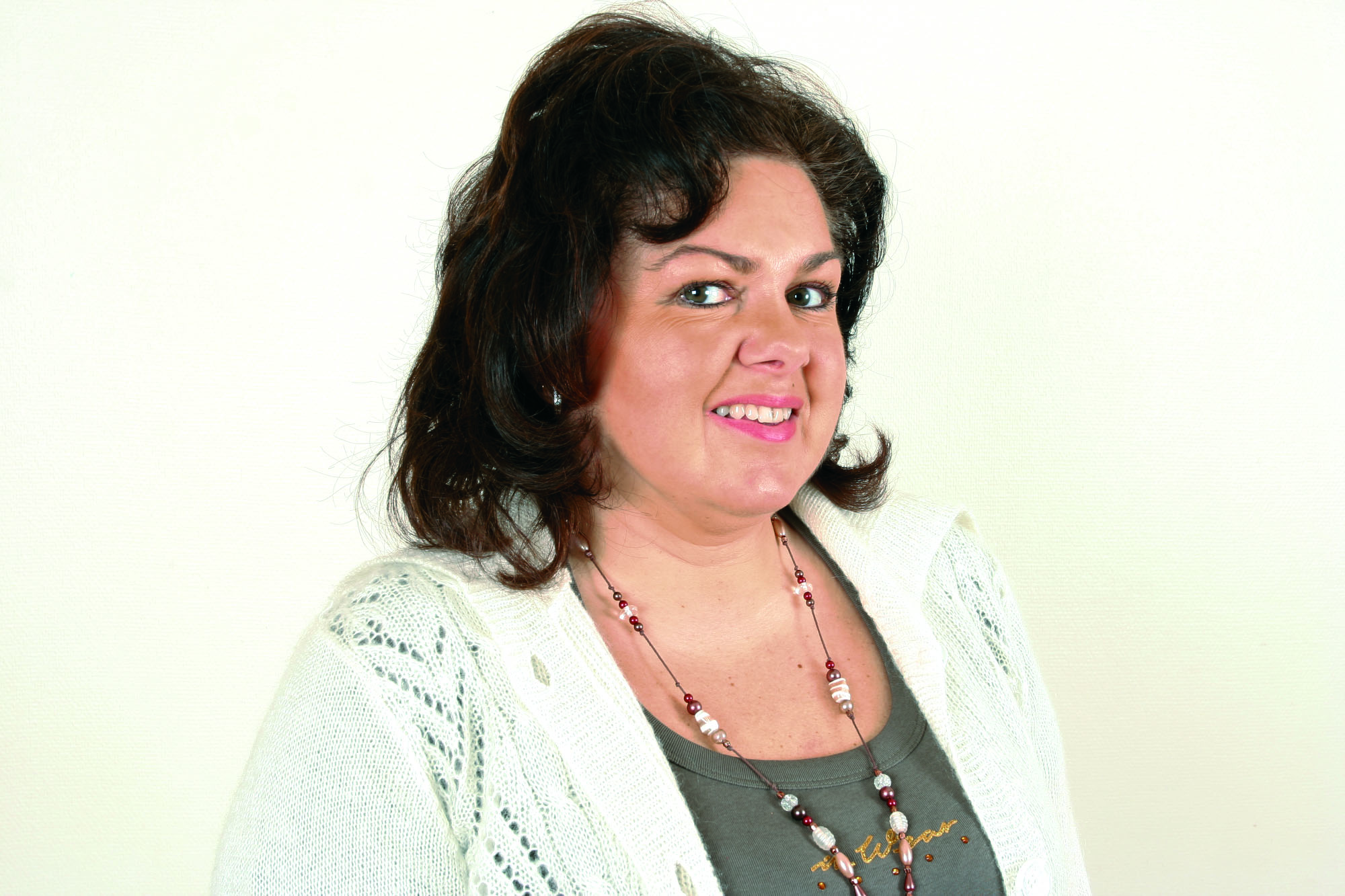

Member of Parliament for Hordaland
- Incumbent
- Assumed office 14 September 2009

Personal details
- Born: 19 October 1960 (age 65) Askøy Municipality, Norway
- Party: Progress Party
- Children: four
- Occupation: politician
- Profession: nurse

Laila Marie Reiertsen, née Bjørkhaug (born 19 October 1960) is a Norwegian politician from Hordaland, residing in Bjørnafjorden Municipality representing the Progress Party.

Reiertsen was born at Askøy Municipality in Hordaland in 1960 to Bjarne Bjørkhaug (born 1935) and Målfrid Mathilde Heggøy (born 1940). Reiertsen was married when she was sixteen years old to her one-year older husband. When she was seventeen, she gave birth to their first of four children. Reiertsen joined the Progress Party already in 1980, when she was twenty years old, and from 1987 to 1994 served as chairman of the Os chapter of the party. She finished her three-year education as a nurse at Betanien Nursing College in 1995.

Reiertsen worked at Haukeland University Hospital from 1995, then in various care facilities, both private and municipal. She led a unit in Bergen Hospital Trust from 2006 to 2007, headed a department at a care center in Os and led Ravneberghaugen Rehabilitation Center from 2009. She was elected to the municipal council of Os Municipality from 1995 to 2011 and deputy member of Hordaland county council from 2003 to 2011.

She served as a deputy representative to the Parliament of Norway during the term 2005–2009. Prior to the 2009 election, Reiertsen called care for the elderly her main issue. She has called for better funding of Helse Vest to stop the spectre of cutbacks in healthcare. Reiertsen has been critical of the Bergen Light Rail, and argued for more bus lanes instead. In the 2009 parliamentary election she won Hordaland's leveling seat, becoming her party's fourth representative in that county. She sat on the Standing Committee on Labour and Social Affairs.

In the 2013 election she again became a deputy representative. In June 2015 she advanced to regular representative again, covering for Gjermund Hagesæter who became State Secretary.
