= Magne Rommetveit =

Norwegian politician (born 1956)

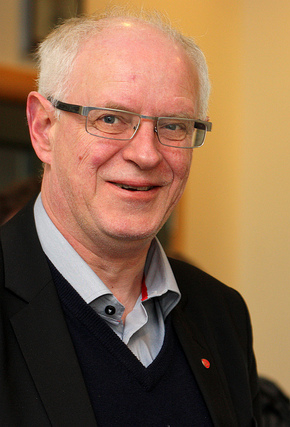
Magne Rommetveit

Magne Rommetveit (born 27 April 1956) is a Member of Parliament for the Norwegian Labour Party. Rommetveit is elected from Hordaland County. He was formerly Mayor (1992–2007) and Assistant City Administrator (2008–2009) of Stord Municipality.

Magne Rommetveit grew up in Time Municipality in Jæren, where his father worked as a teacher. Rommetveit is also a teacher, and has a background in youth work.

Political offices
Preceded by Werner Hagerup	Mayor of Stord Municipality; 1991-2007	Succeeded by Liv Kari Eskeland
