= Thor Myklebust =

Norwegian politician

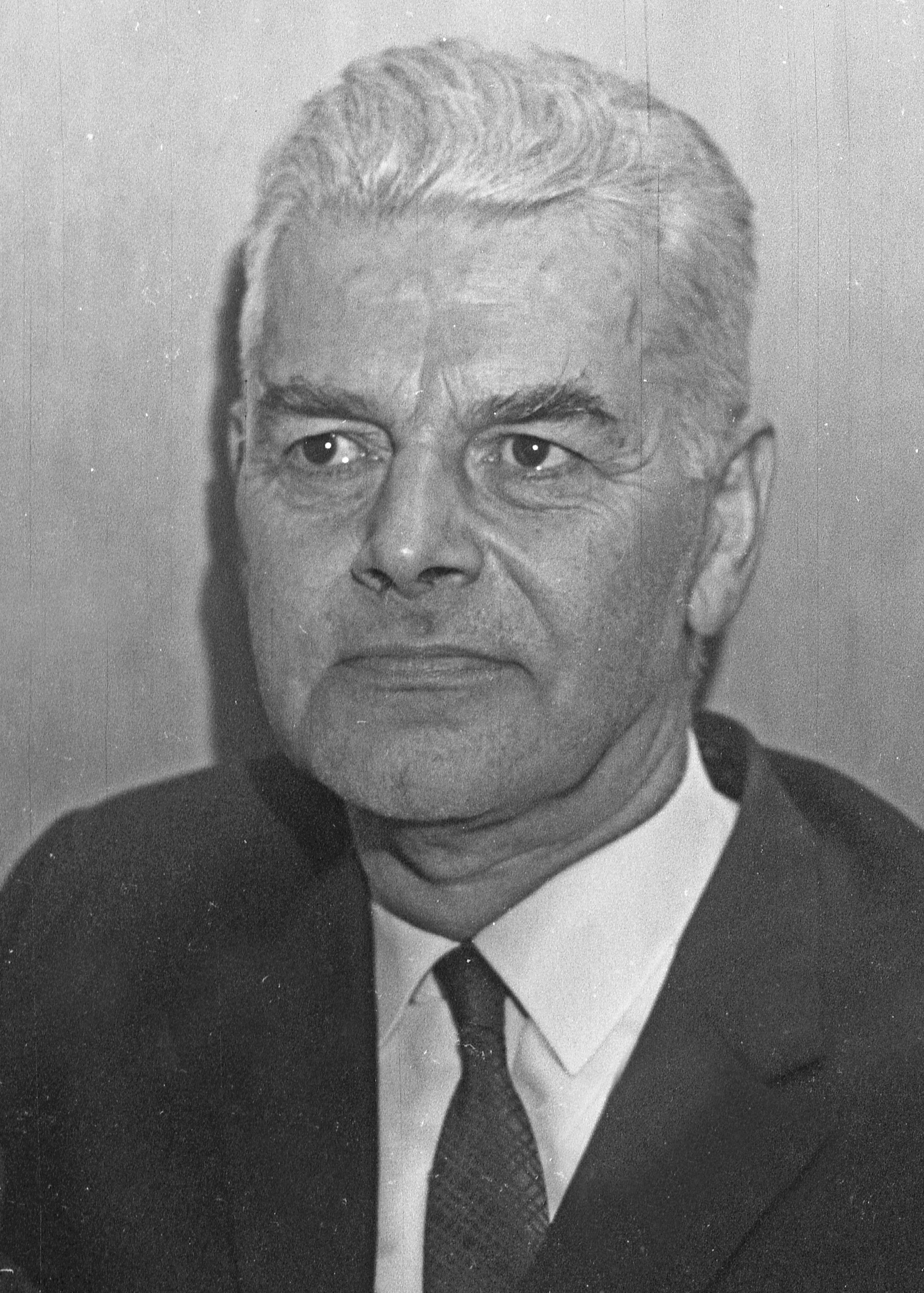
Thor Myklebust

Thor Myklebust (30 June 1908 – 11 January 1989) was a Norwegian politician for the Liberal Party and later the Liberal People's Party.

He was elected to the Norwegian Parliament from Hordaland in 1965, and was re-elected on one occasion. During his second term, in December 1972, Myklebust joined the Liberal People's Party which split from the Liberal Party over disagreements of Norway's proposed entry to the European Economic Community. He had previously served in the position of deputy representative during the terms 1954–1957 and 1961–1965, and later served in the same position during the term 1973–1977.

Myklebust was born in Kvinnherad Municipality and held various positions on the municipal council of Kvinnherad Municipality from 1945 to 1963.
