= Ole Jensen Rong =

Norwegian politician

Ole Jensen Rong (26 November 1885 – 18 July 1953) was a Norwegian politician for the Labour Party.

He was born in Herlø Municipality (later spelled Herdla). He was elected to the Norwegian Parliament from Hordaland in 1945, and was re-elected on one occasion. He had previously served in the position of deputy representative during the terms 1934–1936 and 1937–1945. Towards the end of his second term in Parliament, he died and was replaced by Knut Severin Jakobsen Vik.

Rong held various positions on the municipal council for Herdla Municipality from 1928 to 1947, except for the years 1940–1945, during World War II.
