= Steffen Toppe =

Norwegian politician

Steffen Ingebriktsen Toppe (12 October 1902 – 28 July 1979) was a Norwegian politician for the Labour Party.

He was born in Hamre Municipality. Toppe was elected to the Norwegian Parliament from Hordaland in 1965. He had previously served as a deputy representative in the periods 1958–1961 and 1961–, shortly into which the regular representative Hjalmar Olai Storeide died and was replaced by Toppe. He was not re-elected in 1969.

Toppe was a member of the municipal council of Åsane Municipality from 1933 until 1961, except during the years of World War II. He served as deputy mayor in 1945–1947, 1947–1951, 1951–1953, 1955–1959, and 1959–1961 with a short spell as mayor in 1954–1955.
