= Leiv Stensland =

Norwegian politician (1934–2020)

Leiv Stensland (6 May 1934, Odda Municipality – 3 May 2020) was a Norwegian politician for the Labour Party.

Stensland was a member of the municipal council for Odda Municipality from 1959 to 1975 and 1979 to 1985, serving the last period as mayor. He was elected to the Parliament of Norway from Hordaland in 1985, and was re-elected on one occasion, serving until 1993.

Outside of politics he worked as an electrician from 1953 to 1978. He chaired Odda Electricians' Union from 1960 to 1969 and was a national board member of the Norwegian Union of Electricians and Power Station Officials from 1958 to 1970.
