= Sigurd Hille =

Norwegian politician (born 1950)

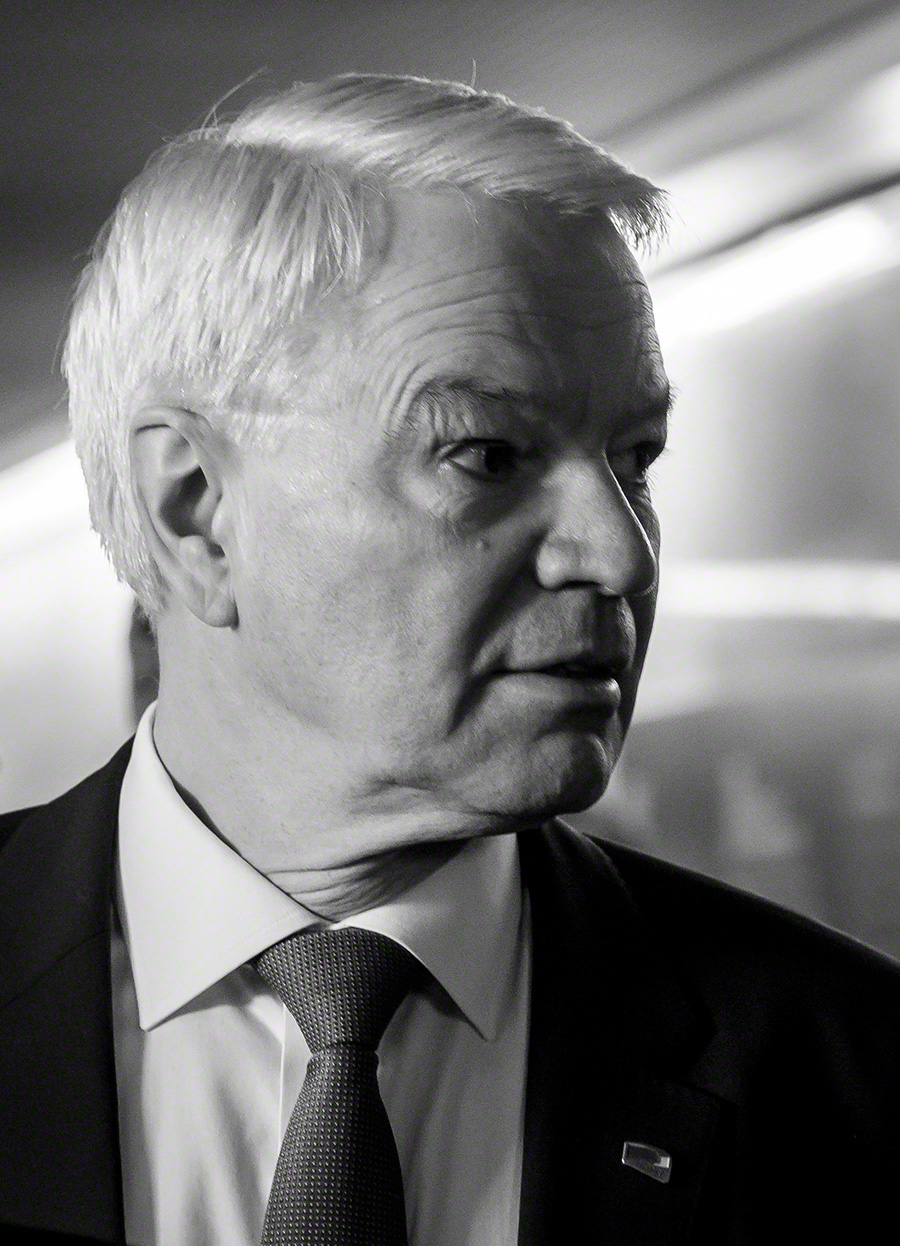
- Hille in 2016
- Born: 6 May 1950 (age 75)
- Occupation: Politician
- Known for: Member of the Storting
- Spouse: Torill Eidsheim

Sigurd Hille (born 6 May 1950) is a Norwegian politician for the Conservative Party. He was elected to the Parliament of Norway from Hordaland in 2013 where he was a member of the Standing Committee on Finance and Economic Affairs until 2017.

He is married to Torill Eidsheim.
