= Kjeld Langeland =

Norwegian politician (1920–1973)

Kjeld Langeland (9 August 1920 – 25 January 1973) was a Norwegian politician for the Conservative Party.

He was born in Bergen. He was elected to the Norwegian Parliament from Hordaland in 1965, and was re-elected on two occasions. Towards the end of his second term, he died and was replaced by Sigrid Utkilen.

Langeland was a member of the municipal council of Åsane Municipality between 1955 and 1971, serving as mayor in the periods 1959–1963 and 1963–1965. He chaired the municipal party chapter from 1956 to 1960. He was then a member of the municipal council of Bergen Municipality between 1971 until his death, which happened on 25 January 1973.
