= Ågot Valle =

Norwegian politician

Ågot Jorunn Valle (born 26 May 1945 in Levanger) is a Norwegian politician for the Socialist Left Party (SV). She was elected to the Norwegian Parliament from Hordaland in 1997.

She worked as a physiotherapist and a county council member in Hordaland before entering national politics. She has also been involved in the organization Nei til EU (No to the EU).

She was member of the Norwegian Nobel Committee from 2009 until 2014, the body that awards the Nobel Peace Prize.

== Parliamentary Presidium duties ==
- 2001 – 2005 President of the Odelsting.

== Parliamentary Committee duties ==
- 2005 – 2009 member of the Enlarged Foreign Affairs Committee.
- 2005 – 2009 member of the Standing Committee on Foreign Affairs.
- 2001 – 2005 leader of the Standing Committee on Scrutiny and Constitutional Affairs.
- 2001 – 2005 deputy member of the Enlarged Foreign Affairs Committee.
- 1997 – 2001 deputy leader of the Standing Committee on Family and Cultural Affairs.
- 1997 – 2001 deputy member of the Electoral Committee.
