= Olav Hordvik =

Norwegian politician

Mayor of Hamre Municipality
- In office 1937–1938

Mayor of Åsane Municipality
- In office 1945–1955

Member of the Storting from Hordaland
- In office 1954–1969

Personal details
- Born: 26 December 1901 Hamre Municipality, Norway
- Died: 6 August 1979 (aged 77)
- Party: Venstre (Liberal Party)

Olav Hordvik (26 December 1901 – 6 August 1979) was a Norwegian politician for the Liberal Party.

He was elected to the Norwegian Parliament from Hordaland in 1954, and was re-elected on three occasions. He had previously served as a deputy representative in the period 1950–1953.

Hordvik was born in Hamre Municipality in Søndre Bergenhus county, Norway. He was elected mayor of Hamre Municipality in 1937–1938, and mayor of Åsane Municipality in the periods 1945–1947, 1947–1951 and 1951–1955.
