= Rita Tveiten =

Norwegian politician

Rita Tveiten (born 22 January 1954, in Bergen) is a Norwegian politician for the Labour Party.

She was elected to the Norwegian Parliament from Hordaland in 1993, and was re-elected on one occasion. She served as a deputy representative during the terms 1989–1993 and 2001–2005. Three years into the second term as deputy, she replaced the regular representative Leif Lund who died.

Tveiten was a member of the municipal council of Osterøy Municipality from 1983 to 1987. During this term she was also a member of Hordaland County Council.
