= Ove Bernt Trellevik =

Norwegian politician

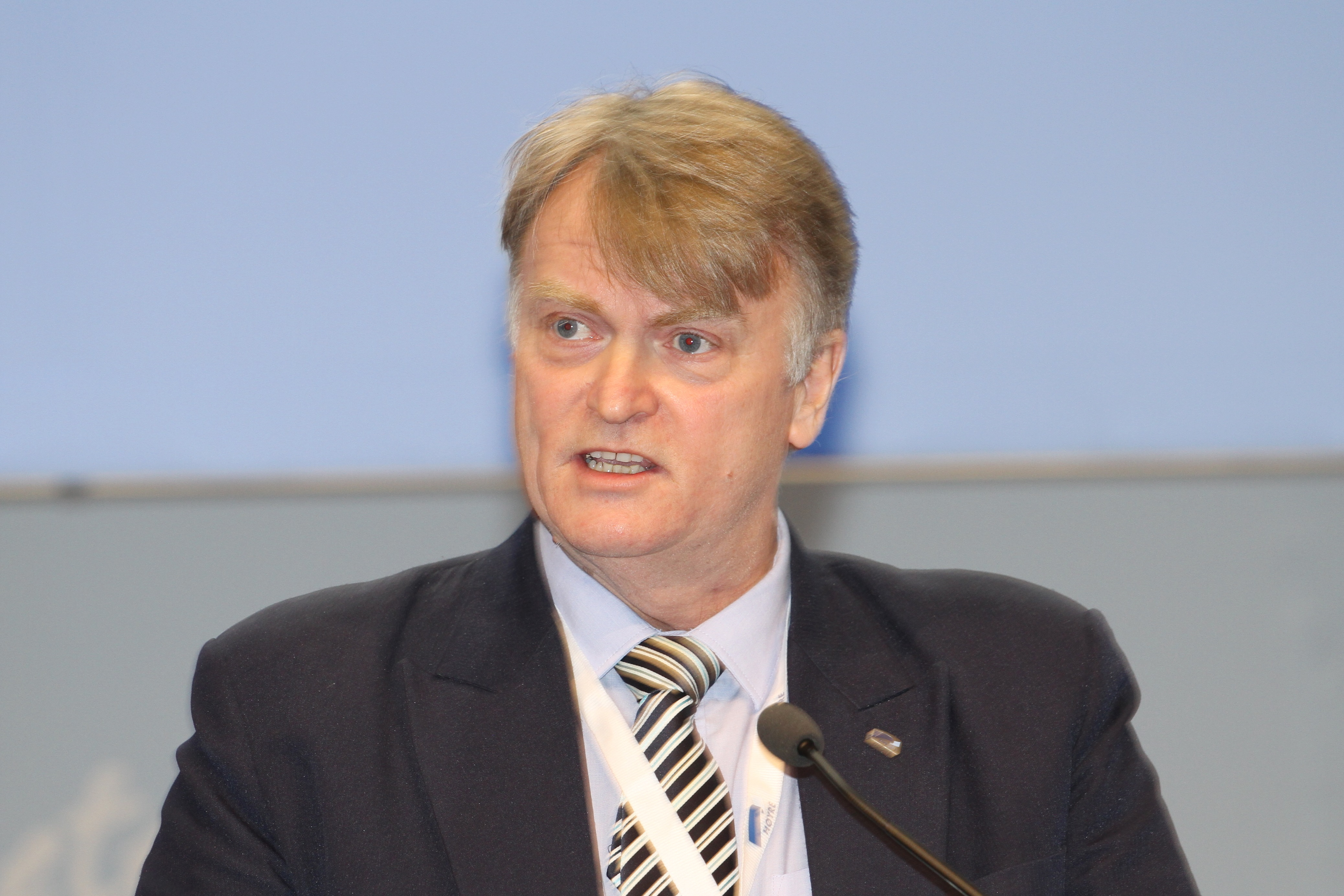
- Trellevik in 2017

Member of the Storting
- Incumbent
- Assumed office 1 October 2013
- Constituency: Hordaland

Third Vice President of the Storting
- Incumbent
- Assumed office 10 October 2025
- President: Masud Gharahkhani (Ap)
- Preceded by: Morten Wold (FrP)

Mayor of Sund Municipality
- In office 8 November 2010 – 12 October 2013
- Preceded by: Albrigt Sangolt (H)
- Succeeded by: Kari-Anne Landro (H)

Personal details
- Born: 15 August 1965 (age 60) Bergen, Hordaland, Norway
- Party: Conservative
- Education: Military officer Economist
- Alma mater: Royal Norwegian Naval Academy; Norwegian School of Economics
- Occupation: Politician

Ove Bernt Trellevik (born 15 August 1965) is a Norwegian military officer, economist, and politician for the Conservative Party. A former officer in the Royal Norwegian Navy and former mayor of Sund Municipality, he has been member of the Storting from the constituency of Hordaland since 2013.

== Personal life, education and early career ==
Trellevik was born in Bergen on 15 August 1965, a son of Åsmund Trellevik and Anne Marie Trellevik. He was first educated as chef, and is further educated both as military officer from the Royal Norwegian Naval Academy, and economist from the Norwegian School of Economics.

He was appointed officer in the Royal Norwegian Navy from 1985 to 2001, and was assigned with the Norwegian Defence Logistics Organization from 2001 to 2006. From 2006 to 2010 he was assigned as special advisor for the power company BKK.

== Political career ==
=== Local politics ===
Trellevik was elected member of the municipal council of Sund Municipality from 2007 to 2015, and served as mayor in Sund Municipality from 2010 to 2013. He has additionally been the chairman of the board of Regionrådet Vest, Nordsjøfartmuseet and Kystsogevekene and a board member of the foundation Museum Vest.

=== Parliament ===
He was elected as a regular representative to the Storting from Hordaland in 2013. He was re-elected in 2017, 2021 and 2025.

In paleiament, he sat on the Standing Committee on Business and Industry from 2013 to 2017, the Standing Committee on Local Government and Public Administration from 2017 to 2021, and of the Standing Committee on Energy and the Environment from 2021 to 2025. He was a member of the Storting delegation to the Inter-Parliamentary Union from 2017 to 2021, and a delegate to the United Nations General Assembly from 2018 to 2019. In 2025, he became the third vice president of the Storting.
