= Knut Severin Jakobsen Vik =

Norwegian politician

Knut Severin Jakobsen Vik (23 February 1892 – 16 July 1972) was a Norwegian politician for the Labour Party.

He was elected to the Norwegian Parliament from Hordaland in 1954, and was re-elected on one occasion. He had previously served in the position of deputy representative during the term 1950–1953. During this term he served temporarily as a regular representative meanwhile Jakob Martin Pettersen were appointed to the Cabinet, until July 1953 when the death of Ole Jensen Rong meant that Moe moved up in the hierarchy to be considered a full representative. Pettersen was instead covered by another former deputy representative Gurid Almenningen.

Jakobsen Vik was born in Bruvik and a member of the municipal council of Bruvik Municipality from 1931 to 1939, and after World War II he served as mayor from 1945 to 1957. From 1945 to 1950 he was also a member of the Hordaland County Council.
