= Magnus Stangeland =

Norwegian politician

Magnus Stangeland (born 17 March 1941 in Austevoll Municipality) is a Norwegian politician for the Centre Party.

He was elected to the Norwegian Parliament from Hordaland in 1985, and was re-elected on two occasions. He had previously served in the position of deputy representative during the term 1981–1985.

Stangeland was a member of the municipal council of Austevoll Municipality from 1971 to 1983, serving as mayor in the periods 1975–1979 and 1979–1981. From 1981 to 1983 he was also a member of the Hordaland county council.

In a lower court, he had been sentenced to 60 days in prison on charges of fraud. In 2011, Borgarting Court of Appeal acquitted him on charges of fraud. He was ordered to pay Norwegian kroner 100,000 for court costs. Riksadvokaten has appealed for the case to be tried by the Supreme Court.

Political offices
Preceded by John S. Tveit	Chair of the Standing Committee on Transport; 1993–1997	Succeeded by Oddvard Nilsen
