= Kjellbjørg Lunde =

Norwegian politician

Kjellbjørg Lunde (born 26 November 1944 in Naustdal Municipality) is a Norwegian politician for the Socialist Left Party.

== Career ==
She was elected to the Norwegian Parliament from Hordaland in 1981, and was re-elected on three occasions.

Lunde was a member of the municipal council for Stord Municipality in the periods 1975–1979 and 1979–1981.

== See also ==
- List of members of the Storting, 1981–1985
