= Stig Abrahamsen =

Norwegian politician (born 1987)

Member of the Storting
- Incumbent
- Assumed office 1 October 2025
- Constituency: Hordaland

Personal details
- Born: 27 March 1987 (age 39)
- Party: Progress

Stig Atle Abrahamsen (born 27 March 1987) is a Norwegian politician for the Progress Party (FrP).

Abrahamsen hails from Strusshamn. He first became a deputy member of the municipal council of Askøy Municipality in the 2007 Norwegian local elections, aged 20. He was a member from 2011 and re-elected on three straight occasions; from 2023 he was also a member of Hordaland county council. He was elected as a deputy representative to the Parliament of Norway from Hordaland for the terms 2017–2021 and 2021–2025.
