= Christian L. Holm =

Norwegian politician (1892–1981)

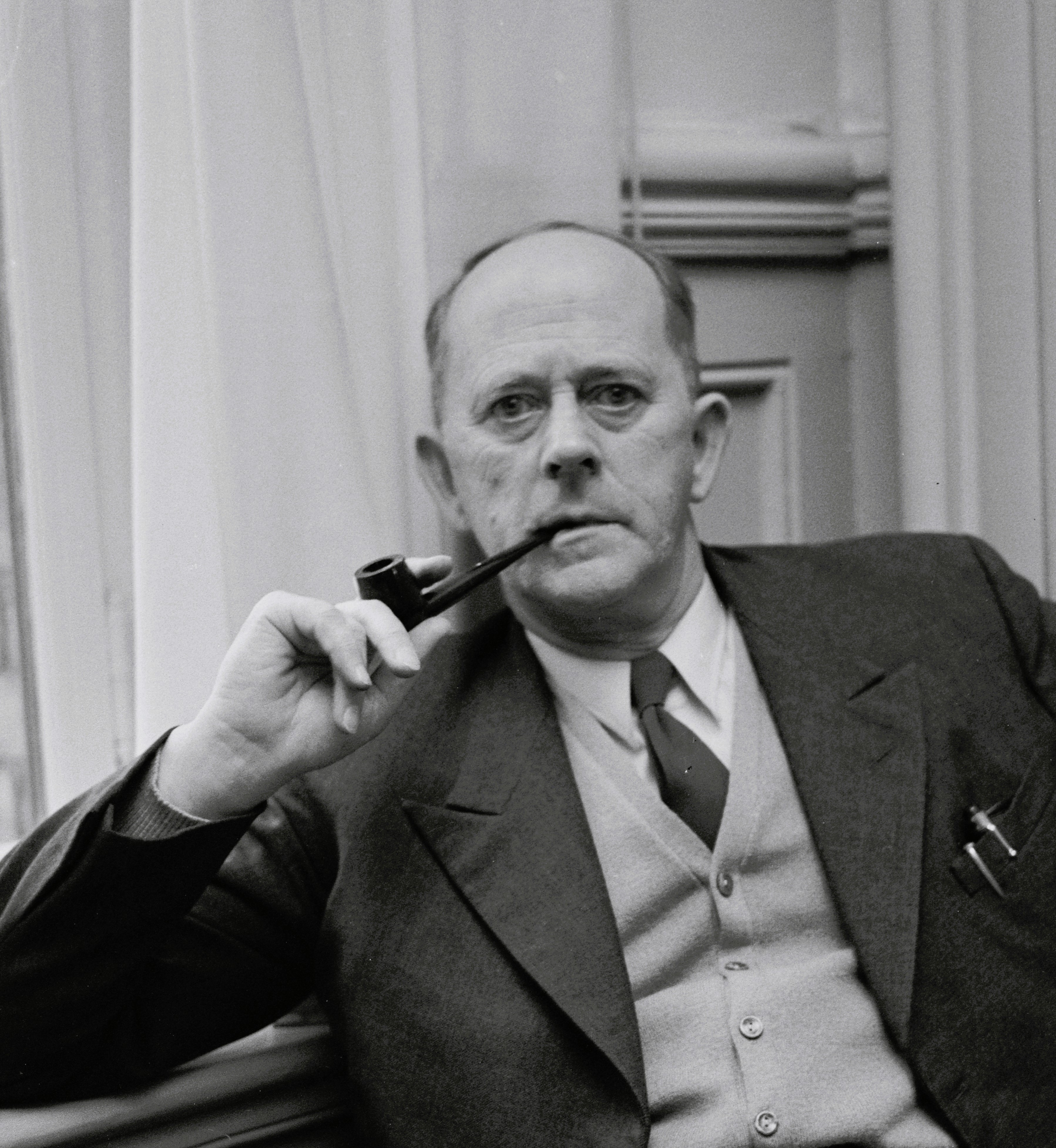
Christian L. Holm (1954)

Lorentz Christian Langberg Holm (6 May 1892 – 30 March 1981) was a Norwegian politician for the Conservative Party.

He was born in Rakkestad Municipality in Østfold county, Norway.

He was elected to the Norwegian Parliament from Hordaland in 1950, and was re-elected on three occasions. He had previously served as a deputy representative in the period 1945–1949.

Holm was deputy mayor of Kvinnherad Municipality in 1945–1947.
