= Nils O. Golten =

Norwegian politician

Nils O. Golten (11 May 1936 – 26 March 1999) was a Norwegian politician for the Conservative Party.

He was elected to the Norwegian Parliament from Hordaland in 1985, and was re-elected on one occasion. He had previously served in the position of deputy representative during the term 1981–1985.

Golten was born in Sund Municipality. He was a member of the municipal council of Sund Municipality in the periods 1971–1975, 1975–1979 and 1979–1983.
