= Nils Tveit =

Norwegian politician

Nils Tveit (8 January 1876 – 13 July 1949) was a Norwegian politician for the Liberal Party.

He was elected to the Norwegian Parliament from Hordaland in 1945, but died shortly before the end of the term. He was replaced by Knut Ytre-Arne. He had previously served in the position of deputy representative during the terms 1925–1927, 1928–1930, 1931–1933, 1934–1936 and 1937–1945.

Tveit was born in Os Municipality and mayor of Os Municipality from 1916 to 1940 as well as a brief period in 1945. In addition he was deputy chairman of Hordaland county council during the terms 1928–1931, 1934–1937 and 1937–1940, and mayor in 1931–1934.
