= Martin Jonsterhaug =

Norwegian politician (born 2000)

Member of the Storting
- Incumbent
- Assumed office 1 October 2025
- Constituency: Hordaland

Personal details
- Born: 9 August 2000 (age 25)
- Party: Progress Party

Martin Virkesdal Jonsterhaug (born 9 August 2000) is a Norwegian politician who was elected member of the Storting in 2025. From 2021 to 2025, he was a deputy member of the Storting.
