= Ingebrigt S. Sørfonn =

Norwegian politician

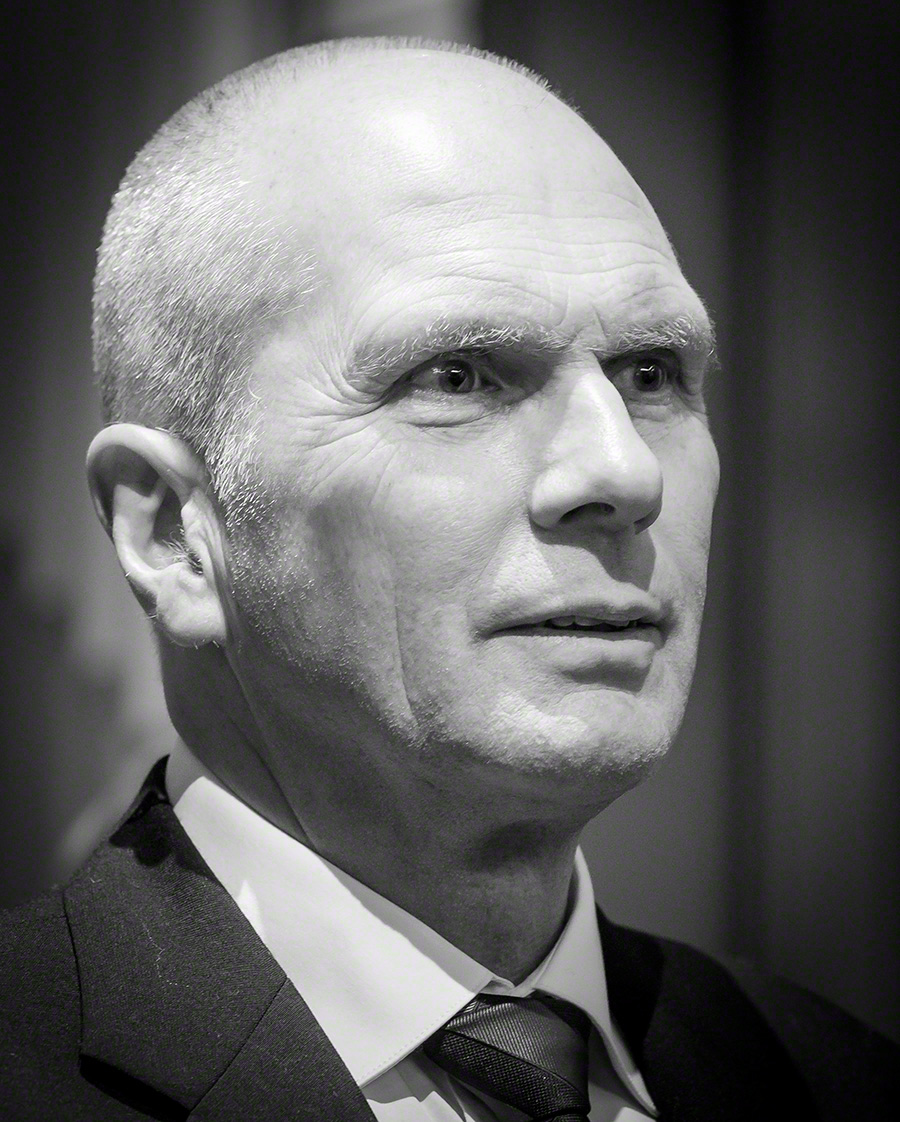
Ingebrigt S. Sørfonn in 2016

Ingebrigt S. Sørfonn (born 27 May 1950) is a Norwegian politician representing the Christian Democratic Party. He was a representative of Hordaland in the Storting from 1997 until 2009.

Sørfonn was previously the mayor of Fitjar Municipality from 1979 to 1981, and again from 1986 to 1987.

Sørfonn became the leader of the lobby group Friends of Israel in the Parliament of Norway after the 2005 parliamentary election.

== Storting committees ==
- 2005–2009 member of the Business committee.
- 2001–2005 second deputy leader of the Finance committee.
- 2001–2005 member of the Extended Foreign Affairs committee.
- 2005–2009 member of the Finance committee.
