= Britt Harkestad =

Norwegian politician

Britt Harkestad (born 9 March 1946 in Kvam) is a Norwegian politician for the Christian Democratic Party.

She was elected to the Norwegian Parliament from Hordaland in 1985, and was re-elected on one occasion.

Harkestad was a member of the executive committee of the municipal council of Kvinnherad Municipality during the term 1979–1983, and a member of Hordaland county council from 1983 to 1987.
