= Silje Hjemdal =

Norwegian politician

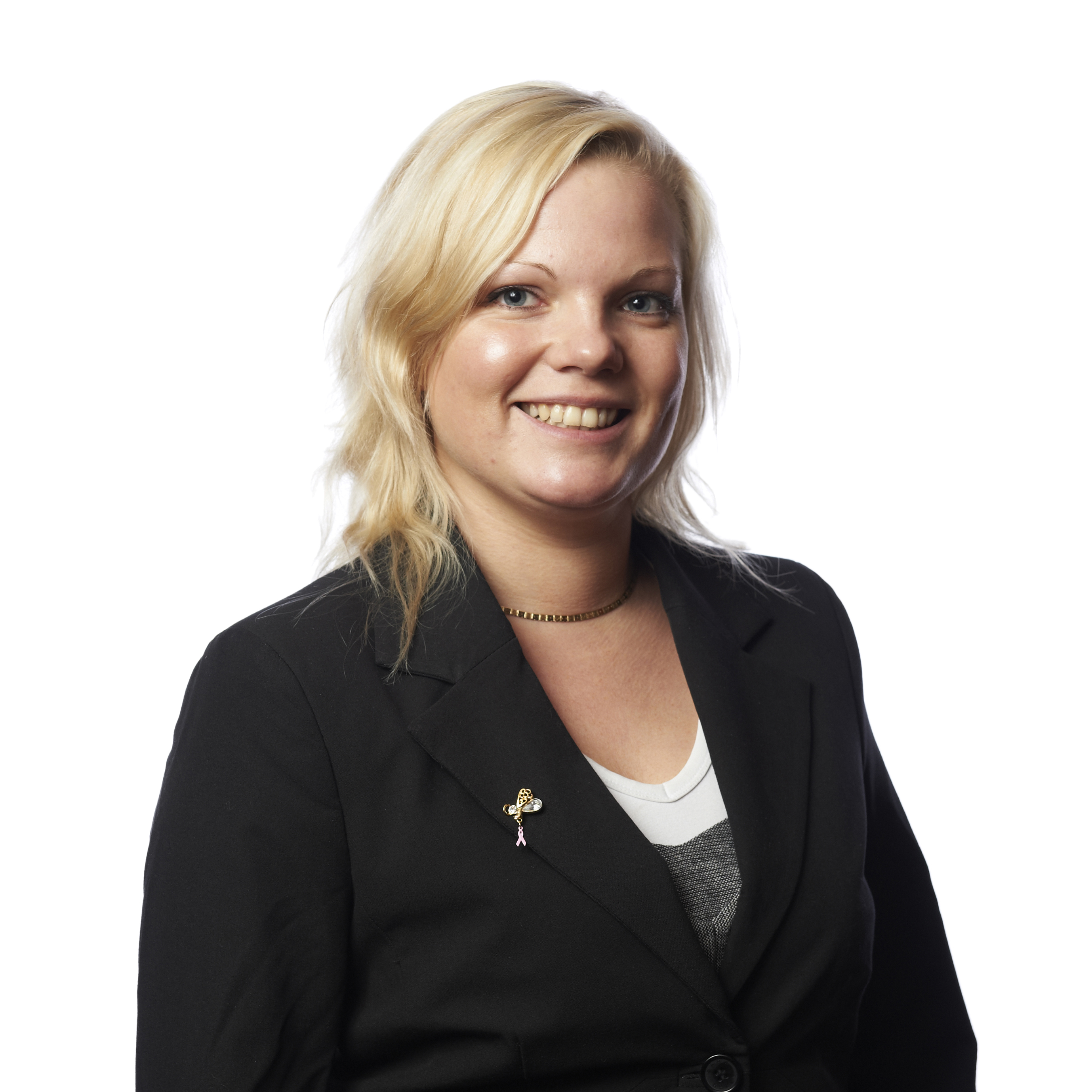

Member of the Storting
- Incumbent
- Assumed office 1 October 2017
- Constituency: Hordaland

Personal details
- Born: 8 August 1984 (age 41)
- Party: Progress
- Occupation: Politician

Silje Hjemdal (born 8 August 1984) is a Norwegian politician. She was elected representative to the Storting for the period 2017–2021 for the Progress Party (FrP) and was re-elected in 2025 for a new period.
