= Aksel Fossen =

Norwegian politician

Aksel Fossen (29 November 1919 – 31 August 2009) was a Norwegian politician for the Labour Party.

== Biography ==
Fossen was born in Strand Municipality, Norway. He was elected to the Norwegian Parliament from Hordaland in 1969, and was re-elected on three occasions.

On the local level he was a member of the municipal council for Odda Municipality from 1959 to 1971, serving as deputy mayor from 1962 to 1969. From 1963 to 1967 he was also a member of Hordaland County Council.

Outside politics he was a factory worker in Odda.
