= Isak Larsson Flatabø =

Norwegian politician

Isak Larsson Flatabø (11 September 1896 – 22 January 1969) was a Norwegian politician for the Labour Party.

He was born in Vikør Municipality. He was elected to the Norwegian Parliament from Hordaland in 1945, and was re-elected on four occasions. He had previously served as a deputy representative in the periods 1934–1936 and 1937–1945.

On the local level, Flatabø was a member of the municipal council of Kvam Municipality from 1927 to 1940. He chaired the local party chapter from 1933 to 1934, and the county chapter from 1953 to 1958.

Outside politics he worked as a manual laborer and as a farmer. He was active in the International Organisation of Good Templars.
