= Hilde Magnusson Lydvo =

Norwegian politician

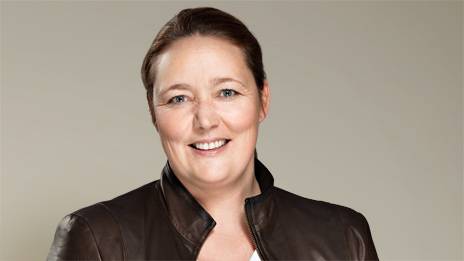
Hilde Magnusson Lydvo

Hilde Magnusson Lydvo (born 11 June 1970 in Narvik) is a Norwegian politician for the Labour Party.

She was elected to the Norwegian Parliament from Hordaland in 2005.

On the local level she was a deputy member of the executive committee of the municipal council of Voss Municipality from 1999 to 2003. Since 2003 she is deputy leader of the county party chapter since 2003, as well as a member of the Labour Party national board.

Outside politics she graduated as cand.jur. in 2000, having studied in Oslo, Bergen and Copenhagen. She worked as a lawyer from 2000 to 2005.
