= Sverre L. Mo =

Norwegian politician

Sverre L. Mo (25 January 1915 – 10 October 2002) was a Norwegian politician for the Christian Democratic Party.

He was elected to the Norwegian Parliament from Hordaland in 1965, and was re-elected on three occasions. He had previously served in the position of deputy representative during the terms 1954–1957, 1958–1961 and 1961–1965.

Mo was born in Kvam Municipality and was involved in local politics in Kvam Municipality from 1951 to 1954 and later 1959 to 1973.
