= Knut Ytre-Arne =

Norwegian politician

Knut Ytre-Arne (19 December 1896 – 30 March 1968) was a Norwegian politician for the Liberal Party.

He was born in Haus Municipality. He was elected to the Norwegian Parliament from Hordaland in 1950, and was re-elected on three occasions. He had previously served as the deputy representative in the period 1945–1949, but toward the end of this term, representative Nils Tveit died and was replaced by Ytre-Arne as a regular representative.

Ytre-Arne was deputy mayor of Fana Municipality in the periods 1945–1947, 1947–1951, and 1951–1955.
