= Sverre Helland =

Norwegian politician

Sverre Helland (18 September 1924, in Hamre Municipality – 31 December 2007) was a Norwegian politician for the Centre Party.

He was elected to the Norwegian Parliament from Hordaland in 1969, and was re-elected on three occasions. He had previously served as a deputy representative during the terms 1954–1957 and 1958–1961.

On the local level he was a member of the municipal council for Hamre Municipality from 1951 to 1955, then of the executive committee of the municipal council of Lindås Municipality from 1963 to 1971, serving as mayor from 1967 to 1969. From 1966 to 1967 he was also a member of Hordaland County Council.

Outside politics he worked as an electrician.
