= Ranveig Frøiland =

Norwegian politician (1945–2020)

Minister of Petroleum and Energy
- In office 18 December 1996 – 17 October 1997
- Prime Minister: Thorbjørn Jagland
- Preceded by: Grete Faremo
- Succeeded by: Marit Arnstad

Member of the Norwegian Parliament
- In office 1 October 1985 – 30 September 2005
- Constituency: Hordaland

Personal details
- Born: Ranveig Hjørdis Frøiland; 15 September 1945 Sund Municipality, Hordaland, Norway
- Died: 16 March 2020 (aged 74)
- Party: Labour

Ranveig Hjørdis Frøiland (15 September 1945 – 16 March 2020) was a Norwegian politician for the Labour Party. She was Minister of Industry and Energy (energy affairs) in 1996, and Minister of Petroleum and Energy in 1997. Later she served as Chairman of the Board of the Bergen Health Trust.

Political offices
Preceded by Grete Faremo	Norwegian Minister of Petroleum and Energy; 1996–1997	Succeeded by Marit Arnstad
