= Hjalmar Olai Storeide =

Norwegian politician

Hjalmar Olai Storeide (10 August 1901 – 21 November 1961) was a Norwegian politician for the Labour Party.

He was born in Hjørundfjord Municipality.

He was elected to the Norwegian Parliament from Hordaland in 1954, and was re-elected on two occasions. Shortly into his third term, he died and was replaced by Steffen Ingebriktsen Toppe.

Storeide was a member of the municipal council for Solund Municipality from 1945–1947, and deputy mayor of Moster Municipality from 1951–1955.
