= John Dale (Norwegian politician) =

Norwegian politician

- Born: 22 March 1940 (age 86); Vaksdal, Norway
- Occupation: Politician
- Political party: Centre Party

John Dale (born 22 March 1940) is a Norwegian politician.

== Biography ==
Dale was born in Vaksdal to Ole J. Dale and Anna Sääv. He was elected representative to the Storting for the period 1993–1997 for the Centre Party, from the constituency of Hordaland, and re-elected for the period 1997–2001.

He was a teacher at Voss High School from 2001 until his retirement in 2008.

== Parliamentary committees ==
1997–2001: Alternate member of the Expanded Foreign Affairs Committee

1997–2001: Member of the Expanded Foreign Affairs Committee

1997–2001: Member of the Energy and Environment Committee

1997–2001 Alternate Member of the Expanded Foreign Affairs Committee

1993–1997 Member of the Foreign Affairs Committee

1993–1997 Member of the Expanded Foreign Affairs Committee
