= Arne Alsåker Spilde =

Norwegian politician (1937–2024)

Arne Alsåker Spilde (18 April 1937 – 14 March 2024) was a Norwegian politician for the Conservative Party.

Spilde was elected to the Norwegian Parliament from Hordaland in 1981, and was re-elected on two occasions. He had previously served as a deputy representative during the terms 1973–1977 and 1977–1981, and later served in the same position from 1993–1997.

Spilde was a member of the executive committee of the municipal council for Ullensvang Municipality in the periods 1975–1977 and 1977–1979.

Spilde died on 14 March 2024, at the age of 86.
