= Torstein Kvamme =

Norwegian politician

Torstein Kvamme (14 March 1893 – 26 June 1985) was a Norwegian politician for the Christian Democratic Party.

He was born in Vossestrand Municipality. He was elected to the Norwegian Parliament from Hordaland in 1954, and was re-elected on two occasions. He had previously served as a deputy representative in the periods 1945–1949 and 1950–1953.

Kvamme was involved in local politics in Voss Municipality from 1931 to 1940.
