= Hans Svarstad =

Norwegian politician

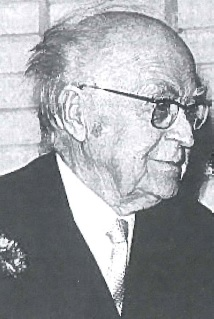

Hans Svarstad (11 July 1883 – 1 April 1971) was a Norwegian politician for the Christian Democratic Party.

He was born in Innvik Municipality. He was elected to the Norwegian Parliament from Hordaland in 1937, and was re-elected on two occasions. Svarstad was a member of municipal council of Kvam Municipality from 1922 to 1931.

Outside politics he worked as a school teacher. He was the local churchwarden for twenty years, and was active in the temperance movement.
