= Tom-Christer Nilsen =

Norwegian politician (born 1969)

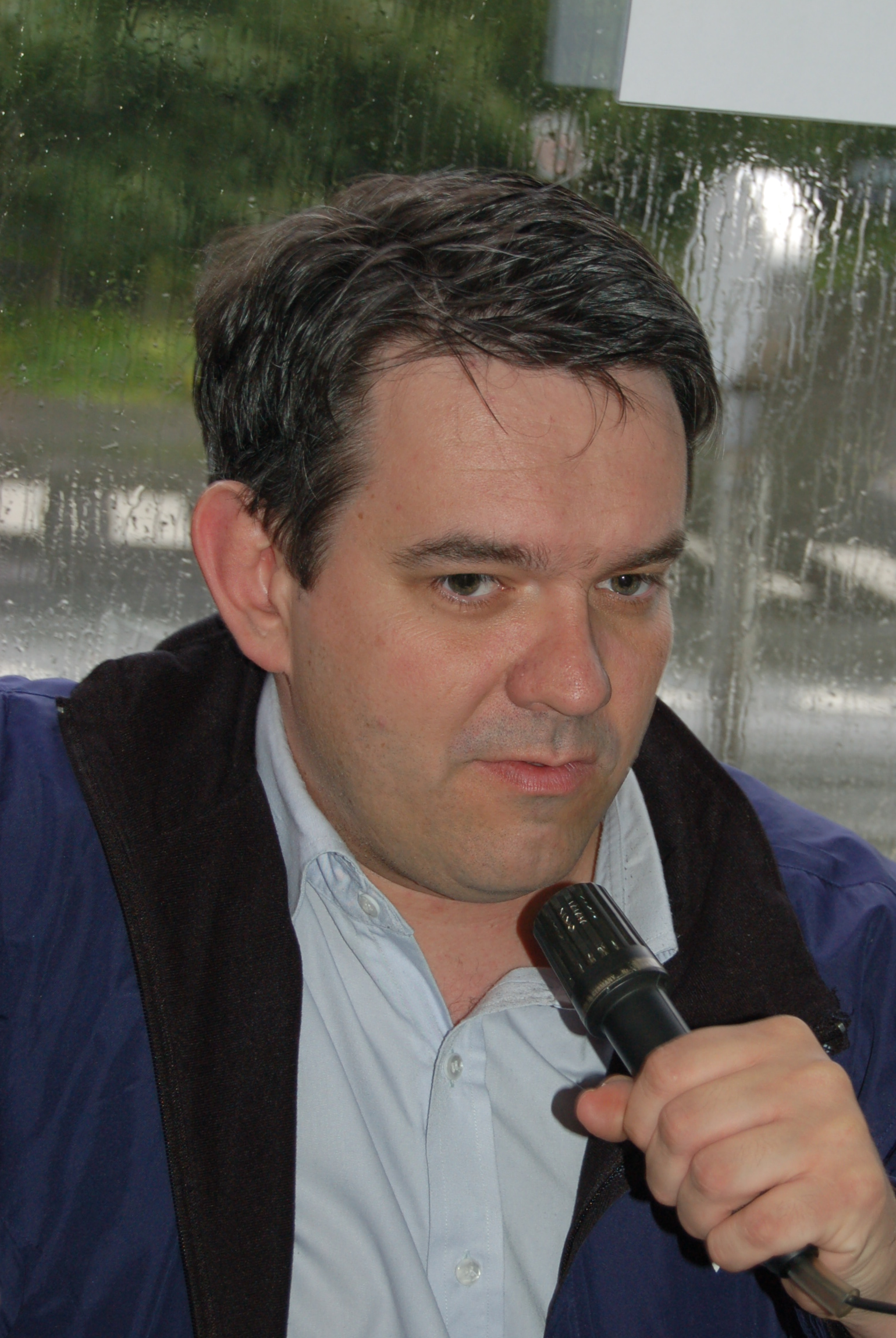

Deputy County Mayor of Hordaland
- In office 2003–2007

Personal details
- Born: 28 August 1969 (age 57) Askøy Municipality, Norway
- Party: Conservative
- Education: Norwegian School of Economics and Business Administration
- Profession: Businessperson
- Website: party page on Nilsen

Tom-Christer Nilsen (born 28 August 1969) is a Norwegian politician for the Conservative Party and county mayor of Hordaland. He has been a member of Hordaland county council since 1995 and group chairman for the Conservatives since 2001.

Before becoming a full-time politician he worked for Avinor at Bergen Airport, Flesland. He was educated at the Norwegian School of Economics and Business Administration and resides in Askøy Municipality.

He is a son of Oddvard Nilsen.
