= Henrik Friis Robberstad =

Norwegian politician

Henrik Friis Robberstad (September 6, 1901 – July 27, 1978) was a Norwegian politician for the Conservative Party. He was born in Herlø Municipality.

He was elected to the Norwegian Parliament from Hordaland in 1945, but was not re-elected in 1949. Instead he served the terms 1950–1953 and 1954–1957 as a deputy representative.

Robberstad was a member of the municipal council of Bremnes Municipality from both 1928 to 1937 and from 1947 to 1955, serving as deputy mayor during the term 1931–1934.
