= Knut Markhus =

Norwegian politician

- Born: 7 November 1878; Skånevik Municipality, Norway
- Died: 7 August 1963 (aged 84)
- Other names: Knut Olson Markhus
- Education: schoolteacher
- Occupations: educator and politician

Knut Markhus (7 November 1878 – 7 August 1963) was a Norwegian educator and politician.

He was born in Skånevik Municipality. He edited the newspaper Haugesunds Avis from 1911 to 1913. In 1913 he founded the folk high school Sunnhordland folkehøgskule, where he eventually served as headmaster. He was elected to the Storting from Hordaland for the periods 1922–1930 and 1937–1945, representing the Liberal Party. He chaired Noregs Mållag from 1936 to 1946.

Cultural offices
| Preceded by Anders Todal | Chairman of Noregs Mållag; 1936–1946 | Succeeded by Hans Eidnes |
