= Frøya Sjursæther =

Norwegian politician (born 2006)

- Sjursæther in 2023

Member of the Storting
- Incumbent
- Assumed office 1 October 2025
- Constituency: Hordaland

Personal details
- Born: 8 June 2006 (age 20) Bergen, Norway
- Party: Green Party

Frøya Skjold Sjursæther (born 8 June 2006) is a Norwegian politician who was elected member of the Storting in 2025. She is the youngest-ever member of parliament.
