= Margit Tøsdal =

Norwegian politician

Margit Tøsdal (14 April 1918 – 12 January 1993) was a Norwegian politician for the Labour Party. She was born in Os Municipality.

She was a member of the municipal council of Os Municipality from 1951 to 1955.

She was elected to the Norwegian Parliament from Hordaland in 1961, and was re-elected on two occasions. She had previously served as a deputy representative in the period 1958–1961. Tøsdal was President of the Lagting 1977–1981.

She founded the friendship association Friends of Israel in the Norwegian Labour Movement (Norwegian: Venner av Israel i Norsk Arbeiderbevegelse).
