= Linda Monsen Merkesdal =

Norwegian politician

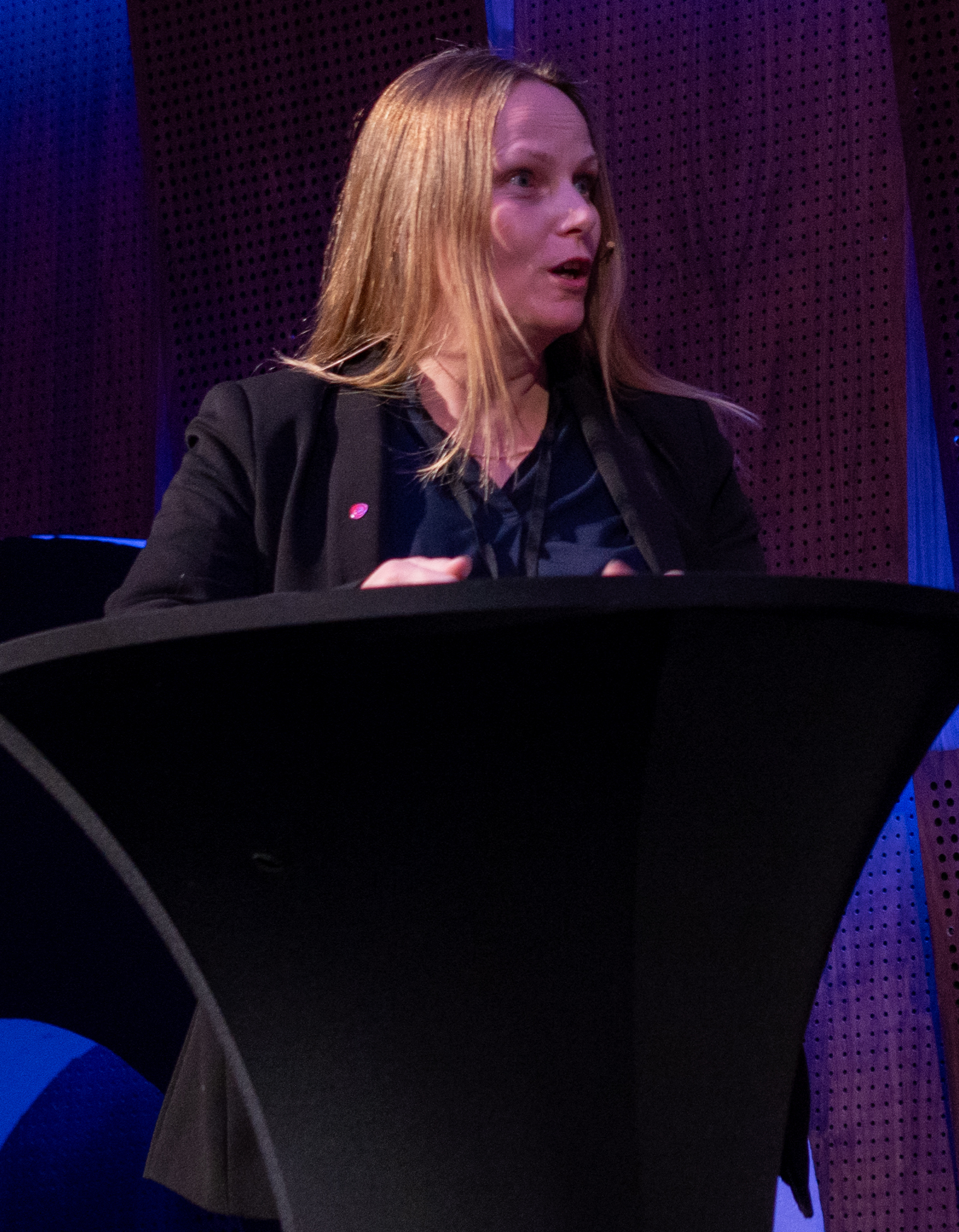
- Merkesdal in 2023
- Born: 12 April 1973 (age 53)
- Occupation: Politician
- Political party: Labour Party

Linda Monsen Merkesdal (born 12 April 1973) is a Norwegian politician for the Labour Party.

== Political career ==
Born on 12 April 1973, Merkesdal was elected member of the municipal council of Voss from 2015. She was elected representative to the Storting from the constituency of Hordaland for the period 2021–2025, for the Labour Party. In the Storting, she was a member of the Standing Committee on Energy and the Environment from 2021 to 2025. She was reelected representative to the Storting from Hordaland for the period 2025–2029.

She was deputy representative to the Storting 2017–2021.
