= Harald Bjarne Slettebø =

Norwegian politician

Harald Bjarne Slettebø (1 April 1922 – 27 May 2018) was a Norwegian politician of the Progress Party.

Slettebø received a degree from the University of Oslo in 1946. He worked as a teacher in Stavanger and Haugesund, and in 1959 he became rector of Stord gymnas, a position he held until 1989.

In 1973, Slettebø was elected to the Stortinget for the Progress Party in Hordaland. He sat for one term, and was a member of the Justice committee. In 1976–77, he was also parliamentary leader, after the party changed its name to Fremskrittspartiet.

He later sat on the municipal council of Stord Municipality from 1979 to 1983 and on Hordaland county council from 1983 to 1987.
