= Sigrid Utkilen =

Norwegian politician

Sigrid Utkilen (15 January 1916 – 4 December 2006) was a Norwegian politician for the Conservative Party.

She was elected to the Norwegian Parliament from Hordaland in 1973, and was re-elected on one occasion. She had previously served as a deputy representative during the term 1969–1973. From January 1973 she served as a regular representative, filling in for Kjeld Langeland who had died.

On the local level she was a member of the municipal council of Fjell Municipality from 1967 to 1971. Outside politics she worked as a nurse.
