= Terje Knudsen =

Norwegian politician

Terje Knudsen (born 6 March 1942) is a former Norwegian politician and Member of Parliament for the Progress Party.

Knudsen was born in Bergen. He was a local politician in Bergen for the Conservative Party during the 1970s and 1980s, and held offices in the Bergen city council. During the 1990s he however changed to the Progress Party, and held local offices within the party. He was elected as a Member of Parliament in 1997, but left the party in March 2001 following internal conflicts, calling the process by the party leadership "unworthy".
