= Torill Eidsheim =

Norwegian politician

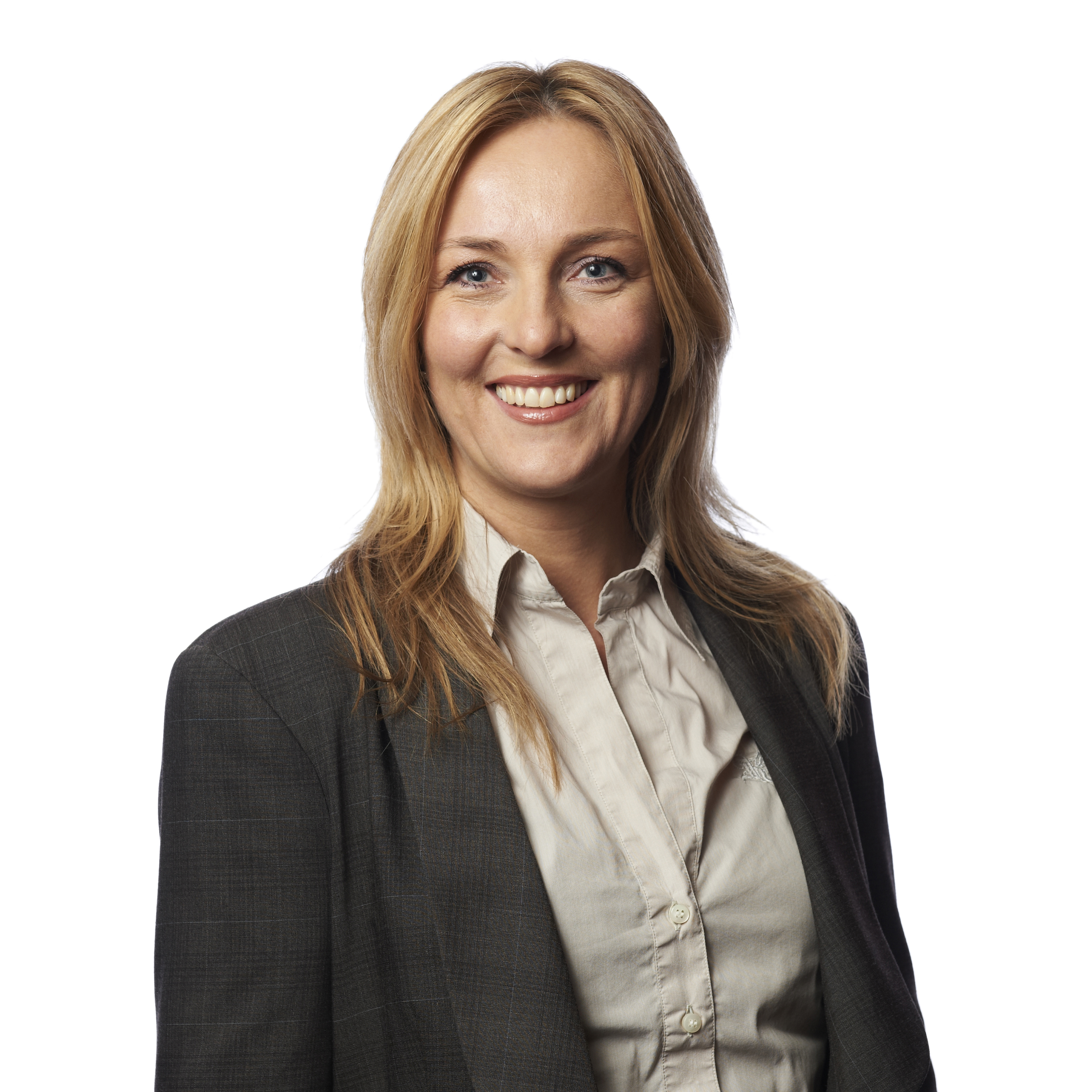
- Born: 8 April 1970 (age 56); Lindås, Norway
- Occupation: Politician

Torill Eidsheim (born 8 April 1970) is a Norwegian politician for the Conservative Party.

== Personal life ==
Eidsheim was born in Lindås on 8 April 1970. She is a daughter of engineer Ivar Eidsheim and secretary Kari Hagesæter.

== Career ==
A deputy to the Storting from 2009 to 2013, Eidsheim was elected to the Parliament of Norway from Hordaland in 2013 where she was member of the Standing Committee on Transport and Communications from 2013 to 2017.

She was reelected to the Storting in 2017, and was a member of the Standing Committee on Health and Care Services from 2017 to 2020, and the Standing Committee on Local Government and Public Administration from 2020 to 2021.
