= Leif Lund =

Norwegian politician (1942–2004)

Leif Lund (24 September 1942 – 30 May 2004) was a Norwegian politician for the Labour Party.

He was elected to the Norwegian Parliament from Hordaland in 1997, and was re-elected on one occasions. However, during his second term he died and was replaced by Rita Tveiten. He had served as a deputy representative during the term 1993–1997, but actually met on a regular basis meanwhile Grete Knudsen was appointed to the consecutive cabinets Brundtland 3 and Jagland.

Lund was born in Bergen and a member of Bergen city council from 1991 to 1995.
