= Torbjørn Hansen =

Norwegian politician (born 1972)

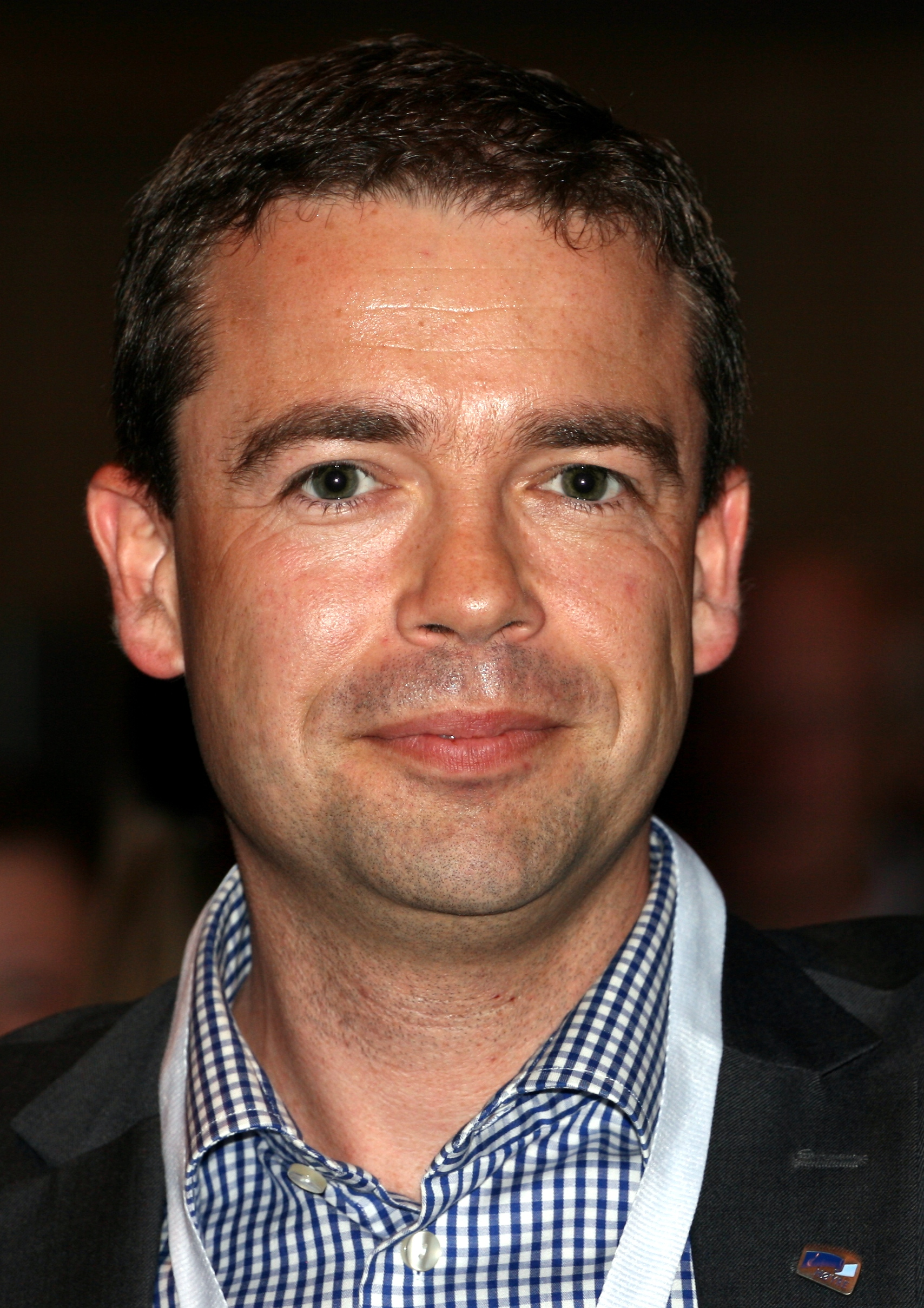
Torbjørn Hansen (2009)

Torbjørn Hansen (born 13 August 1972, in Bergen) is a Norwegian politician representing the Conservative Party (Høyre). He is currently a representative of Hordaland in the Storting and was first elected in 2001.

== Storting committees ==
- 2001–2005 member of the Finance committee.
- 2005–2009 member of the Business committee.
