= Oddvard Nilsen =

Norwegian politician

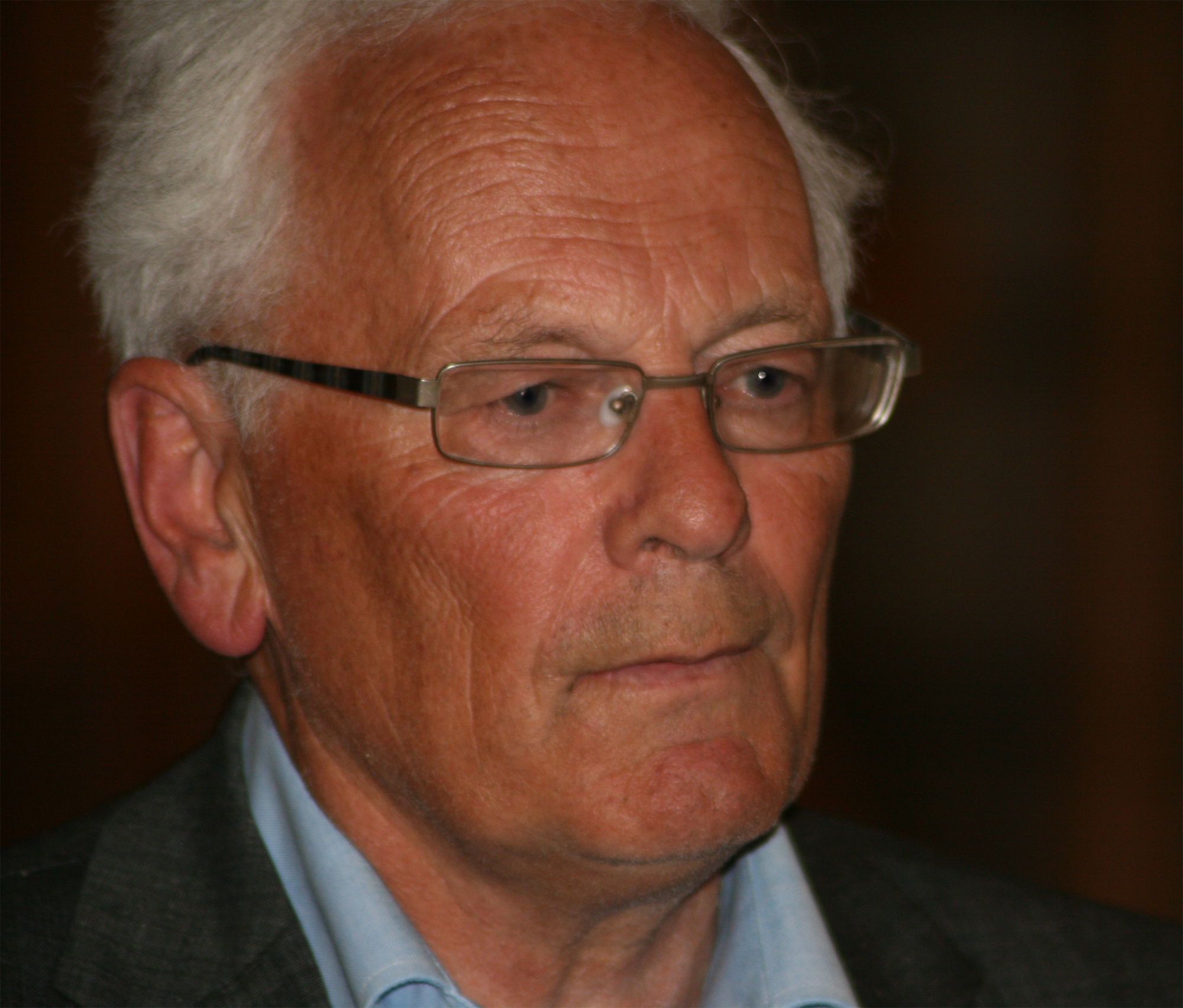

Conservative Parliamentary Leader
- In office 17 October 2001 – 30 September 2005
- Leader: Jan Petersen; Erna Solberg
- Preceded by: Jan Petersen
- Succeeded by: Erna Solberg

Member of the Norwegian Parliament
- In office 1 October 1993 – 30 September 2005
- Constituency: Hordaland

Mayor of Askøy Municipality
- In office 1 January 1990 – 30 September 1993
- Preceded by: Øyvind Fluge
- Succeeded by: Øyvind Fluge

Personal details
- Born: 24 June 1940 (age 85) Bergen, Hordaland, Norway
- Party: Conservative Party
- Children: 2

Oddvard Nilsen (born 24 June 1940, in Bergen) is a Norwegian politician for the Conservative Party.

He was elected to the Norwegian Parliament from Hordaland in 1993 and was re-elected on two occasions.

Nilsen was a member of the executive committee of the municipal council of Askøy Municipality from 1983 to 1989, and then served as mayor from 1989 to 1993.

Political offices
Preceded by Magnus Stangeland	Chair of the Standing Committee on Transport; 1997–2001	Succeeded by Petter Løvik
