= Marthe Hammer =

Norwegian politician

Member of the Storting
- Incumbent
- Assumed office 2025
- Constituency: Hordaland

Personal details
- Born: 1979 (age 46–47)
- Party: Socialist Left Party

Marthe Hammer (born 1979) is a Norwegian politician for the Socialist Left Party. She has been a member of the Storting since 2025.

== See also ==
- List of members of the Storting, 2025–2029
