= Øyvind Halleraker =

Norwegian politician (born 1951)

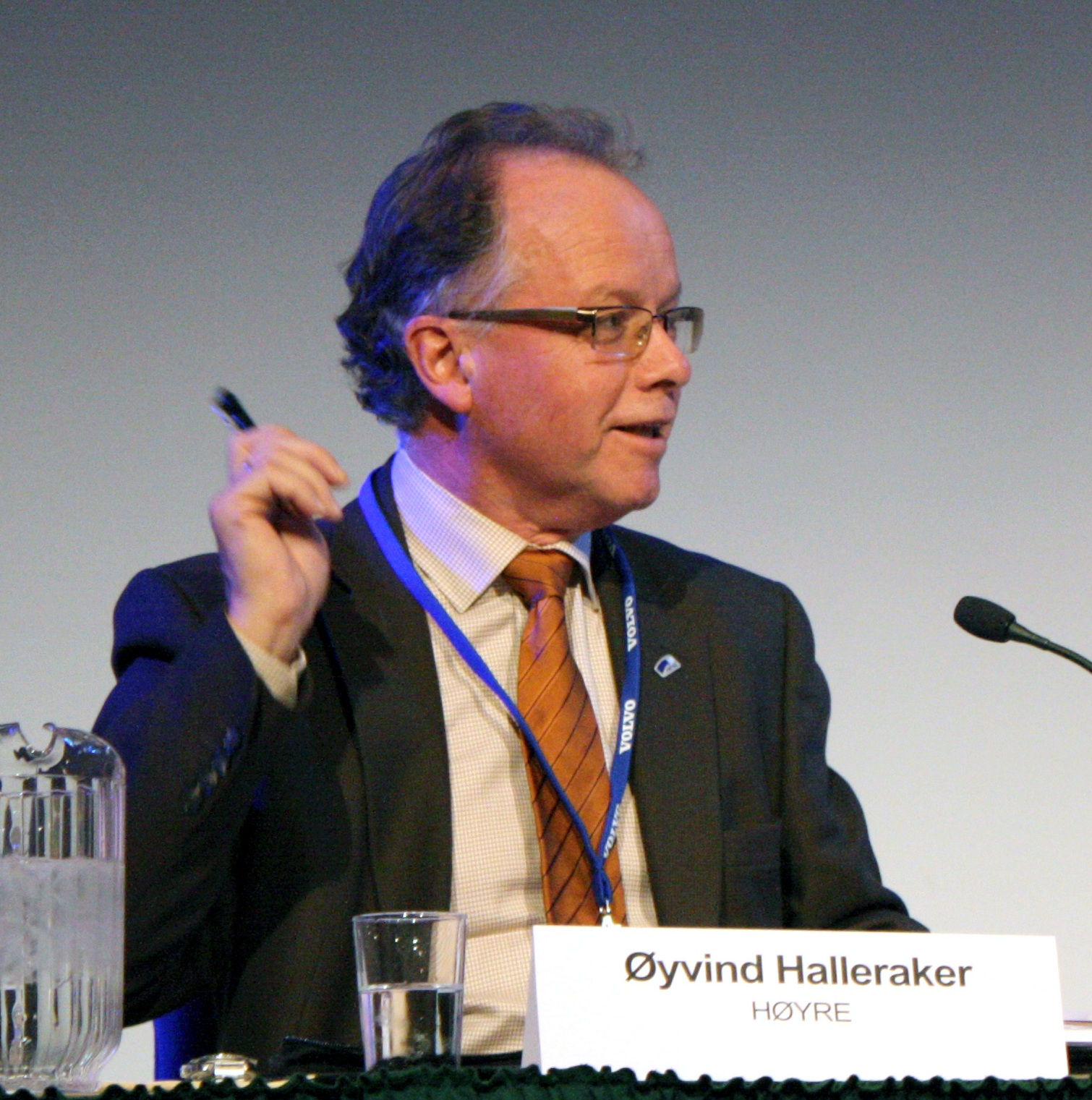
Øyvind Halleraker.

Øyvind Halleraker (born 27 October 1951, in Oslo) is a Norwegian politician representing the Conservative Party. He is currently a representative of Hordaland in the Storting and was first elected in 2001.

== Parliamentary Committee duties ==
- 2005–2009 member of the Transportation and Communication committee.
- 2001–2005 member of the Energy and Environment committee.
