= Karin S. Woldseth =

Norwegian politician

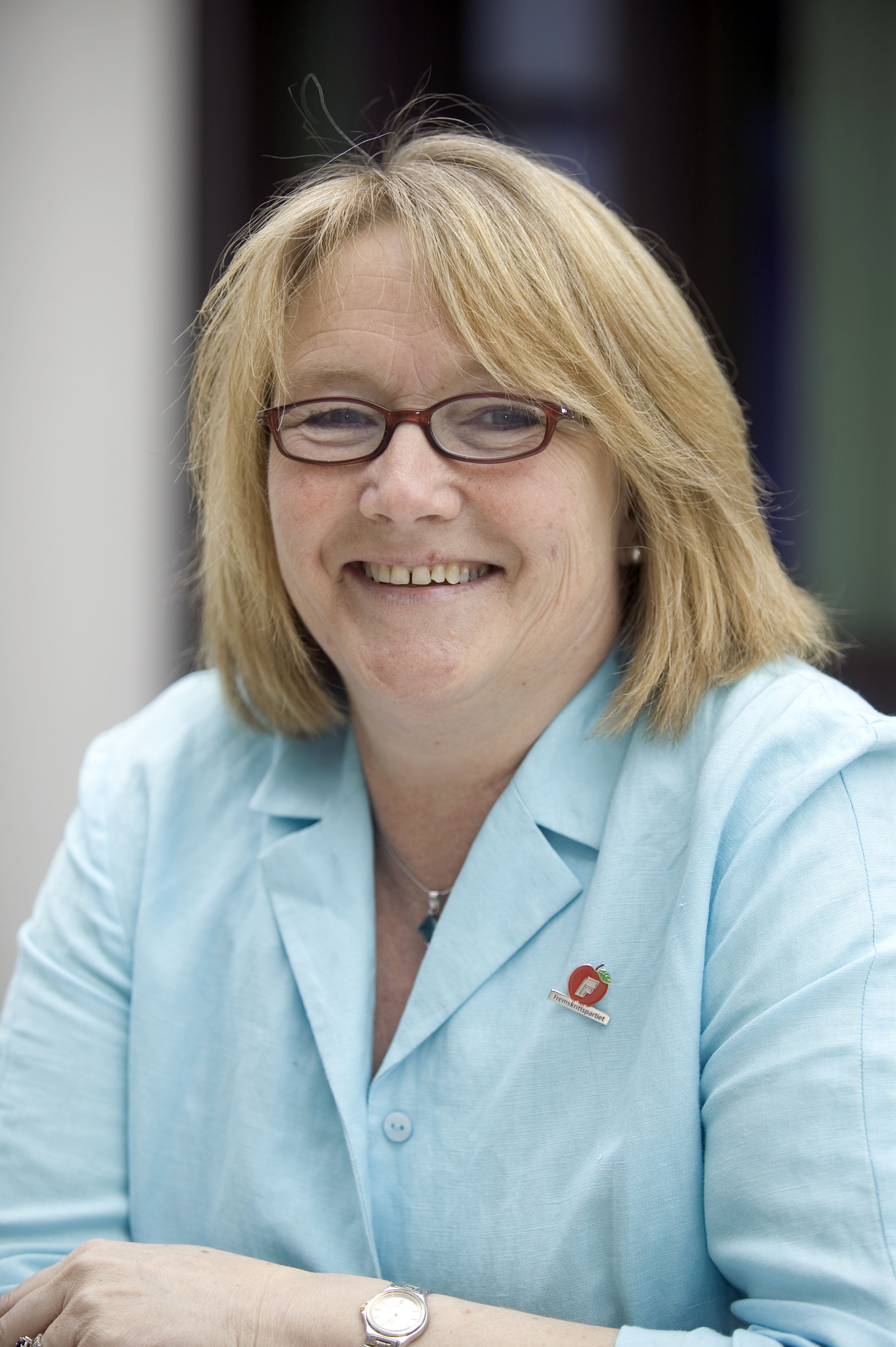
Member of the Norwegian parliament, Karin S. Woldseth

Karin Ståhl Woldseth (born 9 August 1954 in Oslo) is a Norwegian politician representing the Progress Party. She was a representative of Hordaland in the Storting until 2013 and was first elected in 2001.

== Controversy ==
Woldseth was a member of the Norwegian delegation to the Parliamentary Assembly of the Council of Europe (PACE) from 2009 to 2013, and also served as chairperson of the Norwegian delegation. She held the position of honorary member of PACE since January 2014. In July 2018 Woldseth was stripped of her honorary membership of PACE, and expelled for life from the Council of Europe due to unethical lobbying, along with 13 other former members.

== Storting committees ==
- 2005–2009 member of the Family and Culture committee.
- 2001–2005 member of the Family, Culture and Administration committee.
- 2001–2005 second deputy leader of the Electoral committee.
- Also famous for her reluctance against flying cattle class in the line of duty. The travel referred to as "inhumane".
