= Georg Johan Jacobsen =

Norwegian politician (1929–2011)

Georg Johan Jacobsen (29 July 1929 – 24 April 2011) was a Norwegian politician for the Labour Party.

He was born in Bergen, finished commerce school in 1948, spent two years at sea before working various jobs. Among others he worked with administration in Bergens Arbeiderblad from 1962 to 1968.

He was a member of Bergen city council from 1959 to 1963, and of its executive committee from 1967 to 1971. He was elected to the Parliament of Norway from Hordaland in 1973, and was re-elected on one occasion in 1977. He was the deputy chair of his party locally from 1961 to 1974.

He was a board member of Bergen Sporvei from 1965, and of Bro- og Tunnelselskapet from 1971.
