= Rune J. Skjælaaen =

Norwegian politician (born 1954)

Rune J. Skjælaaen (born 23 January 1954 in Bergen) is a Norwegian politician for the Centre Party (SP). He was elected to the Norwegian Parliament from Hordaland in 2001.

== Parliamentary Committee duties ==
- 2005 - 2009 member of the Standing Committee on Health and Care Services.
- 2005 - 2009 member of the Electoral Committee.
- 2001 - 2005 member of the Standing Committee on Education, Research and Church Affairs.
- 2001 - 2005 deputy member of the Electoral Committee.
