= Are Næss =

Norwegian physician and politician (1942–2024)

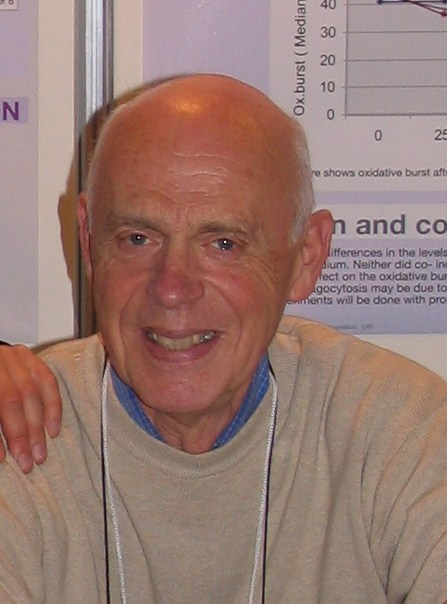
Næss in 2008

Are Næss (14 November 1942 – 12 August 2024) was a Norwegian physician and politician for the Christian Democratic Party.

== Life and career ==
Næss was elected to the Norwegian Parliament from Hordaland in 1993, and was re-elected on one occasion.

Næss studied English and later medicine, becoming a specialist in infectious diseases 1986. He worked as a doctor, and from 1993 he was a professor at Haukeland University Hospital. Næss died on 12 August 2024, at the age of 81.

== Sources ==
- "Are Næss" (in Norwegian). Storting.
