= Arne Sortevik =

Norwegian politician

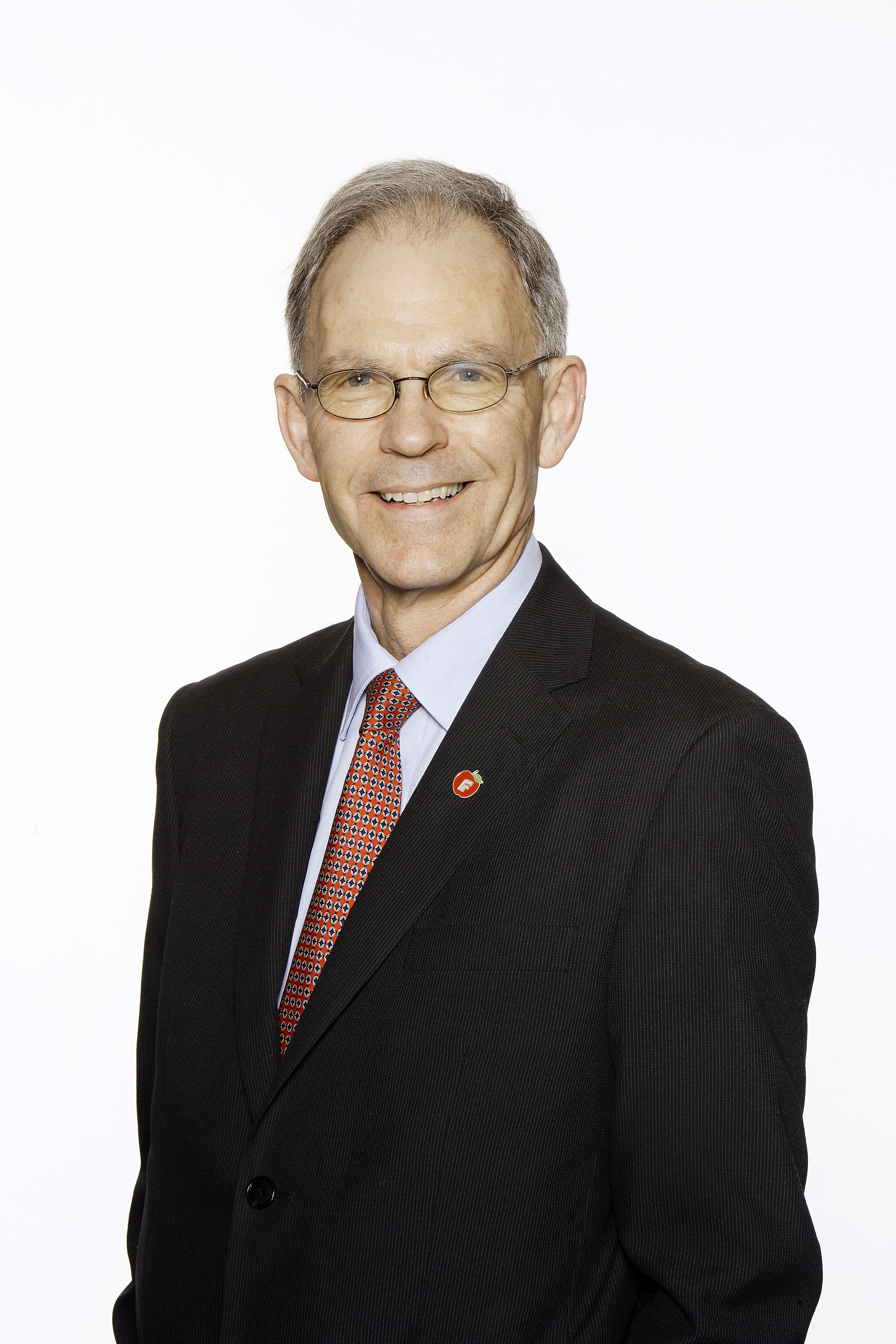
Arne Sortevik, image by Bård Gudim, FrPMedia

Arne Sortevik (born 12 March 1947 in Bergen) is a Norwegian politician representing the Progress Party. He is currently a representative of Hordaland in the Storting and was first elected in 2001. He will not seek reelection to the parliament in 2013.

== Parliamentary Committee duties ==
- 2005–2013 member of the Transport and Communication committee.
- 2001–2009 reserve member of the Electoral committee.
- 2001–2005 member of the Church, Education and Research committee.
