= Gjermund Hagesæter =

Norwegian politician (born 1960)

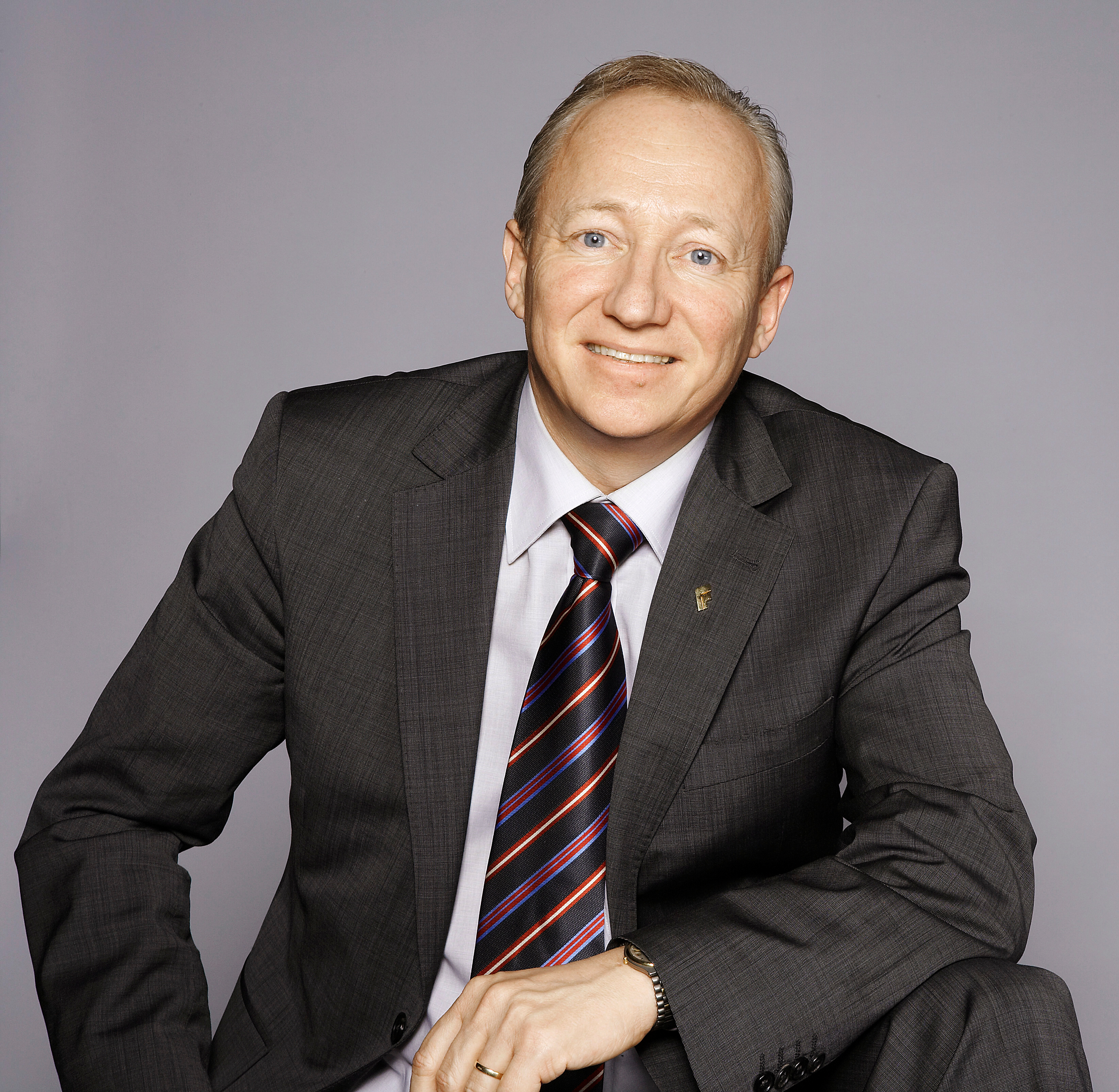
Gjermund Hagesæter

Gjermund Hagesæter (born 12 December 1960 in Lindås Municipality) is a Norwegian politician representing the Progress Party. He is currently a representative of Hordaland in the Storting and was first elected in 2001.

In 2011 he applied for the position as County Governor of Sogn og Fjordane, but was not appointed.
