= Møre og Romsdal (Storting constituency) =

Constituency of the Storting, the national legislature of Norway

- Constituency for the Storting
- Location of Møre og Romsdal within Norway
- County: Møre og Romsdal
- Population: 272,658 (2025)
- Electorate: 196,531 (2025)
- Area: 14,356 km^{2} (2025)

Current constituency
- Created: 1921
- Seats: List: 7 (2021–present); 8 (2005–2021); 10 (1953–2005); 7 (1921–1953)
- Members of the Storting: List: Åse Kristin Ask Bakke (Ap); Per Vidar Kjølmoen (Ap); Geir Inge Lien (Sp); Sylvi Listhaug (FrP); Monica Molvær (H); Frank Edvard Sve (FrP); Joakim Myklebost Tangen (FrP); Harry Valderhaug (H)
- Created from: List: Inner Nordmør; Inner Sunnmør; Møre and Rauma; Outer Nordmør; Outer Sunnmøre; Romsdal

Møre og Romsdal is one of the 19 multi-member constituencies of the Storting, the national legislature of Norway. The constituency was established as Møre in 1921 following the introduction of proportional representation for elections to the Storting. It was renamed Møre og Romsdal from 1935. It is conterminous with the county of Møre og Romsdal. The constituency currently elects seven of the 169 members of the Storting using the open party-list proportional representation electoral system. At the 2025 parliamentary election it had 196,531 registered electors.

== Electoral system ==
Møre og Romsdal currently elects seven of the 169 members of the Storting using the open (Note: Although technically elections to the Storting have open lists, they are in effect closed lists as a majority of those voting for a party must make changes to the lists for the changes to take effect, which has never happened since the introduction of proportional representation in 1921, and as result candidates are elected in the order submitted by the party.) party-list proportional representation electoral system. Constituency seats are allocated by the County Electoral Committee using the Modified Sainte-Laguë method. Compensatory seats (seats at large or levelling seats) are calculated based on the national vote and are allocated by the National Electoral Committee using the Modified Sainte-Laguë method at the constituency level (one for each constituency). Only parties that reach the 4% national threshold compete for compensatory seats.

== Election results ==
=== Summary ===
Election	Communists K			Reds R / RV / FMS			Socialist Left SV / SF			Labour Ap			Greens MDG			Centre Sp / Bp / L			Liberals V			Christian Democrats KrF			Conservatives H			Progress FrP / ALP		
Election	Votes	%	Seats	Votes	%	Seats	Votes	%	Seats	Votes	%	Seats	Votes	%	Seats	Votes	%	Seats	Votes	%	Seats	Votes	%	Seats	Votes	%	Seats	Votes	%	Seats
2025				5,418	3.46%	0	5,965	3.80%	0	36,992	23.59%	2	4,831	3.08%	0	11,488	7.33%	1	4,659	2.97%	0	10,599	6.76%	0	19,821	12.64%	1	50,722	32.35%	3
2021				4,933	3.32%	0	9,341	6.29%	0	29,928	20.17%	2	3,697	2.49%	0	25,938	17.48%	2	4,364	2.94%	0	7,905	5.33%	0	24,123	16.25%	1	32,746	22.06%	2
2017				1,809	1.23%	0	5,745	3.91%	0	31,353	21.33%	2	3,167	2.15%	0	19,046	12.96%	1	5,088	3.46%	0	9,017	6.14%	0	34,708	23.62%	3	32,750	22.28%	2
2013				642	0.45%	0	3,532	2.46%	0	36,048	25.16%	2	1,963	1.37%	0	11,749	8.20%	1	7,965	5.56%	0	12,786	8.92%	1	37,594	26.24%	2	28,746	20.06%	2
2009				653	0.47%	0	5,279	3.81%	0	42,542	30.68%	3	196	0.14%	0	11,879	8.57%	1	5,298	3.82%	0	11,713	8.45%	1	22,356	16.12%	1	37,967	27.38%	2
2005				573	0.41%	0	8,321	5.93%	0	36,649	26.14%	2	111	0.08%	0	11,795	8.41%	1	10,623	7.58%	1	15,465	11.03%	1	17,962	12.81%	1	36,813	26.26%	2
2001				573	0.42%	0	11,870	8.76%	1	26,473	19.53%	2				8,892	6.56%	1	8,749	6.46%	0	26,850	19.81%	2	23,397	17.26%	2	23,378	17.25%	2
1997	44	0.03%	0	970	0.68%	0	5,836	4.11%	0	39,390	27.73%	3	159	0.11%	0	14,156	9.96%	1	10,075	7.09%	1	32,695	23.01%	2	15,836	11.15%	1	20,854	14.68%	2
1993				398	0.30%	0	7,963	5.91%	0	41,116	30.53%	4				32,020	23.77%	3	6,262	4.65%	0	18,421	13.68%	2	17,586	13.06%	1	7,945	5.90%	0
1989				519	0.35%	0	11,313	7.73%	1	42,746	29.20%	3	261	0.18%	0	12,604	8.61%	1	7,614	5.20%	0	24,024	16.41%	2	27,455	18.75%	2	19,019	12.99%	1
1985	82	0.06%	0	422	0.29%	0	5,490	3.82%	0	49,386	34.36%	4				13,134	9.14%	1	7,732	5.38%	0	23,513	16.36%	2	36,570	25.45%	3	5,373	3.74%	0
1981	132	0.09%	0	629	0.45%	0	4,636	3.34%	0	41,111	29.58%	3				13,581	9.77%	1	9,922	7.14%	1	26,233	18.87%	2	37,585	27.04%	3	4,649	3.34%	0
1977	109	0.09%	0	552	0.43%	0	3,369	2.64%	0	40,702	31.86%	3				15,895	12.44%	1	9,907	7.75%	1	29,418	23.03%	3	24,027	18.81%	2	1,642	1.29%	0
1973				276	0.23%	0	8,087	6.83%	1	30,719	25.95%	3				20,063	16.95%	2	13,471	11.38%	1	26,507	22.40%	2	10,463	8.84%	1	5,239	4.43%	0
1969	353	0.30%	0				2,189	1.88%	0	41,497	35.60%	3				21,127	18.13%	2	19,481	16.71%	2	21,027	18.04%	2	10,877	9.33%	1			
1965							4,673	4.25%	0	36,055	32.82%	3				21,042	19.16%	2	18,390	16.74%	2	18,531	16.87%	2	11,154	10.15%	1			
1961	733	0.75%	0				4,144	4.21%	0	34,124	34.69%	4				13,342	13.56%	1	15,849	16.11%	2	20,845	21.19%	2	9,340	9.49%	1			
1957	860	0.88%	0							37,166	38.08%	4				12,438	12.74%	1	17,167	17.59%	2	21,601	22.13%	2	8,377	8.58%	1			
1953	1,402	1.44%	0							35,978	36.97%	4				12,496	12.84%	1	16,403	16.86%	2	22,396	23.01%	2	8,637	8.88%	1			
1949	465	0.62%	0							24,073	32.29%	2							17,314	23.22%	2	26,179	35.11%	3	5,572	7.47%	0			
1945	1,079	1.71%	0							18,495	29.30%	2				10,337	16.38%	1	13,245	20.98%	2	18,634	29.52%	2	1,329	2.11%	0			
1936										15,803	25.48%	2				15,830	25.52%	2	22,000	35.47%	3									
1933										11,393	22.23%	1				15,896	31.02%	3	17,131	33.43%	3									
1930										7,764	14.39%	1				15,731	29.17%	2	27,271	50.56%	4									
1927										8,240	18.89%	1				11,511	26.39%	2	21,294	48.82%	4				2,569	5.89%	0			
1924	195	0.43%	0							1,749	3.89%	0				10,952	24.36%	2	21,846	48.60%	4				5,487	12.21%	1			
1921										2,669	6.16%	0				10,355	23.88%	2	22,485	51.86%	5				4,366	10.07%	0			

(Excludes compensatory seats. Figures in italics represent joint lists.)

=== Detailed ===
==== 2020s ====
===== 2025 =====
Results of the 2025 parliamentary election held on 8 September 2025:

Party		Votes	%	Seats		
Party		Votes	%	Con.	Com.	Tot.
Progress Party	FrP	50,722	32.35%	3	0	3
Labour Party	Ap	36,992	23.59%	2	0	2
Conservative Party	H	19,821	12.64%	1	0	1
Centre Party	Sp	11,488	7.33%	1	0	1
Christian Democratic Party	KrF	10,599	6.76%	0	1	1
Socialist Left Party	SV	5,965	3.80%	0	0	0
Red Party	R	5,418	3.46%	0	0	0
Green Party	MDG	4,831	3.08%	0	0	0
Liberal Party	V	4,659	2.97%	0	0	0
Industry and Business Party	INP	1,123	0.72%	0	0	0
Norway Democrats	ND	1,105	0.70%	0	0	0
Generation Party	GP	1,066	0.68%	0	0	0
Pensioners' Party	PP	1,000	0.64%	0	0	0
Conservative	K	958	0.61%	0	0	0
Peace and Justice	FOR	373	0.24%	0	0	0
DNI Party	DNI	320	0.20%	0	0	0
Welfare and Innovation Party	VIP	229	0.15%	0	0	0
Center Party	PS	140	0.09%	0	0	0
Valid votes		156,809	100.00%	7	1	8
Blank votes		1,175	0.74%			
Rejected votes – other		274	0.17%			
Total polled		158,258	80.53%			
Registered electors		196,531				

The following candidates were elected:

- Constituency seats - Åse Kristin Ask Bakke (Ap); Per Vidar Kjølmoen (Ap); Geir Inge Lien (Sp); Sylvi Listhaug (FrP); Monica Molvær (H); Frank Edvard Sve (FrP); and Joakim Myklebost Tangen (FrP).
- Compensatory seat - Harry Valderhaug (KrF).

===== 2021 =====
Results of the 2021 parliamentary election held on 13 September 2021:

Party		Votes	%	Seats		
Party		Votes	%	Con.	Com.	Tot.
Progress Party	FrP	32,746	22.06%	2	0	2
Labour Party	Ap	29,928	20.17%	2	0	2
Centre Party	Sp	25,938	17.48%	2	0	2
Conservative Party	H	24,123	16.25%	1	0	1
Socialist Left Party	SV	9,341	6.29%	0	1	1
Christian Democratic Party	KrF	7,905	5.33%	0	0	0
Red Party	R	4,933	3.32%	0	0	0
Liberal Party	V	4,364	2.94%	0	0	0
Green Party	MDG	3,697	2.49%	0	0	0
Democrats in Norway		1,752	1.18%	0	0	0
Industry and Business Party	INP	1,096	0.74%	0	0	0
The Christians	PDK	812	0.55%	0	0	0
Pensioners' Party	PP	790	0.53%	0	0	0
Center Party		325	0.22%	0	0	0
Health Party		280	0.19%	0	0	0
Capitalist Party		175	0.12%	0	0	0
Alliance - Alternative for Norway		126	0.08%	0	0	0
People's Action No to More Road Tolls	FNB	79	0.05%	0	0	0
Valid votes		148,410	100.00%	7	1	8
Blank votes		936	0.63%			
Rejected votes – other		232	0.16%			
Total polled		149,578	77.75%			
Registered electors		192,394				

The following candidates were elected:

- Constituency seats - Åse Kristin Ask Bakke (Ap); Per Vidar Kjølmoen (Ap); Jenny Klinge (Sp); Geir Inge Lien (Sp); Sylvi Listhaug (FrP); Helge Orten (H); and Frank Edvard Sve (FrP).
- Compensatory seat - Birgit Oline Kjerstad (SV).

==== 2010s ====
===== 2017 =====
Results of the 2017 parliamentary election held on 11 September 2017:

Party		Votes	%	Seats		
Party		Votes	%	Con.	Com.	Tot.
Conservative Party	H	34,708	23.62%	3	0	3
Progress Party	FrP	32,750	22.28%	2	0	2
Labour Party	Ap	31,353	21.33%	2	0	2
Centre Party	Sp	19,046	12.96%	1	0	1
Christian Democratic Party	KrF	9,017	6.14%	0	1	1
Socialist Left Party	SV	5,745	3.91%	0	0	0
Liberal Party	V	5,088	3.46%	0	0	0
Green Party	MDG	3,167	2.15%	0	0	0
Nordmøre List		2,135	1.45%	0	0	0
Red Party	R	1,809	1.23%	0	0	0
Pensioners' Party	PP	798	0.54%	0	0	0
The Christians	PDK	741	0.50%	0	0	0
The Alliance		181	0.12%	0	0	0
Capitalist Party		175	0.12%	0	0	0
Democrats in Norway		129	0.09%	0	0	0
Coastal Party	KP	121	0.08%	0	0	0
Valid votes		146,963	100.00%	8	1	9
Blank votes		827	0.56%			
Rejected votes – other		171	0.12%			
Total polled		147,961	77.51%			
Registered electors		190,887				

The following candidates were elected:

- Constituency seats - Fredric Holen Bjørdal (Ap); Jon Georg Dale (FrP); Jenny Klinge (Sp); Sylvi Listhaug (FrP); Else-May Norderhus (Ap); Helge Orten (H); Vetle Wang Soleim (H); and Marianne Synnes (H).
- Compensatory seat - Steinar Reiten (KrF).

===== 2013 =====
Results of the 2013 parliamentary election held on 8 and 9 September 2013:

Party		Votes	%	Seats		
Party		Votes	%	Con.	Com.	Tot.
Conservative Party	H	37,594	26.24%	2	0	2
Labour Party	Ap	36,048	25.16%	2	0	2
Progress Party	FrP	28,746	20.06%	2	0	2
Christian Democratic Party	KrF	12,786	8.92%	1	0	1
Centre Party	Sp	11,749	8.20%	1	0	1
Liberal Party	V	7,965	5.56%	0	1	1
Socialist Left Party	SV	3,532	2.46%	0	0	0
Green Party	MDG	1,963	1.37%	0	0	0
The Christians	PDK	1,534	1.07%	0	0	0
Red Party	R	642	0.45%	0	0	0
Pirate Party of Norway		479	0.33%	0	0	0
Coastal Party	KP	159	0.11%	0	0	0
Democrats in Norway		94	0.07%	0	0	0
Valid votes		143,291	100.00%	8	1	9
Blank votes		591	0.41%			
Rejected votes – other		152	0.11%			
Total polled		144,034	76.74%			
Registered electors		187,682				

The following candidates were elected:

- Constituency seats - Fredric Holen Bjørdal (Ap); Rigmor Andersen Eide (KrF); Oskar Jarle Grimstad (FrP); Jenny Klinge (Sp); Harald T. Nesvik (FrP); Else-May Norderhus (Ap); Elisabeth Røbekk Nørve (H); and Helge Orten (H).
- Compensatory seat - Pål Farstad (V).

==== 2000s ====
===== 2009 =====
Results of the 2009 parliamentary election held on 13 and 14 September 2009:

Party		Votes	%	Seats		
Party		Votes	%	Con.	Com.	Tot.
Labour Party	Ap	42,542	30.68%	3	0	3
Progress Party	FrP	37,967	27.38%	2	1	3
Conservative Party	H	22,356	16.12%	1	0	1
Centre Party	Sp	11,879	8.57%	1	0	1
Christian Democratic Party	KrF	11,713	8.45%	1	0	1
Liberal Party	V	5,298	3.82%	0	0	0
Socialist Left Party	SV	5,279	3.81%	0	0	0
Red Party	R	653	0.47%	0	0	0
Christian Unity Party	KSP	488	0.35%	0	0	0
Coastal Party	KP	223	0.16%	0	0	0
Green Party	MDG	196	0.14%	0	0	0
Democrats in Norway		74	0.05%	0	0	0
Valid votes		138,668	100.00%	8	1	9
Blank votes		568	0.41%			
Rejected votes – other		80	0.06%			
Total polled		139,316	75.32%			
Registered electors		184,975				

The following candidates were elected:

- Constituency seats - Rigmor Andersen Eide (KrF); Svein Gjelseth (Ap); Oskar Jarle Grimstad (FrP); Jenny Klinge (Sp); Harald T. Nesvik (FrP); Else-May Norderhus (Ap); Elisabeth Røbekk Nørve (H); and Tove-Lise Torve (Ap).
- Compensatory seat - Mette Hanekamhaug (FrP).

===== 2005 =====
Results of the 2005 parliamentary election held on 11 and 12 September 2005:

Party		Votes	%	Seats		
Party		Votes	%	Con.	Com.	Tot.
Progress Party	FrP	36,813	26.26%	2	0	2
Labour Party	Ap	36,649	26.14%	2	0	2
Conservative Party	H	17,962	12.81%	1	0	1
Christian Democratic Party	KrF	15,465	11.03%	1	0	1
Centre Party	Sp	11,795	8.41%	1	0	1
Liberal Party	V	10,623	7.58%	1	0	1
Socialist Left Party	SV	8,321	5.93%	0	1	1
Coastal Party	KP	1,303	0.93%	0	0	0
Red Electoral Alliance	RV	573	0.41%	0	0	0
Christian Unity Party	KSP	447	0.3%	0	0	0
Democrats		112	0.08%	0	0	0
Green Party	MDG	111	0.08%	0	0	0
Reform Party		34	0.0%	0	0	0
Valid votes		140,208	100.00%	8	1	9
Blank votes		406	0.29%			
Rejected votes – other		150	0.11%			
Total polled		140,764	76.80%			
Registered electors		183,294				

The following candidates were elected:

- Constituency seats - Karita Bekkemellem (Ap); May-Helen Molvær Grimstad (KrF); Leif Helge Kongshaug (V); Asmund Kristoffersen (Ap); Petter Løvik (H); Harald T. Nesvik (FrP); Eli Sollied Øveraas (Sp); and Lodve Solholm (FrP).
- Compensatory seat - Bjørn Jacobsen (SV).

===== 2001 =====
Results of the 2001 parliamentary election held on 9 and 10 September 2001:

Party		Votes	%	Seats		
Party		Votes	%	Con.	Com.	Tot.
Christian Democratic Party	KrF	26,850	19.81%	2	0	2
Labour Party	Ap	26,473	19.53%	2	0	2
Conservative Party	H	23,397	17.26%	2	0	2
Progress Party	FrP	23,378	17.25%	2	0	2
Socialist Left Party	SV	11,870	8.76%	1	0	1
Centre Party	Sp	8,892	6.56%	1	0	1
Liberal Party	V	8,749	6.46%	0	0	0
Coastal Party	KP	2,291	1.69%	0	0	0
Pensioners' Party	PP	1,353	1.00%	0	0	0
The Political Party	DPP	1,042	0.77%	0	0	0
Red Electoral Alliance	RV	573	0.42%	0	0	0
Christian Unity Party	KSP	385	0.28%	0	0	0
Non-Partisan Coastal and Rural District Party		102	0.08%	0	0	0
Fatherland Party	FLP	94	0.07%	0	0	0
Norwegian People's Party	NFP	89	0.07%	0	0	0
Valid votes		135,538	100.00%	10	0	10
Rejected votes		636	0.47%			
Total polled		136,174	74.51%			
Registered electors		182,758				

The following candidates were elected:

- Constituency seats - Karita Bekkemellem (Ap); Kjell Magne Bondevik (KrF); May-Helen Molvær Grimstad (KrF); Bjørn Jacobsen (SV); Asmund Kristoffersen (Ap); Petter Løvik (H); Harald T. Nesvik (FrP); Elisabeth Røbekk Nørve (H); Eli Sollied Øveraas (Sp); and Lodve Solholm (FrP).

==== 1990s ====
===== 1997 =====
Results of the 1997 parliamentary election held on 15 September 1997:

Party		Votes	%	Seats		
Party		Votes	%	Con.	Com.	Tot.
Labour Party	Ap	39,390	27.73%	3	0	3
Christian Democratic Party	KrF	32,695	23.01%	2	0	2
Progress Party	FrP	20,854	14.68%	2	0	2
Conservative Party	H	15,836	11.15%	1	0	1
Centre Party	Sp	14,156	9.96%	1	0	1
Liberal Party	V	10,075	7.09%	1	0	1
Socialist Left Party	SV	5,836	4.11%	0	0	0
Pensioners' Party	PP	1,095	0.77%	0	0	0
Red Electoral Alliance	RV	970	0.68%	0	0	0
Non-Partisan Deputies	TVF	674	0.47%	0	0	0
Fatherland Party	FLP	202	0.14%	0	0	0
Green Party	MDG	159	0.11%	0	0	0
Natural Law Party		74	0.05%	0	0	0
Communist Party of Norway	K	44	0.03%	0	0	0
Valid votes		142,060	100.00%	10	0	10
Rejected votes		274	0.19%			
Total polled		142,334	78.04%			
Registered electors		182,396				

The following candidates were elected:

- Constituency seats - Karita Bekkemellem (Ap); Kjell Magne Bondevik (KrF); May-Helen Molvær Grimstad (KrF); Laila Kaland (Ap); Leif Helge Kongshaug (V); Asmund Kristoffersen (Ap); Petter Løvik (H); Harald T. Nesvik (FrP); Gudmund Restad (Sp); and Lodve Solholm (FrP).

===== 1993 =====
Results of the 1993 parliamentary election held on 12 and 13 September 1993:

Party		Votes	%	Seats		
Party		Votes	%	Con.	Com.	Tot.
Labour Party	Ap	41,116	30.53%	4	0	4
Centre Party	Sp	32,020	23.77%	3	0	3
Christian Democratic Party	KrF	18,421	13.68%	2	0	2
Conservative Party	H	17,586	13.06%	1	0	1
Socialist Left Party	SV	7,963	5.91%	0	0	0
Progress Party	FrP	7,945	5.90%	0	0	0
Liberal Party	V	6,262	4.65%	0	0	0
Pensioners' Party	PP	1,174	0.87%	0	0	0
Fatherland Party	FLP	725	0.54%	0	0	0
New Future Coalition Party	SNF	504	0.37%	0	0	0
Red Electoral Alliance	RV	398	0.30%	0	0	0
Christian Conservative Party	KKP	308	0.23%	0	0	0
Freedom Party against the EU		118	0.09%	0	0	0
Natural Law Party		113	0.08%	0	0	0
Liberal People's Party	DLF	39	0.03%	0	0	0
Valid votes		134,692	100.00%	10	0	10
Rejected votes		206	0.15%			
Total polled		134,898	74.59%			
Registered electors		180,856				

The following candidates were elected:

- Constituency seats - Karita Bekkemellem (Ap); Kjell Magne Bondevik (KrF); May-Helen Molvær Grimstad (KrF); Jørgen Holte (Sp); Laila Kaland (Ap); Ottar Kaldhol (Ap); Asmund Kristoffersen (Ap); Eli Sollied Øveraas (Sp); Gudmund Restad (Sp); and Anders Talleraas (H).

==== 1980s ====
===== 1989 =====
Results of the 1989 parliamentary election held on 10 and 11 September 1989:

Party		Votes	%	Seats		
Party		Votes	%	Con.	Com.	Tot.
Labour Party	Ap	42,746	29.20%	3	0	3
Conservative Party	H	27,455	18.75%	2	0	2
Christian Democratic Party	KrF	24,024	16.41%	2	0	2
Progress Party	FrP	19,019	12.99%	1	0	1
Centre Party	Sp	12,604	8.61%	1	0	1
Socialist Left Party	SV	11,313	7.73%	1	0	1
Liberal Party	V	7,614	5.20%	0	0	0
County Lists for Environment and Solidarity	FMS	519	0.35%	0	0	0
Stop Immigration	SI	484	0.33%	0	0	0
Pensioners' Party	PP	338	0.23%	0	0	0
Green Party	MDG	261	0.18%	0	0	0
Liberals-Europe Party		30	0.02%	0	0	0
Valid votes		146,407	100.00%	10	0	10
Rejected votes		153	0.10%			
Total polled		146,560	81.99%			
Registered electors		178,764				

The following candidates were elected:

- Constituency seats - Karita Bekkemellem (Ap); Kjell Magne Bondevik (KrF); Laila Kaland (Ap); Rikard Olsvik (Ap); Gudmund Restad (Sp); Per Rolf Sævik (KrF); Lodve Solholm (FrP); Ingvard Sverdrup (H); Anders Talleraas (H); and Marie Lovise Widnes (SV).

===== 1985 =====
Results of the 1985 parliamentary election held on 8 and 9 September 1985:

Party		Votes	%	Seats
Labour Party	Ap	49,386	34.36%	4
Conservative Party	H	36,570	25.45%	3
Christian Democratic Party	KrF	23,513	16.36%	2
Centre Party	Sp	13,134	9.14%	1
Liberal Party	V	7,732	5.38%	0
Socialist Left Party	SV	5,490	3.82%	0
Progress Party	FrP	5,373	3.74%	0
Sunnmøre List		1,432	1.00%	0
Red Electoral Alliance	RV	422	0.29%	0
Liberal People's Party	DLF	328	0.23%	0
Pensioners' Party	PP	254	0.18%	0
Communist Party of Norway	K	82	0.06%	0
Valid votes		143,716	100.00%	10
Rejected votes		259	0.18%	
Total polled		143,975	82.31%	
Registered electors		174,915		

The following candidates were elected: Arve Berg (Ap); Kjell Magne Bondevik (KrF); Mary Eide (Ap); Kjell Furnes (KrF); Laila Kaland (Ap); Inger Koppernæs (H); Rikard Olsvik (Ap); Gudmund Restad (Sp); Ingvard Sverdrup (H); and Anders Talleraas (H).

===== 1981 =====
Results of the 1981 parliamentary election held on 13 and 14 September 1981:

Party		Votes	%	Seats
Labour Party	Ap	41,111	29.58%	3
Conservative Party	H	37,585	27.04%	3
Christian Democratic Party	KrF	26,233	18.87%	2
Centre Party	Sp	13,581	9.77%	1
Liberal Party	V	9,922	7.14%	1
Progress Party	FrP	4,649	3.34%	0
Socialist Left Party	SV	4,636	3.34%	0
Red Electoral Alliance	RV	629	0.45%	0
Liberal People's Party	DLF	410	0.29%	0
Communist Party of Norway	K	132	0.09%	0
Plebiscite Party		54	0.04%	0
Free Elected Representatives		43	0.03%	0
Valid votes		138,985	100.00%	10
Rejected votes		117	0.08%	
Total polled		139,102	81.76%	
Registered electors		170,138		

The following candidates were elected: Arve Berg (Ap); Kjell Magne Bondevik (KrF); Mary Eide (Ap); Aslaug Fredriksen (KrF); Inger Koppernæs (H); Oddbjørn Sverre Langlo (H); Rikard Olsvik (Ap); Hans Hammond Rossbach (V); Anders Talleraas (H); and Arnold Weiberg-Aurdal (Sp).

==== 1970s ====
===== 1977 =====
Results of the 1977 parliamentary election held on 11 and 12 September 1977:

Party		Votes	%	Seats
Labour Party	Ap	40,702	31.86%	3
Christian Democratic Party	KrF	29,418	23.03%	3
Conservative Party	H	24,027	18.81%	2
Centre Party	Sp	15,895	12.44%	1
Liberal Party	V	9,907	7.75%	1
Socialist Left Party	SV	3,369	2.64%	0
New People's Party	DNF	1,926	1.51%	0
Progress Party	FrP	1,642	1.29%	0
Red Electoral Alliance	RV	552	0.43%	0
Communist Party of Norway	K	109	0.09%	0
Single Person's Party		90	0.07%	0
Norwegian Democratic Party		65	0.05%	0
Free Elected Representatives		50	0.04%	0
Valid votes		127,752	100.00%	10
Rejected votes		179	0.14%	
Total polled		127,931	81.67%	
Registered electors		156,647		

The following candidates were elected: Arve Berg (Ap); Kjell Magne Bondevik (KrF); Mary Eide (Ap); Aslaug Fredriksen (KrF); Asbjørn Jordahl (Ap); Oddbjørn Sverre Langlo (H); Hans Hammond Rossbach (V); Anders Talleraas (H); Odd Vigestad (KrF); and Arnold Weiberg-Aurdal (Sp).

===== 1973 =====
Results of the 1973 parliamentary election held on 9 and 10 September 1973:

Party		Votes	%	Seats
Labour Party	Ap	30,719	25.95%	3
Christian Democratic Party	KrF	26,507	22.40%	2
Centre Party	Sp	20,063	16.95%	2
Liberal Party	V	13,471	11.38%	1
Conservative Party	H	10,463	8.84%	1
Socialist Electoral League	SV	8,087	6.83%	1
Anders Lange's Party	ALP	5,239	4.43%	0
New People's Party	DNF	3,108	2.63%	0
Red Electoral Alliance	RV	276	0.23%	0
Single Person's Party		203	0.17%	0
Women's Free Elected Representatives		118	0.10%	0
Norwegian Democratic Party		103	0.09%	0
Other		1	0.00%	0
Valid votes		118,358	100.00%	10
Rejected votes		125	0.11%	
Total polled		118,483	79.12%	
Registered electors		149,744		

The following candidates were elected: Arve Berg (Ap); Kjell Magne Bondevik (KrF); Alv Jakob Fostervoll (Ap); Arnt Gudleik Hagen (Sp); Oddbjørn Sverre Langlo (H); Ola Langset (SV); Hans Hammond Rossbach (V); Kåre Stokkeland (Ap); Odd Vigestad (KrF); and Arnold Weiberg-Aurdal (Sp).

==== 1960s ====
===== 1969 =====
Results of the 1969 parliamentary election held on 7 and 8 September 1969:

Party		Votes	%	Seats
Labour Party	Ap	41,497	35.60%	3
Centre Party	Sp	21,127	18.13%	2
Christian Democratic Party	KrF	21,027	18.04%	2
Liberal Party	V	19,481	16.71%	2
Conservative Party	H	10,877	9.33%	1
Socialist People's Party	SF	2,189	1.88%	0
Communist Party of Norway	K	353	0.30%	0
Valid votes		116,551	100.00%	10
Rejected votes		268	0.23%	
Total polled		116,819	81.67%	
Registered electors		143,046		

The following candidates were elected: Bjarne Flem (V); Alv Jakob Fostervoll (Ap); Arnt Gudleik Hagen (Sp); Peter Kjeldseth Moe (Ap); Sverre Bernhard Nybø (H); Hans Hammond Rossbach (V); Arne Sæter (KrF); Kåre Stokkeland (Ap); Odd Vigestad (KrF); and Arnold Weiberg-Aurdal (Sp).

===== 1965 =====
Results of the 1965 parliamentary election held on 12 and 13 September 1965:

Party		Votes	%	Seats
Labour Party	Ap	36,055	32.82%	3
Centre Party	Sp	21,042	19.16%	2
Christian Democratic Party	KrF	18,531	16.87%	2
Liberal Party	V	18,390	16.74%	2
Conservative Party	H	11,154	10.15%	1
Socialist People's Party	SF	4,673	4.25%	0
Wild Votes		6	0.01%	0
Valid votes		109,851	100.00%	10
Rejected votes		537	0.49%	
Total polled		110,388	82.56%	
Registered electors		133,702		

The following candidates were elected: Bjarne Flem (V); Ola Johan Gjengedal (KrF); Arnt Gudleik Hagen (Sp); Olav Rasmussen Langeland (Sp); Peter Kjeldseth Moe (Ap); Sverre Bernhard Nybø (H); Hans Hammond Rossbach (V); Anders Sæterøy (Ap); Kåre Stokkeland (Ap); and Knut Toven (KrF).

===== 1961 =====
Results of the 1961 parliamentary election held on 11 September 1961:

Party		Votes	%	Seats
Labour Party	Ap	34,124	34.69%	4
Christian Democratic Party	KrF	20,845	21.19%	2
Liberal Party	V	15,849	16.11%	2
Centre Party	Sp	13,342	13.56%	1
Conservative Party	H	9,340	9.49%	1
Socialist People's Party	SF	4,144	4.21%	0
Communist Party of Norway	K	733	0.75%	0
Valid votes		98,377	100.00%	10
Rejected votes		471	0.48%	
Total polled		98,848	75.30%	
Registered electors		131,275		

The following candidates were elected: Ivar Kornelius Eikrem (Ap), 34,121 votes; Einar Hareide (KrF), 20,841 votes; Olav Rasmussen Langeland (Sp), 13,339 votes; Kristian Langlo (V), 15,851 votes; Peter Kjeldseth Moe (Ap), 34,121 votes; Claus Marius Neergaard (Ap), 34,107 votes; Sverre Bernhard Nybø (H), 9,342 votes; Anders Sæterøy (Ap), 34,124 votes; Sivert Todal (V), 15,845 votes; and Knut Toven (KrF), 20,842 votes.

==== 1950s ====
===== 1957 =====
Results of the 1957 parliamentary election held on 7 October 1957:

Party		Votes	%	Seats
Labour Party	Ap	37,166	38.08%	4
Christian Democratic Party	KrF	21,601	22.13%	2
Liberal Party	V	17,167	17.59%	2
Farmers' Party	Bp	12,438	12.74%	1
Conservative Party	H	8,377	8.58%	1
Communist Party of Norway	K	860	0.88%	0
Valid votes		97,609	100.00%	10
Rejected votes		524	0.53%	
Total polled		98,133	75.35%	
Registered electors		130,242		

The following candidates were elected: Ivar Kornelius Eikrem (Ap); Bjarne Fjærtoft (V); Einar Hareide (KrF); Olav Rasmussen Langeland (Bp); Peter Kjeldseth Moe (Ap); Sverre Bernhard Nybø (H); Ulrik Olsen (Ap); Anders Sæterøy (Ap); Sivert Todal (V); and Knut Toven (KrF).

===== 1953 =====
Results of the 1953 parliamentary election held on 12 October 1953:

Party		Votes	%	Seats
Labour Party	Ap	35,978	36.97%	4
Christian Democratic Party	KrF	22,396	23.01%	2
Liberal Party	V	16,403	16.86%	2
Farmers' Party	Bp	12,496	12.84%	1
Conservative Party	H	8,637	8.88%	1
Communist Party of Norway	K	1,402	1.44%	0
Valid votes		97,312	100.00%	10
Rejected votes		543	0.55%	
Total polled		97,855	76.23%	
Registered electors		128,366		

The following candidates were elected: Anton Ludvig Alvestad (Ap); Ivar Kornelius Eikrem (Ap); Bjarne Fjærtoft (V); Einar Hareide (KrF); Olav Rasmussen Langeland (Bp); Sverre Bernhard Nybø (H); Ulrik Olsen (Ap); Anders Sæterøy (Ap); Knut Olaf Andreasson Strand (V); and Knut Toven (KrF).

==== 1940s ====
===== 1949 =====
Results of the 1949 parliamentary election held on 10 October 1949:

Party		Votes	%	Seats
Christian Democratic Party	KrF	26,179	35.11%	3
Labour Party	Ap	24,073	32.29%	2
Liberal Party	V	17,314	23.22%	2
Conservative Party	H	5,572	7.47%	0
Society Party	Samfp	950	1.27%	0
Communist Party of Norway	K	465	0.62%	0
Wild Votes		3	0.00%	0
Valid votes		74,556	100.00%	7
Rejected votes		510	0.68%	
Total polled		75,066	77.12%	
Registered electors		97,336		

The following candidates were elected: Peder Alsvik (Ap); Haldor Bjerkeseth (KrF); Einar Hareide (KrF); Olav Oksvik (Ap); Knut Olaf Andreasson Strand (V); Knut Toven (KrF); and Trygve Utheim (V).

===== 1945 =====
Results of the 1945 parliamentary election held on 8 October 1945:

Party		Votes	%	Seats
Christian Democratic Party	KrF	18,634	29.52%	2
Labour Party	Ap	18,495	29.30%	2
Liberal Party	V	13,245	20.98%	2
Farmers' Party	Bp	10,337	16.38%	1
Conservative Party	H	1,329	2.11%	0
Communist Party of Norway	K	1,079	1.71%	0
Wild Votes		2	0.00%	0
Valid votes		63,121	100.00%	7
Rejected votes		404	0.64%	
Total polled		63,525	71.50%	
Registered electors		88,840		

The following candidates were elected: Peder Alsvik (Ap); Einar Hareide (KrF); Olav Oksvik (Ap); Hans Ingvald Hansen Ratvik (V); Sverre Reiten (KrF); Lars Sverkeson Romundstad (Bp); and Trygve Utheim (V).

==== 1930s ====
===== 1936 =====
Results of the 1936 parliamentary election held on 19 October 1936:

Party		Party			List Alliance		
Party		Votes	%	Seats	Votes	%	Seats
Liberal Party	V	22,000	35.47%	3	23,266	37.51%	3
Møre Fishing and Smallholder Party	FS	1,268	2.04%	0	23,266	37.51%	3
Farmers' Party	Bp	15,830	25.52%	2	19,499	31.44%	2
Civic Assembly in Møre og Romsdal	BS	2,773	4.47%	0	19,499	31.44%	2
Active Fishermen	AF	902	1.45%	0	19,499	31.44%	2
Labour Party	Ap	15,803	25.48%	2	15,803	25.48%	2
Society Party	Samfp	3,257	5.25%	0	3,257	5.25%	0
Nasjonal Samling	NS	194	0.31%	0	194	0.31%	0
Wild Votes		1	0.00%	0	1	0.00%	0
Valid votes		62,028	100.00%	7	62,020	100.00%	7
Rejected votes		307	0.49%				
Total polled		62,335	80.76%				
Registered electors		77,186					

As the list alliance were not entitled to more seats contesting as alliances than they were contesting as individual parties, the distribution of seats was as party votes.

The following candidates were elected: Peder Alsvik (Ap); Ola Olson Dønheim (V); Rasmus Olsen Langeland (Bp); Olav Oksvik (Ap); Lars Sverkeson Romundstad (Bp); Knut Olaf Andreasson Strand (V); and Peter Ørger Pedersen Syltebø (V).

===== 1933 =====
Results of the 1933 parliamentary election held on 16 October 1933:

Party		Party			List Alliance		
Party		Votes	%	Seats	Votes	%	Seats
Liberal Party	V	17,131	33.43%	3	19,444	37.98%	3
Sunnmøre, Romsdal and Nordmøre Young Left	UV	2,351	4.59%	0	19,444	37.98%	3
Farmers' Party	Bp	15,896	31.02%	2	17,798	34.76%	3
Møre Fishing and Smallholder Party	FS	1,910	3.73%	0	17,798	34.76%	3
Labour Party	Ap	11,393	22.23%	2	11,393	22.25%	1
Civic Assembly in Møre	BS	1,591	3.10%	0	1,591	3.11%	0
Society Party	Samfp	973	1.90%	0	973	1.90%	0
Wild Votes		1	0.00%	0	1	0.00%	0
Valid votes		51,246	100.00%	7	51,200	100.00%	7
Rejected votes		186	0.36%				
Total polled		51,432	69.94%				
Registered electors		73,540					

As the list alliances were entitled to more seats contesting as alliances than they were contesting as individual parties, the distribution of seats was as list alliance votes. The Bp-FS list alliance's additional seat was allocated to the Farmers' Party.

The following candidates were elected: Ole Rasmus Knutsen Flem (V); Rasmus Olsen Langeland (Bp); Olav Oksvik (Ap); Lars Sverkeson Romundstad (Bp); Johan Martin Jakobsen Strand (V); Peter Ørger Pedersen Syltebø (V); and Nils Trædal (Bp).

===== 1930 =====
Results of the 1930 parliamentary election held on 20 October 1930:

Party		Votes	%	Seats
Liberal Party	V	27,271	50.56%	4
Farmers' Party	Bp	15,731	29.17%	2
Labour Party	Ap	7,764	14.39%	1
Civic Assembly in Møre	BS	3,171	5.88%	0
Valid votes		53,937	100.00%	7
Rejected votes		160	0.30%	
Total polled		54,097	76.91%	
Registered electors		70,337		

The following candidates were elected: Olav Eysteinson Fjærli (V); Ole Rasmus Knutsen Flem (V); Rasmus Olsen Langeland (Bp); Olav Oksvik (Ap); Lars Sverkeson Romundstad (Bp); Johan Martin Jakobsen Strand (V); and Ole N. Strømme (V).

==== 1920s ====
===== 1927 =====
Results of the 1927 parliamentary election held on 17 October 1927:

Party		Votes	%	Seats
Liberal Party	V	21,294	48.82%	4
Farmers' Party	Bp	11,511	26.39%	2
Labour Party	Ap	8,240	18.89%	1
Conservative Party–Free-minded Liberal Party	H-FV	2,569	5.89%	0
Wild Votes		3	0.01%	0
Valid votes		43,617	100.00%	7
Rejected votes		480	1.09%	
Total polled		44,097	64.80%	
Registered electors		68,048		

The following candidates were elected: Olav Eysteinson Fjærli (V); Ole Rasmus Knutsen Flem (V); Rasmus Olsen Langeland (Bp); Olav Oksvik (Ap); Lars Sverkeson Romundstad (Bp); Johan Martin Jakobsen Strand (V); and Anders Vassbotn (V).

===== 1924 =====
Results of the 1924 parliamentary election held on 21 October 1924:

Party		Votes	%	Seats
Liberal Party	V	21,846	48.60%	4
Farmers' Party	Bp	10,952	24.36%	2
Conservative Party–Free-minded Liberal Party	H-FV	5,487	12.21%	1
Social Democratic Labour Party of Norway	S	4,714	10.49%	0
Labour Party	Ap	1,749	3.89%	0
Communist Party of Norway	K	195	0.43%	0
Wild Votes		10	0.02%	0
Valid votes		44,953	100.00%	7
Rejected votes		613	1.35%	
Total polled		45,566	69.64%	
Registered electors		65,430		

The following candidates were elected: Olav Eysteinson Fjærli (V); Ole Rasmus Knutsen Flem (V); Kristoffer Høgset (Bp); Rasmus Olsen Langeland (Bp); Johan Martin Jakobsen Strand (V); Anders Vassbotn (V); and Bastian Adolf Width (H-FV).

===== 1921 =====
Results of the 1921 parliamentary election held on 24 October 1921:

Party		Votes	%	Seats
Liberal Party	V	22,485	51.86%	5
Norwegian Farmers' Association	L	10,355	23.88%	2
Conservative Party–Free-minded Liberal Party	H-FV	4,366	10.07%	0
Social Democratic Labour Party of Norway	S	3,449	7.95%	0
Labour Party	Ap	2,669	6.16%	0
Wild Votes		36	0.08%	0
Valid votes		43,360	100.00%	7
Rejected votes		574	1.31%	
Total polled		43,934	67.78%	
Registered electors		64,820		

The following candidates were elected: Olav Eysteinson Fjærli (V); Ole Rasmus Knutsen Flem (V); Kristoffer Høgset (L); Rasmus Olsen Langeland (L); Rasmus Martinus Sivertsen Moltu (V); Jakob Larsen Mork (V); and Anders Vassbotn (V).
