= 1957 Norwegian parliamentary election =

- 7 October 1957

All 150 seats in the Storting 76 seats needed for a majority
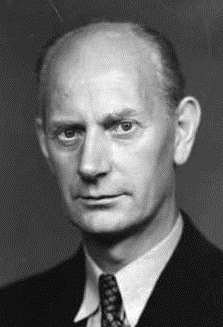

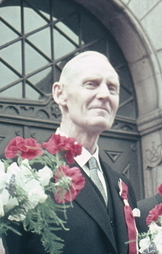

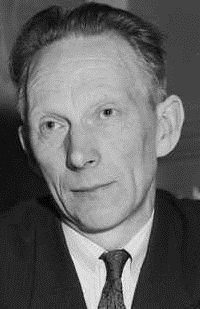

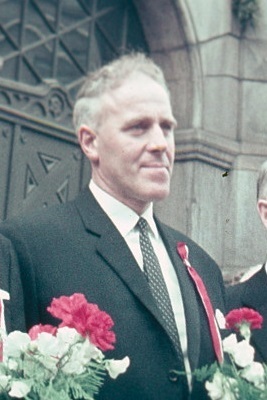

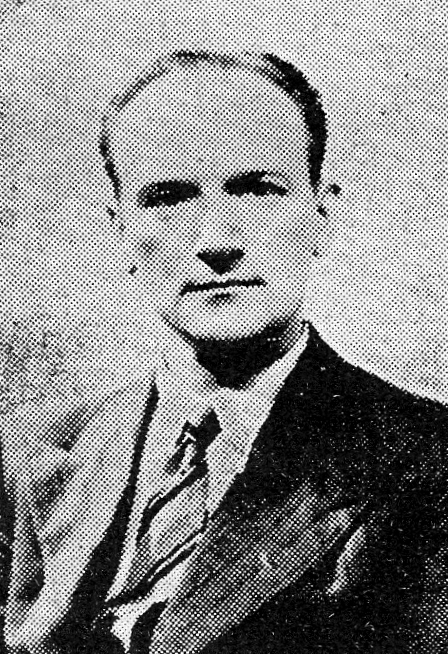
	First party	Second party	Third party
Leader	Einar Gerhardsen	Alv Kjøs	Bent Røiseland
Party	Labour	Conservative	Liberal
Last election	46.7%, 77 seats	18.9%, 27 seats	10.0%, 15 seats
Seats won	78	29	15
Seat change	▲1	▲2	0
Popular vote	865,675	352,755^{[a]}^{[b]}	177,291^{[b]}
Percentage	48.3%	21.7%^{[a]}^{[b]}	10.5%^{[b]}
	Fourth party	Fifth party	Sixth party
Leader	Per Borten	Einar Hareide	Emil Løvlien
Party	Farmers'	Christian; Democratic	Communist
Last election	9.3%, 14 seats,	10.5%, 14 seats	5.1%, 3 seats
Seats won	15	12	1
Seat change	▲1	▼2	▼2
Popular vote	200,237^{[a]}	183,243	60,060
Percentage	9.9%^{[a]}	10.2%	3.4%
- Largest bloc and seats won by constituency
Prime Minister before election
Einar Gerhardsen
Labour
Prime Minister after election
Einar Gerhardsen
Labour

Parliamentary elections were held in Norway on 7 October 1957. The result was a victory for the Labour Party, which won 78 of the 150 seats in the Storting. As a result, the Gerhardsen government continued in office.

This was the last time a single party won a majority of seats on its own in a Norwegian election. This was also the last Norwegian parliamentary election as of 2026 to not be held in September.

== Contesting parties ==
Name		Ideology	Position	Leader	1953 result	
Name		Ideology	Position	Leader	Votes (%)	Seats
Ap	Labour Party; Arbeiderpartiet	Social democracy	Centre-left	Einar Gerhardsen	46.7%	77 / 150
H	Conservative Party; Høyre	Conservatism	Centre-right	Alv Kjøs	18.9%	27 / 150
KrF	Christian Democratic Party; Kristelig Folkeparti	Christian democracy	Centre to centre-right	Einar Hareide	10.5%	14 / 150
V	Liberal Party; Venstre	Social liberalism	Centre	Bent Røiseland	10.0%	15 / 150
Sp	Centre Party; Senterpartiet	Agrarianism	Centre	Per Borten	9.3%	14 / 150
NKP	Communist Party of Norway; Norges Kommunistiske Parti	Communism	Far-left	Emil Løvlien	5.1%	3 / 150

== Newspaper endorsements ==
Newspaper	Party endorsed
Moss Avis	Conservative Party

== Results ==
Party	Votes	%	Seats	+/–
Labour Party	865,675	48.33	78	+1
Conservative Party	301,395	16.83	25	+2
Christian Democratic Party	183,243	10.23	12	–2
Liberal Party	171,407	9.57	15	0
Farmers' Party	154,761	8.64	14	+1
Communist Party	60,060	3.35	1	–2
Farmers'–Conservatives (Note: The joint list of the Farmers' Party and Conservative Party won four seats, three of which were taken by the Conservative Party and one by the Farmers' Party.)	45,476	2.54	4	–
Liberals–Conservatives (Note: The joint list of the Liberal Party and Conservative Party won one seat, taken by the Conservative Party.)	5,884	0.33	1	–
Norwegian Social Democratic Party	2,855	0.16	0	New
Liberal People's Party	249	0.01	0	New
Progress Party	105	0.01	0	New
Wild votes	18	0.00	–	–
Total	1,791,128	100.00	150	0
Valid votes	1,791,128	99.50		
Invalid/blank votes	9,027	0.50		
Total votes	1,800,155	100.00		
Registered voters/turnout	2,298,376	78.32		
Source: Nohlen & Stöver

=== Voter demographics ===
Cohort	Percentage of cohort voting for					
Cohort	Ap	H	V	KrF	Sp	Others
Total vote	48.3%	21.7%	10.5%	10.2%	9.9%	
Gender
Female	47.8%	15.7%	9.6%	13.2%	9.6%	
Male	48.9%	17.8%	9.6%	7.4%	7.7%	
Age
18–30 years old	58.5%	17.1%	8.3%	5.7%	5.7%	
30–59 years old	48.5%	15.5%	10.3%	9.5%	8.8%	
60 years old and older	40.7%	20.3%	8.3%	15.8%	10.8%	
Work
Low income	47.2%	13.1%	7.6%	14%	13.1%	
Average income	59.6%	10.1%	8.7%	8.7%	7%	
High income	38%	28.7%	12.3%	7.6%	5.3%	
Education
Primary school	57.8%	9.5%	8.1%	10.5%	7.4%	
High school	30.7%	24.9%	13.6%	10%	13.9%	
University/college	16.4%	62.7%	10.4%	9%	1.5%	
Source: Norwegian Institute for Social Research

=== Seat distribution ===
Constituency	Total seats	Seats won					
Constituency	Total seats	Ap	H	V	B	KrF	K
Akershus	7	4	2		1		
Aust-Agder	4	2	1			1	
Bergen	5	3	1	1			
Buskerud	7	4	2		1		
Finnmark	4	3	1				
Hedmark	8	5	1		1		1
Hordaland	10	4	1	2	1	2	
Møre og Romsdal	10	4	1	2	1	2	
Nord-Trøndelag	6	3		1	2		
Nordland	12	7	2	1	1	1	
Oppland	7	4	1		2		
Oslo	13	6	5	1		1	
Østfold	8	5	2			1	
Rogaland	10	3	2	2	1	2	
Sogn og Fjordane	5	2		1	1	1	
Sør-Trøndelag	10	5	2	1	1	1	
Telemark	6	4		1	1		
Troms	6	4	1	1			
Vest-Agder	5	2	1	1	1		
Vestfold	7	4	3				
Total	150	78	29	15	15	12	1
Source: Norges Offisielle Statistikk
