= Berit Tønnesen =

Norwegian politician (born 1971)

Berit Tønnesen (born 24 June 1971) is a Norwegian politician for the Labour Party.

She was elected as a deputy representative to the Parliament of Norway from Møre og Romsdal for the term 2021–2025. Hailing from Kristiansund, she was deputy leader of Møre og Romsdal Labour Party.
