= 1961 Norwegian parliamentary election =

- 11 September 1961

All 150 seats in the Storting 76 seats needed for a majority
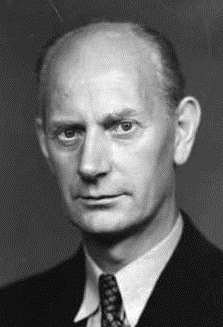

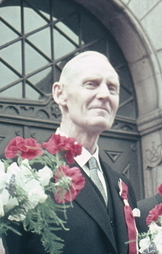

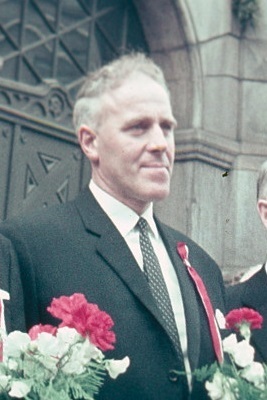

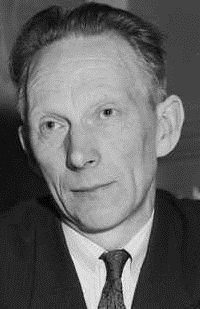
	First party	Second party	Third party
Leader	Einar Gerhardsen	Alv Kjøs	Per Borten
Party	Labour	Conservative	Centre
Last election	78 seats, 48.3%	29 seats, 21.7%	15 seats, 9.9%
Seats won	74	29	16
Seat change	▼4	0	▲1
Popular vote	860,526	373,778^{[b]}	201,465^{[a]}
Percentage	46.8%	20.4%^{[b]}	10.9%^{[a]}
	Fourth party	Fifth party	Sixth party
Leader	Einar Hareide	Bent Røiseland	Knut Løfsnes
Party	Christian; Democratic	Liberal	Socialist People's
Last election	12 seats, 10.2%	15 seats, 10.5%	New
Seats won	15	14	2
Seat change	▲3	▼1	▲2
Popular vote	190,860^{[b]}	208,251^{[a]}	43,996
Percentage	10.4%^{[b]}	11.3%^{[a]}	2.4%
- Largest bloc and seats won by constituency
Prime Minister before election
Einar Gerhardsen
Labour
Prime Minister after election
Einar Gerhardsen
Labour

Parliamentary elections were held in Norway on 11 September 1961. The result was a victory for the Labour Party, which won 74 of the 150 seats in the Storting. Although it lost the absolute majority it had held since 1945, the Labour Party was able to continue in government.

== Contesting parties ==
Name		Ideology	Position	Leader	1957 result	
Name		Ideology	Position	Leader	Votes (%)	Seats
Ap	Labour Party; Arbeiderpartiet	Social democracy	Centre-left	Einar Gerhardsen	48.3%	78 / 150
H	Conservative Party; Høyre	Conservatism	Centre-right	Alv Kjøs	21.7%	29 / 150
V	Liberal Party; Venstre	Social liberalism	Centre	Bent Røiseland	10.5%	15 / 150
KrF	Christian Democratic Party; Kristelig Folkeparti	Christian democracy	Centre to centre-right	Einar Hareide	10.2%	12 / 150
Sp	Centre Party; Senterpartiet	Agrarianism	Centre	Per Borten	9.9%	15 / 150
NKP	Communist Party of Norway; Norges Kommunistiske Parti	Communism	Far-left	Emil Løvlien	2.9%	0 / 150
SF	Socialist People's Party; Sosialistisk Folkeparti	Socialism	Left-wing to Far-left	Knut Løfsnes	2.3%	2 / 150

== Results ==
Party	Votes	%	Seats	+/–
Labour Party	860,526	46.76	74	–4
Conservative Party	354,369	19.26	28	0
Christian Democratic Party	171,451	9.32	14	+3
Liberal Party	132,429	7.20	11	–1
Centre Party	125,643	6.83	11	+1
Centrists–Liberals (Note: The joint list of the Centre Party and the Liberal Party won eight seats, three taken by the Liberal Party and five by the Centre Party.)	75,822	4.12	8	–
Communist Party	53,678	2.92	0	–1
Socialist People's Party	43,996	2.39	2	New
Christians–Conservatives (Note: The joint list of the Conservative Party and the Christian Democratic Party won two seats, with the parties taking one each.)	19,409	1.05	2	–
Free Left Electorate's List	2,360	0.13	0	New
Norwegian Social Democratic Party	478	0.03	0	0
Wild votes	64	0.00	–	–
Total	1,840,225	100.00	150	0
Valid votes	1,840,225	99.44		
Invalid/blank votes	10,323	0.56		
Total votes	1,850,548	100.00		
Registered voters/turnout	2,340,495	79.07		
Source: Nohlen & Stöver

=== Seat distribution ===
Constituency	Total seats	Seats won					
Constituency	Total seats	Ap	H	Sp	KrF	V	SF
Akershus	7	4	2	1			
Aust-Agder	4	2	1			1	
Bergen	5	2	1		1	1	
Buskerud	7	4	2	1			
Finnmark	4	3	1				
Hedmark	8	5	1	2			
Hordaland	10	4	1	1	2	2	
Møre og Romsdal	10	4	1	1	2	2	
Nord-Trøndelag	6	3		2		1	
Nordland	12	6	2	1	2		1
Oppland	7	4	1	2			
Oslo	13	6	5		1		1
Østfold	8	4	2	1	1		
Rogaland	10	3	2	1	2	2	
Sogn og Fjordane	5	2		1	1	1	
Sør-Trøndelag	10	5	2	1	1	1	
Telemark	6	3	1		1	1	
Troms	6	4	1			1	
Vest-Agder	5	2		1	1	1	
Vestfold	7	4	3				
Total	150	74	29	16	15	14	2
Source: Norges Offisielle Statistikk
