= Eli Sollied Øveraas =

Norwegian politician

Eli Sollied Øveraas (born 15 August 1949 in Ørskog Municipality) is a Norwegian politician for the Centre Party (SP). She was elected to the Norwegian Parliament from Møre og Romsdal in 1993. Failing to get re-elected in 1997, she still served as a deputy representative and was elected again in 2001.

She previously worked with local politics in Vestnes Municipality.

== Parliamentary Committee duties ==
She was part of the following parliamentary committees:

- 2005 - 2009 member of the Standing Committee on Transport and Communications.
- 2001 - 2005 member of the Standing Committee on Family and Cultural Affairs.
- 1993 - 1997 secretary of the Standing Committee on Family and Cultural Affairs.
- 1993 - 1997 deputy member of the Electoral Committee.
