= Eikrem =

Eikrem is a surname. Notable people with the surname include:

- Ivar Kornelius Eikrem (1898–1994), Norwegian politician
- Knut Hallvard Eikrem (born 1958), Norwegian footballer
- Kristoffer Eikrem (born 1989), Norwegian jazz musician, composer and photographer
- Magnus Wolff Eikrem (born 1990), Norwegian footballer
