= Jørgen Holte =

Norwegian politician (born 1944)

Jørgen Holte (born 16 May 1944 in Volda) is a Norwegian politician for the Centre Party.

He was elected to the Norwegian Parliament from Møre og Romsdal in 1993, but was not re-elected in 1997. He then instead served in the position of deputy representative during the term 1997–2001. From 1997 to 2000, however, he met as a regular representative meanwhile Gudmund Restad was appointed to the first cabinet Bondevik.

Holte was a member of the municipal council for Volda Municipality from 1975 to 1993.
