= Birgit Oline Kjerstad =

Norwegian politician

Member of the Storting
- In office 1 October 2021 – 30 September 2025
- Constituency: Møre og Romsdal

Personal details
- Born: 11 September 1961 (age 64)
- Party: Socialist Left
- Occupation: Politician

Birgit Oline Kjerstad (born 11 September 1961) is a Norwegian politician.

== Career ==
Hailing from Haram, Kjerstad was born on 11 September 1961.

She was elected representative to the Storting from the constituency of Møre og Romsdal for the period 2021–2025, for the Socialist Left Party.

In the Storting, she was a member of the Standing Committee on Energy and the Environment from 2021 to 2023, and of the Standing Committee on Local Government and Public Administration from 2023 to 2025.
