= Arnt Gudleik Hagen =

Norwegian politician

Arnt Gudleik Hagen (17 August 1928 – 27 July 2007) was a Norwegian politician for the Centre Party.

He was born in Eid Municipality.

He was elected to the Norwegian Parliament from Møre og Romsdal in 1965, and was re-elected on two occasions. He had previously served in the position of deputy representative during the term 1961–1965.

Hagen was a member of the municipal council for Molde Municipality during the term 1963–1967.
