= Steinar Reiten =

Norwegian politician (born 1963)

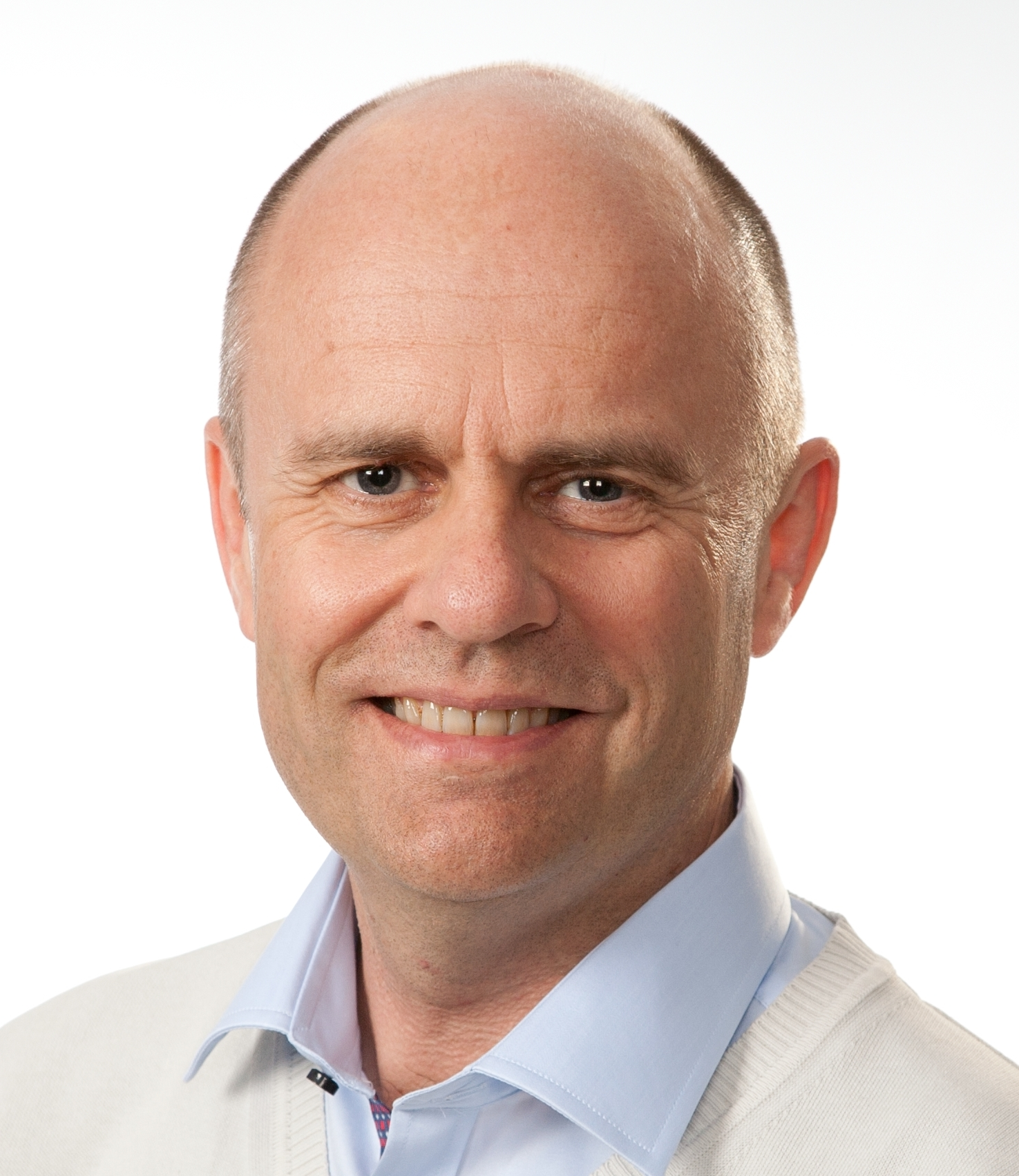
Steinar Reiten

Steinar Reiten (born 10 May 1963) is a Norwegian politician for the Christian Democratic Party.

He served as a deputy representative to the Parliament of Norway from Hedmark during the term 2001–2005 and Møre og Romsdal during the term 2009–2013.
