= Åse Kristin Ask Bakke =

Norwegian politician (born 1996)

- Born: 30 May 1996 (age 30)
- Occupation: Politician
- Political party: Labour Party

Åse Kristin Ask Bakke (born 30 May 1996) is a Norwegian politician for the Labour Party.

== Personal life and education ==
Born on 30 May 1996, Bakke is educated as nurse from the NTNU Ålesund.

== Political career ==
=== Parlament ===
She was elected representative to the Storting from the constituency of Møre og Romsdal for the period 2021–2025, for the Labour Party. In the Storting, she was a member of the Standing Committee on Family and Cultural Affairs from 2021 to 2025.

=== Local politics ===
She was elected member of Sandøy municipal council from 2015 to 2019, and was deputy mayor of Sandøy from 2015 to 2019.
