= Peder Alsvik =

Norwegian politician (1882–1964)

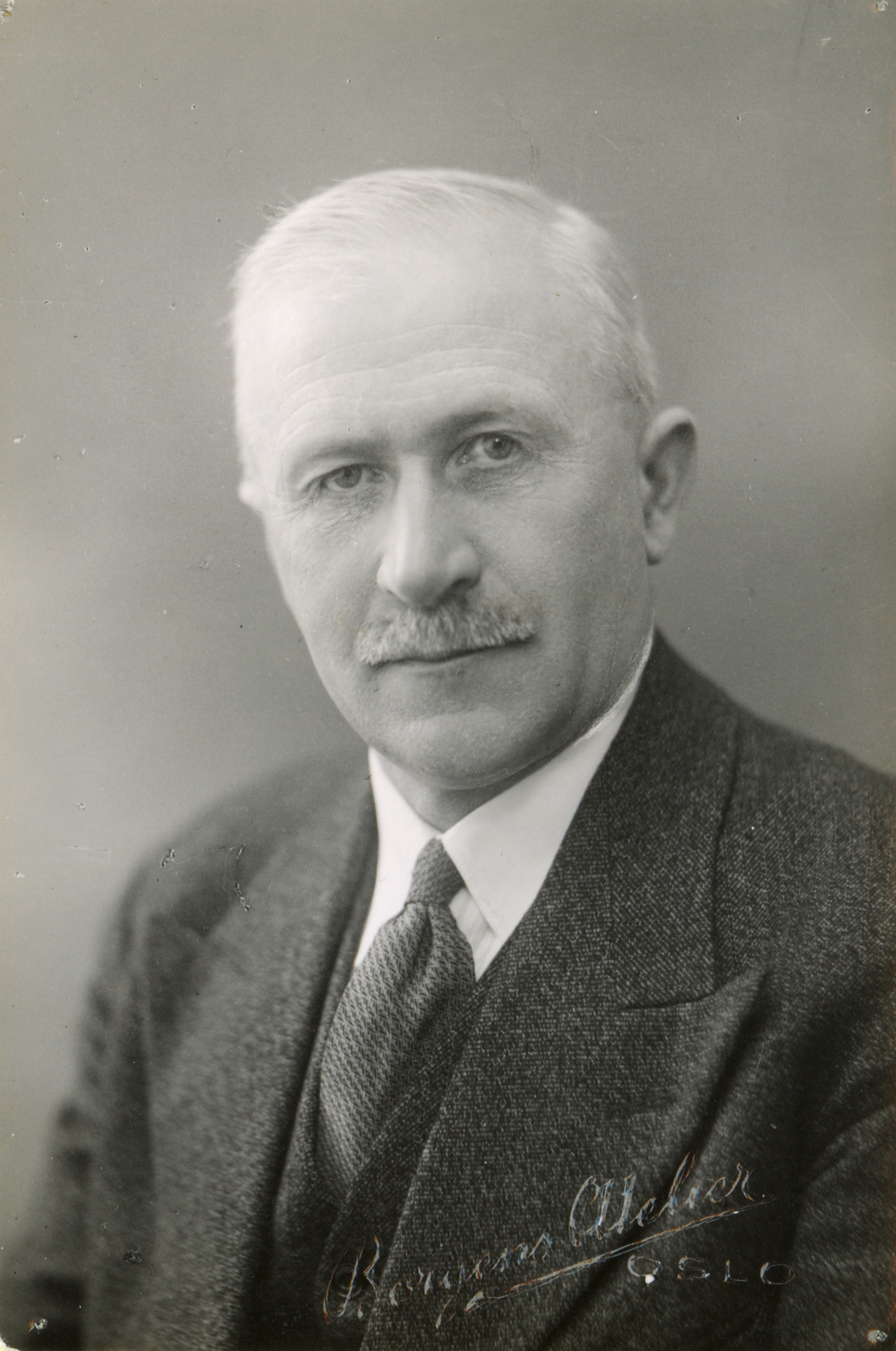
Image of Peder Alsvik

Peder Alsvik (26 June 1882 – 31 December 1964) was a Norwegian politician for the Labour Party.

He was born in Aure Municipality. He was elected to the Norwegian Parliament from Møre og Romsdal in 1937, and was re-elected on two occasions. He had previously served in the position of deputy representative during the terms 1931–1933 and 1934–1936.

On the local level, Alsvik was a member of the municipal council of Bremsnes Municipality from 1916 to 1919 and 1925 to 1934.
