= Standing Committee on Transport and Communications =

Transport Committee, (Established)

The Standing Committee on Transport and Communications (Norwegian: Transport- og kommunikasjonskomiteen) is a standing committee of the Parliament of Norway. It is responsible for policies relating to transport, postal services, telecommunications, electronic communication and the responsibilities of the Norwegian National Coastal Administration. It corresponds to the Ministry of Transport and Communications and the coastal transport portfolio of the Ministry of Fisheries and Coastal Affairs. The committee has 15 members and is chaired by Sigbjørn Gjelsvik of the Centre Party.

== Leadership ==
The committee is headed by a chair and two vice chairs. There was only one vice chair between 1950 and 2001.

Key
Agrarian/Centre Party
Christian Democratic Party
Conservative Party
Labour Party
Liberal Party
Progress Party
Socialist Left Party

=== Chairs ===
| Portrait | Name | Party | Took office | Left office | Tenure |
|---|---|---|---|---|---|
| | Einar Frogner | Agrarian | 23 January 1950 | 10 July 1955 | 5 years, 168 days |
| | Trond Halvorsen Wirstad | Agrarian | 16 January 1956 | 10 January 1958 | 1 year, 359 days |
| | Lars Elisæus Vatnaland | Agrarian/Centre | 27 January 1958 | 30 September 1961 | 3 years, 246 days |
| | Trond Halvorsen Wirstad | Centre | 13 October 1961 | 30 September 1965 | 3 years, 352 days |
| | Nils Kristen Jacobsen | Labour | 15 October 1965 | 13 November 1969 | 4 years, 29 days |
| | Peter Kjeldseth Moe | Labour | 13 November 1969 | 30 June 1973 | 3 years, 229 days |
| | Arnold Weiberg-Aurdal | Centre | 18 October 1973 | 30 September 1981 | 7 years, 347 days |
| | Kjell Borgen | Labour | 21 October 1981 | 30 September 1985 | 3 years, 344 days |
| | Oddrunn Pettersen | Labour | 23 October 1985 | 28 April 1989 | 3 years, 187 days |
| | Solveig Torsvik | Labour | 8 May 1989 | 30 September 1989 | 145 days |
| | John S. Tveit | Christian Democratic | 23 October 1989 | 30 September 1993 | 3 years, 342 days |
| | Magnus Stangeland | Centre | 21 October 1993 | 30 September 1997 | 3 years, 344 days |
| | Oddvard Nilsen | Conservative | 21 October 1997 | 30 September 2001 | 3 years, 344 days |
| | Petter Løvik | Conservative | 22 October 2001 | 30 September 2005 | 3 years, 343 days |
| | Per Sandberg | Progress | 19 October 2005 | 30 September 2009 | 3 years, 346 days |
| | Knut Arild Hareide | Christian Democratic | 20 October 2009 | 30 September 2013 | 3 years, 345 days |
| | Linda Cathrine Hofstad Helleland | Conservative | 22 October 2013 | 16 December 2015 | 2 years, 55 days |
| | Nikolai Astrup | Conservative | 12 January 2016 | 30 September 2017 | 1 year, 261 days |
| | Helge Orten | Conservative | 18 October 2017 | 30 September 2021 | 3 years, 347 days |
| | Erling Sande | Centre | 21 October 2021 | 16 October 2023 | 1 year, 360 days |
| | Sigbjørn Gjelsvik | Centre | 19 October 2023 | 30 September 2025 | 1 year, 346 days |
| | Bård Hoksrud | Progress | 14 October 2025 | present | 1 year, 39 days |

=== Vice chairs ===
==== First vice chairs ====
| Portrait | Name | Party | Took office | Left office | Tenure |
|---|---|---|---|---|---|
| | Anton Ludvig Alvestad | Labour | 23 January 1950 | 2 July 1956 | 6 years, 161 days |
| | Arne Torolf Strøm | Labour | 5 October 1956 | 30 September 1961 | 4 years, 360 days |
| | Isak Larsson Flatabø | Labour | 13 October 1961 | 30 September 1965 | 3 years, 352 days |
| | Trond Halvorsen Wirstad | Centre | 15 October 1965 | 30 September 1969 | 3 years, 350 days |
| | Erling Engan | Centre | 14 October 1969 | 30 September 1973 | 3 years, 351 days |
| | Rolf Fjeldvær | Labour | 18 October 1973 | 30 September 1981 | 7 years, 347 days |
| | Lars Lefdal | Conservative | 21 October 1981 | 30 September 1989 | 7 years, 344 days |
| | Harry Jensen | Progress | 23 October 1989 | 21 December 1990 | 1 year, 59 days |
| | Lodve Solholm | Progress | 11 January 1991 | 30 September 1993 | 2 years, 262 days |
| | Inge Myrvoll | Socialist Left | 21 October 1993 | 30 September 1997 | 3 years, 344 days |
| | Karl Eirik Schjøtt-Pedersen | Labour | 21 October 1997 | 17 March 2000 | 2 years, 148 days |
| | Ola Røtvei | Labour | 23 March 2000 | 30 September 2001 | 1 year, 191 days |
| | Jorunn Ringstad | Centre | 22 October 2001 | 30 September 2005 | 3 years, 343 days |
| | Borghild Tenden | Liberal | 19 October 2005 | 30 September 2009 | 3 years, 346 days |
| | Anne Marit Bjørnflaten | Labour | 20 October 2009 | 30 September 2013 | 3 years, 345 days |
| | Eirin Sund | Labour | 22 October 2013 | 17 June 2015 | 1 year, 238 days |
| | Eirik Sivertsen | Labour | 18 June 2015 | 30 September 2017 | 2 years, 104 days |
| | Morten Stordalen | Progress | 18 October 2017 | 11 February 2020 | 2 years, 116 days |
| | Bård Hoksrud | Progress | 11 February 2020 | 30 September 2021 | 1 year, 231 days |
| | Terje Halleland | Progress | 21 October 2021 | 17 February 2022 | 119 days |
| | Frank Edvard Sve | Progress | 1 March 2022 | 30 September 2025 | 3 years, 213 days |
| | Kamzy Gunaratnam | Labour | 14 October 2025 | 11 September 2026 | 332 days |
| | Even Eriksen | Labour | 6 October 2026 | present | 47 days |

==== Second vice chairs ====
| Portrait | Name | Party | Took office | Left office | Tenure |
|---|---|---|---|---|---|
| | Geir-Ketil Hansen | Socialist Left | 22 October 2001 | 30 September 2005 | 3 years, 343 days |
| | Torstein Rudihagen | Labour | 19 October 2005 | 30 September 2009 | 3 years, 346 days |
| | Bård Hoksrud | Progress | 20 October 2009 | 30 September 2013 | 3 years, 345 days |
| | Abid Raja | Liberal | 22 October 2013 | 30 September 2017 | 3 years, 343 days |
| | Jon Gunnes | Liberal | 18 October 2017 | 30 September 2021 | 3 years, 347 days |
| | Trond Helleland | Conservative | 21 October 2021 | present | 5 years, 32 days |
