= Oskar Jarle Grimstad =

Norwegian politician (born 1954)

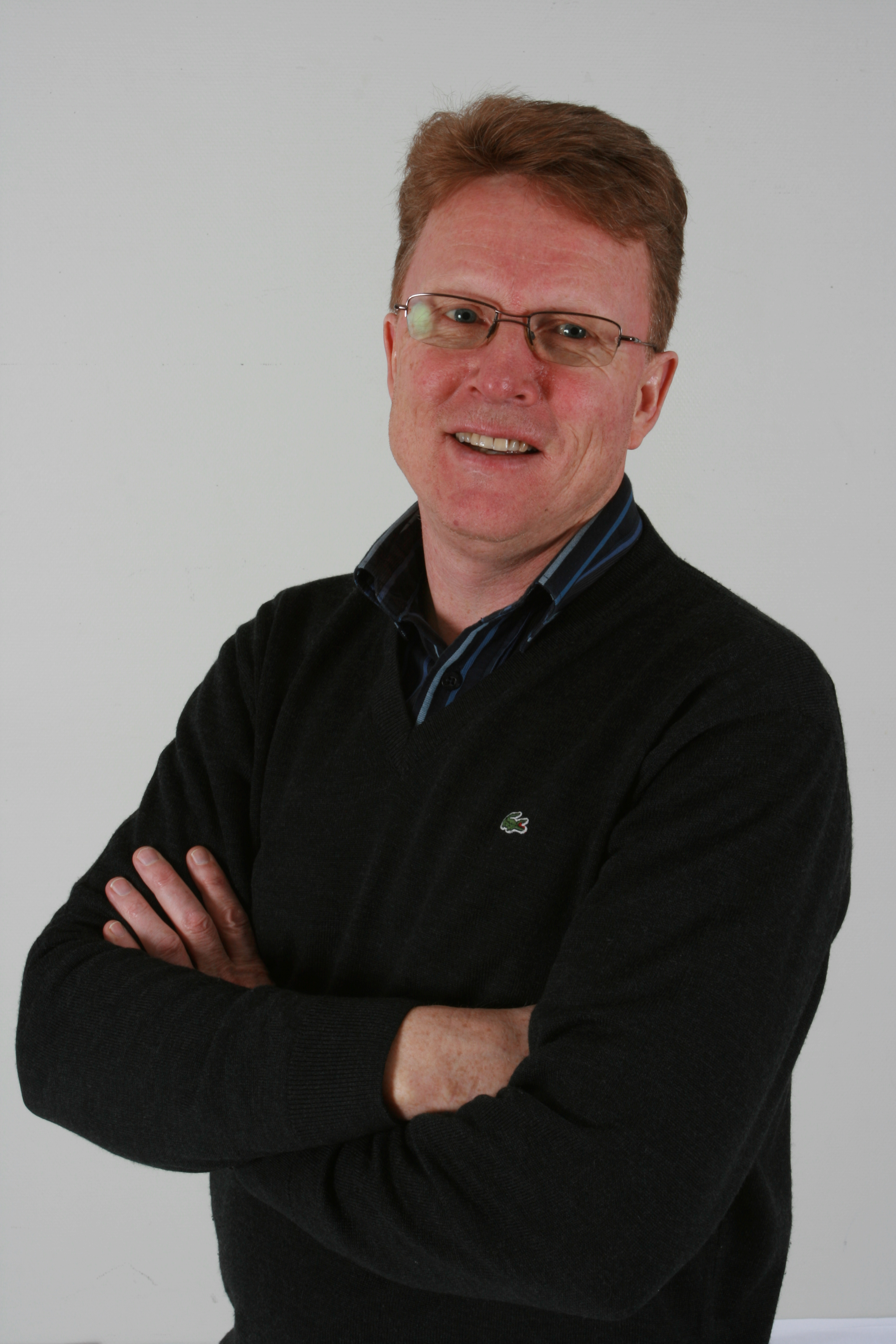
- Grimstad in 2009

Member of Parliament for Møre og Romsdal
- Incumbent
- Assumed office 14 September 2009

Personal details
- Born: 8 November 1954 (age 70); Hareid Municipality, Norway
- Political party: Progress Party
- Spouse: Lillian Grimstad
- Children: 2
- Occupation: Politician

Oskar Jarle Grimstad (born 8 November 1954) is a Norwegian politician representing the Progress Party (FrP) for Møre og Romsdal. He is a member of the Standing Committee on Energy and the Environment.

Grimstad was a member of the Progress Party's central board between 1999 and 2008. Grimstad was deputy mayor of Hareid Municipality between 1999 and 2003, and then a member of the Møre og Romsdal county council between 2003 and 2009. He was successfully nominated for the Storting in second place on FrP's Møre og Romsdal ballot ahead of the 2009 parliamentary election.

Aside from politics, Grimstad has been a seaman, and a welder. Since 1976, he has been the director of three metalworking firms. Grimstad is married and has two daughters. Grimstad's youngest daughter Kamilla (17) died in a fire shortly before Christmas 2008.
