= Arnold Weiberg-Aurdal =

Norwegian politician (1925–2016)

Arnold Weiberg-Aurdal (18 June 1925 – 3 February 2016) was a Norwegian agronomist, military officer and politician for the Centre Party.

He was born in Ålesund as a son of physician Bastian Weiberg-Aurdal (1891–1973) and nurse Elise Ringdal (1892–1959). He finished his secondary education in 1944, took agricultural school in 1945 and infantry training in 1947. He also served in the Independent Norwegian Brigade Group in Germany before graduating from the Norwegian College of Agriculture in 1953. He settled at the farm Velle in Sykkylven Municipality in the same year. He worked as the municipal agronomist for Stranda Municipality from 1954 to 1962 and for Sykkylven Municipality from 1962 to 1982. He was also a conscription officer from 1958 to 1980, with the rank of lieutenant.

He was a member of the municipal council of Sykkylven Municipality from 1955 to 1971 and 1987 to 1991, serving as mayor in 1963–1969 and 1990–1991. From 1963 to 1971 he was also a member of Møre og Romsdal county council. He chaired the local party chapter from 1962 to 1963. He was elected to the Parliament of Norway from Møre og Romsdal in 1969, and was re-elected on three occasions in 1973, 1977 and 1981. He chaired the Standing Committee on Transport and Communications during the two middle periods.

He was also active in the Norwegian Agrarian Association, and from 1961 to 1964 he was a board member of Landslaget for storfeavl and supervisory council member of the Norwegian Red breeders. He was a board member of Privatbanken in Sykkylven from 1960 to 1975, Sunnmørsbanken from 1975 to 1990 (chair until 1980) and Stranda og Sykkylven Billag from 1963 to 1990 (chair since 1973). Nationally he was a board member of Televerket from 1985 to 1993. He was a lay judge in Sunnmøre District Court from 1976 to 1992 and a member of the court of appeal until 2000. In 2003 he was decorated with the King's Medal of Merit in gold.

Political offices
Preceded by	Chair of the Standing Committee on Transport and Communications; 1973–1981	Succeeded by Kjell Borgen
