= Anders Sæterøy =

Norwegian politician

Anders Sæterøy (6 August 1901 – 10 June 1991) was a Norwegian politician for the Labour Party.

He was born in Surnadal Municipality.

He was elected to the Norwegian Parliament from Møre og Romsdal in 1954, and was re-elected on three occasions. He had previously served as a deputy representative in the periods 1945–1949 and 1950–1953.

Sæterøy was mayor of Surnadal Municipality in the periods 1945–1947, 1947–1951 and 1951–1955.
