= Kåre Stokkeland =

Norwegian politician

Kåre Stokkeland (12 July 1918 – 12 August 1985) was a Norwegian politician for the Labour Party.

He was born in Molde.

He was elected to the Norwegian Parliament from Møre og Romsdal in 1965, and was re-elected on two occasions. He had previously served in the position of deputy representative during the terms 1958–1961 and 1961–1965.

Stokkeland was a member of the municipal council of Bolsøy Municipality and later he was on the municipal council of Molde Municipality between 1947 and 1967, serving as mayor of Molde Municipality during the term 1955–1959. He was also a member of Møre og Romsdal county council during the term 1963–1967.
