= Odd Vigestad =

Norwegian politician (1915–1999)

Odd Vigestad (born 28 March 1915 in Borgund Municipality, died 19 January 1999) was a Norwegian politician for the Christian Democratic Party.

He was elected to the Norwegian Parliament from Møre og Romsdal in 1969, and was re-elected on two occasions.

On the local level he was a member of the municipal council of Ålesund Municipality from 1951 to 1968 as well as the terms 1971–1975 and 1983–1987. From 1963 to 1967 he was also a deputy member of Møre og Romsdal county council.

Outside politics he graduated as siviløkonom from NHH in 1941, and worked as a business school teacher in Ålesund.
