= Aslaug Fredriksen =

Norwegian politician

Aslaug Fredriksen (born 9 November 1918 in Vestnes Municipality, died 3 February 2000) was a Norwegian politician for the Christian Democratic Party.

She was elected to the Norwegian Parliament from Møre og Romsdal in 1977, and was re-elected on one occasion. She had previously served as a deputy representative during the term 1973–1977.

On the local level she was a member of the municipal council of Sunndal Municipality from 1967 to 1977.
