= Asmund Kristoffersen =

Norwegian politician

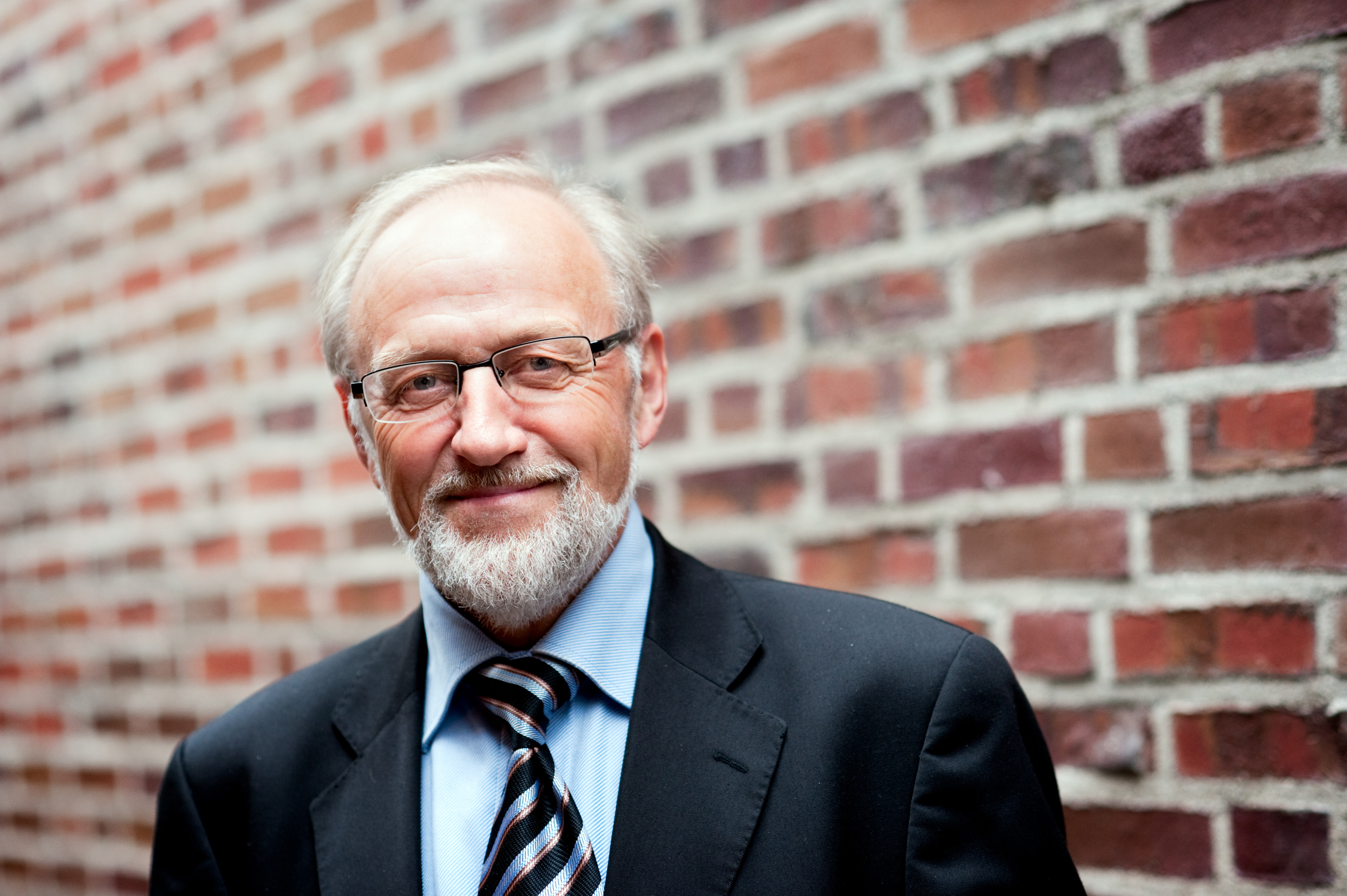

Asmund Kristoffersen (born 5 November 1944 in Flakstad Municipality) is a Norwegian retired politician for the Labour Party.

He was elected to the Norwegian Parliament from Møre og Romsdal in 1993 and has since been re-elected on three occasions.

On the local level he was a member of the municipal council for Tingvoll Municipality from 1979 to 1991 and the Møre og Romsdal county council from 1983 to 1993.

Before becoming a full-time politician, he spent several years in the Norwegian education system: first as a teacher, later as a principal at two different schools, and then as the head of the school administration in Tingvoll Municipality.
