= Karl Sørmo =

Norwegian politician

Karl Per Sørmo (12 April 1936 – 31 January 2025) was a Norwegian politician for the Progress Party.

He was a son of construction worker Helge Julius Sørmo (1913–2001) and housewife Aud Margrete née Martiniussen (1913–1981). He attended primary school in Hadsel Municipality, and after a sailor's education in Ålesund he spent the years 1960 to 1965 at sea. From 1965 to 1966 he attended commerce school in Melbu, and from 1966 until 1990 he worked as a driving school teacher.

He was a member of the municipal council of Hadsel from 1987 to 2003, the last eight years in the executive committee. He chaired the local party chapter from 1988 to 1991 and 1994 to 1999, as well as being a board member of Nordland Progress Party. He served as a deputy representative to the Parliament of Norway from Nordland during the term 1989–1993. Already in December 1990 the regular representative Harry Jensen died, and Sørmo became a regular representative. He was a member of the Standing Committee on Consumer Affairs and Administration.
