= Bjørn Jacobsen =

Norwegian politician (born 1960)

Bjørn Jacobsen (born 11 June 1960 in Sandnessjøen, Helgeland) is a Norwegian politician for the Socialist Left Party (SV). He was elected to the Norwegian Parliament from Møre og Romsdal in 2001.

He was a member of the municipal council of Harstad Municipality from 1983 to 1985, and a deputy member in Molde Municipality from 1995 to 1999.

== Parliamentary Committee duties ==
- 2005 – 2009 member of the Enlarged Foreign Affairs Committee.
- 2005 – 2009 member of the Standing Committee on Defence.
- 2005 – 2009 deputy member of the Electoral Committee.
- 2001 – 2005 member of the Enlarged Foreign Affairs Committee.
- 2001 – 2005 member of the Standing Committee on Foreign Affairs.
- 2001 – 2005 deputy member of the Electoral Committee.
