= Per Vidar Kjølmoen =

Norwegian politician

Member of the Storting
- Incumbent
- Assumed office 1 October 2021
- Constituency: Møre og Romsdal

Personal details
- Born: 3 May 1973 (age 53)
- Party: Labour Party
- Education: Norwegian University of Science and Technology
- Occupation: Politician

Per Vidar Kjølmoen (born 3 May 1973) is a Norwegian politician for the Labour Party. He has been a member of the Storting since 2021.

== Career ==
Born on 3 May 1973, Kjølmoen hails from Inderøy Municipality. He graduated as cand.mag. in political science from the Norwegian University of Science and Technology in 2000. He has worked as journalist, and was chief editor of the newspaper Åndalsnes avis from 2002 to 2008.

He was elected representative to the Storting from the constituency of Møre og Romsdal in 2021, for the Labour Party. He got re-elected in 2025.
