= Monica Molvær =

Norwegian politician (born 1986)

Member of the Storting
- Incumbent
- Assumed office 1 October 2025
- Constituency: Møre og Romsdal

Personal details
- Born: 4 January 1986 (age 40)
- Party: Conservative Party

Monica Molvær (born 4 January 1986) is a Norwegian politician who was elected member of the Storting in 2025. From 2017 to 2025, she was a deputy member of the Storting.
