= Geir Inge Lien =

Norwegian politician

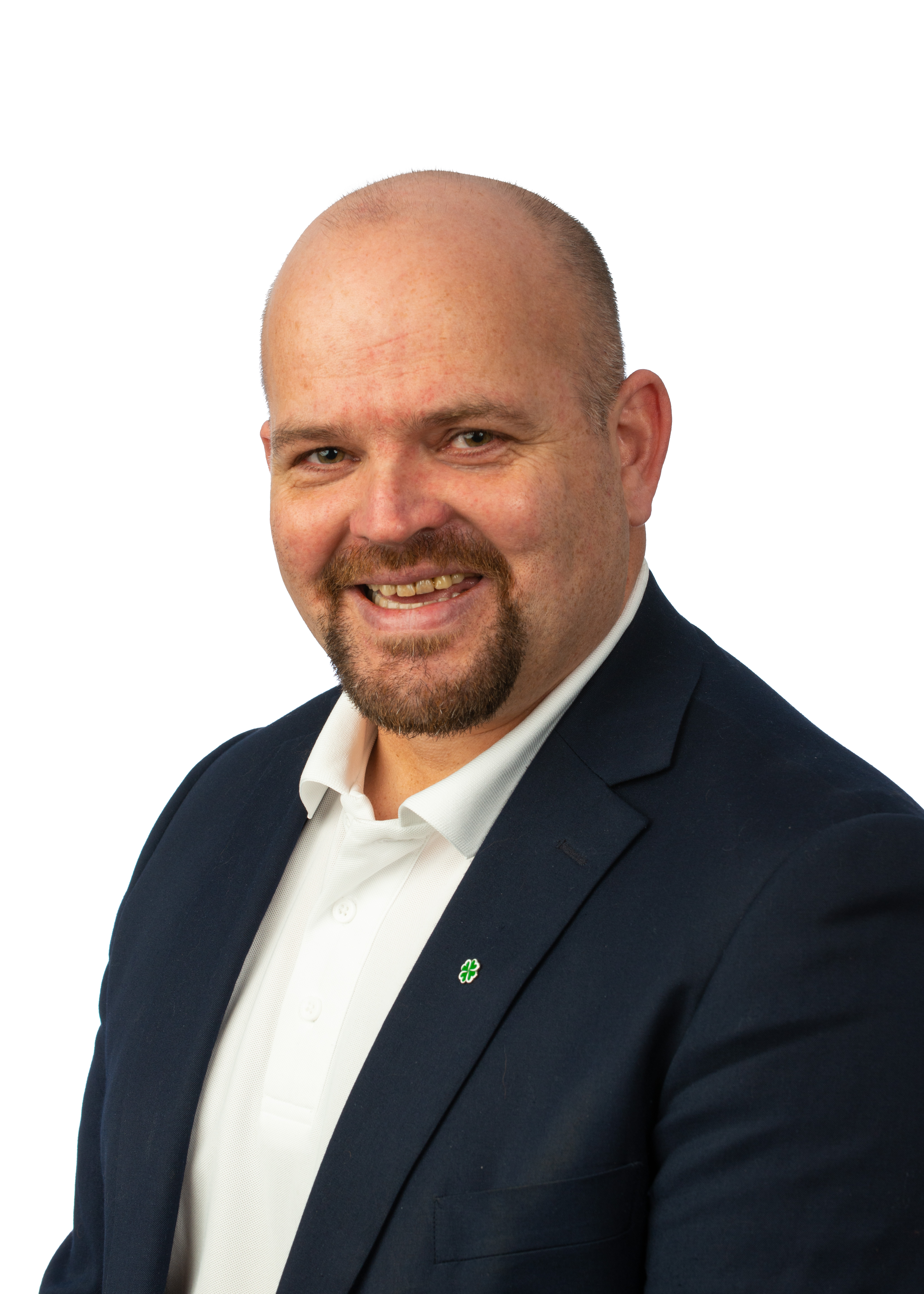
- Lien in 2019

Member of the Storting
- Incumbent
- Assumed office 1 October 2021
- Constituency: Møre og Romsdal

Personal details
- Born: 30 May 1972 (age 53)
- Political party: Centre

Geir Inge Lien (born 30 May 1972) is a Norwegian politician for the Centre Party.

He served as a deputy representative to the Parliament of Norway from Møre og Romsdal during the terms 2009–2013, 2013–2017 and 2017–2021. On the local level he became mayor of Vestnes Municipality in 2011.
