= Petter Løvik =

Norwegian politician

Petter Løvik (11 July 1949 – 3 December 2007) was a Norwegian politician for the Conservative Party.

He was elected to the Norwegian Parliament from Møre og Romsdal in 1997 and was re-elected on two occasions. He had previously served in the position of deputy representative during the terms 1989–1993 and 1993–1997.

Løvik was born in Volda and held various positions in the municipal council for Volda Municipality from 1979 to 1997. From 1987 to 1991 he was deputy member of Møre og Romsdal county council.

He died from cancer in December 2007 at the age of 58.

Political offices
Preceded by Oddvard Nilsen	Chair of the Standing Committee on Transport; 2001–2005	Succeeded by Per Sandberg
