= Laila Kaland =

Norwegian politician

Laila Kaland (8 January 1939 – 30 December 2007) was a Norwegian politician for the Labour Party. She was born in Gloppen Municipality.

She was elected to the Norwegian Parliament from Møre og Romsdal in 1985, and was re-elected on three occasions. She had previously served in the position of deputy representative during the terms 1981–1985.

Kaland was a member of the municipal council of Sykkylven Municipality between 1975 and 1985, and a member of the Møre og Romsdal county council between 1979 and 1985.
