= Harry Jensen (Norwegian politician) =

Norwegian politician

Harry Magnus Jensen (18 February 1940 – 21 December 1990) was a Norwegian politician for the Progress Party.

He was born in Gildeskål Municipality as a son of fisher Wilhelm Jensen and housewife Valborg Wilhelmsen. He took basic education in Bodø, and spent his career as a businessman.

He was a deputy member of the municipal council of Bodø Municipality from 1975 to 1979, member of Nordland county council from 1979 to 1986 and member of the county council's executive committee from 1987 to 1991. He chaired the countywide party chapter from 1976 to 1981 and was a member of the Progress Party central committee from 1985 to 1990. He was elected to the Parliament of Norway from Nordland in 1989, and was the deputy chair of the Standing Committee on Transport and Communications. He died in December 1990 and was replaced by Karl Sørmo.
