= Knut Olaf Andreasson Strand =

Norwegian politician

Knut Olaf Andreasson Strand (7 December 1887 – 16 February 1980) was a Norwegian politician for the Liberal Party.

He was elected to the Norwegian Parliament from Møre og Romsdal in 1937, and was re-elected on two occasions. He had previously served in the position of deputy representative during the terms 1931–1933 and 1934–1936.

Strand was born in Ulstein Municipality and a member of the municipal council for Ulstein Municipality in the periods 1913–1928, 1931–1934 and 1945–1947, serving as mayor in 1922–1925. He was also a member of Møre og Romsdal county council.
