= Bergen (Storting constituency) =

Constituency of the Storting, the national legislature of Norway

- Former constituency for the Storting
- Bergen in Hordaland County

Former constituency
- Abolished: 1973

Bergen was a multi-member constituency of the Storting, the national legislature of Norway. The constituency was merged into the Hordaland constituency in 1973 after the city of Bergen lost its county status in 1972.

== Members ==
Constituency	Total seats	Seats won						
Constituency	Total seats	Ap	H	Sp	KrF	V	K	Sfp
1969	5	2	1		1	1		
1965	5	2	1		1	1		
1961	5	2	1		1	1		
1957	5	3	1			1		
1953	5	3	1			1		
1949	5	3	1			1		
1945	5	2	1			1	1	
1936	5	2	1			2		
1933	5	2	1			1		1
1930	5	2	2			1		
1927	5	1	2			1	1	
1924	5		2			1	2	
1921	5	1	3			1		
