= Olav Rasmussen Langeland =

Norwegian politician

Olav Rasmussen Langeland (14 March 1904 – 18 December 1981) was a Norwegian politician for the Centre Party.

He was born in Vikør Municipality. His father was Rasmus Olsen Langeland, a Member of Parliament and Minister of Labour from 1931–1933.

Olav Langeland was elected to the Norwegian Parliament from Møre og Romsdal in 1954, and was re-elected on three occasions.

Langeland was a member of the municipal council for Borgund Municipality in the period 1951–1955.
