= Oddbjørn Sverre Langlo =

Norwegian politician (1935–2004)

Oddbjørn Sverre Langlo (20 April 1935 in Stranda Municipality – 21 July 2004) was a Norwegian politician for the Conservative Party.

He was elected to the Norwegian Parliament from Møre og Romsdal in 1977, and was re-elected on two occasions. On the local level he was a member of the municipal council of Stranda Municipality from 1967 to 1975.

Outside politics he graduated as siviløkonom from the Norwegian School of Economics and Business Administration in 1961, and spent the rest of his career as a businessman in his native Stranda.
