= Lars Elisæus Vatnaland =

Norwegian politician (1892–1983)

Lars Elisæus Vatnaland (18 April 1892 – 9 March 1983) is a Norwegian politician for the Farmer's Party.

He was elected to the Norwegian Parliament from Rogaland in 1945, and was re-elected on three occasions. He had previously served in the position of deputy representative during the terms 1934–1936 and 1937–1945.

Vatnaland was born in Bokn Municipality and served as mayor of Bokn Municipality from 1925 to 1934, and deputy mayor in 1937–1941 and 1945. He was also a member of Rogaland county council from 1925 to 1934.

Political offices
Preceded by Trond Halvorsen Wirstad	Chair of the Standing Committee on Transport; 1958–1961	Succeeded by Trond Halvorsen Wirstad
