= Jenny Klinge =

Norwegian politician

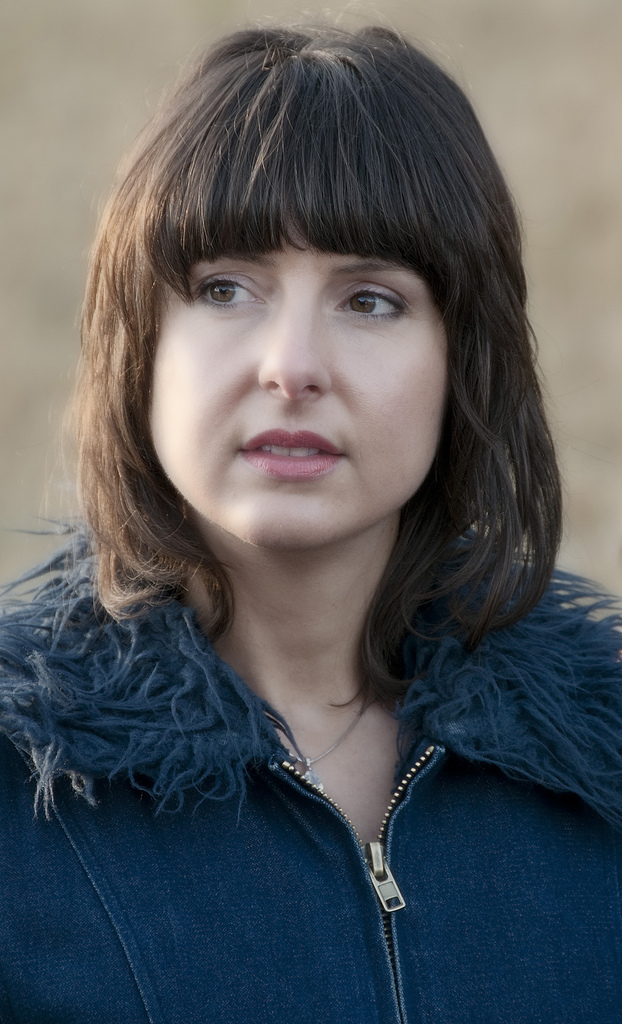
Jenny Klinge

Jenny Klinge (born 28 November 1975) is a Norwegian politician for the Centre Party. She has served as a member of parliament for Møre og Romsdal since 2009, and previously as a deputy member from 2005 to 2009.

== Political career ==
=== Parliament ===
She served as a deputy representative to the Norwegian Parliament from Møre og Romsdal during the term 2005–2009. She was elected to a full term for the 2009–2013 term. She was re-elected in 2013, 2017 and 2021. She sits on the Standing Committee on Justice.

In April 2024, she announced that she wouldn't be seeking re-election at the 2025 election.

=== Local politics ===
On the local level, she is a former deputy mayor of Surnadal Municipality.

== Political positions ==
=== Circumcision ===
In 2012, she stated that male circumcision for religious reasons should be prohibited in the same way that female genital mutilation is.
