= Elisabeth Røbekk Nørve =

Norwegian politician

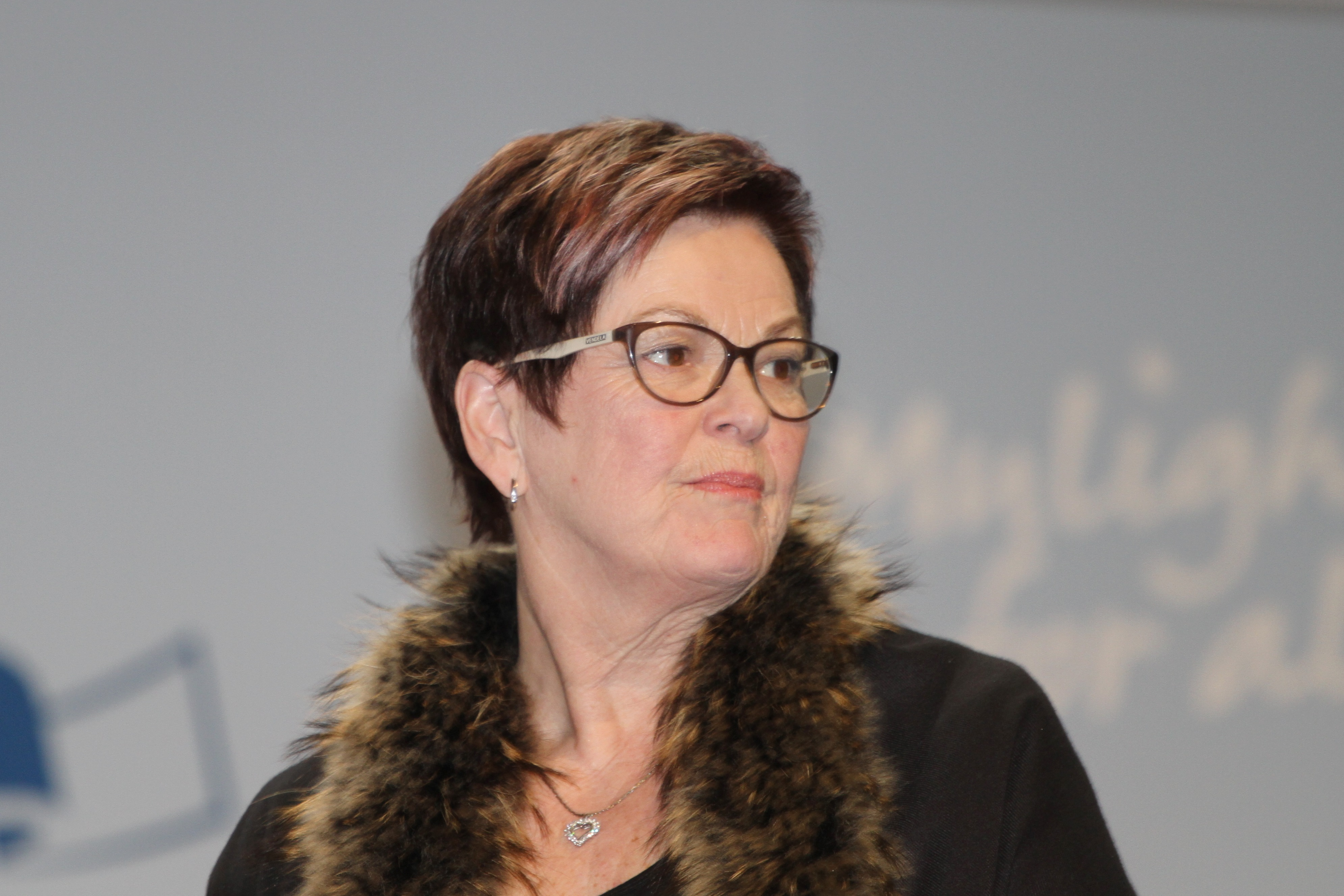
Elisabeth Røbekk Nørve in 2017

Elisabeth Røbekk Nørve (born 29 March 1951 in Borgund Municipality) is a Norwegian politician for the Conservative Party.

She was elected to the Norwegian Parliament from Møre og Romsdal in 2001, but she was not re-elected in 2005. She served in the position of deputy representative during the terms 1997–2001 and 2005–2009, when she was elected to the Stortinget once more.

Nørve held various positions on the municipal council from Ålesund Municipality from 1995 to 2003. From 1995 to 2001 she was also involved in Møre og Romsdal county council.
