= Harry Valderhaug =

Norwegian politician (born 1965)

Member of the Storting
- Incumbent
- Assumed office 1 October 2025
- Constituency: Møre og Romsdal

Deputy Mayor of Giske
- In office 19 October 2023 – 23 October 2025
- Mayor: Kenneth Langvatn (H)
- Preceded by: Kåre Sæter (Ap)
- Succeeded by: Marit Gunnlaug Alnes (KrF)

Mayor of Giske
- In office 14 October 2015 – 19 October 2023
- Deputy: Britt Giske Andersen (V) (2015-2019); Kåre Sæter (Ap) (2019-2023)
- Preceded by: Knut Støbakk (KrF)
- Succeeded by: Kenneth Langvatn (H)

Personal details
- Born: 4 September 1965 (age 60)
- Party: Christian Democratic

Harry Valderhaug (born 4 September 1965) is a Norwegian politician from the Christian Democratic Party (KrF). He was elected to the Storting in the 2025 Norwegian parliamentary election. Valderhaug previously served as mayor of Giske for 8 years.

== Personal life ==
He and his wife Heidi have four children and four grandchildren.

== See also ==
- List of members of the Storting, 2025–2029
