= Trond Halvorsen Wirstad =

Norwegian politician

Trond Halvorsen Wirstad (15 June 1904 – 4 October 1985) was a Norwegian politician for the Centre Party.

He was elected to the Norwegian Parliament from Oppland in 1950, and was re-elected on four occasions.

Wirstad was born in Lunner and was mayor of Lunner municipality in the period 1947–1951.

Political offices
Preceded by	Chair of the Standing Committee on Transport; 1956–1958	Succeeded by Lars Elisæus Vatnaland
Preceded by Lars Elisæus Vatnaland	Chair of the Standing Committee on Transport; 1961–1965	Succeeded by Nils Kristen Jacobsen
