= Arve Berg =

Norwegian politician (born 1935)

Member of Storting
- In office 1973–1989
- Prime Minister: Trygve Bratteli (Labour, 1973–1976); Odvar Nordli (Labour, 1976–1981); Gro Harlem Brundtland (Labour, 1981–1981); Kåre Willoch (Conservative, 1981–1986); Gro Harlem Brundtland (Labour, 1986–1989)
- Constituency: Møre og Romsdal

Personal details
- Born: May 1, 1935 (age 90) Skodje Municipality, Norway
- Party: Labour Party

Arve Berg (born 1 May 1935, in Skodje Municipality) is a Norwegian politician for the Labour Party.

He was elected to the Norwegian Parliament from Møre og Romsdal in 1973, and was re-elected on three occasions, serving until 1989.

On the local level he was a member of the municipal council from Ålesund Municipality from 1963 to 1975. From 1971 to 1975, he was also a deputy member of Møre og Romsdal county council. He chaired the local party chapter from 1966 to 1968.
