= Johan Martin Jakobsen Strand =

Norwegian politician

Member of Parliament
- In office 1925–1935†

Personal details
- Born: 10 October 1873 Kvernes Municipality
- Died: 17 August 1935 (aged 61)
- Party: Liberal

Johan Martin Jakobsen Strand (10 October 1873 – 17 August 1935) was a Norwegian farmer and politician for the Liberal Party.

== Career ==
He was born in Kvernes Municipality as a son of farmer Jacob Jakobsen Strand (1835–1875) and his wife Ellen Johanne Larsdatter (1841–1930). He took his education at the Higher College of Agriculture at Aas from 1899 to 1901. He ran an agricultural school from 1903 to 1911, and was county agronomist in Møre from 1906 to 1907. In 1907 the school was relocated to Bremsnes Municipality, and Strand moved here in 1908. He was a member of the municipal council of Bremsnes Municipality from 1916 to 1934, serving as deputy mayor between 1919 and 1928. He was also the director of the local savings bank. From 1930 to 1935 he was a board member of the Bank of Norway branch in Kristiansund.

He was elected to the Norwegian Parliament from the constituency Møre on four occasions; in 1924, 1927, 1930 and 1933. As he died before the fourth term ended, he was replaced by deputy Ole Nikolai Ingebrigtson Strømme. Strand was also a member of the Tax Law Commission of 1929 together with Johan Henrik Christiansen, Sverre Sivertsen, Nils Hjelmtveit, Gabriel Moseid and Finn Blakstad.
