= Joakim Myklebost Tangen =

Norwegian politician (born 2002)

Member of the Storting
- Incumbent
- Assumed office 1 October 2025
- Constituency: Møre og Romsdal

Personal details
- Born: 28 March 2002 (age 24)
- Party: Progress Party

Joakim Myklebost Tangen (born 28 March 2002) is a Norwegian politician who was elected member of the Storting in 2025. He is the chairman of the Progress Party's Youth in Møre og Romsdal.
