= Mary Eide =

Norwegian politician

Mary Eide (19 April 1924 – 18 July 2013) was a Norwegian politician for the Labour Party. She served as an MP from 1977 to 1989.

== Career ==
She was a daughter of engineer Peder Adolf Fosnæs (1881–1952) and housewife Elise Marie Larsen (1886–1943). After finishing lower secondary school in Tønsberg she briefly studied domestic science, and spent her pre-legislative career as a housewife.

She was an elected member of the municipal council of Molde Municipality from 1967 to 1978, the last three years in the executive committee. She was elected to the Parliament of Norway from Møre og Romsdal in 1977, and was re-elected on two occasions in 1981 and 1985. She spent all her three terms in the Standing Committee on Sea Transport and Fisheries, and was also a member of the Labour Party's fisheries committee during that time.

In addition to various municipal boards and her local congregational council in Molde, she was a board member of Molde Hospital from 1967 to 1977 and Molde Nursing Home from 1972 to 1978. She was a member of Vinmonopolet's council from 1972 to 1980. She died in July 2013.
