= Bjarne Flem =

Norwegian politician (1914–1999)

Bjarne Flem (30 September 1914 – 8 December 1999) was a Norwegian politician for the Liberal Party.

He was born in Haram Municipality.

He was elected to the Norwegian Parliament from Møre og Romsdal in 1965, and was re-elected on one occasion. He had previously served as a deputy representative during the term 1961–1965 and also served in this position from 1973–1977.

Flem was involved in local politics in Haram Municipality from 1947 to 1951 and 1963 to 1966. He chaired the local party chapter from 1973 to 1976 and 1979 to 1980, and the county chapter from 1974 to 1976.

Outside politics he worked as a fisherman.
