= Ola Johan Gjengedal =

Norwegian politician

Ola Johan Gjengedal (14 February 1900 – 15 May 1992) was a Norwegian politician for the Christian Democratic Party.

He was born in Gloppen Municipality.

He was elected to the Norwegian Parliament from Møre og Romsdal in 1965, and was re-elected on three occasions. He had previously served in the position of deputy representative during five terms from 1945 to 1965.

Gjengedal was involved in local politics in Ørsta Municipality before and after World War II.
