= Marianne Synnes =

Norwegian politician

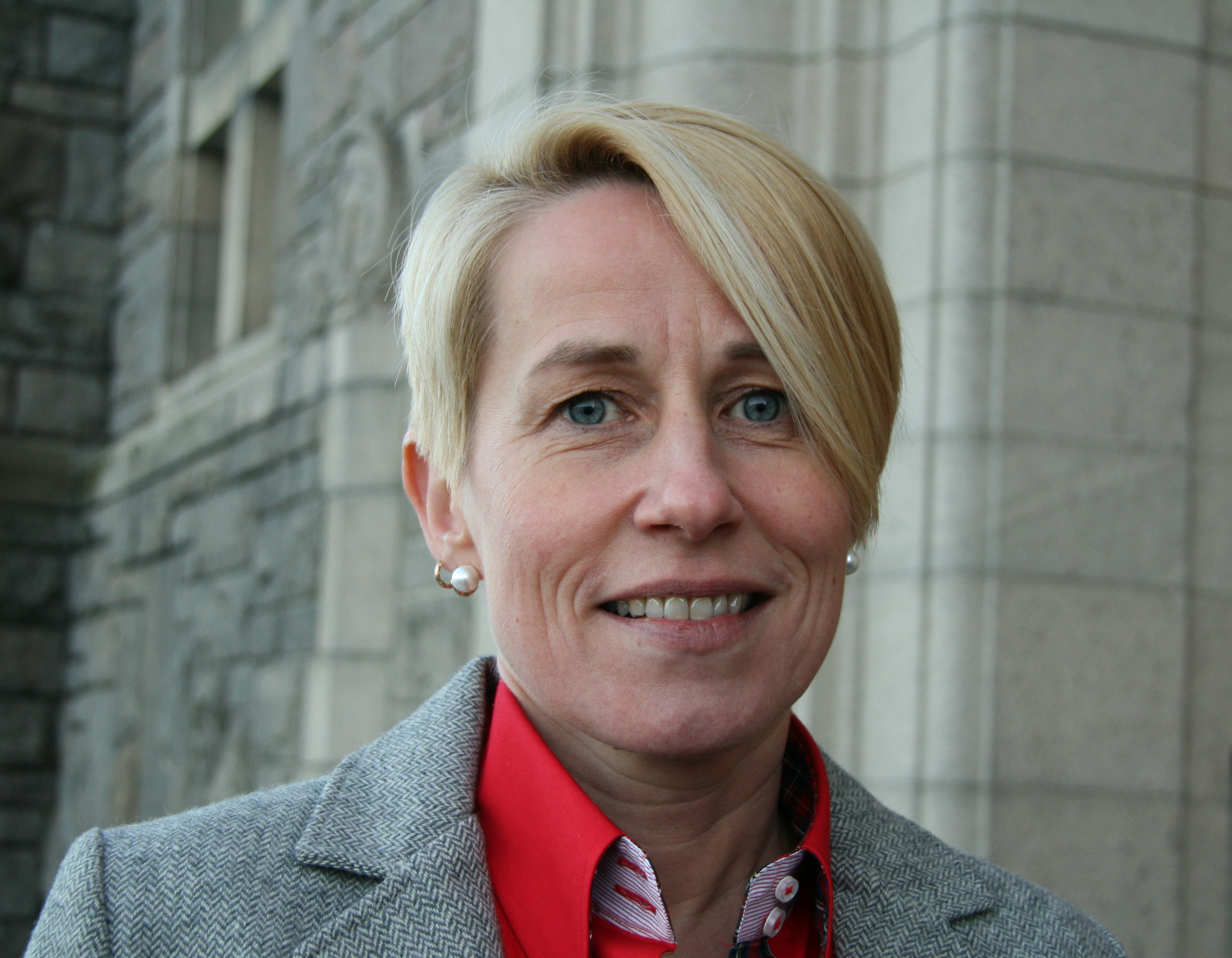
- Synnes in 2015
- Born: 5 June 1970 (age 56); Vigra, Norway
- Occupation: Politician
- Political party: Conservative Party

Marianne Synnes (born 5 June 1970) is a Norwegian medical laboratory scientist, molecular biologist and politician.

== Political career ==
Synnes was elected representative to the Storting for the period 2017–2021 for the Conservative Party, from the constituency of Møre og Romsdal.
