= Anders Talleraas =

Norwegian politician

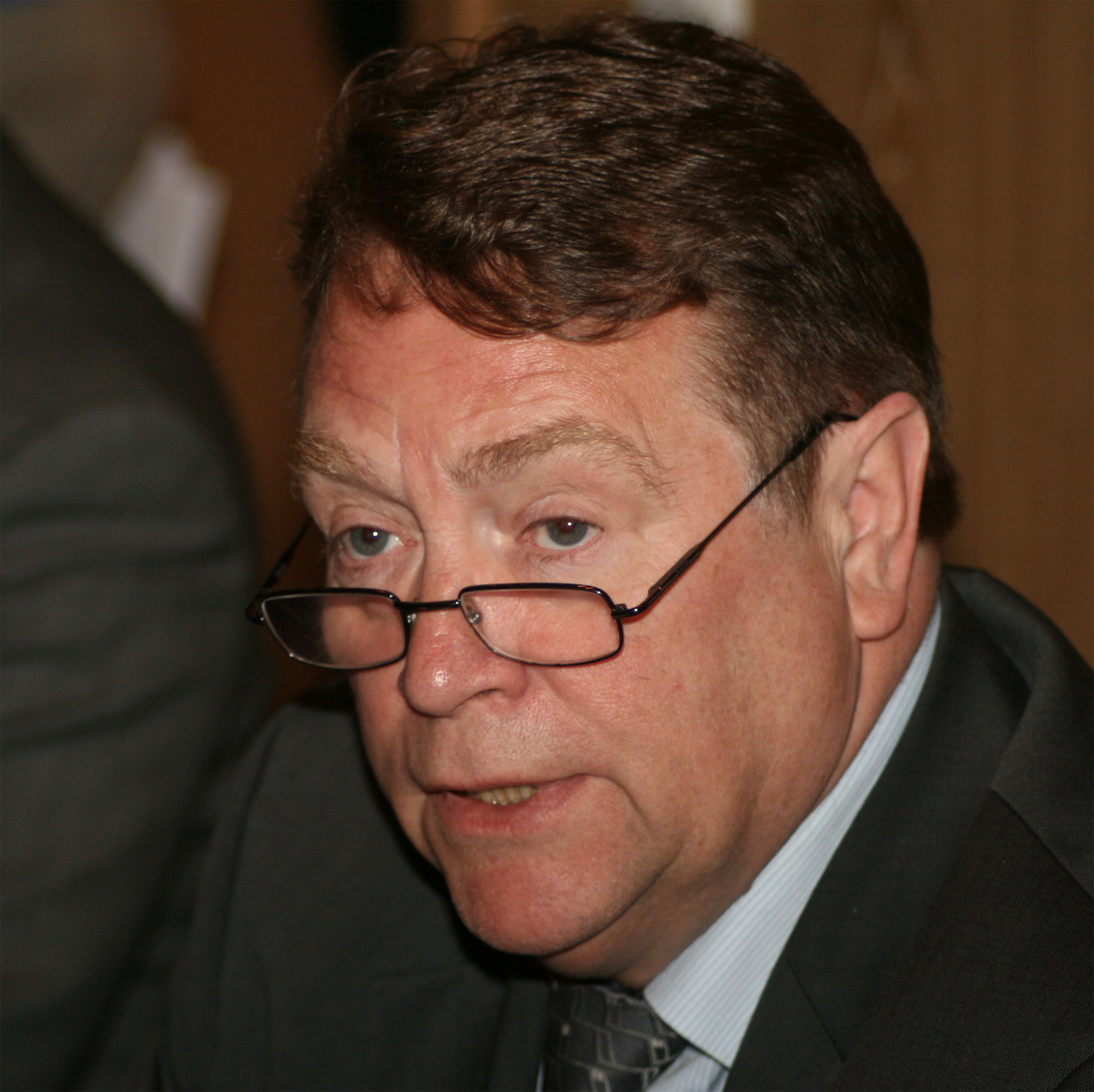
Anders Talleraas in May2009

Anders Talleraas (born 4 February 1946 in Brattvær Municipality) is a Norwegian politician for the Conservative Party.

He was elected to the Norwegian Parliament from Møre og Romsdal in 1977, and was re-elected on four occasions.

Talleraas was a member of the executive committee of the municipal council of Molde Municipality between 1975 and 1978. From 1998 he sat on the board of Romsdals Fellesbank, and was Chairman of Avinor from 2002 to 2006.

In 2012, Borgarting Court of Appeal found Talleraas guilty of through grave negligence unrightfully having received 2.6 million kr in pension from the Norwegian Parliament. He got a 6-month suspended sentence. The Supreme Court of Norway declined to hear his appeal in 2013.
