= Rikard Olsvik =

Norwegian politician

Rikard Olsvik (6 February 1930 in Aure Municipality – 21 August 2017) was a Norwegian politician for the Labour Party.

== Personal life ==
Rikard was the son of Hans Olsvik (1897-1974) and Anna Rosvoll (1897-1977).

== Career history ==
He was elected to the Norwegian Parliament from Møre og Romsdal in 1981, and was re-elected on two occasions.

Olsvik was involved in local politics in Tustna Municipality and Rindal Municipality, serving as mayor of Rindal Municipality from 1971 to 1973. He was also a member of Møre og Romsdal county council during the terms 1975–1979 and 1979–1983.

== Death ==
He died on 21 August 2017 at the age of 87.
