= Sverre Bernhard Nybø =

Norwegian politician (1903–1976)

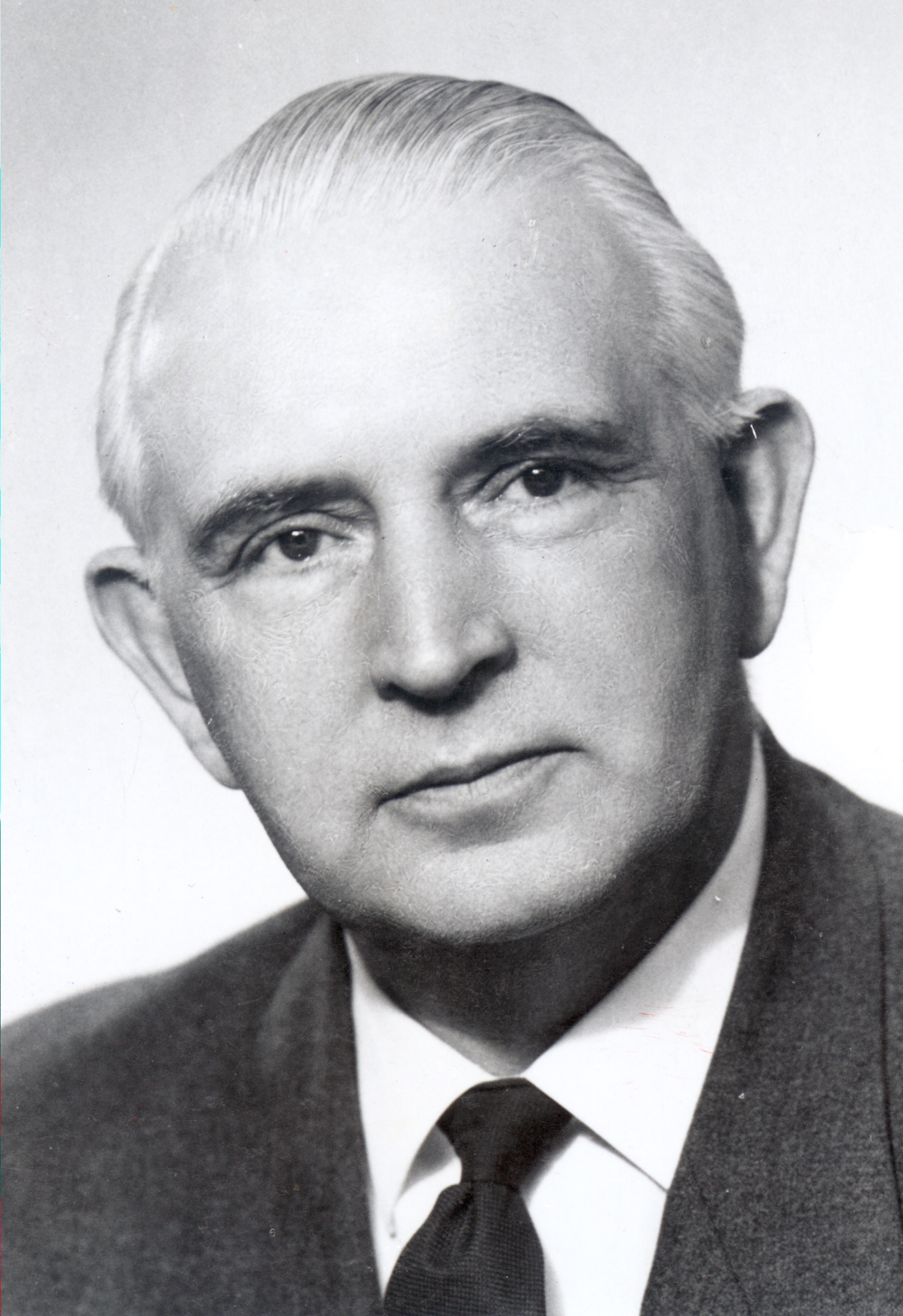
Sverre Bernhard Nybø

Sverre Bernhard Nybø (24 November 1903 in Oslo – 4 September 1976) was a Norwegian politician for the Conservative Party.

He was elected to the Norwegian Parliament from Møre og Romsdal in 1954, and was re-elected on four occasions.

Nybø was mayor of Vanylven Municipality in 1945 and 1959–1961, and deputy mayor in 1947–1950.
