= Helge Orten =

Norwegian politician (born 1966)

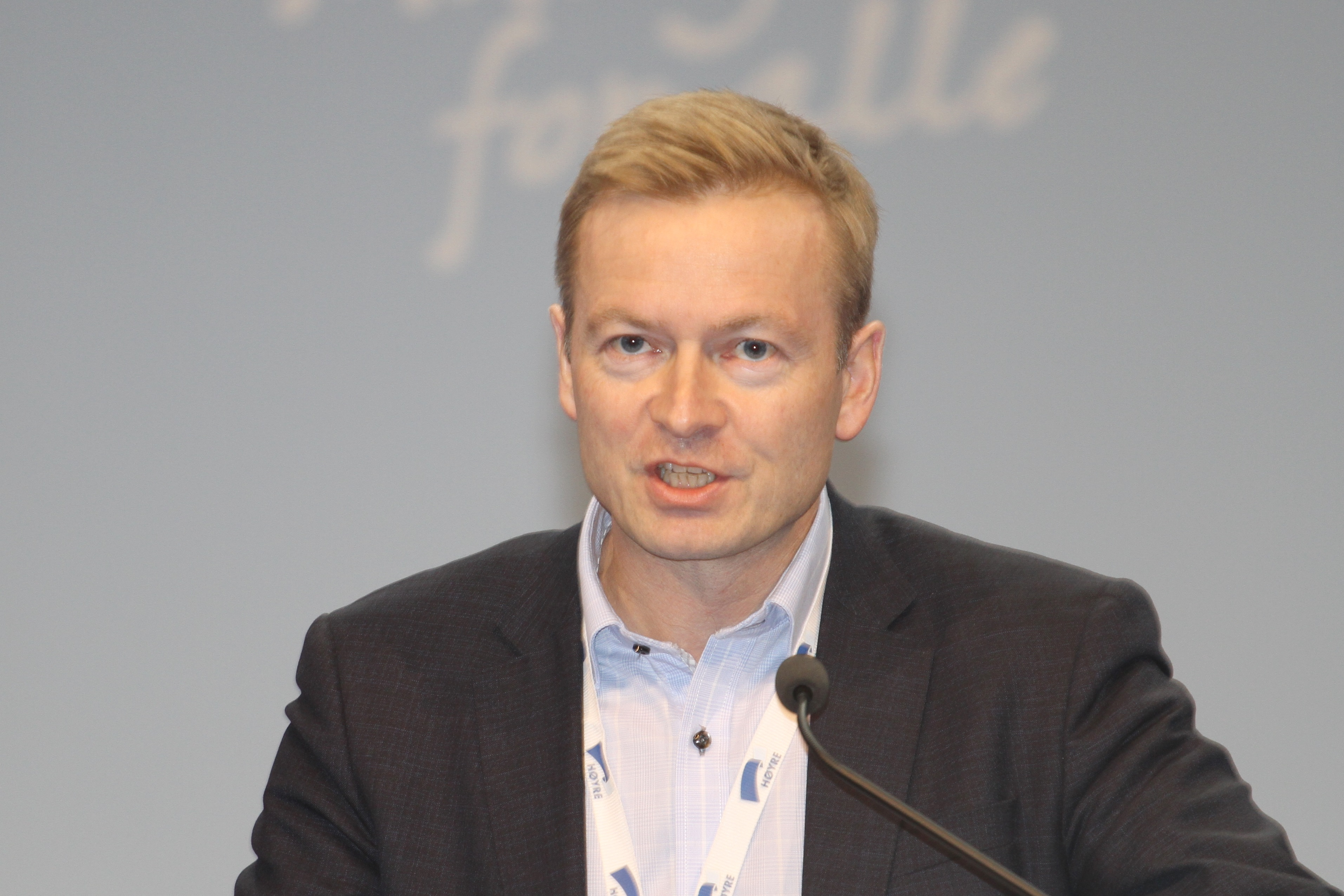
- Helge Orten in 2017

Chair of the Standing Committee on Transport and Communications
- In office 18 October 2017 – 30 September 2021
- Preceded by: Nikolai Astrup (H)
- Succeeded by: Erling Sande (Sp)

Member of the Storting
- In office 1 October 2013 – 30 September 2025
- Constituency: Møre og Romsdal

Personal details
- Born: 25 October 1966 (age 59) Midsund Municipality, Norway
- Party: Conservative
- Occupation: Politician

Helge Orten (born 25 October 1966) is a Norwegian politician for the Conservative Party.

He was elected to the Storting from Møre og Romsdal in 2013 where he was a member of the Standing Committee on Transport and Communications from 2013 to 2017 and chair of the same committee from 2017 to 2021. He was a member of the Standing Committee on Finance and Economic Affairs from 2021 to 2025.

He was re-elected to the Storting in 2017 and 2021, but did not seek re-election in 2025.
