= Ola Langset =

Norwegian schoolteacher and politician

- Born: 24 February 1920; Straumsnes, Norway
- Died: 31 July 1991 (aged 71)
- Occupations: Schoolteacher; Politician

Ola Langset (24 February 1920 – 31 July 1991) was a Norwegian schoolteacher and politician.

He was born in Straumsnes to Edvard Langset and Marta Lyngstad. He was elected representative to the Storting for the period 1973–1977 for the Socialist Left Party.
