= Ivar Kornelius Eikrem =

Norwegian politician

Ivar Kornelius Eikrem (10 August 1898 – 18 October 1994) was a Norwegian politician for the Labour Party.

He was born in Akerø Municipality.

He was elected to the Norwegian Parliament from Møre og Romsdal in 1954, and re-elected on two occasions.

Eikrem served as mayor of Nord-Aukra Municipality from 1945 to 1947, as a regular council member from 1947 to 1951 and as deputy mayor from 1951 to 1959. He was also a member of Møre og Romsdal county council from 1945 to 1947. Eikrem chaired the local party chapter from 1931 to 1940 and again from 1945 to 1949.

Outside of politics, he worked as a farmer.
