= Rasmus Olsen Langeland =

Norwegian Minister of Labour

Rasmus Olsen Langeland (8 February 1873 – 1954) was the Norwegian Minister of Labour from 1931–1933. He was also a member of the Storting for Møre og Romsdal from 1922 to 1945.

He was father of Olav Rasmussen Langeland.
