= Frank Edvard Sve =

Norwegian politician (born 1968)

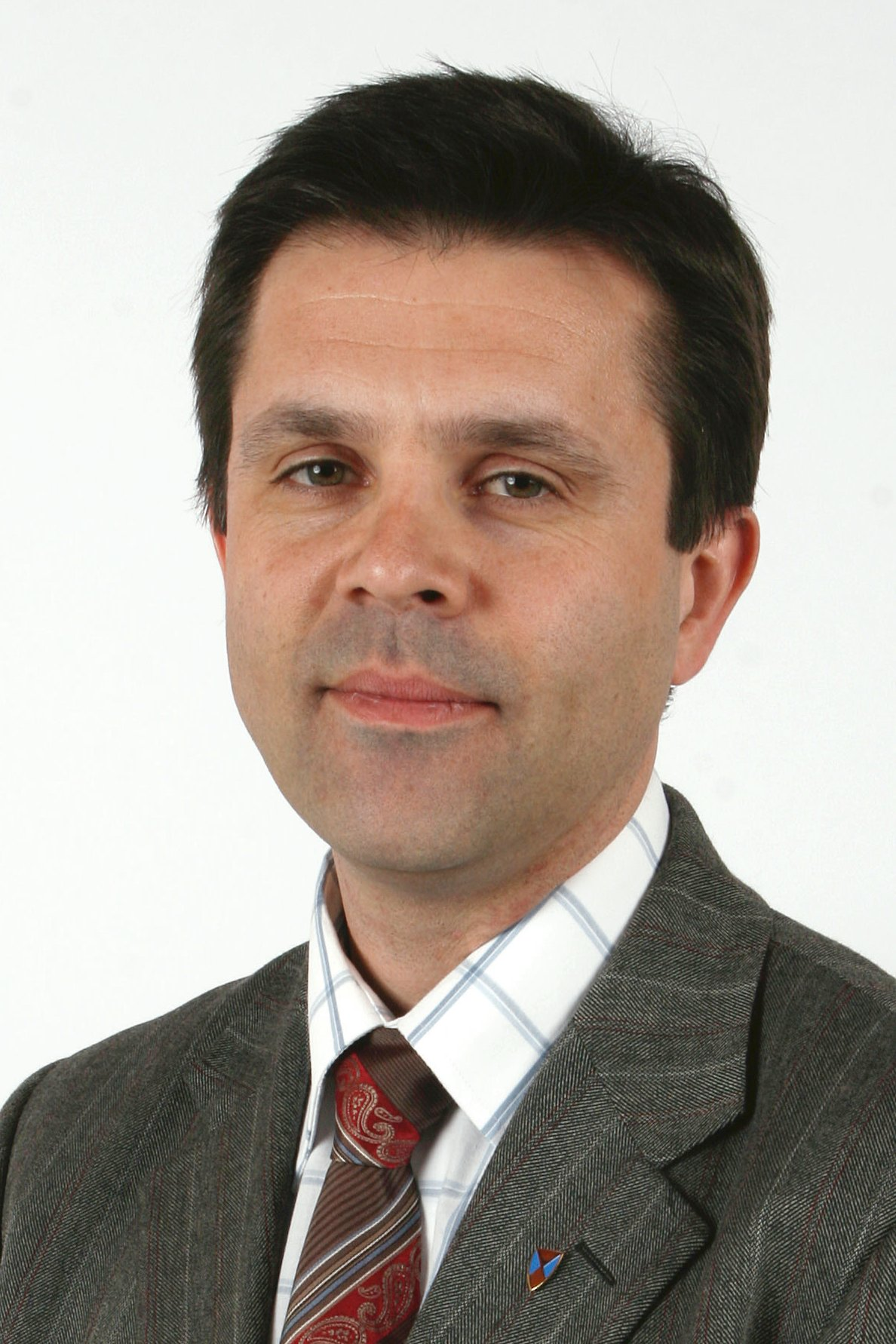

Member of the Storting
- Incumbent
- Assumed office 1 October 2021
- Constituency: Møre og Romsdal

Personal details
- Born: 18 February 1968 (age 58)
- Party: Progress
- Occupation: Politician

Frank Edvard Sve (born 18 February 1968) is a Norwegian politician.

He was elected representative to the Storting from the constituency of Møre og Romsdal in 2021, for the Progress Party. He got re-elected in 2025.

Trained as industrial carpenter, he worked in the furniture industry in Stranda Municipality from 1986 to 1999. A member of the municipal council of Stranda Municipality from 1999 to 2011, he was also mayor of Stranda Municipality from 2002 to 2011.

Sve has been member of the representative council of Norges Bank since 2014.
