= May-Helen Molvær Grimstad =

Norwegian politician (born 1968)

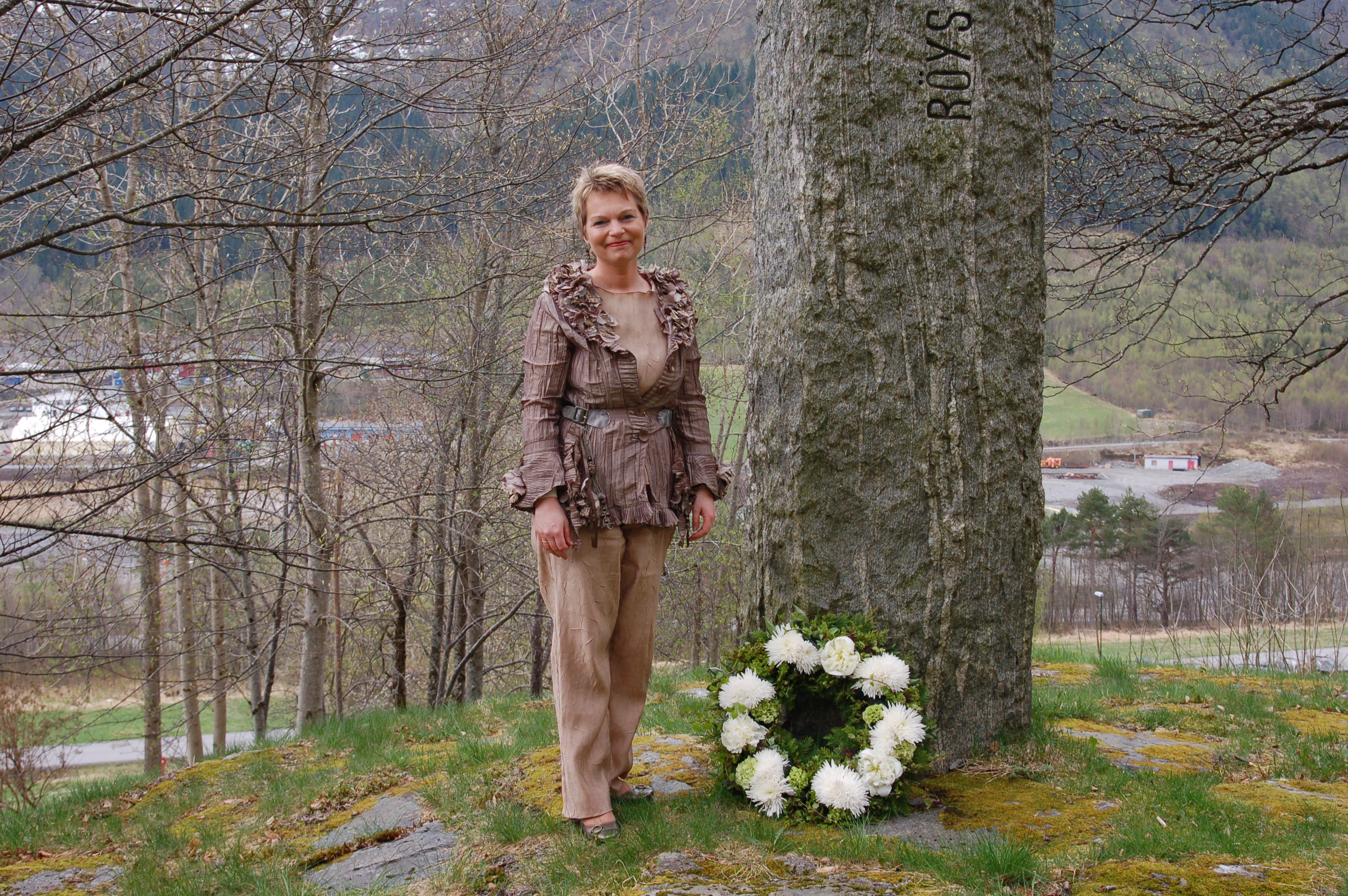

May-Helen Molvær Grimstad (born 31 January 1968 in Ålesund) is a Norwegian politician for the Christian Democratic Party.

She was elected to the Norwegian Parliament from Møre og Romsdal in 1993, and has been re-elected on three occasions.
