= Rigmor Andersen Eide =

Norwegian politician (born 1954)

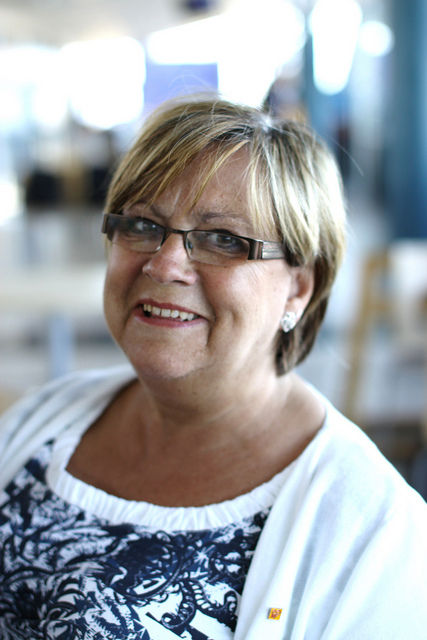

Rigmor Andersen Eide (born 26 June 1954) is a Norwegian politician for the Christian Democratic Party.

She was elected to the Parliament of Norway from Møre og Romsdal in 2009. She became a member of the Standing Committee on Business and Industry. Like her entire party group, she also joined Israels Venner på Stortinget. She had previously served as a deputy representative during the terms 2001–2005 and 2005–2009.
