= Ingvard Sverdrup =

Norwegian politician

Ingvard Sverdrup (24 September 1936 – 9 March 1997) was a Norwegian politician for the Conservative Party.

He was born in Kristiansund.

He was elected to the Norwegian Parliament from Møre og Romsdal in 1985, and was re-elected on one occasion. He had previously served in the position of deputy representative during the terms 1969–1973.

Sverdrup was a member of the executive committee of Kristiansund municipality council between 1963 and 1971. He was also the county mayor of Møre og Romsdal.
