= Hans Hammond Rossbach =

Norwegian politician

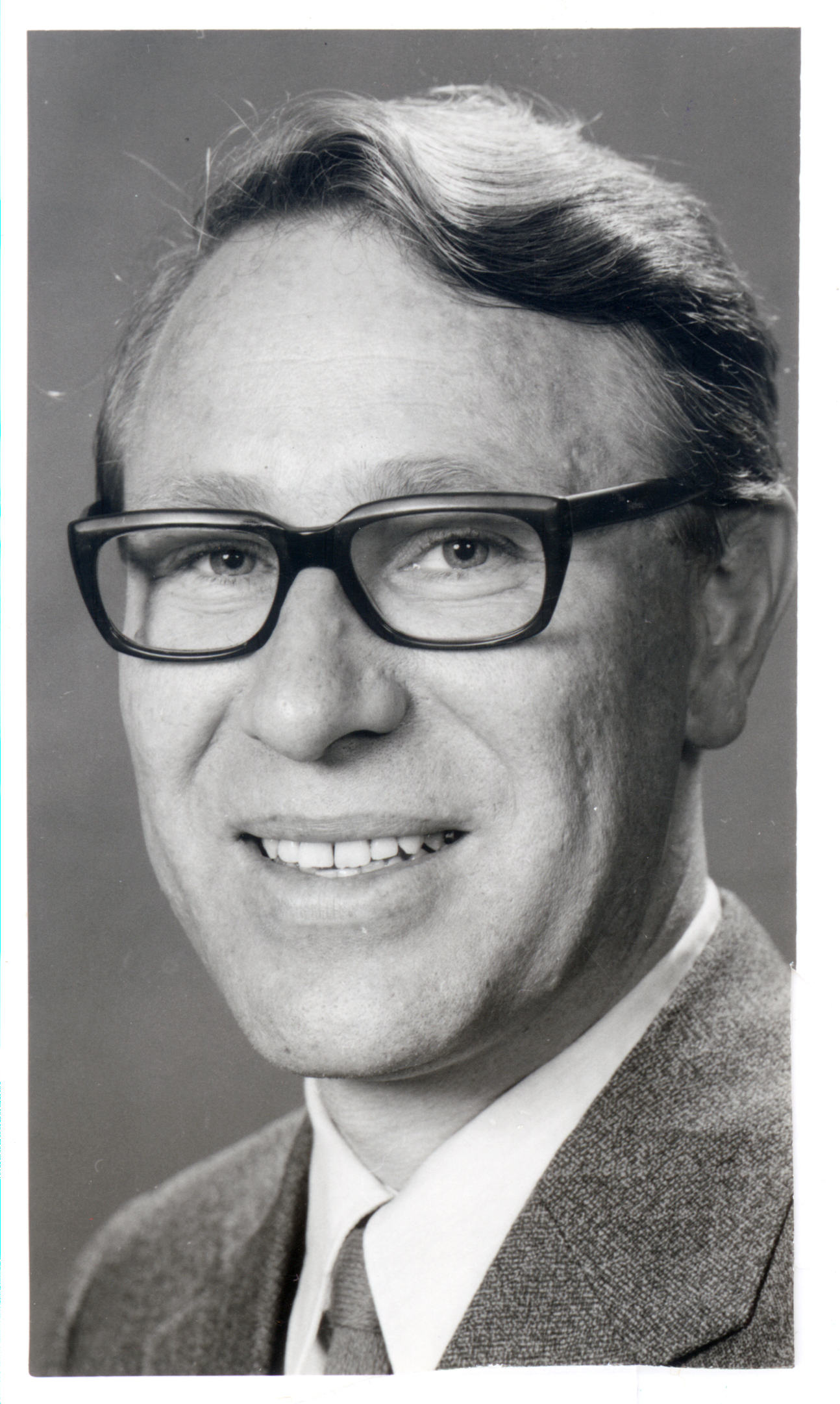
Hans Hammond

Hans Hammond Rossbach (16 October 1931 – 7 August 2012) was a Norwegian politician for the Liberal Party.

He was elected to the Norwegian Parliament from Møre og Romsdal in 1965, and was re-elected on four occasions.

Rossbach was involved in local politics in Kristiansund between 1963 and 1971, and was a member of Møre og Romsdal county council during the term 1963–1967.

Party political offices
Preceded by Eva Kolstad	Leader of the Liberal Party of Norway; 1976-1982	Succeeded by Odd Einar Dørum
