= Anders Vassbotn =

Norwegian farmer, writer and politician

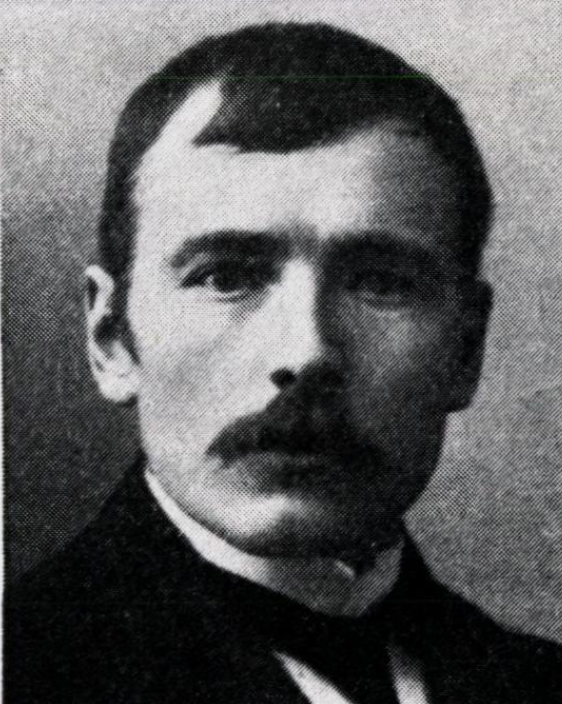
Anders Vassbotn (1868–1944), Norwegian farmer, poet and politician (Liberal party)

Anders Rasmusson Vassbotn (16 May 1868 – 30 August 1944) was a Norwegian farmer, writer and politician for the Liberal Party. He was the mayor of Volda Municipality from 1911 to 1913. He sat in the Parliament of Norway from 1913 to 1930, and was a member of the Norwegian Nobel Committee from 1939.
