= Knut Toven =

Norwegian politician

Knut Toven (11 March 1897 – 18 November 1980) was a Norwegian politician for the Christian Democratic Party.

He was elected to the Norwegian Parliament from Møre og Romsdal in 1950, and was re-elected on four occasions.

Toven was born in Nesset and mayor of Nesset municipality between 1928 and 1951.
