= Lars Sverkeson Romundstad =

Norwegian politician

Lars Sverkeson Romundstad (12 September 1885 – 30 June 1961) was a Norwegian politician for the Farmers' Party.

He was elected to the Parliament of Norway from Møre in 1928, and was re-elected on four occasions.

Romundstad was born in Straumsnes and a member of Straumsnes municipality council from 1919 to 1934, serving the terms 1922–1925, 1925–1928 and 1931–1934 as mayor.
