= Gudmund Restad =

Norwegian politician (1937–2021)

Minister of Finance
- In office 17 October 1997 – 17 March 2000
- Prime Minister: Kjell Magne Bondevik
- Preceded by: Jens Stoltenberg
- Succeeded by: Karl Eirik Schjøtt-Pedersen

Member of the Norwegian Parliament
- In office 1 October 1985 – 30 September 2001
- Constituency: Møre og Romsdal

Mayor of Smøla Municipality
- In office 1 January 1980 – 1 October 1985
- Preceded by: Roger Osen
- Succeeded by: Hans Vallestad

Personal details
- Born: Gudmund Olav Restad; 19 December 1937 Skaun Municipality, Sør-Trøndelag, Norway
- Died: 18 September 2021 (aged 83)
- Party: Centre

Gudmund Olav Restad (19 December 1937 – 18 September 2021) was a politician for the Norwegian Centre Party. He was Minister of Finance from 1997 to 2000. Prior to that, he served as Mayor of Smøla Municipality from 1980 to 1985 when he was elected to Parliament.
