= Einar Hareide (politician) =

Norwegian politician (1899–1983)

Einar Hareide (24 October 1899 – 7 April 1983) was a Norwegian politician for the Christian Democratic Party, being the party's leader from 1955 to 1967.

He was elected to the Norwegian Parliament from Møre og Romsdal in 1945, and was re-elected on four occasions.

Hareide was born in Ålesund and was a member of the municipal council for Hareid Municipality between 1931 and 1937.
