= 1973 in Norway =

- Centuries: 18th; 19th; 20th; 21st
- Decades: 1950s; 1960s; 1970s; 1980s; 1990s
- See also: List of years in Norway

Events in the year 1973 in Norway.

== Incumbents ==
- Monarch – Olav V.
- Prime Minister – Lars Korvald (Christian Democratic Party) until 16 October, Trygve Bratteli (Labour Party)

== Events ==
- 26 January – Nepal–Norway relations: Diplomatic relations between Nepal–Norway were established.
- 8 April – The Progress Party was founded.
- 21 July – Lillehammer affair: Israeli Mossad agents assassinate a Moroccan waiter in Lillehammer. He had been mistaken for Ali Hassan Salameh, one of the leaders of Black September, the Palestinian group responsible for the 1972's Munich Olympics Massacre, who had been given shelter in Norway. Six Mossad agents were arrested by the Norwegian authorities and the incident became known as the "Lillehammer affair".
- 10 September – The 1973 Parliamentary election takes place.
- 16 October – Bratteli's Second Cabinet was appointed.
- 22 November – 1973 oil crisis: The government approves the weekend closure of all petrol stations.
- 5 December – 1973 oil crisis: Driving ban for vehicles on weekends.

=== Sports ===
- 4 August – Kristen Fløgstad set a new Norwegian record in the long jump at Bislett stadion. The record stood until 2019.

=== Music ===
- The popular chart show Norsktoppen debuts on NRK Radio.
- Kirsti Sparboe and Erik Bye win the 1972 Spellemannprisen in the female and male vocalist categories respectively. Popol Vuh, Philharmonic Company Orchestra, Birgitte Grimstad, Einar Schanke, Egil Monn-Iversen, Bør Børson Jr. and Sigurd Jansen also receive the award. Knutsen & Ludvigsen win in the category "Music for children" and Jens Book-Jenssen win the Special Award.

=== Literature ===
- Aasmund Brynildsen, essayist, biographer and magazine editor, is awarded the Riksmål Society Literature Prize

== Notable births ==
=== January – March ===
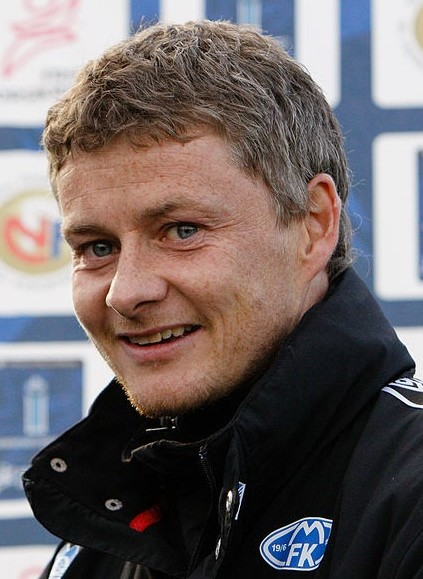
Ole Gunnar Solskjær

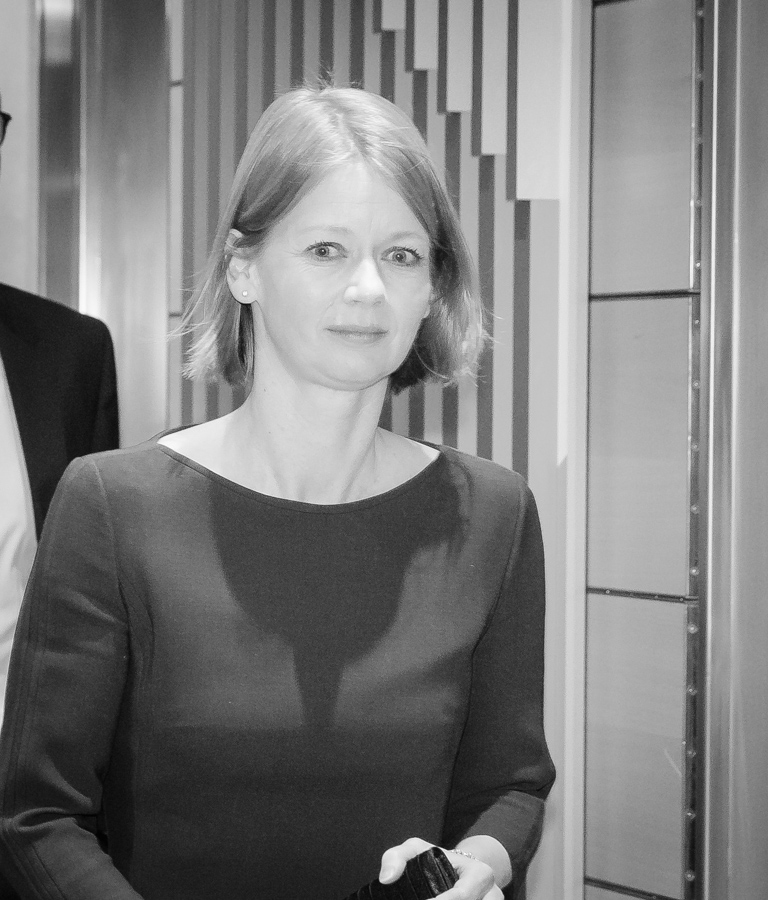
Ida Wolden Bache

- 1 January – Jon-Ivar Nygård, politician.
- 4 January – Øyvind Holen, journalist, comics creator.
- 8 January – Henning Solberg, rally and rallycross driver.
- 13 January – Helga Pedersen, politician.
- 24 January – Frode Hansen, journalist and editor.
- 29 January – Lena Jensen, politician.
- 30 January – Cecilie Mosli, actress, director.
- 3 February – Heidi Nordby Lunde, politician.
- 12 February – Celina Midelfart, businesswoman and investor.
- 16 February – Lene Barlie, sport wrestler.
- 26 February – Ole Gunnar Solskjær, footballer.
- 26 February – Ida Wolden Bache, economist.
- 5 March – Eva Kristin Hansen, politician.
- 23 March – Henriette Westhrin, politician.
- 26 March – Bård Hoksrud, politician.
- 27 March – Kim Hiorthøy, illustrator, writer, musician.

=== April – June ===
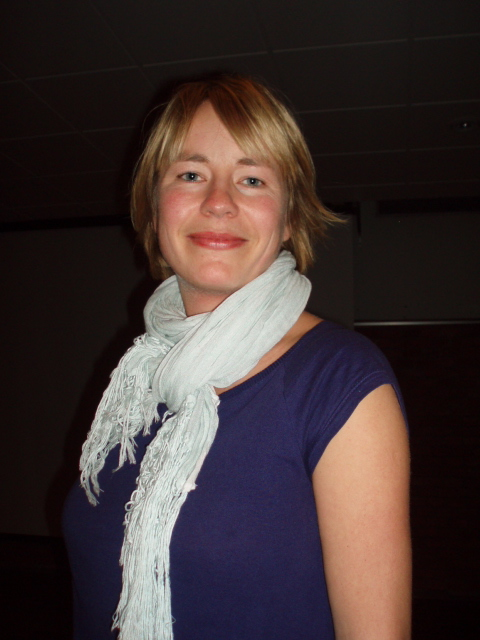
Trude Marstein

- 5 April – Andreas Viestad, food columnist.
- 12 April – Linda Monsen Merkesdal, politician.
- 18 April – Trude Marstein, author.
- 22 April – Espen Eckbo, comedian, actor.
- 30 April – Øystein Carlsen, speed skater.
- 3 May – Per Vidar Kjølmoen, politician.
- 6 May – André Øvredal, film director and screenwriter.
- 24 May – Hallgeir Pedersen, jazz guitarist.
- 27 May – Pål Kårbø, politician.
- 28 May – Aslak Sira Myhre, culture administrator.
- 14 June – Hege Kvitsand, handball player.
- 15 June – Frode Elsness, chess player.
- 15 June – Tore André Flo, footballer.
- 23 June – Henning Kraggerud, violinist.
- 29 June – Solveig Vestenfor, politician.
- 30 June – Ulf Leirstein, politician.
- 30 June – Hege Anett Pettersson, handball player (née Hege Johansen).

=== July – September ===
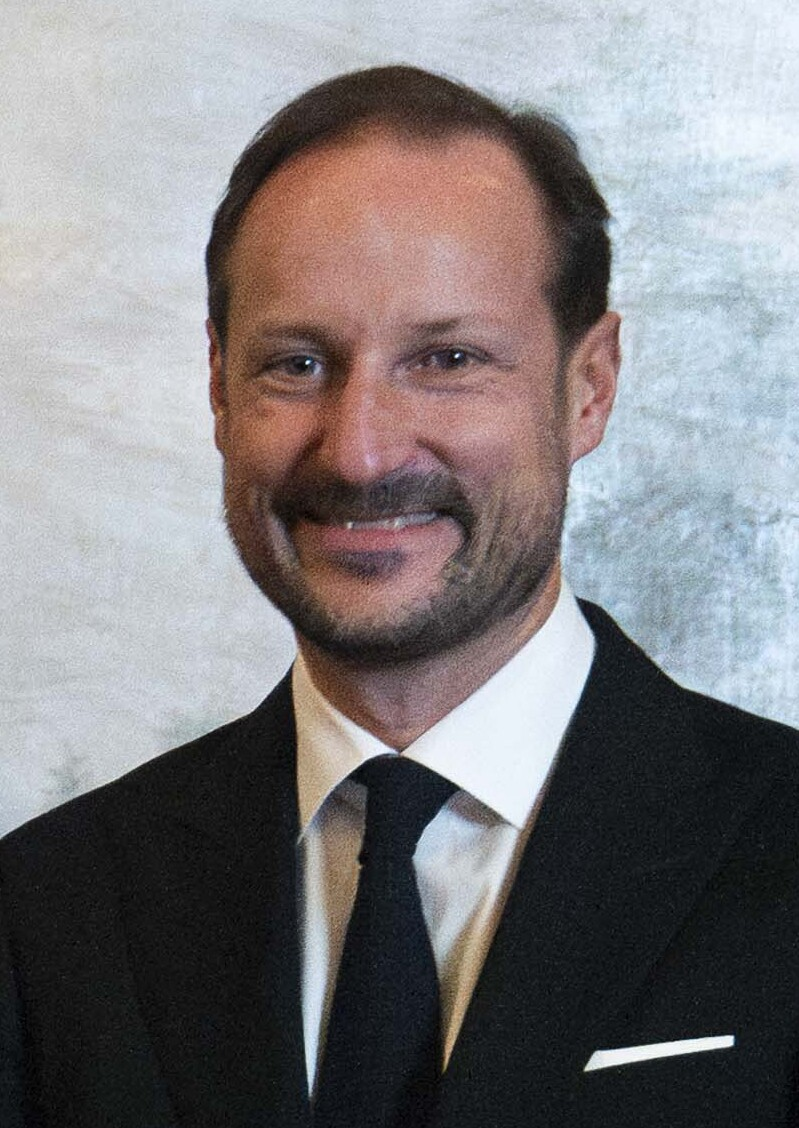
Haakon, Crown Prince of Norway

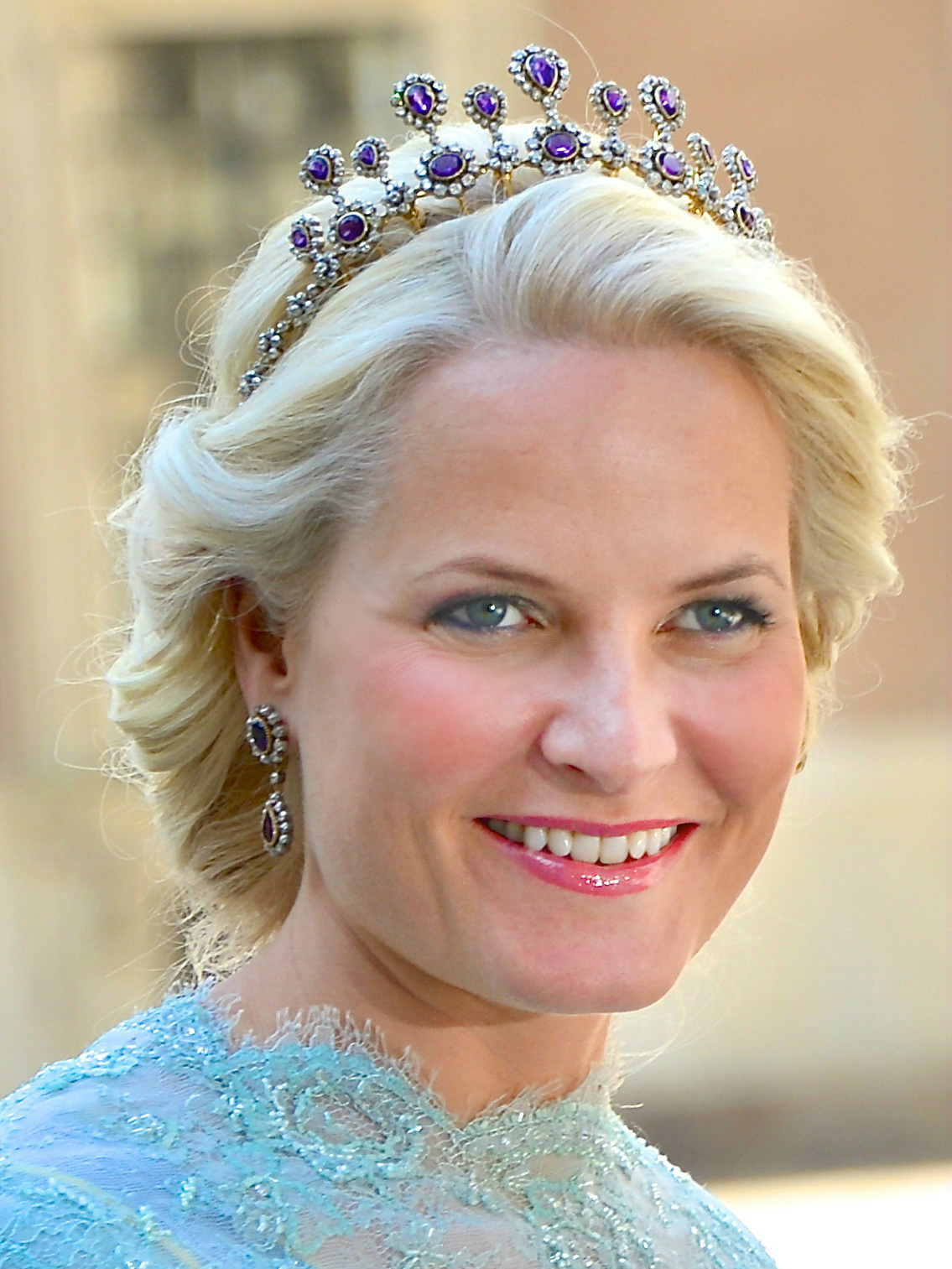
Mette-Marit, Crown Princess of Norway

- 8 July – Magne Thormodsæter, jazz musician.
- 19 July – Christian Berge, handball player and coach.
- 19 July – Andrea Bræin Hovig, actress.
- 20 July – Crown Prince Haakon, Royal Crown Prince of Norway.
- 30 July – Anette Carnarius Elseth, politician.
- 5 August – Henriette Viker, footballer.
- 11 August – Harald Rønneberg, television personality.
- 12 August – Alf Erik Andersen, politician.
- 16 August – Else-May Botten, or Else-May Norderhus, politician.
- 19 August – Crown Princess Mette-Marit, Crown Princess of Norway.
- 25 August – Roar Uthaug, film director.
- 5 September – Heidi Tjugum, handball player.
- 7 September – Eivind Buene, composer.
- 12 September – Hans Olav Lahlum, historian.
- 17 September – Mona Nilsen, politician.
- 17 September – Petter Rudi, footballer.
- 23 September – Elisabeth Lund Engebretsen, anthropologist.

=== October – December ===
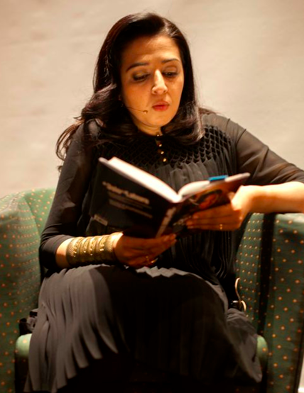
Mahmona Khan

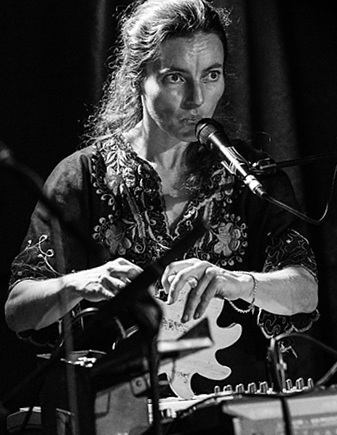
Maja S. K. Ratkje

- 2 October – Lene Nystrøm, singer-songwriter.
- 3 October – Kari Rueslåtten, soprano singer.
- 16 October – Mahmona Khan, journalist and writer.
- 16 October – Thomas Myhre, football manager and former professional footballer.
- 24 October – Laila Gustavsen, politician.
- 27 October – Lill Harriet Sandaune, politician.
- 3 November – Caroline Gedde-Dahl, alpine skier.
- 3 November – Eivind Austad, jazz pianist.
- 12 November – Egil Gjelland, biathlete.
- 20 November – Matias Faldbakken, visual artist, writer.
- 21 November – Thomas Enger, writer, journalist.
- 28 December – Herborg Kråkevik, singer, actress.
- 29 December – Maja S. K. Ratkje, composer.

=== Full date missing ===
- Gry-Anette Rekanes Amundsen, politician
- Kari Anne Bøkestad Andreassen, politician
- Eirik Langeland Fjeld, politician
- Lotte Grepp Knutsen, politician
- Anne Sandum, politician

== Notable deaths ==
=== January – June ===
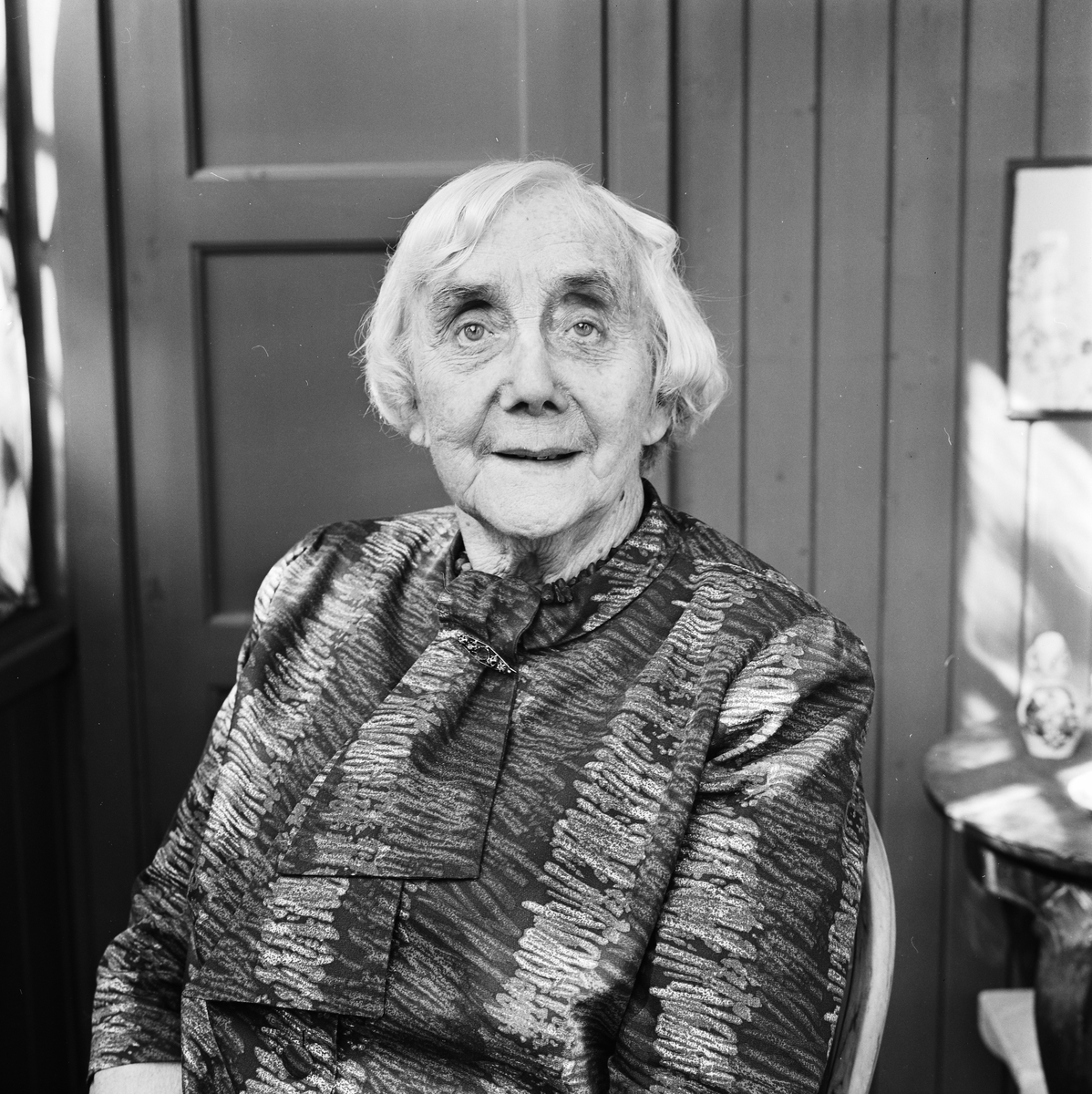
Henny Skjønberg

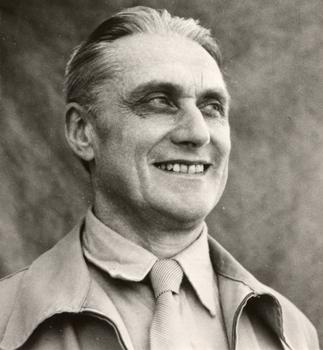
Ragnar Frisch

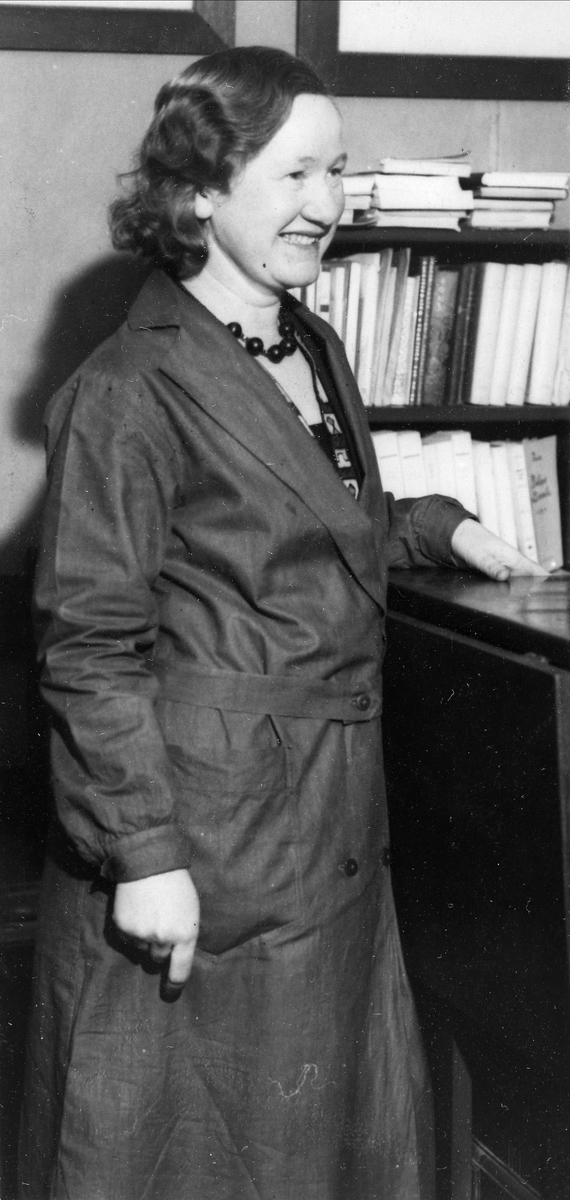
Rikka Deinboll

- 5 January – Henny Skjønberg, actress and stage director (born 1886).
- 24 January – Ivar Asbjørn Følling, physician (born 1888)
- 25 January – Kjeld Langeland, politician (born 1920)
- 25 January – Wilhelm Ljunggren, mathematician (born 1905).
- 25 January – Lars Nordrum, actor (born 1921)
- 31 January – Ragnar Anton Kittil Frisch, economist and Nobel Prize laureate (born 1895).
- 18 February – Rikka Deinboll, librarian (born 1897).
- 31 March – Søren Hans Smith Sørensen, ship-owner and politician (born 1885)
- 7 April – Kristian Gleditsch, geodesist (born 1901)
- 13 April – Ola Olsen, politician (born 1891)
- 19 April – Johan Badendyck, long-distance runner (born 1902)
- 21 April – Johan Jentoft Johansen, politician (born 1906)
- 30 April
  - Torgeir Andreas Berge, politician (born 1897)
  - Ivar Kristiansen Hognestad, politician (born 1888)
- 30 May – Jørgen Andersen, gymnast and Olympic silver medallist (born 1886)
- 4 June – Emil Løvlien, forest worker, trade unionist and politician (born 1899).
- 10 June – Leif Næss, rower and Olympic bronze medallist (born 1923).
- 11 June – Claes Gill, author, poet and actor (born 1910)
- 12 June – Tore Holthe, rear admiral (born 1914)
- 19 June – Sylvia Salvesen, resistance pioneer (born 1890)
- 27 June – Odd Nansen, architect, author and humanitarian (born 1901)
- 30 June – Peter Kjeldseth Moe, politician (born 1909)

=== July – December ===
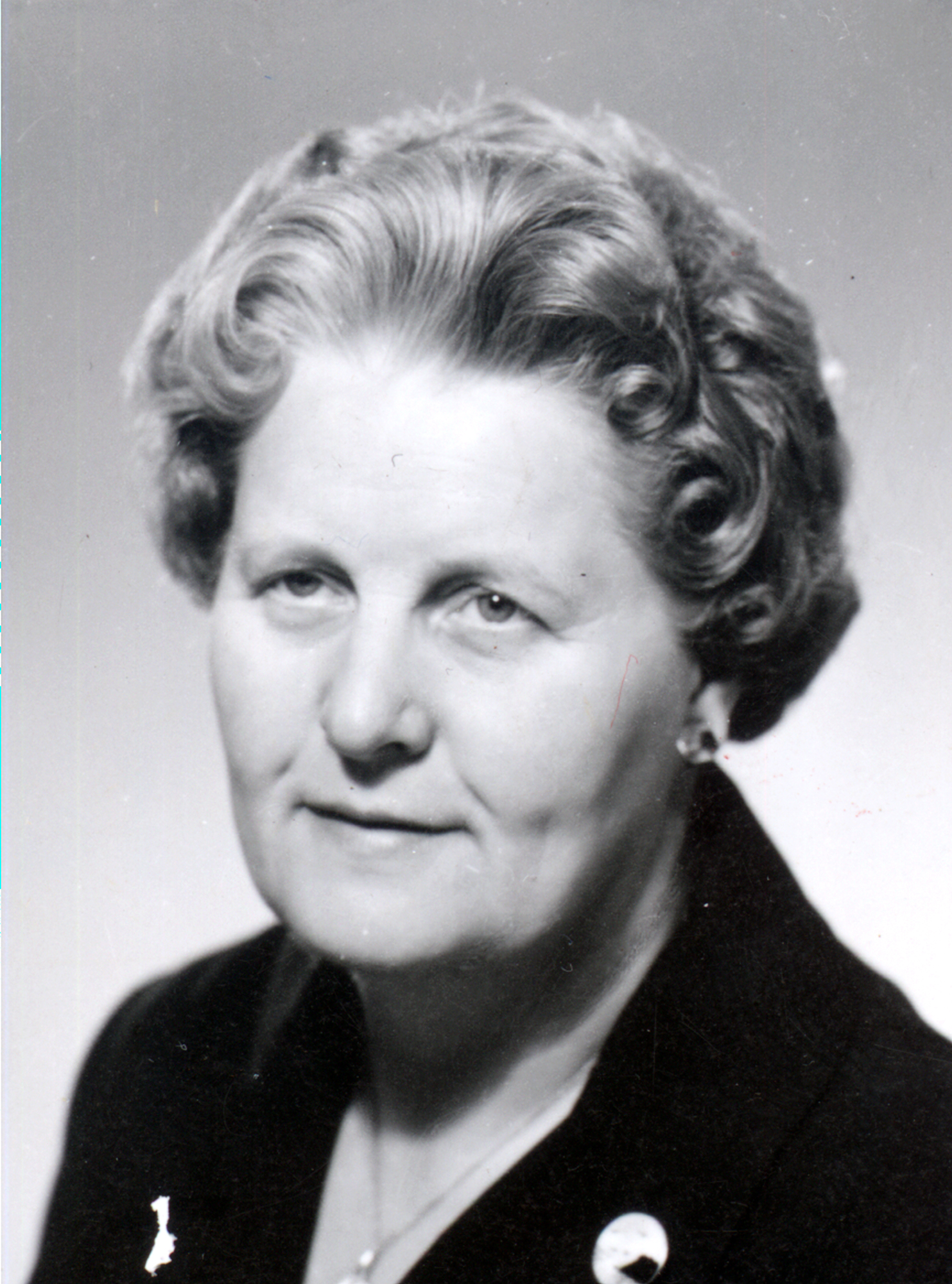
Martha Frederikke Johannessen

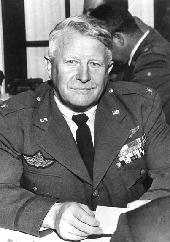
Bernt Balchen

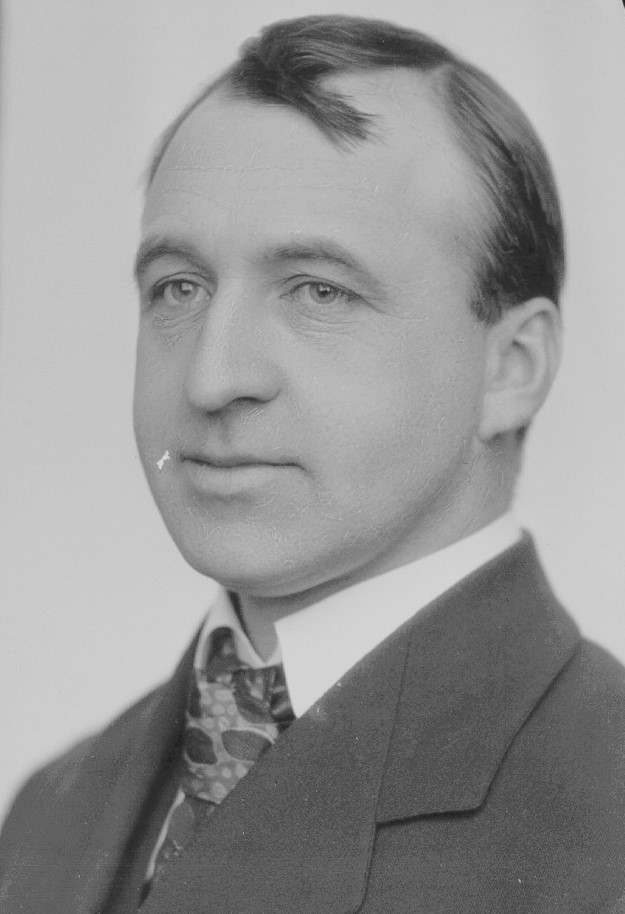
Olav Bergersen

- 3 July – Tor Gjesdal, journalist and civil servant (born 1909).
- 8 August – Erling Lindahl, actor (born 1903)
- 8 August – Henrik Nielsen, gymnast and Olympic silver medallist (born 1886)
- 4 September
  - Martha Frederikke Johannessen, politician (born 1907)
  - Elise Ottesen-Jensen, sex educator, journalist and anarchist agitator (born 1886)
- 14 September – Arne Sæter, politician (born 1913)
- 14 September – Ragnvald A. Tamber, naval officer (born 1913).
- 20 September – Arthur Qvist, horse rider and Olympic silver medallist (born 1896)
- 24 September – Johan Støa, politician (born 1913)
- 9 October – Astrid Tollefsen, poet (born 1897).
- 11 October – Hanna Jessen, sculptor (born 1907)
- 17 October – Bernt Balchen, polar and aviation pioneer in America (born 1899).
- 21 October
  - Conrad Carlsrud, gymnast, track and field athlete and Olympic silver medallist (born 1884)
  - Arnold Dyrdahl, bobsledder (born 1919)
- 28 October – Mikkjel Fønhus, writer (born 1894).
- 31 October – Finn Bjørnseth, writer (born 1924).
- 11 November – Carl E. Paulsen, sculptor (born 1896 or 1897)
- 12 November – Ole Colbjørnsen, journalist, economist, and Labour Party politician (born 1897)
- 1 December – Conrad Vogt-Svendsen, priest (born 1914).
- 10 December – Per Fokstad, teacher, politician and intellectual (born 1890)
- 17 December – Olav Bergersen, naval officer, war historian, politician (born 1880).
- 17 December – Toralv Kollin Markussen, politician (born 1895)
- 31 December – Eugen Johansen, horse rider and Olympic silver medallist (born 1892)

=== Full date unknown ===
- Ole Arntzen, businessperson and Milorg leader (b 1910)
- Nils Christoffer Bøckman, military officer and businessperson (born 1880)
