= Nøtterøy Municipality =

Former municipality in Vestfold, Norway

Nøtterøy Municipality Nøtterøy kommune
- Former municipality
- Nøtterø herred (historic name)
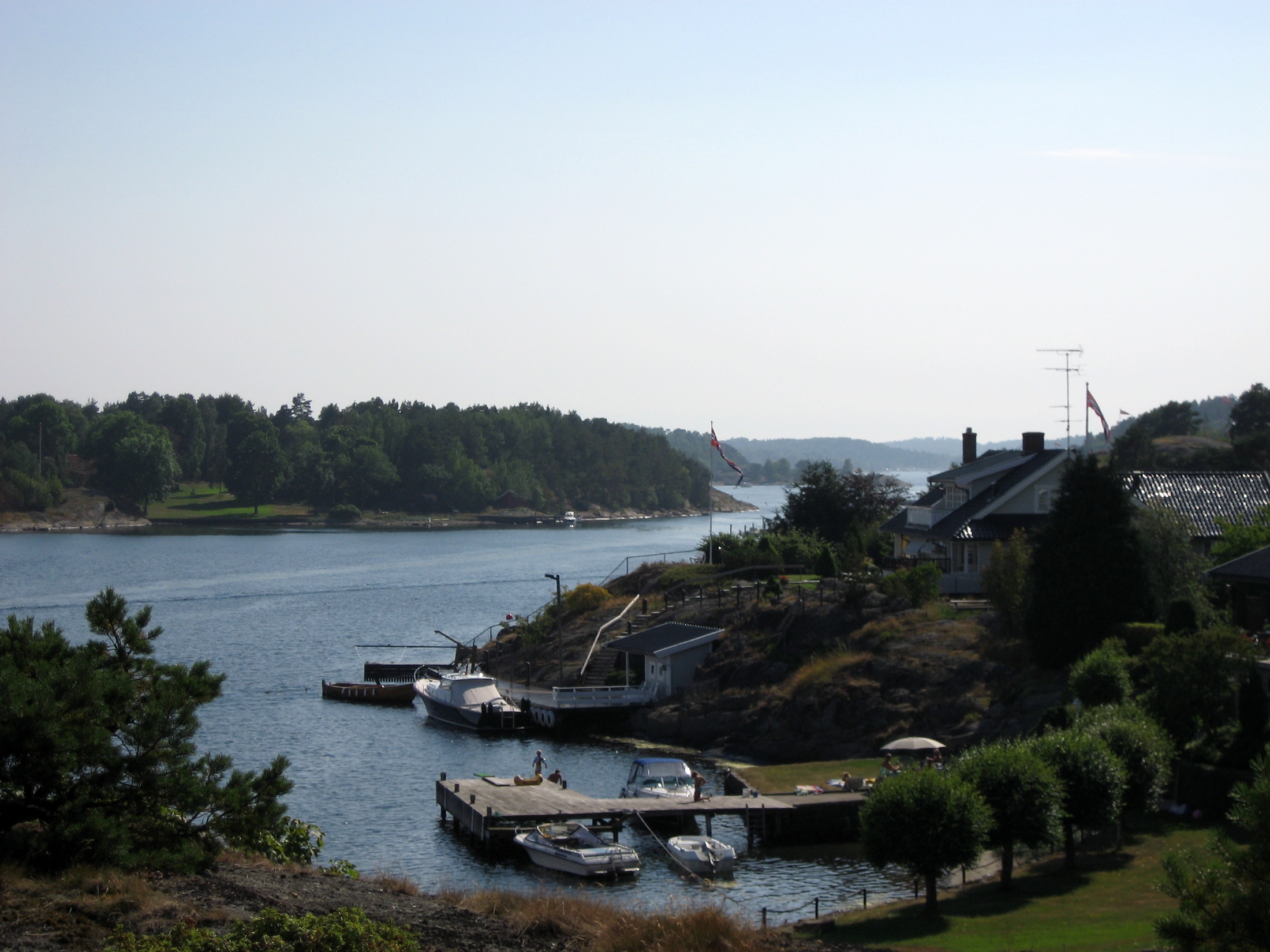
- View of the Årøysund area

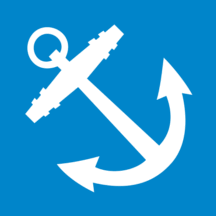
- Flag Coat of arms

- Vestfold within Norway

- Nøtterøy within Vestfold
- Coordinates: 59°12′4″N 10°24′28″E
- Country: Norway
- County: Vestfold
- Established: 1 Jan 1838
  - Created as: Formannskapsdistrikt
- Disestablished: 1 Jan 2018
  - Succeeded by: Færder Municipality
- Administrative centre: Borgheim

Government
  - Mayor (2007–2017): Roar Jonstang (H)

Area (upon dissolution)
  - Total: 60.56 km^{2} (23.38 sq mi)
  - Land: 60.43 km^{2} (23.33 sq mi)
  - Water: 0.13 km^{2} (0.050 sq mi) 0.2%
  - Rank: #410 in Norway
- Highest elevation (Vetan): 99.7 m (327 ft)

Population (2017)
  - Total: 21,748
  - Rank: #52 in Norway
  - Density: 359.9/km^{2} (932/sq mi)
  - Change (10 years): ▲ +7.1%
- Demonym: Nøttlending

Official language
  - Norwegian form: Bokmål
- Time zone: UTC+01:00 (CET)
  - Summer (DST): UTC+02:00 (CEST)
- ISO 3166 code: NO-0722

Nøtterøy (Norwegian pronunciation: [ˈnœtːərœʏ]; locally [ˈnœ̂tːərə]) is a former municipality in Vestfold county, Norway. The 60.56-square-kilometre (23.38 sq mi) municipality existed from 1838 until its dissolution in 2018. The area is now part of Færder Municipality. The administrative centre was the village of Borgheim. Other villages in Nøtterøy included Årøysund, Buerstad, Duken, Føynland, Glomstein, Hårkollen, Kjøpmannskjær, Nesbrygga, Oterbekk, Skallestad, Skjerve, Strengsdal, Tenvik, Torød, Vestskogen, and Vollen. The whole northern part of the municipality was considered to be part of the city of Tønsberg metropolitan area.

Prior to its dissolution in 2018, the 60.56-square-kilometre (23.38 sq mi) municipality was the 410th largest by area out of the 426 municipalities in Norway. Nøtterøy Municipality was the 52nd most populous municipality in Norway with a population of about 21,748. The municipality's population density was 359.9 inhabitants per square kilometre (932/sq mi) and its population had increased by 7.1% over the previous 10-year period.

The municipality was made up of nearly 200 islands, including the main island of Nøtterøy plus Veierland and Føynland.

== General information ==
=== Administrative history ===
The formannskapsdistrikt law of 1837 created a system of local government in Norway by establishing each town (ladested or kjøpstad) and each Church of Norway prestegjeld as a civil municipality. On 1 January 1838, Nøtterø prestegjeld was established as Nøtterø Municipality (later spelled Nøtterøy).

On 1 January 1877, an area on the north end of the island of Nøtterøy (population: 102) was transferred into Tønsberg Municipality. On 1 January 1901, the island of Håøya (population: 70) was transferred from Stokke Municipality to Nøtterøy Municipality. On 1 July 1915, an area of northern Nøtterøy (population: 12) was transferred to Sem Municipality.

During the 1960s, there were many municipal mergers across Norway due to the work of the Schei Committee. During the 1960s, there were many municipal mergers across Norway due to the work of the Schei Committee. On 1 January 1964, the island of Veierland (population: 165) was transferred from Stokke Municipality to Nøtterøy Municipality.

From 2017–2020, there were many municipal and county mergers across Norway due to the work of the Solberg cabinet. On 1 January 2018, Tjøme Municipality was dissolved and the following areas were merged to form the new Færder Municipality:

- all of Nøtterøy Municipality (population: 21,748)
- all of Tjøme Municipality (population: 4,928)

=== Name ===
The municipality is named after the old Nøtterøy prestegjeld. The prestegjeld was named after the island of Nøtterøy (Old Norse: Njótarøy) since the first Nøtterøy Church was built there. The first element is the verb njóta which means "to enjoy" or "to receive benefit from". The last element is øy which means "island".

Historically, the name of the municipality was spelled Nøtterø, using the Riksmal spelling. On 3 November 1917, a royal resolution changed the spelling of the name of the municipality to Nøtterøy. The letter y was added to the end of the word to "Norwegianize" the name (ø is the Danish word for "island" and øy is the Norwegian word).

=== Coat of arms ===
The coat of arms was granted on 24 October 1986. The official blazon is "Azure, an anchor argent in bend" (Norwegian: I blått et skråstilt sølv anker). This means the arms have a blue field (background) and the charge is an anchor that is displayed diagonally. The anchor has a tincture of argent which means it is commonly colored white, but if it is made out of metal, then silver is used. The blue color and the anchor were both chosen to emphasize the importance of fishing and sailing in this island municipality. The anchor was used as the municipal symbol since the 17th century. The arms were designed by Truls Nygaard. The municipal flag has the same design as the coat of arms.

=== Churches ===
The Church of Norway had three parishes (sokn) within Nøtterøy Municipality. It was part of the Tønsberg domprosti (deanery) in the Diocese of Tunsberg.

Churches in Nøtterøy Municipality
Parish (sokn)	Church name	Location of the church	Year built
Nøtterøy	Nøtterøy Church	Borgheim	c. 1100
Nøtterøy	Veierland Church	Veierland	1901
Teie	Teie Church	Teie	1977
Torød	Torød Church	Torød	1915

== Geography ==
The whole municipality was made up of a group of islands located to the south of Tønsberg Municipality and between the Tønsbergfjorden and the Ytre Oslofjord. The municipality included almost all of the island of Nøtterøy plus the smaller islands of Føynland, Veierland, Bolærne, Bjerkøy, Nordre Årøy, and Søndre Årøy. In addition to this, there were also about 175 smaller islands and skerries. The island of Nøtterøy is the largest island in Vestfold County. The highest point in the municipality was the 99.7-metre (327 ft) tall mountain Vetan on the southern part of the island of Nøtterøy. The mountain was controlled by the Norwegian Armed Forces since 1897. The military operated a radio station at Vetan. The Fulehuk Lighthouse was located in Nøtterøy municipality.

Tønsberg Municipality was located to the north, the Skagerrak was located to the east, Tjøme Municipality was located to the south, and Sandefjord Municipality was located to the west.

== Government ==
While it existed, Nøtterøy Municipality was responsible for primary education (through 10th grade), outpatient health services, senior citizen services, welfare and other social services, zoning, economic development, and municipal roads and utilities. The municipality was governed by a municipal council of directly elected representatives. The mayor was indirectly elected by a vote of the municipal council. The municipality was under the jurisdiction of the Tønsberg District Court and the Agder Court of Appeal.

=== Municipal council ===
The municipal council (Kommunestyre) of Nøtterøy Municipality is made up of 35 representatives that are elected to four year terms. The tables below show the current and historical composition of the council by political party.

Nøtterøy kommunestyre 2015–2017
Party name (in Norwegian)	Number of representatives
Labour Party (Arbeiderpartiet)	11
Progress Party (Fremskrittspartiet)	5
Green Party (Miljøpartiet De Grønne)	2
Conservative Party (Høyre)	11
Christian Democratic Party (Kristelig Folkeparti)	2
Liberal Party (Venstre)	2
Joint list of the Red Party (Rødt) and the Socialist Left Party (Sosialistisk Venstreparti)	2
Total number of members:	35
Note: On 1 January 2018, Nøtterøy Municipality became part of Færder Municipality.

Nøtterøy kommunestyre 2011–2015
Party name (in Norwegian)	Number of representatives
Labour Party (Arbeiderpartiet)	12
Progress Party (Fremskrittspartiet)	5
Conservative Party (Høyre)	16
Christian Democratic Party (Kristelig Folkeparti)	2
Liberal Party (Venstre)	2
Nøtterøy List against the toll ring (Nøtterøylisten mot Bomring)	1
Joint list of the Red Party (Rødt) and the Socialist Left Party (Sosialistisk Venstreparti)	3
Total number of members:	39

Nøtterøy kommunestyre 2007–2011
Party name (in Norwegian)	Number of representatives
Labour Party (Arbeiderpartiet)	8
Progress Party (Fremskrittspartiet)	9
Conservative Party (Høyre)	13
Christian Democratic Party (Kristelig Folkeparti)	2
Liberal Party (Venstre)	2
Nøtterøy List against the toll ring (Nøtterøylisten mot Bomring)	2
Joint list of the Red Party (Rødt) and the Socialist Left Party (Sosialistisk Venstreparti)	5
Total number of members:	41

Nøtterøy kommunestyre 2003–2007
Party name (in Norwegian)	Number of representatives
Labour Party (Arbeiderpartiet)	5
Progress Party (Fremskrittspartiet)	14
Conservative Party (Høyre)	7
Christian Democratic Party (Kristelig Folkeparti)	2
Nøtterøy List against the toll ring (Nøtterøylisten mot Bomring)	5
Joint list of the Red Electoral Alliance (Rød Valgallianse) and the Socialist Left Party (Sosialistisk Venstreparti)	7
Joint list of the Centre Party (Senterpartiet) and the Liberal Party (Venstre)	1
Total number of members:	41

Nøtterøy kommunestyre 1999–2003
Party name (in Norwegian)	Number of representatives
Labour Party (Arbeiderpartiet)	7
Progress Party (Fremskrittspartiet)	8
Conservative Party (Høyre)	15
Christian Democratic Party (Kristelig Folkeparti)	3
Centre Party (Senterpartiet)	1
Liberal Party (Venstre)	1
Joint list of the Red Electoral Alliance (Rød Valgallianse) and the Socialist Left Party (Sosialistisk Venstreparti)	6
Total number of members:	41

Nøtterøy kommunestyre 1995–1999
Party name (in Norwegian)	Number of representatives
Labour Party (Arbeiderpartiet)	8
Progress Party (Fremskrittspartiet)	8
Conservative Party (Høyre)	17
Christian Democratic Party (Kristelig Folkeparti)	2
Red Electoral Alliance (Rød Valgallianse)	2
Centre Party (Senterpartiet)	1
Socialist Left Party (Sosialistisk Venstreparti)	2
Liberal Party (Venstre)	1
Total number of members:	41

Nøtterøy kommunestyre 1991–1995
Party name (in Norwegian)	Number of representatives
Labour Party (Arbeiderpartiet)	10
Progress Party (Fremskrittspartiet)	6
Conservative Party (Høyre)	15
Christian Democratic Party (Kristelig Folkeparti)	2
Red Electoral Alliance (Rød Valgallianse)	2
Centre Party (Senterpartiet)	1
Socialist Left Party (Sosialistisk Venstreparti)	4
Liberal Party (Venstre)	1
Total number of members:	41

Nøtterøy kommunestyre 1987–1991
Party name (in Norwegian)	Number of representatives
Labour Party (Arbeiderpartiet)	10
Progress Party (Fremskrittspartiet)	8
Conservative Party (Høyre)	17
Christian Democratic Party (Kristelig Folkeparti)	2
Red Electoral Alliance (Rød Valgallianse)	1
Socialist Left Party (Sosialistisk Venstreparti)	2
Liberal Party (Venstre)	1
Total number of members:	41

Nøtterøy kommunestyre 1983–1987
Party name (in Norwegian)	Number of representatives
Labour Party (Arbeiderpartiet)	11
Progress Party (Fremskrittspartiet)	5
Conservative Party (Høyre)	19
Christian Democratic Party (Kristelig Folkeparti)	2
Centre Party (Senterpartiet)	1
Socialist Left Party (Sosialistisk Venstreparti)	2
Liberal Party (Venstre)	1
Total number of members:	41

Nøtterøy kommunestyre 1979–1983
Party name (in Norwegian)	Number of representatives
Labour Party (Arbeiderpartiet)	11
Progress Party (Fremskrittspartiet)	1
Conservative Party (Høyre)	21
Christian Democratic Party (Kristelig Folkeparti)	3
Centre Party (Senterpartiet)	1
Socialist Left Party (Sosialistisk Venstreparti)	2
Liberal Party (Venstre)	2
Total number of members:	41

Nøtterøy kommunestyre 1975–1979
Party name (in Norwegian)	Number of representatives
Labour Party (Arbeiderpartiet)	12
Anders Lange's Party (Anders Langes parti)	1
Conservative Party (Høyre)	20
Christian Democratic Party (Kristelig Folkeparti)	3
New People's Party (Nye Folkepartiet)	1
Centre Party (Senterpartiet)	2
Socialist Left Party (Sosialistisk Venstreparti)	1
Liberal Party (Venstre)	1
Total number of members:	41

Nøtterøy kommunestyre 1971–1975
Party name (in Norwegian)	Number of representatives
Labour Party (Arbeiderpartiet)	15
Conservative Party (Høyre)	18
Christian Democratic Party (Kristelig Folkeparti)	2
Centre Party (Senterpartiet)	2
Socialist People's Party (Sosialistisk Folkeparti)	2
Liberal Party (Venstre)	2
Total number of members:	41

Nøtterøy kommunestyre 1967–1971
Party name (in Norwegian)	Number of representatives
Labour Party (Arbeiderpartiet)	16
Conservative Party (Høyre)	19
Christian Democratic Party (Kristelig Folkeparti)	2
Centre Party (Senterpartiet)	1
Socialist People's Party (Sosialistisk Folkeparti)	1
Liberal Party (Venstre)	2
Total number of members:	41

Nøtterøy kommunestyre 1963–1967
Party name (in Norwegian)	Number of representatives
Labour Party (Arbeiderpartiet)	17
Conservative Party (Høyre)	18
Christian Democratic Party (Kristelig Folkeparti)	2
Centre Party (Senterpartiet)	1
Socialist People's Party (Sosialistisk Folkeparti)	1
Liberal Party (Venstre)	2
Total number of members:	41

Nøtterøy herredsstyre 1959–1963
Party name (in Norwegian)	Number of representatives
Labour Party (Arbeiderpartiet)	17
Conservative Party (Høyre)	19
Christian Democratic Party (Kristelig Folkeparti)	2
Centre Party (Senterpartiet)	1
Liberal Party (Venstre)	2
Total number of members:	41

Nøtterøy herredsstyre 1955–1959
Party name (in Norwegian)	Number of representatives
Labour Party (Arbeiderpartiet)	17
Conservative Party (Høyre)	19
Christian Democratic Party (Kristelig Folkeparti)	2
Farmers' Party (Bondepartiet)	1
Liberal Party (Venstre)	2
Total number of members:	41

Nøtterøy herredsstyre 1951–1955
Party name (in Norwegian)	Number of representatives
Labour Party (Arbeiderpartiet)	13
Conservative Party (Høyre)	20
Christian Democratic Party (Kristelig Folkeparti)	2
Liberal Party (Venstre)	1
Total number of members:	36

Nøtterøy herredsstyre 1947–1951
Party name (in Norwegian)	Number of representatives
Labour Party (Arbeiderpartiet)	12
Communist Party (Kommunistiske Parti)	1
Christian Democratic Party (Kristelig Folkeparti)	3
Liberal Party (Venstre)	1
Joint List(s) of Non-Socialist Parties (Borgerlige Felleslister)	19
Total number of members:	36

Nøtterøy herredsstyre 1945–1947
Party name (in Norwegian)	Number of representatives
Labour Party (Arbeiderpartiet)	13
Conservative Party (Høyre)	15
Communist Party (Kommunistiske Parti)	1
Christian Democratic Party (Kristelig Folkeparti)	4
Local List(s) (Lokale lister)	3
Total number of members:	36

Nøtterøy herredsstyre 1937–1940*
Party name (in Norwegian)	Number of representatives
Labour Party (Arbeiderpartiet)	8
Conservative Party (Høyre)	25
Farmers' Party (Bondepartiet)	1
Liberal Party (Venstre)	2
Total number of members:	36
Note: Due to the German occupation of Norway during World War II, no elections were held for new municipal councils until after the war ended in 1945.

=== Mayors ===
The mayor (Norwegian: ordfører) of Nøtterøy Municipality was the political leader of the municipality and the chairperson of the municipal council. The following people have held this position:

- 1838–1838: Christian Severin Bloch Wille
- 1838–1839: Lars Evensen Glomsten
- 1839–1847: Jacob Andreas Wille
- 1847–1855: Johan Henrik Davidsen
- 1856–1857: Nils Ambjørnsen
- 1858–1859: Hans Christian Foden
- 1860–1867: Anders H. Gundersen
- 1868–1876: Anders Berg Bull
- 1877–1877: Peter Michael Bugge
- 1878–1891: Christian Kaldager
- 1892–1894: Nils Jacobsen
- 1895–1897: Anders O. Gundersen (H)
- 1898–1916: Jonathan Johnson (H)
- 1917–1919: Edvard Martin Jespersen (H)
- 1920–1922: Nils Christensen Agerup (H)
- 1923–1928: Edvard Martin Jespersen (H)
- 1929–1931: Jørgen Øhre (H)
- 1932–1941: Peter Syse (H)
- 1941–1942: Johannes Margido Jønland (NS)
- 1943–1945: Olaf Frich (NS)
- 1945–1948: Peter Syse (H)
- 1948–1953: Johan Møller Warmedal (H)
- 1954–1959: Hans Thorød-Hanssen (H)
- 1959–1969: Torgeir Andersen (H)
- 1969–1987: Sigurd Tjomstøl (H)
- 1987–1991: Bernt Johannessen (H)
- 1991–2003: Svein Harding Hansen (H)
- 2003–2007: Bjørn Kåre Sevik (FrP)
- 2007–2017: Roar Jonstang (H)

== Notable people ==
- Trygve Bratteli, a Prime minister of Norway
- Fred Anton Maier, a speed skater
- Jan P. Syse, a Prime Minister of Norway
- Tor Thodesen, a professional football manager

== See also ==
- List of former municipalities of Norway
