= Nøtterøy =

Nøtterøy may refer to:

== Places ==
- Nøtterøy (island), an island in Færder Municipality in Vestfold county, Norway
- Nøtterøy Municipality, a former municipality in Vestfold county, Norway
- Nøtterøy Church, a church in Færder Municipality in Vestfold county, Norway
- Nøtterøy prestegjeld, a former geographic subdivision of the Church of Norway in Vestfold county

== Sport ==
- Nøtterøy Open, a professional golf tournament in Norway
- Nøtterøy IL, a sports club based in Færder Municipality in Vestfold county, Norway
