= Carl E. Paulsen =

Norwegian sculptor

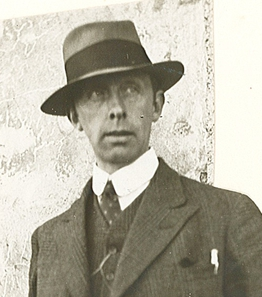
- Born: July 31, 1896; Kristiania, Norway
- Died: November 11, 1973 (aged 77); Tønsberg, Norway
- Occupation: Sculptor

Carl Edvard Alfonso Paulsen (July 31, 1896 – November 11, 1973) was a Norwegian sculptor.

== Education ==
Paulsen received his education as a sculptor at the Norwegian National Academy of Craft and Art Industry and with the Danish sculptor Rudolph Tegner in Copenhagen. He then studied with the French sculptor Antoine Bourdelle. He also made a number of study trips, including to Belgium, England, France, Italy, and the Netherlands, which influenced his work.

== Career ==
In Tønsberg, Paulsen is best known for his enthusiasm for the town. This was particularly evident after he became chairman of the Castle Hill Committee (Slottsfjellkomiteen) a few years after the war. As a guide to the town, he portrayed the old Tønsberg, and he was particularly interested in Princess Christina. He portrayed her life so that the audience gained an impression of her time through his descriptions of scenes, clothing, and individuals.

Paulsen was honored with the King's Medal of Merit in 1969. In 1967 the Tønsberg Marketing Association (Tønsberg Markedsforening) selected him for its first Red Rose (Røde rose) award, which is given to individuals, companies, or institutions that have shown ingenuity and initiative in fields that fall under the concept of marketing. When Paulsen died in 1973, he was an honorary pensioner of Tønsberg. Carl E. Paulsen Square (Carl E. Paulsens plass), which is behind today's Farmandstredet shopping center, the former Kremmer House (Kremmerhuset), is named after him.

== Works ==
=== Tønsberg ===
There are 13 works by Paulsen in Tønsberg:

- Memorial to the merchant Carl Stoltenberg in Stoltenberg Park (Stoltenberg-parken), 1926
- Roald Amundsen-monumentet (Roald Amundsen Monument), 1933
- Bust of the shipping magnate Wilhelm Wilhelmsen at the Gunnarsbø mansion, 1940
- Vækteren (The Watchman) in front of the former Vinmonopolet outlet on Main Street (Storgaten), 1950
- Bust of Prime Minister Abraham Berge on Seafront Promenade (Strandpromenaden), 1951
- Bust of Major Carsten Bruun on Priest Street (Prestegaten), 1956
- Bust of the shipowner Halfdan Wilhelmsen across from the Roald Amundsen Monument, 1961
- Førstereisgutten (The Boy's First Journey At Sea) at the Channel Bridge (Kanalbroen), 1963
- Pingvinene (The Penguins) on Walking Street (Gågaten), 1967
- Monument to the painter Mathias Stoltenberg in Stoltenberg Park, 1971
- Bust of King Haakon VII at the county museum, 1972
- Bust of the sea captain Christian Nielsen Stranger at the Haugar farm, undated

=== Nøtterøy ===
- Bust of the captain and tanker ship inventor Even Tollefsen in the Teie neighborhood on Nøtterøy, 1941
- War memorial in the park by Nøtterøy Church
- Relief in the Nøtterøy Church porch

=== Horten ===
- Oscar Wisting monument, 1938
- Leif Welding-Olsen, statue, bronze, 1950
- Fountain (figures) in bronze and granite in the square in Horten, 1954

=== Other locations ===
- Cort Adeler monument in Brevik, 1922
- Bust of Lorens Berg at Kodal Church, 1928
- Roald Amundsen monument at Prostneset in Tromsø, 1936
- Statue of Otto Sverdrup in Steinkjer, 1957
- Bust of King Haakon VII at Gamlehaugen in Bergen
- King's bust in King Haakon's Church in Copenhagen
- Relief av King Olav V the Norwegian Seamen's Church in Gothenburg
- Monument to Captain Magnus Andersen in Lincoln Park, Chicago
- Bust of the administrative officer Anders Arnoldsøn Rørholt outside the power station at Hvittingfoss
