= Borgheim =

Village in Færder Municipality, Norway

- Village
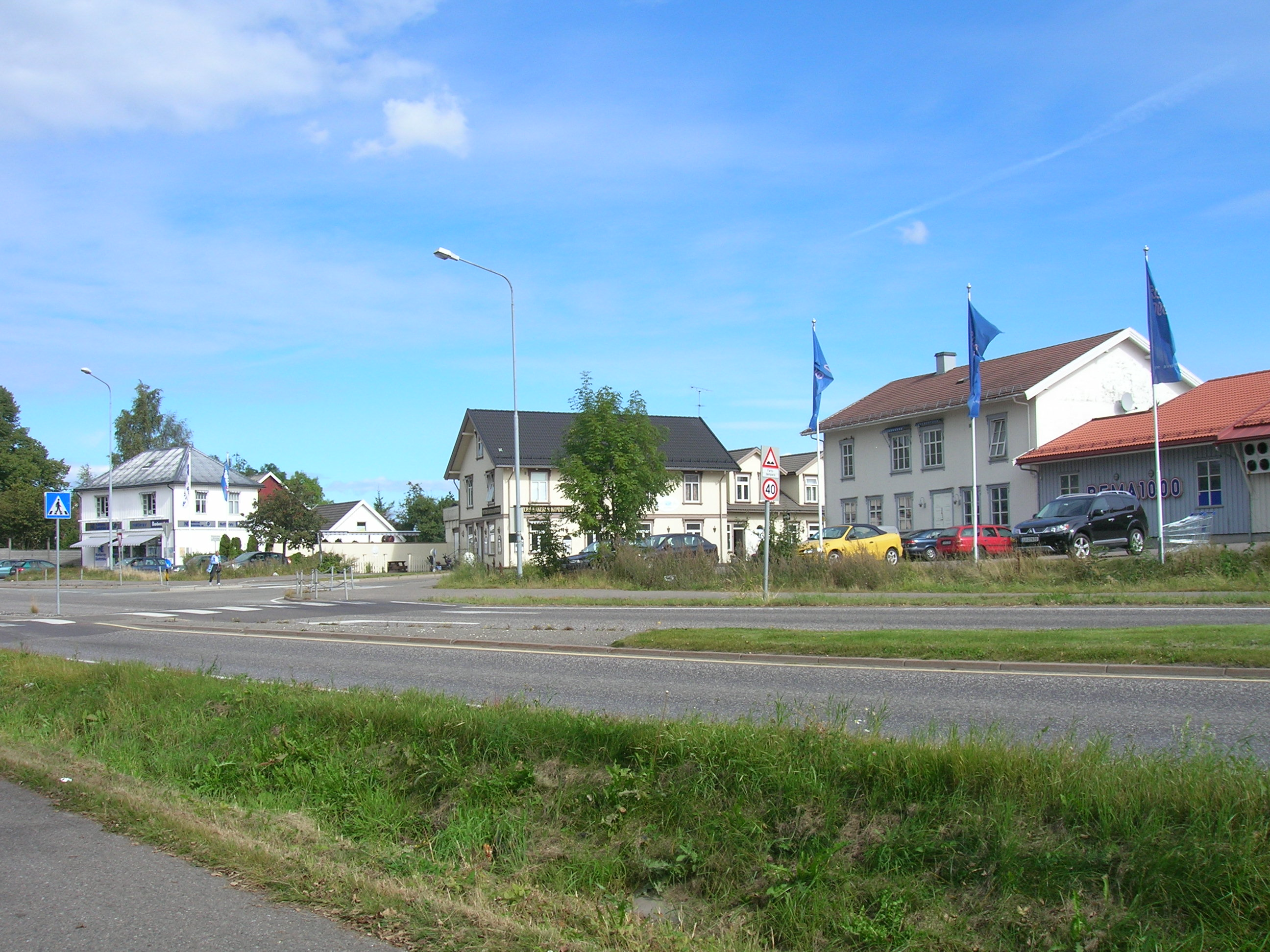
- View of the village
- Interactive map of Borgheim
- Coordinates: 59.22629°N 10.40745°E
- Country: Norway
- Region: Eastern Norway
- County: Vestfold
- Municipality: Færder Municipality
- Elevation: 14 m (46 ft)
- Time zone: UTC+01:00 (CET)
  - Summer (DST): UTC+02:00 (CEST)
- Post Code: 3140 Nøtterøy

Borgheim is a village and the administrative centre of Færder Municipality in Vestfold county, Norway. The village is located in the central part of the island of Nøtterøy. The village lies about 2.5 kilometres (1.6 mi) west of the village of Nesbrygga, about 2 kilometres (1.2 mi) to the northwest of the village of Vollen, about 3.5 kilometres (2.2 mi) north of the village of Skjerve, and about 2 kilometres (1.2 mi) southeast of the village of Vestskogen. The historic Nøtterøy Church is located in Borgheim.

The village of Borgheim and the surrounding countryside has a population (in 2026) of 617. It is considered to be part of the urban city of Tønsberg metropolitan area which includes the central city area plus the northern and eastern parts of the island of Nøtterøy.

== History ==
Prior to 2018, Borgheim was the administrative centre of the old Nøtterøy Municipality. In 2018, Nøtterøy Municipality and Tjøme Municipality were merged into Færder Municipality and Borgheim became the administrative centre of the new municipality.
