= Teie Church =

Church in Vestfold, Norway

- Teie kirke
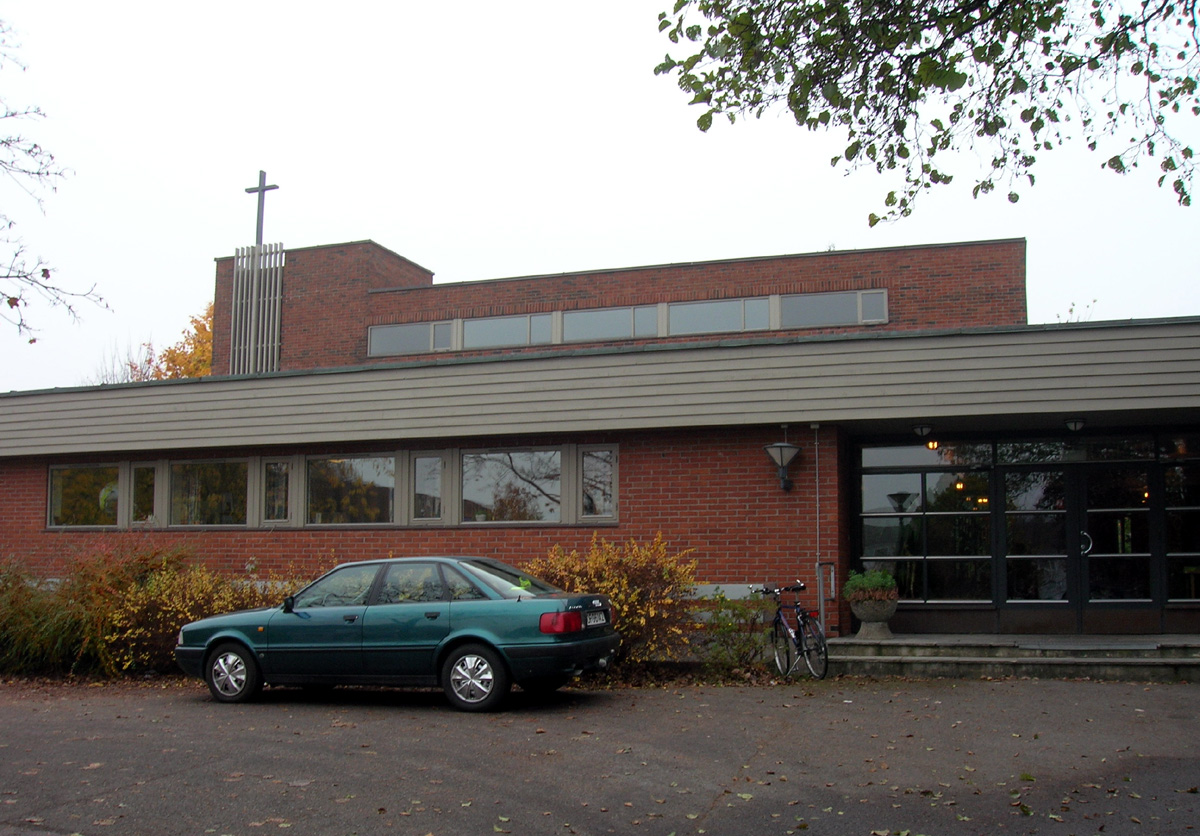
- View of the church
- Teie Church
- 59°15′05″N 10°25′00″E
- Location: Færder Municipality, Vestfold
- Country: Norway
- Denomination: Church of Norway
- Churchmanship: Evangelical Lutheran

History
- Status: Parish church
- Founded: 1977
- Consecrated: 3 April 1977

Architecture
- Functional status: Active
- Architect: Elisabeth Fidjestøl
- Architectural type: Rectangular
- Completed: 1977 (49 years ago)

Specifications
- Capacity: 520
- Materials: Brick

Administration
- Diocese: Tunsberg
- Deanery: Tønsberg domprosti
- Parish: Teie
- Norwegian Cultural Heritage Site
- Type: Church
- Status: Not protected

Teie Church (Norwegian: Teie kirke) is a parish church of the Church of Norway in Færder Municipality in Vestfold county, Norway. It is located in the village of Teie. It is the church for the Teie parish which is part of the Tønsberg domprosti (deanery) in the Diocese of Tunsberg. The red brick church was built in a rectangular design in 1977 using plans drawn up by the architect Elisabeth Breen Fidjestøl. The church seats about 520 people.

== History ==
The church was built to serve the northern part of the island of Nøtterøy. The first stage of construction was to build a daycare facility for children. The foundation stone for it was laid in November 1963, and the new building was ready in the autumn of 1964. The daycare facility was consecrated in January 1965. About 10 years later, the second phase of construction took place. A large chapel addition was added on to the daycare. The new chapel (later renamed as a church) was consecrated on 3 April 1977. It has 520 seats, but it can be expanded to 600 if necessary.

== See also ==
- List of churches in Tunsberg
