= Even Tollefsen =

Norwegian captain and inventor (1841–1897)

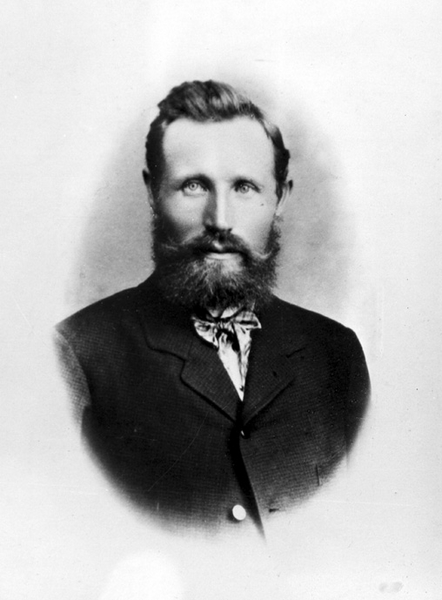
- Born: September 4, 1841; Nøtterøy, Norway
- Died: June 21, 1897 (aged 55); Mistaken Point, Canada
- Occupations: Inventor, sea captain

Even Tollefsen (September 4, 1841 – June 21, 1897) (Note: Two contemporary Norwegian newspaper accounts report the sinking of Tollefsen's ship, the Magnhild, as July 21, 1897; however, American newspaper reports already published in June and his death notice make it clear that the ship sank on June 21.) was a Norwegian sea captain and inventor.

Tollefsen built the first useful system for shipping oil in tankers. He was a talented engineer that acquired most of his technical knowledge and skills through self-study.

== Life ==
Even Tollefsen was the son of Torleif (Tollef) Hansen (1806–1885) and Kristine Marie Evensdatter (1807–1860) and was born at Østre Oterbekk on the island of Nøtterøy. His father was a sailor and a farmer. The family lived in several places on Nøtterøy until his father purchased the Tømmerholt farm on Nøtterøy in 1851.

After he was confirmed, Tollefsen went to sea. Later he took the mate's and skipper's courses at the Tønsberg Seamen's School (Norwegian: Tønsberg Sjømannsskole). He graduated in 1864 and was hired by Gustav Conrad Hansen's newly established shipping company.

Tollefsen was employed by Hansen's shipping company throughout his professional career. In 1897 he was captain of the full rig Magnhild when the coal cargo shifted during a storm off the coast of Newfoundland and the ship went down. Most of the lifeboats were shattered when the Magnhild capsized, but Tollefsen commanded the crew into the only usable lifeboat left and most were rescued. Tollefsen himself remained at his post and perished with his ship.

=== The first oil tankers ===
Crude oil was originally transported in barrels. There was no good solution either financially or technically, partly because of fire hazards and problems with leaks and odors, which made it difficult to use the ships to transport other goods such as grain afterwards.

Tollefsen therefore designed a system for shipping oil as bulk cargo and convinced the shipowner to put the system into practice. The world's first three usable oil tankers were created by rebuilding the brig Jan Mayn, the barque Stadt and the barque Lindesnæs. The work was carried out at the Fagerheim yard on Nøtterøy in the winter of 1877–1878. The oil was loaded into chambers built of wooden planks, and a technical challenges included oil that splashed out and seawater that penetrated into the wooden tanks. The ships also had to resist wobbling and pitching. In 1878 the system was tested by sailing the Jan Mayn to New York with water in the tanks and to Rouen with oil. With that, the Jan Mayn became the world's first oil tanker.

The Jan Mayn (258 gross register tonnage) proved too small to be profitable, the Stadt (377 grt) was lost, but the Lindesnæs (674 grt) operated in the Atlantic for many years, with Even Tollefsen himself as captain. The business was very lucrative for both the shipowner and the charterer, and in 1886 Tollefsen outfitted two new ships: the Einar (625 grt) and the Rolf (1,211 grt), and then two more in the early 1890s. He improved the system along the way by developing an ingenious system of pumps and hoses that took care of waste oil and separated out seawater that penetrated the tanks.

Rebuilt sailing ships with oil in wooden tanks had their heyday in the 1880s, but throughout the 1890s they were out-competed by steam-powered iron tankers.

== Legacy ==
Tollefsen did not patent his inventions and, although foreign shipping companies used his system for many decades into the 1900s, they failed to credit him, and so his name was quickly forgotten. During the Jubilee Exhibition at Frogner in 1914, the shipowner Gustav Conrad Hansen was honored as the creator of the world's first tanker ship owner without Tollefsen's name being mentioned. Henry Tschudi (1858–1939) and Axel Camillo Eitzen, both of whom had followed Tollefsen's work at the Fagerheim shipyard and participated in the subsequent oil-freighting period, made the world aware that Tollefsen alone deserved the credit for the technical innovations, whereas the shipowner Gustav Hansen was a businessman that was able to financially exploit the invention.

For the 100th anniversary of Tollefsen's birth in 1941, the Tønsberg Seamen's Association set up a bust of Tollefsen at Teie on Nøtterøy. Every May 17, a wreath-laying ceremony is held at the bust. Just below the park with Tollefsen's bust is Even Tollefsens vei (Even Tollefsen Road).
