= Pål Kårbø =

Norwegian politician

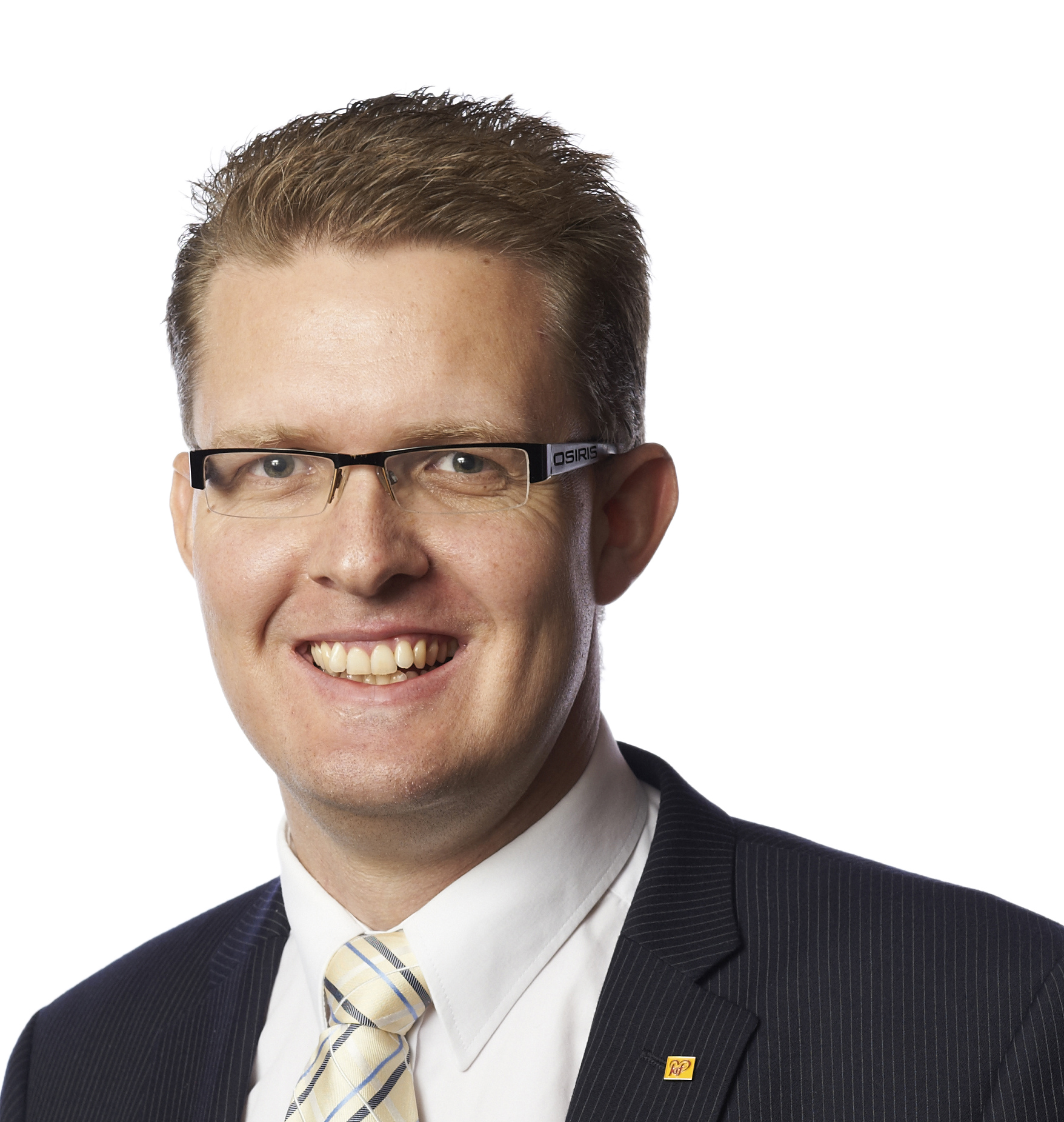
Pål Kårbø

Pål Kårbø (born 27 May 1973) is a Norwegian politician for the Christian Democratic Party.

He served in the position of deputy representative to the Parliament of Norway from Hordaland during the term 2001–2005. In total he met during 68 days of parliamentary session. Following several terms in Hordaland county council he became deputy county mayor in 2015.
