= Føynland =

Island in Vestfold, Norway

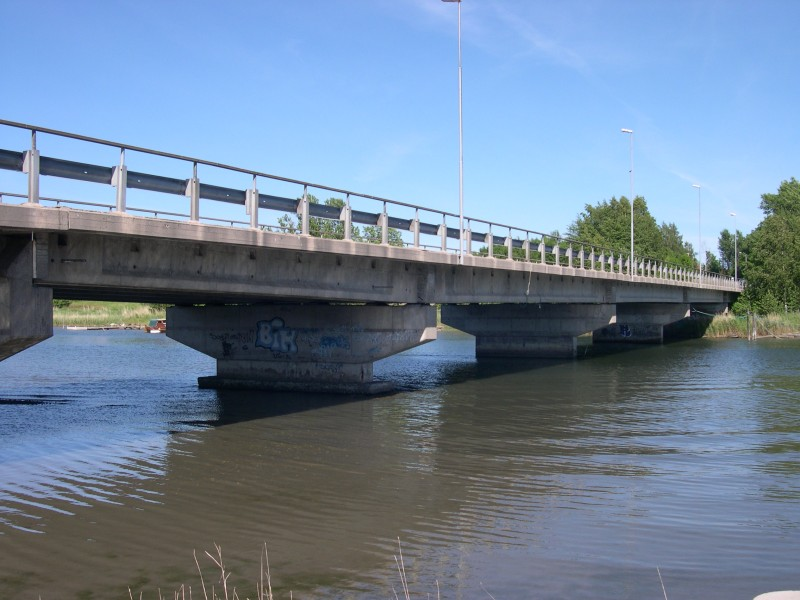
- The Føynland bridge, connecting Føynland to Nøtterøy
- Interactive map of the island

Geography
- Location: Vestfold, Norway
- Coordinates: 59.2377°N 10.4458°E
- Area: 2.1 km^{2} (0.81 sq mi)

Administration
- Norway
- County: Vestfold
- Municipality: Færder Municipality

Føynland is an island in Færder Municipality in Vestfold county, Norway. The 2.1-square-kilometre (0.81 sq mi) island lies in between the large island of Nøtterøy and the smaller island of Husøy (in Tønsberg Municipality). The island is connected to the two neighboring islands by bridges. The densely populated northern part of the island is considered part of the metropolitan area of the city of Tønsberg.

== See also ==
- List of islands of Norway
