= Eirik Langeland Fjeld =

Norwegian politician (born 1973)

Eirik Langeland Fjeld (born 6 September 1973) is a Norwegian politician for the Socialist Left Party.

He served as a deputy representative to the Norwegian Parliament from Hordaland during the term 1997–2001.

He currently resides in Bergen.
