= Hanna Jessen =

Norwegian sculptor, lecturer and non-fiction author

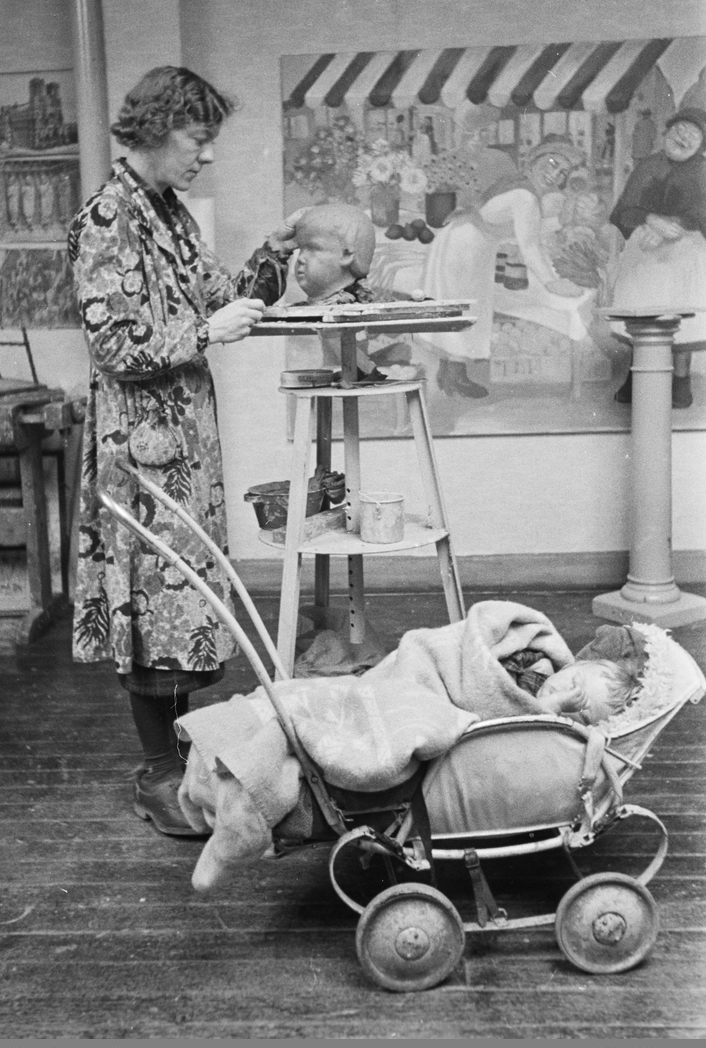
- Sculptor Hanna Jessen in 1940

Hanna Jessen (born 29 June 1907 in Kristiania, died 11 October 1973 in Oslo) was a Norwegian sculptor, lecturer and non-fiction author.

== Early life and education ==
Hanna Jessen was the daughter of engineer Christian Jessen and Olga Jessen (born Corneliussen). Jessen studied sculptor with Torbjørn Alvsåker, Wilhelm Rasmussen, Antoine Bourdelle and Ossip Zadkine as teachers. She also spent some time studying in the Dresden Academy of Fine Arts.

== Career ==
In 1934, the National Museum of Art, Architecture and Design purchased the bronze bust Helene. This was a work Jessen had completed the year before, and it was purchased for funds from Benneche's endowment.

In 1950, she showed three works at "The Official Finnish Exhibition" in Oslo: Liv, which belonged to Larvik, as well as Synnøve (a portrait in soapstone of the textile artist Synnøve Anker Aurdal), a sculpture in soapstone, and Piken med blokfløyten, which was carved in granite.

A child's portrait in bronze from 1954, titled Piken med fuglen was installed in Schous plass in Oslo. Piken med fuglen was a testementary gift to the city from Liv Skavlan Reiss. In Oslo, there is also the bronze sculpture Barn som lærer å gå (1962); this work was placed at the base of a pool in the Ditten complex in Akersgata 55. Selvaagbygg A/S donated a soapstone sculpture by Jessen to be placed at the intersection of Veitvetveien/Grevlingveien in Veitvet; the motif is a mother holding her small child.

Among other works by Jessen is a portrait bust of her sculptor colleague Emma Matthiasen, and a portrait of the singer Gudrun Grave Nordlund (1956). A sculpture of a girl in bronze is located in a flower bed in Herregården in Larvik, and both Askim and Haugesund municipalities own examples of her bronze sculpture Fløytespilleren.

She has made several war memorials, including the three metre high memorial at Nyborg kirke in Nyborg i Åsane. The memorial has reliefs in a variant of dragestil among its motifs.

Jessen was elected to the supervisory board of Kunstnernes Hus in Oslo, as a representative of sculptors, in 1952/1953/1954. She was re-elected to the supervisory board in 1967/1968/1969, and again in 1970/1971/1972. She was again reelected in 1973/1974/1975, but died in 1973.

In 1955, Jessen was one of the winners in a competition to design a memorial for the actress Johanne Dybwad.

== Teaching work ==
Jessen spent many years as a private sculpture teacher, before becoming senior lecturer at Statens Håndverks- og Kunstindustriskole. She worked at the school until her death in 1973.

== Writing ==
In 1960, Jessen published the book Modellering som hobby : forming i leire, brenning og gipsstøping, stein og tre from Fabritius publishing
