= Vestskogen =

Village in Færder, Norway

- Village
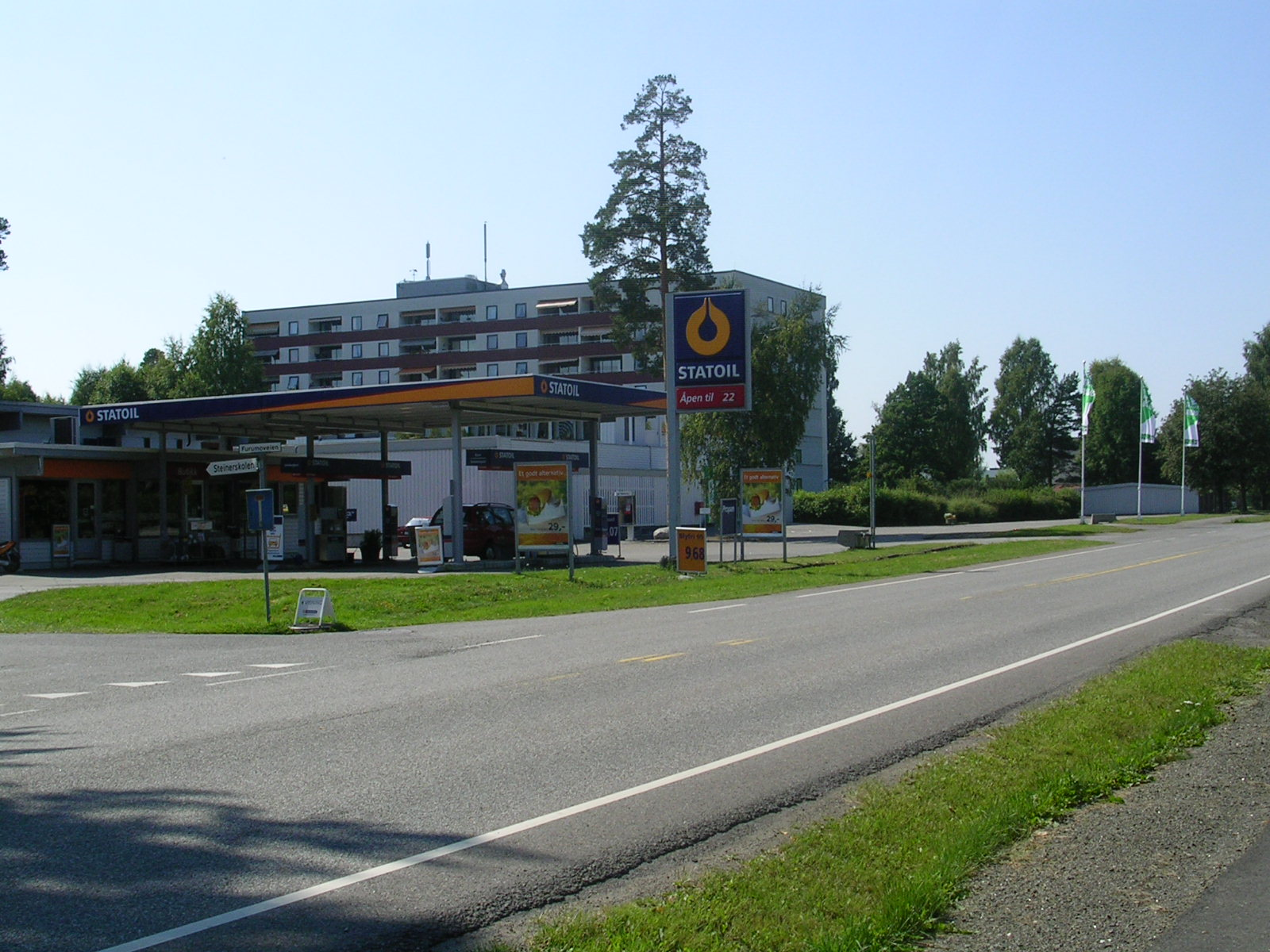
- View of the village
- Interactive map of Vestskogen
- Coordinates: 59.24496°N 10.3991°E
- Country: Norway
- Region: Eastern Norway
- County: Vestfold
- Municipality: Færder Municipality
- Elevation: 37 m (121 ft)
- Time zone: UTC+01:00 (CET)
  - Summer (DST): UTC+02:00 (CEST)
- Post Code: 3142 Vestskogen

Vestskogen is a village in Færder Municipality in Vestfold county, Norway. The village is located on the northwestern coast of the island of Nøtterøy. The village area lies about 5 kilometres (3.1 mi) to the southwest of the centre of the city of Tønsberg, about 3 kilometres (1.9 mi) to the northwest of the village of Borgheim, and about 1.5 kilometres (0.93 mi) to the west of Teie.

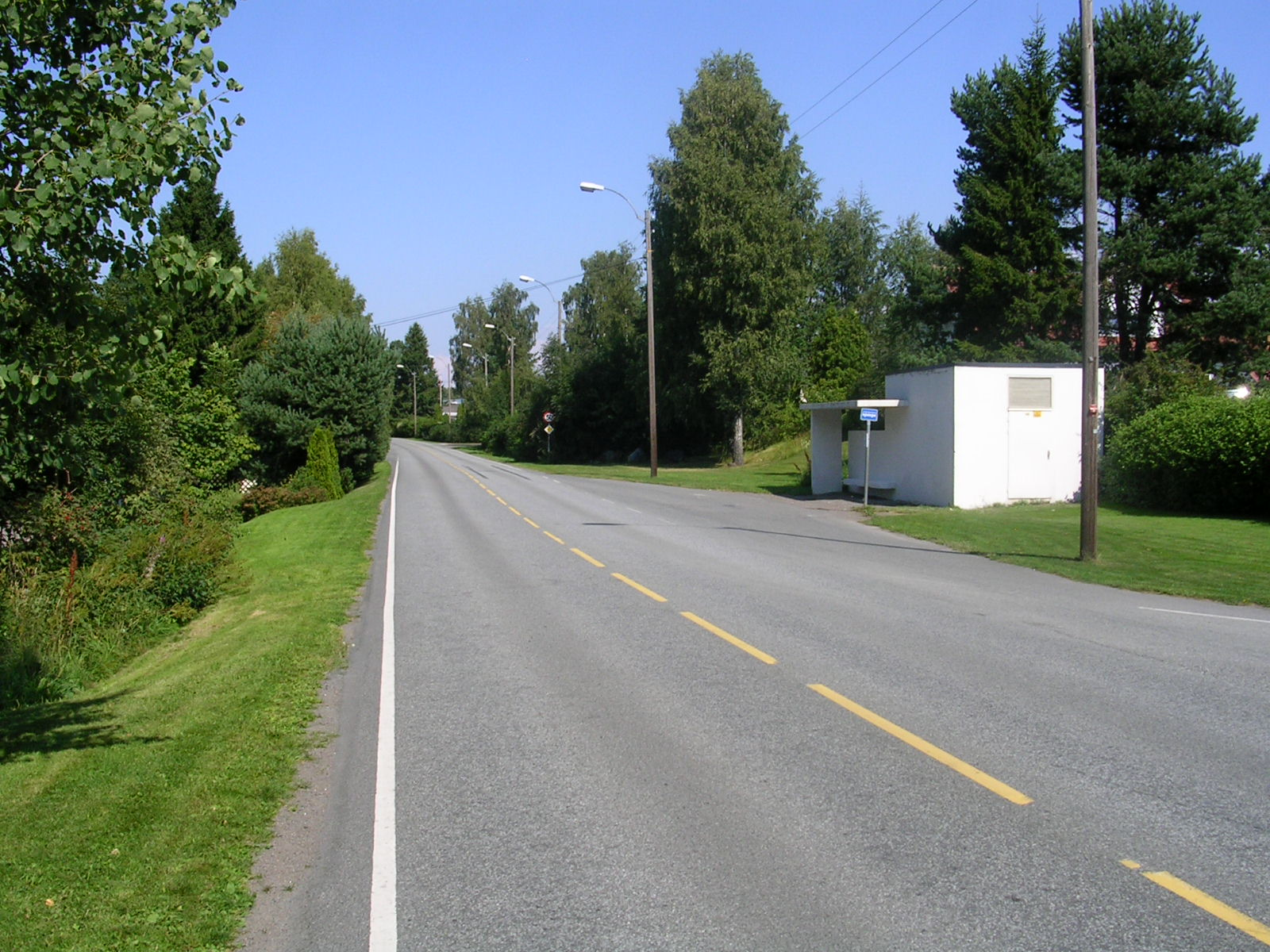
Amundrødveien, one of the main roads in Vestskogen

The Vestskogen area has a population (in 2026) of 1,963. It is considered to be part of the urban city of Tønsberg metropolitan area which includes the central city area plus the northern and eastern parts of the island of Nøtterøy.
