= Olav Bergersen =

Norwegian politician

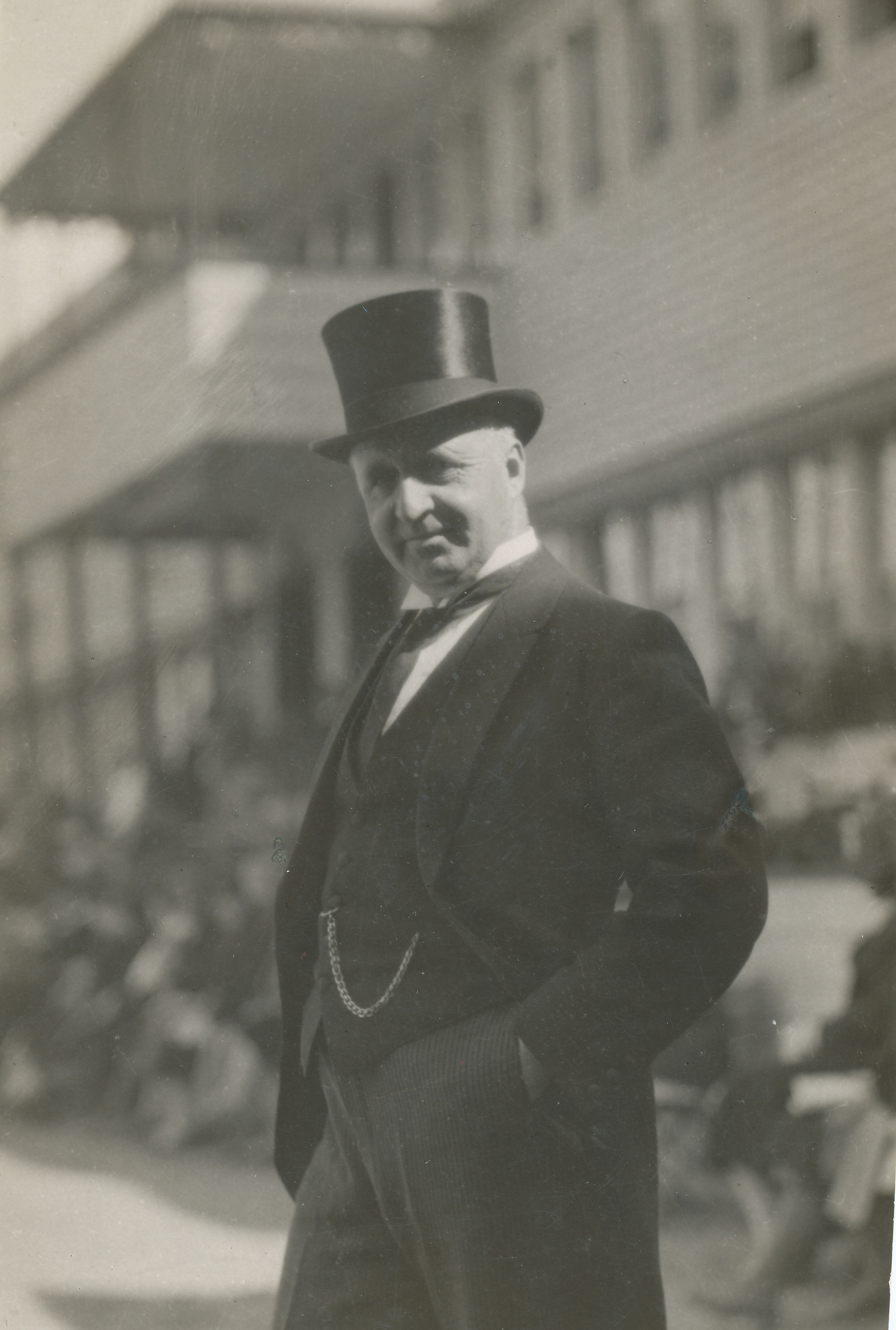
- Bergersen c.1930
- Born: 2 July 1880; Strinda Municipality, Norway
- Died: 17 December 1973 (aged 93)
- Occupations: Naval officer War historian Insurance inspector Politician
- Notable work: Several books on Peter Tordenskjold
- Relatives: Hilmar Meincke Krohg (great-grandfather)
- Awards: Order of St. Olav; King's Medal of Merit; Defence Medal 1940–1945

Olav Bergersen (2 July 1880 – 17 December 1973) was a Norwegian naval officer, war historian, insurance inspector and politician. He was a member of the Storting from 1931–1933, and served with the Admiral Staff of the Royal Norwegian Navy in London during the Second World War.

== Personal life ==
Bergersen was born in Strinda Municipality to judge Bernhard Konrad Bergersen and Marie Magdalene Selmer, and was a great-grandson of politician Hilmar Meincke Krohg. He married Ynghild Gønnning in 1906.

== Career ==
Bergersen graduated as naval officer in 1901. He was promoted to Premier Lieutenant in 1904, to Captain in 1912, and Commander in 1945. He was assigned with the insurance company Trondhjems Forsikringsselskap from 1919 to 1945.

He was a member of the municipal council of Horten Municipality from 1910 to 1915, and the municipal council of Trondheim Municipality from 1925 to 1937. He was a deputy member of the Storting from 1928–1930 (meeting for Worm Hirsch Darre-Jenssen in 1928), and was elected representative to the Storting for the period 1931–1933, for the Conservative Party. During the Second World War he was held five months in 1942 at the Falstad concentration camp, as a hostage. In 1943 he escaped German-occupied Norway to neutral Sweden and made his way to the United Kingdom, where he served with the admiral staff of the Royal Norwegian Navy.

He was member of the advisory board of the Norwegian Maritime Museum and a board member of Nordenfjeldske Kunstindustrimuseum.

His books include the two-volume Viceadmiral Tordenskiold (1925), Tordenskiold og danskene (1932), Fra Henrik Bielke til Iver Huitfeldt (1953–56, four volumes), and Tragedien omkring Tordenskiolds død (1963). He edited a book on Tordenskiold's letters in 1964, and wrote the two-volume Nøytralitet og krig in 1966.

He was awarded the Norwegian Defence Medal 1940–1945 and the King's Medal of Merit in gold, and was decorated Commander of the Order of St. Olav in 1962.

Bergersen died on 17 December 1973.
