= Mahmona Khan =

Norwegian author and journalist

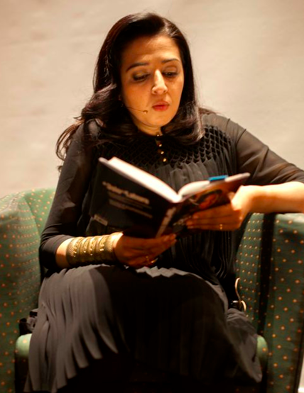
Mahmona Khan

Mahmona Khan (born 16 October 1973) is a Norwegian author, writer, film and documentarymaker. Prior to this she was a journalist and a social commentator.

== Early life and journalistic career ==
Khan was born in Norway in 1973 to parents from Pakistan who had emigrated to Oslo at the beginning of the 1970s. She grew up in the Oslo neighborhood Romsås, but lived in Pakistan from when she was eight to eleven years of age.

She started X-plosiv, a magazine for youth from minority backgrounds in 1995. The magazine later became an online site which Khan edited from 2007 to 2010.

She worked as a political journalist in Dagbladet in 1998 and then in LO-aktuelt, a magazine for the Norwegian Confederation of Trade Unions, from 2000 to 2009.

In 2010, Khan was one of two Norwegian representatives at the first Presidential Summit on Entrepreneurship which President Barack Obama announced in his 2009 Cairo speech and whose aim was to strengthen ties between entrepreneurs and business leaders in Muslim communities worldwide and the United States.

Khan's first novel, Skitten snø (Dirty Snow), was published in 2011. The young adult novel tells the story of a young Pakistani rape victim and how she and three other girls in Groruddalen, Oslo, seek revenge without involving the police, fearing that reporting the assault would damage the family's reputation. The novel received positive reviews and gained a wide readership. Two follow-up novels, Fra Oslo til Lahore (From Oslo to Lahore) and Når du minst venter det (When You Least Expect It), were published in 2013 and 2015.

In 2019, the novel was adapted into the NRK television drama Tainted (Norwegian title: Skitten snø), produced by Miso Film Norway. Khan served as the series creator, co-writer and one of the adapters of the novel for television. https://tv.nrk.no/serie/skitten-snoe

Khan is currently developing the documentary series Tracing Light – Nur ki Talash, which follows her journey exploring the life and legacy of the Mughal empress Nur Jahan through archival research, interviews and travels in the United Kingdom, Pakistan and Norway.https://www.youtube.com/watch?v=wRPquAFJIcw

== Personal life ==
Khan is married with two children. The family resides in Norway, Oslo.
