= Nøtterøy Church =

Church in Vestfold, Norway

- Nøtterøy kirke
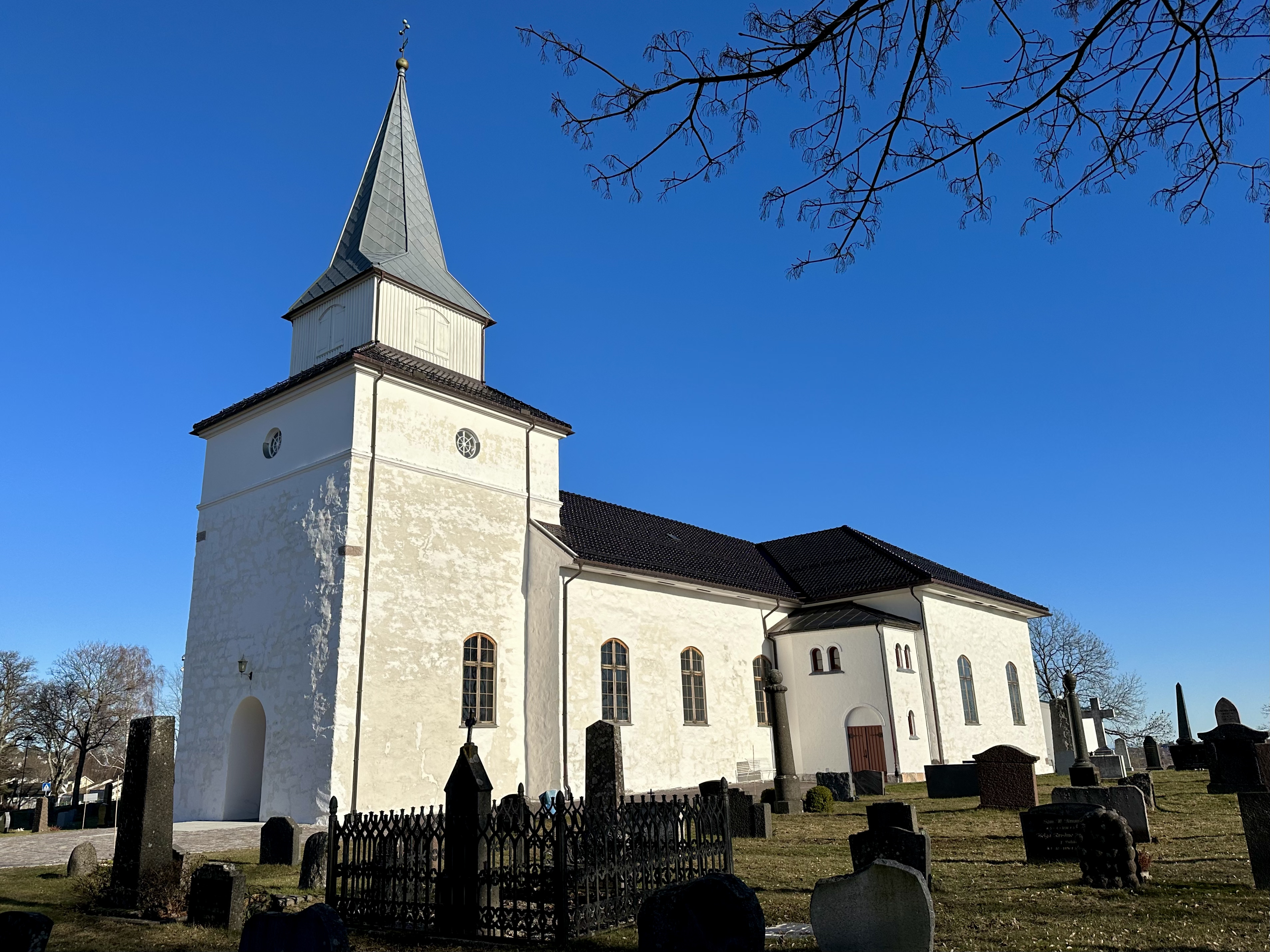
- View of the church
- Nøtterøy Church
- 59°13′49″N 10°24′25″E
- Location: Færder Municipality, Vestfold
- Country: Norway
- Denomination: Church of Norway
- Previous denomination: Catholic Church
- Churchmanship: Evangelical Lutheran

History
- Status: Parish church
- Founded: 12th century
- Consecrated: 12th century

Architecture
- Functional status: Active
- Architectural type: Long church
- Completed: c. 1100 (926 years ago)

Specifications
- Capacity: 500
- Materials: Stone

Administration
- Diocese: Tunsberg
- Deanery: Tønsberg domprosti
- Parish: Nøtterøy
- Norwegian Cultural Heritage Site
- Type: Church
- Status: Automatically protected
- ID: 85195

Nøtterøy Church (Norwegian: Nøtterøy kirke) is a parish church of the Church of Norway in Færder Municipality in Vestfold county, Norway. It is located in the village of Borgheim. It is one of the churches for the Nøtterøy parish which is part of the Tønsberg domprosti (deanery) in the Diocese of Tunsberg. The white, stone church was originally built with a long church design around the year 1100 using plans drawn up by an unknown architect. The church seats about 500 people.

== History ==
The earliest existing historical records of the church date back to the year 1327, but the church was not built that year. The church was likely built in the early 12th century. Originally, it was a simple long church with a choir with a curved apse end. When it was first built, it measured about 33 by 11.5 metres (108 ft × 38 ft). The church was originally dedicated to the Virgin Mary. The church walls were built with brick and rubble technique. The Count of Jarlsberg owned the church from 1673 to 1770 when he sold it to some local farmers.

In 1814, this church served as an election church (Norwegian: valgkirke). Together with more than 300 other parish churches across Norway, it was a polling station for elections to the 1814 Norwegian Constituent Assembly which wrote the Constitution of Norway. This was Norway's first national elections. Each church parish was a constituency that elected people called "electors" who later met together in each county to elect the representatives for the assembly that was to meet at Eidsvoll Manor later that year.

In 1837, the municipality took over the ownership of the church and immediately began discussing enlarging the church. In 1839, the church was given cross arms to give it a cruciform floor plan. The nave and tower were also repaired at this time. Then in 1862, the wooden part of the tower was removed, and the tower was rebuilt and made approximately 2.5 metres (8 ft 2 in) taller. In 1883, the church was extended eastwards by builder F. Meyer according to plans by Jacob Wilhelm Nordan. It now appears as a cruciform church with a west tower. To the east there is a chancel surrounded by vestries, and there are stairwells to the north and south at the corners of the transepts (to the second-floor seating galleries). After the 1883 renovation, the church measured about 46 by 23 metres (151 ft × 75 ft).

== Media gallery ==
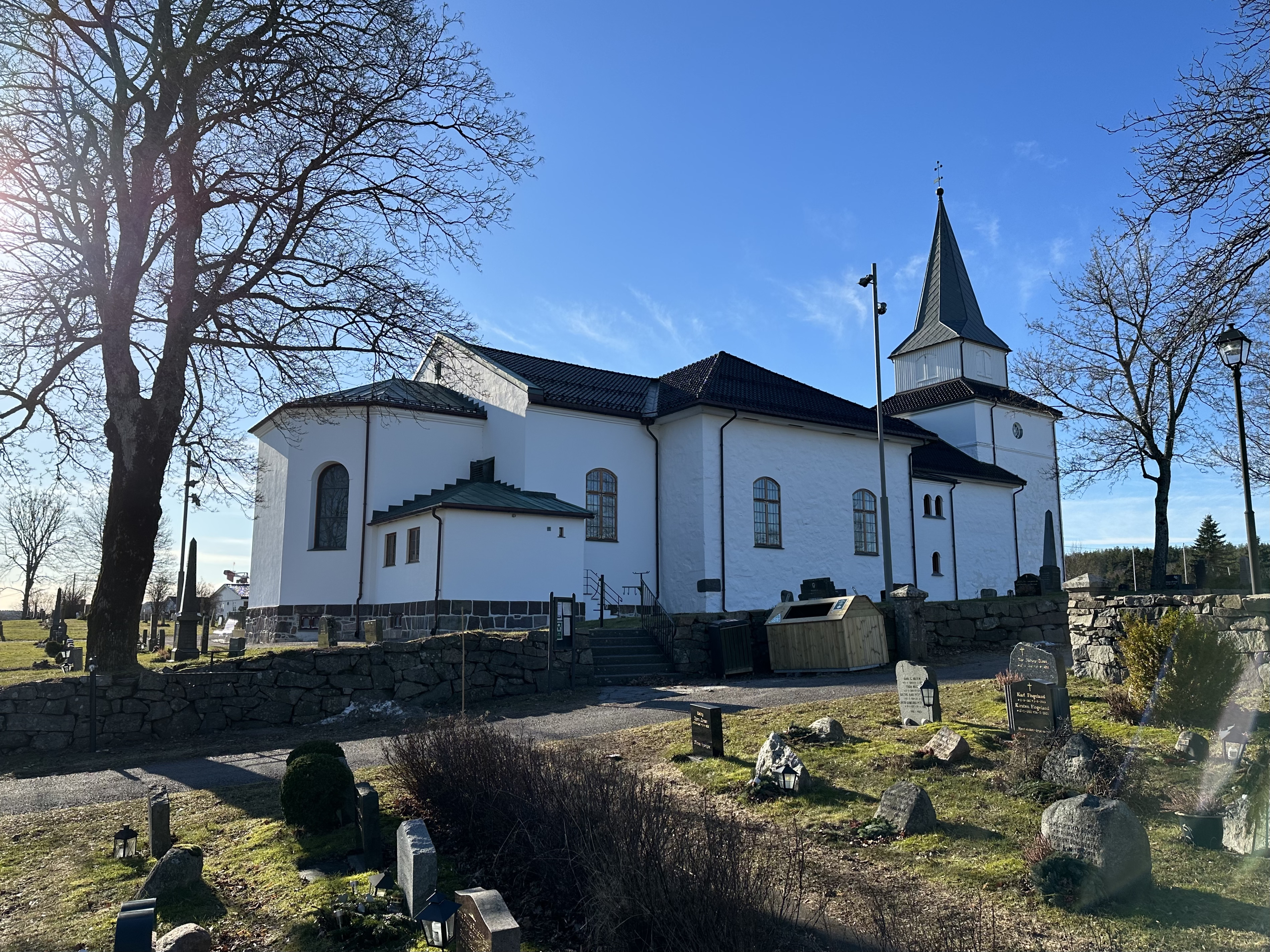

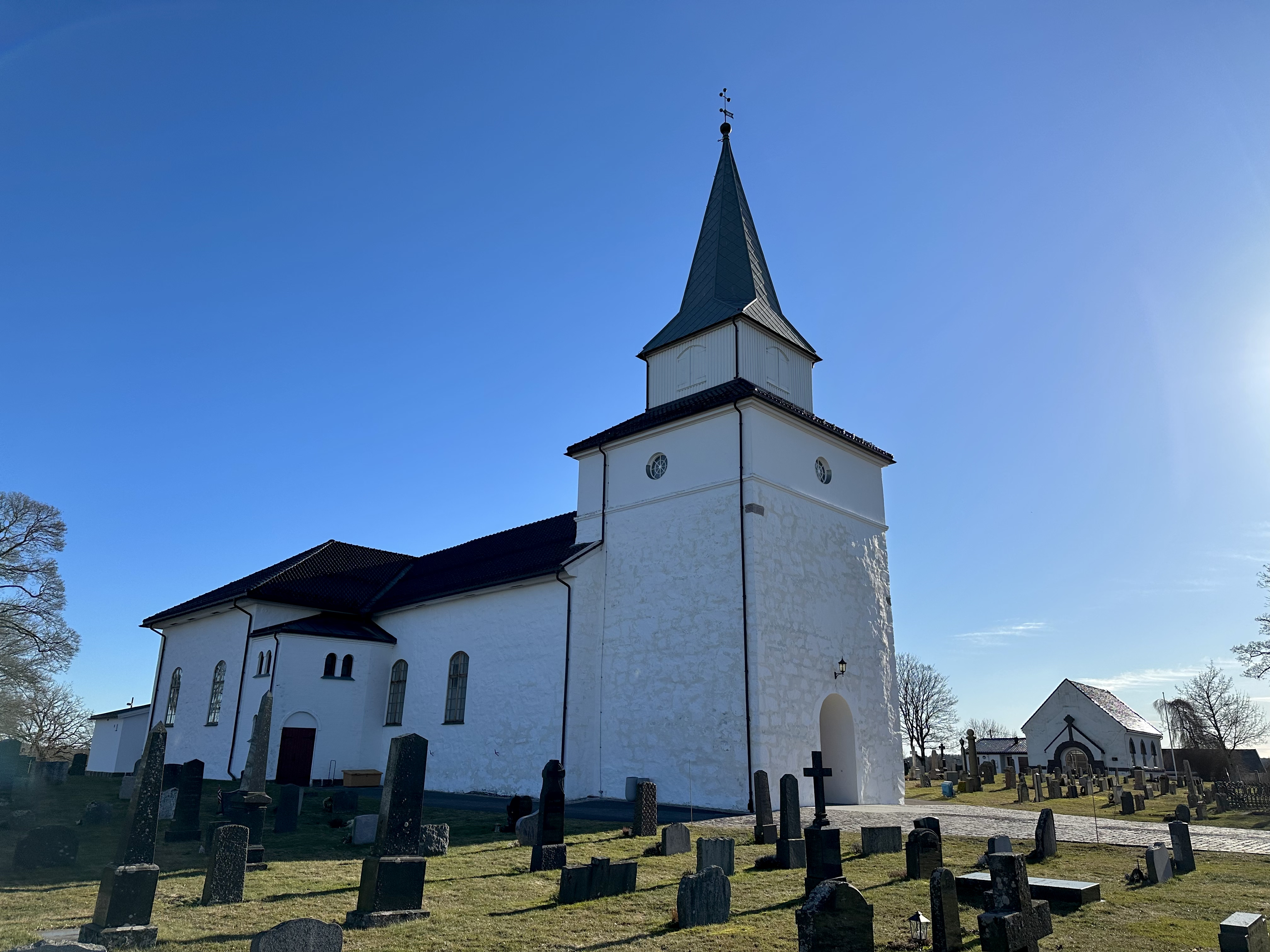

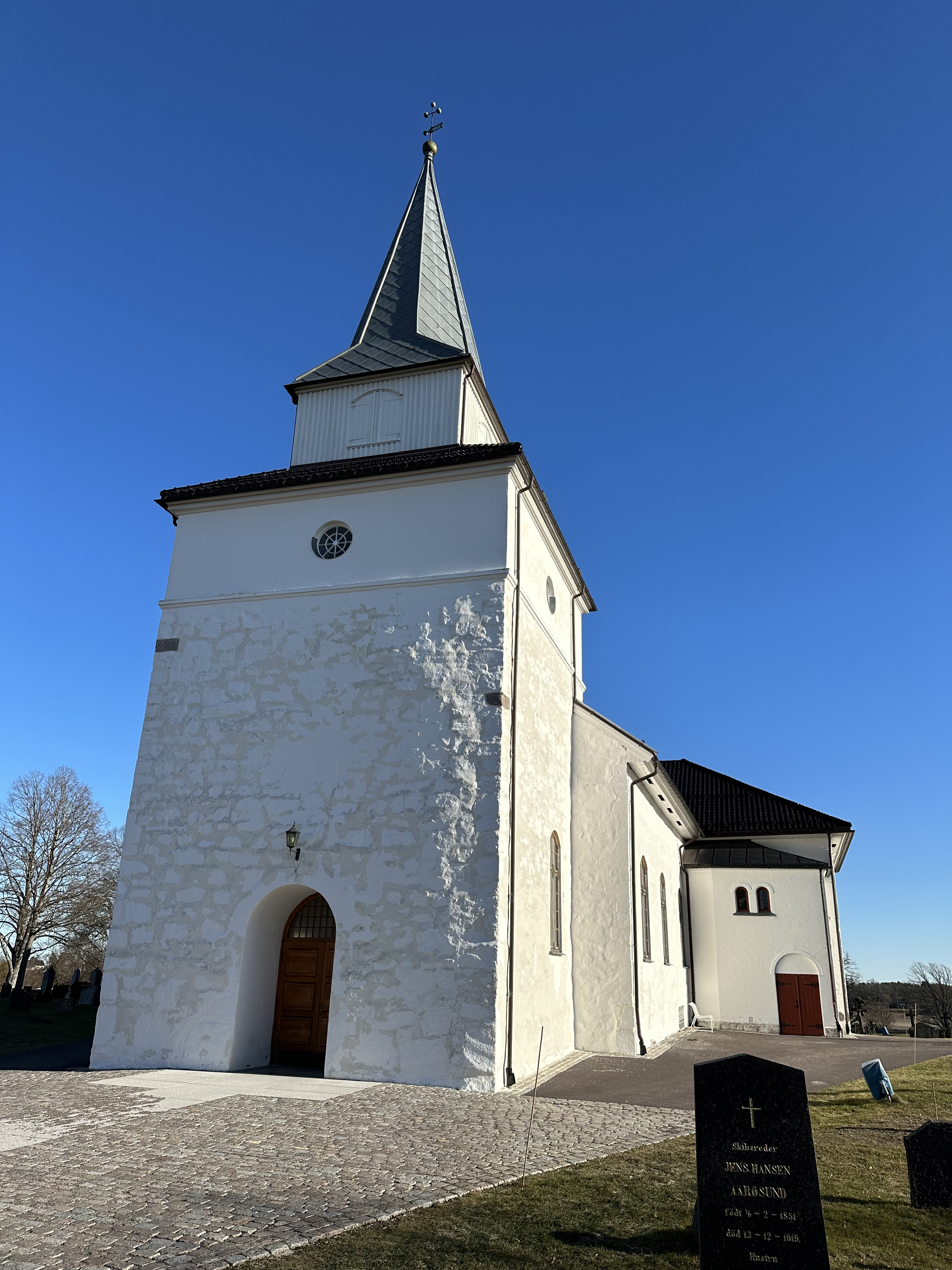

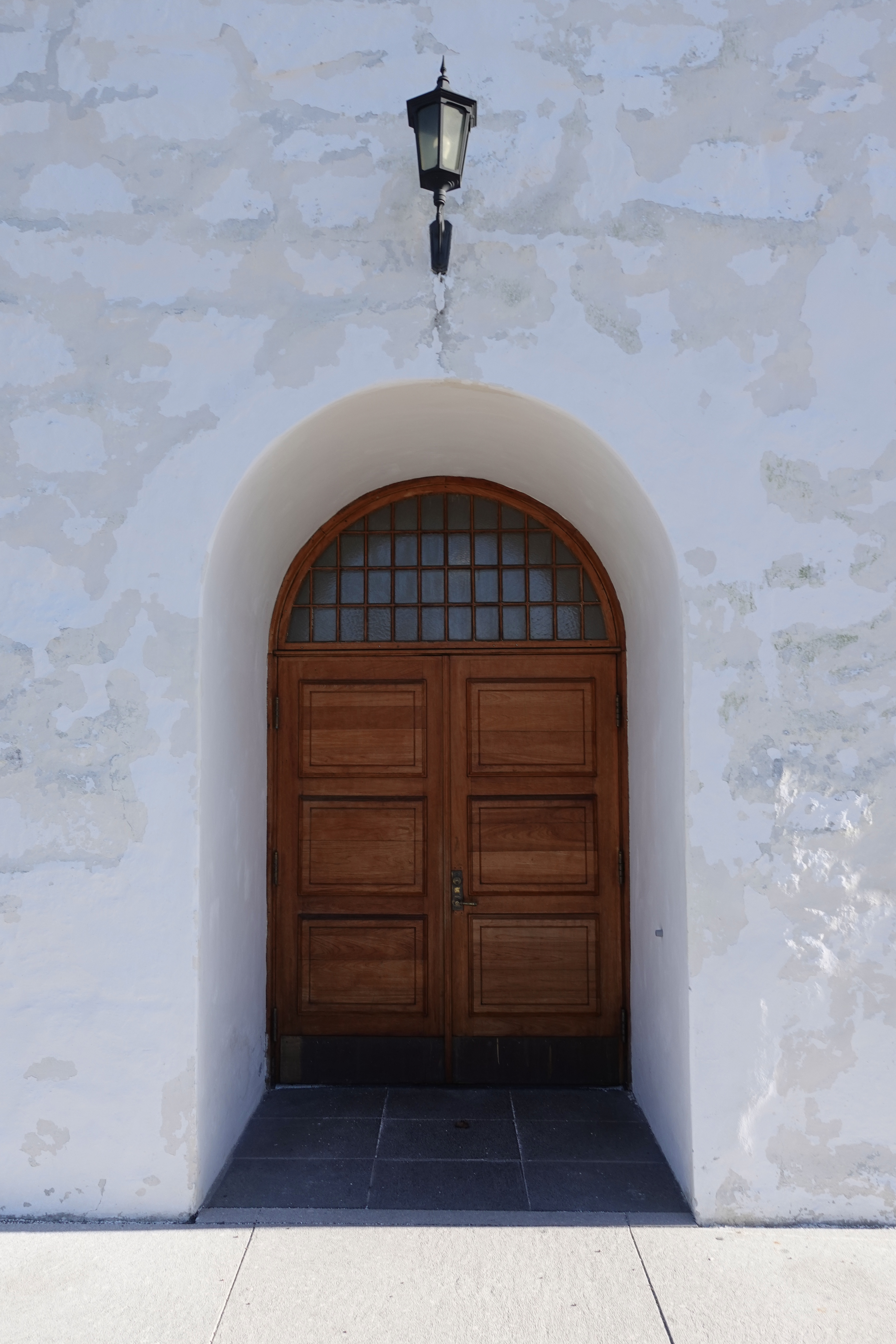

== See also ==
- List of churches in Tunsberg
