= Teie =

Village in Tønsberg, Norway

Teie Teige
- Village
- Interactive map of Teie
- Coordinates: 59.25149°N 10.41456°E
- Country: Norway
- Region: Eastern Norway
- County: Vestfold
- Municipality: Tønsberg/Færder
- Elevation: 29 m (95 ft)
- Time zone: UTC+01:00 (CET)
  - Summer (DST): UTC+02:00 (CEST)
- Post Code: 3127 Tønsberg

Teie is a village on the island of Nøtterøy in Vestfold county, Norway. The village is located within the city of Tønsberg and it straddles the border between Tønsberg Municipality and Færder Municipality.

The village area is located at the northern end of the island, near Vestskogen. The newspaper Øyene has been published in Teie since 1999.
