= Oslo (Storting constituency) =

Constituency of the Storting, the national legislature of Norway

- Constituency for the Storting
- Location of Oslo within Norway
- County: Oslo
- Population: 725,243 (2025)
- Electorate: 518,708 (2025)
- Area: 454 km^{2} (2025)

Current constituency
- Created: 1921
- Seats: List: 19 (2021–present); 18 (2013–2021); 16 (2005–2013); 15 (1973–2005); 13 (1953–1973); 7 (1921–1953)
- Members of the Storting: List: Grunde Almeland (V); Nikolai Astrup (H); Seher Aydar (R); Sunniva Holmås Eidsvoll (SV); Kamzy Gunaratnam (Ap); Arild Hermstad (MDG); Marian Hussein (SV); Frode Jacobsen (Ap); Mudassar Kapur (H); Ingrid Liland (MDG); Guri Melby (V); Bjørnar Moxnes (R); Farukh Qureshi (Ap); Ine Eriksen Søreide (H); Aina Stenersen (FrP); Trine Lise Sundnes (Ap); Mathilde Tybring-Gjedde (H); Simen Velle (FrP); Agnes Nærland Viljugrein (Ap); Tor Mikkel Wara (FrP)
- Created from: List: Gamle Aker; Grunerløkken; Hammersborg; Oslo City; Uranienborg

Oslo is one of the 19 multi-member constituencies of the Storting, the national legislature of Norway. The constituency was established as Kristiania in 1921 following the introduction of proportional representation for elections to the Storting. It was renamed Oslo from 1925. It is conterminous with the county of Oslo. The constituency currently elects 19 of the 169 members of the Storting using the open party-list proportional representation electoral system. At the 2025 parliamentary election it had 518,708 registered electors.

== Electoral system ==
Oslo currently elects 19 of the 169 members of the Storting using the open (Note: Although technically elections to the Storting have open lists, they are in effect closed lists as a majority of those voting for a party must make changes to the lists for the changes to take effect, which has never happened since the introduction of proportional representation in 1921, and as result candidates are elected in the order submitted by the party.) party-list proportional representation electoral system. Constituency seats are allocated by the County Electoral Committee using the Modified Sainte-Laguë method. Compensatory seats (seats at large or levelling seats) are calculated based on the national vote and are allocated by the National Electoral Committee using the Modified Sainte-Laguë method at the constituency level (one for each constituency). Only parties that reach the 4% national threshold compete for compensatory seats.

== Election results ==
=== Summary ===
Election	Communists K			Reds R / RV / FMS			Socialist Left SV / SF			Labour Ap			Greens MDG			Centre Sp / Bp / L			Liberals V			Christian Democrats KrF			Conservatives H			Progress FrP / ALP		
Election	Votes	%	Seats	Votes	%	Seats	Votes	%	Seats	Votes	%	Seats	Votes	%	Seats	Votes	%	Seats	Votes	%	Seats	Votes	%	Seats	Votes	%	Seats	Votes	%	Seats
2025				30,176	7.15%	1	45,181	10.71%	2	108,268	25.66%	5	43,326	10.27%	2	3,166	0.75%	0	30,643	7.26%	2	8,920	2.11%	0	78,043	18.50%	4	60,432	14.32%	3
2021	123	0.03%	0	31,352	8.26%	2	50,382	13.27%	3	87,158	22.96%	4	32,198	8.48%	2	11,953	3.15%	0	38,142	10.05%	2	6,922	1.82%	0	89,342	23.54%	5	22,784	6.00%	1
2017	119	0.03%	0	23,083	6.29%	1	34,052	9.28%	2	104,089	28.35%	5	21,853	5.95%	1	7,778	2.12%	0	30,933	8.43%	2	7,843	2.14%	0	97,085	26.45%	5	35,037	9.54%	2
2013	143	0.04%	0	11,133	3.19%	0	21,924	6.29%	1	106,001	30.41%	6	19,356	5.55%	1	2,963	0.85%	0	28,619	8.21%	2	9,850	2.83%	0	103,834	29.79%	6	40,660	11.67%	2
2009	115	0.04%	0	12,917	4.00%	0	33,205	10.28%	2	113,103	35.00%	6	1,828	0.57%	0	3,126	0.97%	0	20,784	6.43%	1	8,786	2.72%	0	69,999	21.66%	4	56,953	17.63%	3
2005	141	0.05%	0	9,277	3.00%	0	41,434	13.42%	2	97,246	31.49%	6	668	0.22%	0	3,270	1.06%	0	28,639	9.27%	2	11,168	3.62%	0	61,130	19.79%	3	53,280	17.25%	3
2001	189	0.07%	0	8,574	2.97%	0	48,800	16.89%	3	64,768	22.41%	3	661	0.23%	0	1,988	0.69%	0	17,139	5.93%	1	17,536	6.07%	1	83,979	29.06%	5	37,564	13.00%	2
1997	184	0.06%	0	11,766	3.99%	0	25,954	8.81%	1	98,340	33.37%	6	1,302	0.44%	0	3,774	1.28%	0	12,460	4.23%	0	20,083	6.82%	1	63,980	21.71%	4	52,828	17.93%	3
1993				14,266	5.14%	1	19,873	7.16%	1	101,598	36.60%	6	656	0.24%	0	12,175	4.39%	1	9,518	3.43%	0	9,862	3.55%	0	76,117	27.42%	5	23,129	8.33%	1
1989				7,543	2.51%	0	34,882	11.62%	2	89,414	29.77%	5	1,727	0.58%	0	2,189	0.73%	0	7,963	2.65%	0	11,414	3.80%	0	95,679	31.86%	5	44,920	14.96%	3
1985	600	0.20%	0	5,275	1.73%	0	21,533	7.05%	1	103,811	33.98%	5				2,550	0.83%	0	8,487	2.78%	0	12,358	4.05%	1	131,269	42.97%	7	15,579	5.10%	1
1981	1,133	0.37%	0	5,322	1.73%	0	20,662	6.73%	1	101,135	32.96%	5				1,999	0.65%	0	8,473	2.76%	0	14,669	4.78%	1	129,967	42.36%	7	21,383	6.97%	1
1977	1,234	0.42%	0	4,368	1.47%	0	16,869	5.69%	1	118,684	40.02%	7							7,097	2.39%	0	25,646	8.65%	1	115,607	38.98%	6	5,911	1.99%	0
1973				2,558	0.88%	0	39,434	13.55%	2	97,707	33.57%	6							10,413	3.58%	0	21,621	7.43%	1	87,700	30.13%	5	18,578	6.38%	1
1969	3,899	1.26%	0				14,619	4.73%	0	137,676	44.50%	6							18,419	5.95%	1	22,633	7.32%	1	112,130	36.24%	5			
1965	4,523	1.48%	0				23,930	7.82%	1	122,953	40.17%	6							20,704	6.76%	1	15,566	5.08%	0	118,279	38.64%	5			
1961	7,481	2.60%	0				18,117	6.30%	1	123,136	42.81%	6							12,811	4.45%	0	15,258	5.30%	1	110,862	38.54%	5			
1957	11,407	4.09%	0							129,456	46.47%	6							16,039	5.76%	1	15,054	5.40%	1	106,385	38.19%	5			
1953	17,639	6.34%	1							119,784	43.02%	5							18,195	6.54%	1	16,961	6.09%	1	105,817	38.01%	5			
1949	21,535	7.83%	0							119,741	43.53%	4							19,017	6.91%	0	14,792	5.38%	0	99,179	36.05%	3			
1945	28,301	16.56%	1							68,670	40.18%	4							6,389	3.74%	0	16,456	9.63%	0	51,084	29.89%	2			
1936										86,345	51.27%	4							4,475	2.66%	0				69,258	41.12%	3			
1933	1,008	0.67%	0							73,601	49.13%	4				1,193	0.80%	0	5,460	3.64%	0				60,297	40.25%	3			
1930	610	0.43%	0							58,813	41.79%	3				1,158	0.82%	0	3,677	2.61%	0				72,362	51.42%	4			
1927	1,360	1.06%	0							62,168	48.31%	4							3,748	2.91%	0				60,207	46.78%	3			
1924	2,564	2.01%	0							45,200	35.48%	3							2,070	1.63%	0				67,216	52.77%	4			
1921										34,553	31.18%	2							3,207	2.89%	0				61,524	55.51%	5			

(Excludes compensatory seats. Figures in italics represent joint lists.)

=== Detailed ===
==== 2020s ====
===== 2025 =====
Results of the 2025 parliamentary election held on 8 September 2025:

Party		Votes	%	Seats		
Party		Votes	%	Con.	Com.	Tot.
Labour Party	Ap	108,268	25.66%	5	0	5
Conservative Party	H	78,043	18.50%	4	0	4
Progress Party	FrP	60,432	14.32%	3	0	3
Socialist Left Party	SV	45,181	10.71%	2	0	2
Green Party	MDG	43,326	10.27%	2	0	2
Liberal Party	V	30,643	7.26%	2	0	2
Red Party	R	30,176	7.15%	1	1	2
Christian Democratic Party	KrF	8,920	2.11%	0	0	0
Centre Party	Sp	3,166	0.75%	0	0	0
Save Ullevål Hospital	RUS	2,361	0.56%	0	0	0
Peace and Justice	FOR	2,063	0.49%	0	0	0
Norway Democrats	ND	1,828	0.43%	0	0	0
Generation Party	GP	1,721	0.41%	0	0	0
Pensioners' Party	PP	1,589	0.38%	0	0	0
Center Party	PS	1,295	0.31%	0	0	0
Industry and Business Party	INP	802	0.19%	0	0	0
Loneliness Party	ENS	712	0.17%	0	0	0
Conservative	K	704	0.17%	0	0	0
Welfare and Innovation Party	VIP	486	0.12%	0	0	0
DNI Party	DNI	202	0.05%	0	0	0
Valid votes		421,918	100.00%	19	1	20
Blank votes		2,118	0.50%			
Rejected votes – other		436	0.10%			
Total polled		424,472	81.83%			
Registered electors		518,708				

The following candidates were elected:

- Constituency seats - Grunde Almeland (V); Nikolai Astrup (H); Seher Aydar (R); Sunniva Holmås Eidsvoll (SV); Kamzy Gunaratnam (Ap); Arild Hermstad (MDG); Marian Hussein (SV); Frode Jacobsen (Ap); Mudassar Kapur (H); Ingrid Liland (MDG); Guri Melby (V); Ine Eriksen Søreide (H); Aina Stenersen (FrP); Jonas Gahr Støre (Ap); Mathilde Tybring-Gjedde (H); Simen Velle (FrP); Jan Christian Vestre (Ap); Agnes Nærland Viljugrein (Ap); and Tor Mikkel Wara (FrP).
- Compensatory seat - Bjørnar Moxnes (R).

===== 2021 =====
Results of the 2021 parliamentary election held on 13 September 2021:

Party		Votes	%	Seats		
Party		Votes	%	Con.	Com.	Tot.
Conservative Party	H	89,342	23.54%	5	0	5
Labour Party	Ap	87,158	22.96%	4	0	4
Socialist Left Party	SV	50,382	13.27%	3	0	3
Liberal Party	V	38,142	10.05%	2	1	3
Green Party	MDG	32,198	8.48%	2	0	2
Red Party	R	31,352	8.26%	2	0	2
Progress Party	FrP	22,784	6.00%	1	0	1
Centre Party	Sp	11,953	3.15%	0	0	0
Christian Democratic Party	KrF	6,922	1.82%	0	0	0
Democrats in Norway		2,585	0.68%	0	0	0
Center Party		1,367	0.36%	0	0	0
Pensioners' Party	PP	1,312	0.35%	0	0	0
People's Action No to More Road Tolls	FNB	1,072	0.28%	0	0	0
Capitalist Party		665	0.18%	0	0	0
Health Party		593	0.16%	0	0	0
The Christians	PDK	474	0.12%	0	0	0
Pirate Party of Norway		336	0.09%	0	0	0
Feminist Initiative	FI	275	0.07%	0	0	0
Industry and Business Party	INP	234	0.06%	0	0	0
Alliance - Alternative for Norway		232	0.06%	0	0	0
Communist Party of Norway	K	123	0.03%	0	0	0
Coastal Party	KP	64	0.02%	0	0	0
Valid votes		379,565	100.00%	19	1	20
Blank votes		1,682	0.44%			
Rejected votes – other		149	0.04%			
Total polled		381,396	78.53%			
Registered electors		485,656				

The following candidates were elected:

- Constituency seats - Nikolai Astrup (H); Seher Aydar (R); Lan Marie Berg (MDG); Espen Barth Eide (Ap); Ola Elvestuen (V); Kamzy Gunaratnam (Ap); Rasmus Hansson (MDG); Marian Hussein (SV); Kari Elisabeth Kaski (SV); Mudassar Kapur (H); Heidi Nordby Lunde (H); Guri Melby (V); Bjørnar Moxnes (R); Ine Eriksen Søreide (H); Jonas Gahr Støre (Ap); Trine Lise Sundnes (Ap); Christian Tybring-Gjedde (FrP); Mathilde Tybring-Gjedde (H); and Andreas Sjalg Unneland (SV).
- Compensatory seat - Grunde Almeland (V).

==== 2010s ====
===== 2017 =====
Results of the 2017 parliamentary election held on 11 September 2017:

Party		Votes	%	Seats		
Party		Votes	%	Con.	Com.	Tot.
Labour Party	Ap	104,089	28.35%	5	0	5
Conservative Party	H	97,085	26.45%	5	1	6
Progress Party	FrP	35,037	9.54%	2	0	2
Socialist Left Party	SV	34,052	9.28%	2	0	2
Liberal Party	V	30,933	8.43%	2	0	2
Red Party	R	23,083	6.29%	1	0	1
Green Party	MDG	21,853	5.95%	1	0	1
Christian Democratic Party	KrF	7,843	2.14%	0	0	0
Centre Party	Sp	7,778	2.12%	0	0	0
Pensioners' Party	PP	1,335	0.36%	0	0	0
Health Party		1,184	0.32%	0	0	0
Capitalist Party		667	0.18%	0	0	0
Pirate Party of Norway		630	0.17%	0	0	0
The Christians	PDK	343	0.09%	0	0	0
Democrats in Norway		326	0.09%	0	0	0
Feminist Initiative	FI	326	0.09%	0	0	0
The Alliance		314	0.09%	0	0	0
Communist Party of Norway	K	119	0.03%	0	0	0
Society Party		104	0.03%	0	0	0
Valid votes		367,101	100.00%	18	1	19
Blank votes		1,727	0.47%			
Rejected votes – other		273	0.07%			
Total polled		369,101	80.22%			
Registered electors		460,108				

The following candidates were elected:

- Constituency seats - Nikolai Astrup (H); Une Aina Bastholm (MDG); Jan Bøhler (Ap); Espen Barth Eide (Ap); Petter Eide (SV); Ola Elvestuen (V); Trine Skei Grande (V); Siv Jensen (FrP); Mudassar Kapur (H); Kari Elisabeth Kaski (SV); Heidi Nordby Lunde (H); Marianne Marthinsen (Ap); Bjørnar Moxnes (R); Siri Staalesen (Ap); Ine Eriksen Søreide (H); Jonas Gahr Støre (Ap); Michael Tetzschner (H); and Christian Tybring-Gjedde (FrP).
- Compensatory seat - Stefan Heggelund (H).

===== 2013 =====
Results of the 2013 parliamentary election held on 8 and 9 September 2013:

Party		Votes	%	Seats		
Party		Votes	%	Con.	Com.	Tot.
Labour Party	Ap	106,001	30.41%	6	0	6
Conservative Party	H	103,834	29.79%	6	0	6
Progress Party	FrP	40,660	11.67%	2	0	2
Liberal Party	V	28,619	8.21%	2	0	2
Socialist Left Party	SV	21,924	6.29%	1	0	1
Green Party	MDG	19,356	5.55%	1	0	1
Red Party	R	11,133	3.19%	0	0	0
Christian Democratic Party	KrF	9,850	2.83%	0	1	1
Centre Party	Sp	2,963	0.85%	0	0	0
Pirate Party of Norway		1,357	0.39%	0	0	0
Pensioners' Party	PP	1,172	0.34%	0	0	0
The Christians	PDK	734	0.21%	0	0	0
Liberal People's Party	DLF	267	0.08%	0	0	0
Democrats in Norway		236	0.07%	0	0	0
Communist Party of Norway	K	143	0.04%	0	0	0
Coastal Party	KP	126	0.04%	0	0	0
Christian Unity Party	KSP	97	0.03%	0	0	0
Society Party		70	0.02%	0	0	0
Valid votes		348,542	100.00%	18	1	19
Blank votes		1,299	0.37%			
Rejected votes – other		83	0.02%			
Total polled		349,924	80.30%			
Registered electors		435,787				

The following candidates were elected:

- Constituency seats - Nikolai Astrup (H); Jan Bøhler (Ap); Ola Elvestuen (V); Trine Skei Grande (V); Rasmus Hansson (MDG); Stefan Heggelund (H); Heikki Holmås (SV); Siv Jensen (FrP); Mudassar Kapur (H); Marianne Marthinsen (Ap); Marit Nybakk (Ap); Ine Eriksen Søreide (H); Jens Stoltenberg (Ap); Jonas Gahr Støre (Ap); Hadia Tajik (Ap); Michael Tetzschner (H); Christian Tybring-Gjedde (FrP); and Kristin Vinje (H).
- Compensatory seat - Hans Olav Syversen (KrF).

==== 2000s ====
===== 2009 =====
Results of the 2009 parliamentary election held on 13 and 14 September 2009:

Party		Votes	%	Seats		
Party		Votes	%	Con.	Com.	Tot.
Labour Party	Ap	113,103	35.00%	6	0	6
Conservative Party	H	69,999	21.66%	4	0	4
Progress Party	FrP	56,953	17.63%	3	0	3
Socialist Left Party	SV	33,205	10.28%	2	0	2
Liberal Party	V	20,784	6.43%	1	0	1
Red Party	R	12,917	4.00%	0	0	0
Christian Democratic Party	KrF	8,786	2.72%	0	1	1
Centre Party	Sp	3,126	0.97%	0	0	0
Green Party	MDG	1,828	0.57%	0	0	0
Pensioners' Party	PP	1,146	0.35%	0	0	0
Christian Unity Party	KSP	292	0.09%	0	0	0
Contemporary Party		264	0.08%	0	0	0
Liberal People's Party	DLF	170	0.05%	0	0	0
Democrats in Norway		157	0.05%	0	0	0
Coastal Party	KP	145	0.04%	0	0	0
Communist Party of Norway	K	115	0.04%	0	0	0
Society Party		72	0.02%	0	0	0
Norwegian Republican Alliance		54	0.02%	0	0	0
Valid votes		323,116	100.00%	16	1	17
Blank votes		1,102	0.34%			
Rejected votes – other		132	0.04%			
Total polled		324,350	77.94%			
Registered electors		416,168				

The following candidates were elected:

- Constituency seats - Nikolai Astrup (H); Jan Bøhler (Ap); Per-Kristian Foss (H); Trine Skei Grande (V); Kristin Halvorsen (SV); Heikki Holmås (SV); Siv Jensen (FrP); Marianne Marthinsen (Ap); Peter N. Myhre (FrP); Marit Nybakk (Ap); Ine Eriksen Søreide (H); Jens Stoltenberg (Ap); Jonas Gahr Støre (Ap); Hadia Tajik (Ap); Michael Tetzschner (H); and Christian Tybring-Gjedde (FrP).
- Compensatory seat - Hans Olav Syversen (KrF).

===== 2005 =====
Results of the 2005 parliamentary election held on 11 and 12 September 2005:

Party		Votes	%	Seats		
Party		Votes	%	Con.	Com.	Tot.
Labour Party	Ap	97,246	31.49%	6	0	6
Conservative Party	H	61,130	19.79%	3	0	3
Progress Party	FrP	53,280	17.25%	3	0	3
Socialist Left Party	SV	41,434	13.42%	2	0	2
Liberal Party	V	28,639	9.27%	2	0	2
Christian Democratic Party	KrF	11,168	3.62%	0	1	1
Red Electoral Alliance	RV	9,277	3.00%	0	0	0
Centre Party	Sp	3,270	1.06%	0	0	0
Pensioners' Party	PP	1,346	0.44%	0	0	0
Green Party	MDG	668	0.22%	0	0	0
Coastal Party	KP	551	0.18%	0	0	0
Democrats		248	0.08%	0	0	0
Abortion Opponents' List		215	0.07%	0	0	0
Communist Party of Norway	K	141	0.05%	0	0	0
Christian Unity Party	KSP	117	0.04%	0	0	0
Liberal People's Party	DLF	104	0.03%	0	0	0
Valid votes		308,834	100.00%	16	1	17
Blank votes		942	0.30%			
Rejected votes – other		103	0.03%			
Total polled		309,879	78.66%			
Registered electors		393,937				

The following candidates were elected:

- Constituency seats - Jan Bøhler (Ap); Odd Einar Dørum (V); Per-Kristian Foss (H); Trine Skei Grande (V); Carl I. Hagen (FrP); Kristin Halvorsen (SV); Britt Hildeng (Ap); Heikki Holmås (SV); Siv Jensen (FrP); Saera Khan (Ap); Inge Lønning (H); Marianne Marthinsen (Ap); Marit Nybakk (Ap); Ine Eriksen Søreide (H); Jens Stoltenberg (Ap); and Christian Tybring-Gjedde (FrP).
- Compensatory seat - Hans Olav Syversen (KrF).

===== 2001 =====
Results of the 2001 parliamentary election held on 9 and 10 September 2001:

Party		Votes	%	Seats		
Party		Votes	%	Con.	Com.	Tot.
Conservative Party	H	83,979	29.06%	5	0	5
Labour Party	Ap	64,768	22.41%	3	1	4
Socialist Left Party	SV	48,800	16.89%	3	0	3
Progress Party	FrP	37,564	13.00%	2	0	2
Christian Democratic Party	KrF	17,536	6.07%	1	0	1
Liberal Party	V	17,139	5.93%	1	0	1
Red Electoral Alliance	RV	8,574	2.97%	0	0	0
The Political Party	DPP	3,719	1.29%	0	0	0
Centre Party	Sp	1,988	0.69%	0	0	0
Pensioners' Party	PP	1,811	0.63%	0	0	0
Coastal Party	KP	902	0.31%	0	0	0
Green Party	MDG	661	0.23%	0	0	0
County Lists		396	0.14%	0	0	0
Christian Unity Party	KSP	213	0.07%	0	0	0
Communist Party of Norway	K	189	0.07%	0	0	0
Fatherland Party	FLP	159	0.06%	0	0	0
Justice Party		138	0.05%	0	0	0
Norwegian People's Party	NFP	103	0.04%	0	0	0
Natural Law Party		87	0.03%	0	0	0
Non-Partisan Coastal and Rural District Party		73	0.03%	0	0	0
Society Party		66	0.02%	0	0	0
Social Democrats		55	0.02%	0	0	0
Liberal People's Party	DLF	40	0.01%	0	0	0
Valid votes		288,960	100.00%	15	1	16
Rejected votes		1,414	0.49%			
Total polled		290,374	75.94%			
Registered electors		382,354				

The following candidates were elected:

- Constituency seats - Kristin Krohn Devold (H); Odd Einar Dørum (V); Per-Kristian Foss (H); Bjørgulv Froyn (Ap); Carl I. Hagen (FrP); Kristin Halvorsen (SV); Heikki Holmås (SV); Siv Jensen (FrP); Heidi Larssen (H); Inge Lønning (H); Marit Nybakk (Ap); Afshan Rafiq (H); Lars Rise (KrF); Heidi Sørensen (SV); and Jens Stoltenberg (Ap).
- Compensatory seat - Britt Hildeng (Ap).

==== 1990s ====
===== 1997 =====
Results of the 1997 parliamentary election held on 15 September 1997:

Party		Votes	%	Seats		
Party		Votes	%	Con.	Com.	Tot.
Labour Party	Ap	98,340	33.37%	6	0	6
Conservative Party	H	63,980	21.71%	4	0	4
Progress Party	FrP	52,828	17.93%	3	0	3
Socialist Left Party	SV	25,954	8.81%	1	1	2
Christian Democratic Party	KrF	20,083	6.82%	1	0	1
Liberal Party	V	12,460	4.23%	0	1	1
Red Electoral Alliance	RV	11,766	3.99%	0	0	0
Centre Party	Sp	3,774	1.28%	0	0	0
Pensioners' Party	PP	2,729	0.93%	0	0	0
Green Party	MDG	1,302	0.44%	0	0	0
Fatherland Party	FLP	360	0.12%	0	0	0
Justice Party		281	0.10%	0	0	0
Natural Law Party		230	0.08%	0	0	0
Communist Party of Norway	K	184	0.06%	0	0	0
White Electoral Alliance		171	0.06%	0	0	0
Society Party		125	0.04%	0	0	0
Liberal People's Party	DLF	56	0.02%	0	0	0
Non-Partisan Deputies	TVF	45	0.02%	0	0	0
Valid votes		294,668	100.00%	15	2	17
Rejected votes		1,588	0.54%			
Total polled		296,256	79.24%			
Registered electors		373,860				

The following candidates were elected:

- Constituency seats - Dag Danielsen (FrP); Kristin Krohn Devold (H); Per-Kristian Foss (H); Bjørn Tore Godal (Ap); Carl I. Hagen (FrP); Kristin Halvorsen (SV); Britt Hildeng (Ap); Annelise Høegh (H); Inger Lise Husøy (Ap); Siv Jensen (FrP); Rune E. Kristiansen (Ap); Inge Lønning (H); Marit Nybakk (Ap); Lars Rise (KrF); and Jens Stoltenberg (Ap).
- Compensatory seats - Odd Einar Dørum (V); and Erik Solheim (SV).

===== 1993 =====
Results of the 1993 parliamentary election held on 12 and 13 September 1993:

Party		Votes	%	Seats		
Party		Votes	%	Con.	Com.	Tot.
Labour Party	Ap	101,598	36.60%	6	0	6
Conservative Party	H	76,117	27.42%	5	0	5
Progress Party	FrP	23,129	8.33%	1	1	2
Socialist Left Party	SV	19,873	7.16%	1	1	2
Red Electoral Alliance	RV	14,266	5.14%	1	0	1
Centre Party	Sp	12,175	4.39%	1	0	1
Christian Democratic Party	KrF	9,862	3.55%	0	0	0
Liberal Party	V	9,518	3.43%	0	0	0
Pensioners' Party	PP	5,008	1.80%	0	0	0
Stop Immigration/Help the immigrants		1,828	0.66%	0	0	0
Society Party		1,468	0.53%	0	0	0
Fatherland Party	FLP	1,279	0.46%	0	0	0
Green Party	MDG	656	0.24%	0	0	0
Natural Law Party		375	0.14%	0	0	0
Freedom Party against the EU		151	0.05%	0	0	0
Liberal People's Party	DLF	143	0.05%	0	0	0
New Future Coalition Party	SNF	95	0.03%	0	0	0
Common Future		52	0.02%	0	0	0
Valid votes		277,593	100.00%	15	2	17
Rejected votes		1,660	0.59%			
Total polled		279,253	77.77%			
Registered electors		359,085				

The following candidates were elected:

- Constituency seats - Thorbjørn Berntsen (Ap); Gro Harlem Brundtland (Ap); Kristin Krohn Devold (H); Grete Faremo (Ap); Erling Folkvord (RV); Per-Kristian Foss (H); Bjørn Tore Godal (Ap); Carl I. Hagen (FrP); Arne Haukvik (Sp); Annelise Høegh (H); Marit Nybakk (Ap); Anders C. Sjaastad (H); Erik Solheim (SV); Jens Stoltenberg (Ap); and Jan P. Syse (H).
- Compensatory seats - Ellen Christine Christiansen (FrP); and Kristin Halvorsen (SV).

==== 1980s ====
===== 1989 =====
Results of the 1989 parliamentary election held on 10 and 11 September 1989:

Party		Votes	%	Seats		
Party		Votes	%	Con.	Com.	Tot.
Conservative Party	H	95,679	31.86%	5	0	5
Labour Party	Ap	89,414	29.77%	5	0	5
Progress Party	FrP	44,920	14.96%	3	0	3
Socialist Left Party	SV	34,882	11.62%	2	0	2
Christian Democratic Party	KrF	11,414	3.80%	0	1	1
Liberal Party	V	7,963	2.65%	0	0	0
County Lists for Environment and Solidarity	FMS	7,543	2.51%	0	0	0
Stop Immigration	SI	2,636	0.88%	0	0	0
Centre Party	Sp	2,189	0.73%	0	0	0
Pensioners' Party	PP	1,770	0.59%	0	0	0
Green Party	MDG	1,727	0.58%	0	0	0
Liberals-Europe Party		110	0.04%	0	0	0
Free Elected Representatives		52	0.02%	0	0	0
Valid votes		300,299	100.00%	15	1	16
Rejected votes		903	0.30%			
Total polled		301,202	84.91%			
Registered electors		354,750				

The following candidates were elected:

- Constituency seats - Thorbjørn Berntsen (Ap); Gro Harlem Brundtland (Ap); Kristin Clemet (H); Per-Kristian Foss (H); Bjørn Tore Godal (Ap); Carl I. Hagen (FrP); Kristin Halvorsen (SV); Annelise Høegh (H); Theo Koritzinsky (SV); Marit Nybakk (Ap); Sissel Rønbeck (Ap); Anders C. Sjaastad (H); Pål Atle Skjervengen (FrP); Jan P. Syse (H); and Tor Mikkel Wara (FrP).
- Compensatory seat - Eleonore Bjartveit (KrF).

===== 1985 =====
Results of the 1985 parliamentary election held on 8 and 9 September 1985:

Party		Party			List Alliance		
Party		Votes	%	Seats	Votes	%	Seats
Conservative Party	H	131,269	42.97%	7	131,269	43.00%	7
Labour Party	Ap	103,811	33.98%	6	103,811	34.01%	5
Socialist Left Party	SV	21,533	7.05%	1	21,533	7.05%	1
Christian Democratic Party	KrF	12,358	4.05%	0	17,036	5.58%	1
Centre Party	Sp	2,550	0.83%	0	17,036	5.58%	1
Liberal People's Party	DLF	2,360	0.77%	0	17,036	5.58%	1
Progress Party	FrP	15,579	5.10%	1	15,579	5.10%	1
Liberal Party	V	8,487	2.78%	0	8,487	2.78%	0
Red Electoral Alliance	RV	5,275	1.73%	0	5,275	1.73%	0
Pensioners' Party	PP	1,419	0.46%	0	1,419	0.46%	0
Communist Party of Norway	K	600	0.20%	0	600	0.20%	0
Free Elected Representatives		240	0.08%	0	240	0.08%	0
Valid votes		305,481	100.00%	15	305,249	100.00%	15
Rejected votes		536	0.18%				
Total polled		306,017	85.84%				
Registered electors		356,491					

As the list alliance was entitled to more seats contesting as an alliance than it was contesting as individual parties, the distribution of seats was as list alliance votes. The KrF-Sp-DLF list alliance's seat was allocated to the Christian Democratic Party.

The following candidates were elected: Thorbjørn Berntsen (Ap); Gro Harlem Brundtland (Ap); Einar Førde (Ap); Per-Kristian Foss (H); Knut Frydenlund (Ap); Carl I. Hagen (FrP); Astrid Nøklebye Heiberg (H); Annelise Høegh (H); Theo Koritzinsky (SV); Kåre Kristiansen (KrF); Lars Roar Langslet (H); Sissel Rønbeck (Ap); Anders C. Sjaastad (H); Jan P. Syse (H); and Kåre Willoch (H).

===== 1981 =====
Results of the 1981 parliamentary election held on 13 and 14 September 1981:

Party		Votes	%	Seats
Conservative Party	H	129,967	42.36%	7
Labour Party	Ap	101,135	32.96%	5
Progress Party	FrP	21,383	6.97%	1
Socialist Left Party	SV	20,662	6.73%	1
Christian Democratic Party	KrF	14,669	4.78%	1
Liberal Party	V	8,473	2.76%	0
Red Electoral Alliance	RV	5,322	1.73%	0
Centre Party	Sp	1,999	0.65%	0
Communist Party of Norway	K	1,133	0.37%	0
Liberal People's Party	DLF	1,044	0.34%	0
Tom A. Schanke's Party		826	0.27%	0
Plebiscite Party		149	0.05%	0
Free Elected Representatives		63	0.02%	0
Valid votes		306,825	100.00%	15
Rejected votes		640	0.21%	
Total polled		307,465	85.51%	
Registered electors		359,577		

The following candidates were elected: Thorbjørn Berntsen (Ap); Gro Harlem Brundtland (Ap); Per Ditlev-Simonsen (H); Per-Kristian Foss (H); Knut Frydenlund (Ap); Carl I. Hagen (FrP); Kåre Kristiansen (KrF); Lars Roar Langslet (H); Wenche Lowzow (H); Stein Ørnhøi (SV); Sissel Rønbeck (Ap); Reiulf Steen (Ap); Jan P. Syse (H); Grethe Værnø (H); and Kåre Willoch (H).

==== 1970s ====
===== 1977 =====
Results of the 1977 parliamentary election held on 11 and 12 September 1977:

Party		Votes	%	Seats
Labour Party	Ap	118,684	40.02%	7
Conservative Party	H	115,607	38.98%	6
Christian Democratic Party-Centre Party-New People's Party	KrF-Sp-DNF	25,646	8.65%	1
Socialist Left Party	SV	16,869	5.69%	1
Liberal Party	V	7,097	2.39%	0
Progress Party	FrP	5,911	1.99%	0
Red Electoral Alliance	RV	4,368	1.47%	0
Communist Party of Norway	K	1,234	0.42%	0
Single Person's Party		835	0.28%	0
Free Elected Representatives		171	0.06%	0
Norwegian Democratic Party		146	0.05%	0
Valid votes		296,568	100.00%	15
Rejected votes		532	0.18%	
Total polled		297,100	84.49%	
Registered electors		351,642		

The following candidates were elected: Thorbjørn Berntsen (Ap); Trygve Bratteli (Ap); Gro Harlem Brundtland (Ap); Einar Førde (Ap); Knut Frydenlund (Ap); Karin Hafstad (H); Haldis Havrøy (Ap); Kåre Kristiansen (KrF); Lars Roar Langslet (H); Wenche Lowzow (H); Stein Ørnhøi (SV); Reiulf Steen (Ap); Jan P. Syse (H); Paul Thyness (H); and Kåre Willoch (H).

===== 1973 =====
Results of the 1973 parliamentary election held on 9 and 10 September 1973:

Party		Votes	%	Seats
Labour Party	Ap	97,707	33.57%	6
Conservative Party	H	87,700	30.13%	5
Socialist Electoral League	SV	39,434	13.55%	2
Christian Democratic Party	KrF	21,621	7.43%	1
Anders Lange's Party	ALP	18,578	6.38%	1
New People's Party	DNF	10,941	3.76%	0
Liberal Party-Centre Party	V-Sp	10,413	3.58%	0
Red Electoral Alliance	RV	2,558	0.88%	0
Single Person's Party		1,987	0.68%	0
Norwegian Democratic Party		85	0.03%	0
Other		2	0.00%	0
Valid votes		291,026	100.00%	15
Rejected votes		545	0.19%	
Total polled		291,571	82.19%	
Registered electors		354,757		

The following candidates were elected: Berit Ås (SV); Trygve Bratteli (Ap); Einar Førde (Ap); Knut Frydenlund (Ap); Finn Gustavsen (SV); Karin Hafstad (H); Haldis Havrøy (Ap); Kåre Kristiansen (KrF); Anders Lange (ALP); Lars Roar Langslet (H); Gunnar Alf Larsen (Ap); Aase Lionæs (Ap); Jan P. Syse (H); Paul Thyness (H); and Kåre Willoch (H).

==== 1960s ====
===== 1969 =====
Results of the 1969 parliamentary election held on 7 and 8 September 1969:

Party		Votes	%	Seats
Labour Party	Ap	137,676	44.50%	6
Conservative Party	H	112,130	36.24%	5
Christian Democratic Party	KrF	22,633	7.32%	1
Liberal Party	V	18,419	5.95%	1
Socialist People's Party	SF	14,619	4.73%	0
Communist Party of Norway	K	3,899	1.26%	0
Wild Votes		2	0.00%	0
Valid votes		309,378	100.00%	13
Rejected votes		319	0.10%	
Total polled		309,697	85.57%	
Registered electors		361,912		

The following candidates were elected: Egil Aarvik (KrF); Trygve Bratteli (Ap); Einar Førde (Ap); Knut Frydenlund (Ap); Lars Roar Langslet (H); Gunnar Alf Larsen (Ap); Aase Lionæs (Ap); Erling Petersen (H); Tove Pihl (Ap); Berte Rognerud (H); Helge Seip (V); Paul Thyness (H); and Kåre Willoch (H).

===== 1965 =====
Results of the 1965 parliamentary election held on 12 and 13 September 1965:

Party		Votes	%	Seats
Labour Party	Ap	122,953	40.17%	6
Conservative Party	H	118,279	38.64%	5
Socialist People's Party	SF	23,930	7.82%	1
Liberal Party	V	20,704	6.76%	1
Christian Democratic Party	KrF	15,566	5.08%	0
Communist Party of Norway	K	4,523	1.48%	0
Freedom Protectors		163	0.05%	0
Valid votes		306,118	100.00%	13
Rejected votes		1,397	0.45%	
Total polled		307,515	88.18%	
Registered electors		348,716		

The following candidates were elected: Trygve Bratteli (Ap); Reidar Bruu (H); Einar Gerhardsen (Ap); Finn Gustavsen (SF); Gunnar Alf Larsen (Ap); Aase Lionæs (Ap); Finn Moe (Ap); Erling Petersen (H); Berte Rognerud (H); Helge Seip (V); Rakel Seweriin (Ap); Paul Thyness (H); and Kåre Willoch (H).

===== 1961 =====
Results of the 1961 parliamentary election held on 11 September 1961:

Party		Votes	%	Seats
Labour Party	Ap	123,136	42.81%	6
Conservative Party	H	110,862	38.54%	5
Socialist People's Party	SF	18,117	6.30%	1
Christian Democratic Party	KrF	15,258	5.30%	1
Liberal Party	V	12,811	4.45%	0
Communist Party of Norway	K	7,481	2.60%	0
Valid votes		287,665	100.00%	13
Rejected votes		1,469	0.51%	
Total polled		289,134	83.49%	
Registered electors		346,310		

The following candidates were elected: Egil Aarvik (KrF), 15,257 votes; Trygve Bratteli (Ap), 123,135 votes; Reidar Bruu (H), 110,839 votes; Einar Gerhardsen (Ap), 123,126 votes; Finn Gustavsen (SF), 18,117 votes; Aase Lionæs (Ap), 123,129 votes; Per Lønning (H), 110,846 votes; Finn Moe (Ap), 123,134 votes; Konrad Nordahl (Ap), 123,116 votes; Erling Petersen (H), 110,840 votes; Berte Rognerud (H), 110,843 votes; Rakel Seweriin (Ap), 123,129 votes; and Kåre Willoch (H), 110,850 votes.

==== 1950s ====
===== 1957 =====
Results of the 1957 parliamentary election held on 7 October 1957:

Party		Votes	%	Seats
Labour Party	Ap	129,456	46.47%	6
Conservative Party	H	106,385	38.19%	5
Liberal Party	V	16,039	5.76%	1
Christian Democratic Party	KrF	15,054	5.40%	1
Communist Party of Norway	K	11,407	4.09%	0
Liberal People's Party		249	0.09%	0
Valid votes		278,590	100.00%	13
Rejected votes		1,090	0.39%	
Total polled		279,680	83.15%	
Registered electors		336,336		

The following candidates were elected: Trygve Bratteli (Ap); Reidar Bruu (H); Einar Gerhardsen (Ap); Aase Lionæs (Ap); Per Lønning (H); Finn Moe (Ap); Konrad Nordahl (Ap); Erling Petersen (H); Berte Rognerud (H); Helge Seip (V); Rakel Seweriin (Ap); Erling Wikborg (KrF); and Kåre Willoch (H).

===== 1953 =====
Results of the 1953 parliamentary election held on 12 October 1953:

Party		Votes	%	Seats
Labour Party	Ap	119,784	43.02%	5
Conservative Party	H	105,817	38.01%	5
Liberal Party	V	18,195	6.54%	1
Communist Party of Norway	K	17,639	6.34%	1
Christian Democratic Party	KrF	16,961	6.09%	1
Wild Votes		11	0.00%	0
Valid votes		278,407	100.00%	13
Rejected votes		1,413	0.50%	
Total polled		279,820	84.60%	
Registered electors		330,765		

The following candidates were elected: Reidar Bruu (H); Trygve Bratteli (Ap); Lars Evensen (Ap); Einar Gerhardsen (Ap); C. J. Hambro (H); Finn Moe (Ap); Erling Petersen (H); Berte Rognerud (H); Helge Seip (V); Rakel Seweriin (Ap); Herman Smitt Ingebretsen (H); Johan Strand Johansen (K); and Erling Wikborg (KrF).

==== 1940s ====
===== 1949 =====
Results of the 1949 parliamentary election held on 10 October 1949:

Party		Votes	%	Seats
Labour Party	Ap	119,741	43.53%	4
Conservative Party	H	99,179	36.05%	3
Communist Party of Norway	K	21,535	7.83%	0
Liberal Party	V	19,017	6.91%	0
Christian Democratic Party	KrF	14,792	5.38%	0
Society Party	Samfp	827	0.30%	0
Wild Votes		2	0.00%	0
Valid votes		275,093	100.00%	7
Rejected votes		1,241	0.45%	
Total polled		276,334	87.45%	
Registered electors		315,988		

The following candidates were elected: Trygve Bratteli (Ap); Einar Gerhardsen (Ap); C. J. Hambro (H); Finn Moe (Ap); Rakel Seweriin (Ap); Herman Smitt Ingebretsen (H); and Rolf Stranger (H).

===== 1945 =====
Results of the 1945 parliamentary election held on 8 October 1945:

Party		Votes	%	Seats
Labour Party	Ap	68,670	40.18%	4
Conservative Party	H	51,084	29.89%	2
Communist Party of Norway	K	28,301	16.56%	1
Christian Democratic Party	KrF	16,456	9.63%	0
Liberal Party	V	6,389	3.74%	0
Valid votes		170,900	100.00%	7
Rejected votes		1,481	0.86%	
Total polled		172,381	85.12%	
Registered electors		202,520		

The following candidates were elected: Einar Gerhardsen (Ap); C. J. Hambro (H); Ingvald Haugen (Ap); Rakel Seweriin (Ap); Johan Strand Johansen (K); Rolf Stranger (H); and Oscar Torp (Ap).

==== 1930s ====
===== 1936 =====
Results of the 1936 parliamentary election held on 19 October 1936:

Party		Votes	%	Seats
Labour Party	Ap	86,345	51.27%	4
Conservative Party	H	69,258	41.12%	3
Nasjonal Samling	NS	6,227	3.70%	0
Liberal Party	V	4,475	2.66%	0
Society Party	Samfp	1,283	0.76%	0
Norwegian Christian Social Association	KrSF	694	0.41%	0
Peace Party	Fr	144	0.09%	0
Valid votes		168,426	100.00%	7
Rejected votes		995	0.59%	
Total polled		169,421	87.99%	
Registered electors		192,549		

The following candidates were elected: Eyvind Getz (H); C. J. Hambro (H); Olaf Josef Johansen (Ap); Alfred Madsen (Ap); Magnus Nilssen (Ap); Arthur Nordlie (H); and Oscar Torp (Ap).

===== 1933 =====
Results of the 1933 parliamentary election held on 16 October 1933:

Party		Party			List Alliance		
Party		Votes	%	Seats	Votes	%	Seats
Labour Party	Ap	73,601	49.13%	4	73,601	49.13%	4
Conservative Party	H	60,297	40.25%	3	61,489	41.05%	3
Farmers' Party	Bp	1,193	0.80%	0	61,489	41.05%	3
Liberal Party	V	5,460	3.64%	0	5,460	3.64%	0
Nasjonal Samling	NS	5,441	3.63%	0	7,956	5.31%	0
Free-minded People's Party	FF	2,518	1.68%	0	7,956	5.31%	0
Communist Party of Norway	K	1,008	0.67%	0	1,008	0.67%	0
Society Party	Samfp	292	0.19%	0	292	0.19%	0
Wild Votes		1	0.00%	0	1	0.00%	0
Valid votes		149,811	100.00%	7	149,807	100.00%	7
Rejected votes		660	0.44%				
Total polled		150,471	84.17%				
Registered electors		178,761					

As the list alliances were not entitled to more seats contesting as alliances than they were contesting as individual parties, the distribution of seats was as party votes.

The following candidates were elected: Eyvind Getz (H); C. J. Hambro (H); Olaf Josef Johansen (Ap); Helga Karlsen (Ap); Alfred Madsen (Ap); Magnus Nilssen (Ap); and Arthur Nordlie (H).

===== 1930 =====
Results of the 1930 parliamentary election held on 20 October 1930:

Party		Party			List Alliance		
Party		Votes	%	Seats	Votes	%	Seats
Conservative Party	H	72,362	51.42%	4	77,629	55.16%	4
Free-minded Liberal Party	FV	4,113	2.92%	0	77,629	55.16%	4
Farmers' Party	Bp	1,158	0.82%	0	77,629	55.16%	4
Labour Party	Ap	58,813	41.79%	3	58,813	41.79%	3
Liberal Party	V	3,677	2.61%	0	3,677	2.61%	0
Communist Party of Norway	K	610	0.43%	0	610	0.43%	0
Wild Votes		2	0.00%	0	2	0.00%	0
Valid votes		140,735	100.00%	7	140,731	100.00%	7
Rejected votes		772	0.55%				
Total polled		141,507	84.94%				
Registered electors		166,589					

As the list alliance was not entitled to more seats contesting as an alliance than it was contesting as individual parties, the distribution of seats was as party votes.

The following candidates were elected: Johan H. Andresen (H); C. J. Hambro (H); Olaf Josef Johansen (Ap); Alfred Madsen (Ap); Magnus Nilssen (Ap); Arthur Nordlie (H); and Augusta Stang (H).

==== 1920s ====
===== 1927 =====
Results of the 1927 parliamentary election held on 17 October 1927:

Party		Votes	%	Seats
Labour Party	Ap	62,168	48.31%	4
Conservative Party–Free-minded Liberal Party	H-FV	60,207	46.78%	3
Liberal Party	V	3,748	2.91%	0
Communist Party of Norway	K	1,360	1.06%	0
National Legion	NL	1,210	0.94%	0
Valid votes		128,693	100.00%	7
Rejected votes		1,253	0.96%	
Total polled		129,946	81.91%	
Registered electors		158,650		

The following candidates were elected: Johan H. Andresen (H-FV); C. J. Hambro (H-FV); Olaf Josef Johansen (Ap); Helga Karlsen (Ap); Alfred Madsen (Ap); Magnus Nilssen (Ap); and Arthur Nordlie (H-FV).

===== 1924 =====
Results of the 1924 parliamentary election held on 21 October 1924:

Party		Votes	%	Seats
Conservative Party–Free-minded Liberal Party	H-FV	67,216	52.77%	4
Labour Party	Ap	45,200	35.48%	3
Social Democratic Labour Party of Norway	S	10,323	8.10%	0
Communist Party of Norway	K	2,564	2.01%	0
Liberal Party	V	2,070	1.63%	0
Wild Votes		5	0.00%	0
Valid votes		127,378	100.00%	7
Rejected votes		1,265	0.98%	
Total polled		128,643	84.90%	
Registered electors		151,526		

The following candidates were elected: Sigurd Astrup (H-FV); Eyvind Getz (H-FV); C. J. Hambro (H-FV); Olaf Josef Johansen (Ap); Ingvald Rastad (Ap); Martin Tranmæl (Ap); and Karl Wilhelm Wefring (H-FV).

===== 1921 =====
Results of the 1921 parliamentary election held on 24 October 1921:

Party		Votes	%	Seats
Conservative Party–Free-minded Liberal Party	H-FV	61,524	55.51%	5
Labour Party	Ap	34,553	31.18%	2
Social Democratic Labour Party of Norway	S	11,526	10.40%	0
Liberal Party	V	3,207	2.89%	0
Wild Votes		21	0.02%	0
Valid votes		110,831	100.00%	7
Rejected votes		1,052	0.94%	
Total polled		111,883	77.39%	
Registered electors		144,572		

The following candidates were elected: Otto Bahr Halvorsen (H-FV); C. J. Hambro (H-FV); Kristian Kristensen (Ap); William Martin Nygaard (H-FV); Christian Emil Stoud Platou (H-FV); Karen Platou (H-FV); and Olav Scheflo (Ap).
