= Grunde Almeland =

Norwegian politician (born 1991)

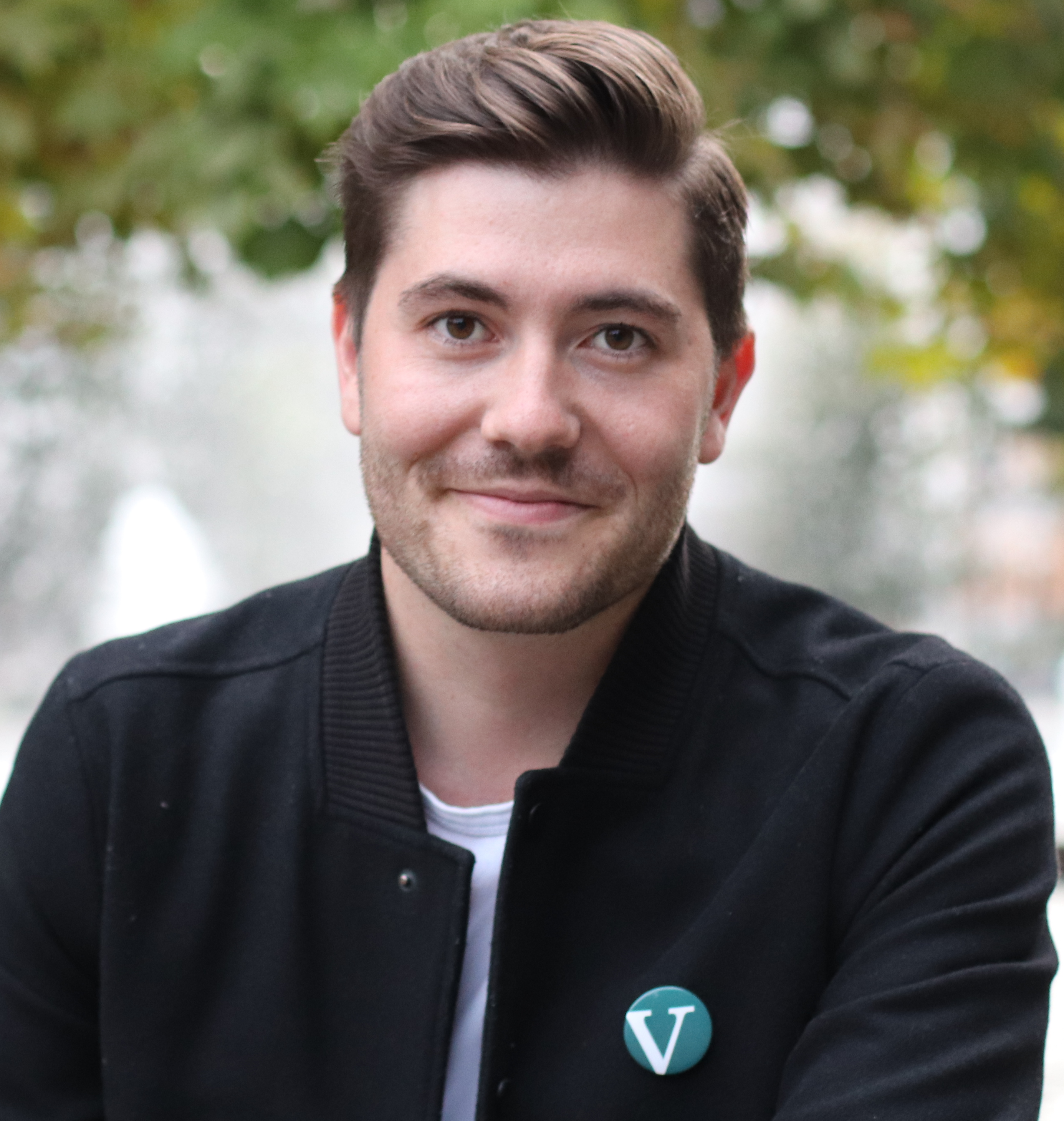

Member of the Storting
- Incumbent
- Assumed office 1 October 2021
- Constituency: Oslo

Chair of the Standing Committee on Family and Cultural Affairs
- In office 21 October 2021 – 30 September 2025
- First Deputy: Tage Pettersen
- Second Deputy: Åslaug Sem-Jacobsen
- Preceded by: Kristin Ørmen Johnsen
- Succeeded by: Bente Estil

Leader of Oslo Liberal Party
- In office 9 February 2020 – 3 February 2024
- Preceded by: Espen Ophaug
- Succeeded by: Anna Dåsnes

State Secretary to the Minister of Education
- In office 24 January 2020 – 14 October 2021
- Prime Minister: Erna Solberg
- Minister: Guri Melby

Deputy Member of the Storting
- In office 1 October 2017 – 30 September 2021
- Deputising for: Ola Elvestuen (2018–2020)
- Constituency: Oslo

State Secretary to the Minister of Trade and Industry
- In office 13 March 2020 – 5 October 2020
- Prime Minister: Erna Solberg
- Minister: Iselin Nybø

Personal details
- Born: 29 March 1991 (age 35) Bergen, Norway
- Party: Liberal
- Education: University of Oslo

Grunde Kreken Almeland (born 29 March 1991) is a Norwegian politician for the Liberal Party.

== Political career ==
=== Youth party ===
He served as the first deputy leader of the Young Liberals of Norway from 2015 until October 2017.

=== Parliament ===
He served as a deputy representative to the Storting, Norway's parliament, from Oslo between 2017 and 2021. Between 2018 and 2020, he deputised for Ola Elvestuen, who was appointed Minister of Climate and the Environment in the Solberg Cabinet. He was elected as a regular representative at the 2021 election.

In parliament, he sat on the Standing Committee on Family and Cultural Affairs between 2018 and 2020. He later became chair of the same committee in 2021 and concurrently sat on the Standing Committee on Scrutiny and Constitutional Affairs. He notably served as the case officer in the impartiality investigations into members of the Støre government and Conservative Party leader Erna Solberg.

=== Government ===
Following the Progress Party's withdrawal from government in January 2020, Almeland was appointed state secretary at the Ministry of Education, a position he held until the government's defeat at the 2021 election. He also concurrently served as state secretary to the Ministry of Trade and Fisheries from March to October 2020.

== Personal life ==
He studied law at the University of Oslo until becoming a member of parliament.

He is a son of teachers Olav Kreken and May-Britt Almeland.

Almeland considers himself a gamer outside of politics. He is openly gay and is married.

Preceded by Ingrid Keenan	First Deputy Leader of the Young Liberals of Norway; 2015–2017	Succeeded by Tiril Eid Barland
