= 1949 Norwegian parliamentary election =

- 10 October 1949

All 150 seats in the Norwegian Parliament 76 seats were needed for a majority
- Turnout: 82.02%
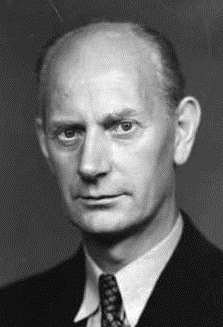

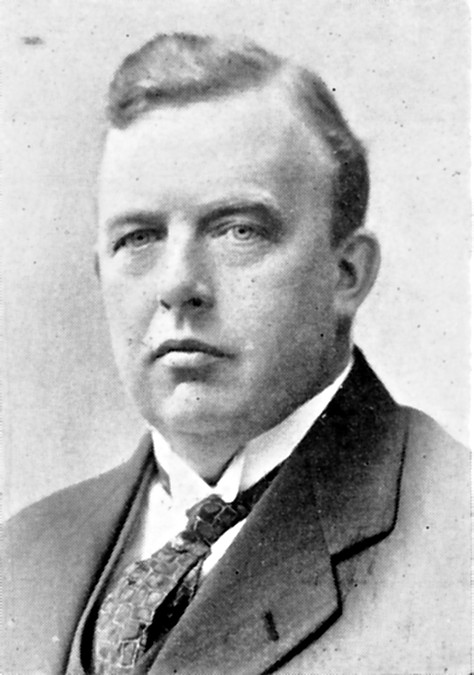

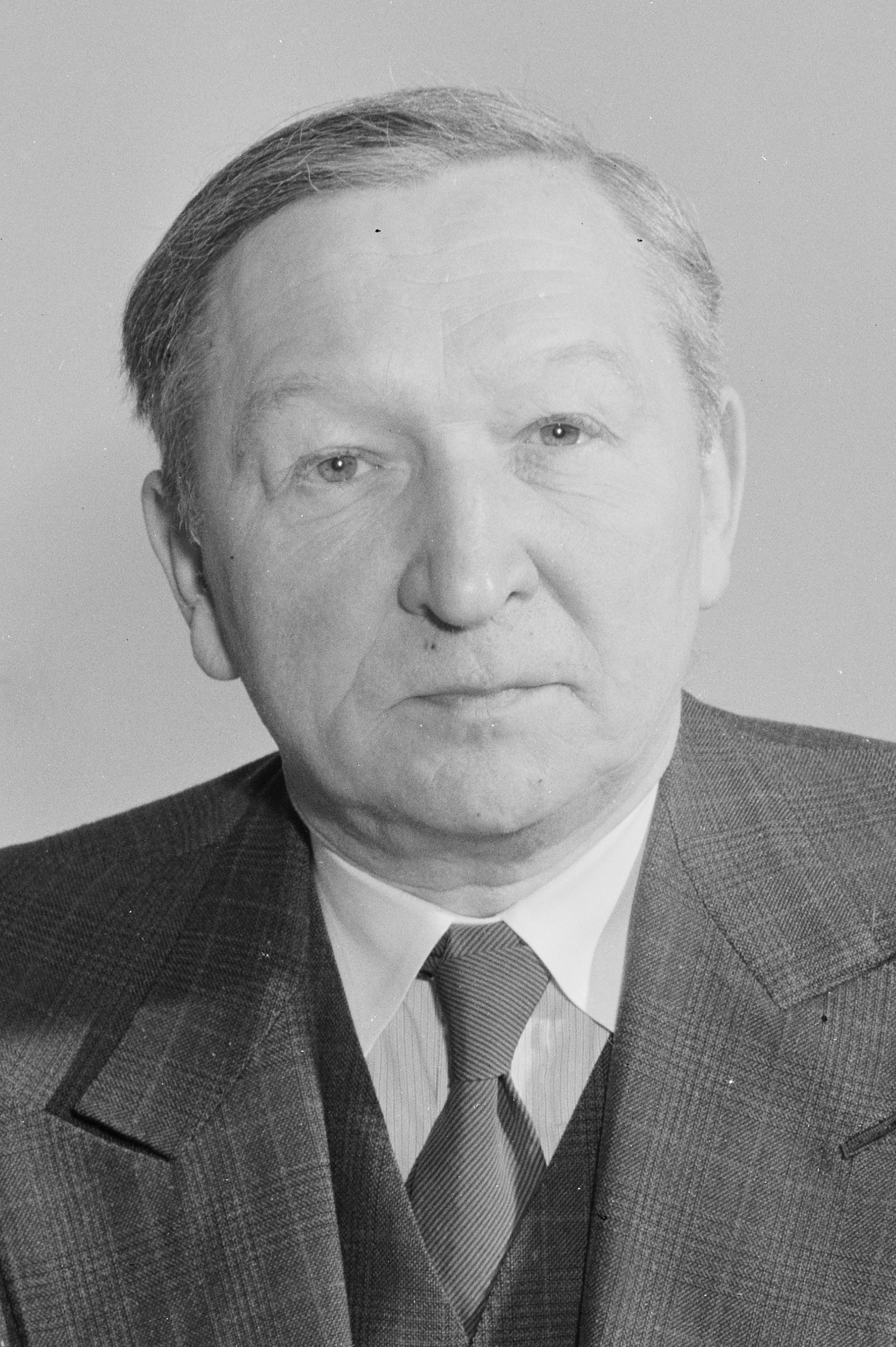

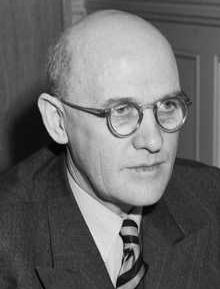

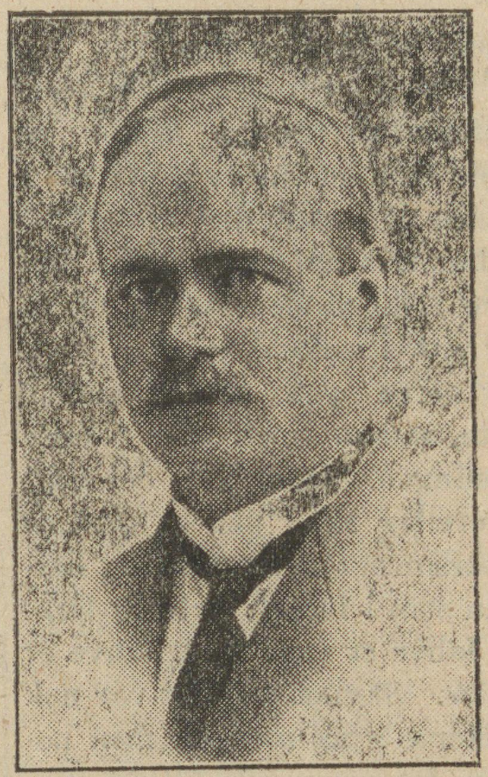
	First party	Second party	Third party
Leader	Einar Gerhardsen	Arthur Nordlie	Jacob Worm-Müller
Party	Labour	Conservative	Liberal
Last election	76 seats, 42.5%	25 seats, 17.0%	20 seats, 13.8%
Seats won	85	23	21
Seat change	▲9	▼2	▲1
Popular vote	803,471	360,961^{[a]}^{[b]}	290,919^{[a]}^{[c]}^{[d]}
Percentage	45.7%	20.5%^{[a]}^{[b]}	16.5%^{[a]}^{[c]}^{[d]}
	Fourth party	Fifth party
Leader	Einar Frogner	Nils Lavik
Party	Farmers'	Christian Democratic
Last election	10 seats, 8.0%	8 seats, 7.9%
Seats won	12	9
Seat change	▲2	▲1
Popular vote	188,997^{[a]}^{[b]}^{[c]}	151,402^{[d]}
Percentage	10.8%^{[a]}^{[b]}^{[c]}	8.1%^{[d]}
- Results by county
Prime Minister before election
Einar Gerhardsen
Labour
Prime Minister after election
Einar Gerhardsen
Labour

Parliamentary elections were held in Norway on 10 October 1949. The result was a victory for the Labour Party, which won 85 of the 150 seats in the Storting.

== Contesting parties ==
Name		Ideology	Position	Leader	1945 result	
Name		Ideology	Position	Leader	Votes (%)	Seats
Ap	Labour Party; Arbeiderpartiet	Social democracy	Centre-left	Einar Gerhardsen	41.0%	76 / 150
H	Conservative Party; Høyre	Conservatism	Centre-right	Arthur Nordlie	17.0%	25 / 150
V	Liberal Party; Venstre	Social liberalism	Centre	Jacob Worm-Müller	13.8%	20 / 150
NKP	Communist Party of Norway; Norges Kommunistiske Parti	Communism	Far-left	Emil Løvlien	11.9%	11 / 150
Bp	Farmer's Party; Bondepartiet	Agrarianism	Centre	Einar Frogner	8.0%	10 / 150
KrF	Christian Democratic Party; Kristelig Folkeparti	Christian democracy	Centre to centre-right	Nils Lavik	7.9%	8 / 150

== Endorsements ==
Newspaper	Party endorsed
Minerva	Conservative Party

== Results ==
Party	Votes	%	Seats	+/–
Labour Party	803,471	45.69	85	+9
Conservative Party	279,790	15.91	21	–2
Liberal Party	218,866	12.45	20	+1
Christian Democratic Party	147,068	8.36	9	+1
Communist Party	102,722	5.84	0	–11
Farmers' Party	85,418	4.86	6	+2
Farmers–Conservatives–Liberals (Note: The joint list of the Farmers' Party, Conservative Party and Liberal Party won four seats, two taken by the Conservative Party and two by the Farmers' Party.)	45,311	2.58	4	–
Farmers–Conservatives (Note: The joint list of the Farmers' Party and Conservative Party won three seats, all taken by the Farmers' Party.)	35,860	2.04	3	–
Farmers–Liberals (Note: The joint list of the Farmers' Party and Liberal Party won two seats, with both parties taking one each.)	22,408	1.27	2	–
Society Party	13,088	0.74	0	0
Christians–Liberals (Note: The joint list of the Liberal Party and Christian Democratic Party won no seats.)	4,334	0.25	0	–
Wild votes	30	0.00	–	–
Total	1,758,366	100.00	150	0
Valid votes	1,758,366	99.29		
Invalid/blank votes	12,531	0.71		
Total votes	1,770,897	100.00		
Registered voters/turnout	2,159,065	82.02		
Source: Nohlen & Stöver

=== Seat distribution ===
Constituency	Total seats	Seats won				
Constituency	Total seats	Ap	H	V	B	KrF
Akershus	7	4	2		1	
Aust-Agder	4	3		1		
Bergen	5	3	1	1		
Buskerud	5	3	1		1	
Finnmark	3	3				
Hedmark	7	5		1	1	
Hordaland	8	3	1	2		2
Market towns of Akershus and Østfold	4	3	1			
Market towns of Buskerud	3	2	1			
Market towns of Hedmark and Oppland	3	2	1			
Market towns of Møre og Romsdal	3	2		1		
Market towns of Nordland, Troms and Finnmark	4	2	1	1		
Market towns of Sør-Trøndelag and Nord-Trøndelag	5	3	2			
Market towns of Telemark and Aust-Agder	5	3	1	1		
Market towns of Vest-Agder and Rogaland	7	4	1	2		
Market towns of Vestfold	4	2	2			
Møre og Romsdal	7	2		2		3
Nord-Trøndelag	5	3		1	1	
Nordland	8	5	1	1		1
Oppland	6	4			2	
Oslo	7	4	3			
Østfold	6	3			2	1
Rogaland	5	2	1	1		1
Sogn og Fjordane	5	2		2	1	
Sør-Trøndelag	6	3	1		1	1
Telemark	5	3	1	1		
Troms	5	4		1		
Vest-Agder	4	1		2	1	
Vestfold	4	2	1		1	
Total	150	85	23	21	12	9
Source: Norges Offisielle Statistikk
