= Viljugrein =

Viljugrein is a Norwegian surname. Notable people with the surname include:

- Agnes Nærland Viljugrein (born 1997), Norwegian politician
- Ann Viljugrein, Director of Banking and Insurance Supervision
- Bjørn Viljugrein (born 1969), Norwegian retired footballer
