= Trine Skei Grande =

Norwegian politician (born 1969)

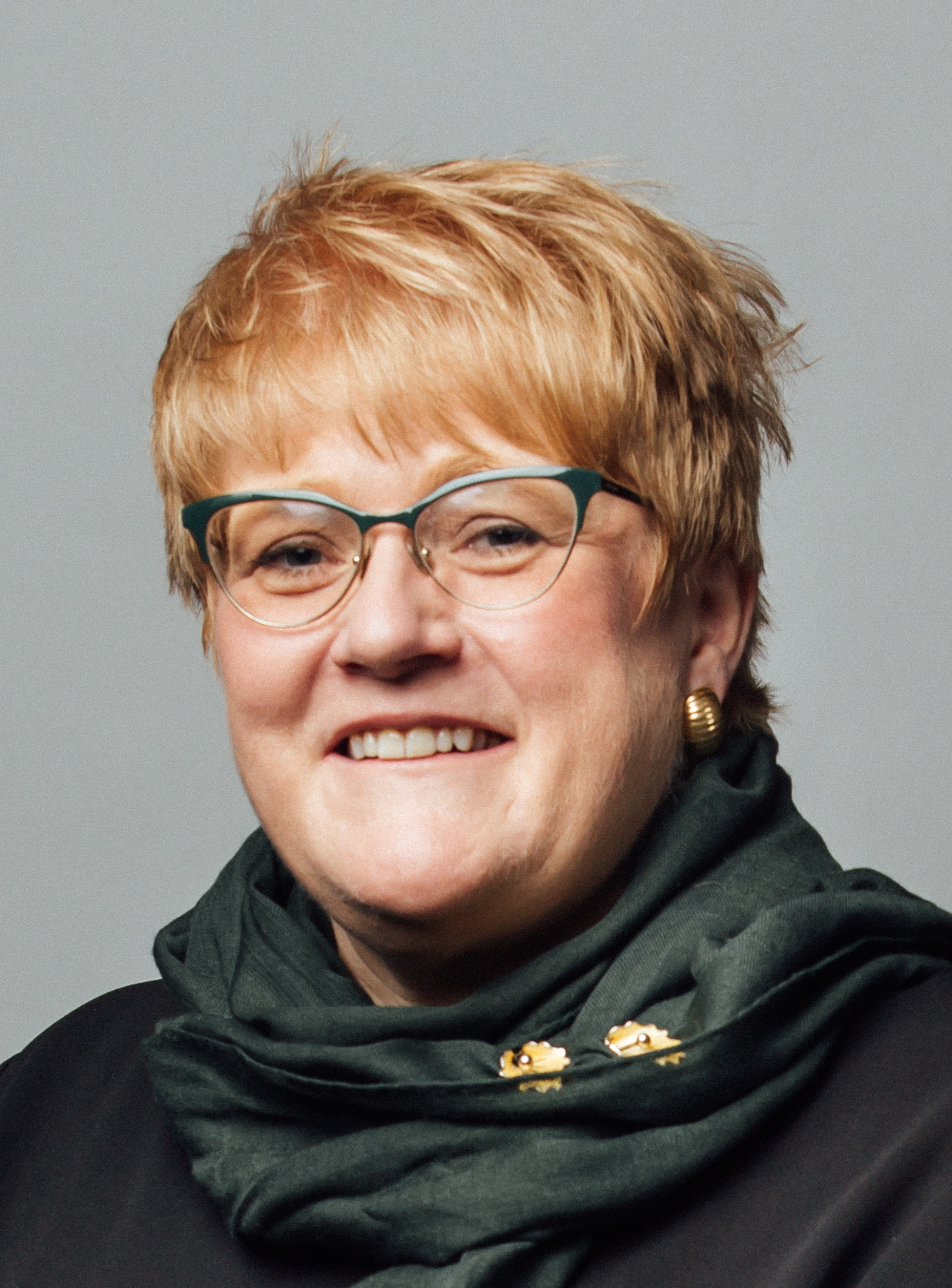
- Skei Grande in 2019

Minister of Education and Integration
- In office 24 January 2020 – 13 March 2020
- Prime Minister: Erna Solberg
- Preceded by: Jan Tore Sanner
- Succeeded by: Guri Melby

Minister of Culture
- In office 17 January 2018 – 24 January 2020
- Prime Minister: Erna Solberg
- Preceded by: Linda Hofstad Helleland
- Succeeded by: Abid Raja

Leader of the Liberal Party
- In office 17 April 2010 – 26 September 2020
- First Deputy: Helge Solum Larsen; Ola Elvestuen
- Second Deputy: Ola Elvestuen; Terje Breivik
- Preceded by: Lars Sponheim
- Succeeded by: Guri Melby

Member of the Norwegian Parliament
- In office 1 October 2001 – 30 September 2021
- Constituency: Oslo

Oslo City Commissioner of Culture and Education
- In office 29 November 2000 – 7 November 2001
- Governing Mayor: Erling Lae
- Preceded by: Bård Folke Fredriksen
- Succeeded by: Kjell Veivåg

Personal details
- Born: 2 October 1969 (age 57) Overhalla Municipality, Nord-Trøndelag, Norway
- Party: Liberal
- Education: University of Oslo

Trine Skei Grande (born 2 October 1969) is a Norwegian politician who served as the leader of the Liberal Party of Norway from 2010 to 2020. She also served as Minister of Education from January to March 2020, and as Minister of Culture and Gender Equality from 2018 to 2020. She was also a member of parliament for Oslo from 2001 to 2021.

== Early life and education ==
Grande was born in Overhalla Municipality on 2 October 1969. She studied economics at introductory level at NTNU and later political science and history at introductory level at the University of Oslo. Prior to entering politics full-time she worked as a part-time journalist, a high school teacher and as a lecturer at Nord-Trøndelag University College.

== Political career ==
The current Storting is her fourth consecutive term as a member, after first serving as deputy Member of Parliament from 2001 for Minister Odd Einar Dørum, and became Parliamentary Leader of the Liberal Party from 2001 until 2005. She was elected as Member of Parliament in the 2005 parliamentary election, and then re-elected in the 2009 and 2013 parliamentary elections.

Grande was a member of the Liberal Party central board in 1999–2000, and was deputy leader from 2000 until 2010. Grande was elected MP for Oslo in 2009 parliamentary election, although the Liberal Party suffered a severe blow; she and Borghild Tenden of Akershus were the only Liberal MPs to be elected.

She is a member of the Norwegian Association for Women's Rights and has highlighted the legacy of her predecessor as Liberal Party leader Eva Kolstad.

== Party leadership ==
Following the resignation of Lars Sponheim as party leader, she was elected leader of the Liberal Party at the General Assembly in 2010.

In 2013, under her leadership, the Liberal parliamentary group grew with seven more members of parliament. After January 2018, the Liberal Party entered government as a junior partner with the Conservative and Progress parties, taking three positions in the cabinet. On 11 March 2020, she announced her intention to resign as party leader, minister and not stand for re-election in 2021. She was succeeded by fellow party member Guri Melby as Minister of Education two days later, and as party leader at the party conference in September.

=== Standing committee membership ===
- 2013–2017 member of Foreign Affairs and Defence
- 2009–2013 member of Education, Research and Church Affairs
- 2009–2013 member of Enlarged Committee on Foreign Affairs
- 2009–2013 member of Scrutiny and Constitutional Affairs
- 2009–2013 member of Election Committee
- 2005–2009 member of Family and Cultural Affairs
- 2005–2009 member of Election Committee
- 2001–2005 member of Enlarged Committee on Foreign Affairs
- 2001–2005 member of Enlarged Committee on Foreign Affairs
- 2001–2005 member of Election Committee

== Post politics ==
In January 2024, it was announced that she would become the administrative director at the Norwegian Publishers' Association.

Political offices
| Preceded by Bård Folke Fredriksen | Oslo City Commissioner of Culture and Education; 2000–2001 | Succeeded by Kjell Veivåg |
| Preceded by Linda Hofstad Helleland | Minister of Culture; 2018–2020 | Succeeded by Abid Raja |
| Preceded by Jan Tore Sanner | Minister of Education; January – March 2020 | Succeeded by Guri Melby |
Party political offices
| Preceded by Lars Sponheim | Leader of the Norwegian Liberal Party; 2010–2020 | Succeeded by Guri Melby |
