= Aina Stenersen =

Norwegian politician (born 1983)

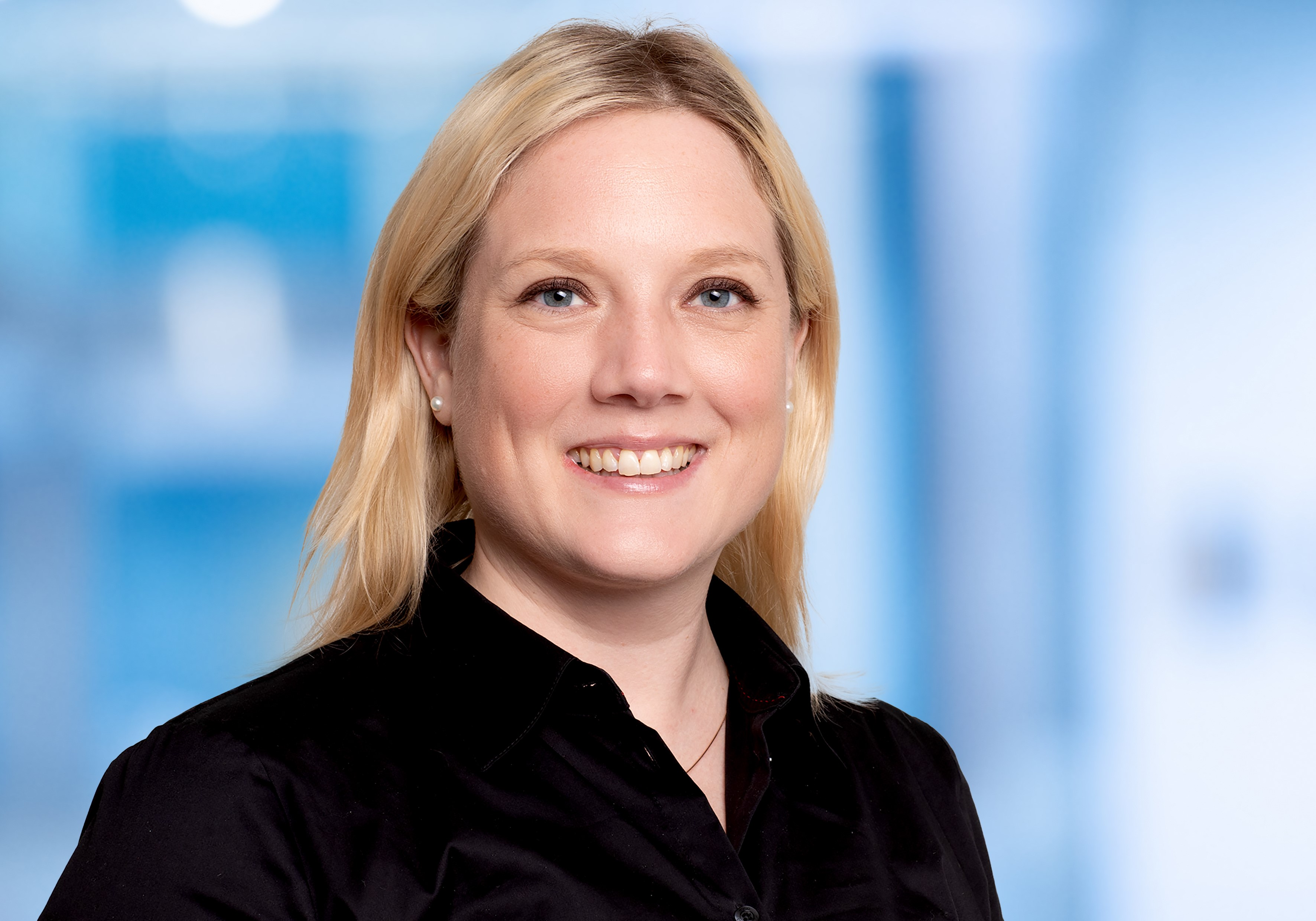
- Stenersen in 2022

Member of the Storting
- Incumbent
- Assumed office 1 October 2025
- Constituency: Oslo

Personal details
- Born: 4 September 1983 (age 42)
- Party: Progress Party

Aina Charlotte Bergvik Stenersen (born 4 September 1983) is a Norwegian politician who was elected member of the Storting in 2025. From 2009 to 2025, she was a deputy member of the Storting.
