= Ola Elvestuen =

Norwegian politician (born 1967)

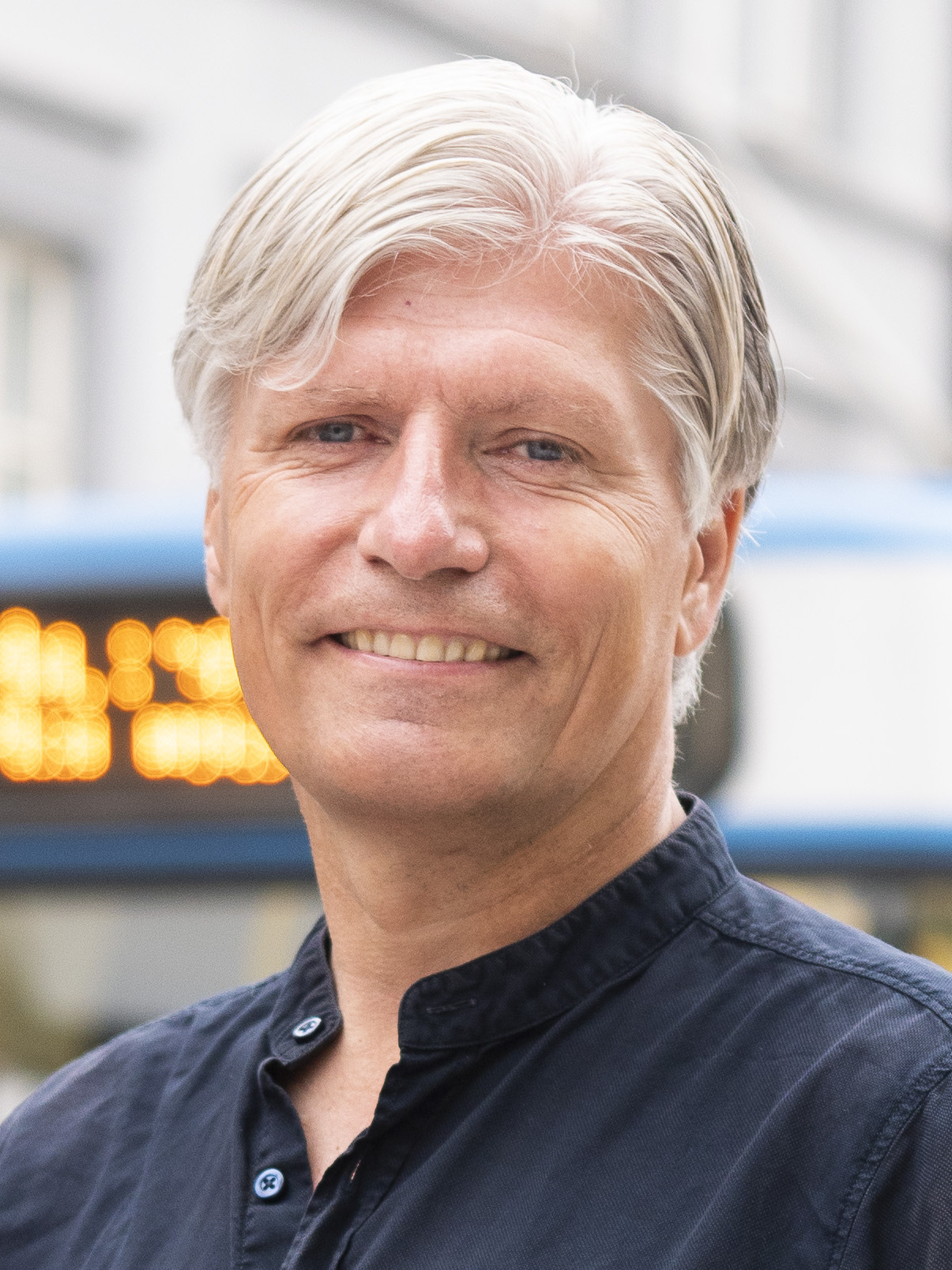
- Elvestuen in 2021

Minister of Climate and the Environment
- In office 17 January 2018 – 24 January 2020
- Prime Minister: Erna Solberg
- Preceded by: Vidar Helgesen
- Succeeded by: Sveinung Rotevatn

First Deputy Leader of the Liberal Party
- In office 14 April 2012 – 26 September 2020
- Leader: Trine Skei Grande
- Preceded by: Helge Solum Larsen
- Succeeded by: Sveinung Rotevatn

Member of the Norwegian Parliament
- Incumbent
- Assumed office 1 October 2013
- Deputy: Grunde Almeland (2018–2020)
- Constituency: Oslo

Second Deputy Leader of the Liberal Party
- In office 13 April 2008 – 14 April 2012
- Leader: Lars Sponheim; Trine Skei Grande
- Succeeded by: Terje Breivik

Oslo City Commissioner for Transport and the Environment
- In office 24 October 2011 – 15 October 2013
- Governing Mayor: Stian Berger Røsland
- Preceded by: Jøran Kallmyr
- Succeeded by: Guri Melby

Personal details
- Born: 9 October 1967 (age 58) Vestre Toten Municipality, Norway
- Party: Liberal
- Spouse: Greta Elvestuen

Ola Elvestuen (born 9 October 1967) is a Norwegian politician for the Liberal Party who served as Minister of Climate and the Environment from 2018 to 2020. He was also the party's deputy leader from 2008 to 2020 (2008–2012 as second deputy and 2012–2020 as first deputy), and has been an MP for Oslo since 2013.

== Personal life ==
He is married to Greta Elvestuen.

He is a younger brother of illustrator Per Elvestuen.

== Political career ==
=== Party politics ===
In 2008, he became second deputy leader of his party, and then first deputy in 2012, which he was until 2020.

=== Local politics ===
On the local level Elvestuen was a member of Oslo city council from 2003 to 2015, and served as city commissioner for public transport and environmental affairs from 2011 until his election to Parliament in 2013.

=== Parliament ===
Elvestuen was a member of the Storting from Oslo in 2013, and served as leader of the Energy and the Environment Committee since 2013. He has been re-elected to Parliament since.

Prior to this, he served as a deputy representative to the Storting from Oslo from 2001 to 2013.

=== Minister of Climate and the Environment ===
After the Liberal Party entered the Solberg Cabinet, Elvestuen was appointed minister of climate and the environment on 17 January 2018, succeeding the Conservatives' Vidar Helgesen.

In April 2018, he announced that the government would be adding 2 million NOK to the "Fishing for litter" scheme for 2018, in response to plastic being discovered at a bird mountain in Runde.

In June, he announced that the government would approve the establishment of Lofotodden National Park in Nordland county, which had been proposed by both Moskenes Municipality and Flakstad Municipality.

In October, he praised Mattvett and Findus' advertisements at the Oslo train station, which showed that 335 000 tons of food is wasted a year. He notably praised them for raising awareness of food wasting and called on consumers to help reduce food waste.

In May 2019, Elvestuen expressed his disagreement with his Brazilian counterpart, Ricardo Salles, who had stated that Norway's billion contribution to the Amazon rain forest fund was futile. Elvestuen stated: "The fund as a whole has certainly contributed to reduced deforestation. Norway's cooperation with Brazil is results-based. All Norwegian funds are a reward for reducing deforestation".

Elvestuen was among the non-Progress Party ministers to be dismissed on 24 January 2020 alongside the Progress Party ministers, who stepped down as a result of their party withdrawing from government. He was succeeded by fellow Liberal Party member Sveinung Rotevatn.

In her self biography released in 2021 after her resignation, Siv Jensen described Elvestuen as the "most active cabinet member who wanted to tear down the coalition's cooperation". She also said that he demanded many postponed government conferences "by many hours" and "never gave up". Elvestuen refused to comment Jensen's recollection of him, but notes that there was hard fighting for many issues such as climate change, nature and drug reform.

Party political offices
| Preceded by Helge Solum Larsen | First Deputy Leader of the Liberal Party; 2012–2020 | Succeeded by Sveinung Rotevatn |
| Preceded by N/A | Second Deputy Leader of the Liberal Party; 2008–2012 | Succeeded by Terje Breivik |
Political offices
| Preceded by Vidar Helgesen | Minister of Climate and the Environment; 2018–2020 | Succeeded by Sveinung Rotevatn |
| Preceded by Jøran Kallmyr | Oslo City Commissioner for Transport and the Environment; 2011–2013 | Succeeded by Guri Melby |
