= Trine Lise Sundnes =

Norwegian politician

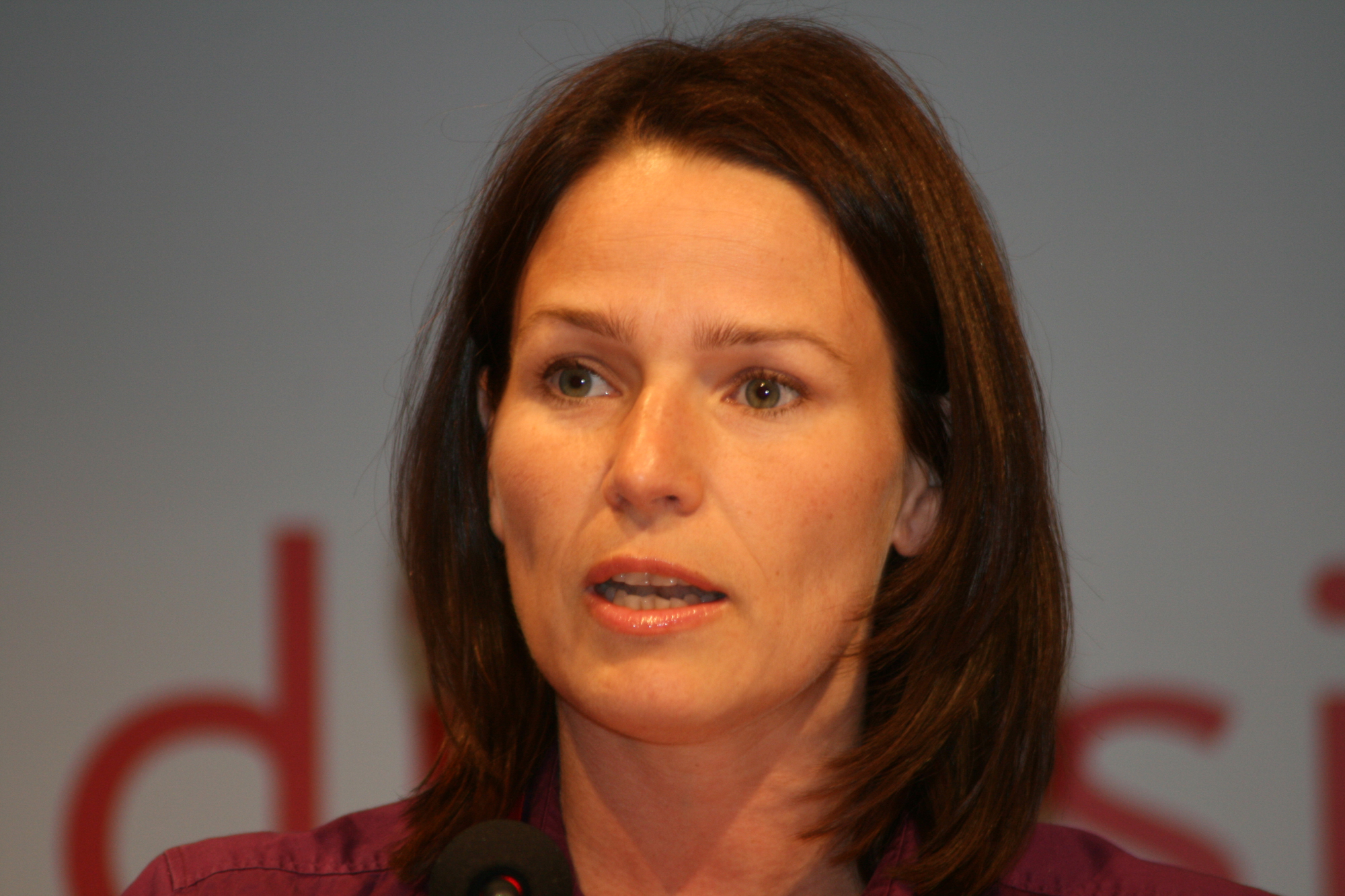

Deputy Member of the Storting
- Incumbent
- Assumed office 1 October 2025
- Deputising for: Jonas Gahr Støre (2025–)
- Constituency: Oslo

Member of the Storting
- In office 1 October 2021 – 30 September 2025
- Constituency: Oslo

Personal details
- Born: 6 February 1970 (age 56)
- Party: Labour Party
- Occupation: Politician

Trine Lise Sundnes (born 6 February 1970) is a Norwegian politician and trade unionist.

== Political career ==
She was elected as a regular representative to the Storting from the constituency of Oslo at the 2021 election. She was elected as a deputy representative to the Storting for the same constituency at the 2025 election, and has deputised for Jonas Gahr Støre while he is serving as prime minister.

Sundnes was board member of the International Labour Organization (ILO) from 2008 to 2014, and has been chairman of the board of the United Nations Association of Norway since 2015.
