= Mathilde Tybring-Gjedde =

Norwegian politician (born 1992)

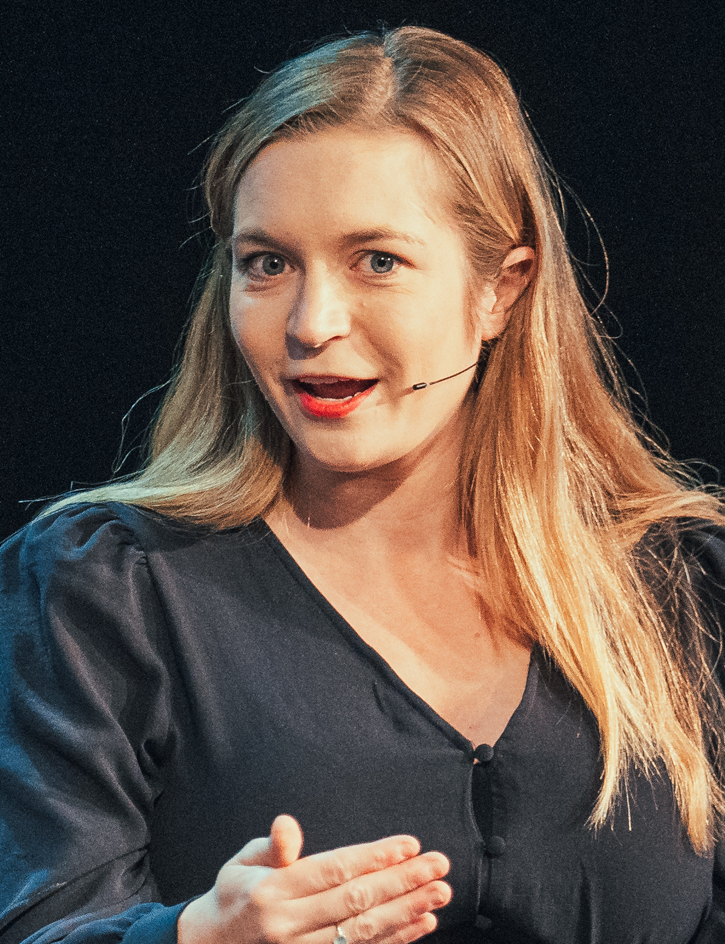
- Mathilde Tybring-Gjedde in 2024

Member of the Storting
- Incumbent
- Assumed office 1 October 2021
- Constituency: Oslo

Deputy Member of the Storting
- In office 1 October 2017 – 30 September 2021
- Deputising for: Ine Eriksen Søreide (2017–2021)
- Constituency: Oslo

Personal details
- Born: 15 December 1992 (age 33)
- Party: Conservative
- Domestic partner: Christian H. Bjerke
- Children: 2
- Parent: Christian Tybring-Gjedde
- Education: University of Warwick

Mathilde Tybring-Gjedde (born 15 December 1992) is a Norwegian politician.

== Political career ==
She was formally a deputy representative to the Storting for the period 2017–2021 for the Conservative Party, but stood in for Minister of Foreign Affairs Ine Marie Eriksen Søreide as a regularly meeting representative at the Storting during the entire term. She was elected ordinary representative to the Storting from the constituency of Oslo in 2021.

She was reelected representative to the Storting from Oslo for the period 2025–2029.

== Personal life and education ==
Born on 15 December 1992, Tybring-Gjedde is a daughter of Christian Tybring-Gjedde. She graduated with a bachelor degree in Philosophy, Politics and Economics from the University of Warwick.
