= United Nations Association of Norway =

The United Nations Association of Norway (Norwegian: FN-sambandet) is an information organisation in Norway.

It was established as Norsk Samband for de Forente Nasjoner ("Norwegian Association for the United Nations"), but later changed its name. It is a member body in the World Federation of United Nations Associations, and its purpose is to inform schools and media about the United Nations activities. Chairman of the board is Trine Lise Sundnes, secretary-general is Anne Cathrine da Silva and the organizational headquarters are in Oslo with offices in six additional cities.
