= Marianne Marthinsen =

Norwegian politician

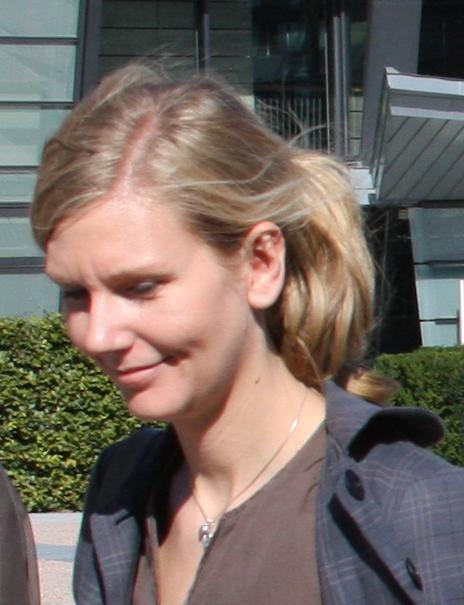
Marianne Marthinsen.

Marianne Marthinsen (born 25 August 1980, in Jevnaker) is a Norwegian politician for the Labour Party.

She was elected to the Norwegian Parliament from Oslo in 2005.

She graduated from University of Oslo in 2001, having studied economics. She has a somewhat diverse working background, having been a journalist in Romerikes Blad, nurse assistant, office worker and secretary of the Workers' Youth League. She has also been involved in Nei til EU, Attac Norway and Fredsinitiativet.
