= Rune E. Kristiansen =

Norwegian politician (1948–2026)

Rune Egil Kristiansen (30 October 1948 – 28 January 2026) was a Norwegian typographer, trade unionist and politician for the Labour Party.

He was born in Oslo as a son of trade unionist Willard Kristiansen (1927–1972) and Kirsten, née Storøy (1926–1989). He finished vocational school in 1966, undertook a three-year apprenticeship in typography and worked as a typographer in Arbeiderbladet from 1969 to 1979 and Verdens Gang from 1979 to 1980. In 1980 he became a national board member of the Norwegian Graphical Union, and in 1984 he became leader of the Norwegian Graphical Union and Oslo Graphical Union. From 1987 he was also a supervisory council member in the Norwegian Confederation of Trade Unions, and from 1988 he was a board member of Oslo faglige samorg. He rescinded all positions in 1989 to become an elected politician.

Kristensen was elected as a deputy representative to the Parliament of Norway from Oslo during the terms 1989–1993 and 1993–1997. However, he met as a regular representative during seven of those eight years, initially as a stand-in for Gro Harlem Brundtland who served as Prime Minister; later for Thorbjørn Berntsen who took part in Jagland's Cabinet. In the 1997 Norwegian parliamentary election Kristiansen was finally elected as a full member, and served through 2001. He was the secretary of the Standing Committee on Church Affairs, Education and Research.
