= Jan Bøhler =

Norwegian politician (born 1952)

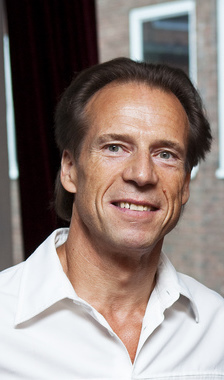

Member of the Norwegian Parliament
- In office 1 October 2005 – 30 September 2021
- Constituency: Oslo

State Secretary for the Ministry of Foreign Affairs
- In office 26 January 2001 – 19 October 2001
- Prime Minister: Jens Stoltenberg
- Minister: Thorbjørn Jagland

Personal details
- Born: 1 March 1952 (age 74) Oslo, Norway
- Party: Save Ullevål Hospital; Centre (2020–2025); Labour (until 2020)

Jan Bøhler (born 1 March 1952) is a Norwegian politician for the Save Ullevål Hospital electoral list. He was previously a member of the Centre Party and the Labour Party. He served as a member of Parliament representing Oslo, from 2005 to 2021.

== Career ==
=== Stoltenberg’s first cabinet ===
From January to October 2001, during the first cabinet Stoltenberg, Bøhler served as State Secretary in the Ministry of Foreign Affairs. He left his position after his party lost the election.

=== Local politics ===
Locally, Bøhler was the party secretary of the local party chapter from 2002, and leader from 2004. Between 1991 and 1995 he was secretary to the Oslo city council chairman Rune Gerhardsen.

=== Parliament ===
He was elected to the Norwegian Parliament from Oslo in 2005. He was re-elected three times since, but lost his seat in the 2021 election.

== Bibliography ==
- Østkantfolk (2020; non-fiction), co-authored by Einar Haakaas
- Nær folk (2021; non-fiction), co-authored by Trygve Slagsvold Vedum
