= Haldis Havrøy =

Norwegian politician

Haldis Havrøy (28 July 1925 – 10 September 2000) was a Norwegian politician for the Labour Party.

Havrøy was born in Hadsel Municipality. She was elected to the Norwegian Parliament from Oslo in 1973, and was re-elected on two occasions.
