= Lars Rise =

Norwegian politician (born 1955)

Lars Rise (born 18 March 1955) is a Norwegian politician for the Christian Democratic Party. He represented Oslo in the Norwegian Parliament from 1997 to 2005.

== Early life and career ==
Rise was born in Hamar as a son of pastor Per Louis Rise and office clerk Ingegjerd Martens. He studied at the University of Bergen from 1975 to 1981, and took the cand.polit. degree in 1989.

Between 1976 and 1982 he worked summer jobs as a journalist for Stavanger Aftenblad, Bergens Tidende, Aftenposten and NRK. He was news editor of Dagen from 1986 to 1987, and editor of the newspaper Midhordland in 1987. He was congress director of the Norwegian Association of Local and Regional Authorities from 1989 to 1992, and chief executive of Sykkel-VM 93, the organisation behind the 1993 cycling world championships, from 1992 to 1996. In 2007 he became secretary-general of the small business association Småbedriftsforbundet.

== Political career ==
Rise led the Hordaland chapter of the party's youth wing, KrFU, from 1976 to 1980, and was a member of the Hordaland county council from 1979 to 1983. From 1983 to 1986 he was a personal secretary in the Ministry of Trade and Shipping.

He was first elected to the Storting from Oslo in 1997, and was re-elected in 2001. In his first term he sat on the Standing Committee on Energy and the Environment and, from 2000, the Standing Committee on Defence; in his second term he was a member of the Standing Committee on Foreign Affairs. He later served as a deputy representative from Telemark from 2013 to 2017.

In November 2024, Rise challenged Øyvind Håbrekke for first place on the party's Oslo list for the 2025 parliamentary election, losing the vote 29–30.
