= Berte Rognerud =

Norwegian politician

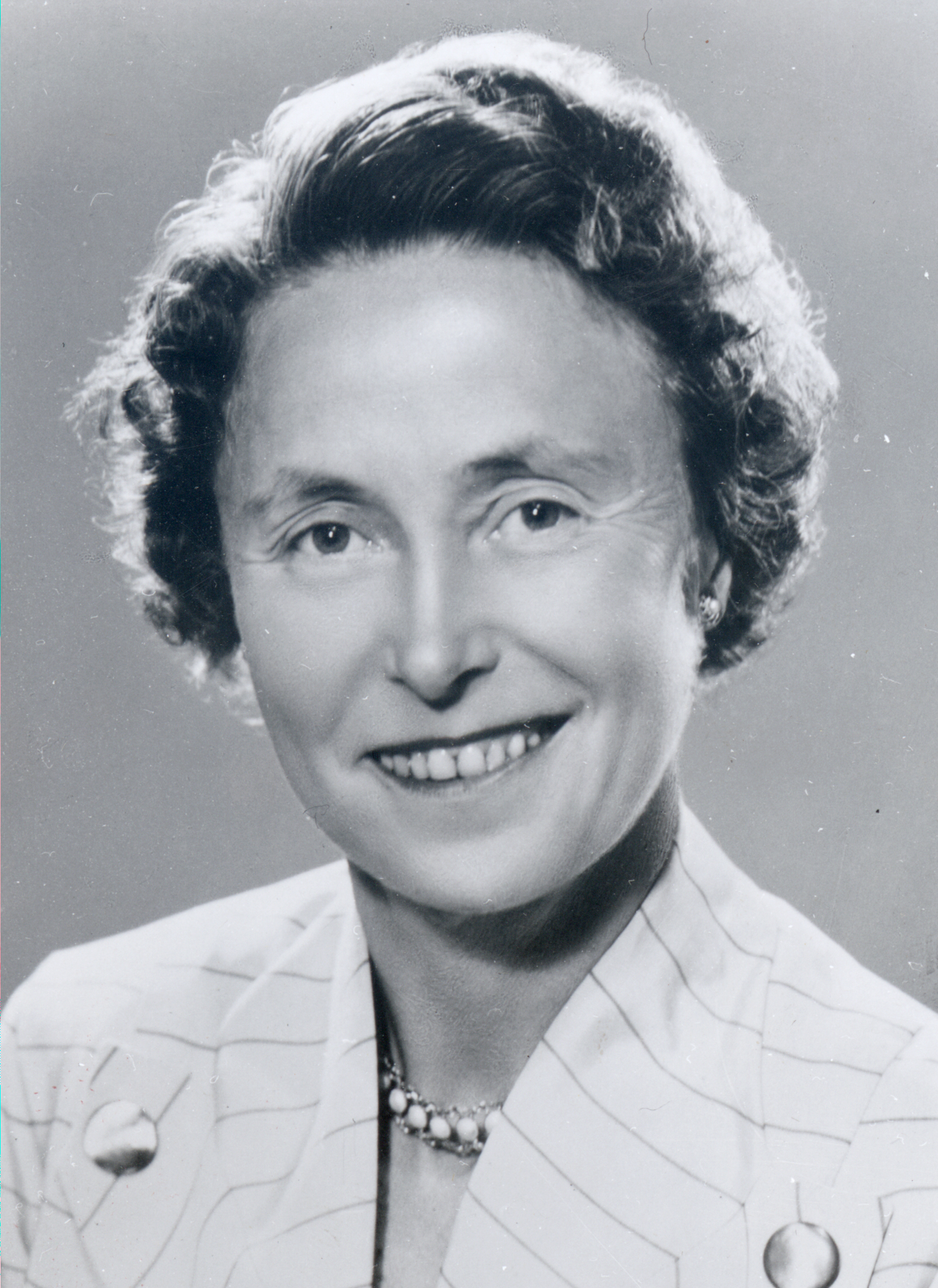
Berte Rognerud

Berte Rognerud (29 March 1907 – 27 January 1997) was a Norwegian politician for the Conservative Party.

She was born in Østre Toten Municipality.

She was elected to the Norwegian Parliament from Oslo in 1954, and was re-elected on four occasions.
