= Feminist Initiative (Norway) =

Feminist Initiative Feministisk initiativ
- Leader: Cathrine Linn Kristiansen; Sunniva Schultze-Florey
- Founded: 2015
- Ideology: Feminism
- Colours: Pink

Website
- feministiskinitiativ.no

Feminist Initiative (Norwegian: Feministisk initiativ; abbreviated FI) is a political party in Norway. It defines itself as a feminist party, based on inclusion and intersectionality.

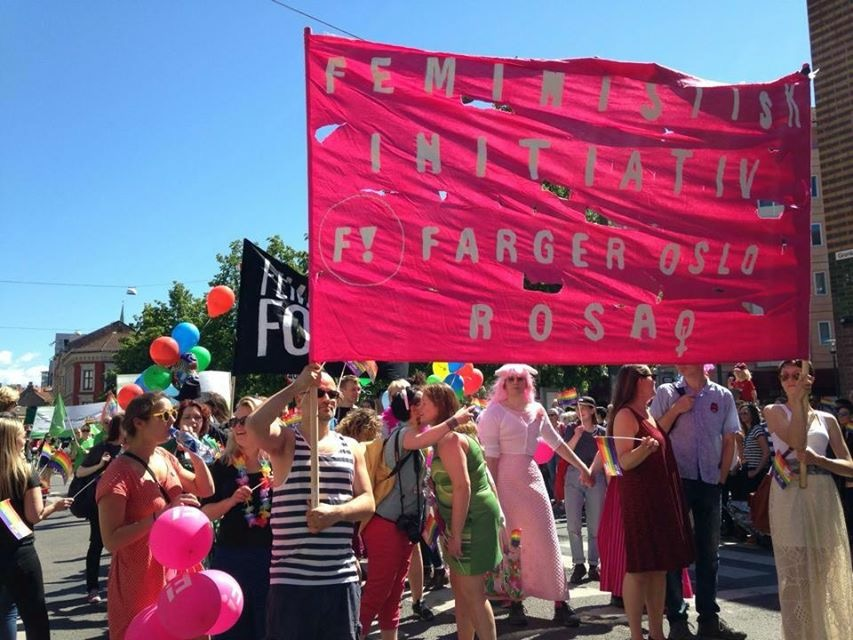
The party participating in a parade in Oslo in 2015

The party was founded in 2015, based on a party with the same name in Sweden. The Norwegian party ran during the 2015 local elections, with municipal lists in Oslo and Bergen, and a county list in Hordaland, but failed to win any seats. The party then ran for the 2017 parliamentary election, but, with only 696 votes, were far away from winning any seats. Feminist Initiative did not run during the 2019 local elections.
