= Erling Petersen =

Norwegian economist and politician

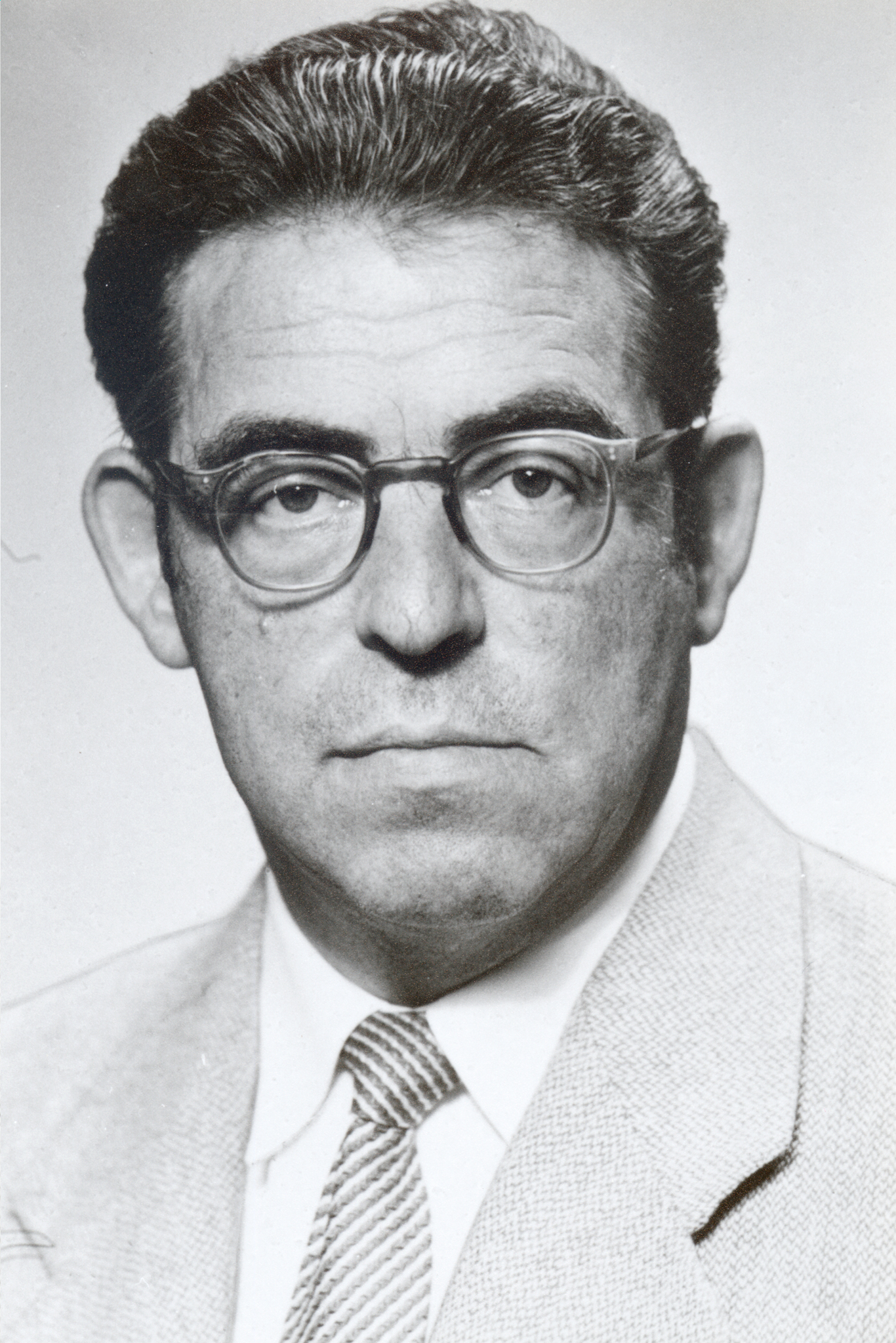
Petersen

Erling Petersen (13 July 1906 – 29 August 1992) was a Norwegian economist and politician for the Conservative Party.

He was born in Oslo.

He was elected to the Norwegian Parliament from Oslo in 1954, and was re-elected on four occasions. He had previously served in the position of deputy representative during the term 1950–1953.
