= Olaf Josef Johansen =

Norwegian politician

- Born: 30 May 1879; Christiania, Norway
- Died: 20 January 1962 (aged 82)
- Occupation: Politician
- Known for: Member of the Storting

Olaf Josef Johansen (30 May 1879 – 20 January 1962) was a Norwegian politician.

He was born in Christiania to Johan Johansen Reboli and Helene Marie Halvorsen. He was elected representative to the Storting from Oslo for five consecutive periods, first 1925–1927 and last time 1937–1945, for the Labour Party.
