= Britt Hildeng =

Norwegian politician (1943–2022)

Britt Hildeng (14 April 1943 – 12 September 2022) was a Norwegian politician for the Labour Party.

== Life and career ==
Hildeng was born in Oslo on 14 April 1943. She graduated as cand.polit. from the University of Oslo in 1969.

Hildeng was elected to the Norwegian Parliament from Oslo in 1997, and was re-elected on two occasions. At a local level, Hildeng held various positions in Oslo city council from 1971 to 1975 and 1991 to 1997. She chaired the local party chapter from 1993 to 2000. From 1995 to 2001, she was a member of the Labour Party central board. She died on 12 September 2022, at the age of 79.
