= Reidar Bruu =

Norwegian politician (1903–1989)

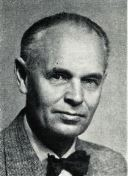
Reidar Bruu

Reidar Bruu (11 September 1903 – 2 November 1989) was a Norwegian politician for the Conservative Party.

Reidar Bruu was born in Kristiania. He was elected to the Norwegian Parliament from Oslo in 1958, and was re-elected on two occasions. He had previously served in the position of deputy representative during the term 1954–1957.

Bruu was a member of Oslo city council during the term 1951–1955.

From 1958 to 1969 he was a member of the national party board. He was a member of the council of the Norwegian Agency for Development Cooperation from 1962 to 1972, board chairman of Televerket from 1969 to 1973 and of the Norwegian National Opera from 1969 to 1975.
