= Helga Karlsen =

Norwegian politician (1882–1936)

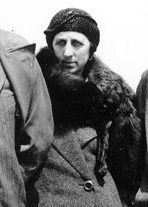
Helga Karlsen at the International Labour Conference in Geneva, Switzerland, 1935

Helga Aleksandra Karlsen (20 November 1882 – 15 October 1936) was a Norwegian politician for the Labour Party, and the party's first female Member of Parliament. Coming from humble origins, she gradually made her way up through the organisation of the labour movement. She served two non-consecutive periods in parliament (1927–30 and 1933–36), but died shortly before she could be elected for a third term. She has been called the Labour Party's foremost female politician in the interwar period.

== Early life and career ==
Karlsen was born in Oslo (at the time called Kristiania), to rail-road engineer Karl Arnesen (1860 – 1923) and Hilda Alette Torgersdatter (b. 1855). It seems as though her mother died while Helga was still young, and the girl had to go into foster care; in early records she appears under the name of Helga Pettersen. She started working at the age of fourteen, first as a maid, later in a café and in a candy factory. She then worked at a trading company for three years before entering into politics.

Karlsen had been involved in the labour movement since she first joined their theatre group in 1899. In the early 1920s, she was elected to the city council for the Labour Party. Here, among other things, she argued against municipal funding for the building of the so-called Markus Church on Grünerløkka, on the basis of the acute shortage of housing in the city. Karlsen was also deeply involved in the party's organisation of children's groups.

== Member of Parliament ==
In 1927 she was elected to Parliament as the first female representative of the Norwegian Labour Party.^{[a]} It was during this period that she was fined the sum of NOK 500, for donating money to striking construction workers. After a poor election for the party in 1930, she lost her position, but regained it in 1933. In the meanwhile she was, as the first woman ever, elected chairman of Oslo Arbeidersamfunn (Oslo Workers' Society) in 1932. In 1935 she participated at the International Labour Conference in Geneva, Switzerland. Here she delivered a well-received speech in favour of the 40-hour week.

In 1936, while running for a third term in Parliament, Karlsen fell ill. She was rarely unwell, but the busy schedule of the campaign had taken a great toll on her. She died only four days before the election. Karlsen was buried from the People's Houses in Oslo, where the eulogy was delivered by Martin Tranmæl. She was survived by her husband, Fredrik Emanuel Karlsen (1873 – 1942), whom she had met through the labour movement.
