= Guri Melby =

Norwegian politician (born 1981)

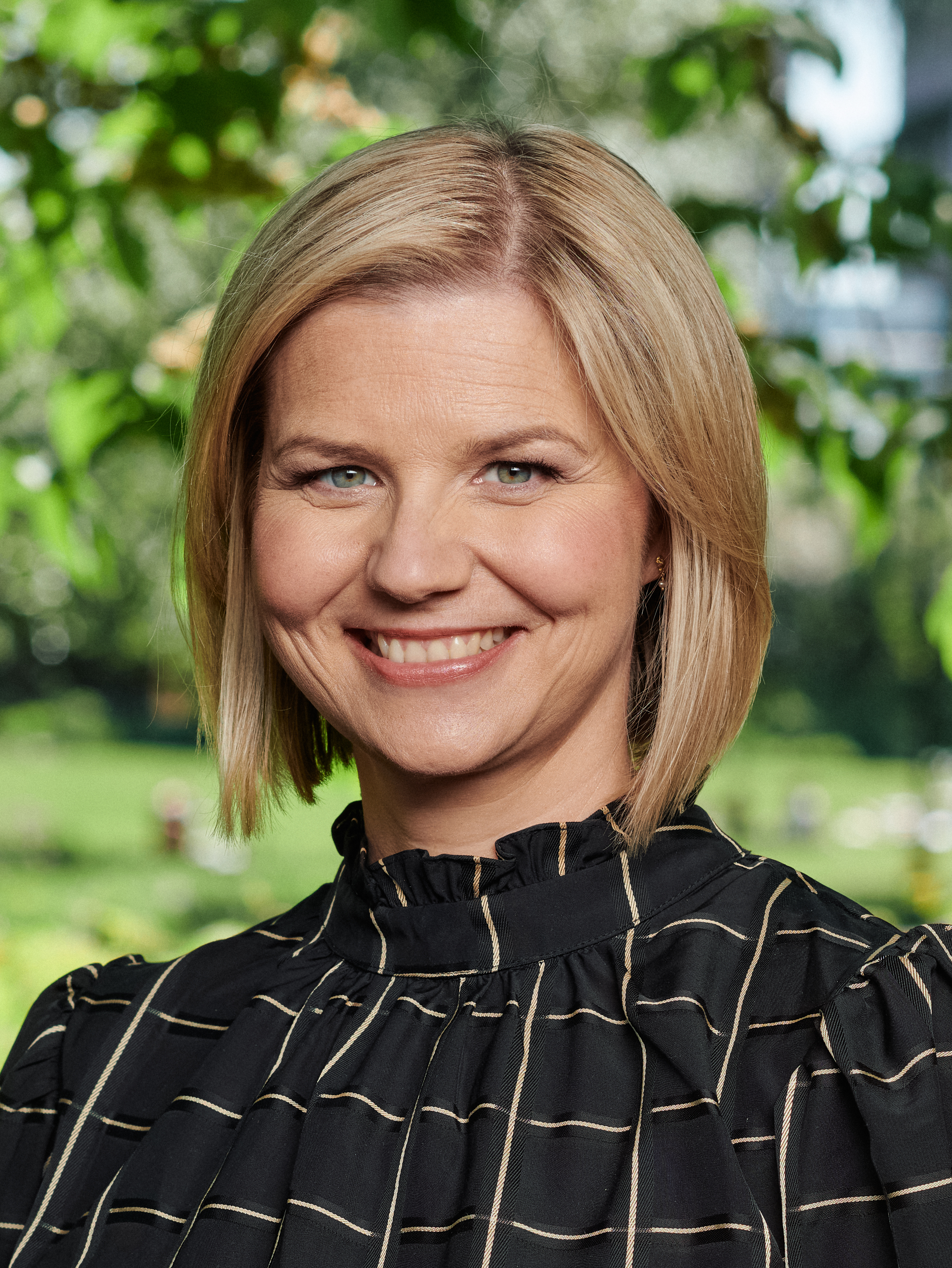
- Melby in 2023

Leader of the Liberal Party
- Incumbent
- Assumed office 26 September 2020
- First Deputy: Sveinung Rotevatn; Ingvild Wetrhus Thorsvik
- Second Deputy: Abid Raja
- Preceded by: Trine Skei Grande

Minister of Education and Integration
- In office 13 March 2020 – 14 October 2021
- Prime Minister: Erna Solberg
- Preceded by: Trine Skei Grande
- Succeeded by: Tonje Brenna

Member of the Storting
- Incumbent
- Assumed office 1 October 2021
- Deputy: Sofie Høgestøl
- Constituency: Oslo

Deputy Member of the Storting
- In office 1 October 2013 – 30 September 2021
- Member: Trine Skei Grande (2018–2020)
- Constituency: Oslo

Oslo City Commissioner for Transport and the Environment
- In office 15 October 2013 – 21 October 2015
- Governing Mayor: Stian Berger Røsland
- Preceded by: Ola Elvestuen
- Succeeded by: Lan Marie Berg

Personal details
- Born: 3 February 1981 (age 45) Orkdal Municipality, Sør-Trøndelag, Norway
- Party: Liberal
- Spouse: Thomas Hansen
- Children: 3
- Education: Norwegian University of Science and Technology
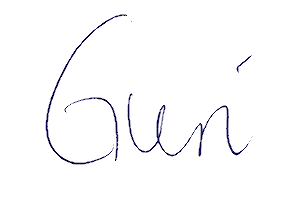
- Signature

Guri Melby (born 3 February 1981) is a Norwegian politician for the Liberal Party. She has served as the party leader since 2020 and Minister of Education from 2020 to 2021. She is also a member of parliament for Oslo since 2021, having previously been a deputy member for the same constituency between 2013 and 2021. Locally, she has also served as Oslo's City Commissioner for Transport and the Environment between 2013 and 2015.

== Personal life ==
She was born in Orkdal Municipality in Sør-Trøndelag county to Terje and Berit Melby, a bank clerk and school assistant. Currently, she is married to Thomas Hansen and has three children. The couple separated in 2020 before they got back together again in early November 2024.

== Career ==
=== Local politics ===
From 1999 to 2006 she was a member of the municipal council of Orkdal Municipality, and a member of the municipal council of Trondheim Municipality from 2007 to 2011. She was Venstre's top candidate in Sør-Trøndelag county in the elections for the Storting on 14 September 2009.

=== Parliament ===
She was a deputy member of the Storting from Oslo for the terms 2013–2017 and 2017–2021. When Trine Skei Grande was appointed to Solberg's Cabinet in 2018, Melby moved up to full representative, which she was until Grande resumed her duties in 2020. Melby was elected a regular representative in the 2021 election. In addition, she joined the Standing Committee on Foreign Affairs and Defence, also becoming its second vice chair.

In 2019, she and Petter Eide from the Socialist Left Party, demonstrated at Eidsvolls plass during the Norwegian reception of Li Zhanshu, the chairman of the National People's Congress's Standing Committee. Melby and Eide were asked to take off their yellow T-shirts with the inscription "freedom" in Norwegian and Mandarin before they could enter the Storting. Melby stated afterwards that it was "at best naive of the Storting to accept that our democratic rules are deceived by a manipulative system, at worst we have allowed ourselves to be dictated, and that is even worse".

=== Oslo City Commissioner ===
From October 2013 to 2015, she served as the Oslo city commissioner for public transport and environmental affairs. She took over from Ola Elvestuen, who had been elected to Parliament following the 2013 parliamentary election. She was succeeded by Lan Marie Nguyen Berg after the coalition was defeated following the 2015 local elections.

=== Minister of Education ===
Following Trine Skei Grande's decision to resign as minister and party leader in March 2020, Melby was asked by Grande personally if she wanted to succeed her as minister. She expressed sorrow by Grande's resignation, saying that "being education minister was her dream job". Her appointment also coincided with the lockdown and closing of schools in Norway due to the COVID-19 pandemic.

In January 2021, she went against professional advice to exclude homeschool for students, despite the infection level being at yellow. She was criticised by many educational experts for her decision, but she defended it by saying that it would be up to the schools respectively to decide and notify their county governor about it. She was however supported by the lecturer team, the Education Association and the Oslo City Commission for Knowledge and Education.

On 8 February, she announced that exams for departing students in lower secondary and upper secondary would be cancelled. However, oral exams would still go ahead for tenth graders' on lower secondary and year three in upper secondary. Melby stated: "We would very much like to have completed all the exams as planned. There have been some very different offers of education for the pupils this school year, which provides a different basis for assessment. A common and equal written exam is therefore no longer a suitable test of what the students have learned".

In March, she expressed that close contacts in schools needed to be reduced and encouraged schools to borrow premises if necessary. She also stressed the importance to keep students physically at school as much as possible. She also expressed scepticism to Oslo's Knowledge and Education Commissioner's proposal to keep schools in Oslo at a yellow level.

In late March, she caused controversy when she suggested establishing a new school subject in upper secondary schools focusing on democracy, equality and ethical issues, allegedly replacing or overriding the history subject. She quickly apologised for her statement, and said it came out wrong. The leader of the Norwegian Lecturer Team, Rita Helgesen, criticised Melby, stating that she had created a new subject that was not a subject at all. The Conservative's Turid Kristensen also criticised Melby, stating that they didn't want to build down common subjects.

Following the cabinet's defeat at the 2021 election, she was succeeded by Tonje Brenna on 14 October.

=== Party leadership ===
On 19 August 2020, she announced her intention to stand for the Liberal leadership following Grande's resignation. She became the third person after Sveinung Rotevatn and Abid Raja to announce their run for the leadership. She told reporters that she had sought advice from Grande herself and did not exclude seeking advice from her if she became leader. On 23 August, she was unanimously designated leader of the Liberal Party by the party's election committee, with Sveinung Rotevatn and Abid Raja as first and second deputy leaders. At the party conference in September, she was unanimously elected party leader, with Rotevatn and Raja as deputy leaders.

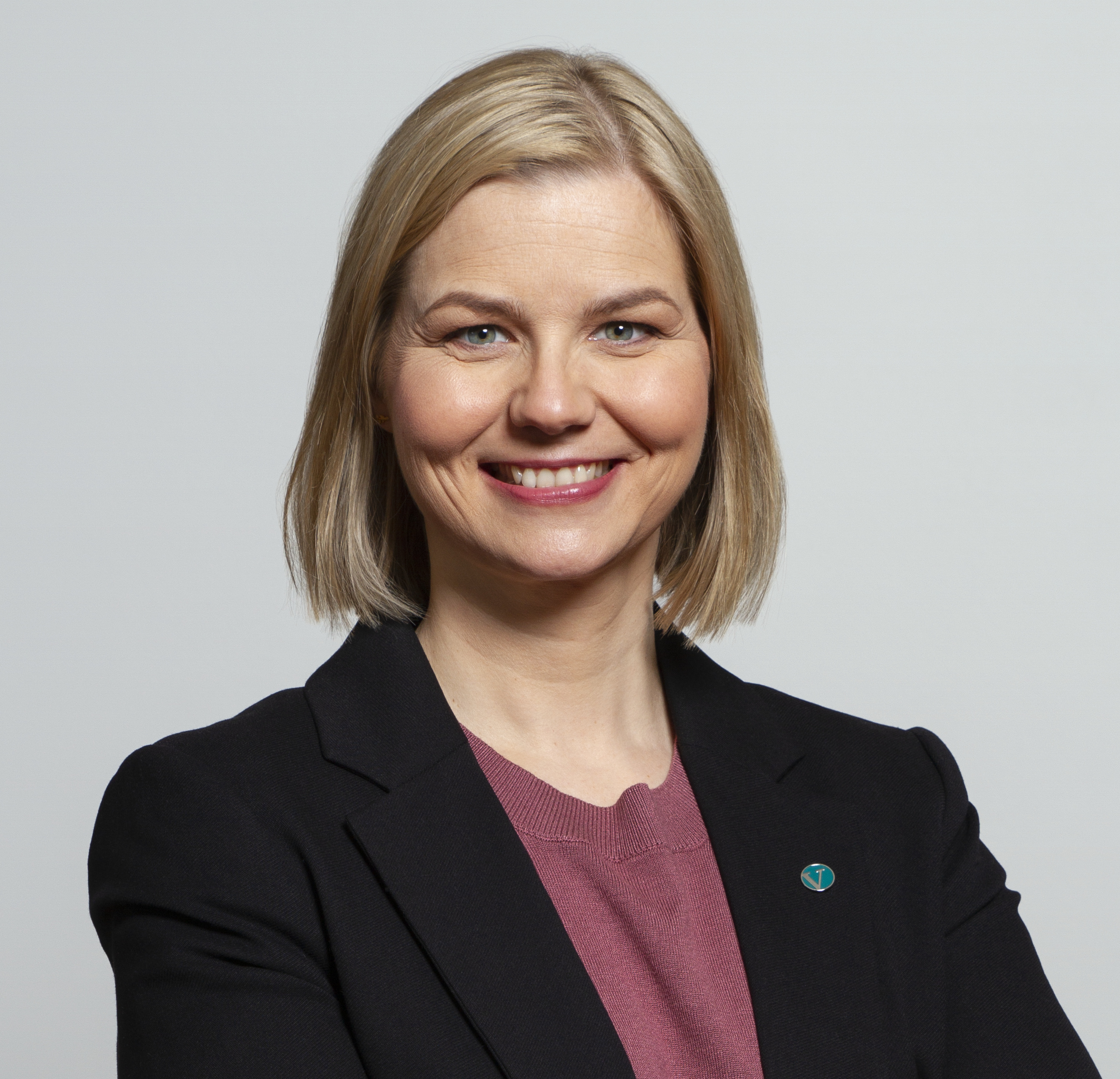
Melby in 2021

In April 2021, she called on the leader of the Labour Party, Jonas Gahr Støre, to support the governing parties’ drug reform, which already had the support of the Socialist Left Party. She expressed that "the Labour Party now has the opportunity to show that they support ordinary people, and that it’s not just empty words and rhetoric. If Jonas Gahr Støre supports this reform, he should go in front and lead the way". Following the Labour Party's conference, where Støre announced he would not be supporting the drug reform, Melby stated that Støre had shown his true self, and called him a "defender of moralism". She further stated that the party "is pursuing a drug policy that is failing and has negative consequences".

In November, after minister of culture Anette Trettebergstuen stated that no members of the government or representatives of the state would attend the 2022 FIFA World Cup in Qatar, Melby praised Trettebergstuen, while adding that no members of the Storting should attend the event either.

In June 2022, Melby reiterated the Ukrainian ambassador's sentiment that the Norwegian government should be harsher against Russia. She noted that Norway should block Russian vessels from entering Norwegian waters, saying: "As long as Russia blocks Ukrainian vessels from going to port in Ukraine, the Russians should not be allowed to use Norwegian ports". She also praised the ambassador, noting: "Sanctions must cost us a little too, otherwise they do not have the effect we want. The fact that the government is undermining the sanctions to prevent the economic loss from becoming too great for us only contributes to financing Putin's war machine even further. Norway should not be responsible for that".

In her speech to her party's congress, Melby urged Conservative Party leader Erna Solberg to vote with the Liberal Party to close down the Wisting oil field, saying: "If you really think that the tax package was unnecessary, join the Liberal Party, then we will vote against this expansion".

Short time after Une Aina Bastholm's departure as Green Party leader, Melby and her party put through several changes to accommodate work schedules for employees with children. Some of these changes included a set time frame for group meetings, to not work beyond the scheduled working hours, time off for overtime work, and forbidding deadlines of big projects for the day after.

On 30 September, she and Progress Party leader Sylvi Listhaug called for more weapons shipments to Ukraine in the wake of Russia annexing four regions in Ukraine. Melby stated: "Today, Russia will illegally annex Ukrainian territories. This takes the war into a new phase. Putin removes the small glimmer of hope for a negotiated solution, and warns that the war will last a long time. It is more important than ever that the West supplies Ukraine with what it needs to fight back against Russia and win back its territory".

Melby was re-elected as leader in October 2022.

On 19 November 2023, Melby declared her candidacy for Prime Minister in an attempt to appeal to voters from the right wing-bloc who were dissatisfied with Erna Solberg's intentions of running for the post again in the 2025 election. Polling from early November 2023 had the Liberal Party at 6.4%, with the Conservative Party at 24% and the Labour Party at 20%. The Green Party leader Arild Hermstad expressed support for Melby's candidacy, calling it "a good idea".

Political offices
Preceded by Ola Elvestuen	Oslo City Commissioner for Transport and the Environment; 2013–2015	Succeeded by Lan Marie Berg
Preceded by Trine Skei Grande	Minister of Education; 2020–2021	Succeeded by Tonje Brenna
Preceded by Christian Tybring-Gjedde	Second Vice Chair of the Standing Committee on Foreign Affairs and Defence; 2021–present	Incumbent
Party political offices
Preceded by Trine Skei Grande	Leader of the Liberal Party; 2020–present	Incumbent
