= Aase Lionæs =

Norwegian politician

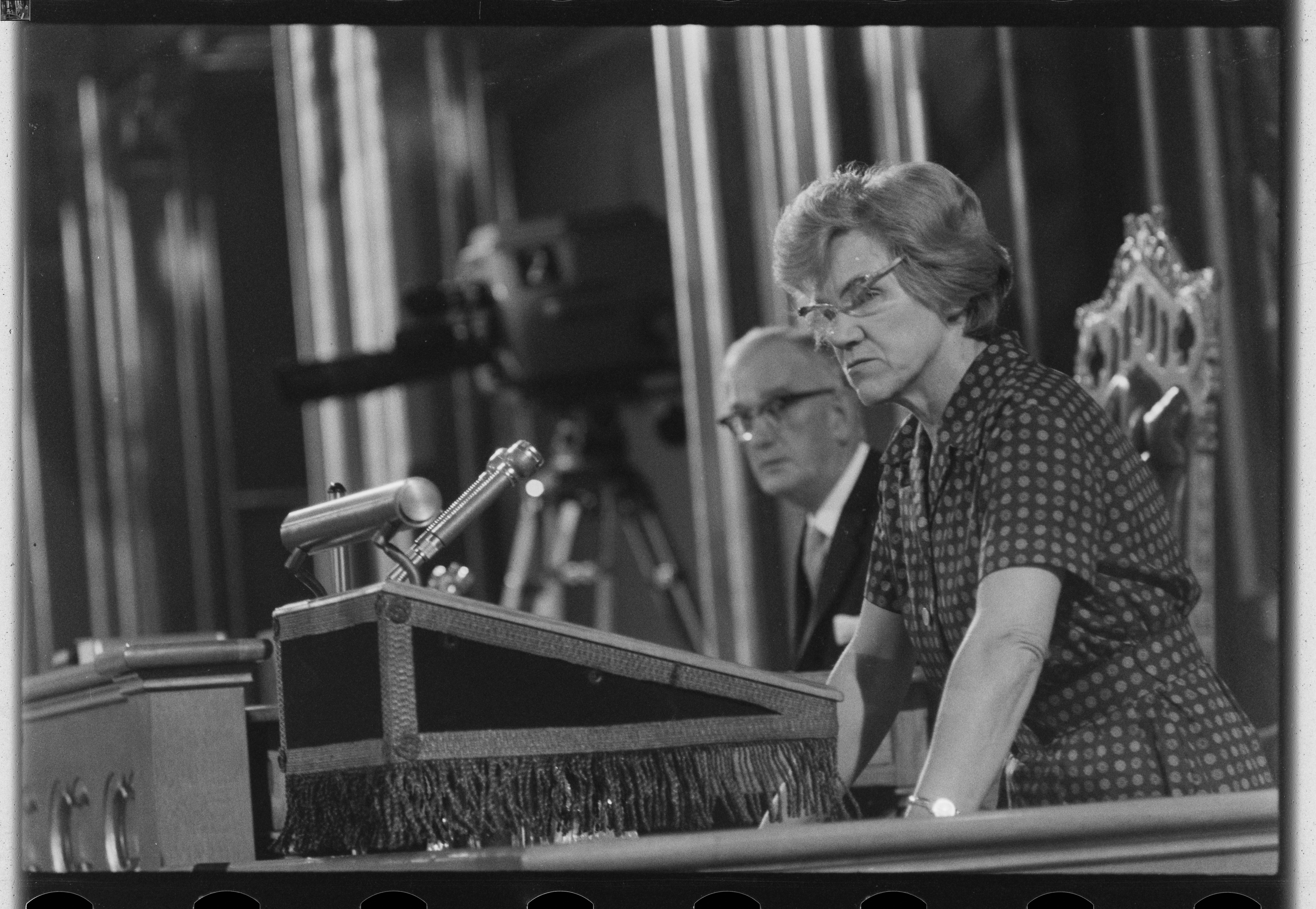
- Lionæs during a debate in the Storting in 1963.

Vice President of the Odelsting
- In office 9 October 1973 – 30 September 1977
- President: Per Borten
- Preceded by: Erland Steenberg
- Succeeded by: Per Karstensen

Vice President of the Lagting
- In office 8 October 1965 – 30 September 1973
- President: Bent Røiseland; Lars Korvald; Egil Aarvik
- Preceded by: Einar Hareide
- Succeeded by: Egil Aarvik

Member of the Norwegian Parliament
- In office 1 January 1958 – 30 September 1977
- Constituency: Oslo

Personal details
- Born: 10 April 1907 Oslo, Norway
- Died: 2 January 1999 (aged 91) Oslo, Norway
- Party: Labour
- Spouse: Kurt Jonas (m. 1938)

Aase Wind Lionæs (10 April 1907 – 2 January 1999) was a Norwegian politician for the Labour Party, and a socialist feminist.

== Biography ==
Lionæs was born in Oslo. She was a member of Oslo city council during the terms 1934–1937 and 1945–1947. In 1946 she was one of the delegates of the United Nations General Assembly.

She was elected to the Norwegian Parliament from Oslo in 1958, and was re-elected on four occasions. She had previously served in the position of deputy representative during the term 1954–1957, during which she met as a regular representative for Rakel Seweriin and later Einar Gerhardsen who both held positions in the Cabinet. She was also a member of the Norwegian Nobel Committee from 1948 to 1968 and its head from 1968 to 1978. She also served as vice president of the Lagting from 1965 to 1973 and of the Odelsting from 1973 to 1977.

She founded the friendship association Friends of Israel in the Norwegian Labour Movement (Norwegian: Venner av Israel i Norsk Arbeiderbevegelse).

Cultural offices
Preceded by Bernt Ingvaldsen	Chairman of the Norwegian Nobel Committee; 1968–1978	Succeeded by John Sanness
