= Finn Moe =

Norwegian journalist and politician (1902–1971)

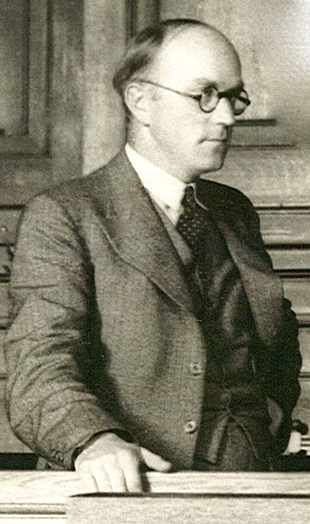
Finn Moe, c. 1933

Finn Moe (12 October 1902 – 6 August 1971) was a Norwegian journalist and politician for the Labour Party.

He was born in Bergen as a son of dentist Halfdan Moe (1855–1922) and Gertrud née Gullachsen (1860–1921). He finished his secondary education in Rouen in 1922 and studied in Paris until 1927, graduating from Sorbonne University. His thesis was published in Norwegian as Pragmatismen. Det indiske demokratis filosofi, and earned him the Monrad Gold Medal.

In 1927 he was hired as Berlin correspondent for the newspaper Arbeiderbladet, before moving home to manage Arbeidernes Pressekontor from 1929. In 1932 he was hired as foreign affairs journalist in Arbeiderbladet, and from 1936 he doubled as editor-in-chief of the periodical Det 20de Århundre. Moe became one of the most central foreign affairs ideologues in the Labour Party, holding membership in the party's international committee from 1930 to 1968 and executive committee member of the Second International from 1938 to 1940. He was also deputy chairman of the Workers' Youth League from 1934 to 1937, and deputy member of the Labour Party central board from 1939 to 1945.

During the Second World War, Moe fled German-occupied Norway, first to Stockholm. Landing in the United States, he headed the Norwegian Broadcasting from 1941 to 1943. From 1943 to 1945 he was a press consultant in the exiled Norwegian Ministry of Foreign Affairs, seated in London. Moe was an avid proponent of Trans-Atlantic cooperation, even a federation. In 1945 he took part in the United Nations Preparatory Commission in London, moving over to New York City in 1946 to become Norway's permanent delegate to the United Nations. He sat on the United Nations Economic and Social Council from 1946 to 1947 and the UN Security Council from 1948 to 1949. His tenure as permanent delegate to the United Nations ended in 1949, when he came home to Norway and was hired as foreign affairs editor of Arbeiderbladet. In 1948–49 Moe had become a proponent of non-alignment, like Trygve Lie, favoring a Scandinavian defence cooperation instead of NATO membership.

He was a deputy representative to the Parliament of Norway from Oslo during the term 1945–1949. He was then elected to Parliament in 1949, and was re-elected on four occasions in 1953, 1957, 1961 and 1965, retiring in 1969. In his first four terms he chaired the Standing Committee on Constitutional and Foreign Affairs and the Enlarged Foreign Affairs Committee. The period also coincided with Labour Party government, with Halvard Lange as stalwart Minister of Foreign Affairs throughout twenty years. In his fifth term Finn Moe was deputy leader of both committees. Moe also represented Norway in the Council of Europe from 1950 to 1969, serving as vice praeses in 1951–52 and 1963–64. From 1959 to 1962 he was an executive committee member of the International Parliamentary Union, also chairing the Norwegian delegation from 1961 to 1969.

Within the foreign affairs field Moe was also a member of the Advisory Committee from 1958 to 1969, chaired the board of NUPI from 1959 to 1971, was a member of the Norwegian National UNESCO Commission from 1961 to 1971, the Rådet for konflikt- og fredsforskning from 1963 to 1971 and deputy chair of Norsk utviklingshjelp from 1963 to 1969. Moe was also involved in nuclear energy and civil aviation. He was a member of the Statens atomenergiråd from 1955 to 1971 and the Nordic Cooperation Committee for Peaceful Exploitation of Nuclear Energy from 1956 to 1962; and in Det Norske Luftfartsselskap he was a deputy board member from 1956 to 1966, and in Scandinavian Airlines Systems he was a board member from 1958 to 1960.
