= Paul Thyness =

Norwegian politician

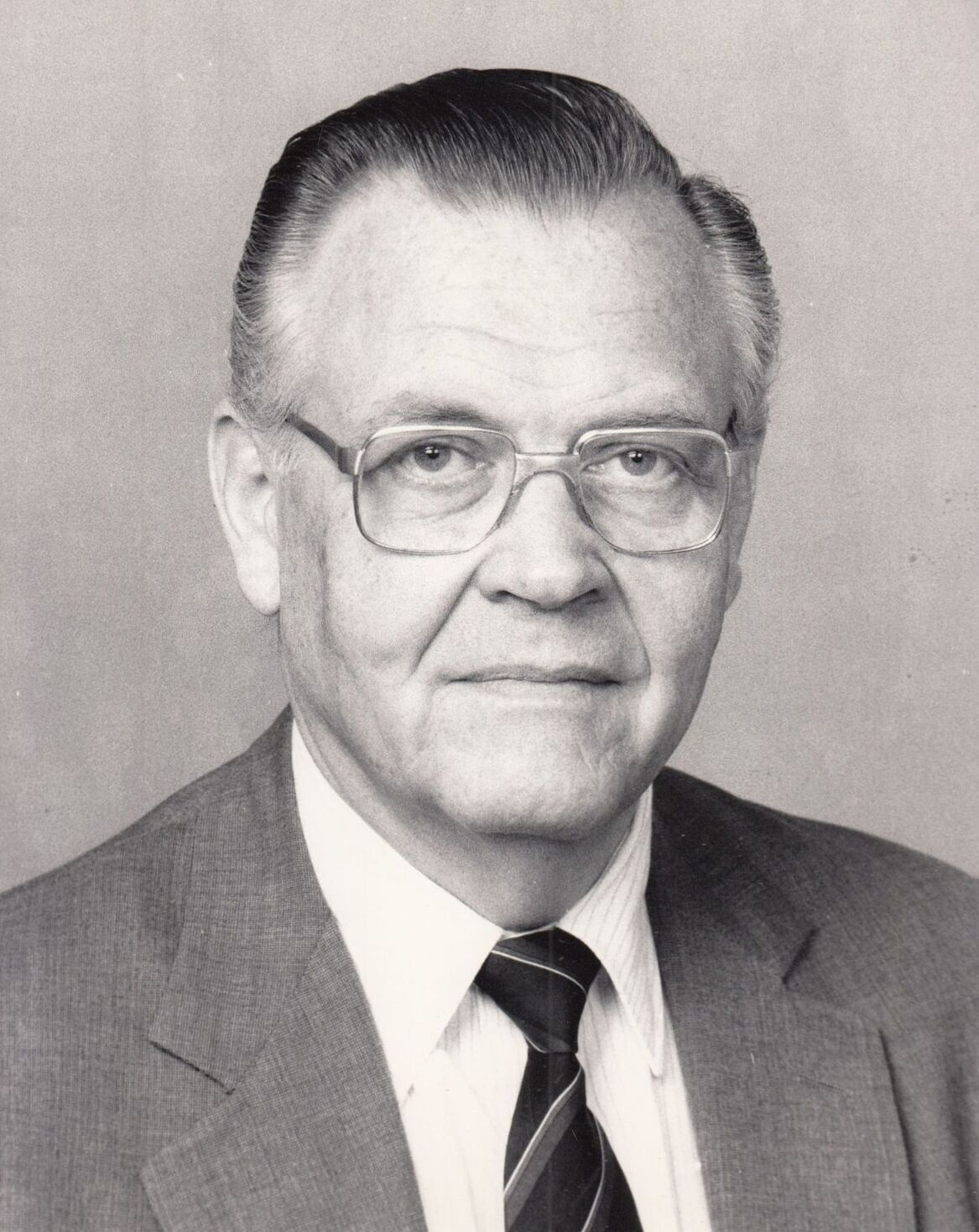
- Thyness, c. 1987

Personal details
- Born: 10 April 1930
- Died: 30 March 2016 (aged 85)
- Education: University of Oslo

Paul Thyness (10 April 1930 in Aker, Norway – 30 March 2016 in Oslo) was a Norwegian politician for the Conservative Party.

In 1955 he graduated with the cand.philol. degree and majoring in political science at the University of Oslo. He was a member of the board of Norwegian Institute of International Affairs (NUPI) from 1972 to 1977 and from 1988 to 1992. He authored a number of books.

In 1963, during the short-lived Lyng's Cabinet, he was appointed State Secretary in the Office of the Prime Minister. He was elected to the Storting (Parliament of Norway) from Oslo in 1965, and was re-elected on three occasions. He was a co-founder of Friends of Israel in the Parliament of Norway in 1974, and chairman of the caucus from 1977 to 1980.

Paul Thyness was Assistant Administrator of the United Nations Development Programme (UNDP) and head of the Bureau for Special Activities of the UNDP in New York from 1980 to 1988.
