= Karin Hafstad =

Norwegian politician (1936–2019)

Karin Hafstad (8 June 1936, Oslo – 27 May 2019) was a Norwegian politician for the Conservative Party.

She was elected to the Parliament of Norway from Oslo in 1973, and was re-elected on one occasion.

On the local level she was a member of Oslo city council from 1967 to 1975. She was a member of the central party board of the Norwegian Young Conservatives from 1965 to 1969 and of the national Conservative Party board from 1966 to 1969.

Outside politics she spent much of her professional career as a consultant in the Directorate of Public Roads.
