= Arthur Nordlie =

Norwegian politician

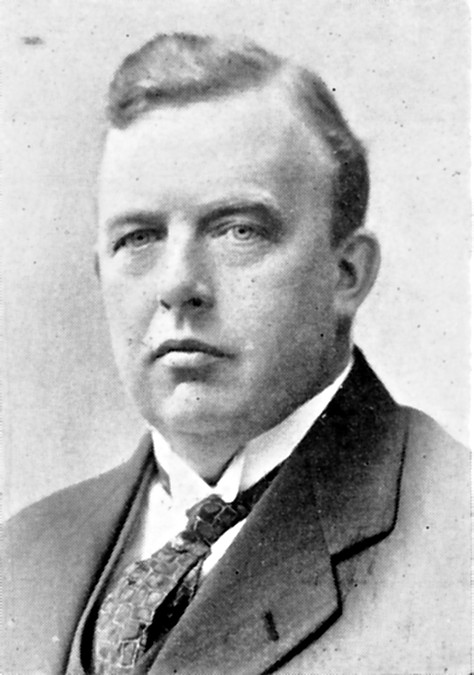
Arthur Nordlie.

Arthur Henry Eugen Nordlie (2 February 1883 in Oslo – 7 January 1965) was a Norwegian politician for the Conservative Party.

He was elected to the Norwegian Parliament from Oslo in 1928, and was re-elected on three occasions. He had previously served in the position of deputy representative during the term 1925–1927.

Nordlie was a member of Oslo city council from 1919 to 1940, as well as for a period after the German occupation of Norway.

Party political offices
Preceded by Ole Ludvig Bærøe	Chairman of the Norwegian Conservative Party; 1945–1950	Succeeded by Carl Joachim Hambro
