= Agnes Nærland Viljugrein =

Norwegian politician (born 1997)

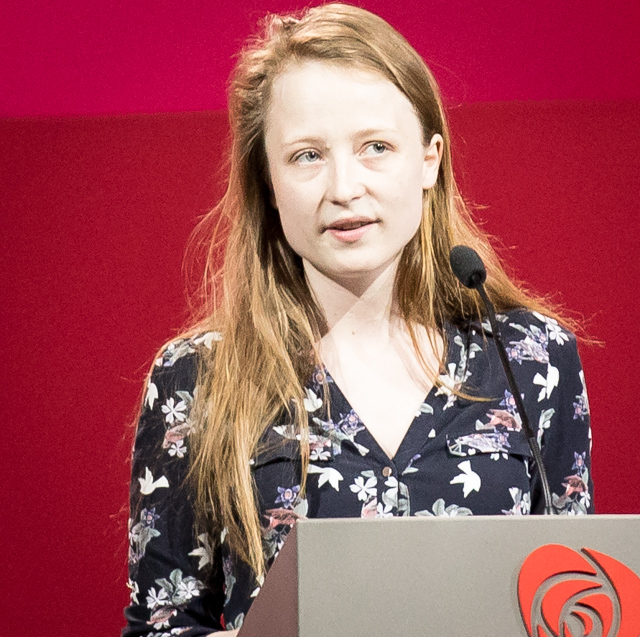

Agnes Nærland Viljugrein (born 18 January 1997) is a Norwegian politician for the Labour Party.

She hails from Tøyen, Oslo. After she became active in the Workers' Youth League, the youth wing of the Labour Party, she was nominated on the ballot for the 2021 Norwegian parliamentary election. Her election campaign was among those documented by NRK and shown in the documentary Folkevalgt. She was elected as a deputy representative to the Parliament of Norway from Oslo for the term 2021–2025. In 2024 she surpassed 100 days of parliamentary session.

In the 2023 Norwegian local elections, Viljugrein was elected to the borough council of Gamle Oslo, and became its leader.
