= People's Party FNB =

Norwegian political party

People's Party FNB Folkets parti FNB
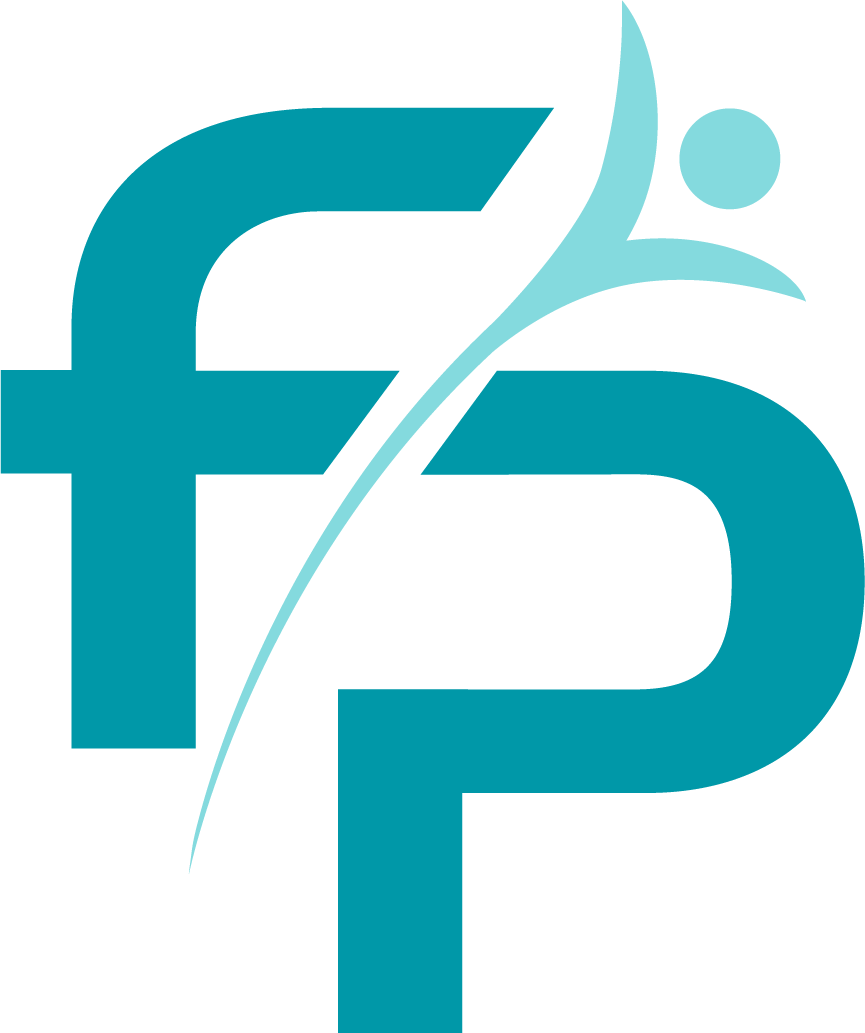
- Leader: Frode Myrhol and Cecilie Lyngby
- Founded: December 12, 2014; 11 years ago
- Headquarters: Stavanger
- Ideology: Single-issue (anti-road tolls)
- Parliament: 0 / 169
- County councils: 17 / 574
- Municipal councils: 0 / 9,387

Website
- neitilmerbompenger.no

Former party logo

The People's Party FNB (Norwegian: Folkets parti FNB), until 2022 known as the People's Action No to More Road Tolls (Norwegian: Folkeaksjonen nei til mer bompenger, FNB), is a political party in Norway. The single-issue party's stance is that road construction should be entirely funded through ordinary taxes and road tolls should be abolished. The party was founded in 2014 in Stavanger as a reaction to the plans to erect a toll ring in Stavanger/Sandnes. Starting as a people's action, it was reformed as a party and ran in the 2015 municipal elections, winning three municipal councilors. It was initially led by Frode Myrhol. At its first party convention, in 2020, a dispute around the leadership role led to the party opting to have two joint party leaders, Frode Myrhol and Cecilie Lyngby.

For the 2019 election, the party ran for eleven municipal and five county elections, winning seats in all locations, 51 in municipal and 17 in county councils. The highest results were achieved with 22.1 percent in Alver Municipality, 16.7 percent in Bergen Municipality, and as low as 1.5 percent in Vestfold og Telemark county.

Support for the party plummeted during the 2021 parliamentary election, with the party only receiving 3,435 votes or 0.1 percent of the popular vote, placing the party as Norway's 18th largest.

The party changed its name from People's Action No to More Road Tolls to People's Party FNB in February 2022.

== Results ==
Election results in the 2019 municipal elections:

| Municipality | Popular vote | % | Seats |
|---|---|---|---|
| Alver Municipality | 3,440 | 22.1 | 10 |
| Askøy Municipality | 1,149 | 8.0 | 3 |
| Bergen Municipality | 25,053 | 16.7 | 11 |
| Klepp Municipality | 519 | 5.5 | 2 |
| Porsgrunn Municipality | 465 | 2.7 | 1 |
| Oslo Municipality | 21,346 | 5.8 | 4 |
| Sandnes Municipality | 3,368 | 9.1 | 5 |
| Skien Municipality | 557 | 2.2 | 1 |
| Sola Municipality | 1,335 | 10.1 | 4 |
| Stavanger Municipality | 6,612 | 9.2 | 6 |
| Øygarden Municipality | 1,456 | 8.0 | 4 |

Results from the 2019 county elections:

| County | Popular vote | % | Seats |
|---|---|---|---|
| Oslo | 21,346 | 5.8 | 4 |
| Rogaland | 14,066 | 6.4 | 3 |
| Vestfold og Telemark | 2,957 | 1.5 | 1 |
| Vestland | 28,236 | 9.1 | 6 |
| Viken | 19,299 | 3.5 | 3 |
