= 2019 Norwegian local elections =

2019 election for the municipalities and counties of Norway

← 2015	9 September 2019	2023 →
- Turnout: 64.7% ▲5.0 pp
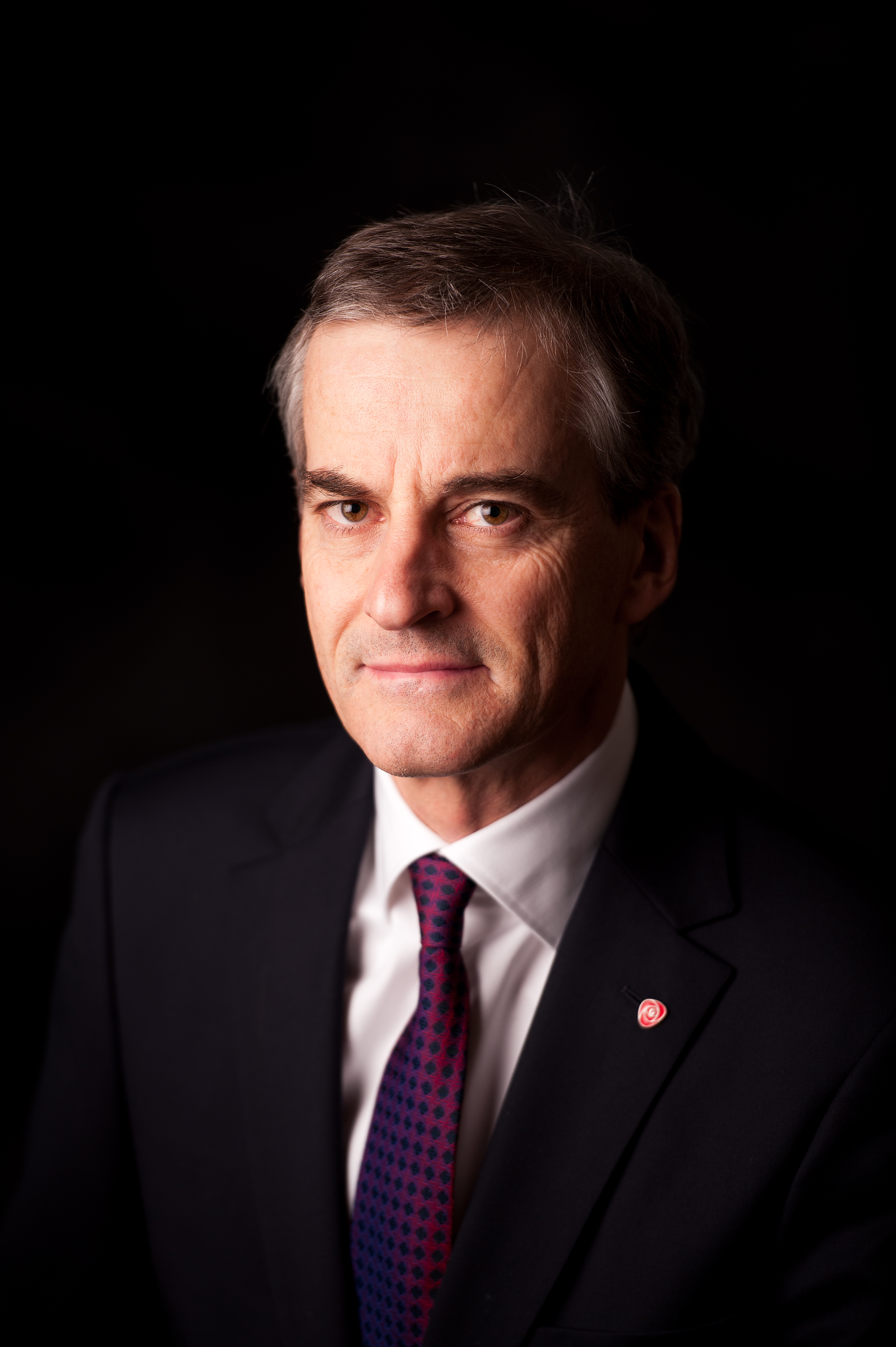

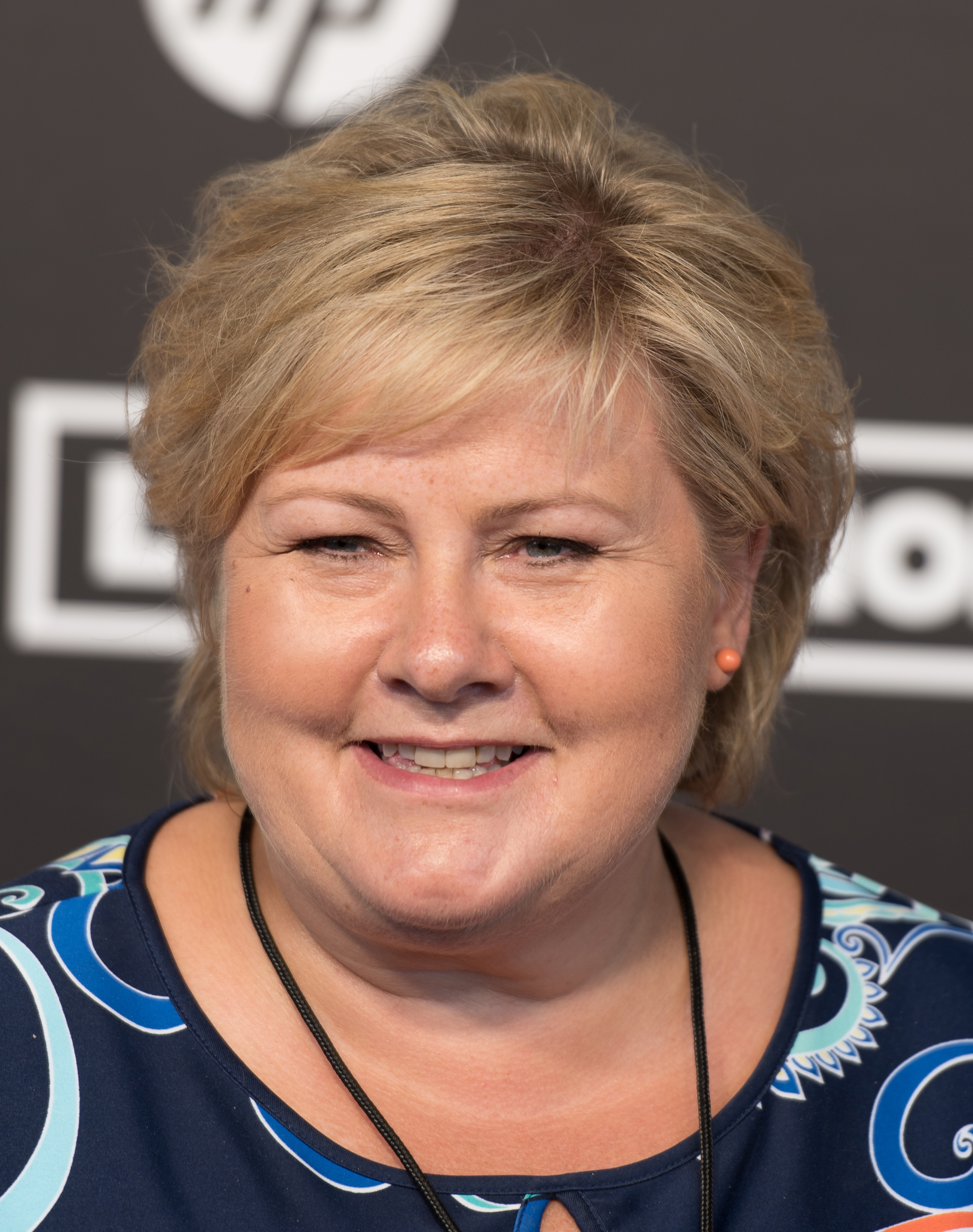

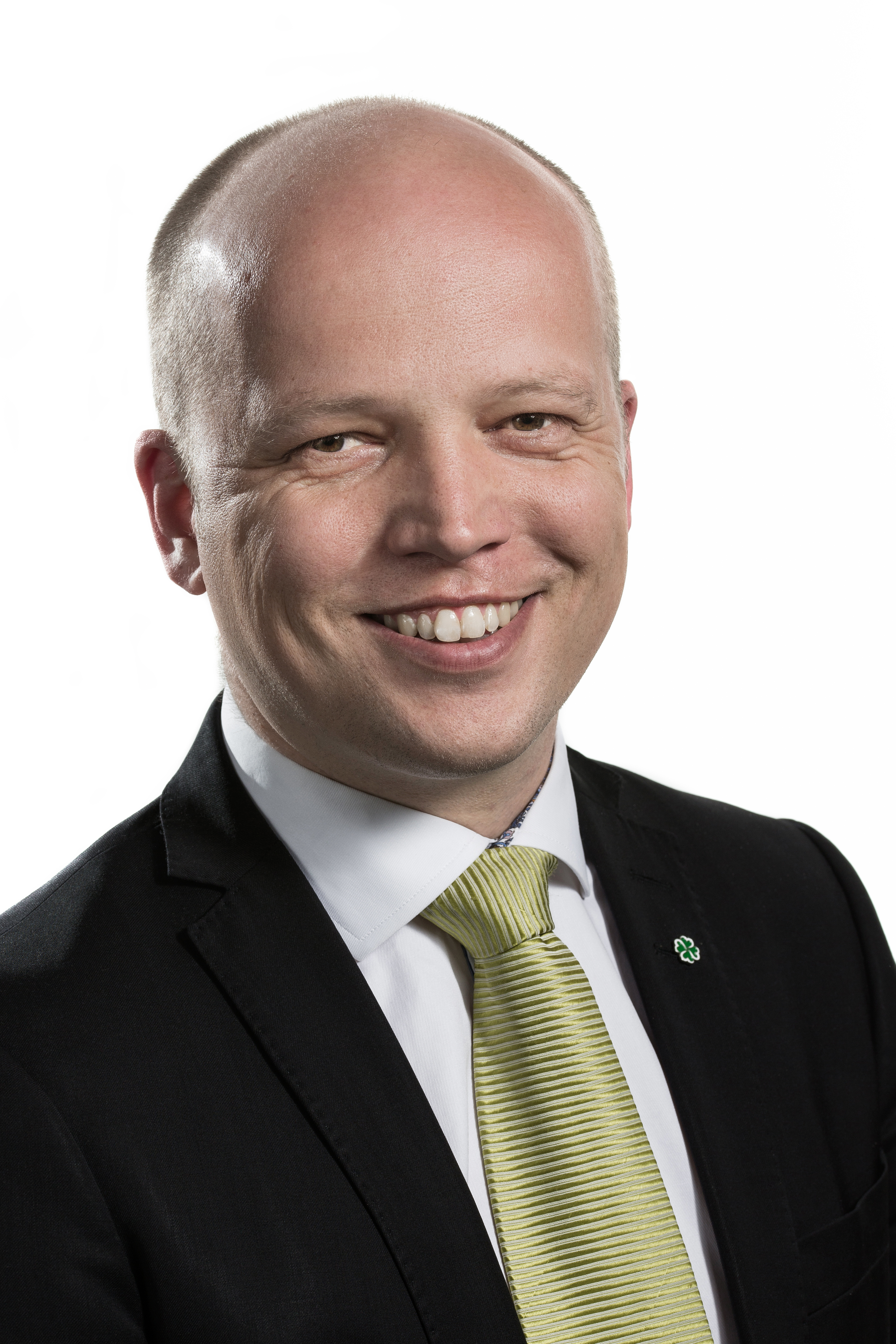

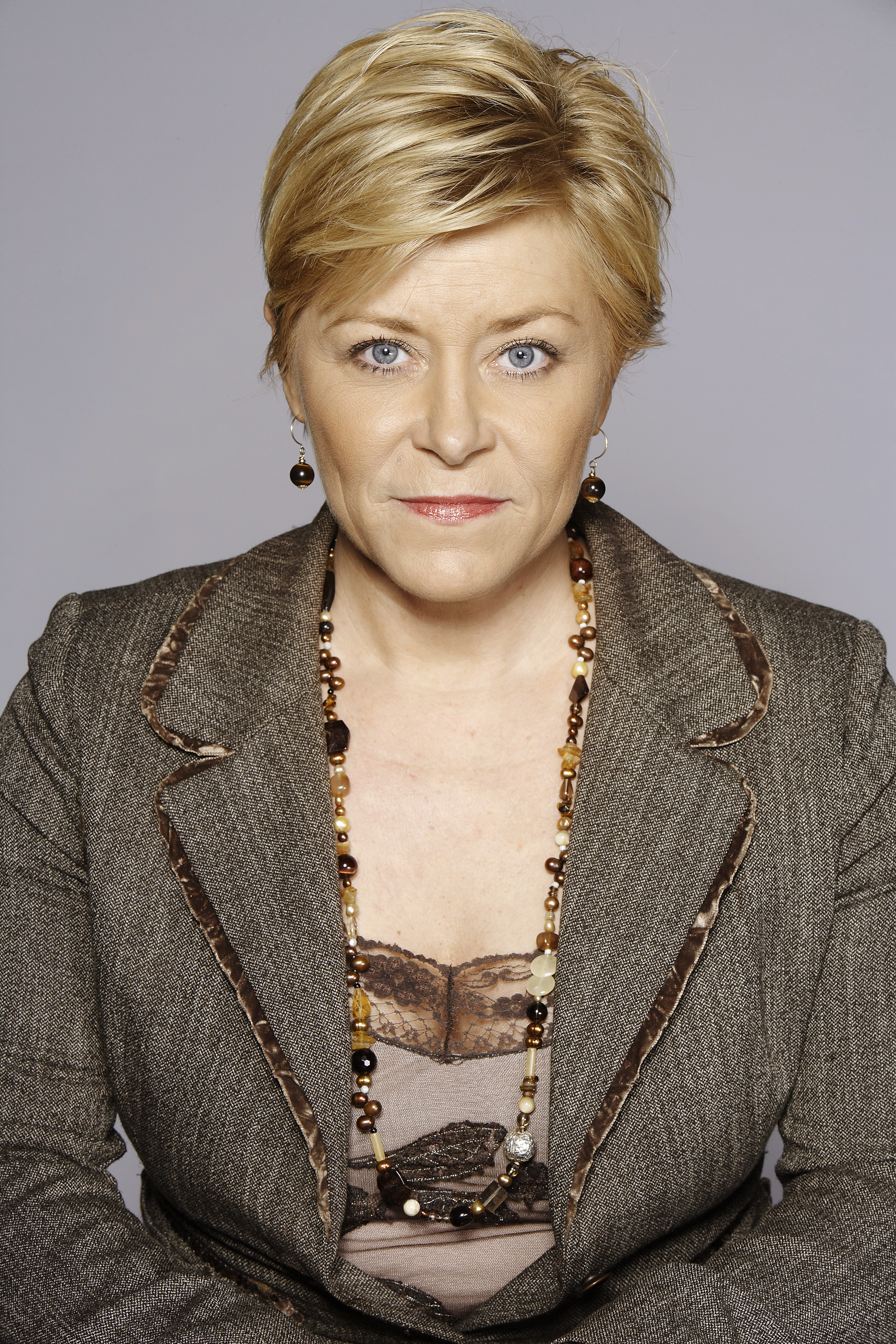

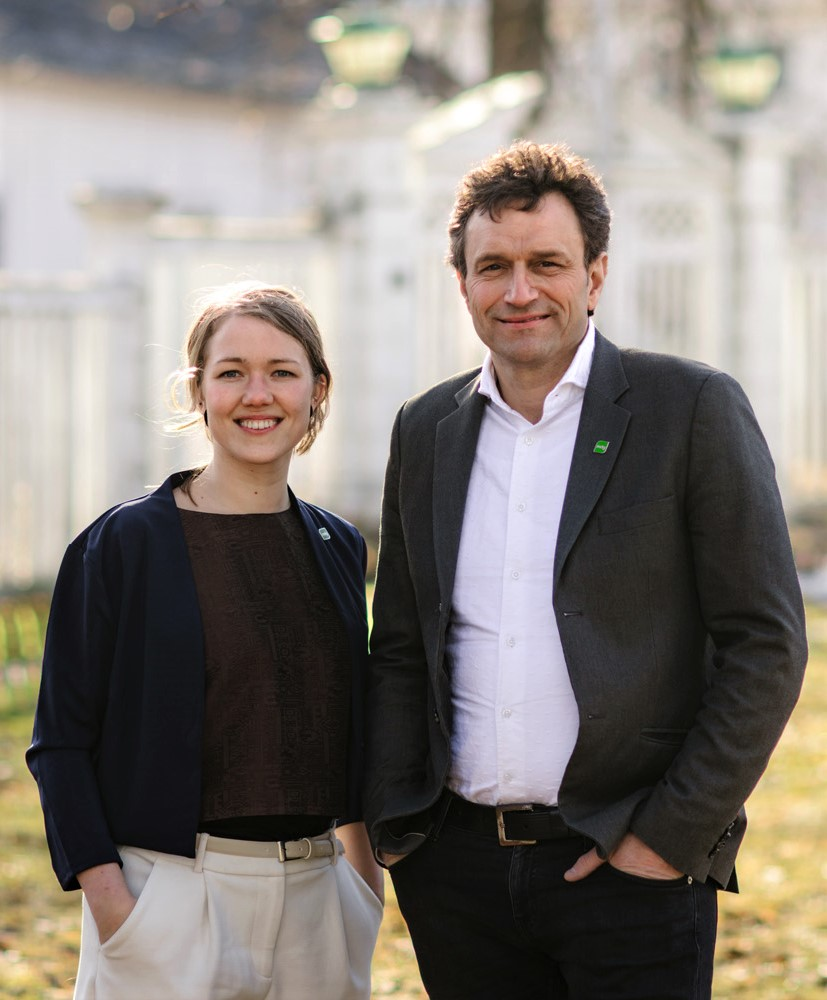

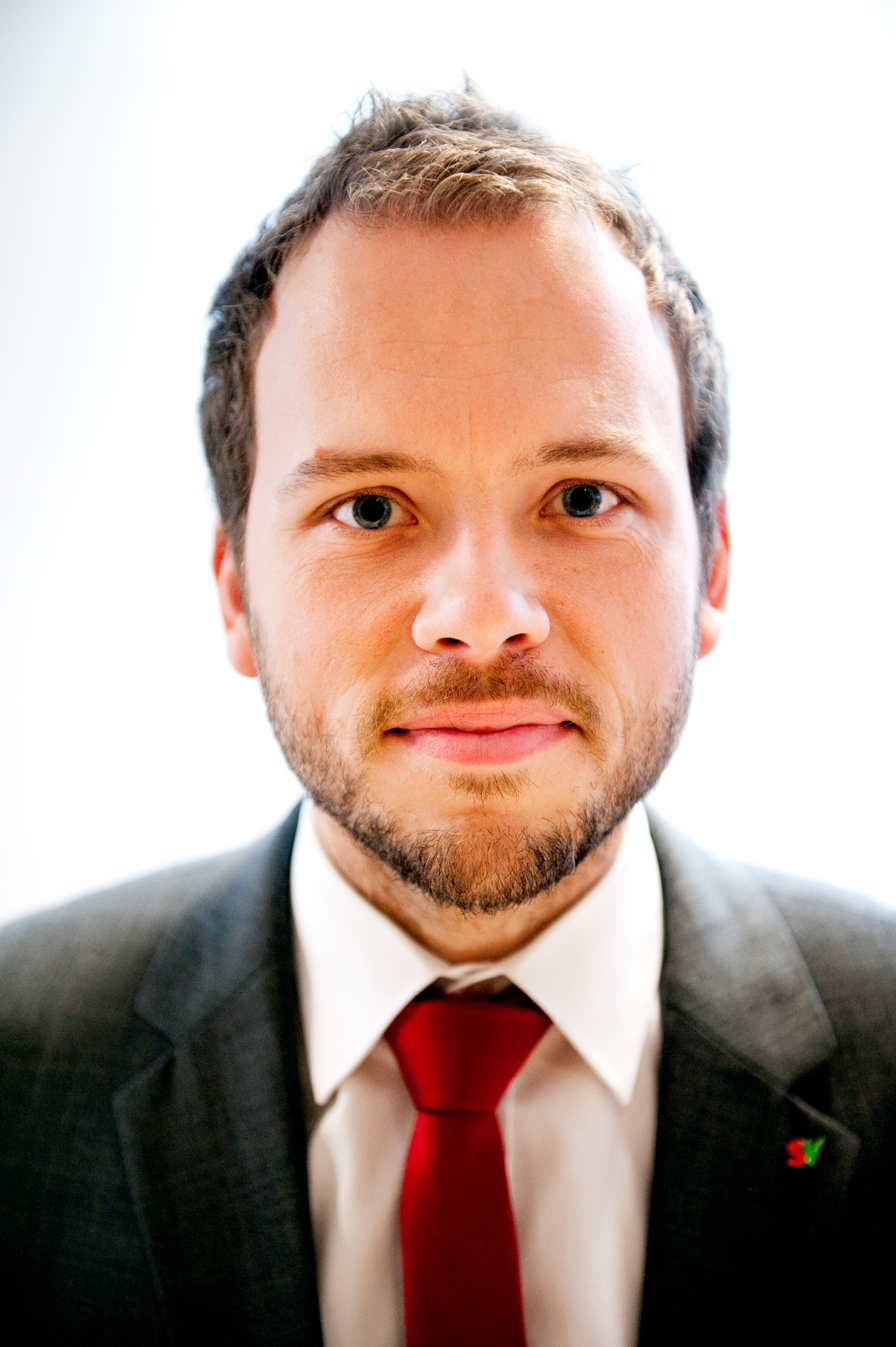

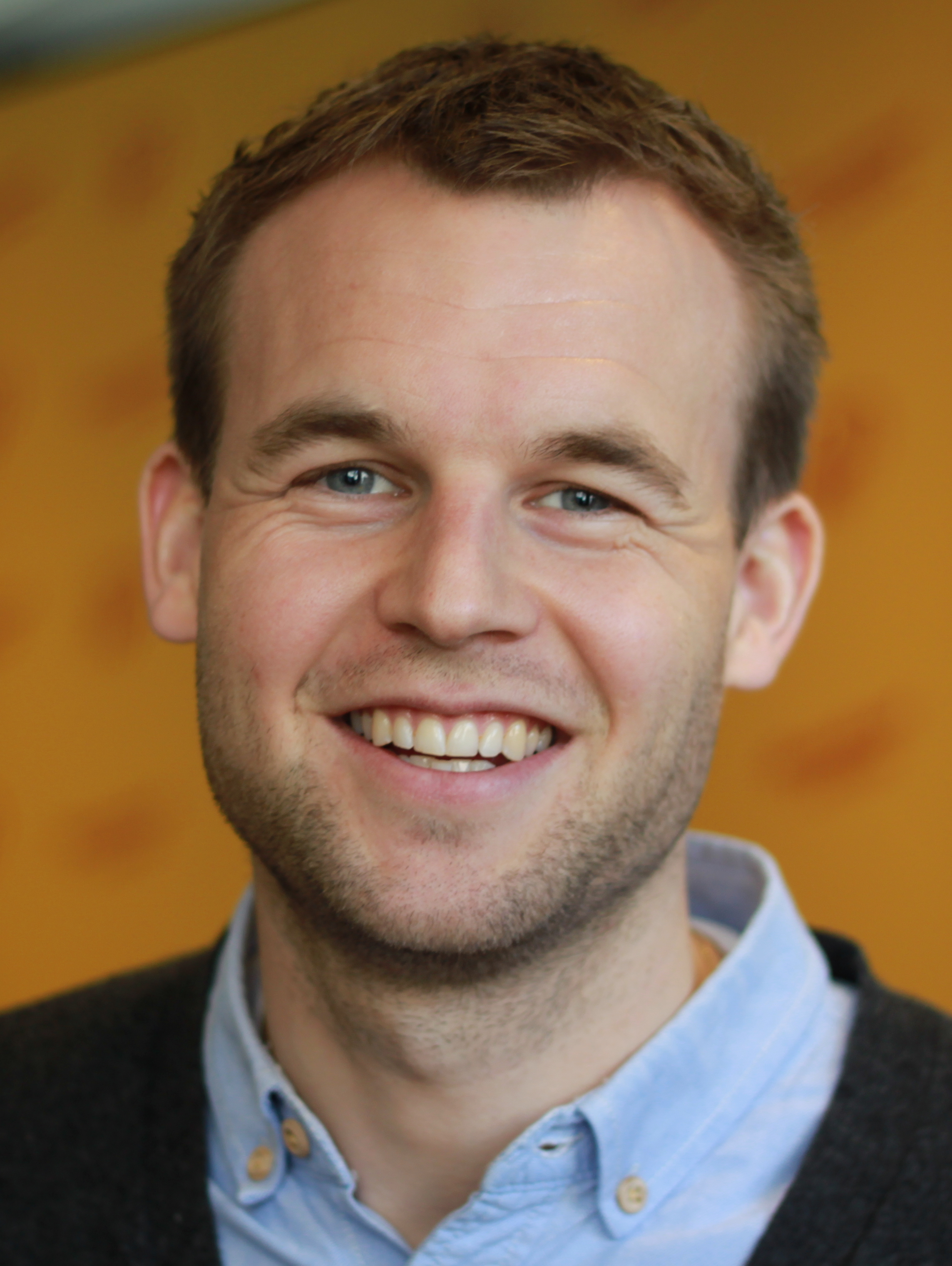

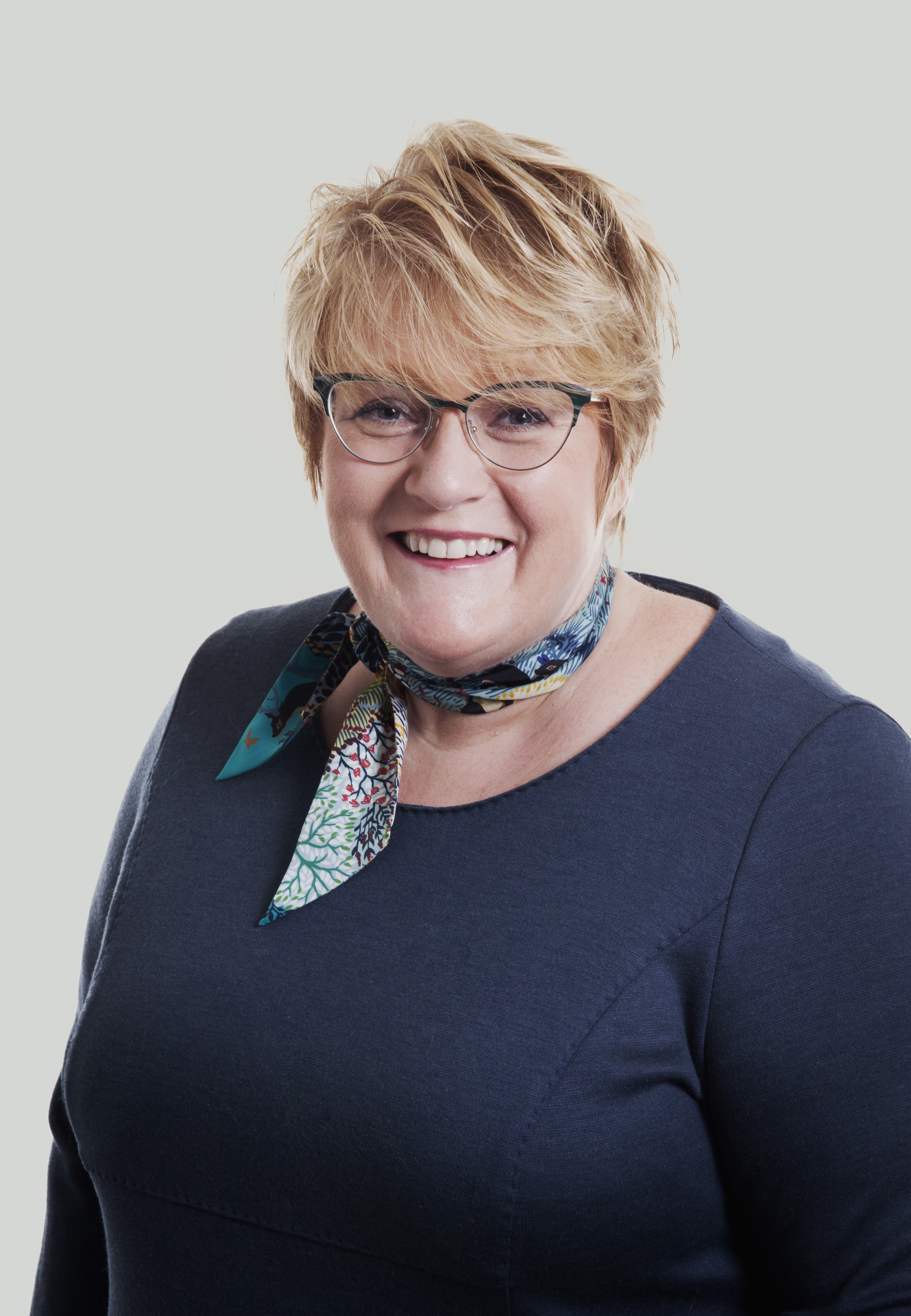

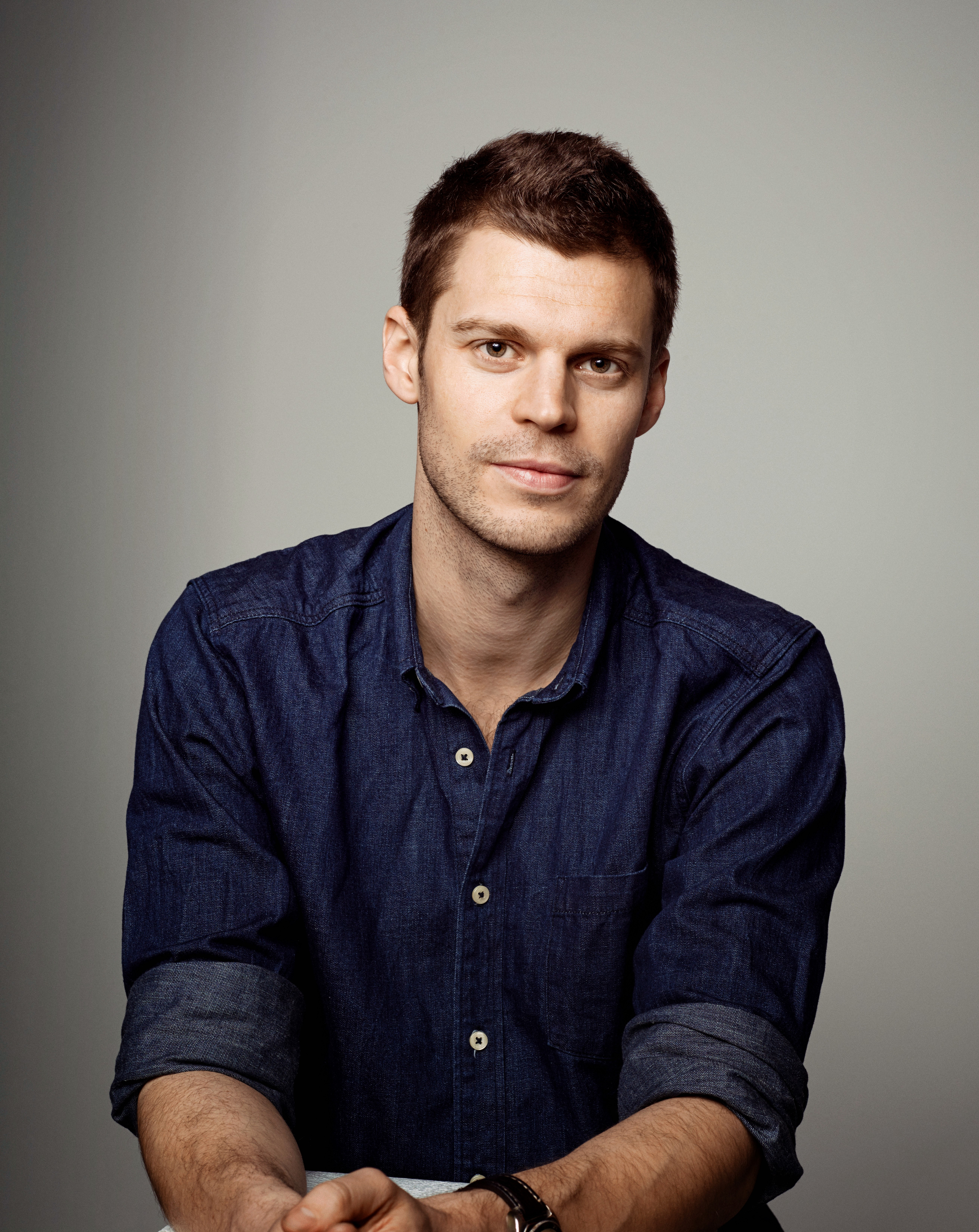
	Majority party	Minority party	Third party
Leader	Jonas Gahr Støre	Erna Solberg	Trygve Slagsvold Vedum
Party	Labour	Conservative	Centre
Last election	33.0%	23.1%	8.5%
Popular vote	664,695	538,765	386,349
Percentage	24.8%	20.1%	14.4%
Swing	▼8.2 pp	▼3.1 pp	▲5.9 pp
	Fourth party	Fifth party	Sixth party
Leader	Siv Jensen	Une Aina Bastholm; Arild Hermstad	Audun Lysbakken
Party	Progress	Green	Socialist Left
Last election	9.5%	4.3%	4.1%
Popular vote	220,713	182,548	163,653
Percentage	8.2%	6.8%	6.1%
Swing	▼1.2 pp	▲2.6 pp	▲2.0 pp
	Seventh party	Eighth party	Ninth party
Leader	Kjell Ingolf Ropstad	Trine Skei Grande	Bjørnar Moxnes
Party	Christian Democratic	Liberal	Red
Last election	5.5%	5.5%	2.0%
Popular vote	107,185	104,316	101,316
Percentage	4.0%	3.9%	3.8%
Swing	▼1.4 pp	▼1.6 pp	▲1.8 pp

Local elections were held in Norway on 9 September 2019. Voters elected representatives to municipal and county councils, which are responsible for education, public transport, health, and elderly care, and for the levy of certain taxes.

The local election was the first since the consolidation of municipalities and counties, reducing the number of counties from 19 to 11, and number of municipalities from 429 to 356. Despite the formal date of the mergers being 1 January 2020, the election proceeded with the new borders and divisions as the term of office began the same day.

The political parties in five municipalities in Finnmark county (Alta, Karasjok, Kautokeino, Kvænangen and Loppa) cancelled all their campaigning following a helicopter crash in Alta on 31 August.

== Debates ==
2019 Norwegian local elections debates
Date	Time	Organisers	P Present I Invitee N Non-invitee								
Date	Time	Organisers	Ap	H	Frp	Sp	KrF	V	SV	MDG	Refs
5 August	???	TV2	P Jonas Gahr Støre	P Erna Solberg	N Siv Jensen	N Trygve Slagsvold Vedum	N Knut Arild Hareide	N Trine Skei Grande	N Audun Lysbakken	N Rasmus Hansson	

== Results ==
=== Municipality results ===
The table below shows the results for the 20 most populous municipalities.

Municipality	Ap		H		Sp		Frp		MDG		SV		KrF		V		R		Others		Total	
Municipality	%	Seats	%	Seats	%	Seats	%	Seats	%	Seats	%	Seats	%	Seats	%	Seats	%	Seats	%	M	%	M
Oslo	20,0	12	25,4	15	2,2	1	5,3	3	15,3	9	9,1	6	1,7	1	5,8	4	7,2	4	8,1	4	100	59
Bergen	19,8	13	20,0	14	5,3	4	4,7	3	9,9	7	8,6	6	3,1	2	3,8	3	4,9	3	19,9	12	100	67
Trondheim	25,0	17	20,6	14	7,1	5	5,1	4	10,4	7	11,3	8	2,0	1	4,9	3	6,9	5	6,5	3	100	67
Stavanger	25,4	18	23,1	16	4,8	3	8,9	6	6,5	4	4,8	3	4,4	3	4,7	3	5,5	4	12,0	7	100	67
Bærum	14,8	8	42,4	22	3,4	2	7,1	4	10,8	5	4,2	2	1,8	1	9,8	5	2,7	1	3,0	1	100	51
Kristiansand	18,3	13	17,7	13	4,6	3	5,5	4	7,5	6	6,1	4	11,5	8	3,3	2	2,9	2	22,4	16	100	71
Drammen	26,2	15	25,7	15	8,0	5	10,7	6	8,6	5	4,5	3	2,2	1	2,1	1	2,5	1	9,6	5	100	57
Asker	16,1	9	43,1	24	6,0	3	7,3	4	10,5	6	4,6	3	1,9	1	5,8	3	2,5	1	2,2	1	100	55
Lillestrøm	29,9	16	19,6	11	11,9	7	10,7	6	6,4	4	5,0	3	2,4	1	2,9	2	2,6	1	8,7	4	100	55
Fredrikstad	36,3	19	15,3	8	6,6	3	12,5	7	6,9	4	4,4	2	3,5	2	1,5	1	5,0	3	7,9	4	100	53
Sandnes	25,1	13	16,3	8	6,9	3	18,0	9	5,2	3	4,5	2	7,4	4	2,5	1	2,3	1	11,9	5	100	49
Tromsø	18,9	8	15,5	7	11,0	5	8,6	4	7,4	3	16,0	7	2,1	1	3,1	1	5,2	2	12,3	5	100	43
Ålesund	20,4	16	19,5	15	12,8	10	17,4	13	4,7	4	3,2	2	5,9	5	2,1	2	1,8	1	12,3	9	100	77
Sandefjord	25,4	15	32,5	17	10,0	6	8,1	5	5,2	3	4,8	2	3,1	3	5,7	3	2,5	2	2,8	0	100	57
Nordre Follo	23,4	11	29,9	14	7,1	3	8,3	4	10,2	5	5,4	3	2,5	1	6,1	3	3,0	1	4,0	2	100	47
Sarpsborg	34,5	15	9,8	4	10,8	5	10,4	4	4,0	2	2,4	1	4,0	2	1,2	0	4,2	2	18,8	8	100	43
Tønsberg	26,8	13	26,1	13	12,6	6	9,2	5	7,4	4	5,9	3	3,9	2	4,0	2	2,8	1	1,2	0	100	49
Skien	31,9	18	17,9	10	10,3	6	9,8	5	5,4	3	5,8	3	5,6	3	2,1	1	4,7	3	6,6	3	100	55
Bodø	27,3	11	25,7	10	9,9	4	11,3	4	6,0	2	5,0	2	2,0	1	4,3	2	8,0	3	0,5	0	100	39
Moss	27,6	14	19,0	9	7,2	4	8,7	4	5,9	3	6,0	3	2,4	1	4,6	2	7,0	4	11,5	5	100	49

== Results ==
=== Municipal elections ===
==== Nationwide results ====
Party	Votes	%	Seats	+/–
Labour Party	664,695	24.79	2,583	-877
Conservative Party	538,765	20.09	1,488	-466
Centre Party	386,349	14.41	2,265	+491
Progress Party	220,713	8.23	701	-188
Green Party	182,548	6.81	310	+78
Socialist Left Party	163,653	6.10	459	+100
Christian Democratic Party	107,185	4.00	411	-212
Liberal Party	104,316	3.89	264	-282
Red Party	101,316	3.78	193	+112
Local parties	77,083	2.87	–	–
People's Party FNB	65,300	2.44	51	+51
Pensioners' Party	30,692	1.14	60	+16
Norway Democrats	10,442	0.39	10	+10
The Christians	9,597	0.36	6	+3
Joint lists	6,726	0.25	93	0
Capitalist Party	4,032	0.15	0	0
Health Party	3,180	0.12	3	+3
Nordmørslista	2,125	0.08	10	+10
Saami lists	903	0.03	13	0
Communist Party of Norway	823	0.03	0	0
Alliance	639	0.02	0	0
Coastal Party	468	0.02	1	–10
Total	2,681,550	100.00	8,921	0
Valid votes	2,681,550	98.96		
Invalid/blank votes	28,316	1.04		
Total votes	2,709,866	100.00		
Registered voters/turnout	4,199,382	64.53		

=== Oslo ===
Mayor of Oslo:

- Marianne Borgen (Socialist Left) (elected)
- Saida Begum (Conservative Party)

== Opinion polls ==
=== National ===
==== Municipal elections ====
Polling firm	Fieldwork date	Sample size	Resp.	R	SV	MDG	Ap	Sp	V	KrF	H	FrP	FNB	Others	Lead
2019 elections	9 Sep 2019	–	–	3.8	6.1	6.8	24.8	14.4	3.9	4.0	20.1	8.2	2.4	5.5	4.7
Kantar TNS	2–7 Sep 2019	2,993	75.8	3.2	7.0	6.9	24.9	15.8	3.6	4.5	18.4	7.8	3.2	4.7	6.5
Respons Analyse	3–6 Sep 2019	1,300	–	3.5	8.4	8.7	22.7	14.7	3.4	4.1	21.0	8.1	2.1	3.3	1.7
Kantar TNS	2–6 Sep 2019	2,694	75.5	3.2	7.0	7.1	25.2	15.4	3.6	4.4	18.3	7.8	3.4	4.8	6.9
Opinion Perduco	2–5 Sep 2019	948	77.0	4.5	7.1	7.0	24.9	14.7	4.1	4.0	17.6	7.7	–	8.3	7.3
Norfakta	3–4 Sep 2019	1,003	–	4.7	6.4	8.5	24.3	15.1	4.3	4.3	19.5	7.6	–	5.3	4.8
Kantar TNS	30 Aug–3 Sep 2019	1,347	–	3.7	6.8	6.5	25.2	15.5	3.1	3.6	21.1	6.3	4.3	3.8	4.4
Kantar TNS	28 Aug–2 Sep 2019	1,554	75.3	4.1	6.3	7.3	24.1	15.1	2.6	3.4	21.3	7.3	4.3	4.2	2.8
Norstat	27 Aug–2 Sep 2019	962	82.0	4.3	6.4	10.0	22.3	15.2	5.4	4.6	18.4	7.3	1.3	4.8	3.9
Kantar TNS	27–30 Aug 2019	1,399	76.5	4.3	6.1	7.3	24.0	14.8	2.4	3.8	21.4	7.5	3.5	4.8	2.6
Respons Analyse	23–28 Aug 2019	1,002	–	3.7	6.4	7.6	22.4	15.6	3.7	4.1	20.8	9.4	1.7	4.6	1.6
Kantar TNS	26–28 Aug 2019	1,052	74.7	5.0	7.0	8.2	20.6	15.0	3.5	3.4	20.5	8.4	3.3	5.3	0.1
Kantar TNS	19–23 Aug 2019	1,448	77.7	4.1	7.8	8.1	23.2	15.6	4.0	4.5	17.4	8.5	3.4	3.4	5.8
Respons Analyse	22 Aug 2019	1,000	–	4.7	6.7	7.7	23.1	13.1	3.5	5.1	19.9	9.8	2.8	3.6	3.2
Ipsos MMI	19–21 Aug 2019	719	–	4.0	6.6	5.9	21.5	18.1	2.9	3.3	20.2	10.0	–	7.5	1.3
Kantar TNS	16–21 Aug 2019	1,246	–	3.5	7.0	8.2	24.5	14.3	4.3	3.8	18.6	8.8	2.9	4.2	5.9
Sentio	13–18 Aug 2019	1,000	–	4.3	7.4	7.9	29.0	11.8	3.5	4.2	20.9	6.1	–	5.2	8.1
Kantar TNS	12–16 Aug 2019	973	74.5	5.3	6.5	4.1	23.4	17.1	4.4	3.4	20.8	6.1	3.5	5.5	2.6
Respons Analyse	9–14 Aug 2019	1,000	–	3.8	6.1	7.8	23.7	15.4	3.7	4.7	20.4	8.4	2.4	3.6	3.3
Norstat	6–12 Aug 2019	958	77.7	3.8	6.1	7.0	27.3	12.2	2.3	4.3	23.0	6.8	3.7	3.5	4.3
Kantar TNS	5–9 Aug 2019	973	76.5	5.1	7.3	7.0	23.0	16.0	2.9	3.4	20.6	6.3	3.4	5.1	2.4
Norfakta	6–7 Aug 2019	1,000	80.0	3.7	7.7	6.4	24.8	14.7	4.2	3.7	21.2	6.7	3.4	3.4	3.6
Respons Analyse	5–7 Aug 2019	1,001	–	3.3	6.6	6.7	24.9	14.4	4.2	4.9	20.8	9.2	2.5	2.5	4.1
Kantar TNS	2–28 Jun 2019	966	83.5	5.1	5.8	6.2	25.6	13.7	3.8	3.7	19.5	7.6	3.5	5.6	6.1
Ipsos MMI	24–26 Jun 2019	723	–	5.1	7.0	4.0	25.3	13.0	2.9	2.2	19.9	9.6	6.1	4.9	5.4
Kantar TNS	3–7 Jun 2019	987	79.3	5.6	6.7	5.4	24.2	11.6	2.7	3.6	23.3	8.1	4.6	4.0	0.9
Respons Analyse	3–6 Jun 2019	1,002	–	4.1	6.0	5.7	25.0	13.0	3.2	4.3	22.4	8.6	6.0	1.7	2.6
Norstat	28 May–3 Jun 2019	951	–	4.4	4.7	9.2	26.5	11.5	3.0	4.3	21.2	7.2	4.8	3.2	5.3
Norstat	30 Apr–6 May 2019	1,000	–	4.3	5.2	6.4	28.9	10.6	4.5	3.3	24.3	7.7	1.8	3.1	4.6
Kantar TNS	29 Apr–3 May 2019	987	77.5	5.3	6.8	4.7	26.4	12.9	3.3	4.1	21.0	8.9	3.5	3.4	5.4
Respons Analyse	29 Apr–2 May 2019	1,000	–	4.2	6.3	4.6	27.4	12.5	2.4	4.4	23.5	10.6	–	4.1	3.9
Respons Analyse	2–4 Apr 2019	1,001	–	3.9	6.4	4.0	25.2	15.2	3.9	4.2	23.2	9.1	–	4.9	2.0
Norstat	26 Mar–1 Apr 2019	628	–	2.8	7.7	5.5	28.0	12.0	3.4	4.9	22.1	8.4	–	5.1	5.9
Kantar TNS	23–29 Mar 2019	982	–	4.4	5.8	5.8	26.4	14.3	2.9	4.3	22.5	10.1	1.4	2.2	3.9
Norstat	26 Feb–4 Mar 2019	980	–	3.3	5.7	6.1	29.6	10.8	2.7	5.3	25.8	7.3	–	3.4	3.8
Kantar TNS	25 Feb–1 Mar 2019	982	73.2	4.2	5.1	3.4	26.5	12.4	3.0	4.9	25.1	10.6	–	4.7	1.4
Norstat	29 Jan–4 Feb 2019	937	–	3.3	5.2	4.6	31.3	11.1	2.8	4.8	24.4	9.0	–	3.4	6.9
Kantar TNS	24 Jan 2019	–	–	3.3	5.5	3.6	28.3	11.6	4.5	3.6	28.0	8.8	–	3.1	0.3
Norstat	2–7 Jan 2019	925	–	3.7	5.3	4.9	31.1	10.3	3.1	4.4	26.9	8.1	–	2.3	4.2
Respons Analyse	6–10 Sep 2018	1,002	–	4.3	4.9	4.2	26.2	10.0	3.7	4.9	28.4	12.1	–	2.3	2.2
Kantar TNS	6 Sep 2018	979	–	4.9	5.7	2.4	25.4	10.3	3.1	5.3	26.5	10.3	–	5.5	1.1
Kantar TNS	1–7 Aug 2018	982	–	4.8	8.1	3.0	23.5	13.6	3.3	4.7	27.4	8.6	–	3.0	3.9
Kantar TNS	26 Feb–3 Mar 2018	980	–	2.2	5.6	3.5	24.1	12.9	4.0	3.8	29.9	10.3	–	3.7	5.8
2015 elections	14 Sep 2015	–	59.6	2.0	4.1	4.2	33.0	8.5	5.5	5.4	23.2	9.5	–	4.6	9.8

=== By municipality ===
In case of the merger of municipalities, the 2015 results listed are those for the municipality of that name in 2015.

==== Oslo ====
Polling firm	Fieldwork date	Sample size	Resp.	R	SV	MDG	Ap	Sp	V	KrF	H	FrP	FNB	Others	Lead
2019 elections	9 Sep 2019	367,389	67.6	7.2	9.1	15.3	20.0	2.2	5.8	1.7	25.4	5.3	5.8	2.3	5.4
Kantar TNS	2–6 Sep 2019	795	75.4	8.5	9.2	14.0	22.2	2.7	5.9	2.0	24.1	4.9	4.9	1.5	1.9
Norstat	28 Aug–3 Sep 2019	1,000	–	7.6	9.0	15.8	21.2	1.9	5.8	1.0	26.4	4.3	4.9	2.1	5.2
Kantar TNS	28 Aug–3 Sep 2019	1,315	77.7	10.7	9.6	14.4	21.4	2.4	4.5	1.4	23.8	4.3	5.9	1.6	2.4
Kantar TNS	22–27 Aug 2019	803	–	9.1	9.0	16.0	19.6	2.6	3.5	1.6	23.3	6.1	7.8	1.3	3.7
Respons Analyse	22–27 Aug 2019	803	–	7.9	8.1	18.6	19.6	2.1	5.0	1.4	24.9	6.7	3.8	0.9	5.3
Norstat	15–20 Aug 2019	1,000	–	7.0	7.4	13.2	24.5	1.0	5.5	1.8	27.0	4.7	6.3	1.6	2.5
Opinion Perduco	12–14 Aug 2019	599	–	8.9	6.6	15.2	24.3	3.1	4.9	2.0	25.0	2.9	7.1	2.2	0.7
Sentio	11–13 Jun 2019	800	–	7.8	9.7	13.7	19.8	1.5	4.7	1.1	27.1	5.2	9.6	0.0	7.3
Norstat	6–12 Jun 2019	989	–	7.1	5.8	16.7	19.9	1.4	4.3	2.0	27.5	5.2	7.9	2.1	7.6
Respons Analyse	4–6 Jun 2019	601	–	9.1	8.5	13.9	19.6	1.7	5.2	1.0	23.0	7.7	9.1	1.2	3.4
Opinion Perduco	9 Apr 2019	–	–	8.5	8.1	9.5	26.8	2.1	7.4	3.1	31.4	3.0	–	0.1	4.6
Norstat	4–9 Apr 2019	1,000	–	7.4	9.2	9.6	27.8	2.6	4.5	1.9	30.9	5.7	–	0.3	3.1
Respons Analyse	7–12 Mar 2019	600	–	9.2	9.6	9.8	24.2	1.9	5.8	1.8	31.4	4.8	–	1.5	7.2
Norstat	7–12 Feb 2019	1,000	–	7.4	8.0	10.7	26.5	0.9	4.6	2.2	33.6	5.9	–	0.2	7.1
Respons Analyse	29 Aug–3 Sep 2018	600	–	6.9	9.9	7.8	25.5	0.9	7.9	1.7	28.5	9.4	–	1.5	3.0
Respons Analyse	6–20 Jun 2018	1,004	88.0	11.8	8.9	9.3	19.4	0.7	5.2	1.5	35.8	6.7	–	0.7	16.4
Respons Analyse	24–28 May 2018	600	81.0	8.7	8.4	7.1	22.3	1.2	7.8	1.9	33.1	8.5	–	1.0	10.8
Sentio	24 Apr–5 May 2018	1,000	78.6	9.3	7.1	6.3	25.0	1.4	7.5	3.0	32.2	7.0	–	1.1	7.2
Respons Analyse	7–13 Dec 2017	801	82.0	7.0	9.5	7.2	23.8	1.3	6.3	1.7	35.4	6.8	–	1.0	11.6
Respons Analyse	15–20 Jun 2017	–	–	6.1	6.0	8.2	26.7	1.5	4.9	2.1	34.8	9.1	–	0.6	8.1
Respons Analyse	9–14 Mar 2017	800	–	6.5	5.7	7.6	26.6	1.9	5.0	2.7	34.4	8.6	–	1.0	7.8
Respons Analyse	8–13 Dec 2016	800	–	5.7	6.9	7.9	26.8	0.9	6.9	2.2	36.6	6.1	–	0.0	9.8
Respons Analyse	15–20 Sep 2016	801	84.0	4.9	5.9	7.5	30.0	0.9	6.1	2.3	33.8	7.9	–	0.7	3.8
Respons Analyse	9–14 Jun 2016	600	82.0	4.4	5.7	7.8	27.3	0.7	7.1	3.7	34.8	7.5	–	1.0	7.5
Respons Analyse	28 Oct–3 Nov 2015	805	–	5.6	6.0	7.0	32.2	0.5	6.4	2.4	32.7	6.3	–	1.1	0.5
2015 elections	14 Sep 2015	–	62.7	5.0	5.4	8.1	32.0	0.6	6.9	2.4	31.8	6.0	–	1.7	0.2

==== Bergen ====
Polling firm	Fieldwork date	Sample size	Resp.	R	SV	MDG	Ap	Sp	V	KrF	H	FrP	FNB	Others	Lead
2019 elections	9 Sep 2019	151,680	68.1	4.9	8.6	9.9	19.8	5.3	3.8	3.1	20.0	4.7	16.7	3.2	0.2
Sentio	30 Aug–3 Sep 2019	600	77.0	4.8	9.0	10.0	17.5	4.0	2.5	3.3	20.7	5.5	–	20.1	3.2
Respons Analyse	26–28 Aug 2019	600	78.0	5.2	10.7	9.9	18.0	4.1	3.8	2.9	23.7	3.5	–	18.2	5.7
Kantar TNS	19–26 Aug 2019	896	76.7	6.2	9.4	8.0	21.2	4.6	3.0	3.9	20.4	5.9	15.0	2.4	0.8
Sentio	12–15 Aug 2019	600	–	4.4	12.9	7.5	18.3	3.8	4.7	3.5	19.2	4.8	–	20.9	0.9
Respons Analyse	12–14 Aug 2019	601	71.0	5.2	10.0	5.7	20.0	3.0	3.3	2.4	22.6	4.5	–	23.3	2.6
Respons Analyse	5–7 Aug 2019	600	70.0	5.3	8.2	6.9	22.4	2.7	3.2	3.1	23.1	2.9	–	22.2	0.7
Sentio	23–27 Jul 2019	600	75.5	5.8	7.7	7.5	21.4	2.8	5.9	2.2	21.3	4.2	20.0	1.1	0.1
Respons Analyse	19–22 Jun 2019	600	–	4.6	11.0	6.8	20.8	3.0	3.1	3.5	16.0	4.7	25.2	1.3	4.4
Respons Analyse	19–22 Jun 2019	600	–	4.6	11.0	6.8	20.8	3.0	3.1	3.5	16.0	4.7	25.2	1.3	4.4
Sentio	11–13 Jun 2019	600	73.5	4.5	10.2	6.9	16.9	4.0	3.2	3.6	21.2	6.1	22.1	0.9	0.9
Respons Analyse	13–19 May 2019	600	72.0	5.5	10.0	3.9	18.6	3.5	2.8	3.2	23.1	2.7	25.4	1.3	2.3
Sentio	29 Apr–2 May 2019	600	69.0	5.3	9.3	3.8	18.6	5.8	3.2	2.6	25.1	3.9	20.6	0.8	4.5
Respons Analyse	8–10 Apr 2019	600	–	5.6	10.0	4.5	22.8	4.7	3.1	2.7	24.1	4.8	16.9	0.9	1.3
Respons Analyse	11–13 Mar 2019	601	–	5.0	10.5	3.4	23.5	6.4	3.9	2.3	29.3	7.9	6.9	0.9	5.8
Sentio	11–12 Mar 2019	600	68.0	5.6	11.1	3.5	20.6	7.5	1.9	2.8	29.9	9.9	–	7.1	9.3
Sentio	9–11 Jan 2019	600	67.3	3.7	10.2	4.9	23.6	4.4	4.3	2.3	31.7	11.2	–	3.8	8.1
Respons Analyse	11–14 Dec 2018	600	70.0	5.4	9.5	3.5	26.3	2.3	4.0	2.9	30.2	11.1	–	4.7	3.9
Respons Analyse	20–23 Nov 2018	803	71.0	5.4	10.7	4.1	26.3	4.3	5.3	2.9	28.8	9.5	–	2.5	2.5
Sentio	23–25 Oct 2018	600	63.7	5.4	11.6	4.5	24.4	3.6	4.0	4.1	30.5	10.4	–	1.5	6.1
Sentio	3–6 Sep 2018	600	61.2	4.6	9.7	3.1	24.9	4.4	4.9	3.3	34.2	9.5	–	1.3	9.3
Respons Analyse	27–30 Aug 2018	600	–	4.7	10.6	3.4	26.1	2.3	3.9	3.4	34.7	9.4	–	1.5	8.6
Sentio	19–25 Jun 2018	600	66.7	4.5	12.2	2.7	20.5	3.2	6.2	3.0	34.7	11.7	–	1.3	14.2
Respons Analyse	12–18 Jun 2018	601	73.0	4.7	11.8	2.3	23.2	2.9	4.5	4.3	34.8	10.2	–	1.3	11.6
Sentio	27 Apr–10 May 2018	1,000	72.7	5.6	8.8	4.8	28.1	2.5	3.9	5.4	29.3	8.7	–	2.9	1.2
Respons Analyse	12–16 Mar 2018	601	74.0	3.6	9.8	3.6	22.2	4.1	4.1	3.8	34.6	13.0	–	1.2	12.4
Respons Analyse	11–15 Dec 2017	800	77.0	2.9	8.6	5.0	23.2	4.1	4.2	3.5	37.1	10.9	–	0.5	13.9
Respons Analyse	13–16 Mar 2017	602	–	1.9	9.1	5.7	36.2	4.2	6.1	5.8	23.2	7.8	–	0.0	13.0
Respons Analyse	12–15 Dec 2016	600	68.0	4.4	8.1	3.1	34.9	3.0	4.7	4.3	24.7	10.8	–	2.0	10.2
InFact	5 Sep 2016	1,015	–	4.4	8.9	6.1	30.4	3.6	2.9	6.5	26.8	9.2	–	1.2	3.6
Respons Analyse	13–16 Jun 2016	602	–	2.3	6.3	3.9	36.5	3.4	5.7	5.6	25.8	9.0	–	1.5	10.7
InFact	2 May 2016	1,004	–	3.5	8.4	4.9	26.5	2.4	4.7	5.5	28.3	13.9	–	2.0	1.8
Respons Analyse	14–17 Mar 2016	601	–	2.3	8.4	6.3	33.8	2.6	6.6	3.7	25.7	8.6	–	2.0	8.1
InFact	26 Nov 2015	1,003	–	2.8	7.7	5.2	33.0	1.6	4.9	6.5	20.8	15.6	–	1.9	12.2
2015 elections	14 Sep 2015	–	61.1	2.3	7.0	6.0	37.8	2.0	5.5	6.0	22.1	8.7	–	2.5	15.7

==== Trondheim ====
Polling firm	Fieldwork date	Sample size	Resp.	R	SV	MDG	Ap	Sp	V	KrF	H	FrP	Others	Lead
2019 elections	9 Sep 2019	105,044	66.1	6.9	11.3	10.4	25.0	7.1	4.9	2.0	20.6	5.1	6.5	4.4
Respons Analyse	12–15 Aug 2019	601	–	6.1	11.3	9.2	27.7	6.7	4.9	1.3	22.4	6.1	4.3	5.3
Respons Analyse	27–31 May 2019	600	–	8.5	9.5	7.4	31.2	6.4	4.6	2.4	18.3	8.2	3.5	12.9
Respons Analyse	13–15 Mar 2019	600	–	7.7	10.5	4.5	28.2	6.5	3.5	1.9	26.0	7.2	4.0	2.2
Respons Analyse	25–28 Feb 2019	600	74.0	7.2	13.1	7.4	26.9	5.9	3.4	1.6	24.8	9.0	1.2	2.1
Respons Analyse	14–16 Nov 2018	600	75.0	5.5	10.1	5.7	31.9	5.5	3.9	2.4	24.8	8.8	1.4	7.1
Respons Analyse	9–14 Aug 2018	601	–	6.6	15.2	3.6	26.2	6.1	5.2	2.6	23.2	9.5	1.2	3.0
Respons Analyse	6–12 Jun 2018	600	75.0	6.6	9.9	4.4	27.8	5.9	4.9	2.4	27.4	8.5	2.2	0.4
Respons Analyse	26–28 Feb 2018	600	72.0	3.8	10.0	6.6	27.2	6.6	4.8	2.7	28.0	6.5	3.8	0.8
Sentio	12–17 Feb 2018	363	76.9	2.8	11.5	7.1	28.1	3.1	7.2	2.0	29.7	7.7	0.8	1.6
Respons Analyse	3–8 May 2017	600	–	4.6	7.2	4.9	39.5	5.4	4.7	2.6	22.1	7.7	1.3	17.4
2015 elections	14 Sep 2015	–	60.3	2.5	6.2	7.7	41.5	2.7	5.5	3.2	20.0	6.4	4.3	21.4

==== Stavanger ====
Polling firm	Fieldwork date	Sample size	Resp.	R	SV	MDG	Ap	Sp	V	KrF	H	FrP	FNB	Others	Lead
2019 elections	9 Sep 2019	72,063	66.1	5.5	4.8	6.5	25.4	4.8	4.7	4.4	23.1	8.9	9.2	2.8	2.3
Respons Analyse	11–14 Jun 2019	602	–	4.7	5.2	5.8	23.4	4.6	6.1	4.8	23.2	12.3	8.8	1.1	0.2
Respons Analyse	11–14 Jun 2019	602	–	4.6	5.8	5.6	22.4	4.2	4.3	4.3	29.1	6.3	12.0	1.4	6.7
Respons Analyse	4–6 Mar 2019	600	–	4.3	7.3	3.8	26.1	4.4	2.3	4.9	34.0	8.6	2.8	1.5	7.9
Respons Analyse	18–21 Feb 2019	801	–	4.3	5.9	4.3	28.7	4.5	3.4	4.5	29.5	10.3	–	5.0	0.8
Respons Analyse	28 Aug–3 Sep 2018	601	–	3.4	5.8	4.1	25.9	3.9	3.4	3.9	30.8	16.1	–	2.7	4.9
Respons Analyse	4–7 Apr 2018	804	80.0	2.7	5.7	3.1	24.5	4.2	5.6	6.0	33.6	12.8	–	1.6	9.1
2015 elections	14 Sep 2015	–	57.9	1.3	4.5	5.2	27.4	1.8	8.3	5.9	28.9	10.9	–	5.8	1.5

==== Bærum ====
Polling firm	Fieldwork date	Sample size	Resp.	R	SV	MDG	Ap	Sp	V	KrF	H	FrP	Others	Lead
2019 elections	9 Sep 2019	68,541	70.9	2.7	4.2	10.8	14.8	3.4	9.8	1.8	42.4	7.1	3.0	27.6
Sentio	23–28 Aug 2019	500	–	2.3	3.2	12.6	14.1	2.9	9.0	2.0	45.5	5.4	3.0	31.4
Sentio	13–15 May 2018	500	70.0	2.9	2.0	8.1	18.8	1.9	7.1	1.2	47.7	7.2	2.1	28.9
2015 elections	14 Sep 2015	–	63.3	1.4	3.1	6.3	20.0	1.2	9.7	2.6	45.3	7.6	2.8	25.3

==== Kristiansand ====
Polling firm	Fieldwork date	Sample size	Resp.	R	SV	MDG	Ap	Sp	V	KrF	H	FrP	Others	Lead
2019 elections	9 Sep 2019	56,381	65.6	2.9	6.1	7.5	18.3	4.6	3.3	11.5	17.7	5.5	22.5	0.6
Respons Analyse	26 Aug–3 Sep 2019	600	76.0	3.8	7.3	8.7	19.4	5.1	3.7	9.9	19.4	6.2	16.5	Tie
Respons Analyse	16–20 Aug 2019	601	–	2.6	6.5	6.8	19.9	4.9	3.9	11.3	23.1	8.4	12.6	3.2
Respons Analyse	12–18 Jun 2019	602	–	3.4	6.7	6.2	21.5	3.6	4.2	11.7	25.4	5.8	10.7	3.9
Respons Analyse	4–6 Mar 2019	602	–	3.6	6.6	5.2	24.2	3.0	3.4	12.8	25.4	9.6	6.2	1.2
Respons Analyse	27–31 Aug 2018	800	73.0	2.1	5.1	3.0	23.5	3.8	3.3	10.9	29.7	11.8	6.8	6.2
Respons Analyse	25–27 Jan 2018	–	–	1.5	6.3	2.5	21.8	4.5	4.0	12.8	33.2	10.4	2.5	11.4
2015 elections	14 Sep 2015	–	58.0	2.1	3.3	4.9	28.1	1.4	4.7	15.8	23.7	7.9	8.1	4.4

==== Fredrikstad ====
Polling firm	Fieldwork date	Sample size	Resp.	R	SV	MDG	Ap	Sp	V	KrF	H	FrP	Others	Lead
2019 elections	9 Sep 2019	37,974	58.0	5.0	4.4	6.9	36.3	6.6	1.5	3.5	15.3	12.5	7.9	21.0
Sentio	30 Aug–3 Sep 2019	500	–	7.9	5.5	12.3	34.2	3.3	1.6	3.1	15.3	9.5	8.2	18.9
Sentio	9–14 Aug 2019	500	–	2.9	4.0	5.3	46.4	5.6	1.7	4.0	15.7	10.3	3.4	30.7
Sentio	21–24 Jan 2019	600	60.7	2.7	2.9	2.9	43.1	3.3	3.5	4.0	21.0	14.1	2.5	22.1
Sentio	25–29 Sep 2018	500	55.8	3.1	2.5	2.2	48.8	2.7	2.5	3.6	15.7	15.7	3.0	33.1
2015 elections	14 Sep 2015	–	53.0	1.1	2.6	4.0	48.3	2.8	3.1	4.4	16.4	13.1	4.2	31.9

==== Sandnes ====
Polling firm	Fieldwork date	Sample size	Resp.	R	SV	MDG	Ap	Sp	V	KrF	H	FrP	Others	Lead
2019 elections	9 Sep 2019	37,150	63.1	2.3	4.5	5.2	25.1	6.9	2.5	7.4	16.3	18.0	11.9	7.1
Respons Analyse	22–28 Aug 2019	601	–	2.6	6.5	5.5	22.0	9.5	1.9	8.2	16.7	15.7	11.4	5.3
Respons Analyse	11–14 Jun 2019	600	–	2.9	4.6	4.1	22.8	8.5	2.4	6.8	19.5	13.5	14.9	3.3
Respons Analyse	4–6 Mar 2019	600	65.0	2.3	5.6	3.1	27.4	5.9	2.6	8.6	22.6	17.0	5.1	4.8
Respons Analyse	18–21 Feb 2019	801	–	1.9	5.0	1.6	28.9	7.5	1.7	8.1	24.8	15.8	4.7	4.1
Respons Analyse	6–12 Feb 2019	600	75.0	1.8	3.9	3.1	29.4	7.2	2.0	8.7	23.3	16.8	3.8	6.1
Respons Analyse	28 Aug–3 Sep 2018	600	–	1.2	6.4	2.4	27.3	6.9	2.8	6.3	16.5	24.0	6.2	3.3
2015 elections	14 Sep 2015	–	55.7	0.7	2.5	2.9	36.4	4.5	3.0	9.1	15.1	24.1	1.9	12.3

==== Tromsø ====
Polling firm	Fieldwork date	Sample size	Resp.	R	SV	MDG	Ap	Sp	V	KrF	H	FrP	Others	Lead
2019 elections	9 Sep 2019	38,070	63.6	5.2	16.0	7.4	18.9	11.0	3.1	2.1	15.5	8.6	12.2	2.9
InFact	4 Sep 2019	–	–	7.4	14.9	6.8	17.6	10.6	3.2	2.9	14.7	9.7	11.1	2.7
Respons Analyse	29 Aug–2 Sep 2019	601	74,0	6.8	16.1	9.5	16.9	10.0	1.8	2.2	15.4	9.9	11.4	0.8
InFact	7 Aug 2019	1,029	–	8.5	13.5	6.2	15.4	13.3	3.2	1.3	15.6	6.9	14.4	0.2
InFact	8 Jul 2019	1,011	–	8.5	12.7	6.0	16.8	10.9	2.3	1.5	17.0	9.0	15.2	0.2
Respons Analyse	17–21 Jun 2019	600	–	8.4	12.9	6.6	20.1	8.8	3.9	1.6	16.3	10.2	10.2	3.8
InFact	20 May 2019	1,023	–	9.5	9.6	3.9	20.0	10.4	3.7	1.9	17.6	11.8	11.5	2.4
InFact	18 Mar 2019	1,015	–	8.1	11.7	4.6	23.6	6.8	4.0	1.8	18.8	14.4	7.4	4.8
Respons Analyse	13–15 Mar 2019	600	–	7.9	14.7	2.7	24.4	7.5	2.8	1.6	21.8	12.4	4.2	2.6
Norfakta	8–9 Jan 2019	600	74.0	11.9	10.5	3.8	31.3	3.5	6.5	2.8	18.2	10.1	1.4	13.1
InFact	15 Oct 2018	1,027	–	7.5	11.8	2.6	22.7	5.6	3.2	2.6	28.0	14.0	1.9	5.3
InFact	21 Aug 2018	1,062	–	6.5	13.9	4.8	19.6	7.6	3.5	2.4	24.5	15.8	0.9	4.9
InFact	13 Jun 2018	1,006	–	6.5	11.7	3.3	18.1	8.8	4.0	3.2	26.8	16.4	1.4	8.7
InFact	10 Apr 2018	1,039	–	6.9	11.8	3.6	16.9	9.4	3.5	1.6	30.5	14.9	0.8	13.6
InFact	20 Feb 2017	975	–	10.8	10.3	3.4	22.9	8.4	4.7	2.9	20.9	14.7	1.5	2.0
InFact	17 Oct 2016	1,057	–	10.6	10.7	3.6	28.5	2.1	4.3	3.0	22.6	12.6	2.0	5.9
InFact	18 Jan 2016	1,024	–	12.6	9.0	4.5	32.1	1.7	3.1	3.9	18.7	13.2	1.8	13.4
InFact	9 Oct 2015	–	–	12.8	9.0	4.0	31.1	2.3	4.5	2.6	20.4	11.6	1.7	10.7
2015 elections	14 Sep 2015	–	59.6	14.4	7.9	4.4	29.8	2.2	4.9	3.1	20.3	10.8	2.1	9.5

==== Drammen ====
Polling firm	Fieldwork date	Sample size	Resp.	R	SV	MDG	Ap	Sp	V	KrF	H	FrP	Others	Lead
2019 elections	9 Sep 2019	48,164	60.8	2.5	4.5	8.6	26.2	8.0	2.1	2.2	25.7	10.7	9.6	0.5
Sentio	9–16 Aug 2019	600	–	4.0	6.5	7.1	28.9	6.3	2.7	3.1	23.7	7.6	10.0	5.2
Sentio	29–30 May 2019	600	–	4.4	5.7	7.3	24.8	5.2	1.4	2.1	24.5	11.9	12.6	0.3
Sentio	8–20 Nov 2018	600	68.0	2.2	3.5	7.8	32.7	3.9	1.9	2.3	31.9	10.0	3.7	0.8
2015 elections	14 Sep 2015	–	55.6	0.9	3.1	5.1	31.5	2.4	3.5	3.7	37.0	10.8	1.9	5.5

==== Sandefjord ====
Polling firm	Fieldwork date	Sample size	Resp.	R	SV	MDG	Ap	Sp	V	KrF	H	FrP	Others	Lead
2019 elections	9 Sep 2019	30,297	61.0	2.5	4.8	5.2	25.4	10.0	5.7	3.1	32.5	8.1	2.8	7.1
InFact	Sep 3 2019	1,013	–	3.8	5.1	4.8	26.1	9.5	5.2	3.2	30.0	9.6	2.6	3.9
InFact	17 Jun 2019	1,028	–	3.6	5.7	–	24.5	7.2	4.2	3.1	32.5	12.1	2.2	8.0
2015 elections	14 Sep 2015	–	55.9	–	3.8	3.5	26.1	2.3	6.1	4.7	42.8	10.6	–	16.7

==== Asker ====
Polling firm	Fieldwork date	Sample size	Resp.	R	SV	MDG	Ap	Sp	V	KrF	H	FrP	Others	Lead
2019 elections	9 Sep 2019	48,965	68.2	2.5	4.6	10.5	16.1	6.0	5.8	1.9	43.1	7.3	2.2	26.0
Sentio	4 Sep 2019	–	–	3.4	5.2	9.8	19.9	4.3	5.7	2.2	37.3	9.0	2.3	17.4
Sentio	23–28 Aug 2019	500	–	2.3	5.5	13.5	19.5	4.0	5.9	2.8	36.8	5.9	3.8	17.3
Sentio	3 Jul 2019	–	–	2.2	3.3	9.7	17.9	3.2	6.0	1.6	43.2	8.9	4.0	25.3
Sentio	13–15 May 2019	500	66.6	4.4	5.2	5.6	18.5	2.9	7.2	1.8	44.2	8.3	1.8	25.7
2015 elections	14 Sep 2015	–	63.8	1.0	2.9	7.2	18.8	1.8	8.0	2.8	47.7	7.8	1.8	28.9

==== Nordre Follo ====
Polling firm	Fieldwork date	Sample size	Resp.	R	SV	MDG	Ap	Sp	V	KrF	H	FrP	Others	Lead
2019 elections	9 Sep 2019	31,260	69.7	3.0	5.4	10.2	23.4	7.1	6.1	2.5	29.9	8.3	4.1	6.5
Sentio	12–14 Aug 2019	500	67.8	3.1	6.8	10.3	25.3	4.7	4.1	4.0	32.5	7.3	2.1	7.2
Sentio	2–8 Apr 2019	500	64.4	1.4	8.0	6.9	25.9	4.1	4.3	3.5	35.9	6.9	2.3	10.0
Sentio	9–12 Oct 2018	500	–	3.1	5.8	4.7	27.3	2.4	5.3	3.5	38.7	6.9	2.3	11.4
2015 elections	14 Sep 2015	–	–	1.4	4.3	6.0	28.9	2.1	6.0	4.1	37.6	8.1	1.6	8.7

==== Sarpsborg ====
Polling firm	Fieldwork date	Sample size	Resp.	R	SV	MDG	Ap	Sp	V	KrF	H	FrP	Others	Lead
2019 elections	9 Sep 2019	25,431	57.1	4.2	2.4	4.0	34.5	10.8	1.2	4.0	9.8	10.4	18.8	23.7
Sentio	3–6 Jun 2019	600	63.2	1.8	1.3	4.3	37.6	7.8	0.6	3.5	16.3	8.8	18.0	21.3
Sentio	5–10 Mar 2019	600	–	3.9	2.9	1.7	38.8	9.2	0.0	3.2	17.7	9.3	14.9	21.1
Sentio	8–11 Oct 2018	500	–	2.7	1.0	1.6	44.9	5.5	0.7	6.1	18.5	13.0	6.1	26.4
2015 elections	14 Sep 2015	–	51.4	1.0	1.8	3.2	50.5	3.7	1.7	5.5	15.8	12.9	3.9	34.7

==== Skien ====
Polling firm	Fieldwork date	Sample size	Resp.	R	SV	MDG	Ap	Sp	V	KrF	H	FrP	Others	Lead
2019 elections	9 Sep 2019	25,413	58.3	4.7	5.8	5.4	31.9	10.3	2.1	5.6	17.9	9.8	6.6	14.0
Sentio	9–25 May 2019	500	66.4	3.7	3.5	4.2	38.1	7.3	2.0	6.3	17.1	11.4	6.4	21.0
Norfakta	20–22 May 2019	601	69.0	4.4	4.7	4.8	35.4	7.5	2.7	4.4	16.2	13.6	6.9	19.2
Sentio	27 Feb 2019	750	–	3.4	4.0	4.1	36.5	6.9	1.6	5.0	19.5	9.4	9.7	17.0
2015 elections	14 Sep 2015	–	54.6	1.6	4.0	3.5	34.9	3.0	3.5	7.5	15.3	11.5	15.2	19.7

==== Bodø ====
Polling firm	Fieldwork date	Sample size	Resp.	R	SV	MDG	Ap	Sp	V	KrF	H	FrP	Others	Lead
2019 elections	9 Sep 2019	25,525	62.6	8.0	5.0	6.0	27.3	9.9	4.3	2.0	25.7	11.3	0.5	1.6
InFact	9 Aug 2019	1,020	–	8.6	6.0	4.1	23.8	9.5	3.0	1.4	29.6	12.9	1.0	5.8
InFact	21 Jun 2019	–	–	8.3	5.3	4.0	25.8	8.6	2.5	2.2	27.2	15.3	0.7	1.4
Respons Analyse	20–27 May 2019	800	72.0	11.8	5.5	3.8	25.6	5.8	2.9	1.9	32.8	7.9	2.0	7.2
Sentio	8–12 Apr 2019	600	–	7.3	6.3	3.1	31.2	6.0	3.6	1.0	33.3	6.9	1.3	2.1
InFact	5 Mar 2019	852	–	8.7	5.2	3.0	26.1	8.7	2.6	2.6	27.0	15.8	0.1	0.9
InFact	6 Sep 2018	819	–	5.8	5.8	2.2	25.2	5.7	4.3	2.1	31.4	17.1	0.3	6.2
InFact	20 Apr 2018	645	–	6.7	6.0	2.5	21.1	7.3	2.7	2.5	32.0	18.7	0.5	10.9
InFact	14 Dec 2017	930	–	6.0	6.2	2.9	22.2	4.5	4.3	2.9	33.3	17.2	0.5	11.1
Respons Analyse	5–7 Sep 2017	600	–	6.4	6.4	4.0	23.7	6.0	3.0	1.6	38.6	10.1	0.2	14.9
InFact	7 Mar 2017	639	–	7.2	3.7	1.9	23.9	4.9	3.4	2.4	38.4	14.1	0.2	14.5
2015 elections	14 Sep 2015	–	58.6	10.4	3.8	2.9	30.2	3.3	3.2	2.6	33.8	9.5	0.4	3.6

==== Ålesund ====
Polling firm	Fieldwork date	Sample size	Resp.	R	SV	MDG	Ap	Sp	V	KrF	H	FrP	Others	Lead
2019 elections	9 Sep 2019	30,868	60.9	1.8	3.2	4.7	20.4	12.8	2.1	5.9	19.5	17.4	12.2	0.9
Respons Analyse	26–29 Aug 2019	601	–	1.4	3.8	8.0	26.4	11.4	2.8	6.3	16.9	13.9	9.1	9.5
Respons Analyse	25–28 Feb 2019	800	71.0	3.3	4.5	2.7	26.1	10.1	4.7	6.4	25.3	12.6	4.3	0.8
2015 elections	14 Sep 2015	–	52.0	0.5	2.3	2.4	36.2	1.8	5.5	10.0	18.5	15.8	6.8	17.7

==== Larvik ====
Polling firm	Fieldwork date	Sample size	Resp.	R	SV	MDG	Ap	Sp	V	KrF	H	FrP	Others	Lead
2019 elections	9 Sep 2019	22,841	60.2	3.8	4.4	5.5	22.2	11.1	3.3	4.3	19.7	14.3	11.3	2.5
InFact	28 Aug 2019	623	–	5.5	7.1	3.6	21.4	10.1	4.3	2.6	20.1	16.5	9.2	1.3
InFact	12 Jun 2019	–	–	2.2	5.5	5.9	28.2	10.4	3.4	3.7	23.8	15.1	1.8	4.4
InFact	17 Jan 2019	647	–	2.6	5.2	2.2	26.8	6.6	2.4	4.4	26.4	15.9	7.4	0.4
InFact	19 Mar 2018	600	–	2.5	3.5	1.8	24.9	7.9	2.0	4.9	25.9	21.7	4.1	1.0
InFact	15 Sep 2016	400	–	2.4	2.4	5.9	33.7	4.1	5.3	5.3	21.9	18.9	0.0	11.8
2015 elections	14 Sep 2015	–	56.7	1.5	2.7	4.2	37.4	4.2	3.6	6.8	21.6	18.0	–	15.8

==== Tønsberg ====
Polling firm	Fieldwork date	Sample size	Resp.	R	SV	MDG	Ap	Sp	V	KrF	H	FrP	Others	Lead
2019 elections	9 Sep 2019	28,248	63.9	2.8	5.9	7.4	26.8	12.6	4.0	3.9	26.1	9.2	1.2	0.7
Sentio	12–16 Aug 2019	500	–	3.8	6.9	9.7	28.7	10.4	2.8	3.9	26.0	7.8	0.5	2.7
Sentio	2–5 Apr 2019	500	–	3.8	5.8	5.1	32.5	12.3	3.0	2.9	25.1	9.0	0.5	7.4
InFact	17 Sep 2018	626	–	4.2	4.4	2.3	27.6	7.1	2.7	2.9	32.4	15.0	1.4	4.8
InFact	8 Jan 2018	564	–	2.0	6.1	2.8	27.1	4.1	5.0	5.0	33.2	14.5	0.0	6.1
2015 elections	14 Sep 2015	–	57.6	1.1	4.0	5.4	35.2	2.7	5.2	5.1	28.5	11.8	1.0	6.7

==== Arendal ====
Polling firm	Fieldwork date	Sample size	Resp.	R	SV	MDG	Ap	Sp	V	KrF	H	FrP	Others	Lead
2019 elections	9 Sep 2019	22,037	62.0	2.0	7.6	3.6	26.8	6.9	3.4	5.7	19.2	11.9	12.9	7.6
InFact	26–27 Aug 2019	512	–	2.7	7.3	4.4	25.6	7.6	3.4	6.2	19.4	15.1	8.4	6.2
Respons Analyse	27 May–6 Jun 2019	602	–	1.5	6.2	3.9	30.8	7.9	3.1	4.0	23.2	10.7	8.7	7.6
2015 elections	14 Sep 2015	–	54.9	0.9	3.8	3.6	37.8	3.2	5.5	7.9	18.4	15.0	3.9	19.4

==== Indre Østfold ====
Polling firm	Fieldwork date	Sample size	Resp.	R	SV	MDG	Ap	Sp	V	KrF	H	FrP	Others	Lead
2019 elections	9 Sep 2019	20,307	57.4	2.4	3.6	3.7	19.9	31.0	2.0	3.4	25.6	7.8	0.6	5.4
Sentio	17–20 Aug 2019	400	–	2.1	2.4	7.3	23.5	25.8	2.5	4.4	23.2	8.3	0.3	2.3
Sentio	1–4 Apr 2019	600	–	2.0	3.9	3.7	26.7	22.9	2.7	2.7	25.8	5.8	3.8	0.9
2015 elections	14 Sep 2015	–	–	0.0	2.2	2.5	28.2	14.1	3.9	6.2	33.3	9.6	0.0	5.1

==== Karmøy ====
Polling firm	Fieldwork date	Sample size	Resp.	R	SV	MDG	Ap	Sp	V	KrF	H	FrP	Others	Lead
2019 elections	9 Sep 2019	19,863	61.4	1.4	4.3	3.4	23.7	7.9	2.0	10.7	19.3	12.4	14.8	4.4
InFact	26 Aug 2019	1,015	–	1.6	7.3	4.3	22.5	7.3	1.2	11.5	20.8	12.6	11.0	1.7
InFact	21 Mar 2019	–	–	1.5	4.5	2.6	21.0	7.5	0.6	12.0	27.0	19.1	4.1	6.0
2015 elections	14 Sep 2015	–	56.9	0.4	2.4	1.9	33.4	4.3	2.6	15.1	18.3	19.7	2.0	13.7

==== Ullensaker ====
Polling firm	Fieldwork date	Sample size	Resp.	R	SV	MDG	Ap	Sp	V	KrF	H	FrP	Others	Lead
2019 elections	9 Sep 2019	16,492	56.7	2.9	4.1	3.8	27.0	12.6	3.0	1.9	14.8	29.6	0.4	2.6
InFact	9 Jan 2019	456	–	2.0	5.8	2.6	31.4	6.7	1.2	1.7	21.8	22.1	4.7	9.3
Norstat	24–28 Sep 2018	600	–	–	–	1.4	32.6	6.5	2.5	1.7	22.4	27.4	5.4	5.2
2015 elections	14 Sep 2015	–	53.8	2.3		2.6	32.7	5.1	3.9	2.6	18.6	29.8	2.3	2.9

==== Haugesund ====
Polling firm	Fieldwork date	Sample size	Resp.	R	SV	MDG	Ap	Sp	V	KrF	H	FrP	Others	Lead
2019 elections	9 Sep 2019	17,496	59.5	2.0	5.3	5.1	31.0	5.1	3.0	3.6	27.8	12.6	4.5	3.2
InFact	20 Aug 2019	1,002	–	2.5	6.4	5.3	26.4	4.8	4.4	4.1	28.1	15.7	3.5	1.7
InFact	18 Mar 2019	600	–	3.0	6.0	3.2	29.6	3.4	3.0	3.8	30.2	16.1	1.8	0.6
Respons Analyse	6–12 Feb 2019	600	77.0	1.4	6.3	1.2	31.3	4.6	3.7	3.3	31.2	14.6	2.4	0.1
2015 elections	14 Sep 2015	–	55.7	0.4	3.5	3.6	40.2	1.9	4.9	5.3	22.3	14.0	3.9	17.9

==== Porsgrunn ====
Polling firm	Fieldwork date	Sample size	Resp.	R	SV	MDG	Ap	Sp	V	KrF	H	FrP	Others	Lead
2019 elections	9 Sep 2019	17,623	60.7	6.8	5.8	6.0	35.5	9.1	3.5	6.0	15.0	8.6	3.8	20.5
Sentio	9–25 May 2019	400	66.3	5.6	4.3	6.9	36.1	5.6	4.9	3.6	23.2	5.8	3.9	12.9
Norfakta	20–22 May 2019	600	72.0	7.8	5.3	5.5	40.8	6.1	4.6	4.2	16.9	7.3	1.6	23.9
2015 elections	14 Sep 2015	–	55.8	3.4	3.7	4.4	40.6	1.5	5.1	5.0	19.6	10.2	6.5	21.0

==== Ringsaker ====
Polling firm	Fieldwork date	Sample size	Resp.	R	SV	MDG	Ap	Sp	V	KrF	H	FrP	Others	Lead
2019 elections	9 Sep 2019	16,289	59.1	1.9	3.3	3.6	44.8	25.2	1.0	1.6	7.2	4.2	7.2	19.6
Sentio	23–28 Aug 2019	400	–	2.8	6.5	4.8	39.9	21.9	1.3	2.0	8.7	4.7	7.3	18.0
InFact	6 Aug 2019	730	–	3.3	4.3	4.8	39.2	23.8	1.1	1.6	9.0	7.5	5.4	15.4
Sentio	24 Apr–6 May 2019	400	–	1.3	6.2	2.8	37.5	25.4	4.1	0.3	8.3	6.0	8.0	12.1
Sentio	19–29 Nov 2018	400	–	0.3	3.1	4.1	45.0	18.8	1.0	2.4	13.7	4.4	7.2	26.2
2015 elections	14 Sep 2015	–	54.6	–	2.5	3.1	50.4	12.6	3.2	2.7	10.0	5.4	10.0	37.8

==== Moss ====
Polling firm	Fieldwork date	Sample size	Resp.	R	SV	MDG	Ap	Sp	V	KrF	H	FrP	Others	Lead
2019 elections	9 Sep 2019	24,173	61.8	7.0	6.0	5.9	27.6	7.2	4.6	2.4	19.0	8.7	11.5	8.6
InFact	5 Sep 2019	–	–	7.4	6.9	4.9	24.5	5.9	4.9	2.4	16.3	10.3	16.5	8.2
InFact	21 Aug 2019	–	–	8.2	6.4	5.8	22.9	6.8	3.9	1.4	19.0	9.0	16.7	3.9
InFact	7 Aug 2019	1,052	–	7.7	5.8	6.8	25.8	6.0	2.6	2.2	20.3	8.9	14.1	5.5
InFact	18 Jun 2019	1,089	–	7.5	5.1	4.2	30.8	5.8	2.9	1.7	20.9	10.5	10.6	9.9
InFact	28 Sep 2016	611	–	5.3	4.4	4.9	46.4	–	3.8	2.3	23.5	9.3	–	22.9
2015 elections	14 Sep 2015	–	58.5	6.0	3.4	5.2	40.8	–	4.8	2.6	26.8	10.3	–	14.0

==== Lillestrøm ====
Polling firm	Fieldwork date	Sample size	Resp.	R	SV	MDG	Ap	Sp	V	KrF	H	FrP	Others	Lead
2019 elections	9 Sep 2019	39,753	60.6	2.6	5.0	6.4	29.9	11.9	2.9	2.4	19.6	10.7	8.7	10.3
InFact	2 Sep 2019	1,036	–	3.6	5.3	5.5	31.0	10.8	3.1	2.8	19.6	11.5	6.7	11.4
InFact	24 Jun 2019	1,004	–	3.5	5.0	4.3	31.3	9.3	2.1	2.8	19.3	11.7	10.6	12.0
InFact	28 Dec 2018	810	–	4.0	4.8	2.3	35.7	6.6	1.8	3.5	22.5	15.5	3.2	13.2
InFact	17 Sep 2018	846	–	3.3	4.3	2.7	34.3	7.7	2.3	2.7	25.9	14.2	2.4	8.4
2015 elections	14 Sep 2015	–	–	0.6	3.4	3.6	37.9	4.6	4.0	3.3	25.9	12.4	4.5	12.0

=== By county ===
In case of the merger of counties, the 2015 results listed are the sum total of the results for each party's electoral lists in the original counties in 2015.

==== Agder ====
Agder consists of the former counties of Aust-Agder and Vest-Agder.

Polling firm	Fieldwork date	Sample size	Resp.	R	SV	MDG	Ap	Sp	V	KrF	H	FrP	Others	Lead
2019 elections	9 Sep 2019	142,530	59.8	2.5	4.4	5.8	20.7	9.9	3.1	13.1	21.1	9.4	10.0	0.4
Sentio	2–3 Sep 2019	1,000	–	1.2	5.6	7.7	24.8	10.2	3.6	11.1	18.5	8.1	9.3	6.3
Respons Analyse	26 Aug–3 Sep 2019	600	–	4.6	6.1	4.7	21.5	9.0	2.8	14.9	21.0	10.9	4.5	0.5
Respons Analyse	4–8 Mar 2019	600	–	3.5	4.1	3.6	23.4	9.0	2.7	13.3	22.7	13.1	3.6	0.7
Respons Analyse	7–9 Nov 2018	800	77.0	1.5	4.1	1.7	24.5	8.7	2.9	12.8	28.5	14.0	1.3	4.0
Respons Analyse	27–31 Aug 2018	800	73.0	1.3	5.0	1.9	21.4	7.8	2.8	10.3	30.7	14.6	4.3	9.3
Respons Analyse	6–9 Aug 2018	802	74.0	2.5	4.9	1.8	23.3	8.4	3.1	11.9	27.2	14.9	1.1	3.9
2015 elections	14 Sep 2015	–	53.9	1.1	2.7	3.8	28.0	6.0	4.6	15.3	21.7	11.9	4.9	6.3

==== Innlandet ====
Innlandet consists of the former counties of Hedmark and Oppland.

Polling firm	Fieldwork date	Sample size	Resp.	R	SV	MDG	Ap	Sp	V	KrF	H	FrP	Others	Lead
2019 elections	9 Sep 2019	170,218	56.6	2.8	4.9	4.6	34.1	28.7	2.1	1.9	11.7	5.6	3.7	5.4
Sentio	23–26 Aug 2019	600	–	2.7	6.3	6.9	31.7	27.5	3.1	3.2	10.2	5.3	2.8	4.2
Sentio	13 Aug 2019	–	–	2.8	4.6	6.9	35.8	28.1	2.9	2.0	11.2	3.8	1.9	7.7
Sentio	3–6 Jun 2019	600	–	3.1	4.7	4.4	33.7	29.8	1.2	1.2	12.8	6.0	2.5	3.9
Sentio	6 Mar 2019	600	–	3.8	6.2	2.9	38.1	24.1	3.0	2.0	14.1	4.6	1.2	14.0
Markedsinfo	11–13 Nov 2018	601	–	4.9	5.1	1.4	41.0	20.2	1.6	1.7	16.0	6.3	1.8	20.8
Markedsinfo	11–12 Jun 2018	602	–	4.5	4.7	1.9	35.3	23.1	1.8	2.5	17.5	6.1	2.5	12.2
Markedsinfo	1–6 Feb 2018	600	–	4.0	4.2	4.0	39.6	23.0	2.1	1.6	14.8	5.2	1.5	16.6
2015 elections	14 Sep 2015	–	64.0	1.3	3.5	4.1	43.7	17.2	3.9	2.8	13.9	6.7	2.8	26.4

==== Møre og Romsdal ====
Polling firm	Fieldwork date	Sample size	Resp.	R	SV	MDG	Ap	Sp	V	KrF	H	FrP	Others	Lead
2019 elections	9 Sep 2019	119,324	57.4	1.8	5.1	4.7	18.1	17.9	3.1	5.6	15.0	17.1	11.7	0.2
Respons Analyse	12–15 Aug 2019	800	–	2.2	3.8	5.1	17.6	17.7	2.6	5.5	20.1	19.3	6.1	0.8
Respons Analyse	17–21 Jun 2019	800	–	3.3	5.4	4.5	18.8	17.4	3.7	5.2	20.3	16.0	1.7	1.5
Respons Analyse	19–22 Nov 2018	600	–	0.8	4.9	1.9	24.0	15.3	1.8	6.5	25.0	18.1	1.0	1.0
Sentio	20–25 Aug 2018	1,000	63.6	2.8	4.1	1.7	23.4	14.9	3.5	7.9	20.3	13.2	8.4	3.1
Respons Analyse	13–17 Aug 2018	600	75.0	1.1	4.0	2.2	19.6	17.2	3.5	4.5	24.5	21.4	2.1	3.1
Respons Analyse	6–10 Aug 2018	800	81.0	1.4	5.6	1.7	19.2	15.8	2.7	7.3	25.5	17.7	3.2	6.3
2015 elections	14 Sep 2015	–	51.9	0.5	2.7	2.7	24.3	10.6	5.6	8.3	18.0	13.1	14.2	6.2

==== Nordland ====
Polling firm	Fieldwork date	Sample size	Resp.	R	SV	MDG	Ap	Sp	V	KrF	H	FrP	Others	Lead
2019 elections	9 Sep 2019	107,849	56.1	5.5	6.2	4.2	26.8	25.3	2.6	2.5	15.8	9.6	1.5	1.5
Respons Analyse	29 Aug–4 Sep 2019	600	–	5.6	7.5	4.3	22.8	28.4	2.2	2.2	15.6	10.6	0.8	5.6
Sentio	28–29 Jun 2019	600	64.5	6.0	8.3	2.6	27.2	19.6	2.2	1.4	21.5	9.0	2.3	5.7
Sentio	28–31 Jan 2019	600	59.3	6.2	6.8	3.5	29.7	17.0	2.4	2.4	21.4	8.4	2.0	8.3
2015 elections	14 Sep 2015	–	51.8	5.2	5.4	3.2	36.0	9.9	3.6	3.3	19.7	10.7	3.0	16.3

==== Rogaland ====
Polling firm	Fieldwork date	Sample size	Resp.	R	SV	MDG	Ap	Sp	V	KrF	H	FrP	Others	Lead
2019 elections	9 Sep 2019	222,567	61.2	2.3	4.1	5.1	22.3	10.5	3.0	8.6	22.1	12.6	9.3	0.2
Respons Analyse	22–28 Aug 2019	607	–	0.9	4.7	6.2	21.2	11.2	2.8	8.3	21.0	16.3	7.4	0.2
Respons Analyse	9–13 Aug 2019	607	–	2.0	3.8	4.8	23.6	10.4	3.0	7.4	24.4	12.6	8.0	0.8
Respons Analyse	4–8 Mar 2019	601	–	2.2	4.6	2.4	23.7	10.3	2.9	7.5	28.2	16.3	1.9	4.5
Respons Analyse	6–12 Feb 2019	802	75.0	2.0	5.9	2.5	26.3	8.9	2.2	8.4	26.7	15.1	2.0	0.4
Respons Analyse	28 Aug–3 Sep 2018	617	–	1.7	3.3	1.0	24.0	8.2	2.8	6.3	28.8	18.8	5.1	4.8
Respons Analyse	6–10 Aug 2018	800	73.0	1.1	5.1	3.7	22.1	9.7	2.9	8.4	29.4	15.4	2.2	7.3
Respons Analyse	4–18 Apr 2018	800	80.0	1.6	4.9	2.0	21.3	7.0	3.5	8.0	32.9	17.5	1.3	11.6
2015 elections	14 Sep 2015	–	55.1	0.7	2.8	3.7	27.8	7.2	4.4	11.1	24.2	15.6	2.4	3.6

==== Troms og Finnmark ====
Troms og Finnmark consists of the former counties of Troms and Finnmark.

Polling firm	Fieldwork date	Sample size	Resp.	R	SV	MDG	Ap	Sp	V	KrF	H	FrP	Others	Lead
2019 elections	9 Sep 2019	111,455	57.7	3.9	10.8	4.8	24.9	24.1	2.6	3.0	13.3	10.0	2.6	0.8
Respons Analyse	29 Aug–4 Sep 2019	600	–	4.9	12.5	4.7	22.4	21.1	2.0	3.0	15.2	12.3	0.5	1.3
InFact	14 Aug 2019	1,898	–	5.0	10.1	3.4	22.5	24.0	2.0	2.7	13.7	12.8	4.0	1.5
InFact	25 Jun 2019	1,898	–	4.9	11.2	4.6	21.1	21.8	1.7	2.9	13.6	12.5	5.5	0.7
InFact	13 Jun 2019	1,024	–	3.5	11.4	5.4	22.8	18.5	3.5	2.6	14.4	11.8	6.2	4.3
Respons Analyse	19–20 Mar 2019	2,000	–	4.9	9.8	2.2	25.0	22.1	2.3	3.2	15.1	13.8	1.5	2.9
Respons Analyse	4–6 Feb 2019	800	68.0	4.3	10.1	2.4	32.3	15.9	2.2	2.7	14.0	15.1	1.0	16.4
2015 elections	14 Sep 2015	–	52.7	4.6	6.1	3.9	36.9	8.7	5.4	3.6	16.3	12.1	2.4	20.6

==== Trøndelag ====
Trøndelag consists of the former counties of Sør-Trøndelag and Nord-Trøndelag.

Polling firm	Fieldwork date	Sample size	Resp.	R	SV	MDG	Ap	Sp	V	KrF	H	FrP	Others	Lead
2019 elections	9 Sep 2019	222,579	60.8	4.5	7.3	6.8	29.9	21.3	3.0	2.5	14.9	5.2	4.7	8.6
Sentio	23–28 Aug 2019	1,000	–	4.9	10.1	7.3	29.9	19.8	2.7	2.4	13.7	5.3	3.6	10.1
Respons Analyse	26–28 Aug 2019	601	–	4.5	8.2	6.2	25.9	24.6	3.5	3.1	13.8	6.2	4.0	1.3
Respons Analyse	12–15 Aug 2019	600	–	4.5	8.4	5.9	27.2	21.9	2.7	1.7	16.5	7.3	3.9	5.3
Sentio	30 Jul–3 Aug 2019	1,000	65.6	4.9	8.5	7.4	31.6	19.5	2.6	2.4	15.3	5.7	0.7	12.1
Respons Analyse	27–31 May 2019	600	–	5.3	9.2	4.4	29.5	20.2	3.3	2.3	16.3	6.9	3.1	9.3
Respons Analyse	25–28 Feb 2019	602	72.0	5.3	10.5	4.6	29.0	17.9	2.1	3.3	17.4	7.1	1.8	11.1
Respons Analyse	14–16 Nov 2018	625	74.0	3.7	8.0	3.1	33.4	16.7	3.0	3.0	18.7	8.5	1.9	14.7
Sentio	28 Aug–6 Sep 2018	1,000	70.9	4.9	7.4	4.0	30.7	16.1	3.3	3.0	21.9	6.5	2.2	8.8
Respons Analyse	9–14 Aug 2018	602	72.0	4.0	8.7	1.5	29.0	17.3	3.7	2.9	21.1	9.9	0.8	7.9
Respons Analyse	26–28 Feb 2018	600	72.0	3.4	8.1	2.9	30.2	16.7	2.7	2.7	22.6	8.0	2.7	7.6
2015 elections	14 Sep 2015	–	55.1	1.6	5.3	5.1	40.3	13.9	4.4	3.7	16.6	6.4	2.6	23.8

==== Vestfold og Telemark ====
Vestfold og Telemark consists of the former counties of Vestfold and Telemark.

Polling firm	Fieldwork date	Sample size	Resp.	R	SV	MDG	Ap	Sp	V	KrF	H	FrP	Others	Lead
2019 elections	9 Sep 2019	195,581	58.5	3.7	4.8	6.4	29.4	14.2	2.7	4.0	21.8	9.4	3.4	7.6
Respons Analyse	24–27 Jun 2019	801	71.0	3.3	5.2	5.6	27.5	12.6	3.1	3.3	25.9	11.4	1.3	1.6
Sentio	6–11 May 2019	1,000	65.2	5.0	4.4	4.1	30.0	13.9	2.1	4.0	23.9	11.2	1.3	6.1
2015 elections	14 Sep 2015	–	53.9	1.7	3.3	4.7	35.0	7.6	4.2	5.7	24.4	12.3	1.2	10.6

==== Vestland ====
Vestland consists of the former counties of Hordaland and Sogn og Fjordane.

Polling firm	Fieldwork date	Sample size	Resp.	R	SV	MDG	Ap	Sp	V	KrF	H	FrP	FNB	Others	Lead
2019 elections	9 Sep 2019	315,131	63.7	3.4	6.4	7.1	20.4	15.7	3.5	4.9	17.9	8.6	9.1	2.9	2.5
Respons Analyse	28 Aug–3 Sep 2019	600	76.0	3.5	6.1	6.2	21.7	15.5	2.6	3.9	20.8	11.2	–	8.5	0.9
Respons Analyse	23–25 Apr 2019	600	67.0	2.9	6.6	2.5	22.5	14.5	4.0	4.1	22.4	13.6	5.7	1.2	0.1
Respons Analyse	6–9 Aug 2018	801	71.0	3.3	8.4	1.9	22.0	14.6	3.2	4.8	30.0	10.3	–	1.5	8.0
2015 elections	14 Sep 2015	–	57.5	1.6	4.7	5.1	32.1	11.2	5.1	7.1	19.6	10.8	–	2.5	12.5

==== Viken ====
Viken consists of the former counties of Buskerud, Akershus, and Østfold.

Polling firm	Fieldwork date	Sample size	Resp.	R	SV	MDG	Ap	Sp	V	KrF	H	FrP	Others	Lead
2019 elections	9 Sep 2019	566,180	58.8	3.2	4.6	7.6	24.2	13.2	3.6	2.6	25.1	8.8	7.2	0.9
Opinion Perduco	5–7 Aug 2019	600	–	2.7	4.2	7.6	25.5	13.4	4.4	0.5	27.1	9.1	5.5	1.6
InFact	13 Jun 2019	1,025	–	4.7	5.5	5.6	23.8	13.2	2.9	2.7	22.6	10.9	8.0	1.2
Respons Analyse	8–10 Apr 2019	1,000	–	3.8	6.9	3.2	27.6	10.6	3.1	3.4	28.5	11.1	1.8	0.9
Sentio	20–25 Aug 2018	1,000	67.5	2.4	4.9	5.5	29.2	8.0	3.3	3.0	32.7	8.7	2.2	3.5
2015 elections	14 Sep 2015	–	53.0	1.3	3.1	4.8	33.6	5.4	5.3	3.9	29.2	11.2	2.1	4.4

== Donations ==
According to Statistisk sentralbyrå, a total of 59.61 million NOK in campaign contributions was raised by all political parties in 2019.

Party	Donations (NOK)
Labour Party	21,898,451
Conservative Party	15,332,937
Socialist Left Party	5,658,869
Progress Party	4,980,798
Liberal Party	3,162,746
Centre Party	2,586,834
Christian Democratic Party	2,179,800
Green Party	1,711,997
Red Party	1,025,921
