= Saida Begum =

Norwegian politician (born 1987)

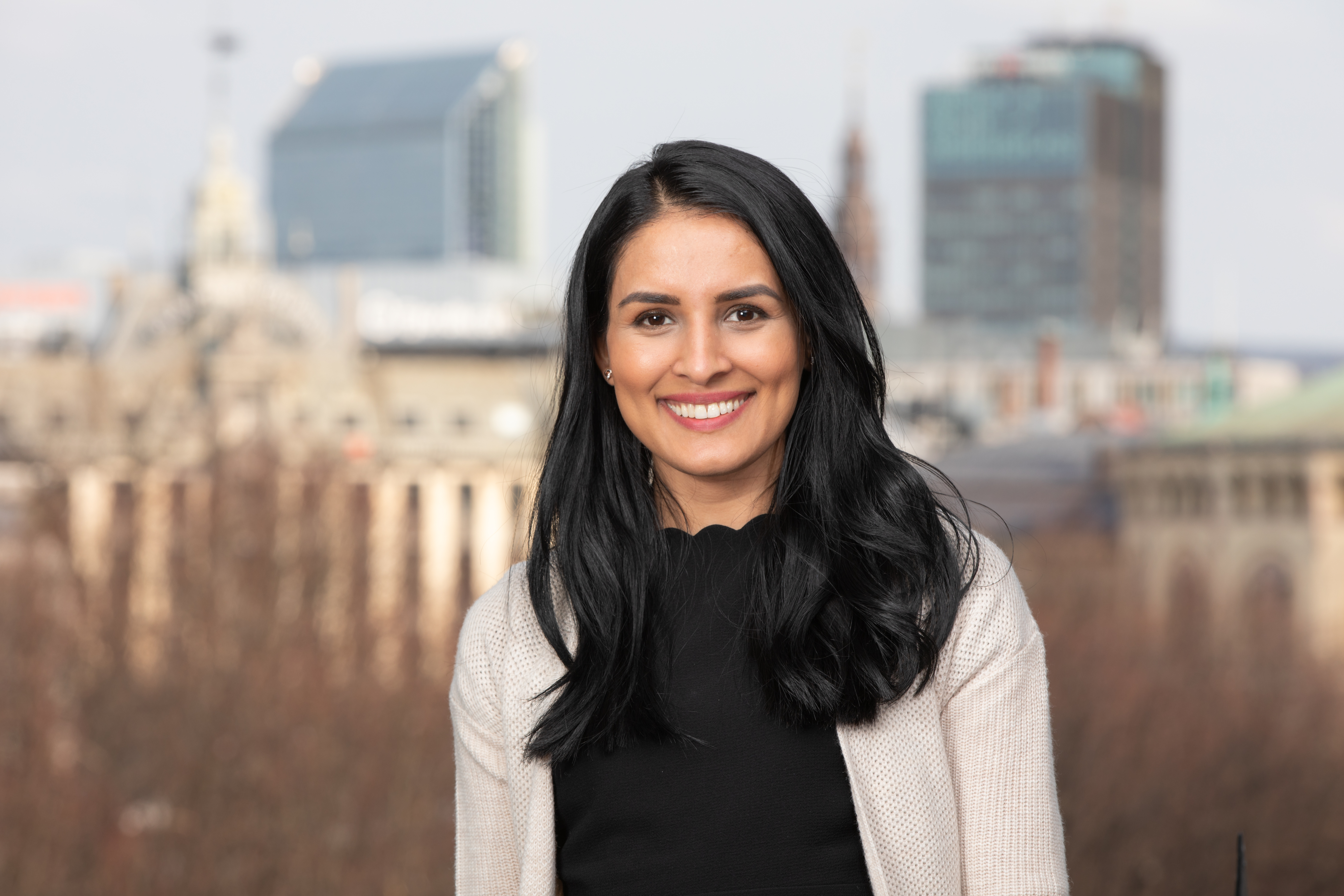
Saida Begum

Saida Roshni Begum (born 23 May 1987) is a Norwegian politician for the Conservative Party.

Her parents migrated from Pakistan to Norway in the 1970s. She was born at Aker Hospital and lived several places in Oslo, as well as in Lørenskog. Noone in her family was politically active, but Begum took membership in the Young Conservatives in 2007. She also graduated with the cand.jur. degree from the University of Oslo.

Begum was first elected to Oslo City council in 2011. Following another re-election in 2015, she stood for 2019 Norwegian local elections as the Conservative Party's mayoral candidate in Oslo. She had worked the years 2015 to 2019 as an adviser for the Conservative Party's parliamentary caucus. However, the Conservative Party did not win the 2019 election and Begum did not become mayor.

In January 2020, Begum was instead appointed State Secretary for Torbjørn Røe Isaksen in the Ministry of Labour. She remained State Secretary until Solberg's Cabinet fell in October 2021. In April 2022 she announced that she would leave Oslo city council after the 2023 Norwegian local elections. She instead opted for a career in the law firm Sands.
