= 2015 Norwegian local elections =

2015 election for the municipalities and counties of Norway

← 2011	14 September 2015	2019 →
- Turnout: 59.7%
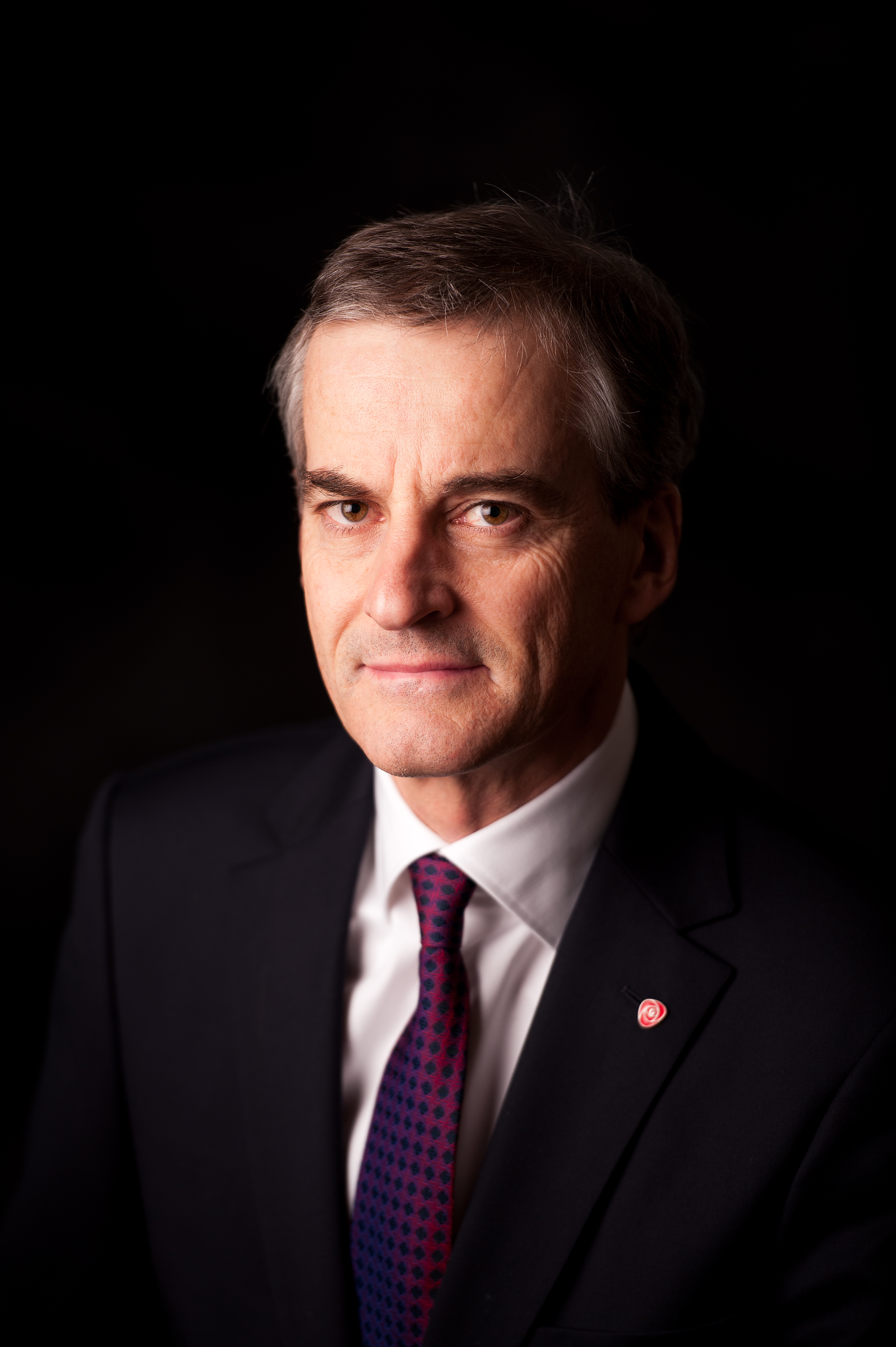

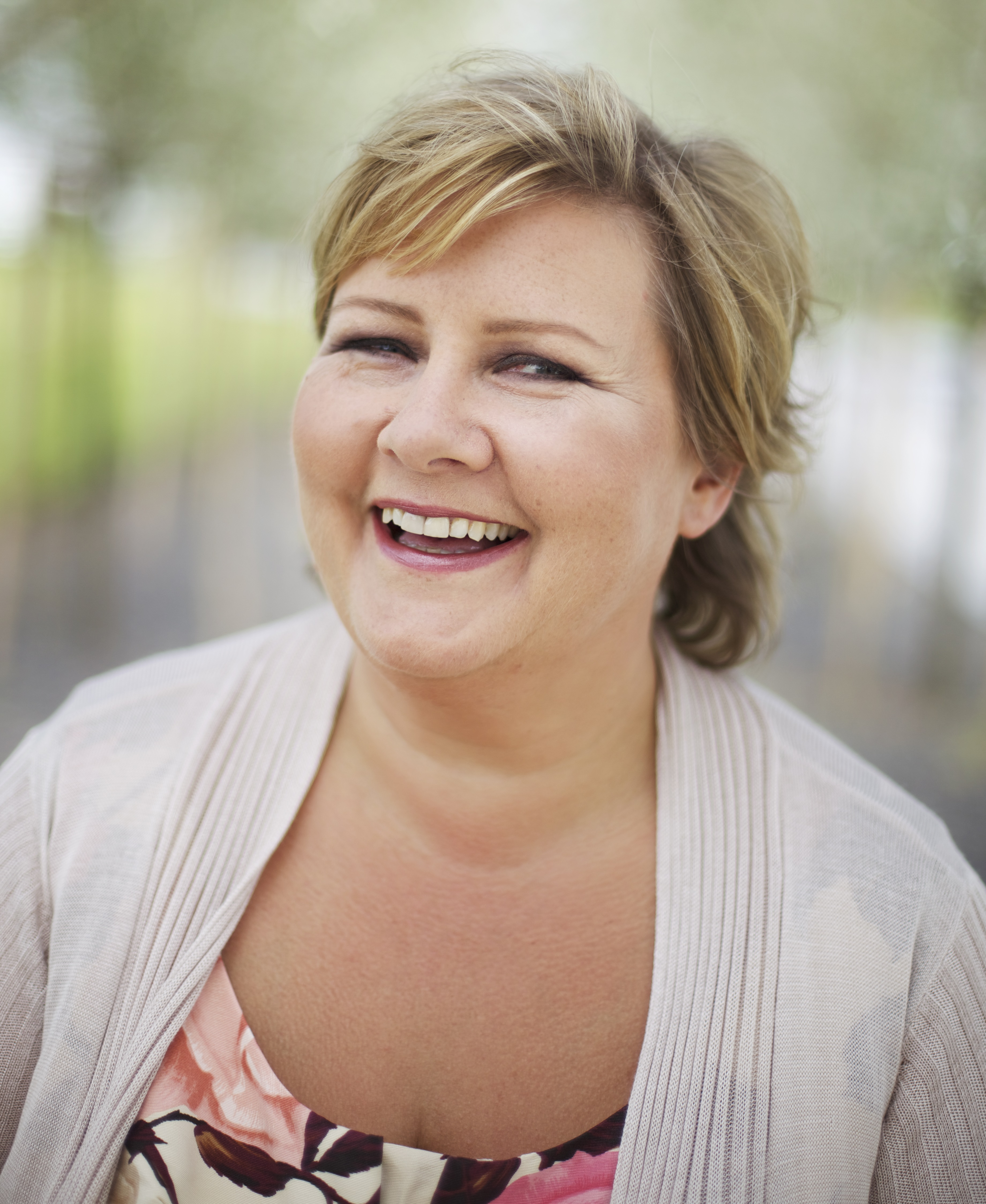

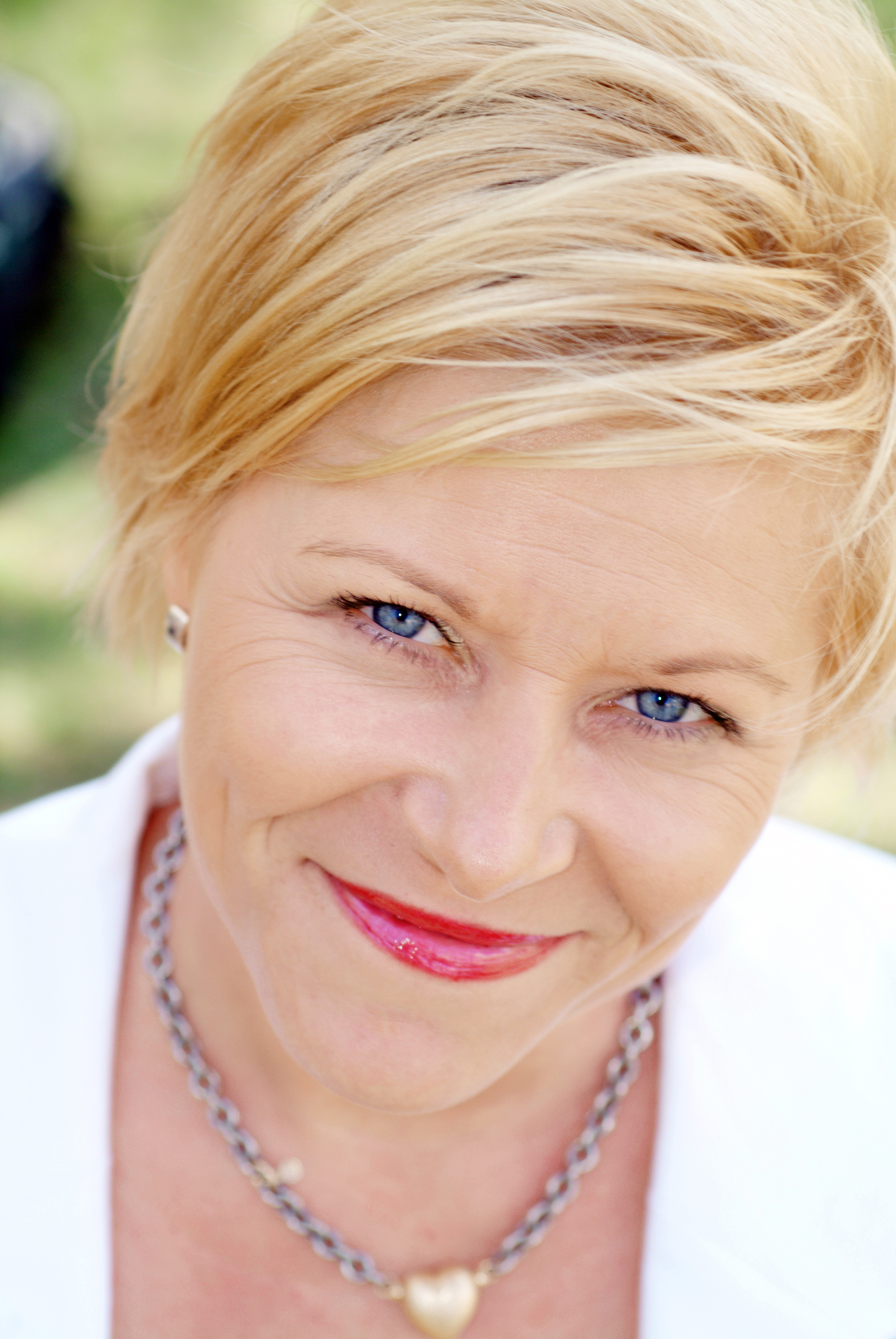

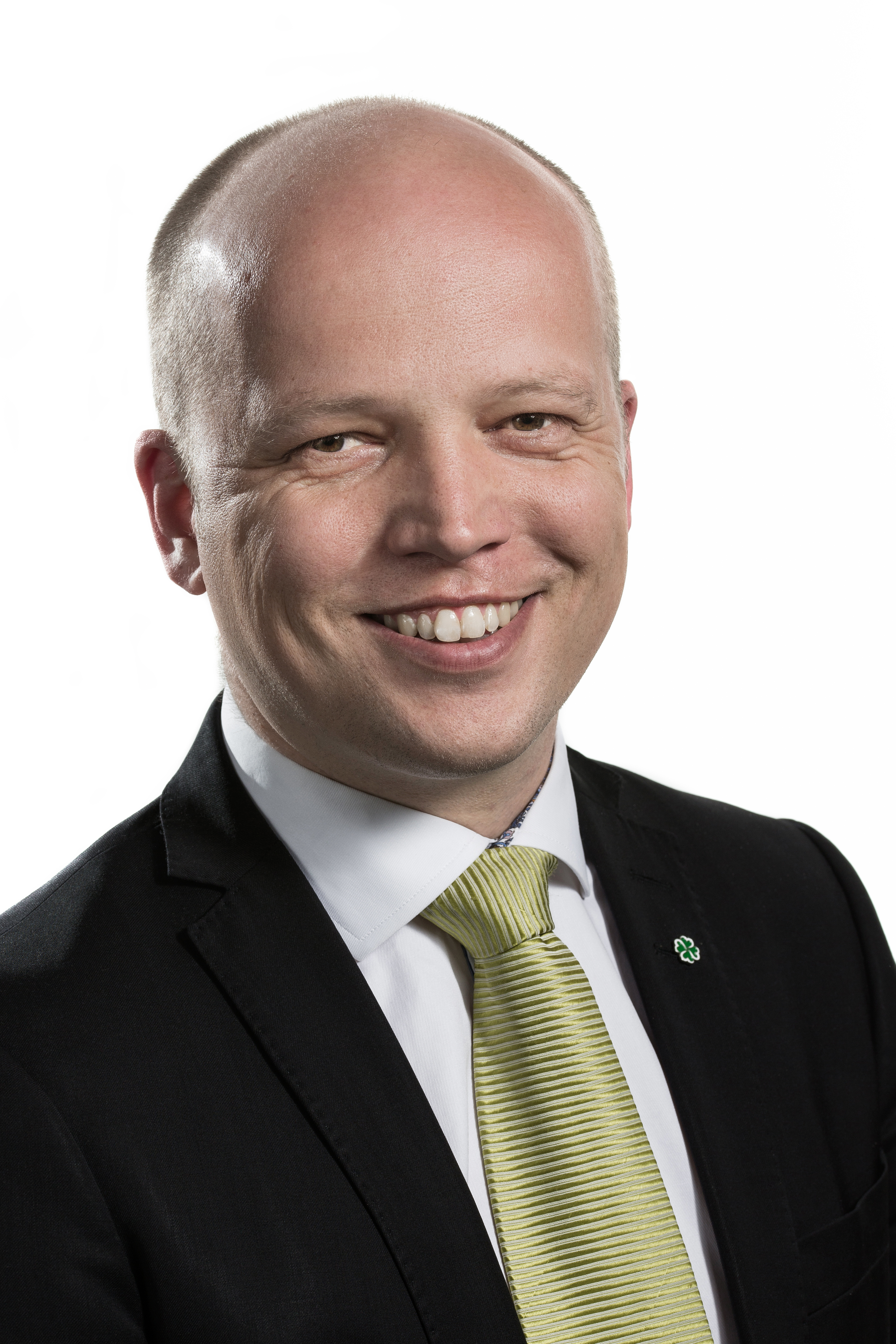

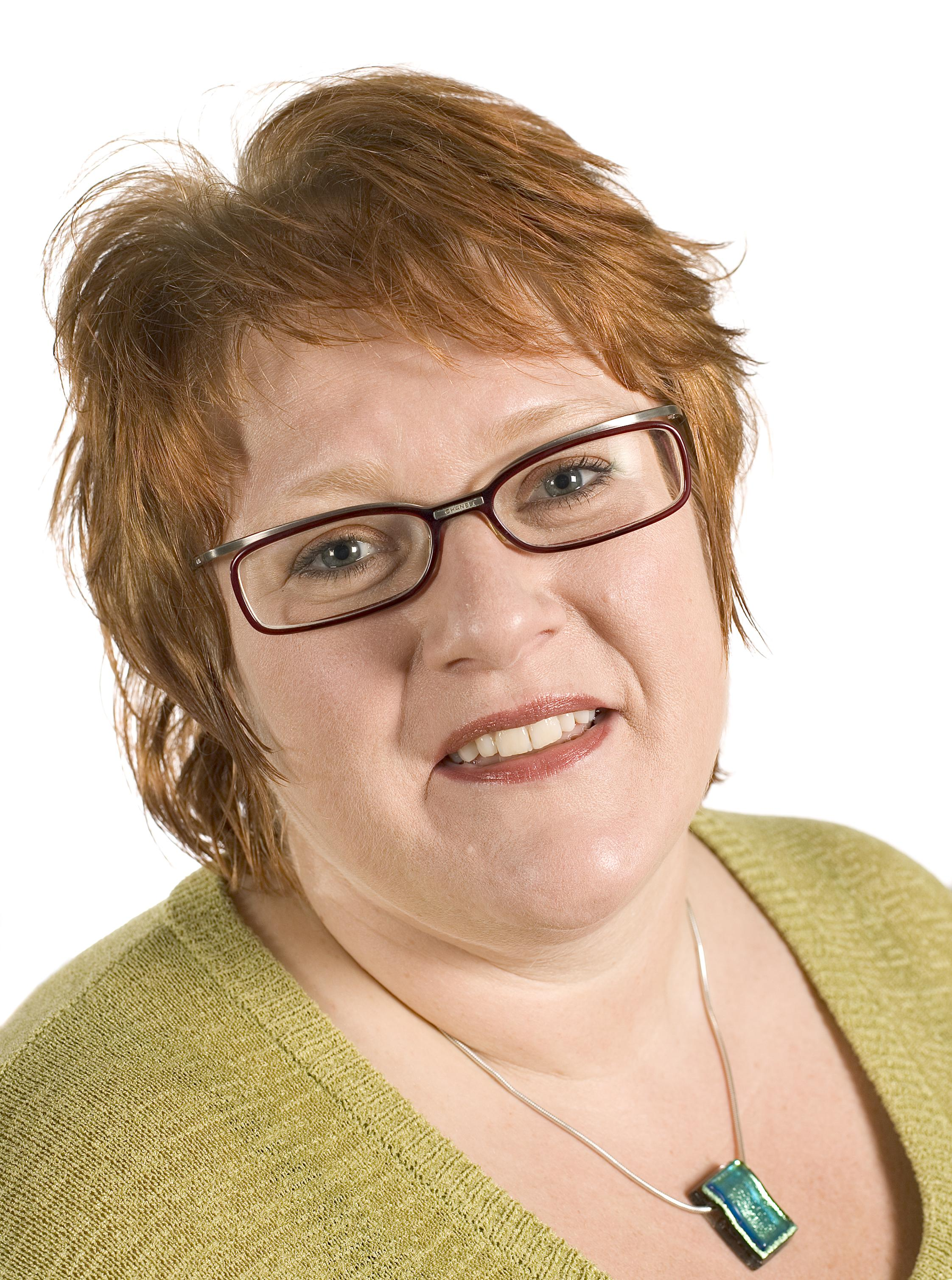

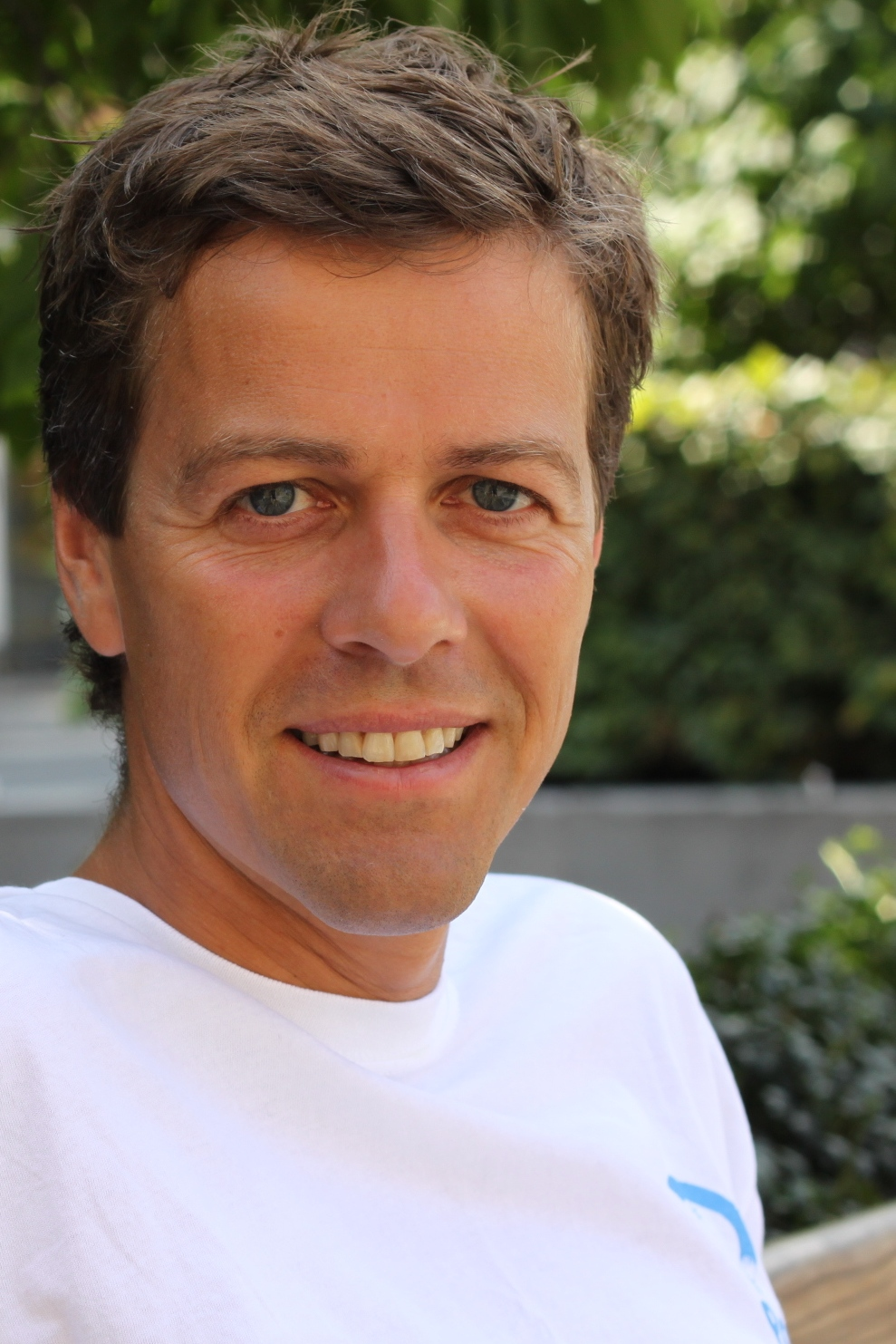

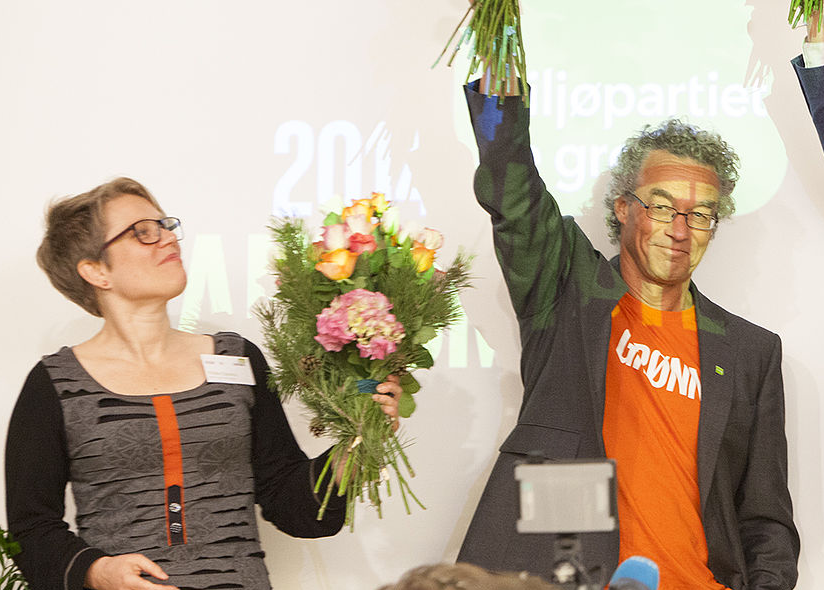

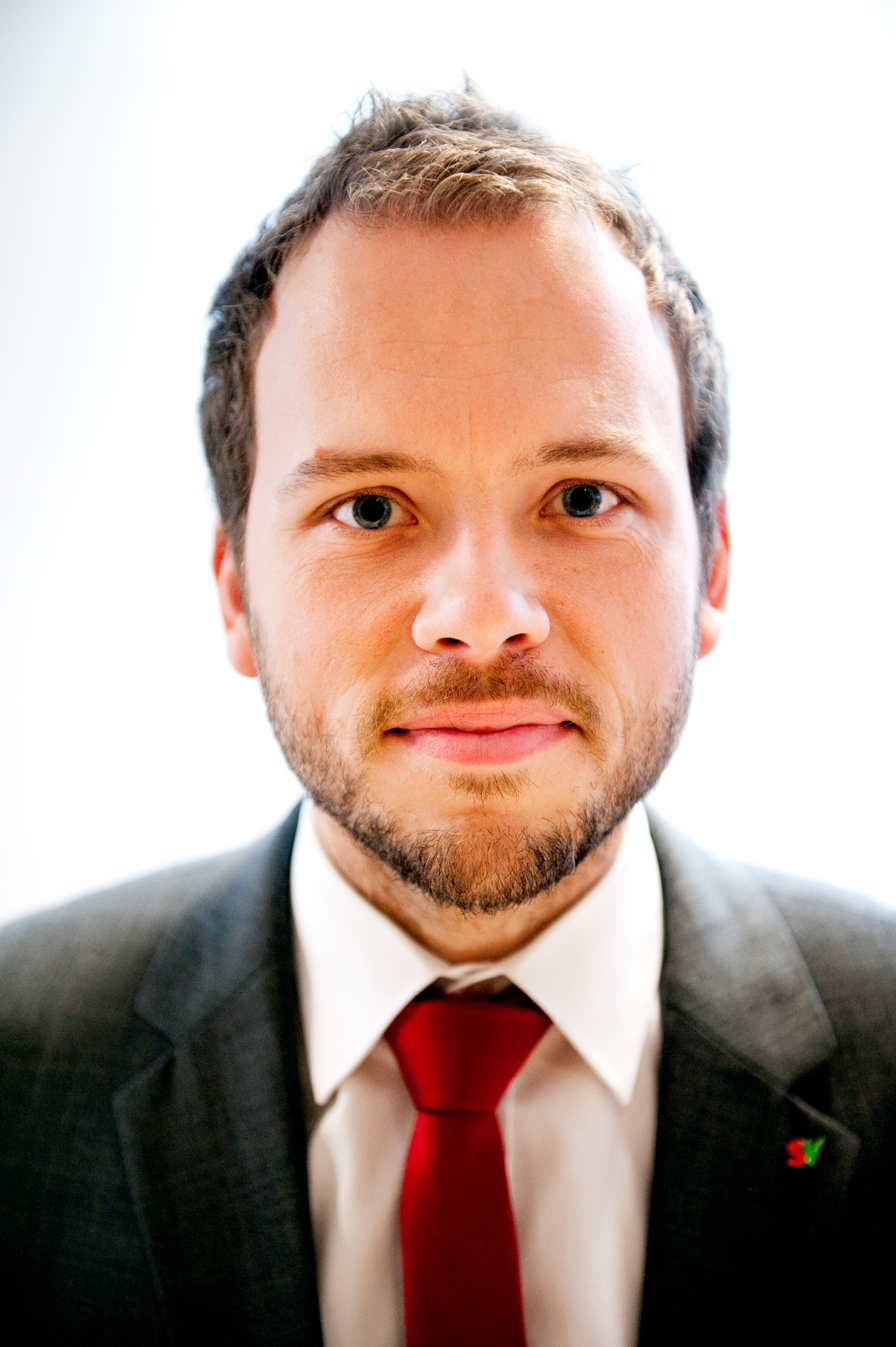

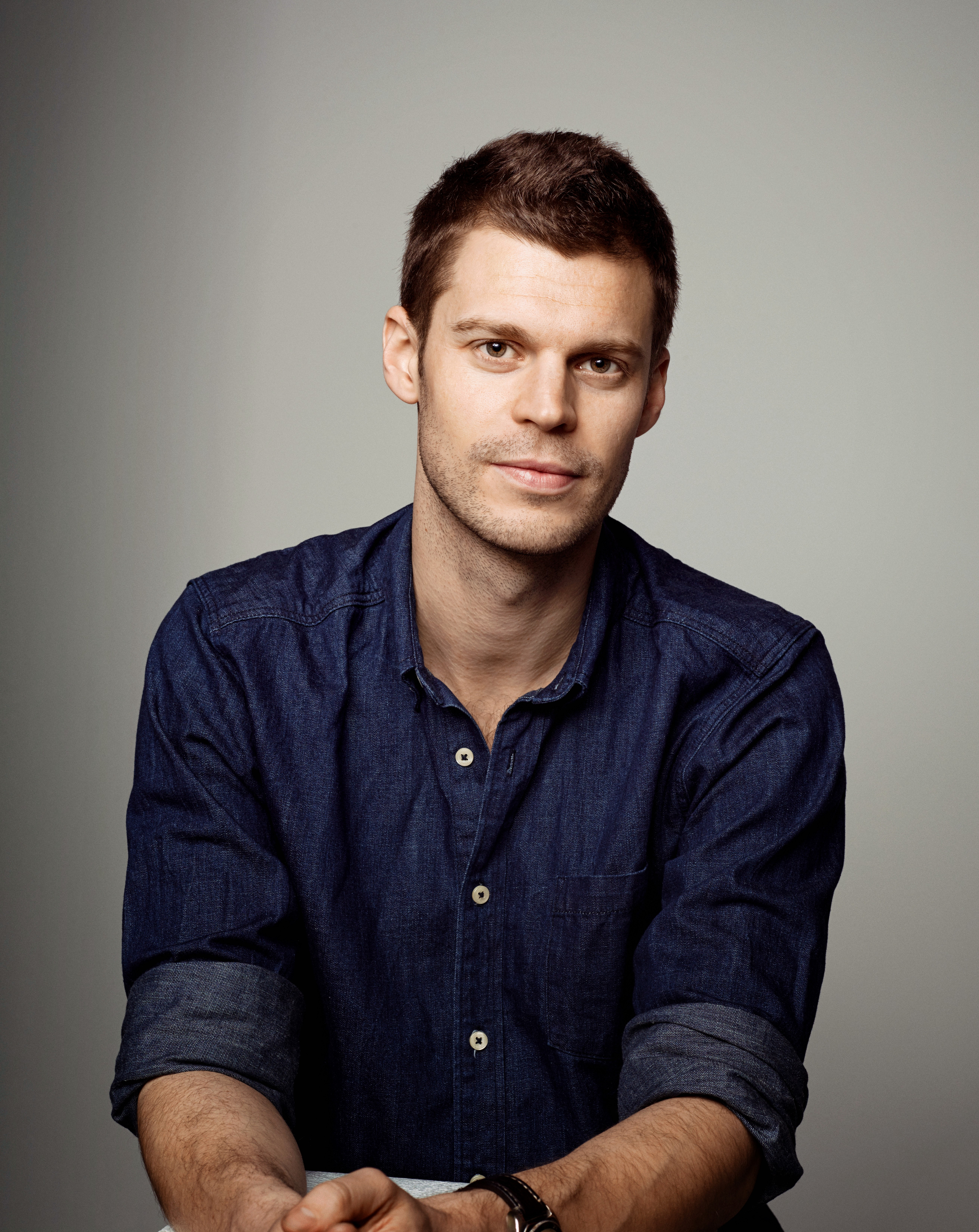
Party	Labour	Conservative	Progress
Popular vote	785,799	552,334	225,438
Percentage	33%	23.2%	9.5%
Party	Centre	Liberal	Christian Democratic
Popular vote	202,238	131,078	129,551
Percentage	8.5%	5.5%	5.4%
Party	Green	Socialist Left	Red
Popular vote	100,955	97,933	46,689
Percentage	4.2%	4.1%	2.0%

Local elections were held in Norway on 14 September 2015. Voters elected representatives to municipal and county councils, which are responsible for education, public transport, health, and elderly care, and for the levy of certain taxes. The Labour Party became the largest party, gaining 33% of the vote, while the nationally governing Conservative and Progress parties suffered losses relative to their performances in the 2013 parliamentary and 2011 local elections.

Term of office was 1 January 2016 until 31 December 2019.

The results meant that the Conservatives were set to lose control of Norway's two most populous cities, Oslo and Bergen.

In Tromsø the Red Party garnered a record 14.4% of the votes. They formed a majority along with the Labour Party and the Socialist Left Party, and chose to phase out the local parliamentary system.

== Debates ==
2015 Norwegian local elections debates
Date	Time	Organisers	P Present I Invitee N Non-invitee								
Date	Time	Organisers	Ap	H	Frp	Sp	KrF	V	SV	MDG	Refs
6 August 2015	???	TV2	P Jonas Gahr Støre	P Erna Solberg	N Siv Jensen	N Trygve Slagsvold Vedum	N Knut Arild Hareide	N Trine Skei Grande	N Audun Lysbakken	N Rasmus Hansson	
???	???	TV2	P Jonas Gahr Støre	P Erna Solberg	P Siv Jensen	P Trygve Slagsvold Vedum	P Knut Arild Hareide	P Trine Skei Grande	P Audun Lysbakken	P Rasmus Hansson	

== Results ==
=== Municipal ===
← Summary of the 14 September 2015 municipal election results
Party	Vote			Seats	
Party	Votes	%	±pp	Won	+/−
Labour Party (Ap)	789,170	33.0	▲1.3	3,459	▲81
Conservative Party (H)	554,399	23.2	▼4.8	1,954	▼394
Progress Party (Frp)	226,640	9.5	▼1.9	890	▼253
Centre Party (Sp)	203,188	8.5	▲1.8	1,774	▲354
Liberal Party (V)	131,836	5.5	▼0.8	545	▼95
Christian Democratic Party (KrF)	130,268	5.4	▼0.1	623	▼30
Green Party (MDG)	101,612	4.2	▲3.3	231	▲213
Socialist Left Party (SV)	98,625	4.1	▲0.1	359	▼3
Red Party (R)	47,102	2.0	▲0.4	80	▲23
Pensioners' Party (Pp)	18,569	0.8	±0.0	44	▼6
Others	1,139	3.8	▲0.1	0	±0
Total	5,431,850	100.00	±0.0	300	±0
Votes cast / turnout	5,566,295	59.9	▼3.7		
Abstentions	4,274,230	40.1	▲3.7		
Source: VG

=== County councils ===
← Summary of the 14 September 2015 county council election results
Party	Vote			Seats	
Party	Votes	%	±pp	Won	+/−
Labour Party (Ap)	741,976	33.6	▲0.4	277	▲4
Conservative Party (H)	517,318	23.4	▼4.2	167	▼43
Progress Party (Frp)	226,986	10.3	▼1.5	83	▼13
Centre Party (Sp)	176,252	8.0	▲1.7	80	▲19
Christian Democratic Party (KrF)	123,075	5.6	▼0.2	46	▼1
Green Party (MDG)	111,168	5.0	▲3.7	36	▲34
Liberal Party (V)	109,556	5.0	▼0.7	39	▼7
Socialist Left Party (SV)	88,944	4.0	▼0.3	28	▼6
Red Party (R)	47,561	2.2	▲0.4	10	▲3
Pensioners' Party (Pp)	20,185	0.9	±0.0	3	±0
Others	1,139	2.0	▲0.6	0	±0
Total	5,431,850	100.00	±0.0	300	±0
Votes cast / turnout	5,566,295	55.8	▼3.4		
Abstentions	4,274,230	44.2	▲3.4		
Source: VG

== Endorsements ==
=== National daily newspapers ===
Newspaper	Party endorsed
Aftenposten	Conservative Party

== Donations ==
According to Statistisk sentralbyrå, a total of 50.02 million NOK in campaign contributions was raised by all political parties in 2015.

Party	Donations (NOK)
Labour Party	28,572,534
Conservative Party	11,195,928
Socialist Left Party	2,833,907
Progress Party	2,435,250
Centre Party	2,317,364
Liberal Party	1,399,438
Green Party	897,625
Red Party	341,309
Christian Democratic Party	34,000
