= 2023 Nobel Peace Prize =

Award

- Narges Mohammadi
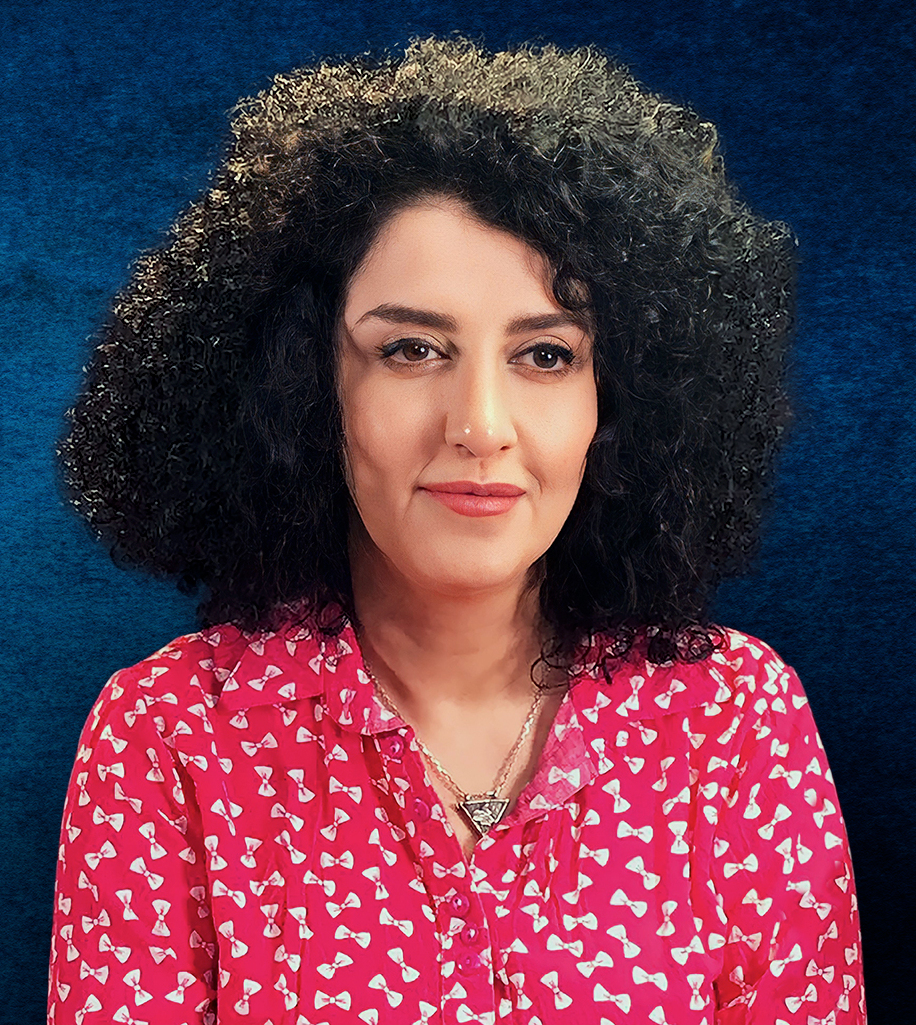
- "for her fight against the oppression of women in Iran and her fight to promote human rights and freedom for all."
- Date: 6 October 2023 (announcement); 10 December 2023 (ceremony)
- Location: Oslo, Norway
- Presented by: Norwegian Nobel Committee
- Reward: 11.0 million SEK
- First award: 1901
- Website: Official website

The 2023 Nobel Peace Prize was awarded to the Iranian activist Narges Mohammadi (born 1972) "for her fight against the oppression of women in Iran and her fight to promote human rights and freedom for all." She is the second Nobel Peace Prize laureate from Iran, following Shirin Ebadi, who won in 2003. As of the announcement of the prize in October 2023, Mohammadi was still imprisoned in Iran.

== Laureate ==
In the 1990s, as a young physics student, Mohammadi was already distinguishing herself as an advocate for equality and women's rights. After her studies, she worked as an engineer as well as a columnist in various reform-minded newspapers. In 2003, she became involved with the Defenders of Human Rights Center in Tehran, which was founded by her fellow Nobel Peace Prize laureate, Shirin Ebadi.

In 2011, Mohammadi was arrested for the first time, and was sentenced to many years of imprisonment for her efforts to assist incarcerated activists and their families. Two years later, after her release on bail, she immersed herself in a campaign against use of the death penalty. Her activism against the death penalty led to her re-arrest in 2015, and to a sentence of additional years behind bars. After her return to prison, she began opposing the Iranian regime's systematic use of torture and sexualized violence against political prisoners, especially women, which is commonly practiced in Iranian prisons.

In 2022, when the Mahsa Amini protests became known to the political prisoners being held inside the notorious Evin Prison in Tehran, Mohammadi once again assumed leadership. From prison she expressed support for the demonstrators, and organized solidarity actions among her fellow inmates. The prison authorities responded by imposing even stricter conditions, and she was prohibited from receiving phone calls and visitors. From captivity, Mohammadi helped to ensure that the protests did not subside.

== Candidates ==
On February 22, the Norwegian Nobel Committee announced that they had received 305 nominations for the 2023 Nobel Peace Prize, of which 212 are individuals and 93 are organizations. The number this year was fewer than the 343 candidates last year and the lowest since 2019. The highest number of candidates yet was in 2016. Though nominations are kept strictly secret, several Norwegian parliamentarians and other academics are privileged to publicly announce their preferred candidates to boost publicity both for the nominee and the nominator.

Nominations confirmed by news agencies
Nominee	Country/ Headquarters	Motivations	Nominator(s)	Source
Individuals
Masih Alinejad (b. 1976)	Iran; United States	"for her ongoing efforts to fight for freedom of expression, democracy and women's rights in Iran"	Abid Raja (b. 1975)	
Julian Assange (b. 1971)	Australia	"for his dauntless fight for transparency and accountability, exposing governments' illegal actions and deceptions in the pursuit for peace"	Marcello Ferrada de Noli (b. 1943)	
Muhammadu Buhari (Note: Nominated together with the Nigerian Security Chiefs:Chief of Defence Staff, Gen. Lucky Irabor (b. 1965); Chief of Army Staff, Lt. Gen. Faruk Yahaya (b. 1966); Chief of Naval Staff, Vice Admiral Awwal Zubairu Gambo (b. 1966); Chief of Air Staff, Air Marshal Isiaka Oladayo Amao (b. 1965) and Inspector-General of Police, Usman Alkali Baba (b. 1963)) (b. 1942-2025	Nigeria	"for their efforts in peace, security, and human rights, and for averting civil war on the African continent"	Centre for Social Justice, Equity And Transparency (CESJET)	
Chow Hang-tung (b. 1985)	Hong Kong	"for her dedicated work as a human rights lawyer, standing up to attempts to silence dissent in Hong Kong"	Guri Melby (b. 1981)	
Pavel Chuprunov (b. 1993)	Russia	"[with Vesna] for standing up against war of aggression contrary to international law by defying Putin's regime of repression and censorship"	Bjørnar Moxnes (b. 1981)	
Recep Tayyip Erdoğan (b. 1954)	Turkey	"for his role and efforts before and during Russo-Ukrainian War"	Sadiq Sanjrani (b. 1978)	
Maggie Gobran (b. 1949)	Egypt	"for her locally rooted aid work that builds human dignity, peace and reconciliation in a crucial time for the entire Middle East region"	Dag Inge Ulstein (b. 1980)	
Vladimir Kara-Murza (b. 1981)	Russia	"for having criticized the war in Ukraine, uncovering Russian corruption and authoritarian oppression"	Ingjerd Schou (b. 1955)	
Narges Mohammadi (b. 1972)	Iran	"in representation to hundreds of thousands of brave Iranians, women and men, who are willing to risk everything to bring peace and freedom back in Iran"	Rasmus Hansson (b. 1954)	
Vanessa Nakate (b. 1996)	Uganda	"for their collaborative work against climate change and for climate action"	Lan Marie Berg (b. 1987)	
Greta Thunberg (b. 2003)	Sweden	"for their collaborative work against climate change and for climate action"	Lan Marie Berg (b. 1987)	
Mary John Mananzan, O.S.B. (b. 1937)	Philippines	"for her non-violent efforts to involve the Church in bringing social revolution in the Philippines."	Knut Arild Hareide (b. 1972)	
Alexei Navalny (1976–2024)	Russia	"for his courageous opposition to the authoritarian regime in Russia despite imprisonment"	Hårek Elvenes (b. 1959)	
Jafar Panahi (b. 1960)	Iran	"for his efforts to convey the societal challenges that affect the lives of ordinary Iranians in their everyday lives."	Mahmoud Farahmand (b. 1979)	
Peng Lifa (b. 1974)	China	"for his outstanding courage when demonstrating for freedom and democracy at Sitong Bridge, Beijing in October 2022"	Ola Elvestuen (b. 1967)	
Alex Saab (b. 1971)	Colombia; Venezuela	"for his fight to maintain social peace and for having contributed to the acquisition of food and medicine for Venezuela, despite being prohibited by U.S. sanctions."	Tunisian Human Rights League	
Ryan Saadi (Note: Saadi was nominated together with Tevogen Bio, the company he founded.) (b. 1964)	United States	"[with Tevogen Bio] for their works towards alleviating health inequality"	Curtis Patton (b. 1935)	
Jani Silva (b. 1968)	Colombia	"for her dedication in protecting the Amazon and social work in the Putumayo community."	Kristoffer Robin Haug (b. 1984); Grunde Almeland (b. 1991)	
Jens Stoltenberg (b. 1959)	Norway	"for his outstanding work as NATO's secretary general in a demanding time for the alliance"	Christian Tybring-Gjedde (b. 1963)	
Kyaw Moe Tun (b. 1969)	Myanmar	"[with NUCC] in recognition for the civil and democratic forces of resistance and opposition in Myanmar"	Ingrid Fiskaa (b. 1977)	
Joshua Wong (Note: Joshua Wong and Cardinal Zen were nominated together with a number of Hong Kong activists and prisoners of conscience including Jimmy Lai (b. 1947), Chow Hang-tung (b. 1985), Gwyneth Ho (b. 1990), Lee Cheuk-yan (b. 1957), Denise Ho (b. 1977), Margaret Ng (b. 1948), Albert Ho (b. 1951), Nathan Law (b. 1993) and Agnes Chow (b. 1996)) (b. 1996)	Hong Kong	"in honor of all those in Hong Kong whose bravery and determination in the face of repression for peaceful expression of political opinion"	Marco Rubio (b. 1971) et al. (Note: American Senator Marco Rubio of Florida nominated together with Representative Christopher Smith (b. 1953) of New Jersey, Senator Jeff Merkley (b. 1956) of Oregon, and Representative Jim McGovern of Massachusetts.); Geremie Barmé (b. 1954) et al. (Note: Together with Geremie Barmé were Ako Tomoko (b. 1971), Jean-Philippe Béja (b. 1949), Cai Xia (b. 1952), Anita Chan (?), Joseph Cheng (b. 1949), Josephine Chiu-Duke (b. 1951), Jerome A. Cohen (b. 1930), Larry Diamond (b. 1951), Christopher R. Hughes (b. 1940), Jin Xuefei (b. 1956), Perry Link (b. 1944), Andrew J. Nathan (b. 1943), Heiner Roetz (b. 1950), and Vera Schwarcz (b. 1947).)	
Joseph Zen, S.D.B. (b. 1932)	Hong Kong	"in honor of all those in Hong Kong whose bravery and determination in the face of repression for peaceful expression of political opinion"	Marco Rubio (b. 1971) et al.; Geremie Barmé (b. 1954) et al.	
Organizations
Bloody Sunday families	United Kingdom	"for their commitment to peace and reconciliation during their long fight for truth and justice"	Colum Eastwood (b. 1983)	
Florida Rights Restoration Coalition (FRRC) (founded in 2019)	United States	"for their work in building democracies, supporting the human right to representation by government, and working towards a better organized and peaceful world."	American Friends Service Committee; Quaker Peace and Social Witness	
National Council of Churches of Kenya (NCCK) (founded in 1913)	Kenya	"for their work in building democracies, supporting the human right to representation by government, and working towards a better organized and peaceful world."	American Friends Service Committee; Quaker Peace and Social Witness	
European Court of Human Rights (ECHR) (established in 1959)	France	"for their important function in defending democratic principles and controlling the exercise of government in the process of peace and reconciliation between nations"	Even Eriksen (b. 1995)	
International Criminal Court (ICC) (founded in 1998)	Netherlands	"for their important function in defending democratic principles and controlling the exercise of government in the process of peace and reconciliation between nations"	Even Eriksen (b. 1995)	
International Association of Collaborative Professionals (IACP) (founded in 1999)	United States	"for their efforts in transforming the way families resolve conflict around the world by offering an alternative to litigation, a conflict resolution model called Collaborative Practice, or Collaborative Divorce"		
Great Orchestra of Christmas Charity (GOCC/WOŚP) (founded in 1993)	Poland	"for mobilizing all generations of Poles in a country divided and torn over politics."	37 Polish senators	
JA Worldwide (founded in 1919)	United States	"in recognition of works in areas of political instability, violence and war, and helping young people build their entrepreneurial skills and economic resilience."		
National Unity Consultative Council (NUCC) (founded in 2021)	Myanmar	"[with Tun] in recognition for the civil and democratic forces of resistance and opposition in Myanmar"	Ingrid Fiskaa (b. 1977)	
Organized Crime and Corruption Reporting Project (OCCRP) (founded in 2006)	Netherlands	"for their work against corruption and organized crime by exposing shadow economies and fight misinformation through investigative journalism"	Wolfgang Wagner (b. 1970)	
Still I Rise (founded in 2018)	Italy	"for providing free education and protection to vulnerable and refugee children."	Sara Conti (b. 1979); Giuseppe Maria Morganti (born 1955)	
The Salvation Army (founded in 1865)	United Kingdom	"for their efforts in rendering emergency aid quickly and promoting long-term measures to build society"	Olaug Bollestad (b. 1961)	
Vesna (founded in 2013)	Russia	"[with Chuprunov] for standing up against war of aggression contrary to international law by defying Putin's regime of repression and censorship"	Bjørnar Moxnes (b. 1981)	
World Uyghur Congress (founded in 2005)	Germany	"for its work toward peace, democracy and the plight of the Uyghur and other Turkic people who live under a repressive regime in China."	Alexis Brunelle-Duceppe (b. 1979) et al.; Ane Breivik (b. 1998)	

== Prize committee ==
The following members of the Norwegian Nobel Committee are responsible for the selection of the Nobel laureate(s) in accordance with the will of Alfred Nobel:

- Berit Reiss-Andersen (chair, born 1954), advocate (barrister) and former President of the Norwegian Bar Association, former state secretary for the Minister of Justice and the Police (representing the Labour Party). Member of the Norwegian Nobel Committee since 2012, reappointed for the period 2018–2023.
- Asle Toje (vice chair, born 1974), foreign policy scholar. Appointed for the period 2018–2023.
- Anne Enger (born 1949), former Leader of the Centre Party and Minister of Culture. Member since 2018, reappointed for the period 2021–2026.
- Kristin Clemet (born 1957), former Minister of Government Administration and Labour and Minister of Education and Research. Appointed for the period 2021–2026.
- Jørgen Watne Frydnes (born 1984), former board member of Médecins Sans Frontières Norway, board member of the Norwegian Helsinki Committee. Appointed for the period 2021–2026.
