= Une Bastholm =

Norwegian Green Party Leader

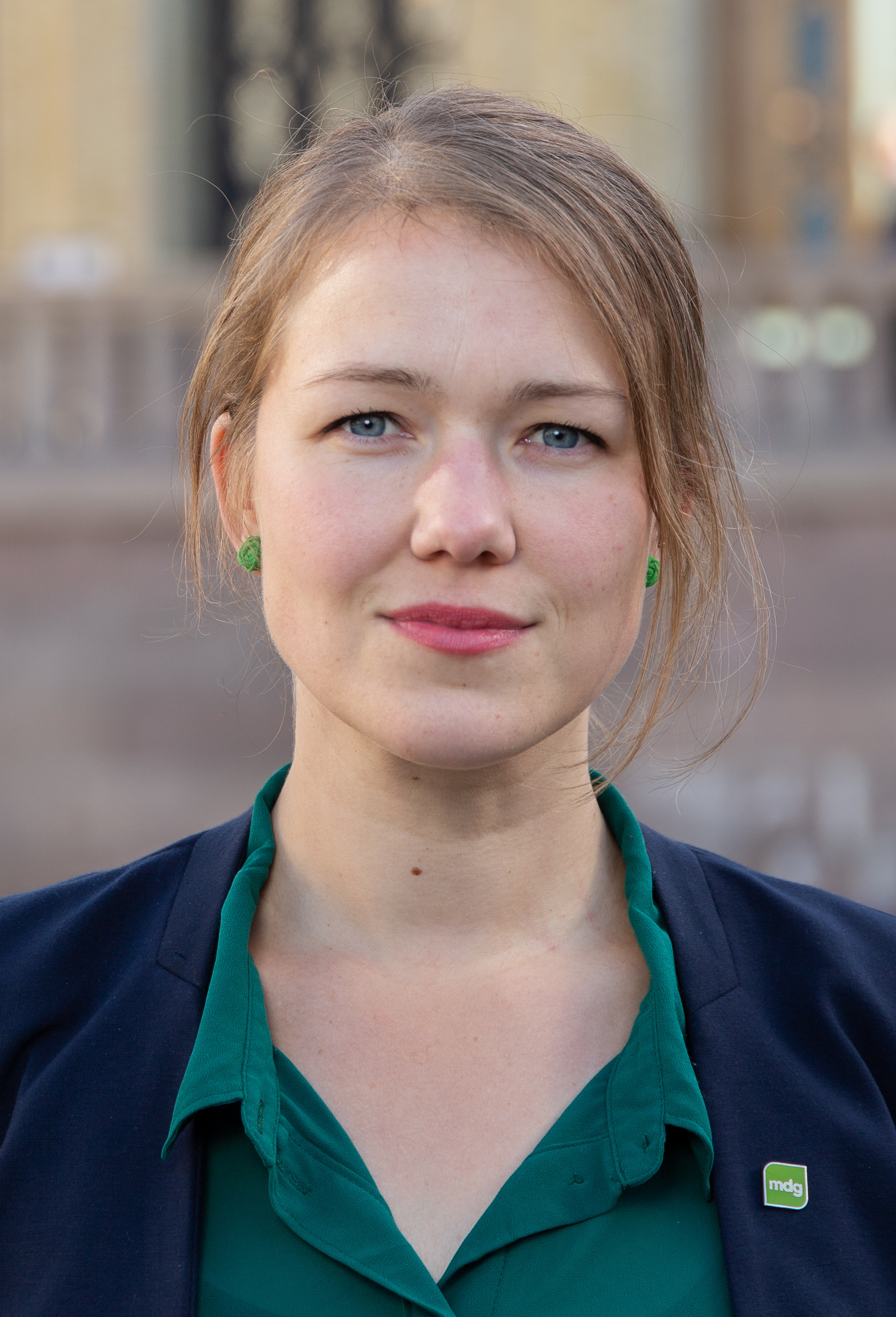
- Bastholm in 2018

Leader of the Green Party
- In office 25 April 2020 – 22 August 2022
- First Deputy: Arild Hermstad
- Second Deputy: Kriss Rokkan Iversen; Ingrid Liland
- Preceded by: Herself (as party spokesperson)
- Succeeded by: Arild Hermstad

Spokesperson for the Green Party
- In office 9 April 2016 – 25 April 2020 Serving with Rasmus Hansson (2016–2018); Arild Hermstad (2018–2020)
- Preceded by: Hilde Opoku
- Succeeded by: Herself (as party leader)

Member of the Norwegian Parliament
- Incumbent
- Assumed office 1 October 2021
- Deputy: Kristoffer Robin Haug
- Constituency: Akershus
- In office 1 October 2017 – 30 September 2021
- Constituency: Oslo

Personal details
- Born: Une Aina Bastholm; 14 January 1986 (age 40) Trondheim, Sør-Trøndelag, Norway
- Party: Green Party
- Spouse: Peter Ringstad
- Children: 2
- Occupation: Politician

Une Aina Bastholm (born 14 January 1986) is a Norwegian politician and former leader of Green Party. She represented Oslo in the Storting from 2017 to 2021 and during this time was the only member of her party with a parliamentary seat. She was elected to represent Akershus following the 2021 election.

== Early life ==
Une Aina Bastholm was born on 14 January 1986 in Trondheim, Norway. When she was 10 years old, her family moved north to Bodø, where she attended school a short distance away in Mørkved.

She started getting involved with politics at the age of 14 through youth groups such as Press and AUF (Workers' Youth League). She studied political science at the University of Oslo and the University of Potsdam before completing a master's degree in international politics at Aberystwyth University in Wales.

== Political career ==
Returning to Trondheim after her graduation in 2010, Bastholm worked for groups such as Framtiden i våre hender (The Future in our hands), Dyrevernalliansen (The Norwegian Animal Protection Alliance), and Naturvernforbundet (Friends of the Earth Norway). She also helped her mum and sister open a sustainable, non-profit, family-run grocery store named Etikken.

=== The Green Party ===
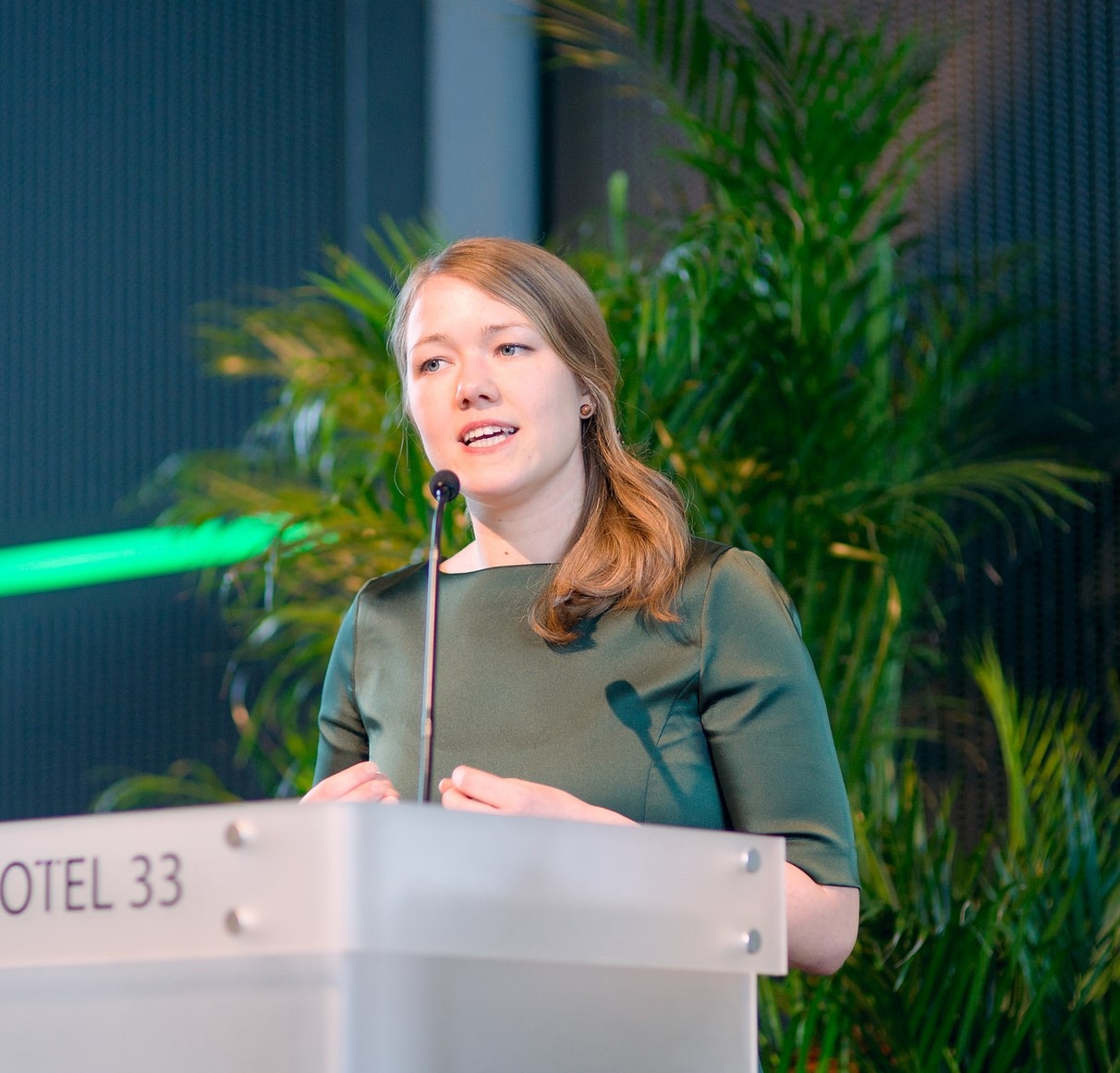
Bastholm at a Green Party conference in 2016

While briefly experimenting with Arbeiderpartiet (Norway's Labour Party) in her youth, Bastholm had not felt at home in the party. She had studied green politics as part of her master's thesis and soon became drawn to the green party in Norway, Miljøpartiet De Grønne (MDG). Bastholm joined in 2010, becoming a member of their central board in 2012, before moving to Oslo and becoming MDG's local leader for the county. In 2013, she became a deputy representative at Stortinget where she worked under MDG's only member of parliament at the time, Rasmus Hansson.

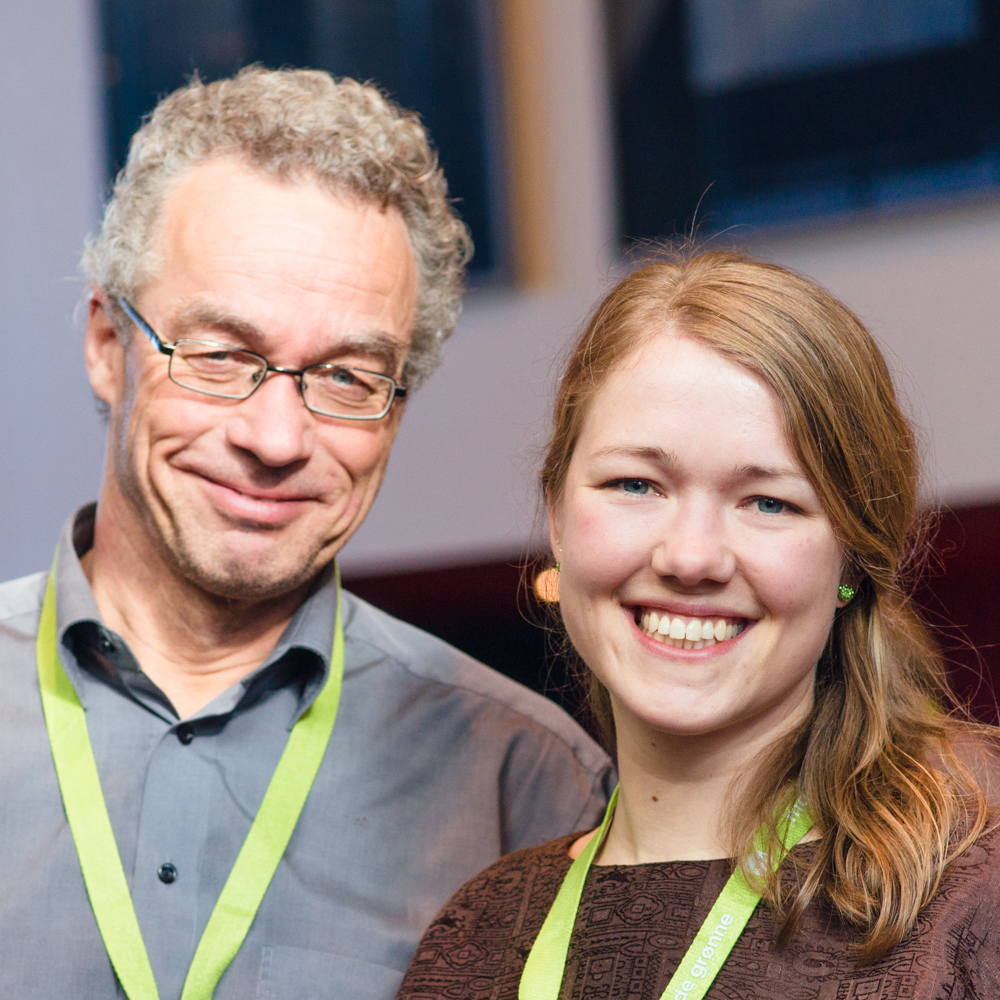
Bastholm with Rasmus Hansson in 2016

==== Party spokesperson ====
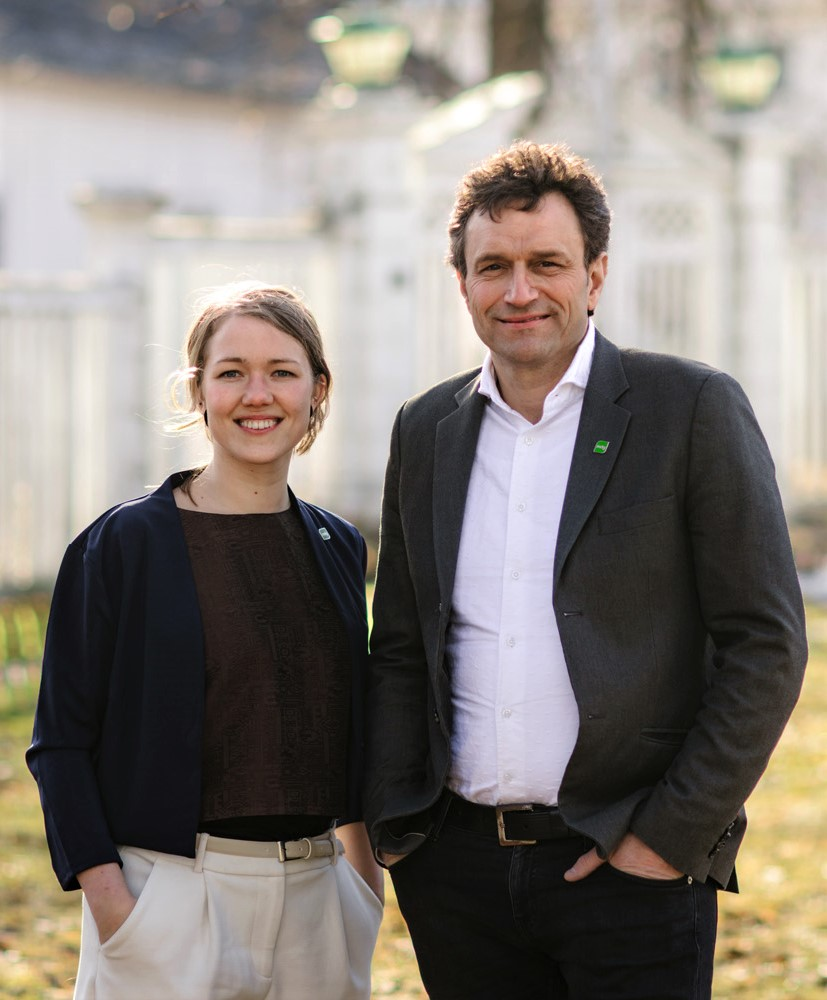
Bastholm with Arild Hermstad, her fellow Green Party spokesperson from 2018 to 2020

In April 2016, Bastholm went up against Hilde Lengali in a challenge to become one of MDG's two spokespeople (one man, one woman). Bastholm was a clear favourite with the backing of the entire nomination committee – Hansson (who would become the male spokesperson) threatened to resign if she was not elected. Bastholm received 142 against 48 votes at a party meeting in Økern and went on to serve in the spokesperson role alongside Hansson until 2018, when his role was taken over by Arild Hermstad.

==== 2017: parliamentary election and seat in parliament ====
In the 2017 Norwegian parliamentary election, MDG received 3.2% of the vote and Bastholm became representative nr.11 (out of 19) for Oslo district. As Hansson lost his seat, this made her the new sole representative belonging to MDG in Stortinget. During this period, she sat on government committees for finance, energy/climate, and foreign affairs/defence.

==== 2019: leadership of party ====
Following a national conference in 2019, the Green Party decided to elect a single leader, abolishing their tradition of having multiple spokespeople. During a meeting in April 2020 (held digitally due to the COVID-19 pandemic), Bastholm was elected as the party's first leader.

==== 2021: parliamentary election ====
In the 2021 Norwegian parliamentary election, MDG's share of the vote increased by 0.6% to a total of 3.8% and Bastholm won a seat to represent Akershus district. The party also gained an additional two seats in Oslo district for Rasmus Hansson and Lan Marie Berg, bringing the total number of MDG seats to three.

==== 2022: step down ====
Bastholm was re-elected at the 2022 party congress on 8 May. Arild Hermstad continued as deputy leader, and Ingrid Liland became the new additional deputy.

On 17 August 2022, the Green Party committee announced that it would be calling for an extraordinary meeting after Bastholm indicated that she would be stepping down as leader, citing family reasons and occupational burnout. Deputy Leader Arild Hermstad succeeded her as acting leader until an extraordinary congress can be held during autumn.

== Political views ==
In 2016, in response to a question about whether it was appropriate for Green Party members to travel by air given the party's environmental stance, Bastholm stated that it would be impossible for the party to engage with the more remote parts of Norway without using planes. She herself makes an effort to avoid flights when possible (once travelling for 19 hours via train and bus to reach a party conference in Narvik) but accepts that this is not a viable option for everyone, particularly for politicians in an elongated country like Norway. She pointed out that the Green Party are not against air travel completely, but rather aim to encourage people to fly less and halt the growth of air traffic.

In 2017, Bastholm announced that she was terminating her customer relationship with DNB after the release of the Panama Papers led to revelations about the bank having over 100 clients registered in Bermuda (a popular tax haven for corporations).

During the digital national party conference in April 2020, Bastholm referred to the climate crisis as the "headline of this century" and made an appeal to Norwegian oil workers, calling for them to use their expertise and experience in order to help build new renewable industries. She also called on Prime Minister Erna Solberg to offer oil companies a green restructuring package.

In December 2020, in response to the announcement of Norway's 2021 budget, Bastholm accused the government of spending billions like "drunk sailors." This comment was criticised by both the Norwegian Maritime Officers’ Association and Sylvi Listhaug of the Progress Party. Bastholm later issued an apology for the comment.

In a March 2021 interview, Bastholm stated her belief that the freedom of choice enjoyed by Norwegian consumers gives them a great ability to affect positive change in regards to climate change.

== Personal life ==
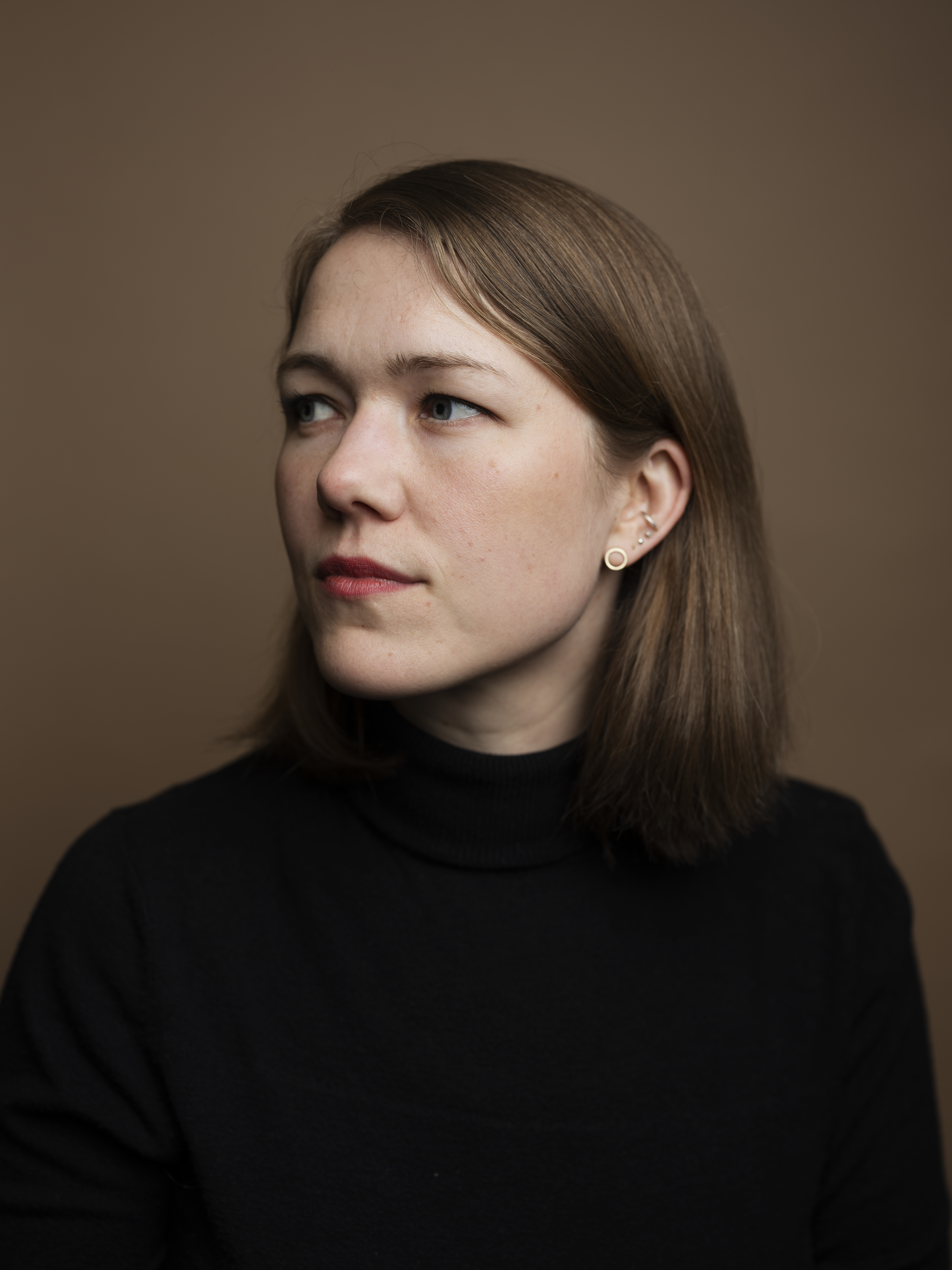
Bastholm in 2020

As a result of moving between Trøndelag and northern Norway as a child, Bastholm alternates between a Trøndersk and a northern dialect, using the former when she speaks to the media.

She has been a vegetarian since the age of 12.

In June 2017, Bastholm announced she was pregnant with her first child and that she would be taking maternity leave. In September 2020, she announced that she was expecting a second child and gave birth in April 2021 to a girl. Bastholm returned from maternity leave at the start of August 2021 in the run up to the 2021 Norwegian parliamentary election.

In September 2025, she revealed that she was in a relationship with former Oslo city commissioner and fellow party member Einar Wilhelmsen.

== See also ==
- Hanna Marcussen
- European Green Party
- Green Party (Sweden)
- Caroline Lucas
- Arne Næss
- Solberg's Cabinet
