= Arild Hermstad =

Norwegian politician (born 1966)

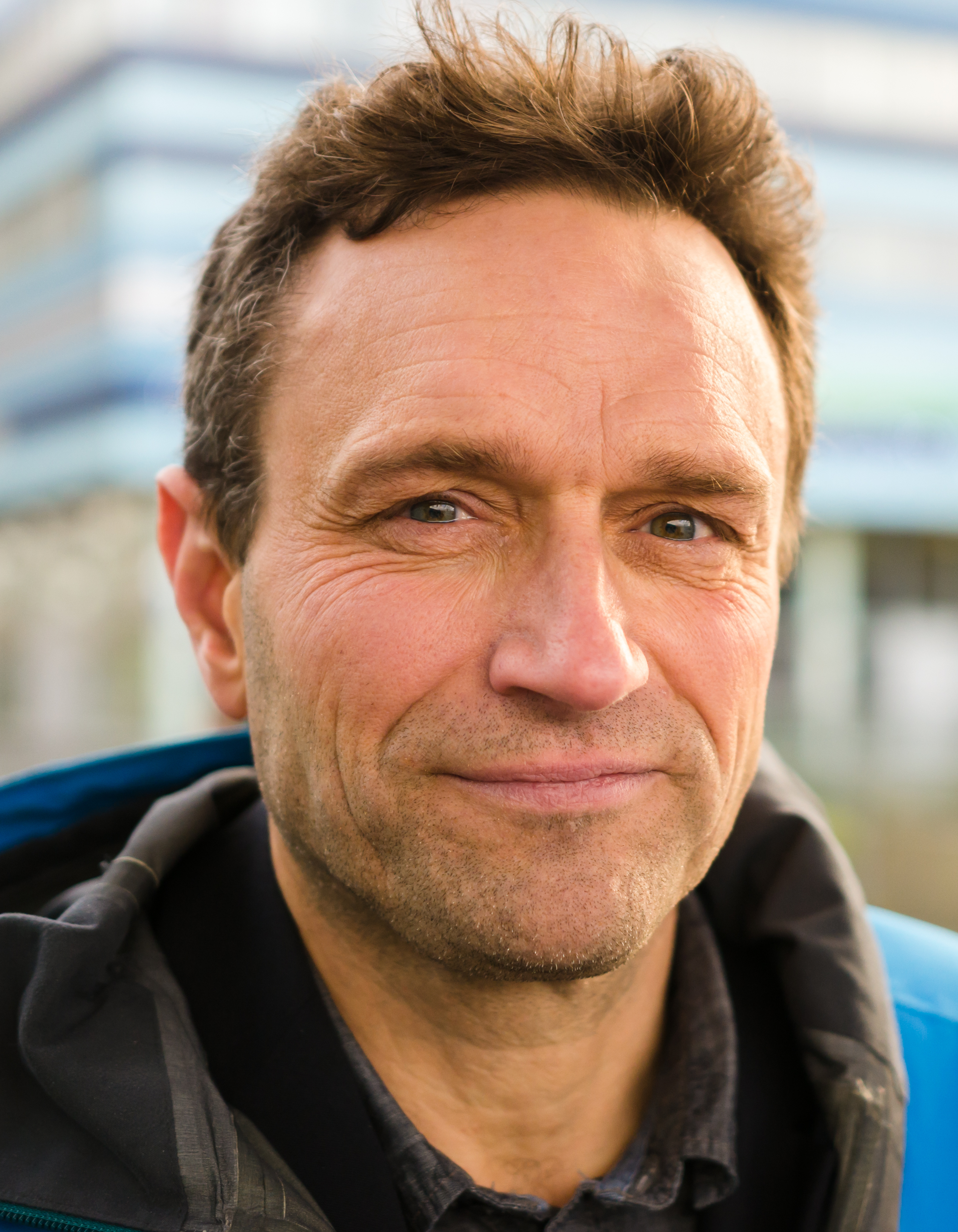
- Hermstad in 2018

Member of the Storting
- Incumbent
- Assumed office 1 October 2025
- Constituency: Oslo

Leader of the Green Party
- Incumbent
- Assumed office 26 November 2022; Acting: 22 August - 26 November 2022
- First Deputy: Lan Marie Berg; Ingrid Liland
- Second Deputy: Ingrid Liland; Jonas Maas Nilsen
- Preceded by: Une Bastholm

First Deputy Leader of the Green Party
- In office 25 April 2020 – 26 November 2022
- Leader: Une Bastholm; Himself (acting)
- Preceded by: Himself (as spokesperson)
- Succeeded by: Lan Marie Berg

Spokesperson for the Green Party
- In office 12 May 2018 – 25 April 2020 Serving with Une Bastholm
- Preceded by: Rasmus Hansson
- Succeeded by: Himself (as deputy leader)

Personal details
- Born: 16 October 1966 (age 60) Bergen, Hordaland, Norway
- Party: Green
- Children: 2
- Education: University of Bergen; Norwegian School of Economics

Arild Hermstad (born 15 October 1966) is a Norwegian politician for the Green Party, who has served as the party leader since 2022. He previously served as Party spokesperson, alongside Une Bastholm, from 2018 to 2020, and then the deputy leader from 2020 to 2022.

== Personal life and education ==
=== Education ===
Hermstad took his secondary education at Bergen Cathedral School in 1985. After studying economics for two years at the Norwegian School of Economics, Hermstad enrolled at the University of Bergen whence he graduated with a major in social geography in 1995.

=== Personal life ===
Hermstad is married and has two children.

== Career ==
Hermstad has previously worked in a bank, as a brigade coordinator in Latin America, with local environmental work in Bergen and has been employed by the Rafto Foundation.

He first became known nationwide as leader of Framtiden i våre hender from 2001 to 2017. He was also the leader of the Cyclists' National Association from 2013 to 2018.

He was the Green Party's candidate in Hordaland constituency for the 2017 and 2021 election, but failed to secure a seat on both occasions. He was the Green Party's first candidate in Oslo constituency for the 2025 election and he was elected to the Storting together with deputy leader Ingrid Liland and six others from the Green Party, as they managed to cross the 4% Electoral threshold for the first time in the Green Party's history.

On 12 May 2018, he was elected spokesperson for the Green Party, alongside incumbent Une Bastholm, succeeding Rasmus Hansson.

Following a national conference in 2019, the Green Party decided to elect a single leader, abolishing their tradition of having multiple spokespeople. During a meeting on 25 April 2020 (held digitally due to the COVID-19 pandemic), Hermstad became one of two deputy leaders, alongside Kriss Rokkan Iversen, with Bastholm as leader.

On 17 August 2022, Bastholm announced her resignation as party leader and the Green Party committee scheduled an extrondinary congress for the autumn. Shortly afterwards, Hermstad announced his leadership candidacy, while he in addition would become acting leader on 22 August until the autumn congress. He was designated leader on 10 October, with Lan Marie Berg as deputy leader. He was formally elected at the extraordinary congress on 26 November, winning 102 votes against Kristoffer Robin Haug's 101. He was re-elected at the 2024 party convention.

Between 2 March 2020 and 9 March 2021, he was acting Oslo City Commissioner for Transport and the Environment in addition to Urban Planning, in Lan Marie Berg's and Hanna Marcussen's absences. He again took over Marcussen's duties when she took maternal leave in May 2023.
