= 2017 Norwegian parliamentary election =

- 11 September 2017

All 169 seats in the Storting 85 seats are needed for a majority
- Registered: 3,765,245
- Turnout: 78.36% (▲0.04 pp)
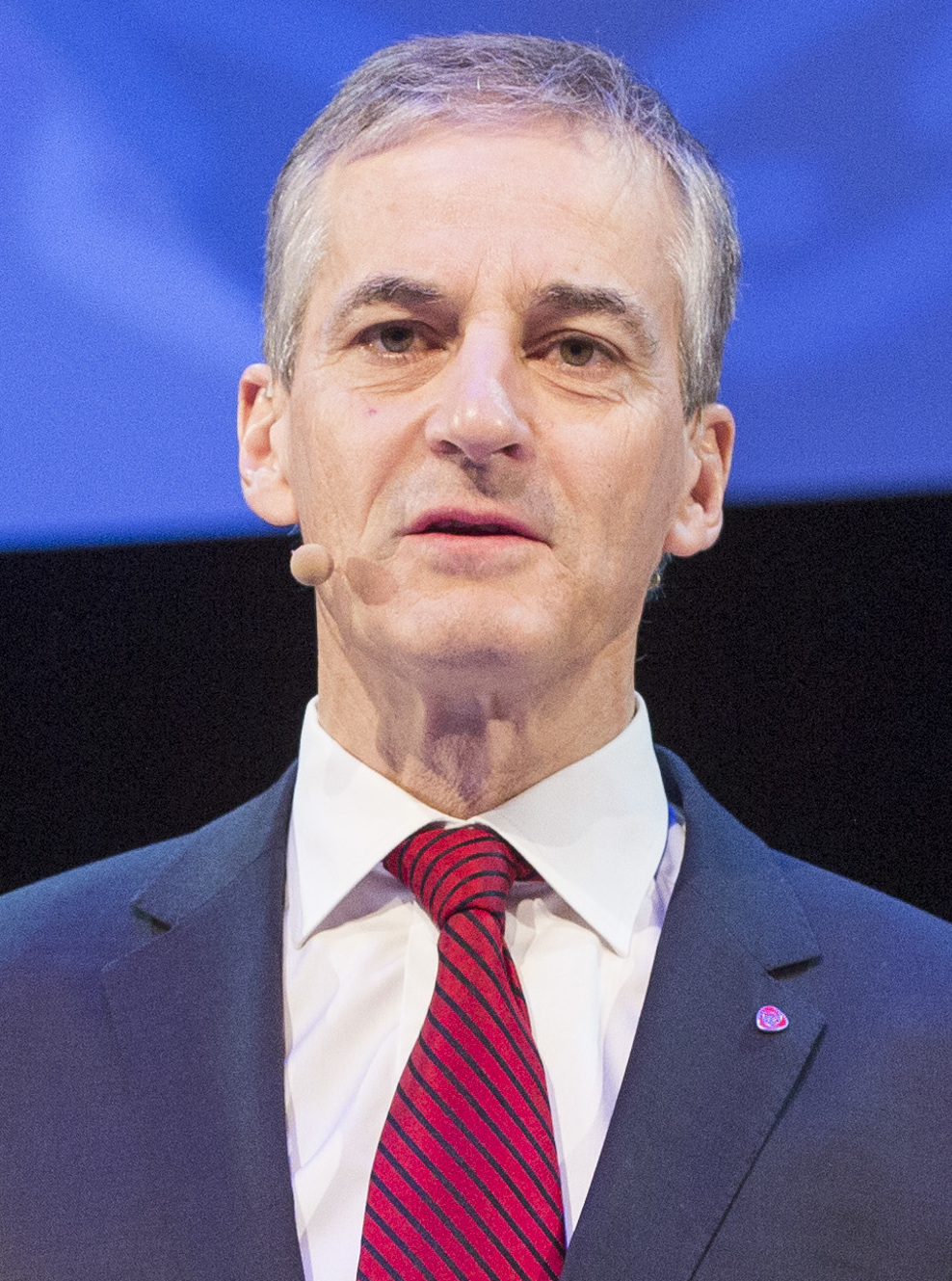

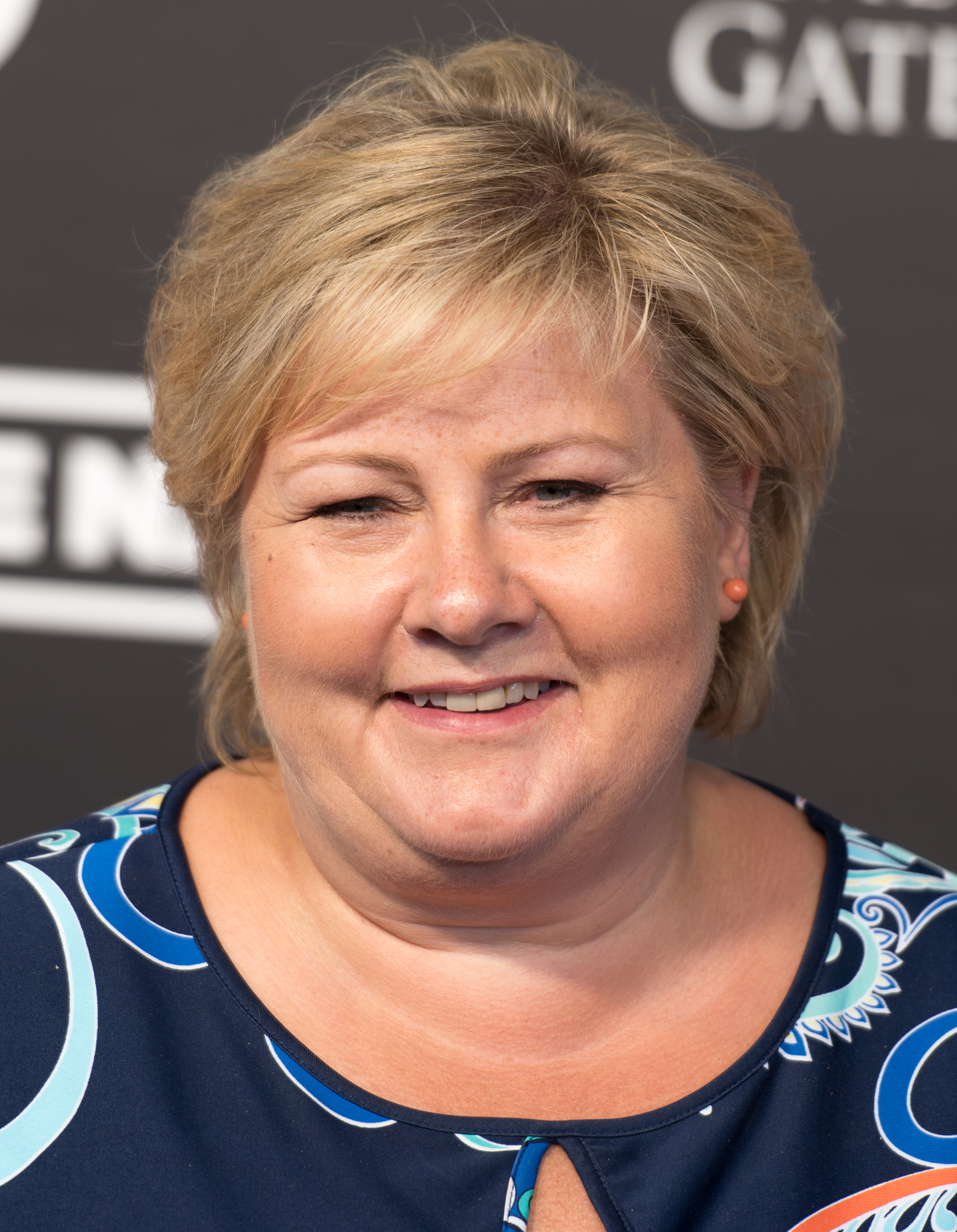

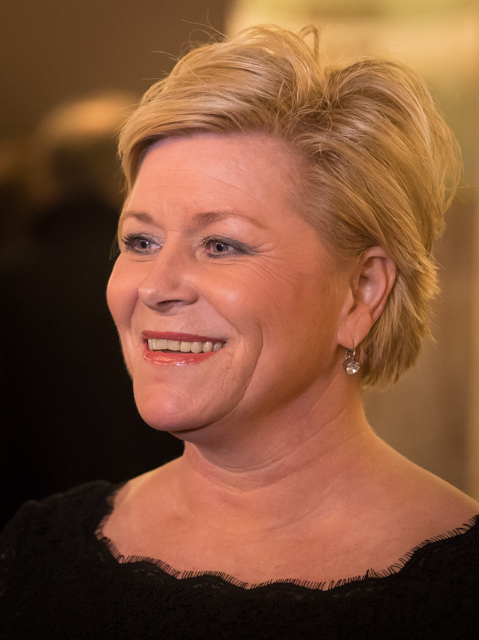

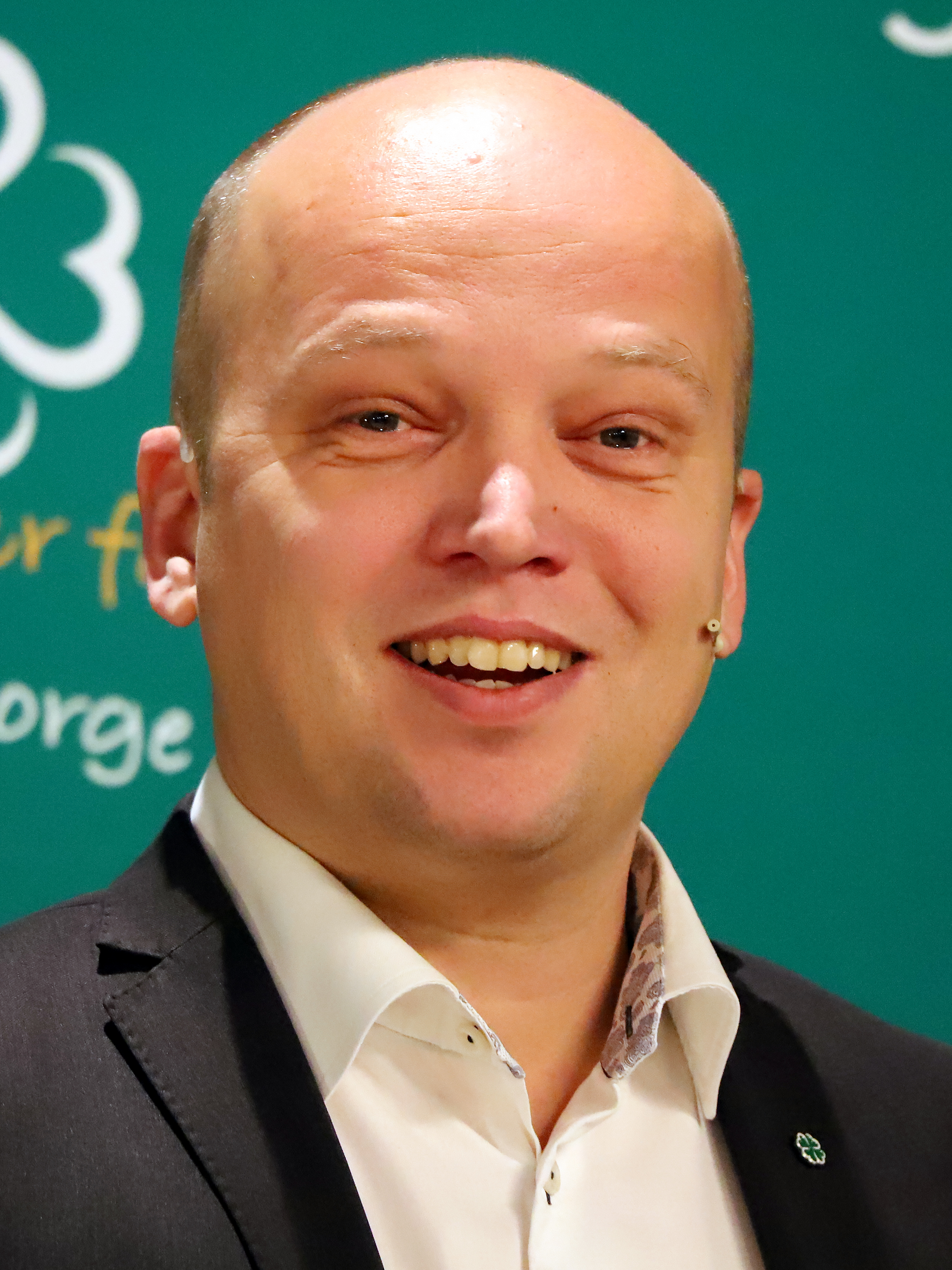

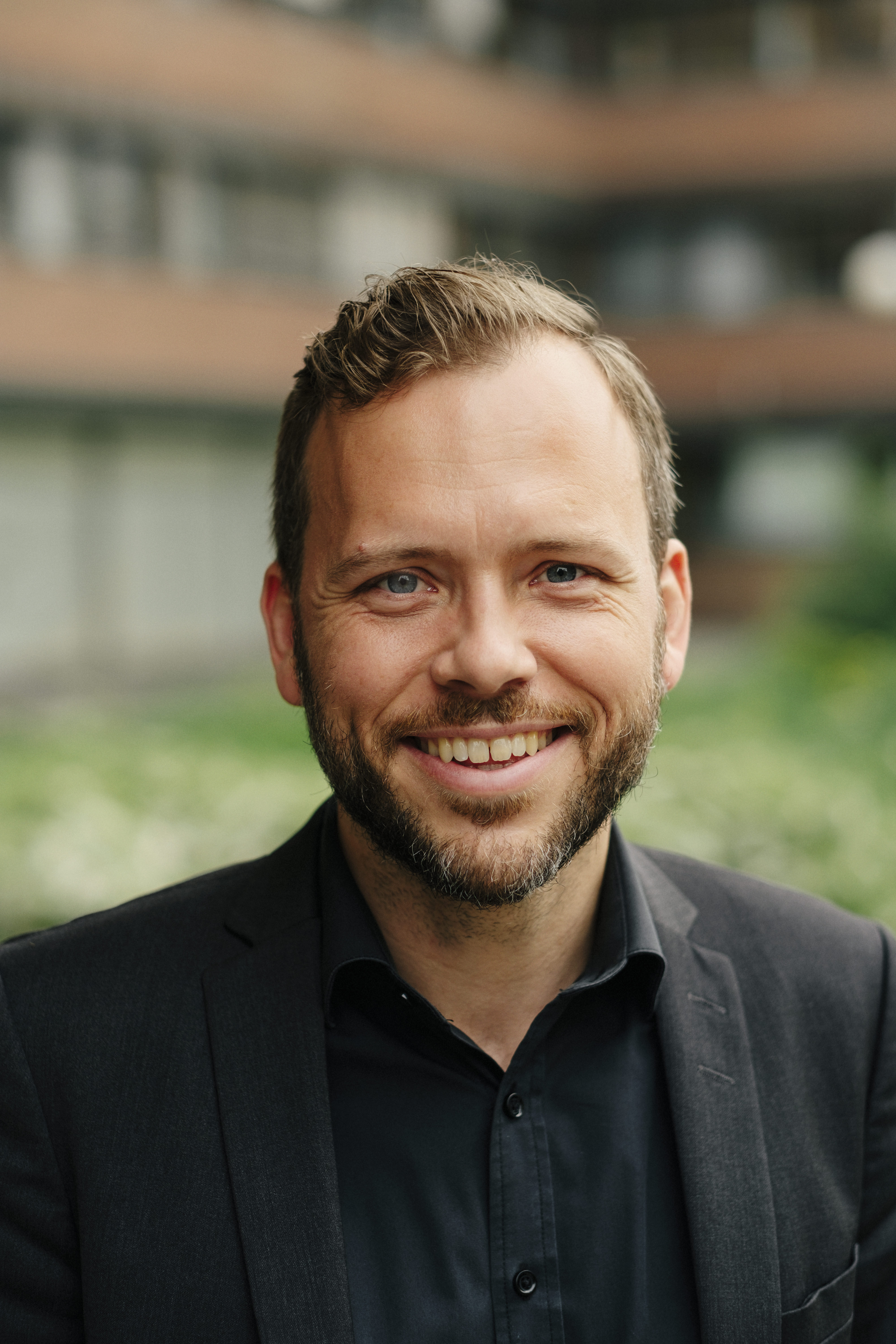

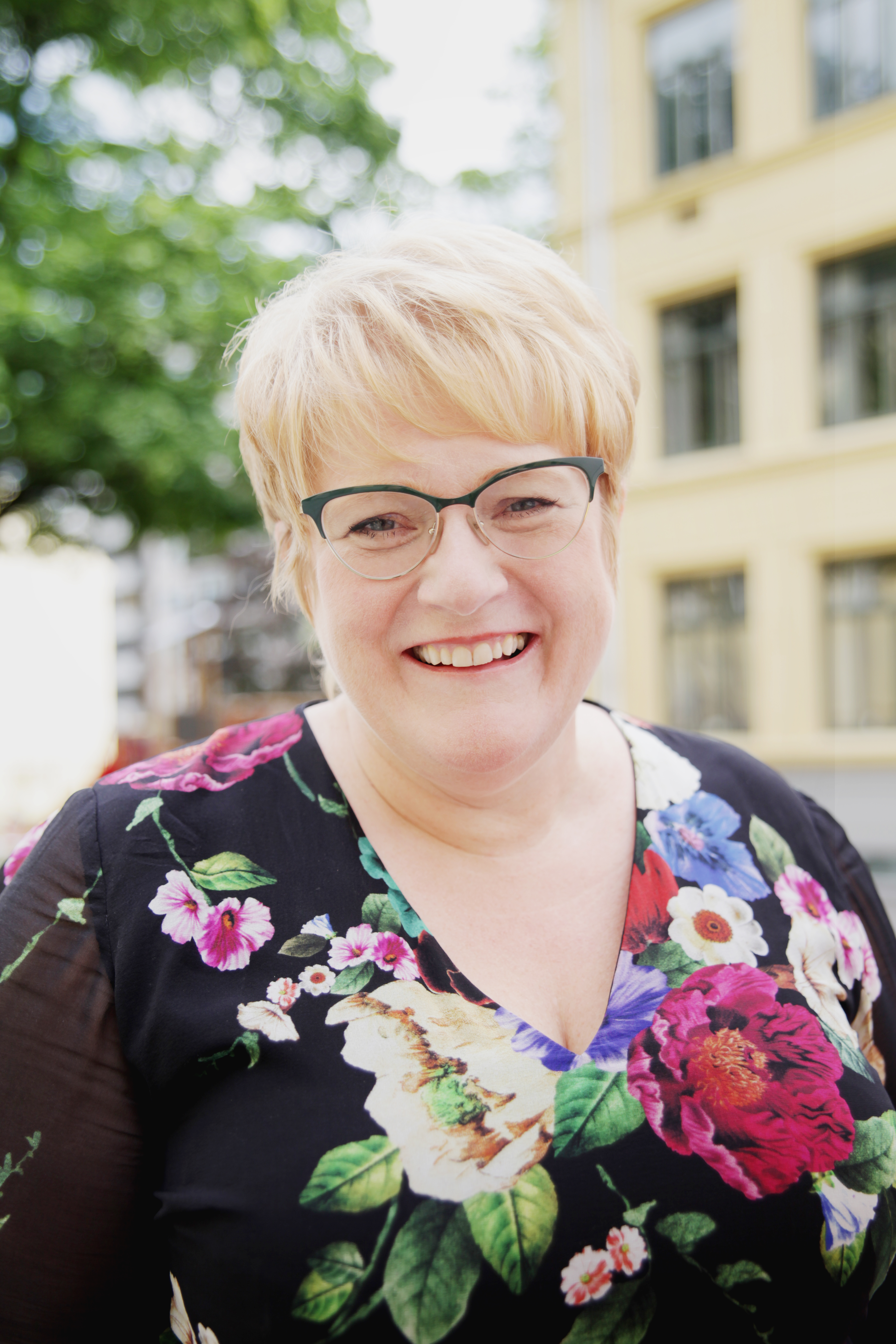

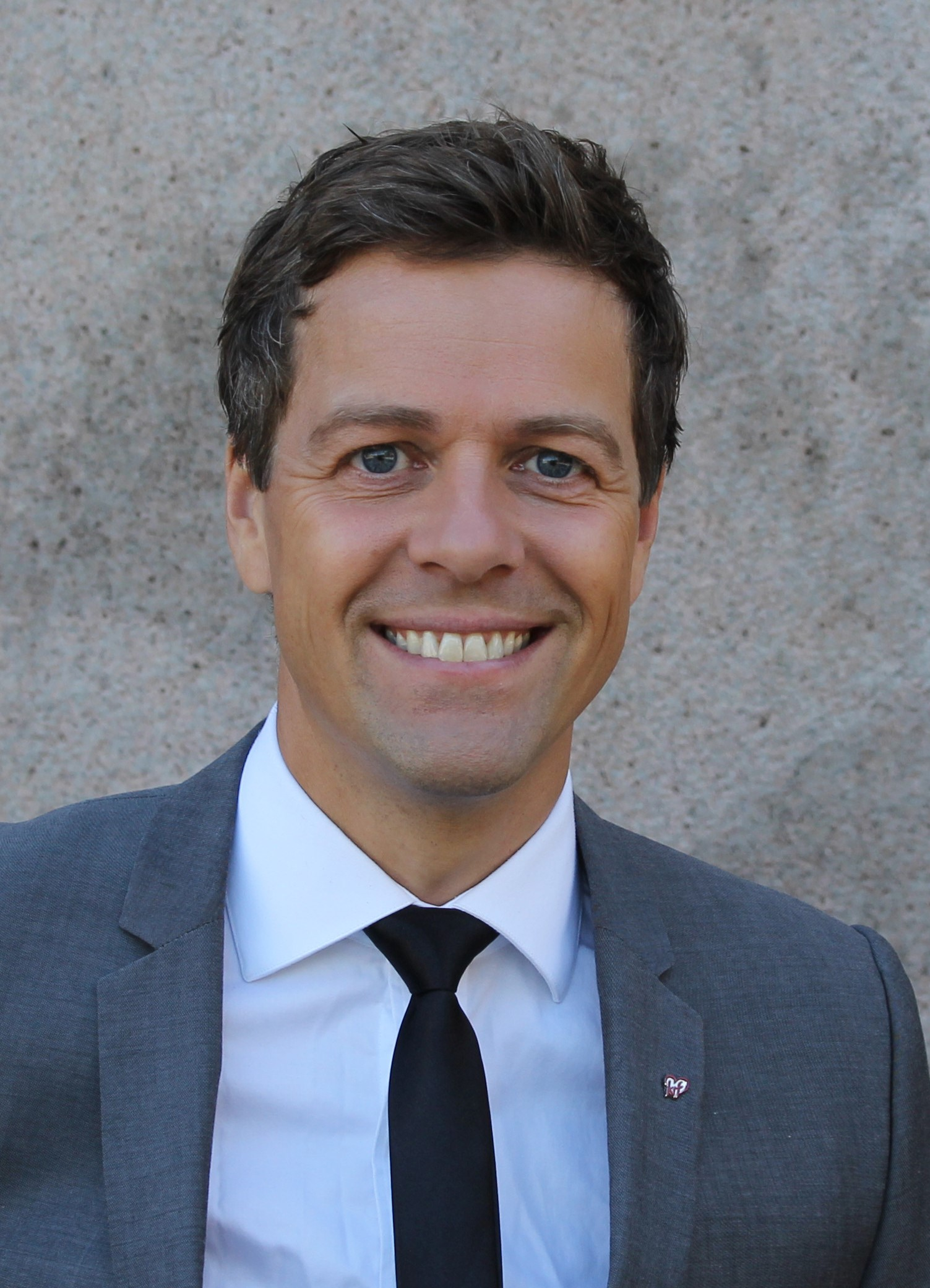

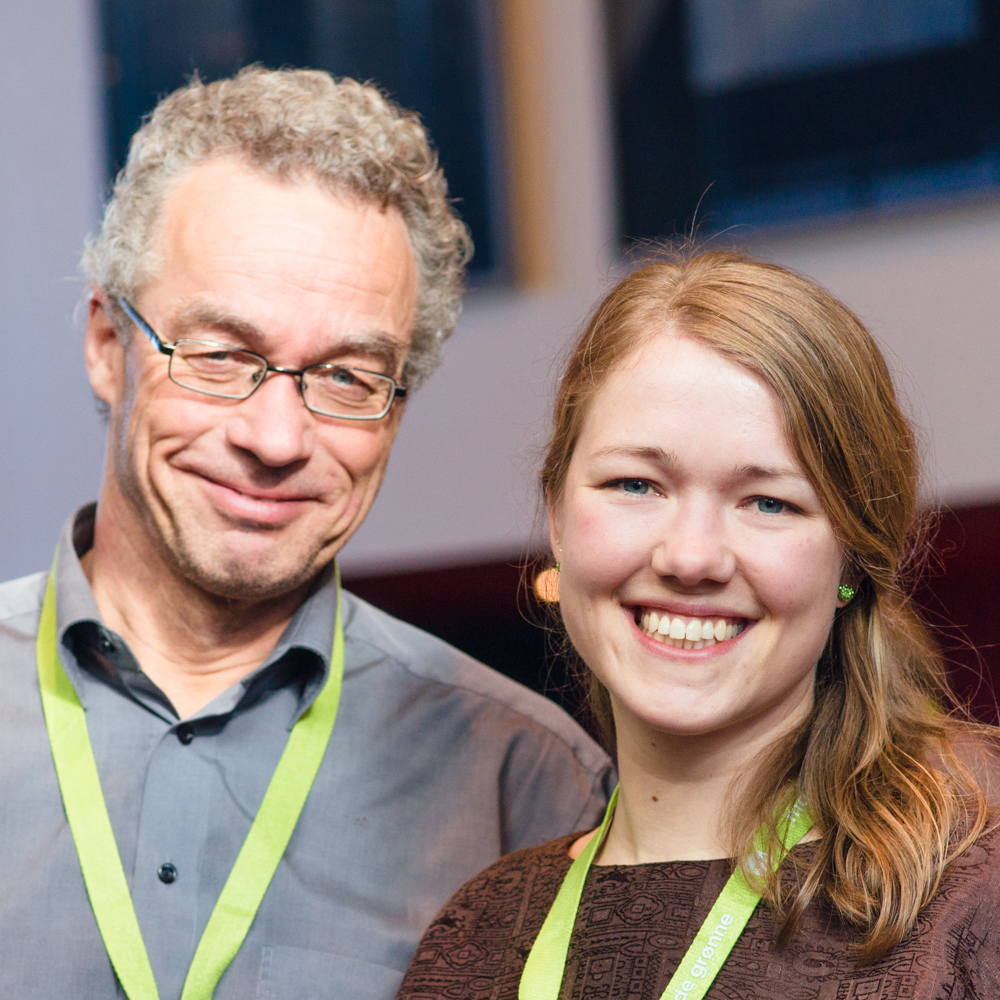

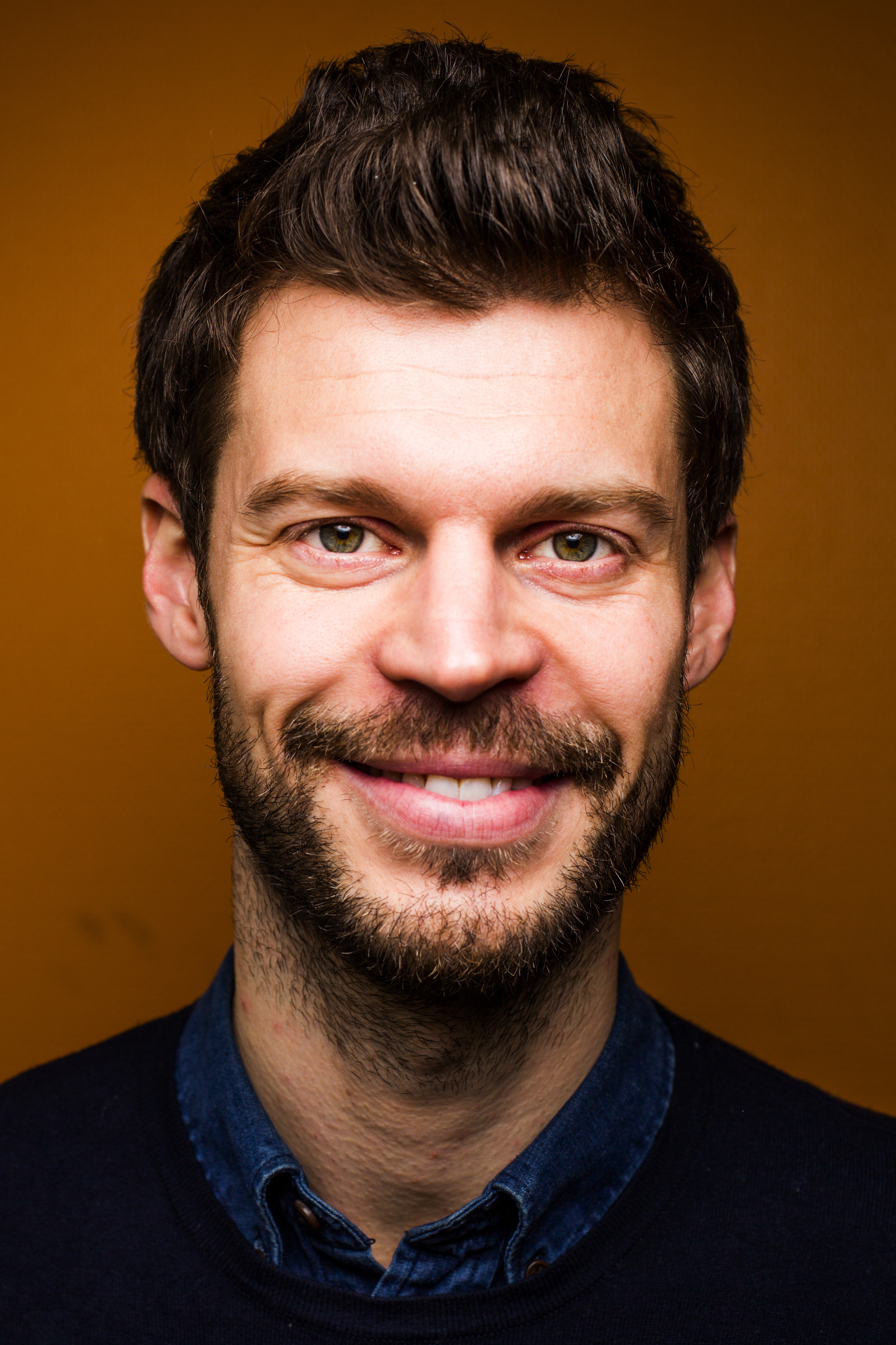
	First party	Second party	Third party
Leader	Jonas Gahr Støre	Erna Solberg	Siv Jensen
Party	Labour	Conservative	Progress
Last election	55 seats, 30.84%	48 seats, 26.81%	29 seats, 16.35%
Seats won	49	45	27
Seat change	▼6	▼3	▼2
Popular vote	800,947	732,895	444,681
Percentage	27.37%	25.04%	15.19%
Swing	▼3.47 pp	▼1.77 pp	▼1.16 pp
	Fourth party	Fifth party	Sixth party
Leader	Trygve Slagsvold Vedum	Audun Lysbakken	Trine Skei Grande
Party	Centre	Socialist Left	Liberal
Leader since	7 April 2014	11 March 2012	6 May 2012
Last election	10 seats, 5.48%	7 seats, 4.1%	9 seats, 5.23%
Seats won	19	11	8
Seat change	▲9	▲4	▼1
Popular vote	302,017	176,222	127,910
Percentage	10.32%	6.02%	4.37%
Swing	▲4.84 pp	▲1.93 pp	▼0.86 pp
	Seventh party	Eighth party	Ninth party
Leader	Knut Arild Hareide	Rasmus Hansson; Une Aina Bastholm	Bjørnar Moxnes
Party	Christian; Democratic	Green	Red
Last election	10 seats, 5.59%	1 seat, 2.79%	0 seats, 1.08%
Seats won	8	1	1
Seat change	▼2	Steady	▲1
Popular vote	122,797	94,788	70,522
Percentage	4.20%	3.24%	2.41%
Swing	▼1.39 pp	▲0.45 pp	▲1.33 pp
Prime Minister before election
Erna Solberg
Conservative
Prime Minister after election
Erna Solberg
Conservative

Parliamentary elections were held in Norway on 11 September 2017 to elect all 169 members of the unicameral Norwegian Parliament, the Storting. The non-socialist parties retained a reduced majority of 88 seats, allowing Prime Minister Erna Solberg's Conservative-Progress coalition to remain in government. The Liberal Party joined the coalition in January 2018 but it remained a minority cabinet until the Christian Democratic Party joined the coalition in 2019. The three largest centre-left parties won 79 seats. The Green Party retained its single seat, while the Red Party won its first ever seat.

== Background ==
The last parliamentary elections in Norway were held on 9 September 2013. The outcome was a victory for the Conservatives and their populist right-wing allies. The Conservative Party, led by Erna Solberg, and the right-wing populist Progress Party formed a two-party minority government, with Solberg as Prime Minister. The two parties received confidence and supply from two centrist parties, the Liberals and the Christian Democrats.

== Electoral system ==
The election used party-list proportional representation in nineteen multi-member constituencies, one for each of the counties of Norway.

The number of members to be returned from each constituency varies between 4 and 19. To determine the apportionment of the 169 seats amongst the 19 counties, a two-tier formula is used, based on population and geographic size. Each inhabitant counts one point, while each square kilometer counts 1.8 points.

150 of the seats are regular district seats. These are awarded based on the election results in each county, and are unaffected by results in other counties. Nineteen of the seats (one for each county) are leveling seats, awarded to parties who win fewer seats than their share of the national popular vote otherwise entitles them to. A modification of the Sainte-Lague method, where the first quotient for each party is calculated using a divisor of 1.4 instead of 1, is used to allocate both the constituency and leveling seats. A party must win 4% of the popular vote in order to win compensation seats, but may still win district seats even if it fails to reach this threshold. The system for apportioning seats is biased in favour of rural areas since the area of the county is a factor, but the system of compensation seats reduces the effect this has on final party strength.

Seats by constituency
Constituency	Population	Area (km^{2})	Seats
Østfold	278,352	4,182	9
Akershus	556,254	4,918	17
Oslo	613,285	454	19
Hedmark	192,791	27,398	7
Oppland	187,147	25,192	7
Buskerud	265,164	14,911	9
Vestfold	236,424	2,224	7
Telemark	170,023	15,298	6
Aust-Agder	111,495	9,157	4
Vest-Agder	174,324	7,277	6
Rogaland	443,115	9,376	14
Hordaland	490,570	15,440	16
Sogn og Fjordane	108,201	18,623	4
Møre og Romsdal	256,628	15,115	9
Sør-Trøndelag	297,950	18,856	10
Nord-Trøndelag	133,390	22,415	5
Nordland	238,320	38,462	9
Troms	158,650	25,870	6
Finnmark	73,787	48,617	5

=== Date ===
According to the Norwegian constitution, parliamentary elections must be held every four years. The Norwegian parliament may not be dissolved before such a four-year term has ended, a rather rare trait of a political system found in few, if any democracies besides Norway and the USA.

On 22 April 2016, the Norwegian government announced that the date of the election is set to be Monday, 11 September 2017. Additionally, each municipal council may vote to extend voting by one day, by also opening the polling stations on Sunday, 10 September.

== Participating parties ==
Eight political parties were represented in the Norwegian parliament prior to the election, all of whom went on to contest the 2017 election.

- The Labour Party (Ap) is with its 55 seats in parliament the largest party of the 2013-2017 parliament. Labour describes itself as a social-democratic party of the centre-left. The party is led by former minister of foreign affairs Jonas Gahr Støre, who has served as party leader and leader of the opposition since June 2014.
- The Conservative Party (H) is the largest party of the incumbent government. Currently, the Conservatives hold 48 seats, after having garnered close to 27 percent of the vote in the previous election. The Conservatives' party leader is Prime Minister Erna Solberg. The Conservative Party is considered to be a moderate centre-right party in the Norwegian political spectrum, and it officially subscribes to the liberal conservative ideology.
- The Progress Party (FrP) is led by Siv Jensen and currently serves as the junior partner in the Solberg cabinet. The party identifies as classical liberal and conservative-liberal. Political scientists broadly consider it a right-wing populist party, a label the party denies.
- The Christian Democratic Party (KrF) is a centre to centre-right party, based on Christian democratic values. The party is led by Knut Arild Hareide, and participated in the 2013 election as a proponent of the centre-right coalition led by the Conservatives.
- The Centre Party (Sp) is the fifth largest party in the Norwegian legislature, with 10 seats. Between 2005 and 2013 the party served as a junior partner in the Red-Green government. The party is led by Trygve Slagsvold Vedum. The party is centrist and primarily agrarian, with some conservative and some liberal factions.
- The Liberal Party (V) of Trine Skei Grande currently holds 9 seats in the Norwegian parliament. It claims to be the sole social-liberal party in the country, and positions itself in the centre of Norwegian politics. The Liberals have a close relationship with the Christian Democrats.
- The Socialist Left Party (SV) is the second smallest party in parliament, and campaigned for a third term as a part of the Red-Green coalition government in 2013. The party sees itself as democratic socialist and environmentalist. Since 2012, Audun Lysbakken has chaired the party.
- The Green Party (MDG) made its debut in the Norwegian parliament in the 2013 election, gaining a single seat from the Oslo district. The Greens have no official party leader, but rather two national spokespersons. Currently, these spokespersons are Une Aina Bastholm and Rasmus Hansson. The party distances itself from the left-right axis, and identifies as an environmentalist party.

Additionally, the far-left Red Party led by Bjørnar Moxnes secured its first seat via a direct mandate in Oslo district. It had failed to secure representation in previous elections. The party is officially Communist in orientation and is a successor to the Red Electoral Alliance, which had previously won a seat in the 1993 election.

== Campaign ==
=== Slogans ===
Party	Original slogan	English translation
Labour Party	"Alle skal med"	«Everyone must join»
Conservative Party	"Vi tror på Norge"	«We believe in Norway»
Progress Party		
Christian Democratic Party		
Centre Party	"Senterpartiet skal stoppe sentraliseringa i Norge gjennom ei regjering for hele Norge"	«Centre party shall stop the centralization in Norway through a government for all of Norway»
Liberal Party		
Socialist Left Party		
Red Electoral Alliance		

=== Donations ===
According to Statistisk sentralbyrå, a total of 67.34 million NOK in campaign contributions was raised by all political parties in 2017.

Party	Donations (NOK)
Labour Party	29,688,423
Conservative Party	15,363,600
Socialist Left Party	6,229,207
Progress Party	4,339,200
Centre Party	4,037,657
Liberal Party	3,633,991
Green Party	1,212,476
Red Party	1,149,862
Christian Democratic Party	145,230

=== Debates ===
2017 Norwegian general election debates
Date	Time	Organisers	P Present I Invitee N Non-invitee A Absent invitee.									
Date	Time	Organisers	Ap	H	Frp	KrF	Sp	V	Sv	R	MdG	Refs
9 August		Civita	P Jonas Gahr Støre	P Erna Solberg	N Siv Jensen	N Knut Arild Hareide	N Trygve Slagsvold Vedum	N Trine Skei Grande	N Audun Lysbakken	N Bjørnar Moxnes	N Une Bastholm	
14 August	21:30	NRK	P Jonas Gahr Støre	P Erna Solberg	P Siv Jensen	P Knut Arild Hareide	P Trygve Slagsvold Vedum	P Trine Skei Grande	P Audun Lysbakken	P Bjørnar Moxnes	P Une Bastholm	
29 August	21:30	NRK	P Jonas Gahr Støre	P Erna Solberg	N Siv Jensen	N Knut Arild Hareide	N Trygve Slagsvold Vedum	N Trine Skei Grande	N Audun Lysbakken	N Bjørnar Moxnes	N Une Bastholm	
5 September	18:00	Dagen and Bergens Tidende	N Jonas Gahr Støre	N Erna Solberg	P Sylvi Listhaug	A Knut Arild Hareide	N Trygve Slagsvold Vedum	N Trine Skei Grande	N Audun Lysbakken	N Bjørnar Moxnes	N Une Bastholm	
8 September	21:25	NRK	P Jonas Gahr Støre	P Erna Solberg	P Siv Jensen	P Knut Arild Hareide	P Trygve Slagsvold Vedum	P Trine Skei Grande	P Audun Lysbakken	P Bjørnar Moxnes	P Rasmus Hansson	
12 September	21:30	NRK	P Jonas Gahr Støre	P Erna Solberg	P Siv Jensen	P Knut Arild Hareide	P Trygve Slagsvold Vedum	P Trine Skei Grande	P Audun Lysbakken	P Bjørnar Moxnes	P Une Bastholm	

== Opinion polls ==
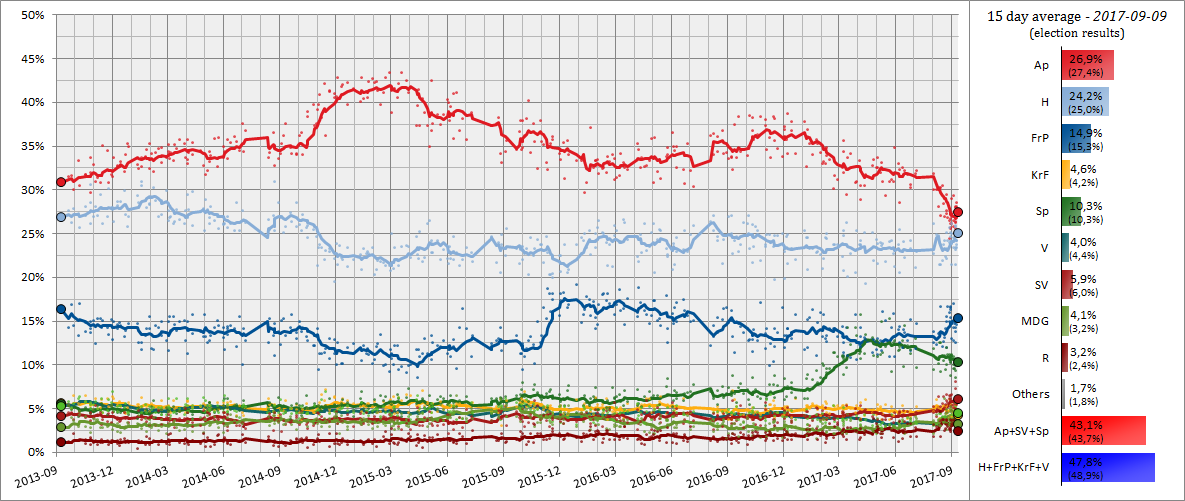
30 day moving average of poll results since the 2013 election, with each line corresponding to a political party.
Longer term polling results based on monthly averages from pollofpolls.

Zoom on the smaller parties.

=== Seat predictions ===
Polling Period	Government				Opposition					Government	Opposition	Government Lead
Polling Period	H	FrP	KrF	V	Ap	Sp	SV	MdG	Red	Government	Opposition	Government Lead
September 2017	42	28	8	7	48	17	10	7	2	85	84	+1
August 2017	42	28	9	2	50	19	10	7	2	81	88	-7
July 2017	40	24	9	2	58	20	8	7	1	75	94	-19
June 2017	43	25	8	2	59	22	8	1	1	78	91	-13
May 2017	43	24	9	2	58	22	8	1	2	78	91	-13
April 2017	43	24	9	2	58	23	8	1	1	78	91	-13
March 2017	43	23	9	3	60	21	8	1	1	78	91	-13
February 2017	42	27	9	3	60	18	8	1	1	81	88	-7
January 2017	41	24	9	7	65	14	7	1	1	81	88	-7
December 2016	41	25	8	7	66	12	8	1	1	81	88	-7
November 2016	41	22	9	8	68	12	7	1	1	80	89	-9
October 2016	45	25	8	8	67	12	2	1	1	86	83	+3
September 2016	44	26	8	7	63	12	7	1	1	85	84	+1
August 2016	46	26	9	7	65	12	2	1	1	88	81	+7
July 2016	46	27	9	8	57	13	7	1	1	90	79	+11
June 2016	40	28	9	7	63	11	8	2	1	84	85	-1
May 2016	42	28	9	8	61	12	7	1	1	87	82	+5
April 2016	42	30	9	8	60	11	7	1	1	89	80	+9
March 2016	46	31	9	8	60	11	2	1	1	94	75	+19
February 2016	43	30	9	8	59	10	7	2	1	90	79	+11
January 2016	43	29	9	8	58	10	7	4	1	89	80	+9
December 2015	39	32	9	7	61	11	1	8	1	87	82	+5
November 2015	39	29	9	7	64	11	2	7	1	84	85	-1
October 2015	39	19	9	8	68	11	7	7	1	75	94	-19
September 2015	40	20	9	8	66	10	7	8	1	77	92	-15
August 2015	42	23	9	8	66	10	2	8	1	82	87	-5
July 2015	38	22	9	8	69	8	7	7	1	77	92	-15
June 2015	39	21	9	8	72	10	1	8	1	77	92	-15
May 2015	42	21	9	8	70	10	1	7	1	80	89	-9
April 2015	41	20	10	9	73	10	1	4	1	80	89	-9
March 2015	41	19	10	8	76	11	2	1	1	78	91	-13
February 2015	38	20	10	9	77	10	2	2	1	77	92	-15
January 2015	41	20	10	8	76	10	2	2	0	79	90	-11
December 2014	40	20	10	9	77	9	2	2	0	79	90	-11
November 2014	40	21	11	8	74	10	2	2	1	80	89	-9
October 2014	46	24	8	8	69	9	2	2	1	86	83	+3
September 2014	49	26	9	9	64	9	2	1	0	93	76	+17
August 2014	50	26	9	9	63	9	2	1	0	94	75	+19
July 2014	48	22	8	10	67	10	1	2	1	88	81	+7
June 2014	48	25	10	9	64	10	1	1	1	92	77	+15
May 2014	47	26	9	9	61	8	7	1	1	91	78	+13
April 2014	50	26	10	10	62	8	2	1	0	96	73	+23
March 2014	49	26	9	9	63	9	2	1	1	93	76	+17
February 2014	52	24	10	9	62	9	2	1	0	95	74	+21
January 2014	53	26	10	9	60	8	2	1	0	98	71	+27
December 2013	51	26	10	9	61	9	2	1	0	96	73	+23
November 2013	52	26	9	9	56	9	7	1	0	96	73	+23
October 2013	52	26	9	10	56	8	7	1	0	97	72	+25

== Results ==
Party	Votes	%	Seats	+/–
Labour Party	800,947	27.37	49	–6
Conservative Party	732,895	25.04	45	–3
Progress Party	444,681	15.19	27	–2
Centre Party	302,017	10.32	19	+9
Socialist Left Party	176,222	6.02	11	+4
Liberal Party	127,910	4.37	8	–1
Christian Democratic Party	122,797	4.20	8	–2
Green Party	94,788	3.24	1	0
Red Party	70,522	2.41	1	+1
Pensioners' Party	12,855	0.44	0	0
Health Party	10,337	0.35	0	New
The Christians	8,700	0.30	0	0
Capitalist Party	5,599	0.19	0	New
Democrats in Norway	3,830	0.13	0	0
Pirate Party	3,356	0.11	0	0
The Alliance	3,311	0.11	0	New
Coastal Party	2,467	0.08	0	0
Nordmøre List	2,135	0.07	0	New
Feminist Initiative	696	0.02	0	New
Communist Party	309	0.01	0	0
Norway Party	151	0.01	0	New
Party of Values	148	0.01	0	New
Society Party	104	0.00	0	0
Northern Assembly	59	0.00	0	New
Total	2,926,836	100.00	169	0
Valid votes	2,926,836	99.20		
Invalid/blank votes	23,695	0.80		
Total votes	2,950,531	100.00		
Registered voters/turnout	3,765,245	78.36		
Source: valgresultat.no

=== Seat distribution ===
Constituency	Total seats	Seats won											
Constituency	Total seats	By party									By coalition		
Constituency	Total seats	A	H	FrP	Sp	SV	V	KrF	MdG	R	Red-Greens	Borgerlig	Others
Akershus	17	5	6	3	1	1	1				7	10	
Aust-Agder	4	1	1	1				1			1	3	
Buskerud	9	3	2	2	1	1					5	4	
Finnmark	5	2	1	1	1						3	2	
Hedmark	7	2	1	1	2	1					5	2	
Hordaland	16	4	5	2	2	1	1	1			7	9	
Møre og Romsdal	9	2	3	2	1			1			3	6	
Nord-Trøndelag	5	2	1		1		1				3	2	
Nordland	9	2	2	2	2	1					5	4	
Oppland	7	2	1	1	2		1				4	3	
Oslo	19	5	6	2		2	2		1	1	7	10	2
Østfold	9	3	2	2	1	1					5	4	
Rogaland	14	4	4	3	1	1		1			6	8	
Sogn og Fjordane	4	1	1		1			1			2	2	
Sør-Trøndelag	10	4	2	1	1	1	1				6	4	
Telemark	6	2	1	1	1			1			3	3	
Troms	6	2	1	1	1	1					4	2	
Vest-Agder	6	1	2	1				2			1	5	
Vestfold	7	2	3	1			1				2	4	
Total	169	49	45	27	19	11	8	8	1	1	80	87	2
Source: Election Authority

=== Voter demographics ===
Cohort	Percentage of cohort voting for									
Cohort	Ap	H	FrP	Sp	Sv	V	KrF	MDG	R	Others
Total vote	27.37%	25.04%	15.19%	10.32%	6.02%	4.37%	4.20%	3.24%	2.41%	
Gender
Females	29.4%	23.7%	11.6%	9.6%	8.7%	4.9%	9.6%	3.7%	2.1%	
Males	25.4%	26.3%	18.5%	11.1%	3.5%	3.9%	11.1%	2.8%	2.7%	
Age
18–30 years old	22%	17.4%	12.7%	12.7%	8.5%	10.4%	3.5%	6.6%	3.1%	
30-59 years old	28.4%	27.8%	13.3%	9.5%	6.2%	3.7%	3.6%	3.5%	2.6%	
60 years old and older	28.5%	24.1%	20.3%	10.4%	4.4%	2.2%	5.5%	0.9%	1.8%	
Work
low income	26%	21%	16.5%	12.9%	6.2%	4.3%	4.3%	4.1%	2.1%	
Average income	27.9%	22.1%	17.1%	11%	7.1%	3.7%	4.5%	2.6%	2.8%	
High income	29%	33.5%	11.2%	7.6%	4.7%	4.3%	3.7%	2.7%	1.8%	
Education
Primary school	28.7%	22.3%	21.7%	13.1%	2.9%	3.2%	3.2%	1.6%	1%	
High school	24.6%	25.1%	19.4%	11.9%	5.7%	3.4%	4%	2.6%	1.6%	
University/college	28.9%	26.4%	9.5%	8.1%	7.7%	5.5%	4.6%	4.5%	3.4%	
Source: Norwegian Institute for Social Research

=== Results by municipality ===
Labour

Conservative

Progress

Centre

Socialist

Liberal

Christian

Green

Red

== Aftermath ==
Prime Minister Solberg set out to form a governing coalition between the Conservative Party, Progress Party, Liberal Party, and the Christian Democrats. In late September 2017, the Christian Democrats left coalition talks due to the inclusion of the Progress Party.

On 14 January 2018, a government was formed by the Conservative Party, the Progress Party and the Liberal Party.

The Christian Democrats voted at a party conference to join Solberg's government on 2 November 2018 and on 16 January 2019, Solberg's Conservatives struck a deal with the Christian Democratic Party. This marked the first time since 1985 that Norway would be getting a majority government representing right-wing parties in the Storting.

On 20 January 2020, the Progress Party decided to withdraw from the government due to a decision by Solberg to repatriate a woman linked to Islamic State and her children back to Norway. Solberg said that she would continue to head a minority government and the other parties in the coalition (Liberal Party, Christian Democrats) said they would also continue to serve in it.

== See also ==
- 2017 Norwegian Sámi parliamentary election
