= Kristoffer Robin Haug =

Norwegian politician (born 1984)

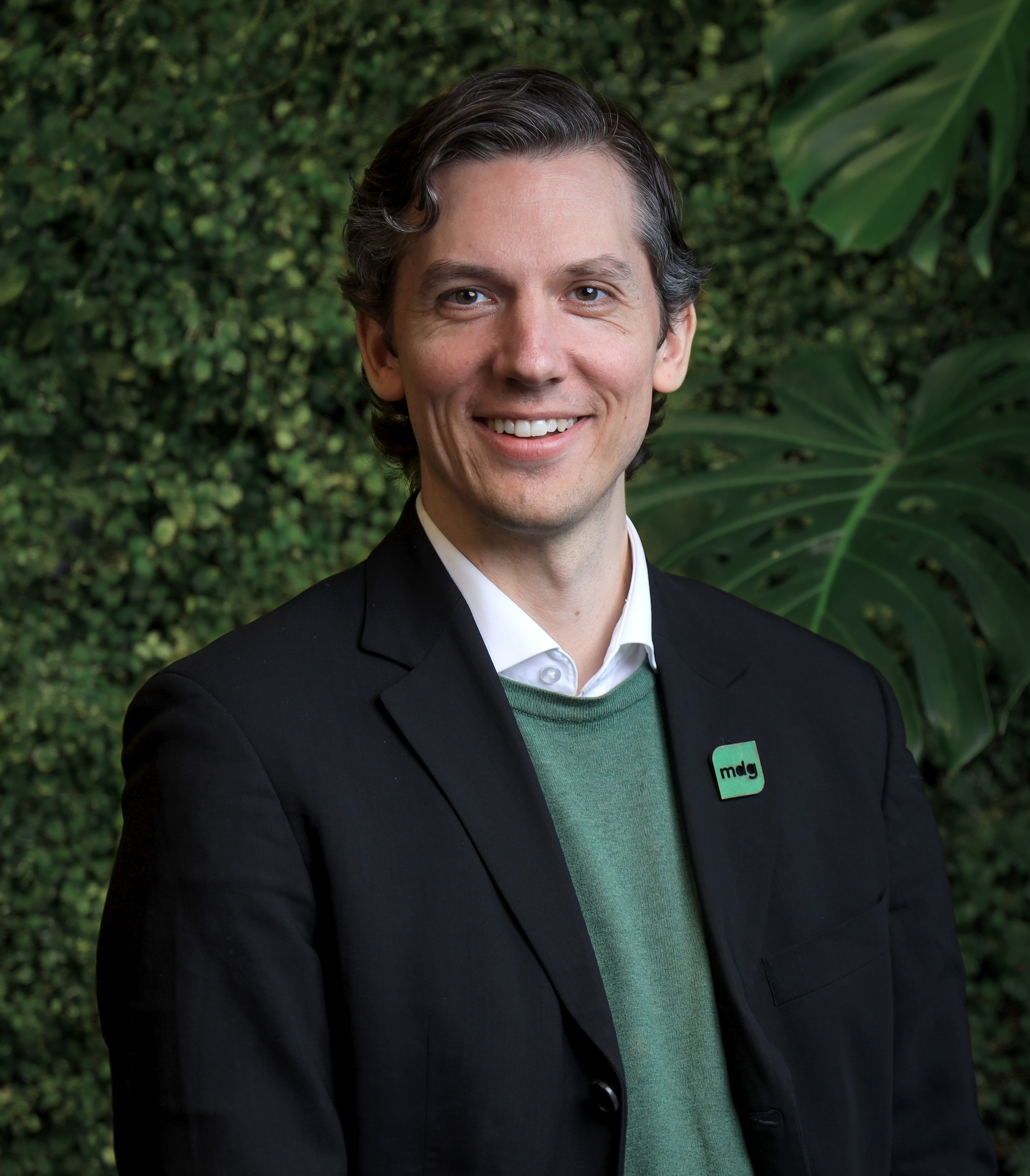

Kristoffer Robin Haug (born 1 August 1984) is a Norwegian politician for the Green Party

He served as a deputy representative to the Parliament of Norway from Oslo during the term 2017–2021 and Akershus during the terms 2021–2025 and 2025–2029. He took a master's degree in science at the University of Oslo and became involved in borough politics there. Having moved to Ås, in the 2019 Norwegian local elections he was elected to Viken county council and was also County Commissioner of Transport and Communications from 2019 to 2020, when the Green Party left the county cabinet.

In May 2022 he ran to become deputy leader of the Green Party nationwide. Arild Hermstad won the vote, but in August 2022, leader Une Bastholm announced her stepping down, and an extraordinary national convention was held in November 2022 to select her successor as leader. Haug again ran against Hermstad, but ultimately lost with 101 votes to 102.
