= Green Party (Norway) =

Norwegian green political party

Environment Party The Greens Miljøpartiet De Grønne Miljøpartiet Dei Grøne
- Abbreviation: MDG
- Leader: Arild Hermstad
- Deputy Leader: Ingrid Liland
- Deputy Leader: Jonas Maas Nilsen
- Founders: Arne Næss; Johan Galtung; Sigmund Kvaløy Setreng
- Founded: 29 October 1988
- Headquarters: Oslo
- Youth wing: Young Greens of Norway
- Membership (2024): ▼9,903
- Ideology: Green politics Pro-Europeanism; Republicanism (Norwegian)
- Political position: Centre-left
- European affiliation: European Green Party
- International affiliation: Global Greens
- Colours: Light Green (customary); Green (official)
- Storting: 8 / 169
- County Councils: 36 / 574
- Municipal Councils: 157 / 9,344

Website
- mdg.no

The Green Party (Bokmål: Miljøpartiet De Grønne, Nynorsk: Miljøpartiet Dei Grøne, lit. 'Environment Party The Greens', MDG; Northern Sami: Birasbellodat Ruonát) is a centre-left green political party in Norway. The party currently holds eight seats in the Storting and is represented in municipal and county councils, having attained 4.7% and 4.1% in 2025 parliamentary election and 2023 local elections respectively. Its 2025 result marks the first time the party surpassed the 4% electoral threshold required to qualify for leveling seats in the Storting, securing an all-time high of eight representatives.

Similar to its German role model Alliance 90/The Greens, MDG represents green politics with social liberal features. It has been described as centre-left by academics and voters. The party has historical roots partly in the new left of the 1960s and 1970s, and partly in the broader environmental movement of the 1970s and 1980s, which itself was highly diverse and attracted support from both the new left and environmentally-oriented liberals and conservatives who rallied around environmental issues. Over time the party has moved in a more centrist and socially liberal direction. MDG stands in a progressive tradition and also defines itself as an intersectional feminist party, and was one of the around 30 organizations behind a 2025 call for an inclusive feminism.

The party claims distance from the two dominant right-wing and left-wing political blocks, jointly denominated as "the fossil block". The party has gradually moved closer to liberal internationalism over time, allowing for the use of military force when it can promote peace and human rights. MDG supports Norwegian EU membership and NATO membership, while also advocating for a focus on arms control and peaceful conflict resolution. The party's voters are among the most pro-EU, and MDG has been described as a party for "urban, liberal, moderately left-wing academics."

The Green Party is a member of the European Green Party and the Global Greens and was founded with the German Greens as its stated model. It maintains close ties to other Green parties including the German Greens and the Swedish Greens. It is led by Arild Hermstad.

== History ==
The process of forming a new national green party in Norway was initiated in December 1984, with the official launch in 1988. Among the pioneers were the late philosopher Arne Næss, peace researcher Johan Galtung, and the philosopher Sigmund Kvaløy Setreng.

In the local elections between 1991 and 2009, the Green Party had six to eight representatives elected each time. In the national elections the party never exceeded 0.5% support.

Since 2005, the Greens have seen a significant membership rise, with the new members coming from a wide variety of other parties, including the seven established parliamentary parties.

In the municipal elections of 2011, the party saw its first local breakthrough, having garnered close to 22,000 votes on a national basis. Two years later, during the campaign for the 2013 general election, the party saw a significant rise in support in the opinion polls. The Greens were widely expected to gain parliamentary representation to some extent. In the election, the Greens gathered over 79,000 votes, making them the eighth biggest party in the country. This vote count translates to 2.8 percent of the vote. Rasmus Hansson, the party's top candidate from Oslo was elected to parliament, becoming the first ever Green MP.

In the local elections of 2015 the Green Party overtook the 4% nationally for the first time in its history and got the third place in Oslo.

The party have stated their refusal to form a government with any parties that will continue to drill for oil in the North Sea.

The party had its best result at the 2021 parliamentary election, winning three seats in the Storting and falling just short of the 4% threshold for levelling seats. In 2025, the party expanded even further, winning 4.7% of the vote and eight seats in the Storting.

== Ideology ==
The Green Party is one of the global ecologist and environmentalist political parties and movements. As a member of the pan-European European Green Party, the Norwegian Greens subscribe to social progressivism and social justice. The main focus of the party is environmental protection and ecological sustainability. The party seeks to introduce a tax on wasteful consumption, and to reorganise the food industry. The Greens have also pledged support for a reform in the agrarian industry, increasing the production of organic crops and strengthening the eco-friendly agricultural sector.

The Green Party defines itself as intersectional feminist. Its youth wing works closely with the Initiative for Inclusive Feminism and has been one of the organizers of Inclusive March 8. In 2025 Frøya Sjursæther called for a reckoning with transphobia. In 2025 the Green Party was among the signatories of a call for an inclusive feminism with about 30 other organizations.

The Green Party seeks to reduce the Norwegian petroleum extraction in order to counteract serious climate change. The proposal is to stop extraction by 2040.

The Green Party is also in favor of the replacement of the monarchy with a republican form of government.

== Leadership ==
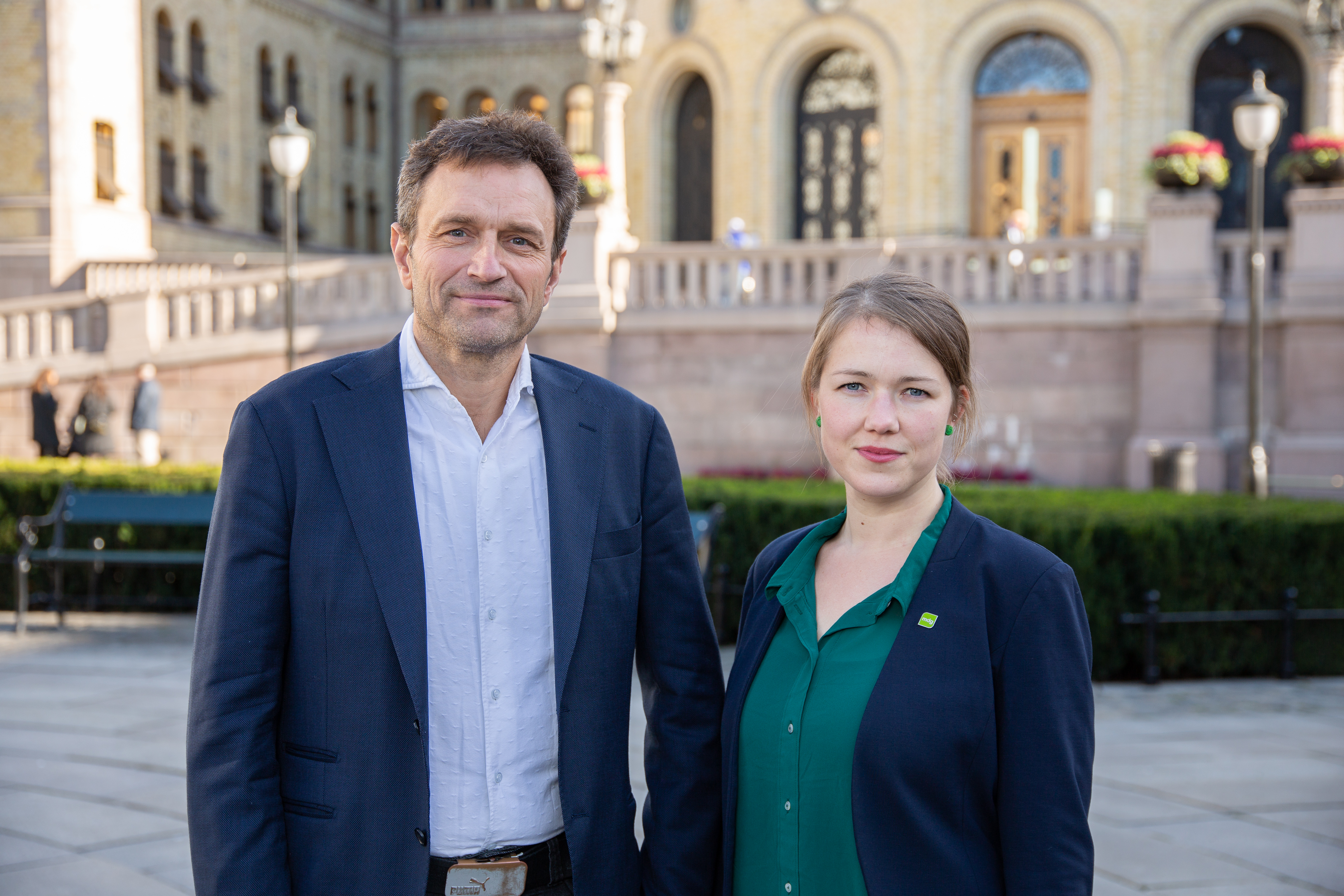
Arild Hermstad and Une Aina Bastholm, the party's last spokespeople, pictured in October 2018

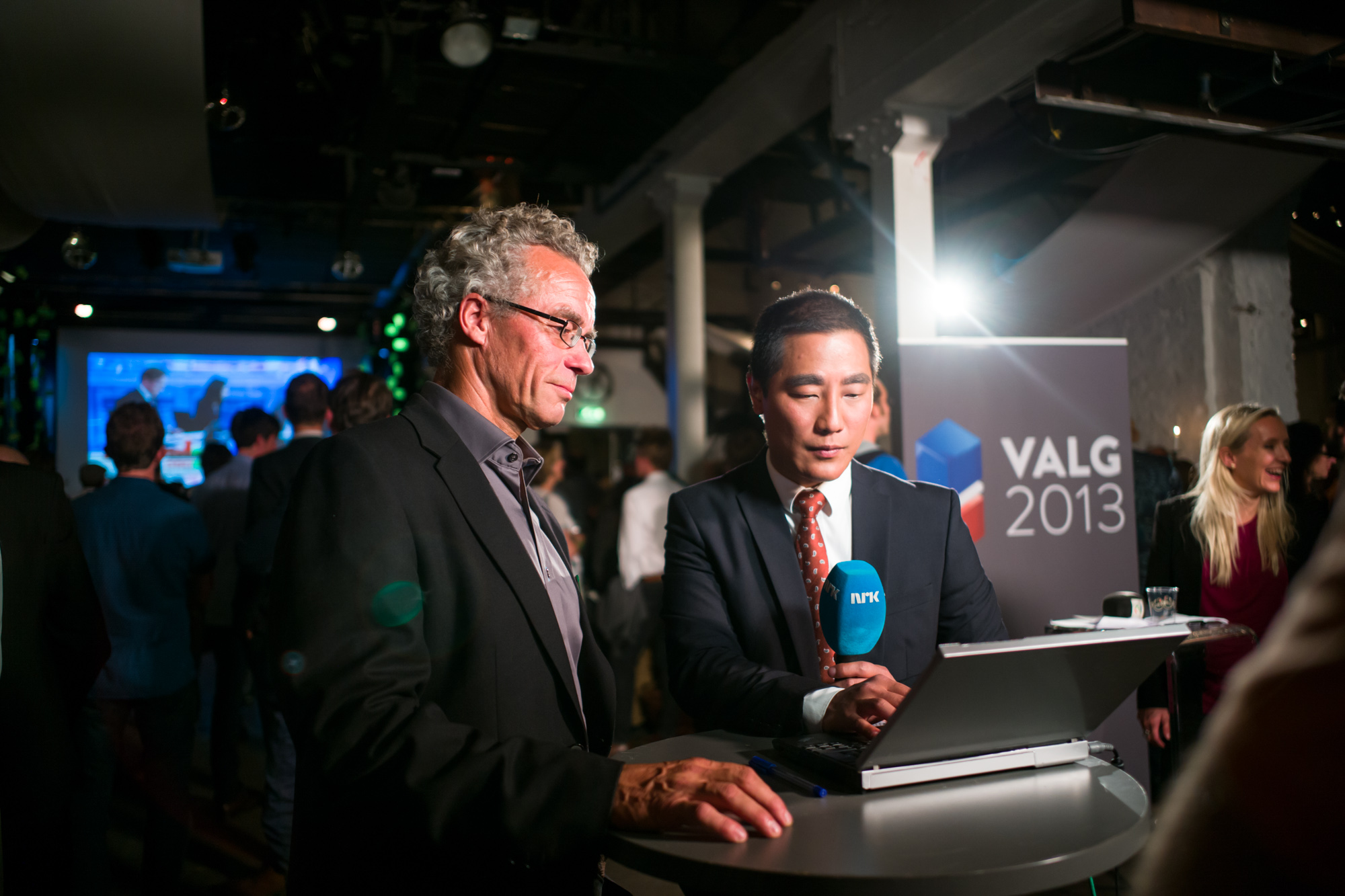
The party's member of Parliament, Rasmus Hansson, being interviewed by the Norwegian Broadcasting Corporation on the 2013 election night

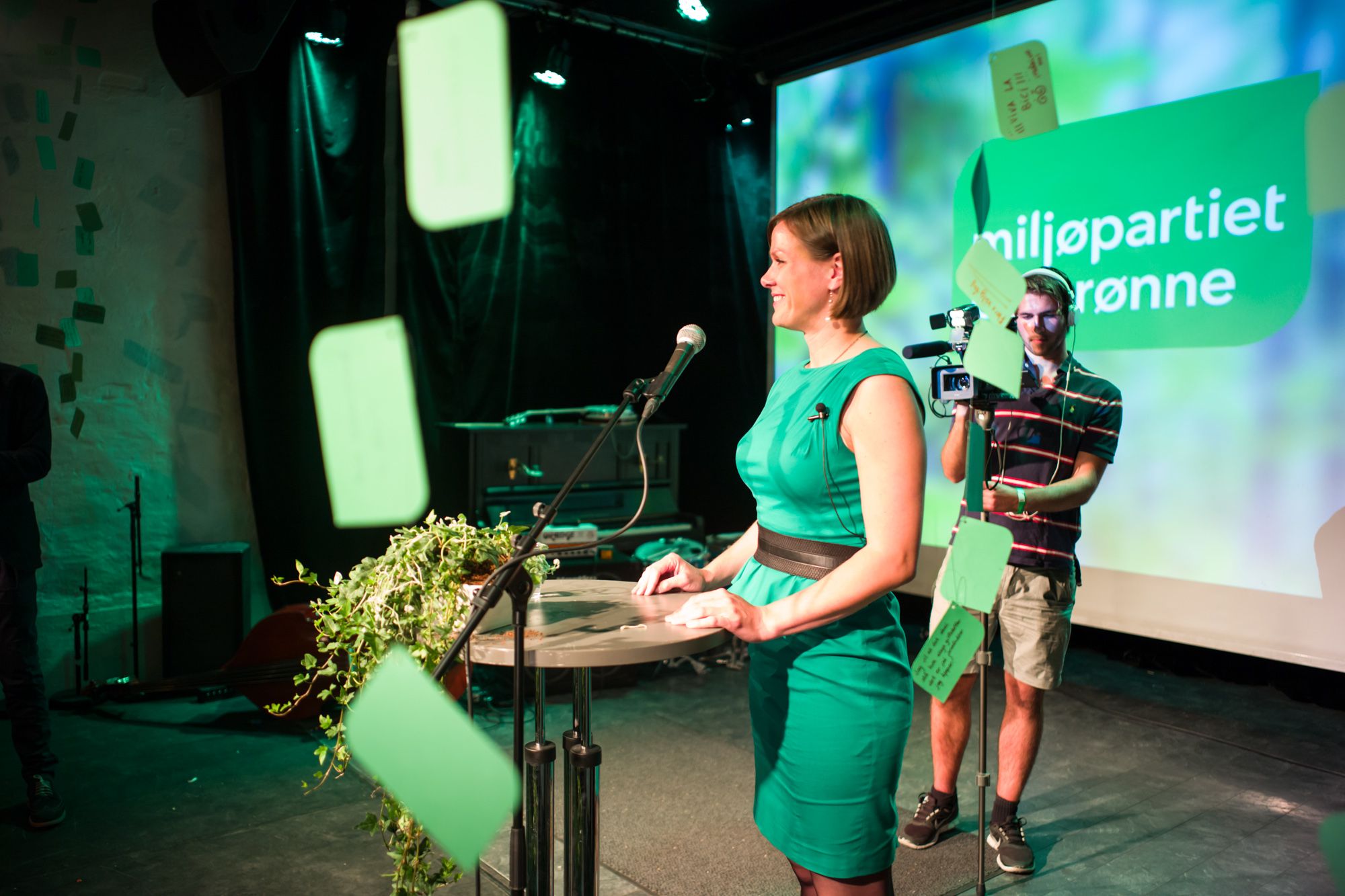
Former national spokeswoman Hanna Marcussen, pictured in September 2013

=== Spokespersons ===
- Ove Braaten, 1989–1991
- Olav Benestad, 1991–1992
- Jan Bojer Vindheim, 1993–1996 /1997–2001
- Ane Aadland, 1995–1997
- Arne Gravanes, 1996–1997
- Birte Simonsen, 1998–1999
- Brynmor Evans, 1998–1999
- Gunter Schotz, 1999–2000
- Lisa Fröyland, 1999–2002
- Tove Funderud Johansen, 2000–2001
- Birte Simonsen, 2002–2004
- Brynmor Evans, 2004–2005
- Trude Malthe Thomassen, 2004–2007
- Gaute Busch, 2005–2006
- Mats Indrefjord Høllesli, 2006–2007
- Birte Simonsen, 2007–2008
- Sondre Båtstrand, 2008–2011
- Hanna Marcussen, 2008–2014
- Harald August Nissen, 2011–2014
- Hilde Opoku, 2014–2016
- Rasmus Hansson, 2016–2018
- Arild Hermstad, 2018–2020
- Une Aina Bastholm, 2016–2020

=== Leaders ===
- Une Aina Bastholm, 2020–22
- Arild Hermstad, 2022–

=== Deputy leaders ===
- Arild Hermstad, 2020–2022
- Kriss Rokkan Iversen, 2020–2022
- Ingrid Liland, 2022–
- Lan Marie Berg, 2022–

== Electoral performance ==
=== Storting ===
Election	Votes	%	Seats	+/–	Position	Status
1989	10,136	0.4	0 / 165	New	▲9th	No seats
1993	3,054	0.1	0 / 165	Steady	▼12th	No seats
1997	5,884	0.2	0 / 165	Steady	▲11th	No seats
2001	3,785	0.2	0 / 165	Steady	▼13th	No seats
2005	3,652	0.1	0 / 169	Steady	▲12th	No seats
2009	9,286	0.3	0 / 169	Steady	▲10th	No seats
2013	79,152	2.8	1 / 169	▲1	▲8th	Opposition
2017	94,427	3.2	1 / 169	Steady	8th	Opposition
2021	117,647	3.9	3 / 169	▲2	8th	Opposition
2025	152,782	4.7	8 / 169	▲5	▲7th	External support

=== Local elections ===
Election	Vote %	Type
1991	0.3; 0.4	Municipal; County
1995	0.3; 0.4	Municipal; County
1999	0.3; 0.4	Municipal; County
2003	0.2; 0.2	Municipal; County
2007	0.3; 0.6	Municipal; County
2011	0.9; 1.3	Municipal; County
2015	4.2; 5.0	Municipal; County
2019	6.8; 7.6	Municipal; County

== See also ==
- Green party
- List of environmental organizations
