= Ingrid Liland =

Norwegian politician (born 1990)

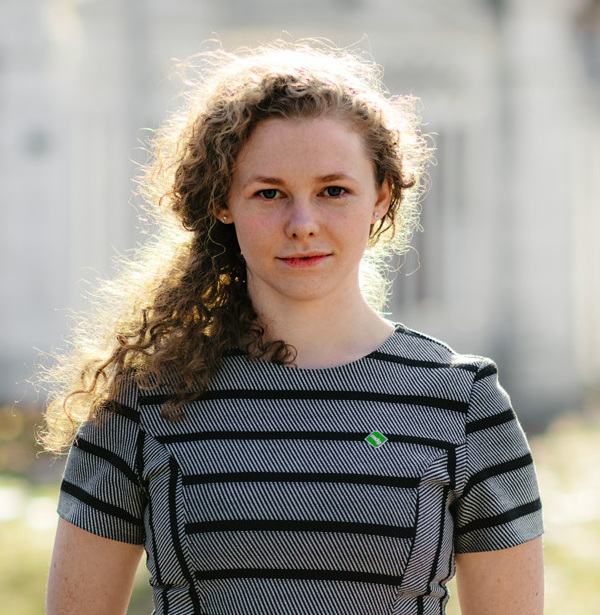
- Liland in 2017

Member of the Storting
- Incumbent
- Assumed office 1 October 2025
- Constituency: Oslo

Second Deputy Leader of the Green Party
- Incumbent
- Assumed office 8 May 2022
- Leader: Une Bastholm; Arild Hermstad
- Preceded by: Kriss Rokkan Iversen

Personal details
- Born: 27 January 1990 (age 36) Nærøysund Municipality, Nord-Trøndelag, Norway
- Party: Green

Ingrid Liland (born 27 January 1990) is a Norwegian politician who was elected member of the Storting in 2025. A member of the Green Party, she has served as its second deputy leader since 2022.

== Political career ==
=== Party politics ===
She was elected as the second deputy leader of her party at the 2022 convention, succeeding Kriss Rokkan Iversen. Along with the rest of the leadership, she was re-elected at the 2024 convention.
