= Sigmund Kvaløy Setreng =

Norwegian philosopher (1934–2014)

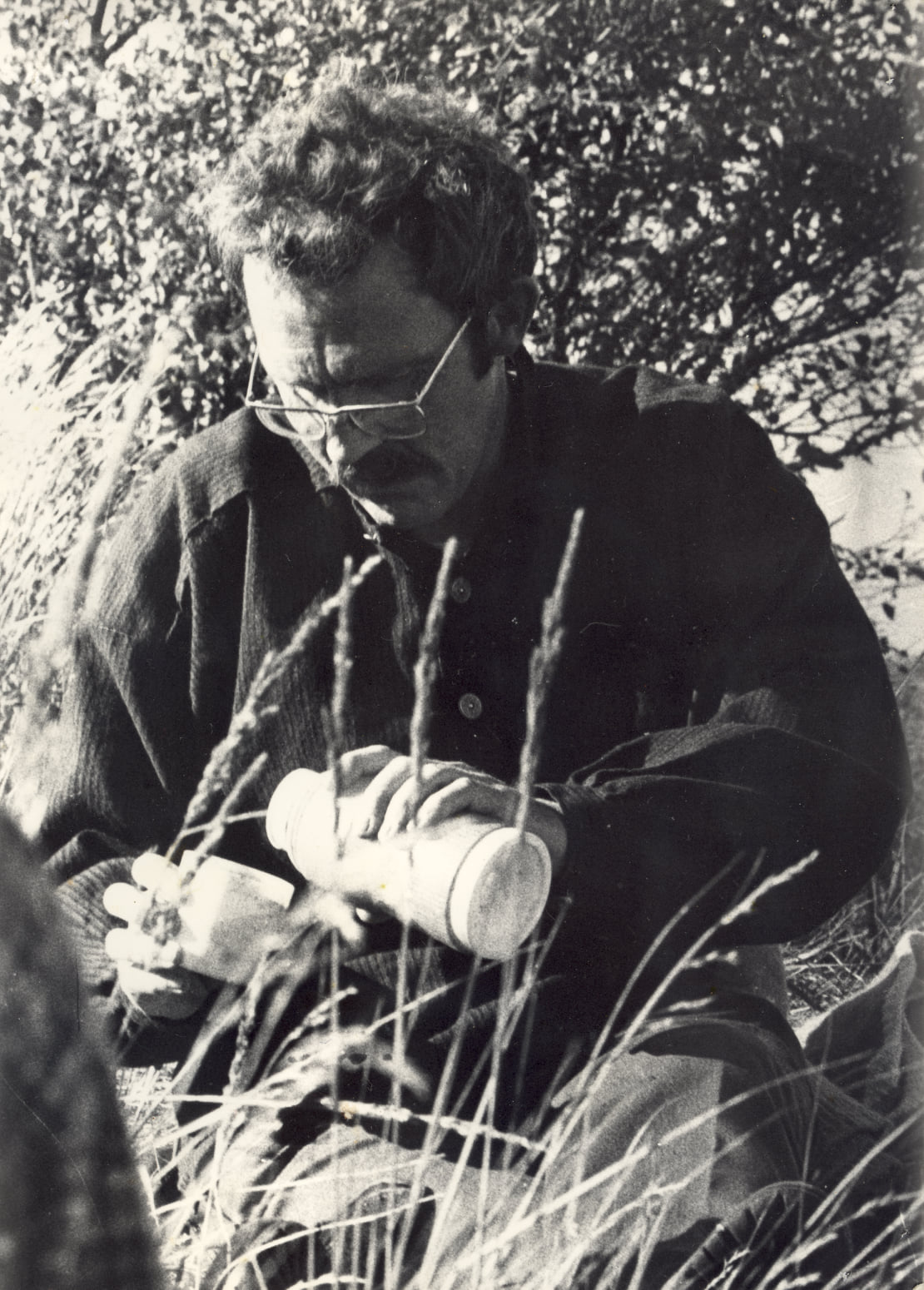
- c. 1976
- Born: 20 September 1934; Trondheim, Norway
- Died: 27 May 2014 (aged 79)
- Occupations: Philosopher, illustrator, mountain climber, environmental activist and politician.

Sigmund Kvaløy Setreng (20 September 1934 – 27 May 2014) was a Norwegian philosopher, illustrator, mountain climber, environmental activist and politician. He was born in Trondheim. Among his publications are Musikk-kritikk og kommunikasjon from 1966, Økokrise, natur og menneske from 1976, and Mangfold og tid. Pyramide-mennesket ved skillevegen: System, frihet eller kaos? from 2001.

== Personal life ==
Setreng was born in Trondheim to schoolteachers Anders Kvaløy and Kirsti Sætereng, and grew up in Lom Municipality. He married nurse Kirsten Rogndokken in 1962. In 1981 he changed his name from Sigmund Kvaløy to Sigmund Sætereng, and further to Setreng in 1983.

== Career ==
Having passed examen artium in 1955, Setreng underwent technical training at Kjevik with the Royal Norwegian Air Force, and subsequently worked with maintenance of aircraft at Gardermoen Air Station. Through reading of Laozi and Kafka, he developed an interest in philosophy, and from 1958 he started studying at the University of Oslo. Interested in nature and environmental protection, and influenced by Arne Næss, Peter Wessel Zapffe and Henri Bergson, he eventually developed his own original variant of ecophilosophy. He graduated as cand.mag. in 1966, with the thesis, Musikk-kritikk og kommunikasjon. In 1970 he took actively part in protests against development of the waterfall of Mardalsfossen. An able mountain climber, he travelled to Rolwaling Himal to study the Sherpa people native to Nepal and the Himalayas, and fascinated by their way of thinking, he converted to Buddhism. In the late 1970s he was engaged in the Alta controversy and in protests against construction of the Innerdalsvatnet dam in the Orkla River.

== Selected works ==
- Musikk-kritikk og kommunikasjon. 1966., thesis
- Økofilosofisk fragment. Kompleksitet og komplikasjon. 1972.
- Økokrise, natur og menneske. En innføring i økofilosofi og økopolitikk. 1976.
- Naturens nei. Om EU, frihandel og økologisk kaos. 1994.
- Fra mangfold til enfold. 1998.
- Mangfold og tid. Pyramide-mennesket ved skillevegen: System, frihet eller kaos?. 2001.
