= Hanna Marcussen =

Norwegian politician

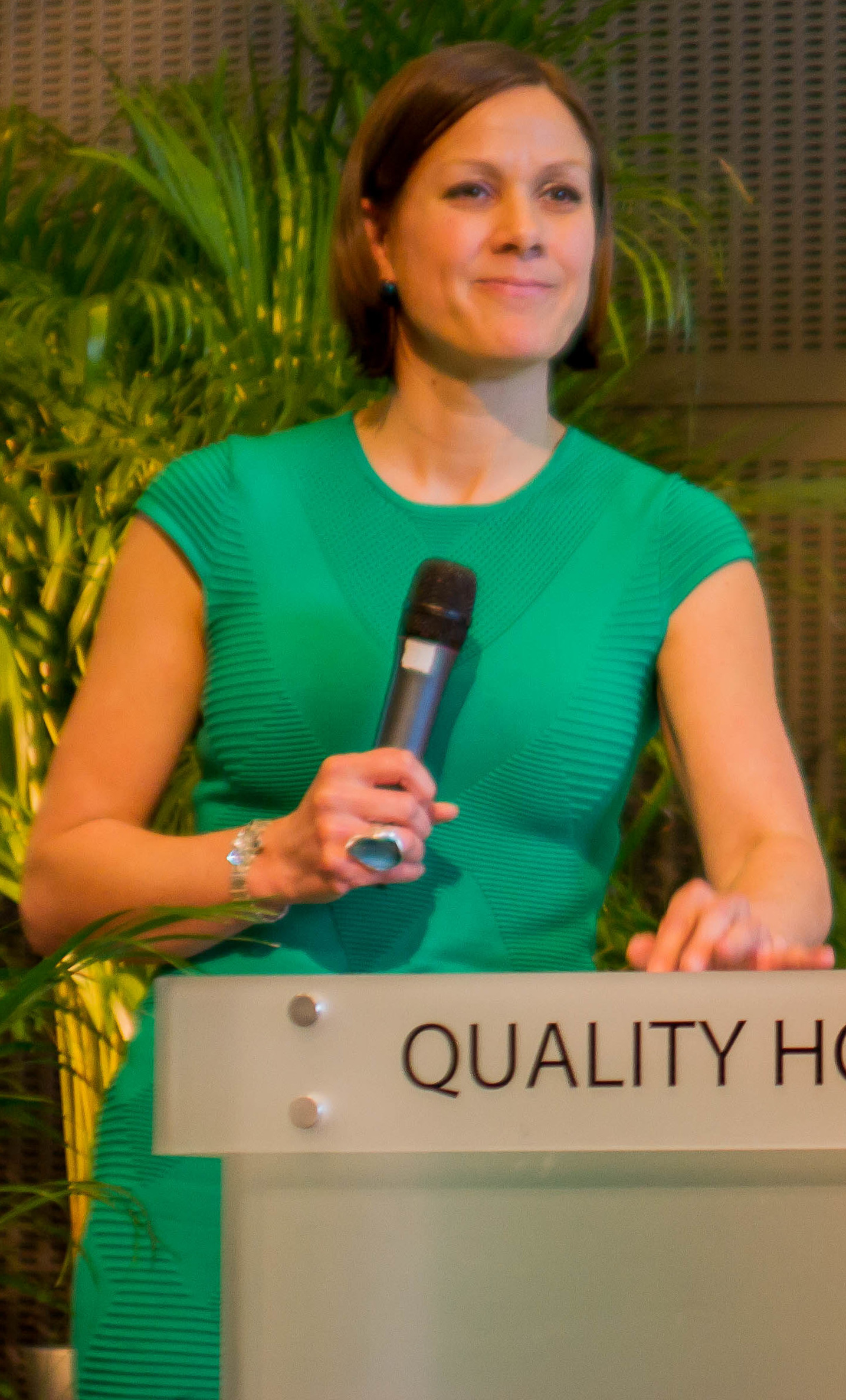
- Hanna Marcussen in 2016

Oslo City Commissioner for Urban Development
- In office 21 October 2015 – 25 October 2023
- Governing Mayor: Raymond Johansen
- Preceded by: Bård Folke Frederiksen
- Succeeded by: James Stove Lorentzen

Oslo City Commissioner for Transport and the Environment
- Acting
- In office 18 June 2021 – 24 June 2021
- Governing Mayor: Raymond Johansen
- Preceded by: Lan Marie Berg
- Succeeded by: Siri Hellvin Stav

Spokesperson for the Green Party
- In office 2008–2014 Serving with Harald A. Nissen
- Preceded by: Birte Simonsen
- Succeeded by: Hilde Opoku

Manager of Bergfald Environmental Advisors
- In office 2014–2015

Personal details
- Born: 4 September 1977 (age 49) Arendal, Aust-Agder, Norway
- Party: Green Party
- Education: University of Oslo

Hanna Elise Marcussen (born 4 September 1977) is a Norwegian politician for the Green Party. She served as Oslo's City Commissioner for Urban Development from 2015 to 2023.

== Career ==
She served as national spokesperson for the Norwegian Green Party in the years 2008–2014. She was also elected as a deputy member of Oslo city council in 2011 and 2015.

In November 2012, she lost a fight against Rasmus Hansson for the top spot on the party's ballot for the 2013 Norwegian parliamentary election. She instead got the top spot on the party's ballot in Rogaland in February 2013. Hansson was elected in Oslo, and Marcussen failed to win a Rogaland seat.

From 2014 to 2015, she was the manager of Bergfald Environmental Advisors.

In 2015, she was appointed as the City Commissioner of Urban Planning in the new city government of Raymond Johansen.

Following Lan Marie Berg's resignation following a confidence vote against her, Marcussen succeeded her in an interim capacity as commissioner for transport and the environment, before the new cabinet was presented on 24 June 2021. Marcussen was then succeeded by Sirin Hellvin Stav.

In 2022, Marcussen announced that she would not seek re-election at the 2023 local elections. She went on parental leave in May 2023, and Arild Hermstad assumed her duties until after the election.

== Education ==
Marcussen is a qualified archaeologist from the University of Oslo.

== External resources ==
Green Party (homesite)

Political offices
Preceded by Bård Folke Fredriksen	Oslo City Commissioner of Urban Planning; 2015–2023	Succeeded by James Stove Lorentzen
