= Rasmus Hansson =

Norwegian politician (born 1954)

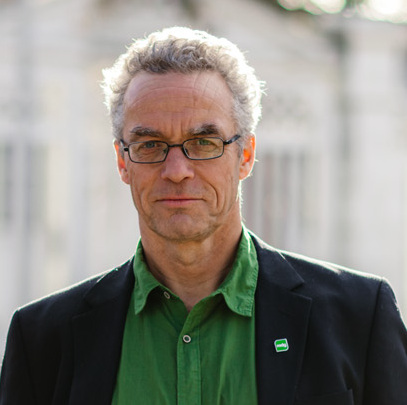
- Rasmus Hansson in 2017

Spokesperson for the Green Party
- In office 12 April 2016 – 12 May 2018 Serving with Une Bastholm (2016–2018)
- Preceded by: Hilde Opoku
- Succeeded by: Arild Hermstad

Member of the Storting
- In office 1 October 2021 – 30 September 2025
- Constituency: Oslo
- In office 1 October 2013 – 30 September 2017
- Constituency: Oslo

Personal details
- Born: Rasmus Johan Michael Hansson; 4 September 1954 (age 72) Bærum, Akershus, Norway
- Party: The Greens
- Children: 3
- Parent: Knut M. Hansson (father)
- Occupation: Biologist; Civil Servant; Environmental activist

Military service
- Allegiance: Norway
- Branch/service: Norwegian Army

Rasmus Johan Michael Hansson (born 4 September 1954) is a Norwegian biologist, civil servant, environmental activist and a former national spokesperson for the Green Party. He led the Norwegian chapter of World Wide Fund for Nature from 2000 to 2012. In 2013, he was elected to the Parliament of Norway as the first representative for the Green Party.

Hansson was born in Bærum, and grew up in Oslo. His father was the actor Knut Mørch Hansson of the Trondheim family Hansson which includes several businessmen and lawyers.

== Early life ==
In October 1976 he and two other (Harald Hjort and Knut Are Tvedt) built a dam over the creek in front of the entrance of present-day Norwegian Water Resources and Energy Directorate. (This resulted in their ironic press release being printed by Aftenposten, under the title "Vandalism on power facilities at Middelthunsfallene": "Upon inspection of the facilities on 23 October partial destruction due to vandalism, was confirmed. The dam has been removed and the water is now running its original course - of no use to society.")

== Activism resulting in imprisonment ==
As a student he was among the environmental activists that protested the construction of a hydroelectric power plant in the Alta river in Finnmark during the Alta controversy. He and a fellow student (Jørn Thomassen) were convicted of sitting down on a road meant for "construction traffic". In court he was sentenced for civil disobedience, and he spent 30 days in Oslo kretsfengsel. In 2014 Aftenposten said that "The fines, in the order of [Norwegian] kroner ten thousand were too high for the students so they both chose the option of having themselves imprisoned for a few weeks. It felt okay. Because they regretted nothing."

== Career ==
Hansson has a Cand. real degree in biology from the Norwegian University of Science and Technology. He wrote a master's thesis (hovedfag) on polar bears.

He has worked as an adviser in the Norwegian and been a researcher for Norwegian Polar Institute and Norad. He led the Norwegian chapter of World Wide Fund for Nature from 2000 to 2012. Since 2012 he has been leading the Oslo Centre for Interdisciplinary Environmental and Social Research (CIENS).

== Parliamentary election ==
In the 2013 Norwegian parliamentary election Hansson candidated for the first spot on the party's Oslo ballot against the party's national spokesperson Hanna Marcussen and narrowly won. The party got 5.6% of the votes in Oslo in the election 9 September 2013 and Hansson was the only person from the Green Party who got a seat in the parliament as the national result was 2.8% and below the 4% threshold for levelling seats. It was the first time that the Greens got a representative in the parliament.

He was re-elected to the Storting following the 2021 election, along with party leader Une Aina Bastholm and Lan Marie Berg. The party overall received 3.9% of the vote, just shy of the 4% threshold for levelling seats. In April 2024, he announced that he wouldn't seek re-election in 2025.

== Political priorities ==
Hansson argues that consumption in Norway needs to be reduced in order to cope with the environmental challenges. During the 2013 campaign for the Greens he suggested that it would be a good idea if the economic welfare was brought back to the level it was in the 1980s, about half of the current level. Among his political priorities are more focus on wind power and saving the polar bear.

== Family ==
He resides in Bærumsmarka.

He is married and has three children.
