= Lan Marie Berg =

Norwegian politician (born 1987)

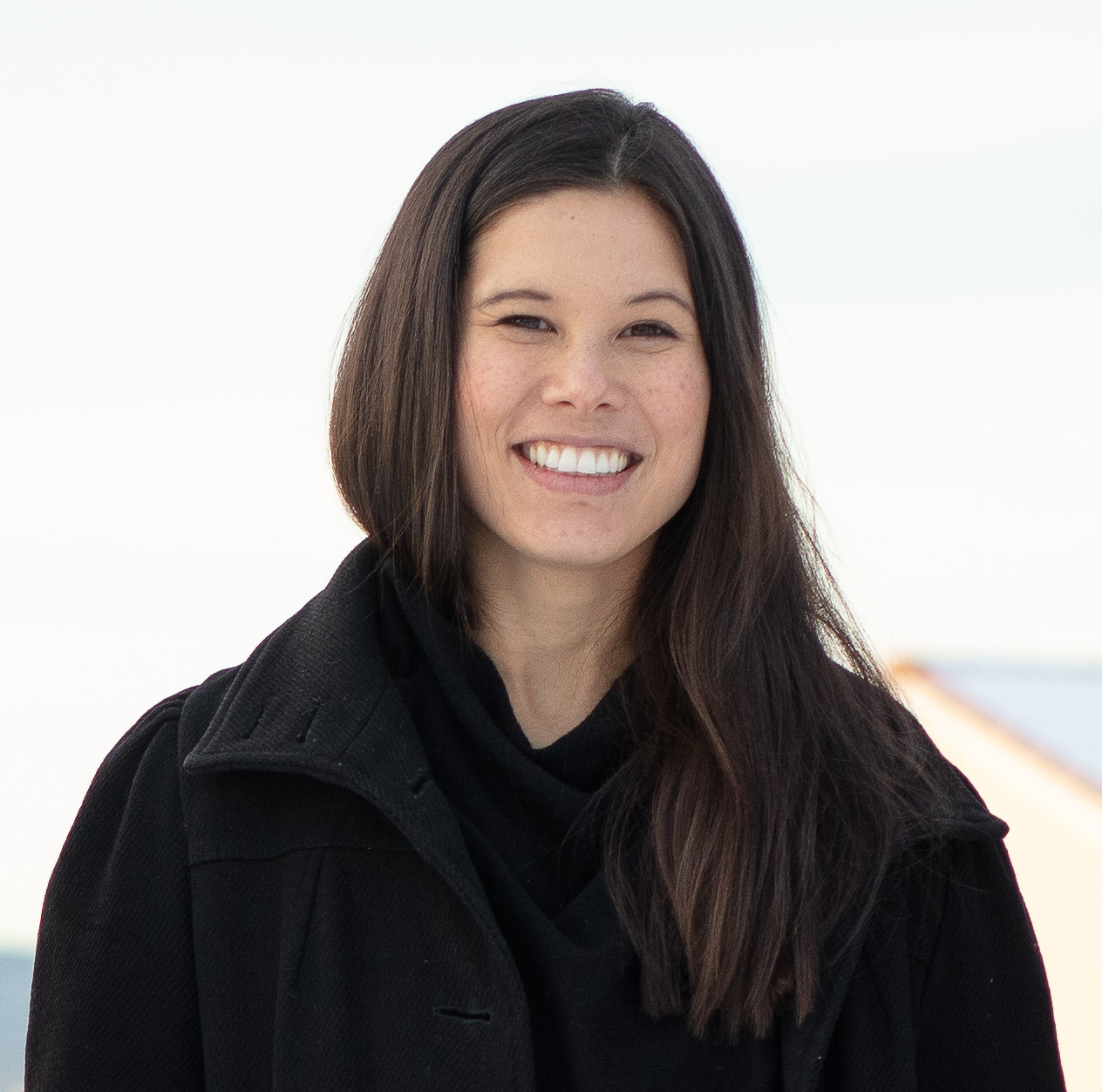
- Lan Marie Berg in 2019

First Deputy Leader of the Green Party
- In office 26 November 2022 – 9 May 2025
- Leader: Arild Hermstad
- Preceded by: Arild Hermstad
- Succeeded by: Jonas Maas Nilsen

Member of the Storting
- In office 1 October 2021 – 30 September 2025
- Constituency: Oslo

Oslo City Commissioner for Transport and the Environment
- In office 21 October 2015 – 18 June 2021
- Governing Mayor: Raymond Johansen
- Preceded by: Guri Melby
- Succeeded by: Sirin Hellvin Stav

Personal details
- Born: 4 March 1987 (age 39) Oslo, Norway
- Party: Green Party
- Spouse: Eivind Trædal (m. 2018)
- Children: 1

Lan Marie Nguyen Berg (born 4 March 1987) is a Norwegian politician from the Green Party. She served as a Member of Parliament for Oslo from 2021 to 2025 and was one of the party's deputy leaders from 2022 to 2025. Prior to this, Berg held the position of Oslo City Commissioner for Transport and Environment from 2015 to 2021, stepping down after a confidence vote.

== Education ==
Berg was born in Oslo. She has a master's degree from the Center for Development and the Environment at the University of Oslo. She wrote her master's thesis on the use of solar power in a Kenyan village.

== Career ==
Berg joined the environmental organisation Spire in 2009, and worked for the Oslo Mela Festival. She was also part of an environmental blog collective called "Grønne jenter" (English: Green Girls), part of a group of ten women who wrote about environmentally conscious fashion, food and lifestyle. Berg was first elected to the Oslo city council in the 2015 Norwegian local elections, after being nominated as the first candidate for the Green Party in Oslo in September 2014.

On 10 October 2022, she was designated first deputy leader of her party, with Arild Hermstad as leader. She was formally elected at the extraordinary congress on 26 November. She stepped down as deputy leader in May 2025 and was succeeded by Jonas Maas Nilsen.

=== Parliament ===
Berg was elected to the Storting at the 2021 election. There she sat on the Standing Committee on Energy and the Environment from 2021 to 2022, where she also was first vice chair. From 2022, she sat on the Standing Committee on Finance and Economic Affairs and the Standing Committee on Scrutiny and Constitutional Affairs from 2023. Also from 2022, she was a member of the Enlarged Committee on Foreign Affairs and Defence.

In May 2024, she announced that she would not be seeking re-election at the 2025 election.

=== Oslo City Commissioner ===
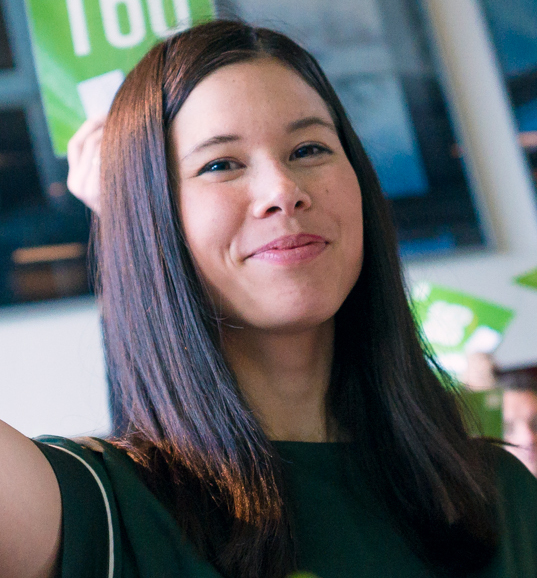
Lan Marie Berg in 2016

Following the 2015 local elections, she was appointed city commissioner for transport and the environment and deputy governing mayor in Raymond Johansen's cabinet.

In the 2019 Norwegian local elections she was again nominated as the Green Party in Oslo's first candidate. She received the most votes of all candidates in the party.

Berg was on parental leave from 2 January to 3 August 2020, and her duties as city commissioner was covered by the party's deputy leader, Arild Hermestad.

In 2020, the Progress Party and the People's Action No to More Road Tolls party submitted a motion of no-confidence against Berg for violations of the Working Environment Act since 2013 and withholding information from the city council. The motion did not pass.

In February 2021, she announced that she intended to create a zero-emissions zone within the city where petrol and diesel cars would be prohibited.

In May, the Oslo Police announced that they would be investigating a number of threats made against her online after she had made a Facebook post expressing solidarity with Gaza during the 2021 Israel–Palestine crisis.

In June, the Oslo City Council passed a motion of no-confidence against her over a controversy concerning the budget of the under construction new water supply for the city. She stayed on in interim capacity until governing mayor Raymond Johansen was given the task to form a new council cabinet. Berg resigned on 18 June and was replaced by Hanna Marcussen in acting capacity. Her permanent successor was Sirin Helvin Stav. She was succeeded by Einar Wilhelmsen as deputy governing mayor.

== Personal life ==
Berg's father, Khanh Thanh Nguyen, moved from Vietnam to Norway as a 13 year old in 1968, after becoming paralyzed after a fall. Her mother, Mari Ann Berg, is a local politician for the Socialist Left Party in Oppegård (now Nordre Follo).

She married fellow party member Eivind Trædal in July 2018. They welcomed their first child, a daughter, in May 2019.
