= 2029 =

2029 in various calendars
- Gregorian calendar: 2029; MMXXIX
- Ab urbe condita: 2782
- Armenian calendar: 1478; ԹՎ ՌՆՀԸ
- Assyrian calendar: 6779
- Baháʼí calendar: 185–186
- Balinese saka calendar: 1950–1951
- Bengali calendar: 1435–1436
- Berber calendar: 2979
- British Regnal year: N/A
- Buddhist calendar: 2573
- Burmese calendar: 1391
- Byzantine calendar: 7537–7538
- Chinese calendar: 戊申年 (Earth Monkey); 4726 or 4519 — to — 己酉年 (Earth Rooster); 4727 or 4520
- Coptic calendar: 1745–1746
- Discordian calendar: 3195
- Ethiopian calendar: 2021–2022
- Hebrew calendar: 5789–5790
- Hindu calendars
- Vikram Samvat: 2085–2086
- Shaka Samvat: 1950–1951
- Kali Yuga: 5129–5130
- Holocene calendar: 12029
- Igbo calendar: 1029–1030
- Iranian calendar: 1407–1408
- Islamic calendar: 1450–1451
- Japanese calendar: Reiwa 11 (令和１１年)
- Javanese calendar: 1962–1963
- Juche calendar: 118
- Julian calendar: Gregorian minus 13 days
- Korean calendar: 4362
- Minguo calendar: ROC 118 民國118年
- Nanakshahi calendar: 561
- Thai solar calendar: 2572
- Tibetan calendar: ས་ཕོ་སྤྲེ་ལོ་ (male Earth-Monkey); 2155 or 1774 or 1002 — to — ས་མོ་བྱ་ལོ་ (female Earth-Bird); 2156 or 1775 or 1003
- Unix time: 1861920000 – 1893455999

2029 (MMXXIX) will be a common year starting on Monday of the Gregorian calendar, the 2029th year of the Common Era (CE) and Anno Domini (AD) designations, the 29th year of the 3rd millennium and the 21st century, and the 10th and last year of the 2020s decade.

== Predicted and scheduled events ==
- March 10–17 – The 2029 Special Olympics World Winter Games are scheduled to be held in Switzerland.
- March 25 – If not triggered earlier, the next German federal election will occur no later than this date.
- April 13 – Asteroid 99942 Apophis, at 335 metres (1,100 feet) wide, will pass Earth less than 32,000 kilometres (20,000 miles) from Earth's surface: closer than geosynchronous satellites. When discovered, it was considered a serious threat to Earth, but since then refined predictions have ruled out any impact risk for the next 100 years. This will be the closest approach of an asteroid this size scientists have predicted.
- July 19 – 29 – The 2029 World Games will be held in Karlsruhe, Germany.
- August 15 – If not triggered earlier, the next United Kingdom general election will occur no later than this date.
- September 17 – If not triggered earlier, the 2029 Norwegian parliamentary election will occur no later than this date.
- October 10 – The 2029 World Horticultural Expo is scheduled to be opened in Nakhon Ratchasima, Thailand.
- October 14 – If not triggered earlier, the next Portuguese legislative election will occur no later than this date.
- October 15 – If not triggered earlier, the 46th Canadian federal election will occur no later than this date.
- October 20 - If not triggered earlier, the 2029 Indonesian presidential election will occur no later than this date.

=== Date unknown ===
- May – If not triggered earlier, the next Indian general election will occur no later than this month.
- June – If not triggered earlier, the next French legislative election will occur no later than this month.
- September - The 2029 World Athletics Championships, will be held in Nairobi, Kenya.
- ESA plans to launch the Ariel exoplanet telescope and Comet Interceptor.
- The Three Seas Initiative (3SI) estimates to end the Rail-2-Sea project by this year.
- Romania expects to have entered the eurozone by this year.
- The radio-transmitted digital time capsule "A Message from Earth" will reach its destination on the planet Gliese 581c.
- NASA's New Horizons spacecraft is expected to leave the Solar System.
- The 2029 Asian Winter Games will be held in Almaty, Kazakhstan.
- 343 Madison Avenue gets finished.
- The International Olympic Committee will elect the host city of the 2036 Summer Olympics.
