= Conservative (Norwegian political party) =

Norwegian political party

Conservative Konservativt
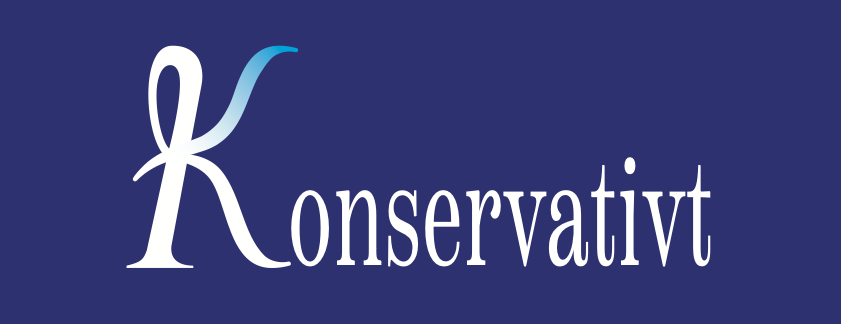
- Abbreviation: K
- Leader: Erik Selle
- Founded: 24 February 2011
- Split from: Christian Democratic Party
- Headquarters: Arendal
- Membership: 2,637 (2014)
- Ideology: Christian right Right-wing populism Euroscepticism Russophilia
- Political position: Right-wing
- Colours: Blue
- Storting: 0 / 169
- County councils: 1 / 728
- Municipal Councils: 14 / 10,781

Website
- www.konservativt.no

Conservative (Bokmål: Konservativt, Nynorsk: Konservativt, K) is a Christian right wing microparty in Norway founded in 2011. The party leader is Erik Selle.

The party has had marginal support in elections. It participated in its first parliamentary elections in 2013 and received 0.6% (17 731) of the votes. In the parliamentary elections in 2025 the party received 0.48% (15 503) of the votes.

== History ==
Formerly known as The Christians (Bokmål: Partiet De Kristne, Nynorsk: Partiet Dei Kristne, PDK), the party was formed when the Christian Democratic Party abolished its requirement that its representatives profess the Christian faith. The new party saw this as a major step in the "de-Christianization" of the Christian Democrats, and believed that the last six years of the Red–Green government had de-Christianized Norway.

The party participated in its first election for the 2011 local elections limited to the municipal council in Bømlo Municipality. They won 6.5% of the votes there, earning them two seats. Bømlo Municipality was selected to test support for the new party, with defected local Christian Democratic politicians heading their list. Some saw the party's founding meeting on the island of Moster in Bømlo as symbolic, as it was the original starting point of the Christianization of Norway by King Olaf Tryggvason a thousand years ago.

For the 2013 parliamentary election, the party gained additional support from philosopher Nina Karin Monsen, veteran Christian Democratic politician Anita Apelthun Sæle, and Visjon Norge televangelist Jan Hanvold. It received 0.6% of the national vote (17,731 votes), winning no seats but becoming second largest of the extra-parliamentary parties.

Before the 2015 local elections, the Christians drew some local politicians from the Christian Democrats as well as the Progress Party; the party had established a large number of new local chapters. The party managed to secure lists for the elections in 70 municipalities, as well as all the counties of Norway. Among the speakers at the party's national congress in May was the Israeli Greek Orthodox priest Gabriel Naddaf. The party won three municipal representatives in the election, one each in Bømlo Municipality, Vennesla Municipality and Karmøy Municipality.

In the 2019 Norwegian local elections, the party improved on their previous results, with a total of 10,423 votes (0,4% total), giving them six municipal council members and their first ever county council member in the Agder county elections.

On 5 November 2022, the party congress decided to change the party's name to Conservative.

== Ideology ==
The party considers its ideology to be built on Christian and "Judeo-Christian" values. It profiles itself as anti-abortion, promotes the traditional family and opposition to same-sex marriage, and in its foreign policy maintains strong support for Israel and Russia. The party claims to follow the line of former Christian Democrat leader Kåre Kristiansen. Unlike the Christian Democrats, the party supports cooperation with the Progress Party; the party has stated that it aims for participation in a coalition government together with the Progress and Conservative Party. In 2019, party leader Erik Selle expressed admiration for what he sees as a spiritual and cultural "renaissance" of Christian values in Putin's Russia.

== Foreign policy ==
Conservative has been described as the only "pro-Kremlin party" in Norway. In the wake of Russia's invasion of Ukraine in February 2022, the party has been criticized for promoting Russian propaganda. The party leader Erik Selle has stated that the West carries "a great deal of the responsibility" for Russia´s attack on Ukraine, and he has suggested that Russia gets to keep the illegally annexed Ukrainian regions of Luhansk, Donetsk and Crimea. While the party made a decision in May 2022 to support the Norwegian government's weapon deliveries to Ukraine, the party leadership has since then criticized arms support for Ukraine as "prolonging" and "escalating" the conflict, and being driven by the military-industrial complex in the West.

Critics and political analysts have pointed out several core logical contradictions and inconsistencies in the political arguments of Konservativt and its leader Erik Selle. While Selle frames his stance on the Ukraine war through the lens of strict "realpolitik" (political realism), critics note that his arguments directly clash with the deeply idealistic, value-driven framework he applies to other geopolitical conflicts—most notably concerning Israel and Western civilizational defense. Critics highlight three major inconsistencies in Selle's arguments.

1. The "realpolitik" of Russia vs. the idealism of Israel: Selle argues that the West must abandon "idealism" and accept "realities on the ground" in the Ukraine war. He frequently contends that NATO expansion and Western actions disregarded Russia's historical trauma and "red lines," effectively sharing blame for the conflict. Under this realist view, he has suggested that Ukraine should cede occupied territories (like Crimea) to secure a pragmatic peace, arguing that pushing back is an invitation to escalation. When discussing Israel and the Middle East, Selle completely discards "realpolitik". Instead of asking Israel to pragmatically accommodate the "red lines," historical traumas, or geopolitical demands of surrounding hostile neighbors (like Iran or regional proxy groups) to secure peace, he takes an uncompromising, idealistic, and biblically rooted stance on absolute state sovereignty, moral clarity, and historical right. Critics point out that forcing Ukraine to compromise its borders while demanding absolute sovereign integrity for Israel is a severe double standard.

2. National sovereignty vs. spheres of Influence: As a national-conservative party, Konservativt´s core domestic platform is built heavily on national sovereignty—protecting Norway from the overreach of globalist entities like the EU or the UN. However, its "realpolitik" argument regarding Ukraine effectively legitimizes the concept of "spheres of influence". By arguing that the West should have respected Russia’s "neighborhood" demands and halted NATO’s open-door policy, critics state that Conservative is actively subverting his own principle of national sovereignty. Under a true sovereignty model, Ukraine has an absolute, independent right to choose its own security alliances without seeking permission from a larger neighboring power.

3. Internal party rhetoric vs. official party stance: Critics, including former high-ranking members of the party, have documented a stark inconsistency between part leader Erik Selle’s public commentary and Konservativt’s official resolutions. To deflect accusations of being pro-Russian, Selle frequently points to an official 2022 party resolution that formally condemns the Russian invasion and supports Norwegian weapons aid to Ukraine. However, in his personal rhetoric, on his podcasts and alternative media appearances, Selle has consistently criticized Western weapons shipments as "escalatory," called for an end to anti-Russian sanctions to protect Norwegian business, and amplified arguments that parallel Kremlin talking points. Critics have labeled this as a tactical form of double communication using official party papers as a shield while actively preaching a "realpolitik" of appeasement. By treating Ukraine as a geographic buffer zone that must pragmatically compromise with a superpower, while treating other conflicts as absolute, black-and-white civilizational battles for survival, Selle’s critics argue his foreign policy lacks a cohesive philosophical foundation.

== Election results ==
=== Storting ===
| Election | Leader | Votes | % | Seats | +/– | Position | Status |
|---|---|---|---|---|---|---|---|
| 2013 | Terje Simonsen | 17,731 | 0.6% | 0 / 169 | New | 10th | Extra-parliamentary |
| 2017 | Erik Selle | 8,700 | 0.3% | 0 / 169 | 0 | ▼12th | Extra-parliamentary |
| 2021 | Erik Selle | 10,448 | 0.4% | 0 / 169 | 0 | 12th | Extra-parliamentary |
| 2025 | Erik Selle | 14,950 | 0.4% | 0 / 169 | 0 | ▼14th | Extra-parliamentary |
