= Next French election =

Next French election may refer to:

- Next French legislative election, to be held by June 2029
- 2026 French Senate election
- 2027 French presidential election
