= 2029 Norwegian parliamentary election =

- 10 or 17 September 2029

All 169 seats in the Storting 85 seats needed for a majority
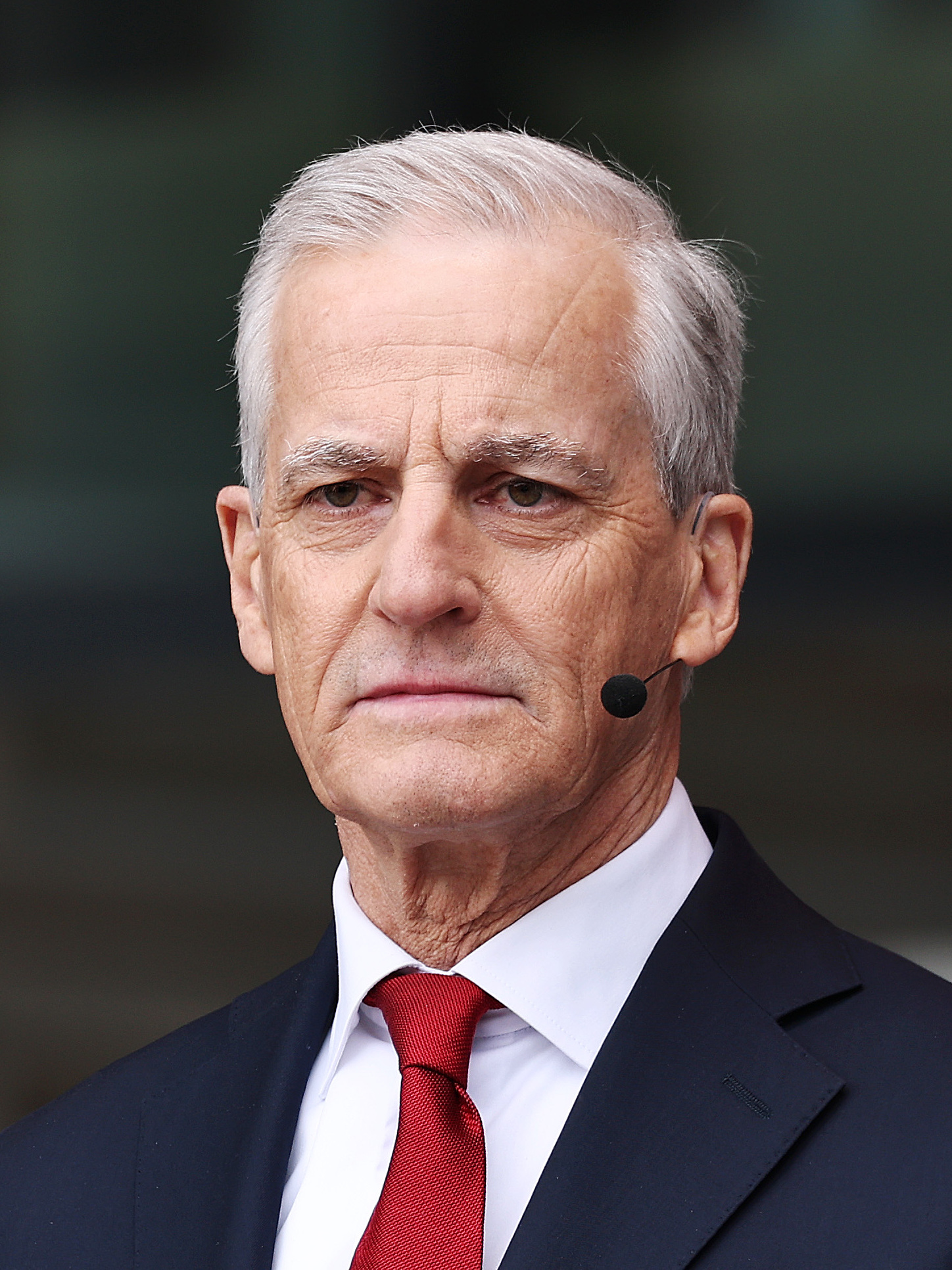

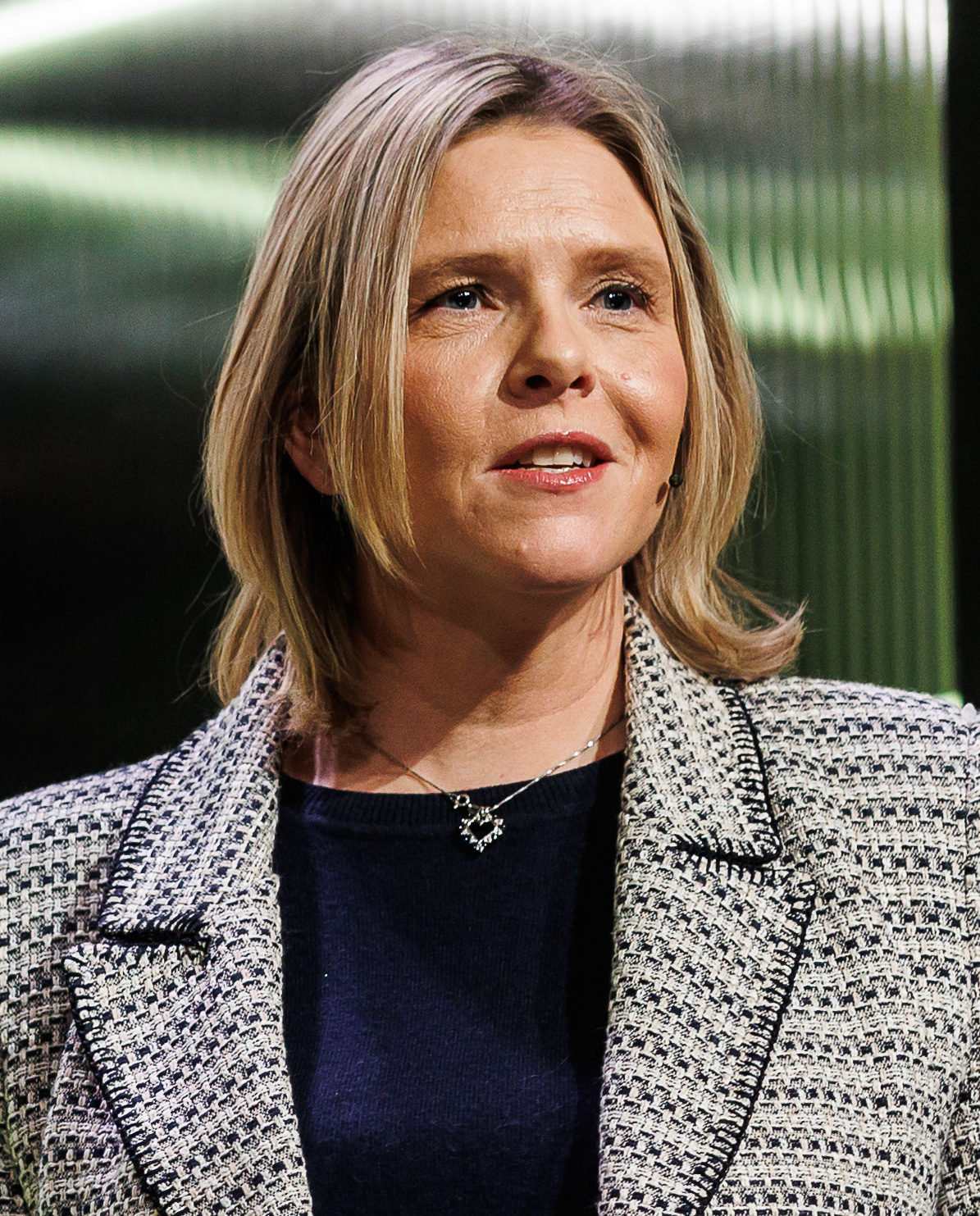

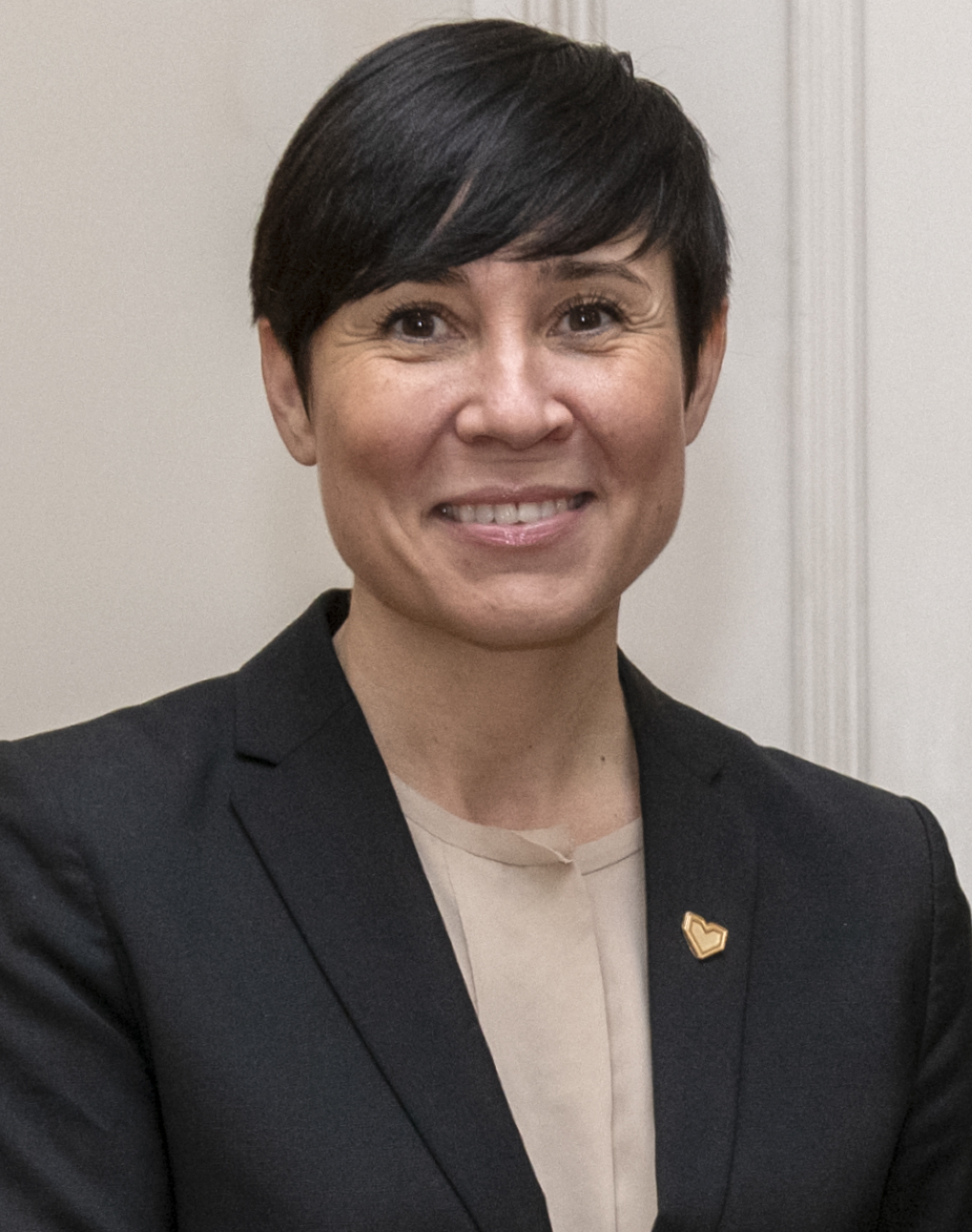

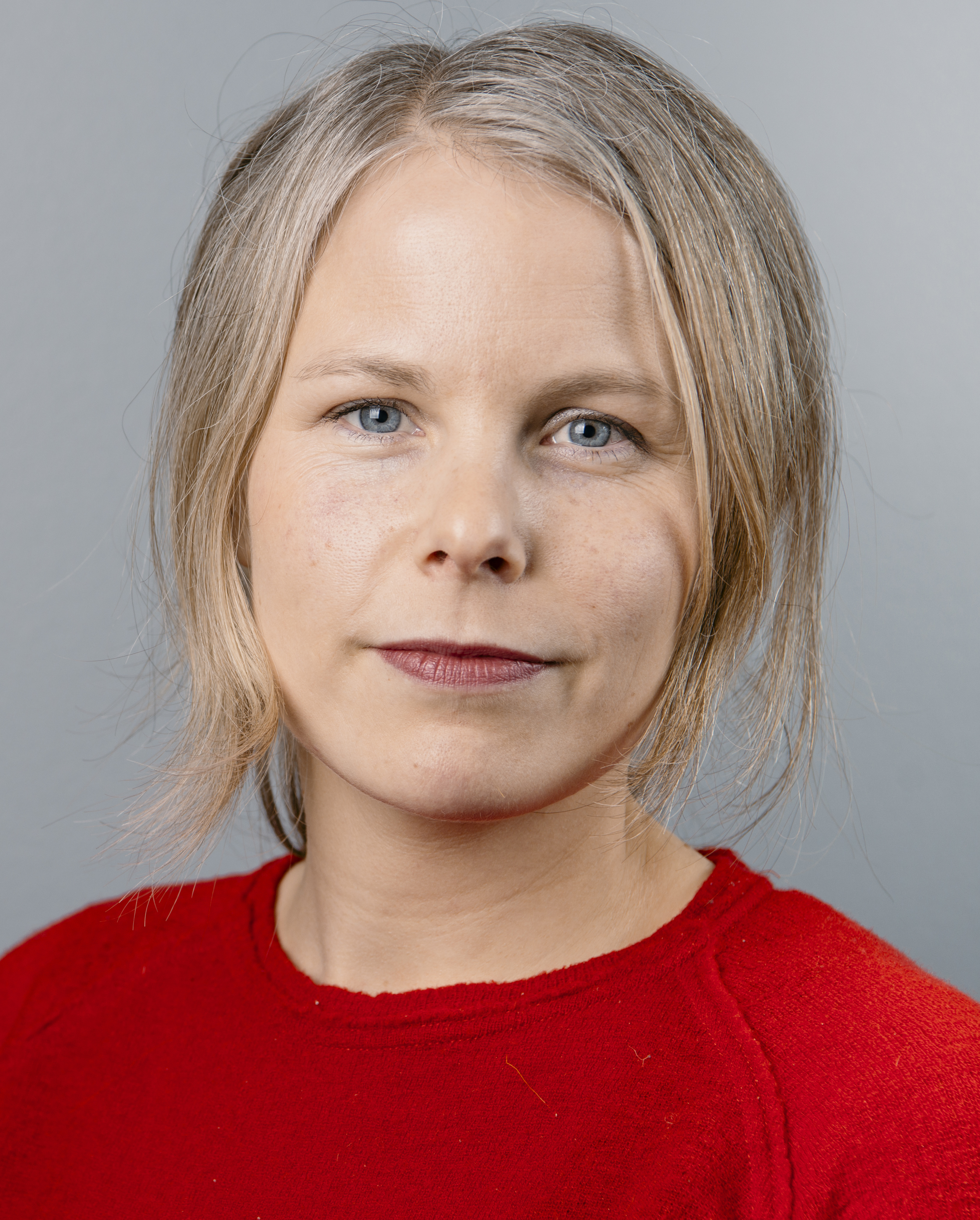

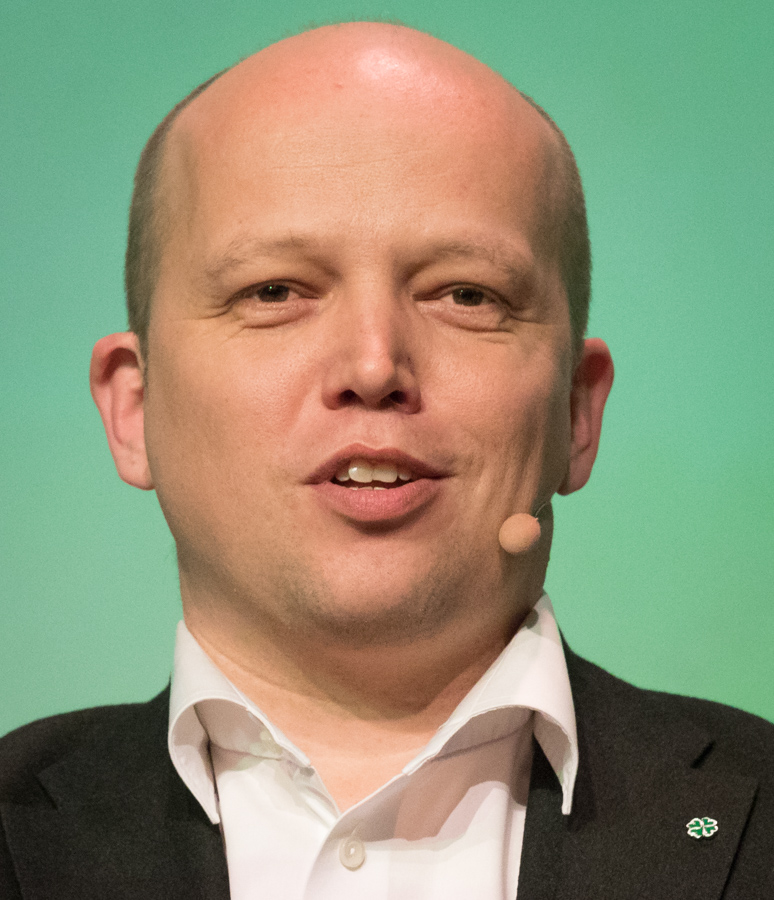

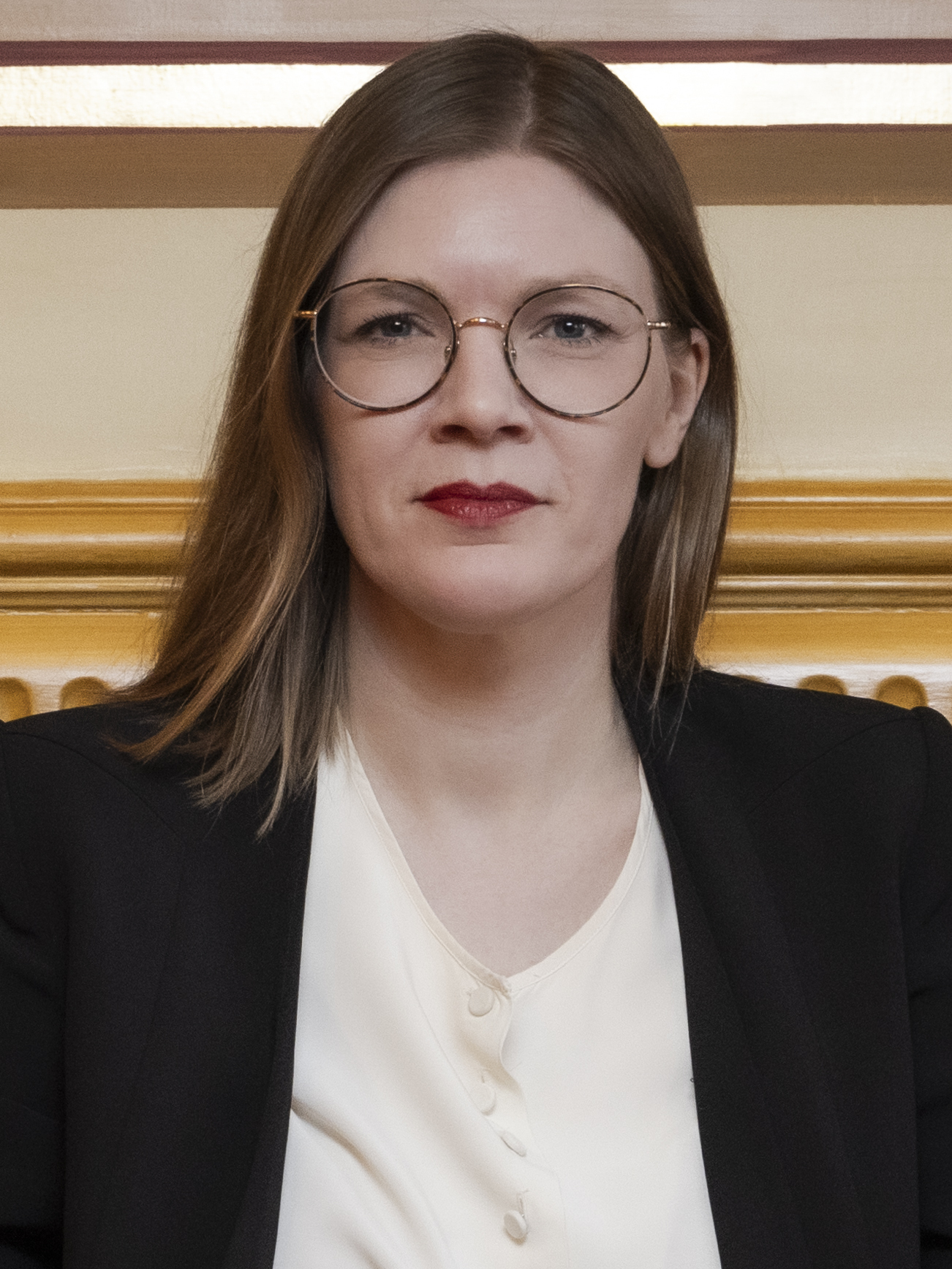

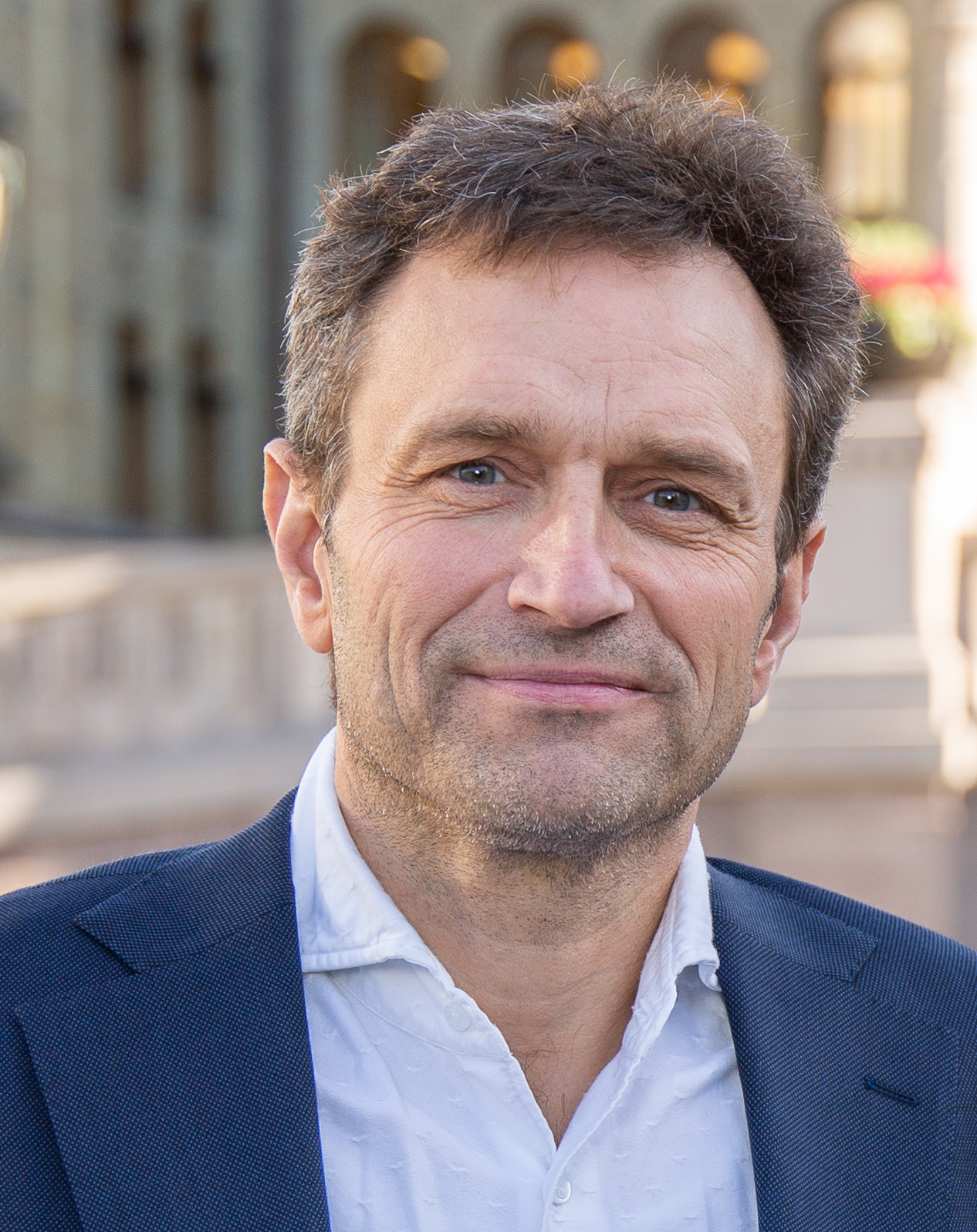

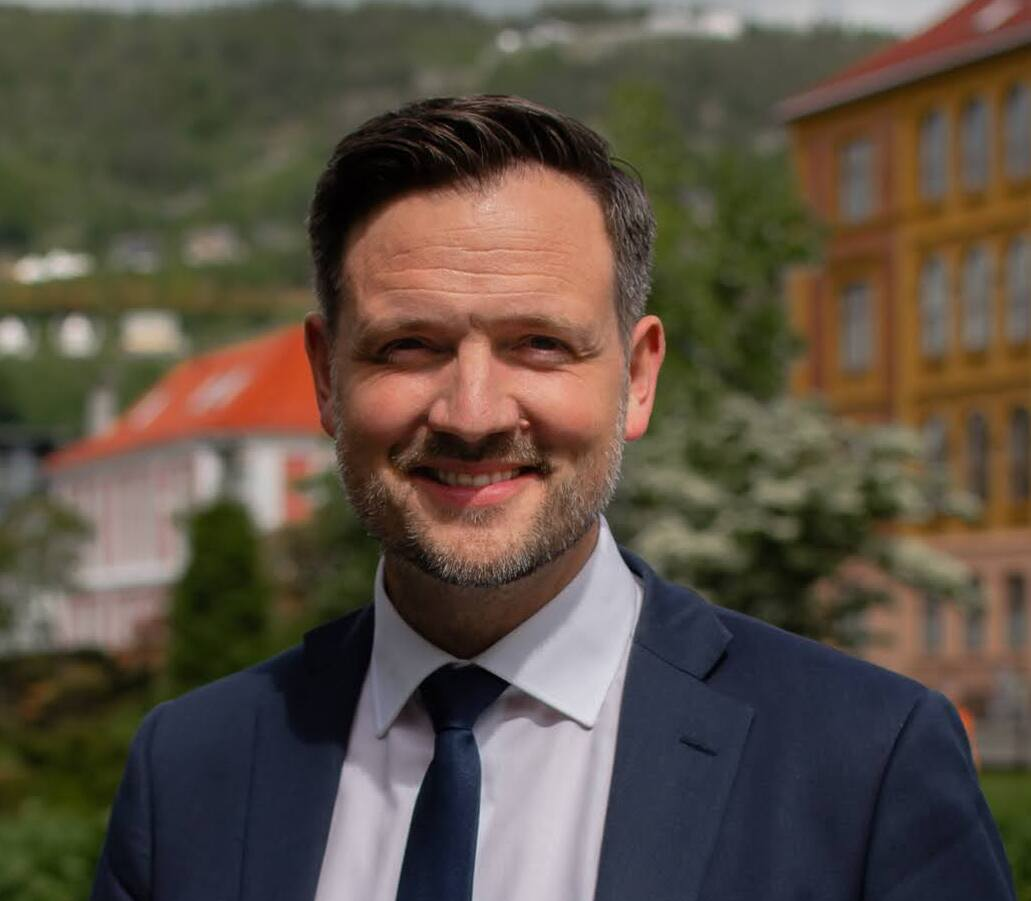

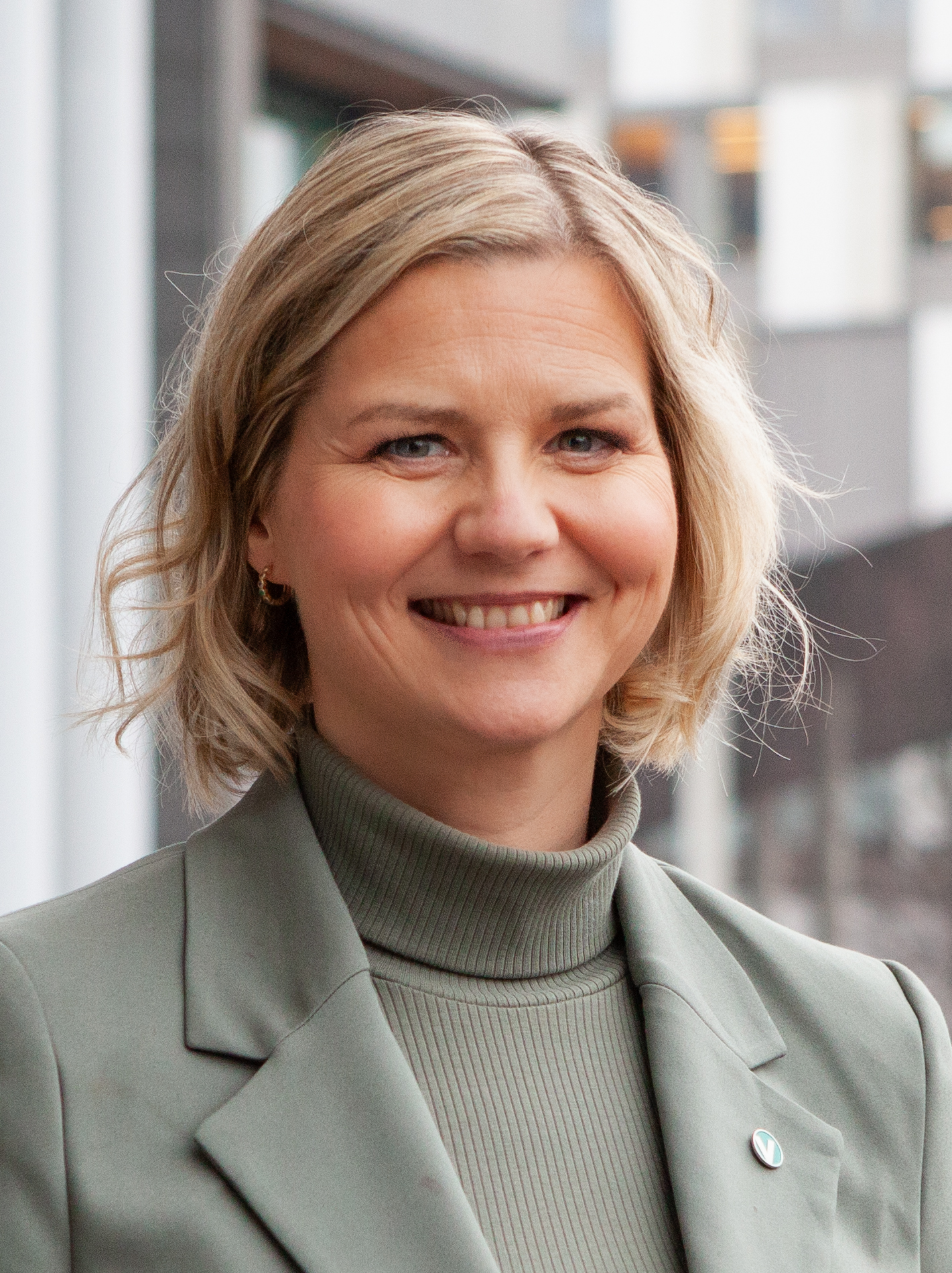
Leader	Jonas Gahr Støre	Sylvi Listhaug	Ine Eriksen Søreide
Party	Labour	Progress	Conservative
Leader since	14 June 2014	8 May 2021	14 February 2026
Leader's seat	Oslo	Møre og Romsdal	Oslo
Last election	53 seats, 28.02%	47 seats, 23.85%	24 seats, 14.65%
Leader	Kirsti Bergstø	Trygve Slagsvold Vedum	Marie Sneve Martinussen
Party	Socialist Left	Centre	Red
Leader since	18 March 2023	7 April 2014	24 May 2024
Leader's seat	Akershus	Hedmark	Akershus
Last election	9 seats, 5.63%	9 seats, 5.59%	9 seats, 5.32%
Leader	Arild Hermstad	Dag-Inge Ulstein	Guri Melby
Party	Green	Christian; Democratic	Liberal
Leader since	26 November 2022	22 August 2024	26 September 2020
Leader's seat	Oslo		Oslo
Last election	8 seats, 4.74%%	7 seats, 4.20%	3 seats, 3.69%
Incumbent Prime Minister
Jonas Gahr Støre
Labour

Parliamentary elections will be held in September 2029 to elect representatives to Norway's parliament, the Storting, for the period of 2029–2033.

== Electoral system ==
Norwegian parliamentary elections are held using party-list proportional representation in 19 multi-member constituencies based on the pre-2018 counties of Norway. To determine the apportionment of the 169 seats amongst the 19 counties, a two-tier formula is used, based on population and geographic size. Each inhabitant counts one point, while each square kilometer counts 1.8 points. Each constituency is guaranteed 4 seats.

150 of the seats (all but one in each constituency) are constituency seats. These are awarded based on the election results in each constituency, and are unaffected by results in other counties. Nineteen of the seats (one for each constituency) are levelling seats, awarded to parties above 4% of the national vote. A modification of the Sainte-Lague method, where the first quotient for each party is calculated using a divisor of 1.4 instead of 1, is used to allocate both the constituency and leveling seats. A party must cross the electoral threshold of 4% of the national vote in order to win levelling seats but may still win constituency seats even if it fails to reach this threshold. If a party wins more constituency seats than it is entitled to seats overall based on its national vote share, those additional seats are kept, with the number of seats won by other parties being reduced. The system for apportioning seats to constituencies is biased in favour of rural areas since the area of the county is a factor, but the system of compensation seats reduces the effect this has on the number of seats won by each party.

== Political parties ==
=== Parliamentary parties ===
The table below lists political parties elected to the Storting in the 2025 parliamentary election.

Name		Ideology	Position	Leader	2025 result	
Name		Ideology	Position	Leader	Votes (%)	Seats
Ap	Labour Party; Arbeiderpartiet	Social democracy	Centre-left	Jonas Gahr Støre	28.0%	53 / 169
FrP	Progress Party; Fremskrittspartiet	Right-wing populism	Right-wing to far-right	Sylvi Listhaug	23.8%	47 / 169
H	Conservative Party; Høyre	Liberal conservatism	Centre-right	Ine Eriksen Søreide	14.6%	24 / 169
SV	Socialist Left Party; Sosialistisk Venstreparti	Socialism	Left-wing	Kirsti Bergstø	5.6%	9 / 169
Sp	Centre Party; Senterpartiet	Agrarianism	Centre	Trygve Slagsvold Vedum	5.6%	9 / 169
R	Red Party; Rødt	Marxism	Left-wing to far-left	Marie Sneve Martinussen	5.3%	9 / 169
MDG	Green Party; Miljøpartiet De Grønne	Green politics	Centre-left	Arild Hermstad	4.7%	8 / 169
KrF	Christian Democratic Party; Kristelig Folkeparti	Christian democracy	Centre-right	Dag-Inge Ulstein	4.2%	7 / 169
V	Liberal Party; Venstre	Liberalism	Centre to centre-right	Guri Melby	3.7%	3 / 169

== Opinion polls ==
This section includes national voter intention polls listed on the Poll of Polls website. The projected seat distribution for each poll, as listed on the website, is shown below the percentages. 85 seats are needed for a majority.

=== 2026 ===
Polling execution				Parties											Blocs		
Polling firm	Fieldwork date	Sample size	Resp.	Red					Blue				Others	Lead	Red	Blue	Lead
Polling firm	Fieldwork date	Sample size	Resp.	R	SV	MDG	Ap	Sp	V	KrF	H	FrP	Others	Lead	Red	Blue	Lead
InFact	2 Nov	1,181	—N/a	9.1; 16	5.7; 8	3.8; 3	21.7; 42	4.8; 10	3.5; 2	3.8; 3	11.7; 21	34.2; 64	1.7; 0	12.5; 22	45.1; 79	53.2; 90	8.1; 11
Verian	26–30 Oct	983	—N/a	8.1; 13	5.7; 9	4.1; 6	22.9; 44	5.4; 9	4.0; 6	2.7; 1	13.1; 21	32.2; 60	1.7; 0 PP 0.1; ND 0.5; INP 0.2; K 0.2	9.3; 16	46.2; 81	52.0; 88	5.8; 7
Opinion	19–23 Oct	1,000	77.4	6.7; 12	4.2; 7	4.3; 8	20.6; 39	5.7; 10	3.3; 2	3.3; 1	12.5; 22	37.6; 68	1.8; 0	17.0; 29	41.5; 76	56.7; 93	15.2; 17
Norstat	21 Oct (Note: Date of publication)	1,000	—N/a	8.8; 16	5.1; 9	4.2; 7	22.5; 43	5.1; 9	3.7; 3	3.1; 1	13.1; 23	31.6; 58	2.6; 0 PP 0.3; ND 0.8; INP 0.3; K 0.4	9.1; 15	45.7; 84	51.5; 85	5.8; 1
Respons Analyse	7–12 Oct	1,000	81.0	7.9; 13	4.3; 7	4.1; 6	21.0; 39	4.9; 8	3.9; 3	4.1; 6	14.4; 23	33.9; 64	1.5; 0 PP 0.1; ND 0.7; INP 0.1; K 0.3	12.9; 25	42.2; 73	56.3; 96	14.1; 23
Opinion	5–10 Oct	1,000	79.0	9.2; 17	4.2; 8	3.4; 3	22.3; 42	5.3; 10	3.0; 2	3.5; 3	12.8; 24	32.7; 60	3.6; 0 PP 0.8; ND 0.4; K 0.2	10.4; 18	44.4; 80	52.0; 89	7.6; 9
Norfakta	6–7 Oct	1,000	80.0	6.2; 10	5.5; 9	4.5; 7	21.2; 41	6.2; 10	3.3; 2	4.0; 7	12.8; 21	33.2; 62	3.1; 0 PP 0.2; ND 0.8; INP 0.2; K 0.6	12.0; 21	43.6; 77	53.3; 92	9.7; 15
Verian	1–7 Oct	983	—N/a	7.0; 12	5.6; 9	3.7; 3	21.4; 41	5.4; 9	4.7; 8	3.8; 3	14.3; 24	31.9; 60	2.3; 0 PP 0.5; ND 0.5; INP 0.1; K 0.5	10.5; 19	43.1; 74	54.7; 95	11.6; 21
InFact	1–1 Oct	2,907	—N/a	8.4; 14	3.6; 3	4.9; 8	21.5; 40	5.4; 9	2.7; 2	4.2; 7	11.9; 20	35.1; 66	2.2; 0 PP 0.1; ND 0.5; INP 0.4; K 0.3	13.6; 26	43.8; 74	53.9; 95	10.1; 21
Opinion	21–27 Sep	1,001	80.3	8.0; 14	4.4; 8	4.4; 8	22.4; 41	5.8; 11	2.5; 2	3.1; 1	13.7; 25	32.6; 59	3.1; 0	10.2; 18	45.0; 82	51.9; 87	6.9; 5
Respons Analyse	10–14 Sep	1,003	—N/a	6.4; 9	5.9; 9	4.1; 6	24.3; 44	4.5; 7	3.6; 3	4.2; 6	16.0; 26	30.4; 59	0.8; 0	6.1; 15	45.2; 75	54.2; 94	9.0; 19
Opinion	7–12 Sep	1,000	78.0	7.9; 13	5.0; 9	3.7; 3	20.6; 40	4.5; 8	3.4; 2	4.2; 7	14.3; 24	32.5; 63	4.0; 0 PP 1.6; ND 0.2; INP 0.4; K 0.4	11.9; 23	41.7; 73	54.4; 96	12.7; 23
Verian	2–8 Sep	985	—N/a	6.6; 11	5.3; 9	4.3; 7	25.6; 48	4.6; 8	3.0; 2	3.5; 3	15.2; 25	29.2; 56	2.7; 0 PP 0.2; ND 1.0; INP 0.8; K 1.0	3.6; 8	46.4; 83	50.9; 86	4.5; 3
Norstat	31 Aug – 5 Sep	1,001	79.1	7.6; 13	4.4; 8	4.7; 8	22.0; 42	6.0; 10	2.8; 2	3.9; 3	15.7; 27	30.2; 56	2.8; 0 PP 0.8; ND 0.8; INP 0.4	8.2; 14	44.7; 81	52.6; 88	7.9; 7
InFact	2 Sep	—N/a	—N/a	7.1; 11	5.9; 10	4.8; 8	22.0; 41	5.1; 8	4.0; 3	4.3; 7	13.7; 22	31.4; 59	1.6; 0	9.4; 18	44.9; 78	53.4; 91	8.5; 13
Norfakta	1–2 Sep	1,003	82.0	6.9; 11	4.8; 8	4.2; 7	24.0; 47	4.4; 7	3.4; 2	3.6; 2	13.2; 22	33.4; 63	2.1; 0 PP 0.2; ND 0.8; INP 0.2; K 0.6	9.4; 16	44.3; 80	53.6; 89	9.3; 9
Opinion	24–29 Aug	1,000	—N/a	7.8; 14	4.3; 8	4.7; 8	22.8; 43	4.6; 8	3.4; 2	3.5; 2	14.9; 27	31.0; 57	2.9; 0	8.2; 14	44.2; 81	52.8; 88	8.6; 7
Opinion	10–16 Aug	1,000	80.2	7.9; 13	5.2; 9	5.4; 9	20.5; 39	5.7; 9	2.8; 2	4.0; 7	15.3; 26	29.1; 55	4.1; 0 PP 0.4; ND 1.3; INP 0.2; K 0.7	8.6; 16	44.7; 79	51.2; 90	6.5; 11
Respons Analyse	5–10 Aug	1,000	—N/a	8.1; 15	4.4; 8	4.4; 8	22.5; 40	5.8; 10	3.4; 2	3.7; 3	16.2; 29	29.6; 54	1.9; 0	7.1; 14	45.2; 81	52.9; 88	7.7; 7
Norstat	11 Aug	1,001	—N/a	7.9; 14	4.3; 8	3.9; 3	22.5; 43	5.2; 9	3.9; 2	4.2; 7	14.7; 26	30.6; 57	2.7; 0 ND 0.5; INP 0.6	8.1; 14	43.8; 77	53.4; 92	9.6; 15
Verian	3–7 Aug	988	—N/a	6.4; 12	8.0; 14	3.5; 3	22.8; 42	5.5; 10	3.1; 2	2.6; 2	15.1; 27	29.7; 57	3.4; 0 PP 0.7; ND 0.4; INP 0.7	6.9; 15	46.2; 81	50.5; 88	4.3; 7
Norfakta	4–5 Aug	1,004	80.0	6.4; 11	5.6; 10	3.8; 3	25.2; 46	4.3; 7	4.0; 7	3.4; 3	15.8; 27	28.9; 55	2.6; 0 PP 0.4; ND 1.0; K 0.5	3.7; 9	45.3; 77	52.1; 92	6.8; 15
Opinion	27 Jul – 1 Aug	1,001	80.0	8.8; 16	4.7; 8	4.0; 7	21.7; 41	4.9; 9	3.5; 2	3.1; 1	14.8; 26	31.2; 59	3.2; 0 PP 0.7; ND 0.3; INP 0.6; K 0.3	9.5; 18	44.1; 81	52.6; 88	8.5; 7
InFact	4 Aug	1,132	—N/a	7.8; 14	3.4; 1	4.3; 8	24.5; 45	5.0; 9	2.7; 2	4.5; 8	13.4; 23	32.0; 59	2.4; 0 PP 0.3; ND 0.2; INP 0.9; K 0.1	7.5; 14	45.0; 77	52.6; 92	7.6; 15
Norfakta	7–8 Jul	1,003	—N/a	8.1; 13	5.2; 8	4.1; 7	22.4; 42	5.5; 9	3.8; 3	4.2; 7	15.7; 26	28.4; 54	2.6; 0 PP 0.2; ND 1.0; INP 0.2; K 0.7	6.0; 12	45.3; 79	52.1; 90	6.8; 11
Verian	24–30 Jun	987	—N/a	6.4; 11	5.1; 8	5.2; 9	23.9; 46	4.7; 8	3.5; 3	3.7; 3	14.3; 24	29.8; 57	3.4; 0 PP 0.9; ND 0.3; INP 0.7; K 0.7	5.9; 11	45.3; 82	51.3; 87	6.0; 5
InFact	30 Jun	1,172	—N/a	6.5; 11	5.1; 8	5.3; 9	21.6; 42	4.6; 7	5.1; 8	4.0; 3	14.3; 23	31.5; 58	2.1; 0	9.9; 16	43.1; 77	54.9; 92	11.8; 15
Norstat	16 Jun	1,005	—N/a	7.4; 12	5.2; 9	4.1; 7	22.4; 42	5.7; 10	4.3; 7	2.9; 1	13.8; 23	30.2; 58	4.0; 0 PP 0.3; ND 0.9; INP 0.9; K 0.6	7.8; 16	44.8; 80	51.2; 89	6.4; 9
Opinion	2–8 Jun	1,000	79.7	8.0; 14	4.0; 7	4.7; 9	19.6; 37	5.8; 11	3.1; 2	3.3; 1	16.8; 30	31.9; 58	2.7; 0 PP 0.3; ND 1.2; INP 0.2; K 0.1	12.3; 21	42.1; 78	55.1; 91	13.0; 13
Respons Analyse	3–8 Jun	1,003	80.0	7.0; 13	5.8; 11	3.8; 3	21.8; 39	4.4; 8	2.6; 2	3.8; 3	16.8; 30	31.5; 60	2.7; 0 ND 0.8; INP 0.6	9.7; 21	42.8; 74	54.7; 95	11.9; 21
Norfakta	2–3 Jun	1,000	—N/a	7.3; 14	5.1; 9	3.9; 3	21.6; 42	5.3; 10	3.0; 2	3.7; 3	17.7; 33	28.9; 53	3.5; 0	7.3; 11	43.2; 78	53.3; 91	10.1; 13
InFact	1 Jun	1,145	—N/a	7.5; 11	4.0; 6	5.0; 7	22.4; 43	4.5; 7	4.6; 7	4.2; 6	12.5; 18	33.3; 64	2.0; 0 ND 0.4; INP 0.4; K 0.5	10.9; 21	43.4; 74	54.6; 95	11.2; 21
Verian	26–29 May	991	—N/a	7.3; 13	5.2; 9	3.2; 2	22.5; 42	5.5; 10	2.3; 1	4.0; 7	18.1; 32	30.0; 53	1.9; 0 PP 0.2; ND 0.5; INP 0.5; K 0.5	7.5; 11	43.7; 76	54.4; 93	10.7; 17
Opinion	18–25 May	1,001	—N/a	7.4; 13	5.1; 9	3.3; 3	22.4; 42	4.9; 8	2.7; 2	4.3; 7	16.8; 29	29.9; 56	3.3; 0 PP 0.7; ND 0.7; INP 0.5; K 0.3	7.5; 14	43.1; 75	53.7; 94	10.6; 19
Norstat	11–18 May	1,000	—N/a	7.1; 12	4.7; 8	4.4; 8	21.1; 41	5.2; 9	2.7; 2	3.8; 3	16.1; 28	31.4; 58	3.6; 0 PP 0.5; ND 0.8; INP 1.0	10.3; 17	42.5; 78	54.0; 91	11.5; 13
Respons Analyse	6–11 May	1,001	—N/a	6.4; 11	5.6; 10	3.9; 3	22.7; 42	5.8; 10	3.9; 3	4.2; 7	18.3; 33	27.1; 50	2.2; 0 PP 0.4; ND 0.6; INP 0.2; K 0.4	4.4; 8	44.4; 76	53.5; 93	9.1; 17
Opinion	4–10 May	1,000	80.0	6.3; 11	4.7; 8	5.0; 9	22.1; 44	5.0; 9	3.0; 2	3.2; 1	15.9; 27	31.0; 58	3.8; 0	8.9; 14	43.1; 81	53.1; 88	10.0; 7
Norfakta	6–7 May	1,001	83.0	7.2; 12	4.9; 8	3.7; 3	22.9; 42	4.9; 8	3.7; 2	4.4; 8	17.1; 30	28.7; 56	2.7; 0 ND 0.6; INP 0.8; K 0.4	5.8; 14	43.6; 73	53.9; 96	10.3; 23
Verian	4–7 May	594	—N/a	6.8; 12	4.1; 7	3.2; 2	24.8; 46	5.2; 9	3.7; 3	4.2; 8	16.8; 31	28.1; 51	3.2; 0	3.3; 5	44.1; 76	52.8; 93	8.7; 17
InFact	4 May	1,124	—N/a	6.9; 12	4.4; 7	4.0; 7	23.2; 43	6.5; 11	3.3; 2	4.4; 7	14.6; 24	30.8; 56	1.9; 0 ND 0.3; INP 0.3; K 0.4	7.6; 13	45.0; 80	53.1; 89	8.1; 9
Opinion	20–25 Apr	1,001	80.0	6.2; 11	5.7; 11	4.6; 8	19.5; 36	5.9; 11	3.6; 2	3.0; 1	19.0; 35	29.1; 54	3.4; 0	9.6; 18	41.9; 77	54.7; 92	12.8; 15
Norstat	13–18 Apr	1,000	—N/a	7.3; 13	5.1; 9	3.8; 3	21.0; 41	5.3; 9	4.2; 7	3.7; 3	17.7; 30	29.2; 54	2.7; 0 PP 0.4; ND 0.3; INP 1.0; K 0.3	8.2; 13	42.5; 75	54.8; 94	12.3; 19
Respons Analyse	8–13 Apr	1,001	—N/a	7.0; 13	4.7; 8	3.9; 3	23.4; 43	5.8; 10	4.2; 8	3.6; 3	18.0; 33	26.5; 48	2.8; 0 PP 0.3; ND 0.8; INP 0.6; K 0.4	3.2; 5	44.8; 77	52.3; 92	7.5; 15
Opinion	7–13 Apr	1,000	—N/a	9.0; 17	4.3; 8	3.5; 2	20.8; 40	4.8; 9	3.5; 2	3.2; 2	18.1; 34	29.9; 55	3.0; 0 PP 0.5; ND 0.1; INP 1.0; K 0.4	5.7; 9	42.4; 76	54.7; 93	12.3; 17
Verian	7–10 Apr	987	—N/a	6.0; 10	6.1; 11	4.7; 8	23.3; 44	5.4; 10	3.7; 3	3.5; 3	16.6; 29	28.6; 51	2.2; 0 ND 0.5; INP 0.5; K 0.7	5.3; 7	45.5; 83	52.4; 86	6.9; 3
Norfakta	7–8 Apr	1,002	—N/a	7.5; 14	5.7; 11	3.2; 2	21.9; 42	5.2; 10	3.9; 2	3.5; 3	18.3; 34	27.6; 51	3.1; 0 PP 0.2; ND 0.3; INP 1.4; K 0.5	5.7; 9	43.5; 79	53.3; 90	9.8; 11
InFact	30 Mar	1,117	—N/a	7.4; 14	4.4; 8	3.7; 3	20.4; 38	5.4; 10	3.7; 2	3.7; 3	17.8; 33	30.9; 58	2.4; 0 PP 0.1; ND 0.7; INP 0.5; K 0.2	10.5; 20	41.3; 73	56.1; 96	14.8; 23
Opinion	23–24 Mar	1,000	80.0	6.9; 11	5.6; 9	4.1; 7	21.3; 41	4.6; 7	4.1; 6	4.4; 7	17.7; 30	27.2; 51	4.1; 0 PP 0.1; ND 1.2; INP 2.0; K 0.4	5.9; 10	42.5; 75	53.4; 94	10.5; 19
Norstat	16–21 Mar	1,000	—N/a	8.0; 15	4.5; 8	5.0; 9	21.9; 42	3.7; 1	2.9; 2	2.4; 1	19.6; 37	28.1; 54	3.9; 0 PP 1.1; ND 0.7; INP 0.8; K 0.6	6.2; 12	43.1; 75	53.0; 94	9.9; 19
Opinion	9–16 Mar	1,000	79.5	7.2; 13	6.1; 11	5.3; 9	22.5; 45	4.4; 8	3.3; 2	3.6; 3	16.2; 28	26.7; 50	4.7; 0 PP 1.0; ND 0.6; INP 0.4; K 0.6	4.2; 7	45.5; 86	49.8; 83	4.3 -3
Respons Analyse	4–9 Mar	1,000	—N/a	7.3; 13	4.5; 8	3.9; 3	24.3; 44	5.0; 9	4.7; 8	3.8; 3	18.8; 33	25.9; 48	2.0; 0	1.6; 4	45; 77	53.2; 92	8.2; 15
Norfakta	3–4 Mar	1,000	82.0	6.4; 10	4.5; 7	4.1; 6	22.3; 42	4.9; 8	4.0; 6	4.6; 7	17.4; 28	28.8; 55	3.1; 0 ND 0.8; INP 0.6; K 0.3	6.5; 13	42.2; 73	54.8; 96	12.6; 23
InFact	2 Mar	1,077	—N/a	9.1; 15	4.5; 8	4.0; 7	22.3; 42	4.3; 7	2.7; 2	3.5; 3	16.8; 29	30.2; 56	2.7; 0 PP 0.3; ND 0.5; INP 0.9; K 0.3	7.9; 14	44.2; 79	53.2; 90	9.0; 11
Opinion	23 Feb – 2 Mar	—N/a	79.0	8.7; 17	3.7; 2	3.8; 3	23.1; 45	5.8; 11	2.4; 2	3.4; 3	19.2; 37	25.5; 49	4.5; 0 PP 1.5; ND 1.6; INP 0.5; K 0.2	2.4; 4	45.1; 78	50.5; 91	5.4; 13
Verian	23–27 Feb	984	—N/a	7.4; 12	4.4; 7	4.3; 7	25.7; 49	5.4; 9	3.9; 3	4.4; 7	18.8; 33	23.0; 42	2.6; 0 PP 0.1; ND0.7; INP 0.4; K 0.1	2.7; 7	47.2; 84	50.1; 85	2.9; 1
Norstat	16–21 Feb	1,003	79.9	7.7; 13	5.1; 9	4.5; 8	21.8; 40	5.3; 9	2.3; 1	4.0; 7	20.0; 35	26.6; 47	2.8; 0 ND 0.8; INP 0.7; K 0.4	4.8; 7	44.4; 79	52.9; 90	8.5; 11
Opinion	9–16 Feb	1,000	81.0	7.2; 13	4.2; 7	4.5; 8	23.1; 44	6.4; 11	3.0; 2	3.7; 3	15.7; 28	28.0; 53	4.1; 0	4.9; 9	45.4; 83	50.4; 86	5.0; 3
Respons Analyse	4–9 Feb	1,002	—N/a	7.8; 15	4.5; 8	3.4; 2	24.9; 46	5.2; 10	3.9; 3	3.5; 3	18.0; 33	26.1; 49	2.6; 0	1.2; 3	45.8; 81	51.5; 88	5.7; 7
Norfakta	3–4 Feb	1,001	—N/a	6.4; 12	5.2; 9	3.2; 2	25.1; 46	4.5; 8	3.2; 2	4.0; 7	19.0; 35	26.3; 48	2.9; 0 ND0.4; INP 0.8; Lib 0.1	1.2; 2	44.4; 77	52.5; 92	8.1; 15
InFact	2 Feb	1,121	—N/a	7.5; 13	4.3; 7	4.2; 7	22.3; 42	5.9; 10	4.2; 7	3.8; 3	16.3; 27	28.2; 53	3.2; 0	5.9; 11	44.2; 79	52.5; 90	8.3; 11
Opinion	26–31 Jan	1,000	82.9	7.1; 13	4.1; 8	3.1; 2	27.2; 48	5.9; 11	4.4; 8	3.6; 3	17.3; 32	23.7; 44	4.5; 0	2.5; 4	47.4; 82	49.0; 87	1.6; 3
Verian	26–30 Jan	990	—N/a	6.9; 13	4.5; 8	3.6; 3	27.2; 51	5.7; 11	3.4; 2	3.4; 3	16.5; 31	25.1; 47	3.9; 0 PP 0.5; ND 1.1; INP 0.6; K 0.6	2.1; 4	47.9; 86	48.4; 83	0.5 -3
Norstat	27 Jan	1,000	—N/a	7.0; 13	4.1; 8	3.7; 3	26.8; 48	6.8; 12	2.7; 2	4.7; 8	16.0; 29	25.2; 46	3.0; 0	1.4; 2	48.4; 84	48.6; 85	0.2; 1
Opinion	12–19 Jan	1,000	79.0	6.3; 11	5.7; 10	4.8; 9	23.2; 44	5.3; 9	2.5; 2	3.1; 2	18.0; 32	27.2; 50	3.9; 0	4.0; 6	45.3; 83	50.8; 86	5.5; 3
Respons Analyse	7–9 Jan	1,001	83.8	6.4; 11	5.5; 9	4.0; 7	25.2; 47	4.8; 8	3.2; 2	3.5; 3	17.4; 32	27.9; 50	2.2; 0	2.7; 3	45.9; 82	52.0; 87	6.1; 5
Verian	5–8 Jan	984	—N/a	6.0; 10	6.1; 10	4.2; 7	25.2; 48	4.6; 7	3.9; 3	4.2; 7	18.3; 32	23.2; 45	4.3; 0 PP 1.0; ND 1.3; INP 0.1; K 0.6	2.0; 3	46.1; 82	49.6; 87	3.5; 5
Norfakta	6–7 Jan	1,005	—N/a	6.4; 10	5.2; 8	4.6; 7	24.9; 45	4.8; 7	4.1; 6	4.2; 7	17.5; 32	25.8; 47	2.5; 0 ND 1.3; INP 0.5	0.9; 2	45.9; 77	51.6; 92	5.7; 15
InFact	6 Jan	1,018	—N/a	6.0; 10	5.0; 8	4.7; 8	21.3; 42	5.6; 9	3.0; 2	4.0; 7	15.0; 25	31.9; 58	3.5; 0 PP 0.5; ND 1.0; INP 1.0; K 0.2	10.6; 16	42.6; 77	53.9; 92	11.3; 15
2025 election	8 Sep	4,059,218	80.1	5.3; 9	5.6; 9	4.7; 8	28.0; 53	5.6; 9	3.7; 3	4.2; 7	14.6; 24	23.8; 47	4.3; 0	4.2; 6	49.2; 88	46.3; 81	2.9; 7

=== 2025 ===
Polling execution				Parties											Blocs		
Polling firm	Fieldwork date	Sample size	Resp.	Red					Blue				Others	Lead	Red	Blue	Lead
Polling firm	Fieldwork date	Sample size	Resp.	R	SV	MDG	Ap	Sp	V	KrF	H	FrP	Others	Lead	Red	Blue	Lead
Opinion	8–15 Dec	1,000	82.0	7.6; 14	4.5; 9	3.7; 3	25.1; 47	5.8; 11	3.2; 2	2.9; 1	18.1; 34	25.2; 48	3.8; 0	0.1; 1	46.7; 84	49.4; 85	3.0; 1
Norstat	8–13 Dec	1,000	—N/a	6.4; 11	5.2; 9	4.5; 8	24.1; 45	4.4; 7	4.0; 7	3.0; 2	17.2; 30	27.3; 50	3.9; 0 PP 1.2; ND 0.6; INP 0.9; K 0.4	3.2; 5	44.6; 80	51.5; 89	6.9; 9
Respons Analyse	3–8 Dec	1,000	—N/a	7.0; 11	5.7; 9	4.2; 7	22.8; 42	6.0; 10	4.1; 7	3.1; 2	17.5; 32	27.7; 49	2.0; 0	4.9; 7	45.7; 79	52.4; 90	6.7; 11
Norfakta	2–3 Dec	1,000	—N/a	6.4; 12	5.0; 9	5.0; 9	25.5; 46	6.1; 11	2.8; 2	3.0; 1	17.6; 32	26.1; 47	2.5; 0 PP 0.8; ND 0.2; K 0.4	0.6; 1	48.0; 87	49.5; 82	1.5 -5
Opinion	24 Nov – 2 Dec	1,201	81.0	6.9; 12	5.1; 9	3.7; 3	22.2; 42	6.0; 11	4.7; 8	4.0; 3	17.8; 32	26.7; 49	2.9; 0	4.5; 7	42.6; 77	53.2; 92	10.6; 15
InFact	1 Dec	1,096	—N/a	7.2; 12	5.3; 9	4.9; 8	21.6; 41	5.7; 9	3.2; 2	4.0; 6	17.4; 31	27.9; 51	2.8; 0 PP 0.1; ND 0.6; INP 0.4; K 0.4	6.3; 10	44.7; 79	52.5; 90	7.8; 11
Verian	1 Dec	—N/a	—N/a	5.5; 10	5.0; 9	5.8; 10	23.2; 42	6.8; 12	3.6; 2	4.2; 7	17.1; 30	25.6; 47	3.3; 0 PP 0.3; ND 0.9; INP 0.5; K 0.3	2.4; 5	46.3; 83	50.5; 86	4.2; 3
Norstat	18 Nov	999	—N/a	7.5; 13	5.2; 9	4.2; 7	24.8; 45	5.6; 10	2.6; 2	4.3; 8	16.5; 29	25.7; 46	3.8; 0 PP 1.0; ND 0.7; INP 0.5; K 0.4	0.9; 1	47.3; 84	49.1; 85	1.8; 1
Opinion	10–17 Nov	1,000	81.0	6.8; 13	6.8; 12	3.8; 3	22.6; 42	6.4; 12	3.3; 2	3.0; 2	19.7; 36	25.0; 47	2.5; 0	2.4; 5	46.4; 82	51.0; 87	4.6; 5
Respons Analyse	4–7 Nov	1,000	—N/a	6.4; 11	5.5; 9	4.5; 8	22.0; 42	6.2; 10	3.8; 3	4.3; 7	18.7; 32	25.7; 47	3.0; 0	3.7; 5	44.6; 80	52.5; 89	7.9; 9
InFact	5 Nov	—N/a	—N/a	7.4; 13	4.9; 9	3.7; 3	22.3; 42	5.9; 11	3.7; 3	4.3; 8	16.9; 31	27.1; 49	3.8; 0 PP 0.1; ND 0.7; INP 0.8; K 0.5	4.4; 7	44.2; 78	52.0; 91	7.8; 9
Norfakta	4–5 Nov	1,003	—N/a	6.2; 11	4.7; 8	5.1; 9	24.3; 45	5.4; 10	3.2; 2	3.7; 3	16.6; 29	27.3; 52	3.4; 0 PP 0.1; ND 1.0; INP 0.3; K 0.4	3.0; 7	45.7; 83	50.8; 86	5.1; 3
Opinion	27 Oct – 3 Nov	1,001	83.0	6.1; 11	5.1; 9	4.9; 8	23.9; 46	6.1; 11	2.5; 2	3.4; 3	17.0; 30	26.8; 49	4.2; 0 PP 0.7; ND 0.4; INP 1.1; K 0.6	2.9; 3	46.1; 85	49.7; 84	3.6 -1
Verian	27–31 Oct	1,194	—N/a	6.3; 10	5.8; 9	4.1; 6	25.0; 48	5.5; 8	4.6; 7	5.7; 9	15.9; 30	23.3; 42	3.9; 0 PP 0.7; ND 0.2; INP 1.0; K 0.7	1.7; 6	46.7; 81	49.5; 88	2.8; 7
Norstat	21 Oct	—N/a	—N/a	6.7; 12	5.4; 10	4.8; 9	26.2; 49	5.5; 10	3.9; 3	3.5; 3	16.6; 30	23.5; 43	3.9; 0 PP 0.6; ND 0.5; INP 0.6; K 1.2	2.7; 6	48.6; 90	47.5; 79	1.1; 11
Opinion	13–20 Oct	1,000	83.0	6.9; 11	7.0; 11	3.8; 3	24.8; 49	5.4; 8	4.3; 7	4.8; 7	16.2; 31	23.2; 42	3.7; 0	1.6; 7	47.9; 82	48.5; 87	0.6; 5
Respons Analyse	8–13 Oct	1,002	—N/a	5.7; 9	6.0; 9	4.1; 6	28.4; 55	5.1; 8	4.2; 7	3.6; 3	14.9; 25	25.0; 47	3.1; 0 PP 0.3; ND 0.8; INP 0.7; K 0.3	3.4; 8	49.3; 87	47.7; 82	1.6; 5
Norfakta	7–8 Oct	1,006	90.0	5.9; 10	4.9; 8	4.5; 7	29.0; 54	4.5; 7	3.4; 2	4.4; 7	15.1; 25	25.5; 49	4.9; 0 PP 0.2; ND 1.5; INP 1.1; K 0.7	3.5; 5	48.8; 86	48.4; 83	0.4; 3
InFact	6 Oct	1,094	—N/a	5.6; 9	5.5; 9	5.5; 9	28.8; 54	4.8; 8	2.8; 2	4.6; 7	13.9; 22	25.3; 49	3.1; 0	3.5; 5	50.2; 89	46.6; 80	3.6; 9
Verian	29 Sep – 3 Oct	992	—N/a	6.2; 10	5.8; 9	4.4; 7	29.4; 55	5.9; 9	4.2; 6	4.1; 6	15.0; 26	21.6; 41	3.4; 0 PP 0.4; ND 0.8; INP 0.4; K 0.5	7.8; 14	51.7; 90	44.9; 79	6.8; 11
2025 election	8 Sep	4,059,218	80.1	5.3; 9	5.6; 9	4.7; 8	28.0; 53	5.6; 9	3.7; 3	4.2; 7	14.6; 24	23.8; 47	4.3; 0	4.2; 6	49.2; 88	46.3; 81	2.9; 7
