= Oslo Symposium =

Norwegian Christian conservative conference

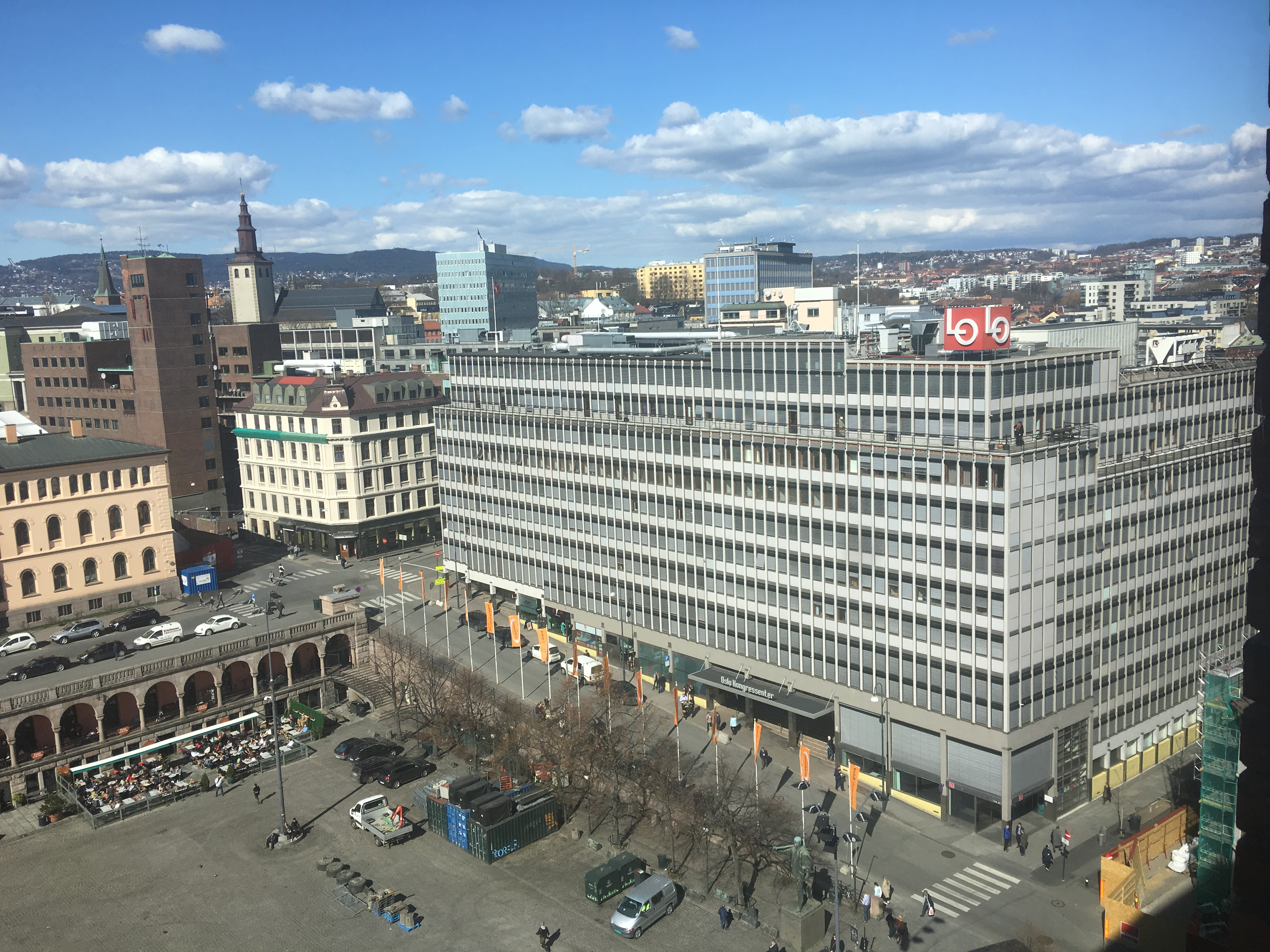
Oslo Symposium was held biennially at the Oslo Kongressenter until 2019, after which it has been held at other locations.

The Oslo Symposium is a biennial Norwegian Christian conservative conference, first arranged in 2011. The initiative to the conference was taken by Bjarte Ystebø and the organisation Kristenfolket, now Kristen Media Norge, in cooperation with the International Christian Embassy Jerusalem and Norge Idag, and it has been broadcast live by Visjon Norge. The conference includes speeches by leading Norwegian and international commentators and politicians, including party leaders and government ministers.

The third conference, in 2015 for the first time had to be arranged with "massive" police security, due to a general threat evaluation by the Norwegian Police Security Service, pointing to the Paris and Copenhagen terrorist attacks the two preceding months.
