= Joel Ystebø =

Norwegian politician (born 2001)

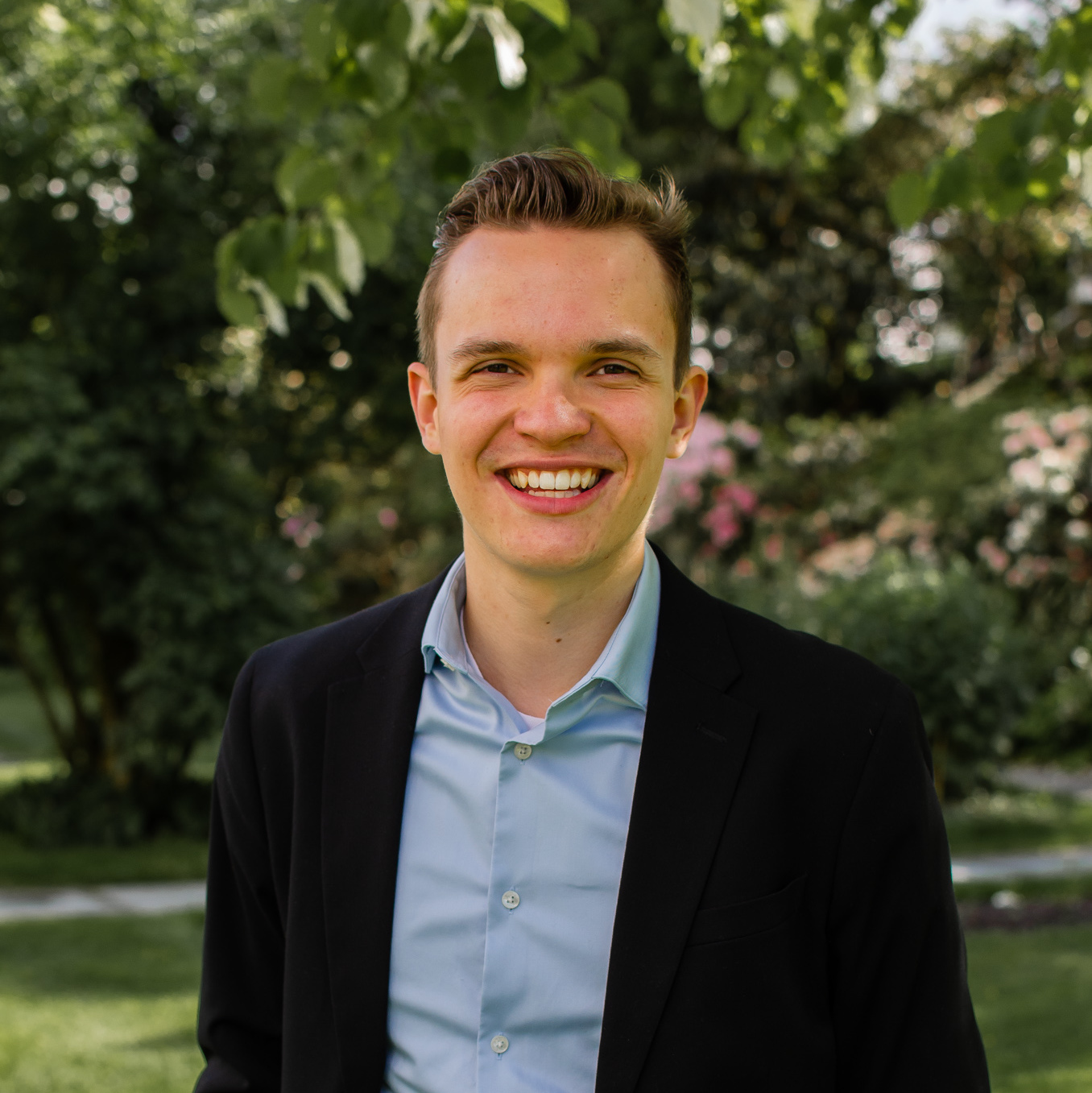
- Ystebø in 2021

Member of the Storting
- Incumbent
- Assumed office 1 October 2025
- Constituency: Hordaland

Personal details
- Born: 3 October 2001 (age 24)
- Party: Christian Democratic Party
- Parent: Bjarte Ystebø (father)
- Relatives: Asbjørn Odd Ystebø (grandfather)

Joel Ystebø (born 3 October 2001) is a Norwegian politician who was elected member of the Storting in 2025. He is the son of Bjarte Ystebø and the grandson of Asbjørn Odd Ystebø.
