= Visjon Norge =

- Type: Religious broadcast television network
- Country: Norway
- Broadcast area: Scandinavia
- Headquarters: Drammen, Norway

Ownership
- Sister channels: TV Vision Sverige; TV Vision Danmark; TV Vision Heaven; TV Vision Kids

History
- Launched: 24 March 2003
- Founder: Jan Hanvold

Links
- Website: www.visjonnorge.com

Availability

Terrestrial
- RiksTV: Channel 51
- Allente: Channel 177
- T-We: Channel 320 (optional)
- Telia: Channel 115 (optional)
- NextGenTel: Optional
- Altibox: Optional

Streaming media
- Digital media receiver: Chromecast
- Digital media receiver: Apple TV
- Web-TV: Watch live

Visjon Norge (or TV Visjon Norge) is a Norwegian Christian television station, which was launched in 2003 as the first Scandinavian Christian television channel to air 24 hours a day. It can be reached throughout Scandinavia by satellite. The founder and executive editor of the channel is Jan Hanvold. A sister channel based in Sweden was launched in 2015, and later also in Denmark.

== Organization ==
TV Visjon Norge has 75 employees, in addition to a number of volunteers. The television department of the organisation has 30 employees. 46% of the channel's programming is produced by its broadcasting partners, and the remainder by the channel itself. Visjon Norge also does aid work in Eastern Europe and Africa, and has aired programs about its work in Moldova. In addition it operates two radio stations, and has a monthly magazine with 17,000 subscribers (2011). The organisation has its headquarters in Drammen. Since 2011 it has an annual operating revenue (nearly all donations) of around 90 million kr.

== History ==
Visjon Norge began broadcasting on 24 March 2003. It airs across Scandinavia 24 hours a day, with a variety of Christian-themed programming, aiming to preach the gospel of Jesus and to support the state of Israel; it has been described as "staunchly pro-Israel" and Christian Zionist. The company is owned by Visjonskirken, a local congregation founded by Jan Hanvold and his wife Inger in 2001, but the channel itself is officially interdenominational. The channel claimed 100,000 more or less regular viewers by 2007, in addition to Norway, mostly in Sweden and the Faroe Islands. It is available to 98% of Norwegian households, and averages around 20,000 daily viewers in Norway as of 2015 (TNS Gallup).

Visjon Norge has been cited as a central part in mobilizing the development of a new Christian right in Norway, and accused of promoting the Christians Party. Abroad, the channel has held meeting campaigns with thousands of people in the Faroe Islands.

=== TV Vision Norden ===
Due to a large viewership and more programming from Sweden, Visjon Norge attempted to branch out to the country with a television studio in Floda, Lerum in 2010. While the initial attempt to launch a stand-alone channel fell through, the sister channel TV Vision Norden was eventually launched in 2015. The channel is based in Gothenburg.

== Programming ==
In addition to its own programming, the station broadcasts programs by various groups and people, including Forum Idag, Hanne Nabintu Herland, Oslo Symposium (biennial conference), ES TV, Dansk TV Mission, Open Doors, Hope Channel, and formerly included Hillsong, Youth of Europe and Livets Ord.

In 2014 Livets Ord was replaced with a slot for Ludvig Nessa and the "Church of Norway in Exile", following Hanvold attacking Livets Ord leader Ulf Ekman as a "heretic" after Ekman converted to Roman Catholicism, and accusing Livets Ord of "sectarianism" and of operating as a "personality cult".

The station also has shows hosted by evangelists Svein-Magne Pedersen and Jan-Aage Torp.

== Controversies ==
In its early years TV Visjon Norge was funded by the aid foundation Visjon Norge Misjon, formerly Visjon Bibel Center (VBC) founded by Hanvold in 1989, which has been criticized for using most of its donated aid money on television operations and purchasing property for TV Visjon Norge. VBC reportedly spent 6 million kr on property for TV Visjon Norge in 2003, and in 2007 purchased a property in Drammen for 6.5 million kr for the television channel.

In 2006 the channel was reprimanded by the Norwegian Media Authority after a rerun of an evening show was aired in an early morning timeslot on NRK2 (which formerly had slots for independent programming), showing an explicit video of an abortion procedure. Hanvold apologized and described the incident as a technical mistake.

In 2015 Visjon Norge was criticized for shows in which the Nigerian pastor Bayo Oniwinde had called on viewers to donate large sums of money to the channel, asking for 2,500 kr to 200,000 kr, in order to get blessings and miracles. In response to the criticism, Hanvold defended Oniwinde, noting some cultural differences and that the portion of the show had been taken out of context, while stating that Visjon Norge did not support any notion of direct payment for miracles or healing.

In February 2020, preacher Dionny Baez appeared on Visjon Norge telling viewers to donate 2020 kroner, saying it would protect the giver's children from the COVID-19 pandemic.

The station has been criticized for promoting the book 22. juli-profetien ('The 22 July Prophecy') in which "obscure American evangelist Jeremy Hoff [claims that the domestic terrorist attack in Norway in 2011] was God's punishment on the Labour Party and the Workers' Youth League for their critique of Israel."
