= Anita Apelthun Sæle =

Norwegian politician (born 1951)

Anita Apelthun Sæle (born 13 December 1951) is a Norwegian politician who was a member of the Norwegian parliament from 1993 until 2005, representing the Christian Democratic Party (KrF) and the county of Hordaland.

== Biography ==
Sæle was among the most conservative members of KrF, and a firm opponent of abortion and gay rights. In foreign policy. Sæle was opposed to Norwegian membership in the European Union, and was a supporter of Israel. She is married to Finn Jarle Sæle who runs the Christian conservative newspaper Norge Idag, and they have four children, including the son Finn Ørjan Sæle.

In the KrF nomination for parliament ahead of the 2005 parliamentary election, Sæle lost both the top and second spot on the KrF ballot, to Ingebrigt Sørfonn and Laila Dåvøy respectively, in spite of warnings from some members that losing her from the ballot might cost the party conservative voters. After losing the nomination, she was offered a top spot on the Coastal Party's ballot, but declined the offer.

In April 2006, Sæle became the leader of the women's division of the Christian Democratic Party. She then stated her belief that free abortion will eventually become illegal in Norway due to failing birth rates, praising a proposed abortion ban in South Dakota.

After withdrawing from national politics, she has worked for her husband's newspaper Norge Idag.
