= Bjarte Ystebø =

Bjarte Ystebø (born 1979) is a Norwegian Christian conservative newspaper editor and organiser.

Ystebø was the assistant editor of the Christian conservative newspaper Norge Idag from its founding in 1999 until 2022. He has also been active in the Christian Democratic Party in Bergen, being described as an influential member of the party's conservative right-wing. Since then, he has been the leader of Kristen Media Norge (Christian Media Norway), and an editor for the International Christian Embassy Jerusalem. He has spearheaded the biennial Christian conservative conference Oslo Symposium since 2011.

He is an avowed Christian Zionist, supporting Israel in the Gaza war, after having been present in Israel during the October 7 attacks in 2023. He has also been active against abortion, saying that he wants a vision of zero abortions in Norway. He is a proponent of Young Earth creationism.
