= Finn Jarle Sæle =

Finn Jarle Sæle (born 10 June 1947) is a Norwegian newspaper editor, activist, theologian and former priest. Sæle is the editor of the Bergen-based Christian conservative weekly newspaper Norge Idag, which he founded after he was fired as editor of the Christian newspaper Dagen in 1999 due to internal conflicts, a position he had held since 1985.

Sæle has been noted as a Christian right activist, particularly on the conflicts in the Middle East, abortion and same-sex marriage. He worked together with Pat Robertson to help establish the Christian Coalition Norway in 1993, modeled after the Christian Coalition of America. Robertson spoke at the Grieg Hall in Bergen the same year, and Sæle visited the United States on an annual basis from that time on. As a Christian Zionist, Sæle has arranged rallies in support of Israel, and advocated for newspapers to publish the Jyllands-Posten Muhammad cartoons. He has also warned about Islam and Islamisation, and been described by Vårt Land as a supporter of the Eurabia-theory. He has long supported anti-abortion activist priests Børre Knudsen, and Ludvig Nessa, a student friend.

Sæle is married to former Christian Democratic member of parliament Anita Apelthun Sæle. They have four children together.
