= ES TV =

Norwegian Christian television station

ES TV is a Norwegian Christian Pentecostal TV station. ES TV broadcasts from a grid of ground transmitters, via satellite and also as Web TV. The station began its mission in 1993. the foundation Pinsevennenes Evangeliesenter (Pentecostal Gospel Center in Norway) owns the broadcaster.

Pinsevennenes Evangeliesenter is a diaconal, voluntary based organization which works with addicts, assisting in freeing people from their addictions and in getting started with "a new life".

== History ==
The TV station was established two years after the Gospel Center had begun regular radio broadcasts in Oslo. In February 2003, it announced its plans to improve its production capabilities, using satellite technology. The goal was to obtain 2,000 supporters during the course of the year with monthly donations worth NOK 50 to 100.

On 1 June 2020, it ceased delivering its program to Visjon Norge.

== Programming ==
The programs which are presented are recordings from Christian meetings, singing and music, topical shows as well as news programming. The aim is to present the Gospels and to present the addict care program of the gospel center.

ES TV's transmissions target the Nordic countries 18 hours each week via the satellite broadcaster TV Visjon Norge, and as Web TV via the web pages of TV Visjon Norge. In the Greater Oslo Region 14 hours each week are being transmitted via the ground-based grid of transmitters belonging to NRK2 as well as cable television from Liberty Global Europe's Norwegian affiliate, UPC Norge.

== See also ==
- Religious broadcasting
