= Svein-Magne Pedersen =

Svein-Magne Pedersen (born 6 January 1948) is a Norwegian evangelist and preacher.

He is the founder of Misjonen Jesus Leger which focuses on faith healing, claiming to cure anything to AIDS and cancer, and until 2018 operated healing service for payment over telephone. He has also raised money for alleged aid projects including orphanages that newspaper Verdens Gang after an investigation found to be non-existent. From 2003 to 2021, his organisation had earnings of close to 250 million kr.

He has claimed that Christians are protected from getting COVID-19, and described COVID-19 vaccinations as "poison".

He hosts the show Miraklet er ditt on the Christian television station Visjon Norge, and has in total outside of television been an evangelist for over 50 years.
