= Jan Hanvold =

Norwegian televangelist pastor

Jan Kåre Hanvold (born 29 April 1951) is a Norwegian Word of Faith preacher, televangelist pastor, and businessman. Hanvold is the founder and owner of the Christian television station Visjon Norge, which is broadcast throughout Scandinavia, and is involved in several other Christian media organizations including Vision Bibel Center, Euro Vision Network AS, and Radio Visjon.

== Background ==
In the 1980s, inspired by American neo-charismatic theology, Hanvold began to invest heavily in evangelism and healing meetings with hired preachers, including at Jordal Amfi, an ice hockey rink in Oslo. The business was united under the Ny Visjon ('new vision') banner and was run out of a former factory in Drøbak. In 1985, he started a Bible school in the building, Ny Visjon bibelskole, based on Kenneth Hagin's Word of Faith movement. It was founded along with Sigfred Rafoss and Hans Bratterud, both with central roles in Oslo Fullevangeliske Kirke (OFK). There were also plans for a new Christian newspaper. Together with Bratterud, Hanvold also ran the European Broadcasting Network and the New World Channel, a TV channel inspired by American Christian TV channels. The channel reached around 100,000 households in Norway, Sweden, Finland, the Netherlands and France before it was shut down in 1986. At the same time, Hanvold ran his own company, Jan Hanvold Ministries, which distributed recordings of speeches by international preachers and himself. In 1989, Hanvold also set up the Vision Bible Center (VBC) foundation to conduct missionary work and distribute Bibles in Eastern Europe under the name Bibelen for Alle ('the Bible for All').

The business gradually spiraled out of control, culminating in a series of bankruptcies in 1989. Hanvold personally declared bankruptcy, was not allowed to run a business for a period of time due to bankruptcy (konkurskarantene), and was sentenced to 120 days in prison, of which 45 days were unconditional.

As Visjon Bibel Center was a foundation with no links to Hanvold's other corporate structures, it survived the bankruptcy. In 1990, Frank Kaleb Jansen became a member of the foundation's board. At the same time, he became the face of the foundation in fundraising for missionary work. At this time, Hanvold was also on the board of OFK Radio, which was run by Hans Bratterud.

He has referred to Visjon Norge as an "electronic church".

== Theological profile ==
Hanvold holds to Evangelical Christian theology with its emphasis on Jesus Christ as savior, and a strong belief in miracles seen in daily life. Hanvold's theological views have led to him being compared with Norwegian Pentecostal preachers Aage Samuelsen and Aril Edvardsen. Hanvold preaches prosperity theology and is clear that spiritual and financial success are closely linked. He also supports Israel and the Jewish people, and has been described as a Christian Zionist by bishop Atle Sommerfeldt, who criticised Hanvold for his views that the Holocaust was a divine punishment for Jews turning away from God.

== Business ==
Hanvold's business has been investigated for its spending practices, and his resume includes a series of bankruptcies and a jail sentence. He has been criticised for raising large amounts of money through his religious media projects; in 2016 the Norwegian state broadcaster NRK estimated that his media projects had raised more than 1 billion kr ($119,045,291 USD) in 15 years. Scrutiny of these projects has discovered that the funds he raises for charity are scantily spent on the purposes for which they are raised. In 2010 Hanvold accused Norwegian fundamentalist Christians of embezzlement, claiming that by donating less than one tenth of their income as tithe to Christian organizations, the group is stealing 8 million kr ($1,323,590 USD) from God annually. Hanvold, in 2010 and 2016, made more money than any other person employed by Norwegian Christian organizations, according to official tax figures.

== Views ==
Hanvold announced that he was praying for the failure of the Norwegian coalition government in 2005.

Hanvold has criticized the Norwegian Princess Märtha Louise's plans to open a private school, known as Astarte Education, teaching students how to communicate with angels. Hanvold accused the princess of "blasphemy" and said she was "an emissary from hell."

In 2016 and 2020, Hanvold supported the candidacy of American president Donald Trump, "claiming before the election that Trump had won."

== Criticism ==
Norwegian Pentecostal leader Ingunn Ulfsten has said that "Hanvold does not represent the Pentecostal movement". A 2019 master's thesis found similar sentiments among other Norwegian Pentecostal and free church pastors.
