= Industry and Business Party =

Industry and Business Party Industri- og Næringspartiet
- Abbreviation: INP
- Leader: Lars Husby
- Founder: Owe Ingemann Waltherzøe
- Founded: 29 February 2020
- Registered: 6 May 2020
- Headquarters: Sandefjord
- Membership (2023): ▲11,600
- Ideology: Populism; Euroscepticism; Economic nationalism
- Political position: Right-wing
- Colours: Orange; Azure
- Slogan: Stabilitet og forutsigbarhet ('Stability and Predictability'); Utvikling, ikke avvikling ('Development, not Liquidation'); Vi vil bygge Norge ('We will build Norway')
- Storting: 0 / 169
- County Councils: 30 / 639
- Municipal Councils: 241 / 9,344

Website
- inpartiet.no

The Industry and Business Party (Norwegian: Industri- og Næringspartiet, INP) is a Norwegian political party founded at Vemork in Rjukan on 29 February 2020. It is generally seen as a right-wing party. On 1 February 2023, the Health Party formally started the merging process with the Industry and Business Party.

== Party program and ideology ==
The party program was drawn up based on proposals from members of the party's Facebook group.

INP calls itself a centre-oriented moderate party with values from both the right and left of the political landscape. Third-party sources have referred to the party as right-wing or syncretic.

The party denies the scientific consensus on climate change, describing it as hysteria and saying any change is not caused by humans.

== Electoral results ==
The party collected the necessary 5,000 signatures from eligible Norwegians and was registered as a national political party by the Brønnøysund Register Centre on 6 May 2020. INP presented lists in all counties for the first time in the 2021 Norwegian parliamentary election.

=== Storting ===
Election	Leader	Votes	%	Seats	+/–	Position	Status
2021	Owe Ingemann Waltherzøe	10,031	0.34%	0 / 169	New	13th	Extra-parliamentary
2025	Øystein Høksnes	18,771	0.58%	0 / 169	0	13th	Extra-parliamentary

=== Local ===
Election	Leader	Votes	%	Seats	+/–	Government
2023 (municipality)	Owe Ingemann Waltherzøe	79,996	3.0 (#10)	238 / 9,344	New	
2023 (county)	Owe Ingemann Waltherzøe	91,445	4.3 (#7)	30 / 723	New	

== Party leaders ==
As of January 2024, Joar Nesse is the party leader and Line Kjos holds the position as deputy leader.

List of party leaders
Period	Name
2020–2024	Owe Ingemann Waltherzøe
Jan 2024 – Apr 2024	Joar Nesse (acting)
Apr 2024	Ann Jorun Hillersøy
2025–2026	Øystein Høksnes
2026–	Lars Husby

=== Party Congresses ===
- 1. landsmøte 2023 April, Lillestrøm
- 2. landsmøte 2024 26 - 28 April, Hurdal

Candidate	Votes	%
Ann Jorun Hillersøy	87	65.91
Øistein Høksnes	45	34.09
Total	132	100.00
Source: "Industri- og næringspartiet". Industri- og næringspartiet (in Norwegian).
