= 2029 Special Olympics World Winter Games =

13th Special Olympics World Winter Games
- Host city: Zurich, Switzerland
- Motto: Celebrating winter sport (German: Den Wintersport feiern)
- Nations: TBC
- Athletes: TBC
- Events: TBC
- Opening: 10 March 2029
- Closing: 17 March 2029
- Opened by: TBC
- Torch lighter: TBC
- Main venue: Letzigrund (opening ceremony); Chur Hallonstadion (closing ceremony)

Summer

Winter

The 2029 Special Olympics World Winter Games (German: Special Olympics Weltwinterspiele 2029) or XIII Special Olympics World Winter Games and commonly known as Switzerland 2029, is a planned international multi-sport event. It will be the 13th Special Olympics International Winter Games. They are scheduled to be held from 10 to 17 March 2029 in the cantons of Graubünden and Zurich, Switzerland. The sporting part will be held entirely in the canton of Graubünden, and the opening ceremony is scheduled to take place in Zurich.

== Bidding Process ==
The bid documents was prepared by Special Olympics Switzerland in partnership with seven public partners (Switzerland Government, the cantons of Chur, Graubünden, Grisons, Zürich, among the Albula Region, the Plessur Region. and the University of Applied Sciences of the Grisons) On 19 June 2021, Switzerland was awarded the event by the Special Olympics. The condition was that public funding had to be available by 30 September 2022; this was achieved. The contract was awarded at the same time as the 2025 Special Olympics World Winter Games was awarded to Turin.

The opening ceremony is to take place on March 6, 2029, in the Letzigrund in Zurich and the closing ceremonies are planned to be in Chur Hallenstadion.The logistics for those events is also supported by the Host Town Programs throughout Switzerland. This offers sporting, cultural and entertainment activities, a social exchange with the local population and lived inclusion. For this purpose, the delegations will be assigned to the cantons in the days before the games according to possibilities; 23 of them will be guests in the twelve districts of the canton of Zurich and twelve districts of the city of Zurich, for example. For this purpose, each Host Town Committee will develop a concept based on free accommodation, food and transport for the international guests. The Canton of Zurich expects around 6,100 overnight stays for the Host Town Program and the opening ceremony, around 10,000 visitors for the opening ceremony and around 2,000 participants at the meetings, receptions and congresses.

Around 2,500 athletes from 110 National Programs are expected to take part in the games. According to the funding decision, 650 coaches are also expected, making the World Games the fourth largest multi-sport event in the world after the Olympic Games, the Paralympics and the World University Games.

The games are intended to enable universities and technical colleges to plan and carry out scientific projects on inclusion.

The Pre-Games event is expected to take place in Chur from March 13 to 18, 2028. They are also planned to be National Games of SOSWI and the test event for the WWG 2029. Over 800 athletes and coaches will take part WWG 2029 over six days. International delegations, primarily from Europe, are also expected. The competitions are to be held in the competition venues in Graubünden. The opening and closing ceremonies are scheduled to be also in Chur.

== Goals ==
An important goal is the implementation of the Convention on the Rights of Persons with Disabilities in Switzerland. It is planned that the partners of the World Games - from the host cities to the sponsors and contractors - will set an example in a charter and begin with concrete measures, such as creating jobs in the primary labour market. Around 30 people are involved in the drafting of the charter. They are to form an inclusion advisory board that will have an advisory function, but also monitor compliance with the charter in the organization of the World Games. The charter is to be presented in 2023. As part of the candidacy for the Special Olympics World Winter Games 2029, a basic study was prepared to improve inclusion in sport, housing and the working world in Switzerland.

== Sports and venues ==
The following nine sports and eight sports are debut will be held:

- Figure skating () (Chur)
- Floor hockey () (Chur)
- Snowshoeing () (Lenzerheide)
- Short-track speed skating () (Chur)
- Biathlon () (debut) (Lenzerheide)
- Alpine skiing () (Arosa)
- Cross-country skiing () (Lenzerheide)
- Snowboarding () (Arosa)
- Dancesport () (Lenzerheide)
- Indoor hockey () (Chur)
- Bobsleigh () (debut) (Lenzerheide)
- Snowskate () (debut)
- Ski mountaineering () (debut)
- Curling () (debut)
  - Ice stock sport () (debut)
- Ice rink () (debut)
- Bandy () (debut)

== Organisation ==
The board of the organization responsible for holding the games is preparing to start its operational activities at the beginning of 2024. The full board is composed of seven people. The president is Bruno Barth, the managing director of Special Olympics Switzerland. The office of vice president is held by the FDP politician and president of the World Games Association Urs Marti, who was very committed to awarding the games to Graubünden. He will remain in office as mayor of Chur until the end of 2024. The two board members Luana Bergamin and Stefan Frey come from the board of trustees of Special Olympics Switzerland. Lea Sandoz-Mey is committed to inclusion: as part of her high school diploma thesis, she founded the Inclusion 360 association shortly before the turn of the millennium and started a project in Zimbabwe in collaboration with the local Sunshine Project. The board also includes Hans-Willy Brockes, founder and managing director of the ESB Marketing Network with more than 550 partners. He is very well known and well connected in European sports sponsorship. By the end of 2023, one more person with cognitive impairment will be admitted to the Presidium.

Beat Ritschard was appointed Secretary General.

== Financing ==
The total budget is 38 million Swiss francs. Around three quarters of this will be financed by public bodies.

In the summer of 2023, the two chambers of the Swiss Federal Assembly approved 28.6 million Swiss francs for major sporting events of international importance for the years 2025 to 2029, of which 9.5 million francs are earmarked for the Special Olympics World Winter Games 2029. The other public partners of Special Olympics Switzerland had already pledged 19.1 million Swiss francs for the games at an earlier date, subject to a positive decision by the Federal Assembly. Of this sum, 1.8 million francs will come from the canton of Zurich's charitable fund, formerly known as the lottery fund. In Chur, voters approved a loan of 4.25 million francs for the hosting of the games by 7026 votes to 4155. This corresponds to a yes vote share of 62.84 percent.

The public funding of the games is thus secured. As soon as the text of the vote is available, the formal commitment can be obtained from Special Olympics International and an implementation agreement can be drawn up.

== Public relations ==
=== Logo ===
The logo was announced to be developed by the Nyon-based agency Twist by the end of 2023. Workshops for this began in 2023, with members of the Special Olympics Athletes Commission and employees of Twist's Studio Intégratif also participating.

=== Sponsorships ===
The mountain biker Nino Schurter is an ambassador for the games. He is an Olympic champion (2016), ten-time world champion, and eight-time winner of the UCI overall World Cup in cross country.
