= Next French legislative election =

- No later than June 2029

All 577 seats in the National Assembly 289 seats needed for a majority

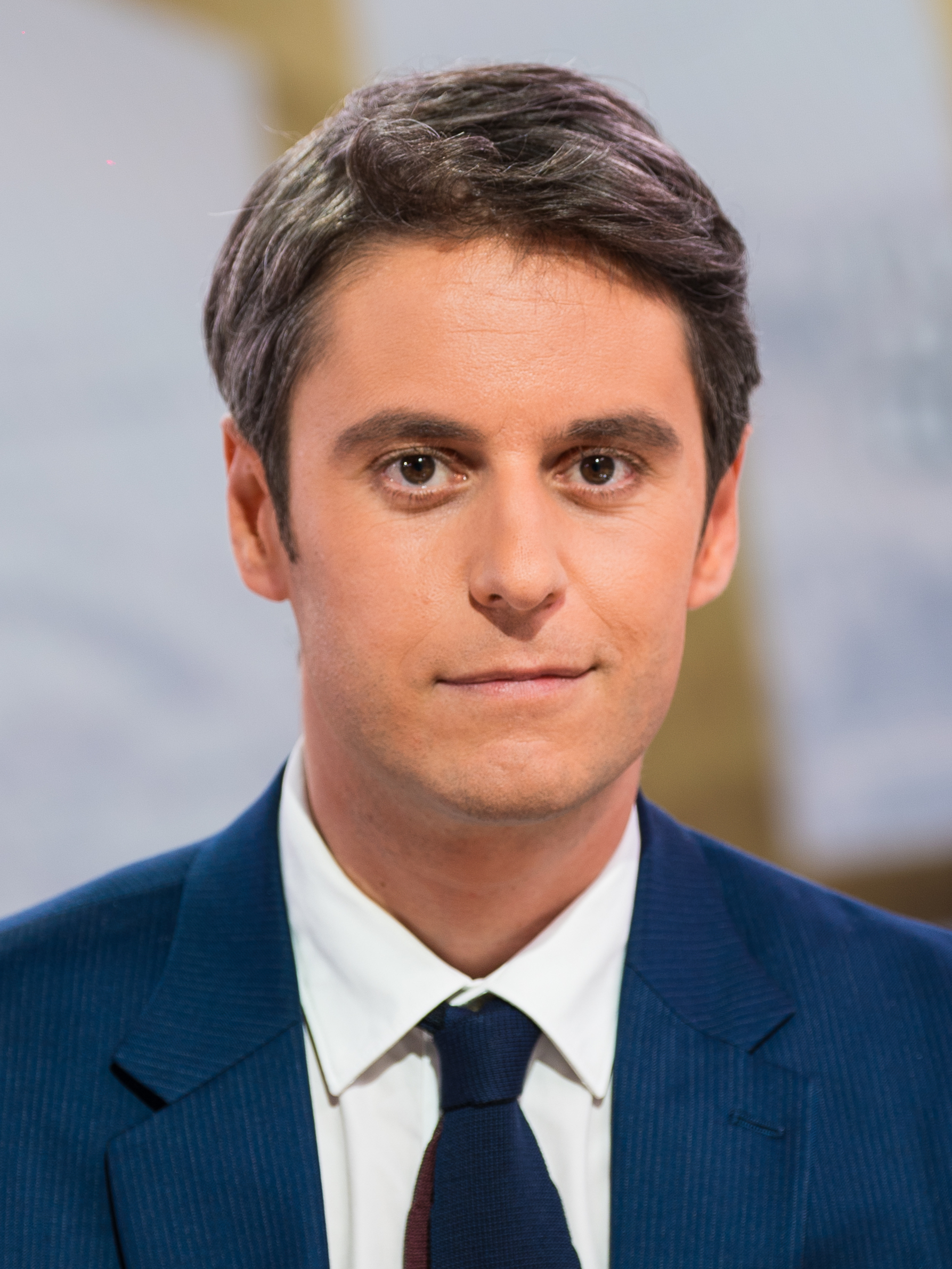

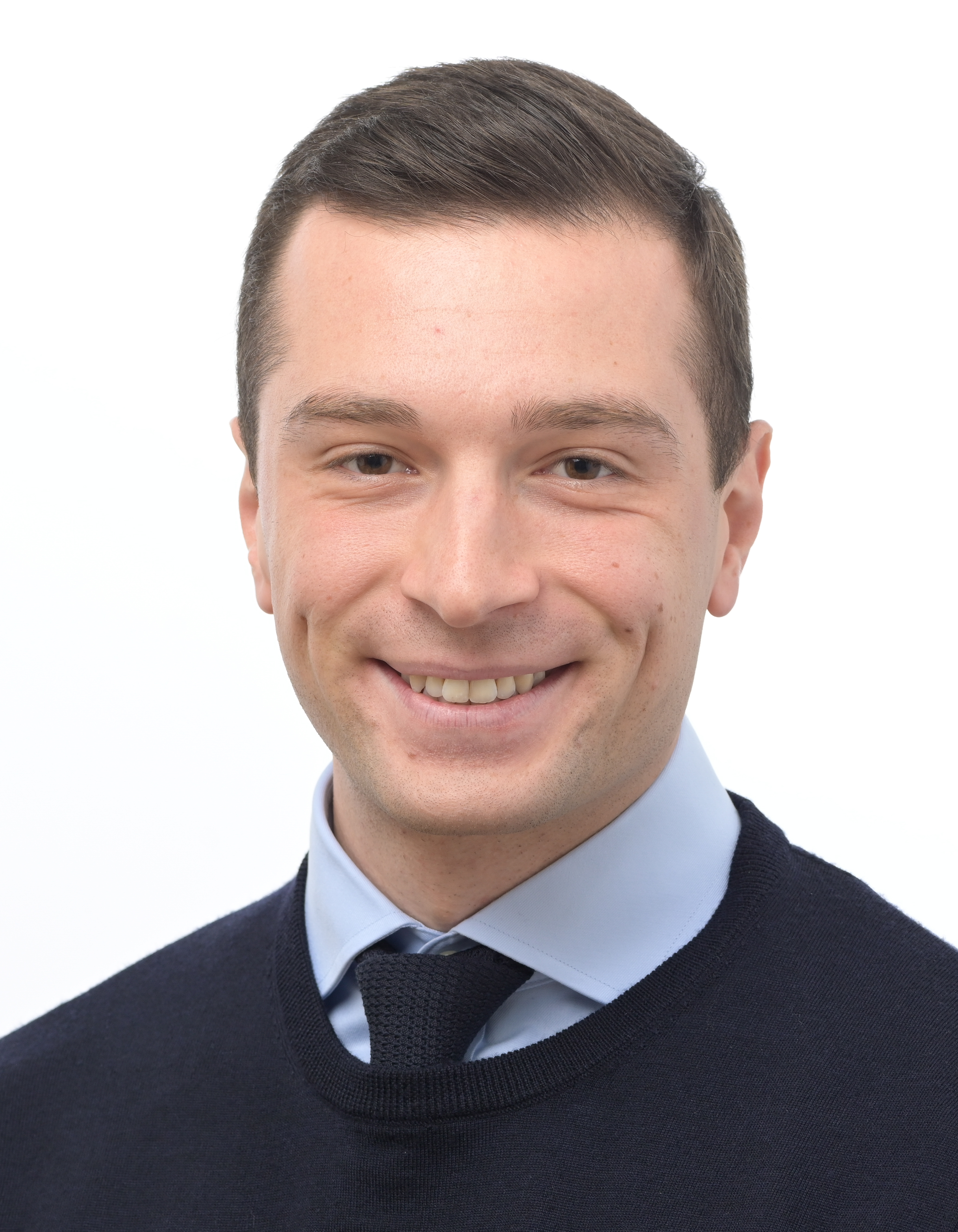

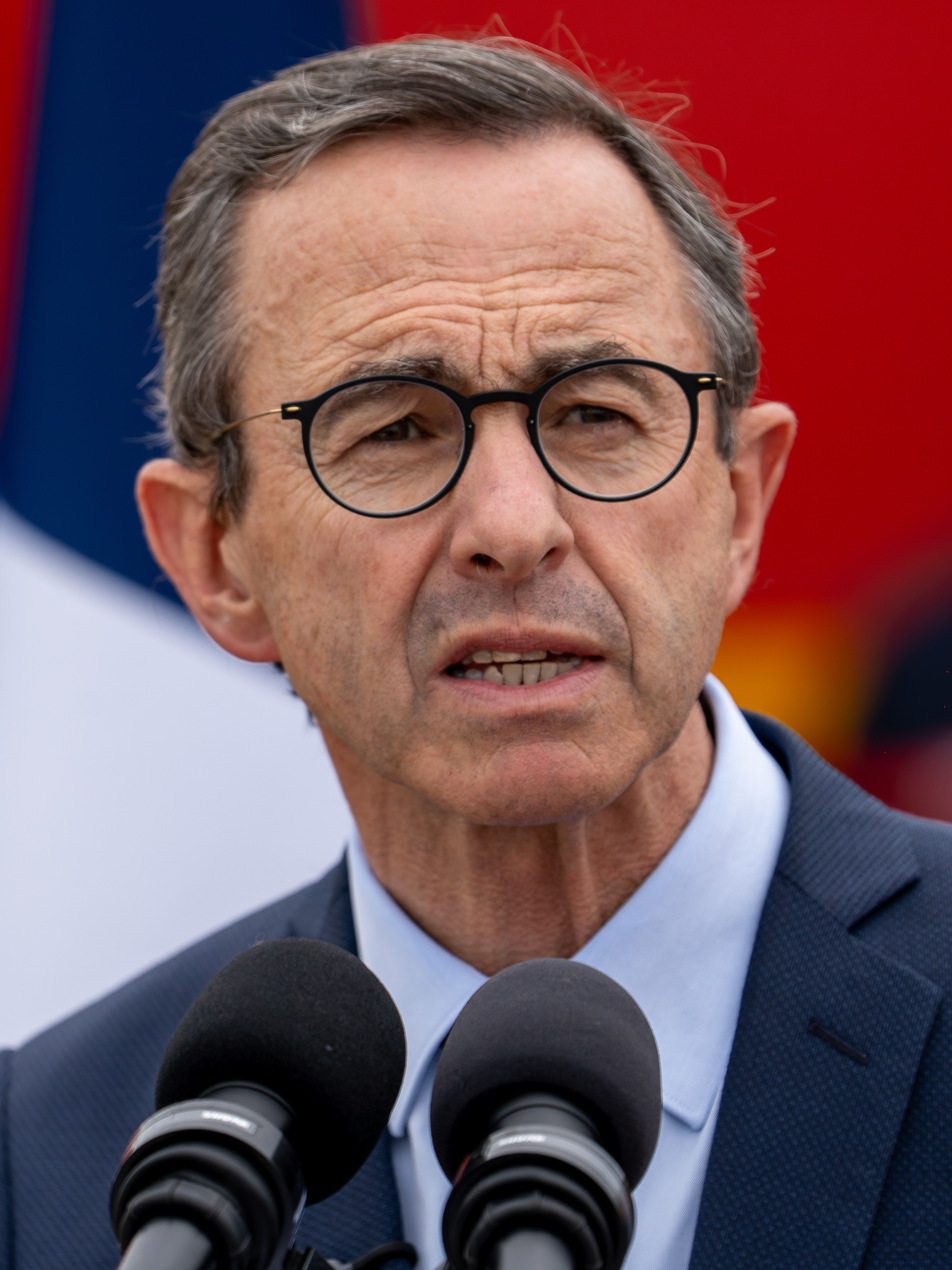
Leader	Collective leadership	Gabriel Attal
Alliance	NFP	Ensemble
Last election	195 seats, 28.2%	159 seats, 21.3%
Seats needed	▲94	▲130
Leader	Jordan Bardella	Bruno Retailleau
Party	RN/UDR	LR
Last election	142 seats, 33.2%	39 seats, 6.6%
Seats needed	▲147	▲250
Incumbent Prime Minister
Sébastien Lecornu
RE

Legislative elections are scheduled to be held in France by June 2029 to elect all 577 members of the 18th National Assembly of the Fifth French Republic. A snap election remains possible at any time under Article 12 of the Constitution.

== Background ==
=== 2024–2025 ===
The 2024 elections resulted in a hung parliament and four minority governments led by Michel Barnier, François Bayrou, and Sébastien Lecornu, all being appointed by Emmanuel Macron. Both Barnier and Bayrou's governments collapsed as a result of confidence votes. Lecornu initially resigned 14 hours after presenting his first government, before being reappointed by Macron four days later. The absence of a stable majority means the government constantly lives under the threat of a vote of no confidence as well as losing parliamentary votes.

=== Lecornu II ===
Six days after formation, the second Lecornu government survived its first vote of no-confidence, which only got 271 votes instead of the 289 necessary. Successive no-confidence votes in January 2026 were also survived.

With the resolution of the 2024–2025 French political crisis, polling agencies shifted their focus away from legislative voting intentions, instead tracking the 2026 French municipal elections and the 2027 French presidential election.

Whether snap elections will be called remains a topic of ongoing speculation. After the 2027 presidential election, it could make sense strategically for the incoming president to dissolve the Assembly after taking office, either to avoid a gridlocked government or to ride their political momentum to secure more seats in the Assembly. This would place the next legislative vote in or around June 2027. Conversely, a snap election could be called a few weeks before the presidential election to prevent snap elections from being called in the following 12 months, per constitutional limits. The President has reportedly considered doing this to complicate the rise of National Rally (RN) and La France Insoumise (LFI), however has publicly rejected this strategy.

== Electoral system ==
The 577 members of the National Assembly, known as deputies, are elected for five years by a two-round system in single-member constituencies. A candidate who receives an absolute majority of valid votes and a vote total greater than 25% of the registered electorate is elected in the first round. If no candidate reaches this threshold, a runoff election is held between the top two candidates plus any other candidate who received a vote total greater than 12.5% of registered voters. The candidate who receives the most votes in the second round is elected.

== Opinion polls ==
Election polls for the 2029 French parliamentary election

Opinion polling for the next French legislative election
Polling firm	Date	Sample size	EXG	NFP				DVG	ECO	ENS	DVC	LR	DVD	DLF	RN and allies		REC	Others	Lead
Polling firm	Date	Sample size	EXG	LFI	LE	PCF	PS	DVG	ECO	ENS	DVC	LR	DVD	DLF	UDR	RN	REC	Others	Lead
—N/a	10 Oct 2025	Second Lecornu government formed																	
Ifop	7–8 Oct 2025	1,386	1%	24%				4%	–	14%	–	12%	3%	1%	35%		4%	2%	11%
Ifop	7–8 Oct 2025	1,386	1%	8%	19%			3%	–	13%	–	11%	2.5%	1%	36%		3.5%	2%	19%
Ifop	7–8 Oct 2025	1,386	1%	10%		17%		3%	–	13%	–	11%	2%	1%	36%		4%	2%	19%
OpinionWay	6–7 Oct 2025	1,012	2%	24%				–	–	16%	–	13%	–	–	34%		5%	6%	10%
OpinionWay	6–7 Oct 2025	1,012	2%	13%			13%	–	–	15%	–	13%	–	–	33%		5%	6%	18%
OpinionWay	6–7 Oct 2025	1,012	2%	9%	18%			–	–	14%	–	12%	–	–	33%		6%	6%	15%
—N/a	5–6 Oct 2025	First Lecornu government dissolved																	
—N/a	8–9 Sep 2025	Bayrou government dissolved; First Lecornu government formed																	
Ifop	5–8 Sep 2025	1,089	1.5%	24%				5%	–	14%	–	12%	2.5%	2%	34%		3.5%	1.5%	10%
Ifop	5–8 Sep 2025	1,089	1%	9%	19%			3%	–	14%	–	12%	2%	2%	33%		4%	1%	14%
Cluster17	5–7 Sep 2025	1,133	1%	25%				5.5%	–	14%	1%	13%	2%	1.5%	29%		4%	4%	4%
Cluster17	5–7 Sep 2025	1,133	1%	11%	16%			3%	–	13%	1%	13%	2%	1.5%	29%		4.5%	5%	13%
Cluster17	5–7 Sep 2025	1,133	1%	14%		14%		3%	–	12.5%	1%	12%	3%	1.5%	29%		4%	5%	15%
Harris	4–5 Sep 2025	2,017	1%	26%				6%	–	16%	–	10%	–	–	33%		5%	3%	7%
Harris	4–5 Sep 2025	2,017	1%	10%	19%			4%	–	16%	–	10%	–	–	33%		5%	3%	14%
Ifop	29 Aug–1 Sep 2025	1,369	1%	25%				5%	–	15%	–	13%	2%	1.5%	33%		4%	0.5%	8%
Ifop	29 Aug–1 Sep 2025	1,369	1%	11%		15%		4%	–	15%	–	13%	3%	1.5%	32%		3.5%	1%	17%
Elabe	28–29 Aug 2025	1,563	2%	23.5%				6.5%	–	14%	–	10.5%	2.5%	–	31.5%		5%	4.5%	8.0%
Elabe	28–29 Aug 2025	1,563	1.5%	10%	16.5%			5%	–	13.5%	–	10.5%	3%	–	31%		4.5%	4.5%	14.5%
Elabe	3–5 Jun 2025	1,496	2%	21%				6.5%	–	15.5%	–	10%	3.5%	–	32.5%		3%	6%	11.5%
Elabe	3–5 Jun 2025	1,496	1.5%	10%	16%			3.5%	–	15.5%	–	10.5%	3%	–	33%		2.5%	4.5%	17%
Ifop	3–4 Jun 2025	1,385	0.5%	21%				7%	–	18%	–	11%	2%	1%	1%	35%	2%	1.5%	14%
Ifop	3–4 Jun 2025	1,385	1%	11%		13%		4%	–	18%	–	11%	1.5%	1.5%	0.5%	35%	2%	1.5%	17%
Ifop	3–4 Jun 2025	1,385	0.5%	9%	5%	3%	12%	3%	–	16%	–	10%	2%	1%	0.5%	34%	2.5%	1.5%	18%
Ifop	5–6 Feb 2025	1,377	1%	14%			13%	2%	–	15%	–	13%	1%	1%	1%	35%	3%	1%	21%
Ifop	5–6 Feb 2025	1,377	1.5%	8%	19%			2.5%	–	15%	–	12%	1%	1%	0.5%	35%	3%	1.5%	16%
—N/a	4–13 Dec 2024	Barnier government dissolved; Bayrou government formed																	
—N/a	5 Sep 2024	Beginning of French political crisis: Attal government dissolved; Barnier government formed																	
2024 Election Results	30 Jun 2024	—N/a	1.14%	28.21%				1.57%	0.57%	21.28%	1.22%	6.57%	3.60%	0.28%	3.96%	29.26%	0.75%	1.60%	1.05%
