= Norge Idag =

Norwegian newspaper

- Type: Weekly newspaper
- Owner(s): Kristenfolkets pressestøttefond (13.7%); Finn Jarle Sæle (5.2%); Inger Marie Volstad (2.4%); Erlend D Skumsnes Sæle (2.1%); Other Shareholders (76.3%)
- Editor: Finn Jarle Sæle
- Founded: 1999
- Political alignment: Christian conservative
- Headquarters: Bergen, Norway
- Circulation: 11,574 (2017)
- Website: idag.no

Norge Idag (literally "Norway Today") is a Norwegian Christian conservative weekly newspaper published in Bergen that was founded in 1999. The editor-in-chief is Finn Jarle Sæle.

== Publishing ==
The newspaper receives financial press support from the Norwegian state, and has a circulation of about 11,000.

In cooperation with the television channel Visjon Norge, Norge Idag bought former cinema Forum Kino on Danmarksplass in Bergen to be used as a centre for evangelism.

Influenced by American evangelicalism, the newspaper was the only one in Norway to largely support Donald Trump during his presidency. The newspaper has also been described as Christian Zionist.

== Controversies ==
Among the editorial positions taken by the newspaper is opposition to legalizing gay marriage and gay adoption. The paper also served as a mouthpiece for Jan-Aage Torp when he encouraged Christians to use directed prayer in order to oust gays from positions of power. This call for a prayer campaign was discussed in a number of media, including Dagbladet.
