= 1946 in Norway =

- Centuries: 18th; 19th; 20th; 21st
- Decades: 1920s; 1930s; 1940s; 1950s; 1960s
- See also: List of years in Norway

Events in the year 1946 in Norway.

== Incumbents ==
- Monarch – Haakon VII.
- Prime Minister – Einar Gerhardsen (Labour Party)

== Events ==
- 1 February – Trygve Lie is selected as the first United Nations Secretary General
- 6 December – The Home Guard was established.
- Årdal og Sunndal Verk is established as a state-run corporation with the task of finishing unfinished industrial facilities started by the German occupational forces.

== Popular culture ==
=== Sports ===
- Godtfred Holmvang, decathlete and skier, is awarded the Egebergs Ærespris, for athletes who excel in more than one sport.

== Notable births ==
=== January ===
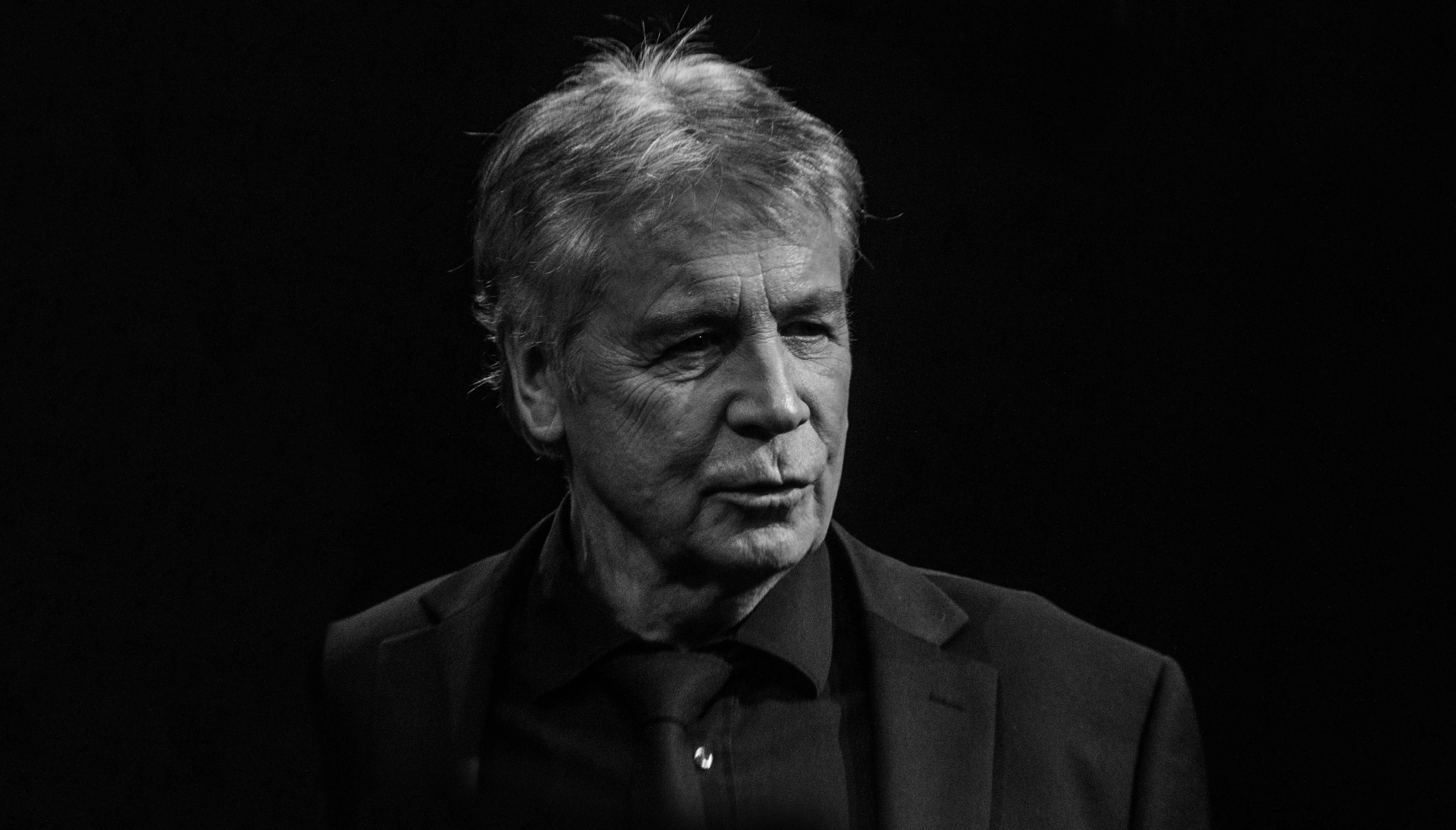
Knut Lystad

- 3 January – Gunnar Eggen, harness racer (died 2024).
- 8 January – Åse Klundelien, politician
- 10 January – Bernhard Riksfjord, politician
- 17 January – Finn Kristian Marthinsen, politician
- 18 January – Herbjørn Skogstad, illustrator.
- 20 January – Lisbeth Holand, politician
- 21 January – Bjørn Skogstad Aamo, economist and politician
- 22 January – Svein Kristensen, civil servant
- 31 January – Knut Lystad, actor, singer, translator, screenwriter, comedian and director

=== February ===
Knut Vollebæk

- 1 February – Øystein Rottem, philologist, literary historian and literary critic (died 2004).
- 2 February – Lasse Qvigstad, jurist
- 4 February – Anders Talleraas, politician
- 8 February – Karin Kjølmoen, politician
- 11 February – Knut Vollebæk, diplomat and politician
- 12 February
  - Ingrid Hadler, orienteer and World Champion.
  - Ulf Thoresen, harness racer (died 1992)
- 17 February – Helge Jordal, actor and singer
- 18 February – Torny Pedersen, politician
- 19 February – Tore Schei, Chief Justice of the Supreme Court of Norway
- 20 February – Ole Nafstad, rower and Olympic silver medallist
- 21 February
  - Marianne Heske, visual artist.
  - Knut Hove, veterinarian
- 24 February – Sverre Stub, diplomat

=== March ===
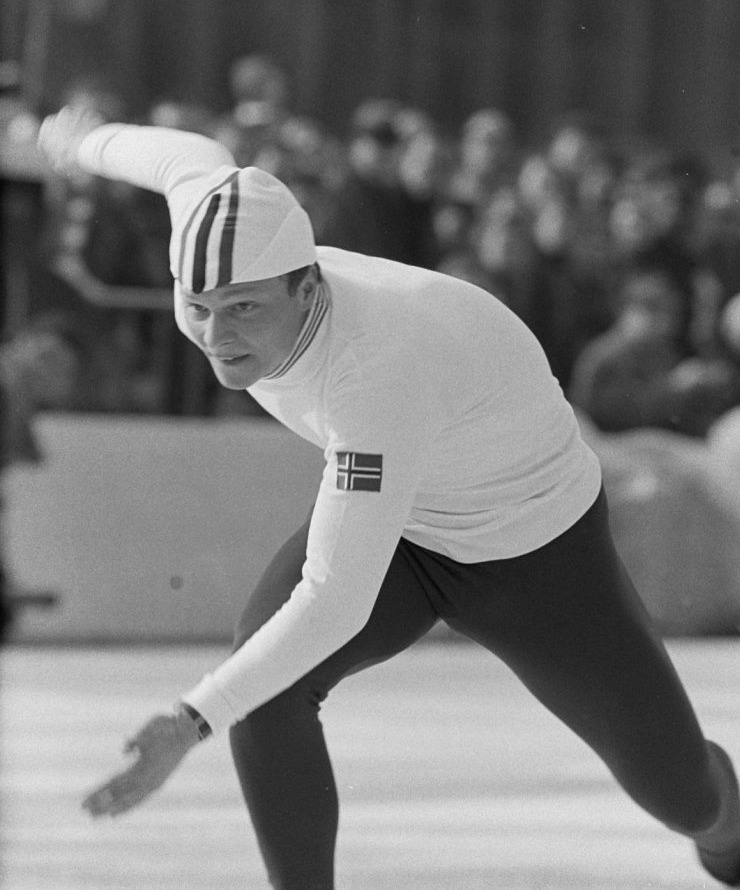
Roar Grønvold

- 4 March – Harald Rensvik, civil servant
- 5 March
  - Klaus Hagerup, author, translator, screenwriter, actor and director (died 2018)
  - Bernt Hagtvet, political scientist.
  - Oddvar Stenstrøm, journalist and television host
- 9 March – Britt Harkestad, politician
- 14 March – Knut Hanselmann, politician (died 2022)
- 16 March – Sigmund Groven, classical harmonica player
- 19 March – Roar Grønvold, speed skater and Olympic silver medallist
- 21 March – Svein Sturla Hungnes, actor, theatre director and instructor
- 23 March – Jon Reinertsen, handball player
- 28 March – Marianne Gullestad, social anthropologist (died 2008)

=== April ===
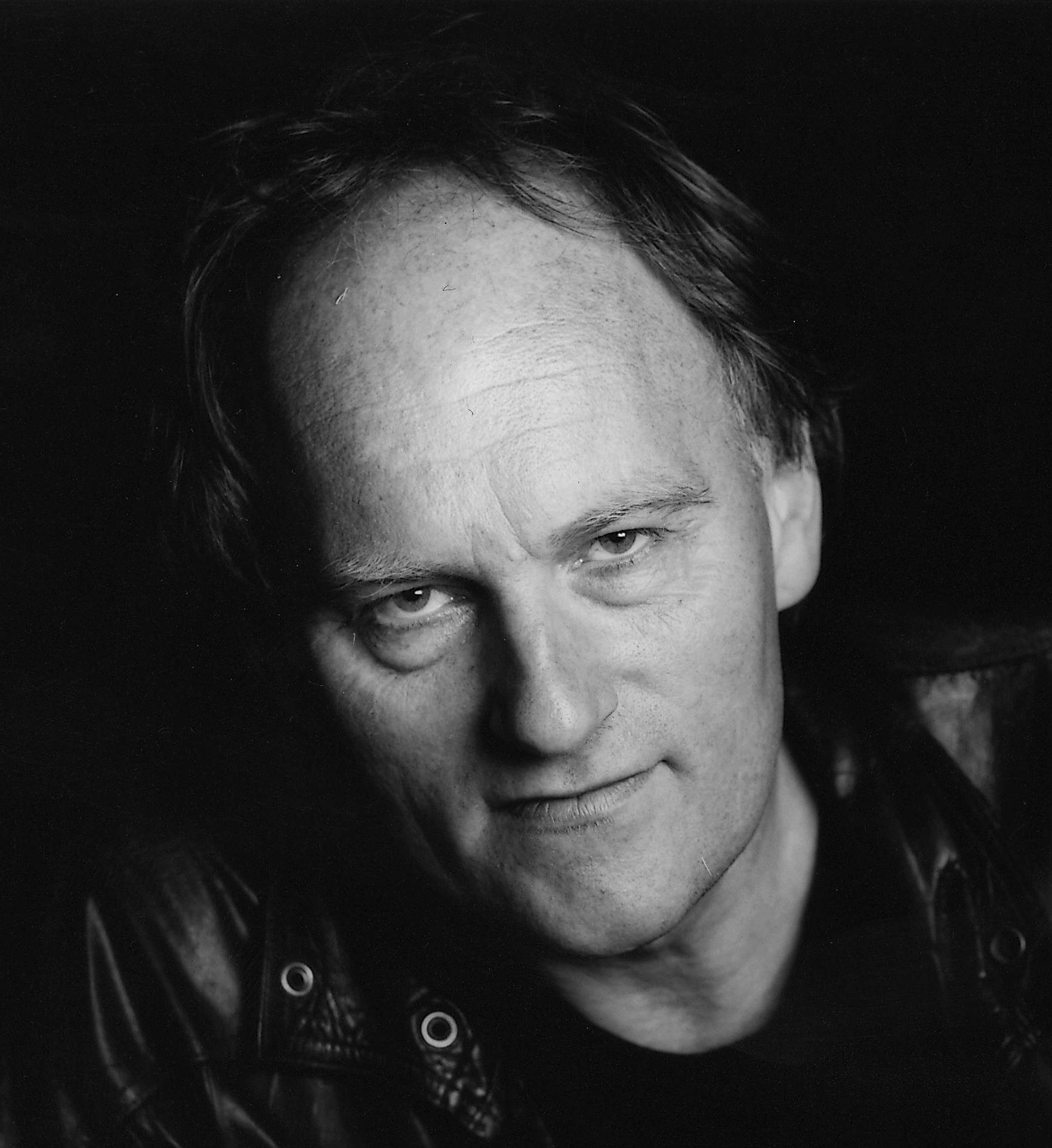
Erling Kittelsen

- 8 April – Åge Korsvold, businessperson
- 10 April – Erling Kittelsen, poet, novelist, children's writer, playwright and translator.
- 18 April – Per Erik Monsen, politician (died 2008)
- 21 April – Inge Hansen, handball player
- 27 April – Tanja Heiberg Storm, diplomat (died 2023).
- 30 April – Lars Vikør, linguist

=== May ===
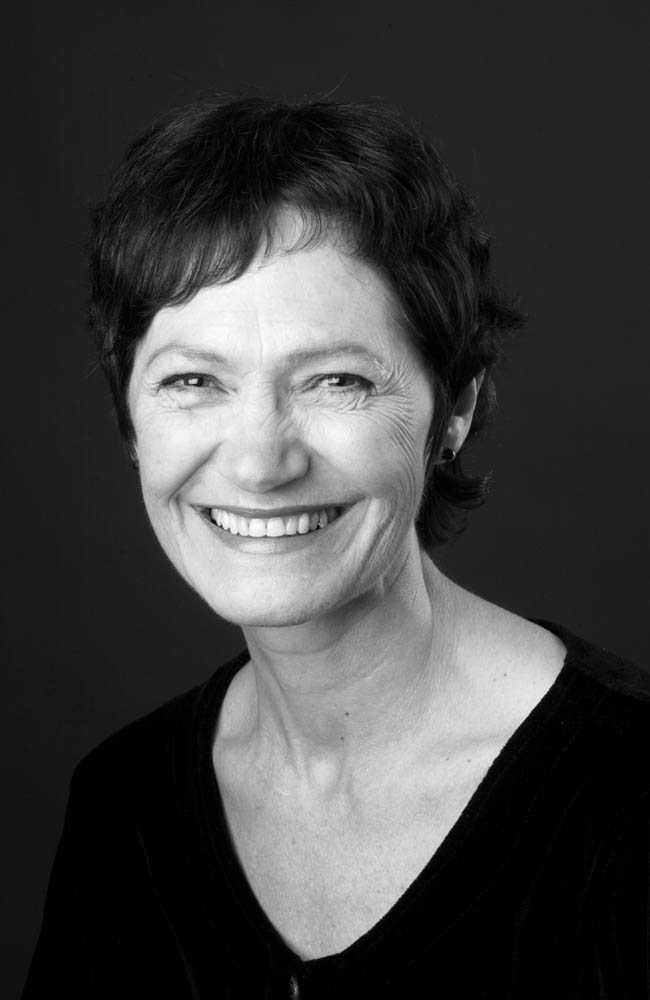
Laila Stien

- 4 May – Gunnar Jordfald, civil servant
- 5 May
  - Svein Jarvoll, poet and writer (died 2026).
  - Svend Wam, film director (died 2017)
- 16 May
  - Laila Stien, novelist, poet and translator.
  - Olav Anton Thommessen, composer
  - Willy Ustad, novelist
- 18 May – Liv Sandven, politician
- 21 May
  - Pål Bye, handball player
  - Arne Fliflet, jurist and civil servant
- 23 May – Åge Starheim, politician

=== June ===
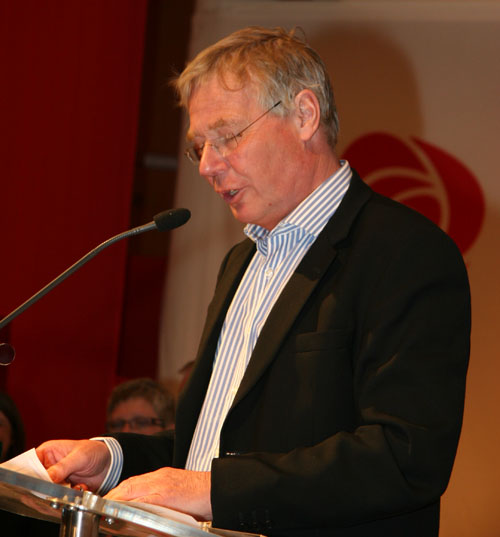
Rune Gerhardsen

- 10 June – Sverre J. Hoddevik, politician
- 11 June
  - Gunn Imsen, educationalist
  - Jan Petersen, politician and Minister
- 13 June – Rune Gerhardsen, politician and sports leader (died 2021).
- 14 June – Alf Saltveit, writer (died 2022).
- 21 June
  - Trond Kirkvaag, comedian, actor, imitator, screenwriter, author, director and television host (died 2007)
  - Harald Norvik, businessperson
- 23 June –
  - Kjell Bjørndalen, trade unionist.
  - Svein Thøgersen, rower and Olympic silver medallist.

=== July ===
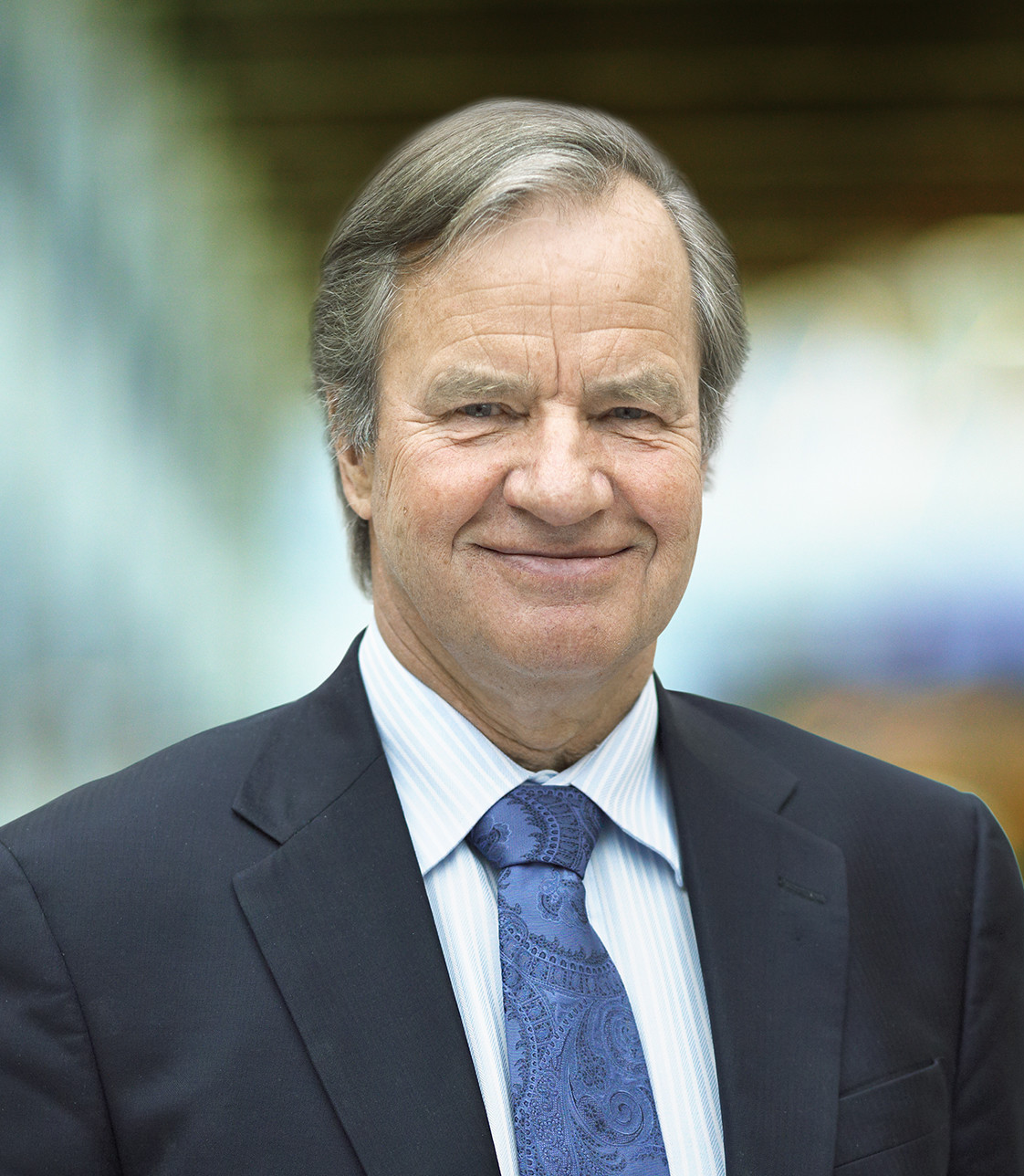
Bjørn Kjos

- 11 July – Kim Traavik, diplomat and politician.
- 12 July – Bernt Bull, politician and organizational leader.
- 13 July – Jon Westborg, diplomat.
- 18 July
  - Gerd Dvergsdal, politician
  - Bjørn Kjos, aviator, lawyer, and business magnate.
  - Svein Ludvigsen, politician and Minister
  - Victor D. Norman, economist and politician.
- 19 July – Odd L. Fosseidbråten, civil servant and diplomat.
- 22 July – Jan Grund, academic

=== August ===
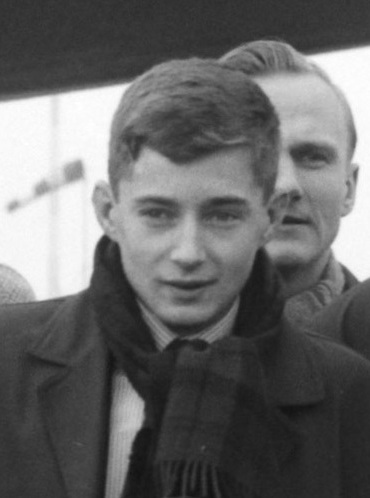
Ola Dybwad-Olsen

- 2 August – Ivar Frønes, sociologist
- 4 August – Ola Dybwad-Olsen, international soccer player
- 7 August – Øystein Hedstrøm, politician.
- 13 August – Arild Underdal, political scientist (died 2025).
- 14 August
  - Bjørn Kruse, composer.
  - Gunn Vigdis Olsen-Hagen, politician (died 1989)
- 15 August – Tone Danielsen, actress.
- 18 August – Arild Braastad, diplomat

=== September ===
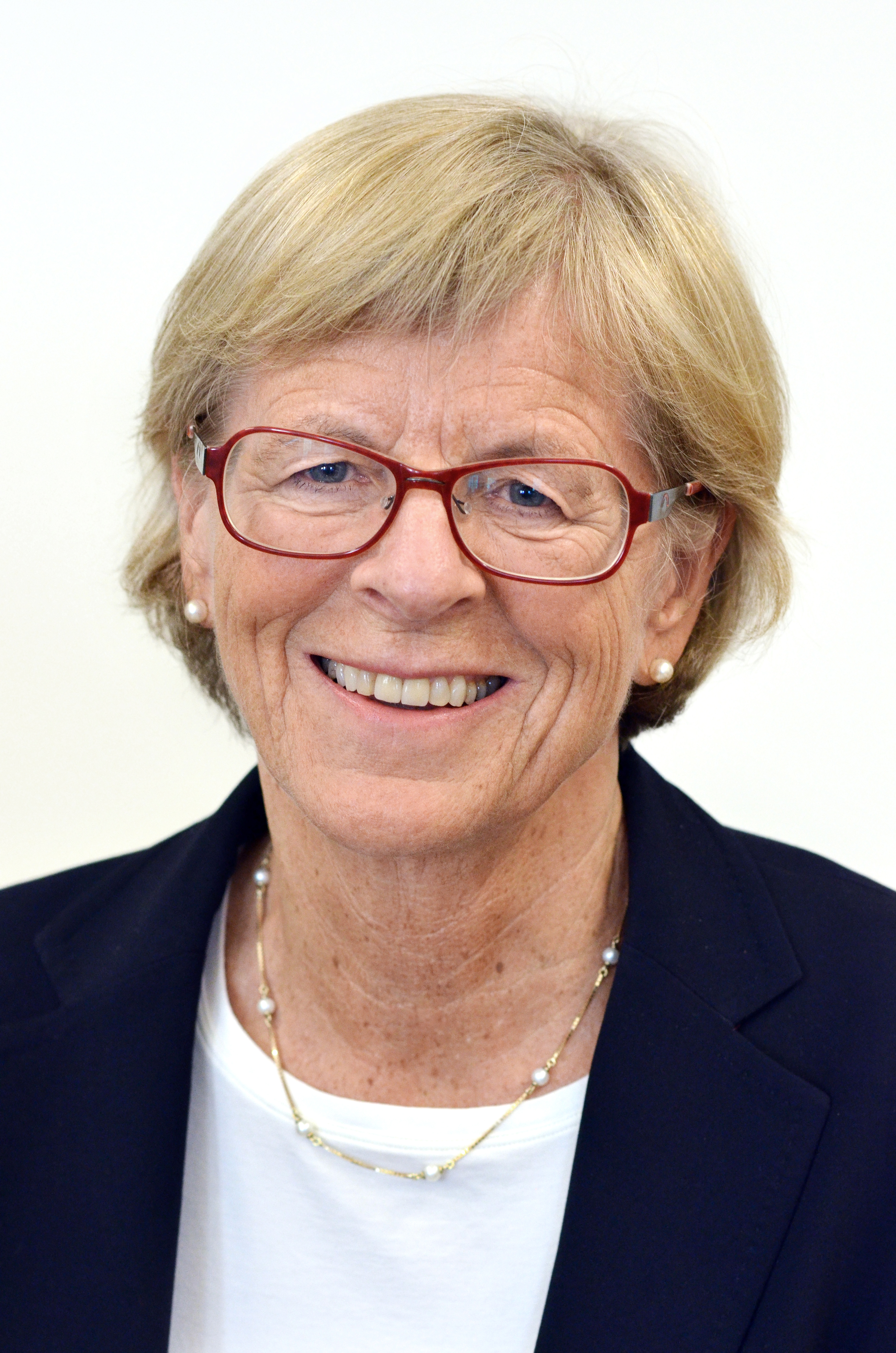
Tove Strand

- 5 September – Sigurd Allern, media theorist and professor of journalism
- 6 September – Steinar Bjølbakk, ice hockey player (died 2024).
- 8 September – Arent M. Henriksen, politician (died 2024).
- 14 September – Kjell Gjerseth, journalist (died 2025).
- 15 September – Bente Sætrang, textile artist.
- 16 September – Trond Bergh, economic historian
- 23 September – John Haugland, rally driver
- 28 September – Tarald Osnes Brautaset, diplomat
- 29 September – Tove Strand, civil servant and politician

=== October ===
- 7 October – Svein Aaser, businessperson
- 13 October – Sven-Erik Svedman, diplomat and politician
- 22 October – Eirik Glenne, diplomat
- 27 October – Steinar Gullvåg, politician
- 28 October – Per Rom, sprinter
- 31 October – Jo Inge Bjørnebye, ski jumper (died 2013).

=== November ===
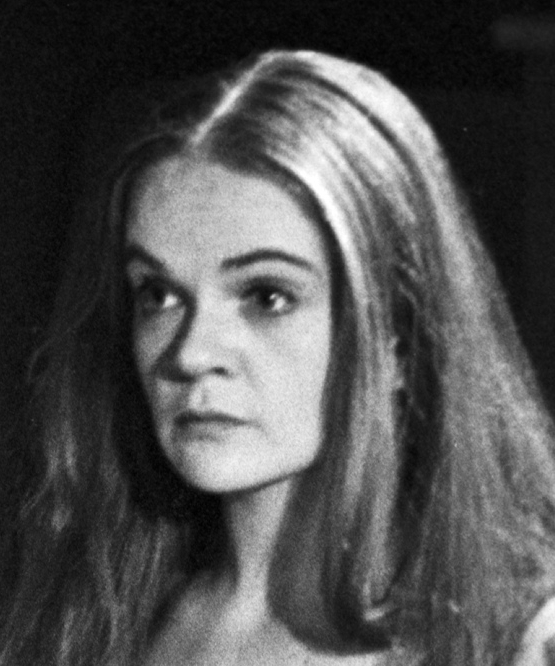
Anne Marit Jacobsen

- 1 November – Jørgen Åsland, politician
- 7 November
  - Sten Egil Bjørnø, politician
  - Anne Marit Jacobsen, actress.
- 9 November – Gunnar Fatland, politician
- 18 November – Ulf Magnussen, handball player
- 23 November – Agnes Buen Garnås, traditional folk singer
- 25 November – Harald Tyrdal, handball player

=== December ===
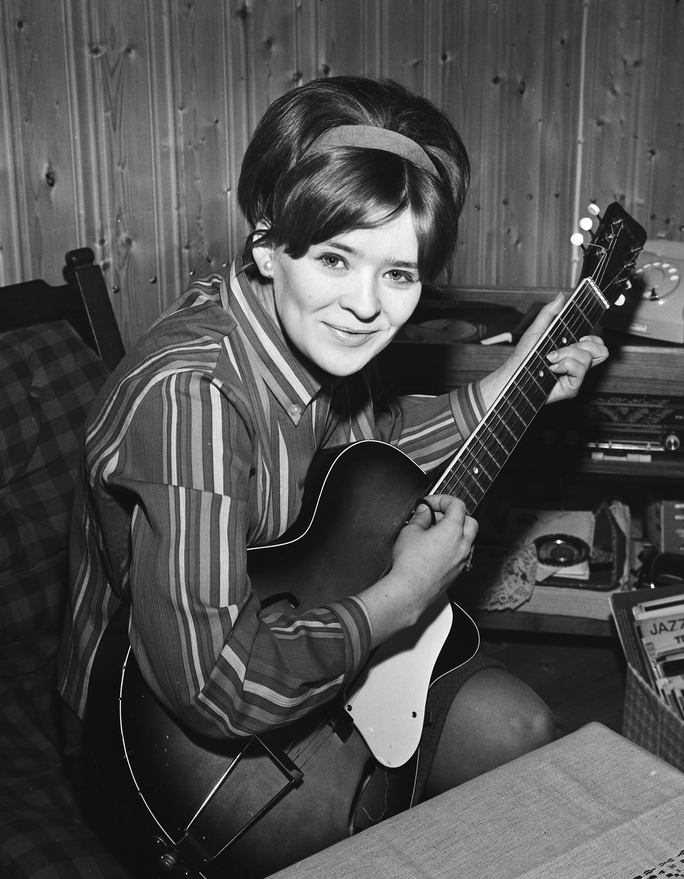
Kirsti Sparboe

- 7 December
  - Haakon Baardsøn Hjelde, diplomat
  - Kirsti Sparboe, singer and actress
  - Lars Wilhelmsen, civil servant
- 11 December
  - Torbjørn Frøysnes, diplomat and politician
  - Dagfinn Sundsbø, politician
- 14 December – Ingse Stabel, judge
- 24 December – Vigdis Moe Skarstein, librarian.
- 29 December – Bernhard Ramstad, actor, theatre instructor and director

=== Full date unknown ===
- Olav Terje Bergo, newspaper editor
- Svein Koningen, painter
- Torleiv Maseng, engineer
- Oddbjørn Nordset, civil servant and politician
- Arvid Noe, sailor and truck driver, one of the first non-Africans known to have died from AIDS (died 1976)
- Arne Nore, businessperson

== Notable deaths ==
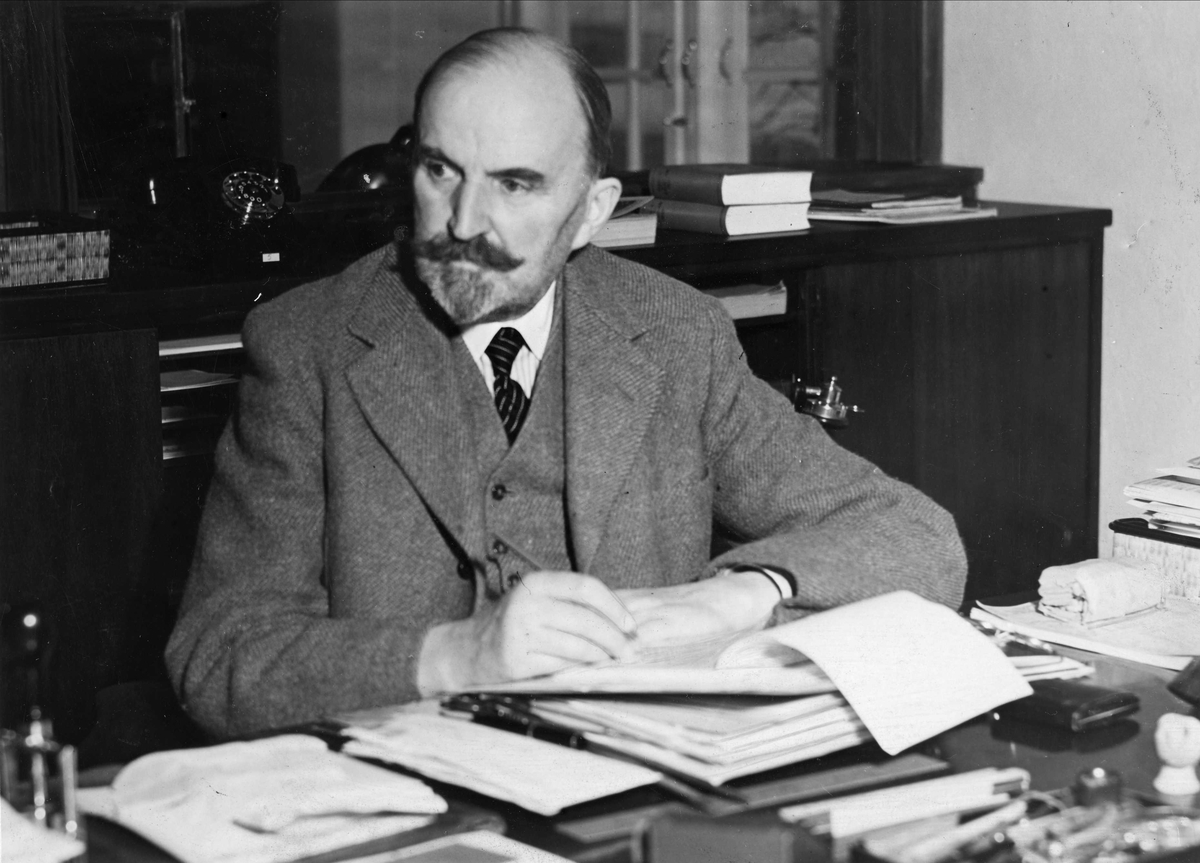
Hans Aall

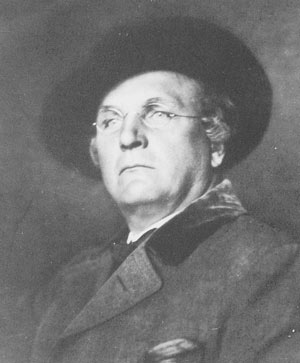
Egil Eide

- 8 January – Rasmus Pedersen Thu, photographer (born 1864)
- 14 January – Mette Bull, actress (born 1876)
- 23 January – Bernt Tunold, painter (born 1877)
- 13 February – Johan Throne Holst, industrialist and politician (born 1868)
- 22 March – Ragnvald Bødtker, engineer (born 1859)
- 23 March – Ingolf Davidsen, gymnast and Olympic silver medallist (born 1893)
- 4 April – Klaus Sletten, organizational worker, editor and politician (born 1877)
- 30 April – Olav Gunnarsson Helland, Hardanger fiddle maker (born 1875)
- 5 May – Theodor Dahl, journalist and fiction writer (born 1886).
- 16 May – Søren Berg Sørensen Moen, politician (born 1899)
- 22 May – Ronald Fangen, journalist and author (born 1895).
- 29 June – Edle Hartmann, writer (born 1862).
- 21 August – Rudolf Gundersen, speed skater (born 1879)
- 16 September – Margit Schiøtt, politician (born 1889)
- 13 October – Ole Sæther, rifle shooter and Olympic gold medallist (born 1870)
- 6 November – Hans Aall, librarian and museum director (born 1869).
- 11 November – Egill Reimers, architect, sailor and Olympic gold medallist (born 1878)
- 26 November – Ola Bertelsen, jurist and politician (born 1864)
- 13 December – Egil Eide, actor and director (born 1868)

=== Full date unknown ===
- Gunnar Horn, petroleum geologist and Arctic explorer
- Ambrotius Olsen Lindvig, politician and Minister (born 1855)
