= 1864 in Norway =

- Centuries: 17th; 18th; 19th; 20th; 21st
- Decades: 1840s; 1850s; 1860s; 1870s; 1880s
- See also: 1864 in Sweden; List of years in Norway

Events in the year 1864 in Norway.

== Incumbents ==
- Monarch: Charles IV.
- First Minister: Frederik Stang

== Events ==
- 19 April – The last public execution in Christiania took place at Etterstad, attended by about 5,000 spectators.

== Arts and literature ==
- Ja, vi elsker, composed by Rikard Nordraak, with lyrics by Bjørnstjerne Bjørnson, becomes the (de facto) Norwegian national anthem.

== Births ==
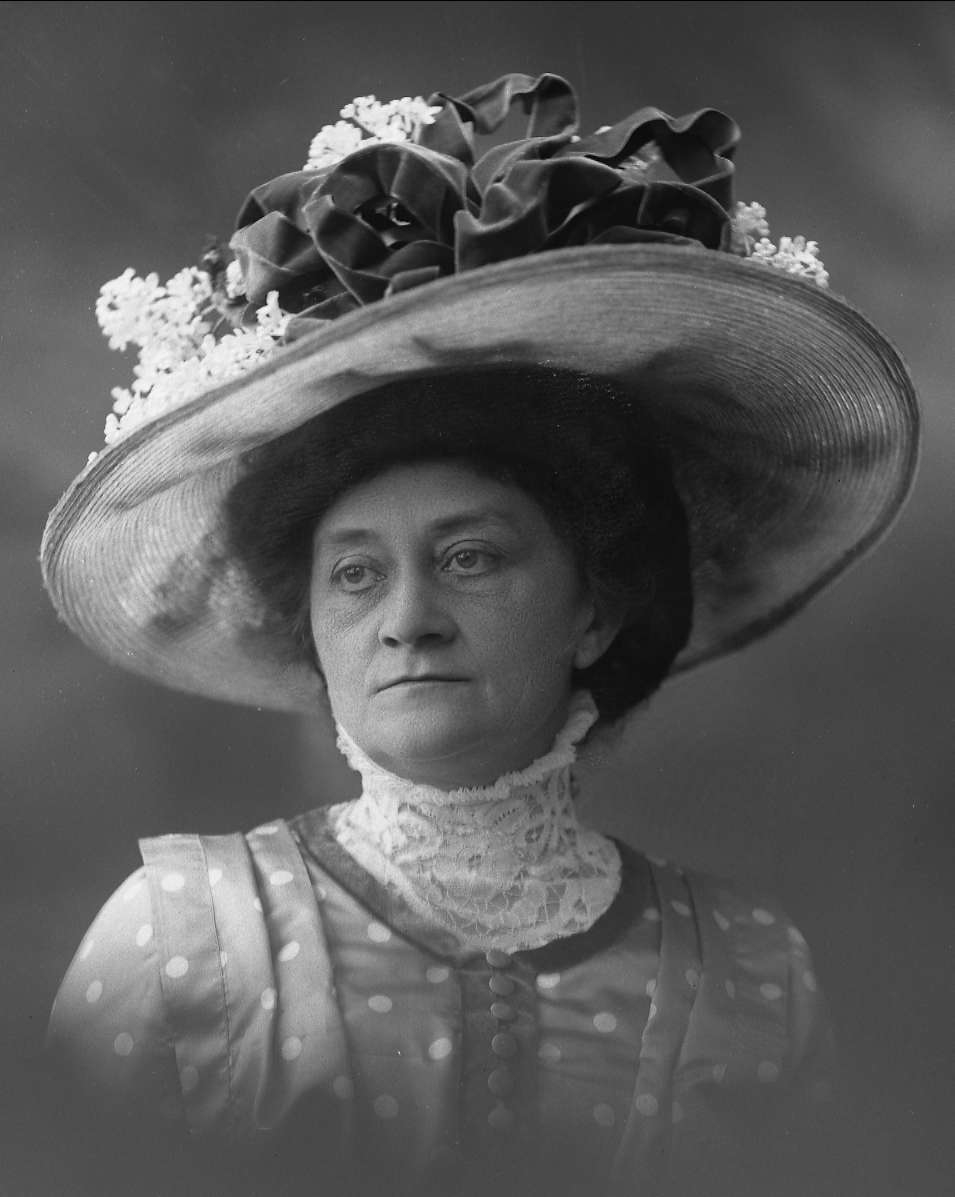
Hildur Andersen

- 7 January – Rasmus Pedersen Thu, photographer (died 1946)
- 24 February – Anders Buen, typographer, newspaper editor, trade unionist and politician (died 1933)
- 10 March – Rolfine Absalonsen, actress (died 1933)
- 13 March – James C. M. Hanson, Norwegian American librarian and author (died 1943)
- 15 March – Johan Halvorsen, composer, conductor and violinist (died 1935)
- 21 March – Svend Rasmussen Svendsen, Norwegian American impressionist artist (died 1945)
- 25 May – Hildur Andersen, pianist and music pedagogue (died 1956).
- 7 June – Emil Biorn, Norwegian American sculptor and artist (died 1935)
- 22 June – Hans Jørgen Darre-Jenssen, engineer, politician and Minister (died 1950)
- 8 July – Marie Hauge, painter (died 1931)
- 10 October – Ola Bertelsen, jurist and politician (died 1946)
- 19 September – Ragna Wettergreen, stage and film actress (died 1958)
- 1 December – Carsten Borchgrevink, polar explorer (died 1934)
- 14 December – Anders Svor, sculptor (died 1929)

=== Full date unknown ===
- Gulbrand Hagen, Norwegian American newspaper editor and writer (died 1919)
- Fredrik Ludvig Konow, politician and Minister (died 1954)
- Johan Wilhelm Normann Munthe, soldier and art collector (died 1935)
- Christian Lange Rolfsen, politician and Minister (died 1934)
- Nils Collett Vogt, poet (died 1937)
- Johannes B. Wist (died 1923) Norwegian American journalist and author.

== Deaths ==
- 12 January – Lars Rasch, jurist and politician (born 1797)
- 20 March - Broder Knudtzon, merchant and politician (born 1788).
- 7 June – Rolf Olsen, politician (born 1818)
- 24 November – Ulrik Frederik Cappelen, jurist and politician (born 1797)

=== Full date unknown ===
- Ola Antonson Holsen, politician (born 1808)
