= Ellen Hambro =

Norwegian civil servant (born 1964)

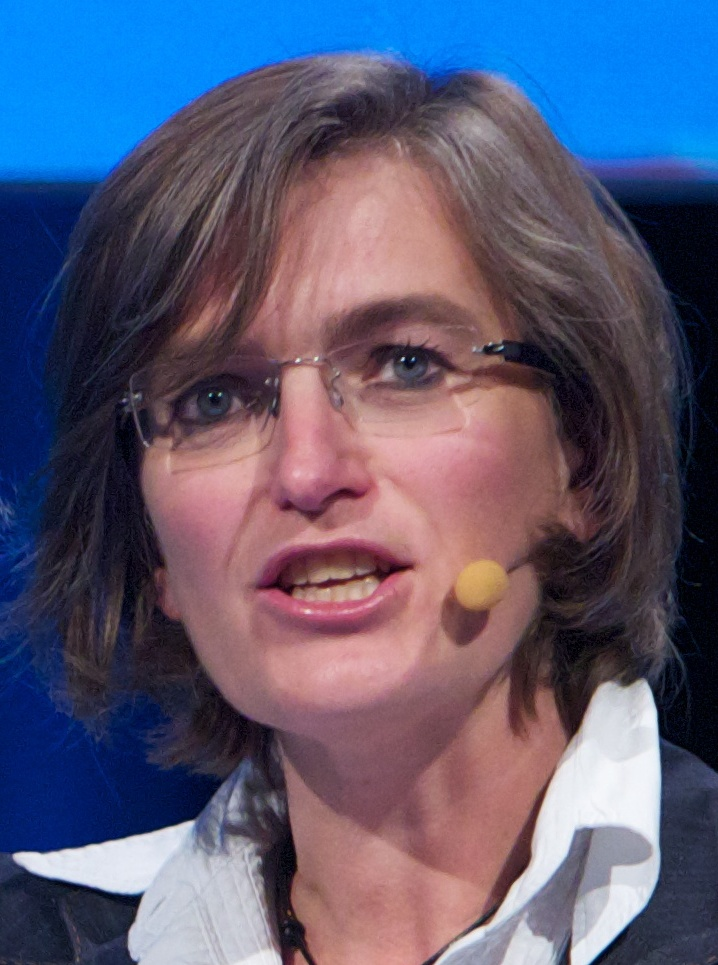
Ellen Hambro at Zero 2010 conference

Ellen Christine Hambro (born 20 July 1964) is a Norwegian civil servant.

== Early career ==
Hambro earned a law degree (cand.jur.) from the University of Oslo in 1991. She joined the Ministry of the Environment the same year and in 1997 became head of her department, where she worked on waste management issues. Norway's industrial employers credited her with raising the percentage of waste recycled from almost nothing to about 70%. In 2004 she moved to the Ministry of Agriculture and Food, where she worked as deputy under-secretary of state.

== Directorship ==
Since 1 January 2007 she has directed Norway's Climate and Pollution Agency (before 2010, called the Pollution Control Authority). She is the first woman to hold the post. Green Warriors of Norway expressed approval of her appointment.

During Hambro's directorship, SFT imposed a fine of 5 million kr on Autoretur, which was in charge of handling car wrecks. Hambro cited the company's inadequate return system, and warned of another fine if this was not remedied. In an interview with Teknisk Ukeblad, Hambro admitted mistakes by the Pollution Authority before and after the Vest Tank explosion in Gulen Municipality, May 24, 2007. She said that the pollution authority ought to be better at investigating possible breaches of safety regulations, and that they could have offered better information to the Gulen community. She was also highly critical of the Vest Tank company, accusing them of lying and illegal waste management. Vest Tank responded by suing her for defamation. Hambro was sceptical of the merger between Statoil and the oil and gas division of Norsk Hydro, stating that the companies would no longer need to compete on being environmentally friendly. She was also critical of StatoilHydro's application to increase emissions at their LNG plant at Meløya in Hammerfest.

In 2013 her agency was merged to form the Norwegian Environment Agency. She continued as director general until 2025.

== Private life ==
Hambro is the daughter of philologist Carl Joachim Hambro and granddaughter of Conservative politician Carl Joachim Hambro, and is a member of the family that established Hambros Bank.

Civic offices
Preceded by Håvard Holm	Director of the Norwegian Climate and Pollution Agency; 2007–2013	Office abolished
New office	Director of the Norwegian Environment Agency; 2013–present	Incumbent
