= Skateboarding ban in Norway =

Prohibition of skateboards in Norway (1978–1989)

Statutory order on the ban of skateboards

Council of State of Norway
- Citation: FOR-1978-09-07-9022
- Territorial extent: Whole of Norway
- Enacted by: Council of State of Norway
- Enacted: 7 September 1978
- Effective: 15 September 1978
- Introduced by: Minister of the Environment Gro Harlem Brundtland
- Status: Repealed

Skateboarding and skateboards were illegal in Norway between 15 March 1978 and 8 May 1989. The prohibition included both the use of skateboards, the import, sale and distribution of skateboards or their components, and advertising for them. The ban was enacted as a statutory order and administered by the Ministry of the Environment and the Pollution Control Authority.

Despite its status as an illegal sport throughout the country, skateboarding remained as a marginal underground culture. People would acquire skateboards through building them themselves, buying them from illicit small-scale manufacturers, or through smuggling. Skateboarders, especially those who did street skateboarding, were prone to having their skateboards seized by the police, and possibly fined. Ramps were therefore built in remote forests, but even these were subject to police raids. A slight loosening of the rules took place from 1984, when organized skating was permitted.

Norway was the only country to have an all-out ban on skateboarding. The ban has been attributed to excessive risk management compounded through bureaucratic logic. It has also been seen as a moral panic by the establishment towards a perceived counterculture. The ban in Norway was unique not just in its totality, but that it was enacted through product control rather than property legislation.

== History ==
=== Background ===
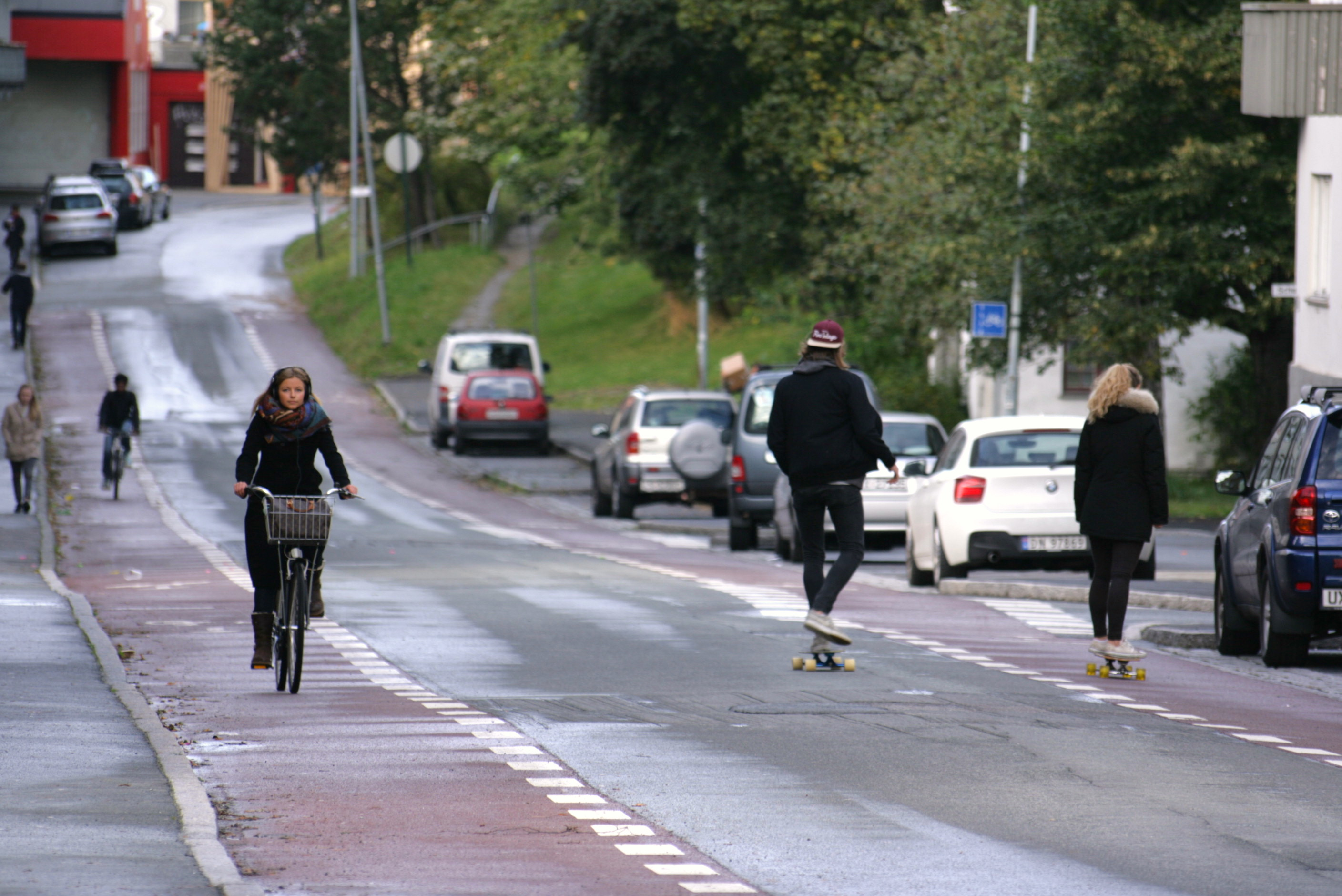
Two people skateboarding down Klæbuveien in Trondheim in 2015

The first time a mainstream newspaper in Norway covered skateboarding was when Dagbladet's US correspondent in 1965 wrote about youth skateboarding. It described how "this madness" had spread "like a pandemic from the beaches of California to the whole USA". It was further described as a hangover-sport preferably conducted in the early mornings after a party, riding slalom between empty beer bottles.

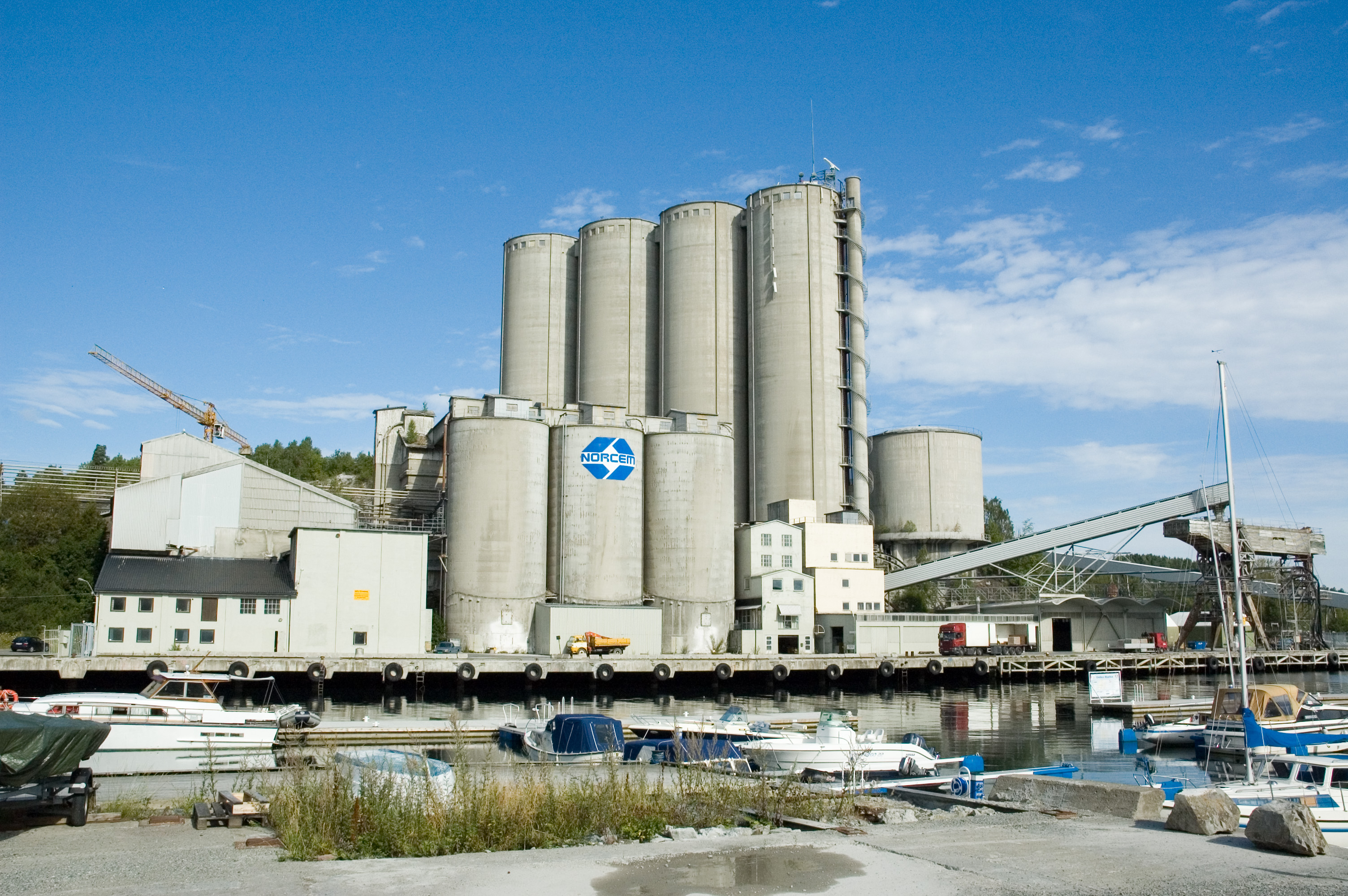
The Norcem plant at Slemmestad

Skateboards had made their way to Norway by 1976, although they initially remained of marginal interest. That year Arbeiderbladet carried a feature article about skateboarding by citing a sports store representative who had expertise with regard to its dangers. The following year, Aftenposten had a feature about youth from Oslo traveling to Slemmestad, where they skated in the inside of a industrial steel pipe with a 10-meter (33 ft) diameter at the Norcem plant. Later, Aftenposten followed a group of youth in Holmenkollen who skated down a trafficked road. The newspaper described the act as "excruciatingly lethal".

=== Introduction of the ban ===
The decisive issue for the ban was media reports about massive number of injuries amongst skaters, and pedestrians they collided with, in the United States. On 8 December 1976, the Directorate of Public Roads transmitted a missive to the Ministry of the Environment, inquiring as to whether a newly passed Product Control Act could be used to ban skateboards. The ministry passed the request on to the newly created Product Control Council.

Work on the Product Control Act had begun in 1973, initially as a means of protecting the environment from harmful products, particularly synthetic substances. Trade unions suggested that the act also include provisions on products that could harm workers. The Consumer Council wanted to use the act to protect consumers from dangerous products, and these provisions made their way into the act. It was passed by Parliament on 11 June 1976 and came into force on 1 September 1977. The act included a number of provisions for approval or banning of products based on their harm to the environment, workers or the public.

The act established the Product Control Council, with twelve members from various government agencies and non-governmental organizations. The Norwegian Pollution Control Authority (SFT) acted both as its secretariat and for administrating any restrictions. The authority had been selected because of the act's initial emphasis on the environment; its employees were unfamiliar with the dangerous product dimension. For the same reason, the act also fell under the auspices of the Ministry of the Environment.

The ban on skateboarding and skateboards was the council's inaugural recommendation. The SFT had during the consultations proposed that the issue was more appropriately handled by the Police Service or the Public Roads Administration. However, a large majority on the council were in favor of a ban. A notion at the time was that a total ban would be both the easiest way to handle the regulation, and pose the least burden to the government. The Pollution Control Authority passed the proposal on to the ministry without further comments, in part because the fledgling agency did not want to go against the council in its inaugural case.

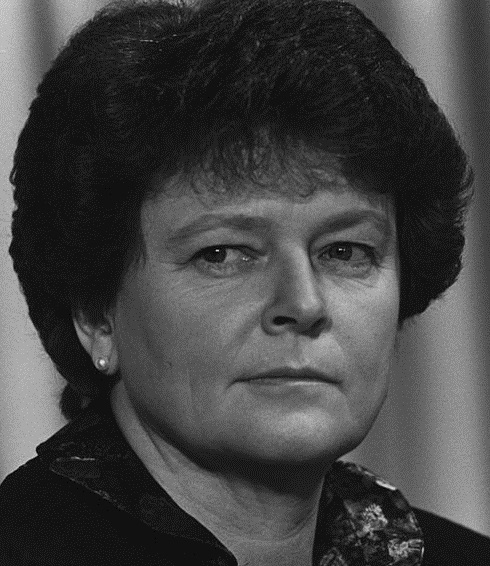
Gro Harlem Brundtland (Labor) in 1989. As Minister of the Environment she was responsible for introducing the ban, and as Prime Minister she was responsible for repealing it

The Ministry of the Environment introduced a temporary product ban on skateboards on 15 March 1978. This fell under the responsibility of Minister of the Environment, Gro Harlem Brundtland from the Labor Party. The temporary ban was replaced by a permanent ban approved as a statutory order passed in Council of State by Nordli's Cabinet on 7 September 1978, taking effect on 15 September. The ban was made widely known through announcements in all newspapers on 8 October.

Few public people were opposed to the ban. A notable exception was comedian Rolv Wesenlund, who was a vocal opponent of the ban. He let himself be photographed by the press skateboarding in front of the Royal Palace, and said he would pay both fines and for legal aid if his skateboarding son was apprehended by the police. This caused a public debate, with one letter to the editor asking if he would also pay the hospital bill if his son was injured.

=== Underground skating ===
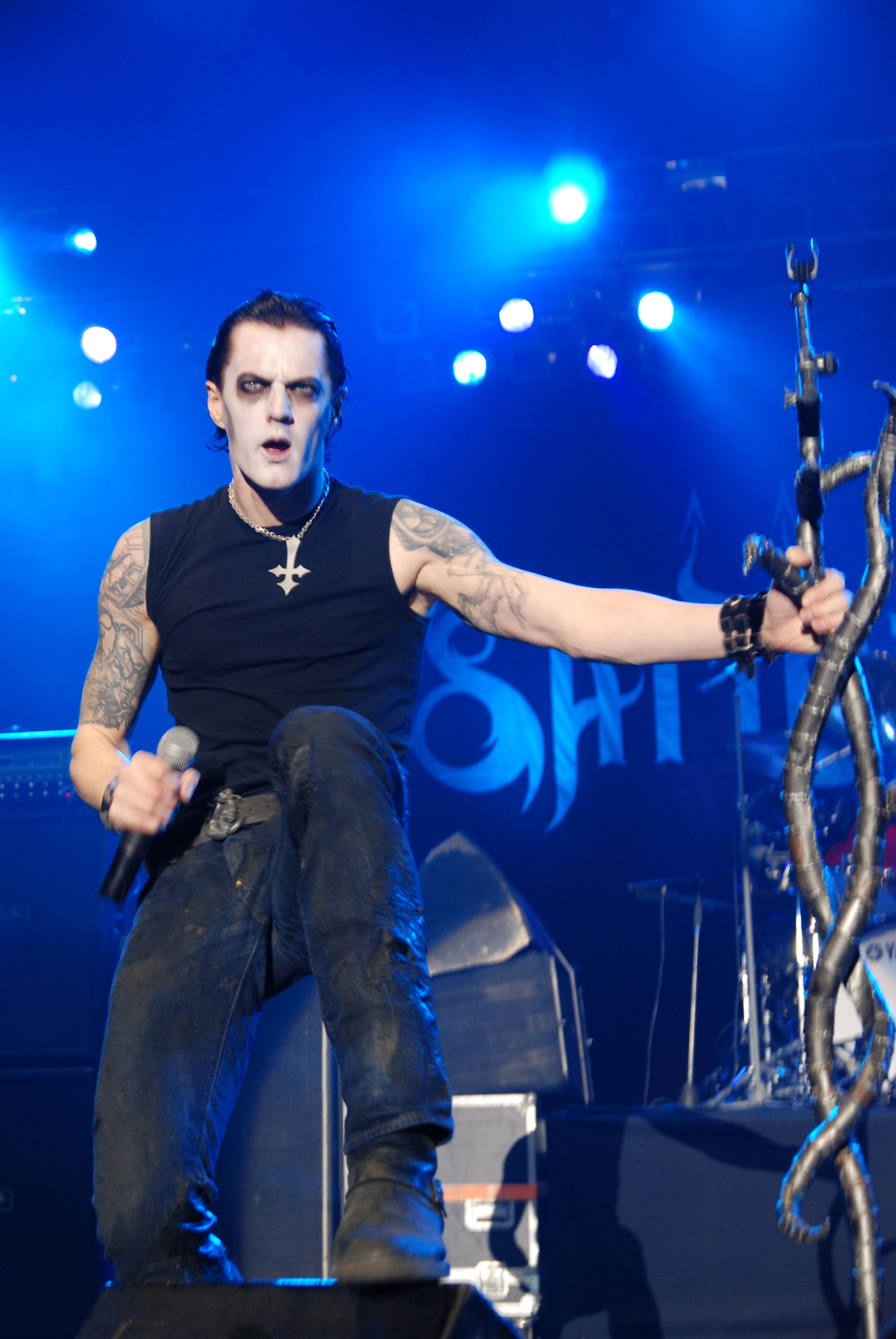
Sigurd "Satyr" Wongraven, vocalist in Satyricon, was an avid skateboarder during the prohibition.

The ban did not stop people from acquiring skateboards and skateboarding. As there were no legal means of buying the boards domestically, skateboarders had to get creative. One approach was to build them oneself. Some people in the subculture would also build boards on commission. The most notorious of these was Anders Witussen, who had started home manufacturing of skateboards just before the ban. He continued to manufacture throughout the prohibition period, manufacturing about 200 boards under the brands Mad Rabbit and Utopia.

There were no restrictions on the sale of skateboards in any surrounding country, such as Sweden and Denmark. Norwegians were free to buy skateboards and parts in these countries, but the problem was bringing them into Norway. If found on the border, the Norwegian Customs Service would seize any skateboards they came across. Skateboarders would therefore find creative ways to smuggle them into Norway. Examples of these were placing them inside the structure of a camper, and walking over a mountain to cross the Norway–Sweden border.

If police patrols came across skateboarding or skateboards, they would normally seize the board, and occasionally issue fines. For the skaters, the loss of the board was not just a material cost. The difficulties of procuring boards meant that they could be out of their hobby for a long time. They would therefore go to great lengths to avoid the police, trying to hide their skateboards or running away if caught.

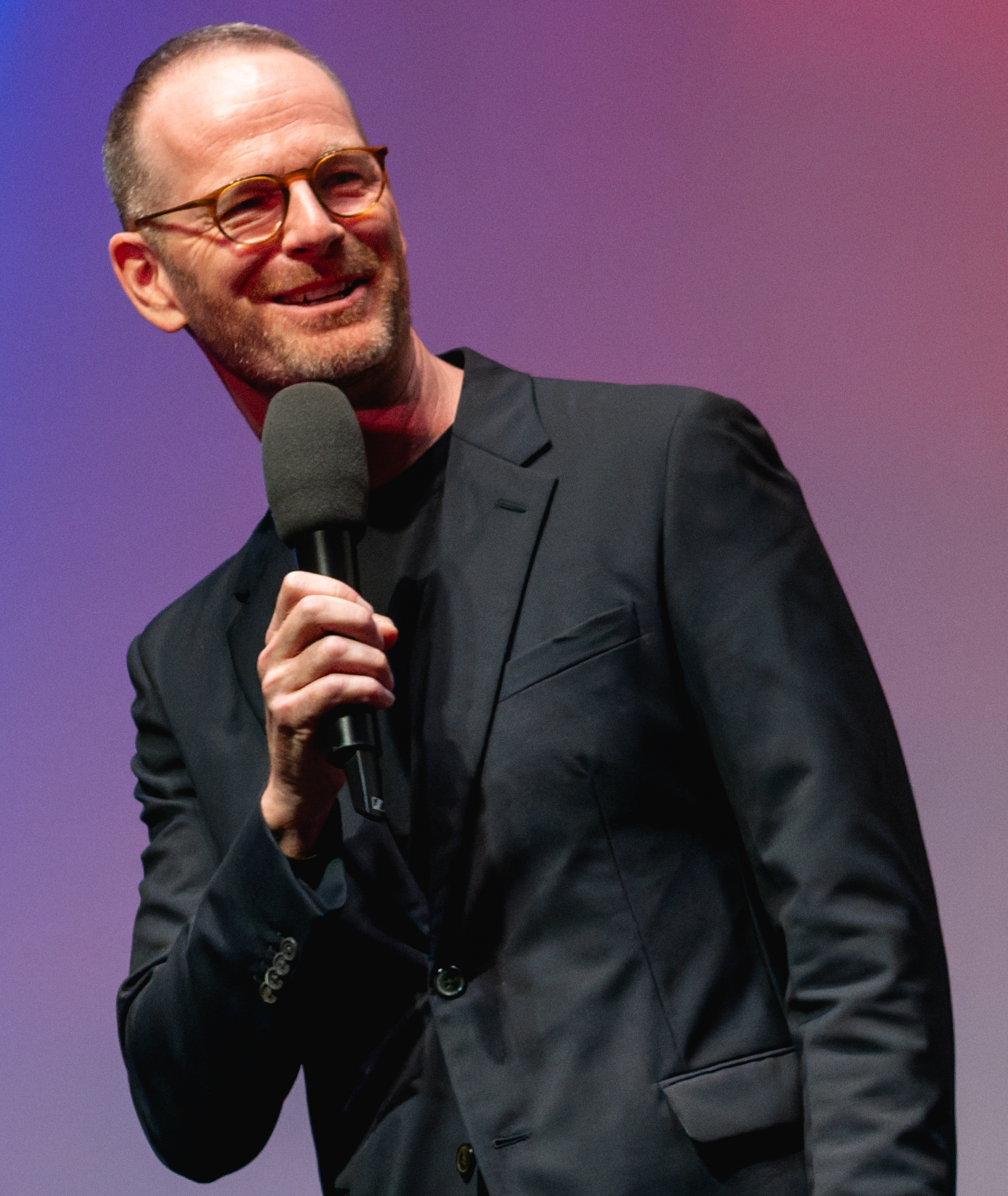
Filmmaker Joachim Trier was active in the illegal skateboarding scene; his two first films featured him and his friends skateboarding

Skateboarding was prominent in youth mass media throughout the 1980s, and in particular American media made skateboarding known amongst youth in Norway. Particularly influential was the skating scene from the 1985 film Back to the Future, which single-handedly recruited many skaters.

Sigurd "Satyr" Wongraven, vocalist in Satyricon, Bigbang frontman Øystein Greni, and film director Joachim Trier were both avid and prominent skaters during the prohibition. In his teenage years, Trier composed short films of him and his buddies skateboarding, and would later become Norwegian skateboarding champion. Greni would go on to become European champion.

In general, those who did ramp skateboarding had it easier with law enforcement than those who did street skateboarding, who were at a higher risk of encountering random police patrols. Ramps would be built in the forest in remote locations, often more than a kilometer from the closest path. Still, the police would conduct raids towards these ramps in the hopes of confiscating skateboards. This forced the skaters further and further into the woods. The police would from time to time be depicted in newspapers showing off contraband skateboards they had confiscated from people as young as twelve years old.

=== Organized skateboarding ===
After lobbying from some of the skateboarders, the Pollution Control Authority started allowing dispensations from the ban. The condition was that the involved people were members of formal skateboarding clubs, and that they solely used the skateboard at approved skateparks. The easing of the law allowed people with proper membership to import skateboards for their own use, and select stores were allowed to sell skateboards to such club members.

The first legal skatepark was situated in the Frogner Park in Oslo. To use the ramp legally, one had to be a member of the Oslo Skateboard Society. Four more clubs in other cities received dispensations in 1985. Dispensations became gradually easier to acquire, and there were exhibitions with skateboarding, bringing it further into public attention.

=== Lifting of ban ===
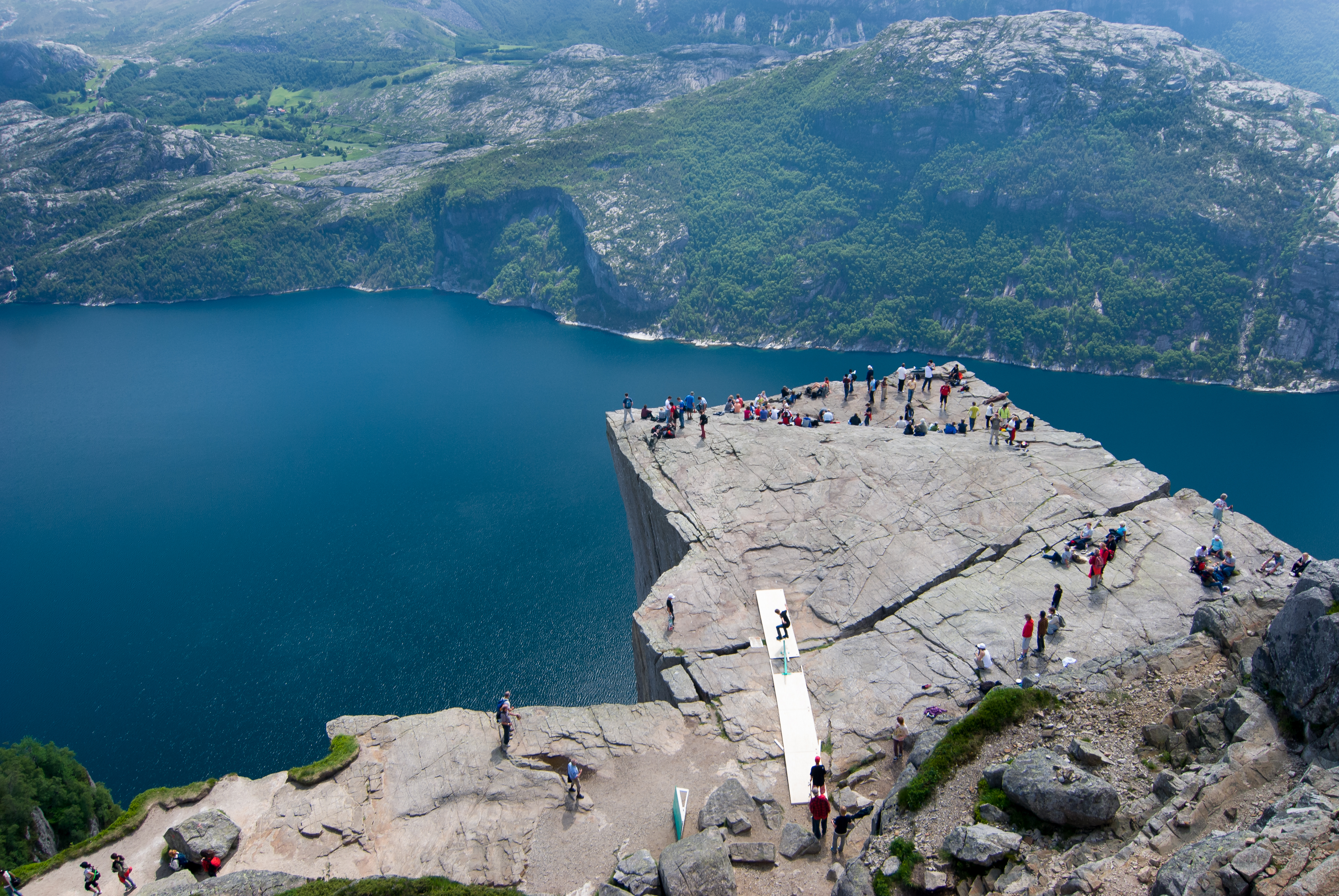
Skateboarding at Preikestolen in 2007, an activity which would have been an offence twenty years earlier

Throughout the 1980s, public familiarity with skateboarding increased. This was both through the influence of popular culture from aboard, as well as the onset of legal club skateboarding. In addition, there was a general trend of deregulation. Combined, they made the ban increasingly politically untenable.

The Conservative Party secured power in 1981. Even though they were eager to deregulate, they never touched the skateboarding ban.

The decision to lift the ban was made on 3 May 1989 and took effect on 9 May. Gro Harlem Brundtland, now prime minister, posed on a skateboard leading up to the 1989 parliamentary elections. She stated that the ban had been the right choice at the time, but that she was now glad to see young people enjoy skateboarding legally.

Just weeks after the ban was lifted, the issue was raised in the parliamentary debate by Marit Rotnes (Labor). She stated that there was a rise in accidents both amongst skateboarders and amongst elderly pedestrians who had collided with skaters, and asked if the ministry was considering re-introducing a ban. Nothing more came of the issue.

== Legal ==
Between 15 September 1978 and 8 May 1989, a statutory order forbade the import and sale of skateboards and their components, advertisements for skateboards and their components, and all use of skateboards. Dispensation could only be given in to a limited degree and for particular uses.

The statutory order was based on the Product Control Act of 11 June 1976, which had provisions to make it easy to ban lethal toys. The statutory order was passed by Council of State rather than by Parliament. The order fell under the auspice of the Ministry of the Environment.

The implementation of the regulations lay with Norwegian Pollution Control Authority, and it was the agency which processed dispensations. These could be appealed to the Ministry of the Environment. Breaches of the order could result in the compounding of the skateboards, or fines.

The ban was in a global perspective unusual not just because of its totality. In other countries, skateboarding was commonly banned in various locations during the period. However, these were typically implemented through property legislation. Norway utilizing product control legislation to regulate skateboarding was unique.

== Cause ==
Skateboarding was broadly disliked by the establishment during the period, and anti-skateboarding legislation was commonplace in many countries. These were, however, either local in scope or tied to particular locations or situations. Norway was the only country in the world to have an all-out ban on skateboarding.

The stated reason by the authorities for implementing the ban was the high accident rates being reported from abroad. Tommy Langseth and Niels Asle Bergsgard argue that this rationale may in itself have been a contributing factor, but it does not explain why it was necessary to implement such a broad all-out ban, especially when many similarly or even more dangerous activities were permitted. It would have been fully possible to implement a more narrow ban, while still allowing skateboarding in general.

Many other sports and activities which entail a high risk are and were permitted in Norway, such as base jumping and whitewater paddling. On the other hand, Norway has taken a cautionary stance as well in full contact sports. For instance, Norway for many years also had a ban on boxing and as of 2024 still has a ban on mixed martial arts.

The then-director of the Pollution Control Authority, Rolf Bjørnstad, stated retrospectively that for them an all-out ban was seen as simpler for the government than a more flexible regulatory approach, and that it was easier for the bureaucracy to deal with an all-out ban.

The government had during the late 1970s become increasingly concerned with protecting children from hazardous products. A 1977 white paper bringing this issue to the forefront was part of the ministry's formal rationale for the ban. These and other statements emphasized skateboards as toys and the users as children, for instance through claims that injuries occur while "playing with skateboards". Even towards the end of the ban, representatives from the police would refer to skateboards as toys. Skateboarding was therefore not perceived by policymakers as a sport, a designation which would have made it much more difficult to justify the ban.

Underground skater Torgny Amdam stated retrospectively that in Norway at the time there was very limited perception of what constituted a sport—in effect it was restricted to football, hockey and skiing. Langseth and Bergsgard argue that in Norwegian culture, sport is associated with endurance and strength, and that in such a light, it would be difficult for a bureaucracy to perceive the more playful activity of skateboarding as a sport.

The late 1970s and early 1980s represents a transition period between social democratic order and neoliberal values such as deregulation and liberalization. By the time the ban was introduced in 1978, this trend had already started. Yet, the government chose a restrictive line and implemented a regulation on a novel product.

The skateboarding ban has also been seen as a means to suppress an unwanted subculture. R. Gazares argues that skateboarding both has inherent neoliberal traits, while at the same time challenging neoliberal values. Becky Beal argues that skateboarding "resists capitalist social relations".

The ban has been understood as a moral panic, especially from within the skateboarding community. These are characterized by an excessive public fear, in skateboarding's case through the consistently negative press coverage and emphasis on bodily harm that it could cause.

== Legacy ==
The aftermath of the lifting of the ban saw an explosion in skateboarding in Norway. A national association for skateboarders was formed, and a national championship was organized the same year. Skateboarding became incredibly popular for a short period after the ban was lifted. Once the hype settled, popularity declined again.

After it was lifted, the ban has been subject to ridicule, and has often been used as an example of unnecessary government intervention in the lives of the public.

Emil Trier produced the documentary Brettkontroll in 2006, which documented the illegal skateboarding during the prohibition. Instead of portraying the skaters as victims, it emphasized the ingenuity of youth and their determination to skate. The film was shown at numerous film festivals.

The Olympic Channel launched the documentary Foul Play: Norway's Skate Ban in 2020, in conjunction with that skateboarding was being introduced as an Olympic sport at the 2020 Summer Olympics.

== See also ==
- Skateboarding is not a crime
