= Håvard Holm =

Norwegian civil servant

Håvard Endre Holm (15 December 1943 – 28 July 2017) was a Norwegian civil servant.

He is a cand.jur. by education. He was hired in the Ministry of the Environment in 1972, and was promoted to deputy under-secretary of state in 1989. From 1996 to 31 December 2006 he served as director of the Norwegian Pollution Control Authority, the first year as acting director. He thereafter worked as an advisor with the same agency.

Civic offices
Preceded by Harald Rensvik	Director of the Norwegian Pollution Control Authority; 1996–2006	Succeeded by Ellen Hambro
