= Samson Isberg =

Norwegian executioner

- Born: 26 April 1795; Kinsarvik
- Died: 25 May 1873; Bergen
- Occupation: Executioner

Samson Isberg (26 April 1795 – 25 May 1873) was a Norwegian executioner. He served as Norway's official executioner from 1849 to 1868. Among his jobs were the beheading of Aslak Hætta and Mons Somby in 1854, and the last public execution in Christiania, at Etterstad in 1864. Isberg's axe is exhibited at the Oslo Police Museum.

== Personal life ==
Isberg was born in Kinsarvik, the son of farmer Samson Samsonsen Stana and Anna Sveinsdatter Skjedås. He was married to Anna Henriche Hansen, and settled in Bergen. He died in Bergen in 1873.

== Career ==
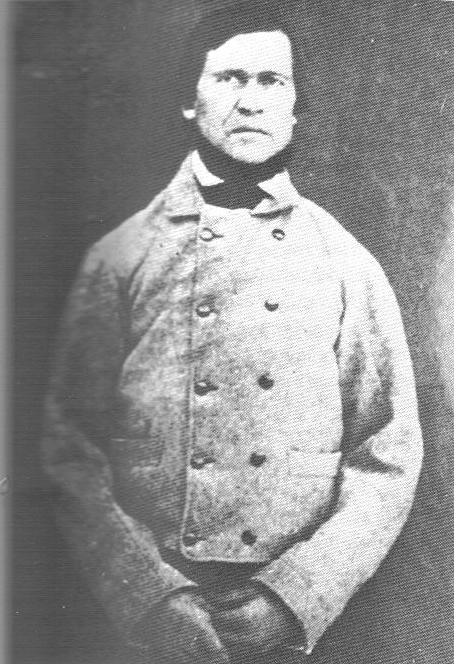
Elias Dahlgren, who was executed in 1861

Isberg worked as a caretaker at Bergen tukthus (prison). He was assigned executioner for the city of Bergen in 1836, and in 1838 he was given the same job for all of Nordre Bergenhus amt, Søndre Bergenhus amt, and Stavanger amt. His first commission was in 1841, the execution of Johannes Mikkelsen Eggum from Sogndal, who had killed his wife and son with arsenic. In 1845, he beheaded Ingeborg Olsdatter Grønlien, who had killed her father with an axe. Isberg's third task was the execution of Peder Olsen Ringeneie in 1847. Ringeneie was convicted for the murder of his wife Anne, while his lover Birgit received a life sentence. Gjest Baardsen wrote a song about the incidents leading to the murder and later execution. In 1849, Isberg was appointed the position of "Rigets skarpretter" (Executioner of the kingdom) by the government, thus being the only executioner in Norway. His next commission was the execution of Jens Larsen Halden, who was convicted for robbery and murder. Editor Christian Monsen reported on the execution in his newspaper Trondhjems Stiftstidende, where he particularly focused on the behavior of the audience. The Kautokeino uprising in 1852 resulted in execution of two of the leaders, Mons Somby and Aslak Hætta. The execution took place in Alta on 15 November 1854. Isberg had made the long journey from Bergen to Alta, and about one thousand spectators watched his beheading of the two. Christian Guldbrandsen Harebakken was executed in Ringsaker Municipality in 1857, convicted for murder and robbery. According to the newspaper Morgenbladet an audience of several thousand persons witnessed the execution. Jakob Johannessen Kvashiller and Even Gloppestuen were beheaded in 1858 and 1860 respectively, both found guilty of murdering their wives. Isberg's tenth execution was Elias Dahlgren, convicted for robbery which led to the death of one of the victims. Dahlgren was executed in Halden in 1861. In 1862, Isberg had two assignments, first Ole Anton Sivertsen Moland in Kabelvåg, who had killed his wife, and then Peder Pedersen Marken, who had killed his mother, and was executed at Ellevoldsmoen in Rendalen Municipality. In 1863, Isberg was responsible for the beheading of Ole Hansen Stokkestadeie in Vaage Municipality, who was convicted for the murder of two persons. Isberg's last commission was the beheading of Friedrich Wilhelm Priess and Knud Christian Frederik Simonsen, who had murdered a farmer in Christiania. The execution took place at Etterstad on 19 April 1864. This was the last public execution in Christiania, attended by an audience of about 5,000.
