= Aall =

Aall is a Norwegian surname. Notable people with the surname include:

- Anathon Aall (1867–1943), Norwegian academic
- Hans Aall (1869–1946), Norwegian museum director
- Hans J. C. Aall (1806–1894), Norwegian politician
- Jacob Aall (1773–1844), Norwegian historian and statesman
- Jørgen Aall (1771–1833), Norwegian ship-owner and politician
- Nicolai Benjamin Aall (1739–1798), Norwegian ship-owner and businessman
- Niels Aall (1769–1854), Norwegian estate owner, businessman and politician
- Nils Aall Barricelli (1912–1993), Norwegian-Italian mathematician
- Jacob Bjerknes (1897–1975), Norwegian meteorologist, born Jacob Aall Bonnevie Bjerknes
- Jacob Aall Bonnevie (1838–1904), Norwegian educator and politician
- Jørgen Aall Flood (1820–1892), Norwegian politician
- Jakob Larsen (1888–1974), American classical scholar, born Jacob Aall Ottesen Larsen
- J. A. O. Preus (1883–1961), American politician, born Jacob Aall Ottesen Preus
- J. A. O. Preus II (1920–1994), American religious leader, born Jacob Aall Ottesen Preus II

== See also ==
- Aall (Norwegian family)
- AALL (disambiguation)
