= Rosa Asmundsen =

Norwegian actress and singer (1846–1911)

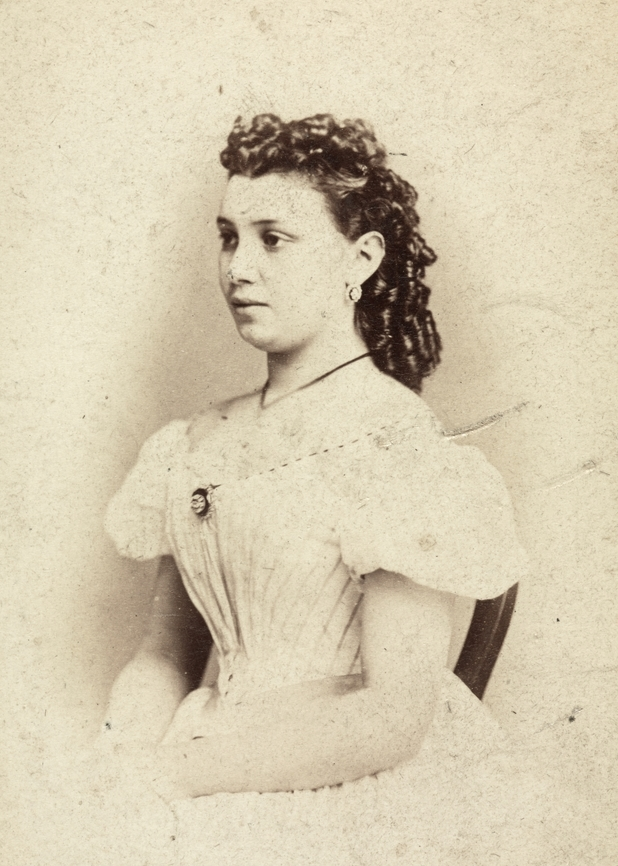
- Rosa Asmundsen in 1868
- Born: Rosa Anna Charlotte Baldani; 29 December 1846; Christiania, Norway
- Died: 11 January 1911 (aged 64); Bergen, Norway
- Spouse: Jacob Hveding Asmundsen (m. 1868; died 1910)

Rosa Anna Charlotte Asmundsen (née Baldani; 29 December 1846 – 15 January 1911) was a Norwegian actress and singer who was employed at the Den Nationale Scene from its opening in 1876, where she was known for playing soubrette roles. She became the theatre's first retiree in 1903.

== Early life ==
Rosa Anna Charlotte Asmundsen was born on 29 December 1846 in Christiania (now Oslo) to Italian plaster manufacturer Giovanni Baldani and Anna Eriksdatter. She married the actor Jacob Hveding Asmundsen (1841–1910) and together they were the parents of actor Sigurd Asmundsen (1871–1934).

== Career ==
She excelled as a child actress and had several roles at the Christiania Theatre, including the boy roles of Egil in The Vikings at Helgeland (1858–1859) and the title role in Ole Lukøje (1860).

She made her adult debut at the Christiania Theatre in the spring of 1865, as Thora in Et Enfoldigt Pigebarn. From 1865 to 1867, she performed at the Folketeatret in Christiania and participated in the theatre's tour to Sweden, with performances in Gothenburg and Stockholm in August 1866. From 1867 to 1868, she performed with Theodor Cortes' travelling company.

At a performance of Christian Monsen's play Gudbrandsdølerne in Bergen in 1869, it was said that Asmundsen portrayed the role of Gudrun "with a grace and sincerity that one is not so often accustomed to seeing on our stage. The truth and naturalness with which she performed her part made one forget that it was a play that was only seen and heard by Gudrun herself".

She continued touring with her husband as part of F. A. Cetti's company in 1871–1872, with performances in Trondheim, Bergen, and Tinn. Then, from 1872 to 1874, they were with E. J. Hafgren at Møllergatens theatre and at Christiania Theatre from 1874 to 1876. It was there she distinguished herself through several singing roles, such as Zerlina in Don Giovanni and as Cherubino in The Marriage of Figaro.

Asmundsen was employed by the Den Nationale Scene in Bergen from its opening in 1876 until summer 1903. There she would often play the role of soubrette, the beautiful, mischievous and merry chambermaid. In 1903, she retired because she no longer had the physical capacity required to perform. She was financially supported by the theatre, becoming its first retiree.

== Death ==
Asmundsen died on 15 January 1911 in Bergen, at the age of 64.
