= Bergo =

Bergo or Bergö is a surname. Notable people with this surname include:

== Bergo ==
- Arthur Bergo (born 1994), Brazilian rugby player
- Bettina Bergo, Canadian philosopher
- Magnar Lund Bergo (born 1949), Norwegian politician
- Olav Terje Bergo (born 1946), Norwegian newspaper editor

== Bergö ==
- Aino Bergö (1915–1944), Swedish ballerina, opera singer and film actress

== See also ==
- Bergö, an island and former municipality of Finland, in the Coastal Ostrobothnia region
- Bergön, an island in the northwest of the Swedish sector of the Bay of Bothnia, in the Kalix archipelago
