= Harald Rensvik =

Norwegian civil servant (1946–2026)

Harald Rensvik (4 March 1946 – 2 September 2026) was a Norwegian civil servant.

== Life and career ==
Rensvik was born in Arendal, and grew up in Ålesund Municipality and Valdres. He graduated as a siv.ing from the Norwegian Institute of Technology.

He worked as a head of department in the Norwegian Pollution Control Authority from 1982 to 1986. In 1987 he took over as director of the Pollution Control Authority. He served until 1996, except for the period between 1990 and 1992, when he was a state secretary for the Minister of Government Administration and Labour in the third cabinet Brundtland. From 1996 he was permanent under-secretary of State in the Ministry of the Environment, being granted a leave of absence from 1999 to 2001. He was also a member of the board of the European Environment Agency.

Rensvik died on 2 September 2026, at the age of 80.

Government offices
| Preceded by Christian Hambro | Director of the Norwegian Pollution Control Authority; 1987–1990 | Succeeded by Gunnar Jordfald (acting) |
| Preceded by Gunnar Jordfald (acting) | Director of the Norwegian Pollution Control Authority; 1992–1996 | Succeeded by Håvard Holm |
