= Norwegian Environment Agency =

- Miljødirektoratet
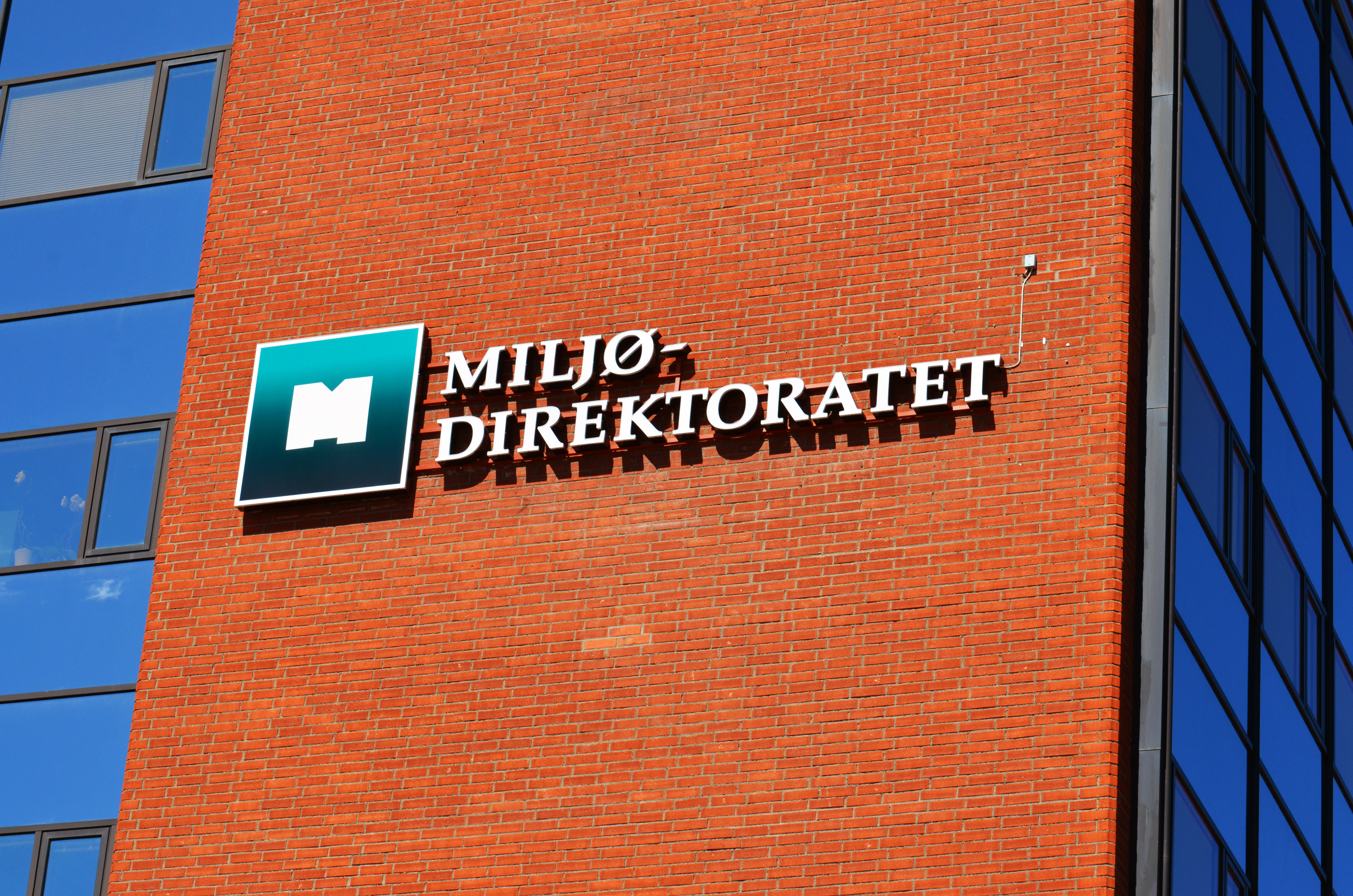

Government agency overview
- Formed: July 1, 2013; 13 years ago
- Jurisdiction: Government of Norway
- Headquarters: Brattørkaia 15, Trondheim, Norway
- Employees: 700 (2024)
- Annual budget: 4.8 billion kroner (2018)
- Government agency executive: Hilde Singsaas, Director general
- Parent Government agency: Norwegian Ministry of Climate and Environment
- Website: environmentagency.no

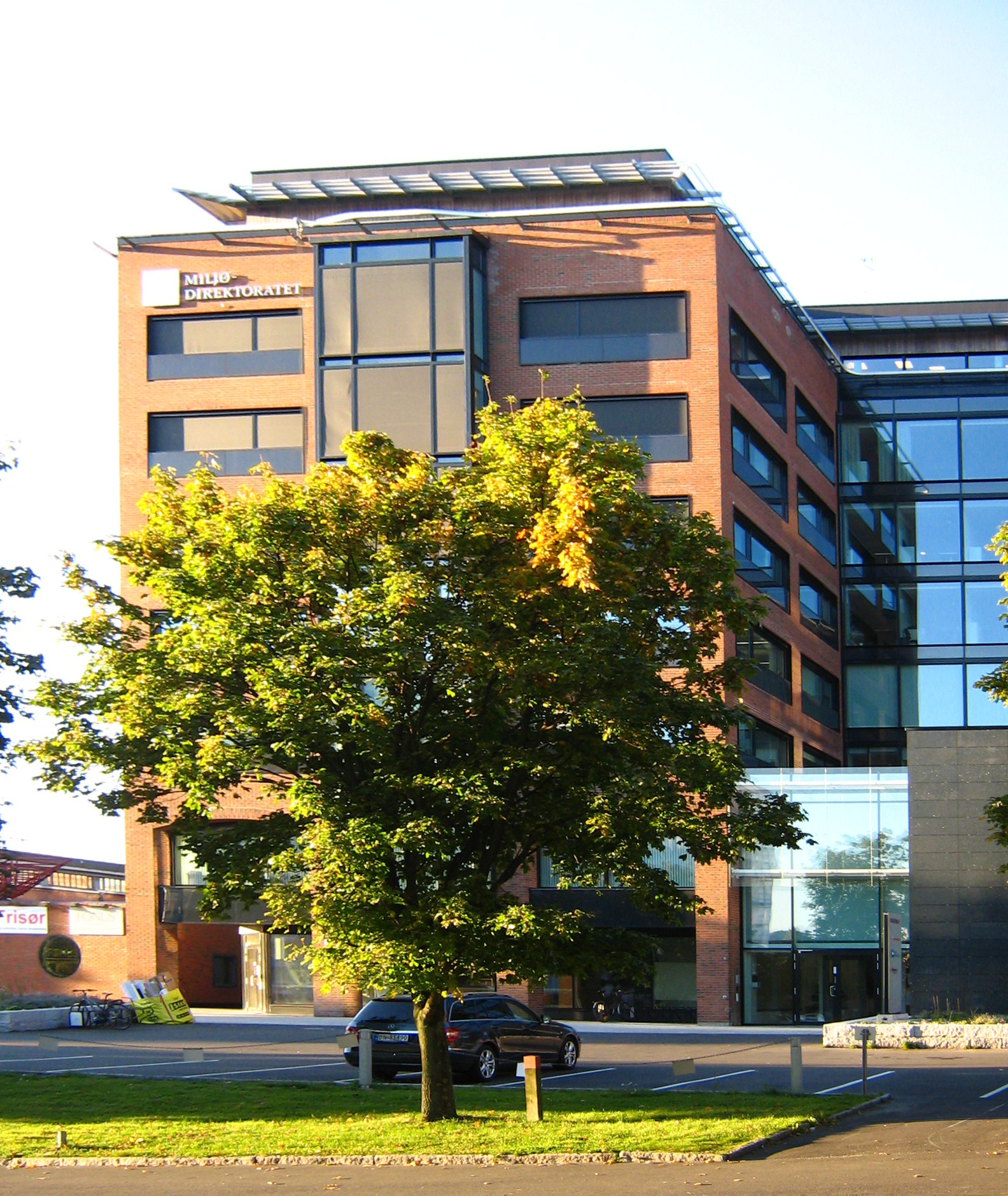
The agency's Oslo offices.

The Norwegian Environment Agency (Norwegian: Miljødirektoratet) is a Norwegian government agency under the Ministry of Climate and Environment. Its primary responsibilities are to reduce greenhouse gas emissions, manage Norwegian nature, and prevent pollution. The agency has offices in Trondheim and Oslo, in addition to multiple Norwegian Nature Inspectorate local offices nationwide.

== History ==
The agency was created on 1 July 2013 through a merger of the Norwegian Directorate for Nature Management and the Norwegian Climate and Pollution Agency.

== Directors general ==
The agency's Director general is appointed by the sitting government for a six year term, which may be extended once.

Ellen Hambro was the agency's first Director general, serving from its creation in 2013 until 2025. Hilde Singsaas, previously Director general of The Norwegian Agency for Public and Financial Management, replaced Hambro on March 1st, 2025.
