= AALL =

The abbreviation AALL may refer to:

- The American Association for Labor Legislation, an early advocacy group for national health insurance in the US
- The American Association of Law Libraries
- The Austrian Association for Legal Linguistics, a scientific organisation investigating the relationship between language and law

== See also ==
- Aall, a Norwegian surname
- Aall (Norwegian family)
