= Gunnar Jordfald =

Norwegian civil servant

Gunnar Jordfald (born 4 May 1946) is a Norwegian civil servant.

He graduated as a siv.ing from the Norwegian Institute of Technology. He was acting director of the Norwegian Pollution Control Authority from 1990 to 1992, director of the now-defunct Norwegian Food Control Authority from 1998 to 2003 and director of the Norwegian Institute for Air Research since 2003. He has also worked for Norges Teknisk-Naturvitenskapelige Forskningsråd and the United Nations Environment Programme.

Government offices
Preceded by Harald Rensvik	Director of the Norwegian Pollution Control Authority (acting); 1990–1992	Succeeded by Harald Rensvik
Preceded by	Director of Norwegian Food Control Authority; 1998–2003	Succeeded by position abolished
