= Christian Monsen =

Norwegian writer and politician (1815–1852)

Christian Martin Monsen
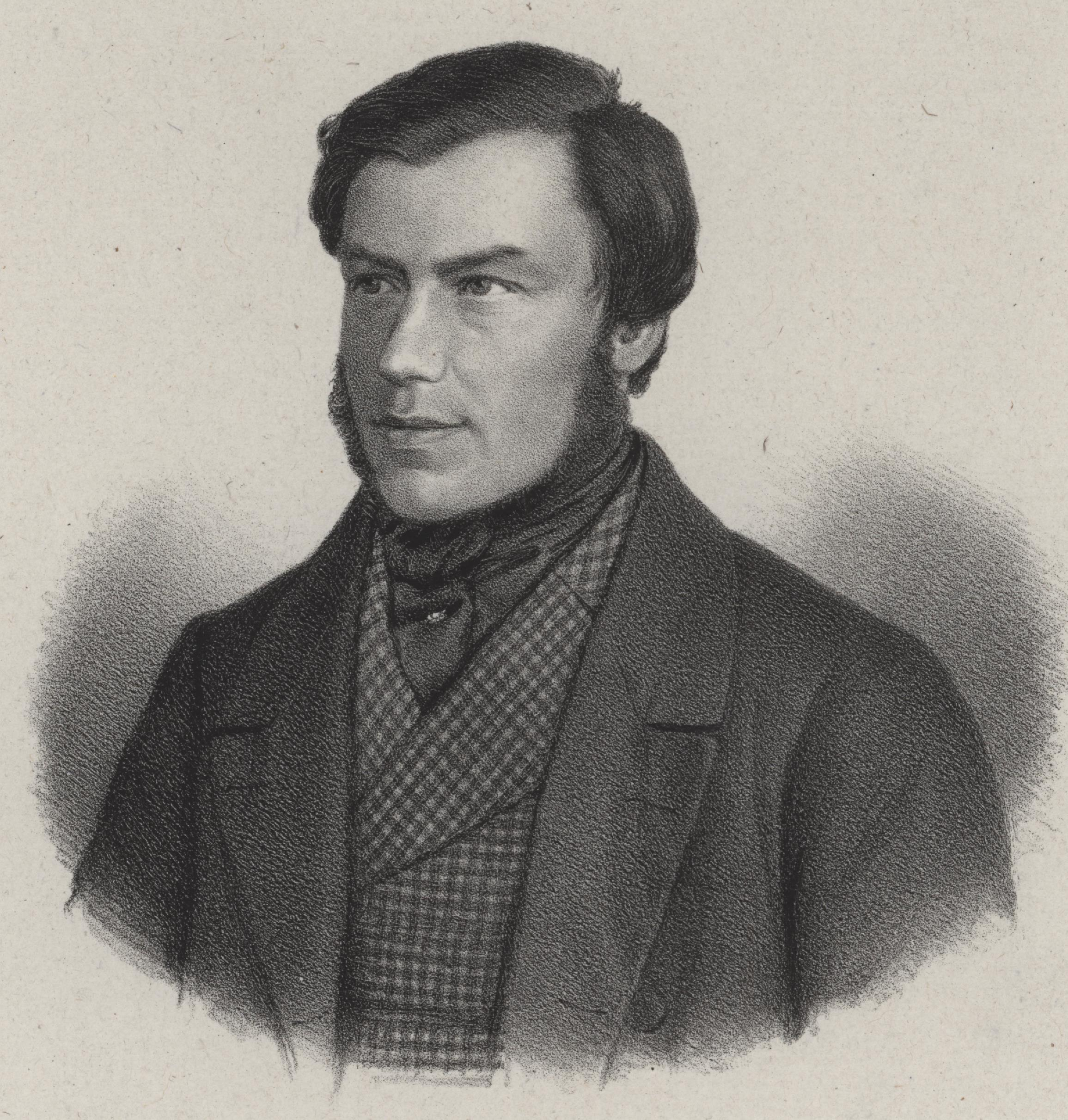
- Born: 18 June 1815; Larvik, Norway
- Died: 25 May 1852 (aged 36); Trondheim
- Education: Pharmacist
- Occupations: Journalist, newspaper editor, novelist and poet

Christian Martin Monsen (18 June 1815 – 25 May 1852) was a Norwegian novelist, poet, journalist, newspaper editor and politician.

== Early and personal life ==
Monsen was born in Larvik, a son of Johan Christian Monsen and Anne Johanne Sørensen. He was educated as pharmacist, but had a career as writer. He married Frederikke Herholdt in 1845.

== Career ==
Monsen edited Drammens Adresse in 1842, the Trondheim newspaper Nordlyset 1845–1846 and Throndhjems Stiftstidende 1849–1851. His publications include the story John Colbanusen. En Hædersdaadsminde from 1840, the poetry collection Alpeblomster from 1846, Foraarsgave for Damer from 1849, and the novel Dronning Gyda from 1850. His novel De Forsonede was published after his death (1856), and the play Gudbrandsdølerne in 1857.

He was a co-founder and first chairman of Trondhjems Arbeiderforening in 1850, as part of the so-called Thrane movement. He died in 1852, aged 36.
