= Tanja Heiberg Storm =

Norwegian diplomat (1946–2023)

- Born: 27 April 1946
- Died: 9 March 2023 (aged 76)
- Education: cand.mag.
- Occupation: Diplomat
- Employer: Ministry of Foreign Affairs
- Awards: Order of St. Olav (2002)

Tanja Heiberg Storm (27 April 1946 – 9 March 2023) was a Norwegian diplomat, an ambassador to the Organisation for Economic Co-operation and Development.

== Biography ==
Born on 27 April 1946, Storm was assigned to the Ministry of Foreign Affairs since 1974. She was ambassador to the OECD in Paris from 2001 to 2006, and from 2006 to 2014 she worked as special advisor in the Ministry of Foreign Affairs.

She was decorated Commander of the Order of St. Olav in 2002.

Storm died on 9 March 2023.
