= Etterstad =

Neighborhood in Oslo, Norway

Coordinates: 59°54′36″N 10°48′02″E

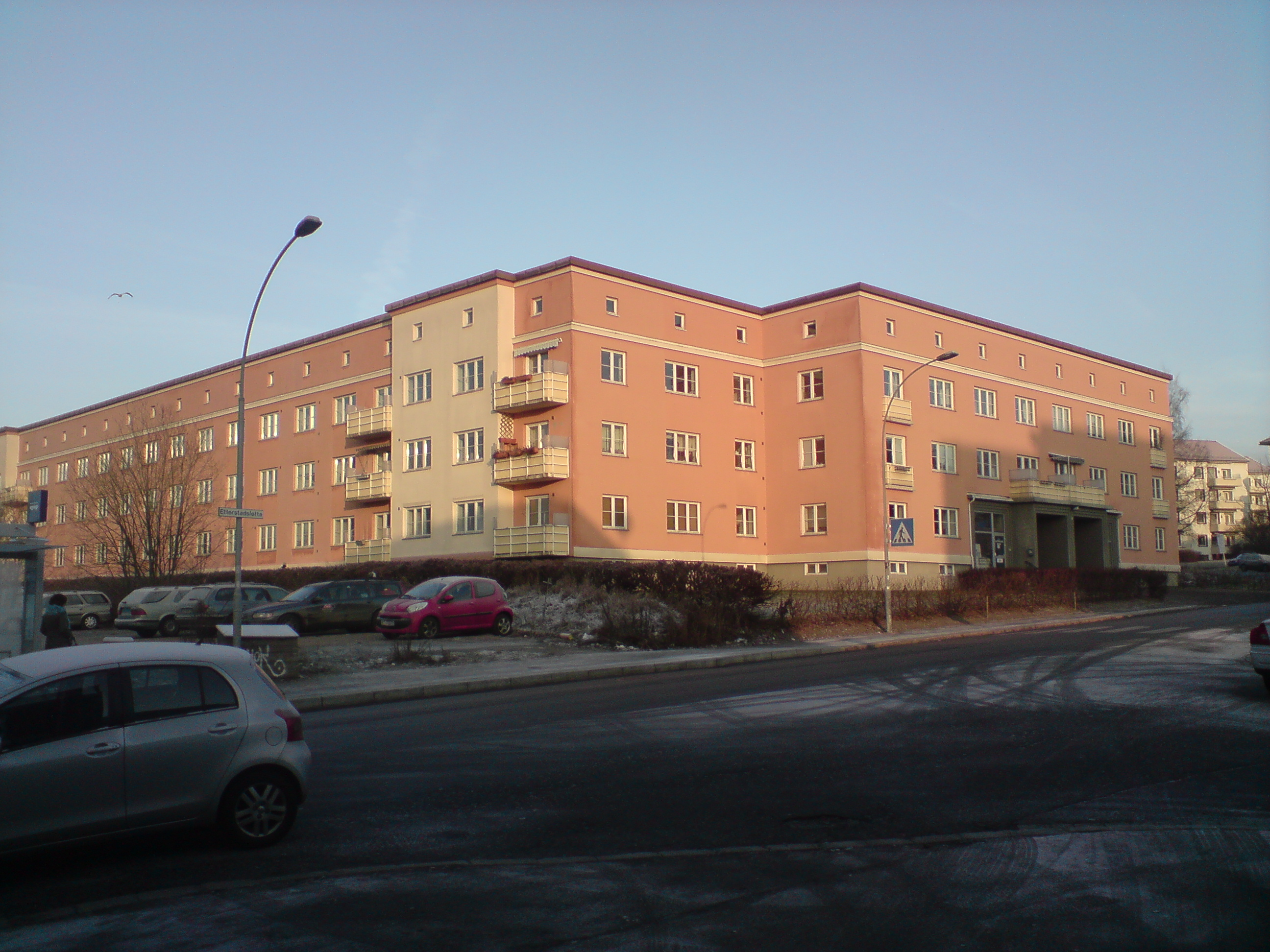
Etterstadslottet

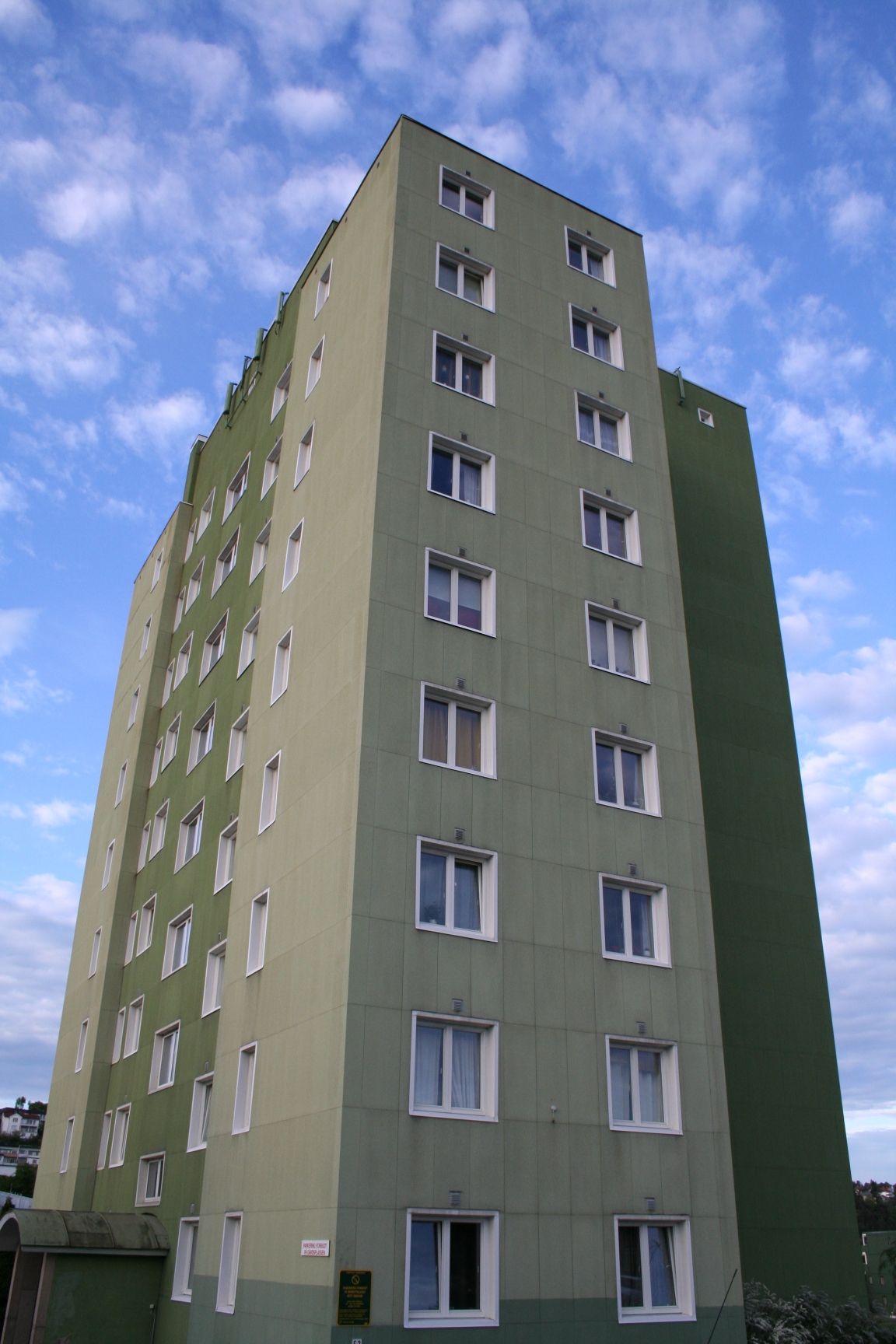
One of the four apartment blocks

Etterstad is a neighborhood in Oslo, located between the river Alna and Strømsveien, north of Vålerenga. It was incorporated into Oslo in 1946, two years before the merger of Oslo and Aker. The area is mainly residential.

== History ==
The area takes its name from Etterstad Farm, that was located close to the present Helsfyr area, about where the current Helsfyr T-bane station is located. The farm name is Old Norse and is a contraction of Eitill (a person's name) and stad (meaning "place"). Records of the farm are recorded back to 1396 as an estate of the bishop.

It remained church property until 1795 when it was taken over by the city and made a military training field, in exchange for a rent paid by the city to the bishop. At the time the city was obliged to provide ground for the military. The military gave the area the name Etterstadsletta, and was in use as a training field until 1881. In 1821, King Charles XIV John ordered an exercise with 6,000 soldiers as a political power demonstration aimed at the newly formed parliament. The field was also the site of executions, the last performed on 19 April 1864 on the Prussian Friedrich Wilhelm Priess and the Dane Knud Fredrik Christian Simonsen by Samson Isberg with an audience of 5,000 people. The field was also used for Harness racing until 1928.

The first demonstration of aviation in the country was performed by the Swedish aristocrat Carl Cederström from 14 to 23 October 1910. After many successful demonstrations, on the final day Cederström lost control of the aircraft at take-off; two people were hurt and the plane had to be sent to France for repairs.

The government took over the cost of the military in 1840, but city pressed to be allowed to build housing in the area. This was permitted in 1922, and Oslo Bolig- og Sparelag started construction in the 1930s in a large reconstruction of all property down to the railway station. The plans were abandoned due to World War II, and changed afterwards. In 1967 the Oslo T-bane replaced the Oslo Tramway.
