= Murder of Knut Grøte =

1863 murder in Norway

The murder of Knut Grøte took place in Christiania, the capital of Norway, on 10 August 1863. The case ended with the execution of the two killers in April 1864. The public beheadings at Etterstad, which were executioner Samson Isberg's last commissions, were attended by about 5,000 spectators.

== Murder and investigation ==
The victim, Knut Grøte, was a farmer from Lærdal Municipality. He had arrived at Christiania in late July 1863, bringing several barrels of salmon, which he sold at the marketplace. Grøte was reported missing the day after the murder, and one week later, his body was found floating in the fjord. He had been cut in the neck and also shot in the head.

The subsequent investigations revealed that Grøte was killed by Prussian Friedrich Wilhelm Priess and Danish shoemaker Knud Christian Frederik Simonsen from Odense; both had settled in Christiania.

On 10 August Priess had ordered a large quantity of fish from the farmer. He pretended being a sailor, and asked that the salmon be brought out to "his" ship in the harbor. Priess and Simonsen rented a rowing boat, and later the same day they met Grøte, who followed them to the boat along with the salmon. The three started rowing outwards, and while in the boat, Grøte was killed near the island of Hovedøya. He was both shot and stabbed with a knife. The yield from the robbery was 140 speciedaler. The corpse was thrown into the sea, attached to a stone with rope, which later helped in tracking the killers. The next week, the body was discovered. Investigations revealed that the rope had belonged to the rented boat. The two killers had already left the country, though. They were later found in Copenhagen, arrested and brought back to Christiania.

== Conviction and execution ==
Priess and Simonsen were convicted and condemned to death by the Supreme Court on 10 February 1864. The executions took place at Etterstad on 19 April 1864. The beheadings were done by executioner Samson Isberg, and they were his last two commissions. The executions were attended by a crowd of about 5,000 spectators. Priest Johann Henrik Møhne assisted Priess and talked over the verse Romans 6:23. While Møhne read the Lord's Prayer, Isberg chopped off Priess' head, and his body was placed in a coffin. After cleaning off the scaffold, the priest Jørgen Tandberg assisted Simonsen, who talked to the public about his miserable life. Tandberg then talked over the verse Genesis 9:6. While Tandberg read the Lord's Prayer, Isberg cut off Simonsen's head.

In his book on the history of Christiania, Simon Christian Hammer characterizes the murder case as maybe the most sensational affair of its kind in Christiania in the 19th century.
