= Alf Saltveit =

Norwegian writer (1946–2022)

- Born: 14 June 1946; Haugesund, Norway
- Died: 18 May 2022 (aged 75); Haugesund
- Education: Schoolteacher
- Occupation: Writer

Alf Saltveit (14 June 1946 – 18 May 2022) was a Norwegian poet, novelist, non-fiction writer and translator.

== Literary career ==
With background as schoolteacher in Karmøy Municipality and Sveio Municipality, Saltveit made his literary debut in 1982 with the poetry collection Gneistar. He subsequently wrote novels, works on local history, and further poetry collections. His translations into Norwegian language include works by Seamus Heaney, Michael Krüger, Paul Muldoon and Carlos Drummond de Andrade.

Saltveit received a cultural stipend from Haugesund Municipality in 1986, and from the county municipality of Rogaland in 1987.

== Personal life and death ==
Saltveit was born in Haugesund on 14 June 1946. He died in Haugesund on 18 May 2022, aged 75.
