= Sten Egil Bjørnø =

Norwegian politician (born 1946)

Sten Egil Bjørnø (born 7 November 1946) is a Norwegian politician for the Labour Party.

He served as a deputy representative to the Parliament of Norway from Vestfold during the term 1985–1989. In total he met during 6 days of parliamentary session. He was an industrial laborer in Larvik Municipality.
