= Eirik Glenne =

Norwegian diplomat

Eirik Glenne (born 22 October 1946) is a Norwegian diplomat. He holds the cand.oecon. degree. He was the Norwegian ambassador to Malaysia from 1988 to 1992, was a deputy under-secretary from 1993 to 1995, then special adviser from 1995 to 1999. He was the Norwegian ambassador to Sweden from 1999 to 2003 and to the WTO and EFTA (in Switzerland) from 2003 to 2008. In 2000 he was decorated as a Commander of the Royal Norwegian Order of St. Olav.
