= Torbjørn Frøysnes =

Norwegian diplomat and politician

Torbjørn Frøysnes (born 11 December 1946) is a Norwegian diplomat and politician for the Conservative Party.

He was born in Arendal, and is a cand.polit. by education. He started working for the Norwegian Ministry of Foreign Affairs in 1973, but became a State Secretary from 1984 to 1986 as a part of the second cabinet Willoch. He served as a deputy representative to the Norwegian Parliament from Aust-Agder during the term 1989–1993. He chaired the Norwegian Tourist Board from 1988 to 1995, and then served at the Norwegian embassy in Bonn from 1995 to 1999. After another period in the Ministry of Foreign Affairs, in 2003 he became the Norwegian ambassador to the Council of Europe.
