= Sverre Stub =

Norwegian diplomat (born 1946)

Sverre Stub (born 24 February 1946) is a Norwegian former diplomat. Between 1971 and 2014, he served in various positions with the Norwegian Ministry of Foreign Affairs, including as the ambassador to Jordan from 2001 to 2006 and the ambassador to Greece from 2006 to 2011. He has specialized in the intersection of diplomacy and environmentalism, and he has advocated sustainability as a national security concern.

== Biography ==
Sverre Stub was born 24 February 1946. He is a siv.øk. by education and started working for the Norwegian Ministry of Foreign Affairs in 1971. He served with the Council of Ministers at the embassy in Paris from 1990 to 1994. Stub then worked as deputy director general of the Department of Natural Resources and Environmental Affairs within the Ministry of Foreign Affairs from 1994 to 1999. He served as an expedition manager from 1999 to 2000 and as a special adviser from 2000 to 2001.

Stub served as the Norwegian ambassador to Jordan from 2001 to 2006, and to Greece from 2006 to 2011. In 2010, he brought attention upon himself when he chose to cancel dinner with the Greek economic minister. Stub was at the Norwegian embassy in Greece while riots associated with the anti-austerity movement took place just 400 meters away. In his statement on the riots, he suggested that there was nothing to be concerned about and that Norwegian citizens should vacation in Greece. Elaborating, he sympathized with the cause of the protesters in Greece and said that Norwegian tourists would not notice any disturbances outside of Athens. After leaving Greece, Stub then served as a senior adviser in the Ministry of Foreign Affairs from 2011 to 2014. Stub has since retired from the foreign service.

== Environmentalism ==
Stub was involved with the creation of the Brundtland Report for sustainable energy, Our Common Future, in 1987. In his work with the Ministry of Foreign Affairs, he believed that environmental issues were security issues that would exacerbate tensions between nations and make violent conflict more likely. He argued that responsibility to address environmental issues existed "at local, national, regional, intergovernmental, and global levels". He has advocated changes in the developed world to how much consumption takes place and in what way it takes place to achieve sustainability based on the Agenda 21 plan. According to Stub, a successful long-term plan to address environmental issues would benefit development, democracy, and stability.
