= Svein Koningen =

Norwegian artist

Svein Koningen (born 1946) is an abstract expressionist painter born in Trondheim Norway, childhood in Amsterdam, education in Australia, lives and works in Bruges, Belgium.

== Biography ==
Koningen was born to a Norwegian mother and Dutch father during the war whilst his father was stationed in Oslo, working with the Dutch underground. Koningen spent his early childhood in Amsterdam where his introduction to art began with visits to see the Dutch masters at the Rijksmuseum. Koningen's parents moved to Australia in the late 1950s where he excelled at swimming. He studied art and industrial design at the Geelong's Gordon Institute of Technology. Koningen has lived in Norway, Netherlands, Australia, Dutch Antibes, France, UK, moving his studio from Noosa Heads, Australia to Brugge Belgium in 2005 until the end of 2016. He has now relocated back to Australia.

Svein's artist Statement 2019 - 'Creating began for me at the age 4 building a boat at my Dutch uncles Riva Boat factory in Amsterdam. My first gallery visit was age 3, visiting Rembrandt’s Night Watch at the Rijksmuseum… a rather daunting painting for a small child.

Studying art and industrial design I quickly found abstract painting was a passion that continues today.

A blank canvas becomes a story… the paint, the brush with the subconscious flow, all coming together creating on good days a vibrant abstract story on canvas.

Exploring the relationship between colour combinations and texture, working intuitively using large palette knives then paring and scraping back paint revealing glimpses and stories within the larger abstract story. Heavy texture is the focus of the 2017 Paradisaea Series of seven paintings. The series is primarily abstract with the title being the name of the Birds of Paradise, from Papua New Guinea. The series title came after the completion of the works and seeing the colourful abstract birds in flight.

I can work on colour and texture in a series but I seem to always go back to the Black White, maybe it is my retreat place from colour. Black White painting has been a constant in my studio Work with the latest being inspired by the Belted Galloway cow in a lonely wintery paddock in southern Netherlands, near Cad Zand. The paintings in this small series have texture surfaces and then the black has been polished to give the appearance of leather.

Change is a constant in my work and my life with movement the place to live giving new experiences which of course comes alive on the canvas in the studio. Moving my studio from Noosa Heads Australia to Bruges, Belgium and now, back to Australia.

Moving forward with a new studio is once again the challenge with a blank canvas.'

== Works ==
Koningen's work is abstract expressionist. The artist's inspiration comes through the process of painting his large canvases. Music plays an important role in the painting process transporting emotion into rhythm. Russu, Petru (October 2003), "Art in Australia" (PDF), World of Art, Sweden: 24

"I'm not afraid to explore and experiment with different tools to create texture on my canvas. I love the excitement of sweeping back thickly layered fresh paint and cutting into previous layers to reveal an extraordinary montage of fleeting colours, as though looking into the secret soul of the painting. While I may begin a painting with a vision of a certain colour or a specific theme, I never really know exactly what form the finished painting will take. I simply allow my instinct to guide my hands and draw inspiration from the creative process. My passions, the place I live in, the surrounding environment and my music are all external factors that influence my work."

Koningen, Svein. "About Koningen".

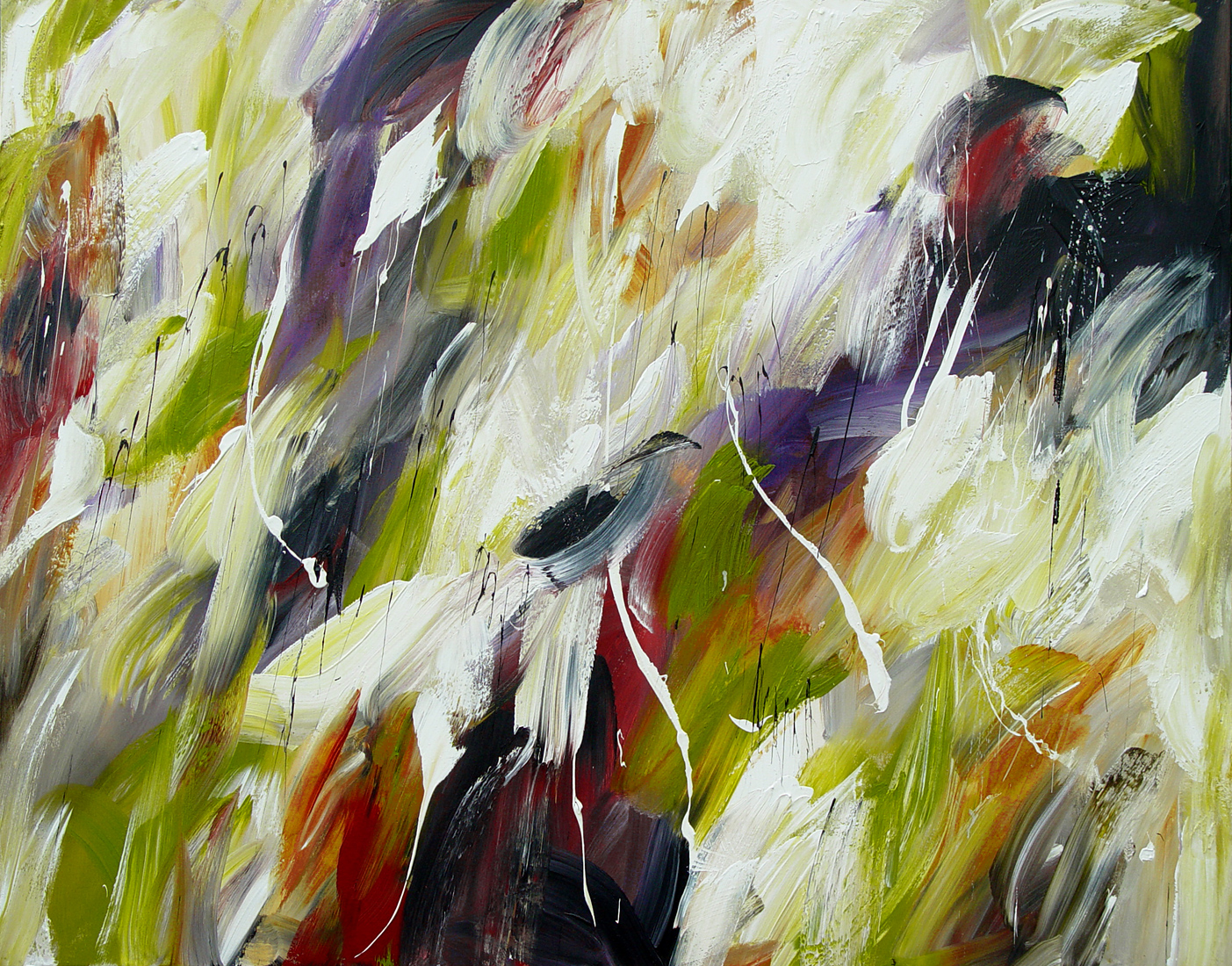
Grape Harvest

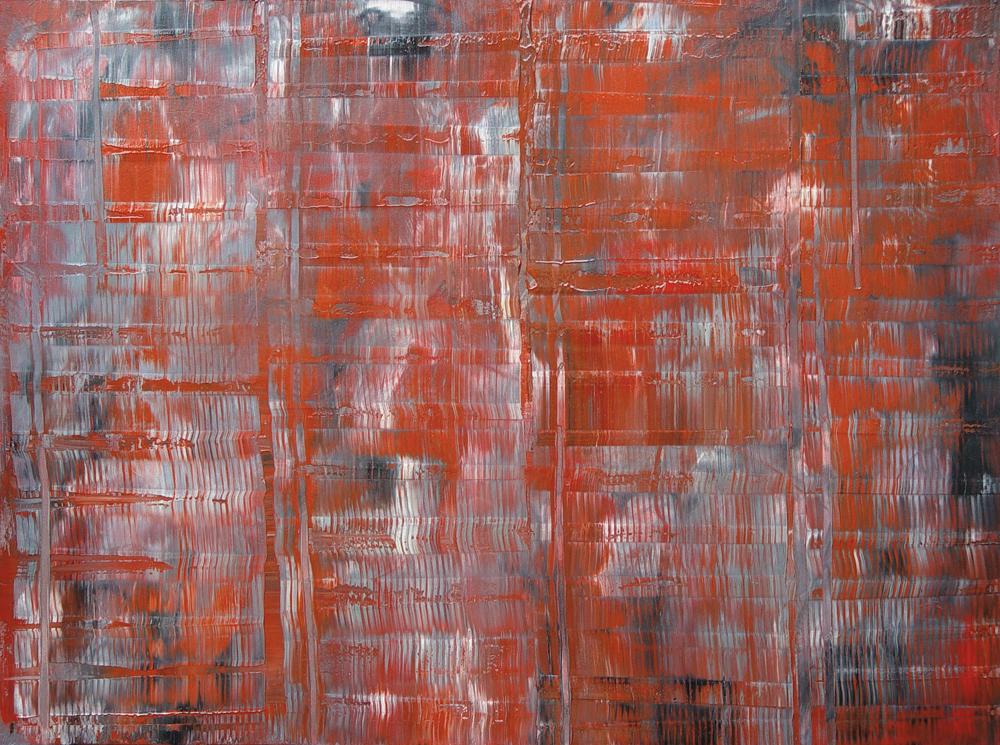
Murano

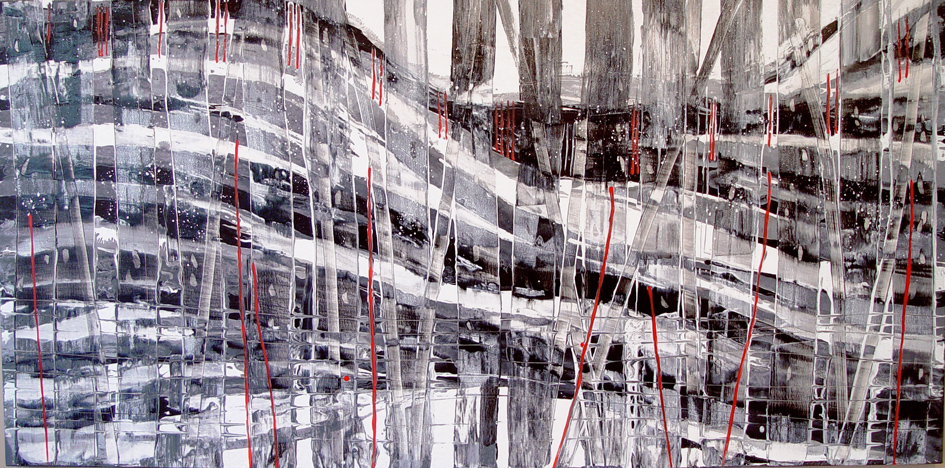
Luminous

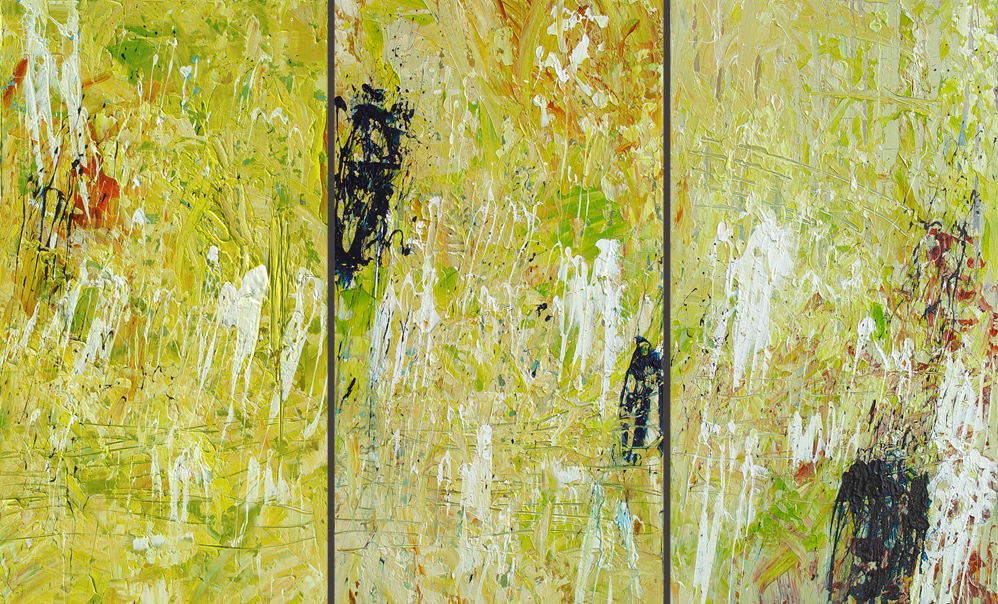
Day at the races

== See also ==
- Abstract expressionism
- Gerhard Richter
- Willem de Kooning
- Wassily Kandinsky
- Jackson Pollock
