= Willy Ustad =

Norwegian novelist (1946–2026)

Willy Ustad (16 May 1946 – 29 March 2026) was a Norwegian novelist.

== Early life ==
Ustad was born in Trondheim on 16 May 1946. He grew up in a heavily forested part of Trøndelag. Ustad was an army employee until he was 30, and later a metalworker and active union member. Health problems forced him to stop working in the factory, and he started writing full-time.

== Writer ==
Ustad was a popular novelist, publishing close to 80 titles from 1989 to 2015. He was a member of the Norwegian Authors' Union. The Union has a literary council. Members must have at least two works judged to have literary value.

Of several series, his most popular is Fire søsken (Four Brothers and Sisters) (42 books). Others are Opprør (Uprising) (about 1960s type radicalism, 7 books) and Vokterne (The Guardians), an X-Files-like science fiction series of 6 for young adults.

== Death ==
Ustad died on 29 March 2026, at the age of 79.

== Style ==
=== Settings ===
His books depend heavily on his background, as well as extensive research.

They are often placed in Trøndelag, both in the largest city Trondheim, in smaller industrial cities, the countryside and unpopulated forests and mountain landscapes. They may continue into the large forests of Sweden across the border, or occasionally further, including the Soviet Union, Japan and the United States.

=== Characters ===
Military and security personnel, industrial workers and working women - often unwed mothers - as well as small farmers and city criminals are among those who populate his books. Most of them have female heroes.

== Themes ==
His tales mix historical and social realism with the fantastic in the form of ghost stories, local legends and science fiction. Many have spy themes come from the Cold War. Some are realistic crime stories, some fantasies, several are airplane thrillers (among them a book about the U-2 Crisis of 1960), some are documentary novels about historical themes, while one or two are erotic novels.

== Linkages ==
Most of his books link with each other through common characters, settings and themes. A novel about the Norwegian prewar detective hero Knut Gribb describes the building of a factory that is important later in Fire Søsken. Characters from that series participate in the series Vokterne. A priest described in a historical novel about the Black Death makes an appearance as a ghost several hundred years later in a Fire søsken novel. In one sense, they might be regarded as parts of a still expanding mega-novel.

== Legends ==
One of his early non-series books, Ulvetid (A Time of Wolves) describes the flight of a slave girl during the late Viking age, into a forest where she joins a group of wolves. This is based on a local legend. On her way she passes through a large battle, and she meets the hulder, a supernatural woman that belongs to the subteranians still feared in remote parts of Norway.

The novel was sold in the museum shop at Stiklestad in Trøndelag, that commemorates the Battle of Stiklestad in 1030, where Olaf II of Norway fell. He was later sainted as St. Olav, Norway's patron saint, with a wide cult around the North Sea in Catholic times.

Ustad wrote a couple of non-fiction books about flying saucers.

== Social issues ==
Social issues have been the driving force behind many of Ustad's books.

== Tyskertøs ==
The Fire Søsken series started with the novel Tyskertøs (a derogatory word about girls who went with Germans during the Nazi occupation), about a girl who has an out-of-wedlock baby with a German soldier on the day the war ends in 1945. It tells the story about the persecution of these women during the liberation days, which has been a taboo theme in Norway.

The book set a record as the up to then best-selling first novel in a series, and was made into a radio play for the official Norwegian channel NRK.

The main protagonist in Tyskertøs, Lena Karlsbu and her very diverse brothers and sisters become the heroes (and sometimes antiheroes) of the rest of the series. They became a vehicle that allowed Ustad to excavate several taboo real-life stories in later books. As he continued exploring this in the series, he received death threats from people who thought he was writing about abuse they had been involved in during the 1940s.
