= Knut Hove =

Norwegian veterinarian (born 1946)

Knut Hove (born 21 February 1946) is a Norwegian veterinarian.

He was born in Oslo. He took the dr.scient. degree in 1974, and the dr.med.vet. degree in 1978. In 1987 he was appointed as professor the Norwegian College of Agriculture. He became rector there in 2000; the institution changed its name to the Norwegian University of Life Sciences in 2005.

Academic offices
Preceded by	Rector of the Norwegian University of Life Sciences (Norwegian College of Agriculture until 2005); 2000–present	Incumbent
