= Gunn Imsen =

Norwegian educationalist

Gunn Imsen (born 11 June 1946) is a Norwegian educationalist.

She took her undergraduate education at the University of Oslo. She has been a professor at the Norwegian University of Science and Technology since 1993. Notable publications include Elevenes verden. Innføring i pedagogisk psykologi (1984) and Lærerens verden. Innføring i generell didaktikk (1997).
