= Arild Braastad =

Norwegian diplomat (1946–2011)

Arild Braastad (18 August 1946 – 29 July 2011) was a Norwegian diplomat. He started working for the Norwegian Ministry of Foreign Affairs in 1979. He served as head of department in the Ministry of Foreign Affairs from 1999 to 2001, and was the Norwegian ambassador to South Korea from 2001 to 2006 and to Malaysia from 2006 to his death. During his ambassadorship in South Korea, Braastad initiated the establishment of the Norwegian Business Association (NBA) in Korea in October 2002, building on informal networks among Norwegian companies operating there.
