= Hans Aall =

Norwegian librarian and museum director

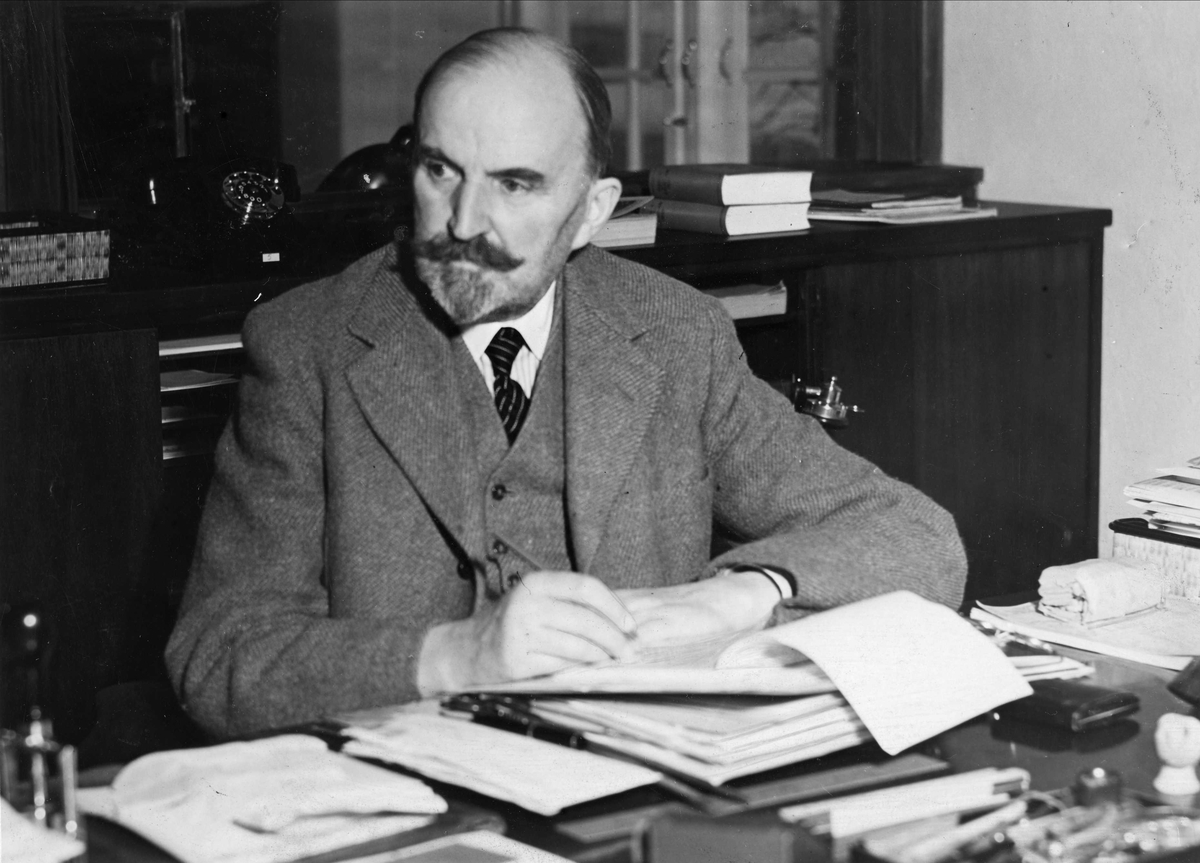
- Hans Jacob Aall (c.1935)
- Born: 20 September 1869; Arendal, Norway
- Died: 6 November 1946 (aged 77); Oslo
- Occupation: Museum director
- Known for: Founding director of the Norwegian Museum of Cultural History
- Relatives: Niels Aall (great-grandfather); Axel Nicolai Herlofson (uncle)

Hans Jacob Aall (20 September 1869 in Arendal – 6 November 1946 in Oslo) was a Norwegian librarian and museum director.

He was born in Arendal to ship owner Diderik Maria Aall and Marie Elisabeth Herlofson. He was a great-grandson of Niels Aall, and nephew of Axel Nicolai Herlofson, and a member of the Aall family which originates in Denmark (Aal Sogn) in the 1500s. He graduated with an examen philosophicum degree (roughly equal to a bachelor's degree) in philosophy in 1890. He married Emma Lund in 1901, but she died already in 1908. They had no children.

Aall was the founding director of the Norwegian Museum of Cultural History, which was established in 1894, and chaired the museum for 52 years until his death in 1946. He was decorated Knight of the Order of St. Olav in 1909, and Commander in 1929. He was Commander of the Order of Vasa, and Grand Knight of the Icelandic Order of the Falcon.
