= Rasmus Pedersen Thu =

Norwegian photographer (1864–1946)

Rasmus Pederson Thu (7 January 1864 in Klepp - 8 January 1946 in Stavanger) was a Norwegian photographer noted for documenting life along the coast of Norway and among Norwegian Americans in the late 19th century. He worked for some time with Anders Beer Wilse and traveled to the United States several times.
