= Ola Bertelsen =

Norwegian jurist and politician (1864–1946)

Ola Bertelsen (10 October 1864 – 26 November 1946) was a Norwegian jurist and politician for the Liberal Left Party.

Born in Haugesund as the son of a bricklayer, he enrolled as a law student in 1883 and graduated as cand.jur. in 1888. He worked as an attorney in his hometown, before being appointed chief of police in 1911. In 1917 he was appointed estate administrator. Finally, from 1921 to 1934 he worked as district stipendiary magistrate (sorenskriver) of Karmsund.

He was a member of Haugesund city council from 1896 to 1898, later serving as mayor from 1904 to 1907. He served as a deputy representative to the Norwegian Parliament during the term 1931–1933, representing the Market towns of Vest-Agder and Rogaland counties.
