= Olav Terje Bergo =

Norwegian former newspaper editor

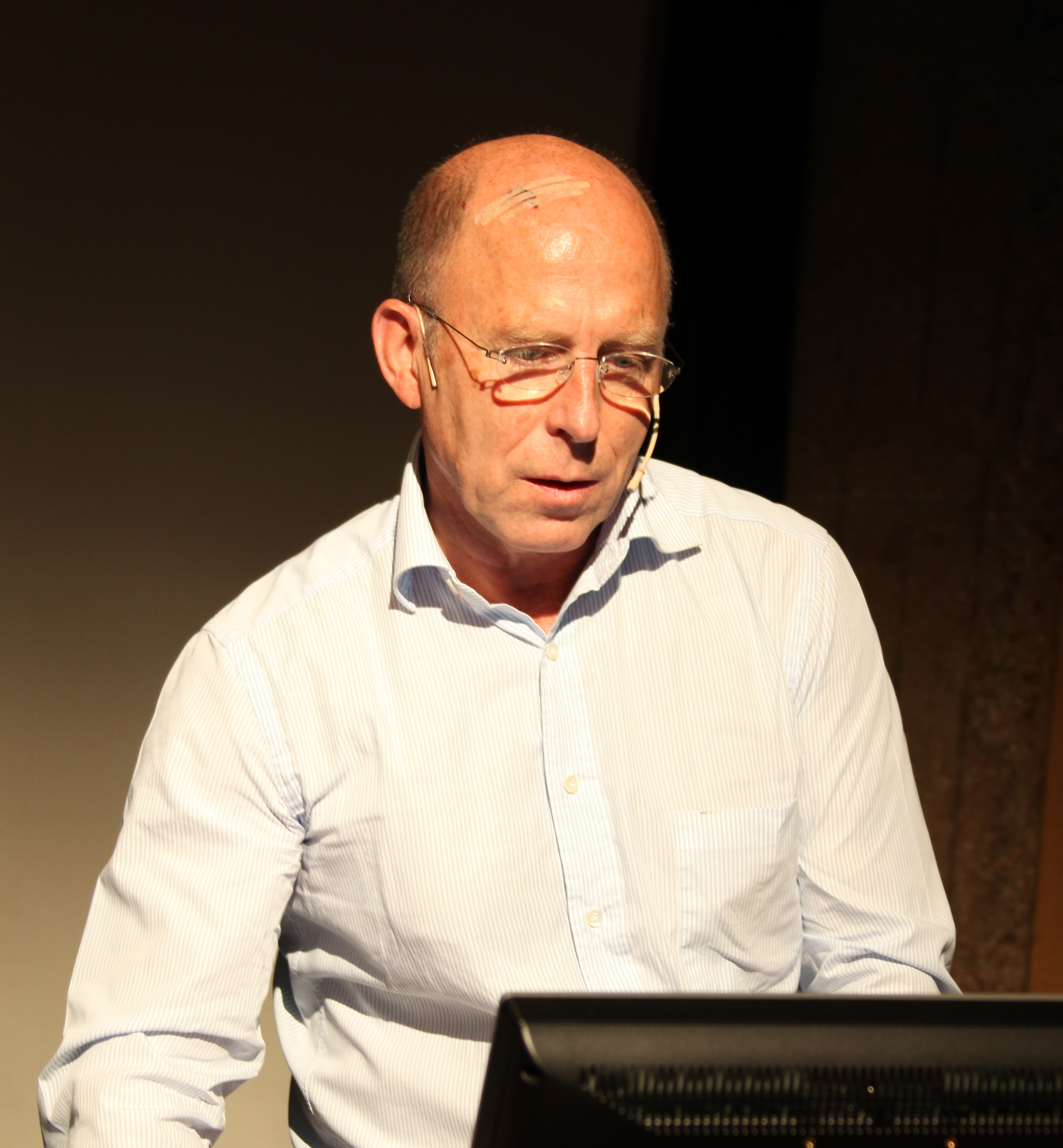

Olav Terje Bergo (born 8 October 1946) is a Norwegian former newspaper editor.

Bergo was born in Nes, Hallingdal. He was the chief editor of Bergensavisen (BA) from 1984 to 2009, and was chairman of the board of the Norwegian Media Business organization from 2002 to 2005. Previously, he was a board member of the European National Publishers Association (ENPA), and, from 2001 to 2006, he was on the board of the World Association of Newspapers (WAN).
