= Throndhjems Stiftstidende =

Norwegian newspaper

Throndhjems Stiftstidende was a newspaper published in Norway between 1836 and 1854. It reported mostly on foreign affairs.
