= Norwegian Climate and Pollution Agency =

Norwegian government agency

- Klima- og forurensningsdirektoratet

Agency overview
- Headquarters: Oslo
- Employees: 325
- Parent agency: Norwegian Ministry of the Environment
- Website: www.klif.no

The Norwegian Climate and Pollution Agency (Norwegian: Klima- og forurensningsdirektoratet, Klif), named Norwegian Pollution Control Authority (Norwegian: Statens forurensningstilsyn, SFT) until 2010, was a Norwegian government agency from 1974 to 2013 when it was merged into the Norwegian Environment Agency.

The agency was responsible for ensuring that pollution, waste and other harmful substances did not result in health damage, inflict the well-being or hinder the production and reproduction of nature. In particular it had a responsibility of pollution related to sea and water, chemicals, waste and recycling, global warming, air pollution and noise.

It was subordinate to the Norwegian Ministry of the Environment and was responsible to ensure that the Pollution Act, the Product Control Act and the Climate Quota Act were followed, including issuing permits for submission, including controlling that these permissions are followed. The agency had 325 employees based in Oslo.
