= Ministry of Climate and Environment (Norway) =

Government ministry of Norway

Royal Ministry of Climate and Environment
- Det kongelige klima- og miljødepartementet

Agency overview
- Formed: 8 May 1972
- Jurisdiction: Government of Norway
- Headquarters: Oslo
- Minister responsible: Andreas Bjelland Eriksen, Minister of Climate and Environment
- Agency executive: Tom Rådahl, Secretary General
- Website: www.regjeringen.no/kld

Footnotes
- List of Norwegian ministries

The Royal Norwegian Ministry of Climate and Environment (Norwegian: Klima- og miljødepartementet, KLD) is a Norwegian ministry established on 8 May 1972. The Ministry of Climate and Environment has a particular responsibility for carrying out the climate and environmental policies of the Government. Before 2014 the name was Ministry of the Environment (Norwegian: Miljøverndepartementet).

It is led by the Minister of Climate and Environment, currently Andreas Bjelland Eriksen (Labour Party) since 2023. The ministry reports to the legislature (Storting).

== Organisation ==
=== Political staff ===
As of 20 November 2023, the political staff of the ministry is as follows

- Minister Andreas Bjelland Eriksen (Labour Party)
- State Secretary Ragnhild Sjoner Syrstad (Labour Party)
- State Secretary Kjersti Bjørnstad (Labour Party)
- Political Adviser Maria Varteressian (Labour Party)

=== Departments ===
The ministry is divided into six departments and an information section:

- Department for Climate Change
- Department for Cultural Heritage Management
- Department for Marine Management and Pollution Control
- Department for Nature Management
- Department for Organizational Affairs
- Department for Planning
- Information section

=== Subsidiaries ===
Under the ministry there are five administrative agencies

- Norwegian Directorate for Cultural Heritage
- Norwegian Cultural Heritage Fund
- Norwegian Biodiversity Information Centre
- Norwegian Centre against Marine Litter
- Norwegian Environment Agency
- Norwegian Meteorological Institute
- Norwegian Polar Institute
- The Svalbard Environmental Protection Fund

== See also ==
- Minister of Climate and the Environment (Norway)
