= Nordhagen =

Nordhagen is a surname of Norwegian origin. It may refer to:

- Christine Nordhagen (born 1971), Canadian Olympic wrestler
- Johan Nordhagen (1856–1956), Norwegian artist

- Olaf Nordhagen (1883–1925), Norwegian architect, engineer, and artist; son of Johan
- Rolf Nordhagen (botanist) (1894–1979), Norwegian botanist; son of Johan

- Per Jonas Nordhagen (1929–2025), Norwegian art historian; son of Rolf
- Rolf Nordhagen (physicist) (1927–2013), Norwegian physicist and computer scientist; son of Rolf

- Wayne Nordhagen (born 1948), American professional baseball player
