= Martha Gladtved-Prahl =

Norwegian politician

Martha Christine Gladtved-Prahl (née Nordhagen) (26 July 1891 – 5 July 1973) was a Norwegian politician for the Conservative Party.

== Early life and family ==
She was born in Kristiania as a daughter of Johan Nordhagen (1856–1956) and Christine Magdalene, née Johansen (1858–1933). She was a sister of Rolf Nordhagen and Olaf Nordhagen. She is aunt to art historian Per Jonas Nordhagen and computer scientist Rolf Nordhagen.

After finishing her secondary education in 1909 she married Haakon Glatved-Prahl (1875–1958) in 1911 and settled in Alversund.

== Political career ==
She served as a deputy representative to the Parliament of Norway from Hordaland during the terms 1945–1949 and 1950–1953. In total she met during 6 days of parliamentary session. She was a longtime member of Alversund municipal council and served as deputy mayor from 1951 to 1955, as well as a board member of Hordaland Conservative Party.

She chaired several local and regional committees on health and homemaking, was a board member of Nasjonalforeningen mot tuberkulosen from 1936 and deputy chair from 1947 until 1960, when she retired and was proclaimed an honorary member. She was a board member of Norges Husflidslag from 1954 to 1965. A co-owner of the factory where her husband was managing director, she was also a supervisory council member of Vaksdal Mølle from 1956 to 1964.

== Recognition ==
Gladtved-Prahl was decorated with the King's Medal of Merit in gold and as a Knight of the Order of the Falcon.
