= Edvard Hambro =

Norwegian politician (1911–1977)

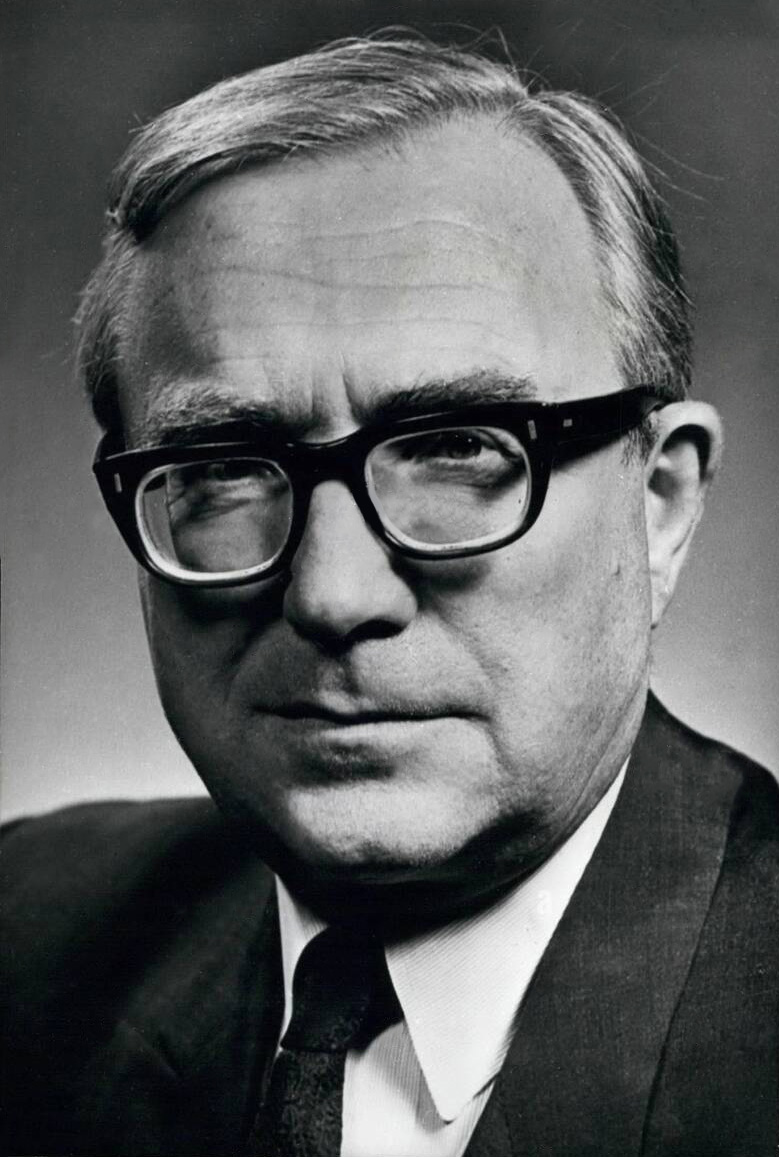
- Hambro, c. 1971

25th President of the United Nations General Assembly
- In office 1970–1971
- Preceded by: Angie Brooks
- Succeeded by: Adam Malik

Registrar of the International Court of Justice
- In office 1946–1953
- Preceded by: Office established
- Succeeded by: Julio López Oliván

Personal details
- Born: Edvard Isak Hambro; 22 August 1911 Kristiania, Norway
- Died: 1 February 1977 (aged 65) Oslo, Norway
- Party: Conservative
- Profession: Jurist, diplomat, politician

Edvard Isak Hambro (22 August 1911 – 1 February 1977) was a Norwegian legal scholar, diplomat and politician for the Conservative Party. He was the 25th President of the United Nations General Assembly (1970–1971).

== Personal life ==
Hambro was born in Kristiania as a son of the politician C. J. Hambro (1885–1964) and his wife Gudrun Grieg (1881–1943). On the paternal side he was a grandson of Edvard Isak Hambro and Nico Hambro (née Harbitz). He was also a nephew of Elise Hambro, a brother of Cato, Carl Joachim and Johan Hambro, and from 1946 a stepson of Gyda Christensen. In 1940 he married Elisabeth Raverat, daughter of the French artist Jacques Raverat and his English wife, the artist Gwen Darwin, a granddaughter of Charles Darwin. They had the following children Anne (born 1941), Carl Joachim (born 1944), Christian (born 1946) and Linda Hambro (born 1948). Elisabeth died in 2014.

== Early career and World War II ==
He finished his secondary education in 1929, enrolled in law studies at the Royal Frederick University and graduated with the cand.jur. degree in 1934. In 1931 he chaired the Conservative Students' Association. In 1936 he obtained a docteur ès sciences politiques degree from Geneva's Graduate Institute of International Studies with the thesis L'Éxécution des sentences internationales. With a Rockefeller grant he studied abroad before being hired as international director at the Chr. Michelsen Institute in 1938.

In 1940 Norway was attacked by Germany. During the subsequent fighting Hambro was a liaison officer for British forces in Western Norway, but later in the same year he fled via London to the United States. He was a guest scholar at the Northwestern University from 1941, and secretary-general in Norse Federation and editor of their magazine Nordmanns-Forbundets Tidsskrift from 1941 to 1943. He then returned to London to work in the Norwegian Ministry of Foreign Affairs-in-exile until the war's end. He was decorated with the Defence Medal 1940–1945.

== Professorship, Parliament and United Nations ==
After the war Hambro specialized in international organizational work. He was a Norwegian delegate to the San Francisco Conference in 1945, and led the United Nations judicial office until 1946. In 1946 he issued the Charter of the United Nations. Commentary and documents together with Leland Goodrich. From 1946 to 1953 he was the Registrar of the International Court of Justice in The Hague.

He was then a research fellow at the Norwegian School of Economics from 1953, visiting scholar at the University of California in 1958 and professor of jurisprudence at the Norwegian School of Economics from 1959 to 1966. Academic publications in the Norwegian language include Norsk fremmedrett (1950), Folkerettspleie (1956), Jurisdiksjonsvalg og lovvalg i norsk internasjonal kontraktsrett (1957) and Arbeidsrett (1961). He also wrote volumes II, III (spanning two books) and IV (spanning two books) in the series The Case Law of the International Court of Justice together with Arthur W. Rovine.

He was also elected to the Parliament of Norway from Bergen in 1961, and was re-elected in 1965. He served his first term in the Standing Committee on Justice, and then entered the Standing Committee on Foreign Affairs.

In 1966, however, he aborted his political career to become the Norwegian permanent representative to the United Nations. He chaired the Sixth Committee (Legal Committee) at the 22nd United Nations General Assembly in 1967. He was the 25th President of the United Nations General Assembly from 1970 to 1971. 122 delegations voted for Hambro with 2 votes against his candidacy. He underlined that "peace, justice and progress" will be topics during his presidency in which he wanted to strengthen the organization. After his tenure as permanent representative ended, he continued serving the Ministry of Foreign Affairs and was the Norwegian ambassador in Geneva, to EFTA and various UN organizations. From 1976 he was the Norwegian ambassador to France. He also served on the United Nations International Law Commission from 1972. He died in 1977.

Hambro was also a board member of the Institute for Comparative Research in Human Culture and the Nansen Foundation, and from 1960 to 1966 vice president of the Norwegian Red Cross.

He chaired the appeals board of the Council of Europe, and was a member of the appeals board of the Organisation for Economic Co-operation and Development. He presided over the Permanent Conciliation Commission for the Federal Republic of Germany and the Netherlands, and was a member of the Institute of International Law, the Permanent Court of Arbitration, and the Franco-German Arbitral Tribunal for the Saarland.

He received honorary degrees at Brandeis University, Columbia University, Luther College, Seton Hall University, University of Toronto, Wagner College and Yale University. He was decorated as a Commander with Star of the Order of St. Olav (1970), and received the Grand Cross of the Order of the White Rose of Finland, the Order of the Yugoslav Star and the Order of Ouissam Alaouite.

Diplomatic posts
Preceded by Sivert A. Nielsen	Permanent Representative of Norway to the United Nations; 1966–1971	Succeeded by Ole Ålgård
Preceded by Angie Elisabeth Brooks	President of the United Nations General Assembly; 1970–1971	Succeeded by Adam Malik
Preceded by Jahn Brochmann Halvorsen	Norwegian ambassador to France; 1976–1977	Succeeded by Hersleb Vogt
