= Jor =

Jor or JOR may refer to:

== People ==
- Finn Jor (born 1929), Norwegian journalist and writer
- Jorge Ben Jor (born 1945), Brazilian musician, singer and songwriter

== Places ==
- Jor (woreda), a woreda in the Gambela Region of Ethiopia
- Jor, Iran, a village in Sistan and Baluchesstan Province, Iran
- Jar, Iran, also spelled Jor, a village in Isfahan Province, Iran
- Jor Bagh metro station, Delhi, India

== Codes ==
- Jorá language, a Tupian language or dialect of Sirionó of Bolivia
- Jordan station, Hong Kong
- Jordanhill railway station, Glasgow, Scotland
- Jordanville railway station, Melbourne

== Other uses ==
- Jor (film), a 2008 Indian action thriller film
- Jor (music), a formal section of composition in Indian music

== See also ==
- Jor-El, fictional father of Superman
