= Carl Joachim Hambro =

Carl Joachim Hambro may refer to:

- C. J. Hambro (1885–1964), Norwegian journalist, author and Conservative Party politician
- Carl Joachim Hambro (banker) (1807–1877), founder of Hambros Bank, a United Kingdom investment banks
- Carl Joachim Hambro (philologist) (1914–1985), Norwegian philologist, essayist, novelist and translator
