= Rolf Nordhagen =

Rolf Nordhagen is the name of:

- Rolf Nordhagen (botanist) (1894–1979), Norwegian botanist
- Rolf Nordhagen (physicist) (1927–2013), Norwegian physicist and computer scientist
