= Christian Hambro =

Norwegian attorney and former civil servant

Johan Christian Georg Hambro (born 18 May 1946) is a Norwegian attorney and former civil servant.

He was born in the UK to his father Edvard Hambro and mother Elisabeth (née Raverat). His father's parents were C. J. Hambro and Gudrun (née Grieg) (both Norwegian); his mother's, Jacques Raverat (French) and Gwen (English). His mother's mother's grandfather was the naturalist Charles Darwin. His uncles included Cato, Carl Joachim and Johan Hambro.

He studied law at university and was the director of the Norwegian Pollution Control Authority from 1981 to 1986 and of Statskonsult from 1986 to 1992. From May to September 1986 he was a State Secretary for the Minister of Justice in the Brundtland's Second Cabinet. From 1992 to 1995 he was a sub-director in the private oil company Saga Petroleum. From 1995 to 2004 he was managing director of the Research Council of Norway.

Since 2004 he has been a partner in the law firm Gram, Hambro & Garman in Oslo. He has been chairman of the Norwegian chapter of Transparency International since 2010.

Preceded by Rolf Marstrander	Director of the Norwegian Pollution Control Authority; 1981–1986	Succeeded by Harald Rensvik
Preceded by Kåre Fløisand	Director of Statskonsult; 1986–1992	Succeeded by Tom Veierød
Preceded by Alf J. Raaum (acting)	Director of the Research Council of Norway; 1995–2004	Succeeded by Arvid Hallén
