= Johan Hambro =

Norwegian journalist and biographer

- Born: Johan Randolf Bull Hambro; 24 October 1915; Kristiania, Norway
- Died: 27 February 1993 (aged 77); Oslo, Norway
- Education: University of Oslo, Columbia University
- Occupations: Journalist, translator, biographer
- Notable work: C.J. Hambro: Liv og drøm
- Spouse: Lore Aickelin (married 1945)
- Parent(s): C. J. Hambro (1885–1964) and Gudrun Hambro, née Grieg (1881–1943)

Johan Randulf Bull Hambro (24 October 1915 – 27 February 1993) was a Norwegian journalist, translator and biographer. He was the fourth son of Norwegian politician C. J. Hambro, whose biography he wrote in 1984. He lived in the United States from 1939 to 1982, where he studied and worked as a foreign-affairs journalist, press attaché and consulate-general. He was secretary general of the Norse Federation for 27 years, from 1955 to 1982. He was decorated as a Knight, First Class of the Order of St. Olav in 1975.

== Family ==
Hambro was born on 24 October 1915 in Kristiania, the fourth son of politician C. J. Hambro (1885–1964) and his wife, Gudrun "Dudu" Grieg (1881–1943). He was a paternal grandson of Nico and Edvard Isak Hambro, and a brother of Carl Joachim and Edvard Hambro. His namesake was his second great-grandfather, Johan Randulf Bull (1749–1829), Norway's first Supreme Court Justice. Hambro married Lore Aickelin in 1945.

== Career ==
He grew up in the Uranienborg neighbourhood in the West End of Oslo, and enrolled at the Royal Frederick University in 1933. Following law studies, he graduated in 1939 with a cand.jur. degree, and travelled to the United States to study at Columbia University in New York. From 1940 to 1945, during the occupation of Norway by Nazi Germany, he was employed at the Norwegian general consulate in New York City. He worked as a foreign affairs journalist for the conservative newspaper Aftenposten from 1946 to 1948 and for the Norwegian News Agency from 1949 to 1953. He was a press attaché for the Norwegian United Nations delegation in 1953 and 1954. After that, he was stationed in New York as a foreign correspondent and radio chronicler for Norway.

In 1955, he succeeded Arne Kildal as secretary general of the non-profit Norse Federation, and became editor of its periodical, The Norseman. In 1957, Hambro was the chief editor of the Norse Federation's 50th anniversary book, De tok et Norge med seg ("They brought a Norway with them"). He edited its Christmas booklet, Norges Jul ("Norway's Christmas"), in 1975. Hambro was succeeded by Johan Fr. Heyerdahl as secretary general of the Norse Federation in 1982. Two years later, the federation started a summer course for Norwegian students, which it named after Hambro.

Hambro released a biography on his father, C. J. Hambro, in 1984, titled C. J. Hambro: Liv og drøm ("C. J. Hambro: Life and Dream"). The book was well received by critics, and sold more than 30,000 copies in 1984. The book is known for revealing many secrets about his father's private life, including his relationship with the actress Gyda Christensen. Like his father, Hambro translated many books from English to Norwegian, among them The Fountainhead by Ayn Rand in 1949, First Among Equals by Jeffrey Archer in 1985, and A Sport of Nature by Nadine Gordimer in 1988.

== Death and recognition ==
In 1958, Hambro was pronounced an honorary citizen of Minneapolis. He was given the Regents Award of St. Olaf College in 1972. Honorary degrees were bestowed by Luther College in 1969 and St. Olaf College in 1979. Hambro was decorated as a Knight, First Class of the Order of St. Olav in 1975. He died on 27 February 1993 in Oslo, at age 77.
