= Anglo-Norwegian Collaboration Committee =

Military committee during World War II

The Anglo-Norwegian Collaboration Committee, or ANCC, was a joint military committee during World War II composed of British and Norwegian military officers, which was tasked with controlling covert operations on occupied Norwegian territory and to ensure the 'harmonious working between British and Norwegians in this country [Great Britain] and full confidence and cooperation between them'.

The committee was established in order to counter the poor communication between the British and Norwegian governments regarding the deployment of Norwegian soldiers during British-supported operations.

It was established in 1942 on the request of the Norwegian politicians C. J. Hambro and Oscar Torp.
