= Socialist Group (disambiguation) =

Socialist Group is a primarily social-democratic political grouping in the Parliamentary Assembly of the Council of Europe.

Socialist Group may also refer to:

- Socialist Group (NATO Parliamentary Assembly), consists of members of social democratic and democratic socialist parties from NATO member states
- Socialist Group (UK), short-lived Trotskyist group in Britain during the mid-1980s
- New Left group, French parliamentary group in the National Assembly consisting primarily of members of the Socialist Party (PS)
- Socialist and Republican group, French parliamentary group in the Senate consisting primarily of members of the PS
- Progressive Alliance of Socialists and Democrats, political group in the European Parliament
