= Edvard Isak Hambro (educator) =

Norwegian educator (1847–1909)

Edvard Isak Hambro (3 July 1847 – 29 August 1909) was a Norwegian educator.

== Personal life ==
He was born in Bergen as a son of Carl Joachim Hambro (1813–1873) and Angelique Cathrine Bull (1813–1899). Edvard Isak Hambro had six sisters and one older brother. His paternal grandfather was a Danish Jew who had migrated to Norway in 1810. He was a maternal grandson of Georg Jacob Bull, brother-in-law of Nils A. Dahl, first cousin of Edvard Isak Hambro Bull and the judge Edward Isak Hambro, and a first cousin once removed of the British banker Charles Joachim Hambro.

In May 1880, in Bergen he married Nicoline Christine (Nico) Harbitz (1861–1926). They had the children Carl Joachim (C. J.) Hambro and Elise Hambro, and through C. J. Hambro they had the grandchildren Edvard Hambro, Carl Joachim Hambro and Johan Hambro.

== Career ==
He finished his secondary education in 1863, and first studied theology, then philology. He spent one year at the University of Copenhagen, but graduated from the Royal Frederick University in 1869 with the cand.mag. degree. He then studied Hebrew and Arabic as a research fellow in Germany, but stopped his scholarly career and instead became a language teacher (Greek, Latin, German) in the school system. He worked at Tanks School from 1871 to 1878, then founded his own school which he directed until his death. He was a modern educator in several respects; he introduced 45 minute lessons, more physical education and sloyd, and education for girls.

He contributed to the founding of Den Nationale Scene in 1876 and Bergens Aftenblad in 1880. He was affiliated with the Conservative Party for some time, but later cut his connections to the party; he served in Bergen city council from 1902 to 1904, elected from an "a-political ballot list".
