= Johan Fredrik Heyerdahl =

Norwegian publisher (1937–2021)

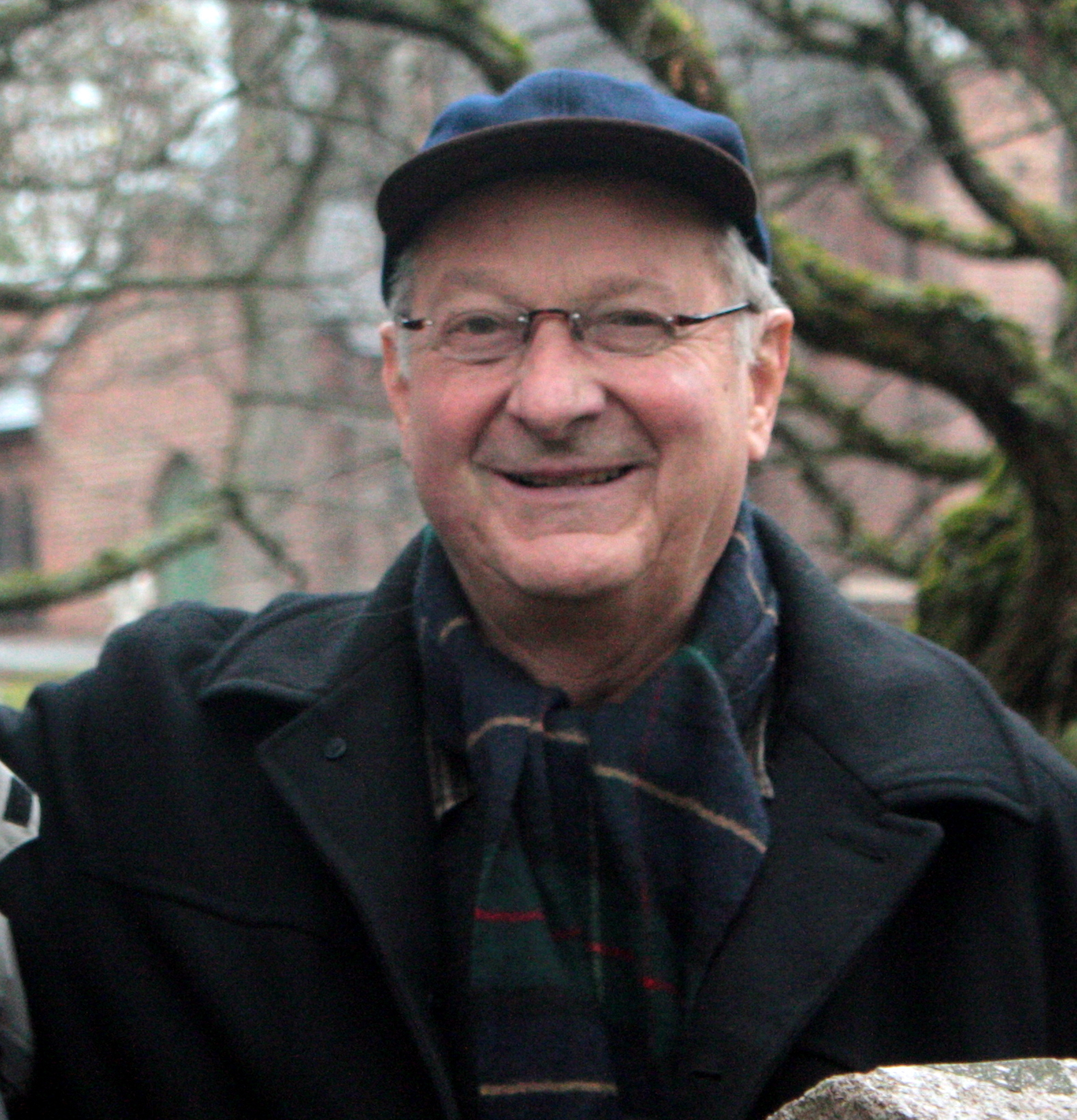
- Born: 21 October 1937; Oslo, Norway
- Died: 21 April 2021 (aged 83)
- Education: Journalist
- Occupations: Publisher, secretary general
- Organization: Norse Federation

Johan Fredrik Heyerdahl (21 October 1937 – 21 April 2021) was a Norwegian publisher. He was chief editor of the Den Norske Bokklubben from 1965 to 1983, and secretary general of Norse Federation (Nordmannsforbundet) from 1983 to 2000.

== Career ==
Born in 1937 in Oslo, Heyerdahl was a son of Thomas Mørch Heyerdahl and Sol Maurer, and married Else Adele Christensen in 1962. After examen artium in 1957 and studies at Journalistakademiet (1958), he worked as journalist from 1960 to 1963, and as public relations consultant from 1963 to 1965. He was then appointed chief editor of Den Norske Bokklubben from 1965 to 1983. From 1983 to 2000 he was secretary general of the Norse Federation (Nordmannsforbundet), and also edited the federation's periodical The Norseman. He was a literary critic for the newspaper Aftenposten from 1983 to 1990, and edited Norwegian Literature from 1990. He was board member of Norsk utvandrermuseum, and of The America-Norway Heritage Fund.

Heyerdahl died on 21 April 2021 at 83 years old.
