= Bergen Public Library =

Coordinates: 60°23′23.51″N 5°19′54.64″E

- Bergen Offentlige Bibliotek
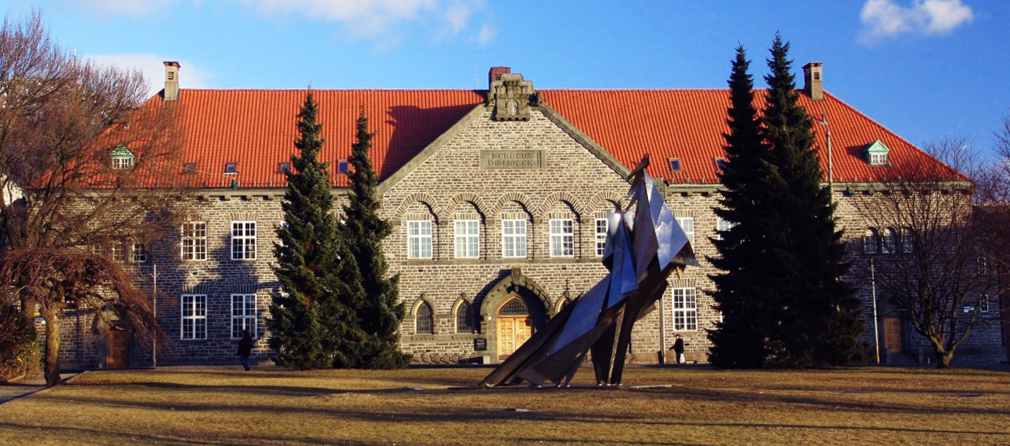
- Facade of Bergen Public Library
- Interactive map of the Bergen Public Library area

General information
- Type: Public library
- Location: Strømgaten 6, Bergen, Norway
- Completed: 1917; 109 years ago
- Owner: Municipality

Design and construction
- Architect: Olaf Nordhagen

Bergen Public Library (Norwegian: Bergen Offentlige Bibliotek) is a library building and public library institution in Bergen, Norway. Founded in 1872, it is the second largest public library in Norway. In addition to the main building in Bergen's city centre, Bergen Public Library operates nine branch offices and the library service in Bergen's two prisons.

== History ==
In the Middle Ages, Bergen and Trondheim were the main centres of literature in Norway, monasteries and churches containing the majority of books and libraries. St Mary's Church in Bergen possessed a large book collection that was open to the public. In 1766, vicar David Schønfeldt donated a large amount of books and money to the collection, allowing the church to construct a separate building to contain the library. Open two hours a day, this was the predecessor of the current library. In 1876, the church's collection was handed over to Bergen Public Library, where it was kept until the collection was deposited in the University Library of Bergen about a century later.

In 1869, university librarian Paul Botten-Hansen put his book collection, consisting of 12,000 volumes, for sale. A newly founded association decided to found a public library in Bergen, based on Botten-Hansen's collection. After the purchase of the collection in 1871, the association offered Bergen municipality to acquire the collection, on condition that it would cover the costs of operating a library. The first library building was located on Torgallmenningen, in a former brewery. This building would soon prove itself too small, however, and the library moved to the meat bazar, located along the inner harbour of the bay of Vågen. In 1910, Arne Kildal became chief librarian, and continued the effort to provide the library with its own, modern building.

The current building, built in the neo-Romanesque style, is designed by architect Olaf Nordhagen and was erected in 1917, after he won the 1906 architect competition.

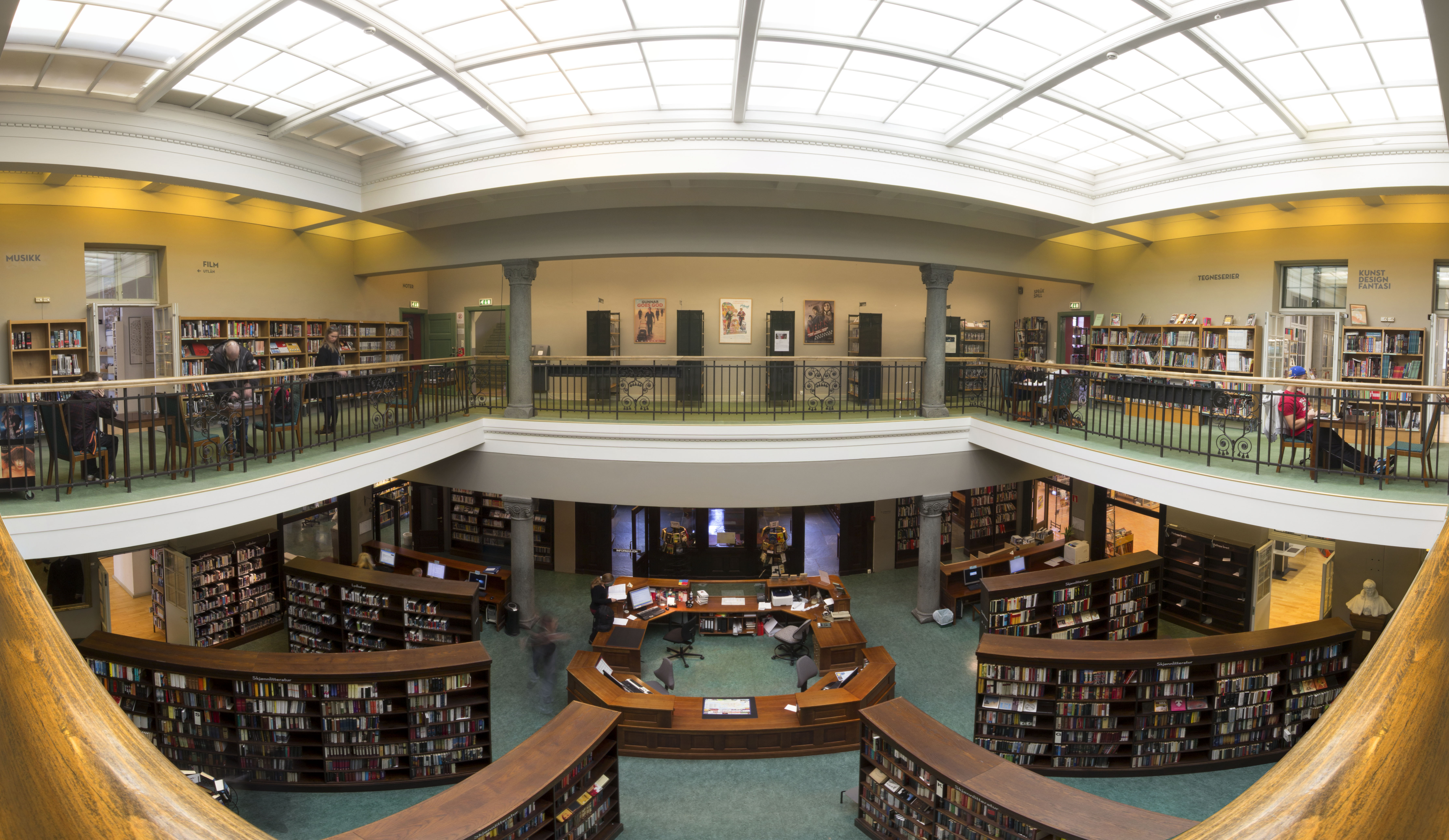
Interior of main room

== See also ==
- List of libraries in Norway
