= Hersleb Vogt =

Norwegian diplomat (1912–1999)

Hersleb Vogt (20 May 1912 – 9 November 1999) was a Norwegian diplomat.

== Biography ==
He was born in Kristiania (now Oslo). Norway. He studied law at the University of Oslo and graduated with a cand.jur. degree in law. He was hired in the Ministry of Foreign Affairs in 1936.

He worked as an embassy attaché in 1937 at Paris and Luxembourg and 1938 in Rome. In 1943 he joined the Norwegian Mission in Stockholm as Legation Secretary. From 1944 until the end of World War II he was first secretary and later head of section in the Norwegian State Department. In 1948 he became chargé d'affaires with Norwegian diplomatic missions in Brussels. In 1949 he was hired as an embassy counselor in the United Kingdom.

He served as the Norwegian ambassador to Japan from 1953 to 1958, to West Germany from 1958 to 1963, to Denmark from 1963 to 1967, to France from 1967 to 1973, to Sweden from 1973 to 1977 and France again from 1977 to 1980.

He was decorated as a Commander of the Order of St. Olav in 1961. He died in November 1999.

Diplomatic posts
Preceded by Peter Martin Anker	Norwegian ambassador to West Germany; 1958–1963	Succeeded by Paul Koht
Preceded by Rolf Andersen	Norwegian ambassador to France; 1967–1973	Succeeded by Jahn Brochmann Halvorsen
Preceded by Edvard Isak Hambro	Norwegian ambassador to France; 1977–1980	Succeeded by Georg Kristiansen
