= Brikt Jensen =

Norwegian publisher, writer, journal editor and professor

- Born: 15 September 1928; Bergen, Norway
- Died: 14 November 2011 (aged 83)
- Occupations: Publisher, writer, journal editor, professor

Brikt Jensen (15 September 1928 – 14 November 2011) was a Norwegian publisher, writer, journal editor, professor who also hosted a popular TV program about literature.

Jensen was born in Bergen, and was made a PhD in 1964 with a thesis on François Mauriac's Ormebolet. He was editor for the literary magazine Vinduet from 1964 to 1969. He was manager for the publishing house Gyldendal Norsk Forlag from 1970 to 1980, and senior consultant from 1980 to 1993. From 1984 to 1990 he also presented the television program Bokstavelig talt for the Norwegian Broadcasting Corporation, and from 1988 to 1992 he was a professor II in media studies at the University of Bergen. He was the chair of the Norwegian Publishers Association from 1972 to 1975.

== Selected bibliography ==
- Glimt fra det 20. århundres litteratur (1966)
- Brev fra et steinhus (1976)
- Hver dag (1980)
- Loggbok (1981)
- Det moderne gjennombruddet i nordisk litteratur (1986)
- Selvangivelse (1993)
- Min korsikanske landsby (1995)

Awards
Preceded by Carl Hambro	Recipient of the Bastian Prize; 1964	Succeeded by Sigmund Skard
