= Carl Hambro =

Norwegian novelist (1914–1985)

Carl Joachim Hambro
- Born: 7 June 1914; Kristiania, Norway
- Died: 19 February 1985 (aged 70)
- Occupations: Journalist, translator, novelist
- Notable work: De frafalnes klubb; Bjørnen sover; Ting, tanke, tale
- Spouses: Wenche Rynning Koren (born 1916) (m. 1939, divorced); Christine Holter (born 1931)
- Children: Hilde Hambro born (1962) Ellen Hambro born (1964)
- Parents: C. J. Hambro (1885–1964) (father); Gudrun Hambro, née Grieg (1881–1943) (mother)

Carl Joachim Hambro (7 June 1914 – 19 February 1985) was a Norwegian novelist, journalist, essayist, translator and Romance philologist. The son of the Conservative politician C. J. Hambro, he embarked on a philological career, graduating in 1939. During the Second World War he lectured at Oslo Commerce School and the Norwegian College in Uppsala. After the war, he taught Norwegian at Sorbonne, and also started working as Paris correspondent for the Norwegian Broadcasting Corporation and a few Norwegian daily newspapers.

Born into a well-read and educated family, Hambro developed a penchant for French literature, marking a distinction from the literary taste of his parents—they had been readers of English literature in the Anglo-American tradition. Making his debut in 1960 with the satirical novel De frafalnes klubb, Hambro published trilogies and other novels for the next two decades. He had a keen interest in linguistics; in the 1969 book Ting, tanke, tale he problematized linguistic questions in a popular scientific way. A translator of French literature, he chaired the Norwegian Association of Literary Translators in the early 1960s.

== Biography ==
=== Early life and education ===
Portrait of Carl Hambro
- Carl Hambro Portrait and encyclopedia entry at the Norwegian Association of Literary Translators
- https://www.oversetterleksikon.no/2018/03/06/carl-joachim-hambro-1914-1985/

Hambro was born in Kristiania (now Oslo), capital of Norway. He was the third of four sons born to Carl Joachim Hambro (1885–1964), the President of Parliament and long-time leader of the Conservative Party, and his first wife, Gudrun "Dudu" Grieg (1881–1943). On the younger Carl Joachim's date of birth, 7 June 1914, his father, for whom he was named, made a speech at the Jubilee Exhibition in the Frogner Park, which commemorated the 1814 constitution. The twins Edvard and Cato were Carl's elder brothers, who both made success within the Anglosphere: the former became the 25th President of the United Nations General Assembly and a respected legal scholar, whilst the latter became board member of the World Federation for Mental Health. The younger brother, Johan, was secretary general of the Norse Federation for 27 years in the post-war period, yet is remembered above all for his commercially successful biography of their father. Living in the Uranienborg neighbourhood of Western Oslo, the Hambro family belonged to the upper-class society of early 20th-century Norway, and was, according to biographer Tormod Petter Svennevig, intellectually engaged; its forebears included both businesspeople and women's rights activists, of whom many were active in politics.

The younger Carl Hambro was educated at Fagerborg Upper Secondary School, whence he graduated in 1932, following Latin studies. Among his school contemporaries were Niels Christian Brøgger, who became an essayist and novelist, and Kaare Martin, a future Nazi politician.

=== Journalistic and educational career ===
Having made study trips to London and Paris in the mid-1930s, Hambro graduated with a cand.philol. degree in 1939. In the summer of that year, on 15 July, he married Wenche Rynning-Koren (born 1916). Upon the outbreak of war, he was employed at the Oslo Commerce School, where he lectured until 1943. Hambro spent the latter part of the war in Uppsala, Sweden, where he taught at the Norwegian College and chaired the local Norwegian Society (1943–1944). After the war he returned to Oslo, teaching at the Commerce School until 1946. He had lectured in French literature at the Norwegian Library College in two intervals, during and after the war: from 1940 to 1941 and from 1945 to 1946. For the rest of the decade he taught Norwegian at Sorbonne, France. He also worked as a correspondent for the Norwegian Broadcasting Corporation (1946–1948), Dagbladet (1946–1948), Verdens Gang (1948–1949) and Arbeiderbladet (1949–1951). From 1951 to 1952 he was a press worker for the Research Councils in Norway and for the Norwegian delegation to the United Nations. In that decade he mainly acted as cultural counsellor at the Norwegian embassy in London. Employed in 1952, he acted in that position for seven years, whereupon he returned to Oslo. He was assistant teacher in French at the University of Oslo from 1963 to 1965; in that position he bemoaned the insufficient command of his students in their own mother tongue, maintaining that the Norwegian language should be used more actively in foreign-language tuition.

=== Literary career and death ===
Hambro made his literary debut in 1958 with the non-fiction book Frankrike ("France"), and released his first novel two years later. The novel, entitled De frafalnes klubb ("The Club of the Estranged"), was lauded by contemporary critics, but failed to arouse much subsequent interest from scholars. Hambro's reputation as a novelist rests more on his trilogy about the fictional character Nico Dietmeyer, deemed a Bildungsroman by academics. That work, serialised in the 1960s, was Hambro's first major commercial success, and has been reviewed in detail both by contemporaneous commentators and modern literary scholars. After a few unsuccessful novels in the late 1960s and early 1970s, Hambro pivoted towards non-fiction, especially focusing on linguistics and politics, fields of interest that he shared with his father, who had become fascinated by Sanskrit and East Asian poetry during his philology studies. The younger Hambro's most well-known and successful book within linguistics was the 1969 Ting, tanke, tale ("Thing, Thought, Speech"), followed by Språket i funksjon ("Language in Operation") in 1972.

Having divorced Rynning Koren, Hambro eventually married Christine Holter (born 1931). Their daughter Ellen Hambro would later become Director of Norway's Climate and Pollution Agency. Carl Joachim Hambro died on 19 February 1985 and was buried in Grefsen. Hambro's obituarist Finn Jor described him as a man fond of debate with a keen interest in societal issues, yet who was no front person in public discourse, not possessing the eloquence of his father.

== Authorship ==
In 1958, Hambro released a non-fiction book titled Frankrike (English: France), as a tribute to the country in which he had spent most of his early adulthood. His love for France was not inherited from his parents, however: the elder Carl Joachim and Dudu were fervent anglophiles, the former having both written and translated English-language works, and the latter having been a voracious reader of Anglo-American novelists ranging from Rudyard Kipling to Aldous Huxley.

His debut novel, the satirical De frafalnes klubb, was published in 1960. It tells a story of some disillusioned cynics in Paris who create a new philosophical and literary "-ism," which gains worldwide popularity. According to reviewer Brikt Jensen, Hambro offered a critique of "the modern type of man [who embraces] the first philosophical system that comes to sight." Jensen also commended Hambro for his "un-Norwegian" perspective, calling him a "distinguished European." The literary scholar Willy Dahl opined that the novel denoted Hambro's declared scepticism towards "every sort of intellectual or political pigeonholing," a scepticism that he shared with his father C. J. Hambro, whose disdain for radical and totalitarian ideologies was well known.

The elder Hambro was also, according to literary scholar Per Thomas Andersen, vital for the next literary work of the younger Hambro: he provided biographical context for a trilogy comprising the novels Frels oss fra det gode (1963; "Deliver Us From the Good"), Utfor stryket (1964; "Down the River") and Vi vil oss en drøm (1966; "We Want a Dream"), which describe the adolescence of a young man named Nico Dietmeyer. Living in the upper-class society of Western Oslo in the 1930s, Dietmeyer has an authoritarian father who commits adultery, despite personally emphasising decorum in his moral system. The first of them was favourably reviewed by Brikt Jensen in Verdens Gang, who called it "a declaration of love for Oslo". Reviewing for the same newspaper, Ragnhild Lorentzen gave the second novel a laudatory review, praising Hambro for having taken an important task upon his shoulders, whilst simultaneously criticising him for blurring the line between adolescence and adulthood. Dahl maintained that these novels constituted an unpretentious, yet clear-eyed criticism of conformity in that milieu, whilst Andersen considered them stories about double standards and liberation from one's own father. Rottem maintained that the novel was autobiographical, and that Hambro tried to polemise against the extramarital relationship that his father had enjoyed with actress Gyda Christensen. 1966 proved to be a fruitful year for Hambro: he first contributed to the lightly pornographic literary collection Norske sengehester ("Norwegian Bedposts"), and subsequently, in September, delivered a vehement critique of the Norwegian education system in the pamphlet Er gymnasiaster mennesker? ("Are Graduates People?"). The last novel of his trilogy about Nico Dietmeyer was released in November of the same year; Lorentzen deemed the first part of the book to be somewhat verbose, inconclusive and unoriginal, yet also well-written.

In 1967 Hambro released Bjørnen sover ("The Bear Is Sleeping"), a marriage novel that disappointed the critics, before publishing his semantic and psycholinguistic study Ting, tanke, tale ("Thing, Thought, Speech") in 1969. The journalist Iver Tore Svenning recognized that work as one of the very few successful attempts at a popular scientific treatment of structural linguistics, a view supported by Dahl. Hambro's last novels were Nødhavn ("Harbour of Refuge") and Lekkasje ("Leakage"), released in 1971 and 1974. The former book is about a love affair between an erstwhile cultural radical and a young woman with aggressive political opinions. The affair makes, according to Dahl, the cultural radical think about his nonconformist past, yet he abandons it, and seeks safety in the bourgeoisie class.

Hambro continued to write, albeit more in the non-fiction genre: in the 1970s he penned numerous articles on political and literary topics for Norwegian newspapers and periodicals. He particularly contributed to the periodicals Vinduet and Samtiden. In 1972 he resumed his endeavour to popularise linguistics: together with Erik Rudeng and Knut Svortdal he compiled Språket i funksjon ("Language in Operation"), a primer on language comprehension and essay writing. Rudeng later recalled that it cited philosophers and linguists hitherto unknown in Norwegian public discourse, like Michel Foucault (1926–1984) among others. In the latter part of his life Hambro wrote monographs on the Norwegian authors Jens Bjørneboe and Arnulf Øverland; he also compiled a collection of the latter's poems. He was active in the Norwegian Authors' Union, becoming known as "a man of compromise" after having calmed a linguistic debate in the union. He also sought to relax the membership criteria, so that non-fiction authors also could become members, but to no avail. Yet, the Norwegian Non-fiction Writers Association was established in 1978. Hambro's good reputation dwindled with the years, especially following his vehement defence of the writers Agnar Mykle and Bjørneboe, who had been brought to court for their soft-core pornographic novels.

Hambro also translated the works of others, mostly French and English authors, among them the philosopher Jean-Paul Sartre, the French novelist Jacques de Lacretelle, the Canadian-American novelist Saul Bellow, the Irish playwright Samuel Beckett, the Northern Irish novelist Brian Moore, the Hungarian-British author Arthur Koestler, and the British novelist William Golding. In 1963 he was rewarded the Bastian Prize for his translation of Claude Simon's The Flanders Road. He chaired the Norwegian Association of Literary Translators from 1961 to 1965.

Awards
Preceded by Trygve Greiff	Recipient of the Bastian Prize; 1963	Succeeded by Brikt Jensen
