= Marit Nybakk =

Norwegian politician

Marit Nybakk MP
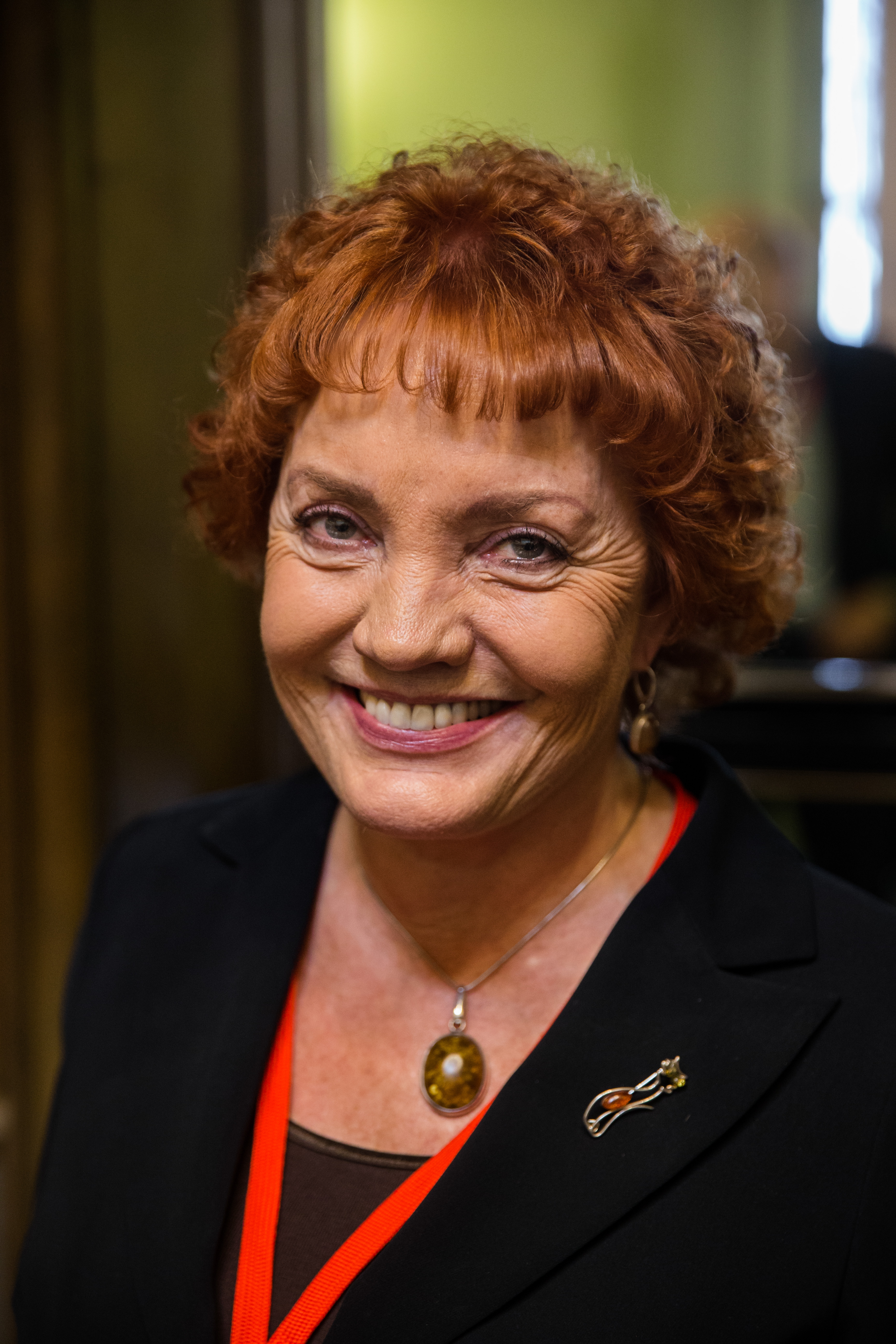

Member of Parliament for Oslo
- In office 9 May 1986 – 30 September 2017
- Preceded by: Gro Harlem Brundtland

31st President of the Norwegian Association for Women's Rights
- In office 21 May 2016 – 16 June 2018
- Preceded by: Margunn Bjørnholt
- Succeeded by: Karin M. Bruzelius

Third Vice President of the Storting
- In office 8 October 2009 – 30 September 2013
- President: Dag Terje Andersen
- Preceded by: Position established
- Succeeded by: Svein Roald Hansen

First Vice President of the Storting
- In office 8 October 2013 – 30 September 2017
- President: Olemic Thommessen
- Preceded by: Øyvind Korsberg
- Succeeded by: Eva Kristin Hansen

President of the Nordic Council
- In office 1 January 2013 – 31 December 2013
- Preceded by: Kimmo Sasi
- Succeeded by: Karin Åström

Personal details
- Born: 14 February 1947 (age 79) Nord-Odal, Hedmark, Norway
- Party: Labour

Marit Nybakk (born 14 February 1947, in Nord-Odal) is a Norwegian politician for the Labour Party, a former First Vice-president of the Norwegian Parliament, the Storting, and a former President of the Nordic Council. From 2016 to 2018 she was President of the Norwegian Association for Women's Rights, the preeminent women's and girls' rights organisation in Norway.

A pragmatic social democrat and a proponent of the Third Way, she became a Member of Parliament in 1986 as the substitute for Gro Harlem Brundtland when the latter became prime minister. In 2009 she became the Storting's Third Vice President, before becoming First Vice President in 2013. She did not stand for reelection in 2017; at that point she was both Norway's longest-serving incumbent member of parliament and the longest-serving woman of all times. Nybakk served as President of the Nordic Council for the term 2013.

Nybakk has been one of the Labour Party's principal politicians in foreign and defence affairs since the 1990s and has been her party's spokesperson on defence. She was Chairman of the Standing Committee on Defence between 2001 and 2005 and Vice Chairman of the Standing Committee on Foreign Affairs between 2005 and 2009. She is a former leader of the Socialist Group in the NATO Parliamentary Assembly.

== Education ==
Nybakk studied English, French, and political science in Oslo, Paris and Cambridge, and graduated with the cand.mag. degree at the University of Oslo in 1972. She also studied theatre and drama in Stratford-upon-Avon in 1974. As a student, she was a member of the university board of the University of Oslo, as the first woman to serve in that body. She was President of the Norwegian Students' and Academics' International Assistance Fund 1977–1981.

== Political career ==
=== Member of Parliament ===
Nybakk was elected as a deputy member of the Parliament of Norway, the Storting, for the Oslo constituency in 1985. As the deputy of Gro Harlem Brundtland, she became a substitute member of parliament in 1986 when Brundtland became prime minister. She became a full representative in 1987, following the death of Foreign Minister Knut Frydenlund. Nybakk was reelected as a member of parliament for the Oslo constituency in 1989, 1993, 1997, 2001, 2005, 2009, and 2013. She has for several years been the Labour Party's second candidate from the Oslo constituency, second only to party leader and Prime Minister (now NATO secretary-general) Jens Stoltenberg.

Since the 1990s, Nybakk has focused on foreign and defence policy, and has been one of the Labour Party's principal politicians covering this field. She was Chairman of the Standing Committee on Defence between 2001 and 2005 and Vice Chairman of the Standing Committee on Foreign Affairs between 2005 and 2009. She is a member of the Standing Committee on Foreign Affairs and Defence and the European Committee, and Chairman of the Preparatory Credentials Committee during the term 2013–2017. Nybakk has also been the Labour Party's spokesperson on defence.

Nybakk was Third Vice President of the Storting during the term 2009–2013, and was elected First Vice President in 2013.

In 2013 she became both the longest-serving incumbent member of the Norwegian parliament and the longest-serving woman of all times.

Nybakk has been a delegate to the United Nations General Assembly since 2004.

=== NATO Parliamentary Assembly ===
She was a delegate to the NATO Parliamentary Assembly from 2005 to 2013, and became leader of the Socialist Group in 2009.

=== President of the Nordic Council ===
In 2012, Nybakk was elected as the President of the Nordic Council for the term 2013. As president, she promoted Nordic defence cooperation and increased Nordic cooperation on rescue and emergency services.

=== Norwegian Confederation of Trade Unions ===
Nybakk was leader of the Oslo chapter of the Norwegian Confederation of Trade Unions (LO i Oslo) from 1992 to 1997.

=== Norwegian Association for Women's Rights ===
In May 2016 Nybakk was elected president of the Norwegian Association for Women's Rights, the main Norwegian advocacy group for women's and girls' rights, in succession to sociologist Margunn Bjørnholt. She was succeeded by Supreme Court Justice Karin M. Bruzelius on 16 June 2018. She became a board member of the Forum for Women and Development in November 2016.

=== Other offices ===
Nybakk was a member of the council of the Norwegian Agency for Development Cooperation 1978–1988, President of the Advisory Committee for Development Cooperation of the Nordic Council of Ministers 1984–1989 and President of the Council on Foreign Aid, a public advisory body appointed by the Ministry of Development Cooperation, from 1987 to 1988.

She is a member of the advisory board of the Oslo Center, founded by former Prime Minister Kjell Magne Bondevik, and a member of the council of SOS Children's Villages in Norway.

== Political positions ==
Nybakk is considered a Third Way pragmatic social democrat; she is widely described as a member of the right wing of the Labour Party.

=== Foreign and defence policy ===
Nybakk supports Norwegian membership in the European Union. Like the Labour Party itself and most Norwegian politicians, she supports Norway's NATO membership. She supported the war in Afghanistan, and argued that it liberated women in the country.

=== Women's rights ===
Nybakk has also advocated women's human rights, especially in states such as Iran and other areas of the Middle East. She was vice chair of the committee for human rights in Iran 1995–1997. In 2015, Nybakk and Liberal Party leader Trine Skei Grande boycotted a parliamentary delegation visiting Iran due to the requirement that female members would have to wear a chador, which they argued was discriminatory to women.

== Publications ==
- Nybakk, Marit; Kvedalen, Alexander, eds. (1999). Arbeiderbevegelsens århundre: 100 år i kamp og framgang: en billedkavalkade over viktige hendelser fra fagbevegelsens historie i Oslo (in Norwegian). Oslo: LO (Norwegian Confederation of Trade Unions).
