= Council on Foreign Aid =

Norwegian government agency from 1984 to 1988

- Rådet for norsk utviklingshjelp

Agency overview
- Formed: 1984; 42 years ago
- Dissolved: 1988; 38 years ago
- Jurisdiction: Government of Norway
- Headquarters: Oslo
- Parent agency: Ministry of Development Cooperation

The Council on Foreign Aid (Norwegian: Rådet for norsk utviklingshjelp) was a public body in Norway, established by the Parliament of Norway on 1 January 1984. It consisted of 20 members, appointed by the Ministry of Development Cooperation (later merged into the Ministry of Foreign Affairs). It was part of the official development aid apparatus of Norway, and had an advisory role in relation to the government. The council was dissolved in 1988. During its four-year existence, the council had two Presidents, Bjarne A. Waaler (1984–1986) and Marit Nybakk (1987–1988).
