= Bert Koenders =

Dutch politician and diplomat

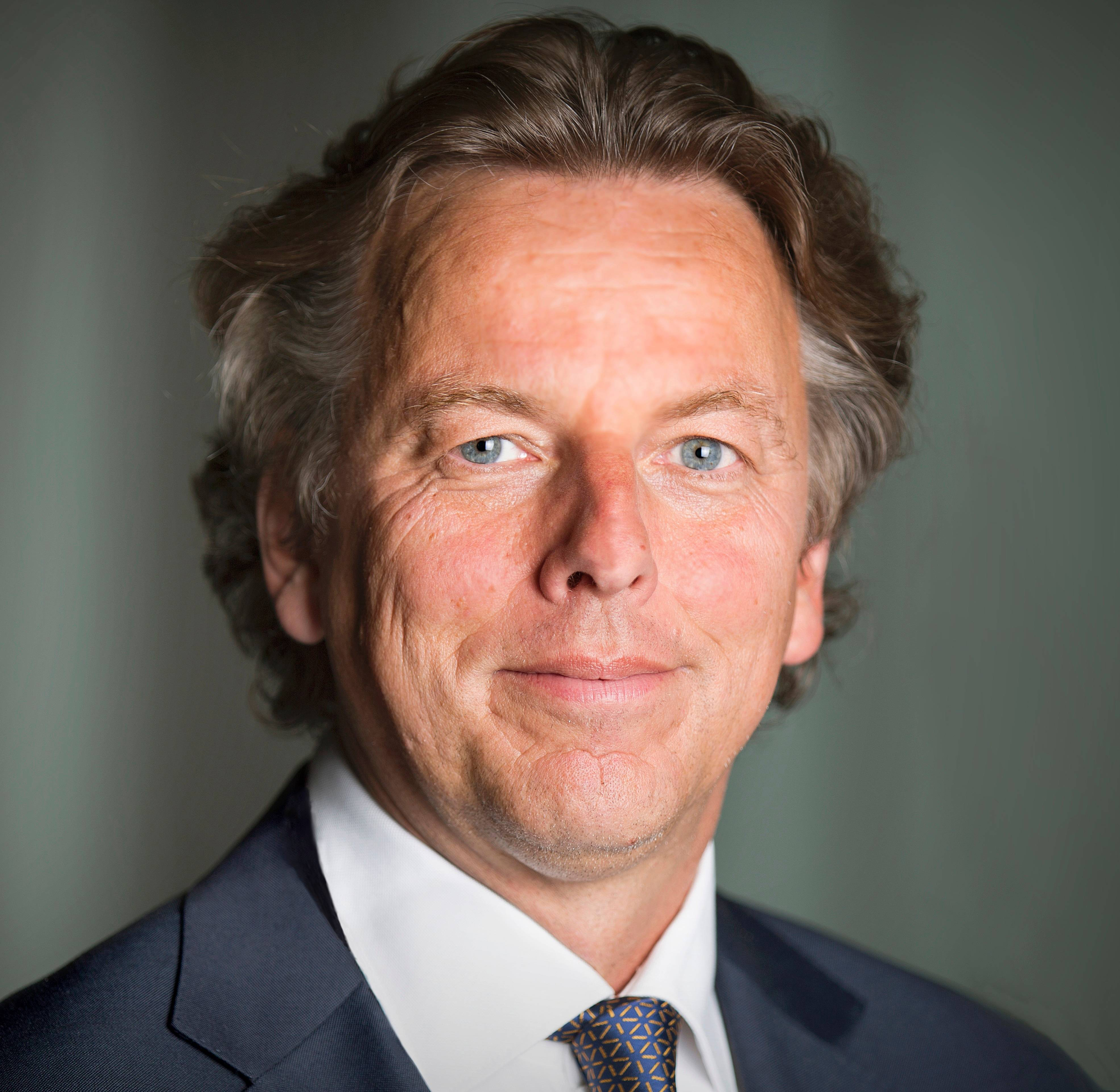
- Koenders in 2015

Minister of Foreign Affairs
- In office 17 October 2014 – 26 October 2017
- Prime Minister: Mark Rutte
- Preceded by: Frans Timmermans
- Succeeded by: Halbe Zijlstra

Special Representative for the United Nations in Mali
- In office 1 July 2013 – 17 October 2014
- Secretary-General: Ban Ki-moon
- Preceded by: Position established
- Succeeded by: Mongi Hamdi

Special Representative for the United Nations in Côte d'Ivoire
- In office 1 August 2011 – 1 July 2013
- Secretary-General: Ban Ki-moon
- Preceded by: Choi Young-jin
- Succeeded by: Aïchatou Mindaoudou

Minister for Development Cooperation
- In office 22 February 2007 – 23 February 2010
- Prime Minister: Jan Peter Balkenende
- Preceded by: Agnes van Ardenne
- Succeeded by: Maxime Verhagen

President of the NATO Parliamentary Assembly
- In office 17 November 2006 – 19 February 2007
- Preceded by: Pierre Lellouche
- Succeeded by: José Lello

Member of the House of Representatives
- In office 11 November 1997 – 22 February 2007

Personal details
- Born: Albert Gerard Koenders; 28 May 1958 (age 67) Arnhem, Netherlands
- Party: Labour Party
- Education: Vrije Universiteit Amsterdam (BSS); University of Amsterdam (MSS); Johns Hopkins University (MA)

Albert Gerard Koenders (Dutch pronunciation: [ˈɑlbərt ˈxeːrɑrt (bɛrt) ˈkundərs]; (Note: In isolation, Gerard is pronounced [ˈɣeːrɑrt].) born 28 May 1958) is a Dutch politician of the Labour Party (PvdA) who served as Minister of Foreign Affairs from 2014 to 2017. He is currently a professor at Leiden University and a special envoy of the World Bank. He is also chair of the Dutch Advisory Council on International Affairs, a member of the board of trustees of the International Crisis Group and a commissioner of the International Commission on Missing Persons.

Koenders studied political science at the Vrije Universiteit Amsterdam and the University of Amsterdam, and completed a second master's in international relations at Johns Hopkins University. He was a member of the House of Representatives from 1997 to 2007 and served as Minister for Development Cooperation from 2007 until 2010. He later was the UN Secretary-General's Special Representative and Head of the United Nations Operation in the Ivory Coast (2011–2013), and Special Representative and Head of the United Nations Multidimensional Integrated Stabilization Mission in Mali (2013–2014). Koenders founded the Parliamentary Network on the World Bank/International Monetary Fund and has served as President of the North Atlantic Treaty Organization Parliamentary Assembly and leader of its Socialist Group.

== Biography ==
=== Early life ===
Albert Gerard Koenders was born on 28 May 1958 in Arnhem in Gelderland, where he grew up in a Reformed environment. He was a boy scout. He attended the secondary school Carolus Clusius College in Zwolle, where he completed the pre-university program.

Koenders studied political science at the Free University Amsterdam (sitting his candidates examination in 1978) and political and social sciences (international relations and economics) at the University of Amsterdam (graduating in 1983). He received his Master of Arts degree from Johns Hopkins University, where he studied at the School of Advanced International Studies in Bologna and Washington from 1979 to 1981.

Koenders is not married.

== Politics ==
=== Early career ===
Koenders was adjunct professor at Webster University in Leiden from 1987 to 1993. In 2002 he was visiting professor at Johns Hopkins University in Bologna teaching about conflict prevention and management, and post-conflict reconstruction. Due to his past experience of being a professor, he occasionally participates in lectures about specific aspects of political science at various universities around the Netherlands.

From 1983 to 1993, Koenders worked as an aide for the Labour Party in the House of Representatives. He served as an adviser to the United Nations Operation in Mozambique in the early 1990s, his first job outside the Netherlands. Between 1995 and 1997, he worked in the private office of Hans van den Broek, who was then the Dutch European commissioner and had shared responsibility for foreign policy. During that time, one of his tasks was defining the EU’s competences on foreign policy.

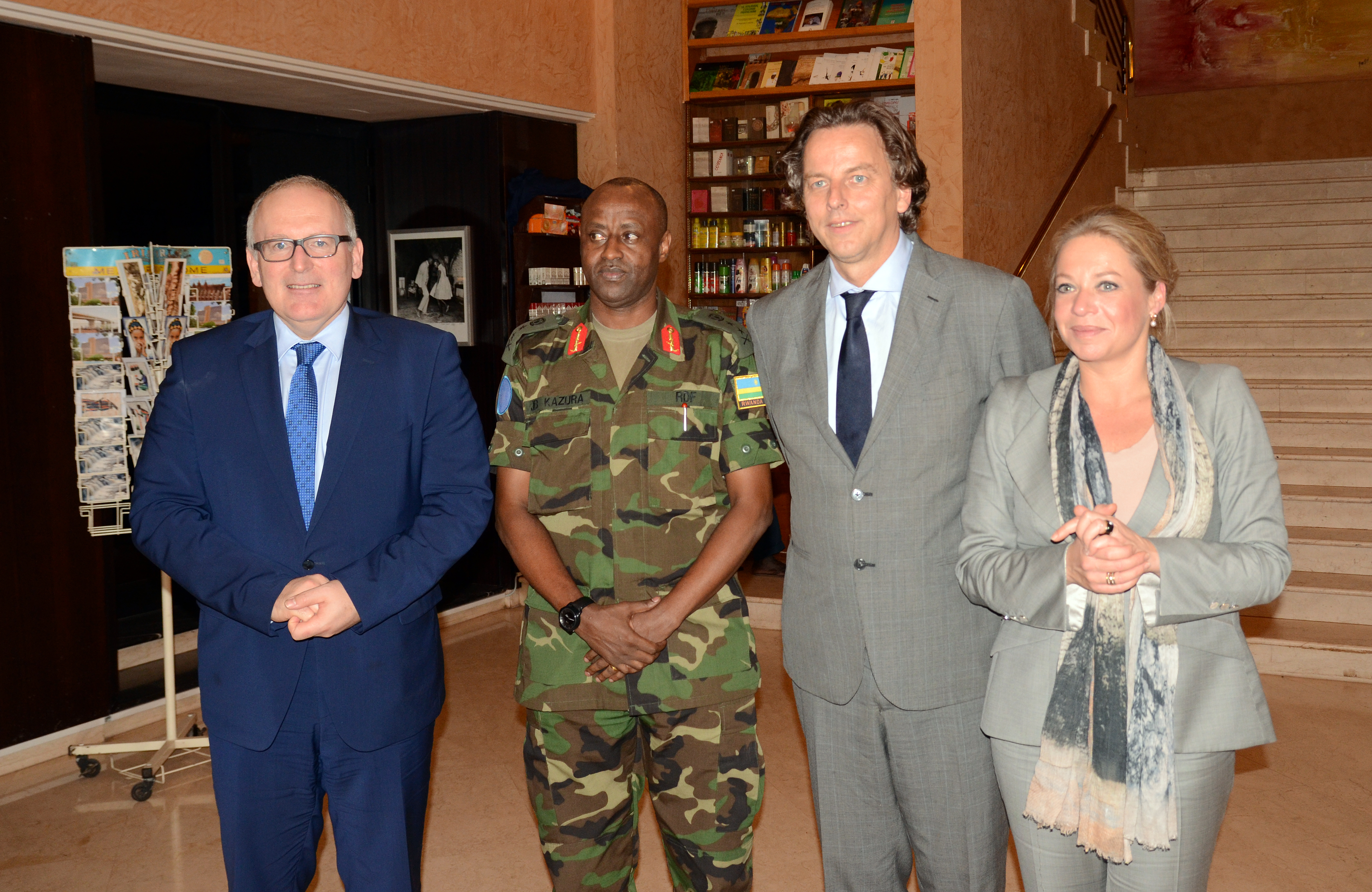
Minister of Foreign Affairs Frans Timmermans, Rwandan general Jean Bosco Kazura, Special Representative Bert Koenders and Minister of Defence Jeanine Hennis-Plasschaert in Bamako on 28 November 2013.

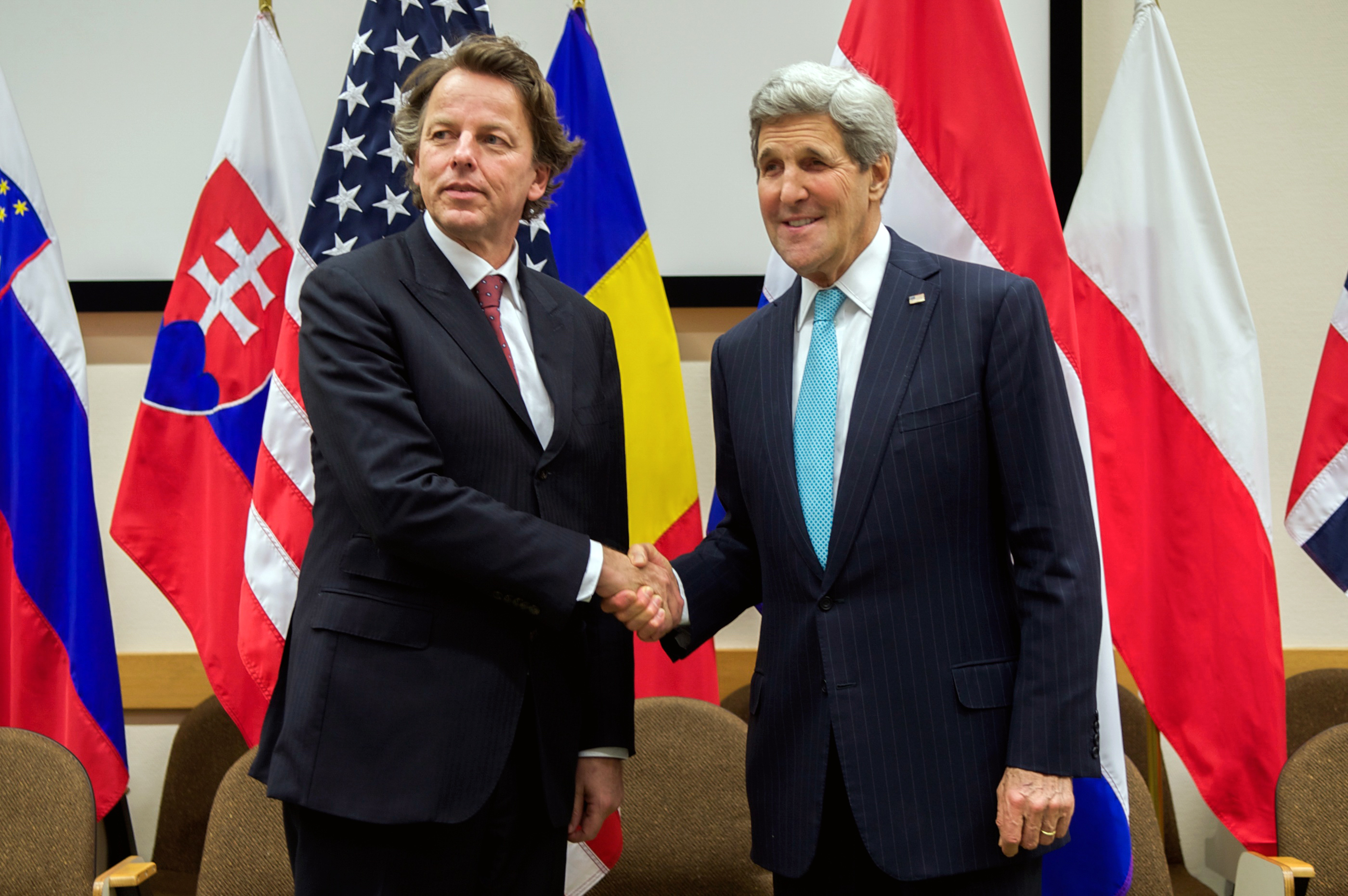
Minister of Foreign Affairs Bert Koenders and United States Secretary of State John Kerry at a NATO summit in Brussels on 2 December 2014.

=== House of Representatives ===
Koenders was a member of the House of Representatives from 1997 until 2007. In 1997, he filled the vacant seat after member of parliament Maarten van Traa died in a car accident. He was member of the permanent parliamentary committees on foreign affairs and on defense. From 2002 until 2003 he was a member of the parliamentary hearing committee on the Srebrenica massacre. From 17 November 2006 to 19 February 2007 he was president of the NATO Parliamentary Assembly.

=== Minister of Development Cooperation ===
Koenders was minister without portfolio for Development Cooperation (Ministry of Foreign Affairs) in the Fourth Balkenende cabinet sworn in on 22 February 2007.

He came under political fire as minister in July 2007, after it became known that an event sponsored by the Ministry, Het akkoord van Schokland, was organized without a public procurement process stipulated under European Union law. Instead, the event was organized by an event bureau closely tied to the Labour Party itself. Koenders cited time shortage.

Between 2008 and 2009, Koenders was part of a High-Level Taskforce on Innovative International Financing for Health Systems, which had been launched to help strengthen health systems in the 49 poorest countries in the world and was chaired by UK Prime Minister Gordon Brown and World Bank president Robert Zoellick. In 2009, he criticized Pope Benedict XVI for his assertion that distributing condoms is not the solution to AIDS and actually makes the problem worse.

=== United Nations ===
Between 2011 and 2013, he served as the UN Secretary-General's Special Representative and Head of the United Nations Operation in the Ivory Coast.

Between 2013 and 2014, he was the Special Representative and Head of the United Nations Multidimensional Integrated Stabilization Mission in Mali appointed by UN Secretary-General Ban Ki-moon.

=== Minister of Foreign Affairs ===
On 17 October 2014, Koenders succeeded Frans Timmermans as Minister of Foreign Affairs.

At the 2016 United Nations Security Council election, Koenders and his Italian counterpart Paolo Gentiloni agreed on splitting a two-year term on the United Nations Security Council after the United Nations General Assembly was deadlocked on whether to choose Italy or the Netherlands following five rounds of voting for the last remaining 2017/18 seat.

In December 2016, Koenders summoned Sadık Arslan, Turkey's ambassador in the Netherlands, after the De Telegraaf newspaper reported that the Turkish embassy had sent home a list of Dutch Turks who might have sympathized with the failed coup.

== Other activities ==
- International Crisis Group (ICG), Board of Trustees (since 2018)
- African Development Bank (AfDB), Ex-Officio Alternate Member of the Board of Governors (2007-2010)

== Decorations ==
Honours
Ribbon bar	Honour	Country	Date	Comment
	Chevalier of the Legion of Honour	France	2006	
	Companion of the Order of the Volta	Ghana	2008	
	Officer of the Order of Orange-Nassau	Netherlands	23 November 2010	
	Grand Cordon 1st Class of the Order of the Rising Sun	Japan	24 October 2014	

== Notes ==
Political offices
Preceded by Agnes van Ardenne	Minister for Development Cooperation; 2007–2010	Succeeded by Maxime Verhagen
Preceded by Frans Timmermans	Minister of Foreign Affairs; 2014–2017	Succeeded by Halbe Zijlstra
Diplomatic posts
Preceded by Pierre Lellouche	President of the NATO Parliamentary Assembly; 2006–2007	Succeeded by José Lello
Preceded by Choi Young-jin	Special Representative for the United Nations in Côte d'Ivoire; 2011–2013	Succeeded by Aïchatou Mindaoudou
New title	Special Representative for the United Nations in Mali; 2013–2014	Succeeded by Mongi Hamdi
