= Jahn Brochmann Halvorsen =

Norwegian diplomat

Jahn Brochmann Halvorsen (23 November 1916 – 13 May 1976) was a Norwegian diplomat.

He was born in Hadsel Municipality and took the cand.oecon. degree in economics. He was hired in the Ministry of Foreign Affairs in 1951. He was a councillor at the Norwegian NATO and OEEC embassy in Paris from 1955 to 1960 and a deputy under-secretary of state in the Ministry of Foreign Affairs from 1960 to 1965. He served as the Norwegian ambassador to Belgium—and also Luxembourg and the European Community—from 1965 to 1973, and then to France from 1973 to his death. He died in May 1976 in Paris.

Halvorsen was decorated as a Commander of the Order of St. Olav and held the War Medal.

Diplomatic posts
Preceded by Hersleb Vogt	Norwegian ambassador to France; 1973–1976	Succeeded by Edvard Isak Hambro
