= Norse Federation =

Norwegian non-profit organization

The Norse Federation (Norwegian: Nordmanns-Forbundet) is a Norwegian non-profit organization that was founded in 1907, and is under the patronage of the monarch of Norway, currently King Harald V. The organization states that its purpose is to "unit[e] friends of Norway throughout the world". As of 2010, the organization had approximately 3500 members. It publishes a periodical which is named The Norseman. The federation merged with the Norway-America Association (NORAM) in 2020.

== Structure ==
=== General secretaries ===
- Thoralv Klaveness (1908–1910)
- Carl Joachim Hambro (1910–1914)
- Wilhelm Morgenstierne (1914–1917)
- Simon Christian Hammer (1917–1920)
- Sigurd Folkestad (1920–1925)
- Arne Kildal (1925–1941 (WWII) and 1945 to 1955) *
- Edvard Hambro (USA) (1941–1945)
- Johan Hambro (1955–1983)
- Johan Fredrik Heyerdahl (1983–2000)
- Gunnar Gran (2000–2001)
- Kjetil A. Flatin (2001–2004)
- George A. Broch (2004–2008)
- Lasse Espelid (2008–2012)
- Hanne Aaberg (2012–present)

=== Presidents ===
- Carl Christian Berner (1906–1915)
- Fredrik Georg Gade (1915–1924)
- Carl Joachim Hambro (1924–1941 (WWII) and 1945 to 1946) *
- Didrik Arup Seip (1946–1954)
- Jacob S. Worm-Müller (1954–1960)
- Aksel Kvam (1960–1963)
- Thorolf Kandahl (1963–1974)
- Paul Thyness (1974–1980)
- Wilhelm Mohr (1980–1988)
- Inge Lønning (1988–1998)
- Kjetil A. Flatin (1998–2001)
- Lucy Smith (2001–2005)
- Hallgrim Berg (2005–2012)
- Tom Vraalsen (2005–2008)
- Erik Giercksky (2012–2014)
- Inger Prebensen (2014–present)
