= Elise Hambro =

Norwegian educator (1881–1966)

- Born: 27 August 1881; Bergen, Norway
- Died: 30 August 1966 (aged 85)
- Occupation: Educator
- Parents: Edvard Isak Hambro (father); Nicoline Hambro (mother)
- Relatives: C. J. Hambro (brother)

Elise Hambro (27 August 1881 – 30 August 1966) was a Norwegian educator. She is known for being the first female school principal in Norway, appointed head of Ulrike Pihl Girls School in Bergen from 1926. She was born in Bergen; the daughter of educator Edvard Isak Hambro and Nicoline Hambro, and was the sister of politician C. J. Hambro, president of the Parliament of Norway.
