= Willy Dahl =

Norwegian literary researcher and literary critic

- Born: 26 March 1927 (age 98); Bergen, Norway
- Occupations: Literary historian and literary critic.
- Employers: University of Trondheim; University of Bergen

Willy Dahl (born 26 March 1927) is a Norwegian literary researcher and literary critic.

== Biography ==
Born in Bergen on 26 March 1927, Dahl was a professor at the University of Trondheim from 1978, and at the University of Bergen from 1981 to 1992. He has written several books on literary history. He has been a literary critic for the newspaper Arbeiderbladet.

== Selected works ==
- Dahl, Willy (1975). Beyer, Edvard (ed.). Vår egen tid, 1945–70. Norges litteraturhistorie. Vol. 6. Oslo: Cappelen.
- Dahl, Willy (1981–1989). Norges litteratur. Oslo: Aschehoug. (3 volumes)
