= Arne Kildal =

Norwegian author, librarian and civil servant

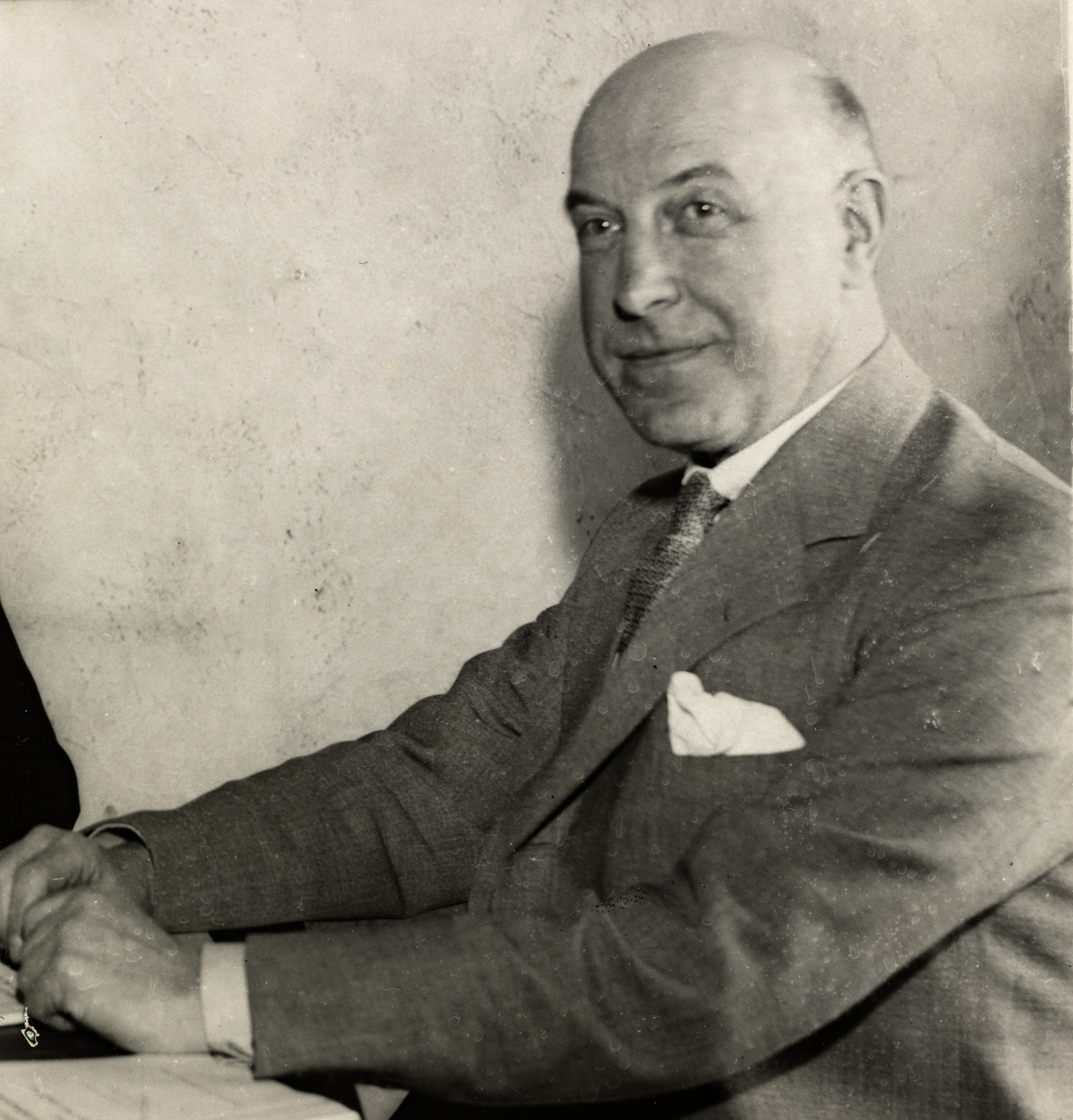
- Born: 10 December 1885; Kristiania
- Died: 7 December 1972 (aged 86)
- Education: University of Oslo
- Spouse: Helga Gjerløw
- Children: 2

Arne Kildal (10 December 1885 – 7 December 1972) was a Norwegian author, librarian and civil servant.

== Background ==
Arne Kildal was born in Kristiania (now Oslo, Norway). He finished his secondary education in 1903 and took his candidate degree from the University of Oslo before traveling to the United States to train as a librarian. He graduated with a Bachelor of Library Science from the New York State Library School at Albany in 1907 and worked in the country for three years, including at the Library of Congress.

== Career ==
In 1910 he returned to Norway to become chief librarian at Bergen Public Library. From 1920 to 1925 he served as the Norwegian press attaché in Washington, D.C. In 1925, he took over as secretary general of the Norse Federation (Nordmanns-Forbundet), a cultural association for Norwegian-Americans, and served from 1925 to 1955, only interrupted by World War II from 1941 to 1945. He was also employed by the Norwegian Ministry of Church and Education from 1937 to 1949. In 1949 he was appointed as the first director of the Norwegian Directorate of Public Libraries, serving until 1956. Kildal chaired the Norwegian Library Association from 1913 to 1916 and 1929 to 1933, and the Norwegian Encyclopedia (Statens folkeopplysningsråd) from 1933 to 1950.

== Personal life ==
Arne Kildal was the son of minister and Auditor General Birger Kildal (1849–1913) and Sofienlund Berger (1851–1940). In 1917 he married Helga Gjerløw (1886–1979), daughter of Professor Waldemar Christopher Brøgger (1851–1940).

== Selected works ==
- Selected list of Norwegian and Danish books recommended for a small public library (1908)
- Speeches and new letters [of] Henrik Ibsen Tr. by Arne Kildal (1910)
- The Norway Year Book 1931. Second Year of Issue (1930)
- American influence on European librarianship (1937)
- Press and Literature Front Under Occupation, 1940-1945 (1945)
- Survey of Library of Congress Scandinavian acquisitions for the period 1945-1952 (1953)

== Honours ==
Kildal was decorated with the Order of the Dannebrog and the Order of Saint Olav.

Civic offices
Preceded by position created	Director of the Norwegian Directorate of Public Libraries; 1949–1956	Succeeded by
