= Socialist Group (NATO Parliamentary Assembly) =

The Socialist Group is one of the parliamentary groups in the NATO Parliamentary Assembly (known as the North Atlantic Assembly until 1999). It consists of members of social democratic and democratic socialist parties from NATO member states, who are members of their countries' national parliaments, for example of members of the British Labour Party and the Social Democratic Party of Germany. It is one of the two main political groups in the assembly, along with the Group of Conservatives, Christian Democrats and Associates.

== Leaders ==
- José Lello
- Hans Hækkerup (1992–1993)
- Bert Koenders
- Marit Nybakk (2009–)
