= Johan Nordhagen =

Norwegian artist (1856–1956)

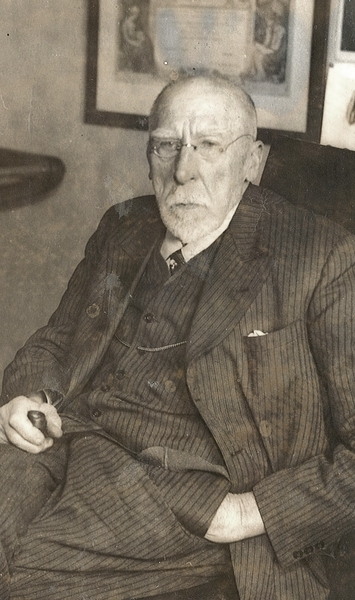
Johan Nordhagen, c. 1935

Johan Nordhagen (23 March 1856 – 28 August 1956) was a Norwegian painter, graphic artist, educator and school administrator.

== Childhood ==
Johan Nordhagen was born in Veldre in Ringsaker Municipality in Hedmark, Norway. He was the son of Ole Johansen (1816–73) and Ahlis Hansdatter Nordhagen (1830–91). He grew up in Nordhagen on a farm called Flisaker. His father was from Grue Municipality, and was of Finnish descent. He worked as a cartwheel-maker. His mother was from Veldre. He grew up in poverty. Nordhagen drew a lot in his childhood, and was often told to do something useful instead. It was just a coincidence that Nordhagen in his youth made contact with persons who helped him making a career in art. Around the age of 17 he came to Kristiania (now Oslo) and started working in the bookstore of the Luther Foundation (Lutherstiftelsen).

== Training ==
People noticed his talent for drawing, and it was arranged that he should study at the Royal School of Drawing with sculptors Julius Middelthun and Mathias Skeibrok. Later he was employed by the Norwegian Mapping and Cadastre Authority (then known as Norges Geografiske Oppmåling) as lithographer and terrain drawer. He won two scholarships, including the Houens legat in 1887, which enabled him to travel to study abroad, first to Copenhagen and then to Paris. In Norway there was no art printing expertise so a committee was established to work towards establishing a study of graphic art at the Arts and Crafts School (Kunst- og håndverksskolen). Nordhagen's background in lithographic portraits and etching, made him the obvious leader and teacher of this education. In 1897 he got a substantial grant from the Parliament of Norway to go to Germany from 1898–99 to train under Karl Köpping (1848-1914) at the Royal Academy of the Arts in Berlin.

== Career ==
On 1 October 1899 the class for etching at the Norwegian National Academy of Craft and Art Industry was established. Nordhagen was the school director for the next 20 years. In 1908, he was one of the co-founders of the Norwegian Association for Graphic Art.

Nordhagen is one of the few to have received the King's Medal of Merit (Kongens fortjenstmedalje) from two different kings. He received the first (in silver) from King Oscar II of Sweden in 1892, and (in gold) from King Haakon VII of Norway in 1929. He also received several medals and recognition from exhibitions around the World. In his later years he often visited Veldre, where he had a vacation house until 1937. Even after selling that, he often visited acquaintances in the community to make sketches and studies for later artistic work. Nordhagen had an enormous graphic production (lithography and etchings), but also drawings and paintings, his artistic and productive career spanned over 80 years.

== Personal life ==
In 1882, he married Christine Magdalene Brochmann Johansen (1858–1933). He was the father of botanist Rolf Nordhagen and architect Olaf Nordhagen as well as the grandfather of art historian Per Jonas Nordhagen. He died on 28 August 1956, 100 years old.

== Legacy ==
Many of Nordhagen's motifs were from Ringsaker and Veldrebygda including portraits of both famous and unknown persons, of local community originals, clothing, work situations, interiors and building customs. In 1988, the Veldre Historical Society (Veldre Historielag) published a richly illustrated book on the graphic artist Nordhagen in which the author describes the artist's adolescence and artistic life. The society has also over the years acquired quite a lot of etchings and one big painting from Nordhagen's substantial production. Some of Nordhagen's motifs have been also published as postcards.

== Other sources ==
- Odd Haakensveen (1988) Johan Nordhagen. Grafikerens liv og kunst (Veldre historielag) ISBN 82-99036-1-19
