= Standing Committee on Foreign Affairs =

Committee of the Norwegian Parliament from 1917 to 2009

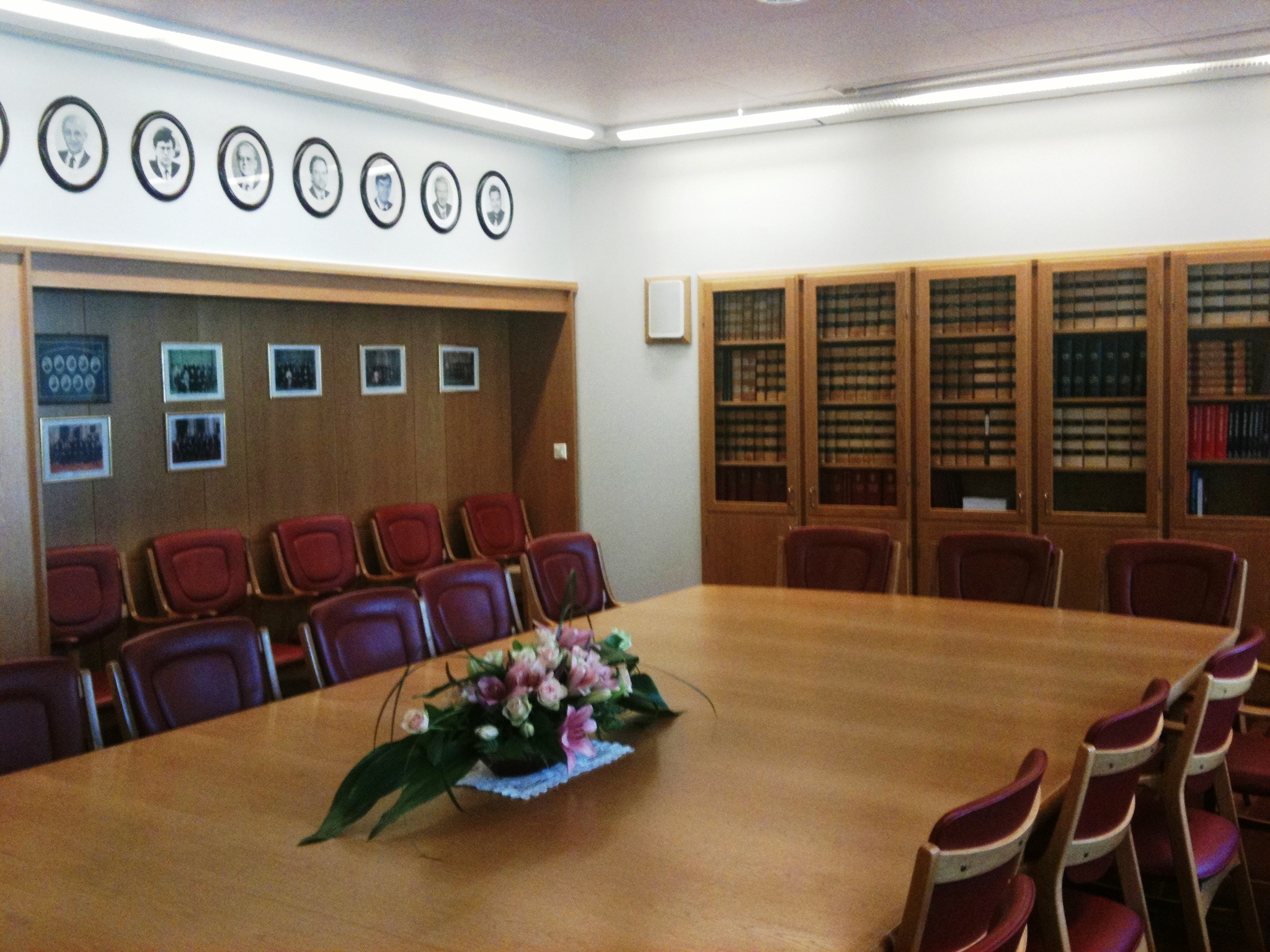
The committee room of the Standing committee on foreign affairs, Parliament of Norway (Stortinget)

Standing Committee on Foreign Affairs (Norwegian: Utenrikskomiteen) is a defunct committee of the Norwegian Parliament responsible for matters related to foreign policy, development assistance, international agreements, Svalbard and the Norwegian polar regions.

== Leaders ==
Leaders	Party	Period
J. L. Mowinckel	Liberal	1917–18
Ivar Peterson Tveiten	Liberal	1919–23
Arnold Holmboe	Liberal	1923-24
Nils Nilsson Skaar	Liberal	1924
C. J. Hambro	Conservative	1925–45
Terje Wold	Labour	1945–49
Finn Moe	Labour	1950–65
Bent Røiseland	Liberal	1965–70
Helge Seip	Liberal / Liberal People's	1970–73
Tor Oftedal	Arbeidepartiet	1973–77
Reiulf Steen	Labour	1977–79
Arvid Johanson	Labour	1979–80
Gro Harlem Brundtland	Arbeiderpartet	1980–81
Reiulf Steen	Labour	1981
Kåre Kristiansen	Christian Democrat	1981–83
Jakob Aano	Christian Democrat	1983–85
Jan Petersen	Conservative	1985–86
Kåre Willoch	Conservative	1986–89
Gro Harlem Brundtland	Labour	1989–90
Bjørn Tore Godal	Labour	1990–91
Gunnar Skaug	Labour	1991–93
Haakon Blankenborg	Labour	1993–2000
Thorbjørn Jagland	Labour	2000
Einar Steensnæs	Christian Democrat	2000–2001
Thorbjørn Jagland	Labour	2001–2005
Olav Akselsen	Labour	2005–

== Members 2005–09 ==
Member	Party	Remarks
Olav Akselsen	Labour	Leader
Erna Solberg	Conservative	Deputy leader
Marit Nybakk	Labour	Deputy leader
Hill-Marta Solberg	Labour	
Siv Jensen	Progress	
Finn Martin Vallersnes	Conservative	
Dagfinn Høybråten	Christian Democrat	
Øyvind Vaksdal	Progress	
Åslaug Haga	Centre	
Vidar Bjørnstad	Labour	
Ågot Valle	Socialist Left	
Anne Margrethe Larsen	Liberal	
Anette Trettebergstuen	Labour	
