= Olaf Nordhagen =

Norwegian educator, architect, engineer and artist (1883–1925)

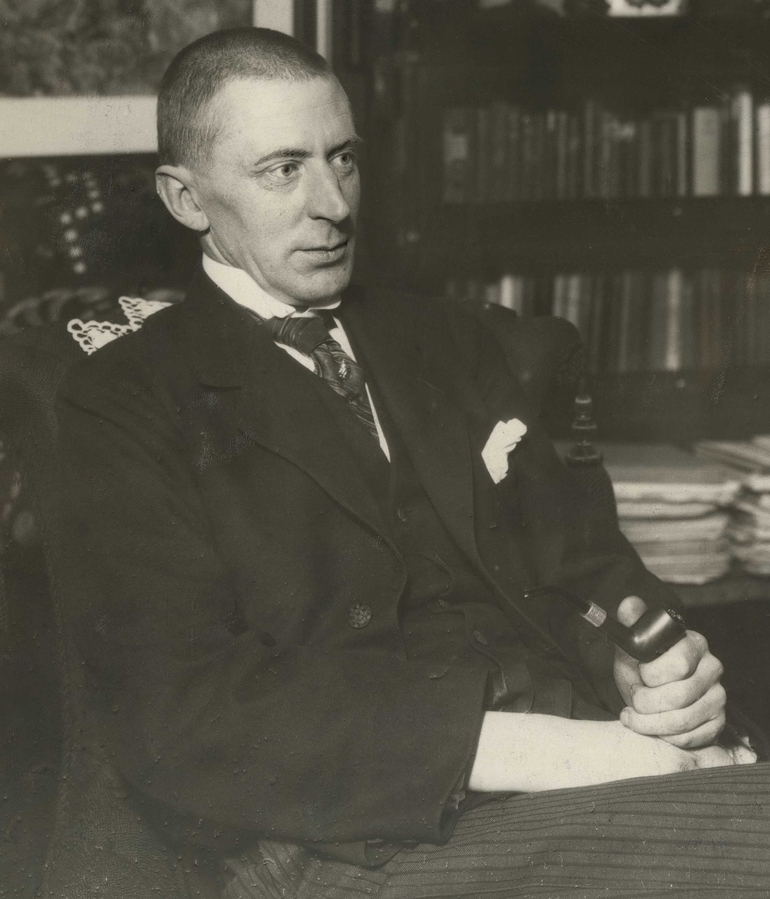
Olaf Nordhagen

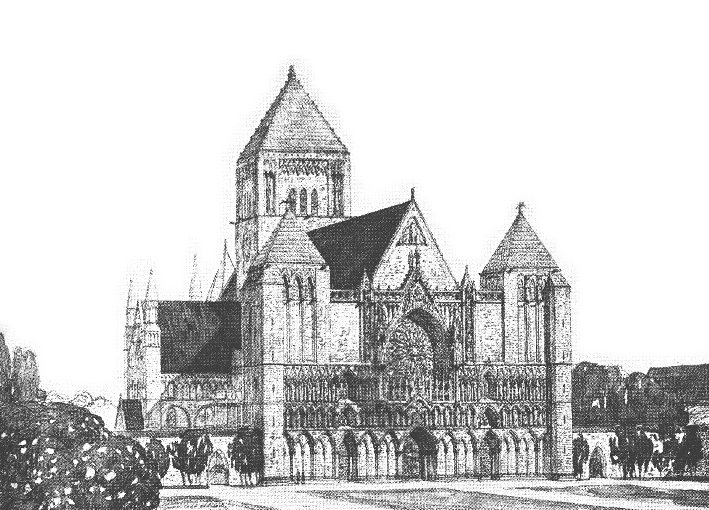
Plan for restoration of Nidaros Cathedral, drawn by Olaf Nordhagen (1914)

Johan Olaf Brochmann Nordhagen (16 March 1883 – 6 November 1925) was a Norwegian educator, architect, engineer and artist. He is most commonly associated with his restoration designs for Nidaros Cathedral in Trondheim, Norway.

== Biography ==
Olaf Nordhagen was born in Christiania (now Oslo), Norway. He was a son of painter and artist Johan Nordhagen (1856–1956) and Christine Magdalene Brochmann Johansen (1858–1933). He was a brother of botanist Rolf Nordhagen and through him an uncle of art historian Per Jonas Nordhagen. In April 1909 in Ådal Municipality, he married Thora Hval (1887–1960).

Nordhagen was educated as an engineer at Christiania tekniske skole in Oslo and worked as an apprentice to architect Bredo Greve for several years before studying at the Royal Danish Academy of Art while also assisting Martin Nyrop with his designs for Copenhagen City Hall. Nordhagen returned to Oslo in 1906 and accepted a number of smaller commissions. His breakthrough, however, came when he won the competition to build the Bergen Public Library (Bergen Offentlige Bibliotek) in Art Nouveau (Jugendstil), for which he also won the Houen Fund prize (Houens fonds premie).

Nordhagen designed a number of industrial structures including transformer stations and power plants, including Såheim Hydroelectric Power Station in Rjukan (with Thorvald Astrup). He also designed several churches and completed considerable research around Norwegian traditional architecture. Dating from 1913, he was also a professor at the Norwegian Institute of Technology in Trondheim.

Following the death in 1906 of architect Christian Christie, Nordhagen took over the restoration designs of the Nidaros Cathedral, which he continued until his own death in 1925. His tendency to reinterpret Gothic designs rather than seek a faithful reproduction of the original was controversial at the time but was carried out.

== Notable projects ==
- Såheim power station - Tinn Municipality (1911)
- Vemork power station - Tinn Municipality (1911)
- Årlifoss power station - Notodden Municipality (1915)
- Glomfjord power station - Meløy Municipality (1920)
- Follafoss power station- Verran Municipality (1923)

== Gallery ==
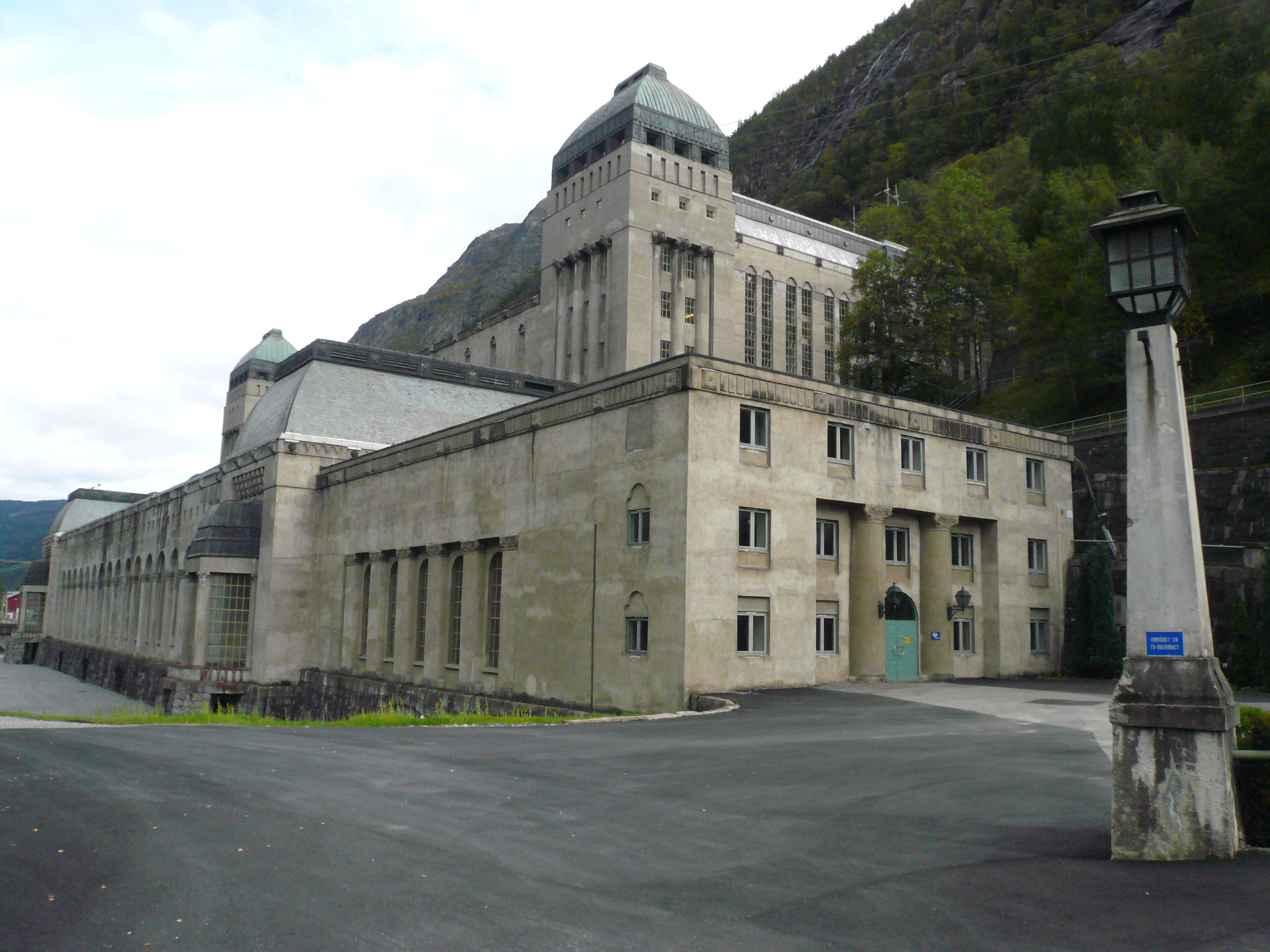
Såheim power plant

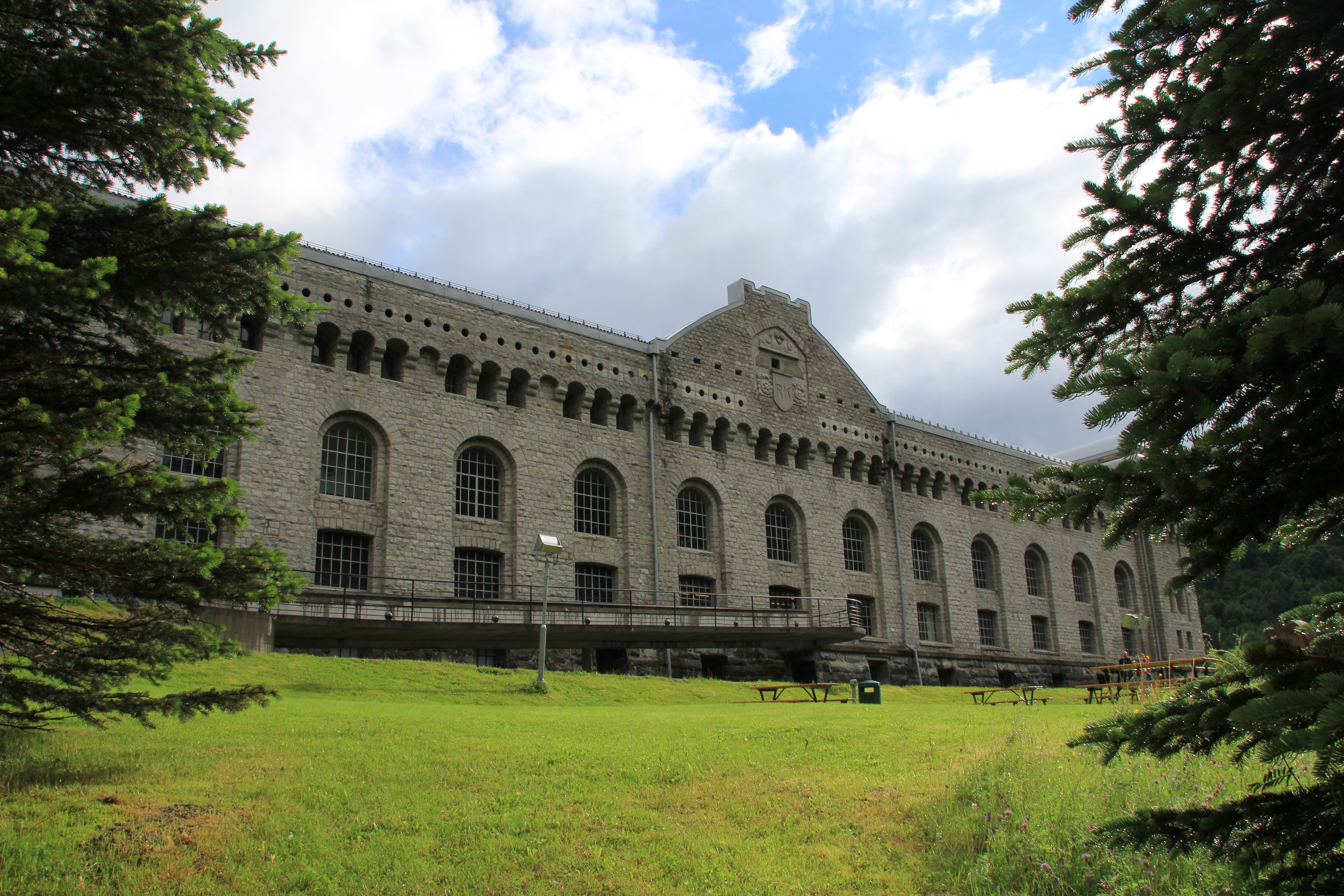
Vemork power station

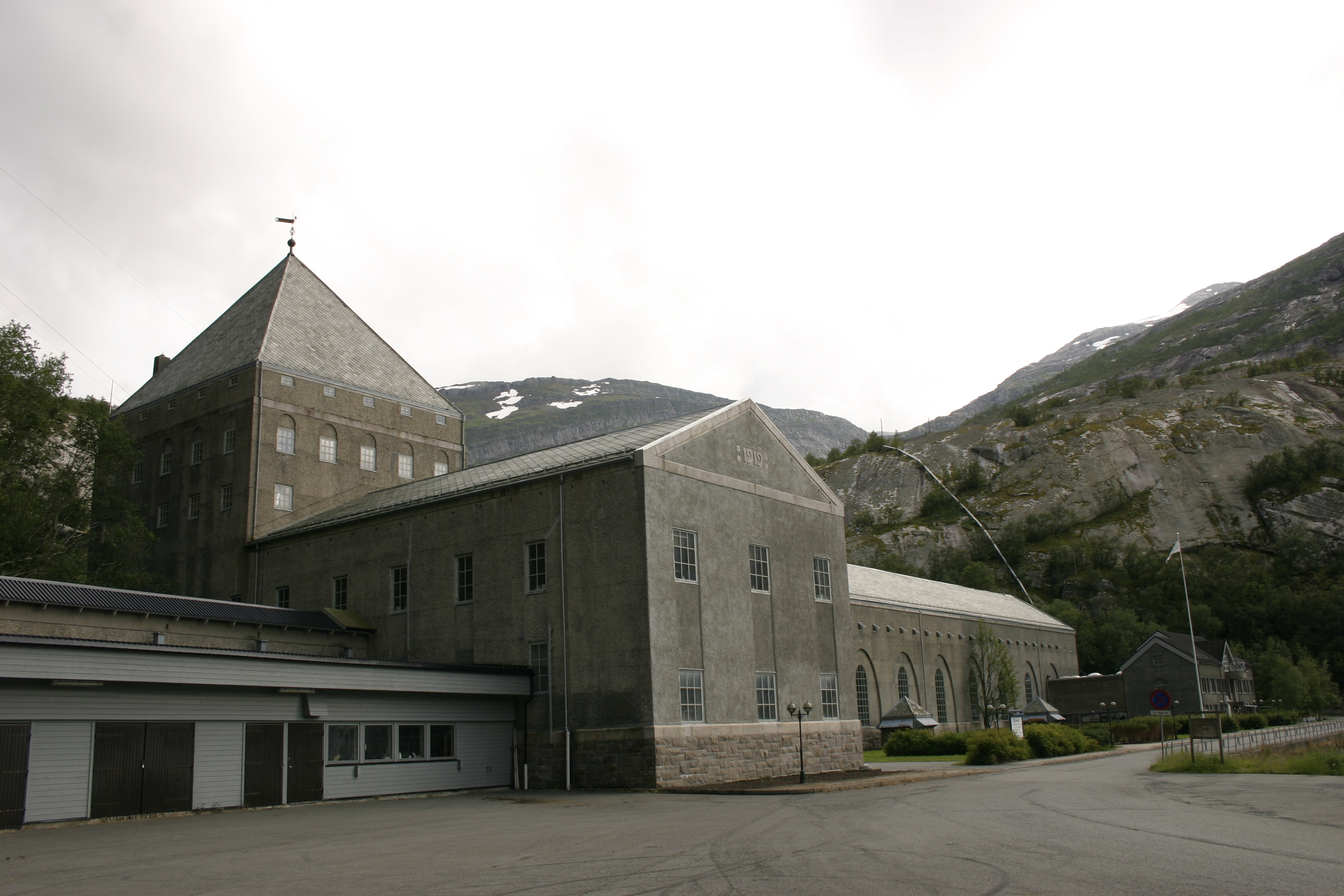
Glomfjord power plant

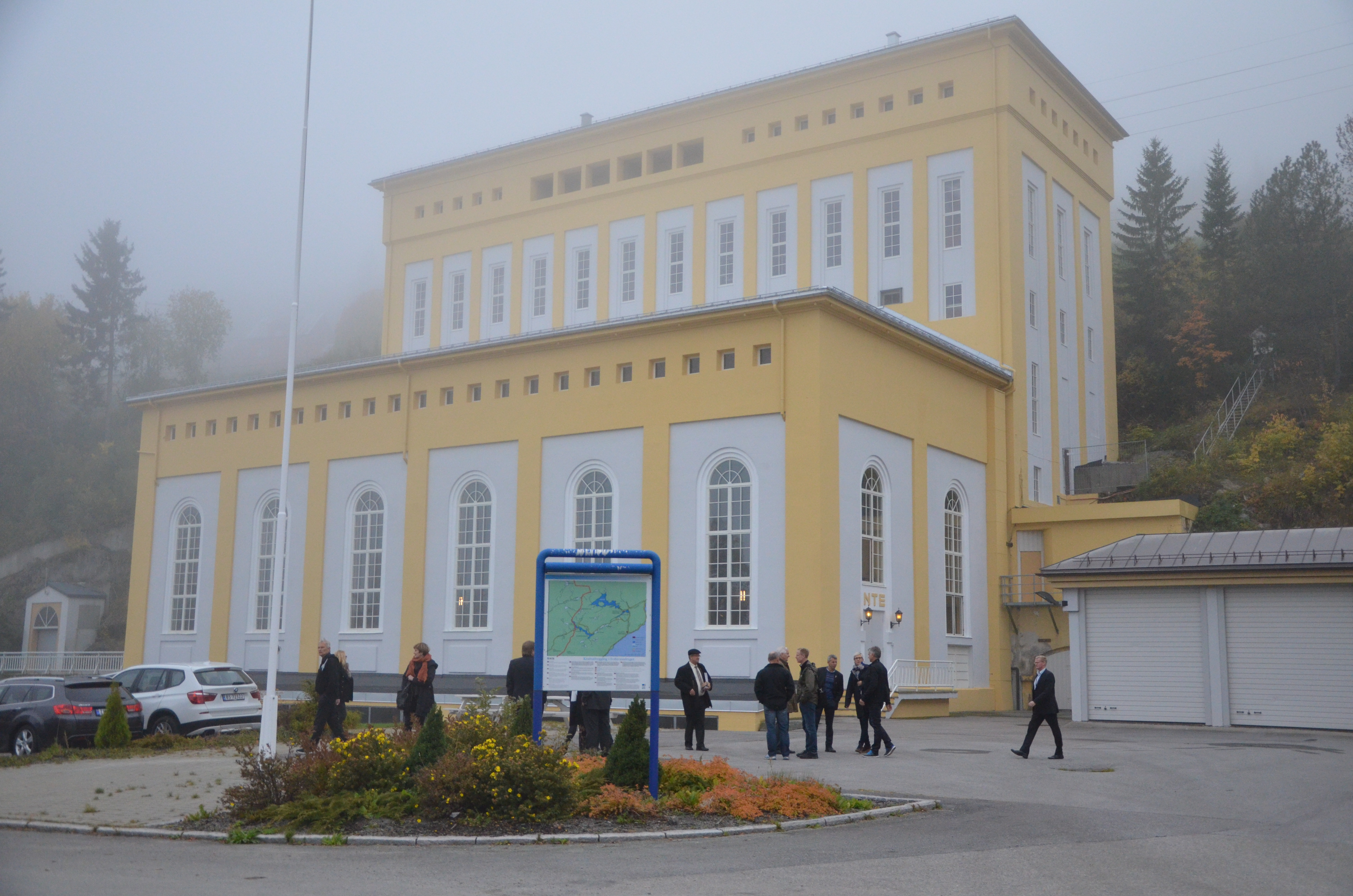
Follafoss power plant
