= Rolf Nordhagen (physicist) =

Norwegian physicist and computer scientist

Rolf Nordhagen (2 August 1927 – 1 July 2013) was a Norwegian physicist and computer scientist.

== Early life and education ==
Rolf was born in Bergen, Norway. He was the son of the noted botanist, Rolf Nordhagen and the brother of art historian Per Jonas Nordhagen. He took his PhD in Liverpool in 1958, and was a docent in nuclear physics at the University of Oslo from 1970 to 1974. He changed to being the university's director of "EDB" (information technology) from 1974 to 1986 before being hired as a professor of informatics in 1986.

== Career ==
In 1995, he took over as head of the BALTNet project, where he contributed to the further expansion of the network, first to the Baltic states, then to Poland and the former Soviet republics. The first connection was via satellite from Oslo to Vilnius in 1991.

Nordhagen was involved in the development and reconstruction of both the Norwegian academic network UNINETT as well as the Nordic university network NORDUnet. Rolf Nordhagen was posthumously honored with admission into the Internet Hall of Fame in 2014.

== Other sources ==
- NORDUNET: The Roots of Nordic Networking by Rolf Nordhagen
