= Rolf Nordhagen (botanist) =

Norwegian botanist (1894–1979)

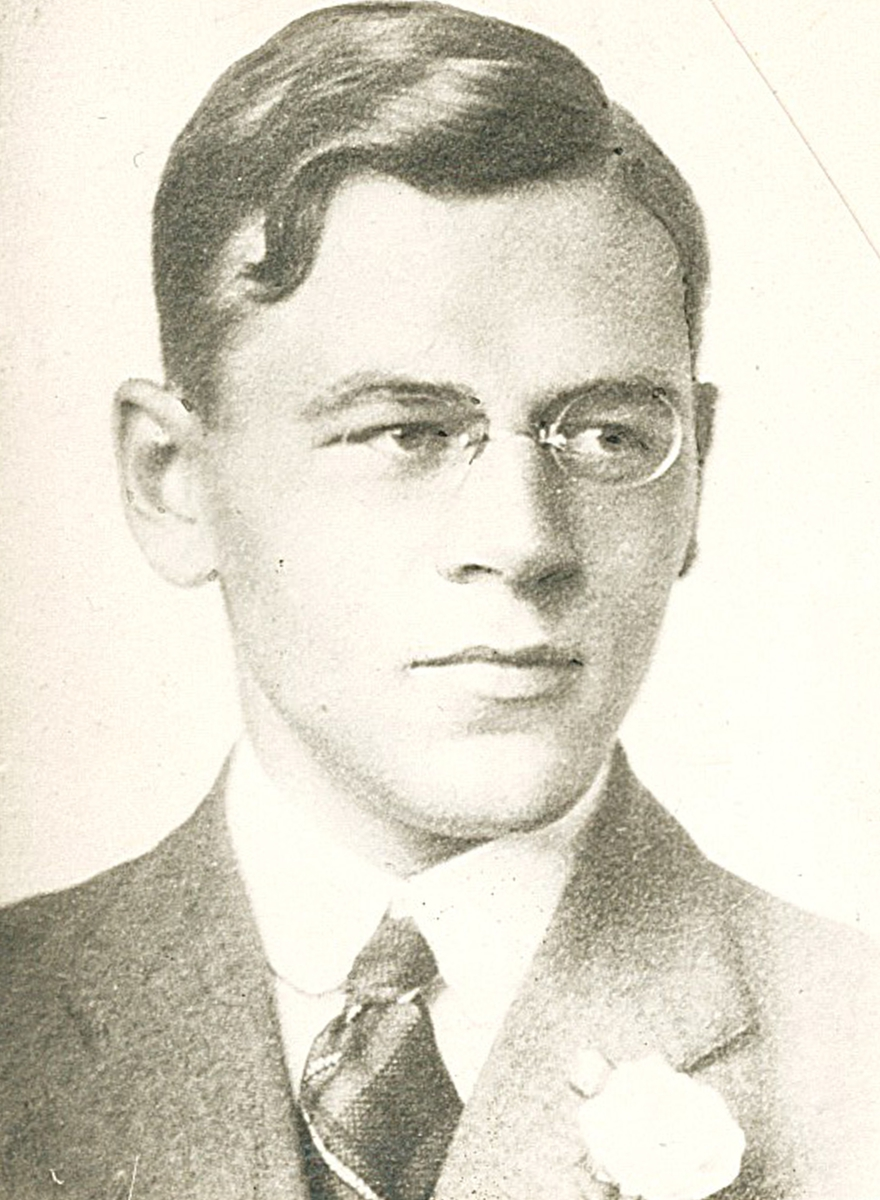
Norwegian professor of botany Rolf Nordhagen (1894–1979)

Rolf Nordhagen (21 October 1894 – 8 March 1979) was a Norwegian botanist. His greatest scientific efforts were in the area of plant sociology.

== Personal life ==
Rolf Nordhagen was born in Kristiania as a son of artist Johan Nordhagen (1856–1956) and Christine Magdalene, née Johansen (1858–1933). He was a brother of Olaf Nordhagen and Martha Gladtved-Prahl. In August 1925 in Oslo he married Elisabeth Marie Myhre (1900–1979). He was the father of art historian Per Jonas Nordhagen (born 1929) and computer scientist, Rolf Nordhagen (1927–2013).

== Career ==
He finished his secondary education at Kristiania Cathedral School in 1912 and took the cand.real. degree in 1918. He worked as an assistant in the Botanical Garden in Kristiania from 1915 to 1920, was a research fellow at the Royal Frederick University from 1920 to 1925 and took the dr.philos. degree in 1922 on the thesis Kalktufstudier i Gudbrandsdalen, about limestone tuff. He was a teacher at the Norwegian College of Agriculture from 1924 to 1925, professor at Bergen Museum from 1925 to 1945 and professor at the University of Oslo from 1946 to 1964. He was the manager of the Botanical Garden in Bergen, and the Botanical Garden and Museum in Oslo.

His professional fields were phytomorphology, phytosociology and phytogeography. He was also known to draw from humanist subjects such as philology, ethnology and history. His first work was Die Vegetation und Flora des Sylenegebietes, about the mountain flora of the Sylane range, released by the Norwegian Academy of Science and Letters in 1927–1928. Versuch einer neuen Einteilung der subalpinen-alpinen Vegetation Norwegens came in 1936. His main work was Sikkilsdalen og Norges fjellbeiter (Sikkilsdalen and Norway's mountain pastures). En plantesosiologisk monografi, released in 1943. More popular releases were the text volume of Norsk flora in 1940 and Våre ville planter. The latter book was released in eight volumes between 1950 and 1958 in which he contributed with four other authors: Torstein Lagerberg, Jens Holmboe, Einar Du Rietz and John Axel Nannfeldt.

Nordhagen was a member of the Norwegian Academy of Science and Letters from 1923, of the Royal Norwegian Society of Sciences and Letters from 1952, and of academies in København, Helsinki, Uppsala, Stockholm, Gothenburg and Lund. He was awarded the Fridtjof Nansen Prize in 1947, an honorary degree at Uppsala University in 1957 and Knighthood of the Order of St. Olav in 1957. He died in March 1979 in Oslo.
