= C. J. Hambro =

Norwegian politician (1885–1964)

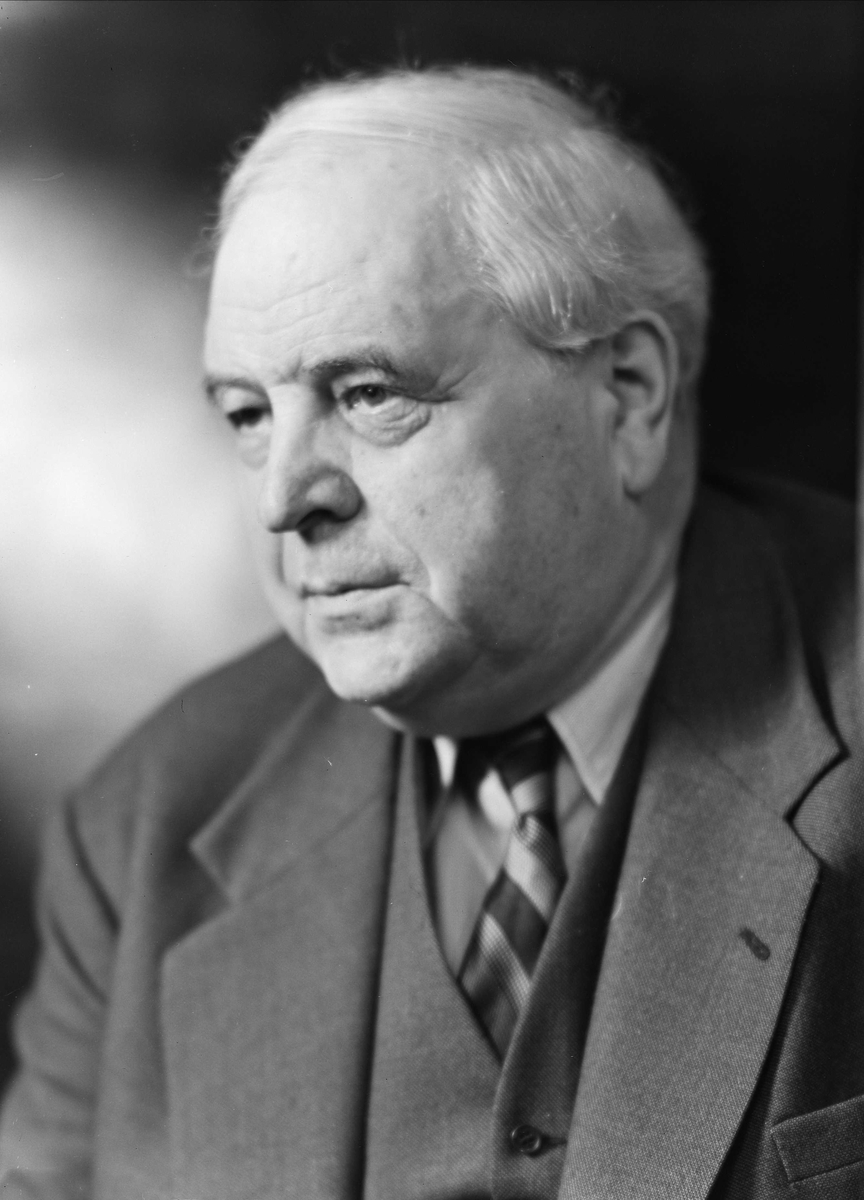
- Hambro in 1950

President of the Storting
- In office 21 March 1935 – 3 December 1945
- Prime Minister: Johan Nygaardsvold; Einar Gerhardsen
- Vice President: Magnus Nilssen (1935–1940)
- Preceded by: Johan Nygaardsvold
- Succeeded by: Fredrik Monsen
- In office 30 June 1926 – 10 January 1934
- Prime Minister: Ivar Lykke; Christopher Hornsrud; Johan Ludwig Mowinckel; Peder Kolstad; Jens Hundseid
- Vice President: Christopher Hornsrud (1928–1934)
- Preceded by: Otto B. Halvorsen
- Succeeded by: Johan Nygaardsvold

Vice President of the Storting
- In office 11 January 1934 – 21 March 1935
- President: Johan Nygaardsvold
- Preceded by: Christopher Hornsrud
- Succeeded by: Magnus Nilssen

Member of the Norwegian Parliament
- In office 1 January 1922 – 31 December 1957
- Constituency: Oslo
- In office 1 January 1919 – 31 December 1921
- Constituency: Kristiania

Leader of the Conservative Party
- In office 1926–1934
- Preceded by: Ivar Lykke
- Succeeded by: Johan H. Andresen
- In office 1950–1954
- Preceded by: Arthur Nordlie
- Succeeded by: Alv Kjøs

President of the Odelsting
- In office 10 December 1945 – 10 January 1958
- Vice President: Olav Oksvik; Peder Leier Jacobsen
- Preceded by: Gunnuf Eiesland
- Succeeded by: Alv Kjøs

Personal details
- Born: 5 January 1885 Bergen, Hordaland, United Kingdoms of Sweden and Norway
- Died: 15 December 1964 (aged 79) Oslo, Norway
- Party: Conservative
- Spouse(s): Gudrun Greig (1910–1943, her death); Gyda Christensen (1946–1964, her death)
- Children: 3
- Occupation: Journalist, author and politician

Carl Joachim Hambro (5 January 1885 – 15 December 1964) was a Norwegian journalist, author and leading politician representing the Conservative Party. A ten-term member of the Parliament of Norway, Hambro served as President of the Parliament for 20 of his 38 years in the legislature. He was actively engaged in international affairs, including work with the League of Nations (1939–1940), delegate to the UN General Assembly (1945–1956) and member of the Norwegian Nobel Committee (1940–1963).

== Personal life ==
Carl Joachim Hambro's lineage can be traced back to Rendsburg in the 1720s. The family was Jewish. The family member Calmer Joachim Hambro (1747–1806) relocated to Copenhagen in the late 18th century, and became a businessman. One of his sons, Joseph Hambro, moved on to London and founded Hambros Bank with his son Carl Joachim Hambro. Another son (and Joseph's brother) Edvard Isaach Hambro (1782–1865) moved to Bergen, Norway where he became a merchant in the early 19th century. Edvard Isaach Hambro fathered Carl Joachim Hambro (1813–1873), who in turn fathered the school manager Edvard Isak Hambro (1847–1909).

Hambro was born in Bergen to Edvard Isak Hambro and Nicoline Christine Harbitz (1861–1926, later known as Nico Hambro). He had three sisters, among them the educator Elise Hambro. He was a distant descendant of Johan Randulf Bull, and thereby a first cousin of Edvard Bull, Sr., Johan Peter Bull and Francis Bull.

From June 1910, Hambro was married to Gudrun "Dudu" Grieg (1881–1943), daughter of a priest. They had sons Edvard Hambro, Vilhelm Cato Grieg Hambro, Carl Joachim Hambro and Johan Randulf Bull Hambro and one daughter; all born between 1911 and 1915. Through Edvard, he was also grandfather to Christian Hambro. Three years after his wife died, in February 1946, Hambro married actress Gyda Christensen (1872–1964) whom he had befriended in 1918.

== Early career ==
Hambro attended the middle school and high school his father had founded in Bergen. He took the examen artium in 1902, and enrolled in philology studies at the Royal Frederick University. While studying, he took many excursions, working as translator, literary critic, part-time teacher and even participant on the research vessel Michael Sars. He was also a journalist in Morgenbladet, from 1903 to 1907. He finally received his cand.mag. degree in 1907.

He was involved in the Norwegian Students' Society, which he chaired in 1908, 1909 and in the autumn of 1911. He chaired the Conservative Students' Association in 1908, 1910 and 1911, and was also vice chairman of Filologisk Forening in 1904. From 1910 to 1913 he was the secretary of the Norse Federation, and edited its periodical from 1911 to 1916. He was also involved in association football, chairing the club Akademisk FK and being vice chairman (in 1904) of the fledgling Football Association of Norway.

After graduating from the university, he was a teacher at Kristiania Commerce School (1907) and Vestheim School (1908–1912). In 1913 he became chief editor of the conservative newspaper Morgenbladet, a post he held until 1919. He then focused on pursuing a political career, having been elected in the autumn of 1918. He returned to the press as editor of the magazine Ukens Revy from 1921 to 1929.

Ukens Revy had been distinctively pro-German and anti-British during the First World War. During the war, Hambro got entangled in British affairs. In January 1917, the United Kingdom had ceased its coal exports to Norway. During the negotiations between Knudsen's Cabinet's representatives and the British legation in Kristiania, Hambro wrote an editorial in Morgenbladet which suggested expulsion of the British diplomats if Norwegian needs were not met. British Foreign Secretary Arthur Balfour met with the Norwegian ambassador in the UK, and demanded that Knudsen's Cabinet either deplore Morgenbladet's statements or prosecute Hambro legally. Hambro's actions were defended by the Norwegian parliamentary opposition, including the Conservative Party. After some rounds of talks and negotiations, the whole case blew over. In the first phase of the First World War, Hambro had campaigned restlessly against Knudsen's Cabinet which he perceived as too weak to lead the country through a war. Hambro and Morgenbladet was joined in this endeavor by Tidens Tegn and to an extent Aftenposten. Prime Minister Gunnar Knudsen summoned a sitdown of himself and the three newspaper's editors, where he tried to calm their attacks. "The attempt failed completely", notes historian Hans Fredrik Dahl.

Hambro also marked himself as a critic of socialism. He reacted strongly against the antimilitaristic policies of the socialists in Norway, and called for reactions against those who spread such "contamination" in print. In 1918, in the wake of the Russian Revolution, Hambro suggested that the revolutionary socialist press be met with harsher regulations. He wrote in Morgenbladet: "Perhaps our authorities should be more attentive towards the socially subversive agitation long practiced by our socialist leaders in writing and speech". On the other hand, he also criticized cases of actual censorship directed towards the workers' movement, among others during the secret military expedition to quell calamities in Rjukan in May 1914.

He chaired the boards of the Conservative Press Association from 1913 to 1920, Ukens Revy from 1919 to 1929, the Norwegian News Agency from 1920 to 1946 (vice chairman 1918 to 1920), and the Norse Federation from 1923 to 1946 (board member 1913 to 1915, vice chairman 1915 to 1923). He was the vice chairman of Det Nye Teater from 1928 to 1932, a board member of Morgenbladet from 1921 to 1933 as well as of the Institute for Comparative Research in Human Culture. He was a supervisory council member of Nationaltheatret.

== Political career ==
Hambro had settled in Kristiania (Oslo), and in 1908 he became a board member of the Conservative Party there. He was selected as a member of Kristiania's school board in 1913. In 1921 he advanced to chairman, a post he held until 1923.

In the 1918 Norwegian parliamentary election he stood on the Conservative Party ballot in Uranienborg and was elected to the Parliament of Norway in that single-member constituency. He was nominated as the party's candidate in Uranienborg as a compromise candidate between the agrarian-conservative wing of Jens Bratlie and the liberal wing of Fredrik Stang, Nils Yngvar Ustvedt and Edvard Hagerup Bull (Bratlie, Stang and Ustvedt were former MPs from Uranienborg). Hambro received 14,501 votes, and thus won a landslide victory. The closest runner-up was G. E. Stubberød of Labour, who tallied only 1,504 votes.

After the change to plural-member constituencies Hambro was re-elected to Parliament from the constituency Kristiania in 1921, and, after it changed its name to Oslo, in 1924, 1927, 1930, 1933, 1936, 1945, 1949 and 1953. He was a member of Parliament from 1919 to 1957; amounting to ten consecutive terms in total (the 1940 election was called off because of World War II).

Hambro served as President of the Parliament from 30 June 1926 to 10 January 1934 and from 21 March 1935 to 3 December 1945, and President of the Assembly of the League of Nations delegates in 1939–40 and 1946. He had originally voted against Norway's accession to the League of Nations, as one of only three representatives from his party to do so, citing that the Versailles Treaty did not create decent grounds for such an international organization. He chaired the Standing Committee on Foreign and Constitutional Affairs from 1925 to 1945, and was then a member from 1945 to 1957. From 1945 to 1957 he was also a member of the Enlarged Committee on Foreign and Constitutional Affairs. In the Election Committee of the Parliament, he was the chairman from 1928 to 1945 and deputy chairman from 1945 to 1957.

Hambro served as acting party chairman in 1926, and party chairman from 1928 to 1934 and 1945 to 1954. He was also a central board member from 1934 to 1964. He was never a member of any government, despite that his party formed several cabinet during his parliamentary tenure. He instead chose to work as chairman of his party as well as its parliamentary group; the two posts had actually become open to him when Ivar Lykke chose to form his cabinet in 1926.

As president of the Odelsting in 1956, Hambro spoke out against the repeal of the Jesuit clause, which had banned them from the country since 1814:

It must be remembered that neither Nazism in Germany, Fascism in Italy, Rexism in Belgium led by Degrelle, the Catholics' favorite disciple, Petain's movement in France, Franco's movement in Spain would have been possible without the support and active collaboration of the Jesuits. Those who have retained any impression of Hitler's Mein Kampf will also have a strong impression of how much he had learned from Jesuitism, and how highly he valued its organization and its teachings. There are few things he has expressed more directly.

— C. J. Hambro

=== Views ===
Hambro was known as a cosmopolite. He did not follow the group Fedrelandslaget, which was vying for conservative support, in their nationalism. In the so-called "Greenland Question", he arbitrated with Denmark in 1923–1924 when Denmark claimed sovereignty over Greenland, and had meant that Denmark acted unjustified. However, when forces in and outside of the then-Agrarian government annexed "Erik the Red's Land" in 1931, Hambro was strictly against it. The Agrarian Party revenged itself on Hambro by voting him down as President of the Parliament in 1934, but Hambro won support from the adversaries in the Labour Party to regain the post. He nurtured a personal friendship with figures such as the Labour Party's foremost politician, Johan Nygaardsvold.

Despite his family's Jewish roots, Hambro was a Christian. He more or less adhered to the views of the Oxford Group, without being an actual member of this group. He famously invited the Oxford Group's founder, Frank Buchman, and a large party of Oxford Group members to Norway in 1934 where they led a massive campaign for "a Christian revolution" leading to a kind of "national awakening" credited with strengthening Norwegian spirit of resistance during World War II.

=== Role in World War II ===
Hambro played a crucial role at the time of the German invasion of Norway on 9 April 1940. He was one of the few politicians who really understood Hitler's ambitions toward the country. Learning from what had happened to Czechoslovakia in 1938, Hambro was prepared, and with only six hours advance notice, he managed to organize the escape of King Haakon and his royal family, the government, prominent members of Parliament and the gold reserves of the Bank of Norway. They all left on a train commissioned by Hambro just 30 minutes before the Germans arrived in Oslo. The Germans had then been delayed by the sinking of the German cruiser Blücher.

In the days after the invasion, Hambro worked actively from Sweden's capital Stockholm to correct the image the American journalist Leland Stowe had portrayed of the situation in Norway. While in Sweden, Hambro also was instrumental in organizing the fledgling Norwegian underground resistance movement via telephone.

=== Post-war life ===
After the Second World War, he was a delegate to the United Nations General Assembly from 1945 to 1956. He was a member of the Norwegian Nobel Committee from 1940 to 1963.

== Legacy ==
Hambro was a member of the Norwegian Academy for Language and Literature. His most prestigious awards were the Grand Cross of the Order of St. Olav in 1937 and the Medal for Outstanding Civic Service in 1952. He also got the Grand Cross of the Order of the White Rose of Finland, the Haakon VII 70th Anniversary Medal and the St. Olav's Medal. When he died in December 1964, he received a state funeral in the honorary section of Vår Frelsers gravlund.

He has a square in the centre of Oslo named after him, C. J. Hambros plass, in which are sited both the Oslo District Court and the National Authority for Investigation and Prosecution of Economic and Environmental Crime in Norway. Streets have been named after him in Heimdal and Fyllingsdalen (C. J. Hambros vei) as well as Elverum (C. J. Hambros veg).

A statue of him was erected in 1995 at the square in front of the Parliament, Eidsvolls plass.

== Selected works ==
- I saw it happen in Norway (1941)
- How to win the peace (1942)
- Crossroads of conflict: European peoples and problems (1943)
- Newspaper lords in British politics (1958)

== Bibliography ==
- Benkow, Jo; Willoch, Kåre (1985). C. J. Hambro 100 år (in Norwegian). Oslo: Conservative Party. OCLC 258411328.
- Gabrielsen, Trond (1967). C. J. Hambro som jeg kjente ham (in Norwegian). Oslo: Dreyer. OCLC 464531075.
- Hambro, Johan (1984). C.J. Hambro: Liv og drøm (in Norwegian). Oslo: Aschehoug. ISBN 82-03-11347-8.

Political offices
Preceded by Ivar Lykke	President of the Storting; 1925–1945 (His stand-in in Norway in 1940 was Ivar Lykke; Hambro was in exile 1940–1945)	Succeeded by Gustav Natvig-Pedersen; Fredrik Monsen
Preceded by Éamon de Valera	President of the League of Nations; 1939	Succeeded by N/A
Preceded by N/A	President of the League of Nations; 1946	Succeeded by none
Party political offices
Preceded by Ivar Lykke	Chairman of the Norwegian Conservative Party; 1926–1934	Succeeded by Johan H. Andresen
Preceded by Arthur Nordlie	Chairman of the Norwegian Conservative Party; 1950–1954	Succeeded by Alv Kjøs
Media offices
Preceded by Nils Vogt	Chief editor of Morgenbladet; 1913–1919	Succeeded by Olaf Gjærløw
