= Finn Jor =

Norwegian journalist and writer (born 1929)

Finn Bartol Horgen Jor (born 20 January 1929) is a Norwegian journalist and writer.

He was born in Kristiania as a son of Sverre A. Jor (1902–1962) and Ambjørg M. Horgen (1902–1970). He graduated from the University of Oslo in 1954 with a mag.art. degree in the history of ideas, with a thesis on Søren Kierkegaard, and was hired as a journalist in Morgenposten in 1955. He left in 1961 after a rather unsuccessful editorial attempt to emphasize cultural topics in the newspaper. After two years as a research fellow in NAVF he worked at a university college in Århus. He was hired in Aftenposten in 1964, and eventually became debate editor and cultural editor. He retired in 1992. He has continued releasing books with topics ranging from the history of ideas, culture policy and cultural history to poems, essay collections and novels. Jor has been a jury member of Nordic Council's Literature Prize, has chaired Norwegian Non-Fiction Writers Association and was a co-founder of Kopinor.

He was married to Louise Vislie from 1954 to 1969, and later to Finnish citizen Eeva-Liisa Sallinen. He chaired the Norwegian-Finnish Association from 1991 to 1992, and in 1995 he was decorated as a Knight, First Class of the Order of the Lion of Finland. He lives at Bekkestua.
