= Nicoline Hambro =

Norwegian politician and women's rights pioneer (1861–1926)

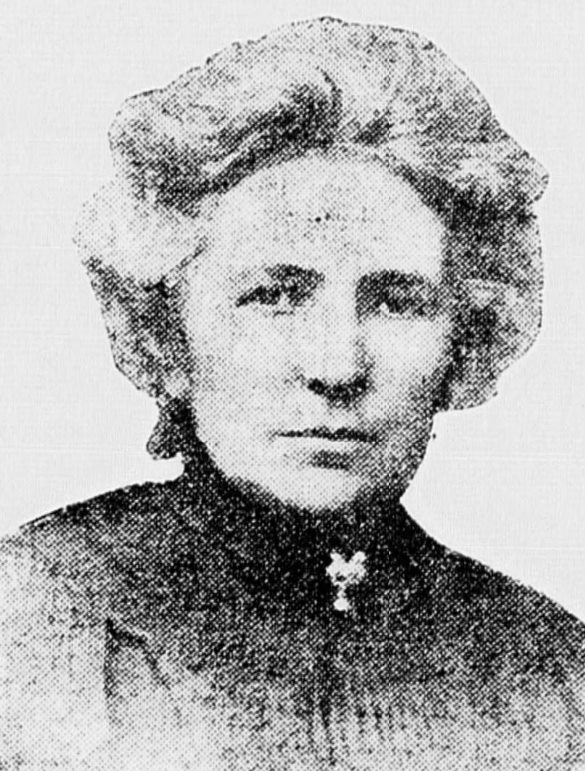
- Born: Nicoline Harbitz; 1 January 1861; Bergen, Norway
- Died: 9 May 1926 (aged 65)
- Known for: Pioneering proponent for women's rights
- Spouse: Edvard Isak Hambro
- Children: Elise Hambro; C. J. Hambro

Nicoline Christine Hambro (née Harbitz; 1 January 1861 – 9 May 1926) was a Norwegian politician and proponent for women's rights. She was born in Bergen; the daughter of Niels Andreas Harbitz and Elisabeth Christine Harbitz. She married educator Edvard Isak Hambro in 1880, and was the mother of politician C. J. Hambro and educator Elise Hambro. She took actively part in the administration of several contemporary political and social issues, such as welfare undertakings for female sailors and seamstresses, female police, homes for prostitutes, and pauperism. She was also a member of the Bergen City Council. She served as president of the Norwegian National Women's Council from 1916 to 1922. In 1919 she translated a collection of the adventurous stories about Baron Munchausen into Norwegian language.
