= Per Jonas Nordhagen =

Norwegian art historian (born 1929)

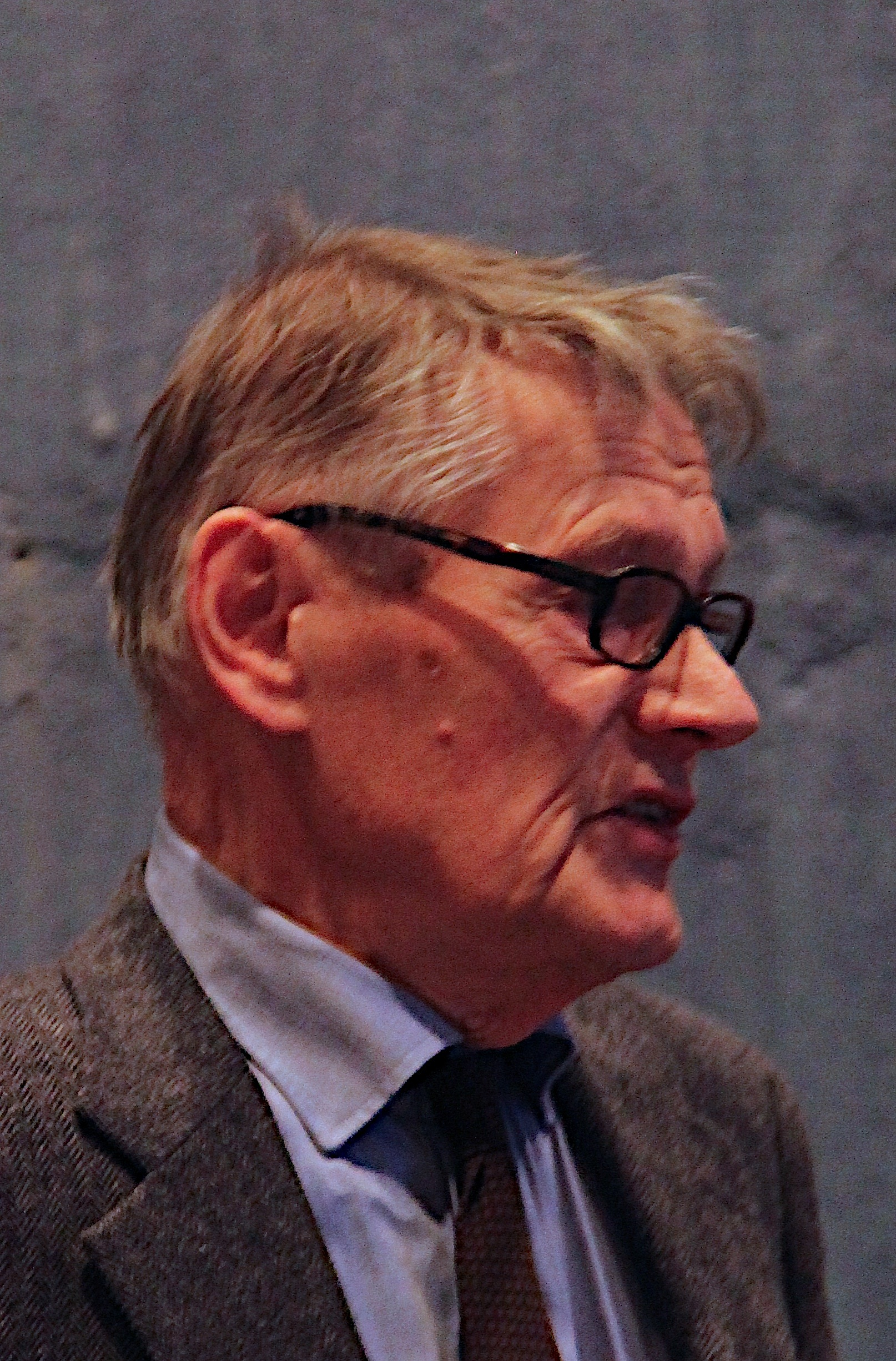
Per Jonas Nordhagen, 2009.

Per Jonas Nordhagen (30 October 1929 – 24 May 2025) was a Norwegian art historian.

He was born in Bergen as a son of professor Rolf Nordhagen (1894–1979) and Elisabeth Marie Myhre (1900–1979). He was a grandson of Johan Nordhagen and nephew of Olaf Nordhagen. He has been married twice; first to art historian Signe Horn Fuglesang, a daughter of Rolf Jørgen Fuglesang.

He finished his secondary education in 1948 and took the mag.art. degree (PhD equivalent) at the University of Oslo in 1955. He was a lecturer at the University of Oslo from 1962 to 1969, and after taking the dr.philos. degree in 1968 he became a docent at the University of Bergen from 1969 to 1973. He managed the University of Oslo's Norwegian Institute in Rome from 1973, succeeding his mentor Hans Peter L'Orange, before being a docent at the University of Oslo from 1976 to 1986 and a professor at the University of Bergen from 1986 to 1999. He was elected to the Norwegian Academy of Science and Letters in 1974.

His special field was Roma and Byzantine mosaics and frescos. He has also been involved in architecture and protection of buildings, among others in the Society for the Preservation of Ancient Norwegian Monuments. In 1994 he became deputy chairman of the National Gallery of Norway. He died in May 2025, aged 95.
