= Tor Saglie =

Norwegian civil servant (born 1949)

Tor Saglie (born 13 September 1949) is a Norwegian civil servant. He was educated at the University of Oslo, graduating in 1976 with a cand.polit. degree in political science. He was the director (head of administration) of the University of Oslo from 1991 to 2003 and permanent under-secretary of state (departementsråd) in the Ministry of Local Government and Regional Development from 2003 to 2006. In 2006, he was appointed the first Labour and Welfare Director, i.e. the head of the Labour and Welfare Service and the Labour and Welfare Administration. He left in the summer of 2011. In April 2012 he was appointed as permanent under-secretary of state in the Ministry of Justice and the Police.

He is married to former cabinet minister Tove Strand.

Civic offices
Preceded by position created	Labour and Welfare Director; 2006–2011	Succeeded by Joakim Lystad
Preceded by Morten Ruud	Permanent under-secretary of state in the Ministry of Justice and the Police; 2012–2018	Succeeded by Heidi Heggenes
