= Svein Kristensen =

Norwegian civil servant (born 1946)

Svein Ragnar Kristensen (born 22 January 1946) is a Norwegian civil servant.

Having graduated as siv.øk. from Norwegian School of Economics and Business Administration, he embarked on a career as a civil servant, working in the Ministry of Local Government (1973–1977), the Norwegian Labour Inspection Authority (1977–1984) and the National Insurance Administration (1985–1996). In 1996 he was hired as a sub-director in the Norwegian Tax Administration. Following the death of Tax Director Bjarne Johannes Hope, Kristensen became acting Tax Director on 1 July 2006; the appointment became permanent that December. In 2013 he was succeeded in this post by Hans Christian Holte.

Government offices
Preceded by Bjarne Johannes Hope	Director of the Norwegian Tax Administration; 2006–2013	Succeeded by Hans Christian Holte
