= Aetat =

Former Norwegian government agency

- Arbeidsmarkedsetaten
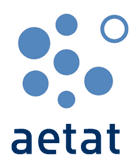

Agency overview
- Dissolved: 2006
- Superseding agency: Norwegian Labour and Welfare Administration

Aetat (short for Norwegian: Arbeidsmarkedsetaten, lit. 'the Labour Market Administration') was a Norwegian government agency responsible for battling unemployment.

== History ==
It had its roots in the Directorate of Labour (Norwegian: Arbeidsdirektoratet), which was founded in 1945. Its purpose was to "prevent and remedy" unemployment in the Norwegian society. The name Aetat was taken into use in 2000, when the directorate was reorganized. Aetat had eighteen county offices, several local offices, and other branches, whereas the directorate remained the core of the agency. The leader of the directorate was called the "director of labour" (Norwegian: arbeidsdirektør). The agency was subordinate to the Ministry of Government Administration.

== Successor ==
In 2005 the Parliament of Norway agreed to abolish Aetat as well as the National Insurance Service, with effect from 2006. A new organization was created in their place, the Norwegian Labour and Welfare Administration (Norwegian: Arbeids- og velferdsforvaltningen, NAV) which consists of the state-run Norwegian Labour and Welfare Service (Norwegian: Arbeids- og velferdsetaten) and certain parts of the municipal social services, and has a broader responsibility for welfare. The reform that created NAV is not completed yet.
