= Tom Veierød =

Norwegian civil servant (born 1937)

Tom Veierød (born 6 September 1937) is a Norwegian civil servant.

He was born in Gran Municipality, and is a cand.philol. by education. He worked as chief administrative officer in Harstad Municipality from 1985 to 1990, as permanent under-secretary of state in the Ministry of Church, Education and Research from 1990 to 1992, as CEO of Statskonsult from 1992 to 1995, and general director of the Norwegian Association of Local and Regional Authorities from 1995 to 2001.

He is married to Tove Veierød.

Preceded by Christian Hambro	Director of Statskonsult; 1992–1995	Succeeded by Åge Danielsen
Preceded by Søren Gunnar Torsdal	Director of the Norwegian Association of Local and Regional Authorities; 1995–2002	Succeeded by Olav Ulleren
