= Hans Christian Holte =

Norwegian civil servant (born 1965)

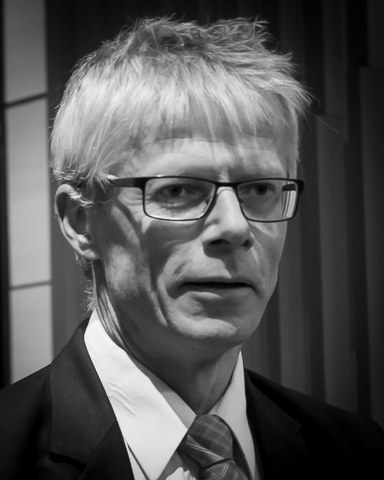
Holte in 2016

Hans Christian Holte (born 11 March 1965) is a Norwegian civil servant. He most recently served as the Labour and Welfare Director from 2020 until his firing in 2025.

Having graduated as cand.polit. in political science from the University of Oslo in 1992, he became head of department in the Norwegian Directorate for Health and Social Affairs in 2002 and deputy under-secretary of state in the Ministry of Education and Research. He also served as assisting permanent under-secretary of state. From 2008 to 2013 he was the director of the Agency for Public Management and eGovernment. From 2013 until 2020, he was the Director of the Norwegian Tax Administration and was succeeded by Nina Schanke Funnemark. That same year he was nominated as Labour and Welfare Director and assumed office on 1 August.

Following his firing as Labour and Welfare Director in November 2025, Holte joined the Norwegian Digitalisation Agrncy as an advisor.

Government offices
New office	Director of the Agency for Public Management and eGovernment; 2008–2013	Succeeded by Ingelin Killengreen
Preceded by Svein Kristensen	Director of the Norwegian Tax Administration; 2013–2020	Succeeded by Nina Schanke Funnemark
Preceded by Sigrun Vågeng	Labour and Welfare Director; 2020–2025	Succeeded by TBD
