= Agency for Public Management and eGovernment =

Norwegian government agency

- Direktoratet for forvaltning og ikt (Difi)
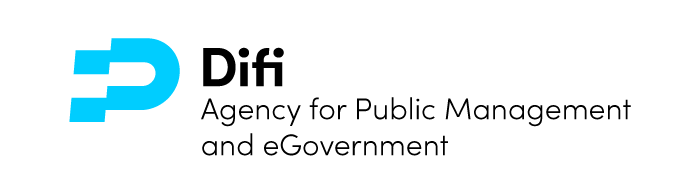

Agency overview
- Formed: 1 January 2008
- Preceding agencies: Statskonsult; E-handelssekretariatet; Norge.no
- Dissolved: 1 January 2020
- Superseding agency: Norwegian Digitalisation Agency
- Jurisdiction: Government of Norway
- Headquarters: Oslo
- Agency executive: Steffen Sutorius
- Parent agency: Norwegian Ministry of Government Administration and Reform

The Agency for Public Management and eGovernment (Norwegian: Direktoratet for forvaltning og ikt) or Difi was a government agency subordinate to the Norwegian Ministry of Government Administration and Reform. The agency was made defunct on 31 December 2019, and its functions merged into the new Norwegian Digitalization Agency which was established on 1 January 2020.

== Responsibilities ==
It was responsible for help the public sector achieve quality, efficiency, user friendliness, openness, and participation, as well as helping the public sector be organized. It led in a good way with good intersectoral cooperation. It provided management consulting for the public sector and operated several websites on behalf of the Government.

== History ==
The agency was created on 1 January 2008, and was based in Oslo and Leikanger. It was created after a merger of Statskonsult, the Norwegian eProcurement Secretariat, and Norge.no.

The first director was Hans Christian Holte. He left the position in the summer of 2013 to become director of the Norwegian Tax Administration. Utheim, Midtsjø (30 October 2013) Ingelin Killengreen was hired as interim director with start December 2013.
