= Willy Ovesen =

Norwegian civil servant (1924–2015)

Willy Ovesen (1 June 1924 – 3 January 2015) was a Norwegian civil servant.

He was born in Sørreisa Municipality, graduated with the cand.jur. degree and worked in the Norwegian Tax Administration from 1956. He was promoted to county tax director in Akershus county in 1973, and served as director of the Norwegian Tax Administration (Tax Director) from 1982 to 1994. He died in 2015.

Government offices
Preceded by Erling Ree-Pedersen	Director of the Norwegian Tax Administration; 1982–1994	Succeeded by Bjarne Johannes Hope
