= Kristin Krohn Devold =

Norwegian politician (born 1961)

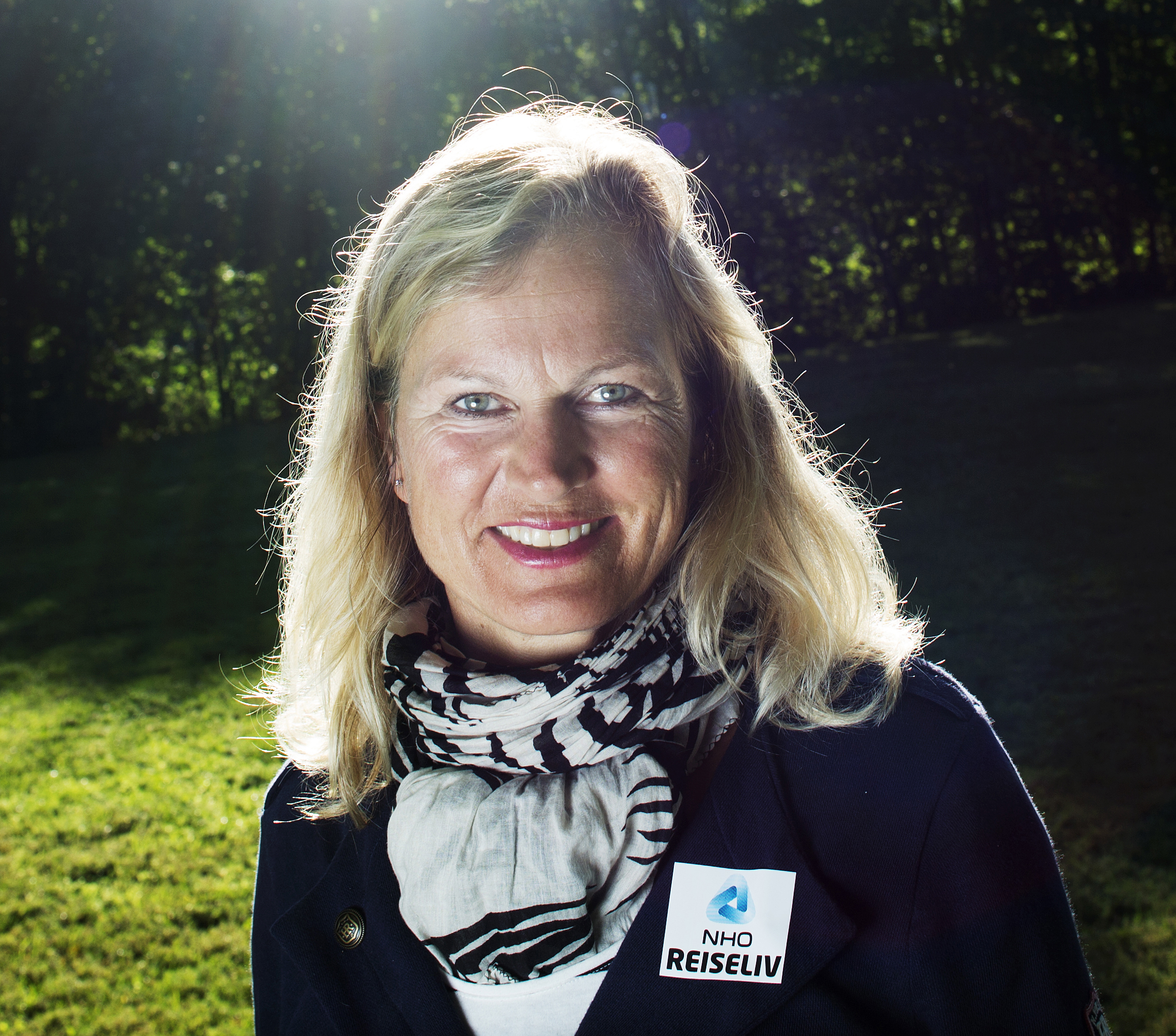
- Devold in September 2013

Minister of Defence
- In office 19 October 2001 – 17 October 2005
- Prime Minister: Kjell Magne Bondevik
- Preceded by: Bjørn Tore Godal
- Succeeded by: Anne-Grete Strøm-Erichsen

Member of the Norwegian Parliament
- In office 1 October 1993 – 30 September 2005
- Constituency: Oslo

Personal details
- Born: 12 August 1961 (age 65) Ålesund, Norway
- Party: Conservative Party
- Children: 2

Kristin Krohn Devold (born 12 August 1961 in Ålesund) is a former Minister of Defence of Norway. She was elected to three terms in the Norwegian Parliament from Oslo as a representative for Conservative Party.

== Education ==
She has a Master of Science Degree in Business from the Norwegian School of Economics, Bergen, 1985. She minored in sociology at the University of Bergen in 1986.

== Political career ==
On the local level Krohn Devold was a member of Oslo city council from 1991 to 1993.

She was elected to the Norwegian Parliament from Oslo in 1993, and was re-elected on two occasions as a representative for Conservative Party.

From 2001 to 2005, when the second cabinet Bondevik held office, Krohn Devold was Minister of Defence. During this term her seat in parliament was taken by Hans Gjeisar Kjæstad. Krohn Devold was mentioned as a possible candidate for the position of Secretary General of NATO after George Robertson, but eventually lost out to Jaap de Hoop Scheffer.

A November 2005 Dagbladet article wrote about her "controversial appointment" when in the autumn of 2005 she "appointed Karlsvik to chief of fellesstaben i Forsvaret. This was done before the national election—which led to her departure as chief of defence—and it resulted in strong reaction from the two trade unions BFO and Norges Offisersforbund. - The reactions came because the minister of defence sidelined chief of defence Sverre Diesen, and went outside the stipulations of hovedavtalen i Forsvaret. Dagbladet is aware that Sverre Diesen had a different candidate for this particular job."

== Business career ==
From 2006 to 2013 she was the secretary-general of the Norwegian Trekking Association. As of September 1, 2013 she is CEO of the Norwegian Hospitality Association. She is divorced and has two children.

Political offices
Preceded by Bjørn Tore Godal	Norwegian Minister of Defence; 2001–2005	Succeeded by Anne-Grete Strøm-Erichsen
