= Skjærpe =

Skjærpe is a Norwegian surname. Notable people with the surname include:

- Arvid Weber Skjærpe (born 1947), Norwegian journalist and director
- Bjørn Skjærpe (1898–?), Norwegian gymnast
