= Word of the year (Norway) =

Most important word of the year chosen in Norway

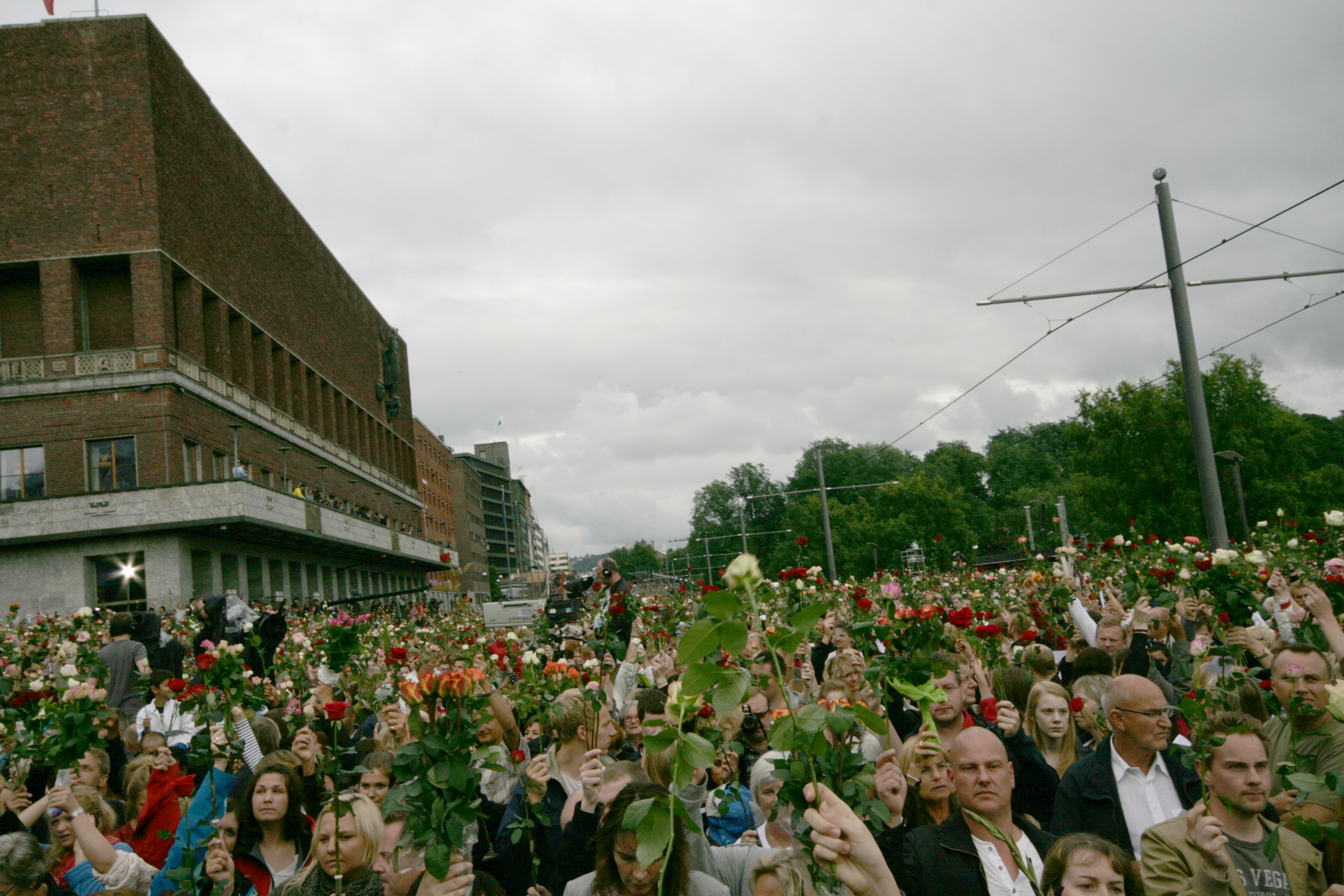
Rose marches after the 2011 Norway attacks made rosetog the word of the year in 2011

Årets ord (English: Word of the year) is named by the Language Council of Norway, since 2012 in cooperation with the Norwegian School of Economics.

Choices since 2008 have been finanskrise ('financial crisis'), svineinfluensa ('swine influenza'), askefast ('ash stuck'), rosetog ('rose march'), nave (referring to living on benefits from NAV, the public welfare agency, without really needing it) and sakte-TV ('slow-TV'). In addition, the language council mentions other notable words of the year; since 2012 it has listed ten words.

== Background and methodology ==
The Language Council of Norway has named Årets ord since 2008. Since 2012, the language council has co-operated with word researcher Gisle Andersen at the Norwegian School of Economics.

The methodology is based on new words that the language council manually picks up from the media during the year. The evaluation of such new words appears most frequently in electronic media text bases and suggestions from the public. The word of the year does not need to be a completely new word, but must have had an increase in use and a special relevance during the year. The committee also evaluates the language quality, in particular whether the word (or if international origin) works well in Norwegian. In addition, the committee considers whether the word is likely to stay in use.

== 2008 ==
Finanskrise ('financial crisis') was named word of the year. The word was not new – between 1947 and 1988, the word was used on average one to four times yearly in Norwegian media according to the search engine Atekst/Retriever. Later, the use of the word increased; in 1988, it was used 598 times and in 2007 it was used 218 times. In 2008, the word was used 10,732 times in newspapers, mainly after October.

== 2009 ==
Svineinfluensa ('swine influenza') was named word of the year. While the word had been used 17 times in Norwegian media until 23 April 2009, it was used more than 8,500 times during the rest of the year. Pandemi ('pandemic') was another notable word of the year. The words tvitre and tvitring, which relate to the use of Twitter, were also mentioned as notable new words, as was snikislamisering ('stealth Islamization').

== 2010 ==
Askefast ('ash stuck') was named word of the year. The word refers to people who were unable to travel as planned because of the air travel disruption after the 2010 Eyjafjallajökull eruption. Other mentions as notable words were app, nettbrett (tablet computer) and lesebrett (e-reader).

== 2011 ==
Rosetog ('rose march') was named word of the year. This referred to marches held in Oslo and other places in Norway following the 2011 terror attacks. Other notable words of the year also related to the terror attacks: kontrajihadisme ('counterjihadism') and ytringsansvar ('speech responsibility'). Other notable words of the year were gjeldskrise ('debt crisis') and eurokrise ('Euro crisis') referring to the situation in Europe, while smørkrise ('butter crisis') referred to the Norwegian butter crisis at the end of the year. Jasminrevolusjon ('jasmine revolution') also received mention.

== 2012 ==
Nave (verb) (and the noun naving) was named word of the year. The word refers to living on pension or welfare from the Norwegian Labour and Welfare Administration, a government agency called NAV in Norwegian. The word is primarily used for youth who stay out of work for some time. The word was used among youth themselves in 2012, but also among commentators and politicians who expressed worry that young people were abusing the system and not trying hard enough to get a job or start studying. Critics of the choice claimed the word was derogatory and added to the stigmatisation of people who receive welfare benefits.

Number	Word	Translation	Explanation
1	nave (naving)		To live on welfare from NAV for a time without really needing it. Mainly used about youth.
2	grovkarbo	'coarse carbohydrate'	Referring to food
3	bankunion	'bank union'	Proposal to create a bank union in the EU.
4	strøymeteneste/strømmetjeneste	'streaming'	Referring to streaming media
5	smartskule/smartskole	'smart school'	Schools which make wide use of high-tech solutions
6	monsterløn/monsterlønn	'monster wage'	Excessive wages for CEOs, etc.
7	halehelt	'tail hero'	Famous persons whose pictures are put on the tails of Norwegian airplanes
8	grexit	'Grexit'	Greece withdrawal from the eurozone
9	glanekø	'staring queue'	People stopping to stare at a car accident etc.
10	karbonsko	'carbon shoes'	Introduced in crosscountry skiing. Lighter and stiffer than ordinary shoes

== 2013 ==
Sakte-TV ('slow TV') was named word of the year. The word refers to a series of popular NRK live "marathon" coverage of events like rail trips and cruises, starting with Bergensbanen – minutt for minutt in 2009, continued with Hurtigruten – minutt for minutt and National Firewood Night as well as National Knitting Night in 2013. The high ratings for NRK's live broadcast from the World Chess Championship 2013 have also been seen as part of the slow-TV trend. The word and concept have been picked up internationally and it was named 2013 Best New Format by Television Business International.

Number	Word	Translation	Explanation
1	sakte-TV	'slow TV'	Live "marathon" television coverage of an event
2	rekkeviddeangst	'range anxiety'	Fear that a battery electric vehicle does not have enough range to arrive at its destination
3	gråblogg	'grey blog'	Blogs about the ordinary and grey sides of life
4	bitcoin	bitcoin	
5	blå-blå	'blue-blue'	Government coalition between the Conservative Party and the Progress Party.
6	betalingsmur	'paywall'	Reflecting an increasing number of Norwegian newspapers that use paywalls
7	avfølge	'unfollow'	Referring to social media
8	karbonboble	'carbon bubble'	The idea that economic growth based on carbon dioxide can not go on forever.
9	netthat	'net hate'	Harassment and hateful commentary on internet
10	revelyd	'fox noise'	Influenced by the Ylvis song "What does the Fox say"?

== 2014 ==
Fremmedkriger, meaning 'foreign fighter', was named word of the year. The choice reflected much focus in the Norwegian society on Norwegians who fight in the Syrian Civil war and related conflicts, mostly for ISIL. The word was used in Norwegian media for the first time in 2010 by the terrorism expert Brynjar Lia who had gotten the word from fellow terrorism expert Thomas Hegghammer.

Number	Word	Translation	Explanation
1	framandkrigar/fremmedkriger	'foreign fighter'	Norwegians fighting in the Syrian Civil War and related conflicts
2	viral	'viral'	Referring to viral media
3	emoji	'emoji'	
4	pøbelgran	'hooligan spruce'	Spruce trees planted outside their native growing area
5	stordata	'big data'	
6	gittercelle	'grid cell'	Neurons discovered by May-Britt and Edvard Moser
7	mobilnakke	'mobile phone neck'	Referring to "tech neck", forward neck posture due to using a mobile phone
8	luseskjørt	'louse skirt'	Funnel-like product to prevent salmon lice
9	ståhjuling	'standing wheel'	Generic term for self-balancing battery-powered two-wheeled vehicles such as the Segway
10	deleøkonomi	'sharing economy'	

== 2015 ==
The word of the year was det grøne skiftet/det grønne skiftet, referring to economic changes in an environmentally-friendly direction.

Number	Word	Translation	Explanation
1	det grøne skiftet/det grønne skiftet	'the green change'	Environmentally friendly changes
2	flyktningdugnad	'refugee dugnad'	Voluntary effort from individuals and government to help refugees
3	oljesmell	'oil crash'	Referring to the drop in oil prices and related changes in the economy
4	trinnskatt	'step tax'	Referring to tax brackets on income
5	utsleppsjuks/utslippsjuks	'emissions cheating'	In relation to the Volkswagen diesel emissions scandal
6	straksbetaling, also called vennebetaling	'immediate payment', 'friend payment'	Mobile payments
7	tasteplass	'typing area'	Internet-connected rest area (rasteplass)
8	pappakropp	'dad body'	"Dad bod"
9	nettvarde	'net beacon'	Internet connected beacons such as Bluetooth low energy beacons
10	asylbaron	'asylum baron'	Person who gets rich providing accommodations to asylum seekers and refugees

== 2016 ==
Hverdagsintegrering/kvardagsintegrering was chosen as the 2016 word of the year. Then-Prime Minister Erna Solberg popularized the term through using it in her annual New Year's speech. It refers to the work done by the public to help integrate refugees and immigrants into Norwegian society, showing that integration is not simply a governmental effort but also one undertaken by the average person.

Number	Word	Translation	Explanation
1	hverdagsintegrering/kvardagsintegrering	'everyday integration'	Public effort to integrate refugees and immigrants
2	lø		Popularized in the series Skam, meaning 'dumb, bad'
3	postfaktuell	'post-factual'	
4	fleksitarianer/fleksitarianar	'flexitarian'	
5	parallellsamfunn	'parallel society'	Referring to isolated social groups, including immigrants
6	brexit	'Brexit'	
7	formidlingsøkonomi	'intermediary economy'	Expands on sharing economy to include renting and selling
8	pokestopp/pokestop	'PokéStop'	Referring to part of the game Pokémon Go
9	burkini	'burkini'	Women's swimsuit covering the whole body
10	det mørke nettet	'the dark net'	The dark web

== 2017 ==
The 2017 word of the year was falske nyheter 'fake news'. Its use became popularized after the 2016 United States presidential election.

Number	Word	Translation	Explanation
1	falske nyheter	'fake news'	
2	lillavelger	'purple voter'	Voter who shifts between red and blue parties, particularly the Labour Party and Conservative Party
3	plasthval	'plastic whale'	A whale discovered with large amounts of plastic in its stomach
4	imamsleiking	'imam licker'	Used by politician Sylvi Listhaug to refer to sycophants of imams
5	spinner	'spinner'	Fidget spinner
6	svenske tilstander	'Swedish conditions'	Used in debate by those critical of immigration to refer to "Swedish conditions"
7	lynlader	'lightning charger'	Quick charger for electric cars
8	ekkokammer	'echo chamber'	
9	datarulling	'data rolling'	Referring to monthly rollover of unused data in mobile phone subscriptions
10	oktoberbarn	'October child'	Referring to Afghani asylum seekers who would be turning 18 in the fall of 2017 and returned to their country

== 2018 ==
The 2018 word of the year was skjebnelandsmøte 'destiny meeting'. Used in late autumn, when the Christian Democratic Party (KrF) would decide on which government alternatives they would negotiate to.

Number	Word	Translation	Explanation
1	skjebnelandsmøte	'destiny meeting'	
2	grottegutt	'cave boy'	Referring to the Tham Luang cave rescue in Thailand.
3	sosionomisere	'Social-working'	Derived from Social worker and -ize, meaning to address issues with understanding instead of targeted measures.
4	plogging	'Plogging'	
5	fattigdomslykke	'poor man's luck'	Title of book by author Martin Joyce Nygaard.
6	matredder	'food saver'	Opposite of a 'food waster', movement with intent to waste less food.
7	videoassistert dømming	'Video assistant referee'	
8	slitertillegg	'hardship allowance'	Additional pension benefit.
9	påvirker	'influencer'	social media influencer
10	gladbobler	'Happy bubbles'	Phrase said by Armed Forces colonel and head of the Home Guard; Håkon Warø, during a public meeting concerning the NATO-led Exercise Trident Juncture 2018.

== 2019 ==
The 2019 word of the year was klimabrøl 'climate roar'. Related to the high engagement among youth regarding climate change, Greta Thunberg is named as an example of this movement.

Number	Word	Translation	Explanation
1	klimabrøl	'climate roar'	
2	bunadsgerilja	'Bunad guerrilla'	Combination of Bunad and Guerrilla. Refers to a nationwide movement for good availability to maternity care, in reaction over a closing of a maternity ward in Kristiansund. The name is refers to the clothes worn by the activists.
3	kjøttskam	'Meat shame'	The feeling of shame or bad conscience about consuming meat, especially from an environmental perspective.
4	scenenekt	'Deplatforming'	Literally "scene denial".
5	kveikøl	'Kveik beer'	Traditional Norwegian beer brewing using Kveik yeast. The term came to prominence in Norway after being mentioned in the New York Times in an article of 52 places in the world to visit in 2019.
6	overturisme	'Overtourism'	
7	sovekapsel	'Sleep pod'	
8	helsesykepleier	'Public health nurse'	Additional pension benefit.
9	havvind	'Ocean wind'	Offshore wind power
10	skrønike	'Folk tale chronicle'	Portmanteau of the words skrøne (folk tale) and krønike (chronicle). Was used to describe a theatre play held at Trøndelag Teater, meant to name a new potential genre of historic retellings with less restrictions to following historical fact.
