= Nina Schanke Funnemark =

Norwegian civil servant

- Born: 1970 (age 55–56); Oslo, Norway
- Education: University of Oslo
- Occupation: Civil servant

Nina Schanke Funnemark (born 1970) is a Norwegian civil servant. She currently serves as director of the Norwegian Tax Administration, since 2020.

== Life and career ==
Born in Oslo in 1970, Funnemark graduated in jurisprudence from the University of Oslo in 1995.

She was assigned with the Norwegian Tax Administration from 2004. From 2018 to 2020 she served as director of the Norwegian State Educational Loan Fund.

In 2020 she was appointed director of the Norwegian Tax Administration for a period of six years, succeeding Hans Christian Holte.

Government offices
Preceded by Hans Christian Holte	Director of the Norwegian Tax Administration; 2020–present	Incumbent
