= Odd Strand =

Norwegian civil servant (1925–2008)

Odd Strand (21 August 1925 – 18 May 2008) was a Norwegian civil servant.

He was born in Aure Municipality, but grew up in Trondheim. During the German occupation of Norway he was a member of Milorg. He later studied at the University of Oslo, graduating as cand.philol. and later magister in political science in 1953.

He started a career in government ministries and agencies, and was appointed director of the Norwegian Central Information Service upon its creation in 1965. He remained director until 1993, when he reached the age limit. He was succeeded by Arne Simonsen. Statens Informasjonstjeneste no longer exists, as it was merged into Statskonsult in 2001.

New office	Director of the Norwegian Central Information Service; 1965–1993	Succeeded by Arne Simonsen
