= Erling Ree-Pedersen =

Norwegian civil servant (1922–2016)

Erling Ree-Pedersen (6 April 1922 – 5 August 2016) was a Norwegian civil servant.

He was born in Stavanger, but moved to Moss during the Second World War. He became involved in the illegal newspaper Norges Demring and joined Milorg. In 1999 he co-edited the book Motstandskamp og dagligliv i Mossedistriktet under krigen, a local World War II history.

After 1945, Ree-Pedersen worked as subeditor in Moss Avis and in private enterprise, among other things. From 1976 to 1982 he served as director of the Norwegian Tax Administration (Tax Director). He was also a board member of the Norwegian Data Protection Authority.

Government offices
Preceded by	Director of the Norwegian Tax Administration; 1976–1982	Succeeded by Willy Ovesen
