= Olav Ulleren =

Olav Ulleren (born 7 October 1954) is a Norwegian organizational leader, civil servant and former politician for the Centre Party. A veterinarian by education, he was a mayor and State Secretary during his political career, and has since made his mark as general director of the Norwegian Association of Local and Regional Authorities. He is currently CEO of The Norwegian Heart and Lung Patient Organization's clinics.

== Career ==
=== Early career ===
Ulleren was born in Tinn Municipality, and finished his secondary education in 1973. He took the cand.med.vet. degree at the Norwegian School of Veterinary Science in 1978, was a research assistant in 1979 and acting municipal veterinarian in Tinn in 1980. He then held two substitute jobs before doing his compulsory military service. From 1983 to 1991 he worked as the municipal veterinarian in Tinn. He later took a master's degree in Knowledge Management from the Norwegian School of Management.

=== Political career ===
Ulleren was a member of the municipal council of Tinn Municipality from 1983 to 1987, was not re-elected in 1987 but then returned in 1991. In 1991 he was elected deputy mayor, and in 1994 he became mayor of Tinn Municipality. Representing the Centre Party, he became the first non-Labour mayor of Tinn since 1945. With Ulleren at the helm, the Centre Party almost reached 45% in polls. Ulleren was re-elected in 1995 for a second four-year term, but on 10 May 1999, some months before the 1999 election, he was appointed State Secretary in the Ministry of Local Government and Regional Development as a part of the first cabinet Bondevik. Subsequently, the Centre Party in Tinn plummeted with 27.3 percentage points. Ulleren lost his State Secretary position when the first cabinet Bondevik lost a vote of no confidence on 17 March 2000.

During his time in politics, Ulleren was a member of the central committee of the Centre Party for ten years, and also chaired the county chapter in Telemark for six years. He ran as a candidate for the position as vice party leader on multiple occasions, but was never chosen.

Among his non-political assignments during this period was the contribution to the Norwegian Official Report 1998: 11. He was also chairman of the Industrial Development Corporation of Norway and Tinn Sparebank and a board member of Telemark University College during the 1990s.

=== Leaving politics ===
When his tenure as State Secretary ended, Ulleren did not return to local politics. Instead, he was hired as director in Bioparken. He also served as chair of Akvaforsk, and later as a member of the board of the Southern Norway Regional Health Authority and of Blefjell Hospital Trust. He was also a member of the Norwegian Council for Quality Improvement and Priority Setting in Health Care. Ulleren stopped paying the membership fee for the Centre Party in 2001, and in 2006 he described himself as "without a political attachment".

In 2002 Ulleren was hired as general director of the Norwegian Association of Local and Regional Authorities (KS). In addition to the usual task of negotiating wages with the trade unions of employees in the municipal sector, Ulleren marked himself as more politically involved than several of his predecessors. Notably, in 2006 Ulleren proposed that a Norwegian municipal reform be considered. In light of the recent reform in Denmark, it has been suggested that the number of municipalities of Norway be reduced, through mergers, from the current tally at around 430. Ulleren stated while a direct import of the Danish model was undesirable, something should be done in the way of merging some municipalities. Ulleren has also supported a regional reform. In 2003 he predicted the future abolishment of the county municipality and the county council, though at the end of his term in 2009, both still existed.

=== Civil servant ===
In late 2008, it was announced that Ulleren would become the new permanent under-secretary of State in the Ministry of Agriculture and Food in 2009, succeeding Per Harald Grue who was due to retire. The permanent under-secretary of State is the highest-ranking position in a Ministry, except for the partisan positions of Minister and State Secretary. Among the tasks in the Ministry of Agriculture is to represent the state party in the annual general price settlement on agricultural produce.

The decision to appoint Ulleren was criticized by Hans Frode Asmyhr of the Progress Party for being a perceived consolidation of the Centre Party. First, the Minister who was responsible for the appointment, Lars Peder Brekk, represents the Centre Party. Second, Asmyhr insinuated that the other parties in the agricultural settlement also represented the Centre Party. (Note: Quote: "Nå vil det sitje Sp-sympatisørar på alle sider av bordet." In English: "Now, sympathizers of the Centre Party will be seated on all sides of the table." (remark made by Asmyhr, written by the journalist in Nynorsk)) While both leaders of the main farmers' interest organizations, Pål Haugstad of the Norwegian Agrarian Association and Ole-Anton Teigen of the Norwegian Farmers and Smallholders Union, did support the appointment, Teigen is an active politician for the Socialist Left Party. Lars Peder Brekk deemed Asmyhr's allegations to be "clear-cut piffle", citing that Ulleren had the necessary qualifications for the position. In addition, other politicians from opposition parties, including Leif Helge Kongshaug (Liberal) and Torbjørn Hansen (Conservative), defended the appointment of Ulleren.

== Personal life ==
After leaving Tinn in 1999, Ulleren has lived in Bærum and Oslo. He still owns 20,000 decares of land in Tinn, which includes fields, forest and freshwater. Although he owns two dozen sheep, and sells licenses for fishing and Lagopus hunting on his estate, he uses the land mainly for recreation. Ulleren's hobbies include telemark skiing.

== References and notes ==
Notes

Preceded by Tom Veierød	Director of the Norwegian Association of Local and Regional Authorities; 2002–2009	Succeeded by Arvid Weber Skjærpe (acting)
