= Joakim Lystad =

Norwegian civil servant

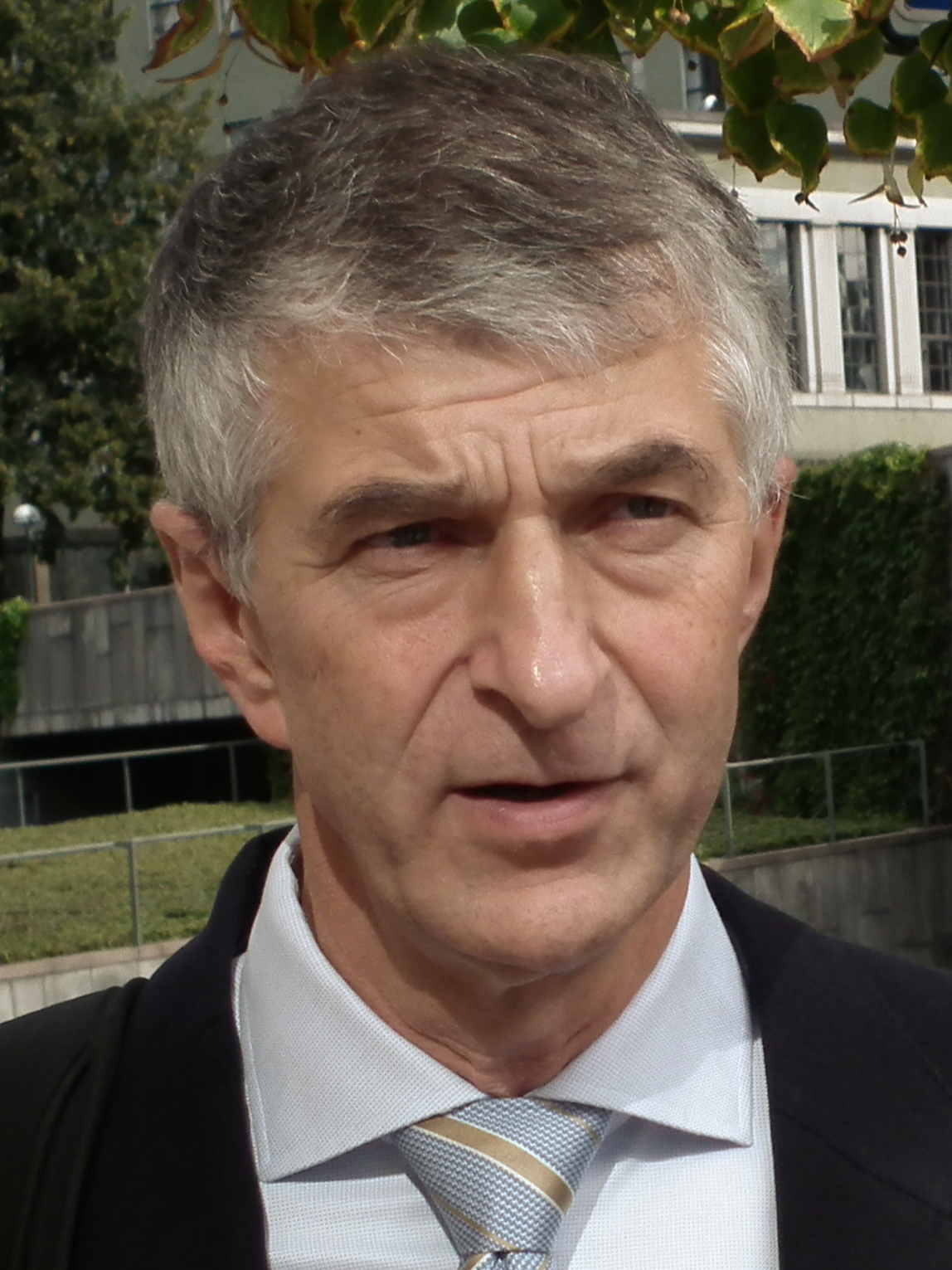

Director-General of the Norwegian Food Safety Authority
- In office 2003–2010
- Succeeded by: Harald Gjein

Labour and Welfare Director of Norway
- In office 2010–2015
- Preceded by: Tor Saglie
- Succeeded by: Sigrun Vågeng

Special adviser in the Ministry of Health and Care Services
- Incumbent
- Assumed office 2015

Personal details
- Born: 17 April 1953 (age 73) Oslo
- Education: MSc in environmental resource management

Joakim Theodor Haagaas Lystad (born 17 April 1953) is a Norwegian civil servant.

== Background and education ==
Born in Oslo, he is a grandson of the physician Harald Lystad. He received his cand.agric. (MSc) degree in environmental resource management from the Norwegian College of Agriculture in 1978 with a thesis on vegetation mapping in Oaldsbygda at Sunnmøre.

== Career ==
He worked as a researcher at the Norwegian College of Agriculture and then at the Norwegian Institute for Water Research. From 1991 to 1995 he was Assistant Director General and head of the industry department at the Ministry of the Environment, and from 1995 to 2002 he was director of planning and control at the Norwegian Pollution Control Authority.

In 2002, he was appointed by the King-in-Council as the first Director-General of the Norwegian Food Safety Authority, that was established the following year by the merger of 4 state agencies and 89 municipal agencies.

In 2010, he was appointed by the Norwegian government as head of the Norwegian Labour and Welfare Administration. He did not originally apply for the office, but was asked to take the post by minister of labour Hanne Bjurstrøm. He left the office on 10 April 2015, and was appointed as a special adviser in the Ministry of Labour. In the autumn of 2015, he was appointed as a special adviser in the Ministry of Health and Care Services. In 2017 he was appointed by the Ministry of Justice and Public Security as chairman of the working group on police reform that made recommendations on the future structure of the police force and its recruitment.

Preceded by Position created	Director-General of the Norwegian Food Safety Authority; 2003–2010	Succeeded by Harald Gjein
Preceded by Tor Saglie	Labour and Welfare Director of Norway; 2010–2015	Succeeded by Sigrun Vågeng
