= Eva Bjøreng =

Norwegian trade unionist

Eva Bjøreng (born 23 January 1953) is a Norwegian trade unionist.

She was born in Notodden. She started her career in banking, became a union representative in Kreditkassen and became a leading figure in the Finance Sector Union of Norway. From 1993 to 1996 she led the Confederation of Vocational Unions, and from 1996 to 1998 she was director of training in the same organization. She was then information director in the Norwegian Hospitality Association from 1998 to 2001, and secretary-general of Norwegian People's Aid from 2001.

Business positions
Preceded by Jan Andersen-Gott	Leader of the Confederation of Vocational Unions; 1993–1996	Succeeded by Randi Bjørgen
