= Jan Andersen-Gott =

Norwegian naval officer and trade unionist

Jan Andersen-Gott (born 5 October 1941) is a Norwegian naval officer and trade unionist.

He was born in Vågå Municipality in Oppland county and lives at Jarmyra. He took his education at the Norwegian Naval Academy and the Sjøforsvarets stabsskole, worked as an active naval Commander before being secretary of Sjømilitære Samfund and the naval officers' trade union. From 1987 to 1993 he led the Confederation of Vocational Unions. He then worked in the Norwegian Association of Local and Regional Authorities.

Business positions
Preceded by Gunnar Caspersen (acting)	Leader of the Confederation of Vocational Unions; 1987–1993	Succeeded by Eva Bjøreng
