= Tore Eugen Kvalheim =

Norwegian trade unionist

Tore Eugen Kvalheim (born 4 March 1959) is a Norwegian trade unionist.

An infantry captain in the Norwegian Army, he became chief of negotiation in the trade union Norwegian Military Officers' Association. In 2001 he became leader of YS Stat, the division for state employees in the Confederation of Vocational Unions. He also became deputy leader, and in 2006 leader of the Confederation of Vocational Unions. He resigned in 2013 to become director of the employers' association Spekter.

Business positions
Preceded by Randi Bjørgen	Leader of the Confederation of Vocational Unions; 2006–2013	Succeeded by Jorunn Berland (acting)
