= Bjørgen =

Origin
- Language: Norwegian
- Meaning: barrow, hill
- Region of origin: Norway

Bjørgen is a surname and it may refer to:

- Marit Bjørgen, Norwegian cross-country skier
- Randi Bjørgen, Norwegian trade unionist
