= Arne Simonsen =

Norwegian civil servant (born 1941)

Arne Simonsen (born 1941) is a Norwegian civil servant.

He was born in Haugesund, and graduated as cand.mag. from the University of Bergen. He worked as a civil servant in Bergen municipality, the Norwegian Central Information Service, the Ministry of Church and Education, and the Norwegian Directorate of Immigration. From September 1992 to June 1993 he was a political advisor for the Minister of Social Affairs in the third cabinet Brundtland.

In 1993 he was appointed director of the Norwegian Central Information Service (Statens Informasjonstjeneste), succeeding Odd Strand who had reached the age limit. The Norwegian Central Information Service no longer exists, as it was merged into Statskonsult in 2001.

Preceded by Odd Strand	Director of the Norwegian Central Information Service; 1993–2001	Succeeded by position abolished
