= Caspar Stephansen =

Norwegian civil servant

Caspar Stephansen (23 July 1923 – 11 April 1996) was a Norwegian civil servant.

He was born in Kragerø. During the occupation of Norway by Nazi Germany he fled to Sweden and took part in the exiled police corps Rikspolitikorpset. He studied law between 1945 and 1950, when he graduated with the cand.jur. degree. He was hired in the Directorate of Rationalisation, then in the Ministry of Defence in 1952. He was an assisting counsellor at the Norwegian NATO delegation in Paris from 1959 to 1962, took the NATO Defence College in 1965 and was a counsellor in the NATO delegation in Brussels from 1970 to 1972. In 1972 he was promoted from assistant secretary to deputy under-secretary of state in the Ministry of Defence. From 1974 to 1989 he was the permanent under-secretary of state, the highest-ranking bureaucratic position. From 1989 to his retirement in 1993 he was a special adviser.

He died in 1996.

Civic offices
Preceded by Erik Himle	Permanent under-secretary of state in the Ministry of Defence; 1974–1989	Succeeded by Åge Danielsen
