= Difi =

Difi, DiFi or DIFI can refer to:

- Agency for Public Management and eGovernment (Norwegian: Direktoratet for forvaltning og ikt, short: Difi), a Norwegian government agency subordinate
- Dianne Feinstein, American politician
- Difi (cell line), a type of cancer cell line
- Difi (river), a river in the Central African Republic
- Difi (watercourse), a watercourse in Guinea
