= Sigrun Vågeng =

Norwegian public sector official (born 1950)

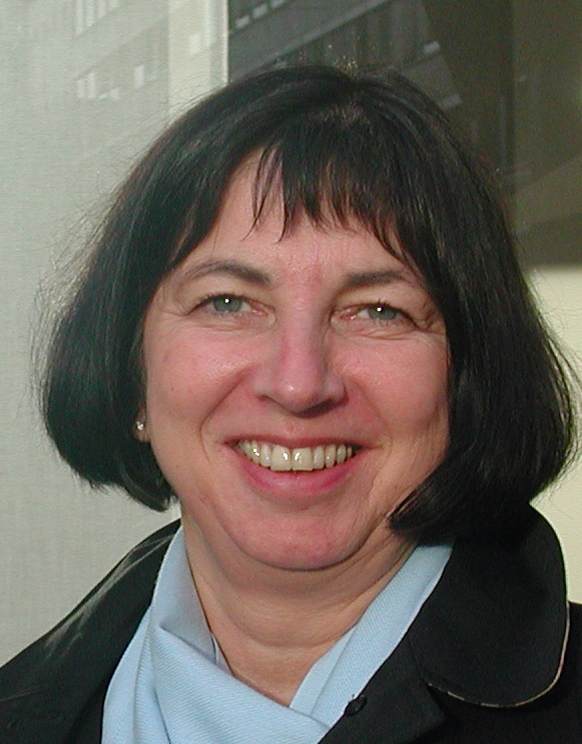

Director of the Norwegian Labour and Welfare Administration
- In office 2015–2020

Director of the Norwegian Association of Local and Regional Authorities
- In office 2009–2013

Personal details
- Born: 29 October 1950 (age 75)
- Education: Norwegian School of Economics and Business Administration

Sigrun Elisabeth Vågeng (born 29 October 1950) is a Norwegian public sector official. From 2015 to 2020 she was director of the Norwegian Labour and Welfare Administration.

She took her education at the University of Oslo in 1975, graduating as cand.mag., and took an MBA degree at the Norwegian School of Economics and Business Administration in 2001. The September 18, 2015 she became Director of Labour and Social Welfare, the head of the Administration of Norwegian Labour and Welfare (NAV) after Joakim Lystad. Previously she was director of the Norwegian Association (KS). She is the leader of several organizations of employers and director of the National Institute for Consumer Research.

She worked as chief staff officer at Grand Hotel, Oslo from 1980, and in 1990 she became director of the employers' association Norsk Hotell- og Restaurantforbund, a forerunner of the Norwegian Hospitality Association. From 1994 to 2001 she was a sub-director in the Federation of Norwegian Process Industries. In 2002 she became the executive director for labour market and social affairs in the Confederation of Norwegian Enterprise. She also represented her organization in the National Wages Board. In 2009 she became the director of the Norwegian Association of Local and Regional Authorities (KS). She resigned from her position in KS in October 2013, after a disagreement with the boardmembers. From March 2014 until March 2015 he headed a committee that created suggestions on how to improve the Nav organization. Sigrun Vågeng was appointed to the Council on 10 September 2015 as Director of Labour and Welfare (NAV leader) of governments Solberg. She receives an annual salary of 1.85 million NOK (220,000 USD - August 2016).

She is a member of the board of the Norwegian Chamber Orchestra, and from 1992 to 1994 of Oslo Lufthavn AS, the company that manages Oslo Airport, Gardermoen.

Preceded by Arvid Weber Skjærpe (acting)	Director of the Norwegian Association of Local and Regional Authorities; 2009-2013	Succeeded by TBA
