= Bjarne Johannes Hope =

Norwegian civil servant (1944–2006)

Bjarne Johannes Hope (30 March 1944 - 30 June 2006) was a Norwegian civil servant.

He was born in Masfjorden Municipality. Having graduated from the Norwegian Institute of Technology in 1968 as siv.ing., he worked as a consultant from 1972. From 1995 to his death in 2006 he served as director of the Norwegian Tax Administration.

Shortly before his death he was awarded the Order of St. Olav. He was the brother of Einar Hope.

Government offices
Preceded by Willy Ovesen	Director of the Norwegian Tax Administration; 1995–2006	Succeeded by Svein Kristensen
