= Åge Danielsen =

Norwegian civil servant (born 1942)

Åge Danielsen (born 22 June 1942) is a Norwegian civil servant.

He was born in Narvik, and holds the cand.oecon. degree in economics. He has been chief administrative officer for Nordland County Municipality from 1980 to 1989, then permanent under-secretary of state in the Ministry of Defence from 1989 to 1995. From 1995 to 1997 he was the director of Statskonsult. He left in 1997 to become director of Rikshospitalet, and Tore Lorentzen served as acting director from February until Jon Blaalid was hired as new director in the summer. Danielsen was director of Rikshospitalet from 1997 to 2008, when he was fired.

He resides at Jar.

Civic offices
Preceded by Caspar Stephansen	Permanent under-secretary of state in the Ministry of Defence; 1989–1995	Succeeded by John Arthur Lunde
Preceded by Tom Veierød	Director of Statskonsult; 1995–1997	Succeeded by Tore Lorentzen (acting)
