= Arvid Weber Skjærpe =

Norwegian journalist and director (born 1947)

External image
- Portrait at KS

Arvid Weber Skjærpe (born 9 October 1947) is a Norwegian journalist and director.

== Career ==
Weber Skjærpe was born in Stavanger, where he was a member of the Young Liberals of Norway in the 1960s. Skjærpe later graduated with the cand.polit. degree in political science at the University of Oslo. He also taught political science and sociology at the University of Oslo and was editor-in-chief of the student newspaper Universitas from 1971 to 1972. Skjærpe worked as journalist for Norwegian Broadcasting Corporation in 11 years, before becoming cultural director for Stavanger Municipality in 1985. Controversy arose when he stated that Oslo did not deserve to host the 1986 Eurovision Song Contest, claiming it had "neglected the culture". The travel director of Oslo stated that his claim was wrong, pointing to Oslo Municipality's recent investments like Det Norske Teatret.

In 1986 Skjærpe wanted to become editorial chief of NRK P1. He instead returned to his position as a journalist in NRK before becoming editor-in-chief of A/S Avis. After A/S Avis was discontinued after a few months, Skjærpe became editor of Radio Nettverk. In 1992 Skjærpe was hired as a fellow worker for NRK Radio in Oslo. In 1994 he was hired as information manager for the Norwegian Association of Local and Regional Authorities. In 1997 Weber Skjærpe was promoted to director of communications and strategy in the same association, where he has been ever since. Skjærpe was also the acting chief executive of the association in 2009. He took over from Olav Ulleren, until Sigrun Vågeng took over. Weber stayed in the association as director of communications and strategy.

== Works ==
- Selvstyre som system, 1977
- Jakten på det gode liv, 1984
- Arbeid for alle?, 1984

Preceded by Olav Ulleren	Director of the Norwegian Association of Local and Regional Authorities (acting); 2009	Succeeded by Sigrun Vågeng
