= Erik Lund-Isaksen =

Norwegian civil servant (born 1951)

Erik Lund-Isaksen (born 26 February 1951) is a Norwegian civil servant.

He was born in Ulefoss, and holds the cand.jur. degree. He started his career in the prison administration, was a consultant in the Norsk institutt for personaladministrasjon from 1986 to 1987 before being hired as a head of department in the Ministry of Justice and the Police. He was a permanent under-secretary of state from 1993 to 2002, then the director of the Norwegian Consumer Council from 2003 to 2008, and is the permanent under-secretary of state (the highest-ranking civil servant position) in the Ministry of Defence from 2008.

Civic offices
Preceded by Per Anders Stalheim	Director of the Norwegian Consumer Council; 2003–2008	Succeeded by Randi Flesland
Preceded by John Arthur Lunde	Permanent under-secretary of state in the Ministry of Defence; 2008–2017	Succeeded by Arne Røksund
