= Norge.no =

Website for public services in Norway

- Website type: Government portal
- Available in: Norwegian Bokmål; Norwegian Nynorsk; English
- Owner: Agency for Public Management and eGovernment
- Creator: Norwegian Ministry of Government Administration and Reform
- Website: www.norge.no www.noreg.no www.norge.no/en

Norge.no is a web guide for citizens to access online public services in Norway. The web portal has information about how citizens can communicate digitally with public authorities, log into public services and choose a digital mailbox.

The portal has information in Norwegian (bokmål and nynorsk) and in English.

The web portal is operated by Agency for Public Management and eGovernment (Difi) which is subordinate to the Ministry of Local Government and Modernisation.

== History ==
The web portal www.norge.no was launched 24 January 2000 as part of a government initiative in cooperation with the Norwegian Association of Local and Regional Authorities (KS). The portal was designed to give citizens and public sector employees a comprehensive view of public administration in Norway. The portal's editing team was located in Leikanger, Sogn og Fjordane.

On 1 January 2002, Opplysningstjenesten i staten, a help desk service, was merged with the portal service www.norge.no to form Norge.no - the official gateway to public services and information. On 3 June 2004, and English version of the portal, www.norway.no, was launched.

Initially, Norway.no was a project run by the Office of the County Governor in Sogn og Fjordane. Then, on 1 January 2005, Norway.no was reorganised as a public agency, Norge.no, subordinate to the Norwegian Ministry of Government Administration, Reform and Church Affairs. In addition to running the portal and help desk, Norge.no the agency was responsible for developing quality assessment criteria for evaluating public web sites. It was also responsible for developing and running the online one-stop shop for public digital services, Minside (MyPage).

On 1 January 2008, Norway.no was merged with two other public agencies, Statskonsult and the Norwegian eProcurement Secretariat, to form the Agency for Public Management and eGovernment (Difi).

On 31 May 2012, the one-stop shop for public digital services, Minside, was closed down[2]. Most of the content from Minside was made available via the Norge.no portal.

On 18 March 2013, the Norge.no portal was reinvented as a catalogue of public digital services from the Norwegian public sector. The portal's help desk was closed down on the same date.

On 15 January 2015, a new version of Norge.no was launched. It is a guide to digital public services from public authorities in Norway. Norge.no is the main channel for the Norwegian government to inform citizens on how they can become digital citizens; how they can communicate digitally with public authorities in Norway, and how to set up a digital mailbox account.
