= Gunnar Caspersen =

Norwegian trade unionist

Gunnar Caspersen (1932/1933 – 8 February 2000) was a Norwegian trade unionist.

He started his career as a union representative in the bank Den norske Creditbank, and became informational secretary in Norske Bankfunksjonærers Forbund in 1965. In 1979 he became secretary-general. He was deputy leader of the Confederation of Vocational Unions from 1979 to 1985, and leader from 1986 to 1987. In 1995 he became an honorary member of the Finance Sector Union of Norway. He died in February 2000.

Business positions
| Preceded by Eldri Langåker | Leader of the Confederation of Vocational Unions; 1986–1987 (acting) | Succeeded by Jan Andersen-Gott |
