= Heidi Heggenes =

Norwegian civil servant

- Born: 1965 (age 60–61)
- Education: University of Oslo
- Occupation: Civil servant

Heidi Heggenes (born 1965) is a Norwegian civil servant. She currently serves as permanent under-secretary of state in the Ministry of Justice.

== Personal life and career ==
Born in 1965, Heggenes studied jurisprudence at the University of Oslo.

She served seven years as deputy under-secretary of state (ekspedisjonssjef) at the Office of the Prime Minister. In June 2018 she was appointed permanent under-secretary of state (departementsråd) in the Ministry of Justice and Public Security, succeeding Tor Saglie.

Civic offices
Preceded by Tor Saglie	Permanent under-secretary of state in the Ministry of Justice and Public Security; 2018–present	Incumbent
