= John Arthur Lunde =

Norwegian civil servant (born 1948)

John Arthur Lunde (born 14 March 1948) is a Norwegian civil servant.

He holds the cand.mag. degree. He was hired in the Ministry of Defence in 1974, and was in the Norwegian NATO delegation from 1976 to 1980. He was a deputy under-secretary of state from 1992 to 1995, and the permanent under-secretary of state (the highest-ranking civil servant position) from 1995 to 2008.

Civic offices
Preceded by Åge Danielsen	Permanent under-secretary of state in the Ministry of Defence; 1995–2008	Succeeded by Erik Lund-Isaksen
