= National Insurance Service =

Norwegian government agency

Logo.

The National Insurance Service (Norwegian: Trygdeetaten) was a Norwegian government agency responsible for social security.

== Organization ==
It had its roots in the National Insurance Administration (Norwegian: Rikstrygdeverket), which was founded by parliamentary act on 23 July 1894 under the name Rigsforsikringsanstalten. The National Insurance Administration was the core of the agency, which also consisted of county and local offices for social security. The agency was subordinate to the Norwegian Ministry of Labour.

== Successor ==
In 2005 the Parliament of Norway agreed to abolish the National Insurance Service as well as the employment office Aetat, with effect from 2006. A new organization was created in their place, the Norwegian Labour and Welfare Administration (Norwegian: Arbeids- og velferdsforvaltningen, NAV) which consists of the state-run Norwegian Labour and Welfare Service (Norwegian: Arbeids- og velferdsetaten) and certain parts of the municipal social services, and has a broader responsibility for welfare. The reform that created NAV is not completed yet.
