= Svalbard Minute by Minute =

2020 Norwegian slow TV program

- Directed by: Thomas Hellum
- Presented by: Kari Toft; Helge Lyngmoe
- Country of origin: Norway
- Original language: Norwegian

Production
- Running time: 13,319 minutes
- Production company: NRK Hordaland

Original release
- Network: NRK2
- Release: 31 January – 9 February 2020

Svalbard Minute by Minute (Norwegian: Svalbard minutt for minutt) is a 221-hour-long 2020 Norwegian slow television broadcast that aired on NRK2 between 31 January at 18:00 to 9 February at 23:59 (CET). The broadcast shows the MS Spitsbergen's nine-day voyage around Spitsbergen, the only permanently-inhabited island of Svalbard, which commemorated the 100-year anniversary of the Svalbard Treaty, a treaty signed on 9 February 1920 which gave Norway sovereignty over Svalbard. Lasting a total of 13,319 minutes, it is NRK's longest slow television broadcast as of February 2022.

== Production ==
Director Thomas Hellum conceived the idea for Svalbard Minute by Minute in 2011 after completing Hurtigruten Minute by Minute, a slow television broadcast which followed the 134-hour long voyage of MS Nordnorge from Bergen to Kirkenes. The footage for the broadcast was shot by an NRK crew of 25 people earlier in August 2019 in order for better lighting conditions during midnight sun and because the voyage was too far north to broadcast live. In total, seventeen cameras were used, including camera drones.

== Broadcast and content ==
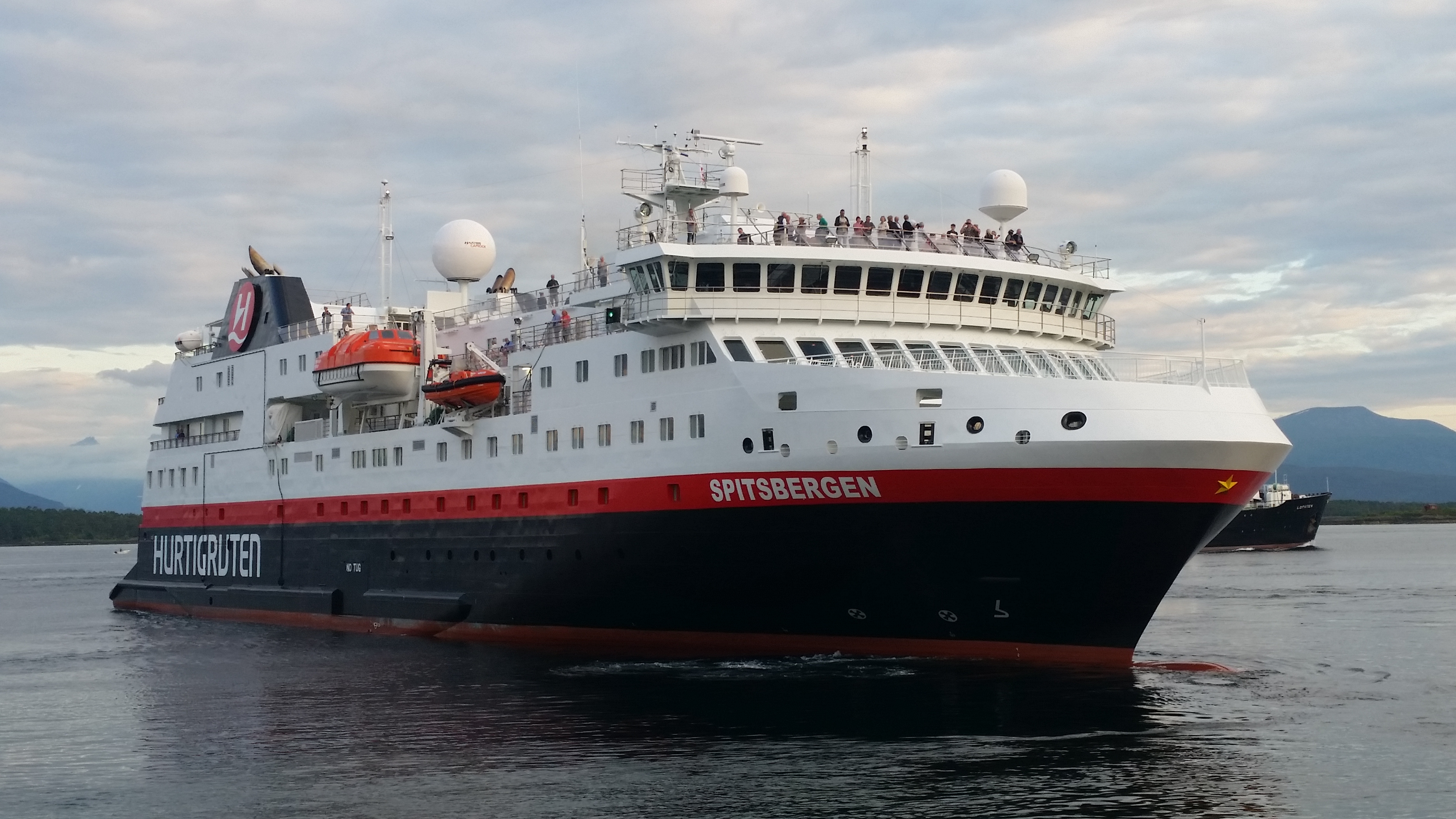
The MS Spitsbergen

The entire 221-hour long voyage of the MS Spitsbergen around Spitsbergen, Svalbard was broadcast without interruption on NRK2 between 31 January at 18:00 to 9 February at 23:59 (CET), and was also made directly available for streaming on NRK TV. Alternatively, one-hour highlights from each day of the voyage were broadcast on NRK1 between 1–9 February. In the broadcasts, hosts Kari Toft and Helge Lyngmoe observe the ongoings of the ship, and conduct interviews with passengers and crew members. They were assisted by archaeologist and Svalbard historian Per Kyrre Reymert and former Svalbardposten editor Arne O. Holm.

=== Voyage ===
MS Spitsbergen's voyage:

- 1 February, day one: Departure from Longyearbyen to Lloyds Hotel in Möllerfjorden
- 2 February, day two: Lloyds Hotel to Smeerenburg
- 3 February, day three: Smeerenburg to Bock Fjord
- 4 February, day four: Bock Fjord to Murchinson Fjord
- 5 February, day five: Murchinson Fjord to Hinlopen Strait
- 6 February, day six: Hinlopen Strait to Boltodden
- 7 February, day seven: Boltodden to Burger Bay
- 8 February, day eight: Burger Bay to Recherche Fjord
- 9 February, day nine: Recherche Fjord to Nordenskiöldbreen, arrival in Longyearbyen

== Viewership and reception ==
Svalbard Minute by Minute received 2.3 million viewers during its broadcast. John Einar Lockert, manager of Svalbard Adventures, attributed the broadcast to a 25 percent increase in tourist bookings to visit Svalbard. In September 2020, the Norwegian Polar Institute named a headland in Burger Bay Minute Island after the broadcast.
