= Eldri Langåker =

Norwegian trade unionist

Eldri Langåker (born 3 March 1944) is a Norwegian trade unionist.

She worked in Televerket from 1962 to 1987, but had a long trade union career. From 1973 to 1979 she was deputy leader of the trade union Kvinnelige Telegraf- og Telefonfunksjonærers Landsforening, and from 1979 to 1981 she was the leader. She led the Confederation of Vocational Unions from 1981 to 1986. Since then she has worked in Oslo municipality.

Business positions
Preceded by Egil Sandberg	Leader of the Confederation of Vocational Unions; 1981–1986	Succeeded by Gunnar Caspersen (acting)
