= Special adviser (Norway) =

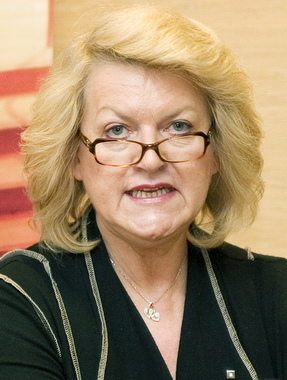
Janne Kristiansen was appointed as a special adviser in the Ministry of Justice and Public Security after she stepped down as head of the Norwegian Police Security Service

A special adviser or special advisor (Bokmål: spesialrådgiver; Nynorsk: spesialrådgjevar) is a high-ranking civil servant in the Norwegian civil service with rank code (stillingskode) 1220 in the Norwegian state. The Ministry of Finance has stated that special advisers belong to the "highest career level" in government departments. Special advisers may be highly qualified experts or people with high-level experience from the government service, including former top executives of government agencies. The title is used in government departments, where special advisers are the single most highly paid category. The rank is also used in other parts of the civil service, including directorates and health trusts. In the Basic Collective Agreement (hovedtariffavtalen) for the Norwegian state, special advisers have the second highest minimum pay grade, ranking above all the director ranks and second only to a rarely used rank for the most senior attorneys with the Office of the Attorney General of Norway.

== In government departments ==
Special advisers are high-ranking advisers, generally without managerial responsibilities. The Ministry of Finance has stated that special advisers belong to the "highest career level" in government departments. They tend to have a particularly independent role within their organization. They may be highly qualified experts or people with high-level experience from the government service, including former top executives of government agencies who go on to work in a government ministry. There is only a small number of special advisers. As of 2021, there were 81 special advisers, 310 policy directors (fagdirektør) og 2,114 senior advisers among the three highest classes of advisers across the government departments. Special advisers are the single most highly paid category in the government administration and some earn more than the Prime Minister. For example, Jonas Gahr Støre, Kai Eide, Bjørn Tore Godal, Erik Solheim, Georg Fredrik Rieber-Mohn, Ann-Marit Sæbønes, Harald Rensvik, Anne Kari Lande Hasle, Janne Kristiansen, Tore Eriksen, Hans Brattskar, and Joakim Lystad are or have been special advisers in the Norwegian central government.

In some respects, they are similar to special advisers in the UK government, with the exception that they are permanent civil servants rather than political appointees.

Special Advisers in government departments
Director General	Special Adviser, management-level but no set position
Deputy Director General	Special Adviser, management-level but no set position
Assistant Director General	Special Adviser, management-level but no set position
Policy Director	Special Adviser, management-level but no set position
Senior Adviser	
Adviser
Higher Executive Officer
