= Norwegian Military Officers' Association =

Norwegian trade union

The Norwegian Military Officers' Association (Norwegian: Befalets Fellesorganisasjon) is a trade union in Norway, organized under the national Confederation of Vocational Unions.

It was founded in 1957 as a merger of various officers' associations. It had about 5,150 on-duty members in 2014.

Its headquarters are located in Oslo, and the leader is Jens Jahren. It publishes the magazine Offisersbladet.

== See also ==
- Norwegian Officers' Union
