= Harald Gjein =

Norwegian veterinarian and civil servant

Director-General of the Norwegian Food Safety Authority
- Incumbent
- Assumed office 2011
- Preceded by: Joakim Lystad

Personal details
- Born: 3 June 1955 (age 70) Stokke

Harald Johannes Gjein (born 3 June 1955 in Stokke) is a Norwegian veterinarian and civil servant, and the current director-general of the Norwegian Food Safety Authority. He was appointed by the King-in-Council on 15 April 2011 and took office on 1 June 2011, succeeding Joakim Lystad.

He graduated as a veterinarian at the Norwegian School of Veterinary Science in 1980, and holds a dr.scient. degree from 1994, with the dissertation Housing of pregnant sows: a field study on health and welfare, with special emphasis on claw lesions. He was CEO of the swine producers' association Norsvin from 2000 to 2007 and deputy director of the Norwegian Veterinary Institute 2007–2009 and director 2009–2011.

Civic offices
Preceded by Joakim Lystad	Director of the Norwegian Food Safety Authority; 2011−	Incumbent
