= Slow television =

Television genre

Slow television, or slow TV (Norwegian: sakte-TV), is a genre of "marathon" television coverage of an ordinary event in its complete length. Its name is derived both from the long endurance of the broadcast as well as from the natural slow pace of the television programme's progress. It was popularised in the 2000s by the Norwegian Broadcasting Corporation (NRK), beginning with the broadcast of a seven-hour train journey in 2009.

== Background ==
An early example of extended length cinematography was artist Andy Warhol's 1964 film Sleep, which showed poet John Giorno sleeping for five hours and twenty minutes. Warhol's production process involved splicing and looping of film that he had originally shot in 3-4 minute lengths. The concept was adapted to slow television on local TV broadcast in 1966 by WPIX, to VHS video tape in 1984 by the British company Video125, to satellite TV in 2003 by Bahn TV, and to live TV in 2011 by the Norwegian Broadcasting Corporation (NRK).

The latest evolution of the concept started with the NRK's coverage of the longest driver's eye view at that time, showing the complete 7-hour train ride along the Bergen Line (Norwegian: Bergensbanen) on 27 November 2009. It was followed by the live coverage of the Hurtigruten ship MS Nordnorge during its 134-hour voyage from Bergen to Kirkenes starting on 16 June 2011.

Both events received extensive attention in both Norwegian and foreign media, and were considered a great success with coverage numbers exceeding all expectations and record ratings for the NRK2 channel.

== Earlier examples ==
Several artists have created films or videos which paved the way for slow television. Among them are Andy Warhol, with films such as Sleep, a 320-minute looped film showing a person sleeping, and Brian Eno, who created the video Mistaken Memories of Medieval Manhattan (1980–81), which displayed views of the Manhattan skyline and drifting clouds.

=== Fishcam ===
Fishcam is a broadcast consisting of a camera pointed at a fish tank. Such broadcasts have inclucded NRK's programme called Pausefiskene (Pause-fishes) in black-and-white since 1965, converting to colour in the 1970s. In Canada, when St. John's television station NTV first commenced 24-hour broadcasting in the early 1970s, one of its overnight programmes was a continuous shot of a fish tank. The Danish DR TV used an aquarium as an interlude between 1981 and 1985, during long breaks between programming, with a camera recording the TV-Byen aquarium. In 1992 when the German Ostdeutscher Rundfunk Brandenburg (ORB) launched, ORB Aquarium was among the original programmes, consisting of a 30-minute loop of fish. Its success led to similar programmes such as Space Night, first shown on Bayerischer Rundfunk in 1994.

=== United States: Sunrise Earth ===
Sunrise Earth is a nature documentary television series that began syndication in September of 2004, and last aired in the United States in 2008 on HD Theater (originally Discovery HD Theater), which has since been reformatted and rebranded as Velocity. The series focused on presenting the viewer with sunrises in various geographical locations throughout the world. It is also notable for its complete lack of human narration, concentrating instead on the natural sounds of each episodes' specific location. The technique has been described by TV critic Tom Shales as 'crazily uneventful and thoroughly wonderful.'...64 one-hour shows were created in the first four years of production.

The series moved between 30-second shots of various scenes of nature around the world at early dawn, progressing in real time until finally culminating with the sunrise at one location. In later seasons, these locations were selected by viewers.

== NRK (Norway) ==
Starting in 2009 NRK, Norway's public service broadcaster, has produced several slow television programs that have gained high ratings. Sakte-tv (Norwegian for 'Slow-TV') was named Word of the Year in Norway in 2013.

=== 2009: Bergensbanen – minutt for minutt ===
Bergensbanen NRK 2009 (part 1)

Bergensbanen NRK 2009 (part 2)

Bergensbanen NRK 2009 (part 3)

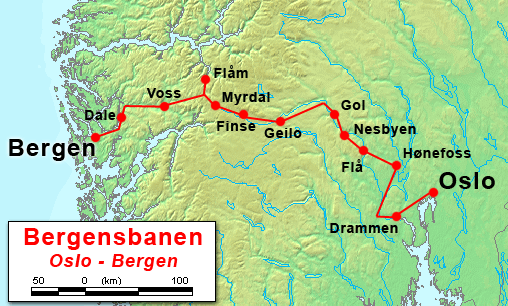
The Bergen Line with the principal stations used in the 2009 broadcast.

NRK's first foray into slow television was Bergensbanen minute by minute – train journey across Southern Norway, which depicted the 7-hour train journey from Bergen to Oslo along the Bergen Line (Norwegian: Bergensbanen). It was aired on NRK2 on 27 November 2009 and came to be described as "the iconic slow-TV program". The event was planned as part of the 100-year anniversary of the existence of the Bergen Line. Four cameras were used to produce the documentary, showing both exterior and interior views, along with interviews with crew, train conductors, historians, past workers and passengers. The train went through 182 tunnels. Archival clips from the Bergen Railway's 100-year history were shown when the train passed through tunnels, to make the final show last exactly as long as the train trip. The show was first broadcast on 27 November 2009, while the recording had been done earlier during summer.

The program was followed by an average of 176,000 viewers, and 1,246,000 Norwegian viewers (20% of the population) were watching the event at least once during its screening time. The event received attention in both Norwegian and foreign media, and has received renewed attention and appreciation, mainly among its Norwegian followers.

=== 2010: Bybanen i Bergen – minutt for minutt ===
The 28-minute presentation Bybanen i Bergen – minutt for minutt showed a trip on the Bergen Light Rail from Nesttun to Bergen, shortly after the opening of the line in June 2010.

=== 2010: Flåmsbana – minutt for minutt ===
Following the success from the Bergen Line, NRK also filmed the Flåm Line in May 2010.

Flåmsbana minute by minute – scenic tourist route, train journey depicted the trip along the Flåm Line, a 20.2-kilometre (12.6 mi) railway that descends 863 m (2,831 ft) from Myrdal to Flåm on the Sognefjord. It was broadcast on NRK1 on 5 September at 08.05, lasting 58 minutes, and around 500,000 viewers watched the entire programme, for a market share of 40%.

=== 2011: Hurtigruten – minutt for minutt ===
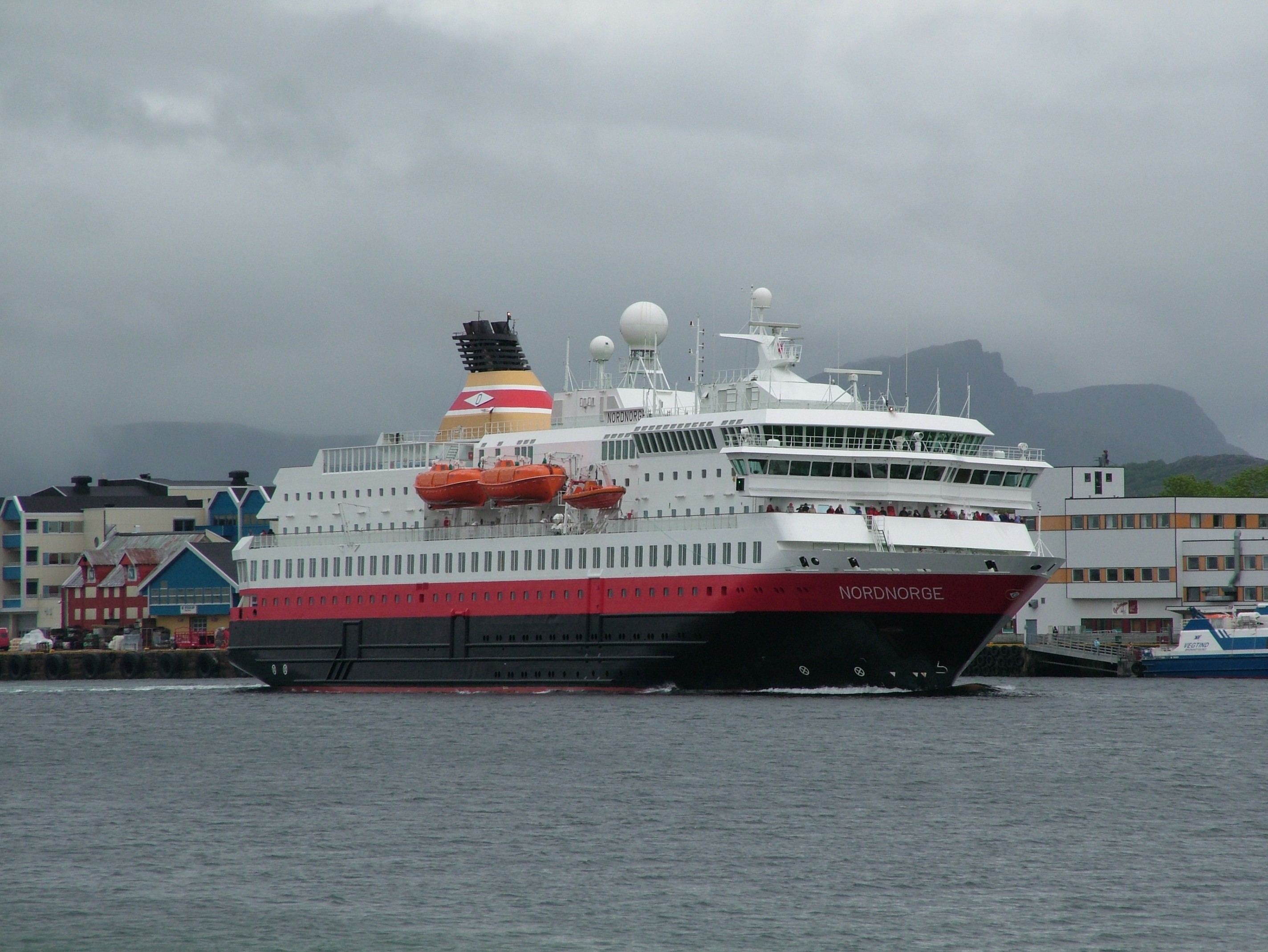
MS Nordnorge, the ship used in the live broadcast in 2011

Hurtigruten minute by minute – a coastal voyage from Bergen to Kirkenes depicted the Norwegian Coastal Express (Norwegian: Hurtigruten) ship MS Nordnorge on a 134-hour voyage from Bergen to Kirkenes. The programme started on 16 June 2011 at 19:45 CET on NRK and transmitted the entire journey live and non-stop. A total of 11 cameras—three fixed, a bow camera and a gyro-stabilised Cineflex camera—recorded the journey.

The broadcast was shown live on NRK2 in Norway, and on the internet for international viewers and Norwegians abroad, available in Norwegian and English. The broadcast received greater attention and popularity than the previous Bergensbanen minutt for minutt show, both in media and by viewers.

During the weekend of 17–19 June 2011, 2,542,000 people, or approximately half the Norwegian population, visited the live broadcast. At its peak, 692,000 people followed the broadcast at 23:45 Sunday night, as the boat was heading into the Trollfjord in Lofoten. The broadcast has set a world record as being the world's longest live television documentary and is in the Guinness Book of Records. The previous record was 13 hours against their 134 hours.

In 2012, Hurtigruten – minutt for minutt was included in Norsk Dokumentarv which is the Norwegian part of the Memory of the World Programme.

=== 2012: Lakseelva – minutt for minutt ===
Salmon river – minute by minute was a 24-hour-long live broadcast on NRK1 and NRK2 that depicted the opening day of fishing season on the Gaula River in Trøndelag and lasted from 31 May to 1 June 2012. It consisted of a 40-minute introduction on NRK1, 18 hours of live salmon fishing on NRK2, and a 3-hour regular broadcast on NRK1. Around 1.6 million watched the broadcast, earning 10 per cent of the market share.

=== 2012: Telemarkskanalen – minutt for minutt ===
Telemarkskanalen minute by minute – channel boat trip was a 12-hour cruise along the Telemark Canal that was broadcast live on NRK2 on Sunday 26 August 2012. 1,300,000 watched the broadcast in Norway, for a market share of 29 per cent.

=== 2012: Nordlandsbanen – minutt for minutt ===
Nordlandsbanen minute by minute – season by season – train journey north of the Arctic Circle depicted a 9-hour and 50 minute journey on the Nordland Line railway from Trondheim to Bodø. It was broadcast on NRK2 on 29 December 2012 and had a viewership of around 1.2 million, for a market share of 13 per cent.

=== 2013: Nasjonal vedkveld ===
On 15 February 2013, NRK broadcast the 12-hour-long broadcast National Wood Night on the topic of firewood. Nearly a million people, or 20 per cent of the population, tuned in at some point of the programme. The broadcast was inspired by the best-selling book by Lars Mytting, Solid Wood: All About Chopping, Drying and Stacking Wood — and the Soul of Wood-Burning. The show consisted of four hours of ordinary produced television, followed by showing eight hours of a live fireplace. The show received international attention, including an article in The New York Times, and a segment on The Colbert Report.

=== 2013: Sommeråpent – minutt for minutt ===
Summer Entertainment Show – coastal cruise with entertainment show, a journey from Oslo to Kirkenes and back was a coastal cruise with entertainment from Oslo to Kirkenes and back. The approximately 379-hour show was broadcast live on NRK1 from Saturday 22 June to Sunday 10 August 2013.

=== 2013: Nasjonal strikkekveld ===
On 1 November 2013, NRK aired National Knitting Night, a 12-hour show depicting a non-stop knitting marathon which attempted to break the Guinness World record for knitting a sweater from beginning to end. An NRK spokesperson described the show as "the feminine response to the firewood show."

=== 2014: 200 år på 200 minutter ===
In 200 years in 200 minutes – lecture performed by professor Frank Aarebrot, political scientist Frank Aarebrot gave a 200-minute lecture on the past 200 years of Norwegian history. 700,000 viewers watched the broadcast, which ran from 8:05 to 11:30 am on 28 February, gaining a 15 per cent share of viewership.

=== 2014: 1814 på 24 timar ===
1814 in 24 hours commemorated the signing of the Constitution of Norway in 1814. Around 50 academics lectured for 24 hours straight from Rikssalen in Eidsvollsbygningen, the building where the constitution was originally signed. The show broadcast from 9 May to 10 May 2014, with a viewership of 669,000, or 6 per cent market share.

=== 2014: Piip-show ===
Piip-show featured footage from a camera set up to record the activities of birds and other wildlife at a bird feeder decorated to look like a coffee shop. A website run by NRK streamed live footage from the camera for three months, and NRK2 also featured a 14-hour television programme showing live footage on 25 May 2015, with a viewership of 243,000.

=== 2014: Salmeboka – minutt for minutt ===
On 28–30 November 2014, NRK aired the 60-hour Hymnal – cover to cover. The show depicted about 200 choirs, including around 3,000-4,000 singers and soloists, performing the entire contents of the Church of Norway's national hymnal, published in 2013. Most of the performances took place live at Vår Frue Church in Trondheim, though some recorded performances came from 11 other sites such as Karasjok in northern Norway and Decorah, Iowa. The church was open throughout the show, and more than 16,000 visitors dropped in. A total of 2.2 million viewers tuned in at some point during the programme, with an average of 87,000 at any one time.

=== 2015: Krig på 200 minutter ===
War in 200 minutes featured a 200-minute lecture from Frank Aarebrot on the subject of war. It was broadcast on 9 April 2015, the 75th anniversary of the German occupation of Norway in 1940. The programme received a viewership of 238,000 with a market share of 21.4 per cent.

=== 2015: Sommerbåten – minutt for minutt ===
Summer boat – coastal cruise with entertainment show, a journey from Vadsø to Oslo depicted a live coastal cruise from Vadsø in northern Norway to Oslo in southern Norway. The show lasted from Sunday 21 June until Saturday 15 August.

=== 2016: Saltstraumen – minutt for minutt ===
Saltstraumen – minute by minute was a 12-hour show depicting live footage from the Norwegian strait of Saltstraumen, site of one of the strongest tidal currents in the world. It was broadcast on 7 May 2016.

=== 2016: Skibladners seilas – minutt for minutt ===
Skibladner cruise – minute by minute was a week-long show depicting footage of a cruise of the paddle steamer Skibladner on lake Mjøsa in southern Norway, and it was broadcast to coincide with the 160th anniversary of the ship's launch.

=== 2016: USA-valget: 227 år på 227 minutter ===
In US Elections: 227 years in 227 minutes, Frank Aarebrot spent 227 minutes discussing the US presidential election of 2016 and the history of elections in the US.

=== 2016–present ===
2016

- Hele Norge bygger – minutt for minutt (All of Norway builds – minute by minute)
- Ribba – grad for grad (The pork rib – degree for degree)

2017

- Reinflytting minutt for minutt (Reindeer migration minute by minute)
- Sommertoget (The summer train)
- Besseggen minutt for minutt (Besseggen minute by minute)

2018

- Grieg minutt for minutt (Grieg minute by minute)
- Monsen minutt for minutt (Monsen minute by minute)

2019

- Klokken minutt for minutt (The clock – minute by minute)

2020

- Svalbard minutt for minutt (Svalbard Minute by Minute)
- 7-fjellsturen fjell for fjell (Seven Mountains, Bergen mountain by mountain)

=== Interaction through social media ===
During the 134 hour broadcast of the Hurtigruten trip, the show received massive attention among Norwegian followers in the social media arena. On Facebook, Twitter, and blogs, people talked about the trip and how they followed its progression.

As the boat moved north, place names popped up in the top 10, such as #Sortland and #Trollfjord. Around midnight Saturday there was one tweet about Hurtigruten per six seconds.

During the broadcast, cities competed in arranging the greatest welcoming committee at the different harbours and three different wedding proposals were captured during the 136 hours.

=== International attention ===
The Hurtigruten – minute by minute broadcast was also shown online with many viewers abroad; 46 per cent of online viewers were outside Norway. The major countries were Denmark (7%), United States (4%), Germany (4%), United Kingdom (4%), and France (4%), gaining attention in international media.

During the days of the broadcast, the Norwegian Embassy in Seoul organised a campaign on the subway to promote Norway. A billboard set up in Samgakji subway station in downtown Seoul was set up to broadcast the show live. Korean media showed interest in the exhibition, characterising it as "the most creative PR stunt they've heard of in a long time".

== International adaptations ==
=== Australia: Special Broadcasting Service ===
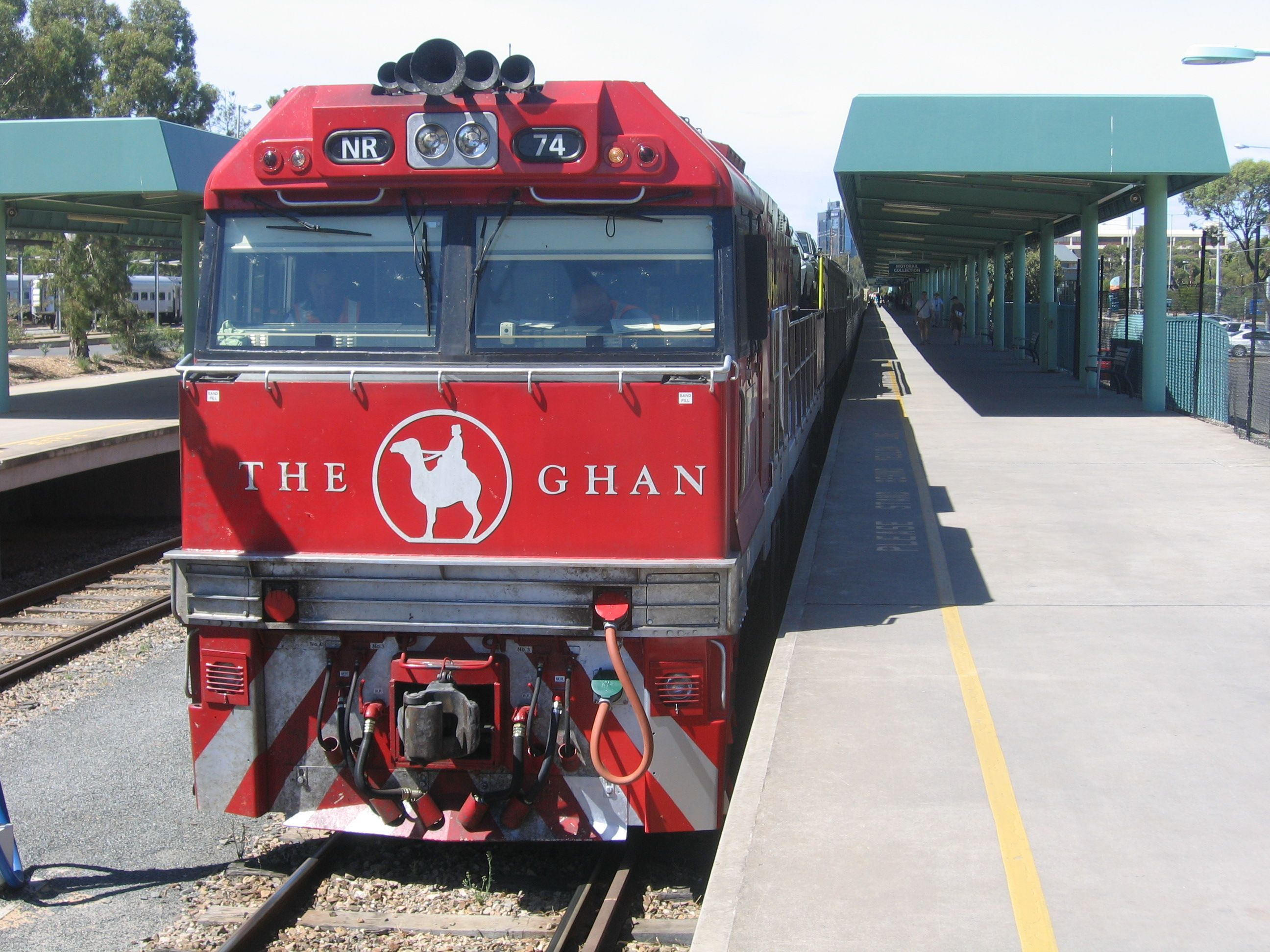
The Ghan at Adelaide Parklands Terminal

On the evening of 7 January 2018, the Special Broadcasting Service (SBS) broadcast on its main TV channel the first Australian-made slow TV style programme, a three-hour-long documentary of a journey aboard The Ghan, the passenger train from Adelaide to Darwin. The three-hour programme also used both archival imagery and contemporary graphics to tell the story of the construction of the 2,979 km (1,851 mi) Adelaide–Darwin railway and that of its predecessor, the Central Australia Railway.

According to OzTAM's overnight preliminary ratings, the SBS telecast of the three hour programme averaged more than 400,000 viewers, with most of the audience being in Melbourne. SBS later issued a media release stating that the three-hour programme had "... recorded an average of 583,000 viewers in metro and regional markets ... making this the highest performing SBS program in the past 12 months ...". SBS also scheduled a broadcast of a longer, 17-hour, version of the programme on SBS Viceland on Sunday, 14 January 2018, from 2.40am to 8.30pm.

In November 2018, SBS announced a series of four Slow TV programmes, covering rail, road, canal and river, to be broadcast in January 2019.

=== Belgium: Voor De Ronde ===
The Belgian public-service broadcaster VRT aired a live broadcast of Ruben Van Gucht, a sports reporter, riding the route of the Tour of Flanders road cycling race, accompanied by anyone who wanted to join him. The event took place on 31 March 2017, two days before the race. The journey was filmed by several motorcycle cameramen and a helicopter and was accompanied by live studio commentary about the journey and the history of the Tour of Flanders.

=== China ===
The British channel BBC Four broadcast on 3 February 2019 a journey along the Great Wall of China.

=== Hong Kong: RTHK TV 32 Slow TV (Chinese: 漫電視) ===
Radio Television Hong Kong (RTHK)'s TV 32 [zh] has aired a series of live broadcasts such as the make-up of a Cantonese opera actor, a Hong Kong Tramways journey, the scenery of Victoria Harbour, animals' routine activities, and so on.

=== United Kingdom: BBC Four Goes Slow ===
As an adaptation of the style, the British channel BBC Four in 2015 and 2016 broadcast a series of slow journeys such as a canal boat journey and bus ride.

=== Spain ===
==== Aragón TV "El viaje" ====
On 1 January 2019, "El viaje" brought this genre to Spain for the first time with the full and uninterrupted broadcast on Aragón TV of the popular "Canfranero" [es], the railway that links Zaragoza with Canfranc on the occasion of the 90th anniversary of the inauguration of the Pyrenean international station. Viewers were shown 218.39 kilometres of the train's complete route from its departure from Zaragoza to its arrival in the Pyrenees, the landscapes of the capital's urban environment, the extensive fields of the Huesca basin and the valleys of the Gállego and Aragón rivers.

==== betevé "Slow" ====
Barcelona's local TV station, betevé, features a series of short programs titled "Slow." These programs, typically around 10 minutes in length, utilize a fixed action camera to capture various aspects of daily life in the city, such as a metro journey, a worker's routine, or other leisurely-paced scenes. The "Slow" series is available on betevé's YouTube channel, and is frequently used in the station's broadcast schedule to fill gaps between programs, thus avoiding the need for excessive advertisements.

=== France: France 4 in association with Eden TV ===
France 4, on 31 March 31, 2014, aired a nine-hour programme of a man walking backwards through Tokyo, "Tokyo Reverse", directed by Simon Buisson and Ludovic Zuili, and on October 3, 2015, the same channel aired a six-hour programme, "Slow Moscow", directed by Romain Quirot, following in real time a couple of dancers strolling through the streets of Moscow.

=== Iceland ===
On 20 June 2016, the year's summer solstice, Sigur Rós unveiled a 24-hour 'slow TV' event live on the Iceland national broadcaster's RÚV 2, and streamed live globally via YouTube. It featured the journey along the entirety of Iceland's Route 1, which loops around the perimeter of the country, while playing a live-generated remix of the band's song "Óveður".

=== New Zealand ===
==== Go South ====
PRIME, on 19 January 2019, aired "Go South", a 3 and/or 12 hour production cut from over 40 hours of footage of travel from Auckland to Milford Sound, by train, ferry, and car. The broadcast incorporated not only static cameras of the vehicle, but also drone and helicopter shots of notable locations and bridges.

The production first aired in its 3-hour form at 9:30pm, 19 January 2019, with the 12-hour variant following at 1:30am, 20 January 2019.

==== Go Further South ====
On 10 April, PRIME TV aired another production, an edit of a month-long sea voyage from Stewart Island to Antarctica. The show was broadcast uninterrupted from 7:30am to 7:30pm.

=== Sweden: Den stora älgvandringen ===
Sveriges Television presented Den stora älgvandringen ("The Great Moose Migration") from 15 April to 5 May 2019, with continuous coverage of outdoor scenes and migrating moose. The production used 22 cameras installed at several sites, including at river crossings frequently used by the animals in their annual journey to summer grounds. The programme was streamed on the internet continuously and portions were broadcast. The 2022 season had more cameras and the online option to stay tuned to individual cameras on the website SVT Play. In 2022, cameras were able to film 67 moose crossing the river Ångermanälven and the broadcast was extended to 11 May. The 2024 season had 32 cameras and the online option to stay tuned to individual cameras on the website SVT Play and 87 crossing moose were counted.

=== Germany: Die große Elchwanderung ===
In 2024, RTL+ showed for the first time SVT's livestram Den stora älgvandringen, also three hours a day are broadcast at Geo TV, beginning from 22 April (Earth Day) to 9 May. During the broadcasts one could also see a "moose counter" to indicate how many moose have swum across the river so far.

=== Portugal: Linha do Douro – Um Património Sobre Carris ===
On 1 January 2024, Portugal public broadcaster RTP aired on its main television channel, RTP1, the documentary "Linha do Douro – Um Património Sobre Carris" with over 3 hours and 30 minutes of uninterrupted footage of a 171,5 km train journey across the Douro line, from São Bento railway station in Porto to Pocinho railway station, aboard a CP class 1400 locomotive.

== Web-based slow TV transmissions ==
=== 1999–2012: Nocinema.org by Jérôme Joy ===
French artist and composer Jérôme Joy developed an ever-evolving streaming online application, NoCinema, with multiple cameras in different sites around the world offering a project between documentary and fiction and generating infinite audio-visual sequences.

=== 2007: Cheddarvision.tv by West Country Farmhouse Cheesemakers ===
On January 1, 2007, West Country Farmhouse Cheesemakers in Dorset, England, began the one-year live streaming of a round of Westcombe Dairy cheddar maturing on their shelf.

=== 2016: Terms and conditions word by word ===
To illustrate the wordiness of the terms and conditions on an average phone, the Norwegian Consumer Council staged a reading of 30 such legal documents in a session that started on 24 May 2016 and was streamed for more than 24 hours.

=== iDNES Slow TV ===
The Czech media group MAFRA has run a slow TV portal since 2010. Currently under brand iDNES TV it shows videos from:

- a railway station: Prague – Smíchov, Prague – Vršovice
- largest model train track in central Europe called Království Železnic
- planespotting – the runway of the Prague airport (the most popular video)
- hippopotamus exhibition in ZOO Dvůr Králové
- wild horses and aurochs in Milovice reserve
- polar bear in ZOO Brno
- Prague central webcam
- Beehive – outside and inside with IR light

This set of transmissions is updated every now and then. In the past, for example, meerkats of the Prague Zoo or infrared picture of Prague's Old Town Square were shown.

=== 2005–present: Watching Grass Grow by Alek Komarnitsky (alias Mister Grass) ===
Watching Grass Grow has shown a continuous live feed of a front lawn since 2005.

== Media coverage ==
British filmmaker Tim Prevett's documentary film That Damned Cow: Just what is Norwegian Slow TV? described early slow TV productions from NRK. He has compared the appeal of slow television to the revival of vinyl LP records as a format for audio recordings.

== See also ==
- Desert Bus – Canceled video game
- Music On A Long Thin Wire – Musical piece by Alvin Lucier
- Norppalive – Freshwater seal found in Finland
- Slow cinema – Genre of art cinema
- Slow movement (culture) – Social movement
