= Hans Gjeisar Kjæstad =

Norwegian politician

Hans Gjeisar Kjæstad (born 2 January 1947, in Porsgrunn) is a Norwegian politician for the Conservative Party.

He served as a deputy representative in the Norwegian Parliament from Oslo during the terms 1997–2001, 2001–2005 and 2005–2009. During the entire middle term he sat as a regular representative, replacing Kristin Krohn Devold who was appointed to the second cabinet Bondevik.

Kjæstad was a deputy member of Oslo municipality council from 1983 to 1995.
