= Norwegian Agricultural Inspection Service =

- Industry: Food safety
- Founded: 1984
- Defunct: 1 January 2004
- Fate: Merger
- Successor: Norwegian Food Safety Authority
- Headquarters: Oslo, Norway
- Parent: Norwegian Ministry of Agriculture and Food

Norwegian Agricultural Inspection Service (Norwegian: Landbrukstilsynet) was a defunct Norwegian government agency that was responsible for inspection of farms and agricultural facilities in the country. On 1 January 2004 it merged with a number of other agencies to create the Norwegian Food Safety Authority.

== History ==
The agency was created in 1984 when a number of previous independent agencies were merged to create the inspection service. Prior to this each agency had a specialized field for control, including independent agencies for inspection of seeds, plant breeding, plant inspection, toxins, agricultural chemicals, vegetable conservations, margarine and dairy products. None of these had any inter-agency coordination, creating chaos.
