= Vestkysten =

Norwegian newspaper (1987)

Vestkysten was a Norwegian newspaper that was established on 16 September 1987. It was founded in Stavanger with capital from private enterprise and interested businesspeople. Editor-in-chief was Arvid Weber Skjærpe. The newspaper was disestablished in the same year, on 24 November.
