= Norwegian eProcurement Secretariat =

The Norwegian eProcurement Secretariat (Norwegian: E-handelssekretariatet) was a Norwegian government agency responsible for managing electronic commerce throughout the Government of Norway and other public bodies. The agency's two primary goals were to increase the use of e-commerce in the public sector and to ensure that electronic services and support functions to improve public procurement efficiency were developed. The agency was created in 2005, and was merged with Norge.no and Statskonsult to create the Agency for Public Management and eGovernment on January 1, 2008.
