= Norwegian Officers' Union =

Norwegian trade union

The Norwegian Union of Military Officers (Norwegian: Norges Offisersforbund) is a trade union in Norway, organized under the national Norwegian Confederation of Trade Unions.

It was founded in 1896, and eventually got the name Norges Befalslag. In 1978 it was merged with Luftforsvarets Befalsforbund to form Norges Befalsforbund. the name it has currently was adopted in 1986. It had about 6,500 members in 2005.

Its headquarters are located in Oslo. It publishes the magazine Befalsbladet.

== See also ==
- Norwegian Military Officers' Association
