= Norwegian Food Safety Authority =

National agency for ensuring food safety

- Company type: Government agency
- Industry: Food safety
- Founded: 2003
- Headquarters: Oslo, Norway
- Area served: Norway
- Key people: Harald Johannes Gjein (Director General)
- Number of employees: 1,300 (2007)
- Parent: Norwegian Ministry of Agriculture and Food
- Website: www.mattilsynet.no

Norwegian Food Safety Authority (Norwegian: Mattilsynet) is a Norwegian government agency responsible for safe food and drinking water, and works within the fields of human, plant, fish and animal health as well as environmentally friendly production and ethically acceptable farming of animals and fish. Other duties are related to cosmetics, medicines and inspection of animal health personnel.

Main offices are located in Oslo while there are 63 district and eight regional offices. There are also three national competence centers: fish and seafood in Bergen, plants and vegetarian foods in Ås, and animals and carnivore food in Sandnes. The agency was created in 2003 when four government agencies (the States Food Authority, the Fisheries Directories Seafood Control, the States Animal Authority and the Norwegian Agricultural Inspection Service) were merged with 69 municipal food authorities.

== See also ==
- Food Administration
