= Confederation of Vocational Unions =

National trade union center

YS
- Confederation of Vocational Unions
- Yrkesorganisasjonenes Sentralforbund
- Founded: 17 January 1977
- Headquarters: Oslo, Norway
- Members: 225,794 (2019)
- Key people: President Jorunn Berland
- Affiliations: ITUC, ETUC, NFS, TUAC
- Website: www.ys.no

The Confederation of Vocational Unions (Norwegian: Yrkesorganisasjonenes Sentralforbund, YS) is a national trade union center, an umbrella organization of labour unions in Norway.

It was established in 1977 as a non-partisan alternative to the Norwegian Confederation of Trade Unions (LO). It is affiliated to the International Trade Union Confederation, the European Trade Union Confederation, the Council of Nordic Trade Unions and the Trade Union Advisory Committee to the OECD.

== Affiliates ==
Union	Membership (2022)
Association of School Leaders	4,340
AVYO	
Norwegian Public Sector Trade Union (Delta)	94,891
Finance Sector Union	33,242
Military Officers' Association	11,045
National Tax Agency Union (SkL)	
Negotia	21,535
Norwegian Customs Union	
Parat	41,055
Prison and Probation Service Trade Union (KY)	
Professional Traffic Union	12,623
SAFE	11,399
Union of Civil Servants (STAFO)	1,773

== Presidents ==
1977: Egil Sandberg
1981: Eldri Langåker
1986: Gunnar Caspersen (acting)
1987: Jan Andersen-Gott
1993: Eva Bjøreng
1996: Randi Bjørgen
2006: Tore Eugen Kvalheim
2013: Jorunn Berland
