= Norwegian butter crisis =

Late 2011 shortage of butter in Norway

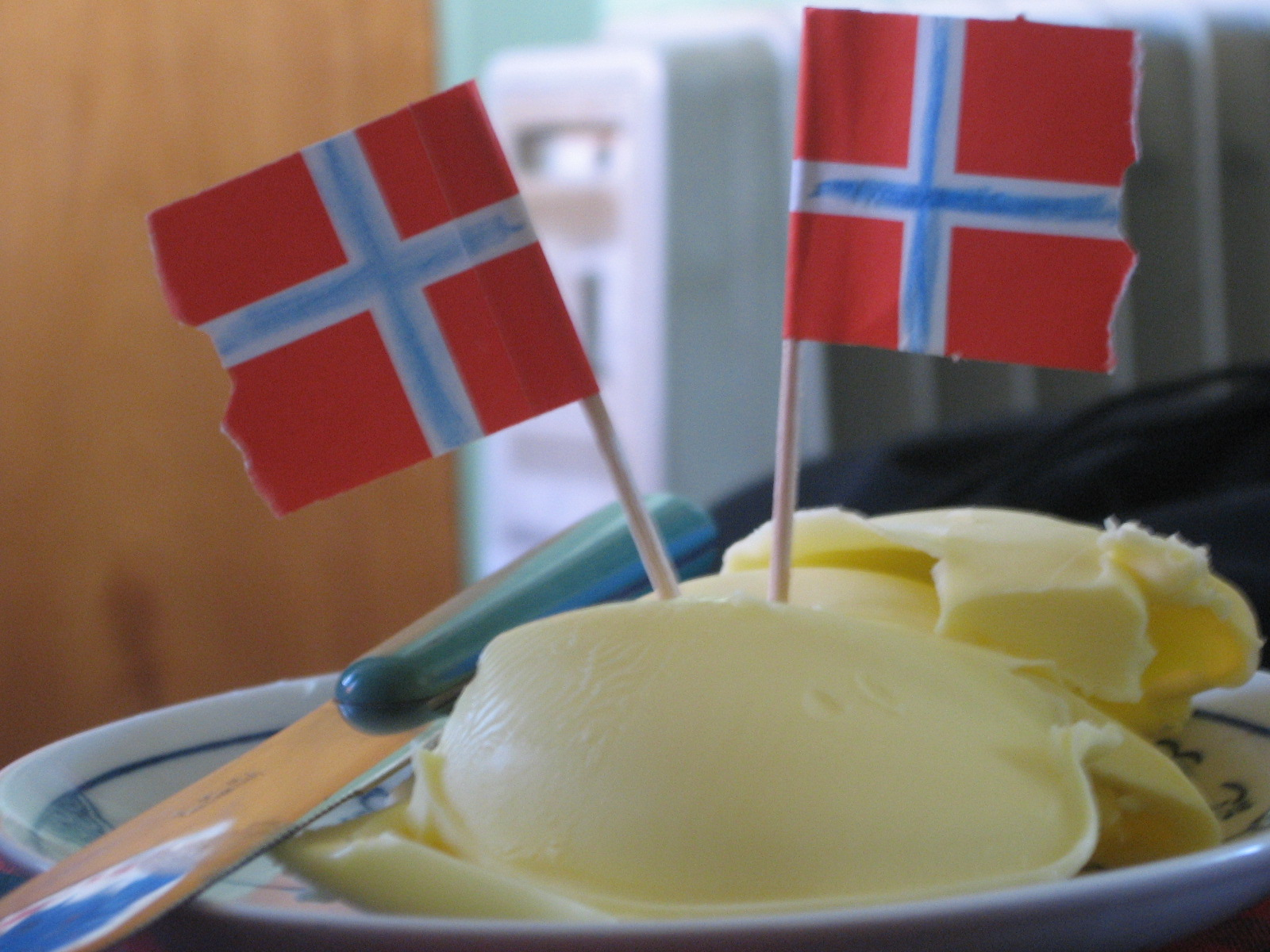
A plate of Norwegian butter served as a spread on Norwegian Constitution Day

The Norwegian butter crisis began in late 2011, around November, with an acute shortage of butter and inflation of its price across markets in Norway. The shortage caused soaring prices, and stores' stocks of butter ran out within minutes of deliveries. According to the Danish tabloid B.T., Norway was experiencing "smør-panik" ("butter panic") as a result of the butter shortage.

== Shortage ==
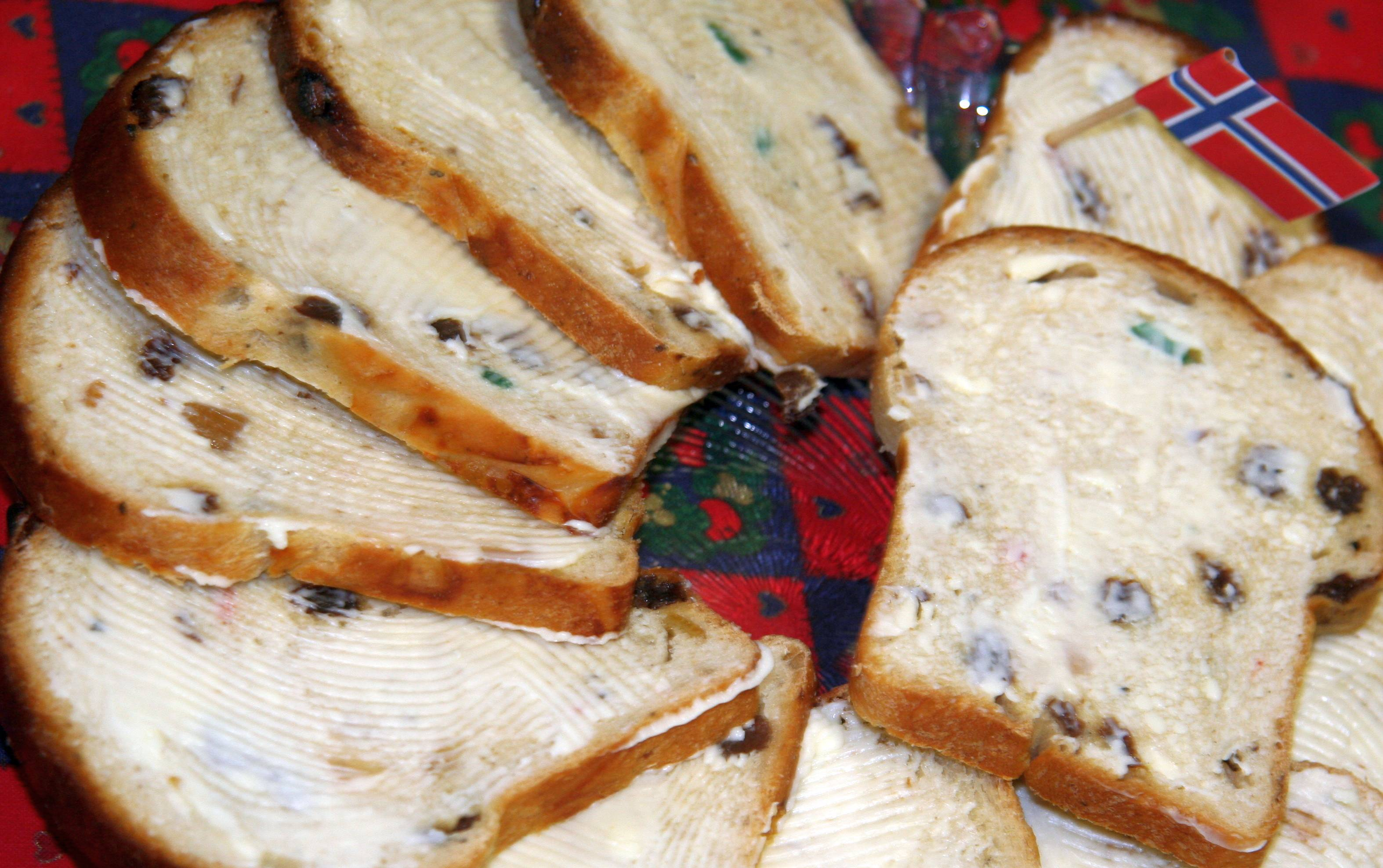
Norwegian traditional Christmas sweet bread called julebrød or julekake ("Christmas bread/cake") sliced and spread with butter. Butter is a common ingredient in Norwegian Christmas fare, and prices were at their highest in December 2011.

Heavy rains during the summer affected the grazing of cows and reduced milk production during the summer months by about 20 million litres (5.3 million US gallons), which led to increased butter prices. At the same time, demand increased rapidly – a 20 percent increase in sales in October 2011, with a further 30 percent rise in November. An acute shortage resulted in prices soaring. A single 250 g (8.8 oz) pack of imported Lurpak butter cost NOK 300 (€39; £32; $50) by mid-December 2011. For Norwegians, butter forms a staple part of the Christmas diet, and is particularly popular as part of a fat-rich, low-carbohydrate diet.

Shortages persisted as a result of high import tariffs on butter to protect the domestic dairy industry against foreign competition, which meant that 90 percent of the butter on sale in Norway was produced domestically. The dairy industry estimated a deficit of 500 to 1,000 tonnes, while the demand for butter had increased by 30 percent since 2010. Tine, which produced 90 percent of Norwegian butter at the time and was both the largest dairy cooperative in the country and the market regulator, was blamed by dairy farmers for not informing them about higher demand quotas and exporting too much butter despite a looming domestic shortage.

== Response ==
In response to growing criticism, Tine asked the government to reduce tariffs to allow demand to be met with cheaper imports from neighbouring countries. The government responded by cutting the import duty by 80 percent to NOK 4 (€0.51; £0.43; $0.66) per kilogram, from NOK 25 (€3.22; £2.69; $4.18). However, according to a Tine spokesman, the move was unlikely to result in supplies of butter becoming available in large quantities until January 2012. There were calls for the Norwegian state monopoly to be reformed as a result of the butter crisis. The dairy industry's structure was created after the Second World War to keep prices high to protect small farms, but according to critics, it is a de facto monopoly that failed to meet the needs of consumers.

The crisis prompted a variety of responses from individuals and organizations in Norway and neighbouring countries. A Norwegian newspaper sought to attract new subscribers by offering them a half kilogram of butter, while students auctioned butter on the Internet in a bid to raise funds for graduation parties. A number of individuals were apprehended by the authorities for attempting to smuggle butter across the border, while Swedes posted online adverts offering to drive butter to Norwegians at prices of up to NOK 460 (€59; £50; $77) per packet. Danish dairy businessman Karl Christian Lund sought to drum up demand for his own butter by handing out thousands of packs in Kristiansand and Oslo, while Swedish supermarkets offered free butter to Norwegian customers to entice them to do their shopping across the border. On the Swedish side of the southeastern border at the Svinesund, stores reported selling twenty times as much butter as normal, with nine out of ten buyers being Norwegians. A Danish television show broadcast an "emergency appeal" for viewers to send butter, and gathered 4,000 packs to be distributed to Norwegians. Danish airports and ferries crossing the straits between the two countries kept a stock of butter in their duty-free stores.

== Aftermath ==
As a result of the butter crisis, Norwegian retailers lost an estimated NOK 43M. The Progress Party has demanded that Tine compensate the retailers for their losses.
