= Labour and Welfare Director =

The Labour and Welfare Director (Norwegian: Arbeids- og velferdsdirektør) is an office (embete) in Norway, created in 2006. The Labour and Welfare Director is the head of the Labour and Welfare Service (including the Labour and Welfare Directorate) as well as the Labour and Welfare Administration (NAV), which comprises both the state Labour and Welfare Service and the municipal labour and welfare offices. The Labour and Welfare Director is appointed by the King-in-Council, effectively by the government. The Director is responsible for one third of the state budget of Norway and 19,000 employees (including 14,000 state employees). It is the only office in Norway to be responsible for both state and municipal services. The incumbent Labour and Welfare Director is Joakim Lystad.

== Labour and Welfare Directors ==
- Tor Saglie 2006–2011
- Joakim Lystad 2011–
