= Norwegian Labour and Welfare Administration =

Public welfare agency of Norway

Nav
- Arbeids- og velferdsforvaltningen
- Nav logo

Agency overview
- Formed: 1 July 2006
- Preceding agencies: Aetat; Trygdeetaten
- Jurisdiction: Norway
- Headquarters: Oslo
- Employees: 15 500 (state level); 6 500 (municipal level); 22 000 (total)
- Agency executive: Eve Vangsnes Bergli, Director of Labor and Welfare
- Parent department: Labour and Welfare Service
- Parent agency: Ministry of Labour and Social Inclusion
- Website: www.nav.no

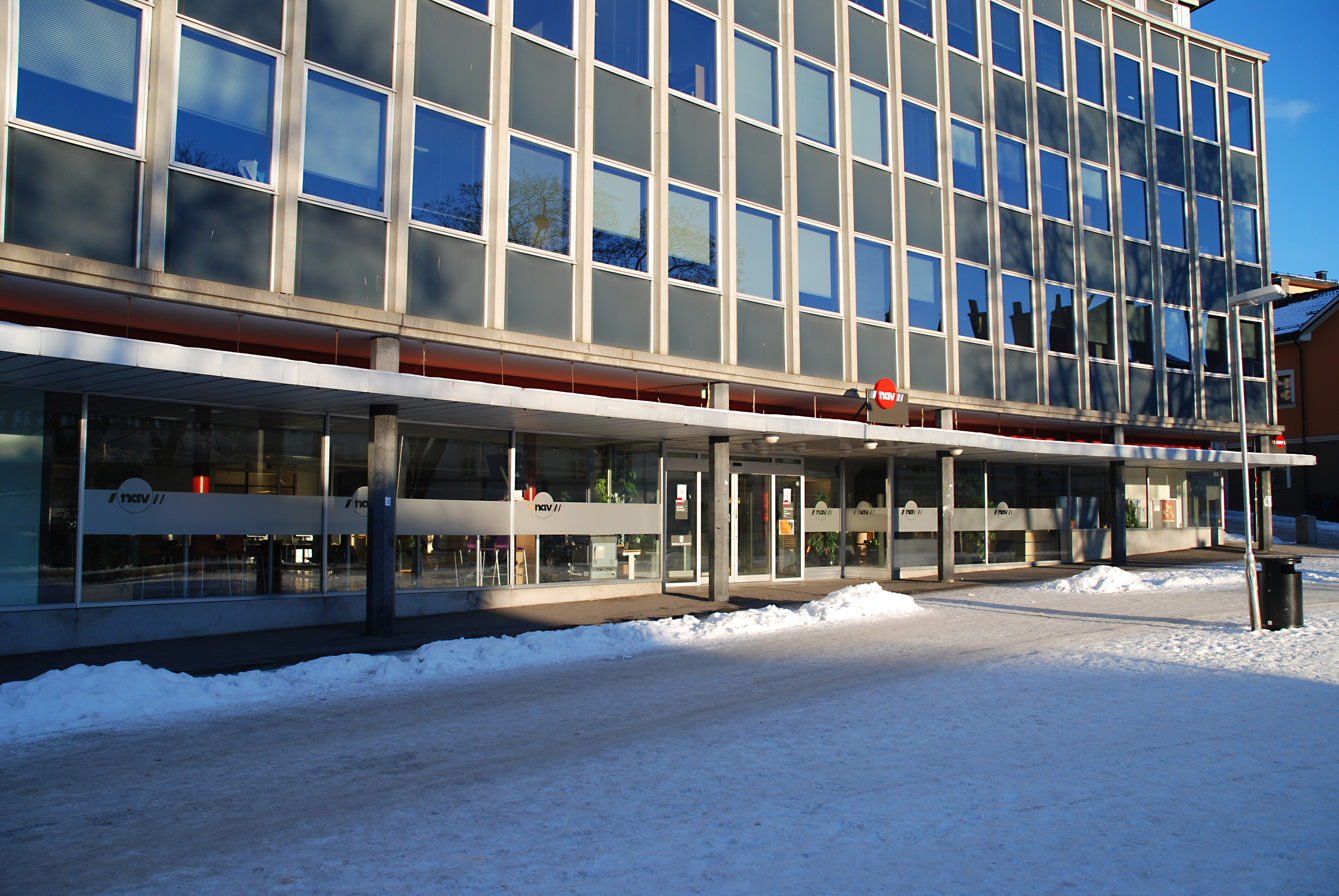
The NAV offices of Hamar

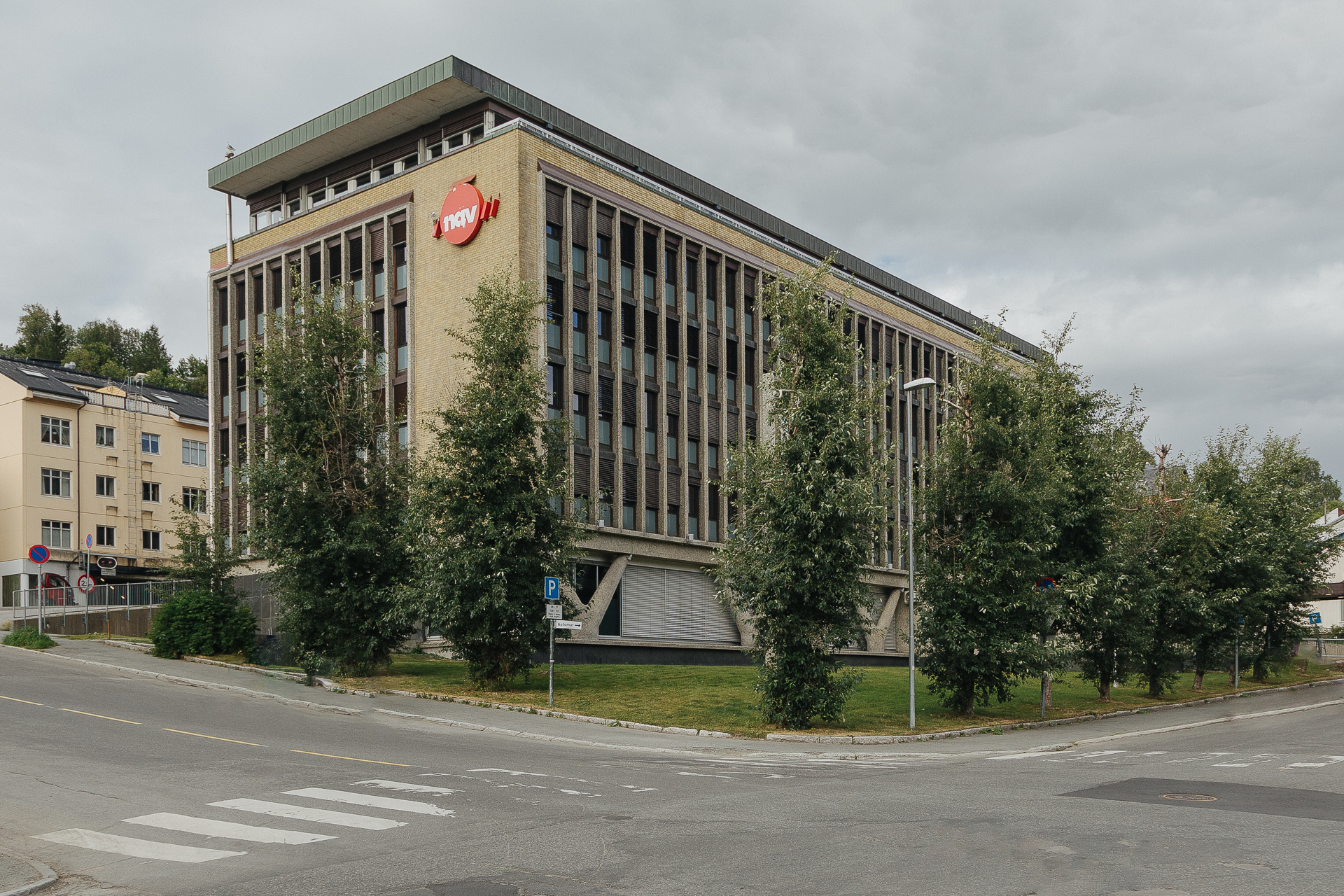
The NAV office in Tromsø

The Norwegian Labour and Welfare Administration (Arbeids- og velferdsforvaltningen; Nav, originally an abbreviation for Ny arbeids- og velferdsforvaltning; New Labour and Welfare Management) is the current Norwegian public welfare agency, which consists of the state Labour and Welfare Service as well as municipal welfare agencies. It is responsible for a third of the state budget of Norway, administering programs such as unemployment benefits, sickness benefits, pensions, child benefits, qualification programme, temporary accommodation, health services, and more. In 2022 the agency had approximately 22,000 employees including approximately 15,500 employed by the state, and approximately 6,500 employed by the municipalities. Its head is the Labour and Welfare Director, currently Hans Christian Holte, who is appointed by the government.

Holte was fired in 2025 due to misinforming the government and Riksrevisjonen, and Eve Vangsnes Bergli took over as acting chief executive.

== History ==
NAV was established as a result of the Norwegian Labour and Welfare Act of 2006. The newly established agency is a collaboration between the Norwegian Labour and Welfare Service (Norwegian: Arbeids- og velferdsetaten) and certain parts of the municipal social services. "NAV" was originally an acronym for "New Labour and Welfare Administration" (Norwegian: Ny arbeids- og velferdsforvalting) but is now seen as a word of its own.

The aim of the NAV reform is to gather all the social security and employment offices to a common state agency where the employees of the Labour and Welfare Service and the municipal social services would work together to find solutions for unemployed people. The reform was adopted by the Parliament of Norway in the spring of 2005, and the social security agency National Insurance Service and employment agency Aetat was formally dismantled in July 2006 as the new Labour and Welfare Agency was established.

== Unemployment benefits ==
Norway has an unemployment rate of 2.9% in 2022, one of the lowest in Europe, only below Czech Republic with 2.3% and Poland with 2.6 percent. The duration of the unemployment benefit from NAV depends on person's income for the last 36 months. Depending on the income, the unemployment benefit period can be up to 104 weeks (income above 237,240 NOK) or up to 52 weeks. Unemployment benefit is paid every 14 days. The maximum unemployment benefit you can get is 62.4% of your past income up to 711,720 NOK. It is slightly above the average value for OECD countries with the lowest benefits of 39% in Greece, and highest benefits of 94% in Denmark. A person can apply for unemployment benefit from NAV if he lost over 50% of the total working hours, lost his income, had an income of over 177,930 NOK in the last 12 months or over 355,860 NOK in the last 36 months, and under the age of 67.

== The agency's name as a verb ==
Media have reported the existence of the verb "nave", which can be defined as a person taking a one-year holiday from one's (process of acquisition of) formal education, while expecting that the agency will pay for the holiday. The word was named Word of the year in Norway in 2012 by the Language Council of Norway.
