= Randi Bjørgen =

Norwegian trade unionist

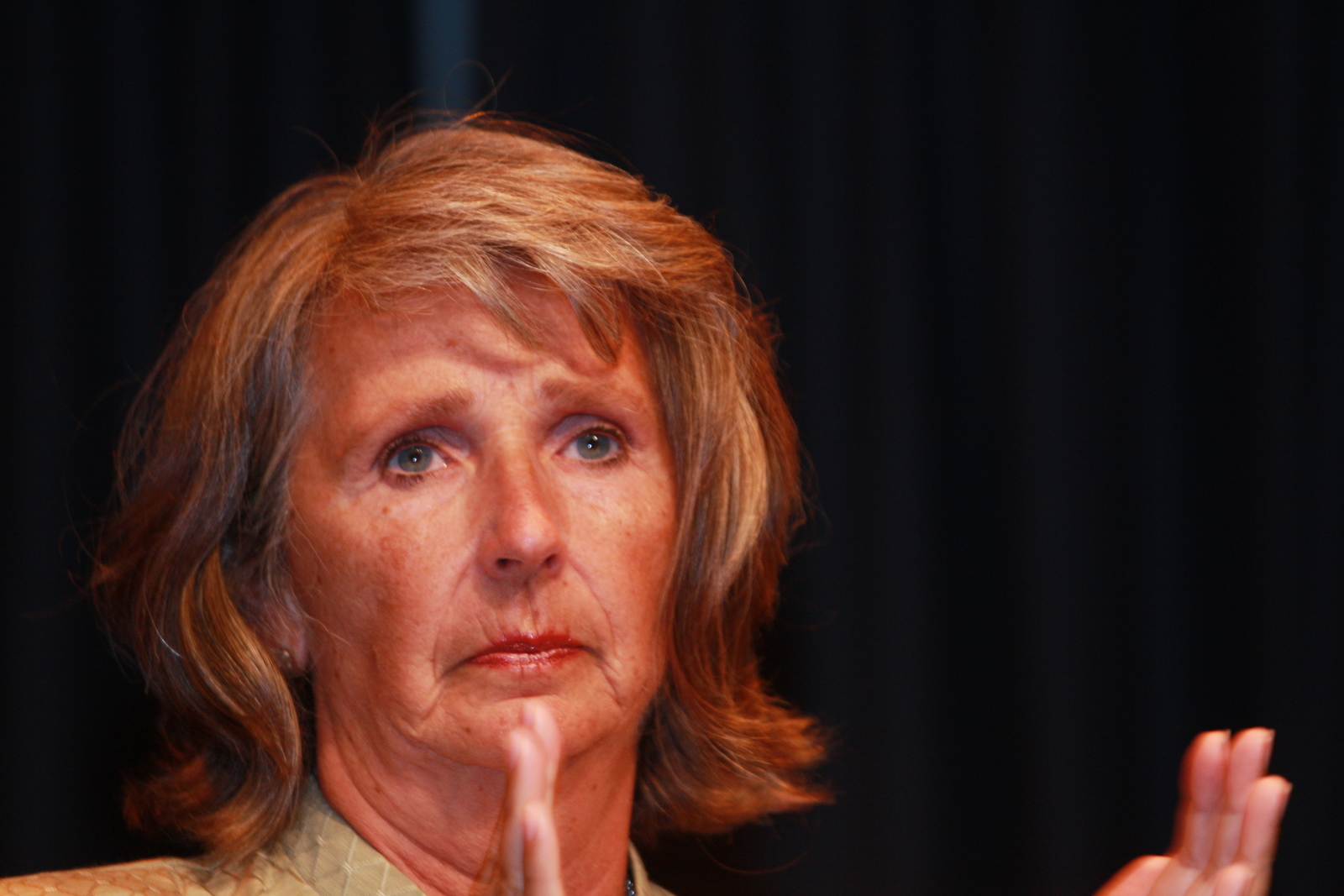
Randi Bjørgen in 2010

Randi Bjørgen (born 27 June 1947) is a Norwegian trade unionist.

A biological engineer by profession, she led the Kommunale Funksjonærers Landsforbund from 1987 to 1996, and from 1996 to 2006 she led the Confederation of Vocational Unions.

Business positions
Preceded by Eva Bjøreng	Leader of the Confederation of Vocational Unions; 1996–2006	Succeeded by Tore Eugen Kvalheim
