= Norwegian Hospitality Association =

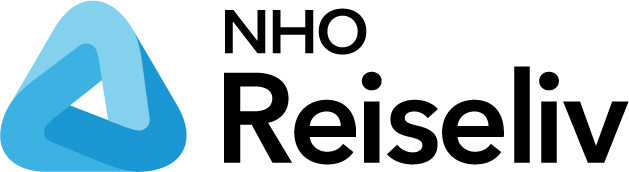

The Norwegian Hospitality Association (Norwegian: NHO Reiseliv) is an employers' organisation in Norway, organized under the national Confederation of Norwegian Enterprise.

The CEO is Kristin Krohn Devold and the Chairman of the board is Ole Warberg.

The Norwegian Hospitality Association is a member organization consisting of hotels and other accommodation, restaurants, catering and other food service businesses. Members also include campsites, family amusement parks, alpine facilities and other attractions. Member businesses make their living offering experiences ranging from lodging to rafting: in short, anything in the area of tourism.

The Norwegian Hospitality Association has 2500 member businesses with a total of 55,000 employees and annual turnover nearing NOK 30 billion. The organization covers the entire country, has seven district offices and is one of the three largest national associations in the Confederation of Norwegian Enterprise (NHO). The affiliation with the Confederation of Norwegian Enterprise enables the Norwegian Hospitality Association to benefit from the organization's extensive resources. The Norwegian Hospitality Association desires to participate actively in the shaping of Norwegian industrial policy and seeks to influence decisions that public bodies take nationally or locally. Its overarching aim is to create enhanced profitability for its member businesses.

The Norwegian Hospitality Association is a party to wage negotiations, at the same time as it has extensive expertise in wage and employer issues. Member businesses also have the advantage of such services as the Norwegian Hospitality Association's Service Office. Co-operation agreements for purchasing from a number of major suppliers to the industry make considerable savings for member businesses.

In 2005, hospitality businesses contributed NOK 80 billion to GNP. Lodging and food service comprise 10,759 businesses that have NOK 52 billion in sales and employ 88,975 persons, which constitutes 4.1 percent of the total employment in Norway.
