= Ministry of Government Administration, Reform and Church Affairs =

Government ministry of Norway

Royal Ministry of Government Administration, Reform and Church Affairs
- Fornyings-, administrasjons- og kirkedepartementet

Agency overview
- Formed: 1 January 2005
- Preceding agency: Ministry of Labour and Government Administration
- Dissolved: 31 December 2013
- Superseding agency: Ministry of Local Government and Modernisation
- Jurisdiction: Government of Norway
- Headquarters: Regjeringskvartalet; Akersgata 59, Oslo, Norway; 59°54′55″N 10°44′43″E

The Royal Norwegian Ministry of Government Administration, Reform and Church Affairs (Norwegian: Fornyings-, administrasjons- og kirkedepartementet, FAD) was a Norwegian ministry.

It was established as the Ministry of Modernisation on 1 January 2005, succeeding the portfolio of the Ministry of Labour and Government Administration. The ministry's nomenclature changed into Ministry of Government Administration and Reform in January 2006 by Stoltenberg's Second Cabinet.Heidi Grande Røys was assigned as the minister of this ministry.

It took its final nomenclature on 1 January 2010. At the same time, the ministry was given responsibility for church matters that were transferred from the Ministry of Culture and Church Affairs, and Sami and minority policy matters that previously fell under the Ministry of Labour and Social Inclusion.

When Solberg's cabinet assumed office in October 2013, Jan Tore Sanner took over the ministry, pending its discontinuation from 2014. On 1 January 2014, it was absorbed into the Ministry of Local Government and Modernisation.

The ministry was responsible for reform work, information technology, competition policy in addition to having the main responsibility for government employees and government organisation. The department must report to the legislature – the Storting.

== Organisation ==
The ministry was divided into the following sections:

- Political staff
- Information Unit
- Department of Employer Policy
- Department of Competition Policy
- Department of Government Services
- Economics and Economic Analysis Unit

=== Subsidiaries ===
The following government agencies were subordinate to the ministry:

- Norwegian Data Inspectorate
- Government Administration Services
- Government County Governor
- Norwegian Competition Authority
- Norge.no
- Personvernnemda
- Norwegian Public Service Pension Fund
- Statsbygg
- Statskonsult (limited company)

== See also ==
- MinID
