= Labour and Welfare Service =

The Labour and Welfare Service (Norwegian: Arbeids- og velferdsetaten) is a government agency of Norway. Together with municipal welfare agencies, it makes up the Norwegian Labour and Welfare Administration (NAV). The Labour and Welfare Service (as well as the Norwegian Labour and Welfare Administration as a whole) is led by Labour and Welfare Directorate, a government directorate located in Oslo. Its head is the Labour and Welfare Director, currently Joakim Lystad. The Labour and Welfare Service has 14,000 employees, whereas the Norwegian Labour and Welfare Administration as a whole has 19,000 employees. The service is subordinate to the Ministry of Labour and Social Inclusion.
