= Norwegian Association of Local and Regional Authorities =

Coat of arms

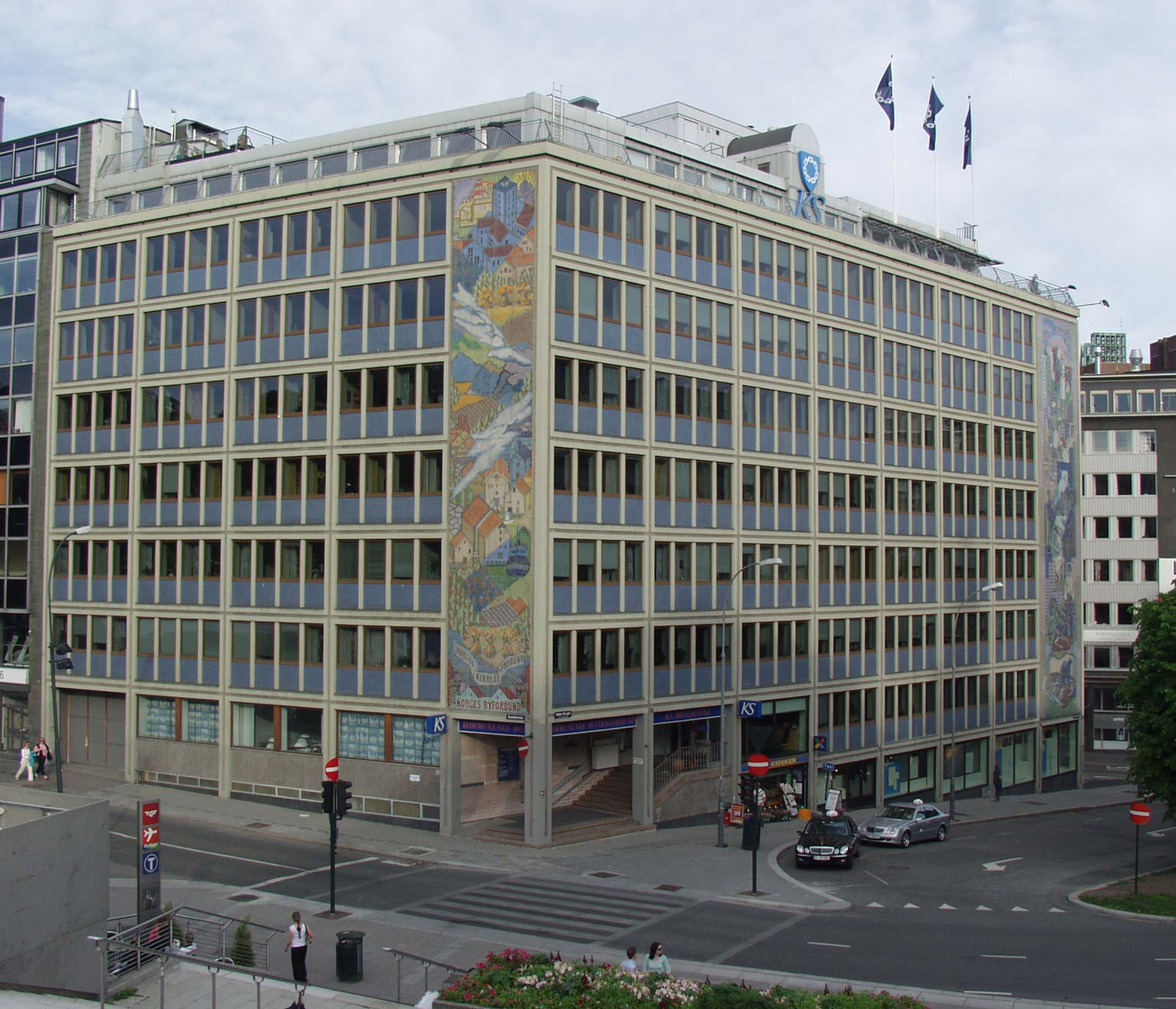
Headquarters, designed by F. S. Platou

The Norwegian Association of Local and Regional Authorities (Norwegian: KS) is an employers' organisation in Norway.

It was founded in 1972 as a merger between the Union of Norwegian Cities (Norges Byforbund, founded in 1903) and the Norwegian Association of Rural Municipalities (Norges Herredsforbund, founded in 1923). The two entities were also merged between 1942 and 1945, during the German occupation of Norway. It changed its name from Norske Kommuners Sentralforbund to Kommunenes Sentralforbund in 1988, and to just KS in 2004.

The current director general is Gunn Marit Helgesen. KS President Gunn Marit Helgesen was re-elected at the KS congress February 17, together with deputies Mette Gundersen and Bjørn Arild Gram. Ms. Helgesen has been the KS President since 2012 and member of the executive board since 2008.
