= Statskonsult =

Statskonsult AS
- Type: State owned
- Industry: Management consulting
- Founded: 1947
- Headquarters: Oslo, Norway
- Area served: Norway
- Key people: Gunnar Bakkeland (CEO); Kari Gjesteby (Chairman)
- Revenue: NOK 52.0 million (2006)
- Operating income: NOK -15.9 million (2006)
- Owner: Norwegian Ministry of Government Administration and Reform

Statskonsult AS is a defunct Norwegian government-owned company that provided management consulting services related to government restructuring and reform. It was created in 1947 as the Rationalisation Office (Norwegian: Rasjonaliseringskontoret), later the Directorate of Rationalisation. The name Statskonsult was taken into use in 1987. It was converted to a limited company on January 1, 2004, owned by the Norwegian Ministry of Government Administration and Reform with the intention of competing with other consulting companies within three years, but the change of government after the 2005 elections changed the plans. It merged with Norge.no and the Norwegian eProcurement Secretariat on July 1, 2007, to form the Agency for Public Management and eGovernment.

Statskonsult has worked in Macedonia since 2004. The aim of Statskonsult's projects in Macedonia is to strengthen the administration's ability to adapt to future EU membership.
