= Norwegian Tax Administration =

Norwegian government agency

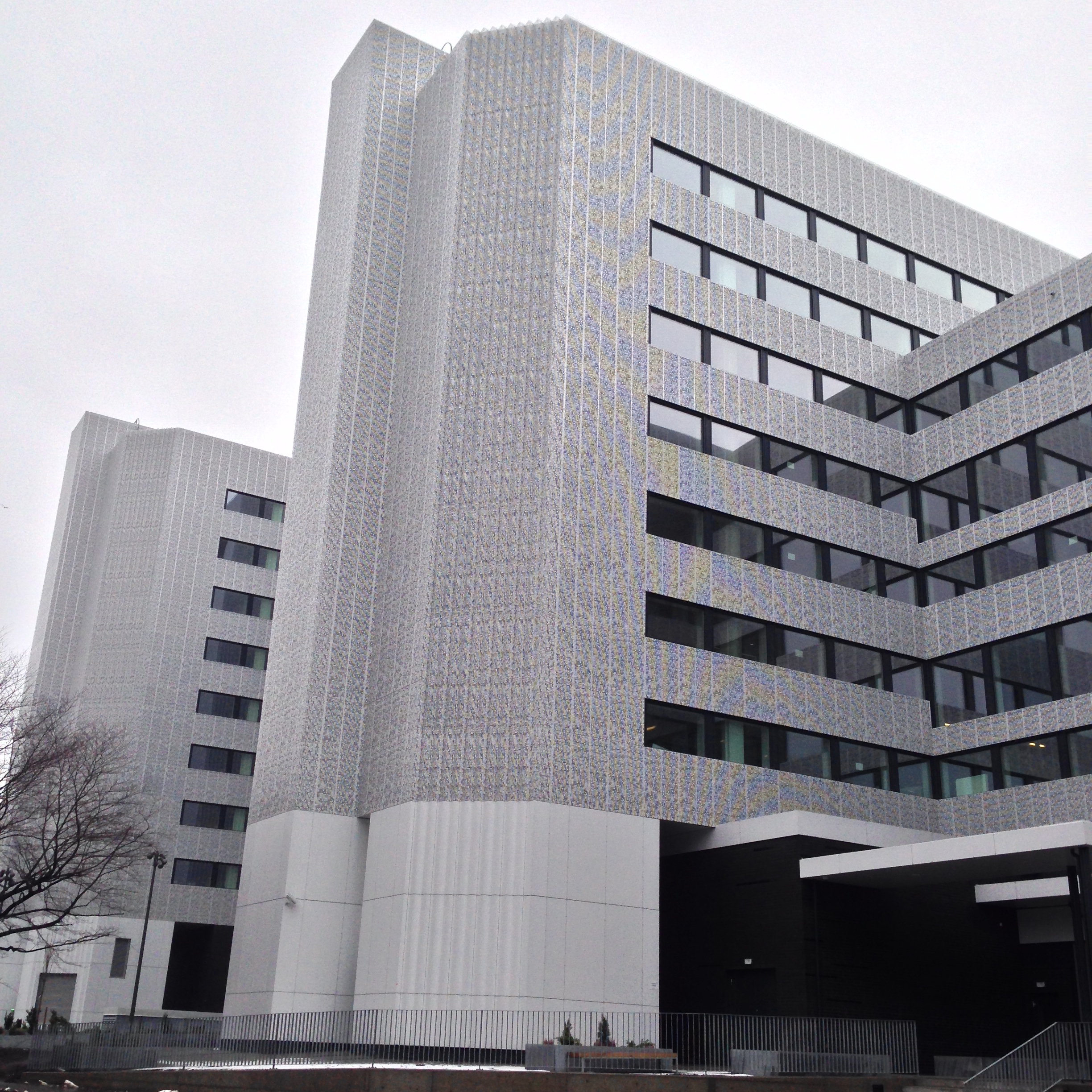
Head office

The Norwegian Tax Administration (Norwegian: Skatteetaten) is a government agency responsible for resident registration (National Population Register) and tax collection in Norway. The agency is subordinate to the Ministry of Finance and is based at Helsfyr in Oslo. It is organized in six regional organizations, based in Oslo, Skien, Bergen, Trondheim, Mo i Rana and Tromsø, in addition to local tax offices.
