= Hambro =

Hambro is a Danish and Norwegian surname. Notable people with the surname include:

- Calmer Hambro (1747–1806), Danish merchant and banker
- Carl Joachim Hambro (1807–1877), Danish banker and founder of Hambros Bank
- C. J. Hambro (1885–1964), Norwegian author, journalist, and politician
- Charles Hambro, Baron Hambro (1930–2002), English banker and politician
- Charles Jocelyn Hambro (1897–1963), Danish–English merchant banker and intelligence officer
- Charles J. T. Hambro (1834–1891), Danish–English politician
- Christian Hambro (born 1946), Norwegian civil servant
- Edvard Hambro (1911–1977), Norwegian politician
- Ellen Hambro (born 1964), Norwegian civil servant
- Eric Hambro (1872–1947), English banker and politician
- Everard Hambro (1842–1925), English banker and philanthropist
- James Hambro (born 1949), English banker, businessman, and philanthropist
- Jay Hambro, British businessman
- Jocelyn Hambro (1919–1994), English merchant banker and philanthropist
- Johan Hambro (1915–1993), Norwegian journalist
- Joseph Hambro (1780–1840), Danish banker and political advisor
- Lenny Hambro (1923–1995), American musician
- Leonid Hambro (1920–2006), American concert pianist and composer
- Nicoline Hambro (1861–1926), Norwegian politician
- Peter Hambro (born 1945), English businessman
- Richard Hambro (1946–2009), English investment banker and philanthropist
- Rupert Hambro (1943–2021), English banker, businessman, and philanthropist
- Tatiana Hambro (born 1989), English fashion writer and editor
