= Olaf Hambro =

British merchant banker (1885–1961)

- Born: 1 December 1885; Hayes, Kent, England
- Died: 25 April 1961 (aged 75)
- Education: Eton College; Trinity College, Cambridge
- Occupation: Banker
- Spouse: Winifred Emily Ridley-Smith
- Children: 3 sons
- Parent(s): Everard Hambro; Gertrude Mary Stuart
- Relatives: Calmer Hambro (great-great-grandfather); Joseph Hambro (great-grandfather); Carl Joachim Hambro (grandfather); Rupert Hambro (grandson); Richard Hambro (grandson); James Hambro (grandson)

Captain Ronald Olaf Hambro (1 December 1885 – 25 April 1961) was a British merchant banker. He was chairman of Hambros Bank from 1932 to 1961.

== Early life ==
Hambro was born on 1 December 1885. His paternal grandfather, Carl Joachim Hambro, was a Danish immigrant who founded the Hambros Bank in London in 1839. His paternal great-grandfather, Joseph Hambro, was a Danish banker and political advisor. His paternal great-great-grandfather, Calmer Hambro, was a Danish merchant and banker.

He was educated at Eton College. He attended Trinity College, Cambridge. During World War I, he served as a captain in the Coldstream Guards.

== Career ==
Hambro started his career as managing director at the family business, Hambros Bank, in 1921. He served as its chairman from 1932 to 1961.

He acquired Wiltons, a fine restaurant located at 55 Jermyn Street in London, during World War II.

He was appointed High Sheriff of Sussex in 1930.

== Personal life ==
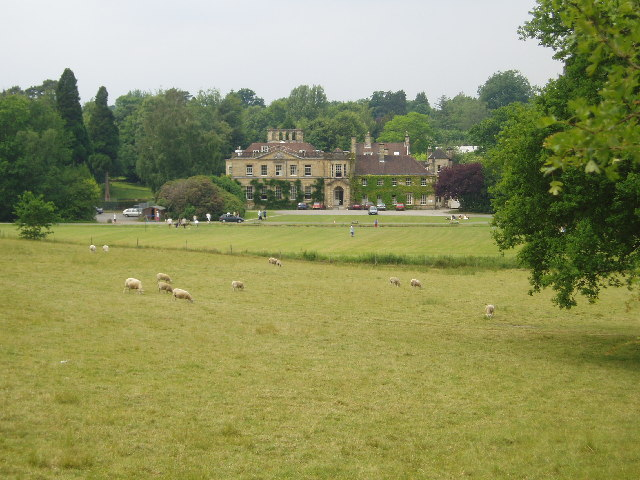
Kidbrooke Park.

He married Winifred Emily Ridley-Smith on 17 February 1917. They resided at Kidbrooke Park in Forest Row, East Sussex and owned a house in Port Logan, Wigtownshire, Scotland. They had three children:

- Jocelyn Olaf Hambro.
- Simon Everard Hambro.
- Anthony Martin Hambro.

== Death ==
He died on 25 April 1961.
