= Jay Hambro =

British businessman in the mining, energy, steel

- Education: Harrow School; Newcastle University
- Occupation: Businessman
- Title: Founder of Verdigris Strategic
- Parent: Peter Hambro

Jay Hambro is a British businessman in the mining, energy, steel and commodity sectors. He is the founder of Verdigris Strategic, a long-term investor and business transformation specialist.

== Early life ==
Hambro is a member of the Danish Hambro merchant banking family, and the son of Peter Hambro, co-founder of Petropavlovsk plc. He was educated at Harrow School, followed by a bachelor's degree in business administration from Newcastle University.

== Career ==
Hambro began his career in the resource finance team at N M Rothschild & Sons.

He was chief executive officer (CEO) of Aricom between 2006 and 2009, and subsequently chief information officer of Petropavlovsk plc – the FTSE listed gold and iron ore miner. Hambro business development director of Petropavlovsk, which became the second largest gold producer in Russia, having started out as a junior exploration company in 1994. Prior to joining, Hambro was a manager of the metals & mining corporate finance team within HSBC. Hambro was also a director of Winsway Coking Coal and Cellmark AB.

Until July 2021 he was the chief investment officer of the GFG Alliance, leader of the SIMEC Group for mining and energy, non-executive director of Wyelands Capital and non-executive chairman of IRC Limited. Hambro worked with the GFG Alliance on an acquisition, investment and development programme in UK industry with a focus on metals and energy.

In July 2021, Hambro left GFG after a disagreement about the sale of Alvance, a Franco-Belgian aluminium company.

== Professional memberships ==
Hambro is a Fellow of the Institute of Materials, Minerals and Mining. He was included in Grant Thornton's "Faces of a Vibrant Economy". He won the Rising Star Individual Award in the 2020 Platts Global Metals Awards.
