= Richard Hambro =

British heir, investment banker, horse breeder & philanthropist (1946-2009)

- Born: Richard Alexander Hambro; 1 October 1946
- Died: 25 April 2009 (aged 62)
- Education: Eton College; LMU Munich
- Occupations: Investment banker, horsebreeder
- Spouses: Charlotte Soames (m. 1973; div. 1982) Juliet Grana (m. 1984; div. 1992) Mary Hambro (m. 1993)
- Children: 1
- Parents: Jocelyn Hambro; Ann Silvia Muir
- Relatives: Carl Joachim Hambro (great-grandfather); Olaf Hambro (grandfather); Rupert Hambro (brother); James Hambro (brother)

Richard Alexander Hambro (1 October 1946 – 25 April 2009) was a British heir, investment banker, horse breeder and philanthropist.

== Early life ==
Richard Hambro was born on 1 October 1946. His father, Jocelyn Hambro, served as the chairman of Hambros Bank from 1965 to 1972. His mother was Ann Silvia Muir. His paternal great-grandfather, Carl Joachim Hambro, was a Danish emigrant to England who founded the Hambro Bank.

He was educated at Eton College and later graduated from LMU Munich in Germany.

== Career ==
Hambro started his career in South Africa and later worked in Italy. He then served as the president of Hambro America in the United States from 1976 to 1982. In 1986, Hambro played a significant role in selling the family's stake in Hambro's bank, before the bank was sold to Société Générale in 1998 for approximately £300m.

He co-founded J.O. Hambro Capital Management, a mergers and acquisitions financial firm, with his father and two brothers in 1986. He also founded J. O. Hambro Investment Management, which he sold to Credit Suisse in 2000 for USD$124 million. At the time it had 650 clients and managed £1.5 billion worth of assets. Hambro served as its chairman until his death in 2009, even after it was a subsidiary of Credit Suisse. It is now owned by Somers Limited and called Waverton Investment Management, named after the Hambro family home located in Gloucestershire.

Hambro also owned Wiltons, a seafood restaurant on Jermyn Street, which still belongs to the family, as well as Franco's.

He was the founder of Money Portal, a financial advisory firm, where he served as chairman from 2003 until 2009. He also served as the chairman of I. Hennig & Co., the diamond broker for De Beers, from 1987 until his death.

Hambro ran for the parliamentary seat of Rotherham in the October 1974 general election as the Conservative Party candidate. He was defeated by incumbent Labour Member of Parliament Brian O'Malley.

== Philanthropy ==
Hambro served as the treasurer of Macmillan Cancer Support from 1983 to 1991, and as the chairman of its board of trustees from 1991 to 2001. During his time at the charity, the annual income grew from £3.5 million in 1983 to over £80 million by 2001. The Richard Hambro Award is named in his honour. He also served on the boards of trustees of Colon Cancer Concern and Bowel Cancer UK, the board of governors of the London Clinic, and the board of directors of the Institute of Cancer Research.

He served as the chairman of the South African National Business Initiative in 1995, which was renamed the same year to the National Business Initiative. He made charitable contributions to St Paul's Cathedral and served as director of the board at the Garden Museum.

== Equestrianism ==
Hambro was a steward at the Sandown Park Racecourse and Ascot Racecourse. He became a member of the Jockey Club in 1997. He served as the chairman of the Newmarket Racecourse from 2004 to 2009.

After he inherited his late father's house, Waverton, in Moreton-in-Marsh, Gloucestershire in 1995, he bred racehorses. Some of his best racehorses were Presenting and Beechy Bank. At Warwick in 2002 the four-year-old Beechy Bank won with odds of 200-1, becoming one of the longest priced winners in British racing, though Hambro did not receive a payout as he did not bet on the horse at the time.

== Personal life ==
Hambro was married three times. He was first married to Charlotte Soames, the daughter of Christopher Soames, Baron Soames and Mary Soames, Baroness Soames, from 1973 to 1982. Their daughter, Clementine Hambro, was bridesmaid at the wedding of Prince Charles and Diana, Princess of Wales, in 1981. She later married Orlando Fraser, the son of Tory MP Hugh Fraser and Lady Antonia Fraser, in 2006.

He was married to Juliet Grana (née Harvey) from 1984 to 1992. In 1993, he married his third wife, Mary, who was a horse breeder.

== Death ==
Hambro died on 25 April 2009 at the age of sixty-two.
