= Aricom =

British ore mining company

Aricom plc
- Type: Public limited company
- Industry: Mining; Metallurgy
- Founded: 2003; 23 years ago
- Defunct: April 2008
- Fate: Shares acquired by Peter Hambro Mining
- Key people: Pavel Maslovskiy (Chairman); Jay Hambro (Chief executive officer)
- Products: Iron ore; Ilmenite
- Revenue: $9.7 million (2008)
- Operating income: $413.3 million (2008)
- Net income: $426.6 million (2008)

Aricom PLC (Russian: Ариком) was an iron ore mining company with operations in Russia and listed on the London Stock Exchange. The firm was effectively founded as a spin out from Peter Hambro Mining in 2003, listing on the London Stock Exchange and later becoming a member of the FTSE 250. Aricom was reacquired by Peter Hambro Mining (now known as Petropavlovsk PLC) in April 2009. In October 2010, the assets previously held by Aricom were listed as IRC Ltd on the Hong Kong Stock Exchange, with Petropavlovsk PLC retaining a majority shareholding.

== History ==
Aricom was founded in 2003 when it was listed on the Alternative Investment Market and acquired a 74% stake in Olekminsky Rudnik, a business which owned the license to mine the Kuranakh deposit, from Peter Hambro Mining. In 2007 the Company obtained a listing on the main market of the London Stock Exchange. Aricom was fully bought over by its sister company Peter Hambro Mining in April 2009. The acquisition coincided with Peter Hambro's move from AIM to the LSE main market, leading to it taking Aricom's place in the FTSE 250 Index. In October 2010, the assets previously held by Aricom were listed as IRC Ltd on the Hong Kong Stock Exchange. Petropavlovsk PLC retains a majority shareholding in IRC Ltd.

== Operations ==
The mining operations formally held by Aricom (and now held by IRC Ltd) are based in the Amur Region and Jewish Autonomous Region of Eastern Russia. The regions offer a wealth of mineral deposits and provide strong infrastructure for the assets: the mines are all within proximity to the Trans-Siberian Railway and BAM Railway.

The mines are all "open pit", which are essentially well planned craters dug into the ground. To excavate the ore, grids of holes are drilled into it and dynamite is then inserted into the holes. This process in known as "blasting" and the blasted ore is then removed from the pit in ore trucks.
