= Rupert Hambro =

British banker and businessman (1943–2021)

- Born: Rupert Nicholas Hambro; 27 June 1943
- Died: 19 February 2021 (aged 77)
- Education: Eton College; Aix-Marseille University
- Occupations: Banker, businessman
- Father: Jocelyn Hambro
- Relatives: Carl Joachim Hambro (paternal great-grandfather); Olaf Hambro (paternal grandfather); Richard Hambro (brother); James Hambro (brother)

Rupert Nicholas Hambro CBE (27 June 1943 – 19 February 2021) was a British banker and businessman.

== Early life ==
Rupert Hambro was born on 27 June 1943. His father, Jocelyn Hambro, was chair of Hambros Bank from 1965 to 1972. His mother was Ann Silvia Muir. His paternal great-grandfather, Carl Joachim Hambro, was a Danish emigrant to England who founded the Hambros Bank.

He was educated at Eton College. He studied at the University of Aix-en-Provence in Aix-en-Provence, France.

== Career ==
Hambro started his career at Peat Marwick Mitchell Co., which later merged with KPMG, from 1962 to 1964.

He joined the family business, Hambros Bank, in 1964. He served on its board of directors from 1969 to 1986, and as its chairman from 1983 to 1986. In 1986, he co-founded J.O. Hambro Capital Management, a mergers and acquisitions investment firm, with his father and two brothers. He was also the owner of the private equity firm, Hambro & Partners.

He was Chairman of Woburn Enterprises, which includes the Woburn Safari Park, the Woburn Abbey, golf courses and hotels. He also served on the Boards of Directors of Anglo American plc, the Telegraph Group and the Sedgwick Group. In 1976, he served on the board of directors of the White Pass and Yukon Corporation Ltd., which owns a railway on the White Pass and Yukon Route in Canada.

He was Chairman of Cazenove & Loyd, a luxury travel agency, from 2003. Additionally, he was Chairman of Theo Fennell PLC and Chairman of Sipsmith from 2009. He served on the Supervisory Board of Bank Gutmann. He also served as the Chairman of Robinson Hambro, a recruitment agency for corporate directors, since 2010.

On 4 November 2013, Hambro incorporated Hambro Perks Ltd. with Dominic Perks and was a director of the company.

He wrote in The Spectator.

According to The Sunday Times Rich List in 2020 his net worth was estimated at £151 million.

He died on 19 February 2021 at the age of 77 after a long illness.

== Philanthropy ==
Hambro was the Treasurer of the National Art Collections Fund from 1991 to 2003. He was the Chairman of the Museum of London Docklands from 1995 to 2008.

He served as the Chairman of The Silver Trust from 1988 and Vice Patron of the Royal British Society of Sculptors from 1997. He served on the Council of the Royal College of Art from 2010, and he was an Honorary Fellow of the University of Bath. Additionally, he served as the Chairman of the Development & Strategy Board of the Zoological Society of London since 2011. He served on the board of trustees of the Wallace Collection.

He served on the advisory board of Open Europe, a think tank which promotes reform within the European Union, from 2006. He was a Knight of the Order of the Falcon of Iceland.

He was appointed CBE in the 2014 Birthday Honours for charitable services.

== Personal life ==
Hambro married Mary Boyer (Robin) in 1970. Robin Hambro is an American-born philanthropist, former London Editor of American Vogue who is on the International Best Dressed List. They have a son, Jonathan, and a daughter, Flora.

He was a member of White's, the Groucho Club and The Walbrook Club in the City of London as well as the Jupiter Island Club in Hobe Sound, Florida.

Coat of arms of Rupert Hambro

Motto
In Deo
