= James Hambro =

British heir, investment banker & philanthropist (born 1949)

- Born: James Daryl Hambro; 22 March 1949 (age 77)
- Education: Eton College; Harvard Business School
- Occupations: Banker; businessman
- Board member of: Chair of Guide Dogs for the Blind Charit
- Father: Jocelyn Hambro
- Relatives: Carl Joachim Hambro (great-grandfather); Olaf Hambro (grandfather); Rupert Hambro (brother); Richard Hambro (brother)

James Daryl Hambro (born 22 March 1949) is a banker, businessman and philanthropist.

== Early life ==
James Hambro was born on 22 March 1949. His father, Jocelyn Hambro, was chair of Hambros Bank from 1965 to 1972. His mother was Ann Silvia Muir. His paternal great-grandfather, Carl Joachim Hambro, was a Danish immigrant to England who founded the Hambros Bank.

He was educated at Eton College. He graduated from the Harvard Business School.

== Career ==
Hambro served as the Executive Director of the family business, Hambros Bank, from 1972 to 1985. He co-founded JO Hambro & Company, JO Hambro Investment Management Ltd (now Waverton Investment Management) Hambro Magan, a mergers and acquisitions boutique sold to Nat West, JO Hambro Capital Management Ltd, an institutional fund management company, now part of Pendal, an Australian fund group . He founded James Hambro & Partners in 2010, and serves as its chairman.

Hambro has served on the board of directors of Primary Health Properties from 1996 to 2015. He was the Chairman of Hansteen Holdings from 2005 to 2017. He is a director of Circle Property PLC and I Hennig & Co.

== Philanthropy ==
Hambro is the former Governor and Deputy Chair of Peabody Trust, Chair of The Henry Smith Charity, and currently Chair of Guide Dogs for the Blind.

== Personal life ==
He married Diana Cherry in 1981. They have three daughters: Rachel, Daisy and Lucy. They reside in Kimberley, Norfolk. He is a member of White's and the Royal West Norfolk Golf Club.
