= Peter Hambro =

British businessman (born 1945)

- Born: Peter Charles Percival Hambro; 18 January 1945 (age 81)
- Education: Eton College; Aix-Marseille University
- Occupation: Businessman
- Spouse: Karen Brodrick
- Children: 3 sons, including Jay Hambro
- Relatives: Percy Hambro (grandfather)

Peter Charles Percival Hambro (born 18 January 1945) is a British businessman who is one of the founders of Petropavlovsk plc, (formerly Peter Hambro Mining), a gold mining business in Russia.

== Early life ==
Peter Hambro was born on 18 January 1945, the son of Lt-Col Everard Bingham Hambro, and grandson of Major-General Sir Percy Hambro. One of his paternal ancestors, Carl Joachim Hambro, was a Danish banker. Hambro was educated at Eton College and Aix-Marseille University.

== Career ==
Hambro initially worked at Spicer & Pegler, an accounting firm. He then briefly worked at Hambros Bank before moving on to Smith St Aubyn, a discount house, where he became a Managing Director in 1973. From 1983 to 1990 he worked at Mocatta & Goldsmid, a bullion house, where he became Deputy Managing Director.

In 1994 with Pavel Maslovskiy, Hambro co-founded Peter Hambro Mining, which was renamed Petropavlovsk plc in 2009. He served as its chairman until June 2017. Petropavlovsk went into administration in July 2022.

== Personal life ==
Hambro married Karen Brodrick in 1968. They have three sons.
