= Eric Hambro =

British politician

Sir Eric Hambro
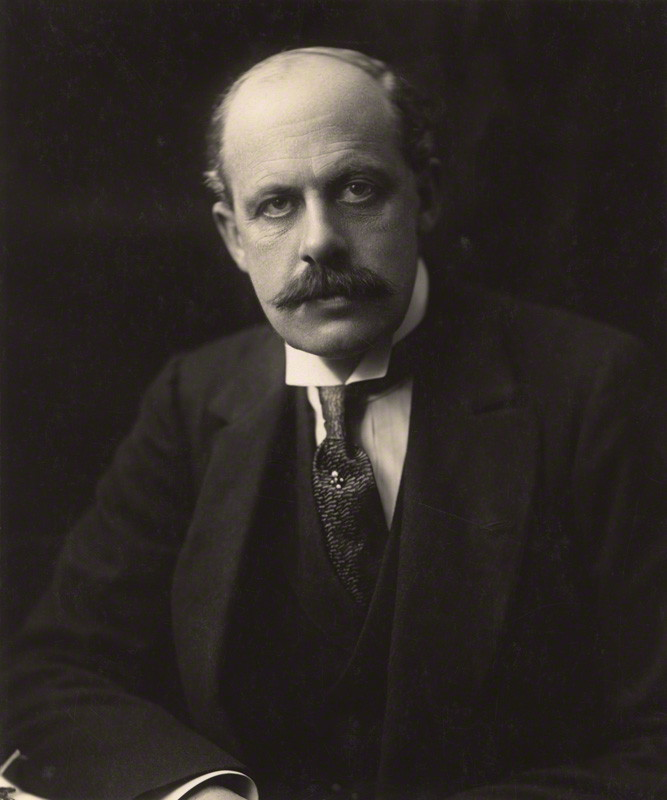
- Sir Eric Hambro in 1910
- Born: Charles Eric Hambro; 30 September 1872; Wandsworth, London, England
- Died: 28 December 1947 (aged 75); Sunninghill, Berkshire, England
- Resting place: St Mary the Virgin, Bromley
- Education: Eton College; Trinity College, Cambridge.
- Occupations: Banker, politician
- Spouses: Sybil Emily Smith (m. 1894; divorced); Estelle Elger (m. 1929)
- Children: 4, including Charles Jocelyn Hambro
- Parent(s): Everard Hambro; Gertrude Mary Stuart

Sir Charles Eric Hambro KBE (30 September 1872 – 28 December 1947) was a British merchant banker and Conservative Party politician.

== Early life ==
Charles Eric Hambro was born on 30 September 1872. He was the eldest son of Sir Everard Hambro, a merchant banker of Milton Abbey, Dorset and Hayes, Kent. He was educated at Eton College and Trinity College, Cambridge.

== Career ==
He became a partner in C.J. Hambro & Son. He rose to become chairman of Hambros Bank. In July 1900, he was selected as the Conservative candidate to contest the constituency of Wimbledon. He was elected unopposed to the House of Commons at the general election held in September 1900. He held the seat at the next general election in 1906, with a majority of 2,114 votes over his Liberal opponent, St. George Lane Fox Pitt.

In April 1907, it was announced that he would be resigning from parliament "on account of additional responsibilities which have been cast upon him in connexion with his business". He formally left parliament on appointment as Steward of the Manor of Northstead on 27 April 1907.

== Knighthood ==
In February 1919, he was appointed a Knight Commander of the Order of the British Empire in recognition of his service at the Ministry of Information during the Great War.

== Personal life ==
He was twice married: to Sybil Emily Smith in 1894, and following a divorce, to Estelle Elger in 1929. He had two sons and two daughters from his first marriage, including Charles Jocelyn Hambro, who later became a senior intelligence officer and a merchant banker.

== Death ==
He died at his home in Sunninghill, Berkshire, aged 75 on 28 December 1947. He is buried at St Mary the Virgin, Bromley (now South London).

Parliament of the United Kingdom
Preceded by Cosmo Bonsor	Member of Parliament for Wimbledon; 1900–1907	Succeeded by Henry Chaplin
