= Norman Park =

Norman Park can refer to:

== Australia ==
- Norman Park, Queensland, a suburb of Brisbane

== United Kingdom ==
- Norman Park, Bromley, a recreation ground near Hayes, Bromley

== United States ==
- Norman Park, Georgia, a city in Colquitt County
