= Orlando Fraser =

British barrister

Orlando Fraser CBE KC
- Born: 1967 (age 58–59)
- Education: University of Cambridge, Inner Temple
- Occupation: Barrister
- Spouse: Clementine Hambro

Orlando Fraser CBE KC (born 1967) is a British barrister who served as chairman of the Charity Commission for England and Wales from 2022 to 2025.

== Early life and education ==
Orlando Fraser was born to the politician Sir Hugh Fraser MBE and the writer Lady Antonia Fraser CH DBE FRSL. His grandfathers were the 14th Lord Lovat and the 7th Earl of Longford.

Fraser attended St Paul's School, London, and Fitzwilliam College, Cambridge.

== Career at the Bar ==
A member of the Inner Temple, Fraser was called to the Bar in 1994.

He was appointed Queen’s Counsel in 2014.

== Other work ==
Fraser served on the board of the Charity Commission from 2013 to 2017. He has also served on the Civil Justice Council and the National Council for Voluntary Organisations’ Advisory Council.

Fraser served as chairman of the Charity Commission from 2022 to 2025. There was some controversy around his appointment.

Fraser was the Conservative Party candidate for North Devon in the 2005 general election. Prior to his appointment as chairman of the Charity Commission, he clarified that he was no longer a mamber of the Conservative Party.

== Personal life ==
Fraser is married to Clementine Hambro, daughter of Richard Hambro and great-granddaughter of Sir Winston Churchill.

One of their residences is Waverton House, a Quinlan Terry country house in Gloucestershire.
