= Malomir mine =

Gold mine in Russia

- Interactive map of Malomir mine
- Location: Amur Oblast, Russia; 53.0598°N 131.7134°E
- Products: gold
- Company: Petropavlovsk plc

The Malomir mine (Russian: Маломырский рудник) is one of the largest gold mines in Russia and in the world. The mine is located in Amur Oblast, 35 km north of the nearest town of Stoyba. The mine has estimated reserves of 13.77 million oz of gold.
