= Hayes, Bromley =

Suburban area of London, England

Coordinates: 51.378°N 0.0192°E

Hayes
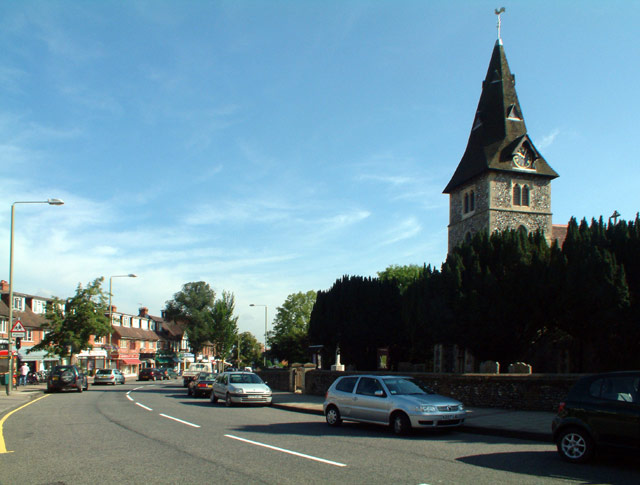

- Location within Greater London
- Population: 15,908 (2021 Census. Hayes and Coney Hall Ward)
- OS grid reference: TQ405665
- London borough: Bromley
- Ceremonial county: Greater London
- Region: London
- Country: England
- Sovereign state: United Kingdom
- Post town: BROMLEY
- Postcode district: BR2
- Dialling code: 020
- Police: Metropolitan
- Fire: London
- Ambulance: London
- UK Parliament: Bromley and Biggin Hill
- London Assembly: Bexley and Bromley

Hayes is a suburban area of southeast London, England and part of the London Borough of Bromley. It is located 11 miles (18 km) south-east of Charing Cross, to the north of Keston and Coney Hall, west of Bromley Common, south of Bromley town centre, and east of West Wickham. An ancient parish in the county of Kent, Hayes was within the Orpington Urban District that became part of Greater London in 1965.

== History ==
=== The Ancient Village ===
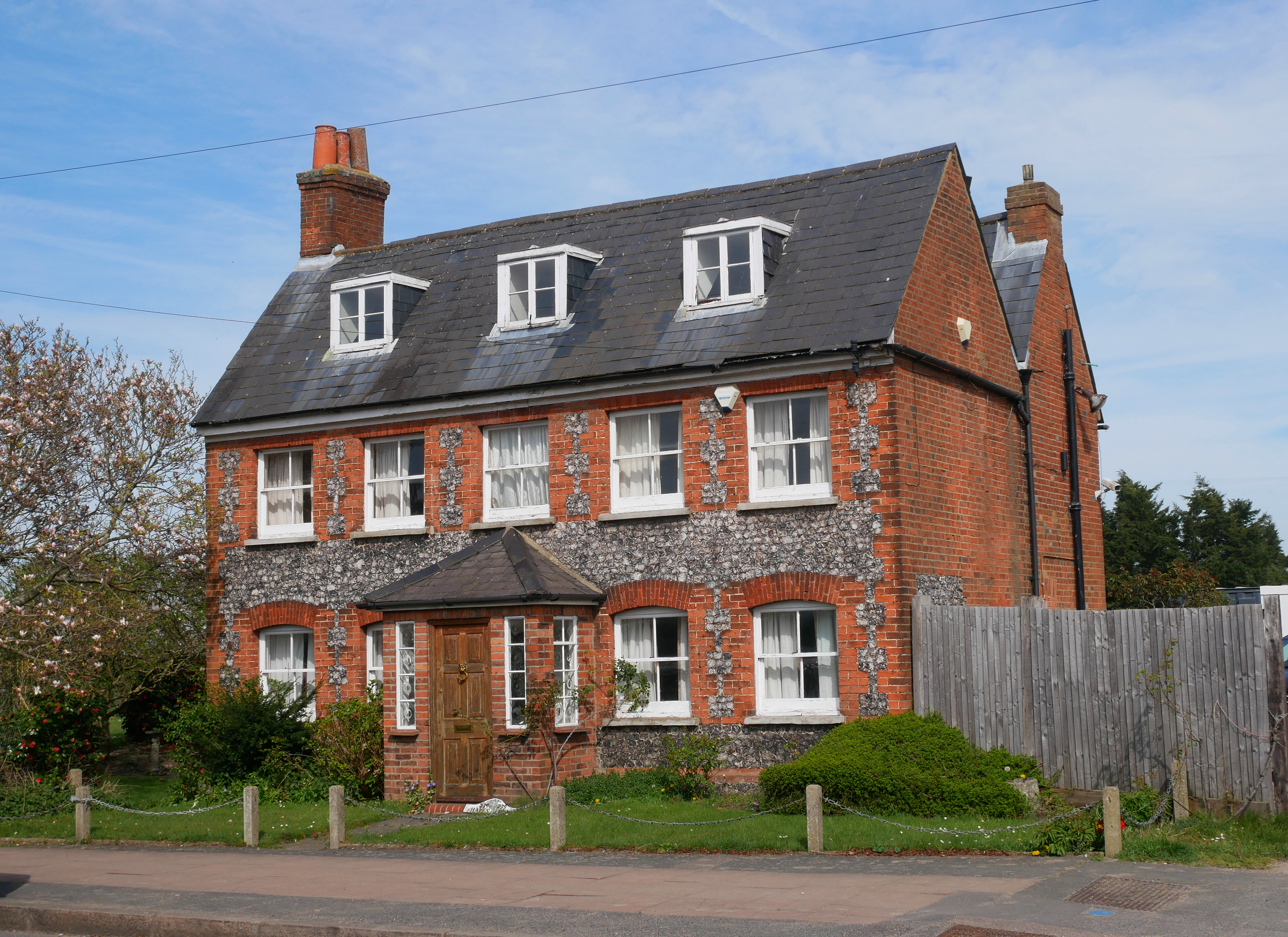
The early 19th-century Hayes Farmhouse, now a Grade II listed building

The name Hayes is recorded from 1177 as hoese from the Anglo-Saxon meaning "a settlement in open land overgrown with shrubs and rough bushes". It formed an ancient, and later civil, parish of Kent of around 1,282 acres (5.19 km^{2}). The village stood at the junction of Hayes Lane, leading north to Bromley (one mile distant), and what is now known as Pickhurst Lane, leading west to West Wickham; the centre of the old village is now called Hayes Street. The village school was here, as is the parish church of St Mary the Virgin. Parts of the church date back to the thirteenth century, however it was subject to heavy restorations by George Gilbert Scott and John Oldrid Scott in the 19th century. The village's public house, also on Hayes Street, is called "The George" (first recorded 1759). Hayes Street Farm, still shown on modern maps, is to the north of the village centre.

Both William Pitt the Elder, 1st Earl of Chatham (1708–1778), and William Pitt the Younger (1759–1806) lived at Hayes Place. The house, which dated back to the 15th century, was demolished in 1933 by the developer Henry Boot and the site redeveloped, but its occupants are remembered in such road names as Chatham and Pittsmead Avenues. Prior to being demolished, Hayes Place was owned by the Hambro family (of Hambros Bank fame) and a couple of roads bear the family names.

Although the parish church of Hayes can trace its history back over 800 years, and locals joined Jack Cade in his rebellion of 1450, the story of modern Hayes begins a little over a century ago, when Hayes became a popular place in which to live with bankers, stockbrokers and other City financiers buying property in the area. Development was aided when the branch railway from Elmers End, originally known as the West Wickham and Hayes Railway, was opened on 29 May 1882. Between 1801, when the population was just 382, and 1921, it had almost tripled to 1,010. On 1 April 1934 the civil parish was abolished and merged with Bromley and Beckenham. At the 1931 census (the last before the abolition of the parish), Hayes had a population of 1678.

=== Modern suburban Hayes ===
Throughout the 20th century, the Hayes village area continued to grow and thrive. Further commercial development occurred on Station Approach because the increased traffic through the railway terminus created an incentive for growth. In the old village area ('Old Hayes'), the former village school was converted to a church hall when the local primary school opened in 1937; it lies along George Lane, which was further expanded at around the same time to facilitate further suburban housing developments.

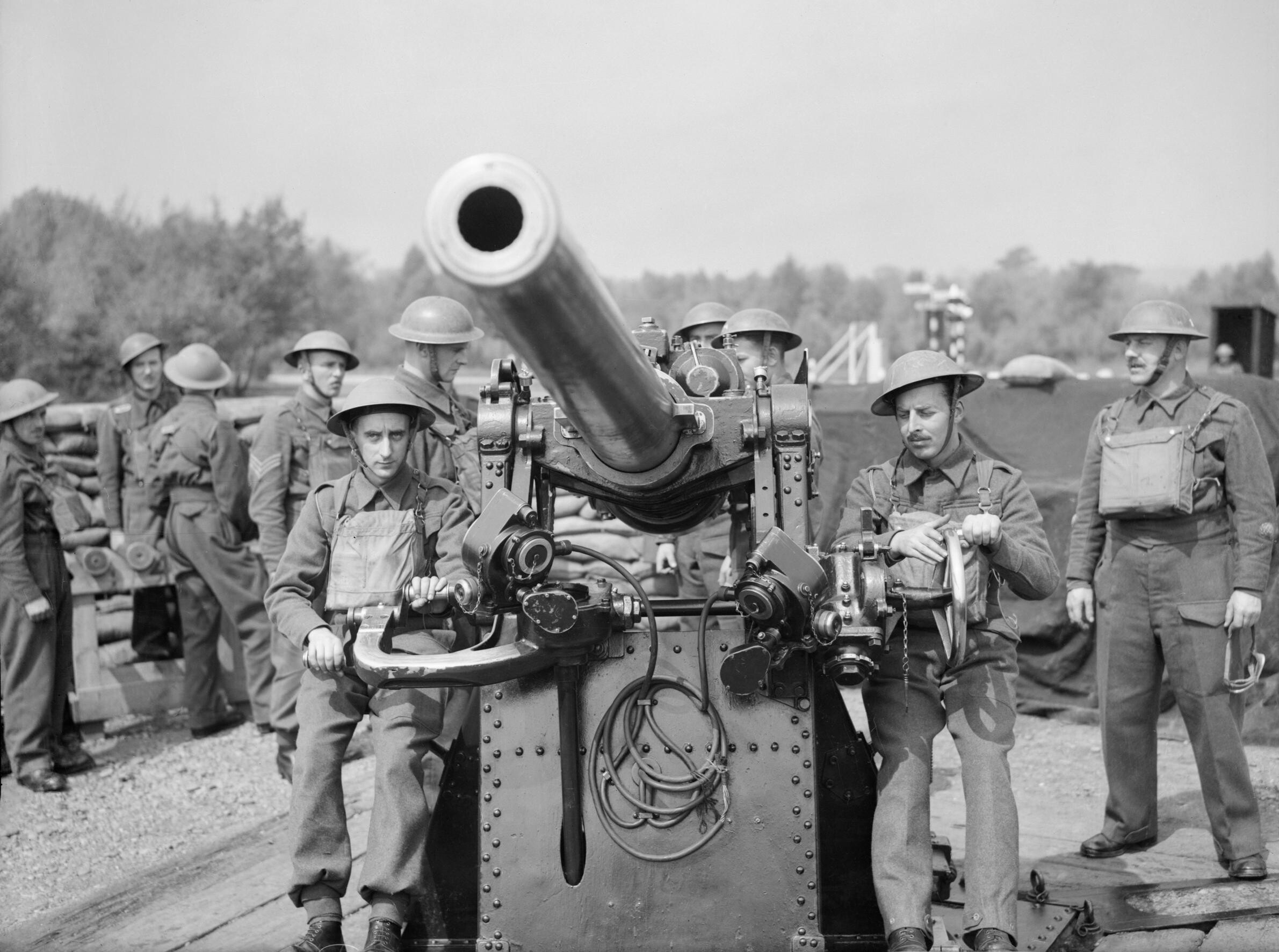
A 3-inch gun crew of 303rd Battery, 99th Anti-Aircraft Regiment, Royal Artillery, at Hayes Common in Kent, May 1940. H1387

To cope with the increase in commuter traffic, the station was rebuilt in 1935, and Station Approach became the main shopping area, including a Post Office, petrol station, two mini-supermarkets and numerous small shops. It also contains a public house called The New Inn.

During the Second World War an anti-aircraft gun battery was locally based on Hayes Common, and the soldiers of the 1st Canadian Division who manned it were barracked in local homes. Grandfields Nursery on West Common Road was hit by a V-2 rocket in the late afternoon of 9 February 1945, killing four people, including three members of the Grandfield family. Our Lady of the Rosary Catholic Church was later built on the site.

Much of the area to the west and north-west of the original village has been taken over by suburbia. West Wickham and Bromley are completely joined with Hayes; and Coney Hall estate, beyond the Orpington - Croydon road is also part of the pattern. To the east and south, however, the open space of Hayes Common precludes building of any kind.

The old village area along Hayes Street, also known as 'Old Hayes', today contains some small shops. The timbered cottage on the eastern side of Hayes Street was originally the village bakery, then it became a newsagents called "The Walnut Tree", until 2006, when it changed to residential use. The former village school remains a second village hall; the local primary school in George Lane has expanded in size in recent years, and now has three class groups in each year. It is very popular, and many of its pupils go on to Hayes School in West Common Road.

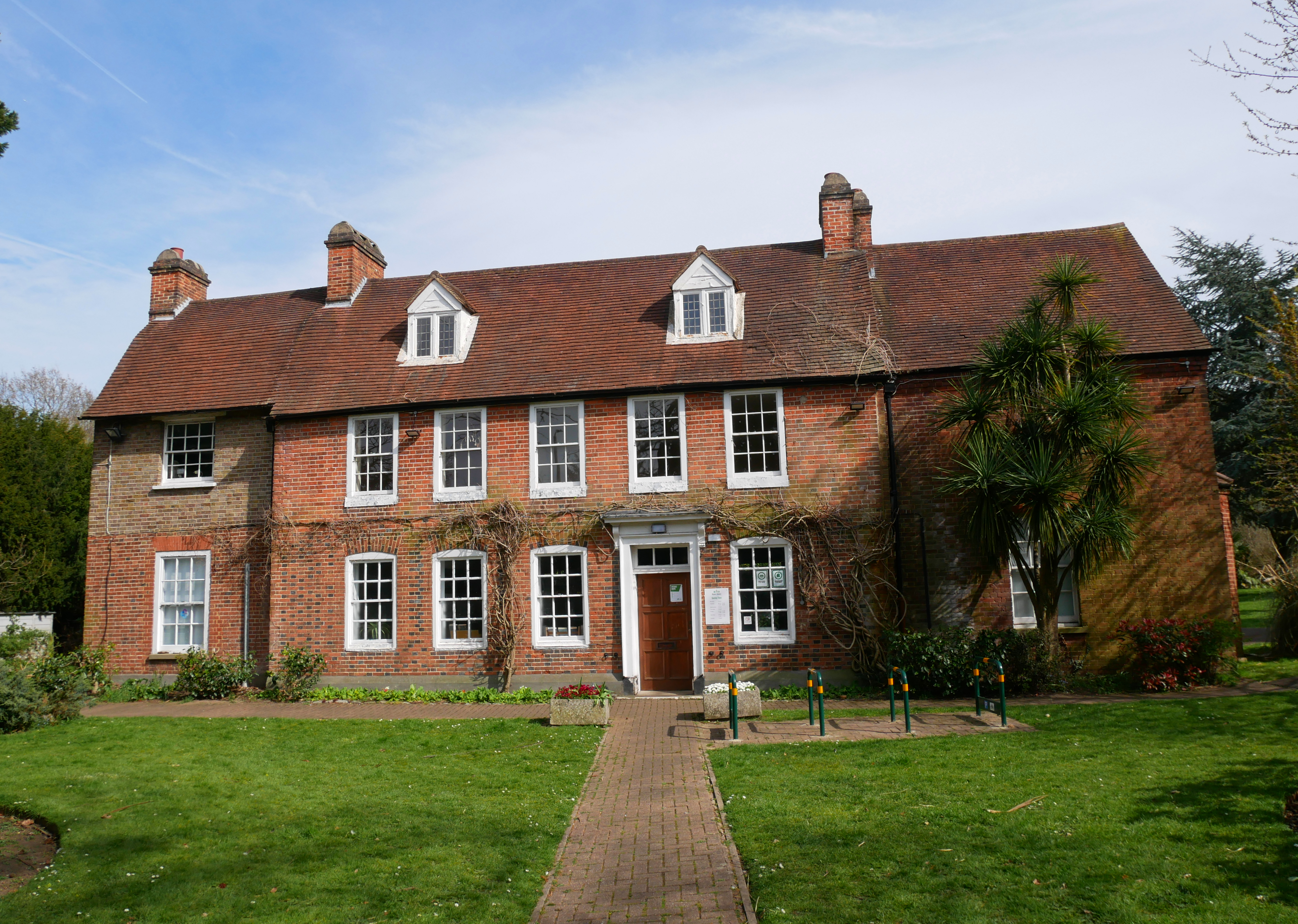
Hayes Library

The shopping area in Old Hayes functions as a second hub for commercial businesses, running along Hayes street opposite the church building. It consists of the public house, "The George", a mini-market, several hairdressers, a cycle shop, two coffee shops and a fish and chip shop. Next to the church is the village public library, part of the Bromley Borough Libraries Service, occupying the old rectory building (since replaced by the new rectory). The library is surrounded by the library gardens, a small area of parkland containing tennis courts. On the north side of the church is Hayes Village Hall, built in 1927 by Hayes Community Council. This was led by Canon Thompson.

Hayes Street Farm continues to play an important role in the village setting. Several public pathways and popular walking routes run through the farmland, and regular car boot sales are hosted on the farm fields.

A group called Hayes Village Association (HVA) meets regularly to inform people about local issues. They regularly liaise with Bromley Council on planning matters and they give a voice to residents and businesses on a variety of issues. HVA produce a quarterly magazine with local interest articles and events, as well as details of businesses in the locality. In 2024, the association faced closure but was revitalised by new volunteers.

== Sports and leisure ==
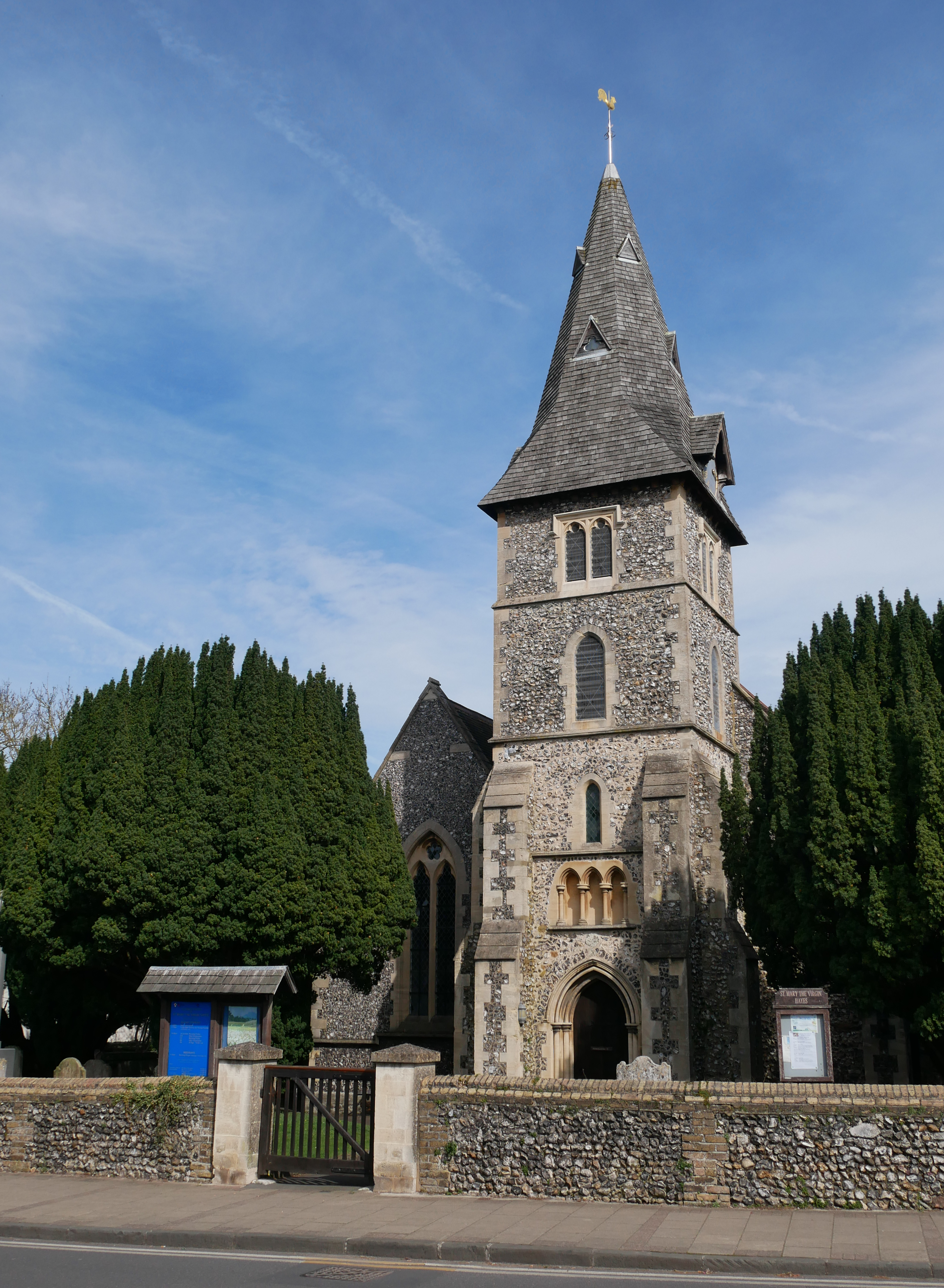
The Church of Saint Mary the Virgin in Hayes; a medieval structure, it was substantially rebuilt in the 19th century

There are numerous playing fields and sports grounds around the periphery of Hayes: such as the Metropolitan Police Sports Ground at the Warren. Was also home, since 1926, to the world-famous Blackheath Harriers Athletics Club (now Blackheath and Bromley Harriers Athletic Club) at their clubhouse The Sydney Wooderson Centre in 2023 moved now to (and also additionally run) the nearby Athletics track in Norman Park.

Sports bodies based in the area include:

- Hayes Town FC (Formed 2016). Members of the Surrey South Eastern Combination, based at Coney Hall FC's Tiepigs Lane ground.
- Beccehamians RFC – a Rugby Union Club founded in 1933 plays competitive rugby and walking rugby at Sparrows Den at the bottom of Corkscrew Hill near West Wickham.
- Hayes Cricket Club, based at the Warman Sport ground.
- Bromley RFC – a Rugby union club started in 1886 and moved to Hayes Village in 1956 and are based at the Warman Sport ground.
- Norman Park Athletics Track – one of the main athletics tracks in Bromley and run now by the "Blackheath Harriers" running club who have built a sports centre there.
- Bromley F.C. and London City Lionesses – Football clubs based at the Hayes Lane Stadium.
- Hayes (Lawn) Tennis club – based at the Warman Sport ground.
- Old Wilsonians Sports Club – on fields formerly known as Hayes Hill Sports Ground with facilities from Tennis, Squash, Cricket and Football.
- Bigfoot Cycle club.
- Roebucks Cricket Club.

== Arts and culture ==
Cultural bodies in the area include:

- Hayes Philharmonic Choir – 1945 – May 2017
- Hayes Players – Amateur theatre club founded in 1933 but disbanded in 2022 following challenges from declining membership and the COVID-19 pandemic.
- Hayes Symphony Orchestra – community orchestra, created in 1947

== Transport ==
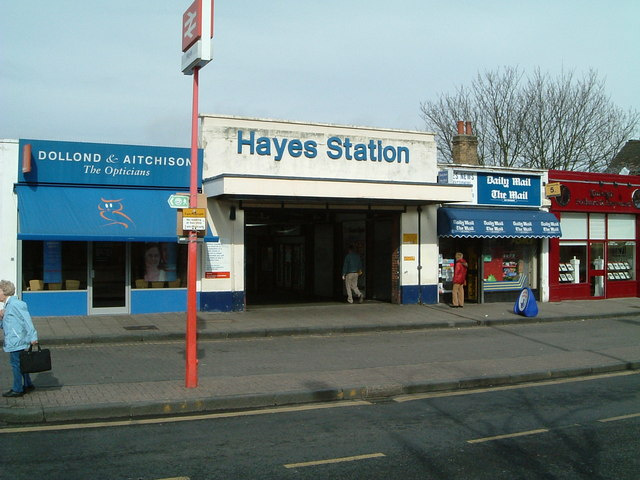
Hayes train station

=== Rail ===
Hayes railway station is in London Travel Zone 5 and is the terminus for Hayes line services operated by Southeastern to and from London Charing Cross and London Cannon Street stations. In 2022 the direct line from Hayes to Cannon Street was withdrawn.

=== Buses ===
Hayes is served by Transport for London bus routes 119 (24 hour service), 138, 146, 246, 314, 353 and 638.

These connect Hayes with areas including Bromley, Croydon (for trains to Gatwick Airport and Brighton), Eltham, New Addington, Orpington, West Wickham & Westerham.

== Education ==
- Hayes School – a mixed secondary school with academy status. Awarded WCSQM "World Class" status in October 2015.
- Hayes Primary School – a mixed primary school with academy status

== Green spaces ==
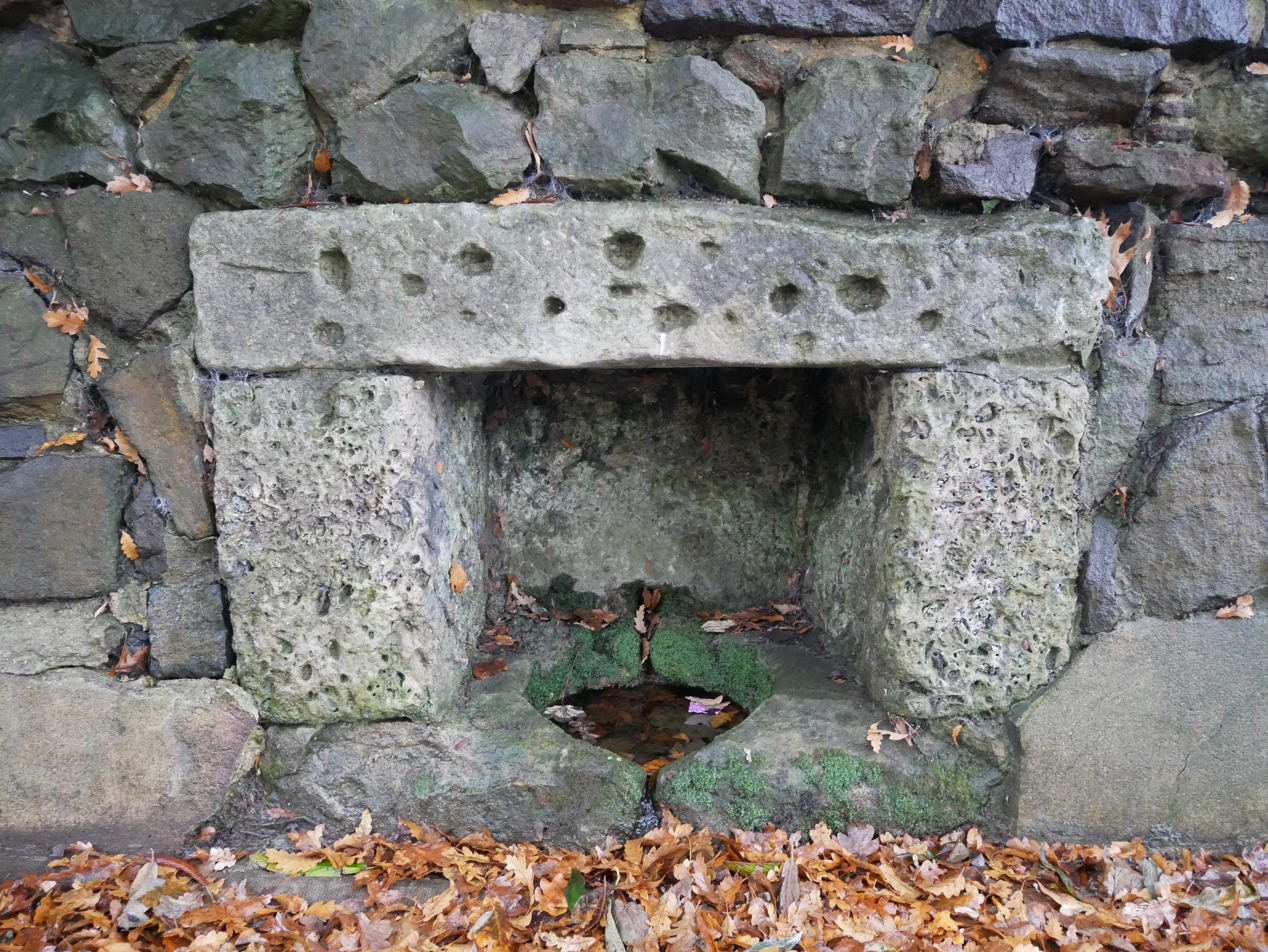
Hussey Well (or Jacob's Well) on Husseywell Crescent, adjacent to Husseywell Park

The area sits near the edge of the London conurbation and contains several parks, notably:

- Hayes Common – a 79-hectare area of public open land.
- Husseywell Park
- Coney Hall Recreation Ground
- Pickhurst Park
- The Knoll – an Ornamental Ground of four and a half hectares with lakes and specimen forest trees

== Notable residents ==
- William Pitt the Elder (1708–1778) — British Prime Minister, lived at Hayes Place
- Vicary Gibbs (1751–1820) — judge and politician, buried at St Mary the Virgin churchyard
- William Pitt the Younger (1759–1806) — British Prime Minister, born and grew up at Hayes Place
- Thomas John Hussey (1792–1866) — local clergyman and astronomer, thought to be first person to suggest the existence of Neptune
- Anna Maria Hussey (1805–1853) — mycologist and scientific illustrator, lived in Hayes as rector's wife
- John Ferguson McLennan (1827–1881) — advocate, social anthropologist and ethnologist, died in Hayes
- Everard Hambro (1842–1925) — banker and philanthropist, lived at Hayes Place
- Christopher Greener (1943–2015) — 7 ft 6+1/4 in (2.29 m) actor and basketball player, lived for much of his life in Hayes
- Pete Sears (1948)— musician, grew up in Hayes

== Gallery ==
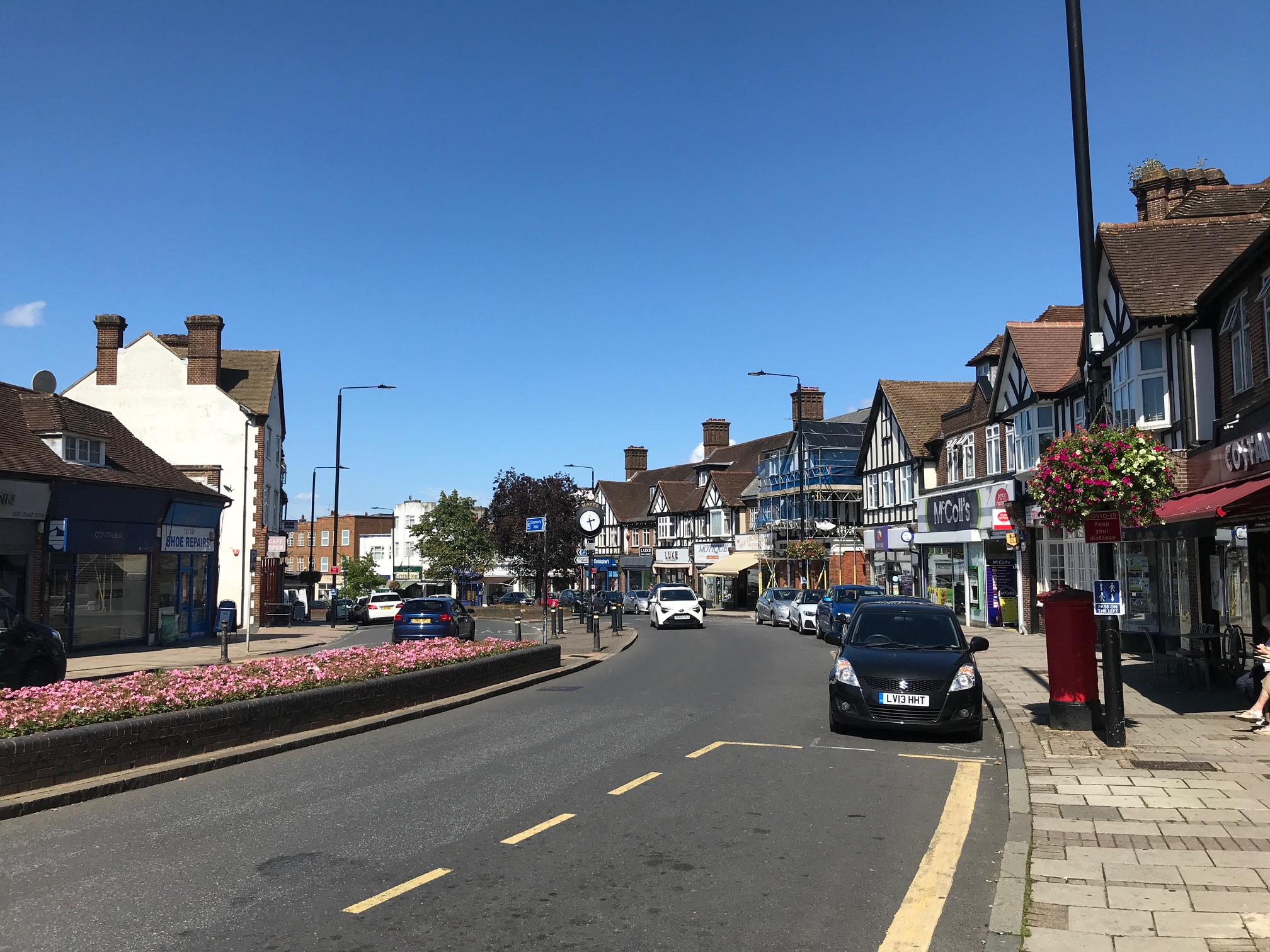
Shops on Station Approach

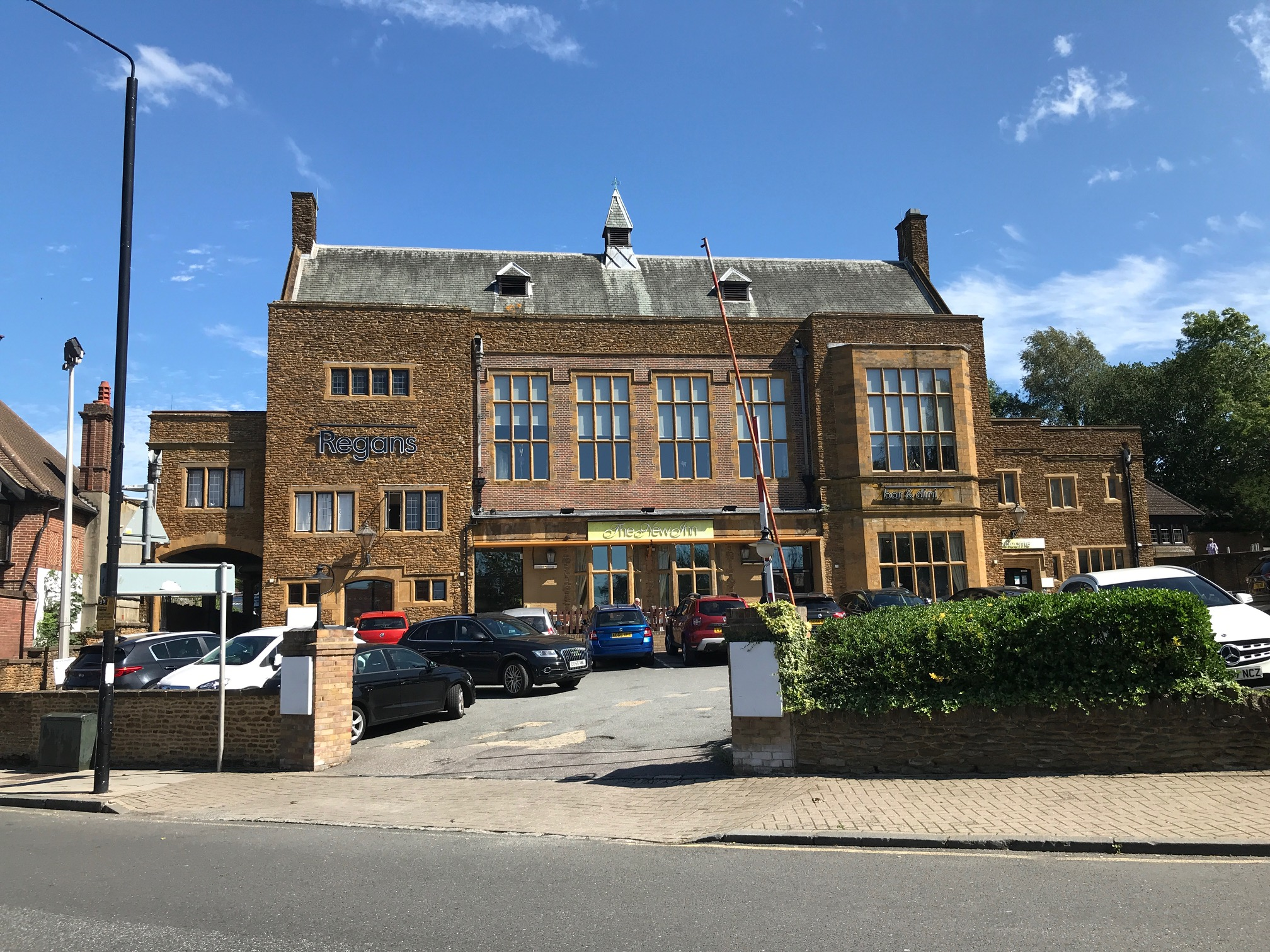
The New Inn pub opposite the train station

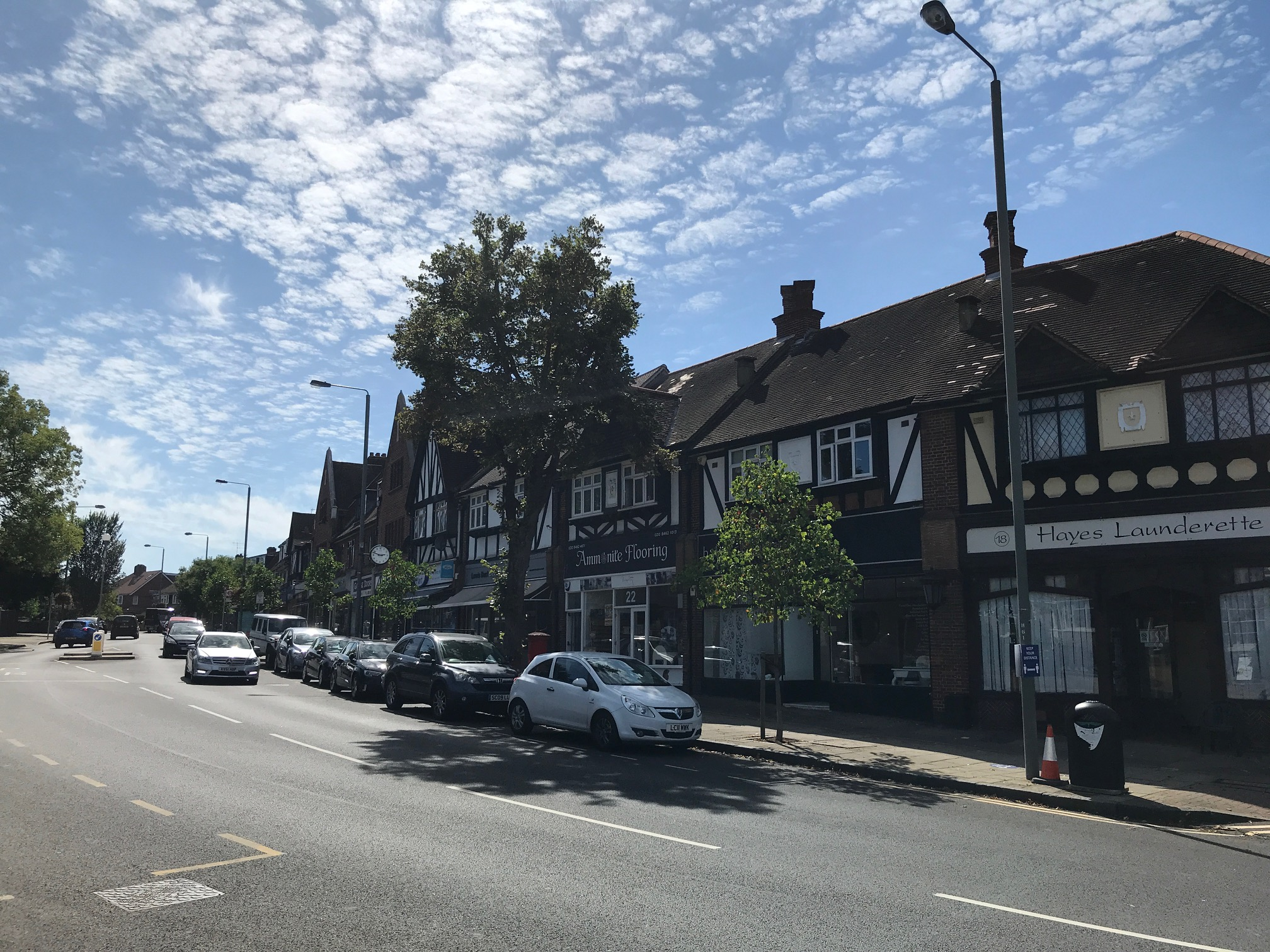
Shops on Hayes Street

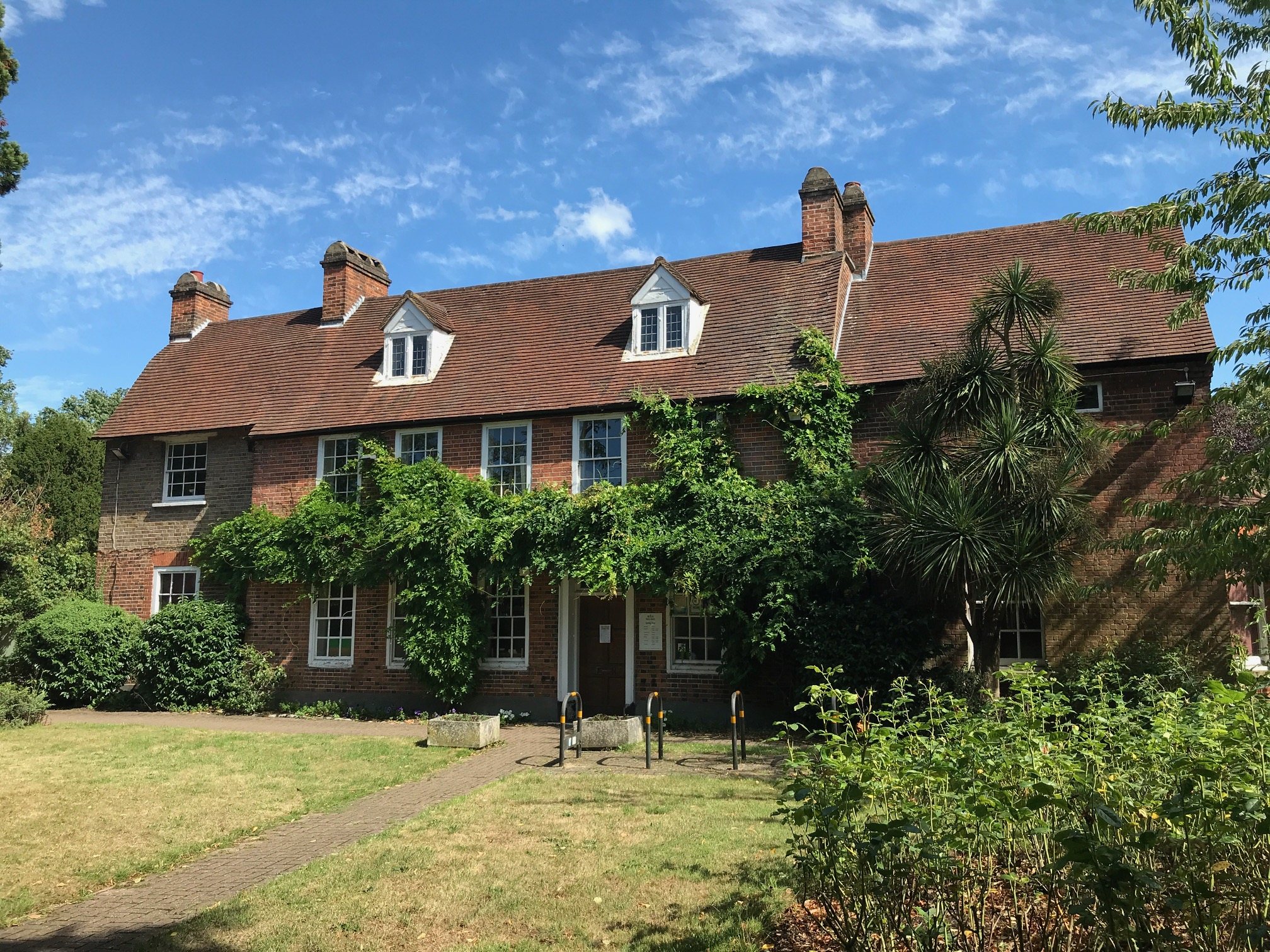
Hayes Library

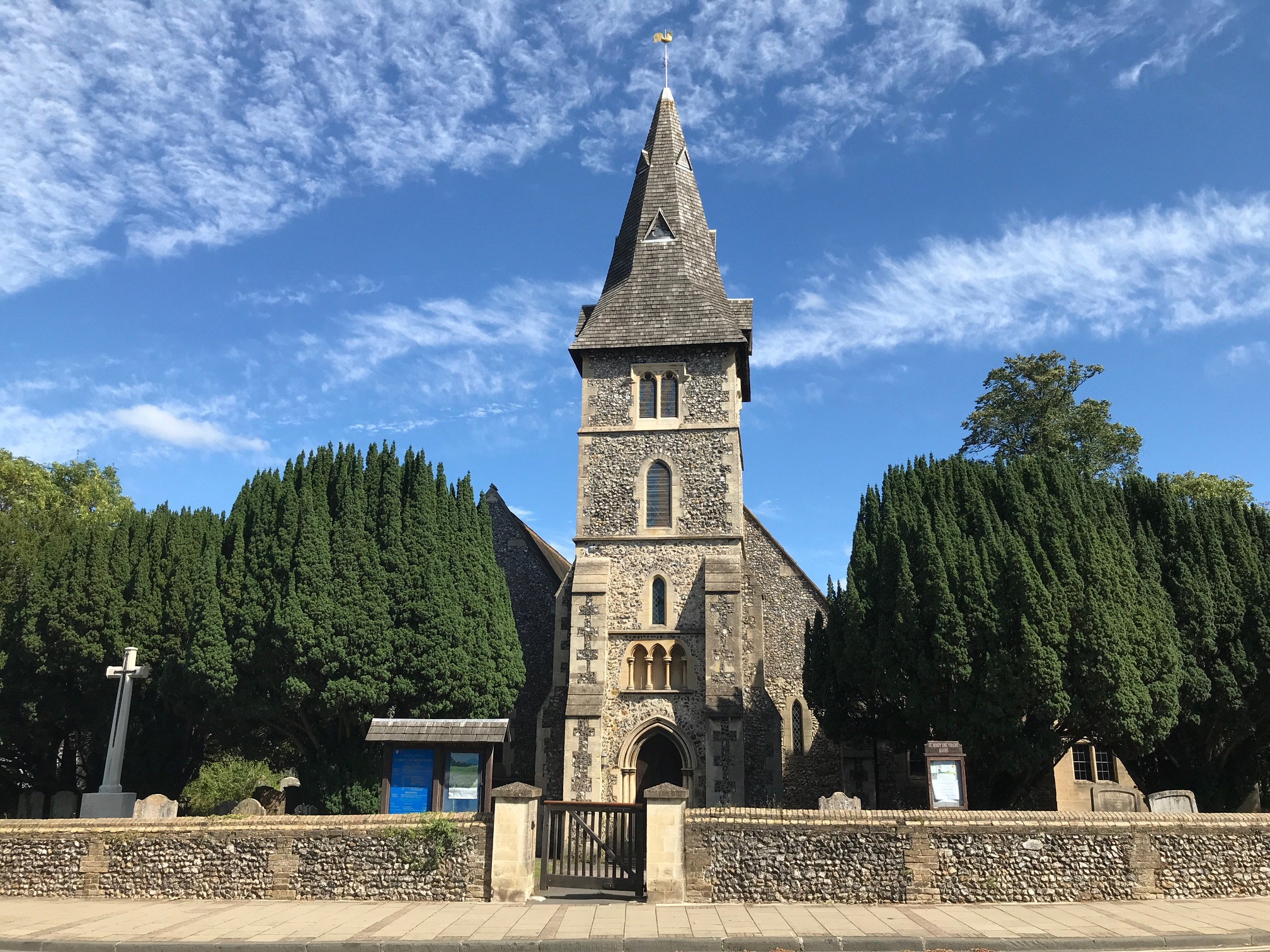
St Mary the Virgin church, listed at grade II

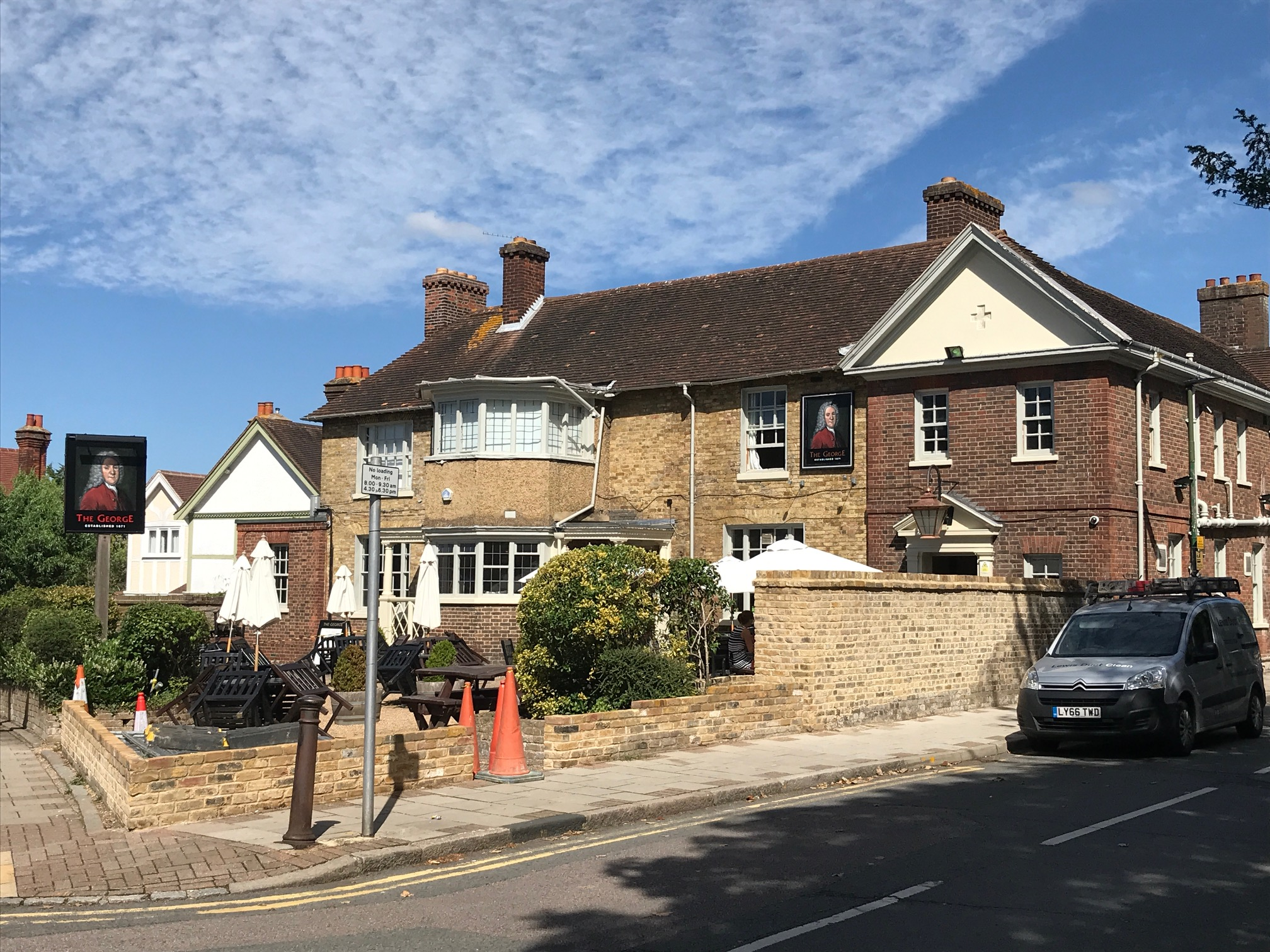
The George pub

== Geography ==
The terrain is "suburban" on a plateau around 70-80m elevation, drained by the Bourne tributary of the River Ravensbourne, with Hayes Common as a notable heathland and woodland area
