= Jocelyn Hambro =

British merchant banker and horse breeder

- Born: Jocelyn Olaf Hambro; 7 March 1919; London, England
- Died: 19 June 1994 (aged 75); Oxford, England
- Education: Eton College; Trinity College, Cambridge
- Occupations: Merchant banker, horsebreeder
- Title: Major
- Spouses: Ann Silvia Muir (m. 1942; died 1972) Margaret Innes-Ker, Duchess of Roxburghe (m. 1976; died 1983) Margaret, Countess Fortescue (m. 1988)
- Children: Rupert Hambro; Richard Hambro; James Hambro
- Parents: Olaf Hambro; Winifred Martin-Smith
- Relatives: Carl Joachim Hambro (great-grandfather); Charles Hambro, Baron Hambro (cousin)

Major Jocelyn Olaf Hambro MC (7 March 1919 – 19 June 1994) was a British merchant banker, horse breeder and philanthropist. He was the chairman of Hambros Bank from 1965 to 1972.

== Early life ==
Jocelyn Olaf Hambro was born on 7 March 1919 on Upper Brook Street in Mayfair, London, the son of Winifred Emily Ridley-Smith and Olaf Hambro.

His paternal great-grandfather, Carl Joachim Hambro, was a Danish-born immigrant to England who founded Hambros Bank in 1839. His father served as the Chairman of Hambros Bank from 1932 to 1960. His mother was Winifred Martin-Smith. He grew up at Kidbrooke Park, Sussex, and Glendoe, Loch Ness, Scotland. His mother drowned in Loch Ness in 1932. As a child, he summered in Biarritz, France.

He was educated at Eton College. He attended Trinity College, Cambridge. During World War II, he served as a Major in the Coldstream Guards. He was awarded an MC in 1944 for service with the Guards Armoured Division in Normandy but lost his left leg in August 1944.

== Career ==
Hambro started his career in the family business, Hambros Bank, in 1945, when he established an export trading company in the United States. He also established franchises of General Motors and British Motor Corporation cars. He served as the managing director of Hambros Bank, from 1947 to 1972, and as its chairman from 1965 to 1972. He introduced Eurodollars in January 1963. He also set up the Hambros Bank in Guernsey in 1967. He served as the Chairman of Hambros, Ltd from 1970 to 1983, and its President from 1983 to 1986. He sold Hambros Bank to the Société Générale in 1986.

He invested in "diamond broking, bullion dealing, mining and insurance." Specifically, he was an investor in the Union Corporation, a South African mining company, the Società Generale Immobiliare, an Italian real estate and construction company, and Taylor Woodrow, a British construction company. He was a co-founder of Hambro Life, an insurance company later known as Allied Dunbar, providing the seed money to start the firm. He served as the Chairman of Phoenix Assurance Co from 1979 to 1985. Additionally, he served as the Chairman of Charter Consolidated, a mining corporation, from 1982 to 1988.

In 1986, he co-founded J.O. Hambro Capital Management, a mergers and acquisitions financial firm, with his three sons. He served as its chairman from 1986 to 1994.

He was the namesake of J. O. Hambro Investment Management, a financial firm founded by his son Richard in 1986 and renamed Waverton Investment Management in 2014.

== Equestrianism ==
Hambro was a member of the Jockey Club. He bred Thoroughbreds at Waverton, his farm in Gloucestershire, and attended races at the Newmarket Racecourse.

== Philanthropy ==
Hambro served as the chairman and trustee of the Henry Smith Charity. He served on the Board of Governors of the Peabody Trust, a non-profit organisation which offers affordable housing to the disadvantaged. He also served as the chairman and treasurer of Blesma, The Limbless Veterans.

He endowed the Joint British Cancer Charities J. O. Hambro Award for the Businessman of the Year, which raises funds for Cancer Research UK, Imperial Cancer Research, the Marie Curie Cancer Care and the Cancer Relief Macmillan Fund.

== Personal life ==
He married Ann Silvia Muir. They had three sons:

- Rupert Hambro
- Richard Hambro
- James Hambro.

He married two more times: first to Margaret Innes-Ker, Duchess of Roxburghe in 1976, secondly to Margaret, Countess Fortescue (née Elisabeth Margaret Stratton, formerly married to Richard Fortescue, 7th Earl Fortescue) in 1988.

He enjoyed grouse shooting in Scotland in August.

== Death ==
He died on 19 June 1994 in Oxford.
