= Everard Hambro =

British banker & philanthropist (1842–1925)

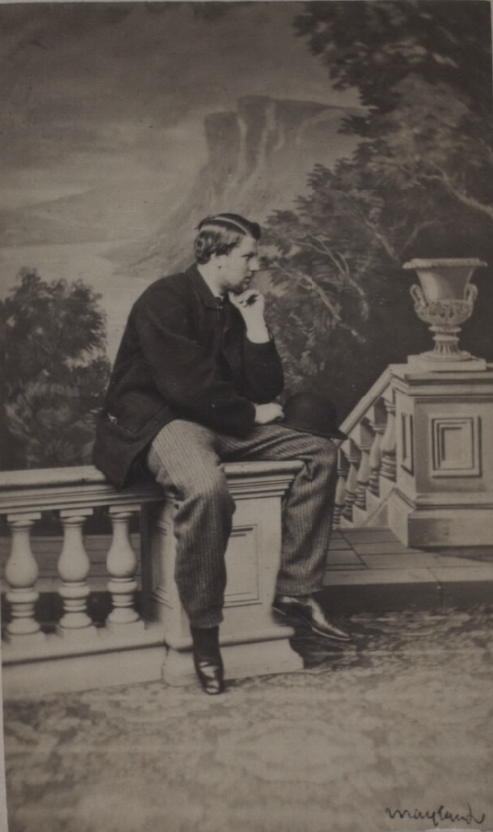
- Born: Everard Alexander Hambro; 11 April 1842; Willesden, London, England
- Died: 26 February 1925 (aged 82); Hayes, Kent, England
- Education: Trinity College, Cambridge
- Occupation: Banker
- Spouses: Gertrude Mary Stuart (m. 1866); Ebba Harline d'Iberville Le Moyne Whyte (m. 1911)
- Children: Charles Eric Hambro; Harold Everard Hambro; Angus Valdemar Hambro; Violet Mary Hambro; Ronald Olaf Hambro
- Parents: Carl Joachim Hambro (father); Caroline Gostenhofer (mother)
- Relatives: Calmer Hambro (paternal great-grandfather); Joseph Hambro (paternal grandfather)

Sir Everard Alexander Hambro KCVO (11 April 1842 – 26 February 1925) was a British banker and philanthropist.

== Early life ==
Everard Hambro was born 11 April 1842 in Willesden, London. His father, Carl Joachim Hambro, was a Danish immigrant who founded the Hambros Bank in London in 1839. His paternal grandfather, Joseph Hambro, was a Danish banker and political advisor. His paternal great-grandfather, Calmer Hambro, was a Danish merchant and banker. He graduated from Trinity College, Cambridge.

== Career ==
Hambro started his career at the family business, Hambros Bank, in 1869. He served on the board of directors of the Bank of England from 1879 to 1925. He helped save Barings Bank in 1891. As a member of the Fowler Committee, Everard Hambro submitted a separate note proposing the setting up of a state bank in India along the lines of the Bank of England and Bank of France.

== Personal life ==
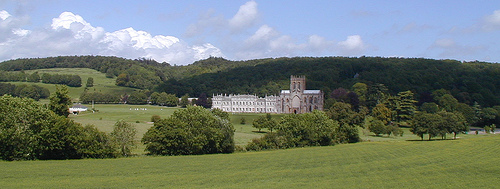
Milton Abbey.

Hambro was married twice. He married Gertrude Mary Stuart in 1866. They resided at Hayes Place, Hayes, Kent, and at Milton Abbey in Milton, Dorset. He married, secondly, in 1911, to Ebba Harline d'Iberville Le Moyne Whyte.

They had five children:

- Sir Charles Eric Hambro.
- Lt.-Col. Harold Everard Hambro.
- Angus Valdemar Hambro.
- Violet Mary Hambro; married Everard Martin Smith and her elder son was Eric Martin Smith, MP.
- Ronald Olaf Hambro.

== Death ==
Hambro died on 26 February 1925, aged 82, at Hayes, Kent. and is buried at St. Mary the Virgin Church there.
