= Hansteen Holdings =

Hansteen Holdings plc
- Company type: Public
- Traded as: LSE: HSTN
- Industry: Property
- Founded: 2005
- Headquarters: London, UK
- Key people: James Hambro (Chairman); Morgan Jones and Ian Watson (Joint CEOs)
- Revenue: £112.6 million (2016)
- Operating income: £140.9 million (2016)
- Net income: £109.5 million (2016)
- Website: www.hansteen.co.uk

Hansteen Holdings plc is a European industrial REIT that invests in properties with high yields, low financing costs and opportunities for value improvement across the Netherlands, Germany, Belgium, France and the UK. It is listed on the London Stock Exchange.

== History ==
The company was founded by Morgan Jones and Ian Watson in 2005 to exploit the industrial property investment market in Continental Europe. It was admitted to the Alternative Investment Market in November 2005, raising £125 million. In October 2009 it raised a further £200.8 million by way of a Placing and Open Offer and moved to the Official List, converting to a REIT shortly thereafter.

In December 2019, it was announced that funds advised by The Blackstone Group would buy the company for £500 million.

== Operations ==
In August 2009 Hansteen launched Hansteen UK Industrial Property Unit Trust (HPUT), a vehicle with up to £180 million to invest in UK industrial property with a value of £15 million or less, or portfolios under £30 million. In 2010 Hansteen increased its portfolio to 189 assets with a value of around £721.9 million through the acquisition of a German industrial property portfolio from HBI for approx. €330 million and the acquisition of the 1,200,000 sq ft (110,000 m^{2}) multi-sector Kilmartin portfolio of UK properties for £80.37 million. The Company's investment portfolio was valued at £1.7 billion as at 31 December 2016.
