= Vicary Gibbs (judge) =

English judge and politician

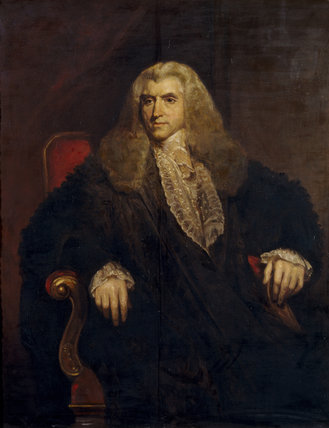
Sir Vicary Gibbs

Sir Vicary Gibbs, PC (27 October 1751 – 8 February 1820) was an English judge and politician. He was known for his caustic wit, which won for him the sobriquet of "Vinegar Gibbs".

== Early life and education ==
Gibbs was the first surviving son of George Abraham Gibbs, a surgeon and apothecary of Exeter, and his wife Anne Vicary. He attended Eton from 1764 until 1771 and obtained a BA at King's College, Cambridge. During this period, he was a devoted classical scholar, a King's Scholar at Eton and a Craven scholar at King's College.

He was a fellow of King's from 1774 until 1784, when he married Frances Cerjat Mackenzie, the sister of Lord Seaforth. This marked the end of his classical career, although he had as early as 1769 shown himself committed to the law by enrolment at Lincoln's Inn; nonetheless, he remained fond of classical literature and English drama throughout his life.

== Legal career ==
Gibbs's unpleasant voice, disagreeable temper, and jejune pedigree presented formidable handicaps at the start of his career. He initially employed himself as a special pleader, in which capacity he developed a good professional reputation, and was called to the bar in 1783. He proved successful, if acidulous, as an advocate, and powerful in marshalling evidence. He unsuccessfully defended William Winterbotham for sedition in 1793, but so impressed John Horne Tooke that he was retained as junior counsel to Erskine in the successful defence of Tooke and Hardy in autumn 1794. Gibbs' abilities were already being courted by the government, leading to his appointment as recorder of Bristol that February. His efforts during the trial of Tooke and Hardy impressed Sir John Scott, the prosecutor, and Gibbs took silk in December.

== Politics ==
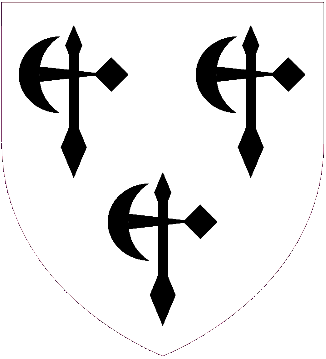
Arms, displayed at Lincoln's Inn

The Pitt ministry continued to court him, and he held legal office for the Prince of Wales from 1795 until 1805. Furthermore, in 1804, he obtained the post of Chief Justice of Chester. As part of the Welsh circuit, this post did not debar him from being returned as Member of Parliament for Totnes in December. He was made Solicitor General in February 1805 and knighted; however, he left office in favour of Sir Arthur Piggott after Pitt's death in January 1806.

Hostile to Grenville, he lost his seat at Totnes, but the formation of the second Portland government in 1807 saw him made Attorney General and returned to Parliament for Great Bedwyn. In the 1807 general election, he defeated Lord Henry Petty to become member for Cambridge University. Under the Portland and Perceval ministries, he was noted for his zealous activities against publishers of seditious libels. In the House of Commons, his most significant activity occurred in 1809, during the inquiry into military corruption and the activities of Mary Anne Clarke, mistress of the Duke of York. However, her adroit response to his examination delighted the press, many members of whom had suffered from Gibbs's activities. His caustic tongue did not make him a favourite among the House, and his principles were quite conservative.

== Judge ==
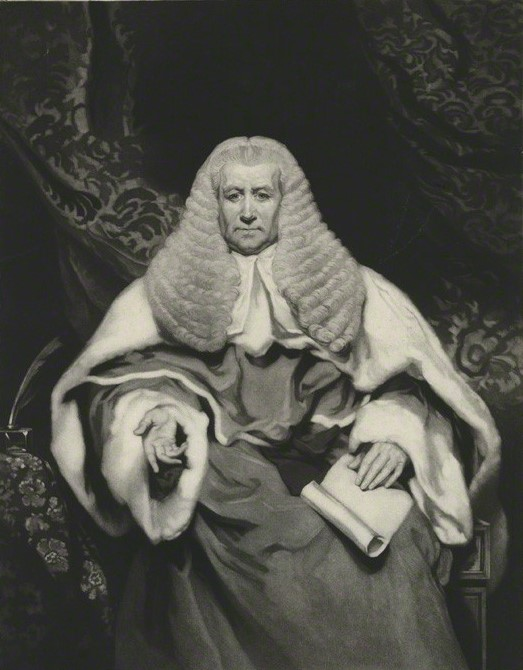
Sir Vicary Gibbs as Chief Justice of the Common Pleas

In May 1812, he resigned as Attorney General, accepting an appointment as a puisne judge in the Court of Common Pleas. This may have been the result of poor health; Henry Brougham attributed it to personal anxiety after the assassination of the Prime Minister, Spencer Perceval. Samuel Romilly, the law reformer and MP, recalled in the immediate aftermath hearing from the assembled crowd outside the Palace of Westminster "the most savage expressions of joy and exultation ... accompanied with regret that others, and particularly the attorney general, had not shared the same fate". It was Gibbs' task to lead the prosecution team at the Old Bailey trial of John Bellingham, who was sentenced to death for the murder.

In any case, Gibbs accepted a great reduction in income to do so, although his appointment as Lord Chief Baron of the Exchequer in November 1813 somewhat eased this. He was, at the same time, sworn of the Privy Council. In February 1814, another promotion made him Chief Justice of the Common Pleas. His tenure there was characterised by a thorough mastery of the law, although opinions vary as to whether his temper had by this time been checked. Probably the most celebrated case he heard was the libel action brought by Lady Frances Webster and her husband over the allegation (almost certainly untrue) that she had an affair with the Duke of Wellington. A further decline in health led to his resignation in November 1818, and he died on 8 February 1820 aged 68 at his house in London, later being interred in the Churchyard of St. Mary the Virgin in Hayes, Bromley.

== Sources ==
- Melikan, R.A. (2004). "Gibbs, Sir Vicary (1751–1820)". Oxford Dictionary of National Biography. Oxford Dictionary of National Biography (online ed.). Oxford University Press. doi:10.1093/ref:odnb/10608. (Subscription, Wikipedia Library access or UK public library membership required.)

Parliament of the United Kingdom
Preceded by William Adams; John Berkeley Burland	Member of Parliament for Totnes; 1804–1806; With: William Adams	Succeeded by William Adams; Benjamin Hall
Preceded by Viscount Stopford; James Henry Leigh	Member of Parliament for Great Bedwyn; 1807; With: James Henry Leigh	Succeeded by James Henry Leigh; Sir John Nicholl
Preceded by Earl of Euston; Lord Henry Petty	Member of Parliament for Cambridge University; 1807–1812; With: Earl of Euston 1807–1811; Viscount Palmerston 1811–1812	Succeeded by Viscount Palmerston; John Henry Smyth
Legal offices
Preceded by John Anstruther	Solicitor-General of the Duchy of Cornwall; 1795–1800	Succeeded by Thomas Manners-Sutton
Preceded by Robert Graham	Attorney-General of the Duchy of Cornwall; 1800–1805	Succeeded by William Adam
Preceded by James Mansfield	Chief Justice of Chester; 1804	Succeeded by Robert Dallas
Preceded by Sir Thomas Manners-Sutton	Solicitor General; 1805–1806	Succeeded by Sir Samuel Romilly
Preceded by Sir Arthur Piggott	Attorney General; 1807–1812	Succeeded by Sir Thomas Plumer
Preceded by Sir Archibald Macdonald	Lord Chief Baron of the Exchequer; 1813–1814	Succeeded by Sir Alexander Thomson
Preceded by Sir James Mansfield	Chief Justice of the Common Pleas; 1814–1818	Succeeded by Sir Robert Dallas
