= St Mary the Virgin, Hayes, Bromley =

Coordinates: 51.3784°N 0.0180°E

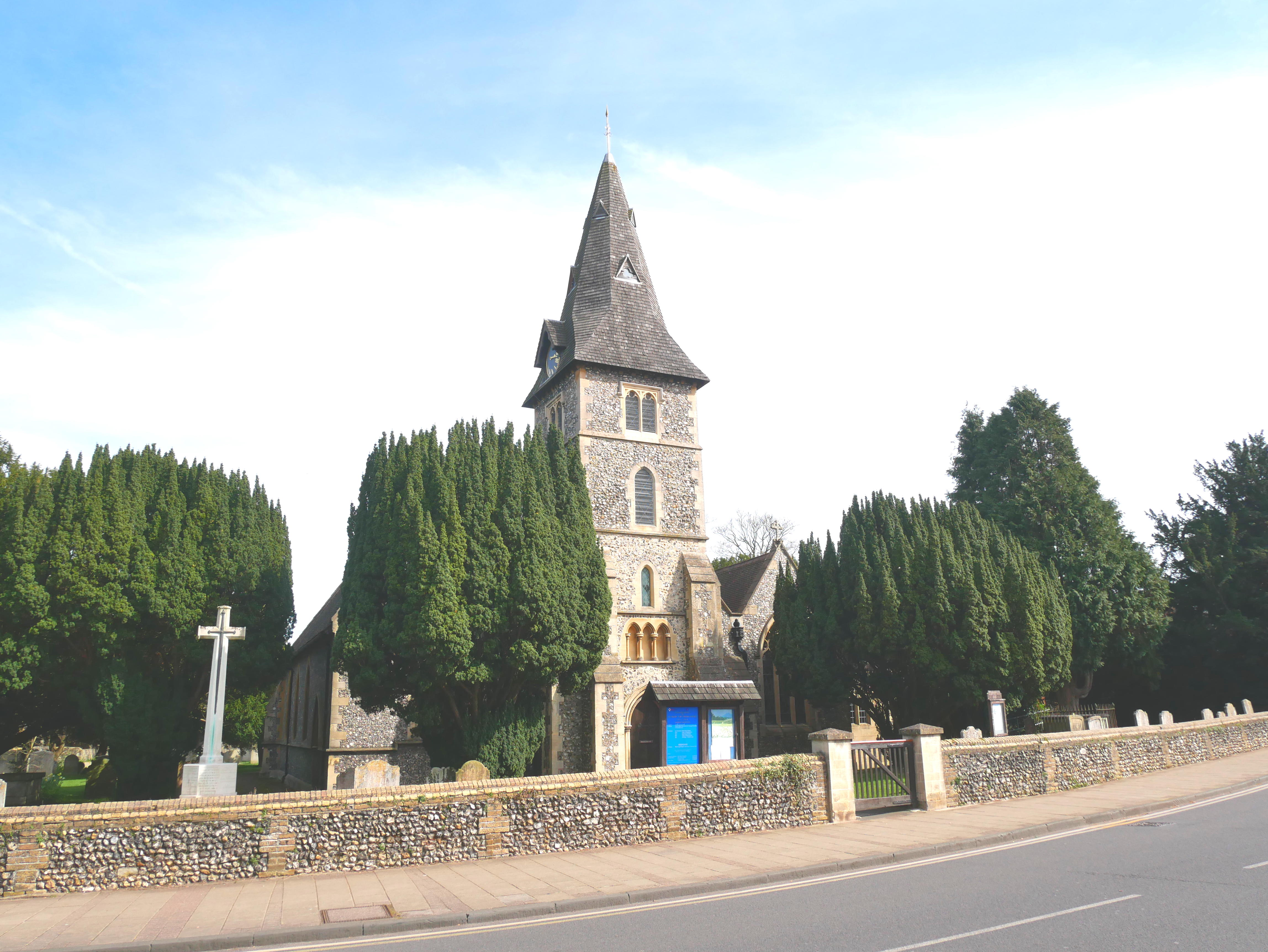
- St Mary the Virgin, Hayes, Bromley
- OS grid reference: TQ 40546 66301
- Country: England
- Denomination: Church of England

Administration
- Diocese: Rochester
- Parish: Old Hayes

Clergy
- Rector: Revd. Napoleon John

St Mary the Virgin is a Gothic church in South London, built in the 12th century but with notable Gothic Revival modifications and additions in the mid-Victorian period to the designs of Sir George Gilbert Scott and his son John Oldrid Scott. It is dedicated to St Mary the Virgin. In its present form, this church is a hall church with an aisled nave of three vessels of similar heights under three parallel roofs

== Location ==
The Church is located in what is known as ‘Old Hayes’, a suburb of Bromley. The arrival of the railway from Charing Cross in the 1860s divided the village in two, the church being where historically the Village was first founded.

== History ==
The church was established more than eight hundred years ago and underwent considerable alterations in the Victorian era. The north aisle was added in 1856 and the tower modified in 1861, with the south aisle and Organ transept following in 1879. The expansions were overseen and carried out by George Gilbert Scott and his son John Oldrid Scott and remained faithful to the barn-style architecture of the medieval period. Arches from the 13th century are still found along the north and south walls. It was during this time much of the medieval furnishings were removed, however the 15th century timber roof beams and a small lancet window in the west end of the nave survived. In 2005 a meeting room was erected to the rear of the Church and is used by many clubs and societies in the locality.

St Mary's was the local Parish church for two British Prime Ministers, William Pitt the Elder and William Pitt the Younger, the latter of whom was christened here and are remembered by a wall memorial funded by Parliament. They lived opposite the church in a country house called Hayes Place, which was also the home of Everard Hambro. Sir Vicary Gibbs was also a Parishioner and is buried in the Churchyard: within the church is a monument detailing his life. The churchyard is also the final resting place of John Panis (where panis was the general term for an enslaved Native American), being brought over here as a slave, he died in 1763.
