= Bermuda Commercial Bank =

Bank of Bermuda

- Company type: Private company
- Industry: Financial services
- Founded: 1969; 57 years ago
- Headquarters: Hamilton, Bermuda
- Area served: Bermuda
- Key people: Andy Mielczarek (CEO, chairman)
- Products: Banking services
- Owner: Provident Holdings Limited
- Website: www.bcb.bm

Bermuda Commercial Bank Limited (BCB) is a Bermudian bank that is one of four licensed banks in Bermuda. It has been a 100% subsidiary of Provident Holdings Limited since 2021.

== History ==
BCB began by an Act of Parliament in February 1969. BCBs core banking system provides a suite of products, including online banking. In June of 2016, the BCB Group of Companies moved into a new location at 34 Bermudiana Road, Hamilton. In 2019, BCB also celebrated its 50-year anniversary of providing banking services to Bermuda and internationally.

In July 2021, the investment company, Provident Holdings Limited, purchased the BCB Group of Companies from Somers Limited. On March 1, 2022, BCB sold its licensed trust business and a primary licensed corporate administration services business together with two minor operational subsidiaries. The sale was in line with a renewed strategy to focus on the core banking business in Bermuda.

In February 2025, BCB announced leadership changes, with Neville Grant stepping down as CEO and Andy Mielczarek - formerly of HSBC, Bank of America, and UK digital bank Chetwood Financial - set to take over as chairman and CEO, pending regulatory approval, with Graham Jackson serving as interim CEO in the meantime.

In February 2026, the bank backed the government's initiative to make Bermuda the world's first fully on-chain economy, and the following month, struck a partnership deal with cryptofinance firm XBTO to upgrade its USD payment infrastructure.
