= IRC Limited =

IRC Limited (IRC; simplified Chinese: 铁江现货有限公司; traditional Chinese: 鐵江現貨有限公司) (SEHK: 1029) is a Hong Kong-based mining company engaged in the production and development of industrial commodities, primarily iron ore. The company operates in the Russian Far East, particularly in the Amur and Jewish Autonomous Oblasts near the border with China. IRC is listed on the Main Board of the Hong Kong Stock Exchange.

== History ==
IRC was incorporated in Hong Kong on 4 June 2010 as Thor Limited, a wholly owned subsidiary of Petropavlovsk plc, a London-listed gold mining company. Through corporate restructuring, it acquired Aricom, a formerly London-listed iron ore producer in Russia. The company changed its name to IRC Limited in September 2010 and listed on the Hong Kong Stock Exchange on 21 October 2010.

In January 2013, IRC entered into a conditional subscription agreement with General Nice Development and Minmetals Cheerglory for a proposed equity investment of approximately US$238 million. As of end-2013, Petropavlovsk remained the largest shareholder with nearly 50%, while General Nice held over 20%.

In December 2021, Petropavlovsk divested its 31.1% stake in IRC. A 29.86% interest was sold to Stocken Board, which subsequently transferred it to Gazprombank via Cerisier Ventures Limited (24.07%) and to Dmitry Bakatin via Major Mining Partner (CY) Limited (5.79%). The remaining 1.2% stake was acquired by the UCP fund of Ilya Sherbovich.

In January 2022, Cerisier and Major Mining sold their respective shares to Axiomi Consolidation Ltd., a company controlled by Nikolai Levitskii, who became the non-executive chairman of IRC.

== Operations ==
=== Kimkan & Sutara (K&S) ===
The K&S project is IRC's flagship mining and processing operation located in the Jewish Autonomous Region. It comprises two main deposits, Kimkan and Sutara. Phase I of the project targets an annual output of 3.2 million tonnes of 65% iron ore concentrate. Sutara will be mined alongside Kimkan starting in 2023, with a mine life exceeding 30 years. IRC is considering an upgrade to increase production to 4.6 million tonnes per year and an eventual Phase II expansion to 6.3 million tonnes.

=== Garinskoye ===
Located in Amur Oblast, Garinskoye is a 99.6% owned advanced exploration project envisioned as a large-scale open-pit operation. It also holds potential for near-term direct shipping ore (DSO) output.

=== Other projects ===
- Bolshoi Seym: 100% owned ilmenite project in Amur Region
- SRP: 46% owned vanadium pentoxide project in Heilongjiang, China
- Giproruda: 70% owned mining consultancy and engineering services firm based in Saint Petersburg, Russia

== See also ==
- Aricom
- Mining in Russia
- Petropavlovsk plc
