= Edi Truell =

British private equity and pensions businessman

Edmund George Imjin Fosbroke Truell (born 1962) is a British private equity and pensions businessman.

Truell graduated from Durham University in 1984 with a degree in economics. In January 2025, investment funds controlled by Truell made a £245 million conditional offer for the banknote printer De La Rue.
