= Norman Park, Bromley =

Recreation ground in London, England

Norman Park
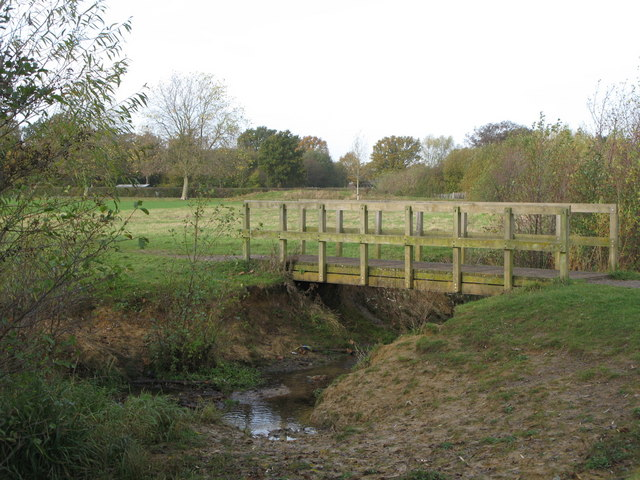
- Bridge over the stream known as the Ravensbourne River
- Interactive map of Norman Park
- Type: Public park
- Location: Hayes, Bromley, England
- Coordinates: 51°23′17″N 0°01′35″E
- Area: 56 acres (23 ha)
- Created: 1934
- Operator: London Borough of Bromley
- Status: Open year-round
- Website: bromley.gov.uk/directory_record/1212736/norman_park

Norman Park is a recreation ground in Bromley, England.

It has a playground and athletics track, and hosts events such as a music festivals, weekly organised Parkruns and yearly car shows.

A 1.2-mile (2 km) pathway circles the park, making it popular with joggers, cyclists and dog walkers.

The former park keeper's lodge is being converted by Mencap into an office and three business units that will teach people that fall under Mencap remit horticulture, bicycle repair and catering whilst also being viable businesses. The catering unit, for example, will take the form of a café which will meet a need of the park not covered by a permanent solution.

The park, for the most part, does not share its borders with any housing (instead bordered by farmland and Scrogginhall Wood), giving the park a sense of space and reducing the risk that noise affects neighbours.

== History ==
The 1st edition OS Map of 1871 shows the site as farmland. The park is named after the Norman family, whose estates once dominated Bromley; their name dates back to 1661. The land for Norman Park was acquired from A C Norman by Bromley Council in 1934 for £24,000 to provide land for leisure activities.

A stream called the Ravensbourne runs for 330 yards (300 m) across the park. Whilst originally hidden underground in steel and concrete pipe (called a Culvert) in 2000 it was re-exposed (known as daylighting) and planting was put around it.

== See also ==
Images of the park can be seen on the site GeoGraph using the park's Ordnance Survey National Grid reference.
