= Joseph Hambro =

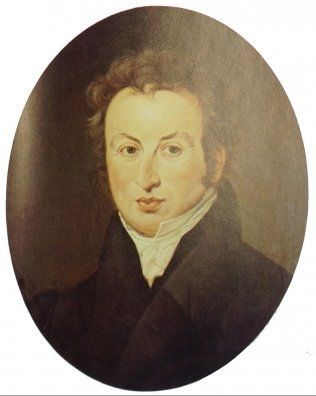
- Born: 4 November 1780; Copenhagen, Denmark
- Died: 3 October 1848 (aged 67); London, England
- Spouse: Marianne von Halle
- Children: Carl Joachim Hambro
- Parent(s): Calmer Hambro; Thobe Levy
- Relatives: Everard Hambro (grandson)

Joseph Hambro (4 November 1780 – 3 October 1848) was a Danish merchant, banker and political advisor.

== Early life ==
Joseph Hambro was born in 1780 in Copenhagen, Denmark. His father, Calmer Hambro, was a Jewish silk and textile merchant, who was born in Rendsburg. At the age of 17, Hambro came to Hamburg where he received his education at Fürst, Haller & Co.

== Career ==
Hambro was a merchant and banker. In 1800, he joined his father's bank and renamed it C. J. Hambro & Son. Under his leadership, the bank gave loans to the Danish government from 1821 to 1827.

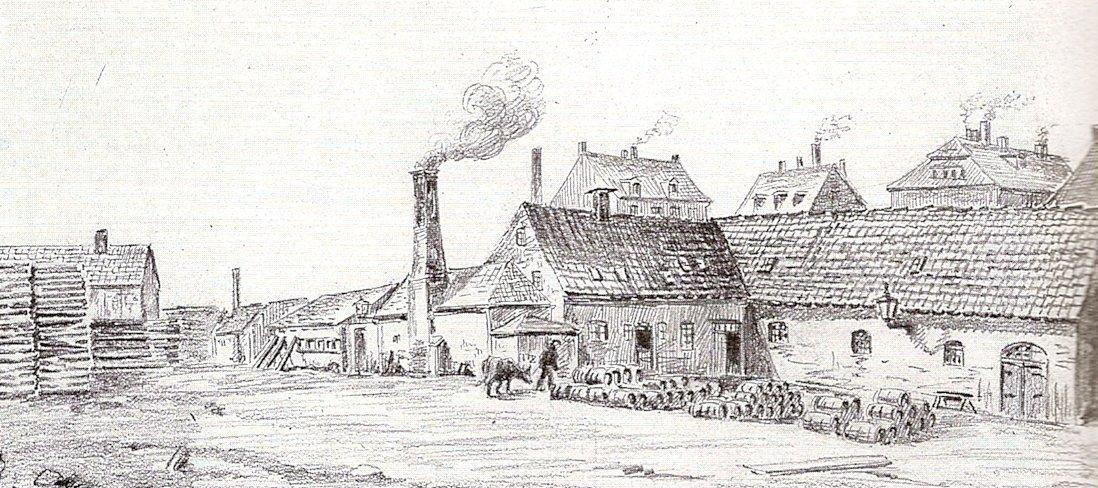
Hambros Plads in Christianshavn, Copenhagen

In circa. 1830, he acquired Bodenhoffs Plads in Christianshavn, from then on known as Hambros Plads, establishing both a rice mill with Denmark's first steam engine, the country's first canned food factory and a bakery at the site.

Hambro became an advisor to Johan Sigismund von Møsting, who served as the Danish Minister of Finance.

== Personal life ==
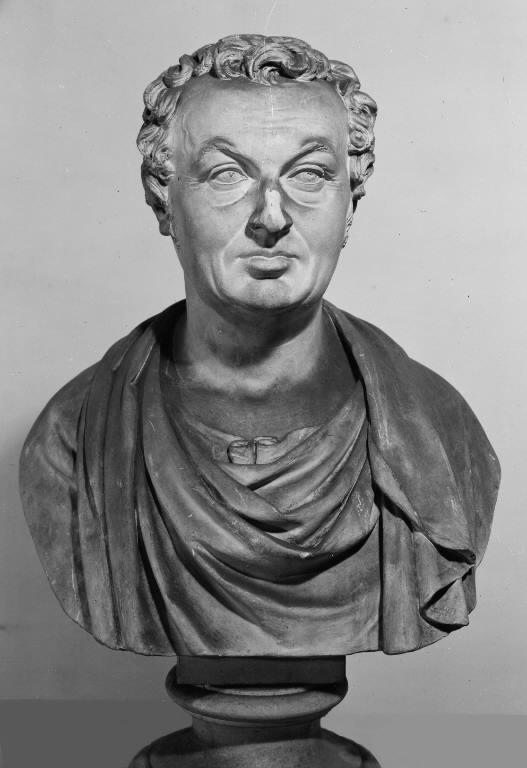
Bust of Joseph Hambro by H. W. Bissen, 1853

He was married to Marianne von Halle (1786–1838), the daughter of Wulf Levin von Halle, a merchant from Copenhagen. They had a son, Carl Joachim Hambro, who moved to London, England, where he founded the Hambros Bank in 1839.

He died in 1848 in London, where he had moved earlier that year.
