= Waverton Investment Management =

Investment management firm

- Company type: Private
- Industry: Finance services
- Founded: 1986; 40 years ago
- Founders: Richard Hambro, Lord Balniel, and David Chaplin
- Headquarters: London, United Kingdom
- Area served: Worldwide
- Key people: Nick Tucker (CEO); David Rosier (Chairman)
- Products: Investments
- AUM: £12.7 billion (2022)
- Website: www.waverton.co.uk

Waverton Investment Management is a British investment management firm headquartered in Westminster, London. As of 2022, the firm had GBP £12.7 billion of assets under management.

== History ==
The firm was established as J. O. Hambro Investment Management in 1986. It was co-founded by Richard Hambro, Lord Balniel, and David Chaplin. It was named in honor of Richard Hambro's father, Jocelyn Olaf Hambro. It is a completely separate company from J.O. Hambro Capital Management.

== Acquisition ==
The firm was acquired by Credit Suisse in 2001, who sold it to Somers Limited in 2013. It was renamed Waverton Investment Management in 2014.

In 2019, the firm acquired London-based independent financial planning and investment advisory business Timothy James & Partners.
