= Kuranakh mine =

Gold mine in Russia

- Location: Siberia, Russia
- Products: Gold

The Kuranakh mine is one of the largest gold mines in Russia and in the world. The mine is located in Siberia. The mine has estimated reserves of 5.04 million oz of gold.
