= Matthew Leslie Jenner =

British entrepreneur

Matthew Leslie Jenner is a British entrepreneur. At present he holds positions in 35 companies, including pawn shops and "pay day loan" businesses. He has been involved in a number of companies which operated tax avoidance schemes, which were subsequently overturned by HMRC.

== Tax avoidance schemes ==
=== The Cup Trust ===
Jenner, and his business partner Anthony Mehigan, set up the Cup Trust charity in 2009. The Cup Trust, which was registered through Mountstar (PTC) Ltd in the Caribbean, received £177 million in donations in a year. Donors to the Cup Trust benefited from tax deductions of up to £55 million. The Cup Trust has requested £46 million in Gift Aid from HM Revenue, arising from the donations which the trust has received. Gift Aid is a facility offered by HMRC for charities to reclaim basic rate tax on donations.

Accounts show that only £135,000 of the £177 million donated to the Cup Trust has been given to good causes. Almost all of the Cup Trust's income was spent buying UK Government bonds.
