= Somers Limited =

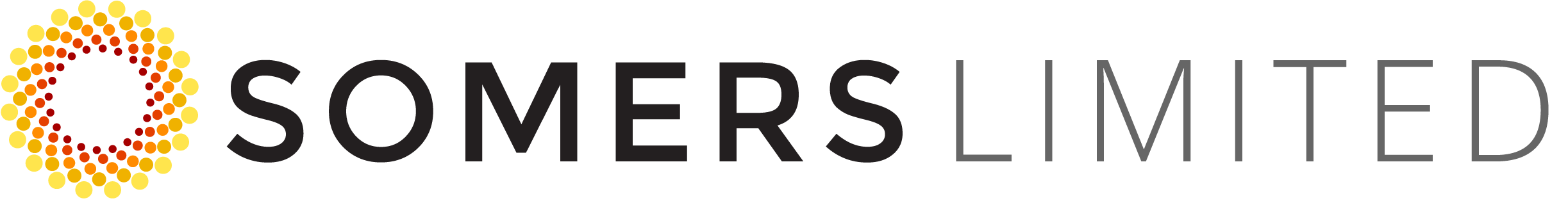
- Company type: Public company
- Traded as: SOM.BH
- Industry: Finance
- Founded: 2012
- Headquarters: Hamilton, Bermuda

Somers Limited is an investment holding company based in Hamilton, Bermuda.

Somers Limited is a financial services investment platform, and the company targets investments primarily in the banking, wealth management and asset financing sectors. Somers Limited has contracted with an external investment manager to manage its investments.

Somers' investments are predominantly in Australia, Bermuda, and the UK.

== Portfolio Summary ==
Somers Limited (Somers) has a relatively concentrated portfolio with investments which are primarily focused on the financial services sector. Geographically, the three key jurisdictions of Australia, Bermuda and the United Kingdom. The Somers' portfolio consists of the following: Resimac Group Limited, W1M, ICM Mobility Group, AK Jensen Group.

Other Investments: Somers Limited has a number of other smaller investments which are a mixture of both unlisted and listed holdings.

== History ==
Somers Limited was founded in 2012 as Bermuda National Limited when Bermuda Commercial Bank, founded in 1969, created a new holding company.

In 2013, Somers made acquisitions including:

- Private and Commercial Finance Group plc, and
- Waverton Investment Management, formerly known as J. O. Hambro Investment Management from Credit Suisse Bank

In the 2014 financial year, Somers' key acquisitions included:

- An investment in Ascot Lloyd Holdings Limited bringing Somers' total potential economic interest to 32.5%
- An increased shareholding in Westhouse Holdings plc to 84.6%
- A 6.6% interest in Merrion Capital
- A 23.8% shareholding in Incol Limited (“Incol”). Incol is a funding platform for financial institutions

In the 2015 financial year, Somers' key transactions included:

- Sale of holding of shares and convertible loan notes in Private and Commercial Finance Group plc to its wholly owned subsidiary, Bermuda Commercial Bank Limited
- Acquisition of an additional 1,222,949 shares in West Hamilton Holdings Limited from BCB bringing Somers’ total holdings to 57.1%

In the 2016 financial year, Somers' key transactions included:

- Acquisition of a 79% shareholding in RESIMAC Limited (subsequently merged with ASX listed Homeloans Limited resulting in a 59% holding in Homeloans), with a combined loan portfolio at the time of A$13 billion
- In September 2016, Somers acquired a 13% economic interest in MJ Hudson

In the 2017 financial year, Somers' key transactions included:

- RESIMAC Limited merged with Homeloans Limited in October 2016, resulting in a 59% shareholding
- Sale of holding of all shares in Ascot Lloyd Holdings Limited, to CPL Bidco Limited

In the 2018 financial year, Somers' key transactions included:

- Acquisition of 38% of AK Jensen's issued shared capital
- Acquisition of 94.5 million shares in PCF Bank from Bermuda Commercial Bank
- Sale of holding of all shares in Merrion Capital Limited, to Cantor Fitzgerald Ireland Limited

In the 2019 financial year, Somers' key transactions included:

- Completion of the sale of holdings in Stockdale Securities and Street Capital Group

In the 2020 financial year, Somers' key transactions included:

- Somers enters an agreement to sell Bermuda Commercial Bank, subject to government and regulatory approvals
- Somers received final consideration for the sale of holdings in Stockdale Securities

In the 2021 financial year, Somers' key transactions included:

- Somers acquires 15% stake in Aura Group a Singapore headquartered, fast-growing alternative investment and wealth management platform.
- Sale of holding of all shares in Bermuda Commercial Bank to Provident Holdings Ltd
- Investment of A$13.2m in Thorn Group

In the 2023 financial year, Somers' key transactions included:

- Somers and related parties acquired a 19.9% strategic investment in Moneyme Limited

In the 2024 financial year, Somers' key transactions included:

- Somers received cash on completion and an 18% economic interest in the combined group post Waverton Investment Management Group Limited's merger with London and Capital Group.

In the 2025 financial year, Somers delisted from the Bermuda Stock Exchange

== Board of directors ==
- Alasdair Younie - Director of ICM Limited, and a Non-Executive Director of West Hamilton Holdings Limited
- Charles Jillings - Chief Executive of ICM Investment Research Limited and ICM Investment Management Limited, and a Director of ICM Limited
- Duncan Saville - Non-Executive Director of Resimac Group Limited

== Sponsorship ==
Somers Limited announced in 2014 a four-year corporate sponsorship of the Bermuda Olympic Association, covering the Olympiad including the 2016 Summer Olympics in Rio, Brazil and the 2018 Winter Olympics in Pyeongchang, South Korea.
