= Calmer Hambro =

Danish merchant and banker (1747–1806)

- Born: Calmer Joachim Levy; 1747; Rendsburg, Schleswig-Holstein, Denmark (later Germany)
- Died: 1806 (aged 58–59); Copenhagen, Denmark
- Spouse: Thobe Levi
- Children: Joseph Hambro; Carl Simon Hambro, Eduard Isaac Hambro, Sophie Hambro.
- Relatives: Isach Joseph Levi (uncle & father-in-law); Carl Joachim Hambro (grandson)

Calmer Hambro (1747–1806) was a Danish merchant and banker.

== Early life ==
Calmer Hambro was born as Calman Joachim Levy in 1747 in Rendsburg, a town of Schleswig-Holstein in Denmark, later acquired by Prussia in the Second Schleswig War of 1864.

He grew up in Hamburg, Germany, which is considered to be his hometown. He changed his surname to Hambro upon moving to Copenhagen in 1778. Although he wanted to be named Hamburg, the registrar misspelt his name, thus renaming him Calmer Hambro.

== Career ==
Hambro took over his father-in-law's business in Copenhagen in 1779. In the Danish census 1801, he was registered living as a handelsman (merchant) in the house Store Købmagergade No. 96 in the Frimands Kvarter neighbourhood, together with his wife and his two sons. He later became a banker to the King of Denmark.

== Personal life ==
Hambro married a cousin, Thobe (Dorothea) Levy (1756–1820), the daughter of Isach Joseph Levi, in Copenhagen in 1778. They had three sons and one daughter, the merchant and banker Joseph Hambro (1780–1848) and his younger twin brothers Carl Simon and Eduard Isaac (born in 1782), the latter moved to Bergen establishing himself as a merchant, and sister Hanne Sophie.

== Death ==
He died in 1806 in Copenhagen, Denmark.

== Legacy ==
His grandson, Carl Joachim Hambro (1807–1877) moved to London, England, where he founded the Hambros Bank in 1839.
