= Petropavlovsk plc =

London-based gold mining company

- Type: Public company ( LSE: POG; MCX: POGR); FTSE 250 component
- Industry: Gold mining
- Founded: 1994
- Headquarters: Listed in London, England. Operates in Russia
- Key people: James Cameron Jr (Chairman); Denis Alexandrov (CEO)
- Products: Gold
- Revenue: ▲$ 988.5 million (2020)
- Operating income: ▼$ 148.0 million (2020)
- Net income: ▼$ (48.9) million (2020)
- Total assets: ▼$ 1,731.0 million (2020)
- Total equity: ▲$ 671.6 million (2020)
- Subsidiaries: IRC Limited
- Website: petropavlovskplc.com

Petropavlovsk plc (formerly Peter Hambro Mining plc) is a London-based gold mining company with operations in Russia. The company is listed on the London Stock Exchange.

== History ==
The group was founded by Peter Hambro and Pavel Maslovskiy in 1994 as an Anglo-Russian venture to develop a highly-prospective, under-developed gold project in the Amur region, Russian far east.

In 2002, the company was first listed on the Alternative Investment Market. Peter Hambro Mining fully acquired Aricom, a business formed by Peter Hambro and Pavel Maslovskiy and operating in the Amur Region, in April 2009. It was also first fully listed on the London Stock Exchange in April 2009.

In September 2009, the company changed its name from Peter Hambro Mining plc to Petropavlovsk plc, retaining the POG stock exchange code, in order to reinforce its Russian focus.

In October 2010, the company floated its non-precious metals division (the assets previously held by Aricom plc) on the Stock Exchange of Hong Kong as IRC Ltd.

In 2017, founder Peter Hambro stepped down as chairman of the company and Pavel Maslovskiy resigned under pressure from a group of shareholders led by Viktor Vekselberg. However, following a vote taken at the company's annual general meeting on 29 June 2018, it was announced that Pavel Maslovskiy would return to the board of Petropavlovsk along with Sir Roderic Lyne and Robert Jenkins. Kenges Rakishev, the largest shareholder with 22% of the shares in the company, supported the vote and the move to appoint the new directors.

In August 2020, following boardroom changes that June which were not supported by Prosperity Capital Management, Petropavlovsk announced the appointment of an interim chief executive. Maksim Meshcheriakov, a Russian executive, would replace co-founder Pavel Maslovskiy, who had left the group. Petropavlovsk also named James Cameron, an existing independent director, as its new chairman.

The immediate priority of the board of directors of Petropavlovsk PLC would be to ensure the ongoing stability of operations and to strengthen governance of the company following a boardroom tussle.

Doubts about the competence and independence of the interim chief executive, Maksim Meshcheriakov, were voiced by the Pokrovskiy Mine labor union. The managers of the company's key mines requested the Board to disclose important information regarding the interim CEO. In their letter they wrote that he was not independent, did not have the relevant mining experience of more than 17 years, had been involved in questionable transactions and may still be regarded as a politically exposed person.

On 26 August 2020 Meshcheriakov and a team led by him invaded the Moscow office of the Pokrovskiy Mine. After Meshcheriakov spent a day spent in the office, the IT systems and software that provide the daily work were destroyed, the submission of reports to state regulatory bodies was interrupted and the HR-department's database was destroyed completely. Part of the data containing proprietary information disappeared and was probably stolen, the other part was destroyed.

In October 2020 it was announced that Meshcheryakov would face a Russian criminal probe following his forced entry of the company's Moscow office. A letter, signed by Alexander Fedorov, vice-chairman of the investigating committee, referred to "indications of criminal activities" under two parts of Russia's criminal code relating to theft and illegal entry.

In December 2021, Petropavlovsk, sold its 31.1% stake in IRC Limited to Gazprombank (24.07%) and to Dmitry Bakatin (5.79%).

In July 2022, the company decided to file for administration after one of its lenders, Gazprombank, demanded repayment of a $201m (£169.3m) loan and Petropavlovsk was unable to meet the demand because it was prohibited from doing so by the sanction regime against Russia.

== Operations ==
=== Mines ===
The Group's principal assets are four hard-rock gold mines in the Amur region, Russian far east:

==== Pioneer ====
Pioneer is the Group’s largest mine and one of the largest gold mines in the Russian far east. The Group acquired a licence to explore, develop and mine the Pioneer deposit in 2001. The mine was commissioned in April 2008 with the installation of a 0.7Mtpa milling line. Since then, the plant has undergone further expansion to reach the current capacity of 6.6Mtpa. The mine still remains highly prospective as new licence areas surrounding the original mine site are still being explored.

==== Pokrovskiy ====
Pokrovskiy is an open-pit gold mine located in the western part of the Amur region, approximately 10 km from the nearest station on the Trans-Siberian Railway and 35 km from Pioneer. It is one of the largest producing gold mines in the Amur region by annual production. The group acquired the licence to explore, develop and mine the Pokrovskiy deposit in 1994, when it was still at a very early stage of development. The mine became operational five years later in 1999, when heap-leaching facilities were added. The RIP processing plant was commissioned in 2002 and subsequently expanded to its current capacity of 1.7Mtpa in 2004. To date, the Pokrovskiy mine has produced over 1.6Moz of gold. The mine is the site of the Group's pressure oxidation ("POX") processing hub.

==== Malomir ====
Malomir is the group's first large-scale mine located in the north-east of the Amur region. Acquired in 2003 as a greenfield site, Malomir was commissioned on target in 2010 and the plant was expanded in July that year, despite the project's remote location.

==== Albyn ====
The Albyn licence area was acquired in 2005 as a greenfield site and was commissioned on target in November 2011. Albyn remains one of the group's most prospective projects, with exploration continuing to yield positive results.

== Training ==
In 2007, the group established a training college close to the Pokrovskiy mine. The college is certified to offer training in more than 40 mining professions.

== Carbon footprint ==
Petropavlovsk reported Total CO2e emissions (Direct + Indirect) for 31 December 2020 at 454 Kt (-0.73 /-0.2% y-o-y).

Petropavlovsk's Total CO2e emissions (Direct + Indirect) (in kilotonnes)
Dec 2018	Dec 2019	Dec 2020
428	455	454
