= Carl Joachim Hambro (banker) =

Danish banker

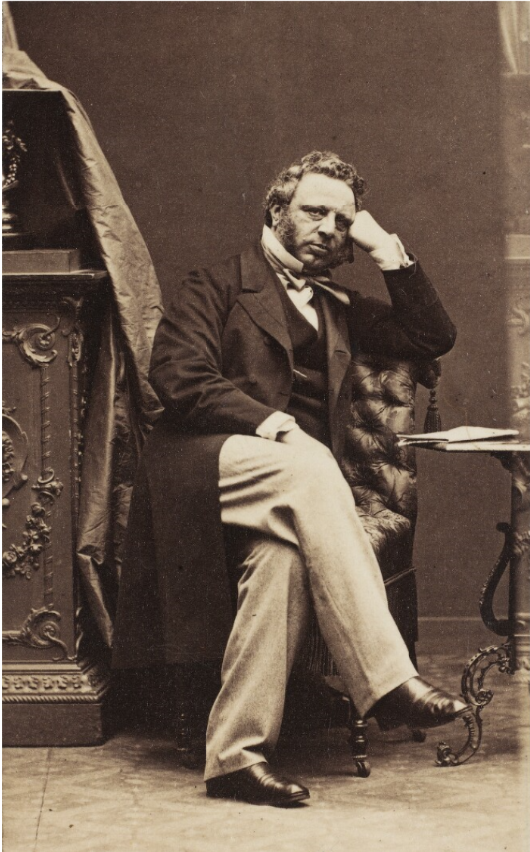
- Born: 23 November 1807; Copenhagen, Denmark
- Died: 27 November 1877 (aged 70)
- Occupation: Banker
- Spouses: Caroline Gostenhofer; Eliza Greathead
- Children: Percival Hambro; Everard Hambro; Charles Hambro
- Parent(s): Joseph Hambro; Marianne von Halle
- Relatives: Calmer Hambro (paternal grandfather); Charles Eric Hambro (grandson)

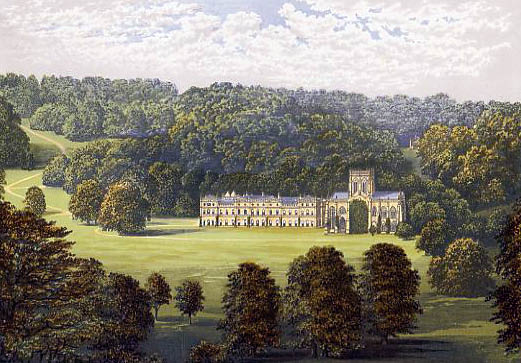
Milton Abbey, late 1800s

Baron Carl Joachim Hambro (23 November 1807 – 27 November 1877) was a Danish banker. He was the founder of Hambros Bank, one of the United Kingdom's largest investment banks.

== Early life ==
Carl Joachim Hambro was born in 1807 in Copenhagen, Denmark. He was the son of Marianne von Halle and Joseph Hambro (1780–1848). The family lineage can be traced to Rendsburg, Schleswig-Holstein, in the 1720s. His paternal grandfather Calmer Hambro (1747–1806) had migrated to Copenhagen where he became a trade merchant in 1779. In 1814, aged seven, Carl Hambro was sent to live with Danish zoology professor Johan Reinhardt and his wife. In 1822, Hambro, who was born into a Jewish family, was baptised and confirmed into the Christian religion at the behest of his foster parents.

== Career ==
Hambro left school in 1824 and worked in Le Havre, Antwerp and Bremen as well as North America. He returned to Copenhagen in 1829 and joined his father, Joseph Hambro, managing an international trading house established by his grandfather. In 1832, they moved to London and in 1839 established Hambros Bank there. During the 1850s he was responsible for arranging various British Government loan stock issues enabling the bank to prosper. He was made a Baron by King Frederik VII of Denmark in 1851.

== Personal life ==
In 1833, he married Caroline Gostenhofer and together they went on to have three sons: Charles J. T. Hambro, Percival Hambro and Everard Hambro. In 1852 he acquired Milton Abbey in Dorset and made it his home. In 1861 Hambro married, secondly, Eliza Frances Turner (1824/25-1919), widow of Hervey Harris Greathe(a)d (1817-1857), BCS, political agent, Commissioner of Meerut, and one of the daughters of Thomas Jacob Turner, BCS, formerly of Worthy Park in Martyr Worthy parish, Hampshire. Hambro died at his home at Milton Abbey in 1877.

== Legacy ==
One grandson, Charles Eric Hambro, inherited Hambro's Bank from Everard, while another, Major General Sir Percival Otway Hambro, joined the military, fighting in the Second Boer War in the 16th Lancers under Field Marshal General Lord Roberts, as well as taking part in the First World War.
