= Hambros Bank =

UK bank based in London

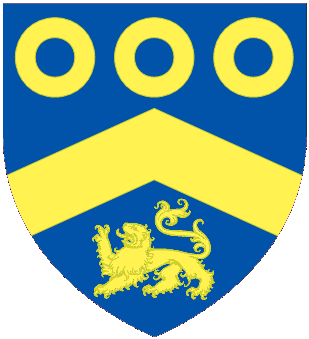
- Type: Public
- Industry: Banking
- Founded: 1839
- Defunct: 2016
- Fate: Acquired
- Successor: Société Générale
- Headquarters: London, UK
- Key people: Chips Keswick (Chairman)

Hambros Bank was a British bank based in London. The Hambros bank was a specialist in Anglo-Scandinavian business with expertise in trade finance and investment banking, and was the sole banker to the Scandinavian kingdoms for many years. The bank was sold in 1998, and today survives only in the name of the private banking division of the French group Société Générale.

== History ==
=== Early history ===
Hambros was founded by the Danish merchant and banker Carl Joachim Hambro in London in 1839 as C. J. Hambro & Son. During the 1850s he was responsible for arranging various British Government loan stock issues enabling the bank to prosper. He also organised a loan for King Frederick VI of Denmark as well as for Camillo Benso, Count of Cavour to finance the unification of Italy.

=== Pre-war and Second World War ===
After merging with the British Bank of Northern Commerce (owned by Enskilda Banken and a number of Scandinavian savings banks) in 1921 the name was changed to Hambros Bank, and the firm expanded. As a result, in 1926 a bigger head office was constructed at 41 Bishopsgate, where the bank remained until 1988. The 1930 depression affected the bank's international business and it concentrated on domestic lending and Scandinavia. During World War II, Sir Charles Hambro raised finance for the Norwegian exiled government and was also the head of the Special Operations Executive.

=== Post-war development ===
After the Second World War, Hambros became also known as the 'diamond bank' with its thriving activity in financing the diamond industry and its trade. Hambros was one of the top three banks in the Euromarket by the mid-1960s. In 1967 the private banking and trust operations were expanded offshore and new offices were opened in Jersey and Guernsey to take advantage of the offshore tax benefits.

The 1970s marked Hambros' expansion into new areas of financial services – in particular, asset management, investment management for third parties, investment funds and insurance. An offshore private banking and trust operation was established in 1981 in Gibraltar to complement the offices in London, Jersey and Guernsey.

=== Shipping crises and Hilmar Reksten ===
In the mid-1970s the bank was badly hit by the shipping crisis and repeatedly hindered by its relationship with the Norwegian shipping magnate Hilmar Reksten. Under the direction of Charles Perrin, who started his career in the bank as Assistant Company Secretary, the bank defended itself against litigation from his trustees in bankruptcy and the Norwegian government on and off for nearly 25 years, including two substantial out of court settlements.

=== Hambro family break up ===
The bank decided to enter the securities market buying Strauss Turnbull, a stockbroker, in March 1984.

In 1986, the Hambro Trust, the majority shareholder in the bank, was dissolved and the family went their separate ways. Lord Hambro (with his children Clare, Charles, and Alex) stayed with the bank, while Jocelyn Hambro (with his children Rupert, Richard, and James) set up J O Hambro and Sons; Jocelyn Hambro and his sons were reported to be successful in their new businesses.

These changes resulted in substantially less Hambro family influence in the banking group and, in July 1997, in the promotion of Chips Keswick to Chairman of the Bank, and Charles Perrin (of Reksten fame) to Vice Chairman and later CEO.

=== Sale to Société Générale ===
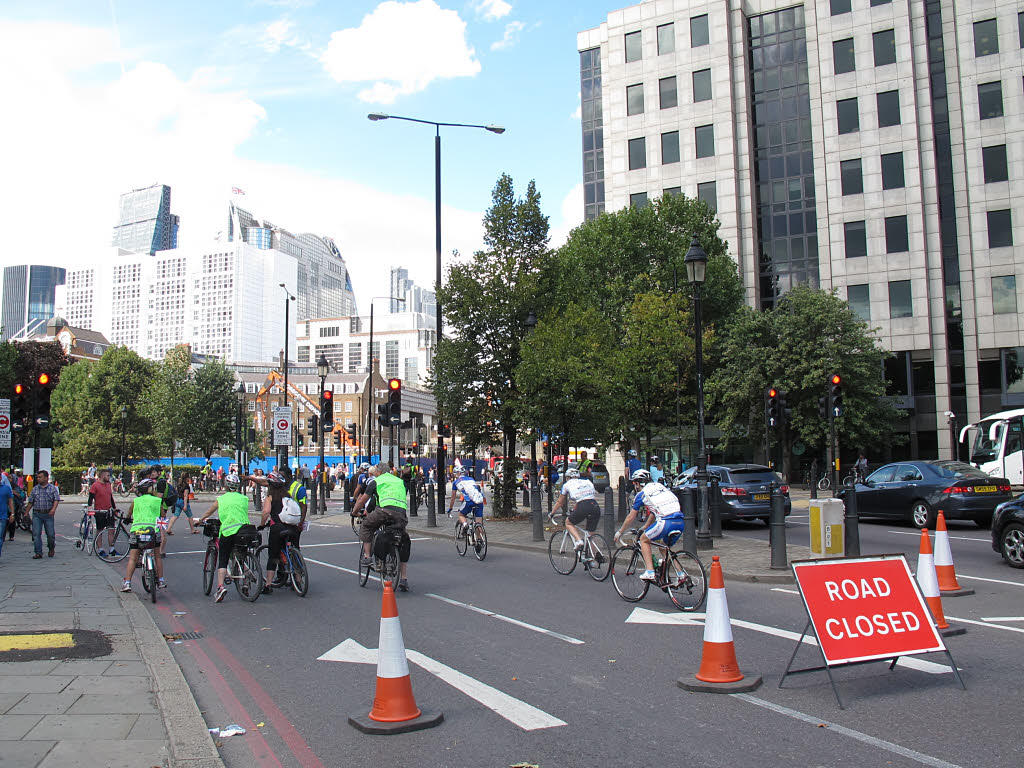
The former Hambros head office at 41 Tower Hill (on the right in the photograph)

By the end of the decade Hambros had 1,400 staff, 900 of whom were based at 41 Tower Hill in London. In February 1998 the Hambros PLC board recommended a sale of Hambros Bank Ltd to the French bank Société Générale, which the majority of the shareholders accepted. Chips Keswick was the prime promoter of the Société Générale takeover together with his Vice Chairman Charles Perrin, who was the last CEO of Hambros Bank Ltd.

=== Formation of boutiques and spin-offs ===
Several boutiques and spin-offs originated from or arose out of the ashes of Hambros Banking Group in the late 1990s. These included JO Hambro and Sons (Jocelyn Hambro and his sons), Hambro Magan Corporate Finance (JO Hambro and Mr Magan), J O Hambro Capital Management (James Hambro), JO Hambro Investment Management (Rupert, Richard and James Hambro), Rupert Hambro & Partners, Firecrest Hambro (Charles Edward Hambro Jr), EC Hambro Rabben & Partners (Clare Hambro and Eivind Rabben), Duke Street Capital (Edmund Truell, ex Hambro European Ventures CEO) and STAR Capital Partners (Tony Mallin, ex Vice Chairman of Hambros Bank).

Getty Images was formed by two former Hambros Bank corporate finance directors (Mark Getty/Jonathan Klein). One of the largest companies formed by the family was Peter Hambro Mining and Gold - now renamed Petropavlovsk and listed on the stock exchange in London.

=== SG Hambros ===
Logo as SG Hambros

Société Générale sold Hambros PLC, including its private equity and investment side, to Investec, a South African bank in May 1998. The Hambros core private banking activities, which had been retained by Société Générale, was renamed SG Hambros Bank & Trust in November 1998.

In 2006, the bank was involved with a complex tax avoidance scheme with more than 400 investors, operated by Matthew Leslie Jenner of Jersey-based NT Advisors. Subsequently, the scheme was challenged and shutdown by HM Revenue and Customs leaving the investors facing a £190m bill. The bank was renamed SG Hambros Bank in January 2007. It bought ABN AMRO's Private Banking activities in Gibraltar in September 2008 and was voted Best Wealth Manager for Alternative Investment in the Investors Chronicle Wealth Management Awards in November 2009.

SG Hambros merged with Kleinwort Benson in November 2016 to form Kleinwort Hambros.

== Sources ==
- Johns, Richard Anthony (2013). Tax Havens and Offshore Finance: A Study of Transnational Economic Development. Bloomsbury. ISBN 978-1472505880.
- Roberts, Janine (2007). Glitter & Greed: The Secret World of the Diamond Empire. Disinformation. ISBN 978-1932857603.
