= Trond Andresen =

Norwegian academic

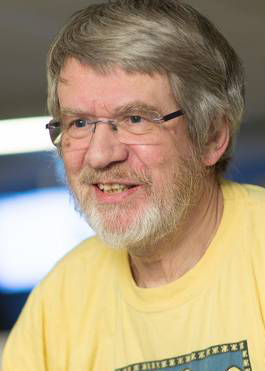
- Born: 30 April 1947 (age 79)
- Occupation: Associate Professor of Cybernetics
- Known for: Academic, politician, writer

Trond Andresen (born 30 April 1947) is a Norwegian political activist, debater, and engineer. Trained as an engineer, he was an associate professor of cybernetics at the Norwegian University of Science and Technology (NTNU). Andresen has a long history of political activism, originally as a marxist-leninist and member of the Workers' Communist Party. From the early 2000s, he became increasingly known for his antisemitic writings, including as an invited regular columnist for the newspaper Klassekampen from 2000 to 2016 and editor of its debate forum from 2008. Andresen left the Red Party in 2009 amid calls for his expulsion from the party over his antisemitic views and has pivoted to the far right, announcing his support for Marine Le Pen in 2016. In 2017 Andresen met with Norwegian neo-Nazi politician Hans Jørgen Lysglimt Johansen, and Andresen said they broadly agreed on what he called the most important questions, including the claim that The Holocaust has been exaggerated. In 2025 Andresen became a member of the pro-Russian Peace and Justice party. Later that year his membership was suspended by the board, which proposed to expel him from the party on account of his "racist activity" directed at Jews. Andresen then left the party before he could be formally expelled.

== Career ==
He earned the M.Sc. degree in electrical engineering at NTH (now NTNU) in 1973, and has been assistant professor at NTNU since 1982. He was elected as a member of the university board in 1999, serving one term. He earned the dr.philos. degree in 2018 with the dissertation On the Dynamics of Money Circulation, Creation and Debt – a Control Systems Approach and was thus promoted to associate professor.

== Political activity ==
Andresen has been a member of a number of left-wing organisations in Norway, and was a co-founder of the Red Electoral Alliance (RV) political party in 1973. In 1982, he founded a left-wing radio station affiliated with RV, Radio RV, and served as its editor until 1996. He has also freelanced for the NRK. Andresen was a columnist for the left-wing daily Klassekampen from 2000 to 2016, and also for some time moderated its online forum, launched in 2008. He was also very active in hosting and participating in the debate about the newspaper's strategy that ended with the replacement of then-editor Paul Bjerke by Jon Michelet by the owners of the paper, the Workers' Communist Party, in 1996.

Due to his membership and activity in several communist organisations, Andresen was under surveillance by the Police Surveillance Agency from 1970 until the early 1990s, and has published his dossier, which he obtained following the inquiries into the Police Surveillance Agency's activities, on the Internet.

In February 2009, Andresen left the Red party, following long-standing criticism of his antisemitic views and calls for his expulsion from the party.

In recent years, Andresen has been a vocal critic of Israel. He was one of the signatories of the petition to the university board that NTNU boycott Israel, an initiative which received worldwide media attention. The initiative by 34 NTNU professors eventually failed in the university board.

Historian Kjetil B. Simonsen argued in 2011 that "in recent years, Andresen has authored a number of posts and articles containing clear antisemitic accusations, in which Jews are stereotyped and attacked as Jews." In his book Ingen er uskyldig: Antisemittisme på venstresiden, historian Torkel Brekke discusses Andresen's history of antisemitic writings and his increasing pivot toward far-right alliances. In 2017 Andresen met with Hans Jørgen Lysglimt Johansen. "In the debate that followed, Andresen said he broadly agreed with him on the most important questions, such as the claim that The Holocaust has been exaggerated", Brekke writes.

In April 2015, he was asked by the Norwegian Confederation of Trade Unions not to bring a poster to the International Workers' Day stating that "whining about anti-Semitism is a derailment tactic", that he had used for several years. In 2016 he announced his support for Marine Le Pen.

In 2025 Andresen became a member of the pro-Russian Peace and Justice party. Later that year his membership was suspended by the board, which proposed to expel him from the party on account of his "racist activity" directed at Jews. Andresen then left the party before he could be formally expelled.

== Awards ==
In 2006, Andresen received the SINTEF Prize for Excellence in Teaching.
