= Hilde Haugsgjerd =

Norwegian newspaper editor

Hilde Haugsgjerd (born 7 July 1952) is a Norwegian newspaper editor.

She was born in Oslo. She was the party leader of the Red Electoral Alliance from 1979 to 1981, and was married to the party's first leader Sigurd Allern from 1972 to 1977.

She worked as a journalist in Klassekampen and Dagbladet, as well as information director of Rikshospitalet, before becoming a newspaper editor. She edited Dagsavisen from 2001 to 2004 as the first female editor of a national Norwegian newspaper, and then Aftenposten Aften from 2004 to 2008. In 2008 she became acting chief editor of Aftenposten since editor Hans Erik Matre underwent cancer treatment, and in 2009 she became the editor on a permanent basis.

Party political offices
Preceded by Pål Steigan	Leader of the Red Electoral Alliance; 1979–1981	Succeeded by Finn Sjue
Media offices
Preceded by Steinar Hansson	Chief editor of Dagsavisen; 2001–2004	Succeeded by Arne Strand (acting)
Preceded by Hans Erik Matre	Chief editor of Aftenposten; 2008–2013 (acting 2008–2009)	Succeeded by Espen Egil Hansen
