= Klassekampen =

Norwegian left-wing daily newspaper

- Type: Daily newspaper
- Owner(s): Red Party (Norway) (19.6%); Foreningen Klassekampens venner (17.5%); Norwegian Union of Municipal and General Employees (15%); United Federation of Trade Unions (5%); Mater AS (4.7%); Oktoberstiftelsen (4.7%); Industri Energi (5%); Others (28.5%)
- Editor: Mari Skurdal
- Founded: 1969
- Political alignment: Revolutionary socialism Formerly: Maoism
- Headquarters: Oslo, Norway
- Circulation: 37,000 (2025)
- ISSN: 0805-3839 (print); 1500-5313 (web)
- Website: www.klassekampen.no

Klassekampen (lit. 'The Class Struggle') is a Norwegian daily newspaper published in print and online. Its tagline is "The daily newspaper of the Left". The paper's net circulation was 37,000 in 2025, and it has around 111,000 daily readers on paper (160,000 on Saturdays). This makes it the third-largest Norwegian print newspaper, based on readership. Since 2018, the chief editor has been Mari Skurdal.

Klassekampen started in early 1969 as a monthly periodical published by a group of Oslo-based Marxist-Leninists, with Pål Steigan as a key founder and Anders M. Andersen as the first editor. Part of the alternative media landscape of the era, it promoted the positions of the Workers' Communist Party (AKP; founded 1973) and its predecessors. Klassekampen became a weekly in January 1973, a bi-weekly in January 1976, and a daily newspaper in April 1977. It was the official organ of the AKP until April 1991. Its mission statement now describes itself as "revolutionary socialist." As with most Norwegian newspapers, it relies on financial support from the Norwegian government.

Klassekampen has received a varied reception over time. During its early history it promoted a strongly ideological Marxist–Leninist view of society, although its party alignment softened during the 1990s, especially after Paul Bjerke became editor. It has been commended for its in-depth cultural coverage, labor-oriented reporting, and platforming of voices outside the mainstream media consensus. At the same time, it has faced criticism for promoting Russian propaganda narratives, anti-LGBTQ views including homophobia in the 1970s and transphobia in the 2020s, and, for several decades from the 1970s to the 2010s, for antisemitism, notably with Trond Andresen serving as a regular columnist and editor of the paper's debate forum, frequently writing antisemitic articles, for 16 years until 2016. Its editor has denied accusations of transphobia.

== History ==
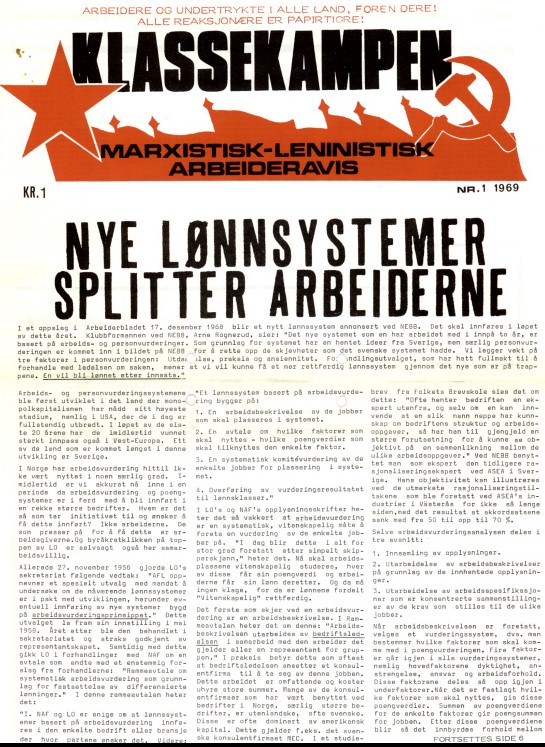
Front page of the first issue (1969)

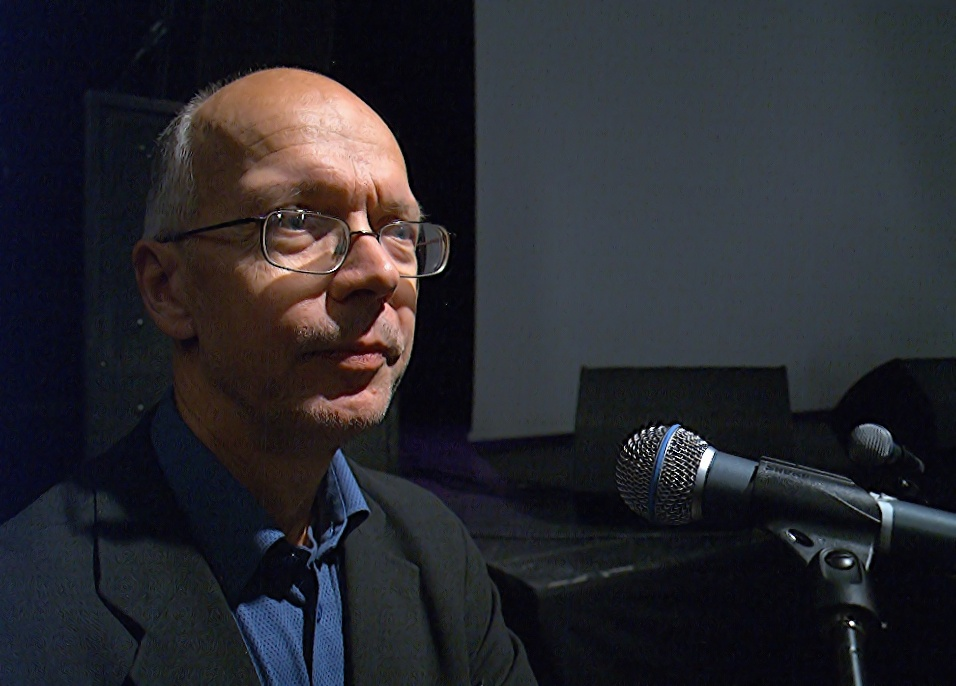
Pål Steigan co-founded Klassekampen as a monthly periodical in 1969 and during his leadership the Workers' Communist Party developed it into a daily newspaper in 1977

=== 1969–1972: Monthly paper for the marxist-leninist movement ===
Klassekampen was initiated in 1968 by a group of young communists, members of SUF(m-l), the youth organization of the socialist Sosialistisk Folkeparti (SF). Pål Steigan, Tron Øgrim and Sigmund Grønmo were key figures, The first issue was published on February 7, 1969, coinciding with the annual convention of the SF, at which a left-wing opposition broke with the party, as did SUF (m-l). In the first period the paper was published as a monthly periodical by "a group of marxist-leninists". According to Steigan, the name was proposed by Øgrim, the name indicating that it intended to play a larger role than being the monthly periodical of a youth organization. The newspaper's stated goal was to strengthen the Marxist–Leninist movement and lay the foundations for a new communist party in Norway. At the same time, it set itself the goal of becoming a working class newspaper.

As a monthly, Klassekampen had no paid staff. The editorial work, the printing as well as sales were carried out by volunteers. The first printing press was financed mostly by young people taking summer jobs or being newspaper couriers (for other newspapers) before school hours. Due to the progress of the m-l-movement and its high level of activity, sales and circulation increased rapidly: the first issue in 1969 was printed in 3,500 copies. The circulation passed 10,000 in 1970, and 20,000 in 1971. Labour Day was always an important sales day, and the May 1st issue of 1972 was published in 45,000.

During the period as a monthly newspaper, Klassekampen also published a number of extra issues on current issues and leaflet-like printed matter. From 1972 the paper was officially linked to the Marxist–Leninist Groups (MLG), which was a forerunner of the Workers' Communist Party (AKP (m-l)). At the same time, fundraising and recruitment of subscribers was started with a plan of weekly publication.

=== 1973–1976: Weekly newspaper for AKP(m-l) ===
In January 1973, Klassekampen became a weekly newspaper. Shortly afterwards, it became the formal party organ for the newly formed AKP (m-l).

As a weekly, Klassekampen got its own editorial offices in Oslo for the first time, as well as a paid editorial staff. Still, much of the volunteer spirit continued, with groups of party members and sympathizers contributing in special editorial fields. In 1974, a campaign was launched to link "workers' correspondents" to the newspaper. After two years as a weekly, it was summarized that a third of the newspaper was written by the permanent editorial staff, a third by the volunteer staff and a third by workers' correspondents and readers. The proportion of workplace reports doubled from 1973 to 1974.

The winter of 1973 the weekly newspaper had a circulation of 13,000. The fall of 1974 it had increased to 19,000 and two years later 27,000. During the years 1973–1976 11,000 new subscribers were enrolled, and door-to-door sales were effectively organized. From January 1976, Klassekampen was published twice a week, as an escalation before the transition to daily publications. In order to prepare for this transition, a major fundraising campaign was also carried out for investing in the paper's own rotary printing plant. The "rotation campaign" started little by little in 1974 and was not completed until just before the daily newspaper was launched. At that time, NOK 5,631,000 had been collected.

In the pre-daily period, Klassekampen disclosed several classified military documents. In May 1971, it was shown that a NATO exercise had exemplified revolutionary groups, Vietnam War activists and trade unionists as enemies of the state. During an exercise in 1973, the paper disclosed that opponents of NATO membership and student groups had been "assigned" this role. In 1976, the paper carried a series of articles by Jon Michelet about the Soviet presence at Svalbard, suggesting that the Soviet Union might be constructing a military base at Cape Heer, thus violating the Svalbard Treaty. These reports were later developed into Michelet's novel Orion's Belt and a movie with the same name.

=== 1977–1991: Daily newspaper for AKP (m-l) ===
From April 1, 1977, Klassekampen switched to daily publication (except Sundays). At that time, the rotary press and editorial offices were installed on Bryn in Oslo. In the first years as a daily newspaper, Klassekampen was edited strictly according to party guidelines.

The operation of the daily newspaper was more resource-intensive than anticipated, not least financially. Income from advertising was scarce. In addition, AKP (m-l) had adopted a policy of "self-support" and therefore did not accept the state support that Klassekampen was entitled to. The newspaper was to be built entirely on the support of the readers. This policy hit the wall in 1978, and bankruptcy was just around the corner. A new fundraiser avoided immediate collapse, but the party had to accept state aid. In November 1979, Klassekampen could announce that "the daily is saved!" This of course had a cost: The paper was cut from 16 to 12 pages most days, and the staff was reduced heavily. District offices in Bergen, Trondheim and Tromsø had to close, and special editions in Sàmi, English and Spanish were stopped, as were publications aimed specially at immigrant workers and at farmers/fishermen.

The party had also decided that the paper should build up its own courier service. Unpaid volunteers delivered the newspaper to the subscribers in major cities every evening or night. This was partly for economic reasons, partly as a security measure – AKP did not want to hand over the list of subscribers to someone else. (The parliamentary "Lund Report" concerning the Norwegian secret services later confirmed that subscribing to Klassekampen could be a reason for registration.) The courier system meant great strain on the party organization that, literally, carried the newspaper. From late 1979 the system was discontinued in most of Norway, but in some parts of Oslo it was effective for a decade.

In 1977, criminal charges were brought against then editor Finn Sjue for the paper's disclosures of secret NATO exercise telegrams. Two years later he was sentenced to ten days in prison or a fine of NOK 2,500. The sentence was later confirmed by the Supreme Court with a 3–2 vote.

During the 1980s, Klassekampen managed to get national acclaim for its journalism in certain focus areas. Journalist Per Bangsund specialized in the growth of right wing extremism and neo-Nazism in Norway and had contacts regarding this within the secret services. A group for investigative journalism (with among others Alf R. Jacobsen) was established, possibly the first in Norway. A focus area for this group was tax evasions among business people and top politicians. Finn Sjue, now as a journalist, dug into illegal or semi-illegal surveillance practices by the secret services towards organizations, politicians and activists on the left. Furthermore, the paper had broad international coverage, partly through AKP's party contacts, but through the years also through extensive travel activities by its own staff. The Middle East, Horn of Africa, Eastern Europe, Central America and Northern Ireland was prioritized. In 1983, journalist Kjell Gjerseth received the Narvesen Prize, at that time the highest ranked journalism award in Norway, for his reports from Afghanistan in the early years of the Soviet occupation.

The Lund Report in 1996 stated that the telephones in Klassekampen's offices had been tapped by the Secret Services from 1976 until 1979. Furthermore, the names of employees, contributors, subscribers and street vendors had been registered.

In 1979, Sigurd Allern was hired as editor for a new period. He held this position until 1995 and was vital in the editorial development of the daily. Also being a member of the AKP central committee, he managed pragmatically to professionalize the paper without creating too much discontent in the party. The editorial directive was in effect discontinued. Still, there were some conflict points between the party and the staff. In 1984–1985 this culminated, when a group of journalists organized a strike protesting on the paper's employment policy. The strike lasted only a couple of hours, but led to a long-lasting internal conflict in the paper and the party. At the same time, the Norwegian Graphical Union decided to exclude all members at Duplotrykk, Klassekampen's print shop, on the grounds that they had accepted hours and pay grade outside of the tariff regulations.

=== 1991–1999: New orientation ===
==== The Allern years ====
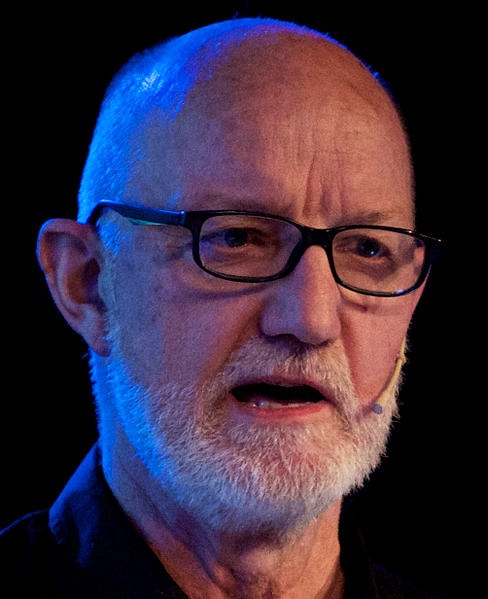
Sigurd Allern

The process of liberating the paper from party ties, peaked in April 1991, when Klassekampen no longer reckoned itself party organ of AKP. A new purpose clause stated that the paper should carry serious critical journalism with "disclosures of all kinds of exploitation, oppression and environmental destruction" as well as inspire and contribute to "ideological criticism, organizing and political struggle" from a "revolutionary, socialist viewpoint". This change had been approved by the party, that however still would own 80 percent of the shares in the publishing company with the same name. This "liberation process" followed the general line among Norwegian papers, as also conservative and Labour media gained more independence in these years.

Helped by state support, frequent fundraising campaigns and an increasing circulation, the 1980s had passed without any financial catastrophes, but the economy was still tight. A system with regular contributions from the readers had been started in 1983 (Else Berg memorial fund). In late 1991 this was formalized into the support organization Friends of Klassekampen, that was given the remaining 20 percent of the shares and a seat in the company board. Together with a big fundraiser this provided means for a renewal in design and editorial focus. The circulation increased to more than 10,000 in 1992, but then Klassekampen lost momentum. It did not manage to use the 1994 referendum on EU membership, where the paper was among with a clear stand against, for increased growth. In early 1995, Duplotrykk – the paper's own printing company – went bankrupt. After this, Klassekampen has been printed by commercial suppliers.

Internal conflicts in the staff were frequent. Editor Sigurd Allern had a rather authoritarian style of leadership, that did not suit the liberated situation and hindered the creative capabilities of the staff. An expansion of the Saturday edition in 1994 was forced through by Allern against the will of the journalists, the marketing department, the CFO and a minority of the board. He (supported by the majority of the board) also pursued a strategy of a still broader ownership and had talks with Kristen Nygaard, that had led the No to EU movement and with the Socialist Left Party (SV) and their then weekly, Ny Tid.

==== The Bjerke years ====
Main owner AKP had, as many of its sister parties from the 1970s, declined during the 80s. A further setback came in 1991, when its election front Rød Valgallianse became an independent organization and many party members chose to quit AKP and concentrate on RV. Among these were several of those sympathetic to Allern's strategy, while the skepticism toward the editor in the rest-AKP became obvious. In 1995, Allern took the consequences of this and resigned. Paul Bjerke, who had been Allern's deputy, was appointed new editor. He had worked in the paper since 1982. His work style was very opposite to his predecessor's. In a portrait interview in 1997 with the headline "Mumble mumble" he described himself as "somewhat over the edge antisocial".

Bjerke soon had to accept reductions in staff and number of pages. His proposed strategy was to meet the problems with expansion. This line was supported by Aksel Nærstad, who from late 1994 had been leading the company board. Nærstad argued that it would be possible to reach a circulation of 15,000 within few years, and that a capital increase of ten million NOK could be obtained provided AKP reduced its ownership. AKP considered these to be numbers without links to reality and instead suggested a discussion on what could be done to fulfill the paper's purpose and strengthen Klassekampen as a "revolutionary, radical, indignant on behalf of the poor, critical to the system and foresighted" newspaper. The national convention of AKP in May 1997 was positive to reducing the party's ownership, but also stated that changing the name or the purpose clause was unacceptable.

Criticism of the paper did not only arise from the AKP leadership and cadre. In 1996, an internet forum named KK-forum was established by outsiders as an attempt on participatory democracy, but this was not welcomed by the paper and its staff, who mostly refused to participate in open polemics. Around the same time there was a notable change in Klassekampen's culture pages with more high-brow intellectual essays that seemed uninteresting and unavailable for the common reader. This led to heavy discussions. Early 1997 Nærstad and Bjerke chose – against AKP's will – to go public with their suggested strategy. This led to Nærstad being sacked as leader of the board, and also to discussions about Bjerke's position. During the spring and summer several initiatives were taken to solve the situation, but there was an increasing lack of confidence between the groups.

In September 1997, parliamentary elections were due. For four years RV had had its first representative, Erling Folkvord, but polls indicated that he was in danger of losing his seat. Klassekampen had always been supporting RV at elections, but now party members felt the help to be somewhat lacking. A few days before the elections the conflict around the newspaper became public as other media claimed that AKP would fire Bjerke. AKP denied that this was the plan. On election day, 15 September, Klassekampen's front page had a picture of Kristin Halvorsen of SV, and Folkvord lost his seat with a margin of 600 votes. The next day AKP formally declared non-confidence to Bjerke. Most of the editorial staff gathered around their editor, started a byline strike and published comments confronting the papers main owner.

==== Michelet takes over ====
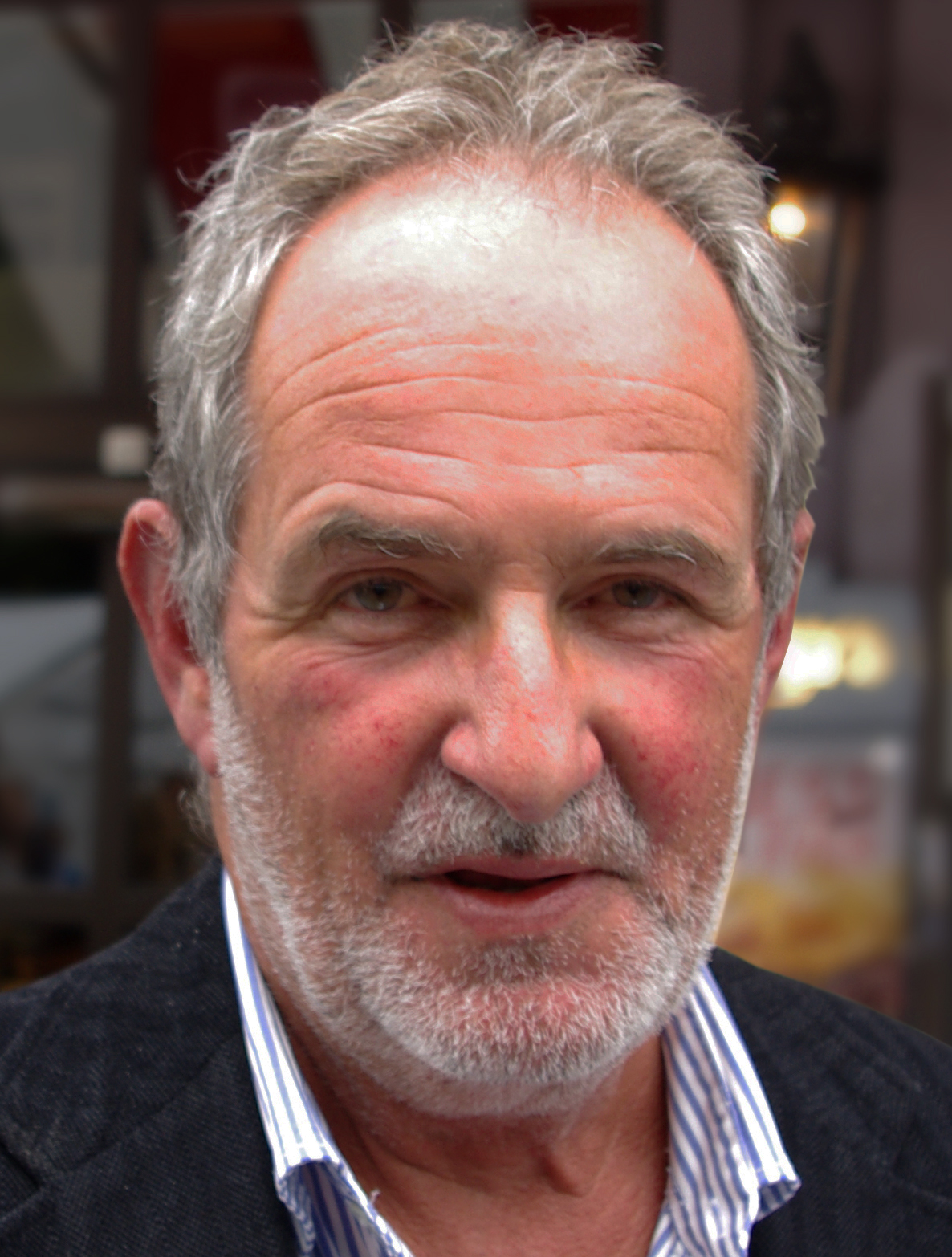
Jon Michelet

AKP now offered the position as editor to Jon Michelet, novelist, RV politician and former journalist. He was asked not to take the job by a large majority of the staff. Furthermore, campaigns were organized to hit the paper's economy by not renewing subscriptions or withholding promised financial contributions. When Bjerke received a formal letter about the boards decision of firing him, the local union of journalists declared that it collectively took over the leadership. As a compromise the board now decided to open for alternative candidates. Meanwhile, journalist Carsten Thomassen was appointed temporary editor. By the end of the month, four additional candidates had signed up, with Kjell Gjerseth being the favorite of the staff. He and MIchelet got the same number of votes in the board, leaving the decision to the board leader who voted in favor of Michelet. The public debate during and after this was hard. Both sides had its supporters. Bjerke went to court to keep the job, but settled with one year paid leave before quitting, while the board admitted that their reasons were not necessarily objectively justified. With most of the editorial staff as well as several external contributors leaving, Michelet's most acute task was to fill the columns of the paper on a daily basis. This turned out to be easier than feared, and soon the offices were filled with a new generation of journalists.

Still, it was necessary to improve the paper's economy. In 1998, AKP launched a campaign to sell new shares. If successful, this would give Klassekampen 5.5 million NOK while simultaneously reducing the party's ownership to just below 50 percent. The result was 5.9 million. At the same time, circulation dropped dramatically, leading to several years with operating deficits.

=== From 2000: Daily of the left ===
In the AKP years, other parties of the left as well as the trade union leadership regularly were criticized, often in a secterical way. To survive economically and fulfill the strategy of 1991, Klassekampen and its staff – in line with the slogan "The daily of the left" – had to make friends with these groups. Furthermore, the paper realized that it was not possible to grow by committing only to a working class group of readers, whereupon the coverage of cultural and ideological topics was increased. Much was done in these areas during the 1990s – and much was lost again during the 1997 crisis. Thus, a primary task for Michelet and his staff was to rebuild confidence within these groups. Several persons with links to the Socialist Left Party (and its youth organization Socialist Youth) was hired or offered columns in the paper.

MIchelet had a personal style that helped reducing old conflict and build confidence. On the other hand, his impulsivity could create internal problems, causing the board and the CFO to alarm AKP, still the largest owner. Strengthening of the paper's editorial leadership was necessary. In October 2000, Bjørgulv Braanen was hired as assistant editor (redaksjonssjef). Braanen had been in Klassekampen before, as head of layout in the late 1980s, but had spent ten years in different positions in Dagens Næringsliv, a liberal business paper. The return to Klassekampen for him meant a 50 percent reduction in salary, but he said it was a project he could stand for – on the condition that AKP would reduce its ownership and that the paper would develop further into an arena for the broad left.

In 2002, Klassekampen published around 10 essays by and two interviews with Israel Shamir, who was criticized for arguing in favour of alliances with the far right. After a debate between Shamir and Håkon Kolmannskog (then editor of the correspondence pages), the cooperation was ended.

==== Braanen's years ====
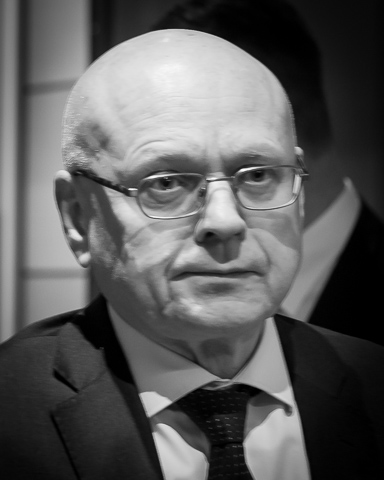
Bjørgulv Braanen

Michelet had a five-year contract as editor. For health reasons he abstained from prolongation, whereupon Braanen took over as chief editor in 2002. He presented his ambitions: "I think we have a golden opportunity to build a broad, versatile and radical paper. The political situation also demands such a paper, and not the propaganda paper of former times. The left is on the defensive, and the way ahead is vague. (...) In this situation we need a broad and inclusive radical and critical paper, not one that pretends to have all the answers up front."

Braanen followed this line, and Klassekampen managed to increase its circulation year by year. This naturally helped the paper's financial situation and made improvements possible. One of these was an increased coverage of culture. In September 2006 Bokmagasinet (The Book Magazine) was launched as an enclosure every Saturday, inspired by Guardian Review and the Danish Weekendavisen, and aiming to become "Norway's most important literature paper". In 2012 a similar music was approached in the same way when the weekly Musikkmagasinet started on Mondays. Theatre and the arts also have regular pages. For some time, the separate magazine Cinema was distributed along with Klassekampen six times per year.

In 2004, former editor Paul Bjerke returned to the paper with a regular weekly column that ran for thirteen years.

Another step against the mainstream media flow was to improve the paper's coverage of "all Norway" through regional offices – in Trondheim (2012), Tromsø (2017) and Bergen (2017).

In 2006 Braanen received the Fritt Ord Award for his efforts – together with the staff – to develop Klassekampen into a broad and including daily "with exceptional contributions in the field of serious political journalism". In 2009 he was named Editor of the Year by the Editors' Association of Oslo.

AKP's majority ownership was still a topic of discussion. In 2006 two left-wing publishing houses, Oktober and Pax, proposed to invest NOK 3 million in the paper. This was turned down by AKP, creating fear that the party was going back on its plan to reduce its share. But it turned out that the party's plan was even more ambitious, and in 2007 it was announced that also Fagforbundet, Norway's largest trade union, would throw in 3 million. A spokeswoman for the union stated that "Klassekampen plays an important role in areas important for the union: defending the welfare state, a critical attitude to neoliberalism and wide coverage of the environmental crisis". Later on more trade unions have bought shares in Klassekampen. Fellesforbundet first acquired shares for NOK 100,000 in 2011 (as did Landsorganisasjonen), and then in 2015 threw in 5 million NOK to become a 5 percent owner. In 2007, AKP and RV merged into the Red Party, which took over AKP shares.

==== Skurdal takes over ====
In 2018, Braanen resigned as chief editor and was replaced by Mari Skurdal who had along career in different leading positions in the paper. Braanen continued as a political commentator/editor. Skurdal has in general continued Braanen's editorial line, but with increased priority on investigative journalism. A separate unit for this was established in late 2021. A new digital platform was launched in 2018 and received the DOGA-label for good design the following year. However, Klassekampen remains to be a primarily printed newspaper with only a few daily articles openly accessible on the Internet.

In 2022 Skurdal was named Editor of the year by the Editors' Association of Oslo.

===== Coverage of Russia =====
In early 2022 Klassekampen was criticized by some of Norway's mainstream newspapers for an uncritical attitude towards Vladimir Putin's Russia and for having published pro-Russian conspiracy theories. The political editor of Dagbladet Geir Ramnefjell wrote that Klassekampen got its coverage of the events of the Russo-Ukrainian War that led to the 2022 full-scale invasion "most consistently wrong" and claimed – based on the publication of an essay by the Italian journalist Thomas Fazi – that the paper continued to publish "third rate conspiracy theories" of the "crackpot left" even after the invasion. The day after the Russian invasion the paper was described as "Putin's Norwegian parrots" by Andreas Slettholm of Aftenposten. The political editor of Dagens Næringsliv Frithjof Jacobsen wrote that Klassekampen's former editor Bjørgulv Braanen was among those who had espoused "rigid anti-Americanism" and "whose voices we do not need to listen to any more." Klassekampen, however, condemned the Russian invasion of Ukraine from the beginning. An editorial from Norway's largest newspaper Aftenposten in November 2022 stated that "before the invasion, Klassekampen went to great lengths to dismiss concerns that there was any threat from Russia against Ukraine. Now the newspaper chooses to downplay the danger that Russian manipulation of Western democracies poses."

=== Internet ===
Klassekampen has had a relatively small Internet presence since the 1990s, launched in late 1996. In 2020 the paper launched its new website and since then the newspaper has been climbing on daily digital readers. Katrine Holmøy has been Klassekampens development editor from 2016. In 2019, Klassekampens online paper was awarded with the DOGA-label for good design.

KK-forum was established by Trond Andresen in 1996. Andresen has since been a keen advocate of the newspaper's use of the Internet, both as moderator of its various semi-official or official early Internet platforms, as a columnist in the printed newspaper and at the shareholders' meetings. KK-forum played a major role in the ousting of then-editor Paul Bjerke in 1997, when the paper's owners, AKP, appointed Jon Michelet as the new editor. As editor of Klassekampen Michelet initiated a formal cooperation with Trond Andresen and KK-forum, that became the semi-official Internet forum of Klassekampen from 1997; it was linked from the newspaper's Internet frontpage. Andresen was also a regular columnist in the printed newspaper from 2000 to 2016.

In 2008 Klassekampen launched its official online forum, also moderated by Trond Andresen, following a decision at the shareholders' meeting spearheaded by Andresen.

In 2009 Trond Andresen established the Facebook group "Vi som bryr oss om avisa Klassekampen" [Those of us who care about the newspaper Klassekampen], where the paper's editorial practices are discussed. After some years Klassekampen distanced itself from the group, and in an editorial the newspaper claimed that the forum "has for years been the scene of backbiting of the newspaper's journalism and staff."

== Controversies ==
=== Coverage of gender and sexuality debates ===
In the 1970s, when the paper was strongly influenced by the Marxist–Leninist party AKP-ml, it reflected elements of the party's position on homosexuality. A draft party statement, "Framlegg til fråsegn om homofili" (1975), described homosexuality as primarily a "sexual deviation" rooted in social conditions and stated that it was not the task of communists to promote it as "desirable." During this period, Klassekampen refused to print a housing advertisement from "two lesbian workers." The editor justified the refusal by stating that, as Marxist–Leninists, Klassekampen did not regard homosexuality as a desirable condition.

In the 2020s the paper has been criticized by representatives of the LGBT community for its coverage of transgender people. Gender studies scholar Janne Bromseth wrote that "Klassekampen has published regular columnists who have voiced transphobic views for a long time." Skurdal denied the accusations of transphobia and said that the editorial profile is to bring in different voices on this and other issues, giving the readers the opportunity to make up their own minds. Regular columnists Anne Kalvig (vice chair of Women's Declaration International) and Kajsa Ekis Ekman (a Swedish freelance writer) have written several articles in the newspaper from "gender critical" viewpoints, including the article "Trump for reality" that defended the persecution of transgender people under the second Trump administration and especially his Executive Order 14168 titled as "Defending Women from Gender Ideology Extremism and Restoring Biological Truth to the Federal Government" as "important" and being based on "reality".

=== Antisemitism ===
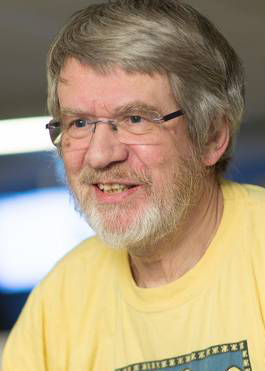
Trond Andresen was involved with Klassekampen for decades, including as an invited regular columnist for 16 years and editor of its debate forum

In his book Ingen er uskyldig: Antisemittisme på venstresiden, historian Torkel Brekke traces the history of left-wing antisemitism in Norway and extensively discusses how Klassekampen has at various times in its history promoted antisemitic narratives. Brekke argues that Klassekampen in the 1970s promoted a form of Holocaust revisionism that constituted "trivialization and relativization of the Holocaust which is close to what we find on the extreme right," including a series of articles in which the newspaper claimed that the Zionists were complicit in the genocide against the Jews in Europe. Brekke shows how Trond Andresen continued to be associated with Klassekampen as an invited regular columnist for 16 years until 2016, despite extensive criticism of his openly antisemitic views, resulting in him leaving the Red Party in 2009 when he faced calls for his expulsion from the party. Andresen has since openly embraced the far-right National Rally party in France and met with neo-Nazi activist Hans Jørgen Lysglimt Johansen, stating that they broadly agree on what he called the most important questions, including the claim that The Holocaust has been exaggerated.

== Current content ==
The paper is based in Oslo and has local offices in Bergen, Trondheim, Tromsø and Cairo, Egypt. Ownership is shared by the Red Party (successor of the Workers' Communist Party), the national trade unions Fagforbundet, Fellesforbundet and Industri Energi, Mater (sole owner of the Pax publisher), Oktoberstiftelsen (minority owner of the Oktober publishing house), the support organization Klassekampens venner, as well as smaller shareholders.

On Saturdays, the newspaper features a separate book magazine. Editors of this section have been Bendik Wold (2006–2008) and Karin Haugen (2008–present). Among the regular contributors are (per 2022): Jonas Bals, Ellen Engelstad, Tore Linné Eriksen, Elin Kittelsen, Mimir Kristjansson, Sandra Lillebø, Espen Stueland and Janneken Øverland. A special column on Nordic literature features essays by Gerður Kristný (Iceland), Peter Fröberg Idling and Magnus Nilsson (Sweden), Kristina Stoltz and Peter Nielsen (Denmark), and Sirpa Kähkönen and Pia Ingström (Finland).

A music magazine is included on Mondays. Editor is Erik Blegeberg. It features interviews, essays and reviews of a broad spectrum of music genres. Contributors include Egil Baumann, Mariann Bjørnelv, Charlotte Myrbråten and Tom Skjeklesæter.

In general, the paper presents a variety of opinions. It features several columns with regular external contributors (per 2022): "Feminist of course" (Wencke Mühleisen, Asta Beate Håland, Stephen Walton, Anne Bitsch), "Kringla heimsins" (Hans Jacob Orning, Gro Steinsland, Frans-Arne Stylegar, Christine Amadou, Thomas Reinertsen Berg, Gunnhild Røthe), "Homo Politicus" (Ottar Brox, Arne Johan Vetlesen, Bente Aasjord, Linn Herning, Magnus Marsdal), "A Nordic Dawn" (trade union activists from the Nordic countries), "Horizon" (Bhaskar Sunkara, Kajsa Ekis Ekman, Thomas Fazi, Francesca Borri, William Shoki, Grace Blakely, Vijay Prashad), "Heads and Tails" (Morten Jerven, Erik S. Reinert, Maria Walberg, Rune Skarstein, Chr. Anton Smedshaug, Ole Kvadsheim), "In good faith" (Lars Gule, Rania Jalal Al-Nahi, Gyrid Gunnes, Eivor Andersen Oftestad, Mina Bai), "Naturally" (Stefan Sundström, Anna Blix, Kathrine Kinn, Frans-Jan Parmentier, Lene Liebe Delsett), "Signed" (Jonas Bals, Sandra Lillebø, Olav Elgvin, Olaug Nilssen, Minda Holm, Åsa Linderborg).

Other regular contributors are Solveig Aareskjold, Idar Helle, Dag Seierstad, Morten Harper, Arild Linneberg, Torgrim Eggen, Arild Rønsen, and Sylfest Lomheim. Bjørn Vassnes has a weekly column on advances in science. Comedian Knut Nærum contributes as a cartoonist on Saturdays. Jens Styve's one-liner Dunce runs daily. Reviews of theater, film and art exhibition are regular.

The Norwegian edition of the monthly Le Monde diplomatique is enclosed in a full subscription of Klassekampen.

== Funding ==
Norway has for a long time had various schemes for state support of newspapers. Still, it has proved difficult to establish new nationwide print papers. When Klassekampen became a daily in 1977, it was the first time since 1945 a new paper entered this arena. The next time was in 1992.

In addition to state support and income from subscriptions, single sales and advertisements, Klassekampen has always been based on voluntary financial and practical support. The first printing press was financed by enthusiastic young people taking summer jobs or newspaper couriers (for established newspapers) before school hours. All work (editing, printing, sales) was done on a voluntary basis in the first years. The first paid employees started when the paper turned into a weekly publication in 1973. In 1974 the party launched a campaign to finance a rotary press. The following 2.5 years the campaign raised more than NOK 5.6 million.

Klassekampen's current owners include Norway's Red Party, the association Klassekampens venner ("Friends of Klassekampen"), several trade unions and smaller shareholders.

== Chief editors ==
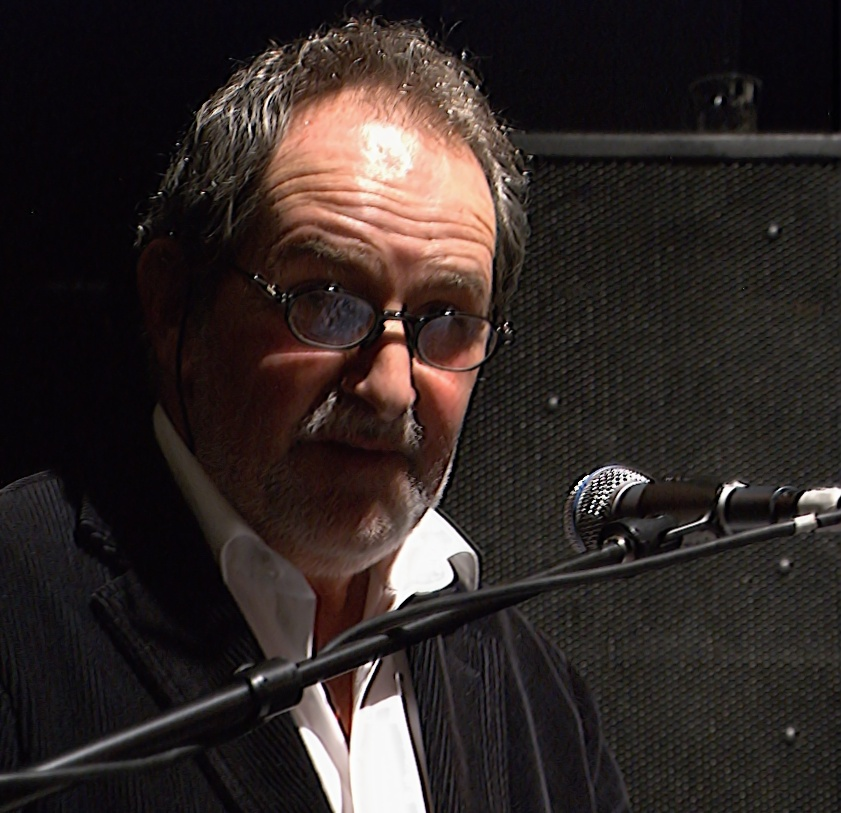
Jon Michelet, chief editor 1997–2002

- Anders M. Andersen 1969
- Anders M. Andersen and Finn Aasheim 1969
- Finn Aasheim 1969
- Sigurd Allern and Finn Aasheim 1969–1970
- Sigurd Allern 1970–1972
- Finn Sjue 1973–1977
- Egil Fossum 1977–1978
- Egil Fossum and Sigurd Allern 1978–1979
- Sigurd Allern 1979–1995
- Paul Bjerke 1995–1997
- Jon Michelet 1997–2002
- Bjørgulv Braanen 2002–2018
- Mari Skurdal 2018–

== Circulation ==
Circulation 1980–2025
- 1980: 7219
- 1981: 7633
- 1982: 7920
- 1983: 7920
- 1984: 8008
- 1985: 7780
- 1986: 8020
- 1987: 8110
- 1988: 8185
- 1989: 8449
- 1990: 8206
- 1991: 9232
- 1992: 10042
- 1993: 9692
- 1994: 9822
- 1995: 9103
- 1996: 7796
- 1997: 8087
- 1998: 6506
- 1999: 6477
- 2000: 6557
- 2001: 6648
- 2002: 6929
- 2003: 7178
- 2004: 7512
- 2005: 8759
- 2006: 10109
- 2007: 11386
- 2008: 12109
- 2009: 13265
- 2010: 14390
- 2011: 15390
- 2012: 16353
- 2013: 17648
- 2014: 19253
- 2015: 21648
- 2016: 23414
- 2017: 25019
- 2018: 27855
- 2019: 30434
- 2020: 32375
- 2021: 34036
- 2022: 33265
- 2023: 34008
- 2024: 34911
- 2025: 36813

== See also ==
- List of Norwegian newspapers
