= 1993 Norwegian parliamentary election =

- 12–13 September 1993

All 165 seats in the Storting 83 seats needed for a majority
- Registered: 3,259,957
- Turnout: 75.85% (▼7.31 pp)
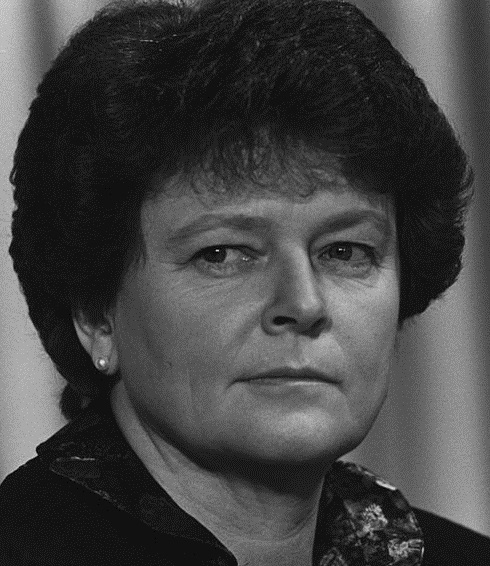

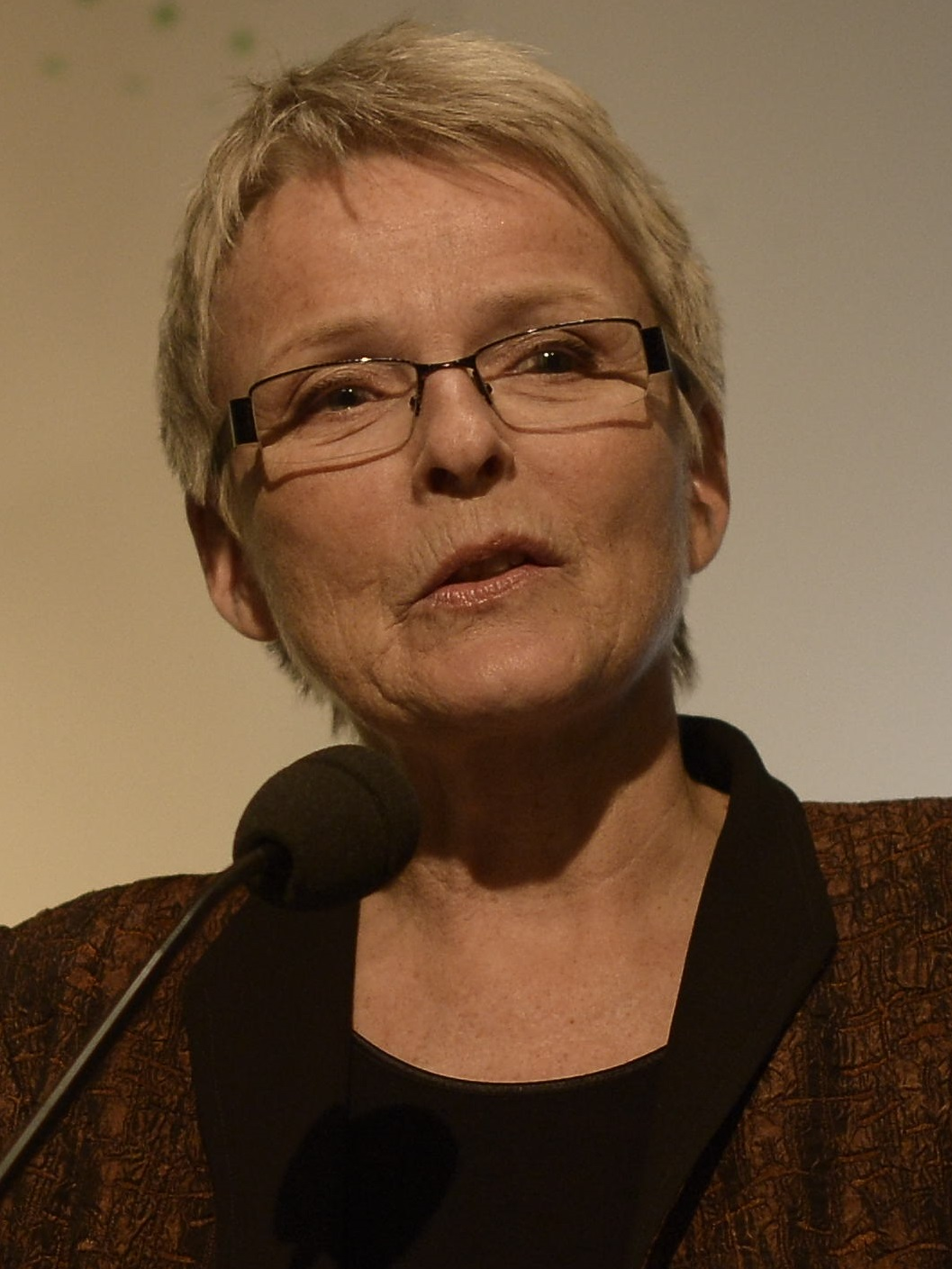

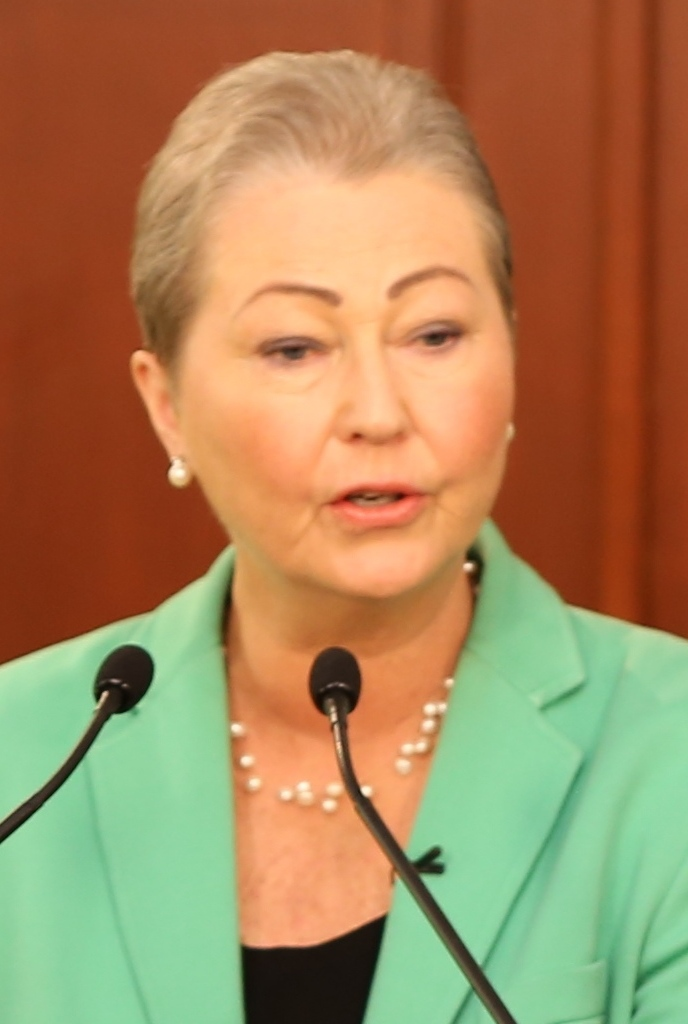

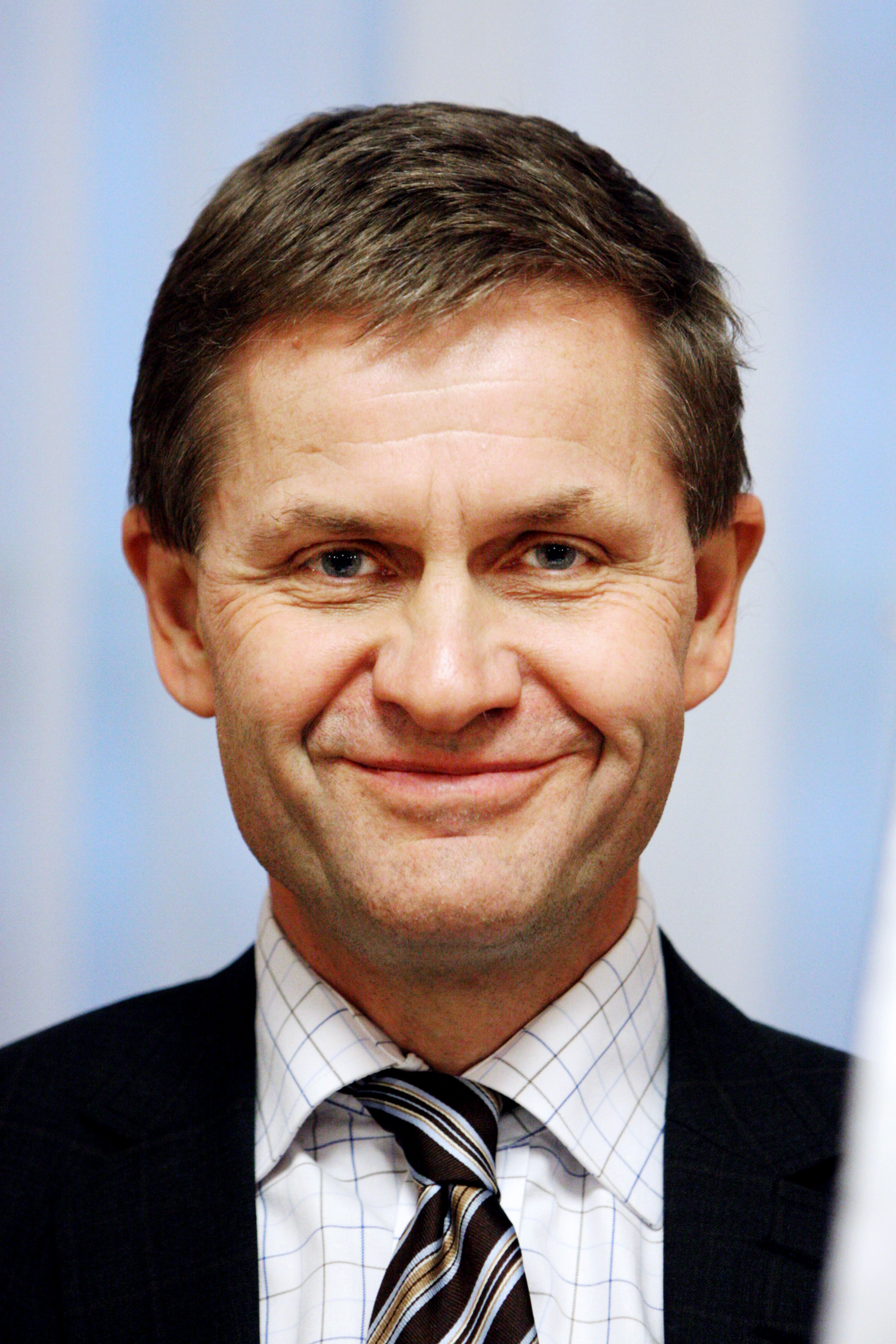

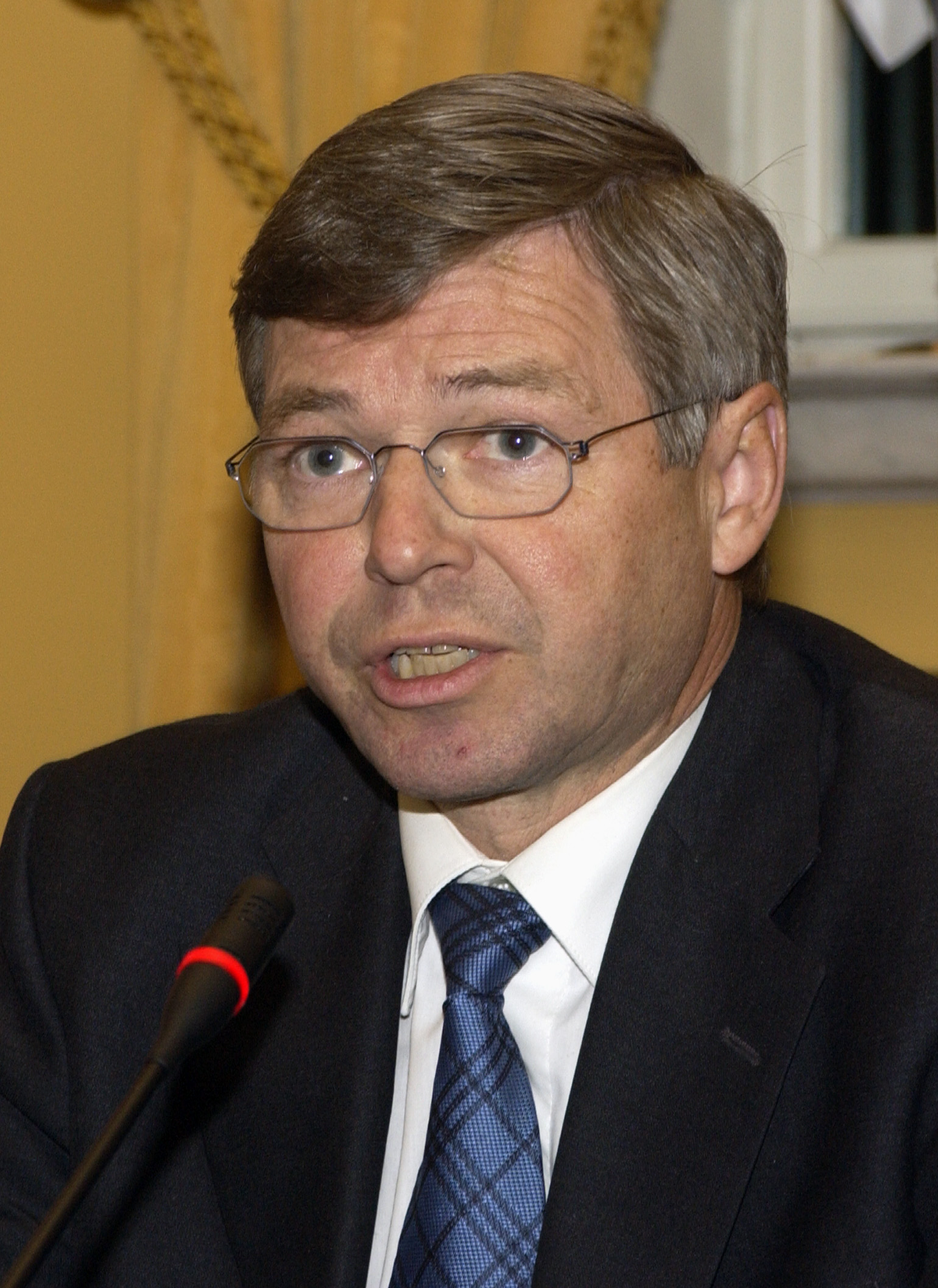

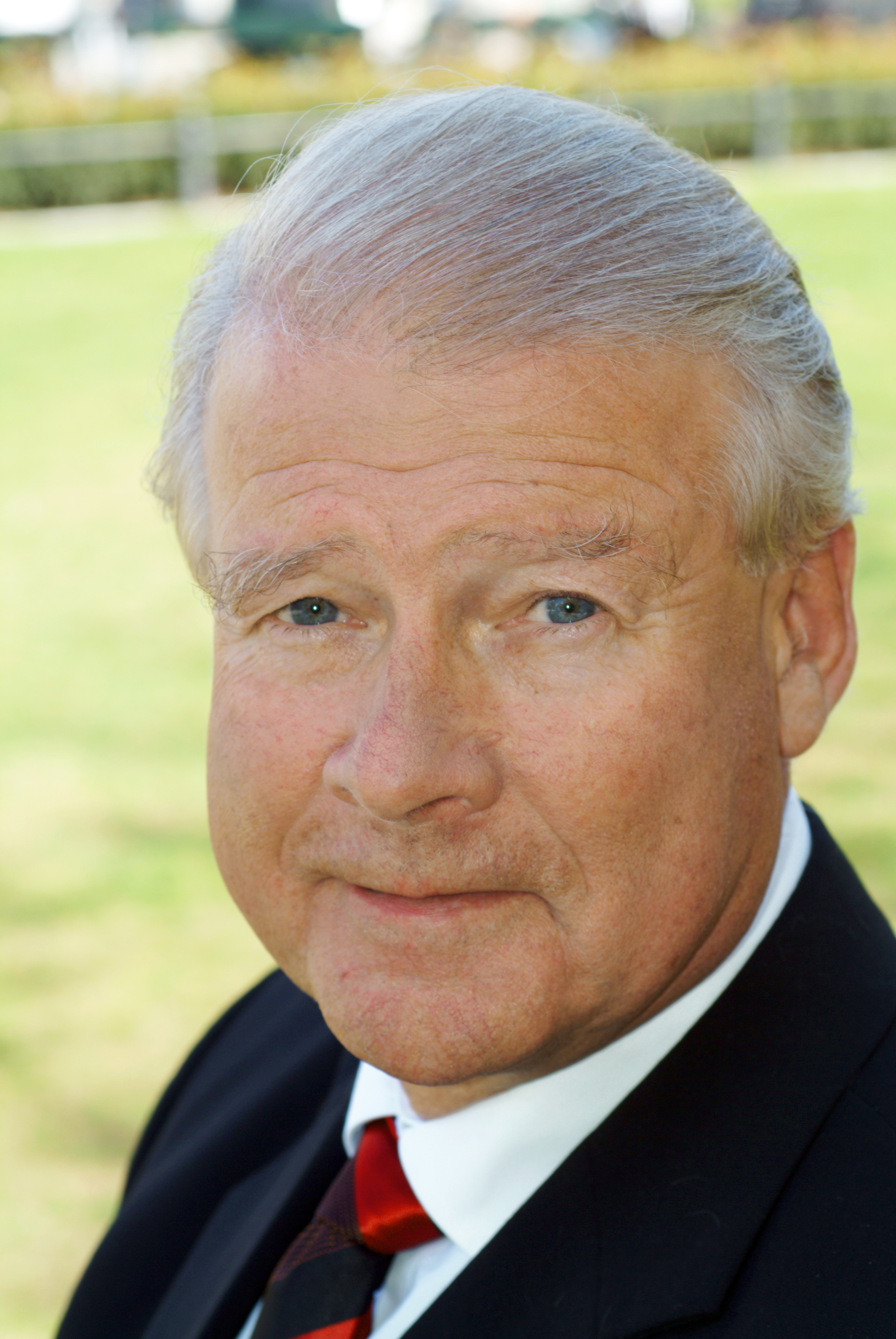

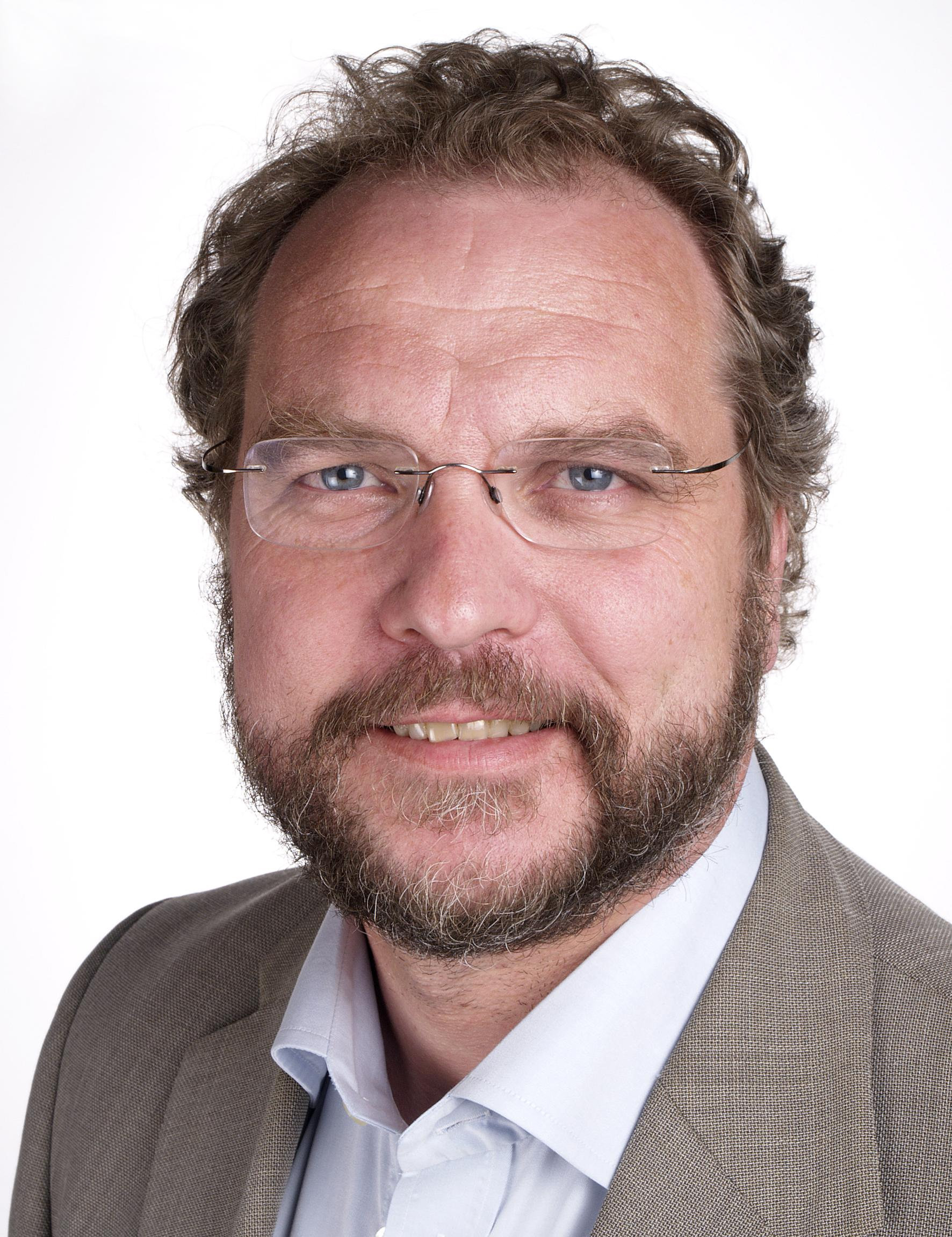

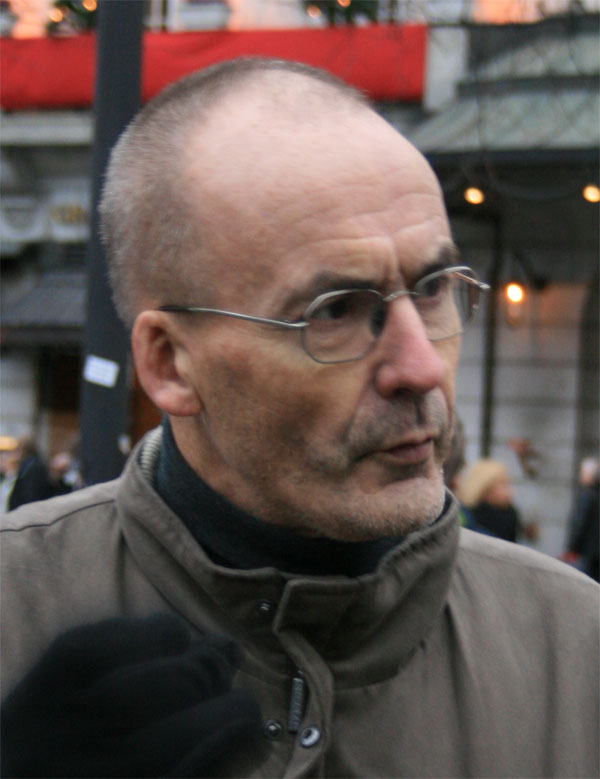
	First party	Second party	Third party
Leader	Gro Harlem Brundtland	Anne Enger Lahnstein	Kaci Kullmann Five
Party	Labour	Centre	Conservative
Last election	34.27%, 63 seats	6.47%, 11 seats	22.23%, 37 seats
Seats won	67	32	28
Seat change	▲4	▲21	▼9
Popular vote	908,724	412,187	419,373
Percentage	36.91%	16.74%	17.03%
Swing	▲2.64 pp	▲10.27 pp	▼5.19 pp
	Fourth party	Fifth party	Sixth party
Leader	Erik Solheim	Kjell Magne Bondevik	Carl I. Hagen
Party	Socialist Left	Christian; Democratic	Progress
Last election	10.08%, 17 seats	8.49%, 14 seats	13.04%, 22 seats
Seats won	13	13	10
Seat change	▼4	▼1	▼12
Popular vote	194,633	193,885	154,497
Percentage	7.91%	7.88%	6.28%
Swing	▼2.17 pp	▼0.61 pp	▼6.76 pp
	Seventh party	Eighth party
Leader	Lars Sponheim (Note: Not Party Leader but Top Candidate in Hordaland (won))	Erling Folkvord (Note: Not Party Leader but Top Candidate in Oslo (won))
Party	Liberal	Red
Last election	3.20%, 0 seats	0.84%, 0 seats (Note: As part of County Lists for Environment and Solidarity)
Seats won	1	1
Seat change	▲1	▲1
Popular vote	88,985	26,360
Percentage	3.61%	1.07%
Swing	▲0.41 pp	▲0.23 pp
- Largest bloc and seats won by constituency
Prime Minister before election
Gro Harlem Brundtland
Labour
Prime Minister after election
Gro Harlem Brundtland
Labour

Parliamentary elections were held in Norway on 12 and 13 September 1993. It was the first European election where the two largest parties fielded a female leadership candidate, and the first election in history where all the largest three parties fielded female leadership candidates. The Labour Party remained the largest party in the Storting, winning 67 of the 165 seats.

Voter turnout was 76%, the lowest in a national election since the 1927 elections. The prospect of European Union membership was a key issue in the election campaign.

== Contesting parties ==
Name		Ideology	Position	Leader	1989 result	
Name		Ideology	Position	Leader	Votes (%)	Seats
Ap	Labour Party; Arbeiderpartiet	Social democracy Pro-Europeanism	Centre-left	Gro Harlem Brundtland	34.2%	63 / 165
H	Conservative Party; Høyre	Conservatism; Pro-Europeanism	Centre-right	Kaci Kullmann Five	22.2%	37 / 165
FrP	Progress Party; Fremskrittspartiet	Classical liberalism Pro-Europeanism	Right-wing	Carl I. Hagen	13.0%	22 / 165
SV	Socialist Left Party; Sosialistisk Venstreparti	Democratic socialism Hard-Euroscepticism	Left-wing	Erik Solheim	10.0%	17 / 165
KrF	Christian Democratic Party; Kristelig Folkeparti	Christian democracy Euroscepticism	Centre to centre-right	Kjell Magne Bondevik	8.4%	14 / 165
Sp	Centre Party; Senterpartiet	Agrarianism; Hard-Euroscepticism	Centre	Anne Enger Lahnstein	6.4%	11 / 165
V	Liberal Party; Venstre	Social liberalism Euroscepticism	Centre	Odd Einar Dørum	3.2%	0 / 165
F	Future for Finnmark; Folkeaksjonen Framtid for Finnmark	Social democracy		Anders John Aune	0.3%	1 / 165

== Campaign ==
=== Slogans ===
Party	Original slogan	English translation
Labour Party	«Partiet til venstre der hjerte banker»	«The party to the left where the heart beats»
Conservative Party	«Vi vil føre en solidarisk politikk for å skape arbeidsplasser, et miljø og leve i og rettferdig fordeling»	«We will drive a solidaric policy to create jobs, an environment to live in and fair distribution»
Progress Party	«Fremtiden skapes, den vedtas ikke»	«The future is created, it’s not passed (as in a law passed)»
Socialist Left Party	«Verdiskaping, valgfrihet og internasjonalt samarbeid»	«Creation of values, freedom of choice and international cooperation»
Christian Democratic Party	«Gjenreis respekten for livets ukrenkelighet i alle livets faser»	« restore respect for the inviolability of life in all phases of life»
Centre Party	«Nei til EF, forsvar grunnloven»	«No to EC (European Community, later European Union), defend the constitution»
Liberal party	«Tillit til dem som skaper jobbene»	«Trust to those who create the jobs»

=== Debates ===
1993 Norwegian general election debates
Date	Time	Organizers	P Present I Invitee N Non-invitee								
Date	Time	Organizers	Ap	H	Frp	Sv	KrF	Sp	V	R	Refs
10 Sep	00:00	NRK	P Thorbjørn Jagland, Gro Harlem Brundtland	P Kaci Kullmann Five	P Carl I. Hagen	P Erik Solheim	P Kjell Magne Bondevik	P Anne Enger Lahnstein	P Odd Einar Dørum	P Aksel Nærstad	

== Results ==
Party	Votes	%	Seats	+/–
Labour Party	908,724	36.91	67	+4
Conservative Party	419,373	17.03	28	–9
Centre Party	412,187	16.74	32	+21
Socialist Left Party	194,633	7.91	13	–4
Christian Democratic Party	193,885	7.88	13	–1
Progress Party	154,497	6.28	10	–12
Liberal Party	88,985	3.61	1	+1
Red Electoral Alliance	26,360	1.07	1	+1
Pensioners' Party	25,835	1.05	0	0
Fatherland Party	11,694	0.47	0	New
New Future Coalition Party	8,777	0.36	0	New
Environment Party The Greens	3,054	0.12	0	0
Christian Conservative Party	1,974	0.08	0	New
Stop the Immigration	1,952	0.08	0	New
Natural Law Party	1,853	0.08	0	New
Freedom Party against the EF Union	774	0.03	0	New
Liberal People's Party	725	0.03	0	New
Common Future	548	0.02	0	New
Communist Party	361	0.01	0	0
Society Party	95	0.00	0	New
Common List against Foreign Immigration	5,663	0.23	0	New
Christian Unity Party	5,663	0.23	0	New
Political Alternative Hordaland	5,663	0.23	0	New
Pensioners' Party–Common Future	5,663	0.23	0	–
Total	2,461,949	100.00	165	0
Valid votes	2,461,949	99.57		
Invalid/blank votes	10,602	0.43		
Total votes	2,472,551	100.00		
Registered voters/turnout	3,259,957	75.85		
Source: Nohlen & Stöver, European Elections Database

=== Voter demographics ===
Cohort	Percentage of cohort voting for							
Cohort	Ap	H	Sp	Sv	KrF	FrP	V	Others
Total vote	36.91%	17.03%	16.74%	7.91%	7.88%	6.28%	3.61%	
Gender
Females	37.3%	14.4%	17.1%	9.5%	9.3%	4.4%	4.3%	
Males	36.6%	19.4%	16.5%	6.5%	6.6%	7.9%	2.9%	
Age
18–30 years old	32.5%	15.8%	17.7%	11.9%	4.7%	9.2%	3.4%	
30-59 years old	38.1%	18.3%	16.1%	8.5%	6.4%	5.4%	4%	
60 years old and older	38.5%	15.3%	17.2%	2.4%	14.5%	5.5%	2.9%	
Work
Low income	35%	11.1%	21.6%	9.1%	9.7%	5.1%	2.7%	
Average income	45.1%	11.9%	16.9%	7.1%	8.8%	4.8%	2.9%	
High income	33.8%	27.5%	11.3%	7.9%	5.5%	6.7%	4.8%	
Education
Primary school	47.8%	7.4%	20.8%	4.4%	7.4%	5.7%	2.5%	
High school	36.6%	14.9%	19.1%	8.5%	7.3%	7.4%	3%	
University/college	29.6%	28.1%	9.4%	9.7%	9.2%	4.7%	5.5%	
Source: Norwegian Institute for Social Research

=== Seat distribution ===
Constituency	Total seats	Seats won							
Constituency	Total seats	Ap	Sp	H	SV	KrF	Frp	V	RV
Akershus	14	5	1	4	1	1	2		
Aust-Agder	4	2	1	1					
Buskerud	8	4	1	2			1		
Finnmark	4	2	1		1				
Hedmark	8	4	2	1	1				
Hordaland	15	5	3	2	1	2	1	1	
Møre og Romsdal	10	4	3	1		2			
Nord-Trøndelag	6	3	2		1				
Nordland	12	5	3	1	2	1			
Oppland	7	4	2	1					
Oslo	17	6	1	5	2		2		1
Østfold	8	4	1	1		1	1		
Rogaland	11	3	2	2	1	2	1		
Sogn og Fjordane	5	2	2			1			
Sør-Trøndelag	10	4	2	2	1	1			
Telemark	8	3	1	1	1	1	1		
Troms	6	2	2	1	1				
Vest-Agder	5	2	1	1		1			
Vestfold	7	3	1	2			1		
Total	165	67	32	28	13	13	10	1	1
Source: Norges Offisielle Statistikk
