= Bjerke (surname) =

Origin
- Origin: Old Norse
- Meaning: Birch
- Region of origin: Norway

Other names
- Variant forms: Bjerkes, Björk

Bjerke is a Norwegian surname, also found throughout Scandinavia. Notable people with the surname include:

- André Bjerke (1918–1985), Norwegian writer and poet
- Björn Bjerke, Swedish economist
- Desiree Bjerke, Norwegian skeleton racer
- Ejlert Bjerke (1887–1963), Norwegian writer
- Espen Harald Bjerke, Norwegian cross-country skier
- Ferdinand Bjerke, Norwegian railway engineer.
- Harald Bjerke (1860–1926), Norwegian businessperson
- Ingvald Bjerke (1907–1990), Norwegian boxer who competed in the 1928 Summer Olympics
- Juul Bjerke (1928–2014), Norwegian economist
- Kristin Blystad-Bjerke, Norwegian football player
- Olaf Bjerke (1893–1957), Norwegian trade unionist
- Paul Bjerke, Norwegian media scientist
- Per Arne Bjerke (1952–2015), Norwegian journalist and politician
- Regine Bjerke, Norwegian judge
- Rune Bjerke, Norwegian businessperson and politician for the Labour Party
- Siri Bjerke, Norwegian Government minister of in the Labour Party
- Svein Bjerke, Norwegian professor emeritus at the University of Oslo
- Trine Bjerke Rønning, Norwegian football player
