= Antiglobalism =

Antiglobalism or anti-globalism is covered by two articles:

- Left-wing antiglobalism, a political position opposing globalization from a socialist or anti-capitalist perspective.
- Right-wing antiglobalism, a political position opposing globalization based on national identity and sovereignty.

Anti-globalization is an important, related topic.

- Anti-globalization movement, a social movement critical of the economic globalization.
- Criticisms of globalization, the various arguments and critiques regarding the process of globalization.

== See also ==
- Globalism#Usage in national politics
- Opposition to immigration
- Protectionism
