= Bjerke =

Bjerke may refer to:

== As a surname ==
- Bjerke (surname), a Norwegian surname

== Places ==
- Bjerke (borough), a borough of the city Oslo, Norway
- Bjerke Upper Secondary School
- Mount Bjerke, a mountain in Antarctica

== Other ==
- Bjerke IL, a Norwegian sport club based in Akershus
- Bjerke Travbane, a racing track
