= Pål Steigan =

Norwegian writer and politician

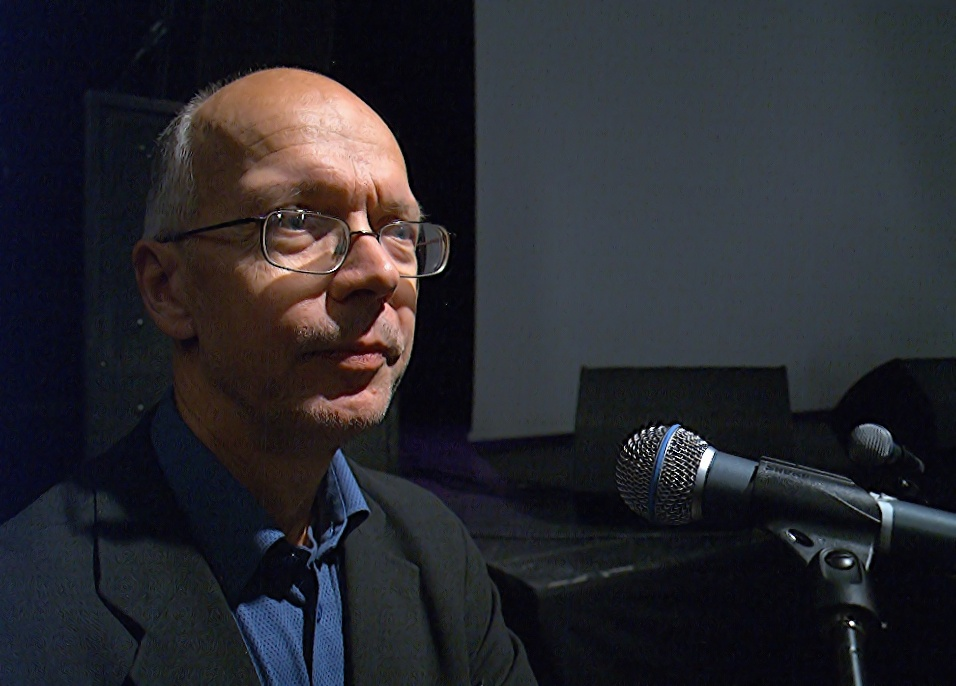
- Steigan in 2007

Leader of the Workers' Communist Party
- In office 1975–1984
- Preceded by: Sigurd Allern
- Succeeded by: Kjersti Ericsson

Leader of the Red Electoral Alliance
- In office 1975–1979
- Preceded by: Sigurd Allern
- Succeeded by: Hilde Haugsgjerd

Personal details
- Born: 31 May 1949 (age 76) Oslo, Norway
- Other political affiliations: Workers' Communist Party; Red Electoral Alliance

Pål Steigan (born 31 May 1949) is a Norwegian writer and politician, best known as founder of the newspaper Klassekampen and the website Steigan.no. He was leader of the Maoist Workers' Communist Party, AKP (m-l) from 1975 to 1984, and co-leader of the Red Electoral Alliance (RV) until 1979. Both parties were small fringe parties that were never represented in parliament during his tenure. He co-founded Klassekampen as a monthly periodical in 1969, and during his leadership AKP developed the periodical into a newspaper in 1977. He later founded the alternative news website Steigan.no that is described by mainstream Norwegian media as a platform of Russian propaganda, conspiracy theories, racism and transphobia.

== Workers Communist Party, AKP (m-l) ==
He co-founded Klassekampen as a monthly periodical in 1969, and during his leadership AKP (m-l) developed the periodical into a newspaper in 1977.

During his leadership of AKP (m-l), Steigan traveled to countries under communist regimes, such as China, Czechoslovakia, Albania and Cambodia (Democratic Kampuchea). He met Mao Zedong, Enver Hoxha and Pol Pot.

After meeting the Khmer Rouge leader Pol Pot in 1978, he began to support the regime, later admitting his support for the genocidal Khmer Rouge was a mistake explaining that he now believed it was not Marxist. He has continued to be criticised for bearing a personal responsibility for his political support to the regime.

In 1978, he told an interviewer from The Call, the newspaper of the American Communist Party (Marxist–Leninist), that since the foundation of the party five years earlier "we have been waging a struggle against two brands of revisionism" in Norway, "the Brezhnevist, Moscow revisionist type party, which is the old so-called Norwegian Communist Party, and a newer Eurorevisionist party." According to Steigan in the same interview: "[I]t’s obvious that the Soviet social-imperialists are planning to take Norway in the initial stages of a war over Europe."

He is a critic of capitalism, writing that it "has inflicted so many defeats upon the working class and people all over the world that it’s hard to give an account of them."

== Steigan.no ==
Steigan founded the self-proclaimed "anti-globalist" alternative news site Steigan.no that has been widely criticized for promoting Russian propaganda, conspiracy theories, racism and transphobia. The website has been described by extremism researcher John Færseth as a platform of conspiracy theories and pro-Kremlin disinformation and propaganda, and as an example of "red–brown convergence" with links to the alt-right.

According to the fact checking website Faktisk.no, Steigan is part of an alternative and far-right echo chamber that also includes Document.no, Rights.no, Resett and Lykten.no, and where individuals linked to Stop Islamisation of Norway play a prominent role. In 2022 Faktisk.no wrote that Steigan is the main promoter of Russian propaganda among alternative media in Norway.

The secretary-general of the left-wing Red party Benedikte Pryneid Hansen said the leadership of the party shares the view that Steigan is a platform of "onesided Russian war propaganda, conspiracy theories, racism and transphobia", and that the blog is increasingly characterized by "extreme conspiracy theories." Anne-Marith Rasmussen, the president of Red in Troms and chair of the party’s LGBT committee, said Steigan is a "blog that promotes racism, homophobia and transphobia" as well as Russian propaganda, and that is a threat to democracy.

Steigan was denied membership in the Norwegian Association of Newspaper Editors (Norsk Redaktørforening), with the rationale that Steigan.no is not a journalistic medium, but rather an activist website that disregards accepted journalistic principles.

Some of the blog's writers include prominent Norwegian anti-semite and Hans Olav Brendberg.

== Books ==
Steigan's memoirs En folkefiende (A public enemy) were published in 2013.

Steigan, Pål, Veiskille: finnes det noen vei ut av miljøkrisa? Oktober Forlag, Oslo, 1990, 244 s.
