= Mari Skurdal =

Norwegian journalist (born 1977)

- Born: 6 September 1977 (age 48); Oslo, Norway
- Education: University of Oslo
- Occupations: Schoolteacher, textbook writer, journalist and newspaper editor
- Employer: Klassekampen

Mari Skurdal (born 6 September 1977) is a Norwegian journalist and newspaper editor. Since 2018 she has been chief editor of the daily print and online newspaper Klassekampen.

== Background ==
Skurdal was born in Oslo on 6 September 1977, and is educated from the University of Oslo. She is a co-author of several textbooks for secondary school, and worked as teacher in secondary school until she started working as journalist for the newspaper Klassekampen.

== Editor of Klassekampen ==
After ten years in different leading positions in Klassekampen (the last position being feature editor), Skurdal in 2018 was appointed chief editor of the paper.

She was honoured as Editor of the year 2022 by Oslo Redaktørforening (the Oslo Association of Editors).

In 2021 she was criticized for the paper's coverage of transgender people by journalism lecturer Jon Martin Larsen who wrote that he fears her articles contribute to "incitement and hatred against transgender people." In 2022 Larsen wrote that Klassekampen "tramples on" transgender people and that he cautions his students against the paper. Skurdal has denied the accusation that the paper is transphobic.

Media offices
Preceded by Bjørgulv Braanen	Editor of Klassekampen; 2018–present	Incumbent
