= Hans Erik Matre =

Norwegian newspaper editor

Hans Erik Matre (born 14 May 1955) is a Norwegian newspaper editor.

He was born in Ski. He was a subeditor in Vårt Land from 1980 to 1983, and chief editor from 1983 to 1989. He doubled as chief editor and chief executive of both the Norwegian News Agency from 1989 to 1994 and Bergens Tidende from 1994 to 1997, before being hired in Schibsted. From 1988 to 1997 he also chaired the Association of Norwegian Editors. In 2004 he became chief editor of Schibsted's flagship newspaper Aftenposten. He temporarily withdrew in 2008 since he underwent cancer treatment, and in 2009 he resigned on a permanent basis.

Media offices
Preceded by Thor Bjarne Bore	Chief editor of Vårt Land; 1983–1989 (jointly with Gisle Hollekim 1983–85, jointly with Helge Kjøllesdal 1985–89)	Succeeded by Åge Petter Christiansen
Preceded by Magne Gaasemyr	Chief editor of Bergens Tidende; 1994–1997	Succeeded by Einar Hålien
Preceded by Per Brunvand	Chair of the Association of Norwegian Editors; 1989–1997	Succeeded by Tor Axelsen
Preceded by Einar Hanseid	Chief editor of Aftenposten; 2004–2008	Succeeded by Hilde Haugsgjerd (acting)
