= Farmen (band) =

Farmen was a Norwegian pop rock band, active between 1995 and 2000.

== Inception and first single ==
The band was named after principal member Hasse Farmen, a former member of Mercury Motors and Couldn't Happen Here. Farmen penned all melodies and lyrics. Some songs had been written for his first band Couldn't Happen Here, whereas most were conceived in 1994. In addition, one song contained the lyrics of Inger Hagerup's "To tunger", and another was a translation of The Clique/REM's "Superman".

Hasse's brother Rolf Farmen played the drums, whereas the guitar and bass were played by Rune Jørgensen, formerly of Pompel & the Pilts, and Stein Torleif Bjella. Jørn Christensen came on board as producer.

Farmen issued the single "Suksess (enda bedre enn sex)" in May 1995. The band then drew comparisons with De Lillos, with Hasse Farmen surmising that the vocals were a bit similar. De Lillos vocalist Lars Lillo-Stenberg even appeared as a guest on the forthcoming album, as did Frank Hammersland.

Arild Rønsen of Puls stated that the single was well-produced and musically convincing, albeit not surprising and not provoking. Rønsen believed that the album could find mainstream success. "Katerine" followed as a radio single, which saw some airplay on NRK P3. Arild Rønsen called it "the best DumDum song not signed by Kjartan Kristiansen", highlighting similarities in songwriting.

== Album ==
Hjertet er en ensom sjåfør ("The Heart is a Lonely Driver") was released in March 1996. It was self-released on Rodeløkka Gramofon, but with distribution from Polygram. On the record, the band name was stylized faRmen.

For Arbeiderbladet, Eirik Valebrokk wrote that Hjertet was "nice, with great melodies". The songwriter and producer performed well, but this did not indicate that the album could not rise above obscurity. Mode Steinkjer reckoned the album was "embroidered with perfection", showcased good songwriting and with lyrics "consisting of several obvious 24-carat gold flakes". However, the dice throw was 4 out of 6. Natt og Dag's reviewer gave the same grade, stating that Farmen's movement into De Lillos' musical territory was audacious. The album deserved to sell more than it would probably do.

Another 4-out-of-6 review was syndicated by the Norwegian News Agency, whose reviewer stated that Farmen at times were highly charming. The good melodies also secured 4-out-of-6 reviews in Nordlandsposten and Romsdals Budstikke.

Vårt Land was somewhat more positive: "Guitar-based pop rock with personal touch, strong melodies that tiptoe into the ear – and stay there". One could "grow fond of" the record, which had sales potential. Moss Avis conveyed the same sentiment; Farmen should "become a force to be reckoned with" due to its "brilliant tunes" with "the best from Norwegian rock and pop mixed in". Farmen should "sell records like soft ice on a sunny, bright Sunday in July" if "there were a trace of justice in the record business". Glåmdalen also gave a 5 out of 6. Musician and author Levi Henriksen declared that Hjerter was the best album with Norwegian lyrics of 1996 thus far, with enough variation to distance Farmen from De Lillos and other musical relatives. In repeating his good criticism of the previous single, Arild Rønsen emphasized the same points. Hasse Farmen was a contender for the magazine's own Vocalist of the Year poll.

Less fortunate reviews came in Bergensavisen, calling the album "monotonous" and issuing a dice throw of 3. According to Fredriksstad Blad's reviewer, Hjertet was "unfortunately not very good", "rather mediocre". Another newspaper Sandefjords Blad wrote that the first three songs had potential, but the similarity to De Lillos became stronger throughout the record, becoming "almost comical". All in all, the album was "a somewhat messy quilt of good and bad melodies. Mostly bad, unfortunately".

According to Dagbladet, Hjertet er en ensom sjåfør had sold 1000 copies near the end of 1996.

== Later career ==
Farmen followed with the EP Pyroman in 2000. In reviewing the EP, Lofotposten called Farmen "a dead project" that "we can do well without".

Hasse Farmen later issued albums under his own name.
