= Lund Report =

1996 Norwegian report on illegal surveillance

The Lund Report (Official title: "Dokument nr. 15 (1995-96) - Rapport til Stortinget fra kommisjonen som ble nedsatt av Stortinget for å granske påstander om ulovlig overvåking av norske borgere", in English: "Document no. 15 (1995-96) - Report to the Storting from the commission which was appointed in order to investigate allegations of illegal surveillance of Norwegian citizens") was presented to the Norwegian Parliament on 28 March 1996. It was produced by the so-called Lund Commission, which had been appointed on 1 February 1994 and consisted of Supreme Court Justice Ketil Lund (chairman), lawyer Regine Ramm Bjerke, professor and former politician Berge Furre, Major General Torkel Hovland and Gender Equality Ombud Ingse Stabel. Reidar T. Larsen and Vegard Holm were also proposed as member of the commission, but a majority of the Norwegian Parliament rejected this.

The report reveals extensive surveillance of Norwegian communists, socialists and individuals and groups which the Norwegian Police Security Agency regarded to represent a threat to national security. It also criticizes several issues in relation to the secret services:

- The intimate collaboration between the security agency and the Norwegian Labour Party
- Registrations contrary to binding guidelines
- Registrations on the basis of old attitudes
- Unclear responsibilities

Even though an addendum to the report discusses the relationship between the work of the surveillance service and human rights, the framework as such is not a theme for the report.

The report shows that the illegal surveillance first and foremost has focused on the Communist Party, the Socialist People's Party, the Workers' Communist Party, and the Socialist Left Party, as well as organizations which were assumed to be in close contact with these parties, such as Nei til Atomvåpen (No to Nuclear Weapons), Sambandet Norge-Sovjetunionen (Norway-Soviet Union Association), the Norwegian Palestine Committee, the Women's Front of Norway and the Norwegian Solidarity Committee for Vietnam. Right-wing extremist groups are also mentioned in relation to the threat image, but nothing in the report indicates that illegal surveillance against these milieus took place.

An open hearing took place in the Storting following the report. Here former Prime Minister Kåre Willoch among others defended the surveillance of the Workers' Communist Party with the assertion that this was an illegal organization, a view which was denied by experts. The hearing and the conditions surrounding it led to the departure from the cabinet by among others minister for oil and energy, former minister of justice, Grete Faremo. No-one has been held legally responsible for the illegalities, however, the Storting voted to establish a law about right to look into the files. Even though the Innsynsutvalget, which is the authority which decides who shall be allowed to look into the material, proposed to make the law permanent, the time limit for applying for permissions to look into the files expired on 31 December 2002.

Individuals who have suffered serious damage because of registration in violation with official guidelines or surveillance, have been able to apply for damages up to 100,000 NOK.

Also in other countries the ways of the surveillance services have been subject of scrutiny, but outside of the former Soviet bloc few countries have taken this as far as Norway has.
