= Jørn Magdahl =

Norwegian politician (born 1950)

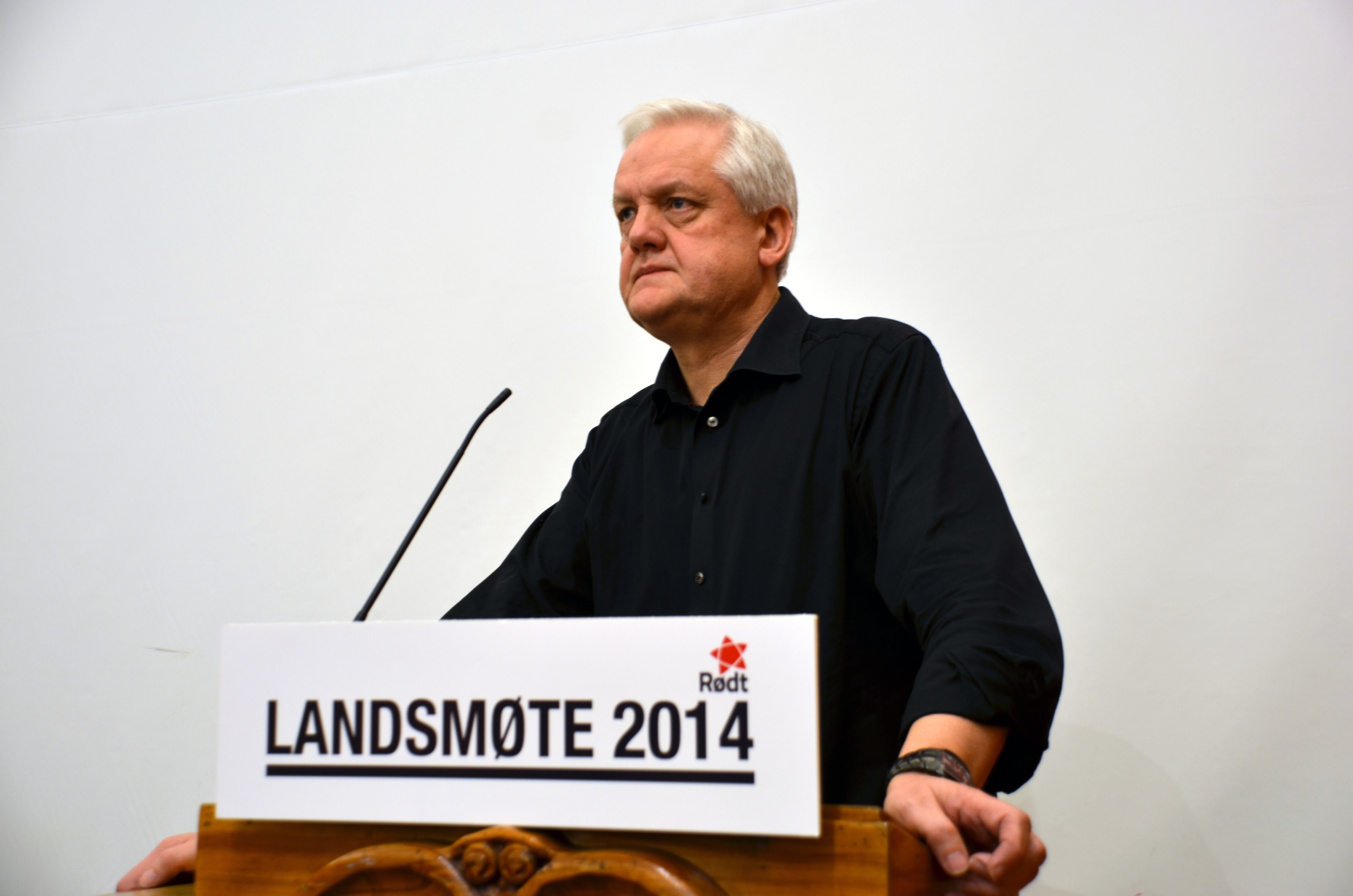

Jørn Magdahl (born 7 April 1950) is a Norwegian politician.

He was the leader of the Red Electoral Alliance from 1995 to 1997. He was succeeded by the more profiled Aslak Sira Myhre. He resides in Skallestad.

Party political offices
Preceded by Aksel Nærstad	Leader of the Red Electoral Alliance; 1995–1997	Succeeded by Aslak Sira Myhre
