= Finn Sjue =

Norwegian journalist and politician (born 1943)

- Born: 1943 (age 82–83); Vestfold, Norway
- Occupations: Psychologist, politician, journalist and teacher
- Known for: Editor of the newspaper Klassekampen 1973–1977; Chairman of the Red Electoral Alliance 1980–1982

Finn Sjue (born 1943) is a Norwegian psychologist, politician, journalist and teacher. He was born in Vestfold. He edited the newspaper Klassekampen from 1973 to 1977. He chaired the Red Electoral Alliance from 1980 to 1982. He has later lectured in journalism at the Oslo University College.

His books include Vi som styrer Norge: Arbeiderpartiet og de hemmelige tjenestene (1992, with Viggo Johansen and Pål T. Jørgensen), De visste alt: En dokumentasjon om niende etasje (1993, with Ronald Bye and Alf R. Jacobsen), Norges hemmelige hær (1995, with Ronald Bye), and Innsyn – slik kikker du politikere og byråkrater i kortene (2009, co-edited with Arne Jensen).

Media offices
Preceded by Sigurd Allern	Editor of Klassekampen; 1973–1977	Succeeded by Egil Fossum
