= Bjørgulv Braanen =

Norwegian newspaper editor

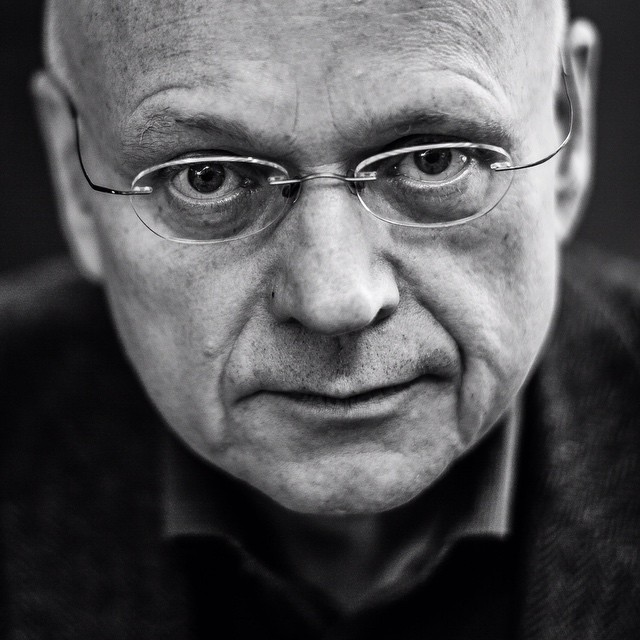
Braanen in 2016

Bjørgulv Braanen (born 14 November 1956) was editor-in-chief of the Norwegian daily newspaper Klassekampen until 2018, when he was succeeded by Mari Skurdal.

== Career ==
Braanen is educated as a welder in addition to have studied history at university. He is former chairman of Red Youth and journalist in Klassekampen (1984–1990) and Dagens Næringsliv (1990–2000). In 2000 he returned to Klassekampen, where he was editor-in-chief from 2002 to 2018, and thereafter political editor.

Party political offices
Preceded by Grete Knudsen	Chairman of Red Youth; 1979–1983	Succeeded by Per Overrein
Media offices
Preceded by Jon Michelet	Editor of Klassekampen; 2002–2018	Succeeded by Mari Skurdal
Awards
Preceded by Nina Witoszek	Recipient of the Fritt Ord Award; 2006	Succeeded by Terje Tvedt
