= Erling Ramnefjell =

Norwegian journalist and editor

Erling Ramnefjell (born 1944) is a Norwegian journalist and editor. He worked with Dagbladet for nearly 37 years and held a variety of roles, including as news editor, deputy editor-in-chief and acting editor-in-chief.

== Career ==
Ramnefjell served his conscription service as a journalist with Mannskapsavisa (now Forsvarets forum). He joined Dagbladet as a journalist in the early 1970s. Eventually he held a variety of management roles, including as news editor, deputy editor-in-chief and acting editor-in-chief. After 20 years in management he became a reporter and commentator again in 1995, and was one of the newspaper's most senior and well-known journalists. He retired from the newspaper in 2008. He is the father of Geir Ramnefjell, who is also an editor at Dagbladet.
