= Rød Front =

Rød Front ('Red Front') was a Norwegian student organization.

It was involved in student politics at the University of Oslo and in the struggle for control over the Norwegian Students' Society. It had an affiliation with the Workers' Communist Party. Several groups of the same name existed in other Norwegian universities.
