= Arild Rønsen =

Norwegian journalist and writer

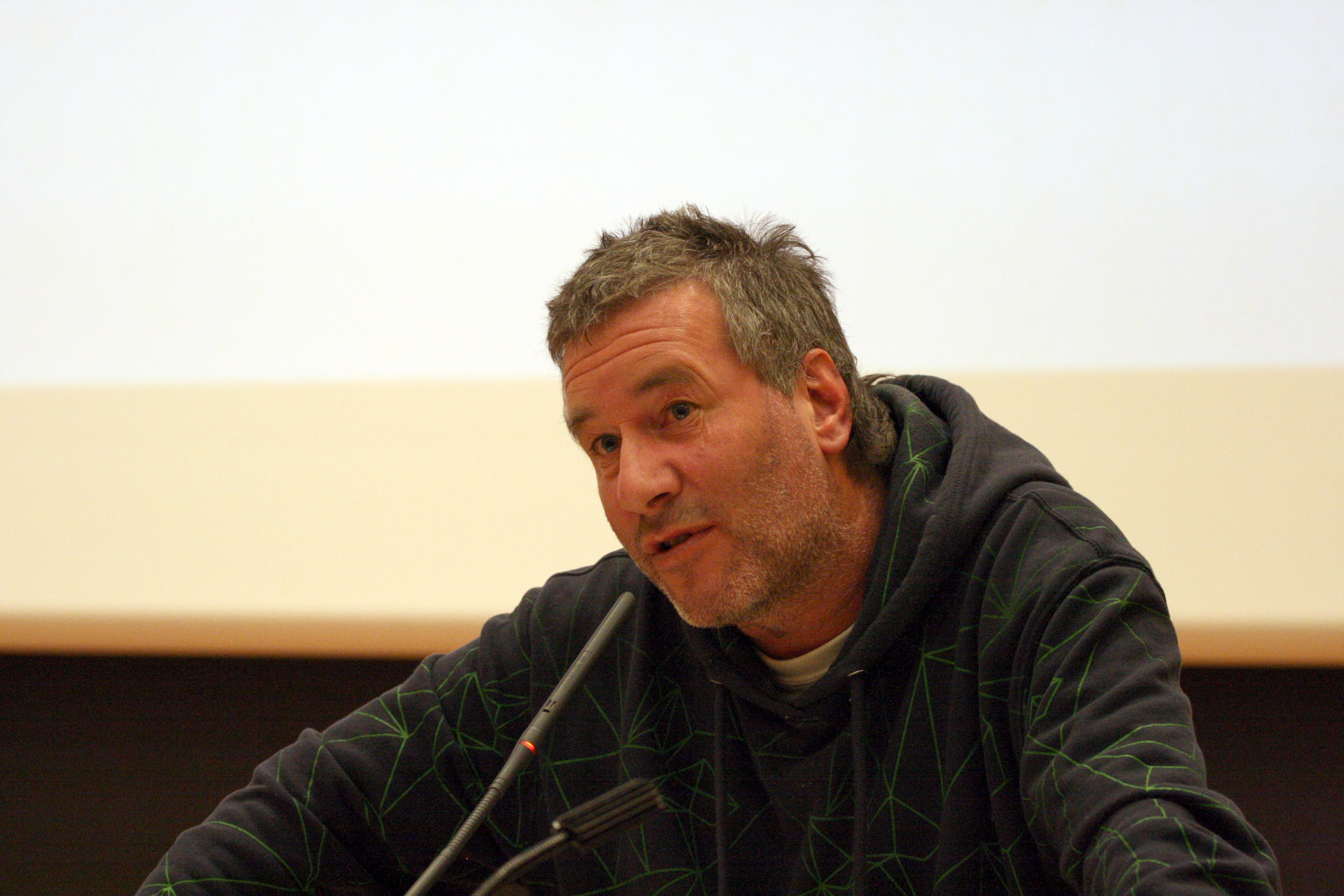
Arild Rønsen, 2009.

Arild Rønsen (born 27 November 1955) is a Norwegian editor and non-fiction writer.

== Early life and career ==
He was born in Oslo and grew up at Valle near Løren. He finished secondary education in 1974. During his time at Foss Upper Secondary School, he became involved with the anti-EEC movement in 1971 and spent the next ten years as a member of the Workers' Communist Party movement.

He entered the workforce as a typographer at the Petlitz printing press in 1976. In 1979 he was hired as a typographer in Arbeiderbladet and in 1982 in Klassekampen. After one year there, he advanced to shift leader. In 1985 he became editor-in-chief of the music magazine Puls. Rønsen became editor after the founder Tore Olsen resigned along with the editorial board to establish a competitor, Beat. Rønsen especially feuded with Beat's later editor-in-chief Tom Skjeklesæther. Skjeklesæther became known as a proponent of Americana and roots music, whereas Rønsen was more interested in British music. Puls declined along with the rest of the Norwegian music press, but after several years as an online magazine only, Rønsen managed to return as a printed magazine in 2008.

In 1991 he founded the publication Fire flate which was the official magazine of the Moldejazz festival. The newspaper was originally a supplement of Puls, which did not come out in 1992 and 1993 but was resumed in 1994 and printed in a circulation of 4,000. He was given the local award Molderosen i 2002. Following Rønsen's harsh criticism of a band on the 2021 festival roster, however, Rønsen was "sacked" in 2022, though all his work with Fire flate was unpaid volunteer work. Fire flate was also discontinued.

In 1996 he sat on the judges panel for TV 2's talent show Stjerner i sikte together with Trond Myhre and Anita Skorgan. He also had a stint as a sports reporter in TV 2. Rønsen followed the sports club Vålerengens IF for several decades and wrote several books about them. In 2004 he penned Enga inside, a reportage that followed the milieu around the men's football team. Rønsen has also translated books such as Christopher Ciccone's My Sister Madonna, David Beckham's and Neil Young's memoirs.
