= Kjersti Ericsson =

Norwegian criminologist and politician

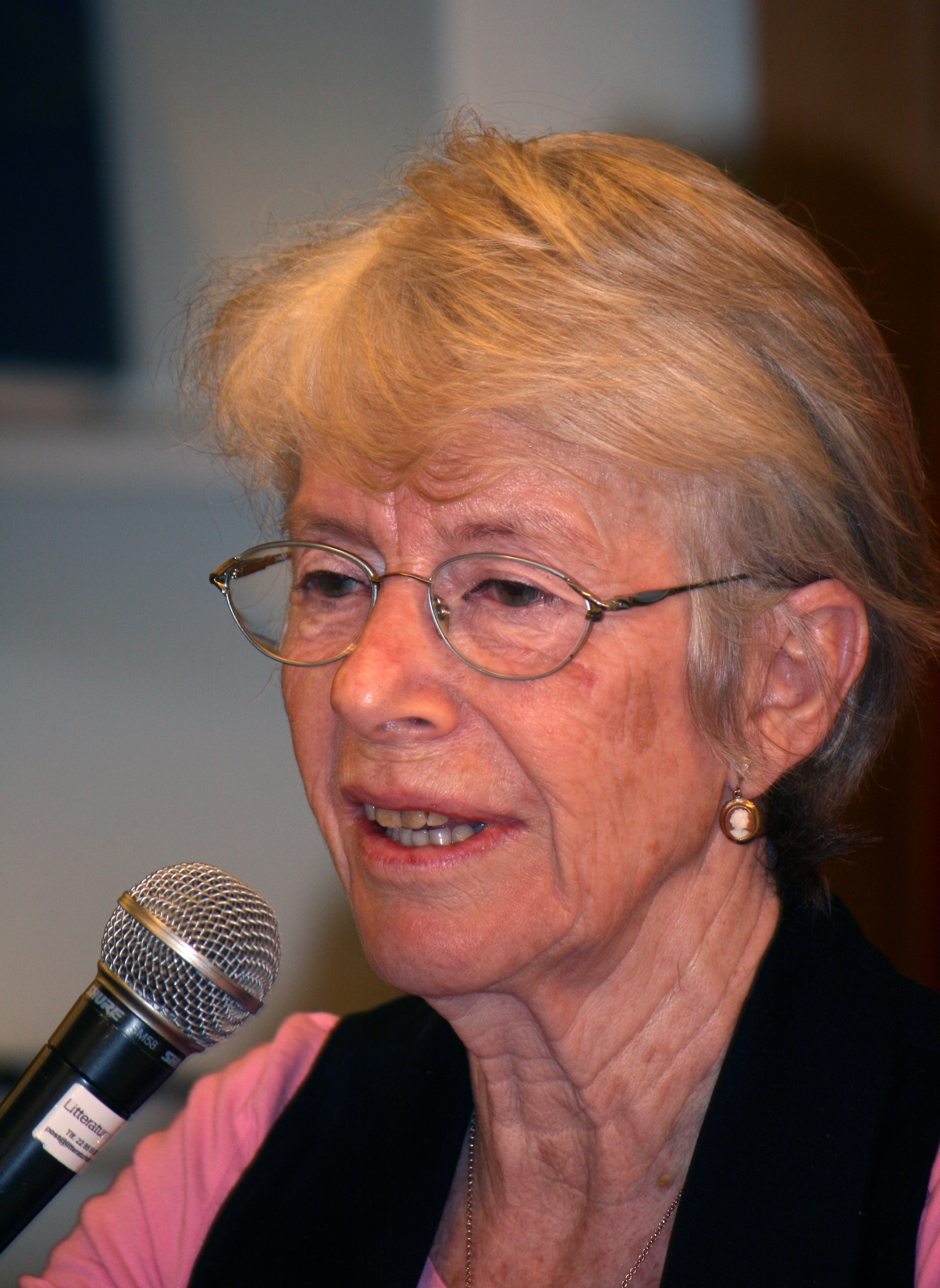
- Born: 18 January 1944 (age 82); Oslo, Norway

Academic background
- Education: University of Oslo

Academic work
- Discipline: Psychologist
- Institutions: University of Oslo
- Website: Official website

Kjersti Ericsson (born 18 January 1944 in Oslo, Norway) is a Norwegian psychologist, criminologist, writer, poet and former politician. She is a professor of criminology at the faculty of law of the University of Oslo.

Ericsson obtained her cand.psychol. degree in 1969, and was a research assistant and lecturer at the department of psychology at the University of Oslo from 1969 to 1978. Since 1978, she has been employed with the department of criminology and sociology of law (formerly the department of criminology and criminal law). She became an associate professor in 1981 and a professor in 1997.

Kjersti Ericsson was leader of the political party Workers' Communist Party (AKP) from 1984 to 1988. From 1980 to 1984, she was deputy leader.

Aside from her academic publications, she has published poetry, novels and political literature in Norwegian, English and German.
