= Jon Michelet =

Norwegian author (1944–2018)

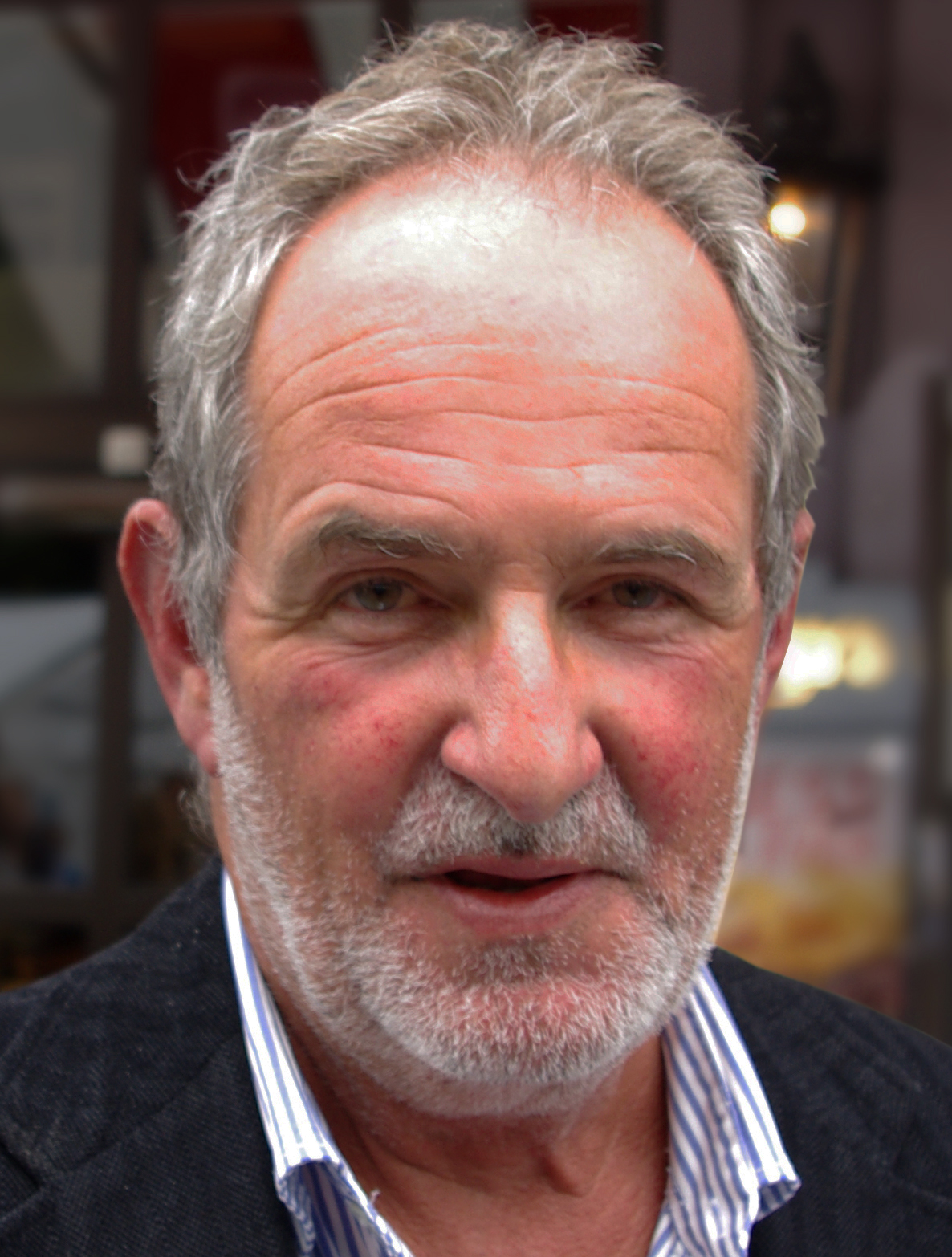
- Michelet in 2011
- Born: 14 July 1944; Moss, Norway
- Died: 14 April 2018 (aged 73); Oslo, Norway
- Occupation: Novelist
- Children: 4
- Website: jonmichelet.com

Jon Michelet (14 July 1944 – 14 April 2018) was a Norwegian novelist. He had experience in various lines of work, including sailor and dock worker and references to these experiences can be found in his writing. His writing spans several genres such as crime novels, newspaper columns, sports journalism and children's books.

== Author and editor ==
One of his best-known books is the action-thriller novel Orion's Belt (1977). The novel was adapted into a 1985 film by the same name, which is regarded as Norway's first modern action film. In 1981, he was awarded the Riverton Prize (best Norwegian crime book of the year) for his crime novel Hvit som snø (White as snow). Twenty years later he won the prize again (as the first author to do so) with Den frosne kvinnen (The frozen woman). His last work became his biggest bestseller: En sjøens helt (A hero of the sea), a six-volume series about Norwegian war sailors during World War II and their destinies. He managed to finish it a week before his death.

He was the editor-in-chief of the Norwegian left-wing daily Klassekampen from 1997 to 2002.

== Positions of trust ==
He had various positions of trust, including being a member of the board of Norsk Styrmandsforening. From 2003 until 2009 he was chairman of the Rivertonklubben, the Norwegian crime writers' society.

== Politician ==
He resided in Larkollen, and was a minor ticket candidate for the Red Party.

== Family ==
He had four daughters, Marte Michelet, who was married to Ali Esbati—an MP in Sweden as of 2014, and Tania Michelet, Ellen Michelet and Stella Burstedt Michelet.

Media offices
| Preceded by Paul Bjerke | Chief editor of Klassekampen; 1997–2002 | Succeeded by Bjørgulv Braanen |
