= Sigurd Allern =

Norwegian academic

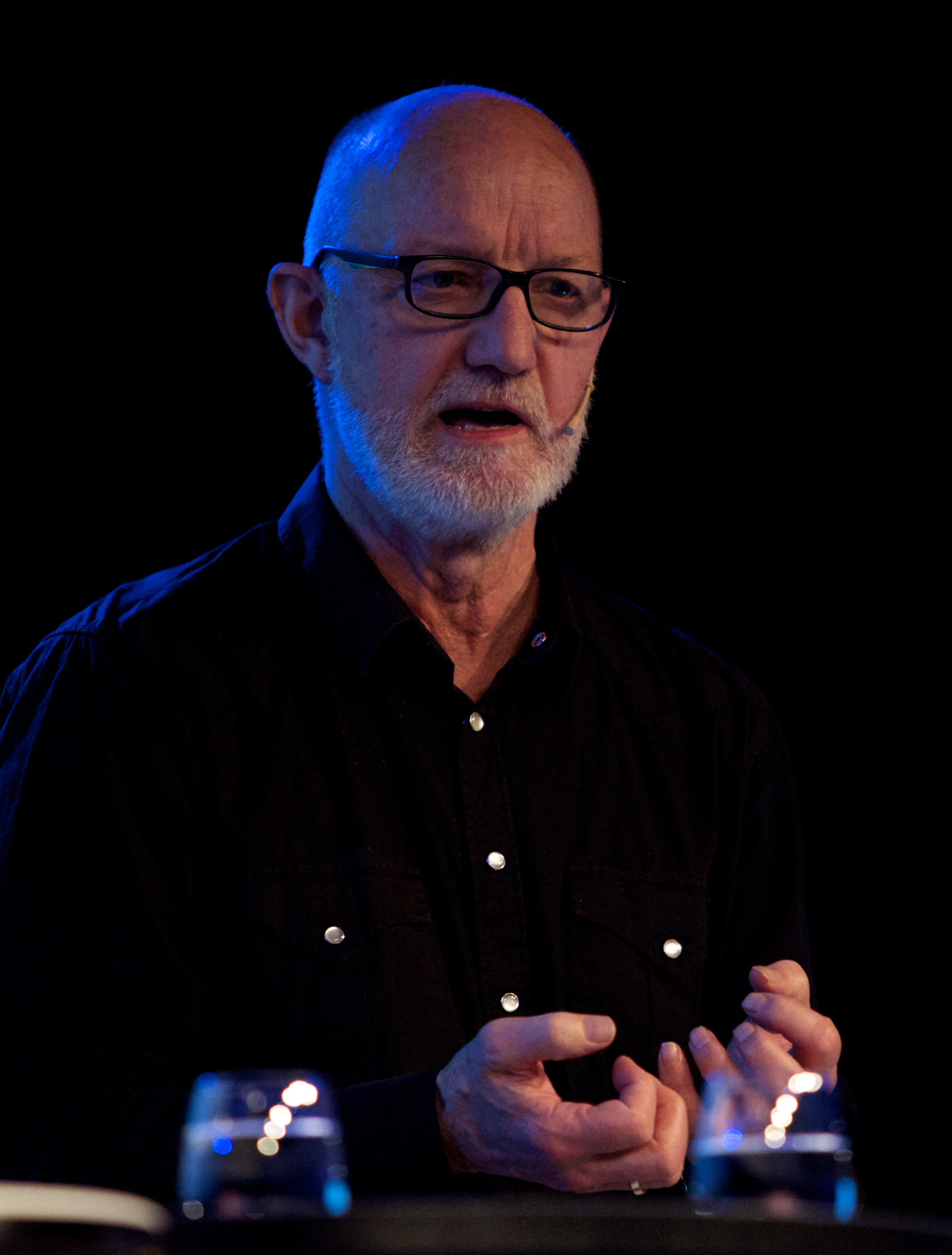
Sigurd Allern

Sigurd Allern (born 5 September 1946) is a Norwegian media theorist and the first professor of journalism at the University of Oslo. He was also one of the central people in starting the Workers' Communist Party of Norway in the early 1970s, and was the first chairman of the party between 1973 and 1975 and at the same time chairman of the Red Electoral Alliance. He was also editor-in-chief of Klassekampen from 1969 to 1970, and again from 1979 to 1995.

Preceded by none	Chairman of Workers' Communist Party; 1973–1975	Succeeded by Pål Steigan
Preceded by none	Chairman of Red Electoral Alliance; 1973–1975	Succeeded by Pål Steigan
Preceded by Finn Aasheim	Editor of Klassekampen; 1969–1970	Succeeded by Finn Sjue
Preceded by Egil Fossum	Editor of Klassekampen; 1979–1995	Succeeded by Paul Bjerke
