= Alf Reidar Jacobsen =

Norwegian writer (born 1950)

- Born: 21 February 1950 (age 76); Hammerfest, Norway
- Other name: Alf R. Jacobsen
- Occupations: Journalist, author
- Awards: Riverton Prize (1988); SKUP Award (1991)

Alf Reidar Jacobsen (born 21 February 1950) is a Norwegian journalist, non-fiction author, novelist, crime fiction author and biographer.

Jacobsen was born in Hammerfest. He has worked as a journalist for the newspapers Finnmark Dagblad, Klassekampen, Verdens Gang, for the magazine Økonomisk Rapport, and for the Norwegian Broadcasting Corporation.

He was awarded the Riverton Prize in 1988 for the novel Kharg. His book Iskyss from 1991, on Soviet espionage in Norway, earned him the SKUP Award, and was the basis for a film in 2008. He published a biography of the whaler Svend Foyn in 2008.

His book Kongens nei was the basis for the 2016 film The King's Choice. The film won eight Amanda Awards.

He has been editor-at-large of the online newspaper Document.no since 2021.

== Bibliography ==
- Stalins gull. Oslo: Bladkompaniet. 1982. ISBN 978-82-509-1172-7.
- Eventyret Anders Jahre. Oslo: Oktober. 1982. ISBN 978-82-7094-311-1.
- Muldvarpene : norsk etterretning fra 1. verdenskrig til Arne Treholt. Oslo: Pax forlag. 1982. ISBN 978-82-7350-010-6.
- Børshaiene : blant raidere og riddere på Oslo børs. Oslo: Pax forlag. 1985. ISBN 978-82-7350-028-1.
- Kampen om Kosmos. Oslo: Pax forlag. 1986. ISBN 978-82-530-1383-1.
- Osiris : en thriller. Oslo: Pax forlag. 1986. ISBN 978-82-530-1381-7.
- Kværner, krig : dagbok fra et aksjeraid. [Oslo]: Cappelen. 1987. ISBN 978-82-02-11187-8.
- Ikkevold-saken – dramatikk, (1987)
- Kharg : thriller. Oslo: Tiden Norsk Forlag. 1988. ISBN 978-82-10-03188-5.
- Svartkammeret : den innerste hemmeligheten. [Oslo]: Cappelen. 1989. ISBN 978-82-02-11218-9.
- Iskyss : om spionasje og kjærlighet i den kalde krigens tid. Oslo: Aschehoug. 1991. ISBN 978-82-574-0899-2.
- Løpende risiko : menneskene, milliardene, makten. Oslo: Aschehoug. 1992. ISBN 978-82-03-17211-3.
- De visste alt : en dokumentasjon om niende etasje – sakprosa sammen med Ronald Bye og Finn Sjue, Tiden (1993)
- Uten skrupler. Oslo: Økonomisk rapport. 1993. ISBN 978-82-91351-00-1.
- Rødt som kirsebær. Oslo: Aschehoug. 1994. ISBN 978-82-03-17472-8.
- Mistenksomhetens pris : krigen om de hemmelige tjenester. Oslo: Aschehoug. 1995. ISBN 978-82-03-26113-8.
- Fra brent jord til Klondyke. Oslo: Universitetsforl. 1998. ISBN 978-82-00-22731-1.
- Kameleon. Oslo: Tiden. 1998. ISBN 978-82-10-04296-6.
- 100 år i norsk mat. [Billingstad]: Nestlé Norge. 1998. ISBN 978-82-994882-0-4.
- Typhoon. Oslo: Tiden. 1999. ISBN 978-82-10-04430-4.
- Tango bacalao. Oslo: Aschehoug. 2000. ISBN 978-82-03-18293-8.
- Scharnhorst. Oslo: Aschehoug. 2001. ISBN 978-82-03-22681-6.
- Forlis : Barentshavets uløste gåter. Oslo: Aschehoug. 2002. ISBN 978-82-03-22777-6.
- Banesår : Tirpitz og jakten på X5. Oslo: Aschehoug. 2003. ISBN 978-82-03-22927-5.
- Til siste slutt : skjebnedrama i krigens avsluttende fase. Oslo: Aschehoug. 2004. ISBN 978-82-03-22903-9.
- Rød August – sakprosa, Aschehoug (2005)
- Nikkel, jern og blod : krigen i nord 1939-1945 – sakprosa, Aschehoug (2006)
- Svend Foyn : fangstpioner og nasjonsbygger – biografi, Aschehoug (2008)
- U-2-affæren – sakprosa, Aschehoug (2009)
- Krysseren Blücher : 9. april 1940 – sakprosa, Vega (2010)
- Kongens nei : 10. april 1940 – sakprosa, Vega (2011)
- Mellom to onder : olje og gass i det 21. århundret : den vanskelige overgangen – sakprosa, Vega (2012)
- Angrep ved daggry : Narvik, 9.–10. april 1940 – sakprosa, Vega (2012)
- Bitter seier : Narvik, 10. april–10. juni 1940 – sakprosa, Vega (2013)
- Miraklet ved Litza : Hitlers første nederlag på Østfronten – sakprosa, Vega (2014)
- Djevelens kobber – kriminalroman, Vega (2015)
- 1945 : hat, hevn, håp : historien om det moderne Norge 1945–2000 – sakprosa, Vega (2015) ISBN 9788282114196
- På havets bunn : sjøkrig og skattejakt – sakprosa, Vega (2015)
- Kryssild : krig og kjærlighet i Atlanterhavskonvoiene 1940-41 – sakprosa, Vega (2016)
- Først med det siste : NTB i nyhetenes tjeneste gjennom 150 år : 1867-2017 – sakprosa, Vega (2017)
- Skjebnehøst : Nord-Norge 1944 – sakprosa, Vega (2017)
- I Stalins skygge : 1946-1949 – sakprosa, Vega (2018)
- Farlig farvann : Hurtigruten i nord 1940-45 – sakprosa, Vega (2019)
- 9. april : time for time – sakprosa, Vega (2020) ISBN 978-82-8211-666-4
- Stalins svøpe : KGB, AP og kommunismens medløpere – sakprosa, Document (2021) ISBN 978-82-7519-241-5
- Tredje verdenskrig ved Nordkapp – sakprosa, Document (2023) ISBN 978-82-7519-265-1
- Den usynlige energikrigen – sakprosa, Document (2025) ISBN 978-82-7519-281-1
