= Aksel Nærstad =

Norwegian political activist (1952–2022)

Axel Nærstad
- Born: 1 January 1952; Rælingen, Norway
- Died: 22 October 2022 (aged 70)
- Education: Trained as carpenter
- Occupations: Political activist, advisor

Aksel Nærstad (1 January 1952 – 22 October 2022) was a Norwegian political activist and advisor.

== Political career ==
Nærstad chaired the Red Electoral Alliance from 1987 to 1995.

From 1995 to 1997 he chaired the board of the newspaper Klassekampen.

He chaired the Norwegian Social Forum /Globaliseringskonferansen from first forum in 2001 and for eight years. He was also the first chair of the Norwegian Trade Campaign from 2003 until 2012.

He was senior policy advisor in the Norwegian NGO, the Development Fund. He was also international coordinator of the More and Better Network, a global network of farmers' and fisherfolks' organizations and NGOs.

== Early and personal life ==
Nærstad was born in Rælingen, Akershus on 1 January 1952, a son of Andreas Nærstad and Emmy Solveig Henriksen. After secondary school, he received practical training as carpenter.

Residing in Asker, Nærstad died on 22 October 2022, at the age of 70.

== Selected works ==
- Norrøna-konflikten (1985)
- Kjeller Jern og Metall 75 år (1992)

Party political offices
Preceded by Jahn Arne Olsen	Leader of the Red Electoral Alliance; 1987–1995	Succeeded by Jørn Magdahl
