= County Lists for Environment and Solidarity =

Norwegian electoral alliance

County Lists for Environment and Solidarity (Norwegian: Fylkeslistene for Miljø og Solidaritet, FMS) was an electoral alliance in Norway, consisting of the Red Electoral Alliance, Communist Party of Norway, local groups and independents, which contested the 1989 parliamentary election in Norway. The alliance got 22 126 votes (0.8%), which was insufficient to win a seat.
