= Gnist =

Norwegian political magazine

Gnist (Spark) is a Norwegian quarterly Marxist periodical published by the left-wing Red Party.

The magazine was started with the name Røde Fane (Red Banner) in 1969. In 2005 it changed its name to Rødt! (Red!), and in 2017 again to Gnist. Its political positions are Marxist. Erik Ness was the executive editor from 1993 until 2017, when Ingrid Baltzersen took over.

Controversy arose in 2009, when the magazine ran an article promoting Bosnian genocide denial.
