= Geir Ramnefjell =

Norwegian journalist

Geir Flaaen Ramnefjell (born 8 June 1981) is a Norwegian journalist, who has served as the political editor of Dagbladet since 2016. He formerly served as the newspaper's culture editor from 2011 to 2016. Ramnefjell started his career as a journalist with Romerikes Blad and joined Dagbladet in 2005. In 2017 he won a SKUP Award for his critical journalism on the Norwegian royal family's economic affairs. He is the son of long-time Dagbladet journalist and editor Erling Ramnefjell.
