= Left-wing antiglobalism =

Socialist and labor-oriented opposition to globalization

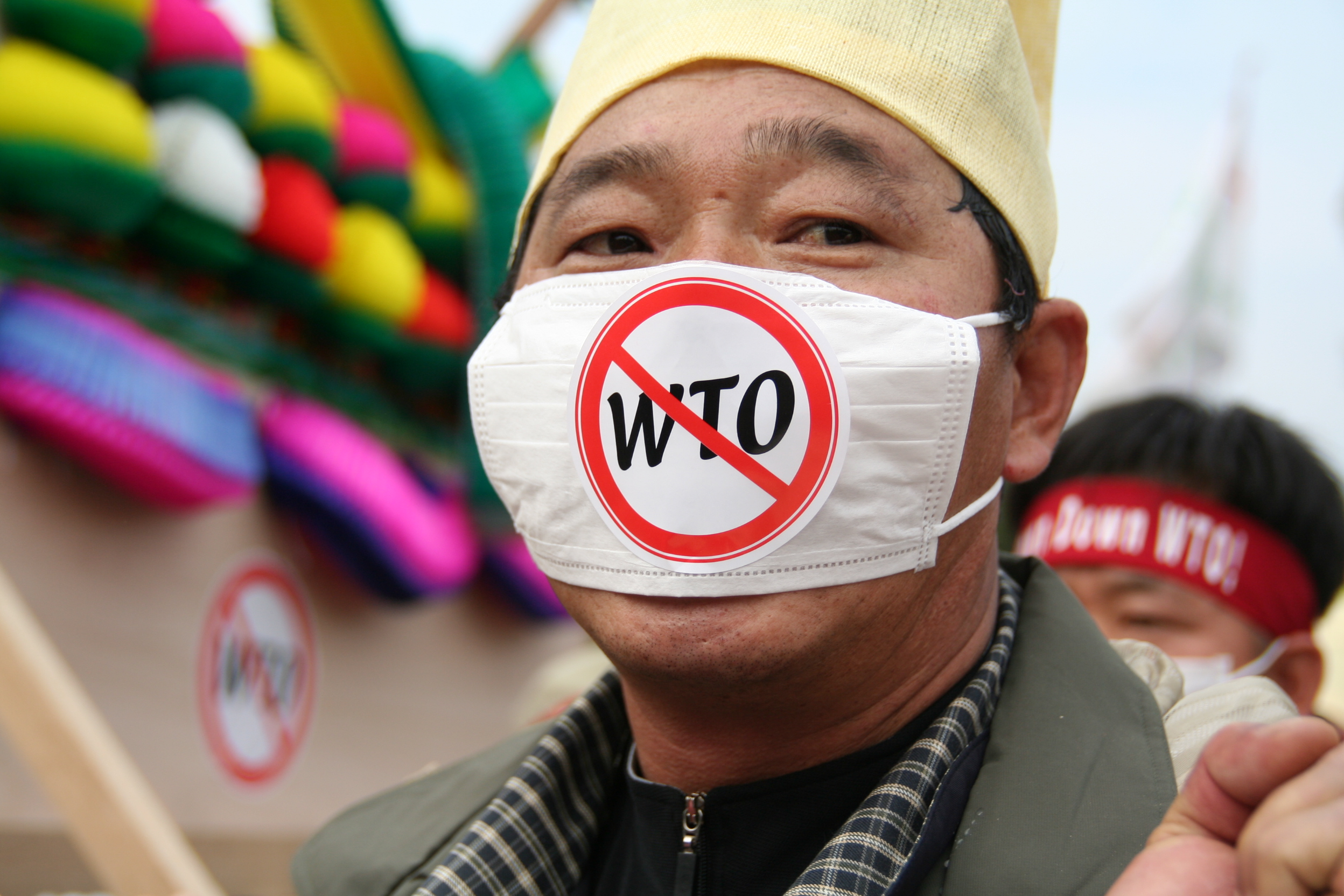
A protester in Hong Kong wearing an anti-WTO face mask

Left-wing antiglobalism (Note: Also referred to as the antiglobalist left and the anti-globalization left) refers to left-wing political stances that oppose globalization from an anti-imperialist, autarkic, anti-capitalist, or socialist perspective. Unlike right-wing antiglobalists, who focus on national identity and immigration, left-wing anti-globalists mainly criticize the erosion of labor rights and environmental protection caused by neoliberalism, multinational corporations, and global capitalism.

== Overview ==
Left-wing antiglobalism is closely linked to the alter-globalization movement, which advocates for "globalization from below"—prioritizing human rights, environmental sustainability, and economic justice over corporate profits. Proponents argue that the current model of globalization, often referred to as the "Washington Consensus," facilitates a "race to the bottom" where countries compete by lowering wages and deregulating industries to attract foreign investment.

== Key tenets ==
=== Economic sovereignty and labor rights ===
Left-wing antiglobalists argue that international trade agreements, such as NAFTA or the World Trade Organization (WTO) mandates, undermine the ability of sovereign states to implement progressive economic policies. They criticize the "Investor-State Dispute Settlement" (ISDS) mechanisms for allowing corporations to sue governments over public interest laws.

=== Environmentalism ===
Critics argue that globalization encourages the relocation of industries to countries with weak environmental regulations, leading to global carbon leakage. Left-wing antiglobalists advocate for localism to reduce the carbon footprint of global trade.

=== Solidarity with the Global South ===
Left-wing antiglobalists often view globalization as a form of neo-colonialism in the Global South. They support debt relief and the protection of local agriculture in Third World countries.

== Notable figures and movements ==
- Jeremy Corbyn and Bernie Sanders: Democratic socialist politicians who were described as left-wing antiglobalists for their opposition to trade deals like the Trans-Pacific Partnership (TPP).
- José Mujica: Former President of Uruguay, known for his speeches at the United Nations criticizing "hyper-consumption" driven by global capitalism.
- Workers' Party of Korea (WPK): The North Korean communist party's Juche ideology calls for developing nations to achieve political, economic, and military self-reliance. Under the influence of the Juche ideology, North Korea developed what has been called the "most autarkic industrial economy in the world".
- Zapatista Army of National Liberation (EZLN): Their 1994 uprising, which was guided by libertarian socialism and indigenous values, specifically opposed the implementation of NAFTA in Mexico.

== Historical predecessors ==
=== Cambodia and the Khmer Rouge ===
Cambodia under the Communist Party of Kampuchea and their Khmer Rouge members heavily promoted a domestic policy of autarky. Party leadership was impressed with the self-sufficient manner in which the mountain tribes of Cambodia lived, which the party believed was a form of primitive communism. The Khmer Rouge's ideology developed the concept that the nation should take "agriculture as the basic factor and use the fruits of agriculture to build industry".

In 1975, Khmer Rouge representatives to China said that the party's belief was that achieving absolute self-sufficiency and the total collectivization of agriculture was capable of "[creating] a complete communist society without wasting time on the intermediate steps". Cambodian society was accordingly classified into peasant "base people", who would be the bulwark of the country's agrarian transformation; and urban "new people", who would need to be educated in Khmer Rouge ideology. The opposition of the peasantry and the urban population in Khmer Rouge ideology was heightened by the structure of the Cambodian rural economy, where small farmers and peasants had historically suffered from indebtedness to urban money-lenders rather than suffering from indebtedness to landlords. The Khmer Rouge policies of evacuating major urban towns to the countryside and the immediate abolition of money were viewed positively by the party's peasant supporters as a major form of debt forgiveness since it removed the main source of their debts.

=== Hoxhaism and isolationism ===
Albania under Enver Hoxha's Hoxhaist ideology adopted a policy of extreme autarky and isolationism, cutting off ties with both the capitalist West and the "revisionist" East.

Hoxha was critical of the United States and Yugoslavia, condemning the latter as social imperialist. After the death of Joseph Stalin and the Sino-Albanian split, he extended his social imperialist critique to the Soviet Union and China. Hoxha personally held the view that Titoism, Khrushchevism, and Eurocommunism, among other communist ideologies, were "anti-Marxist" in overall practice, and he insisted that nations assert their right to pursue sovereignty and socialism by different paths dictated by the conditions in those countries, rather than adopt an existing global model.

== See also ==
- Alter-globalization
- Anti-capitalism
- Indigenism
- Left-conservatism
- Left-wing nationalism
- Left-wing populism
- Pål Steigan
- Post-growth
- Protectionism
- Right-wing antiglobalism
