= Jon Martin Larsen =

Norwegian journalist

Jon Martin Larsen (born 1975) is a Norwegian journalist, media executive, government official, humanitarian and LGBT rights activist. He has worked as a journalist or editor with Verdens Gang and Dagsavisen, as editor-in-chief and CEO of the newspaper Akershus Amtstidende and as a communications director with the Gender Equality and Anti-Discrimination Ombud, the Norwegian Red Cross and the International Committee of the Red Cross. He lectures in journalism at Kristiania University College, where he researches the use of communication to improve the lives of the LGBT+ community. He has also been active within the National Association for Lesbians, Gays, Bisexuals and Transgender People and was a candidate for the presidency of the organization in 2016 (he lost).

== Career ==
He was a journalist with Verdens Gang, news editor of Dagsavisen, communications director of the Norwegian Red Cross, spokesperson and communications director of the International Committee of the Red Cross' presence in Israel and Palestine, editor-in-chief and CEO of the newspaper Akershus Amtstidende and communications director of the Gender Equality and Anti-Discrimination Ombud. He lectures in journalism at the Kristiania University College, where he researches the use of communication to improve the lives of the LGBT+ community. He was one of the candidates to become president of the National Association for Lesbians, Gays, Bisexuals and Transgender People in 2016.
