= Regine Ramm Bjerke =

Norwegian judge

Regine Ramm Bjerke (born 18 May 1949) is a Norwegian judge.

== Career ==
In 2000, she became a presiding judge in Borgarting Court of Appeal. She was a member of the Lund Commission from 1994 to 1996, together with Ketil Lund, Berge Furre, Torkel Hovland and Ingse Stabel. She is also a board member of Lovdata.
