= Workers' Communist Party (Norway) =

Workers' Communist Party Arbeidernes Kommunistparti
- Abbreviation: AKP
- Founded: 1973
- Dissolved: 2007
- Merged into: Red Party
- Headquarters: Oslo
- Newspaper: Klassekampen (1973-1991)
- Youth wing: Red Youth
- Electoral front: Red Electoral Alliance
- Ideology: Communism; Marxism–Leninism; Mao Zedong Thought; Anti-revisionism
- Political position: Far-left
- International affiliation: ICMLPO

Website
- akp.no

The Workers' Communist Party (Norwegian: Arbeidernes Kommunistparti, AKP) was a Norwegian communist party (1973–2007). AKP was a Maoist party and one of two communist parties in Norway; the other was the older Communist Party of Norway which had remained pro-Soviet. The relationship between the two parties was characterized by strong hostility.

AKP was founded in 1973, as Arbeidernes Kommunistparti (marxist-leninistene). It did not participate directly in elections, but members had "activity duty", meaning that they were to work for the party's goals – passive members were not accepted. The precise number of its members is unknown. On 22 February 2006, the party opened some of its archives to the public, in a move the party argued was to hit out at all the rumours surrounding the party.

It was a predecessor of the current party the Red Party, founded on 10 March 2007.

== History ==
Two trends led to the formation of AKP(m–l):

- The radical movements of Western academic environments in the late 1960s and early 1970s, particularly within the context of the Vietnam War.
- The Sino-Soviet split between the Soviet Union and China, which caused an ideological crisis among an older generation of communists.

The founders of AKP(m–l) came from what was then known as SUF, or Sosialistisk Ungdomsforbund (Socialist Youth League). SUF had been started as the youth wing of the Sosialistisk Folkeparti, but broke away in 1969 as it developed into a marxist-leninist direction. Following the split SUF was renamed SUF(m–l).

As a result of the activity duty, many party members practiced "self-proletarisation" on the party's orders, working as manual labourers, especially in the period from 1974 to 1976. Later, the party encouraged its well-educated members to take work as teachers, particularly in higher education.

As a part of their policy, AKP members have joined and tried to influence several voluntary organisations in socialist direction, particularly those related to "feminism", labor unions and anti-racism.

AKP did not put its name on election ballots, choosing instead to work through Red Electoral Alliance (RV), originally AKPs electoral face, but from 1990 a party of its own without any formal link to AKP, though most of AKPs members were also members of RV.

In March 2007, AKP and Red Electoral Alliance (RV) merged, and formed the party Red, a revolutionary party with a programme supporting communism. Some former members of AKP have argued that since the party Red does not have activity duty or democratic centralism, it is not a communist party, while others have argued that a communist program and the fact that like traditional communist parties, Red is organized in cells, it is a communist party. Some former members of AKP, especially members of AKP's student organization, NKS, formed a marxist-leninist front, KP(m–l) together with the Marxist-Leninist Group Revolusjon. This front was meant to be an organisation with the purpose of building a traditional marxist-leninist party.

Klassekampen (Class Struggle) used to be the party's daily newspaper in the 1970s, but it has been associated with a slightly wider political spectrum since the 1990s. Red now owns 20% of the stocks in Klassekampen, the amount AKP owned before the merge with RV. AKP was also associated to Oktober Forlag, a publisher. From early 2000s the party published the monthly newspaper akp.no, named after the party's website, and throughout its existence it published a quarterly magazine for Marxist debate, first named Røde Fane (Red Standard), then from 2005 Rødt! (Red! – this name might have inspired the name of the new party). The newspaper akp.no continues as Red's party newspaper, under the name Rødt Nytt (Red News). The magazine Rødt! is continued under the ownership of the party Red. In 2017, it changed its name to Gnist.

== Controversy ==
AKP and the Norwegian ML-movement were at times criticised for support of Marxist and communist regimes in other parts of the world, including the regimes of Joseph Stalin, and Pol Pot. AKP openly endorsed the Khmer Rouge of Cambodia, and when that party's forces invaded Phnom Penh, Klassekampen had "Long live the free Cambodia" as their front page headline. Support from AKP continued in spite of the killings which were reported during Pol Pot's rule. At that time, AKP considered these reports to be a part of a smear campaign against the new regime, and AKP had delegations visiting the country.

Much of the party's inner workings have been clandestine in nature, for instance the precise number of members is kept secret. The party program has been considered violent and extreme since it called for armed revolution before 1990, and kept the possibility of having to "defend the revolution with arms" open since.

In 2003, two former members of the party's leadership, Finn Sjue and Egil Fossum, apologized for the totalitarian culture in the party.

== Party leaders ==
- Sigurd Allern 1973–1975
- Pål Steigan 1975–1984
- Kjersti Ericsson 1984–1988
- Siri Jensen 1988–1992
- Solveig Aamdal 1992–1997
- Jorun Gulbrandsen 1997–2006
- Ingrid Baltzersen 2006–2007

== See also ==
- Rød Front
- List of anti-revisionist groups
