= Association of Norwegian Editors =

The Association of Norwegian Editors (Norwegian: Norsk Redaktørforening, NR) is a Norwegian interest group for editors and middle managers in the news media. It is a member of the Norwegian Press Association.

The association was established in 1950 and has approximately 760 members. It is intended to "safeguard the professional interests and editorial independence of its members, ensure freedom of expression, public access to government documents, protection of sources, develop journalistic skills and defend press ethics and self-regulation".
