= Paul Bjerke =

Norwegian newspaper editor

Paul Bjerke (born 2 October 1952) is a Norwegian media scientist.

He currently works as a research fellow at the Volda University College and the research institute De Facto, having graduated from the University of Oslo with the mag.art degree in 1982. Bjerke was the editor-in-chief of Klassekampen from 1995 to 1997, and still has a column there.

Preceded by Sigurd Allern	Editor of Klassekampen; 1995–1997	Succeeded by Jon Michelet
