= Red Electoral Alliance =

Red Electoral Alliance Rød Valgallianse
- Leader: Torstein Dahle
- Founded: 1973
- Dissolved: 2007
- Succeeded by: Red Party
- Headquarters: Osterhausgate 27; Oslo
- Youth wing: Rød Ungdom
- Ideology: Revolutionary socialism; Marxism; Democratic socialism (from 1991)
- Political position: Left-wing to far-left
- European affiliation: The European Alliance of EU-critical Movements (observer)
- Colours: Red

Website
- Official Website

Red Electoral Alliance (Bokmål: Rød Valgallianse, Nynorsk: Raud Valallianse, RV) was an alliance of far-left groups formed into a Norwegian political party to promote revolutionary socialist ideals into the Norwegian parliament. The party dissolved itself on 10 March 2007, when it participated in the founding of a new party, Red (Rødt).

Raud Ungdom or Rød Ungdom (Red Youth) was their youth organization.

== History ==
While it was formed in 1973 as an election front for the Worker's Communist Party (Marxist-Leninist) (Norwegian: Arbeidernes Kommunistparti (m-l), AKP(ml)), the Red Electoral Alliance became an independent party in 1991, and scrapped many Leninist ideas. It remained a revolutionary socialist party that promoted an ideology based upon Marxism.

From 1993 to 1997, Erling Folkvord represented RV in Stortinget, the Norwegian parliament. In 1997, the party got their highest recorded percentage of votes, with 1.7%. In spite of this, Folkvord lost his seat and no new seats were won.

Torstein Dahle, an economist at Bergen University College, was elected leader in 2003 and re-elected in March 2005. Following the 2005 election it was clear that their work to regain their place in the parliament had failed. They received 1.2% of the national total of votes. It was clear that in order to be represented in parliament, they had to win a large share of votes in Hordaland or Oslo. However their best result was 3.4% in Hordaland.

On 10 March 2007, the party dissolved itself, as it merged with the AKP into a new party, Red, with Dahle as its leader. Due to Norwegian election laws, the name Red Electoral Alliance was kept for the 2007 local elections. The party currently has 57 representatives in town halls nationwide.

== Party leaders ==
- 1973–1975 — Sigurd Allern^{1}
- 1975–1979 — Pål Steigan^{1}
- 1979–1981 — Hilde Haugsgjerd
- 1981–1983 — Finn Sjue
- 1983–1987 — Jahn Arne Olsen
- 1987–1995 — Aksel Nærstad
- 1995–1997 — Jørn Magdahl
- 1997–2003 — Aslak Sira Myhre
- 2003–2007 — Torstein Dahle

^{1} Until 1979, the leader of AKP was also the leader of RV.

== Parliamentary election results ==
| Election year | # of overall votes | % of overall vote | # of overall seats won | +/– |
|---|---|---|---|---|
| 1973 | 9,360 | 0.43 | 0 / 155 | |
| 1977 | 14,515 | 0.63 | 0 / 155 | 0 |
| 1981 | 17,844 | 0.72 | 0 / 155 | 0 |
| 1985 | 14,818 | 0.57 | 0 / 157 | 0 |
| 1989 | *22,139 | *0.83 | 0 / 165 | 0 |
| 1993 | 26,360 | 1.07 | 1 / 165 | ▲1 |
| 1997 | 43,252 | 1.67 | 0 / 165 | ▼1 |
| 2001 | 30,015 | 1.18 | 0 / 165 | 0 |
| 2005 | 32,355 | 1.23 | 0 / 169 | 0 |

*: In 1989 RV participated in an electoral alliance with other groups called County Lists for Environment and Solidarity.
