= Mímir Kristjánsson =

Norwegian politician

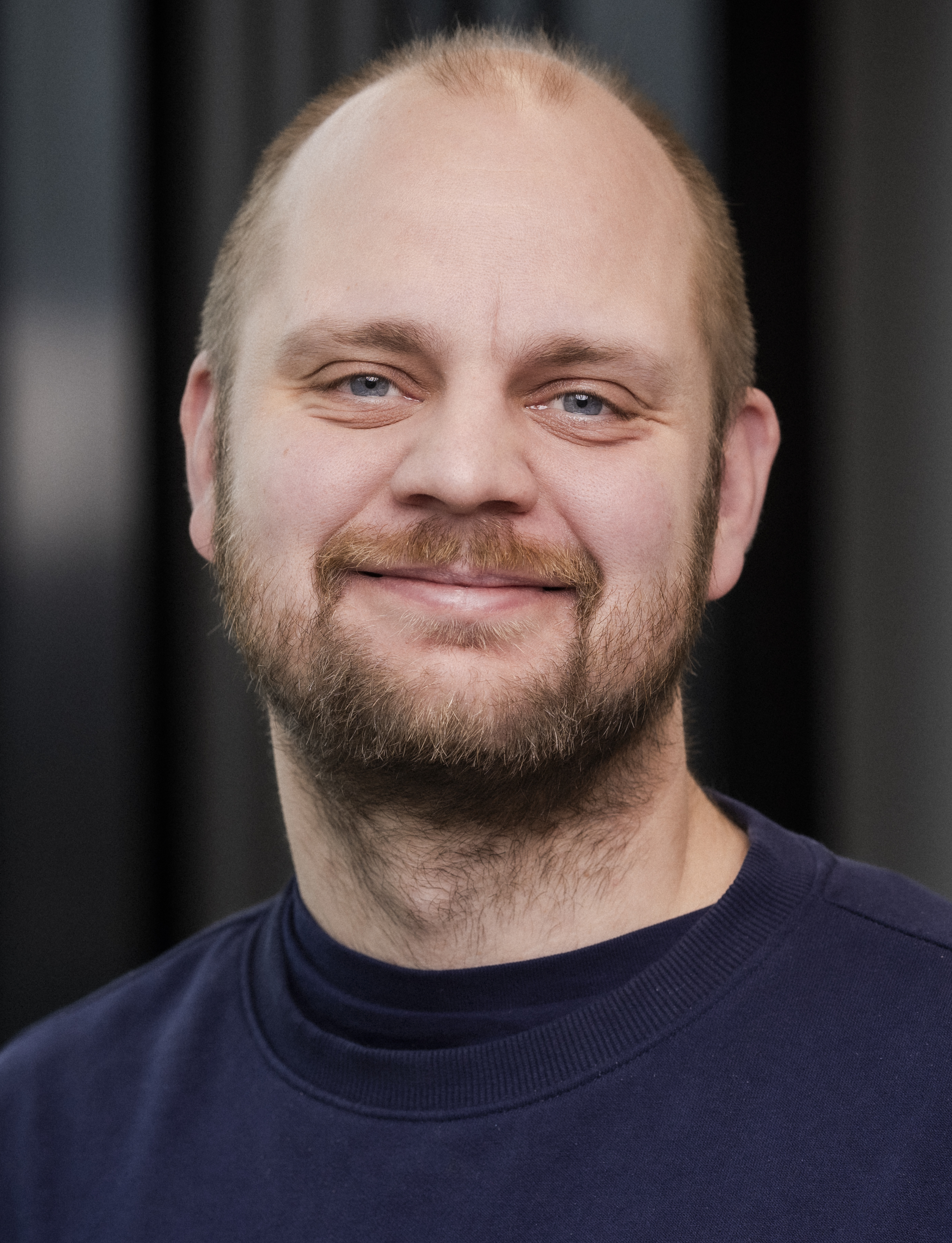

Member of the Storting
- Incumbent
- Assumed office 1 October 2021
- Constituency: Rogaland

Leader of the Red Youth
- In office April 2006 – June 2008
- Preceded by: Bjørnar Moxnes
- Succeeded by: Mari Eifring

Personal details
- Born: 17 August 1986 (age 40) Stavanger, Rogaland, Norway
- Party: Red
- Domestic partner(s): Sofie Marhaug (from 2023); Mathilde Holdhus (until 2021)
- Children: 3
- Occupation: Politician; Journalist; Author

Kristján Mímir Kristjánsson (born 17 August 1986) is an Icelandic-Norwegian politician representing the Red Party. He is currently a member of the Storting for Rogaland since 2021. He was formerly a city councilor in Stavanger and a political journalist for Klassekampen.

== Personal life ==
He hails from Stavanger and has an Icelandic father and a Norwegian mother.

He was in a relationship with Mathilde Holdhus, with whom he has two children. In 2022, he revealed that they had separated the year before shortly after their second child was born.

In August 2022, he confirmed that he was in a relationship with fellow Red Party MP Sofie Marhaug. In October 2023, Marhaug moved from her native Bergen to Stavanger in order to live with Kristjánsson. In February 2026, they announced that they were expecting their first child together.

== Career ==
=== Red Youth ===
He served as the leader of Norway's Red Youth between April 2006 and June 2008, and the secretary of the Red Party's election campaign from June 2008 until the 2009 Norwegian parliamentary election.

=== Local politics ===
He was elected to the Stavanger city council in the 2019 local election, and also became the leader for the City Committee for Labour and Salary.

=== Party politics ===
In April 2024, both he and his partner Sofie Marhaug announced their candidacies for deputy leader of their party at the extraordinary convention to be held in May. The party's electoral committee ultimately opted to suggest Marhaug as deputy leader ahead of the party convention, with Marie Sneve Martinussen as leader.

=== Parliament ===
Kristjánsson was elected to the Storting in the 2021 election.

In March 2022, he stated that it was the right thing to do for Minister of Labour Hadia Tajik to resign.

In April 2026, he was reported to the police after sending threatening messages to a local residence from Bryne who had criticised him and his party in a social media comment section. Kristjánsson issued an apology for his messages and regretted his actions.

== Bibliography ==
In October 2011, he published a book titled De superrike (The Super Rich).
