= 2013 Norwegian parliamentary election =

- 8 and 9 September 2013

All 169 seats in the Storting 85 seats needed for a majority
- Registered: 3,641,753
- Turnout: 78.32% (▲1.95 pp)
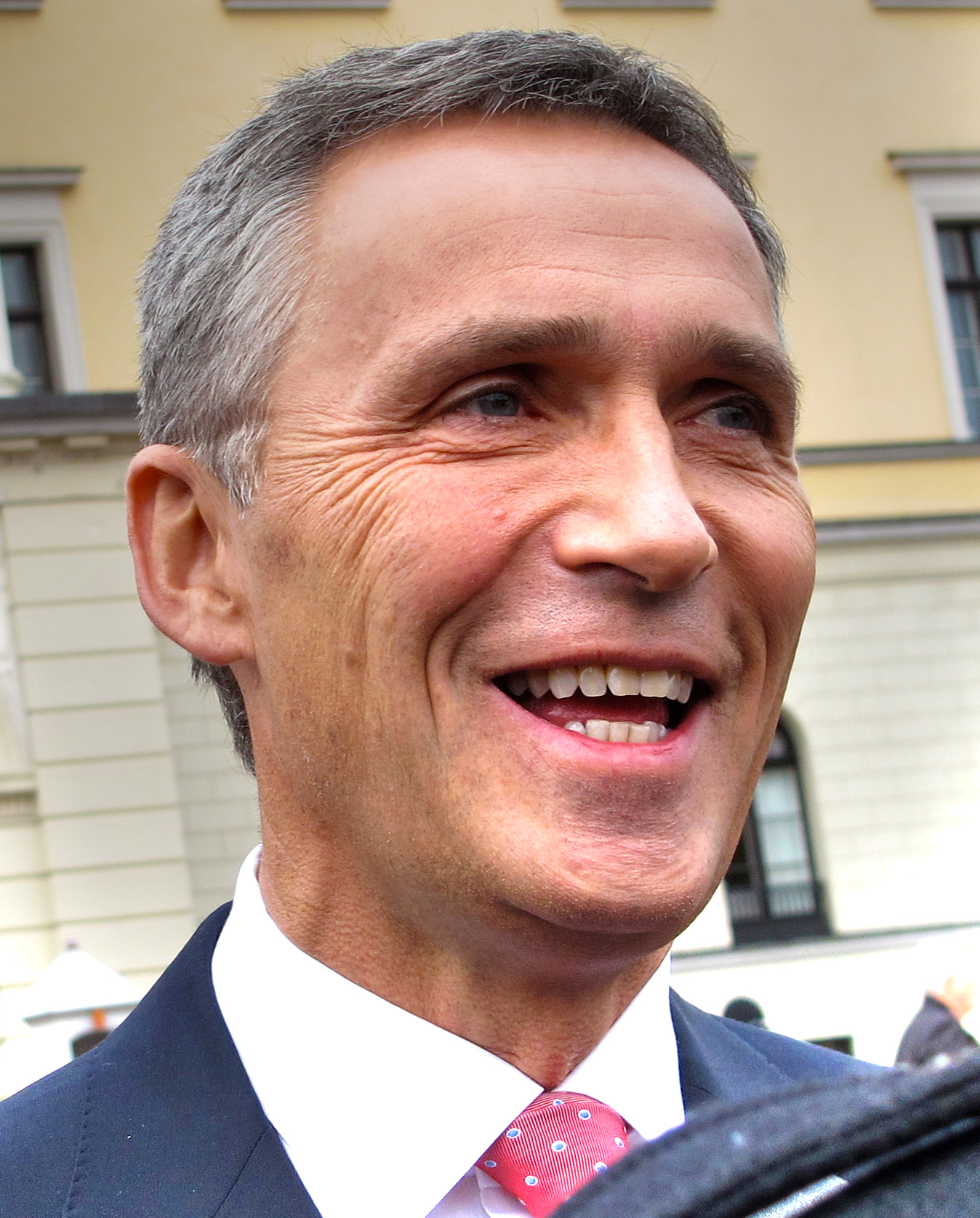

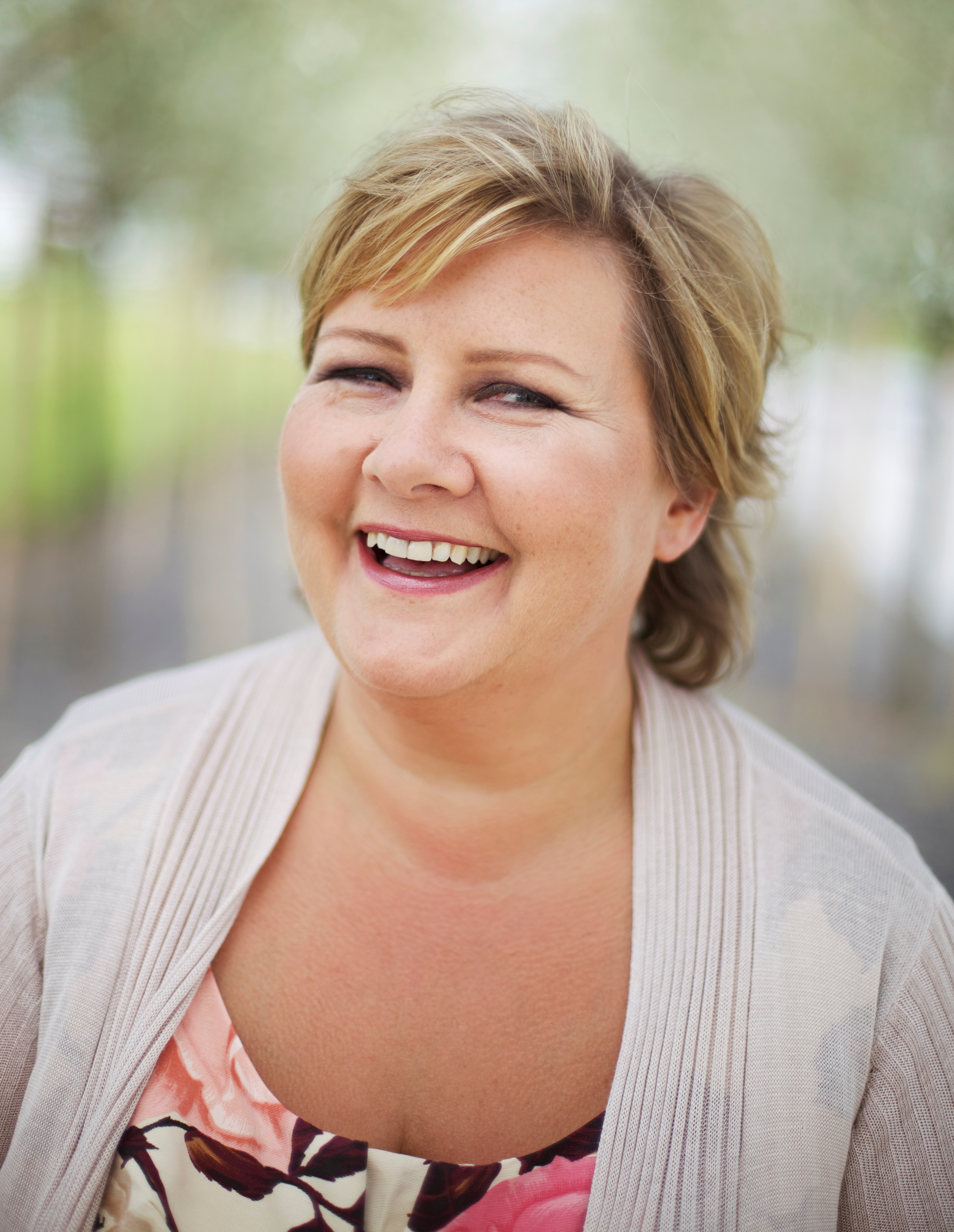

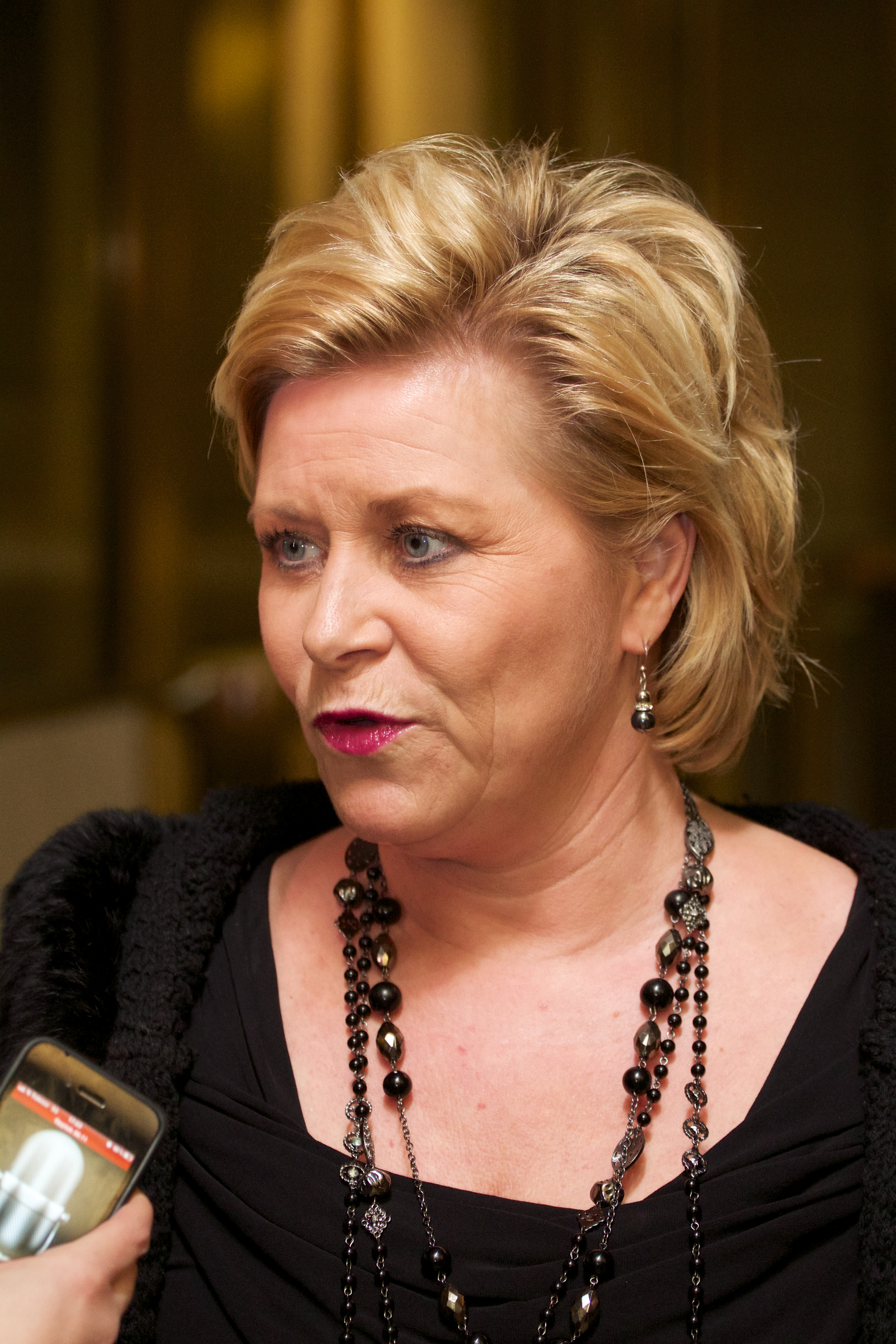

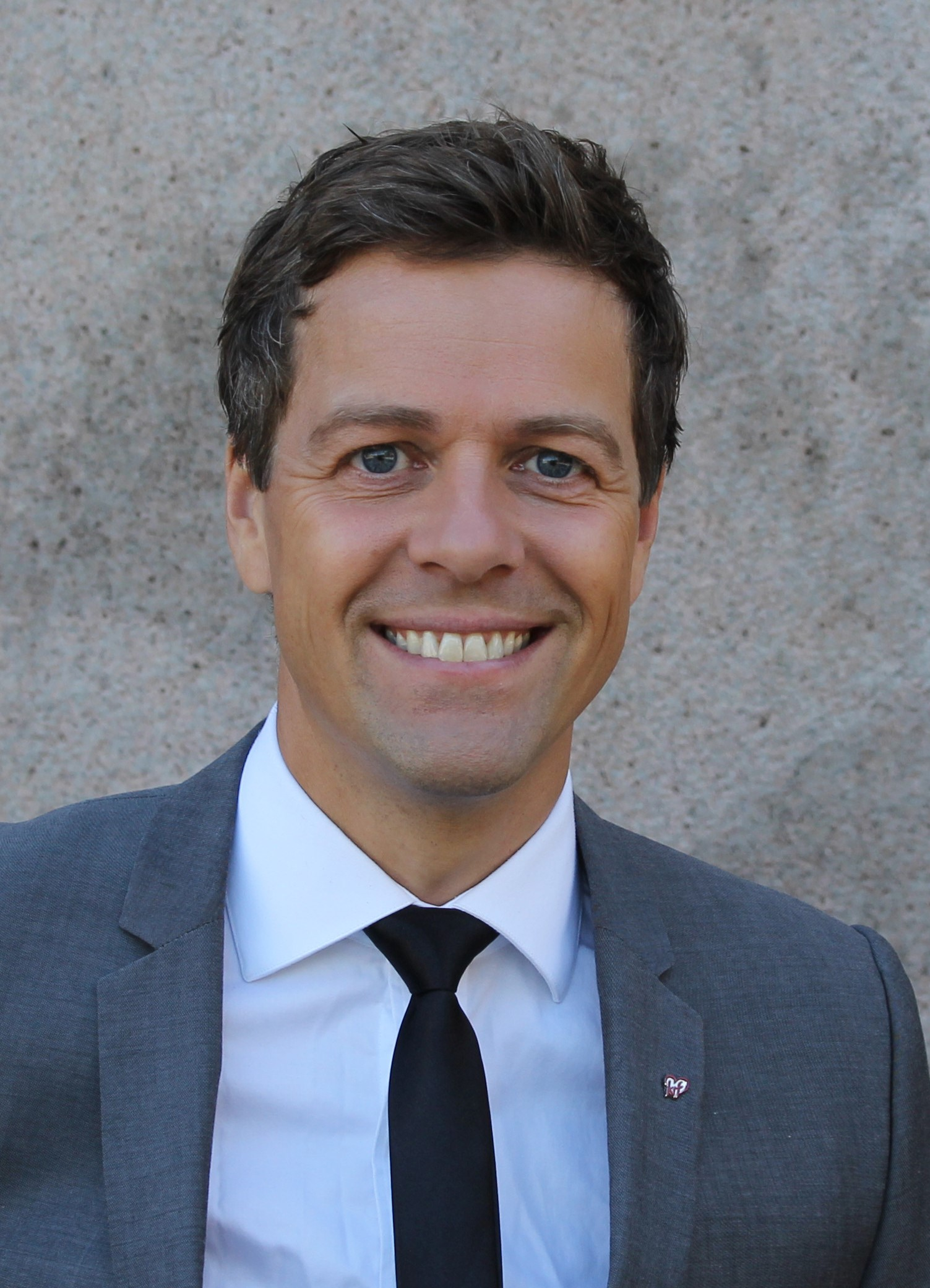

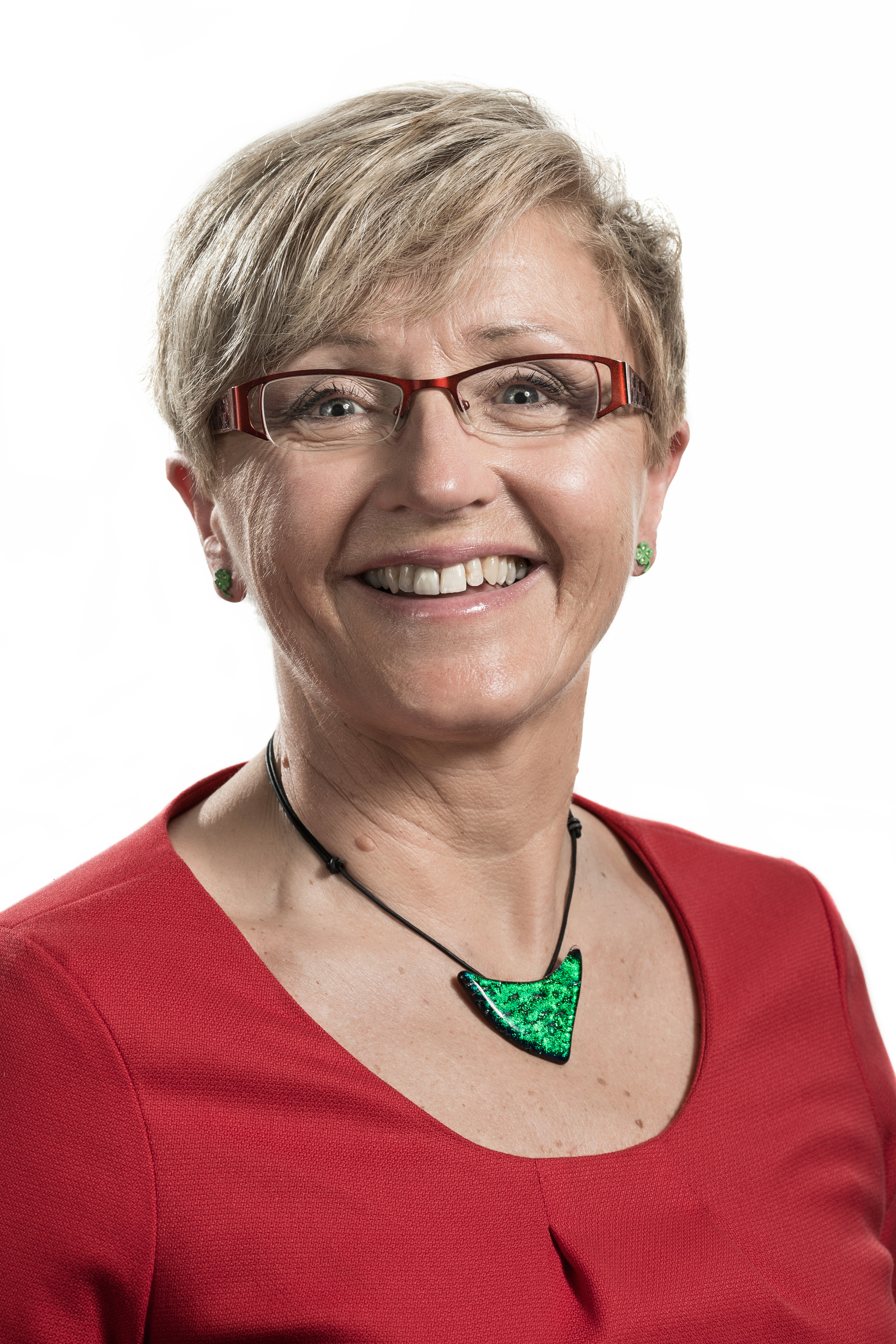

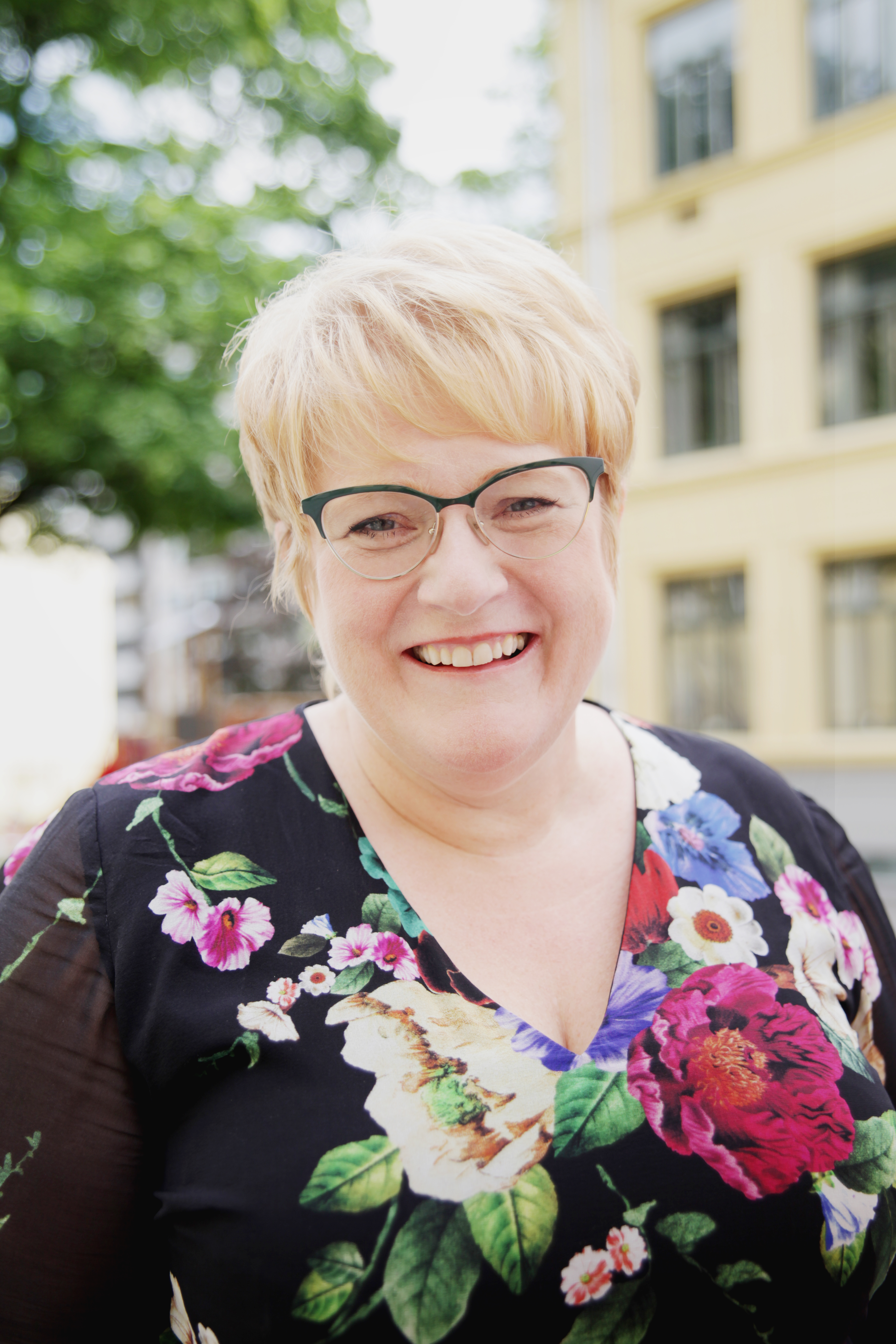

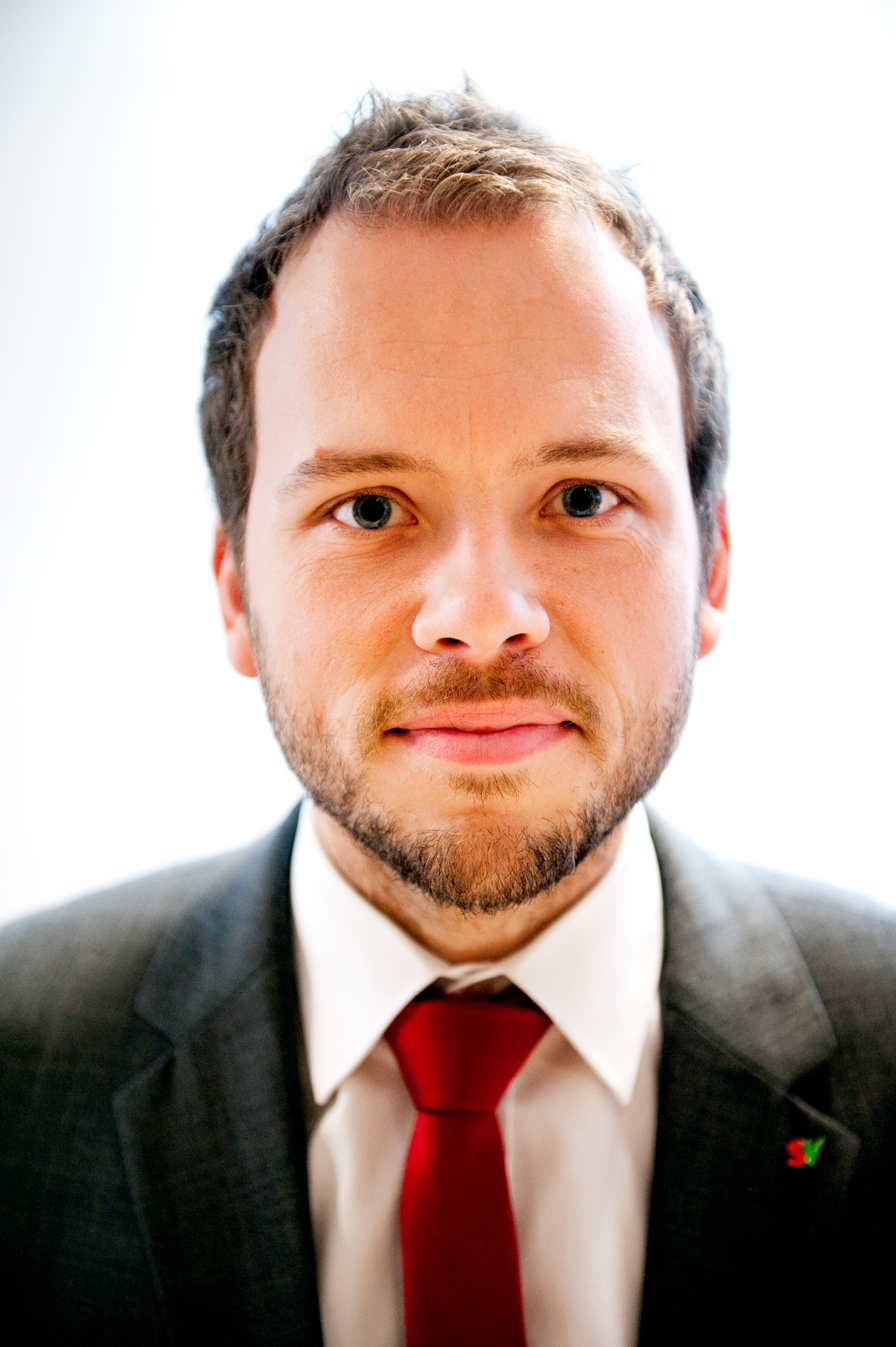

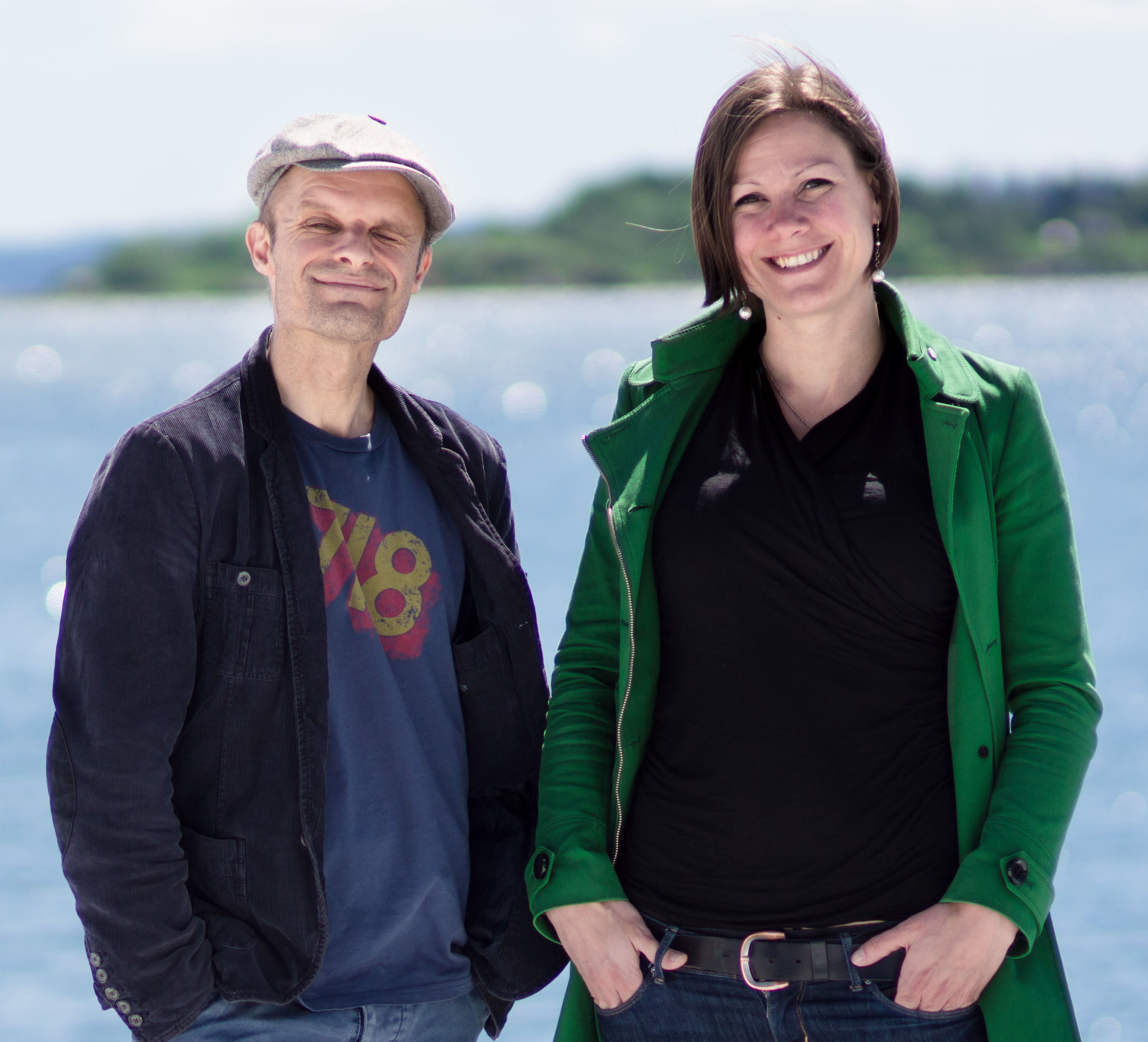
	First party	Second party	Third party
Leader	Jens Stoltenberg	Erna Solberg	Siv Jensen
Party	Labour	Conservative	Progress
Last election	35.37%, 64 seats	17.24%, 30 seats	41 seats, 22.9%
Seats won	55	48	29
Seat change	▼9	▲18	▼12
Popular vote	874,769	760,232	463,560
Percentage	30.84%	26.81%	16.35%
Swing	▼4.53 pp	▲9.57 pp	▼6.56 pp
	Fourth party	Fifth party	Sixth party
Leader	Knut Arild Hareide	Liv Signe Navarsete	Trine Skei Grande
Party	Christian; Democratic	Centre	Liberal
Last election	5.54%, 10 seats	6.15%, 11 seats	3.88%, 2 seats
Seats won	10	10	9
Seat change	Steady	▼1	▲7
Popular vote	158,475	155,357	148,275
Percentage	5.59%	5.48%	5.23%
Swing	▲0.05 pp	▼0.67 pp	▲1.35 pp
	Seventh party	Eighth party
Leader	Audun Lysbakken	Hanna E. Marcussen; Harald August Nissen
Party	Socialist Left	Green
Last election	6.20%, 11 seats	0.35%, 0 seats
Seats won	7	1
Seat change	▼4	▲1
Popular vote	116,021	79,152
Percentage	4.09%	2.79%
Swing	▼2.11 pp	▲2.44 pp
- Largest bloc and seats won by constituency
Prime Minister before election
Jens Stoltenberg
Labour
Prime Minister after election
Erna Solberg
Conservative

Parliamentary elections were held in Norway on 8 and 9 September 2013 to elect all 169 members of the unicameral Storting. The centre-right coalition obtained 96 seats, while the incumbent red–green coalition government obtained 72 seats and the Green Party obtained one. The Labour Party won the largest share (30.8%) of the votes cast, with the Conservatives coming second (26.8%), after increasing its share by 9.6 percentage points.

Elections in Norway are held on a Monday in September, usually the second or third Monday, as determined by the king-in-council (i.e. the government). In 2013, the election was held on the second Monday. Each municipality was permitted to open some or all of its polling stations on the day before the nationwide election day. This option was exercised by 206 of the 428 municipalities. The main period for early voting was 12 August to 6 September; it was also possible to make an even earlier vote after 1 July by contacting the municipal government.

The election was the fourth for incumbent Prime Minister of Norway Jens Stoltenberg, whose party was previously defeated in the 2001 parliamentary election, but who won both the 2005 parliamentary election and the 2009 parliamentary election (though in the latter election, the opposition narrowly received more votes than the coalition) leading the red–green coalition. Had he been re-elected, Stoltenberg would have been the first prime minister in Norway to be elected for three consecutive terms.

The election ended with a victory for the four opposition right-of-center parties, which won a total of 96 seats out of 169 (85 needed for a majority). The biggest gain was by the Conservative Party, which took 26.8% of the vote, while the governing red–green coalition lost ground; following convention, Stoltenberg's government resigned and handed over power in October. The Labour Party, however, remained the largest party in parliament with 30.8% of the popular vote. The Progress Party also lost ground, but nevertheless became a participant in the new government.

Among the smaller parties, the centrist Liberal Party and Christian Democrats emerged holding the balance of power. Both had campaigned for a change in government. On 30 September the two parties announced that they would support a minority coalition of the Conservative and Progress parties, but they would not participate in the cabinet themselves. The two smaller members of the red–green coalition both lost ground. The Centre Party lost only one seat and maintained a sizable parliamentary delegation, while the Socialist Left Party only narrowly reached the election threshold of 4%. The Green Party, which had not declared support for either bloc, received its first ever member of parliament with a single seat from Oslo.

== Electoral system ==
The election used party-list proportional representation in nineteen multi-member constituencies, one for each of the counties of Norway.

The number of members to be returned from each constituency varies between 4 and 19. To determine the apportionment of the 169 seats amongst the 19 counties, a two-tier formula is used, based on population and geographic size. Each inhabitant counts one point, while each square kilometer counts 1.8 points.

150 of the seats are regular district seats. These are awarded based on the election results in each county, and are unaffected by results in other counties. Nineteen of the seats (one for each county) are leveling seats which are given to parties that win fewer seats than their share of the national popular vote entitles them to. A party must win 4% of the popular vote in order to win compensation seats, but may still win district seats even if it fails to reach this threshold. The system for apportioning seats is biased in favour of rural areas since the area of the county is a factor, but the system of compensation seats reduces the effect this has on final party strength.

The total number of seats in the parliament remained unchanged at 169, but population changes meant that some counties gained or lost seats. Hedmark, Sogn og Fjordane, Nord-Trøndelag, Nordland and Troms all lost one seat each. Akershus, Hordaland and Rogaland gained one each, whilst Oslo gained two.

Seats by constituency
Constituency	Population	Area (km^{2})	Seats	Change since 2009
Østfold	278,352	4,182	9	Steady
Akershus	556,254	4,918	17	▲1
Oslo	613,285	454	19	▲2
Hedmark	192,791	27,398	7	▼1
Oppland	187,147	25,192	7	Steady
Buskerud	265,164	14,911	9	Steady
Vestfold	236,424	2,224	7	Steady
Telemark	170,023	15,298	6	Steady
Aust-Agder	111,495	9,157	4	Steady
Vest-Agder	174,324	7,277	6	Steady
Rogaland	443,115	9,376	14	▲1
Hordaland	490,570	15,440	16	▲1
Sogn og Fjordane	108,201	18,623	4	▼1
Møre og Romsdal	256,628	15,115	9	Steady
Sør-Trøndelag	297,950	18,856	10	Steady
Nord-Trøndelag	133,390	22,415	5	▼1
Nordland	238,320	38,462	9	▼1
Troms	158,650	25,870	6	▼1
Finnmark	73,787	48,617	5	Steady

== Contesting parties ==
=== Parliamentary parties ===
- Labour Party (Arbeiderpartiet), leader: Jens Stoltenberg. The Labour Party was the largest party in the 2009–2013 Storting, and the majority party in Stoltenberg's Second Cabinet. They got 35.4% of the votes and won 64 seats in the 2009 election. The party is primarily social democratic.
- Progress Party (Fremskrittspartiet), leader: Siv Jensen. The Progress Party was the largest opposition party in the 2009–2013 Storting, but have been the third-largest party in most public opinion polls of early 2013. The party is primarily right-libertarian.
- Conservative Party (Høyre), leader: Erna Solberg. The Conservative Party was the second-largest opposition party in the 2009–2013 Storting, with 17.2% of the votes in the last elections. However, the party has been the largest opposition party in most of the public opinion polls in early 2013.
- Socialist Left Party (Sosialistisk Vensterparti), leader: Audun Lysbakken. The Socialist Left Party was the second-largest government party. It is a democratic socialist party.
- Centre Party (Senterpartiet), leader: Liv Signe Navarsete. The Centre Party was the third-largest party in the current government. It is agrarian, staunchly eurosceptic and serves the interests of farmers and people in rural areas.
- Christian Democratic Party (Kristelig Folkeparti), leader: Knut Arild Hareide. The Christian Democratic Party was represented with 10 members of the 2009–2013 Storting.
- Liberal Party (Venstre), leader: Trine Skei Grande. The Liberal Party is a centrist and liberal party. They earned 3.9% of the votes in the 2009 elections, and thus they were only represented with 2 seats in parliament, due to their failure at passing the electoral threshold of 4% on a nationwide scale.
- Green Party (Miljøpartiet de Grønne), leader: Hanna Marcussen, Harald A. Nissen. The Greens experienced what has been described as a breakthrough in the 2011 Norwegian local elections. In this election the Greens won their first parliamentary seat.

=== Extra-parliamentary parties ===
- Red Party (Rødt), leader: Bjørnar Moxnes. The Red Party is a communist political party on the far-left. With 1.3% of the votes, the party failed to get any parliamentary seats in the 2009 general election.
- Pensioners' Party (Pensjonistpartiet), leader: Einar Lonstad. Following the last legislative election in Norway, the Pensioners' Party became the 9th largest party, with 0.4% of the votes. The party's primary aim is to promote the interests of pensioners and elderly people. It ran in only 12 counties.
- Christian Unity Party (Kristent Samlingsparti), leader: Morten Selven. The party is a Christian ultra-conservative party. Running in only 12 counties, it received 0.2% of the votes in the 2009 election.
- The Christians (De Kristne), leader: Erik Selle. The party, founded in 2011 in Bømlo Municipality, participated in the local elections in Bømlo and received 6.5% of the votes and two representatives in the local council. The party is founded on Christian conservative values, and is considered to lie between the Christian Democratic and the Christian Unity parties on the political spectrum. It ran in all counties.
- The Democrats (Demokratene i Norge), leader: Elisabeth Rue Strencbo. A nationalist and populist party, it received 0.1% of the votes in the 2009 election. It ran in all counties.
- Liberal People's Party (Det Liberale Folkeparti), leader: Vegard Martinsen. The party is libertarian, and advocates minimal government. It received below 0.1% of the votes in the 2009 election, and ran in only six counties.
- Coastal Party (Kystpartiet), leader: Bengt Stabrun Johansen. A national conservative party, known for defending the rights of fishermen and whalers in northern Norway. It received only 0.2% of the vote in the 2009 elections, but in 2001 won as much as 10% in Nordland county, where it secured a single seat in the national parliament, held by the well-known whaling activist Steinar Bastesen. The party ran in all counties.
- Pirate Party (Piratpartiet), leader: Øystein Jakobsen. Founded on the basis of the better-known international Pirate Parties in late 2012, its main cause is transparency in government. This was the party's first election. It ran in all counties.
- Communist Party (Norges Kommunistiske Parti), leader: Svend Haakon Jacobsen. The Marxist–Leninist party is one of the oldest in Norway, dating back to 1923. It received under 0.1% of the votes in the 2009 election. It ran in seven counties.
- People's List Against Oil Drilling in Lofoten, Vesterålen and Senja (Folkeliste mot oljeboring i Lofoten, Vesterålen og Senja), first candidate: Øystein Meier Johannessen. A single-issue party against oil drilling in the Lofoten, Vesterålen and Senja, an issue of great debate in Norway. This was the first election for the party, which ran a single candidate in Nordland.
- People's Power (Folkemakten), leader: Siv Gørbitz. The party was founded in 2012, and advocates direct democracy. It fielded a single candidate in Hordaland.
- Society Party (Samfunnspartiet), leader: Øystein Meier Johannessen. An anarchist party. It received below 0.1% of the votes in the 2009 election. It only ran in four counties.
- A Hospital for Alta (Sykehus til Alta). First participation by this single-issue party which advocated the building of a new and modern hospital in Alta and ran only in Finnmark.

== Leadership changes ==
=== Liberal Party ===
Lars Sponheim, who had been leader of the Liberal Party since 1996, stepped down in 2010. Trine Skei Grande was elected new leader on 18 March 2010.

=== Christian Democratic Party ===
Dagfinn Høybråten, who had been leader of the Christian Democratic Party since 2004, stepped down on 30 April 2011. Knut Arild Hareide was elected leader on the same day.

=== Socialist Left Party ===
Kristin Halvorsen, who had been leader of the Socialist Left Party since 1997, stepped down in early 2012. Audun Lysbakken was elected as the new leader of the party on 11 March 2012.

=== Red Party ===
Turid Thomassen, who had been leader of the Red Party since 2010, stepped down in early 2012. Bjørnar Moxnes was elected as the new leader on May 6, 2012.

== Campaign ==
Going into the campaign, the governing red–green coalition were far behind in the polls. Several polls had also shown that a "blue-blue" coalition of the Conservative and Progress parties might gain a majority.

The Labour Party continued to criticize the non-socialist opposition for being unable to propose a coalition that was endorsed by all parties. The Conservative Party desired a four-party coalition of all the opposition parties. The Liberal Party and Christian Democrats wanted a coalition with the Conservatives, while the Progress Party declared that they would not support a government they were not participating in. The opposition parties criticized the sitting government for health care queues and not making more use of private providers, for failure to invest in infrastructure, and for high tax rates.

The Green Party had never been in parliament before, but performed strongly in several polls, some even showing them above the threshold which would give them a sizable delegation in parliament. The Greens did not declare support for either the red–green or non-socialist blocs, but the Conservative Party considered the Greens to be well on the left side of the political spectrum. As their showings in polling rose, they began to face criticism for highly radical proposals. Nonetheless, the environmentally oriented Liberal and Socialist Left parties expressed worry that the Greens could become a spoiler by taking votes from them.

The Conservative Party's image branding of its leader Erna Solberg tried to take a softer tone after she had been dubbed in the media as "Iron Erna" when she tightened immigration rules as local government minister about a decade ago. Instead, their election website had shown her with pictures of hearts and of her smiling. The party's campaign issues included for secure jobs, healthcare, education and better roads. It also campaigned for abolishing the inheritance tax, means-testing for welfare recipients, tax incentives for private savings, simplifying procurement rules to make it easier for smaller businesses to offer for government tenders and the deregulation of alcohol sales.

The 2011 Norway attacks were not a central issue of the campaign. All the main parties had strongly condemned both the attacks and the political ideology of the perpetrator. When Stoltenberg accused the Conservatives of poor leadership skills for failing to offer a united alternative to the red–green coalition, Solberg retorted by pointing out that the Gjørv Report had cited poor leadership prior to the attacks. The retort provoked a negative reaction and was described as legitimate but unwise by the political commentator Frank Aarebrot. 33 survivors of the attacks ran for parliament on a Labour ticket, with four being elected, but their status as survivors was not a campaign issue. The Progress Party focused less on this issue and more on healthcare and infrastructure.

=== Slogans ===
Party	Original slogan	English translation
Labour Party	"Alle skal med" og "Vi tar Norge videre"	«Everyone must be included» and «We bring Norway forward»
Progress Party		
Conservative Party		
Socialist Left Party		
Centre Party		
Christian Democratic Party		
Liberal Party		
Red Electoral Alliance		

=== Donations ===
According to Statistisk sentralbyrå, a total of 40.45 million NOK in campaign contributions was raised by all political parties in 2013.

Party	Donations (NOK)
Labour Party	12,125,000
Conservative Party	11,160,400
Socialist Left Party	5,121,346
Centre Party	3,727,417
Progress Party	3,650,000
Green Party	2,586,345
Liberal Party	1,511,000
Red Party	470,778
Christian Democratic Party	100,000

=== Debates ===
2013 Norwegian general election debates
Date	Time	Organizers	P Present I Invitee N Non-invitee									
Date	Time	Organizers	Ap	H	Frp	KrF	Sp	V	Sv	R	MdG	Refs
12 August	21:30	NRK	P Jens Stoltenberg	P Erna Solberg	P Siv Jensen	P Knut Arild Hareide	P Liv Signe Navarsete	P Trine Skei Grande	P Audun Lysbakken	N Bjørnar Moxnes	N Hanna Marcussen	
6 Sep	00:00	NRK	P Jens Stoltenberg	P Erna Solberg	P Siv Jensen	P Knut Arild Hareide	P Liv Signe Navarsete	P Trine Skei Grande	P Audun Lysbakken	P Bjørnar Moxnes	P Hanna Marcussen	

== Opinion polls ==
In the run up to the election, various organizations conducted opinion polls to gauge voting intentions. Below is a month by month average of all opinion polls.

For the smaller parties, the election threshold of 4% became a threat. Several opinion polls showed the Socialist Left Party below the threshold, and on August 18 the party called a press conference declaring that the future of a political force left of Labour was at stake. In the lead-up to the election, opinion polls consistently predicted a victory for the Conservative-led coalition.

Polling period	Centre-left coalition			Centre-right coalition				Other	Ap+Sp+SV	H+FrP+KrF+V	Lead
Polling period	Ap	Sp	SV	H	FrP	KrF	V	Other	Ap+Sp+SV	H+FrP+KrF+V	Lead
September 2013	29.4%	5.1%	5.0%	27.0%	16.0%	6.1%	5.5%	6.0%	39.5%	54.6%	+15.1
August 2013	29.0%	5.3%	4.3%	28.9%	15.2%	5.4%	5.3%	6.5%	38.6%	54.8%	+16.2
July 2013	28.0%	4.6%	3.9%	31.6%	16.2%	5.2%	5.2%	5.5%	36.5%	58.2%	+21.7
June 2013	28.6%	4.5%	4.3%	32.0%	16.4%	5.3%	4.2%	4.6%	37.4%	57.9%	+20.5
May 2013	28.9%	4.5%	4.7%	31.8%	16.0%	5.3%	4.7%	4.2%	38.1%	57.8%	+19.7
April 2013	27.7%	4.8%	5.0%	32.6%	16.5%	5.1%	4.5%	3.8%	37.5%	58.7%	+21.2
March 2013	28.1%	4.8%	4.4%	32.4%	16.8%	4.7%	5.2%	3.5%	37.3%	59.1%	+21.8
February 2013	28.4%	4.7%	4.9%	32.9%	15.6%	5.3%	4.5%	3.6%	38.0%	58.3%	+20.3
January 2013	28.6%	4.4%	4.1%	33.6%	15.9%	5.5%	4.4%	3.2%	37.1%	59.4%	+22.3
December 2012	28.6%	4.7%	4.3%	32.0%	16.2%	5.3%	5.2%	3.5%	37.6%	58.7%	+21.1
November 2012	29.6%	4.5%	4.4%	31.4%	17.0%	5.0%	4.9%	3.0%	38.5%	58.3%	+19.8
October 2012	27.8%	4.4%	4.1%	33.9%	17.2%	5.0%	4.5%	3.2%	36.3%	60.6%	+24.3
September 2012	29.2%	4.3%	3.9%	33.5%	16.6%	5.2%	3.9%	3.4%	37.4%	59.2%	+21.8
August 2012	30.2%	4.4%	4.0%	31.6%	17.3%	4.6%	4.7%	3.3%	38.6%	58.2%	+19.6
July 2012	29.8%	4.8%	3.9%	30.5%	18.4%	5.0%	4.4%	2.9%	38.5%	58.3%	+19.8
June 2012	29.9%	4.7%	4.3%	32.0%	16.2%	4.7%	4.8%	3.4%	38.9%	57.7%	+18.8
May 2012	30.8%	4.6%	4.2%	30.9%	16.0%	5.1%	4.7%	3.6%	39.6%	56.7%	+17.1
April 2012	30.5%	5.1%	4.5%	29.4%	17.3%	5.1%	5.2%	3.0%	40.1%	57.2%	+17.1
March 2012	32.9%	5.3%	4.5%	27.9%	16.3%	5.4%	4.6%	3.1%	42.7%	54.2%	+11.5
February 2012	34.4%	5.1%	4.8%	27.9%	14.4%	5.1%	5.3%	2.9%	44.3%	52.5%	+8.2
January 2012	34.7%	5.0%	4.1%	29.3%	13.7%	5.3%	4.9%	3.0%	43.8%	53.2%	+9.4
Previous election 14 September 2009	35.4%	6.2%	6.2%	17.2%	22.9%	5.5%	3.9%	2.5%	47.8%	49.5%	+1.7

=== Seat predictions ===
The total number of seats in the parliament will remain 169, but due to changes in the population, some counties will gain or lose seats. Hedmark, Sogn og Fjordane, Nord-Trøndelag, Nordland and Troms all lose one seat each. Akershus, Hordaland and Rogaland gain one each, whilst Oslo gains two.

Polling period	Government			Opposition				Ap+Sp+SV	H+FrP+KrF+V	Lead
Polling period	Ap	Sp	SV	H	FrP	KrF	V	Ap+Sp+SV	H+FrP+KrF+V	Lead
September 2013	54	9	9	46	30	10	9	72	95	+23
August 2013	51	9	8	53	27	10	9	68	99	+31
July 2013	52	8	1	58	30	9	10	61	107	+46
June 2013	52	7	7	57	30	8	7	66	102	+36
May 2013	51	7	8	57	30	8	7	66	102	+36
April 2013	50	8	8	56	30	8	8	66	102	+36
March 2013	51	8	7	57	30	7	8	66	102	+36
February 2013	51	8	8	57	28	9	7	67	102	+35
January 2013	54	7	7	57	28	10	7	68	101	+33
December 2012	51	8	7	55	30	9	8	66	102	+36
November 2012	52	8	7	54	31	8	8	67	101	+34
October 2012	52	7	7	57	31	8	7	66	103	+37
September 2012	54	8	1	61	31	10	3	63	105	+42
August 2012	54	8	1	57	32	8	8	63	105	+42
July 2012	54	9	1	55	33	9	8	64	105	+41
June 2012	55	7	7	55	28	8	8	69	99	+30
May 2012	55	8	7	54	28	8	8	70	98	+28
April 2012	53	9	7	49	33	8	9	69	99	+30
March 2012	59	9	7	47	30	9	8	75	94	+19
February 2012	64	8	8	46	25	9	9	80	89	+9
January 2012	62	9	7	50	23	9	8	78	90	+12
Previous election 14 September 2009	64	11	11	30	41	10	2	86	83	+3

== Results ==
The voting centres closed at 19:00 GMT and the publication of exit polls followed.

Party	Votes	%	Seats	+/–
Labour Party	874,769	30.84	55	−9
Conservative Party	760,232	26.81	48	+18
Progress Party	463,560	16.35	29	−12
Christian Democratic Party	158,475	5.59	10	0
Centre Party	155,357	5.48	10	−1
Liberal Party	148,275	5.23	9	+7
Socialist Left Party	116,021	4.09	7	−4
Green Party	79,152	2.79	1	+1
Red Party	30,751	1.08	0	0
The Christians	17,731	0.63	0	New
Pensioners' Party	11,865	0.42	0	0
Pirate Party	9,869	0.35	0	New
Coastal Party	3,311	0.12	0	0
Democrats in Norway	2,214	0.08	0	0
Christian Unity Party	1,722	0.06	0	0
Liberal People's Party	909	0.03	0	0
Communist Party	611	0.02	0	0
Hospital to Alta	467	0.02	0	New
Society Party	295	0.01	0	0
LoVeSe	268	0.01	0	New
People's Power	175	0.01	0	New
Total	2,836,029	100.00	169	0
Valid votes	2,836,029	99.43		
Invalid/blank votes	16,129	0.57		
Total votes	2,852,158	100.00		
Registered voters/turnout	3,641,753	78.32		
Source: KRD

=== Voter demographics ===
Cohort	Percentage of cohort voting for								
Cohort	Ap	H	FrP	KrF	Sp	V	Sv	MDG	Others
Total vote	30.84%	26.81%	16.35%	5.59%	5.48%	5.23%	4.09%	2.79%	
Gender
Females	35.2%	24.3%	12.2%	7%	5%	5.6%	5.6%	2.8%	
Males	26.7%	29.2%	20.4%	4.2%	5.9%	4.9%	2.8%	2.8%	
Age
18–30 years old	24.9%	21.5%	19.7%	4.3%	3.9%	7.3%	6.4%	6.4%	
30-59 years old	32.8%	29.7%	14%	5.1%	5.1%	5.3%	4%	2.2%	
60 years old and older	30.5%	24.2%	18.6%	7.6%	7.3%	3.8%	3%	1.8%	
Work
low income	33.7%	20.8%	18.8%	5%	5.9%	4.4%	3.5%	4.1%	
Average income	32.6%	24.6%	17.7%	5.1%	5.7%	4.8%	4%	3.6%	
High income	29.1%	34.1%	12.2%	5.4%	5%	5.9%	4.7%	1.1%	
Education
Primary school	33.3%	20.5%	23.9%	4.3%	6%	2.6%	3.4%	1.7%	
High school	31.2%	26.1%	20.3%	5.9%	7.1%	2.8%	2.2%	2.3%	
University/college	29.8%	28.8%	10.9%	5.5%	3.8%	8.2%	6.1%	3.5%	
Source: Norwegian Institute for Social Research

=== Seat distribution ===
Constituency	Total seats	Seats won										
Constituency	Total seats	By party								By coalition		
Constituency	Total seats	Ap	H	FrP	KrF	Sp	V	SV	MdG	Red-Greens	Borgerlig	Others
Akershus	17	5	7	3			1	1		6	11	
Aust-Agder	4	1	1	1	1					1	3	
Buskerud	9	3	3	2		1	1			4	6	
Finnmark	5	2	1	1				1		3	2	
Hedmark	7	3	1	1		1		1		5	2	
Hordaland	16	4	6	2	1	1	1	1		6	10	
Møre og Romsdal	9	2	2	2	1	1	1			3	6	
Nord-Trøndelag	5	2	1			1	1			3	2	
Nordland	9	4	2	2		1				5	4	
Oppland	7	3	1	1		1	1			4	3	
Oslo	19	6	6	2	1		2	1	1	7	11	1
Østfold	9	3	3	2	1					3	6	
Rogaland	14	3	4	3	2	1	1			4	10	
Sogn og Fjordane	4	1	1			1	1			2	2	
Sør-Trøndelag	10	4	2	2		1		1		6	4	
Telemark	6	3	1	1	1					3	3	
Troms	6	2	2	1				1		3	3	
Vest-Agder	6	2	2	1	1					2	4	
Vestfold	7	2	2	2	1					2	5	
Total	169	55	48	29	10	10	9	7	1	72	97	1
Source: Election Authority

== Reactions ==
Conservative Party leader Erna Solberg said: "The voters had the choice between 12 years of red/green government or a new government with new ideas and new solutions". Labour Party leader Jens Stoltenberg has conceded defeat, saying that the party tried "to do what almost no one has done, to win three elections in a row, but it turned out to be tough". Progress Party leader Siv Jensen said: "We will ensure a solid footprint in a new government and if we are going to have good solutions, all four parties must have a place, all must be visible". Christian Democrat leader Knut Arild Hareide said: "The centre will play a key role. We and Trine Skei Grande (Liberal Party leader) have got a key role for the next four years. We are ready to put a new government in place".

Several commentators noted in half-jest that all the parties had won something from the election. The four parties on the right gained a majority and were as such the victors, but also, for the defeated red–green coalition, there was a silver lining. The Labour Party's numbers in the polls rose during the campaign and they retained their status as the largest party. The Socialist Left Party had a historically bad election, but they succeeded at climbing over the election threshold and retained seven seats, as compared with a mere two seats had they fallen under. The Centre Party did better than expected, and emerged from eight years in government with about the same amount of support as before. Meanwhile, the Green Party could celebrate their first ever member of parliament.

== Analysis ==
University of Bergen politics professor Frank Aarebrot said of the election campaign that it was dominated by classical welfare issues such as better care for the elderly, improved hospitals and better schools. At the same time, he pointed out that no party called for Norwegians to pay privately for such things as hospital visits, college education or elderly care.

== Government formation ==
The Conservative Party was said to be looking for coalition talks with the Progress Party, Liberal Party and the Christian Democrats. Solberg said that while staying committed to cutting taxes, reducing the size of government and improving health care, she acknowledged a need to make policy concessions. "We will all have to give and take to get a policy stance that has a firm direction and will last over time. All three (other parties) will be tough negotiators in issues close to their hearts". Four-party talks involved the Conservatives, Progress Party (FrP), Christian Democrats (KrF) and Liberals. FrP demanded Siv Jensen become the new finance minister.

On 30 September the four parties on the right announced that they had reached an agreement for a minority cabinet consisting of the Conservative and Progress parties with confidence and supply from the Liberal and Christian Democratic parties.
