= 2011 Norwegian local elections =

Municipality and county elections in Norway

Nationwide local elections for seats in municipality and county councils were held throughout Norway on 12 September 2011. Several municipalities also opened the polling booths on 11 September. For polling stations this meant that two elections, the municipal elections and the county elections ran concurrently. In addition, an advisory referendum was held in Aust-Agder to determine whether to merge the county with Vest-Agder.

Overall, the Conservative Party made the greatest gains, and the Labour Party also advanced and remained the largest party. On the other hand, the Progress Party and the Socialist Left Party suffered severe setbacks.

Term of office was 1 January 2012 until 31 December 2015.

== New features ==
=== Electronic voting ===
Electronic voting over the internet was tried out in certain areas for the first time in Norway, with the ultimate goal of implementing full general availability for internet voting for the 2017 parliamentary elections.

=== Voting age of 16 ===
In 2008, Magnhild Meltveit Kleppa, the Minister of Local Government and Regional Development announced that she was considering lowering the voting age from 18 to 16 in some municipalities as a trial. Three municipalities had applied for this in the 2007 election, but were turned down.

Parliament decided to give adolescents of age 16 and 17 the right to vote in selected municipalities. Of 143 applicants, 20 municipalities plus Longyearbyen on Svalbard were selected for the trial. The municipalities taking part in the trial are:

1. Marker Municipality in Østfold
2. Lørenskog Municipality in Akershus
3. Hamar Municipality in Hedmark
4. Vågå Municipality in Oppland
5. Sigdal Municipality in Buskerud
6. Re Municipality in Vestfold
7. Porsgrunn Municipality in Telemark
8. Grimstad Municipality in Aust-Agder
9. Mandal Municipality in Vest-Agder
10. Gjesdal Municipality in Rogaland
11. Stavanger Municipality in Rogaland
12. Austevoll Municipality in Hordaland
13. Luster Municipality in Sogn og Fjordane
14. Ålesund Municipality in Møre og Romsdal
15. Osen Municipality in Sør-Trøndelag
16. Namdalseid Municipality in Nord-Trøndelag
17. Tysfjord Municipality in Nordland
18. Kåfjord Municipality in Troms
19. Hammerfest Municipality in Finnmark
20. Kautokeino Municipality in Finnmark

== Election campaign ==
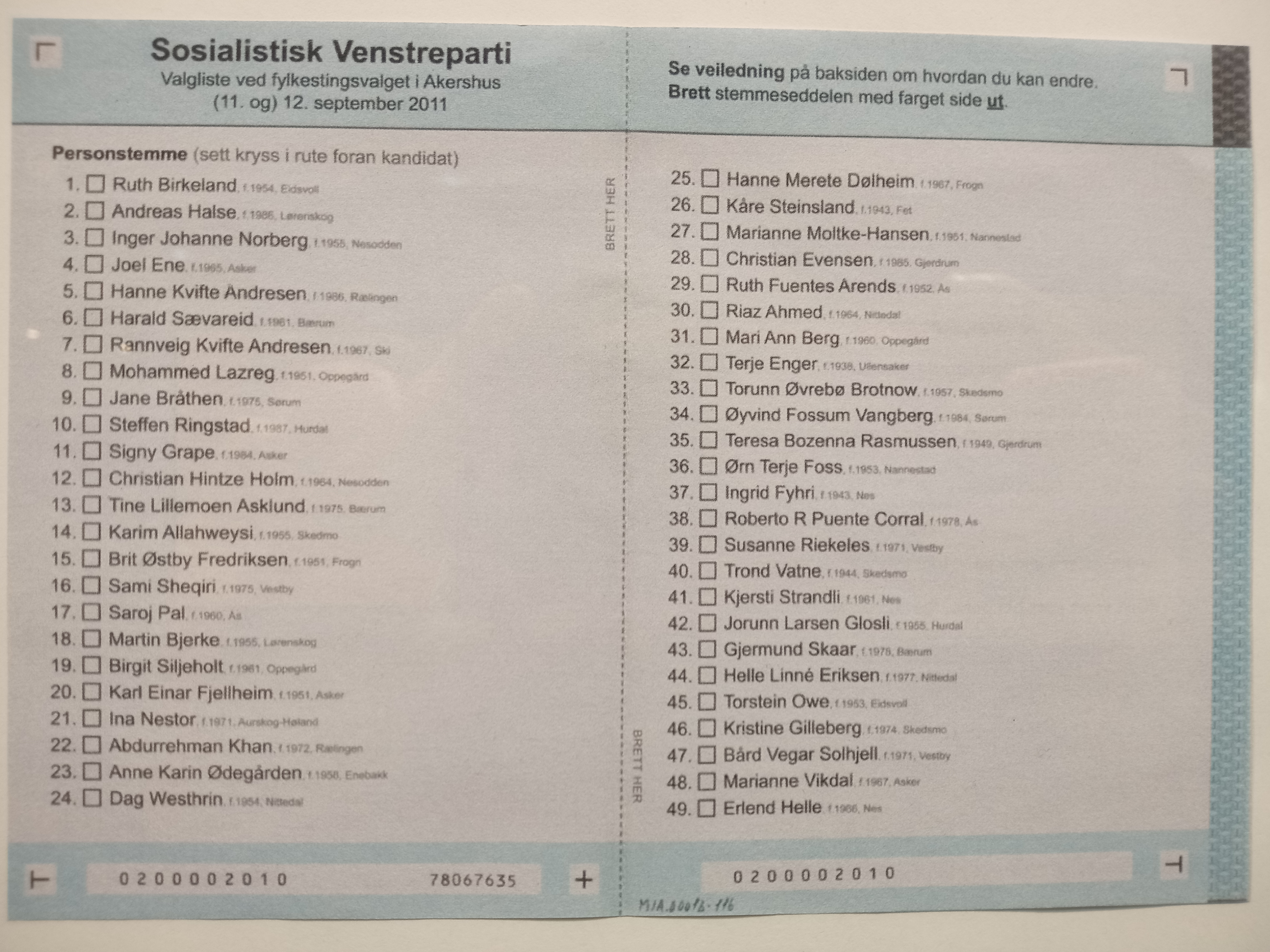
Example of ballot paper (Socialist Left Party)

The issue of how and when the campaign would be conducted was affected by the 2011 Norway attacks on 22 July, which killed 77 people, most of them young supporters of the national Labour Party. On 24 July, the prime minister, the president of the Storting, and the parliamentary leaders of the political parties met for the first time to discuss rules for the political debates which would take place. Liv Signe Navarsete predicted that the election campaign would be considerably muted. On 25 July, the parliamentary leaders of the political parties agreed to delay the start of the campaign until mid-August and to cancel the school debates, because of the 22 July attacks. The school elections were, however, not cancelled.

=== Issues ===
One of the bigger issues for the local elections was a controversy about local hospitals in Møre og Romsdal, involving the cities Molde and Kristiansund which has hospitals today. The current Red-Green government postponed the planned building of a new hospital in Molde, instead considering moving vital functions to it from Kristiansund, the local population in Molde saw the postponement as a broken promise, while the locals in Kristiansund wanted a common hospital instead due to the latter issue. In early 2011, the Labour Party saw a shock opinion poll in Romsdal (which includes the city Molde) of a mere 5.8% support, which fell further in April to 1%. The handling of the controversy by the party, and particularly its Minister of Health and Care Services, Anne-Grete Strøm-Erichsen, was seen as the reason for the fall.

== Debates ==
2011 Norwegian local election debates
Date	Time	Organizers	P Present I Invitee N Non-invitee								
Date	Time	Organizers	Ap	Sp	H	Sv	KrF	Frp	V	Rv	Refs
9 Sep	???	NRK	P Jens Stoltenberg	P Liv Signe Navarsete	P Erna solberg	P Kristin Halvorsen	P Knut Arild Hareide	P Siv Jensen	P Trine Skei Grande	P Turid Thomassen	

== Polling ==
Polling Firm	Date	Source	Labour Party	Conservative Party	Progress Party	Centre Party	Christian Democratic Party	Socialist Left Party	Liberal Party	Others
Last Election	2007-09		29.6%	19.3%	17.5%	8.0%	6.4%	6.2%	5.9%	7.1%
TNS Gallup	2010-01		31.9%	25.0%	17.5%	6.4%	4.9%	6.1%	3.6%	4.6%
TNS Gallup	2010-07		25.9%	27.1%	20.0%	6.1%	4.5%	5.8%	4.9%	5.7%
Norfakta	2010-09		27.5%	27.4%	18.5%	5.8%	5.2%	5.3%	5.6%	4.7%
Norfakta	2011-01		22.5%	30.1%	17.5%	5.4%	4.9%	6.7%	6.3%	6.6%
TNS Gallup	2011-02		28.7%	27.4%	16.0%	7.7%	4.6%	5.3%	5.4%	2.7%
Response	2011-02		26.8%	25.4%	19.4%	7.0%	6.8%	5.4%	5.1%	4.1%
TNS Gallup	2011-03		26.8%	29.3%	16.1%	7.6%	5.1%	5.6%	5.6%	3.9%
Response	2011-03		28.4%	28.7%	17.0%	6.8%	4.7%	5.7%	5.4%	3.3%
Sentio	2011-03		28.9%	23.7%	17.7%	6.9%	6.1%	4.2%	6.0%	6.5%
TNS Gallup	2011-04		28.9%	27.0%	15.3%	6.4%	4.9%	6.5%	5.6%	5.4%
InFact	2011-04		28.5%	23.5%	18.9%	6.8%	5.0%	5.5%	5.8%	5.9%
Norstat	2011-05		30.6%	28.9%	13.6%	6.4%	4.6%	4.7%	5.5%	5.6%
TNS Gallup	2011-05		27.3%	28.1%	15.2%	6.6%	5.0%	6.5%	5.2%	6.0%
TNS Gallup	2011-06		27.0%	31.0%	13.2%	5.3%	6.9%	6.5%	4.9%	5.1%
InFact	2011-06		29.0%	26.8%	20.6%	5.1%	5.0%	6.0%	3.7%	3.8%
InFact	2011-07		24.9%	27.0%	16.9%	7.5%	5.7%	5.2%	6.1%	6.7%
TNS Gallup^{1}	2011-07		35.4%	23.3%	13.6%	6.2%	4.7%	6.0%	5.9%	4.9%
Norstat	2011-08		34.2%	25.2%	16.0%	5.6%	4.5%	3.6%	5.0%	6.0%
TNS Gallup	2011-08		33.8%	24.9%	12.7%	4.9%	6.0%	6.8%	6.2%	4.7%
InFact	2011-08		31.6%	24.5%	17.5%	5.8%	5.1%	4.7%	5.5%	5.2%
Synovate	2011-08		34.0%	26.0%	16.0%	4.9%	6.1%	4.7%	3.9%	4.5%
InFact	2011-08		32.4%	25.0%	12.9%	5.7%	7.2%	6.3%	5.3%	5.2%
TNS Gallup	2011-08		30.9%	25.0%	14.0%	6.5%	6.5%	4.0%	6.3%	6.8%
TNS Gallup	2011-09		31.3%	27.3%	12.8%	5.9%	6.0%	4.5%	6.9%	4.5%
Synovate	2011-09		31.0%	25.1%	15.3%	6.2%	7.0%	4.4%	6.1%	4.9%
TNS Gallup	2011-09		31.9%	27.9%	12.8%	6.0%	6.5%	4.1%	6.7%	4.1%
Response	2011-09		32.1%	25.9%	16.3%	5.6%	5.9%	3.7%	5.5%	5.0%
TNS Gallup	2011-09		34.3%	27.1%	11.3%	5.2%	6.2%	3.6%	5.7%	6.6%
TNS Gallup	2011-09		33.3%	26.2%	12.3%	5.4%	5.6%	4.2%	6.2%	6.8%

^{1}This was the first poll since the attacks in Norway.

== Results ==
=== Municipal elections ===
Party	Votes	%	Seats
Labour Party	765,289	31.66	3,373
Conservative Party	676,059	27.97	2,349
Progress Party	274,555	11.36	1,143
Centre Party	163,246	6.75	1,419
Liberal Party	151,406	6.26	640
Christian Democratic Party	134,653	5.57	656
Socialist Left Party	98,225	4.06	364
Red Party	37,241	1.54	57
Green Party	21,785	0.90	18
Pensioners' Party	19,851	0.82	50
Democrats in Norway	4,327	0.18	8
Coastal Party	4,070	0.17	41
Others	66,449	2.75	663
Total	2,417,156	100.00	10,781
Registered voters/turnout	3,799,742	–	
Source: Government of Norway, Norwegian Broadcasting Corporation, TV2

=== County elections ===
Party	Votes	%	Seats
Labour Party	745,087	33.19	273
Conservative Party	620,504	27.64	210
Progress Party	263,915	11.76	96
Centre Party	141,514	6.30	61
Christian Democratic Party	129,932	5.79	47
Liberal Party	127,226	5.67	46
Socialist Left Party	96,890	4.32	34
Red Party	38,723	1.73	7
Green Party	28,952	1.29	2
Pensioners' Party	20,840	0.93	3
Coastal Party	8,446	0.38	3
Democrats in Norway	6,033	0.27	1
Sunnmøre List	5,718	0.25	3
Christian Unity Party	4,829	0.22	0
Byluftslisten	1,436	0.06	0
Communist Party	1,282	0.06	0
Sámi People's Party	1,233	0.05	1
Vestfoldlisten mot bomringer	844	0.04	0
Society Democrats	799	0.04	0
Society Party	289	0.01	0
Liberal People's Party	247	0.01	0
Total	2,244,739	100.00	787
Registered voters/turnout	3,789,746	–	
Source: Government of Norway
