= Mari Eifring =

Norwegian politician (born 1987)

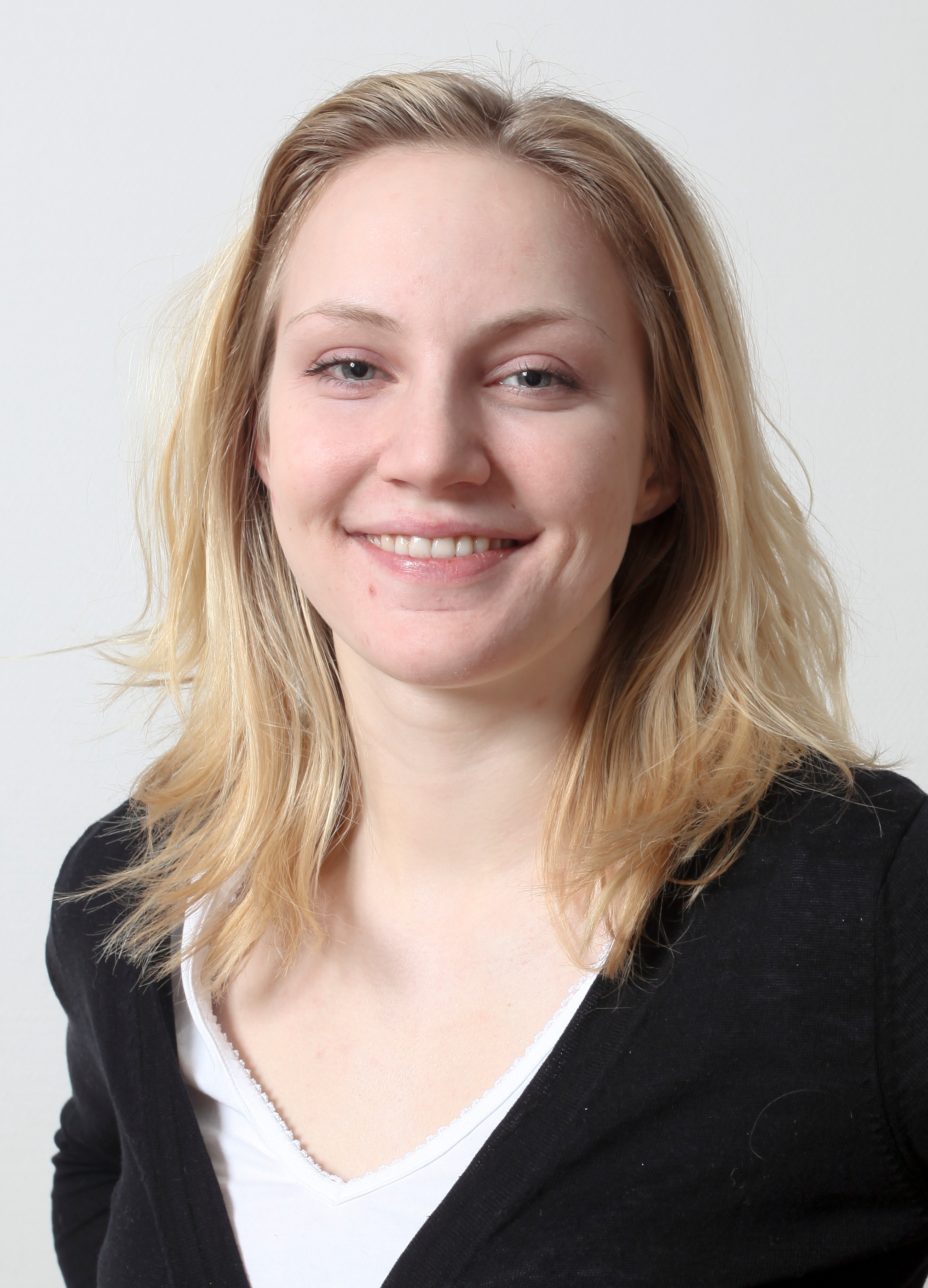

Leader of Red Youth
- In office 2008–2010
- Preceded by: Mimir Kristjansson
- Succeeded by: Iver Aastebøl

Personal details
- Born: 19 January 1987 (age 39) Oslo, Norway
- Party: Red

Mari Eifring (born 19 January 1987, in Oslo) is a Norwegian politician of the Red Party. In 2012 she was elected the party's secretary. She was the leader of Red Youth from 2008 until 2010. She had been a member of Red Youth's Central Board since 2006.

Party political offices
Preceded by Mimir Kristjansson	Leader of Red Youth; 2008–2010	Succeeded by Iver Aastebøl
Preceded by Beth Hartmann	Party secretary of Red; 2012–	Succeeded by
