= Ingrid Baltzersen =

Norwegian politician (born 1980)

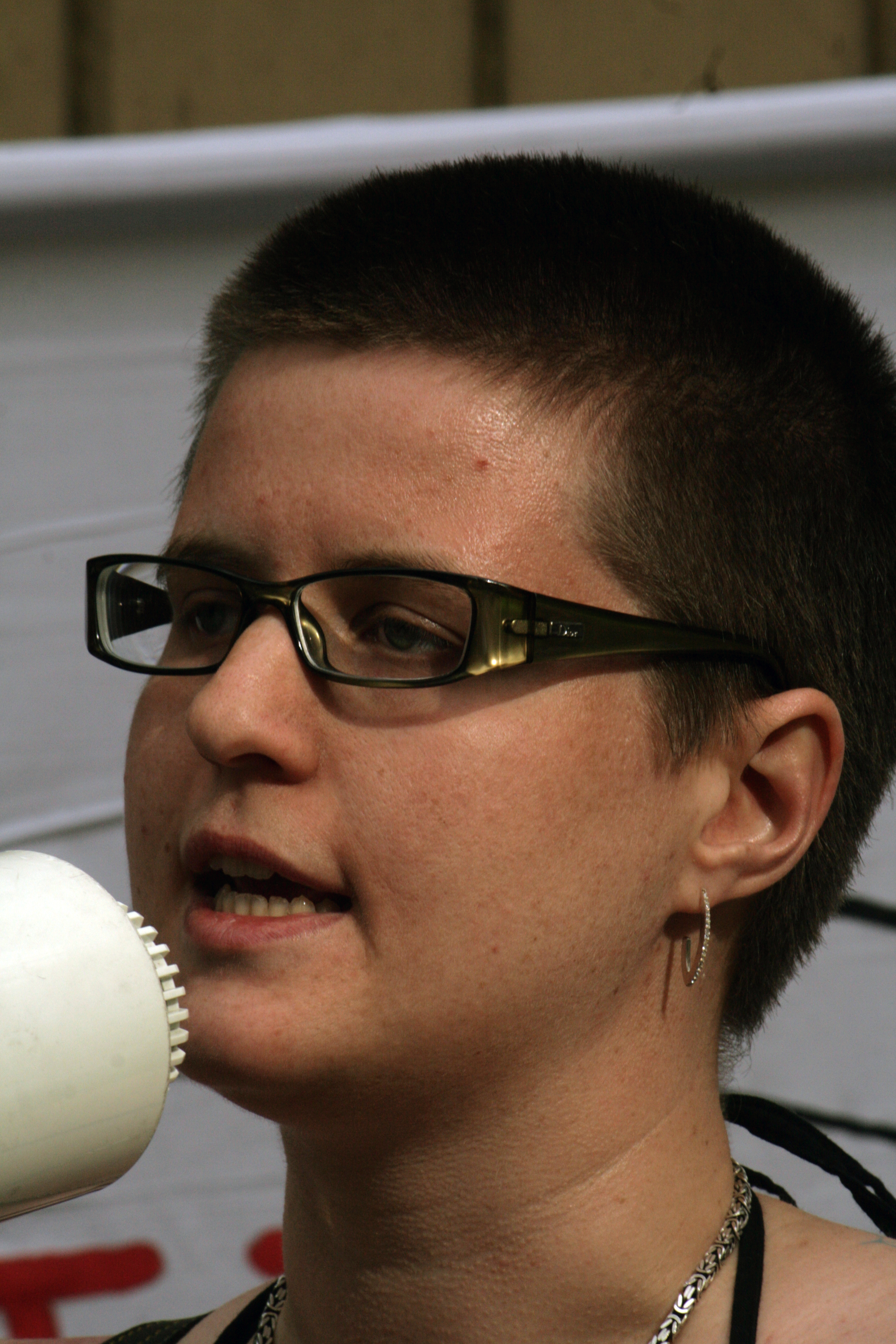
- Baltzersen in 2010

Deputy Leader of the Red Party
- In office 11 March 2007 – 30 May 2010 Serving with Ana Lopez Taylor
- Leader: Torstein Dahle
- Preceded by: Position established
- Succeeded by: Bjørnar Moxnes

Personal details
- Born: 16 October 1980 (age 45)
- Occupation: Tram driver Politician; Teacher at Øygardungdomskole

Ingrid Baltzersen (born 16 October 1980) is a Norwegian politician.

She chaired the Workers' Communist Party from 2006 to 2007. She was thus the last chairman of this party, and became vice chairman of the new Red Party.

She was elected to Oslo city council for the period 2007–2011.

== Biography ==
She received her Master's degree from the University of Oslo in 2008 about the Kefaya movement and the coalition's role in Egyptian society. Since then, Baltzersen has other articles in journals on Kefaya.

Outside of politics, she has been working as a tram driver.
