= Marhaug =

Origin
- Region of origin: Scandinavia

Marhaug is a surname of Scandinavian origin.

== List of persons with the surname ==
=== L ===
- Lasse Marhaug (born 1974), musician

=== S ===
- Sofie Marhaug (born 1990), politician
