= Ingeborg Steinholt =

Norwegian politician (born 1986)

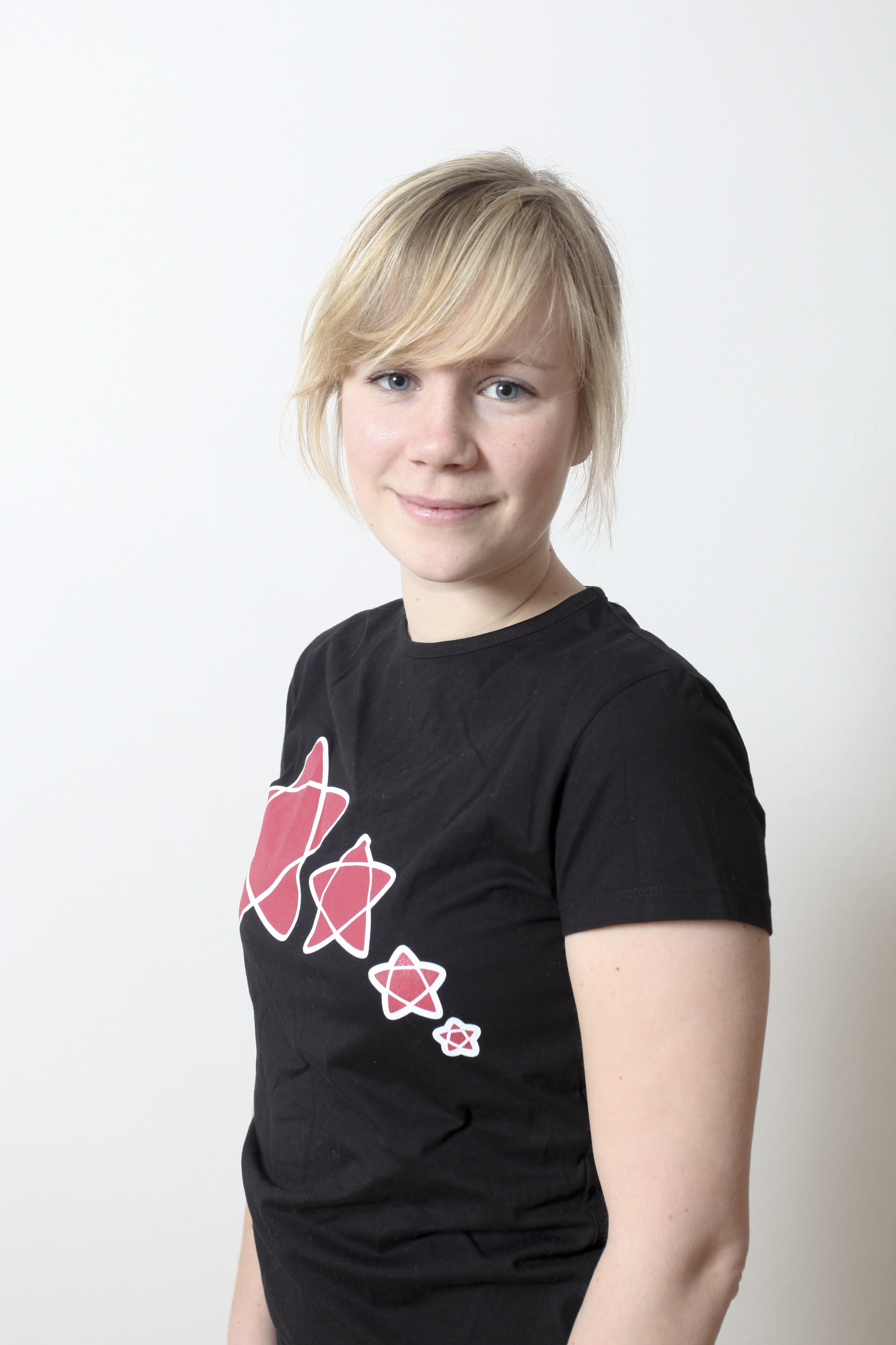
- Ingeborg Steinholt in 2009

Nordland County Council representative for Red
- In office 10 September 2007 – present

Personal details
- Born: 16 July 1986 (age 40) Sandnessjøen, Norway
- Party: Red/Red Youth
- Occupation: Assistant nurse
- Profession: Nursing student

Ingeborg Haug Steinholt (born 16 July 1986) is a Norwegian politician for the Red Party, and since 2007 a member of Nordland County Council. Steinholt was a member of the Central Committee of Red Youth (RU) from 2006 to 2010. She was also a member of the Central Board of Directors of Red Youth.

== Life and career ==
Steinholt was born in Sandnessjøen. She later moved to Oslo to study nursing, and works there as a nursing assistant. Steinholt has residences in Oslo and Sandnessjøen. She is currently studying medicine in Tromsø. She stands for a more liberal policy regarding vocational education, and wants to remove much unneeded theory in such subjects.

== Political career ==
Steinholt started her political career as a member of Red Youth, and later became a member of its mother party, Red. In 2007 Steinholt was elected as Red Nordland's leading candidate in the local elections of 2007. Steinholt had a very short election campaign, but she managed to make several notable appearances. Steinholt focused on environmental issues during the campaign, and opposed the establishment of a petroleum plant in northern Norway. Under her leadership, Red Norddland received 2,956 votes, 3.0 percent of the votes, an increase of 0.9% from the previous local election in 2003. Red won another seat on the Nordland County Council during the election; Steinholt became the youngest member of the council.

One of Steinholt's campaign promises was to put an end to the activities of the petroleum industry close to Lofoten and Vesterålen because of potentially hazardous effects on the environment. When asked if she had any political allies in parliament who could help her, Steinholt replied, "Our most important partners are not in Parliament [but instead] those organisations whose main goal is to improve conditions for the Norwegian people. We must ensure that the Public Action For an Oil-Free Lofoten and Vesterålen will be heard".

In November 2009, Alstahaug Municipality cut the budgets of youth organisations by an estimated 400,000 kr. Steinholt opposed this, saying that if the wages of the mayor and several other high-ranking politicians had been cut, the municipality could have saved NOK 487,000. In the 2009 parliamentary election Steinholt received 1,829 votes, again as Red Nordland's leading candidate.

She was elected a member of Red Youth's Central Board in 2006; her term expired in 2010. In 2008 Steinholt became a member of Red Youth's National Board; her term expired in 2010.

== Views ==
Steinholt has stated that she feels the government should reduce unnecessary theory in the vocational education programme in upper secondary school; she believes it to be the main reason why an increasing numbers of pupils are dropping out of school. The Norwegian Government, Steinholt believes, should increase their funding for vocational education programmes and jobs; she states that people with this type of education "are the cornerstone of our society". Steinholt believes there is a broad consensus in the labor movement that the Contractual Pension (Avtalefestet pensjon) bill holds a hostile policy towards the working class. Interpellations led to a debate in the City Council, mainly between Steinholt and County Cabinet leader Odd Eriksen. She believed it would be disrespectful towards workers to deprive them the right of a dignified work age, feeling that forcing them to quit their jobs at the age of 62 is too early.

She is strongly opposed to oil drilling in Lofoten, arguing that oil drilling would lead to conditions hazardous to the area. In July 2009 she told Klassekampen that the government should give emergency funding to Norwegian companies who work on developing renewable energy instead of just giving it to the banks.

Steinholt does not believe that small municipalities should be merged because of their economic problems. She feels the government focus on the struggling economy of the municipalities should be towards cleaning up their debt. In 2008 alone, the municipalities of Norway had a gathered debt of NOK 20.7 billion. She stated that if Red was elected to parliament, they would propose a bill giving the municipalities an immediate transfer of NOK 10 billion.
