= Stine Westrum =

Norwegian politician (born 1977)

Stine Westrum (born 29 May 1977) is a Norwegian trade unionist and politician for the Red Party.

Westrum was a local leader within the Norwegian Union of Municipal and General Employees. When the Red Party nominated its candidates for the 2021 Norwegian parliamentary election ballot, Westrum received "whole-hearted" backing from her union. She was elected as a deputy representative to the Parliament of Norway from Oslo for the term 2021–2025. Starting in November 2023, she filled in for Bjørnar Moxnes as he was put on sick leave for thieving.
