= Sofie Marhaug =

Norwegian politician (born 1990)

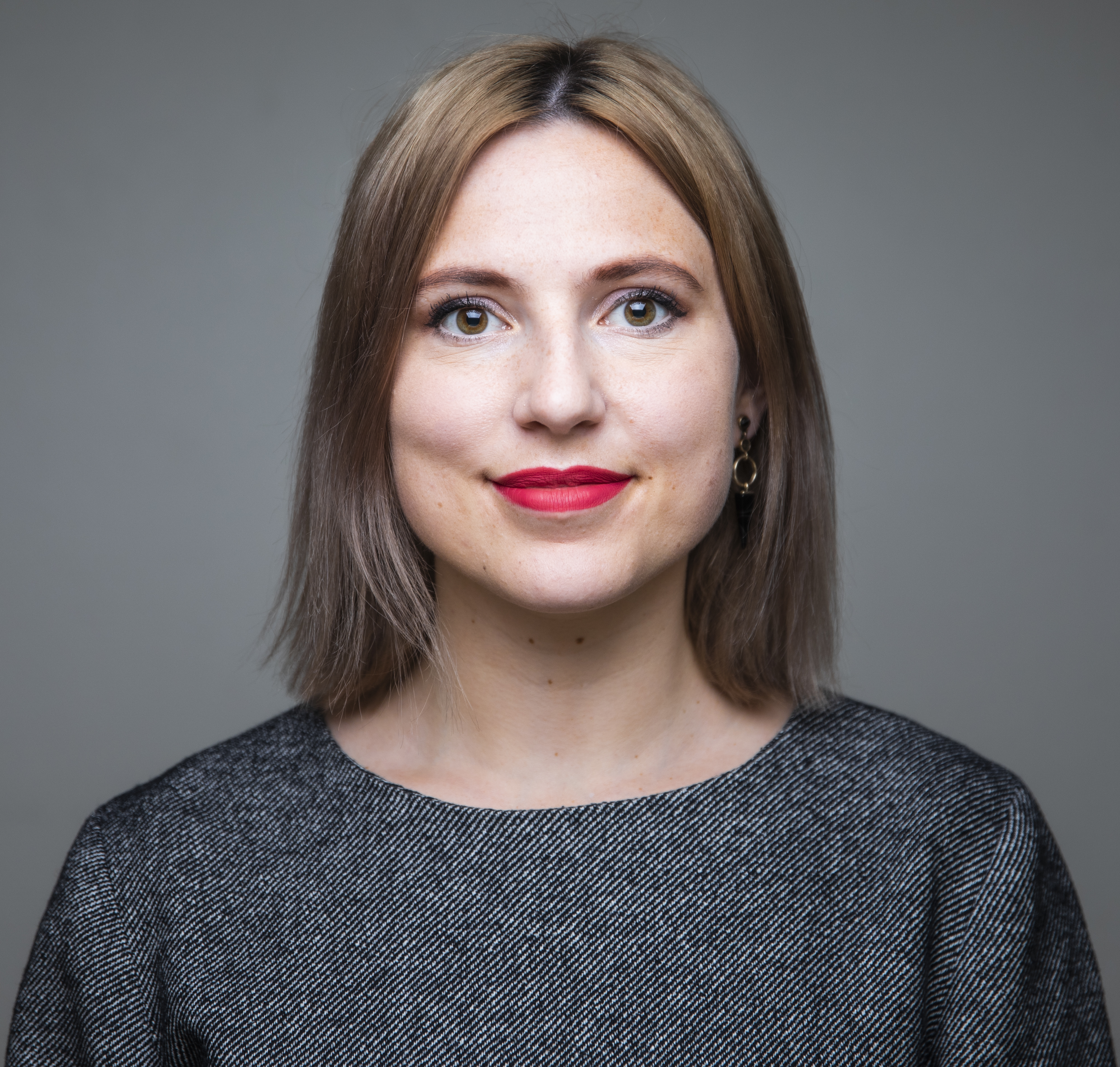

First Deputy Leader of the Red Party
- Incumbent
- Assumed office 24 May 2024
- Leader: Marie Sneve Martinussen
- Preceded by: Marie Sneve Martinussen

Member of the Storting
- Incumbent
- Assumed office 1 October 2021
- Constituency: Hordaland

Personal details
- Born: 24 May 1990 (age 36)
- Party: Red
- Domestic partner: Mímir Kristjánsson
- Occupation: Politician

Sofie Marhaug (born 24 May 1990) is a Norwegian politician for the Red Party. She has been a member of the Storting for Hordaland since 2021 and first deputy leader of the party since 2024.

== Political career ==
=== Local politics ===
She has been a member of the Bergen municipal council since 2011 and been her party's group leader since 2017.

=== Party politics ===
In April 2024, both she and her partner Mímir Kristjánsson announced their candidacies for deputy leader of their party at the extraordinary convention to be held in May. The party's electoral committee ultimately opted to suggest Marhaug as deputy leader ahead of the party convention, with Marie Sneve Martinussen as leader. Her candidacy was challenged at the convention by Ravn Villtokt, but Marhaug merged victorious with a majority of votes.

=== Parliament ===
She was elected representative to the Storting from the constituency of Hordaland for the period 2021–2025, for the Red Party. There she sits on the Standing Committee on Energy and the Environment and the Election Committee, on the former of which she also serves as second vice chair.

In February 2024, she announced her nomination of Julian Assange for the Nobel Peace Prize, citing his vital role in exposing war crimes and contribution to peace.

She was reelected representative to the Storting from Hordaland for the period 2025–2029.

== Personal life ==
Marhaug was born on 24 May 1990.

In August 2022, it was revealed that she had entered a relationship with fellow Red Party MP Mímir Kristjánsson. In October 2023, she moved from her native Bergen to Stavanger in order to live with Kristjánsson. In February 2026, they announced that they were expecting their first child together.

== Publications ==
In 2024 she published the book Hjelp, de drar til Sveits!, written jointly with Mímir Kristjánsson.
