= Torstein Dahle =

Norwegian politician and economist

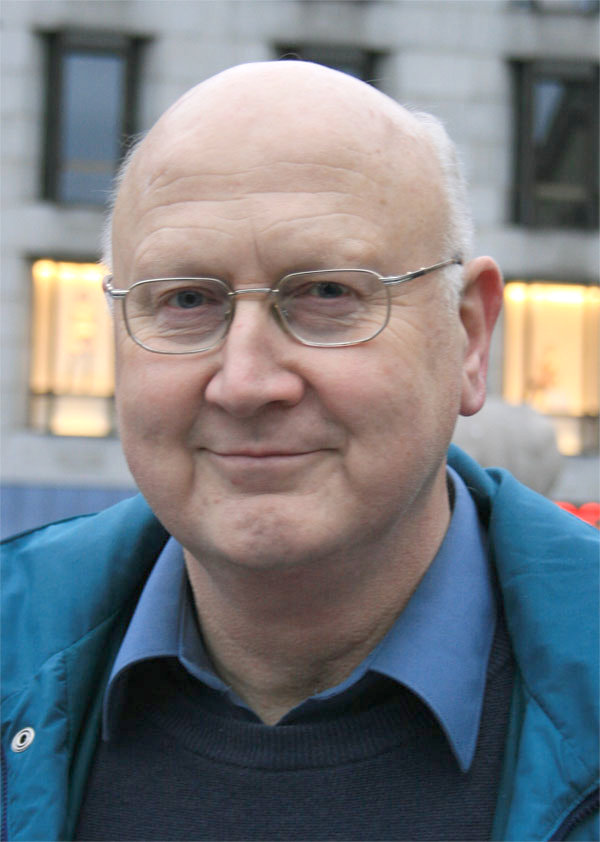
- Dahle in 2007

Leader of the Red Party
- In office 11 March 2007 – 30 May 2010
- Deputy: Ingrid Baltzersen; Ana Lopez Taylor
- Preceded by: None; Himself as leader of the Red Electoral Alliance
- Succeeded by: Turid Thomassen

Personal details
- Born: 20 February 1947 (age 79) Oslo, Norway
- Party: Red
- Education: Norwegian School of Economics
- Occupation: Professor
- Profession: Economist

Torstein Dahle (born 20 February 1947) is a Norwegian politician and economist. He works at the Bergen University College and represents Red Party in the city council of Bergen. Dahle was born in Oslo.

At age 14, Dahle joined Lambertseter Youth Conservatives (Unge Høyre). He attended Oslo Cathedral School and Oslo Commerce School. After moving to Bergen in 1966, he moved to the far left and co-founded the Maoist group AKP(m-l) in the early 1970s. He remained in the party until 1997.

From 2003 to 2007, Dahle led the AKP(m-l)-initiated Red Electoral Alliance, which he had also helped establish. He continued to lead the Red Party, a 2007 merger of AKP(m-l) and the Red Electoral Alliance. In 2010, he was succeeded as Red Party leader by Turid Thomassen.

Dahle is openly gay since the late 1960s.

Political offices
Preceded by Aslak Sira Myhre	Leader of Red Electoral Alliance; 2003–2007	Succeeded by position abolished
Preceded by position created	Leader of Red; 2007–2010	Succeeded by Turid Thomassen
