= Society Party (Norway) =

Norwegian political party

Society Party Samfunnspartiet
- Leader: Bjørn Dahl
- Founded: 1985
- Headquarters: Oslo
- Ideology: Anarchism; Euroscepticism

Website
- https://bjorndahlsite.wordpress.com/about/

The Society Party (Norwegian: Samfunnspartiet) was a self-proclaimed anarchist political party in Norway. The party was founded by Øystein Meier Johannessen in 1985 and removed from Norway's official registry of political parties in 2026.

Its focus was on Northern Norway-related issues. The party also sympathised with the Palestinians in the Israeli–Palestinian conflict. If Norway joins the European Union, the Society Party stated that it would work for North-Norwegian secession from Norway.

The party has been involved in several controversies. In 2005, Meier Johannesen placed a van which in Arabic proclaimed "God is great! Jihad continues until the Jews are out of Palestine. Dust you are and to dust you will return" outside of national broadcasting company NRK's facilities, and was sentenced to 30 days in jail for the stunt.

The party has also been listing famous people, including comedian Otto Jespersen and bishop Øystein I. Larsen, for local and national election against their will. Defense attorney Tor Erling Staff was a member of the party and ran for election several times. In the 2013 parliamentary elections, the party obtained 295 votes. Bjørn Dahl was the last leader of the party and a candidate running for the 2021 Norwegian parliamentary election.
