= Marie Sneve Martinussen =

Norwegian politician

- Martinussen in 2024

Member of the Storting
- Incumbent
- Assumed office 1 October 2021
- Constituency: Akershus

Leader of the Red Party
- Incumbent
- Assumed office 3 July 2023; Acting: 3 July 2023 – 24 May 2024
- First Deputy: Sofie Marhaug
- Second Deputy: Charlotte Therkelsen
- Preceded by: Bjørnar Moxnes

First Deputy Leader of the Red Party
- In office 6 May 2012 – 24 July 2023
- Leader: Bjørnar Moxnes
- Preceded by: Bjørnar Moxnes
- Succeeded by: Sofie Marhaug

Personal details
- Born: 30 December 1985 (age 40) Sør-Varanger, Finnmark, Norway
- Party: Red
- Education: University of Oslo
- Occupation: Politician; Musician; Social economist

Marie Sneve Martinussen (born 30 December 1985) is a Norwegian musician and politician representing the Red Party. She has represented Akershus in the Storting since 2021 and served as the party's first deputy leader from 2012 to 2023, and leader since 2023.

== Early life and education ==
Born on 30 December 1985, Martinussen spent her childhood in Sør-Varanger Municipality. She is of Kven descent, through her maternal grandmother. Growing up, she was active in the organization Nature and Youth. She later attended the University of Oslo and graduated with a MA degree in social economics.

== Musical career ==
In the early 2000s, Martinussen played bass guitar in the indie pop band Making Marks, performing regularly on stages in Oslo from 2007.

== Political career ==
=== Parliament ===
A member of the Red Party since 2009, Martinussen was elected representative to the Storting from the constituency of Akershus for the period 2021–2025, for this party. In the Storting, she is a member of the Standing Committee on Finance and Economic Affairs from 2021 to 2025, and of the Enlarged Committee on Foreign Affairs and Defence from 2023 to 2025.

She was reelected representative to the Storting from Akershus for the period 2025–2029.

=== Deputy party leader ===
She was elected first deputy leader at the 2012 party convention, with Bjørnar Moxnes as leader. In her capacity as deputy leader, she has also been the head of the Popvenstre festival.

In June 2023, Moxnes was involved in a shoplifting incident at Oslo Airport Gardermoen. Shortly after the revelation, on 3 July, the party announced that he would go on sick leave and Sneve Martinussen became acting leader. On 18 July, the party announced that his sick leave would be expanded to 25 July. On 24 July, Moxnes announced that he would resign as leader and Sneve Martinussen was installed as his successor until the 2024 convention. On 29 February 2024, she announced her intention to seek becoming leader permanently at the convention in May. The party's electoral committee opted in April to suggest her as leader and Sofie Marhaug as first deputy leader ahead of the convention. She was unanimously elected leader at the convention on 24 May.
