= Turid Thomassen =

Norwegian socialist politician

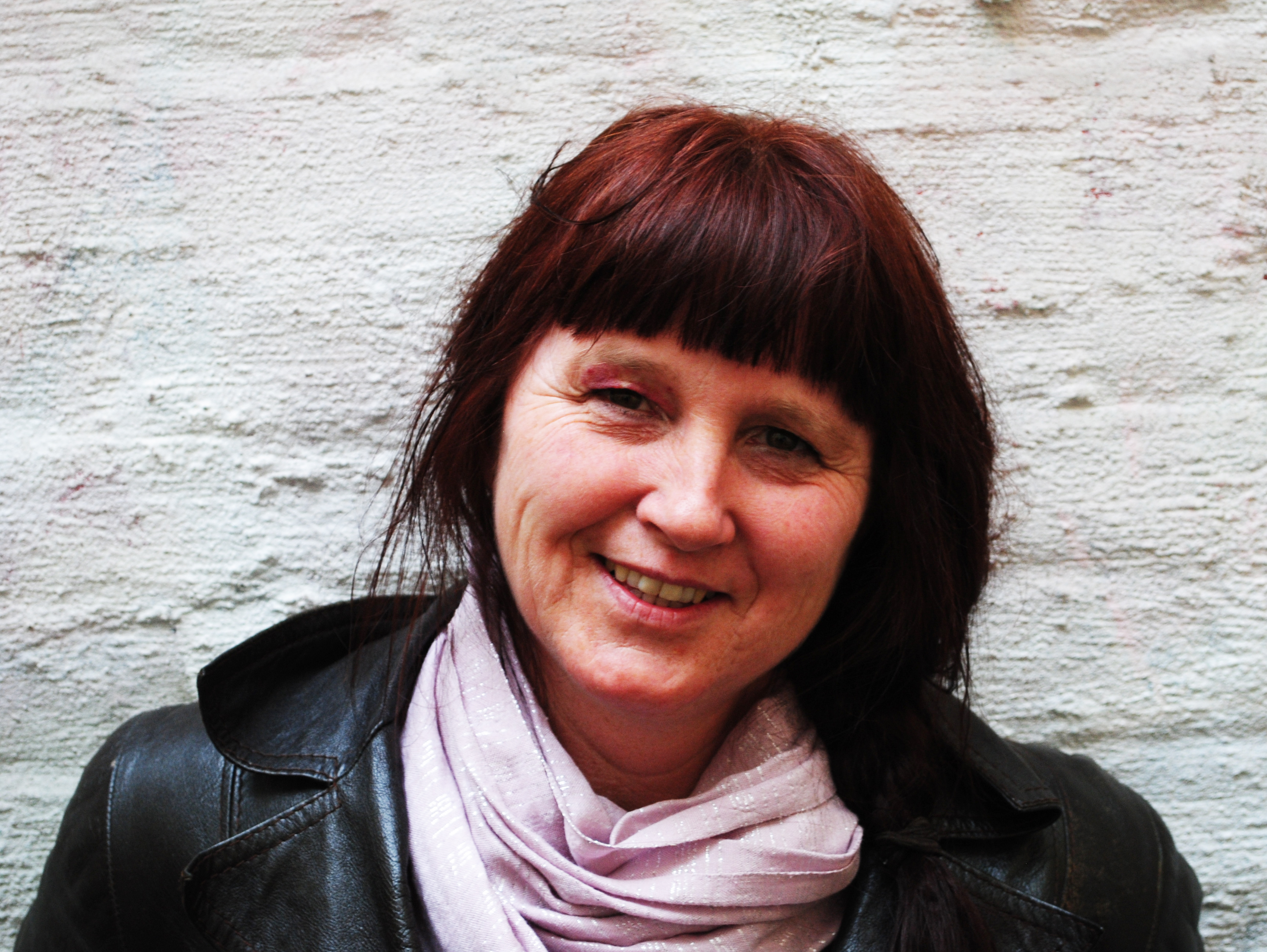
- Turid Thomassen in 2010

Leader of the Red Party
- In office 30 May 2010 – 6 May 2012
- Deputy: Bjørnar Moxnes
- Preceded by: Torstein Dahle
- Succeeded by: Bjørnar Moxnes

Personal details
- Born: 19 April 1965 (age 60) Stathelle, Telemark, Norway
- Party: Red

Turid Thomassen (born 19 April 1965) is a Norwegian politician who was party leader of the Norwegian Red party from 2010 to 2012, succeeding Torstein Dahle.

Born in Stathelle, Telemark, Thomassen works in the administration offices of the Department for Television Education and Film Science at the Lillehammer University College, where she is also the highest union representative for the Norwegian Civil Service Union.

Since 1999, she has been a member of Lillehammer city council and at the Norwegian parliamentary election in 2009, she was her party's first candidate on the county ballot for Oppland.

Thomassen was elected as party leader of Red at the party's general assembly on 30 May 2010 after many years as member of Red Youth, Red Electoral Alliance and the Workers' Communist Party. She was succeeded by Bjørnar Moxnes at the 2012 general assembly on 6 May.

Political offices
Preceded by Torstein Dahle	Leader of Red; 2010–2012	Succeeded by Bjørnar Moxnes
