= Election Committee (Parliament of Norway) =

Parliamentary committee in Norway

The Election Committee Norwegian: Valgkomiteen) is a special committee of the Parliament of Norway. The 37 members are responsible for allocating the members of parliament in the various standing and special committees and to allocate the members of the presidium. The committee is also used to conduct elections.
