= Bjørnar Moxnes =

Norwegian politician

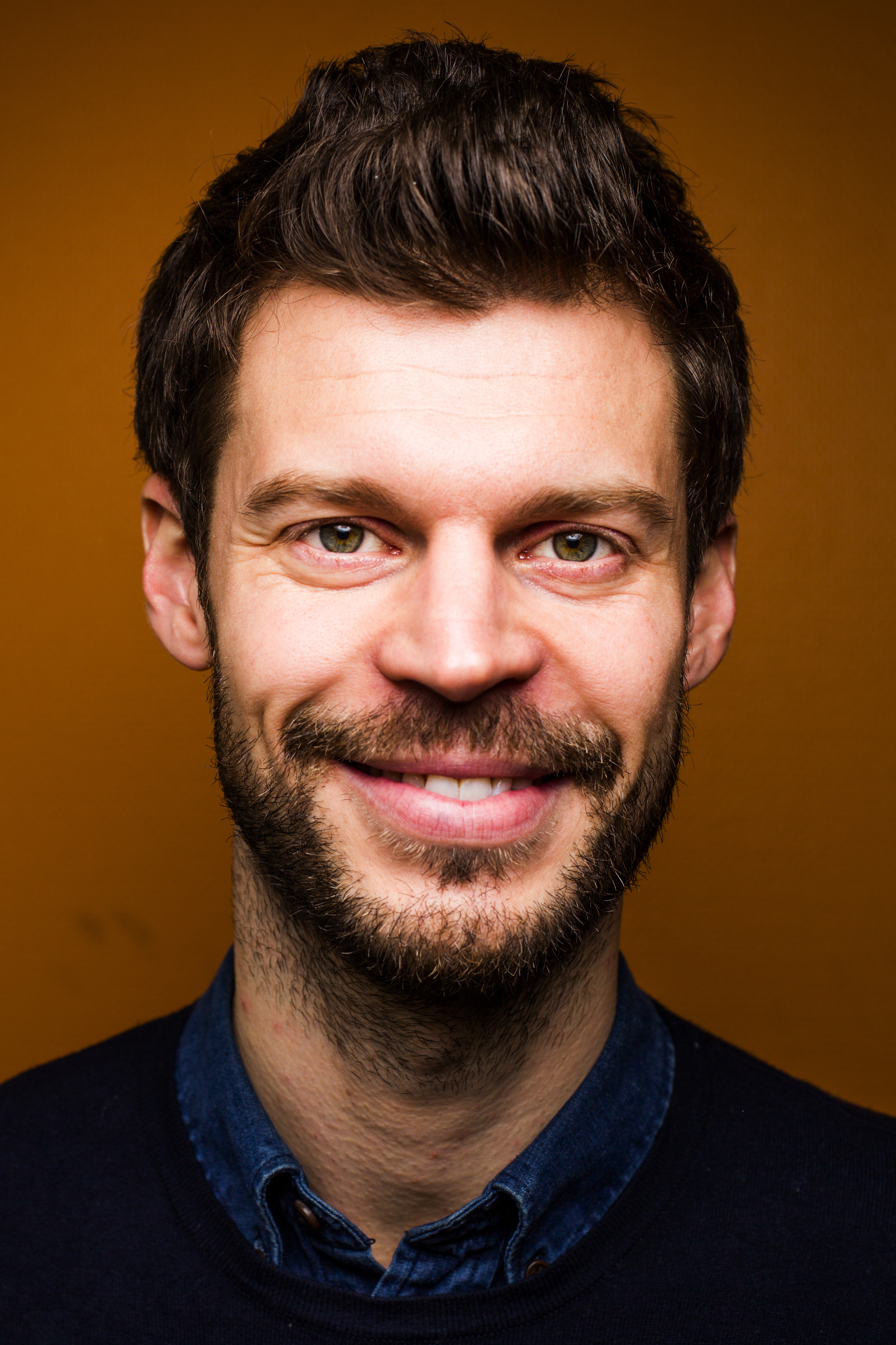
- Moxnes in 2016

Member of the Norwegian Parliament
- Incumbent
- Assumed office 1 October 2017
- Constituency: Oslo

Leader of the Red Party
- In office 6 May 2012 – 24 July 2023
- First Deputy: Marie Sneve Martinussen
- Second Deputy: Marielle Leraand; Silje Josten Kjosbakken; Charlotte Therkelsen
- Preceded by: Turid Thomassen
- Succeeded by: Marie Sneve Martinussen

Deputy Leader of the Red Party
- In office 30 May 2010 – 6 May 2012
- Leader: Turid Thomassen
- Succeeded by: Marie Sneve Martinussen

Personal details
- Born: Bjørnar Eide Moxnes; 19 December 1981 (age 44) Oslo, Norway
- Party: Red
- Spouse(s): Kjerstin Aukrust (m. 2014; div. 2022) Lina Aas-Eng (m. 2024)
- Children: 2
- Education: Sociology

Bjørnar Moxnes (born 19 December 1981) is a Norwegian politician and activist representing the left-wing political party, the Red Party in the Storting. Moxnes opposes the European Union, characterizing Norway's participation in the EEA as undemocratic. Moxnes describes himself as a socialist. He served as the leader of the Red Party from 2012 to 2023, when he resigned in the wake of stealing a pair of sunglasses from a shop at Oslo Airport Gardermoen. Moxnes had previously served as the party's deputy leader from 2010 to 2012.

== Biography ==
Moxnes grew up in Nordstrand, Norway, with his parents. His mother was a health scientist, and his father worked in a kindergarten. He became politically active after neo-Nazis started to stand out in the city in the 1990s. Later, he became part of the radical community in Oslo Cathedral School, and a member of Red Youth.

=== Education ===
Moxnes has a degree in sociology from the University of Oslo. His master's thesis Med makt i Bagasjen, En analyse av politkerelitens yrkesmobilitet (With Power in the Luggage, An Analysis of the Political Elite's occupational mobility) was about politicians changing careers to PR, a subject Moxnes was very interested in as a politician.

=== Leadership in Red Youth ===
In 2004, Moxnes after two years of being a secretary, was chosen to become the leader of Red Youth. As a leader, Moxnes represented Red Youth in the Supreme Court of Norway, where the organisation was sentenced for publishing schoolbooks for free on the internet. Moxnes ranked eighth in Verdens Gang's survey of the country's biggest political talents.

=== Politician and party leader of Red ===
After Moxnes stepped down as leader of Red Youth, he was elected to the leadership of Red Electoral Alliance. After the establishment of the party Red in 2007, Moxnes was elected into the leadership. In 2010, he was chosen as deputy leader of Red, and on 6 May 2012, he replaced Turid Thomassen as the party's leader.

In 2011, Moxnes was elected to Oslo's council. He has since then been a very central politician in many Oslo-situations for defending Oslo University Hospital, protesting against the sculpture park in Ekebergskogen, and was against the Olympics in Oslo for the 2022 Olympics.

During the national elections in 2013 and 2017, Moxnes was the first candidate for Red in the Oslo district, and in 2017, he was elected as a representative in the Storting.

In June 2023, Romerikes Blad revealed that Moxnes had been caught shoplifting a pair of sunglasses at Oslo Gardermoen airport. He initially claimed it was an accident, but it was later revealed that he had removed the pricetag and stuffed them in his suitcase, raising questions about the sincerity of his explanation. With Moxnes' consent, the newspaper Verdens Gang released the surveillance footage showing him taking the sunglasses and placing them first on his luggage trolley, then putting them in his pocket shortly thereafter. On 3 July, the party secretary Reidar Strisland confirmed that Moxnes had taken leave as party leader and that deputy leader Marie Sneve Martinussen would become interim leader. On 18 July, the party announced that his sick leave would be expanded to 25 July. On 24 July, Moxnes announced that he would resign as leader and deputy leader Marie Sneve Martinussen was designated his successor until the 2024 convention.

=== The Lindeberg case ===
In March 2014, the Oslo council decided to report Moxnes for violating the duty of confidentiality, after a leaking in the Lindeberg case. In November 2011, health worker Stig Berntsen was accused of abuse towards multiple patients at the Lindebergs Omsorgssenter, where he worked as a health worker and had a duty of trust. He was charged by the police, where they investigated the accusations, and Berntsen was temporarily removed from his position. It was quickly obvious that the Oslo Municipality Nursing Administration were not following their own routines for abuse situations. The police dropped charges in June 2012. Berntsen did not get his position at Lindeberg back, but did retain authorization as a health professional.

Kommunerevisjonen researched the case and released a report which had scornful critique against the Oslo council.

In June 2013, Fagforbundet issued a summons against the Oslo council with demands that Berntsen regained his job. In November of the same year, the council retreated. After two rounds of mediation, Berntsen got his job back, and received 410 000 crowns in compensation for lost wages.

On 24 January 2014, Moxnes publicized the Kommunerevisjonen-report. On 5 March, a majority in the Oslo council reported Moxnes for violating his duty of confidentiality. Moxnes himself argued that he had done nothing unlawful, and that the report was an attempt to gag a politician who was part of the opposition. Arne Jensen, the General Secretary in Norsk Redaktørforening, characterized the report as unworthy. Jan Fridthjof Bernt, a law professor, claimed that Moxnes had not broken his duty. Stig Berntsen even came out in support of Moxnes.

Before the trial, Moxnes stated that "I will not be instructed or gagged by decisions the others make. I refuse to accept that other politicians hide information that is important for patients and other workers, which is important for the rule of law."

The case landed in the Oslo District Court, and on 15 September, Moxnes was acquitted. The court heavily stressed that the information that was released in the report did not contain information that identified the persons involved. Moxnes characterized the acquittal as a victory for freedom of speech, and stated that he intends to use it in further struggle for increased transparency. At the awarding of the Norwegian Press Association's Flavius Prize on 26 January 2016, Moxnes received an honorable mention. He got the Vote of the Year from NATT&DAG.

== Politics ==
=== Economics ===
Moxnes opposes right-wing economics, believing that most other parties in Stortinget undermine worker's rights and transfer power from the workers to the rich. He argues for a democratic economy, which he believes is not possible under capitalism. He stated in 2017 that he believes that just like how the people can choose the government, they should be able to choose their leadership in the workplace. He argues that the Conservative Party serves to secure the capitalist rights of the rich minority, where the small elite has too much power over Norway's most important national resources.

He explicitly states that the party is not communist, but socialist, separating themselves from Rødt's predecessor AKP's Maoist roots. He describes socialism as a system where power and wealth is distributed fairly, instead of allowing a small elite to own as much wealth as half of the population on Earth.

Moxnes believes that the wages for politicians in Stortinget is too high, and wants to reduce the wages. Moxnes argues that because the wages are too high, the politicians in government become too disconnected from the general populace, and that reducing it will assist politicians in creating fairer policies. When the Labour Party and the Centre Party elected to freeze wages, he stated that, "If I was Støre (Labour) or Vedum (Centre), I would be embarrassed.", and pushed for reductions in the wages.

=== EEA/European Union ===
Moxnes opposes the EEA, arguing that the deal with the EEA is undemocratic, and that it transfers power from elected assemblies in Norway to the EU. He characterizes the EEA as a croft deal. Moxnes argues that policies that would help Norwegian workers and assist against social dumping are blocked by undemocratic laws enforced by the European Union.

=== Climate ===
Moxnes believes that capitalism is one of the main causes of climate change, arguing that capitalism will not create solutions to solve climate change.

== Personal life ==
He was married to Kjerstin Aukrust from 2014 until they announced their separation in July 2022. Around the same time, he announced that he was in a relationship with Lina Aas-Eng. Together with Aukrust, he has two children. In October 2024, he announced that he and Aas-Eng had married.

In November 2023, Moxnes revealed that he had a mental health problem after being additionally caught stealing from grocery stores in Oslo. He had to relinquish his seat in Parliament temporarily, being put on sick leave. His seat in Parliament was filled by deputy Stine Westrum.
