= Red Party (Norway) =

Socialist political party in Norway

Red Party Rødt Raudt
- Leader: Marie Sneve Martinussen
- Founders: Torstein Dahle; Ingrid Baltzersen
- Founded: 11 March 2007; 19 years ago
- Merger of: Red Electoral Alliance; Workers' Communist Party
- Headquarters: Dronningens gate 22, Oslo
- Newspaper: Klassekampen (largest share of ownership)
- Youth wing: Red Youth
- Membership (2024): ▼13,131
- Ideology: Communism; Anti-capitalism; Socialism; Democratic socialism; Marxism; Republicanism (Norwegian)
- Political position: Left-wing to far-left
- Nordic affiliation: Nordic Green Left Alliance
- Colours: Red; Maroon (customary)
- Slogan: Fordi fellesskap fungerer ('Because community works')
- Storting: 9 / 169
- County Councils: 20 / 574
- Municipal Councils: 192 / 9,344

Website
- roedt.no

The Red Party (Bokmål: Rødt; Nynorsk: Raudt; Northern Sami: Ruoksat, lit. 'The Red') is a socialist and communist political party in Norway. It was founded in March 2007 by a merger of the Red Electoral Alliance and the Workers' Communist Party. A Marxist party, it has been described as left-wing and far-left on the political spectrum. In its political program, the Red Party sets the creation of a classless society to be its ultimate goal, which the party says is "what Karl Marx called communism". The party's other goals are replacing capitalism with socialism, an expansive public sector, and nationalisation of large enterprises. It strongly opposes Norway becoming a member of the European Union. It has been described as communist and democratic socialist.

The Red Party has 20 county council representatives nationwide, and 193 municipal representatives. In the 2013 parliamentary election, it was the largest party that failed to win a seat. The party entered Parliament in the 2017 election, winning 2.4% of the vote and its first seat ever in the Storting. The last time a far-left party had representation in the Storting was when its predecessor party, the Red Electoral Alliance, won a seat in 1993. In the 2025 parliamentary election, the party achieved its best result ever, with 5.3% of the vote, securing nine seats in Parliament.

== Ideology and positions ==
Based on its political programme, the Red Party can be described as a democratic socialist, Marxist and communist political movement. The party views the continuing social and economic inequality as the biggest threat to democracy, the welfare state and a sustainable future. This inequality is, according to the Red party, sustained by neoliberal capitalism. As such, the party takes on an explicitly anti-capitalist stance. It aims towards new legislatures taking power on behalf of the workers. The party does not support violent armed revolution as espoused by its predecessors in the 1970s–1980s.

=== Social and environmental policies ===
In its political program, the Red Party outlines the aspects of its social policy. The party strives to build a society based on equality, with respect for human rights, solidarity, and diversity. A key ideological goal is to create a political space where everyone should be able to participate on equal terms. Such a space can only be obtained by abolishing "capitalism and its inherent undemocratic nature", the party states. The party also blames the inherently growth-driven aspects of capitalism for the widespread natural destruction that has occurred since the Industrial Revolution. It calls for an "economy that respects the limits of nature".

The party is traditionally regarded as part of the "Green bloc" in Norway, although it was criticised in 2007 for being against wind power, both on and off-shore, as well as to the electrification of oil platforms.

The party strongly supports the queer community, and commits itself to feminism and anti-racism. Among other policies, it supports abortion on demand until the 22nd week of pregnancy, calls to introduce a third judicial gender, and other socially progressive policies. The party opposes prostitution, and supports the ban on purchasing sex.

=== Economic policy and views on the welfare state ===
The party strongly supports key aspects of the Nordic model. It argues the model's "traditional emphasis on community solutions have created societies with a high standard of living and political change driven by collective action". The party therefore supports the existing welfare state in Norway and high taxation upon the wealthy as a means of tackling continuing economic inequality in Norway. The party views the labour movement as a vehicle to achieve these aims, and also officially encourages its members and sympathizers to join the labor movement.

Member of the Storting, Mímir Kristjánsson has said that the "right-wing parties have proven their willingness to dismantle the very foundation of our welfare state." According to Kristjánsson, the socialist parties, along with the Labour Party, need to be forced into a policy which strongly protects the welfare system for the poor.

In the aftermath of the 2021 Norwegian parliamentary election, Kristjánsson said that the political right, funded by the right-wing fundraiser-billionaire Stein Erik Hagen, engaged in a Red Scare campaign "to brand the Red Party as supporters of a Stalinist genocide and Communist dictatorship" in which the party is seen as "just as bad as the Nazi Party", even though "it has fought long and hard to convince voters of their commitment to a democratic form of Marxist socialism built on the proud Norwegian labor movement's most radical traditions."

The party has campaigned relentlessly against what it calls "welfare profiteurs". It argues that the current models for public financing of kindergartens and elderly care homes, which allows for private persons or companies to retain profits derived from public funds, enables and encourages the owners of private establishments to offer lower pay and pensions.

=== Views on democracy ===
The party argues capitalism is inherently undemocratic as "not only the decisive power over the large banks and companies are in the hands of a small economic elite, but also the decisions taken within these organizations are dictated from above". It recognizes the inherent participatory aspects of civil organizations and associations, and wishes to implement the same principles at the workplace.

The explicit mention of communism in its programme has been the subject of long-standing controversy domestically and within the party. After being challenged on the party's position on liberal democracy in 2012, then party leader Moxnes wrote in Aftenposten that "free speech, freedom of association, free elections, free media, and independent courts that guarantee rule of law for individuals are fundamental for a socialist society". The party is programmatically and ideologically committed to communism as of 2017, but also to the deepening of democratic institutions.

=== Foreign policy ===
The party is internationalist in outlook, and regularly calls for solidarity with those who "suffer from capitalist competition, climate change, oppression and war". The party considers international solidarity as deeply rooted in the labor movement.

The party is Eurosceptic and supports replacing the EEA agreement with a trade agreement. Its sceptical stance is rooted in a concern for social dumping and erosion of sovereignty. Although the party also supports the withdrawal of Norway from NATO, it is not considered a priority before Norway can join another viable alliance, preferably an agreement with the other Nordic states.

The party has been clear on its support for Ukraine during the Russian invasion of Ukraine, including support for Norwegian weapon shipments to Ukraine. However, the party is against the deployment of Norwegian forces and the shipment of F-16 fighter jets to Ukraine. The party additionally supports Norway's recognition of Palestine.

=== Stance on the monarchy ===
The Red Party is in favor of the replacement of the monarchy with a republican form of government.

== History ==
=== Formation (2007) ===
The Red Party was founded on 7 March 2007 as a merger between the Red Electoral Alliance and the Workers' Communist Party. The two parties had shared the same history for decades, because the Workers' Communist Party founded the Red Electoral Alliance as an electoral party that would promote communist and socialist values. During the national convention held by the Red Electoral Alliance in February 2007, a faction within the party stated it would support the merger of the two parties if any references to communism in the new party program would be removed.

During a secret meeting between the leading staff of both parties on 5 March, a vote was held, with most members supporting the merger. The Workers' Communist Party was official dissolved in April 2007. During the party's first national convention, three names were considered: Red Choice, Solidarity, and Red Cloth. When founded, the party saw it as its main mission to fill "the void" between it and the Red-Green Coalition. When talking about the party program, Torstein Dahle said: "We will bring up issues which have broad agreement among the people of Norway, but are unfortunately not reflected in the other parties' policies."

=== Dahle era (2007–2010) ===
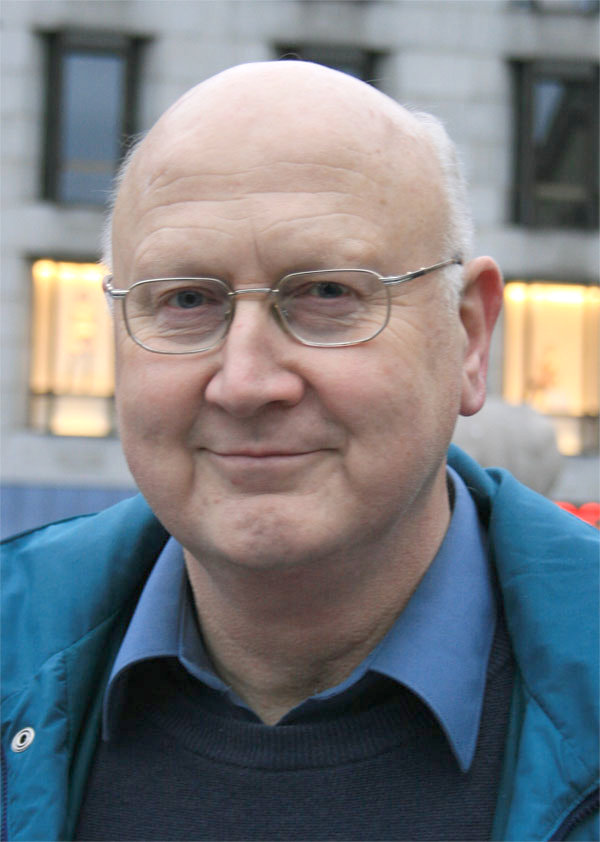
Dahle, the former leader of the Red Party

Torstein Dahle was unanimously elected party leader by members of the Workers' Communist Party and the Red Electoral Alliance in February 2007. This was met with criticism by outsiders, who claimed that Dahle would not be able to lead the party in a "new direction". The then leader of the Workers' Communist Party, Ingrid Baltzersen, was elected the party's deputy leader.

On 23 July 2007, Dahle became subject to media attention when he said that the Taliban and other Afghan rebels had the full right to fight Norwegian soldiers stationed in Afghanistan. The attention occurred only days later with the death of a Norwegian army officer in the Logar Province as a Norwegian military unit came under hostile fire. Dahle later replied to the criticism, saying that he did not support the death of Norwegian military personnel.

When planning for the 2007 Norwegian local elections, the party thought it had a realistic chance of gaining the mayorship in three municipalities. During the local elections, the party was forced to campaign under the banner of the Red Electoral Alliance, as the Election Committee had not approved its new name.

Election researcher Bernt Aardal believed that Red would be able win votes from voters who usually voted for the Socialist Left Party. The reasoning behind this was that the Socialist Left became part of the ruling red–green coalition, and would constantly need to make compromises with the two other parties in the coalition. When confronted with his research, he replied: "This is not a large voter group. We've looked at some polls in the past that RV would give the party one or two seats in Parliament. It is difficult to say whether the new party will make a difference."

After experiencing what many described as a bad election, Trond Andresen, a leading political figure within the party, resigned. He said the party was going in a downward spiral and would meet the same fate as the Communist Party of Norway if it did not renew its image. Among several known candidates that were officially announced or rumoured to be running for party leader were Bjørnar Moxnes, Mona Bjørn, Asgeir Drugli, Mimir Kristjansson, and Ingeborg Steinholt.

=== Thomassen era (2010–2012) ===
Turid Thomassen was voted in as party leader of Red in May 2010. Thomassen has long experience from both the Workers' Communist Party and the Red Electoral Alliance. The former leader of Red Youth (2004–2006), Bjørnar Moxnes, became deputy leader.

Under Thomassen, the party led a motion to boycott Israel in the old Grorud borough district of Oslo.

=== Moxnes era (2012–2023) ===
Bjørnar Moxnes was elected party leader in May 2012. During Moxnes' leadership, the party has increased its vote share severalfold. The party first broke Norway's 4% election threshold in the 2021 parliamentary elections, and entered the Storting with 4,7% and 8 deputies. The party subsequently grew in polls, reaching 10,3% and placing third in a nationwide poll conducted in February 2022 in its highest poll result to date.

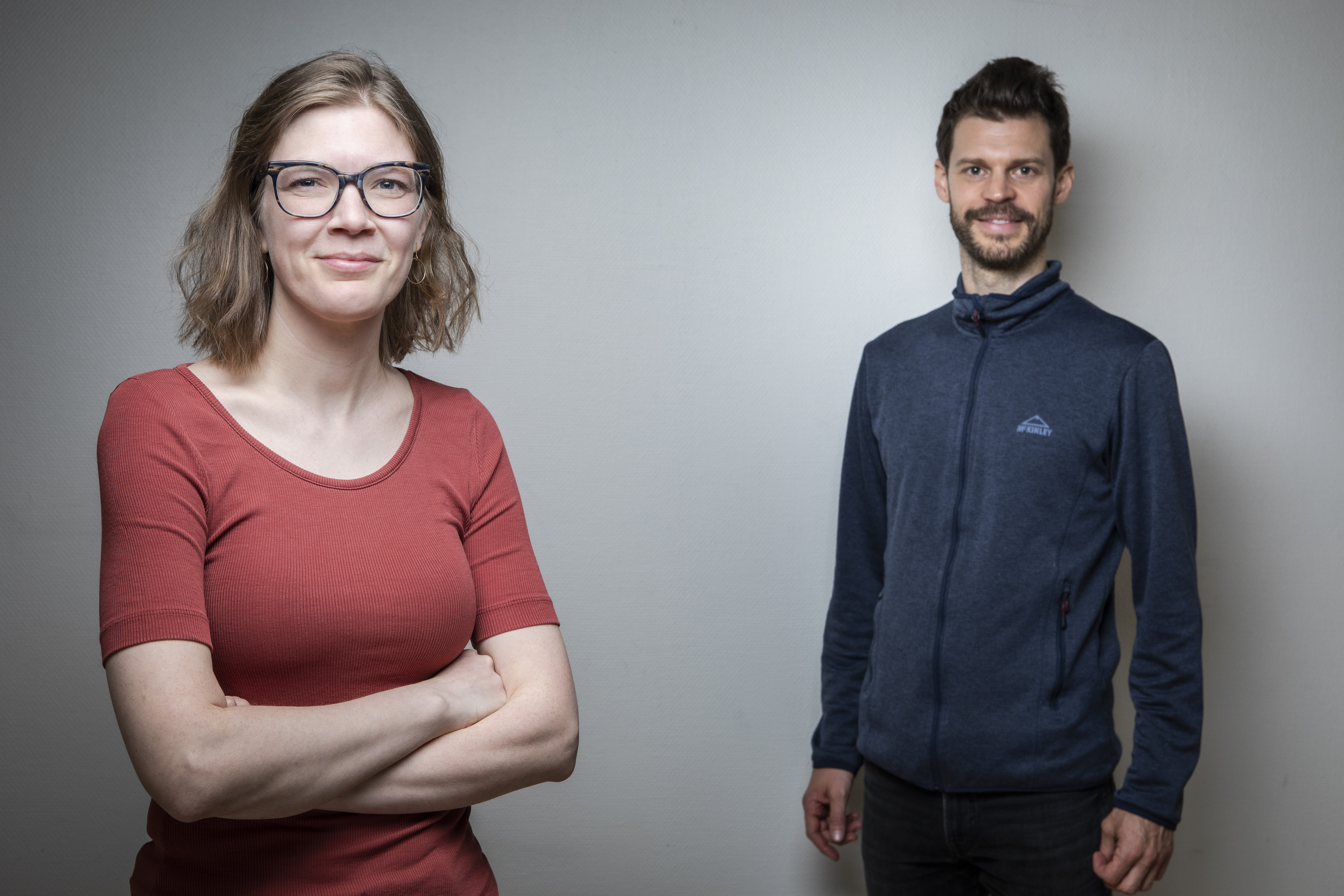
Marie Sneve Martinussen (left) together with former leader Bjørnar Moxnes (right)

On 24 July 2023, Moxnes stepped down as party leader. This happened after an incident in which he stole sunglasses from a shop at Oslo Airport. He initially claimed it happened by accident, but when he was later caught stealing in a grocery store, he confessed that his actions were caused by mental illness, and that he would now seek treatment. He returned to politics in January 2024.

After he stepped down, Moxnes was widely credited by commentators for making his party "mainstream", something never achieved by its predecessors.

=== Sneve Martinussen era (2023–present) ===
Marie Sneve Martinussen has been the party's acting leader since July 2023, and on 9 April 2024, a committee recommended her for a permanent leadership post, subject to a vote in May 2024. She has previously been deputy leader since 2012, and commentators expected her not to make any notable course corrections in regards to strategy.

Her leadership tenure has been marked by a plan to further widen the party's appeal and to "restore the trust in democracy". During a press conference in late 2024, she declared her party was, for the first time, willing to enter a governing agreement after the 2025 Norwegian parliamentary election, should it be an option. During her first year as party leader, the party routinely polled in the 5-6% range. At the 2025 election, the Red Party saw an increase of one seat in the Storting, bringing them to nine, the best result in the party's history.

== Youth programs ==
The party's youth wing is Red Youth, which was founded in 1963, preceding the foundations of the Red Electoral Alliance and the Workers' Communist Party. The current leader of the youth wing is Amrit Kaur. Red Youth was highly supportive of the merging of the Red Electoral Alliance and the Communist Party, with Sandra Johansen, leader of Red Youth in Brønnøysund, claiming "it to have been difficult to be a youth party under two different parent parties".

Former Deputy Leader of the Red Electoral Alliance Marte Mjøs Persen left the party, believing there was a big generational gap between the older and younger members of Red. She further claimed that only the older members, who have their origins from the foundation of the Red Electoral Alliance and the Workers' Communist Party, controlled the party. Persen's statements were met with a positive response by fellow party members and outsiders. Mathias Furevik, who had served as Dahle's campaign manager, agreed with her accusations. Bergen City Council representative, Stine Akre, reluctantly agreed with Persen's accusations and said: "Red is now a party for middle-aged men, and has not been able to get rid of the generation gap. It also means that many younger people will get burned out before they move the party's direction." Persen shortly after joined the Labour Party.

== Election results ==
In the 2007 Norwegian local elections, the Red Party won 2.1% of the votes. After the 2007 county elections, Knut Henning Thygesen became the party's first and only mayor elected through a direct mayor election in Risør Municipality.

In the 2009 Norwegian parliamentary election, the result was 1.3% of votes, giving the party no seats in the parliament. The party came closest to winning a seat in Oslo, where it took nearly 4% of the vote. In 2009, electoral researcher Bernt Aardal commented that the Red Party would have won a single seat in Oslo during the 2009 elections had it not been for the fact that the voting system is designed to ensure that more MPs come from rural areas.

In the 2011 Norwegian local elections, the party won 1.7% of the votes. The Oslo constituency was considered to be where the party had its best chance of gaining a seat in the 2013 Norwegian parliamentary election but failed to win any seats. In the 2017 Norwegian parliamentary election, the party broke through in Oslo, with party leader Moxnes being elected for the first time.

In the 2021 Norwegian parliamentary election, the Red Party achieved 4.6% of votes and secured eight seats in parliament. Four years later, in the 2025 election, the party's vote share increased to 5.3% and it picked up one seat, for a total of nine MPs. In the 2025–2029 term, it serves as a supporting party for the Labour minority government of Jonas Gahr Støre.

=== Storting ===
Election	Leader	Votes	%	Seats	+/–	Position	Status
2009	Torstein Dahle	36,219	1.3	0 / 169	New	▲8th	Extra-parliamentary
2013	Bjørnar Moxnes	30,751	1.1	0 / 169	Steady	▼9th	Extra-parliamentary
2017	Bjørnar Moxnes	70,522	2.4	1 / 169	▲1	9th	Opposition
2021	Bjørnar Moxnes	135,574	4.7	8 / 169	▲7	▲6th	Opposition
2025	Marie Sneve Martinussen	171,342	5.3	9 / 169	▲1	6th	External support

=== Local elections ===
Local councils
Year	Vote %	Type
2007	1.9; 2.1	Municipal; County
2011	1.5; 1.7	Municipal; County
2015	2.0; 2.2	Municipal; County
2019	3.8; 3.9	Municipal; County
2023	3.48; 3.52	Municipal; County

=== Party congresses ===
- ?. (Founding congress) 2007 10–11 March Oslo
- ?. landsmøte 2008 30 May – 1 June Oslo
- ?. landsmøte 2010 Oslo
- ?. landsmøte 2012 Oslo
- ?. landsmøte 2013 12–14 April Oslo
- ?. landsmøte 2015
- ?. landsmøte 2015 29–31 May
- ?. landsmøte 2017 31 March – 2 April
- ?. landsmøte 2019 9–12 May
- ?. landsmøte 2021 4–7 March Zoom
- ?. landsmøte 2023 21–23 April Stavanger
- 1. ekstraordinært landsmøte 24 May Oslo, DOGA

== Party leaders ==
No.	Portrait	Leader	Took office	Left office	Time in office
1	Torstein Dahle	Torstein Dahle	February 2007	30 May 2010	3 years, 118 days
2	Turid Thomassen	Turid Thomassen	30 May 2010	6 May 2012	1 year, 342 days
3	Bjørnar Moxnes	Bjørnar Moxnes	6 May 2012	24 July 2023	11 years, 79 days
4	Marie Sneve Martinussen	Marie Sneve Martinussen	24 July 2023 (Note: Acting leader until 24 May 2024)	Incumbent	3 years, 109 days
