= Red Youth (Norway) =

Norwegian youth organisation

Red Youth Rød Ungdom
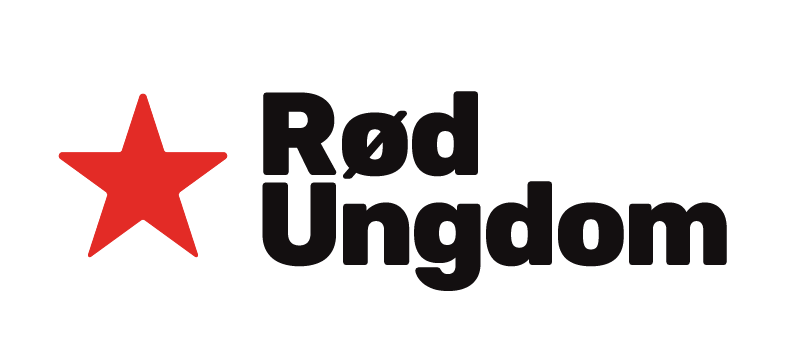
- Leader: Alexandra Fredwall
- Deputy Leader: Frida Graneng, Jaime Manuel Fuentes Medina
- Secretary General: Zelda Borgersrud Øgrim
- Treasurer: Åse Lurås
- Founded: 1963
- Headquarters: Oslo
- Ideology: Marxism; Feminism
- Mother party: Red Party
- Nordic affiliation: Socialistisk Ungdom i Norden (SUN)
- Website: rødungdom.no

Red Youth (Bokmål: Rød Ungdom; Nynorsk: Raud Ungdom; abbr. RU) is a Norwegian youth organisation. It is the youth wing of the Red Party, which was formed from a merger of the Red Electoral Alliance and the Workers' Communist Party in March 2007.

== Politics ==
Red Youth defines itself as a Marxist, Feminist, Anti-racist, revolutionary organization that organizes young people to fight for a socialist democracy where the working class controls society. In order to prevent socialism from developing into a dictatorship, Red Youth believes that society must constantly develop in the direction of a classless society; Communism.

Economically, Red Youth favors a planned economy, which according to them will mean that the economy will be subject to democracy.

Red Youth believes that capitalism is primarily responsible for oppression, class divisions, and hunger. According to RU, a market economy leads to a situation where a minority gains the right to own society's most important resources, resulting in private profit being prioritized over human needs. They argue that the exclusion of the economy from democratic control means that important decisions in economic policy are left to the market rather than to elected representatives. Red Youth believes that a capitalist society leads to a situation where the ballot must yield to money, and democracy gives way to plutocracy.

For Red Youth, communism is a social system aimed at abolishing both the state and private property in favor of the collective. The organization views communism as a society where classes and social gender roles are unnecessary. Their vision is for society to be organized as a community of free interests, collectively deciding how humanity's creative potential can be utilized in the best possible way. As expressed in their program, they believe that such a society will not be without contradictions and problems. They argue that communism will not necessarily eliminate gender oppression, racism, and the waste of natural resources, but that the conditions for the structures that oppress people today will disappear. Red Youth does not believe that a communist society will mark the end of human development, but rather the end of oppression based on social and economic status.

== Activism ==
Red Youth is an activist organisation, and has performed political actions and media stunts directed towards Norwegian politicians. Red Youth interrupted the Christian Democratic Party's national meeting in 2004 in an attempt to expose and highlight what they perceived as the Christian Democrats' anti-homosexual attitude. Also in 2004, members attempted to 'arrest' the Conservative Minister of Education, Kristin Clemet, for allegedly breaking the Norwegian law that secondary education must be free since students were still required to buy textbooks.

The Red Youth also built a refugee asylum in the garden of the Conservative Minister of Local Government, Erna Solberg, in 2008, as a protest against her immigration policies. In 2010, the Red Youth launched a campaign to collect 100,000 NOK to offer Siv Jensen, party leader of the Progress Party, to leave the country in response to her own party's proposal to offer immigrants the same sum to go back to their own countries.

At the end of the 1990s and the early 2000s, Rød Ungdom (Red Youth) campaigned for free school textbooks. In the fall of 2001, Rød Ungdom made 14 school textbooks available for free download on the internet.
