= 1978 in Norway =

- Centuries: 18th; 19th; 20th; 21st
- Decades: 1950s; 1960s; 1970s; 1980s; 1990s
- See also: List of years in Norway

Events in the year 1978 in Norway.

== Incumbents ==
- Monarch – Olav V.
- Prime Minister – Odvar Nordli (Labour Party)

== Events ==
- 15 March – A total ban on skateboards and skateboarding was introduced in Norway.
- 26 June – The Helikopter Service Flight 165 crash; a Sikorsky S-61 helicopter crashes into the North Sea, 78 nautical miles (144 km; 90 mi) northeast of Bergen, en route from Bergen Airport, Flesland to Statfjord A. All eighteen people on board are killed in the crash.
- 28 August – At Hopen, Svalbard, a Soviet Tupolev Tu-16 aircraft accidentally crashes at the sides of Werenskioldfjellet.
- Undated:
  - The Norwegian short international film festival starts.

== Popular culture ==
=== Sports ===
- 15 to 17 September – the 1978 World Orienteering Championships were held in Kongsberg
- 22 October – Lillestrøm wins the 1978 Norwegian Football Cup final by beating Brann 2–1.

=== Literature ===
- Harald Sverdrup, poet and children's writer, is awarded the Dobloug Prize literature award.
- Kjartan Fløgstad is awarded the Nordic Council Literature Prize, for Dalen Portland.

== Notable births ==
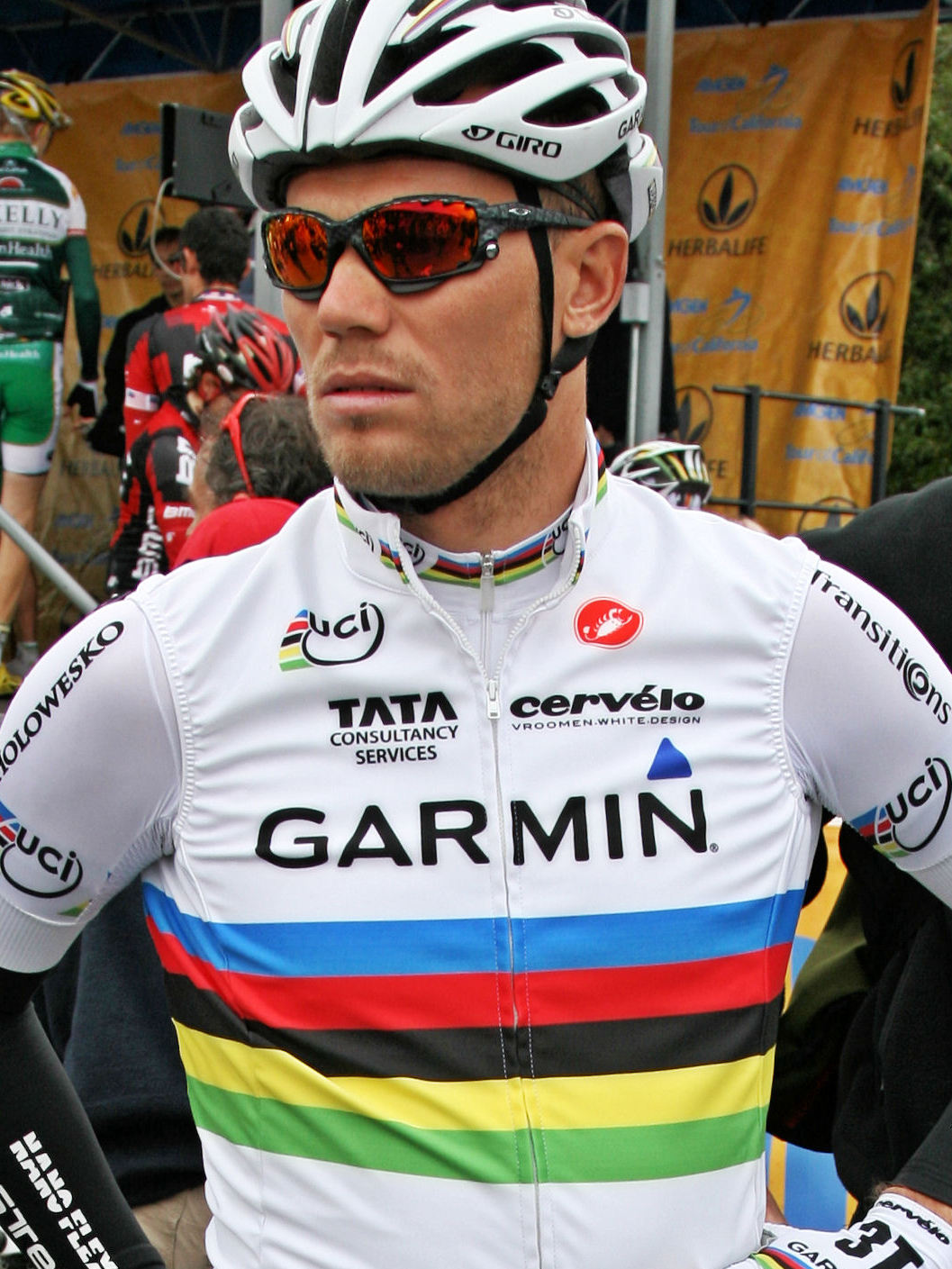
Thor Hushovd, winner of the 2010 World Road Race Championships.

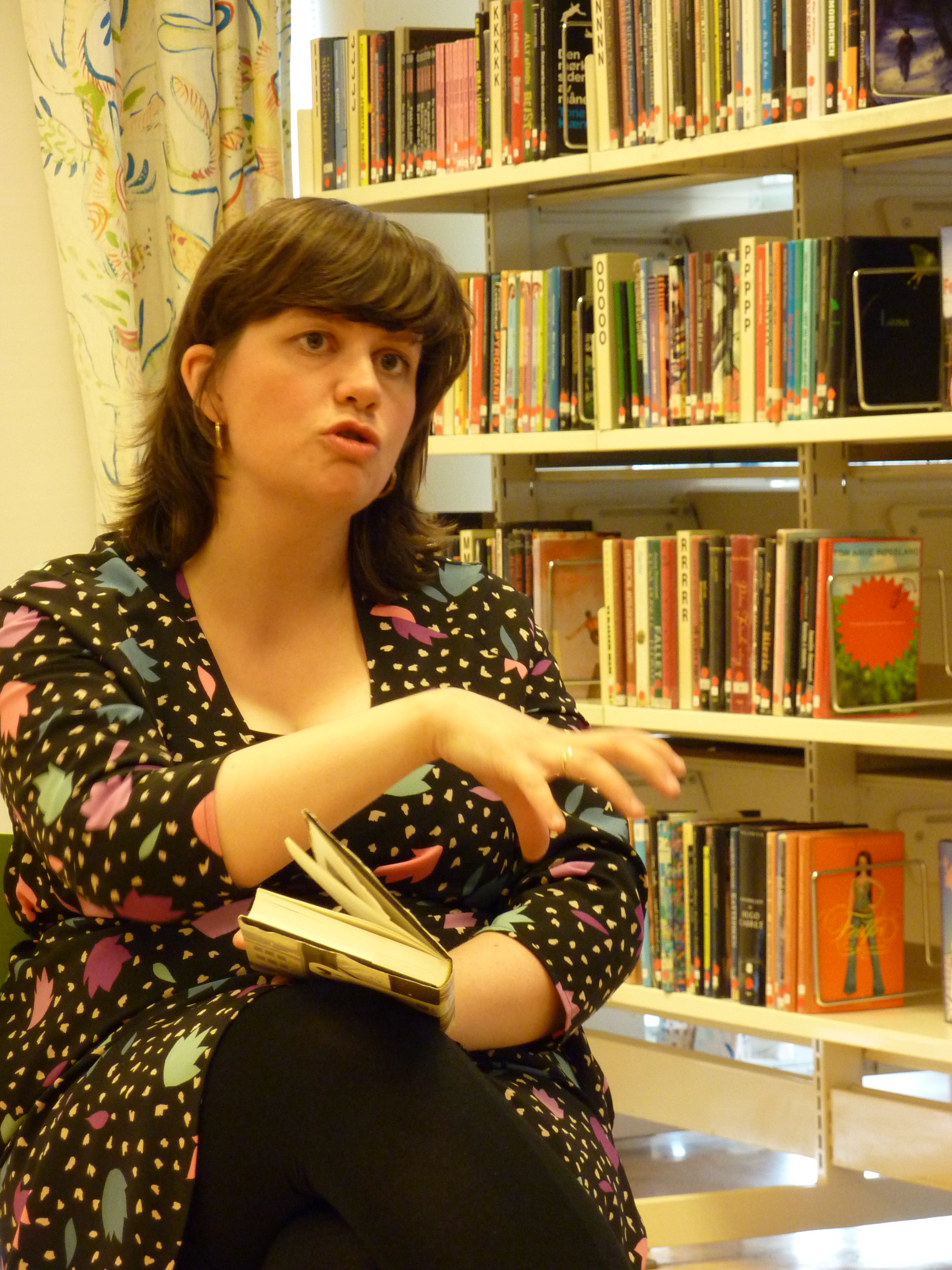
Mirjam Kristensen

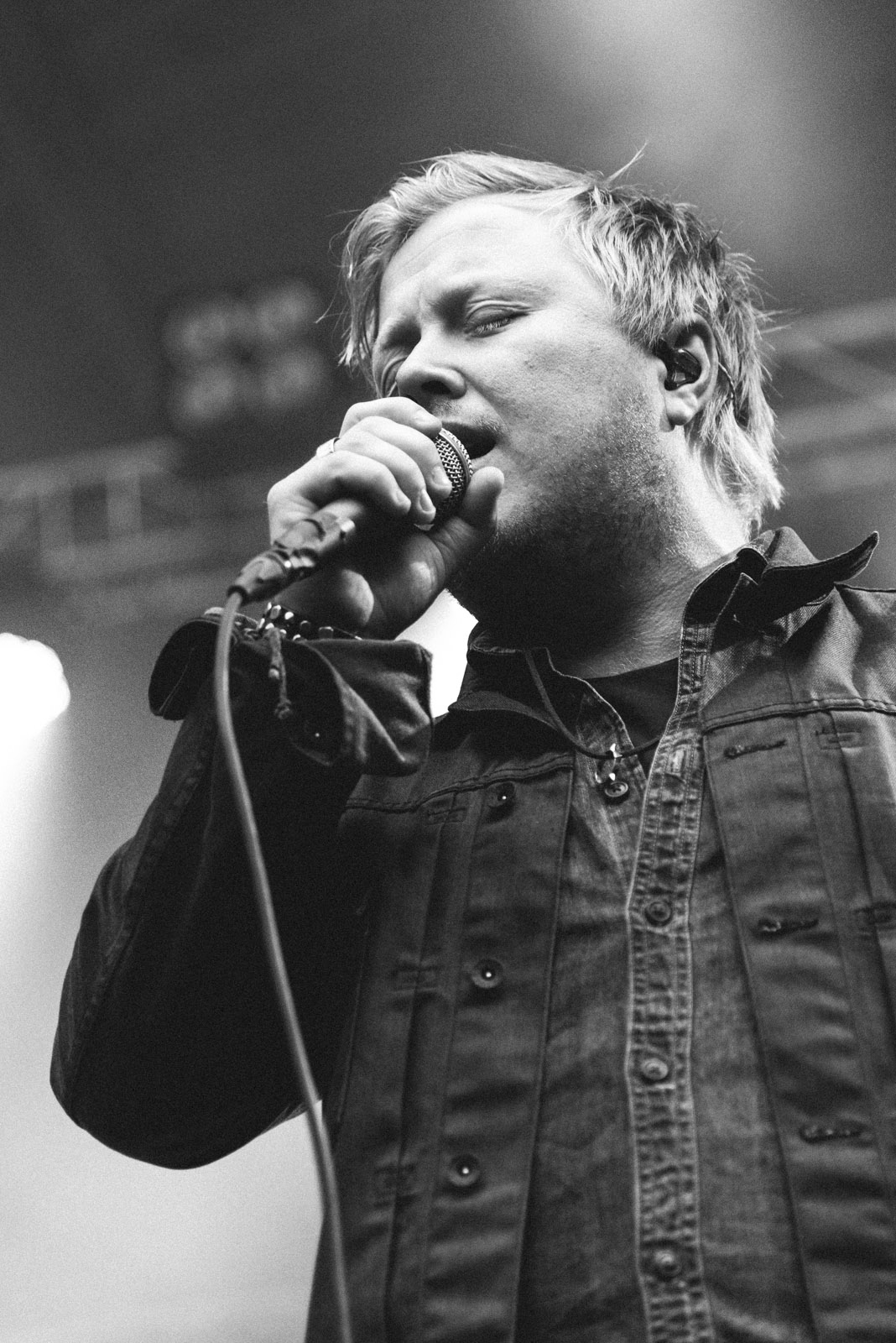
Kurt Nilsen, winner of World Idol.

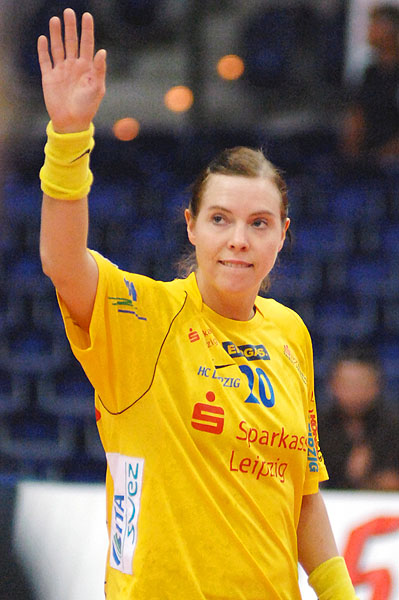
Else-Marthe Sørlie Lybekk, world champion and Olympic gold medalist in handball.

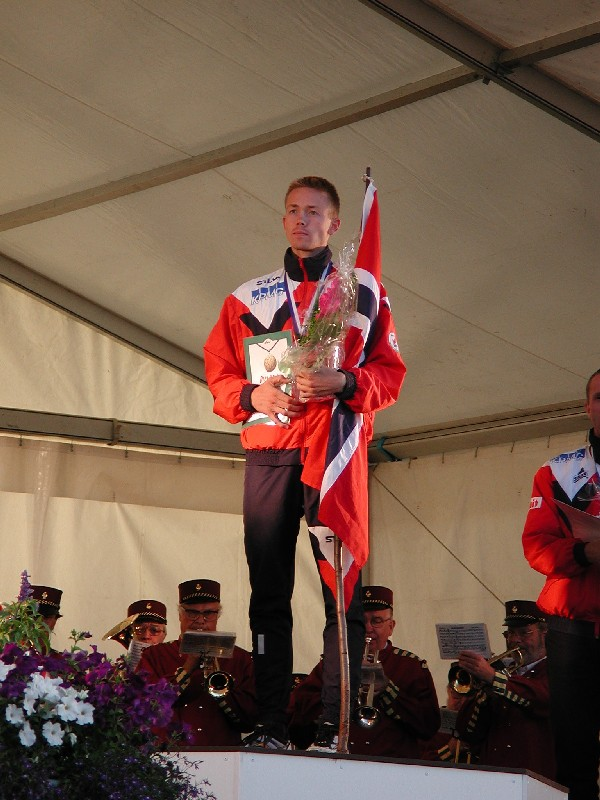
Jørgen Rostrup

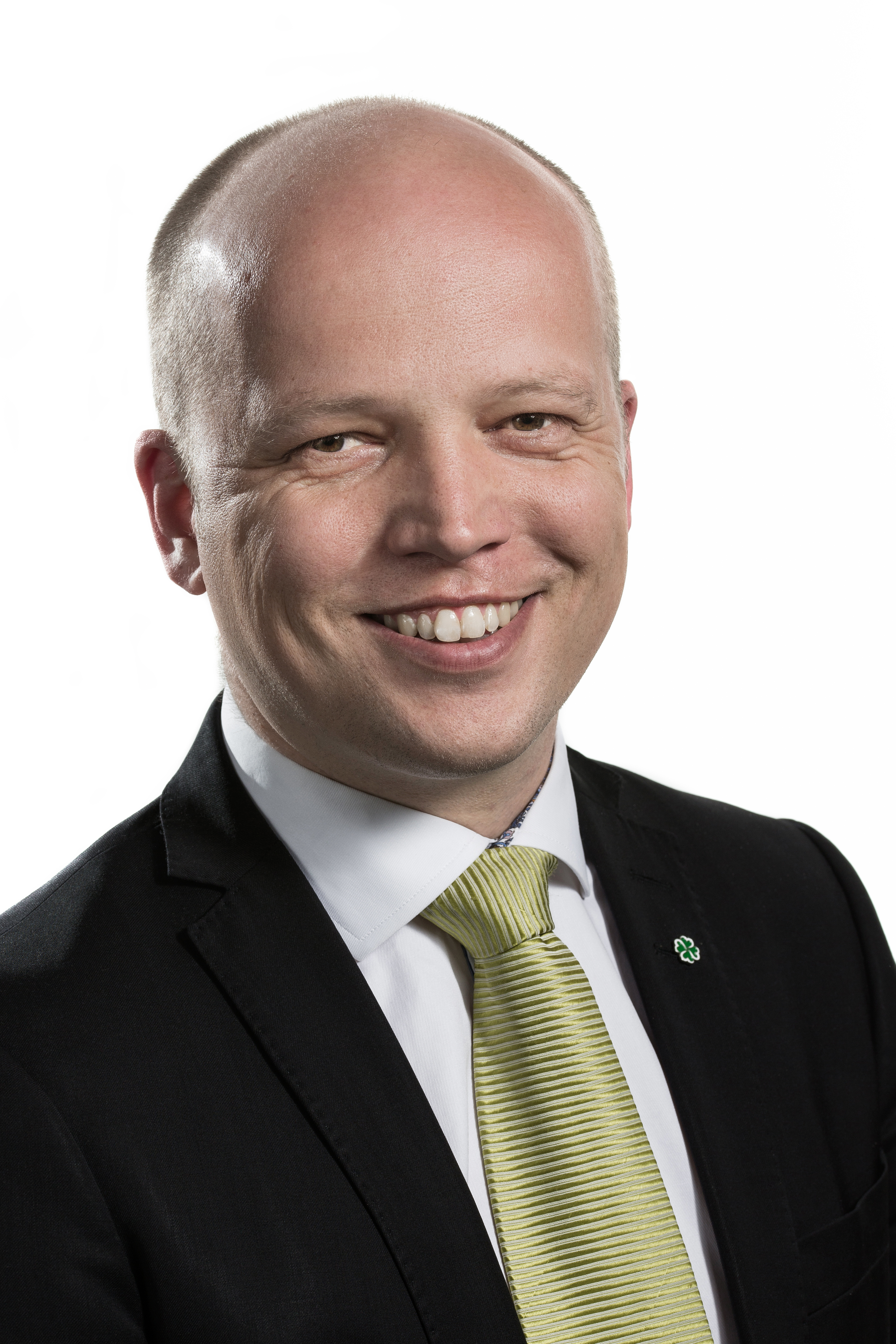
Trygve Slagsvold Vedum, MP, Minister of Agriculture and Food and leader of the Centre Party.

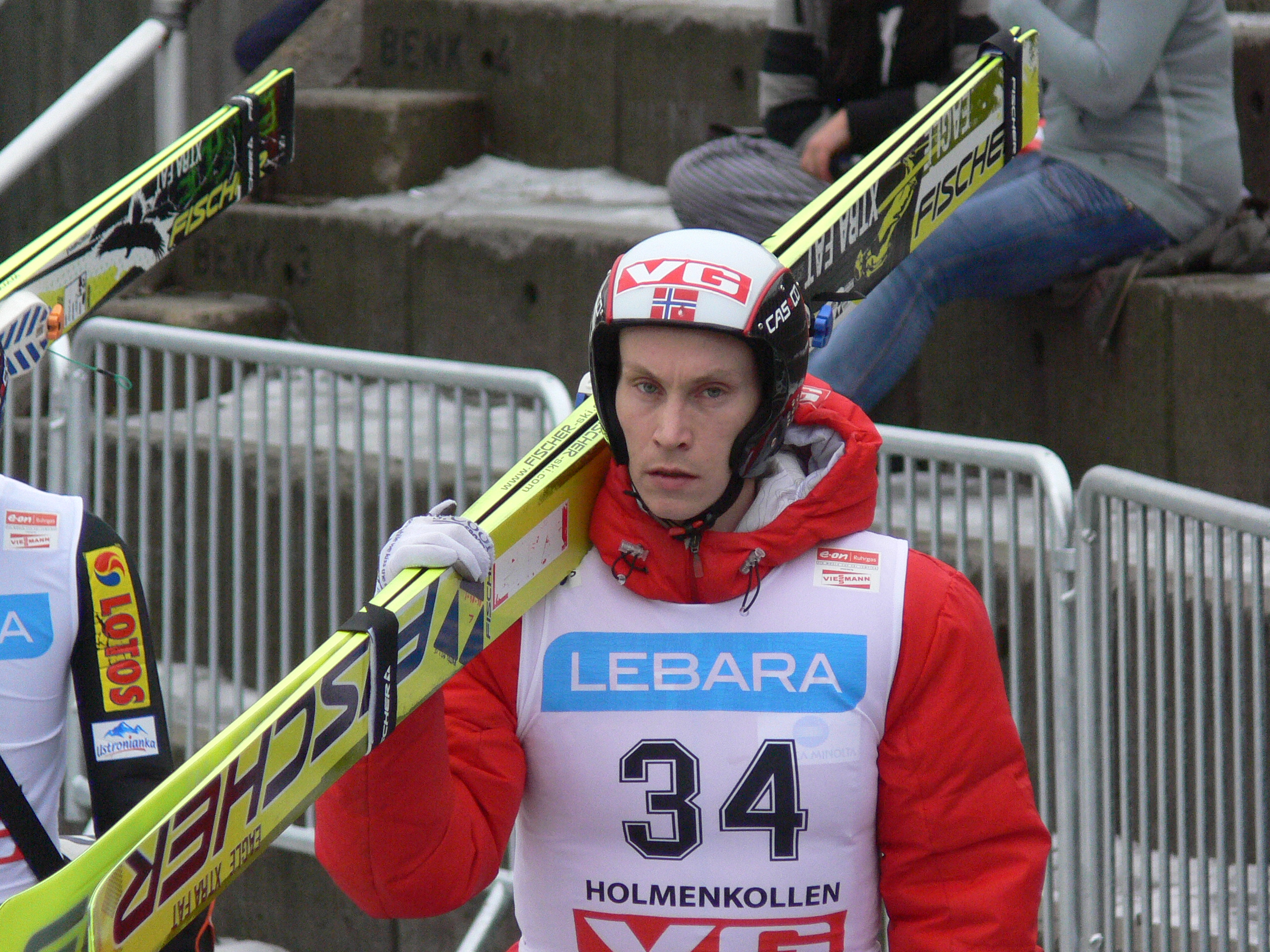
Lars Bystøl
- 3 January – Ronny Thorsen, vocalist
- 4 January – Martin Knudsen, footballer
- 4 January – Stian Ohr, footballer
- 10 January – Kristian Aadnevik, fashion designer
- 10 January – Thomas Finstad, footballer
- 10 January – Astrid Johannessen, footballer
- 17 January – Frode Kippe, footballer
- 17 January – Maria Tryti Vennerød, playwright
- 18 January – Thor Hushovd, cyclist
- 18 January – Terje Skjeldestad, footballer
- 21 January – Inge André Olsen, footballer
- 27 January – Kai Ove Stokkeland, footballer
- 29 January – Yngvar Håkonsen, footballer
- 30 January – Jan Thore Grefstad, singer and songwriter
- 1 February – Anders Hasselgård, footballer
- 9 February – Gro Marit Istad Kristiansen, biathlete
- 11 February – Sigrun Gjerløw Aasland, politician.
- 11 February – Inga Sætre, illustrator and comics writer.
- 12 February – Susanne Wigene, middle- and long-distance runner
- 14 February – Endre Hansen, footballer
- 17 February – Anders Nordberg, orienteering competitor
- 25 February – Kristin Frogner, actress, musician and sculptor
- 25 February – Amund Skiri, footballer
- 1 March – Runar Normann, footballer
- 5 March – Kent Gudmundsen, politician.
- 8 March – Thor Anders Myhren, musician
- 9 March – Marianne Rokne, handballer
- 10 March – Terrie Miller, swimmer
- 13 March – Erlend Fuglum, politician
- 13 March – Gaute Heivoll, poet, novelist, playwright and short story writer
- 21 March – Arnstein Finstad, cross-country skier
- 21 March – Vegard Samdahl, handballer
- 25 March – Alexandra Koefoed, sailor
- 27 March – Marius Bakken, runner
- 27 March – Tom Stenvoll, footballer
- 1 April – Rune Berger, footballer
- 1 April – Tom Harald Hagen, footballer
- 5 April – Arild Stokkan-Grande, politician
- 5 April – Steinar Tenden, footballer
- 6 April – Stig Arild Råket, footballer
- 11 April – Martin Bartnes, ski mountaineer and cross-country skier
- 15 April – Jøran Kallmyr, politician.
- 17 April – Bjørn Dahl, footballer
- 17 April – Arild Sundgot, footballer
- 18 April – Ingrid Berntsen, freestyle skier
- 20 April – Kjetil Norland, footballer
- 23 April – Lorentz Aspen, musician
- 27 April – Knut Dørum Lillebakk, footballer
- 5 May – Ola Gjeilo, composer and pianist
- 6 May – Hilde Lindset, writer
- 12 May – Annette Bjelkevik, speed skater
- 12 May – Aslak Nore, writer.
- 17 May – Christian Berg, footballer
- 17 May – Tor Halvor Bjørnstad, cross-country skier, biathlete and winter triathlete
- 17 May – Mirjam Kristensen, novelist and non-fiction writer
- 28 May – Elin Lerum Boasson, environmentalist
- 12 June – Nikolai Astrup, politician
- 15 June – Hege Christin Vikebø, handballer
- 17 June – Mette Karlsvik, musician
- 19 June – Dagny Mellgren, footballer
- 24 June – Nikolai Eilertsen, bass guitarist
- 28 June – Truls Vasvik, politician.
- 9 July – Birgitte Sættem, handballer
- 19 July – Janne Johannessen, newspaper editor and media executive.
- 20 July – Fritz Aanes, Greco-Roman wrestler
- 26 July – Silvia Moi, opera singer
- 27 July – Vibeke Johansen, swimmer
- 28 July – Torbjørn Røe Isaksen, politician
- 2 August – Hege Bae Nyholt, politician.
- 3 August – Christer Ellefsen, footballer
- 4 August – Siri Nordby, footballer
- 4 August – Per-Åge Skrøder, ice hockey player
- 13 August – Geir Pollestad, politician
- 14 August – Petter Furuseth, footballer
- 17 August – Vibeke Stene, vocalist
- 22 August – Trond Viggo Toresen, footballer
- 26 August – Sveinung Fjeldstad, footballer
- 26 August – Knut Sirevåg, footballer
- 31 August – Morten Qvenild, jazz pianist
- 3 September – Terje Bakken, musician (d. 2004)
- 10 September – Kai Olav Ryen, footballer
- 11 September – Else-Marthe Sørlie Lybekk, handballer.
- 13 September – Peter Sunde, politician
- 14 September – Alexander Aas, footballer
- 16 September – Mads Hansen, ice hockey player
- 16 September – Ane Carmen Roggen, soprano singer
- 16 September – Ida Roggen, jazz singer
- 17 September – Martine Aurdal, journalist and newspaper editor
- 21 September – Jarl André Storbæk, footballer
- 25 September – Jan Egil Andresen, cross-country skier
- 25 September – Frøy Gudbrandsen, journalist and newspaper editor.
- 26 September – Ingfrid Breie Nyhus, pianist
- 26 September – Christoffer Sundby, sailor
- 29 September – Kurt Nilsen, pop/country singer and winner of Idol (Norway season 1) and World Idol
- 3 October – Inger Bråtveit, novelist and children's writer
- 5 October – Steinar Nickelsen, jazz musician
- 10 October – Kenneth Dokken, footballer
- 12 October – Børge-Are Halvorsen, jazz musician
- 14 October – Lars Erik Bartnes, politician
- 14 October – Siril Helljesen, equestrian
- 15 October – Truls Wickholm, politician
- 20 October – Venke Knutson, singer
- 25 October – Camilla Indset Sorgjerd, cyclist
- 26 October – Tarjei Strøm, rock musician
- 27 October – Hugo Mikal Skår, rock musician
- 30 October – Tore Bruvoll, musician
- 3 November – Jonas Howden Sjøvaag, jazz drummer
- 5 November – Jørgen Rostrup, orienteering competitor, world champion.
- 5 November – Marita Røstad, jazz musician
- 6 November – Tarjei Skarlund, beach volleyball player
- 7 November – Line Østvold, snowboarder (d. 2004)
- 9 November – Even Ormestad, bass guitarist
- 10 November – Alexander Refsum Jensenius, researcher and musician
- 12 November – Lars Ivar Moldskred, footballer
- 13 November – Marit Velle Kile, actress
- 16 November – Gyda Ellefsplass Olssen, sport shooter
- 25 November – Alexander Wefald, sprint canoer
- 28 November – Siri Hall Arnøy, politician
- 28 November – Mette Karlsvik, journalist
- 28 November – Petar Rnkovic, footballer
- 1 December – Trygve Slagsvold Vedum, politician
- 4 December – Lars Bystøl, ski jumper
- 7 December – Kristofer Hivju, film actor, producer, and writer
- 12 December – Lage Lund, jazz musician
- 13 December – Kristin Lie, footballer
- 25 December – Camilla Holth, curler
- 30 December – Julie Dahle Aagård, jazz musician

=== Full date missing ===
- Bjørnar Andersen, dog musher
- Trond Frønes, musician
- Ray Kay, photographer

== Notable deaths ==
=== January to March ===
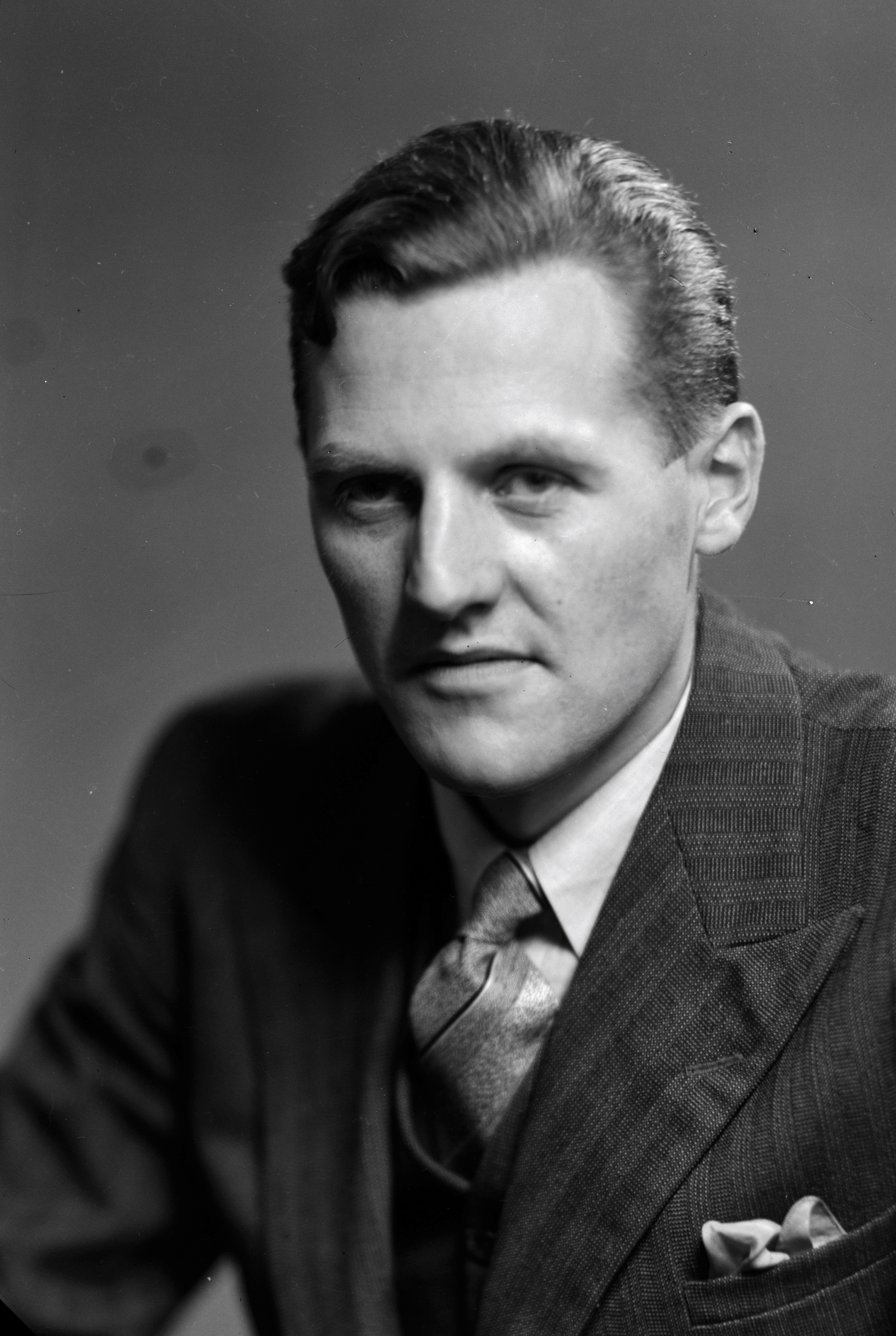
John Lyng

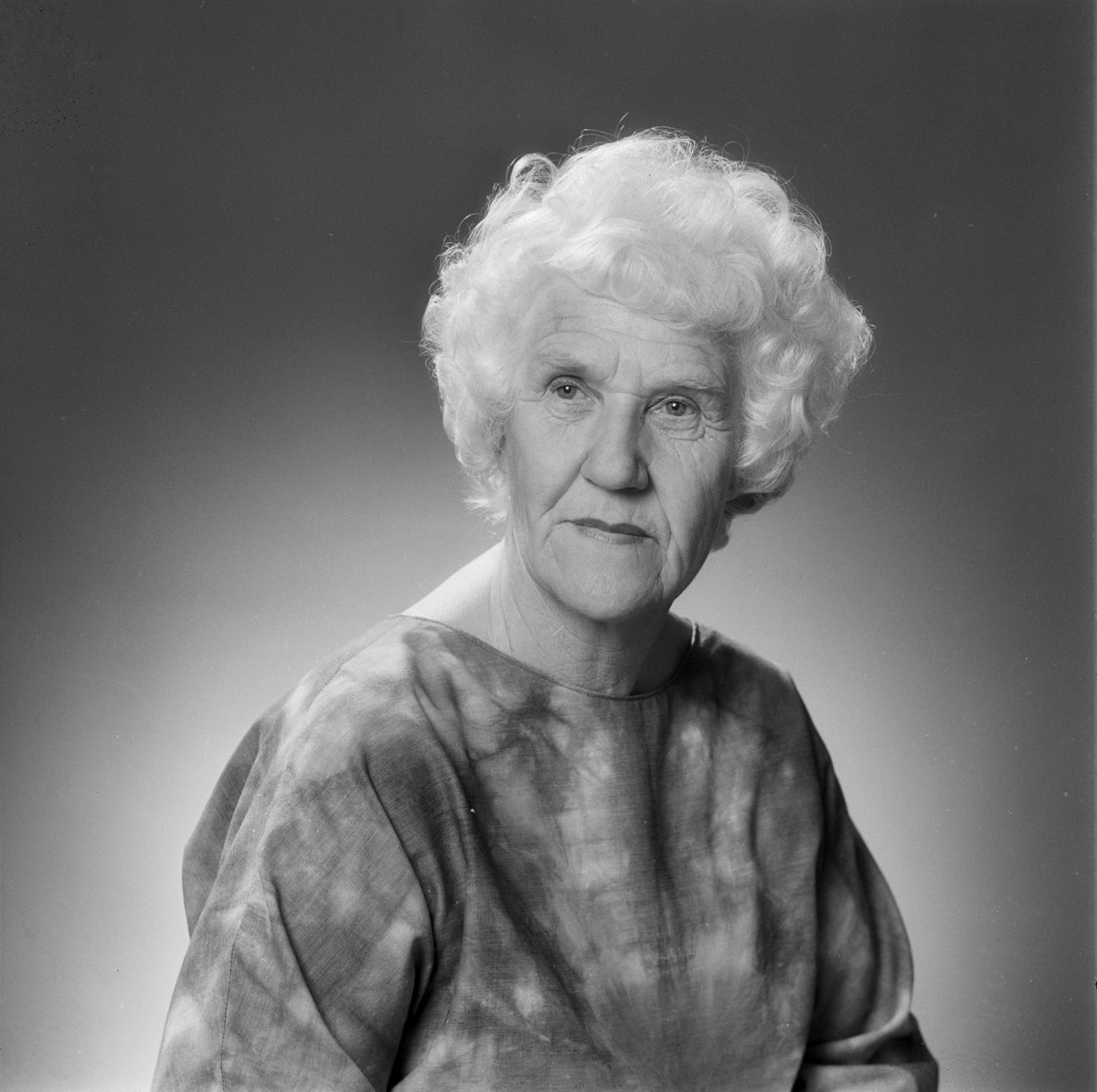
Ragna Thiis Stang

- 16 January – Otto Dahl, politician (b. 1914)
- 16 January – Svein Helling, sport shooter (b. 1910)
- 18 January – John Lyng, barrister and politician (b. 1905).
- 21 January – Olav Sundal, gymnast and Olympic silver medallist (b.1899).
- 27 January – Ernst Gervin, magazine editor (b. 1908)
- 27 January – Alf Konningen, alpine skier (b. 1901)
- 4 February – Fanny Elsta, opera singer (b. 1899)
- 14 February – Anders Hove, politician (b. 1885)
- 19 February – Olaf Ditlev-Simonsen, sailor and Olympic silver medallist, footballer, sports administrator and businessman (b. 1897).
- 21 February – Raoul Heide, fencer (b. 1888).
- 3 March – Georg Morgenstierne, linguist (b. 1892)
- 13 March – Kaare Bache, triple jumper (b. 1888).
- 13 March – Ottar Wicklund, actor (b. 1911)
- 19 March – Reidar Lund, cinematographer (b. 1897)
- 24 March – Just Lippe, journalist and politician (b. 1904)
- 27 March – Sverre Farstad, speed skater and Olympic gold medallist (b.1920)
- 29 March – Ragna Thiis Stang, historian and museum administrator (b. 1909).

=== April to June ===
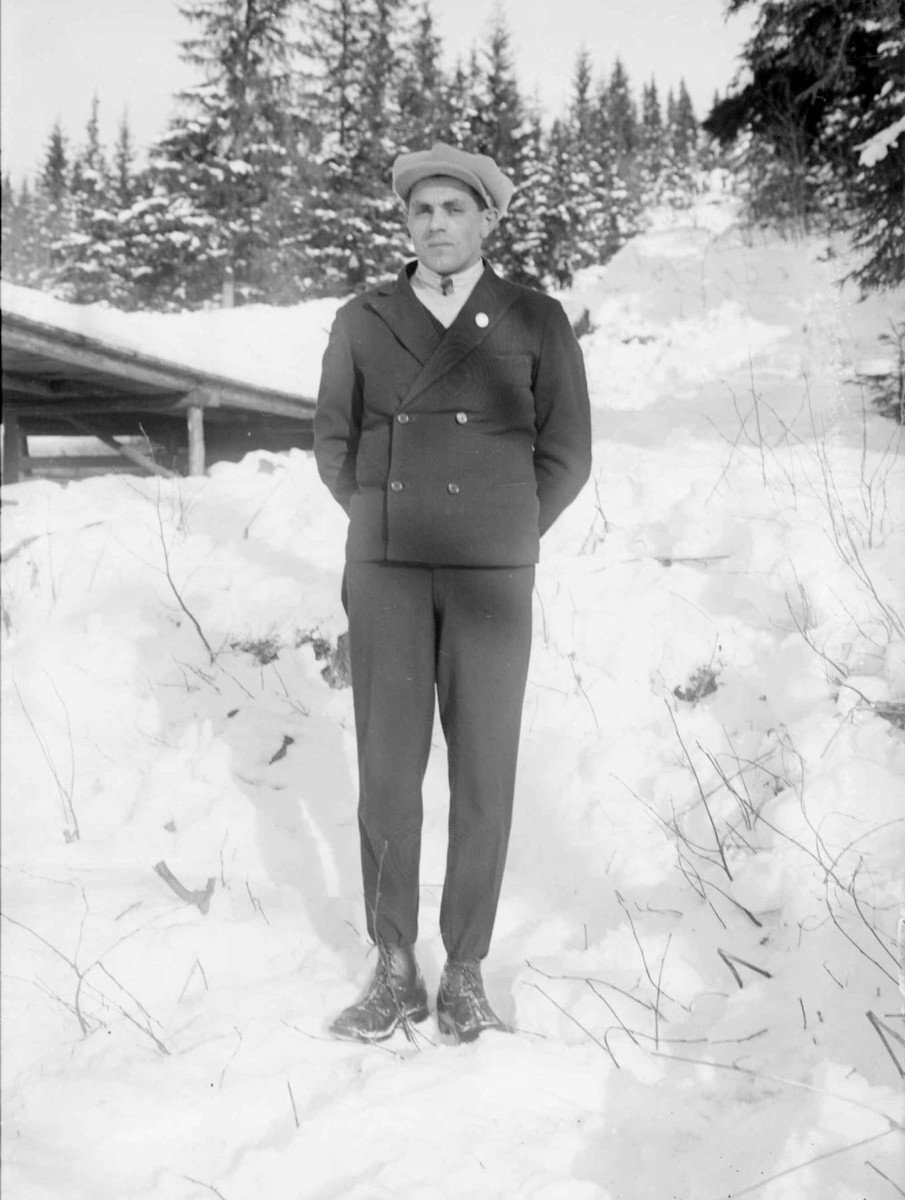
Arne Rustadstuen
- 1 April – Olaf Nygaard, cyclist (b. 1894)
- 18 April – Alex Brinchmann, children's physician and songwriter, novelist, playwright and crime writer (b. 1888).
- 19 April – Nils Lie, writer, literary consultant and translator (born 1902).
- 25 April – Arne Rustadstuen, Nordic skier, Olympic bronze medallist and World Champion (b.1905)
- 4 May – Kolbjørn Fjeld, librarian and publisher (born 1901).
- 8 May – Klara Amalie Skoglund, politician (b.1891)
- 9 May – Halvor Bunkholt, politician (b.1903)
- 20 May – Bjarne Brustad, composer and violinist (b. 1895).
- 4 June – Ingolf Rogde, actor (b. 1911)
- 9 June – Odd Erling Melsom, military officer and newspaper editor (b. 1900)
- 17 June – Niels Onstad, ship owner and art collector (b. 1909)
- 18 June – Harald Normann, military officer and non-fiction writer (b. 1893).

=== July to September ===
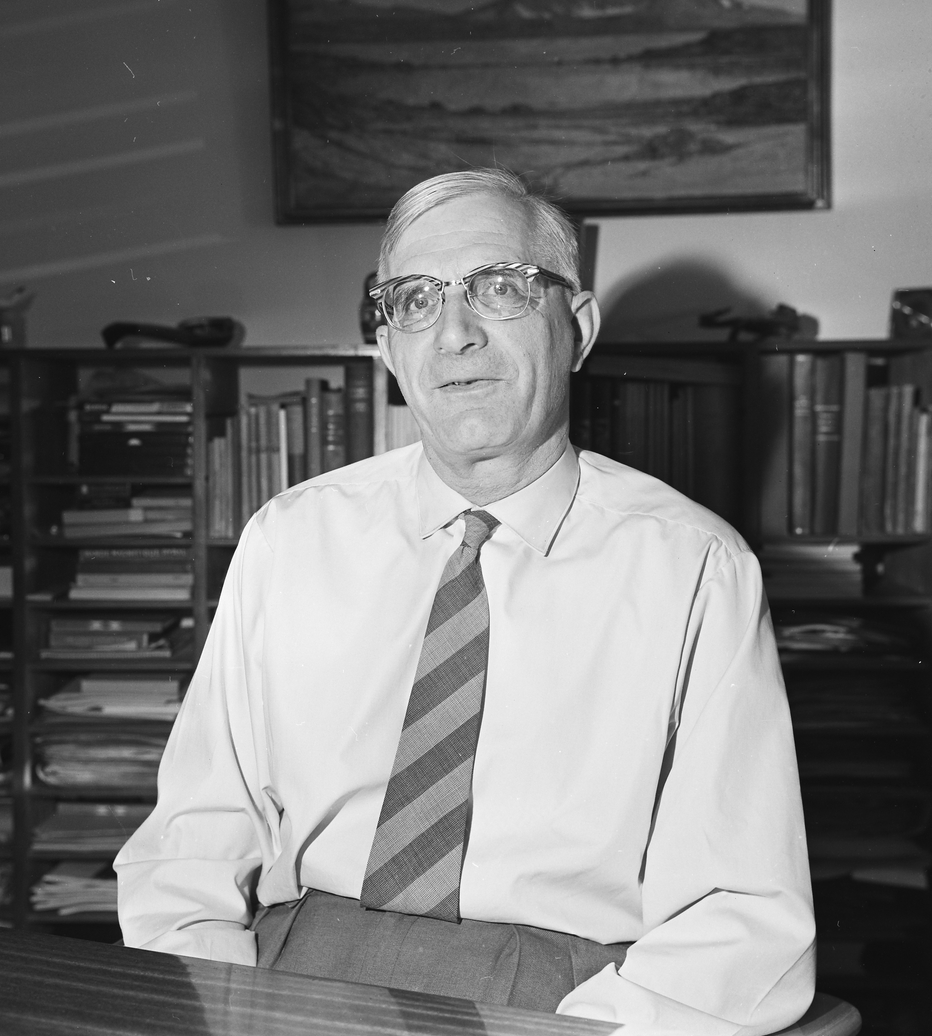
Vebjørn Tandberg

- 3 July – Syvert Tobiassen Messel, politician (b.1897)
- 3 July – Sigrid Stray, barrister (b. 1893)
- 27 July – Henrik Friis Robberstad, politician (b.1901)
- 31 July – Ørnulf Egge, politician and resistance member (b. 1910)
- 3 August – Einar Wilhelms, footballer (b. 1895).
- 15 August – Viggo Brun, mathematician (b.1885)
- 15 August – Hartvig Kiran, poet and radio personality (b. 1911).
- 16 August – Henry Olsen, track and field athlete (b.1887)
- 30 August – Vebjørn Tandberg, businessperson and industrialist (b.1904)
- 6 September – Ketil Askildt, discus thrower (b. 1900)
- 8 September – Borghild Hammerich, philanthropist (b. 1901).
- 30 September – Eiliv Skard, classical philologist (b. 1898).

=== October to December ===
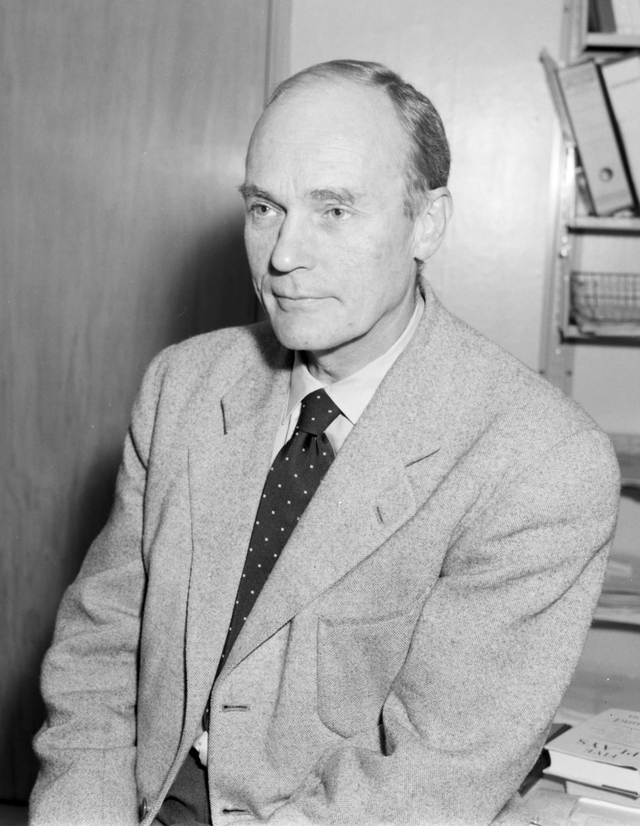
Hans Heiberg

- 2 October – Sjur Johnsen, wrestler (b. 1891).
- 15 October – Rolf Stenersen, track and field athlete, businessman, art collector, non-fiction writer, essayist, novelist, playwright and biographer (b. 1899).
- 17 October – Robert Giertsen, sailor (b. 1894)
- 17 October – Sigurd Evensmo, author and journalist (b.1912).
- 26 October – Rolf Schjerven, politician (b.1918)
- 1 November – Arne Paasche Aasen, politician, journalist and poet (b. 1901)
- 13 November – Liv Tomter, politician (b.1901)
- 4 December – Tancred Ibsen, officer, pilot, film director and screenwriter (b.1893)
- 4 December – Sverre Nordby, footballer (b. 1910)
- 6 December – Hans Heiberg, journalist, literary critic, theatre critic, essayist, novelist, playwright, translator and theatre director (b. 1904).
- 10 December – Kirsten Sinding-Larsen, architect (b. 1898)
- 31 December – Arne Gjedrem, politician (b.1890)

=== Full date missing ===
- Aslak Brekke, folksinger (b.1901)
- Reidar Kjellberg, art historian (b.1904)
- Kåre Kvisli, jurist and civil servant (b. 1903)
- Aagot Nissen, actress (b. 1882)
- Marius Nygaard, judge (b. 1902)
- Margrete Aamot Øverland, resistance member (b.1913)
- Erik T. Poulsson, judge (b. 1897)
- Lita Prahl, actress and costume designer (b. 1905)
- Carl Søyland, newspaper editor (b.1894)
