= Ingimundr =

Ingimundr, Ingimundur, Ingimund, and Ingemund may refer to:

- Assassination of Ingimundr, the death of a Norwegian claimant to the Kingdom of the Isles
- Ingemund Bengtsson (1919–2000), Swedish politician
- Ingemund Fænn (1907–1987), Norwegian newspaper editor
- Ingimundr (tenth century), Norse warlord in the Irish Sea region
- Ingimundur Ingimundarson (born 1980), Icelandic athlete
