= Hestnes (surname) =

Hestnes is a surname. Notable people with the surname include:

- Egil Hestnes (born 1943), Norwegian politician
- Jonas Hestnes (1869–1926), Norwegian newspaper editor and politician

== See also ==
- Hestenes
