= Torry Pedersen =

Norwegian newspaper editor (born 1957)

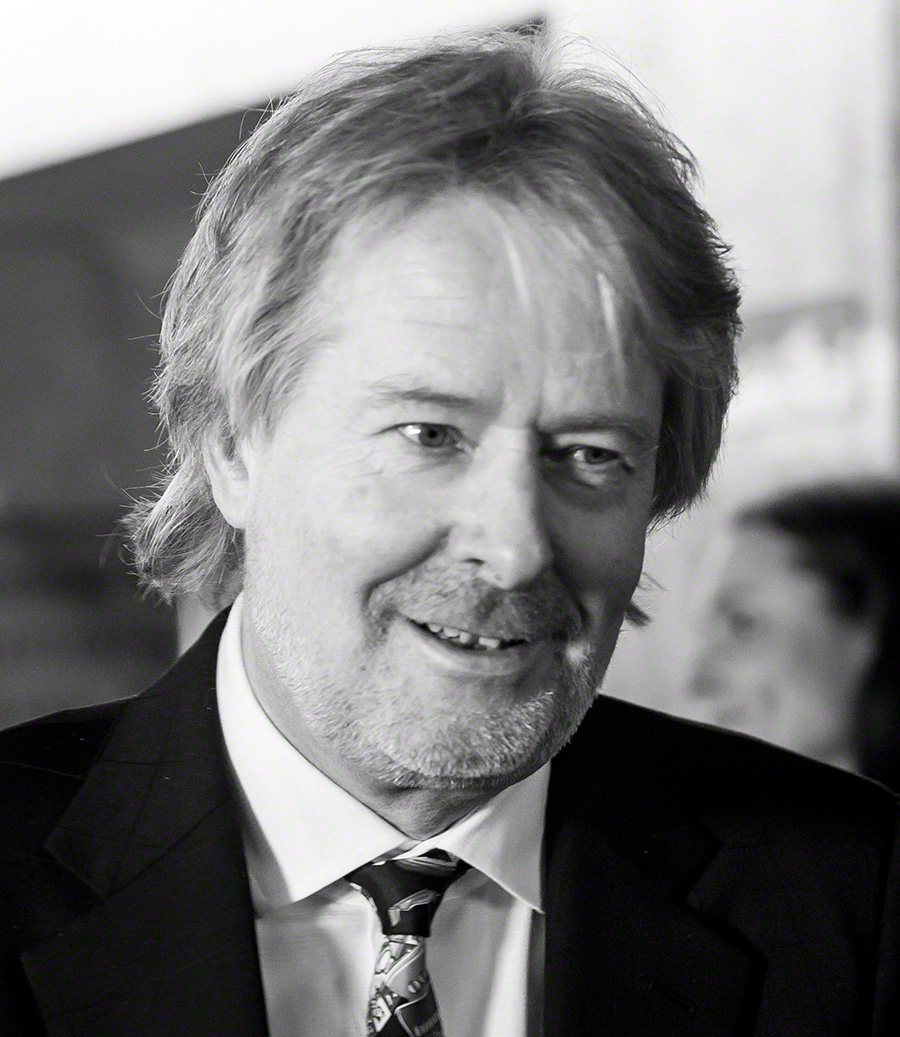
Pedersen in 2016

Torry Pedersen (born 28 September 1957) is a Norwegian newspaper editor and media executive.

Educated in economics from the BI Norwegian Business School, he started his journalist career in Fredriksstad Blad. He later worked in Dagbladet before being hired in Verdens Gang (VG). He was the chief executive of their website, VG Nett, from 2000 to 2008. From 2008 he was the chief executive of VG, and from March 2011 he is also editor-in-chief of VG. In 2017 he became director of publishing at the Schibsted media group, where he has later been a special advisor.

He resides in Vollen.

Media offices
Preceded by Bernt Olufsen	Chief editor of Verdens Gang; 2011–2017	Succeeded by Gard Steiro
