= Espen Egil Hansen =

Norwegian newspaper editor and publisher (born 1965)

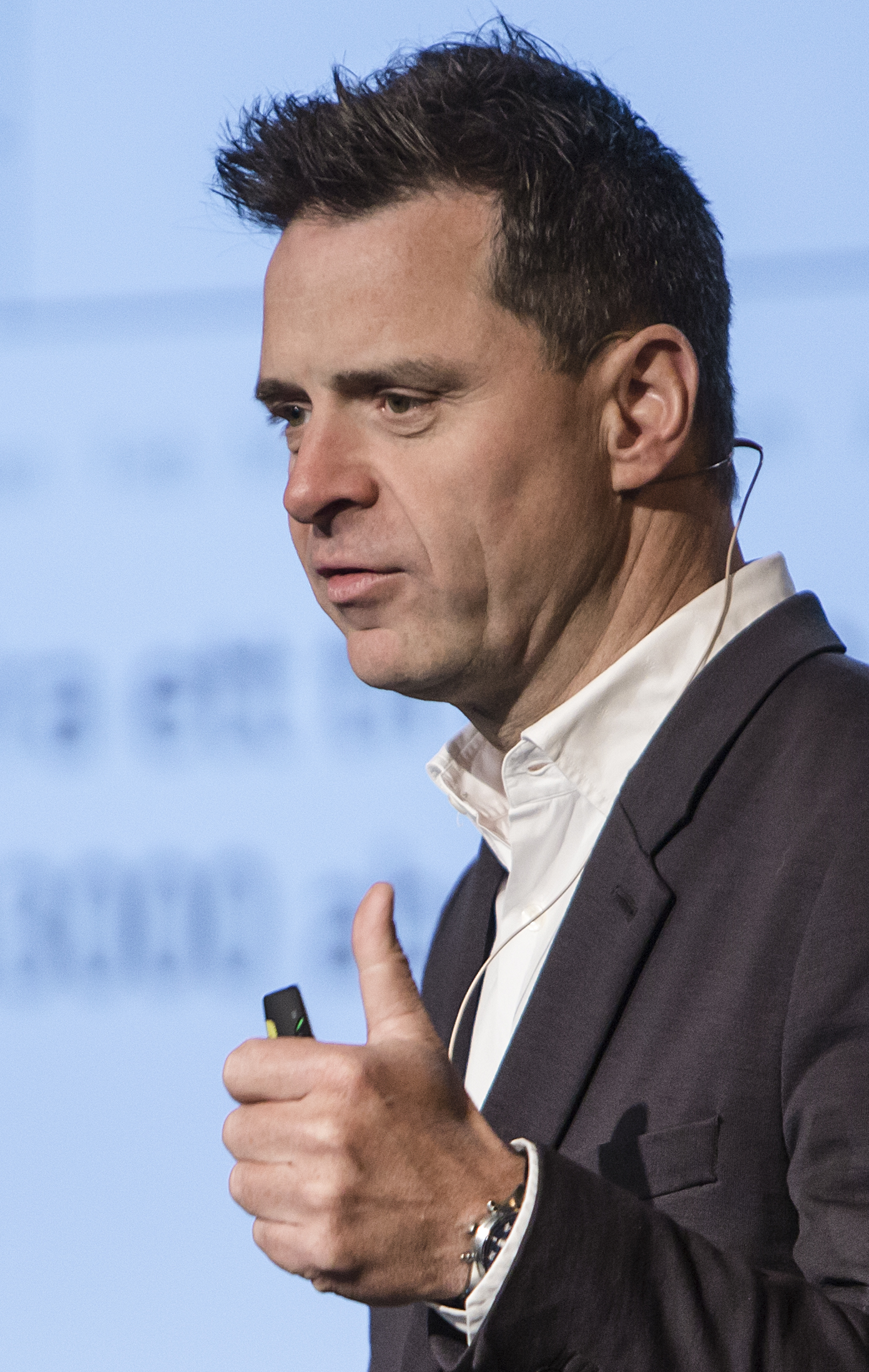
- Born: 16 October 1965 (age 60); Grimstad, Norway
- Occupations: journalist, newspaper editor and publisher

Espen Egil Hansen (born 16 October 1965) is a Norwegian newspaper editor and publisher.

== Biography ==
Hansen was born in Grimstad on 16 October 1965.

He was assigned with the newspaper Verdens Gang from 1991 to 2013. In 2013 he was appointed editor-in-chief of the newspaper Aftenposten, and from 2015 also CEO of the newspaper. He has been board member of the Association of Norwegian Editors, board member of the International News Media Association, and chairman of the board of the online business newspaper E24.

He was succeeded by Trine Eilertsen as chief editor of Aftenposten from January 2020. From 2020 to 2021 he was in charge of digital media strategy for the Schibsted Media Group. From 2021 he was assigned as councillor for the Danish media company JP/Politiken Media Group.

Media offices
Preceded by Hilde Haugsgjerd	Chief editor of Aftenposten; 2013–2020	Succeeded by Trine Eilertsen
