= Hjertenes =

Hjertenes is a Norwegian surname. Notable people with the surname include:

- Dagfinn Hjertenes (1943–2006), Norwegian politician
- Øyulf Hjertenes (born 1979), Norwegian economist, journalist, and newspaper editor
