= Vértex Vinter =

Swedish ski mountaineering competition

Vértex Vinter was a Swedish ski mountaineering competition, now discontinued, that took place in 2005–2011 in different winter sport locations.

== Venues and events ==
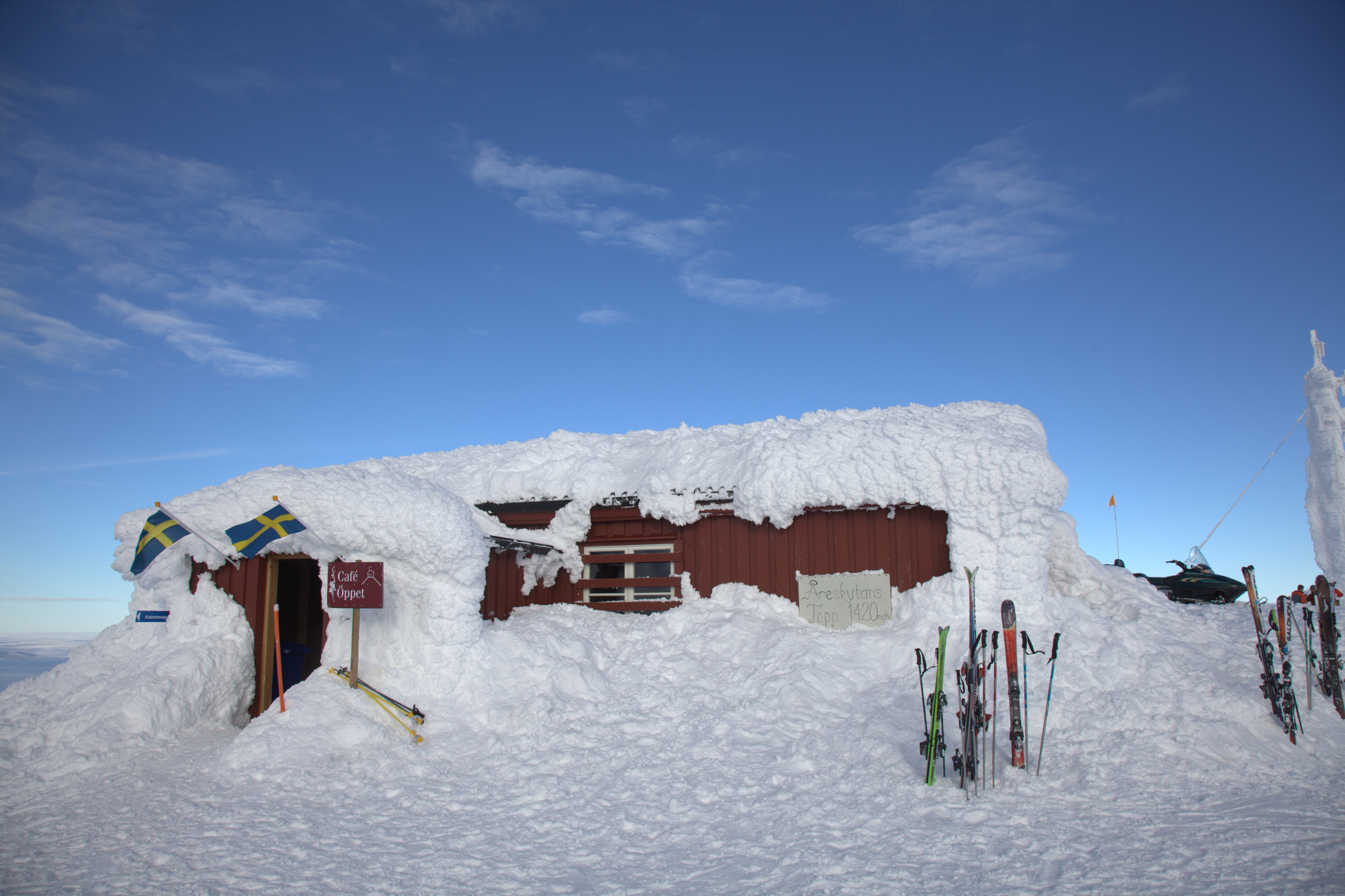
House on top of Mount Åreskutan, the venue for the Vértex Vinter events in 2007–2009

In 2004–2006 the venue was Storulvån in the Åre Ski Area, in 2007–2009 in Åre proper and in 2010–2011 in Sylarna. There were two separate events; in 2004–2009 and in 2011 there was a solo event for single competitors and in 2004–2010 a duo event for teams of two. In addition to the elite level events various additional events have been held from time to time, such as snowshoe races and shorter beginners' races.

== Competition results ==
Year	Solo		Duo		
Year	Men	Women	Men	Women	Mixed
2004	Ola Herje Hovdenak	Ingrid Stengård	Per Vestling; Patrik Moris	Hanna Wikberg; Josefina Wikberg	Arvid Björkroth; Ingrid Stengård
2005	Ola Berger	Hanna Wikberg	Björn Rydvall; Johan Henriksson	Jenny Hansson; Emelie Öhrstig	Mikael Andersson; Hanna Wikberg
2006	Ola Berger	Benita Lundgren	Patrik Moris; Per Vestling	Åsa Andersson; Josefin Janling	Benita Lundgren; Bård Smestad
2007	Ola Berger	Marit Tveite Bystøl	Joakim Halvarsson; John Bergstedt	Bodil Ryste; Marit Tveite Bystøl	Kicki Fransson; Patrik Fransson
2008	Ola Berger	Josefina Wikberg	Ola Herje Hovdenak; Ola Berger	Martina Höök; Josefina Wikberg	Ingrid Stengård; Fredrik Sätter
2009	Ola Berger	Mari Fasting	Ola Berger; Ove Erik Tronvoll	-	Alexandra Loefvander; Per Fredriksson
2010	-	-	André Jonsson; Björn Gund	Josefina Wikberg; Martina Höök	Ingrid Stengård; Jonas Danvind
2011	Ola Berger	Josefina Wikberg	-	-	-

The Norwegian ski mountaineer Ola Berger won the solo event six times and the men's duo event twice. The Swedish adventure racer and ski mountaineer Josefina Wikberg won the solo event twice and the women's duo event three times.
