= Steiro =

Steiro is a surname. Notable people with the surname include:

- Gard Steiro (born 1976), Norwegian journalist and newspaper editor
- Iselin Steiro (born 1985), Norwegian model
