= Trond Olav Skrunes =

Norwegian newspaper editor

- Born: 6 September 1974 (age 51); Tysvær Municipality, Norway
- Education: University of Bergen
- Occupations: Journalist and newspaper editor
- Employer: Bergens Tidende

Trond Olav Skrunes (born 6 September 1974) is a Norwegian journalist and newspaper editor. Since 2024 he has been chief editor of the newspaper Bergens Tidende.

== Career ==
Born in Tysvær Municipality on 6 September 1974, Skrunes graduated as cand.mag. from the University of Bergen in 1999.

He was journalist for Bergensavisen from 2006 to 2008. He was appointed as political journalist in the newspaper Bergens Tidende from 2008. From 2017 to 2020 he was news leader in Verdens Gang. Serving as news editor of Bergens Tidende from 2020 to 2023, he was appointed chief editor of the newspaper from 2024, taking over from Frøy Gudbrandsen.

Media offices
Preceded by Frøy Gudbrandsen	Chief editor of Bergens Tidende; 2024–present	Incumbent
