= Vennerød =

Vennerød is a Norwegian surname. Notable people with the surname include:

- Maria Tryti Vennerød (born 1978), Norwegian playwright
- Øyvind Vennerød (1919–1991), Norwegian film director
- Petter Vennerød (1948–2021), Norwegian film director
