= Hestenes =

Hestenes is a surname. Notable people with the surname include:

- Arne Hestenes (1920–1995), Norwegian journalist
- David Hestenes (born 1933), American theoretical physicist and science educator
- Magnus Hestenes (1906–1991), American mathematician
- Ola M. Hestenes (1919–2008), Norwegian politician
- Olav Hestenes (1930–1996), Norwegian barrister
