= Dalen Portland =

Dalen Portland may refer to:

- Dalen Portland (novel), a 1978 novel by Kjartan Fløgstad
- Dalen Portland Cementfabrikk, now Norcem Brevik
