= Bernt Olufsen =

Norwegian newspaper editor

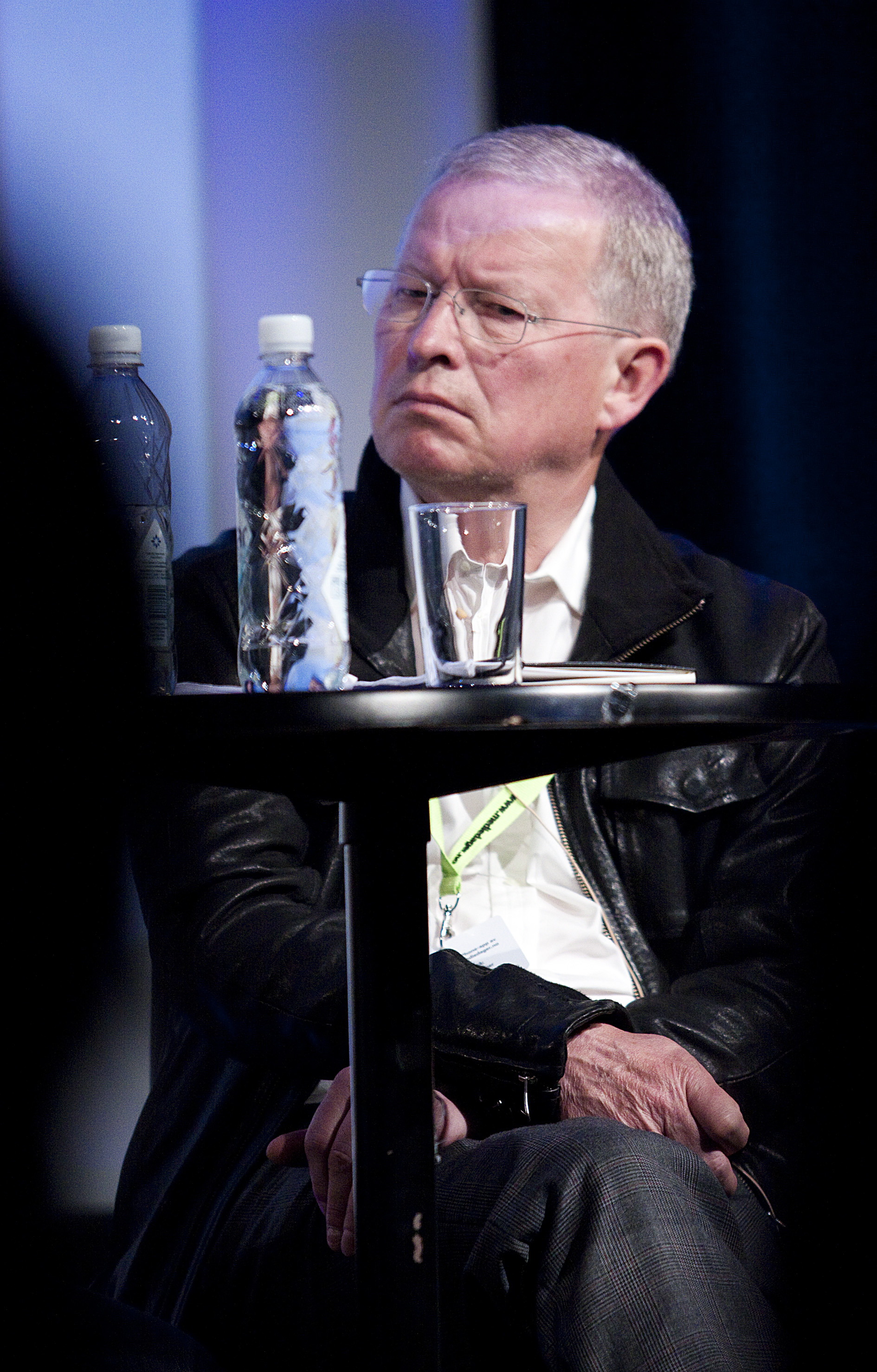
Bernt Olufsen, 2010.

Bernt Olufsen (born 11 February 1954), is a Norwegian newspaper editor.

He was born in Trondheim. He worked in Adresseavisen from 1975 to 1979, and was then employed in Verdens Gang (VG). After a period as subeditor he was promoted to editor in 1989, and was their editor-in-chief from 1994 to 2011. He was then hired as an editor in Schibsted.

He has also been a board member of the Norwegian Union of Journalists from 1983 to 1986 and the Association of Norwegian Editors from 1995 to 1999. From 2013 he has chaired Polaris Media.

Media offices
Preceded by Einar Hanseid	Chief editor of Verdens Gang; 1994–2011	Succeeded by Torry Pedersen
