= Bergens Tidende =

Norway's fifth-largest newspaper

- Type: Daily newspaper
- Format: Tabloid
- Owner(s): Schibsted (99.999%); J. W. Eides Stiftelse (0.001%)
- Editor: Trond Olav Skrunes
- Founded: 2 January 1868; 158 years ago
- Political alignment: None officially (traditionally Liberal)
- Language: Norwegian (Bokmål and Nynorsk)
- Headquarters: Bergen, Norway
- ISSN: 0804-8983 (print); 1500-7618 (web)
- OCLC number: 49229316
- Website: www.bt.no

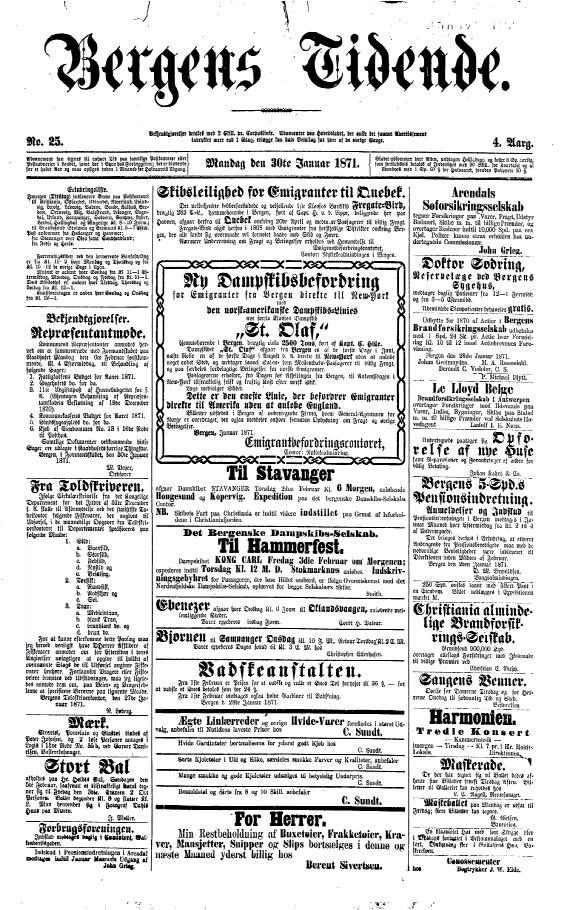
Bergens Tidende 30 January 1870.

Bergens Tidende is Norway's fifth-largest newspaper, and the country's largest newspaper outside Oslo.

Bergens Tidende is owned by the public company Schibsted ASA. Norwegian owners held a mere 42% of the shares in Schibsted at the end of 2015.

== History and profile ==
Founded in 1868, Bergens Tidende is based in Bergen. The newspaper is published in two sections. Section one contains op-eds, general news, sports, and weather. Section two contains culture, views, local news, and television listings. The feature magazine BTMagasinet is published on Saturdays.

Bergens Tidende is owned by the public company Schibsted, which also owns Aftenposten, Stavanger Aftenblad, and Fædrelandsvennen. At least 30% of the shares of Schibsted are owned by foreign investment banks and insurance companies, such as Goldman Sachs. The paper began to be published in tabloid format in 2006.

The paper was awarded the European Newspaper of the Year in the regional newspaper category by the European Newspapers Congress in 2011.

In 2005, Bergens Tidende reached about 260,000 readers every day, mainly in the county of Vestland. Circulation numbers peaked at 100,000 copies in 1988. Its circulation was about 87,000 copies in 2007. In 2008, the paper had a circulation of 85,825 copies, and later dropped to 70,220 copies by 2015.

== Website ==
The website of Bergens Tidende is bt.no. Until 2009, the newspaper broadcast on BTV (formerly TV Hordaland), but service was taken off air and incorporated into bt.no.

== List of editors-in-chief ==
- Edvard Larssen, Jan - Apr 1868
- Johan Hekleberg, 1868–1869
- David Chrystie Habe, 1869–1871
- Olav Lofthus, 1872–1894
- Finn Bøgh Henriksen, 1894–1902
- K. F. Dahl, 1902–1903
- Finn Bøgh Henriksen, 1903–1942
- Vidkunn Nitter Schreiner, 1942–1945
- Håkon Torsvik, 1945–1956
- Ingemund Fænn, 1956–1977
- Kjartan Rødland, 1977–1986
- Einar Eriksen, 1986–1991
- Magne Gaasemyr, 1991–1994
- Hans Erik Matre, 1994–1997
- Einar Hålien, 1997–2008
- Trine Eilertsen, 2008–2012
- Gard Steiro, 2012–2015
- Øyulf Hjertenes, 2015–2019
- Frøy Gudbrandsen, 2019–2023
- Trond Olav Skrunes, 2024–present
