= Kåre Kvisli =

Norwegian jurist and civil servant

Kåre Heming Kvisli (1903–1978) was a Norwegian jurist and civil servant.

== Biography ==
He graduated with the cand.jur. degree in 1928. In 1931 he was hired in the Ministry of Finance. He advanced to assistant secretary in 1945, having held the position on a non-permanent basis from 1941. During the Second World War he helped prepare the Norwegian post-war economy, as a member of a group together with Gunnar Jahn, Nicolai Rygg, Erling Petersen—and later Wilhelm Thagaard and Knut Getz Wold.

In 1946 he was promoted to deputy under-secretary of state, replacing the deceased William Kent. He held this position until 1973. He was succeeded by Ole Kalgaard. Kvisli was noted as being a strong personality and civil servant, especially under the period when Friedrich Georg Nissen was permanent under-secretary of state, and thus Kvisli's nominal superior. Also, Kvisli strongly preferred to stay out of open conflicts.

Kvisli also lectured in tax law at the University of Oslo, and released the book Innføring i skatteretten ('Introduction to the Tax Law') in 1962.
