= Frøy Gudbrandsen =

Norwegian newspaper editor

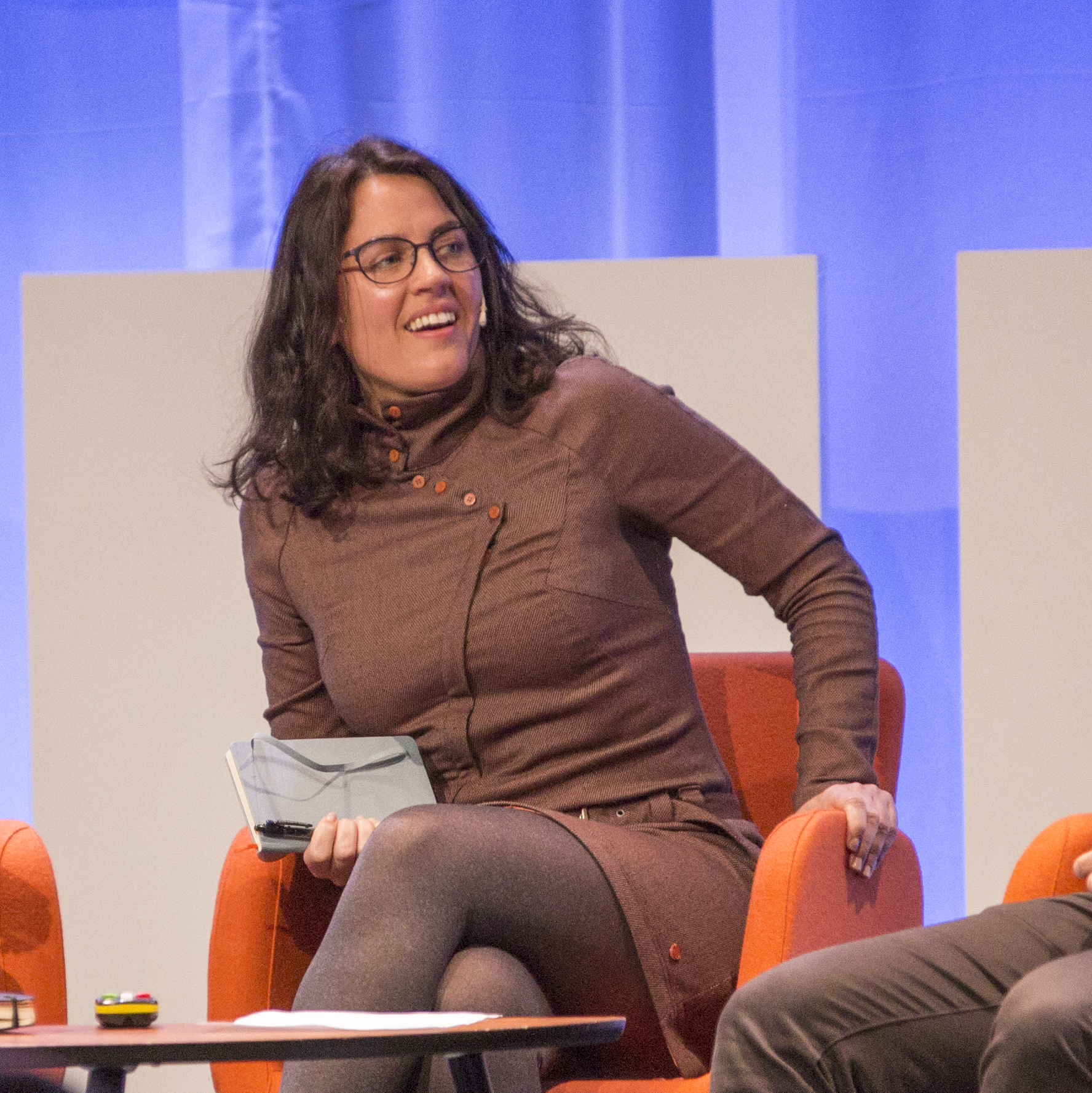
- Born: 25 September 1978 (age 48); Drammen, Norway
- Education: University of Sheffield; University of Bergen
- Occupations: Journalist and newspaper editor
- Employer(s): Bergens Tidende; Verdens Gang

Frøy Gudbrandsen (born 25 September 1978) is a Norwegian journalist and newspaper editor. From 2019 to 2023 she was the chief editor of the newspaper Bergens Tidende. Since 2023 she has been political editor for the newspaper Verdens Gang.

== Career ==
Born in Drammen on 25 September 1978, Gudbrandsen graduated with a bachelor's degree in journalism from the University of Sheffield in 2000. In 2012 she graduated with a PhD degree in Comparative politics from the University of Bergen. Her dr. thesis was titled Explaining Scandinavian Immigration Policy 1985–2010.

She was appointed as political commentator in the newspaper Bergens Tidende in 2012. Serving as political editor from 2015, she was appointed chief editor of the newspaper from 2019, taking over from Øyulf Hjertenes.

In December 2023 she was appointed political editor for the newspaper Verdens Gang.

Media offices
Preceded by Øyulf Hjertenes	Chief editor of Bergens Tidende; 2019–2023	Succeeded by Trond Olav Skrunes
