= Kjartan Rødland =

Norwegian journalist and newspaper editor (1938–2025

- Born: 29 November 1938; Bolstadøyri, Norway
- Died: 27 February 2025 (aged 86)
- Occupations: Journalist and newspaper editor
- Awards: King's Medal of Merit (2012)

Kjartan Rødland (29 November 1938 – 27 February 2025) was a Norwegian journalist and newspaper editor, and author of several books. He was chief editor of the newspaper Bergens Tidende from 1977 to 1986.

== Life and career ==
Rødland was born in the village of Bolstadøyri in Voss Municipality. He started working as journalist from 1956, first in the newspaper Dagen, and then in Raumnes from 1957. He worked for the Bodø newspaper Nordlands Framtid from 1960 to 1963, for Helgeland Arbeiderblad from 1963 to 1967, for Fædrelandsvennen in Kristiansand from 1967 to 1969, and for Bergens Tidende from 1969 to 1971. From 1972 to 1977 he was appointed head of the communications department in Bergen Municipality. He was chief editor of the newspaper Bergens Tidende from 1977 to 1986. He has written more than thirty books, mostly on regional issues.

Rødland was awarded the King's Medal of Merit in 2012.

Rødland died on 27 February 2025, at the age of 86.

Media offices
Preceded by Ingemund Fænn	Chief editor of Bergens Tidende; 1977–1986	Succeeded by Einar Eriksen
