= Einar Eriksen =

Norwegian newspaper editor (1933–2021)

Einar Eriksen (4 March 1933 – 16 January 2021) was a Norwegian newspaper editor.

== Biography ==
He was born in Bergen. He worked in Os- og Fanaposten from 1952, and was hired in Bergens Tidende in 1955. He was awarded the Narvesen Prize in 1964. He advanced to subeditor in 1978 and news editor in 1981, and was editor-in-chief from 1986 to 1991.

Awards
| Preceded by Arne Hestenes | Recipient of the Narvesen Prize; 1964 | Succeeded by Erik Bye |
Media offices
| Preceded by Kjartan Rødland | Chief editor of Bergens Tidende; 1986–1991 | Succeeded by Magne Gaasemyr |
