= William Kent (jurist) =

Norwegian jurist and civil servant

William Kent (1881/82–1946) was a Norwegian jurist and civil servant.

From 1934 to his death in 1946, he served as a deputy under-secretary of state in the Norwegian Ministry of Finance. He was also a deputy board member of Statsøkonomisk Forening. His obituary in Verdens Gang noted that he was a "very prominent man in the central administration", and one of Norway's "foremost experts on tax law". He was replaced as deputy under-secretary of state by Kåre Kvisli.
