= Ola Berger =

Norwegian ski mountaineer and cross-country skier

Personal information
- Nationality: Norway
- Born: 15 March 1979 (age 47) Trondheim, Norway

Sport
- Sport: Skiing
- Club: Byåsen IL

World Cup career
- Seasons: 1 – (2004)
- Indiv. starts: 2
- Indiv. podiums: 0
- Team starts: 0
- Overall titles: 0
- Discipline titles: 0

Ola Berger (born 15 March 1979) is a Norwegian ski mountaineer and cross-country skier.

Berger was born in Trondheim. He started ski mountaineering in 1997 and competed first in 2006. He studied at Norwegian University of Science and Technology. He is related to the orienteer and ski mountaineer Mari Fasting.

Between 2004 and 2011 Berger won the Vértex Vinter solo event six times and the duo event twice.

== Selected results ==
- 2006:
  - 2nd, Oppdal race
  - 6th, Norwegian Championship
- 2007:
  - 8th, European Championship relay race (together with Ola Herje Hovdenak, Martin Bartnes and Ove-Erik Tronvoll)
- 2008:
  - 5th, Pierra Menta (together with Alexandre Pellicier)
  - 6th, World Championship combination ranking
  - 7th, World Championship relay race (together with Ove-Erik Tronvoll, Ola Herje Hovdenak and Ole-Jakob Sande)
  - 9th, World Championship vertical race
  - 9th, World Championship team race (together with Ola Herje Hovdenak)
- 2009:
  - 7th, European Championship relay race (together with Ola Herje Hovdenak, Ove-Erik Tronvoll and Rolv Eriksrud)
- 2010:
  - 7th, World Championship relay race (together with Ove-Erik Tronvoll, Ola Herje Hovdenak and Per Gustav Porsanger)
- 2011:
  - 8th, World Championship relay, together with Ola Herje Hovdenak, Ove-Erik Tronvoll and Thomas Oyberg
  - 9th, World Championship vertical race
- 2012:
  - 6th, European Championship relay, together with Ola Herje Hovdenak, Ove-Erik Tronvoll and Olav Tronvoll

== Cross-country skiing results ==
All results are sourced from the International Ski Federation (FIS).

=== World Cup ===
==== Season standings ====
Season	Age			
Season	Age	Overall	Distance	Sprint
2004	25	NC	NC	—
