= Trine Eilertsen =

Norwegian newspaper editor

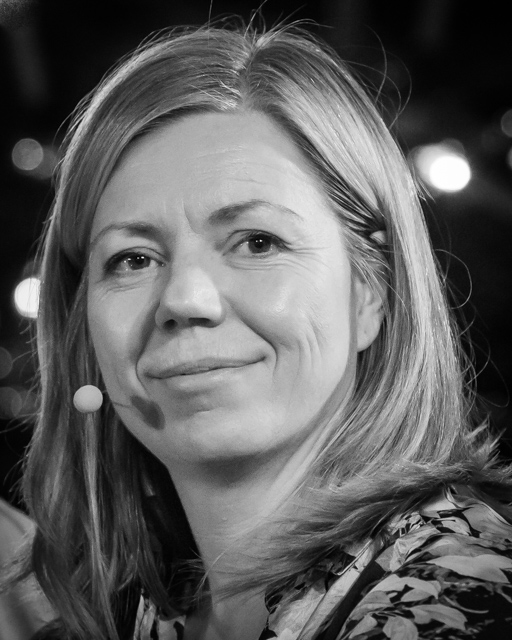
- Trine Eilertsen during the recording of a podcast in 2015
- Born: 1 May 1969 (age 57); Bærum, Akershus, Norway
- Education: Norwegian School of Economics and Business Administration; University of Bergen
- Occupations: Journalist; Newspaper editor

Trine Eilertsen (born 1 May 1969) is a Norwegian journalist and newspaper editor. She is the current editor-in-chief of the Norwegian newspaper Aftenposten.

== Early life and education ==
Eilertsen was born in Bærum and grew up at Sotra. She graduated from the Norwegian School of Economics and Business Administration in 1996 and from the University of Bergen in 1997.

== Career ==
Eilertsen worked in Statoil as a trainee from 1998 to 1999 before being hired in Bergens Tidende as a journalist. She advanced to political subeditor in 2002 and editor-in-chief in 2008. She changed jobs to political commentator in the Norwegian Broadcasting Corporation in 2013, and political editor of Aftenposten in 2014.

She was appointed chief editor of Aftenposten from January 2020, succeeding Espen Egil Hansen.

== Other activities ==
- Trilateral Commission, Member of the European Group

Media offices
Preceded by Einar Hålien	Chief editor of Bergens Tidende; 2008–2012	Succeeded by Gard Steiro
Preceded by Espen Egil Hansen	Chief editor of Aftenposten; 2020–	Incumbent
