= Josefina Wikberg =

Swedish adventure racer and ski mountaineer

Personal information
- Nationality: Swedish
- Born: 8 July 1982 (age 43)

Sport
- Sport: adventure racing, ski mountaineer

Josefina Wikberg (born 8 July 1982) is a Swedish adventure racer and ski mountaineer. She is a member of the Swedish National Teams in both sports. In 2014, she placed second in the two-day Keb Classic with teammates Charlotte Kalla, multiple cross-country World and Olympic Champion, and Emelie Forsberg, three-time Skyrunner World Series winner in the Ultra discipline.

Forsberg has won the Vértex Vinter solo event twice and the duo event also three times.
