= Einar Hålien =

Norwegian editor (born 1963)

Einar Hålien (born 17 November 1963) is a Norwegian editor.

== Career ==
He was hired as a journalist in the Norwegian Broadcasting Corporation in 1989, and led the district offices of the Broadcasting Corporation in Nordland from 1993 to 1995 and Hordaland from 1995 to 1997. He was appointed chief editor of the large regional newspaper Bergens Tidende in 1997, and became director in Schibsted in 2008.

== Personal life ==
He was born in Fagernes.

Media offices
Preceded by Hans Erik Matre	Chief editor of Bergens Tidende; 1997–2008	Succeeded by Trine Eilertsen
