= Martin Bartnes =

Norwegian ski mountaineer and cross-country skier

Personal information
- Full name: Martin W. Bartnes
- Born: 11 April 1978 (age 48) Levanger Municipality, Norway

Sport
- Sport: Skiing

Martin W. Bartnes (born 11 April 1978) is a Norwegian ski mountaineer and cross-country skier.

Bartnes was born in Levanger Municipality. In 2006, when he started ski mountaineering, he competed in his first race in Oppdal Municipality, and became a member of the national team. Together with Ola Berger, Ove-Erik Tronvoll and Ola Herje Hovdenak, he placed eighth in the relay event of the 2007 European Championship of Ski Mountaineering. He currently lives in Trondheim. His club is Steinkjer SK.
