= Kjartan Fløgstad =

Norwegian writer

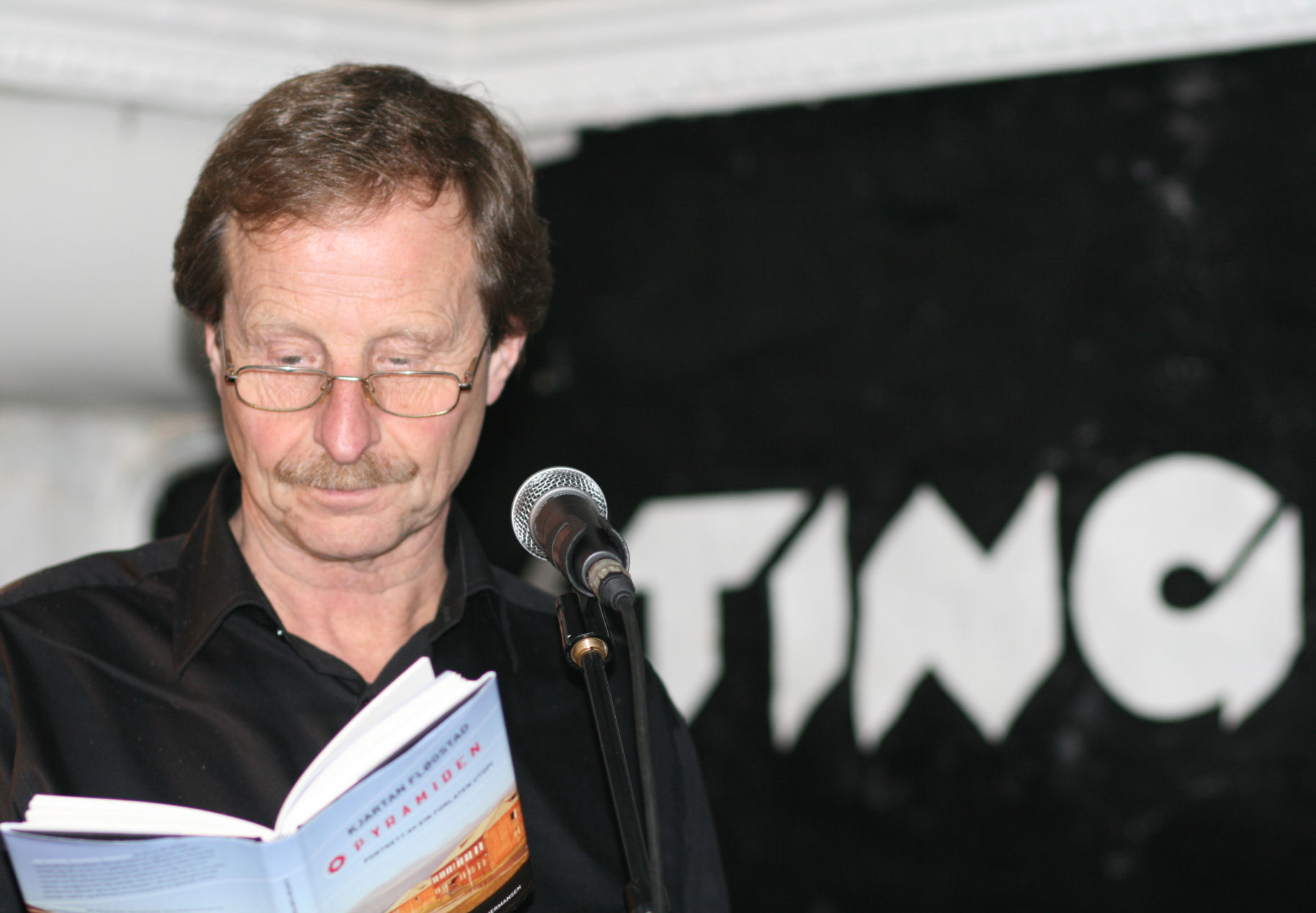
- Kjartan Fløgstad at the festival in Café Sting 2007
- Born: 7 June 1944 (age 82); Sauda, Norway
- Occupation: writer
- Children: Aslak Nore

Kjartan Fløgstad (born 7 June 1944) is a Norwegian author. Fløgstad was born in the industrial city of Sauda in Ryfylke, Rogaland. He studied literature and linguistics at the University of Bergen. Subsequently, he worked for a period as an industrial worker and as a sailor before he debuted as a poet with his collection of poems titled Valfart (Pilgrimage) in 1968. He received the Nordic Council's Literature Prize for his 1977 novel Dalen Portland (Dollar Road). Other major works include Fyr og flamme (Fire and Flame), Kron og mynt, Grand Manila and Grense Jakobselv.

== Literary work ==
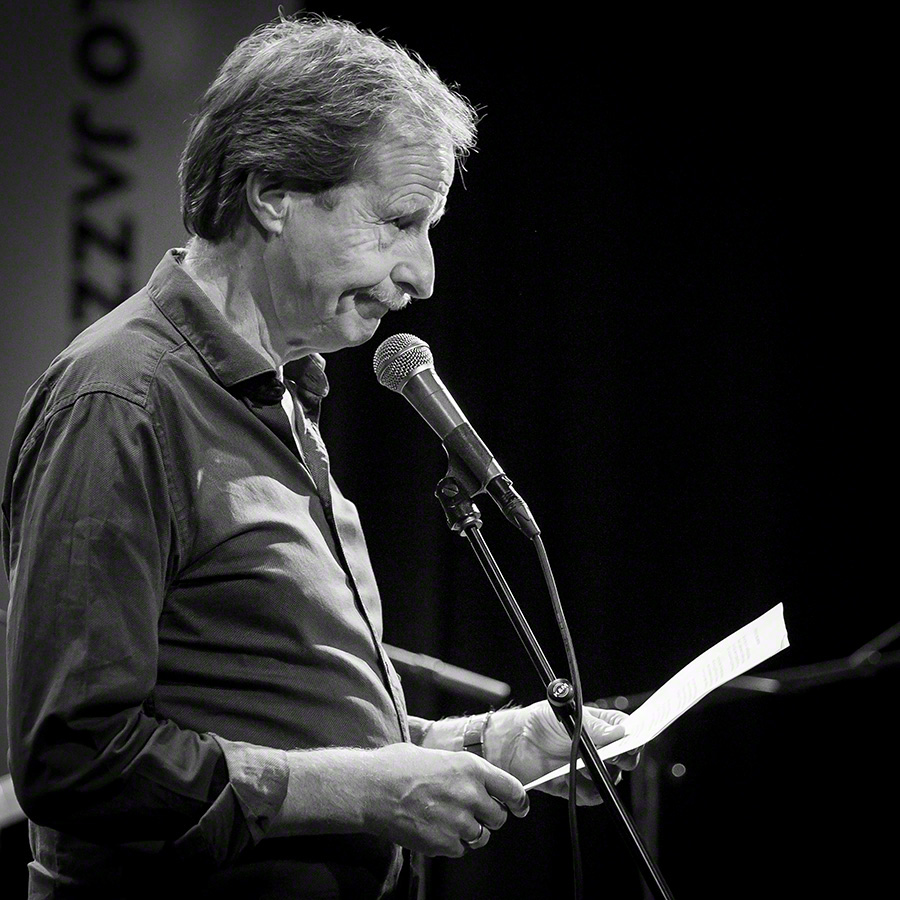
Kjartan Fløgstad at Oslo Jazzfestival 2016

Fløgstad initial prose work, Den hemmelege jubel (The Secret Exultation), was published in 1970. In 1972 he published the short story collection Fangliner (Ropes), where he encourages seaman and shift workers in heavy industry to make themselves heard in their own language, and the author's Marxist viewpoint became apparent. In the 1970s he also wrote two crime novels using the two pseudonyms K. Villun and K. Villum. His major breakthrough came in 1977 with the novel Dalen Portland (Dollar Road); which was awarded the Nordic Council's Literature Prize. Following this, Fyr og flamme (Fire and Flame) in 1980 and Det 7. klima (The Seventh Climate) in 1986 were his next most recognized works. In the major novels he demonstrates a command of realistic precision combined with an understanding of sociology. Fløgstad's work depicts the economic and social transitions as Norway moves from an agricultural culture to an industrial society, and then to a post-industrial society.

Fløgstad's style of writing, as demonstrated in both fiction and non-fiction, is very characteristic; many puns, allusions to other texts and to films and a mix of sociolects. He is one of the best-known authors associated with magic realism in Norway, and his overall realistic plots often feature many fantastic twists.

== Bibliography ==
- Valfart (Pilgrimage) - collection of poetry (1968)
- Sememoniar (Ceremonies) - collection of poetry (1969)
- Den hemmelege jubel (The Secret Exultation) - Prose (1970)
- Fangliner (Ropes) - Short Stories (1972)
- Dikt i utval av Pablo Neruda (Translation of a selection of poetry by Pablo Neruda) - translated poetry (1973)
- Litteratur i revolusjonen. Dikt frå Cuba (Literature in the Revolution. Poetry from Cuba) - translated poetry (1973)
- Rasmus (Rasmus) - novel (1974)
- Døden ikke heller (Death without end) - Crime Novel (1975) - under the pseudonym K. Villum
- Ein for alle (One for all) - Crime Novel (1976) - under the pseudonym K. Villun
- Dalen Portland (Dollar Road) - novel (1977)
- Fyr og flamme (Fire and flame) - novel (1980)
- Loven vest for Pecos (The Law West of Pecos) - essays (1981)
- U 3 - novel (1983)
- Ordlyden (The Wording) - essays (1983)
- Det 7. klima (The Seventh Climate) - novel (1986)
- Tyrannosaurus Text (Tyrannosaurus Text) - essays (1988)
- Portrett av eit magisk liv. Poeten Claes Gill (Portrait of a Magic Life: The Poet Claes Gill) - biography (1988)
- Arbeidets lys. Tungindustrien in Sauda through 75 år (Heavy Industry in Sauda through 75 years) - (1990)
- Kniven på strupen - novel (1991)
- Fimbul (Fimbul) - novel (1994)
- Dikt og spelmannsmusikk 1968-1993 (Poetry and Fiddlers' Music) - (1993)
- Pampa Union. Latinamerikanske reiser (Pampa union. Latin American Journeys) - Travelography (1994)
- Ved Roma port ( ) - pamphlet (1994)
- Antipoder (Antipodes) - essays (1996)
- Kron og mynt (Heads or Tails) - novel 1998)
- Dei ytterste ting. Nødvendighetsartiklar (The Ultimate Questions) - essays (1998)
- Eld og vatn. Nordmenn i Sør-Amerika (Fire and Water. Norwegians in South America) - Prose (1999)
- Evig varer lengst (Where have all the lovers gone?) - Play (2000)
- Sudamericana (South America) - Travelography (2000)
- Osloprosessen (The Oslo Process) - (2000)
- Sudamericana. Latinamerikanske reiser (South America. Latin America travels) - Travelography (2000)
- Shanghai Ekspress (Shanghai Express) - Travelography (2001)
- Paradis på jord ( Paradise on Earth) - novel (2002)
- Hotell Tropical (Tropical Hotel) - Travelography (2003)
- Pablo Neruda: Kapteinens vers (Pablo Neruda: Captain's Verse) - translated Poetry (2003)
- Brennbart (Combustibles) - Prose (2004)
- Snøhetta: hus som vil meg hysa - Non-fiction on the Norwegian architects (2004)
- Grand Manila - novel (2006)
- Pyramiden, portrett av ein forlaten utopi - essays (2007)
- Gi lyd. Tekstar 1968-2008. Selected works by Agnes Ravatn and Trygve Åslund (2008)
- Nordaustpassasjen (Northward) - (2012)
- Due og drone ["pigeon and drone"] (2019)
- Habeas Corpus - novel (2022)

== Prizes ==
- Aschehougprisen 1975
- The Nordic Council's Literature Prize 1978, for Dalen Portland
- The Norwegian Critics Prize for Literature 1980, for Fyr and flamme
- Melsom Prize 1981
- Nynorsk Literature Prize 1983, for U3
- Stavanger Aftenblads kulturpris
- Nynorsk (new Norwegian) litteraturpris 1986, for Det 7. klima
- Gyldendals legacy 1991
- Doblougprisen 1997
- Brage Prize 1998, for Kron and mynt
- Gyldendalprisen 1998
- Edvardprisen 2003
- Bernardo O'Higgins-ordenen, awarded by Chile's government in 2004
- The honorary Brage Prize, an open special award
- Nynorsk User of the Year, 2005
