= Endre Hansen =

Norwegian footballer (born 1978)

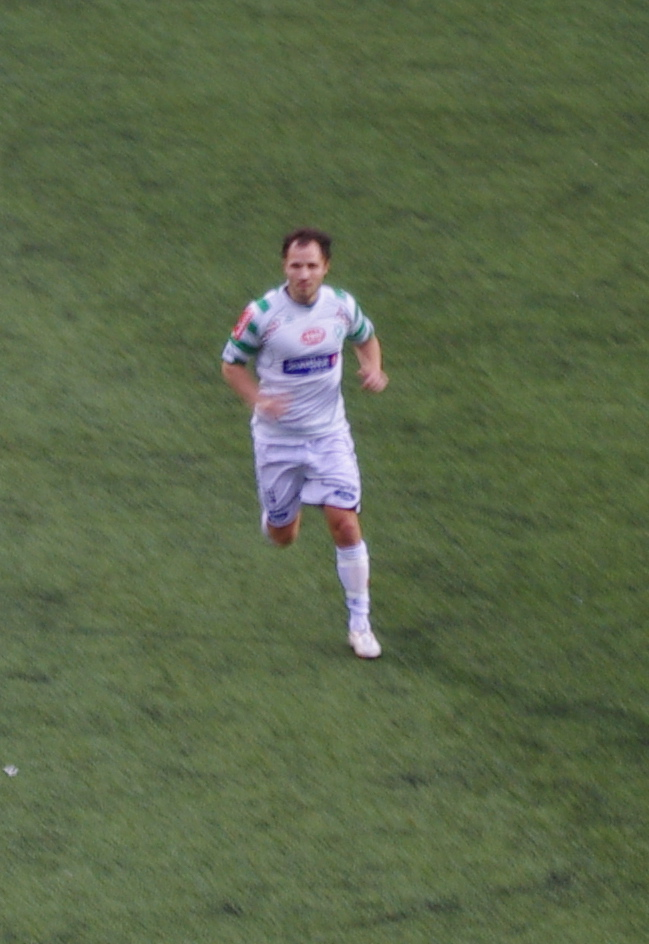

Personal information
- Date of birth: 14 February 1978 (age 48)
- Height: 1.75 m (5 ft 9 in)
- Position: Midfielder

Team information
- Current team: Øystese

Senior career*
Years	Team	Apps	(Gls)
- Kvernbit
2001–2002	Brann	12	(0)
2003–2004	Åsane		
2005–2007	Løv-Ham	68	(3)
2008–2010	Åsane		
2011	Løv-Ham	1	(0)
2012–	Øystese		
- * Club domestic league appearances and goals as of 13 May 2012

Endre Hansen (born 14 February 1978) is a Norwegian football midfielder who currently plays for Øystese IL.

He started his career in IL Kvernbit. He was in the squad of SK Brann in 2001, but did not get any Norwegian Premier League games until the next year. He played 12 games in 2002. After the season, he was declared unwanted by Brann. He then joined Åsane. After the 2004 season he joined Løv-Ham. After the 2007 season he rejoined Åsane, but ahead of the 2011 season he went back to Løv-Ham. In 2012, he joined fourth-tier club Øystese IL.
