= Kjetil Norland =

Norwegian footballer (born 1978)

Personal information
- Date of birth: 20 April 1978 (age 48)
- Position: Striker

Senior career*
Years	Team	Apps	(Gls)
2000–2001	Brann		
2001	→ Nest-Sotra (loan)	1	(0)
2002–	Nest-Sotra		
–2006	Sandnes Ulf		
2007–2008	Havørn		
- * Club domestic league appearances and goals

Kjetil Norland (born 20 April 1978) is a retired Norwegian football striker.

He got one Norwegian Premier League game for SK Brann in 2000. In the second half of the 2001 season he was loaned out to Nest-Sotra. After the season, he joined Nest-Sotra permanently. He later joined Sandnes Ulf, and was a top goalscorer at the club. Ahead of the 2007 season he joined IL Havørn. He left halfway in the 2008 season. He resides in Florvåg.
