= Øyulf Hjertenes =

Norwegian journalist

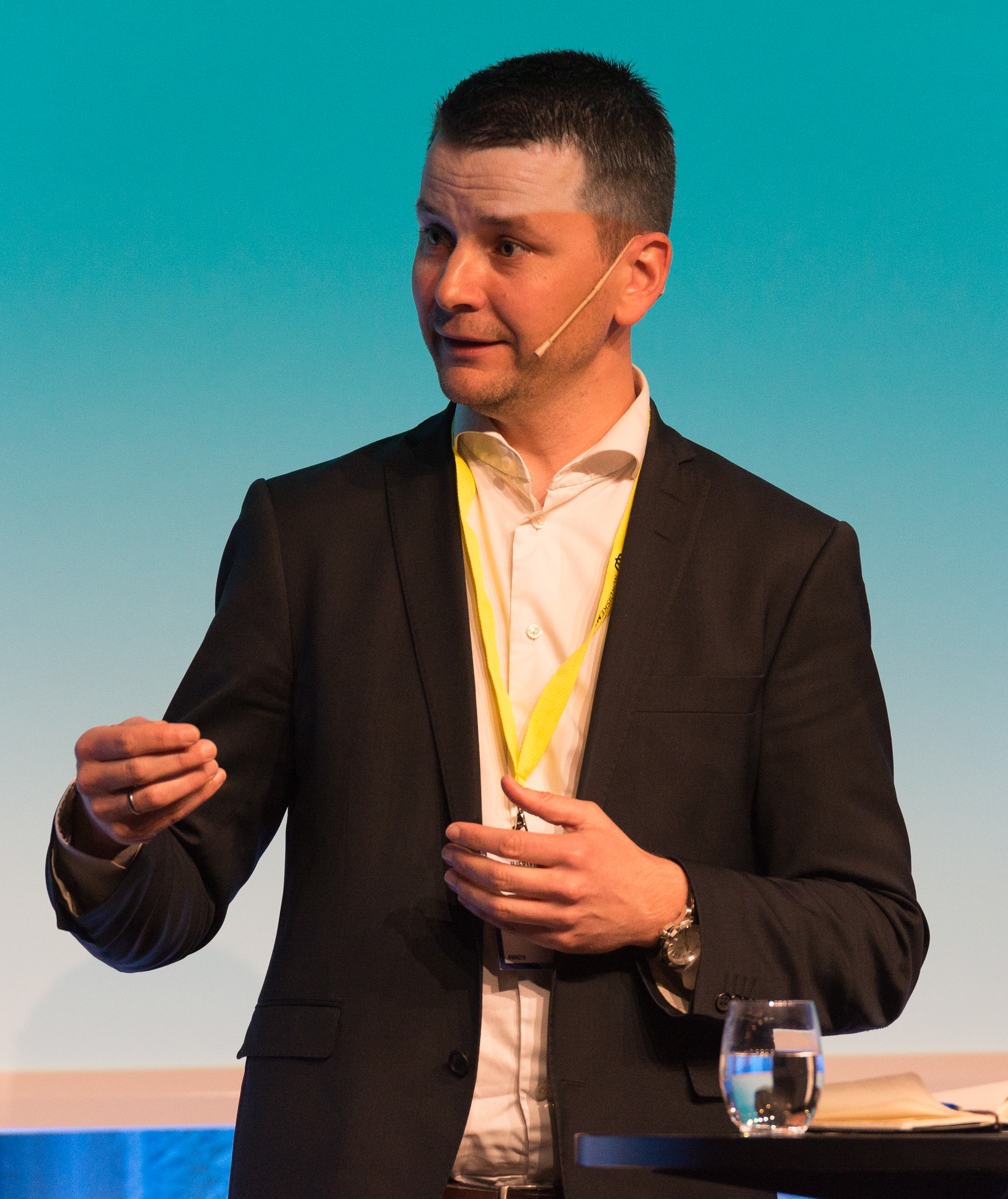
- Born: 23 May 1979 (age 47); Florø
- Education: Norwegian School of Economics
- Occupations: Economist, journalist and newspaper editor

Øyulf Hjertenes (born 23 May 1979) is a Norwegian economist, journalist and newspaper editor.

== Career ==
Hjertenes was born in Florø. He is educated cand.oecon. from the Norwegian School of Economics. He has worked as journalist for the newspapers Dagbladet, Bergensavisen and Firdaposten. He was chief editor of the newspaper Bergens Tidende from 2015 to 2019. In 2019 he was assigned another administrative position in the Schibsted media group, and Frøy Gudbrandsen took over as chief editor of Bergens Tidende.

In 2026 Hjertenes was appointed chief executive of the media house Polaris Media, starting from 2027.

Media offices
Preceded by Gard Steiro	Chief editor of Bergens Tidende; 2015–2019	Succeeded by Frøy Gudbrandsen
