= Mette Karlsvik =

Norwegian author (born 1978)

- Born: 28 November 1978 (age 47); Frei Municipality, Nordmøre, Norway
- Occupation: Author
- Writing career
- Period: 2005–present
- Genres: Children's books and novels

Mette Karlsvik (born 28 November 1978) is a Norwegian author.

== Biography and career ==
Karlsvik was raised in Frei Municipality in Nordmøre, and has an International Baccalaureate from the Red Cross Nordic United World College. She is educated as a fine artist from the Glasgow School of Art, and a journalist from the University of Bergen, and holds a certificate from The Bergen Academy of Writing. She was awarded the 2005 Tarjei Vesaas' debutantpris for her first novel, Vindauga i matsalen vender mot fjorden, and the 2012 (and first ever) Stig Sæterbakkens Minnepris, the 2012 Bokhandlerstipendet and the 2012 Skardstipendet for her novel "Bli Björk". The novel was also nominated for the Brageprisen 2012. Karlsvik has held positions in the field of literature, in the artist grants system at Arts Council Norway, the Union of Norwegian authors, and in the Norwegian Non-Fiction Writers and Translators Association.

== Bibliography ==
- 2005 – Vindauga i matsalen vender mot fjorden (novel, Det norske Samlaget)
- 2007 – Flytårn (novel, Det norske Samlaget)
- 2008 – Pol (novel, Det norske Samlaget)
- 2009 – 1–2–TRE (children's novel, Det norske Samlaget)
- 2011 – Post Oske/ Dagar og netter i Reykjavik (non-fiction, Flamme Forlag)
- 2011 – Bli Björk (novel, Det norske Samlaget)
- 2012 – Vis meg ditt bibliotek (non-fiction, Bergen Offentlige Bibliotek)
- 2012 – Prinsland (novel, Magikon Forlag)
- 2013 – Behind Silence (booklet published by Janne Kruse for her exhibition Behind Silence (Kunstnerforbundet, Oslo Norway 2012))
- 2013 – Drømmefabrikken. Teaterhøgskolens historie sett gjennom åtte forfatteres øyne. Chapter: "1996-2003: Ein revolusjon?" (Transit Forlag')
- 2013 – Vekstvilkår (non-fiction, Spriten Forlag)
- 2013 – Øy/ Ey (poetry, House of foundation)
- 2014 – Dyrebar (children's novel, Magikon Forlag)
- 2014 – Den beste hausten er etter monsun (novel, Det norske Samlaget])
- 2015 – UR (poetry, Spriten Forlag)
- 2016 – Avstand (non-fiction, Spriten Forlag)
- 2016 – Varmá (novel, Det norske Samlaget)
- 2017 – Mørkerom (novel, Det norske Samlaget)
- 2018 – Kjøt (cartoon, Magikon Forlag, with visual artist Tord Torpe)
- 2019 – Meieriet (novel, Det norske Samlaget)
- 2019 – Same tid neste veke. Samtaler med Thorvald Steen (non fiction, Pax forlag)
- 2022 – Surtsey (novel, Det norske Samlaget)

== Performance arts ==
- 2011 – Plass (director: Øystein Brager, producer Dramatikkens hus)
- 2015 – Heksejakt (director: Jon Tombre, producers Teateret vårt and Fagerlia VGS)
- 2015 – Majka, jenta frå verdsrommet kjem att (director: Jon Tombre, producer Dramatikkens hus)
- 2017 – Spel om draum (director: Jon Tombre, producer Fagerlia VGS)
- 2019-2022 – Surtsey (director: Jon Tombre, producers Karlsvik & Tombre + Høstscena + Norræna husid Reykjavik)
- 2022 – Dei som fer (co-authoring with Arne Lygre Director: Mari Vatne Kjeldstadli, producer Teateret vårt)

Awards
Preceded by Ole Asbjørn Ness	Winner of Tarjei Vesaas' debutantpris 2005	Succeeded by Thomas Marco Blatt
