= Ingemund Fænn =

Norwegian newspaper editor

Ingemund Fænn (18 September 1907 – 19 June 1987) was a Norwegian newspaper editor.

He was born in Stryn Municipality. He worked in Fjordingen from 1928 to 1936, and was hired in Bergens Tidende in 1936. He advanced to head of its Oslo office in 1946, and was editor-in-chief from 1956 to 1977.

Media offices
Preceded by Haakon Torsvik	Chief editor of Bergens Tidende; 1956–1977	Succeeded by Kjartan Rødland
