= Aslak Nore =

Norwegian writer (born 1978)

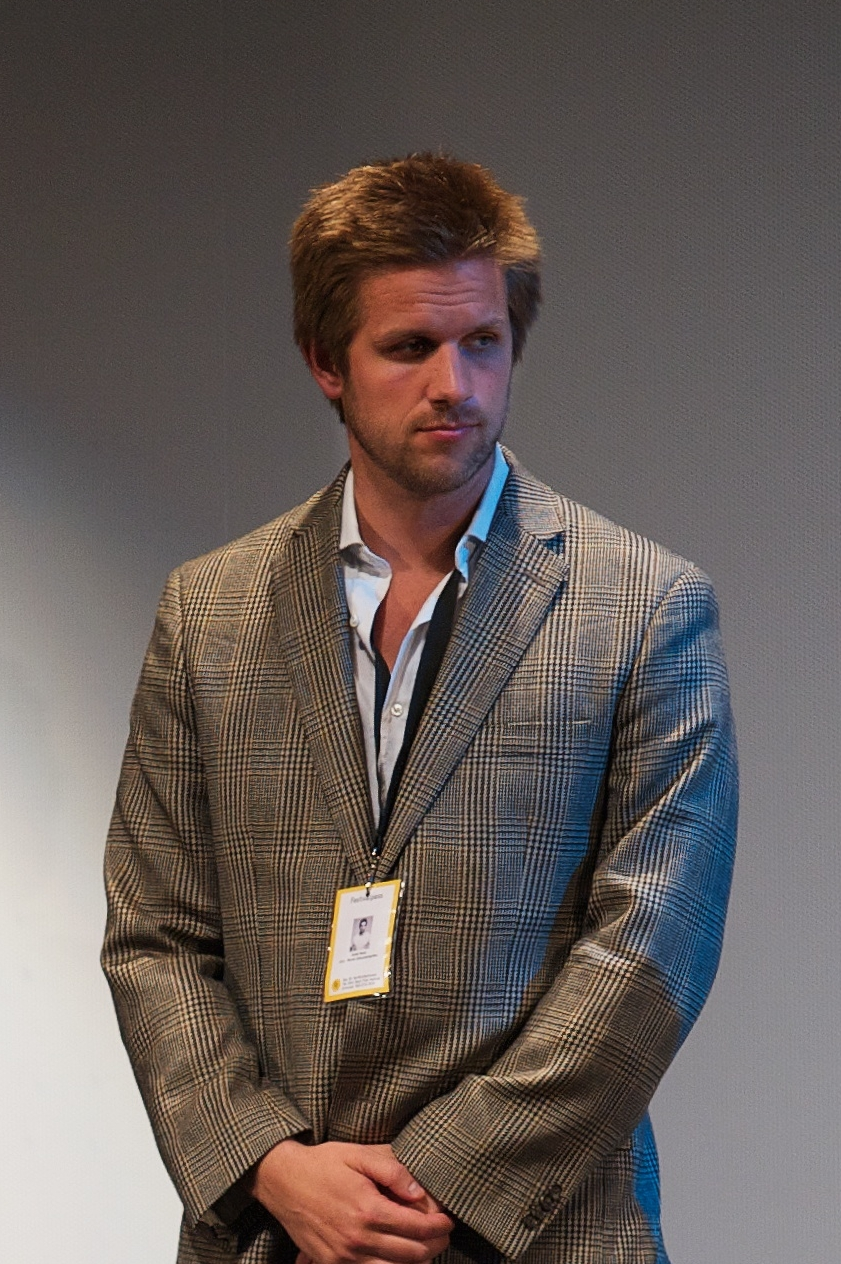
- Nore in 2010
- Born: 12 May 1978 (age 48); Oslo, Norway
- Occupations: journalist, publisher, non-fiction and crime fiction writer
- Parent: Kjartan Fløgstad
- Awards: Riverton Prize (2017)

Aslak Nore (born 12 May 1978) is a Norwegian journalist, publisher, non-fiction and crime fiction writer. He was awarded the Riverton Prize in 2017.

== Personal life ==
Nore was born in Oslo on 12 May 1978, and is the son of the writer Kjartan Fløgstad.

== Career ==
With a background as a soldier and publisher, Nore made his literary debut in 2007, with the documentary novel Gud er norsk. Later books are Ekstremistan (2009), and the thrillers En norsk spion (2012), and Oslo Noir (2014). In 2014 he published a book on the 2014 FIFA World Cup, Brasil 2014, together with his father Kjartan Fløgstad. The espionage thriller Ulvefellen from 2017 is set during World War II. For Ulvefellen, he was awarded the Riverton Prize in 2017. His 2021 novel Havets kirkegård centres on intrigues in a fictional Norwegian family, interwoven with actual events during World War II. The sequel Ingen skal drukne (2023) deals with further intrigues in the same family and the family company.

== Bibliography ==
- Gud er norsk: Soldatene fra fredsnasjonen (2007)
- Ekstremistan: Frykt og håp i det flerkulturelle Norge (2009)
- En norsk spion (2012)
- Oslo Noir, Aschehoug (2014)
- Ulvefellen, Aschehoug (2017)
- Havets kirkegård, Aschehoug (2021)
- Ingen skal drukne, Aschehoug (2023)
