= Ove-Erik Tronvoll =

Norwegian ski mountaineer and cross-country skier

Personal information
- Nationality: Norway
- Born: 21 September 1972 (age 53)

Sport
- Sport: Skiing
- Club: Byåsen IL

World Cup career
- Seasons: 2 – (2000–2001)
- Indiv. starts: 3
- Indiv. podiums: 0
- Team starts: 1
- Team podiums: 0
- Overall titles: 0 – (105th in 2000)
- Discipline titles: 0

Ove-Erik Tronvoll (born 21 September 1972) is a Norwegian ski mountaineer and cross-country skier.

== Cross-country skiing results ==
All results are sourced from the International Ski Federation (FIS).

=== World Cup ===
==== Season standings ====
| Season | Age | | | | |
| Season | Age | Overall | Long Distance | Middle Distance | Sprint |
|---|---|---|---|---|---|
| 2000 | 35 | 103 | NC | — | 53 |
| 2001 | 36 | NC | —N/a | —N/a | — |

== Selected results ==
- 2007:
  - 8th, European Championship relay race (together with Ola Berger, Martin Bartnes and Ola Herje Hovdenak)
- 2008:
  - 7th, World Championship relay race (together with Ola Berger, Ola Herje Hovdenak and Ole-Jakob Sande)
  - 9th, World Championship team race (together with Ola Berger)
- 2009:
  - 7th, European Championship relay race (together with Ola Berger, Ola Herje Hovdenak and Rolv Eriksrud)
- 2010:
  - 7th, World Championship relay race (together with Ola Herje Hovdenak, Ola Berger and Per Gustav Porsanger)
- 2011:
  - 8th, World Championship relay, together with Ola Herje Hovdenak, Ola Berger and Thomas Oyberg
- 2012:
  - 6th, European Championship relay, together with Ola Berger, Ola Herje Hovdenak and Olav Tronvoll
