= Rune Berger =

Norwegian footballer (born 1978)

Personal information
- Date of birth: 1 April 1978 (age 48)
- Place of birth: Tromsø, Norway
- Height: 1.83 m (6 ft 0 in)
- Position: Striker

Senior career*
Years	Team	Apps	(Gls)
1996–2002	Tromsø	41	(11)
1998–1999	→ Alta (loan)		
2000	→ Bristol Rovers (loan)	2	(0)
2003–2005	Aalesund	17	(1)
2005–2006	Tromsø	14	(1)
2006–2009	Alta		

Managerial career
- 2011–: Alta
- * Club domestic league appearances and goals

Rune Berger (formerly known as Rune Johansen; born 1 April 1978) is a Norwegian footballer who played as a striker for Tromsø, Aalesund and Alta. While at Tromsø he spent a period on loan with Bristol Rovers in England in late 2000. This was his best season as he scored 8 goals in 14 Norwegian Premier League appearances.

After retiring as a player, he became a coach with Alta IF. He advanced from assistant coach to head coach ahead of the 2011 season.
