= Lita Prahl =

Norwegian actress and costume designer

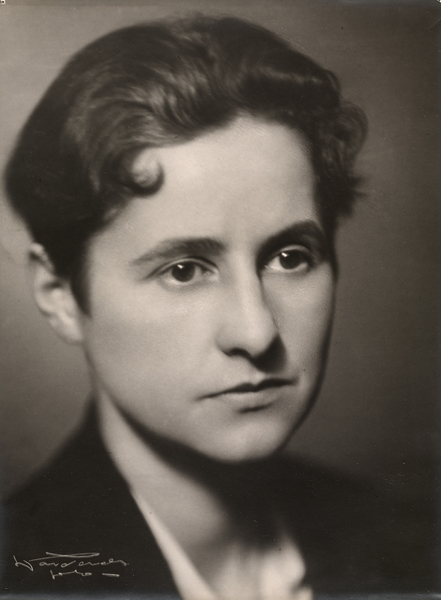
Lita Prahl, c. 1935

Lita Prahl (21 March 1905 – 7 May 1978) was a Norwegian actress and costume designer.

In the years 1925-1937, she acted at Den Nationale Scene in Bergen and at the Nationaltheatret. From 1938–1975, she worked in costume design at Nationaltheatret in Oslo where she became head of costumes. She may be best-remembered for her role as the governess Mlle de Polignac in the Norwegian Christmas film Tante Pose (1940), written by Gabriel Scott and directed by Leif Sinding. She was listed as Lizzie Prahl and was also credited with costume design on this film.
