= Arne Hestenes =

Norwegian journalist and author

Arne Hestenes, pen name Plut (29 January 1920 – 3 January 1995) was a Norwegian journalist and author. He wrote feature pieces (literary journalism) and was a restaurant critic and film critic.

== Biography ==
Arne Magnus Hestenes was born in Tromsø as a son of manager Ola Hestenes (1891–1961) and Gerda Kristine Larsen (1897–1963). He was a brother of barrister Olav Hestenes.

He started his writing career with columns in Tromsø Stiftstidende, but wanted to work for Dagbladet and got his first article on print there at the age of 17. He took the examen artium in 1939 and moved to study at the University of Oslo. His studies were interrupted during the occupation of Norway by Nazi Germany. Following the 1943 University of Oslo fire, the Nazi German officials closed the university. Hestenes re-located to Stockholm, Sweden. He worked for the Norwegian resistance movement at Sikringstjenesten which was operated by Milorg. His code name was "Plut", which was later his journalistic signature after the war.

After the liberation of Norway at the end of World War II in 1945, he returned to Norway. He graduated at the University of Oslo with a cand.mag. degree in 1947 and was hired by Dagbladet as a journalist. He remained in Dagbladet for the rest of his career. He wrote an assessment of the night life, especially in Oslo; and through the years he became a knowledgeable film critic. He became best known for his personal style which combined witty metaphors, quick and easy irony replicas, inventive word combinations and comic exaggerations.

Hestenes was additionally a portrait artist. Dating from the 1940s, he worked with the artist Gösta Hammarlund. He also released several books with collections of his newspaper columns. Some of the more well-known books include Galleri Plut (1969) and Zoom (1976). He was a jury member of the 1984 Cannes Film Festival, and an honorary citizen of Cannes as well as his hometown Tromsø.

During the course of his career, he received a number of awards including the Norsk Industriforbunds pressepris, Oslo Riksmålsforenings Gullpenn, Oslo Kinematografers Chaplin-statuett and Haugesund Bys Hederspris. He was awarded the Narvesen Prize for journalism in 1963, and also won the Oslo City artist award (Oslo bys kunstnerpris). He was decorated with the Royal Norwegian Order of St. Olav (Knight, First Class) in 1991, as well as the French Ordre national du Mérite (Chevalier) and the Ordre des Arts et des Lettres (Officier).

== Personal life ==
He was married to Sonja Karin Bergan (1939–2001), and lived between Aker brygge and Solli plass. He died in January 1995 and was buried at Vestre gravlund in Oslo.

Awards
Preceded by Odd Hagen and Gidske Anderson	Recipient of the Narvesen Prize; 1963	Succeeded by Einar Eriksen
