= Siri Hall Arnøy =

Norwegian politician (born 1978)

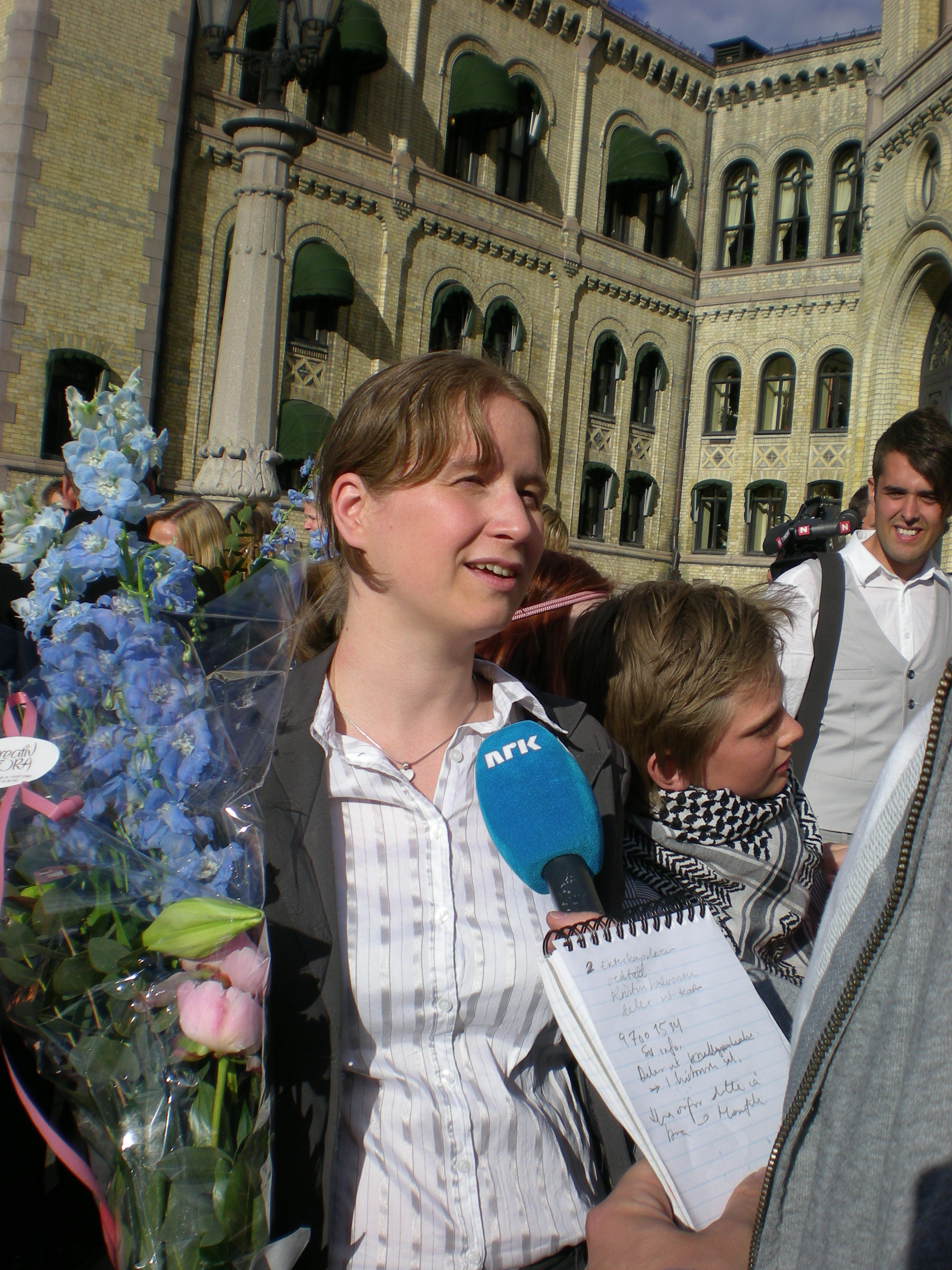
Siri Hall Arnøy.

Siri Hall Arnøy (born 28 November 1978, in Oslo) is a former Norwegian politician for the Socialist Left Party.

She was elected to the Norwegian Parliament from Akershus in 2001, but was not re-elected in 2005. She then served in the position of deputy representative during the term 2005–2009.

Arnøy is openly lesbian.

In 2012, she took the PhD at the Norwegian University of Science and Technology with the thesis The Hopeful Hydrogen. Scientists Advocating Their Matter of Concern.
