= Knut Sirevåg =

Norwegian footballer (born 1978)

Personal information
- Date of birth: 26 August 1978 (age 48)
- Position: Defender

Youth career
- Bryne

Senior career*
| Years | Team | Apps | (Gls) |
| 1995–2006 | Bryne | | |

International career
| 1994 | Norway U15 | 8 | (1) |
| 1995 | Norway U16 | 9 | (0) |
| 1996 | Norway U17 | 7 | (0) |
| 1997 | Norway U18 | 5 | (0) |
| 1997 | Norway U20 | 2 | (0) |
| 1998 | Norway U21 | 3 | (0) |
- * Club domestic league appearances and goals

Knut Sirevåg (born 26 August 1978) is a retired Norwegian footballer who played as a defender. He played for Bryne FK his entire senior career, from 1995 to 2006, including their period in the Eliteserien.

He is a son of Trond Sirevåg, who managed Bryne FK in 1995, when Knut made his first-team debut. He made his youth international debut for Norway in 1994.

A new highlight was reached when Sirevåg and Bryne won promotion from the 1999 1. divisjon to the 2000 Eliteserien. He got a one-year extension of his contract. The club was criticized by some for signing too many external players, especially from Sweden. Knut Sirevåg, being one of the last local players, stated: "It is outright critical if we reach Ullevaal and the national anthem has to be sung in Swedish".
