= Olav Hestenes =

Norwegian barrister (1930–1996)

- Born: 11 February 1930; Tromsø, Norway
- Died: 29 November 1996 (aged 66)
- Occupation: Barrister
- Relatives: Arne Hestenes (brother)

Olav Hestenes (11 February 1930 – 29 November 1996) was a Norwegian barrister.

He was born in Tromsø, a son of Ola Hestenes and Gerda Kristine Larsen, and was a brother of journalist Arne Hestenes. He represented the defendant in more than two hundred murder cases, including several with high media profile. He wrote two autobiographical books, Kamp i sort kappe from 1990, and Underveis med hvite hansker from 1992.
