= Gard Steiro =

Norwegian journalist and newspaper editor

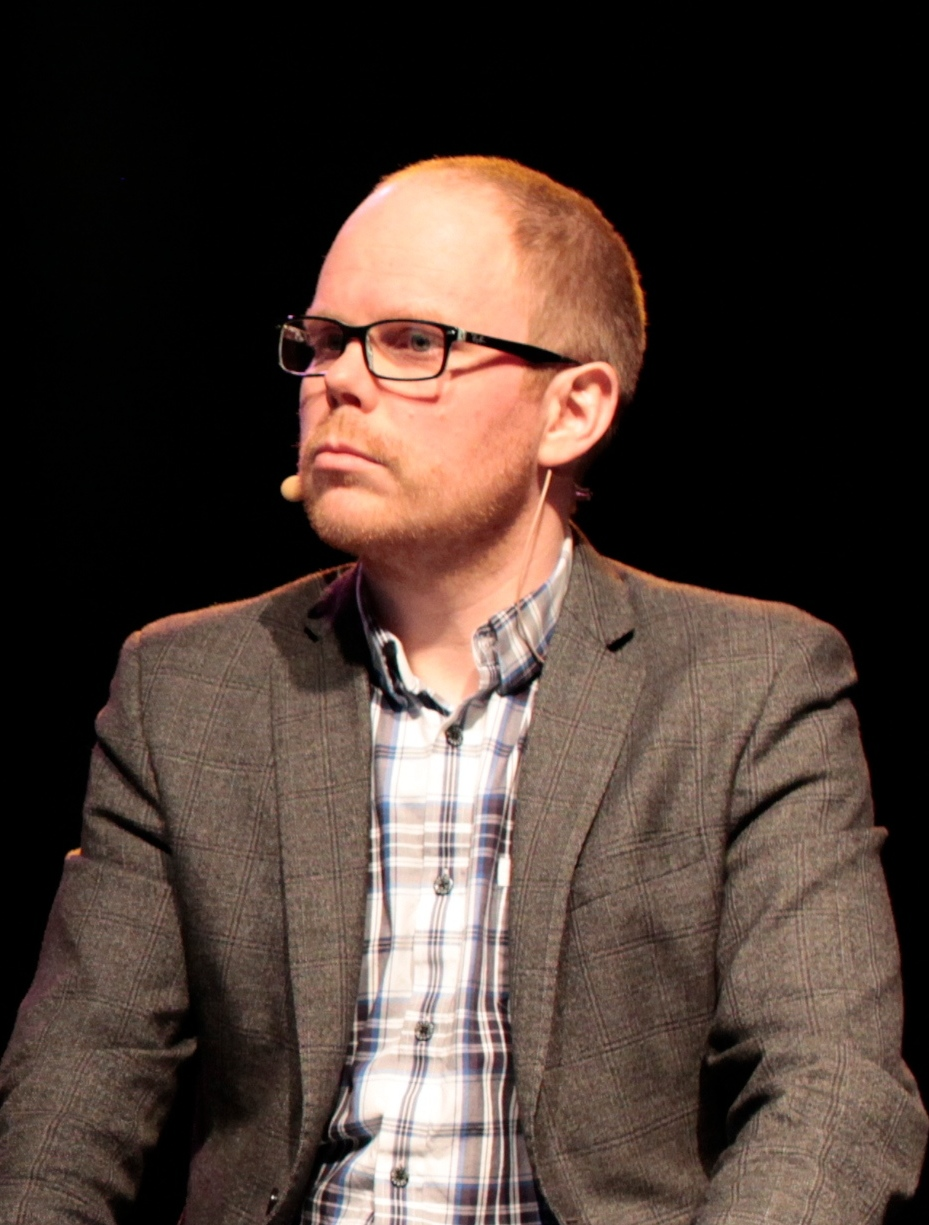
- Born: 26 January 1976 (age 50); Bergen, Norway
- Occupations: journalist and newspaper editor
- Employer(s): Bergens Tidende; Verdens Gang

Gard Steiro (born 26 January 1976) is a Norwegian journalist and newspaper editor. He was chief editor for Bergens Tidende from 2012 to 2015, and for Verdens Gang from 2017 to 2026.

== Career ==
Born in Bergen on 26 January 1976, Steiro had a journalist career in the newspapers Askøyværingen, Bergensavisen, and Bergens Tidende. He was chief editor of the newspaper Bergens Tidende from 2012 to 2015, when he was succeeded by Øyulf Hjertenes.

In 2017 he was appointed chief editor and publisher for the newspaper Verdens Gang, succeeding Torry Pedersen. He ended his position in VG in 2026.

Media offices
Preceded by Trine Eilertsen	Chief editor of Bergens Tidende; 2012–2015	Succeeded by Øyulf Hjertenes
Preceded by Torry Pedersen	Chief editor of Verdens Gang; 2017–2026	Succeeded by TBD
