= Hilde Lindset =

Norwegian author (born 1978)

Hilde Lindset (born 6 May 1978 in Oslo) is a Norwegian author.

She grew up in the Solum area in the western part of Skien Municipality. She holds a cand.philol. degree in literature. She has published two collections of short stories. In 2013, she was the first recipient of the Saabye Christensen Award.

She has been a lecturer in Norwegian language and literature at the Goethe University in Frankfurt, and currently lives in Berlin.

== Works ==
- Jeg burde ha sperret deg inne, Cappelen Damm, 2012
- Helvetesporten, Cappelen Damm, 2014
- Til døden, Cappelen Damm, 2016
- Avskjeder med Judith, Cappelen Damm, 2017
