= Dalen Portland (novel) =

Book by Kjartan Fløgstad

- First edition
- Author: Kjartan Fløgstad
- Language: Norwegian
- Published: 1977
- Publisher: Det Norske Samlaget
- Publication place: Norway
- Awards: Nordic Council's Literature Prize of 1978

Dalen Portland is a 1977 novel by Norwegian author Kjartan Fløgstad. It won the Nordic Council's Literature Prize in 1978.
