= Maria Tryti Vennerød =

Norwegian playwright (born 1978)

Maria Tryti Vennerød (born 17 January 1978) is a Norwegian playwright.

== Career ==
Vennerød's first play, More, was produced at the Norwegian Drama Festival in 2002. Since then she has written about ten plays which have been performed by different theaters and ensembles in Norway and Sweden. In 2005 she received the Ibsen Award for the play The Lady at the Counter. Vennerød has directed two of her own plays, the first being Gokk in 2007 and the latter being Heat, a contemporary opera aimed at a younger audience, composed by Julian Skar. In 2010 her play Neverland was produced by Det Norske Teatret, directed by Jon Tombre.

== Works ==
=== Plays ===
- Nasjonal Prøve ["National test"] (2011) - DUS, Det Norske Teatret
- Confession (2011) - Schaubühne, Berlin (part of Writers´project at the F.I.N.D. festival 2011)
- Neverland (2010)- Det Norske Teatret, Oslo
- Kok ["Heat"] (2009) Contemporary opera. Music: Julian Skar. Det Åpne Teater, Oslo
- Gokk (2008) Sogn og Fjordane Teater and Black Box Teater, Oslo
- Krokodillen ["The Crocodile"] (2006) Teater Ibsen, Skien
- Safari (2006) Teater Blendwerk, Oslo
- Testen ["The Test"] (2006) The Norwegian Drama Festival, Oslo
- Frank (2005) Det Norske Teatret, Oslo . Winner of Norwegian-Swedish drama competition
- Dama i Luka ["The Lady at the Counter"] (2004)The Norwegian Drama Festival. The Ibsen Award
- Take Me By the Wings (2003) The Norwegian Drama Festival, and Sogn og Fjordane Teater
- More (2002) The Norwegian Drama Festival, Sogn og Fjordane Teater, Cinnober Theatre in Gothenburg and more.

=== Translations ===
- English: More, Frank, Neverland, National test
- Swedish: More, Take Me By the Wings
- Danish: Take Me By the Wings
- German: Safari, Neverland, Die Prüfung, Confession
- Portuguese: Frank
- Hungarian: Frank, "National test"
- Italian: More
- Romanian: Frank, Neverland, Safari

== Awards ==
- Norwegian-Swedish Drama Competition on the centennial of Norway's independence 1905-2005 (Frank)
- The Ibsen Award 2005 (The Lady at the Counter)
- 100 og NÅ i 2006 (The Test and Neverland)
