= Verdens Gang =

Norwegian daily newspaper

- Front page from 8 October 2006. Featured in the cover story is Austrian kidnap victim Natascha Kampusch.
- Type: Daily newspaper + online edition
- Format: Tabloid
- Owner: Schibsted
- Editor: Gard Steiro
- Founded: 1945; 81 years ago
- Political alignment: None
- Headquarters: Akersgata 55, Oslo, Norway
- ISSN: 0806-0894
- Website: www.vg.no

Verdens Gang (lit. 'The course of the world'), generally known under the abbreviation VG, is a Norwegian tabloid newspaper. In 2016, circulation numbers stood at 93,883, declining from a peak circulation of 390,510 in 2002. Nevertheless, VG is the most-read online newspaper in Norway, with about 2 million daily readers.

Verdens Gang AS is a private company wholly owned by the public company Schibsted ASA.

== History and profile ==
VG was established by members of the Norwegian resistance movement shortly after the country was liberated from German occupation in 1945. The first issue of the paper was published on 23 June 1945. Christian A. R. Christensen was the first editor-in-chief of VG from its start in 1945 to 1967, when he died.

VG is based in Oslo. The paper is published in tabloid format. The owner, media conglomerate Schibsted, also owns Norway's largest newspaper, Aftenposten, as well as newspapers in Sweden, Estonia, and shares in some of Norway's larger regional newspapers. Schibsted took over the paper following the death of Christensen in 1967. Just before the change in ownership, VG was mostly sold in the Oslo area and had a circulation of 34,000 copies.

The editor-in-chief is Gard Steiro. VG is not affiliated with any political party. It stands for liberal values.

For many years, VG was the largest newspaper in Norway by circulation, which reached a peak of 390,000 in 2002. As its readers moved from traditional newspapers to internet newspapers, the circulation had collapsed to 94,000 in 2016. VG is now the second-largest print newspaper in Norway. It was overtaken by Aftenposten in 2010. The online newspaper vg.no is, however, by far the most visited in Norway, with 2 million daily readers.

== VG Nett ==
VG Nett is VG's news site online. It was started in 1995. VG Nett made a net operating profit of 40 percent in 2006, making it an unusually successful online media operation. According to figures from TNG Gallup, it had approximately 2 million daily readers in 2016.

VG's web pages also include a discussion forum, VG Debatt.

== Circulation ==
Numbers from the Norwegian Media Businesses' Association, Mediebedriftenes Landsforening.

Circulation of the printed newspaper VG 1980–2017

The daily number of readers of the internet newspaper vg.no 1996–2016
- 1980: 200,536
- 1981: 227,191
- 1982: 240,302
- 1983: 256,747
- 1984: 269,140
- 1985: 290,705
- 1986: 317,049
- 1987: 333,698
- 1988: 345,636
- 1989: 360,331
- 1990: 367,036
- 1991: 365,318
- 1992: 374,092
- 1993: 377,575
- 1994: 386,137
- 1995: 371,238
- 1996: 356,861
- 1997: 370,115
- 1998: 364,619
- 1999: 373,552
- 2000: 375,983
- 2001: 387,508
- 2002: 390,510
- 2003: 380,190
- 2004: 365,266
- 2005: 343,703
- 2006: 315,549
- 2007: 309,610
- 2008: 284,414
- 2009: 262,374
- 2010: 233,295
- 2011: 211,588
- 2012: 188,345
- 2013: 164,430
- 2014: 138,188
- 2015: 112,716
- 2016: 93,883
- 2017: 82,015
- 2018: 96,405

== VGTV ==
VGTV
- Country: Norway
- Broadcast area: Norway
- Headquarters: Oslo

Programming
- Language: Norwegian Bokmål
- Picture format: HDTV

Ownership
- Owner: Schibsted

History
- Founded: November 2014
- Founder: VG

VGTV, sometimes unofficially called VG TV, is the name of two different video services run by VG: One service on their websites along with apps for Android, iOS, and tvOS, and one service on basic cable TV and IPTV. The two of them have some differences, but contain similarities to one another.

The web service contains free of charge news reports and clips; documentaries and comedy shows through the VG+ subscription; and sports matches through the additional VG+ Sport tier.

The TV channel focuses mostly on documentaries at no extra cost, interspersed with short news and weather reports. The channel is available from Norwegian cable TV and satellite providers, but not from RiksTV.

== Moniker ==
Logo of the moniker

Heia Norge ("Go, Norway!") is a moniker in Verdens Gang. Its purpose has been to unveil and ridicule elements of Norwegian bureaucracy, laws and regulations not favored by Verdens Gang. The moniker has been used by active politicians who themselves have tried to point out unwanted regulations.

== See also ==
- Heia Norge, a moniker used by the paper
- List of Norwegian newspapers
