= Petter Henriksen =

Norwegian musician and publisher (born 1949)

- Born: 30 November 1949 (age 76); Brooklyn
- Education: University of Oslo
- Occupations: Musician and publisher
- Mother: Vera Henriksen
- Relatives: Ragnvald Alfred Roscher Lund (grandfather)
- Awards: Spellemannprisen (1975; as member of Stiftelsen)

Petter Henriksen (born 30 November 1949) is a Norwegian musician and publisher.

== Personal life ==
Henriksen was born in Brooklyn on 30 November 1949, and graduated with a degree in music from the University of Oslo.

== Musical career ==
Henriksen was a co-founder of the song group Stiftelsen in 1971 (originally named Loelvens Stiftelse). The group's debut album Kva hjelp det å syngje from 1974 was awarded Spellemannprisen in 1975. He later collaborated with singer and songwriter Kari Bremnes, and composed the melodies for her albums Mitt ville hjerte (1987) and Blå krukke (1989). The album Mitt ville hjerte was Bremnes' first solo album, it consisted of songs based on poems by Tove Ditlevsen with melodies by Henriksen, and was awarded Spellemannprisen.

== Publishing career ==
Henriksen was assigned with the publishing house Kunnskapsforlaget from 1977. From 1983 he was assigned as chief editor for the publishing house Hjemmet bokforlag, where he was main editor of the encyclopedia Damms store leksikon. From 1992 he again worked for Kunnskapsforlaget, and was editor-in-chief for the third and fourth editions of the Great Norwegian Encyclopedia from 1995 to 2010.

He was then project leader for Det Norske Akademis ordbok, a digital dictionary based on Norsk Riksmålsordbok, issued by the Norwegian Academy.
