= Tanums store rettskrivningsordbok =

Norwegian dictionary

Tanums store rettskrivningsordbok is a Norwegian Bokmål dictionary. It was first published by the publishing house Johan Grundt Tanums forlag in 1940 as Norsk Rettskrivningsordbok. The 10th and latest edition was published in 2015.

== Initial edition ==
The work was initiated by philologist Jakob Sverdrup in 1936, who edited the dictionary until his death in 1938. After his death linguist and educator Marius Sandvei took over the responsibility as editor. The first edition of the dictionary was published in 1940 by the publishing house Johan Grundt Tanums forlag, with the title Norsk Rettskrivningsordbok.

== Later editions ==
Later editions of the dictionary are called Tanums store rettskrivningsordbok, and are also referred to as Tanum or Sverdrup-Sandvei. Co-editor from 1974 was Bernt Fossestøl, who died in 1988. Sandvei died in 1993. Boye Wangensteen was responsible for the 8th edition from 1996. He was also responsible for the 9th edition from 2005. The dictionary contains around 300,000 words, including compound words, foreign words, geographical names and technical terms. The latest edition is updated according to the normative changes which were effective from 1 July 2005, and is vetted by the Norwegian Language Council. From 1983 the dictionary has been issued by the publishing house Kunnskapsforlaget, along with other dictionaries such as Bokmålsordboka, Norsk ordbok and Norsk Riksmålsordbok, and the encyclopedia Store Norske Leksikon. The dictionary is recommended by the Norwegian Ministry of Culture as a consultative help when making new official names of Governmental bodies, institutions or companies. The dictionary has a long-term record as an important aid, almost a must, for solvers of crossword puzzles, and also for puzzle makers. The 8th edition from 1996 was accompanied with a CD-ROM version of the dictionary. The electronic version was also included on the CD-ROM Norsk Språk, along with other dictionaries. The 1989 edition is notorious for being printed with an erroneous word-division in the title printed on the book's spine.
