= Egil Tveterås =

Norwegian encyclopedist (1925–2021)

- Born: 4 November 1925; Oslo, Norway
- Died: 16 January 2021 (aged 95)
- Education: Temple University; University of Oslo
- Occupations: encyclopedist, literary historian
- Father: Harald L. Tveterås
- Relatives: Vilhelm Tveteraas (uncle); Signe Hofgaard (aunt)

Egil Tveterås (4 November 1925 – 16 January 2021) was a Norwegian encyclopedist, publicist and literary historian.

== Personal life and education ==
Born in Oslo on 4 November 1925, Tveterås was a son of Harald L. Tveterås. Thus painter Vilhelm Tveteraas and dancer and choreographer Signe Hofgaard were his uncle and aunt.

He graduated as Bachelor of Arts from the Temple University in 1947, and attained the post-graduate degrees of candidata philologiae (Candidate of Arts and Letters) and magister artium (Magister of the Arts), similar to the Masters degree (M.A.) and the Ph.D. (doctor of philosophy) from the University of Oslo in 1952.

== Career ==
Tveterås was editorial secretary for the magazine Samtiden from 1954 to 1975. He was assigned to the publishing house Aschehoug from 1955 to 1975, where he was editorial secretary for the encyclopedia FOKUS − Illustrert familieleksikon (1958−1961), and chief editor for the fifth edition of the encyclopedia Aschehougs konversasjonsleksikon from 1968 to 1973. From 1975 to 1992 he was chief editor in the publishing house Kunnskapsforlaget.

After his retirement in 1992, he wrote volume four of Den norske bokhandels historie.

Tveterås died on 16 January 2021, at the age of 95.
