= Bokmålsordboka =

Dictionary for Norwegian Bokmål

Bokmålsordboka (Urban East Norwegian: [ˈbûːkmoːɫsˌuːrbuːkɑ]) is a dictionary of the Norwegian written language called Bokmål (lit. "book language"). It was published by the Department of Linguistics and Scandinavian Studies at the University of Oslo in cooperation with the Norwegian Language Council. On June 15th 2016 it was moved to the University of Bergen. The work on the dictionary commenced in 1974 and the first edition was published in 1986. The printed dictionary was published by Kunnskapsforlaget, and the dictionary was also available online at the website of the University of Oslo. Today it is only published online.

Bokmålsordboka is one of several dictionaries of Bokmål or Riksmål. Other dictionaries published by Kunnskapsforlaget include Norsk Riksmålsordbok, Norsk ordbok and Riksmålsordlisten. Bokmålsordboka is a normative dictionary of Bokmål, covering both conservative (moderate) and non-conservative (radical) Bokmål. The normative dictionary of Riksmål is Riksmålsordlisten. Norsk ordbok is covering both Riksmål and Moderate Bokmål, while Norsk Riksmålsordbok is a descriptive dictionary, documenting all (non-Nynorsk) Norwegian language usage.

== Bibliography ==
- Bokmålsordboka. Definisjons- og rettskrivningsordbok. Oslo: Kunnskapsforlaget 2005. 3. utgave, 2. opplag. 1218 s.
