= Tveteraas =

Tveteraas is a surname. Notable people with the surname include:

- Rasmus Tveteraas (1862–1938), Norwegian schoolteacher, school inspector and politician
- Signe Hofgaard Tveteraas (1901–1998), Norwegian dancer, choreographer and organizational leader
- Vilhelm Tveteraas (1898–1972), Norwegian printmaker, painter and illustrator
