= Nils Kåre Jacobsen =

Norwegian publisher

- Born: 20 February 1929; Bergen, Norway
- Died: 30 October 2008 (aged 79); Bærum
- Occupation: Publisher

Nils Kåre Jacobsen (20 February 1929 – 30 October 2008) was a Norwegian publisher.

He was born in Bergen to Oscar Jacobsen and Ragna Walde, and married Berit Scherven in 1957. He died in Bærum in 2008.

Jacobsen graduated from the Norwegian School of Economics in 1951. He was manager of the publishing house Gyldendal Norsk Forlag from 1990 to 1995. He was member of the board of the Norwegian Publishers' Association from 1962 to 1972, and from 1990 to 1995. He was chairman of the board of De norske Bokklubbene, Kunnskapsforlaget and Tiden Norsk Forlag. Among his books are Med Rieber gjennom 75 år (1954), Bak kobberdøren. Gyldendal 1925–1975 from 1975, and biographies on Sigurd Hoel, Harald Grieg and Agnar Mykle.
