= Det Norske Akademis ordbok =

Online dictionary of the Norwegian language

Det Norske Akademis ordbok (literally 'Dictionary of the Norwegian Academy'), abbreviated NAOB, is one of the largest dictionaries of the Norwegian language and covers its most widely used written variety, Bokmål/Riksmål, which is used by around 90% of Norwegians. It was published as a freely available online dictionary in 2018 by the Norwegian Academy and Kunnskapsforlaget with support from the Parliament of Norway. Knut Olav Åmås has described the dictionary as the Norwegian counterpart of Svenska Akademiens ordbok and the Oxford English Dictionary.

The dictionary is based on Norsk Riksmålsordbok, which was published in six volumes between 1937 and 1995, and the development of Det Norske Akademis ordbok on the basis of this work started in the late 1990s. In 2018 Minister of Culture Trine Skei Grande said the work is of key importance to the preservation of the Norwegian language in the long term.
