= Norsk Ordbok =

Norsk Ordbok ('Norwegian dictionary') may refer to:

- Norsk Ordbok (Nynorsk), a comprehensive dictionary of written Norwegian Nynorsk and dialectwords
- Store norske ordbok, a written Norwegian dictionary in the Riksmål form of Norwegian
