= Ibsen's Kingdom: The Man and His Works =

2021 book about Henrik Ibsen by Evert M. Sprinchorn

- Author: Evert M. Sprinchorn
- Publisher: Yale University Press
- Publication date: 2021
- Pages: 704

Ibsen's Kingdom: The Man and His Works is a book about Henrik Ibsen and his works by Evert M. Sprinchorn (1923–2022), an American Scandinavian literature scholar. It was published by Yale University Press in 2021 when Sprinchorn was 98. It is described as a biography and more specifically as a biographical reading of Ibsen's plays.

The book was criticized by Norwegian Ibsen scholars, in particular by Ellen Rees for perpetuating outdated and debunked myths about Ibsen. Helge Rønning argued that "in many ways it is more an inventive analysis of Ibsen’s works than a biography." Its approach of using Ibsen's plays as biographical sources has been criticized in recent Ibsen scholarship. However, Eivind Tjønneland argues that "for someone interested in Ibsen's literature, Sprinchorn's biography is far more interesting to read than, for example, Michael Meyer's. Sprinchorn is also much better versed in literary history than Ivo de Figueiredo and Sverre Mørkhagen, who have written the two latest Ibsen biographies in Norwegian. And without an interest in drama, one would not read an Ibsen biography." The book was positively reviewed by American scholars.
