= 1945 Norwegian parliamentary election =

- 8 October 1945

All 150 seats in the Norwegian Parliament 76 seats were needed for a majority
- Turnout: 76.4% ▼7.6%
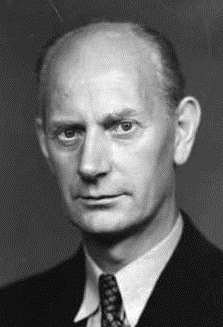

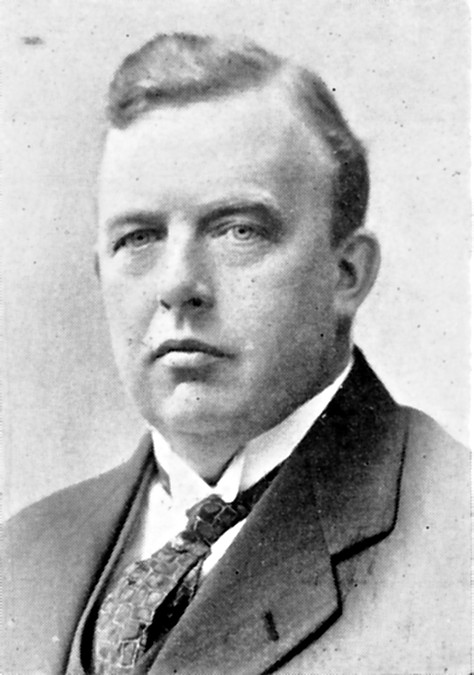

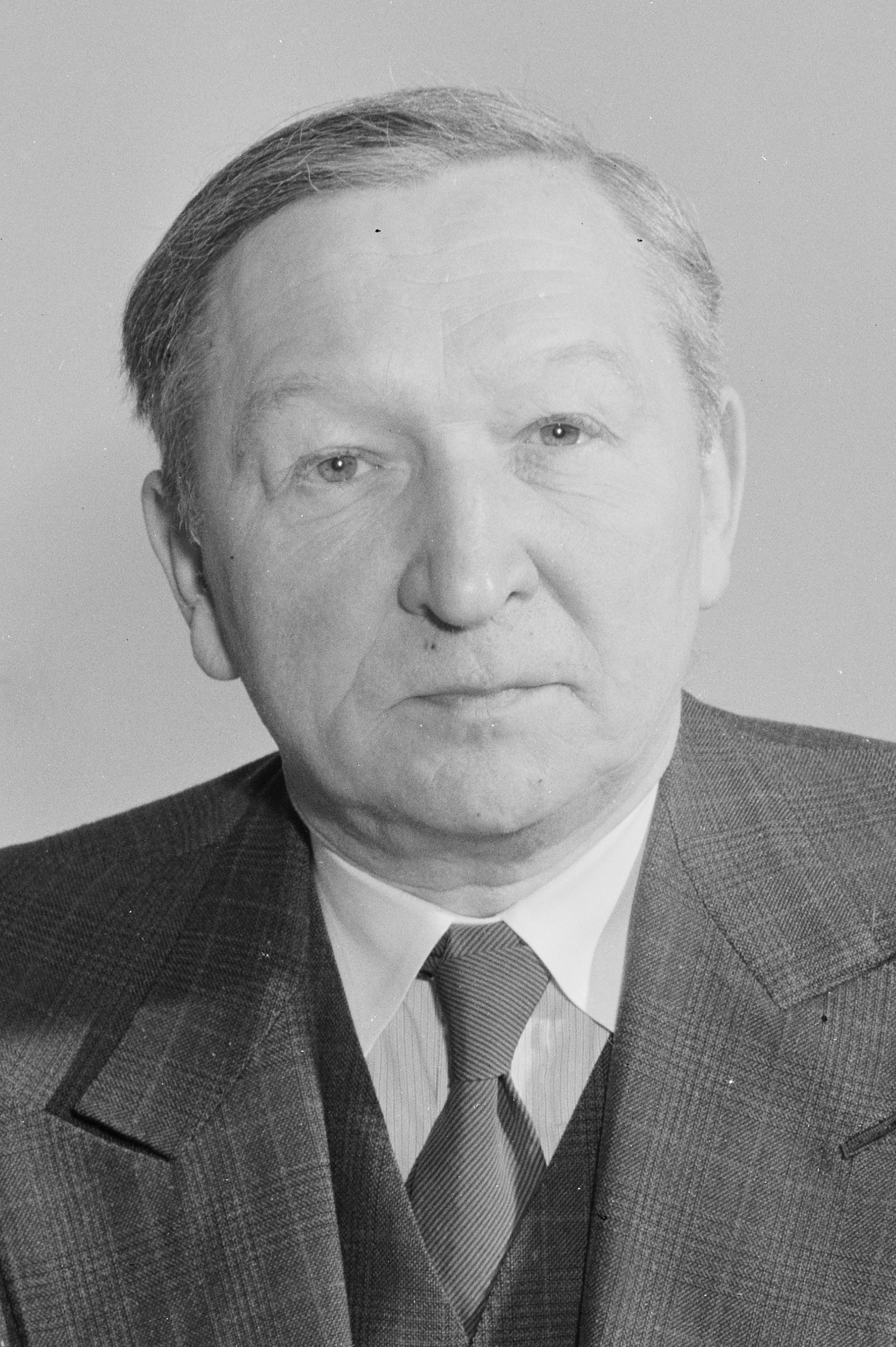

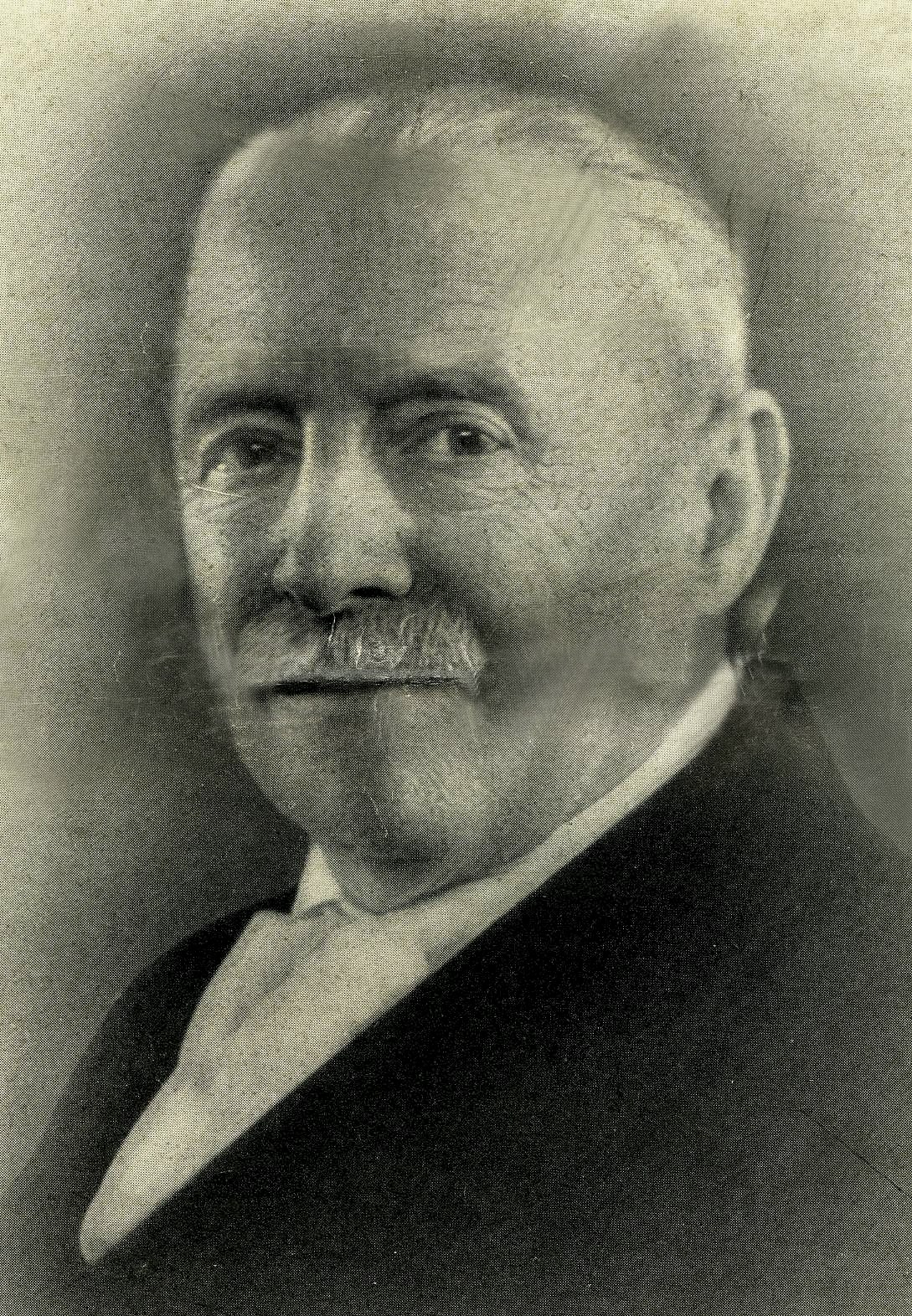

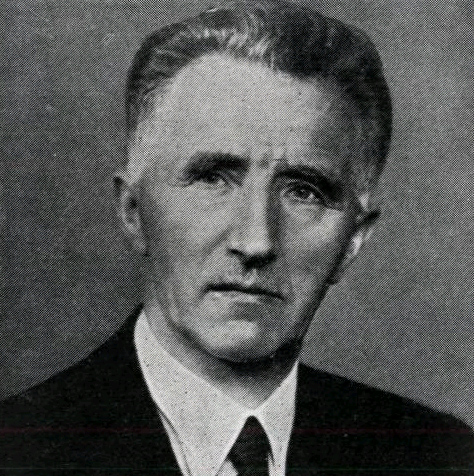

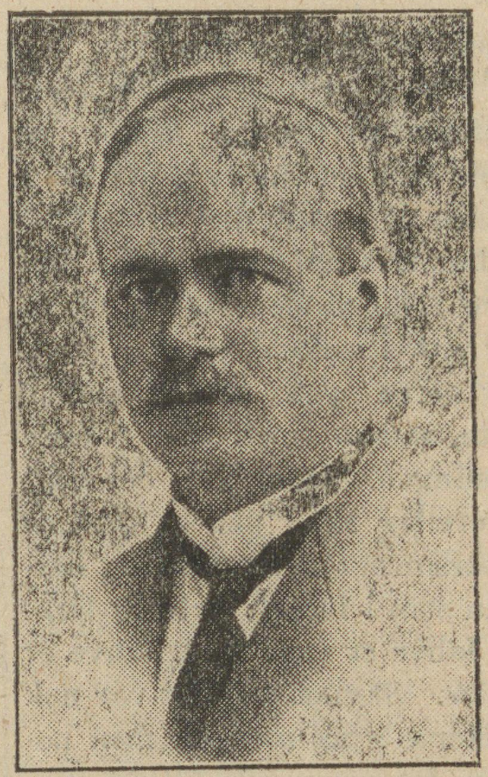
	First party	Second party	Third party
Leader	Einar Gerhardsen	Arthur Nordlie	Jacob Worm-Müller
Party	Labour	Conservative	Liberal
Last election	70 seats, 42.51%	36 seats, 21.32%	23 seats, 16.00%
Seats won	76	25	20
Seat change	▲6	▼11	▼3
Popular vote	609,348	252,608	204,852
Percentage	41.03%	17.01%	13.8%
Swing	▼1.48 pp	▼4.31 pp	▼2.21 pp
	Fourth party	Fifth party	Sixth party
Leader	Adam Egede-Nissen	Nils Trædal	Nils Lavik
Party	Communist	Farmers'	Christian; Democratic
Last election	0 seats, 0.30%	18 seats, 11.55%	2 seat, 1.35%
Seats won	11	10	8
Seat change	▲11	▼8	▲6
Popular vote	176,535	119,362	117,813
Percentage	11.89%	8.04%	7.93%
Swing	▲11.59 pp	▼3.51 pp	▲6.58 pp
- Results by county
Prime Minister before election
Einar Gerhardsen
Labour
Prime Minister after election
Einar Gerhardsen
Labour

Parliamentary elections were held in Norway on 8 October 1945, the first following World War II and the end of the German occupation. The result was a victory for the Labour Party, which won 76 of the 150 seats in the Storting, the first time a party had won a majority since the 1915 elections.

== Contesting parties ==
Name		Ideology	Position	Leader	1936 result	
Name		Ideology	Position	Leader	Votes (%)	Seats
Ap	Labour Party; Arbeiderpartiet	Social democracy	Centre-left	Einar Gerhardsen	42.5%	70 / 150
H	Conservative Party; Høyre	Conservatism	Centre-right	Arthur Nordlie	21.3%	36 / 150
V	Liberal Party; Venstre	Social liberalism	Centre	Jacob Worm-Müller	16.0%	23 / 150
Bp	Farmer's Party; Bondepartiet	Agrarianism	Centre	Nils Trædal	11.5%	18 / 150
KrF	Christian Democratic Party; Kristelig Folkeparti	Christian democracy	Centre to centre-right	Nils Lavik	1.3%	2 / 150

== Results ==
Party	Votes	%	Seats	+/–
Labour Party	609,348	41.03	76	+6
Conservative Party	252,608	17.01	25	–11
Liberal Party	204,852	13.79	20	–3
Communist Party	176,535	11.89	11	+11
Farmers' Party	119,362	8.04	10	–8
Christian Democratic Party	117,813	7.93	8	+6
New Norway	1,845	0.12	0	–1
Other parties	2,809	0.19	0	–
Wild votes	53	0.00	–	–
Total	1,485,225	100.00	150	0
Valid votes	1,485,225	99.13		
Invalid/blank votes	12,969	0.87		
Total votes	1,498,194	100.00		
Registered voters/turnout	1,961,977	76.36		
Source: Nohlen & Stöver

=== Seat distribution ===
Constituency	Total seats	Seats won					
Constituency	Total seats	Ap	H	V	K	B	KrF
Akershus	7	3	2		1		1
Aust-Agder	4	2	1	1			
Bergen	5	2	1	1	1		
Buskerud	5	3	1		1		
Finnmark	3	2			1		
Hedmark	7	4	1		1	1	
Hordaland	8	3	1	2			2
Market towns of Akershus and Østfold	4	2	1		1		
Market towns of Buskerud	3	2	1				
Market towns of Hedmark and Oppland	3	2	1				
Market towns of Møre og Romsdal	3	2	1				
Market towns of Nordland, Troms and Finnmark	4	2	1		1		
Market towns of Sør-Trøndelag and Nord-Trøndelag	5	3	1		1		
Market towns of Telemark and Aust-Agder	5	2	1	1	1		
Market towns of Vest-Agder and Rogaland	7	4	1	2			
Market towns of Vestfold	4	2	2				
Møre og Romsdal	7	2		2		1	2
Nord-Trøndelag	5	3		1		1	
Nordland	8	4	2	1	1		
Oppland	6	3		1		2	
Oslo	7	4	2		1		
Østfold	6	3	1			1	1
Rogaland	5	2	1	1		1	
Sogn og Fjordane	5	2		2		1	
Sør-Trøndelag	6	3		1		1	1
Telemark	5	3		1			1
Troms	5	4		1			
Vest-Agder	4	1		2		1	
Vestfold	4	2	2				
Total	150	76	25	20	11	10	8
Source: Norges Offisielle Statistikk
