= Riksmålsordlisten =

Norwegian dictionary

Riksmålsordlisten (Urban East Norwegian: [ˈrɪ̀ksmoːɫsˌuːrlɪstn̩]) is a normative dictionary of the non-official Norwegian written language called Riksmål. It is published by Kunnskapsforlaget (since the 7th edition) in cooperation with Riksmålsforbundet and officially approved by the Norwegian Academy for Language and Literature. It was first published in 1952.

== Bibliography ==
- Riksmålsordliste til daglig bruk, Riksmålsforbundet, Dreyer, 1952, 1st ed., 109 pages
- Riksmålsordliste til daglig bruk, Riksmålsforbundet, Dreyer, 1956, 2nd revised ed., 111 pages
- Riksmålsordliste til daglig bruk, Riksmålsforbundet, Dreyer, 1958, 3rd revised ed., 111 pages
- Riksmålsordlisten, Riksmålsforbundet, 1973, 5th ed., 215 pages
- Riksmålsordlisten, Riksmålsforbundet, 1976, 5th ed., 2nd revision., 223 pages
- Riksmålsordlisten, ed. Tor Guttu, Grøndahl og Dreyer, 1994, 6th ed., 233 pages, ISBN 978-82-504-2179-0
- Riksmålsordlisten, ed. Tor Guttu, Kunnskapsforlaget, 2007, 7th ed., 270 pages, ISBN 978-82-573-1919-9
