= Kristenn Einarsson =

Icelandic-Norwegian publisher

Kristenn Einarsson, 2023

Kristenn Einarsson (born 16 June 1950) is an Icelandic-Norwegian publisher.

He was born in Reykjavík, and graduated in economics in 1974. He became the chief executive of Den norske Bokklubben in 1991, and chief executive of Kunnskapsforlaget in 2007. He retired in 2010, but returned in 2012 as managing director of the Norwegian Publishers' Association. He was the chairman of the board of Kunnskapsforlaget from 2000 to 2007, in the Norwegian Film Fund from 2001 to 2007 and the Norwegian Film Institute from 2008.
