= Aslak Sira Myhre =

Norwegian culture administrator (born 1973)

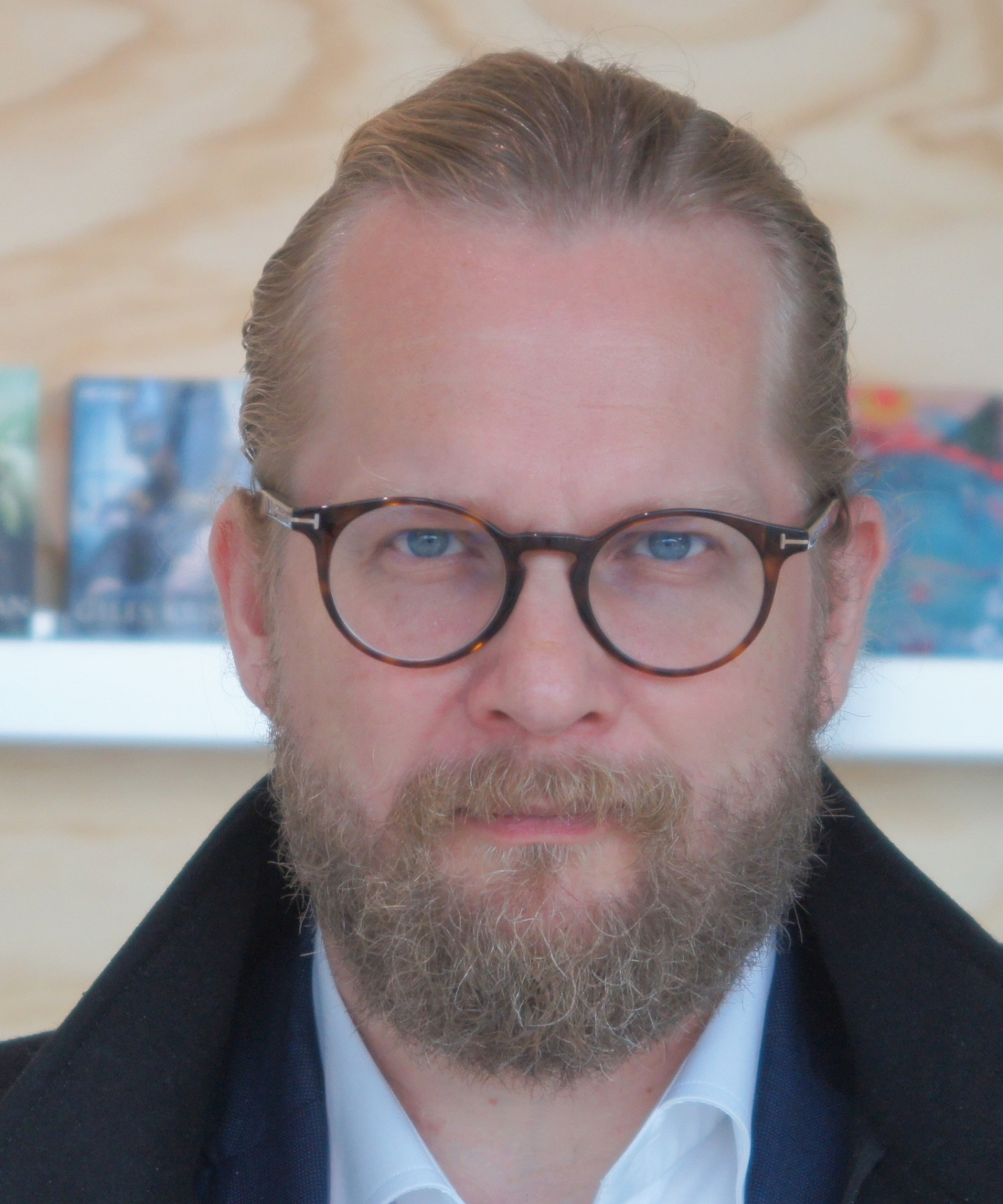
- Myhre in 2019
- Born: 28 May 1973 (age 52); Stavanger, Norway
- Occupation: Culture administrator
- Spouse: Cathrine Sandnes

Aslak Sira Myhre (born 28 May 1973 in Stavanger) is a Norwegian culture administrator. Since 2014, he is director of the National Library of Norway. Myhre has been a left-wing politician, and was for a period leader of the former party Red Electoral Alliance (RV). In the local election in Oslo in 2015, he was listed for Red, the party succeeding Red Electoral Alliance since 2007, however, not on top, and he did not get a seat.

Myhre's parents were both active on the political left and his father Eldar Myhre is a known trade union chairman at Aker Kværner. Aslak was very active in student demonstrations at the University of Bergen during the 1990s and sat on the university board in 1996. He was the party leader of Red Electoral Alliance between 1997 and 2003, and sat in the city council in his home city Stavanger between 1999 and 2003. He was the top candidate for Storting for Rogaland in the 1997 election and Oslo in the 2001 election, but his party failed to win any seats.

Leaving national politics, he became an executive of !Les, an association to stimulate children and youth to read more. Myhre has also worked as a football journalist for both the Norwegian Broadcasting Corporation and Klassekampen. In 2006, he started as director for the House of Literature in Oslo. The House of Literature opened in 2007, it is Europes largest and has more than 250.000 visitors annually. In 2014, he was appointed director of the National Library.

For his work with !les and The House of Literature, Myhre in 2008 received "Eckbos legaters Kulturpris". Myhre has published several books, and has published articles in The Guardian and The Washington Post in the aftermath of the 2011 Norway attacks.

He is married to current editor-in-chief of Samtiden, Cathrine Sandnes.

== Controversy ==
He was in 2002 convicted to 90 days in prison for failing to report for national military service. On appeal in 2003 his sentence was made suspended on probation. His case was controversial since Myhre had only political objection to serve national service due to Norwegian participation in NATO's out of area involvement and his refusal to classify himself as having objections to serve military national service. His objections were neither religious, moral nor ethical, which are the legal requirements for being granted civilian national service under Norwegian National Service laws.

Political offices
Preceded by Jørn Magdahl	Leader of Red Electoral Alliance; 1997–2003	Succeeded by Torstein Dahle
