= Cathrine Sandnes =

Norwegian journalist and journalist

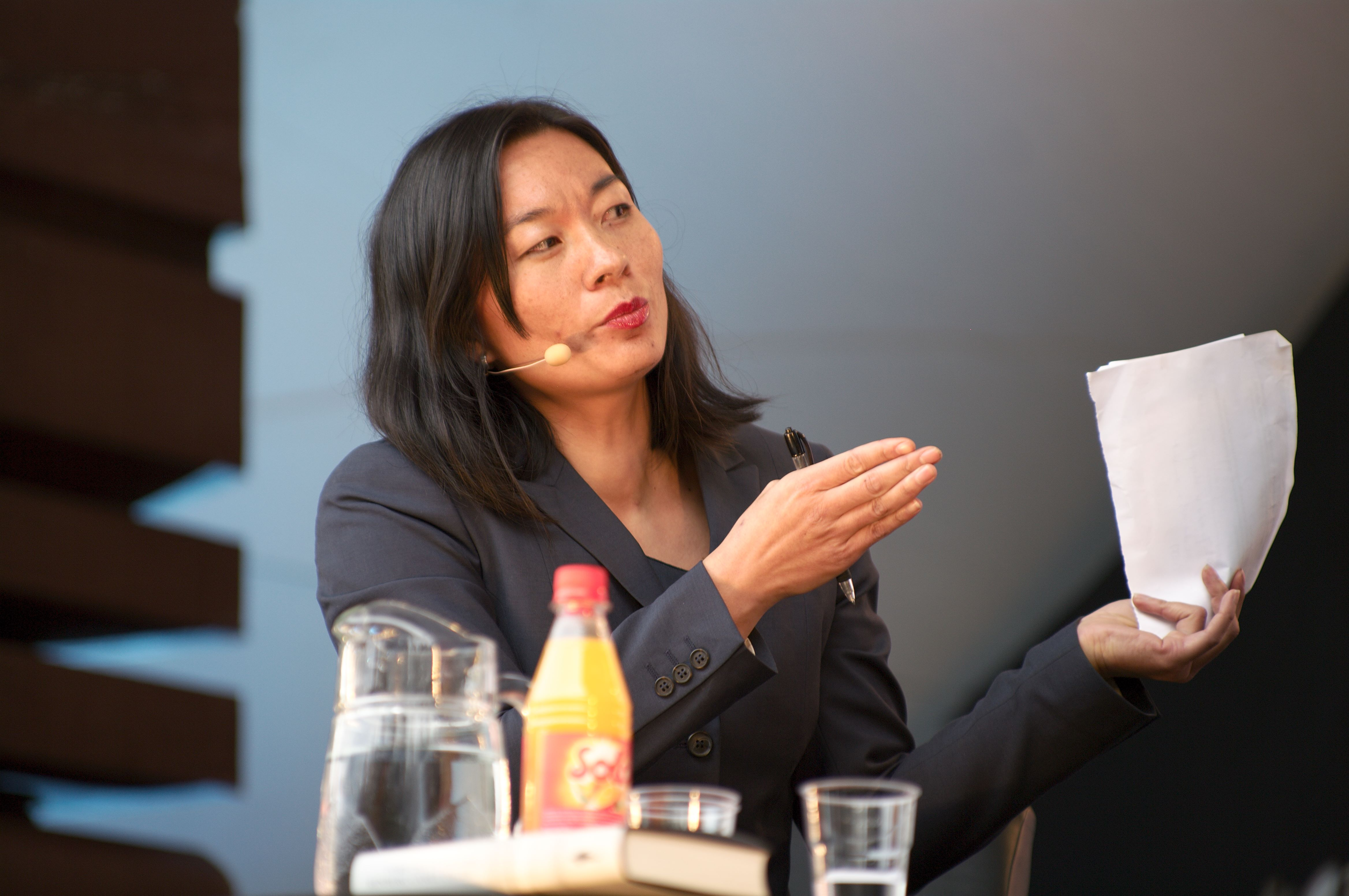
- Born: 19 March 1972 (age 54)
- Occupations: Journalist and magazine editor
- Spouse: Aslak Sira Myhre

Cathrine Sandnes (born 19 March 1972) is a Norwegian martial artist, journalist and magazine editor. She was born in Korea, and is married to politician Aslak Sira Myhre.

Sandnes served as editor-in-chief of the political and cultural magazine Samtiden from 2006 to 2014. From 2014 she was leader of the publishing house Manifest. She was assigned with Gyldendal Norsk Forlag from 2017 to 2019, and with the publishing house J.M. Stenersen from 2019. She assumed the position of secretary general for the Norwegian Non-Fiction Writers and Translators Association from January 2026.

Sandnes won a bronze medal at the 1994 W.A.K.O European amateur Championships in kickboxing in Finland. She won several National titles in the sport of karate, and was awarded the King's Cup in 2003.
