= Janss =

Janss may refer to:

- Janss (surname)
- Janss Marketplace, a shopping mall in Thousand Oaks, California
- Janss Investment Company, a defunct American real estate developer
  - Janss Investment Company Building
