= Universitas (newspaper) =

Weekly newspaper edited and written by students in Oslo, Norway

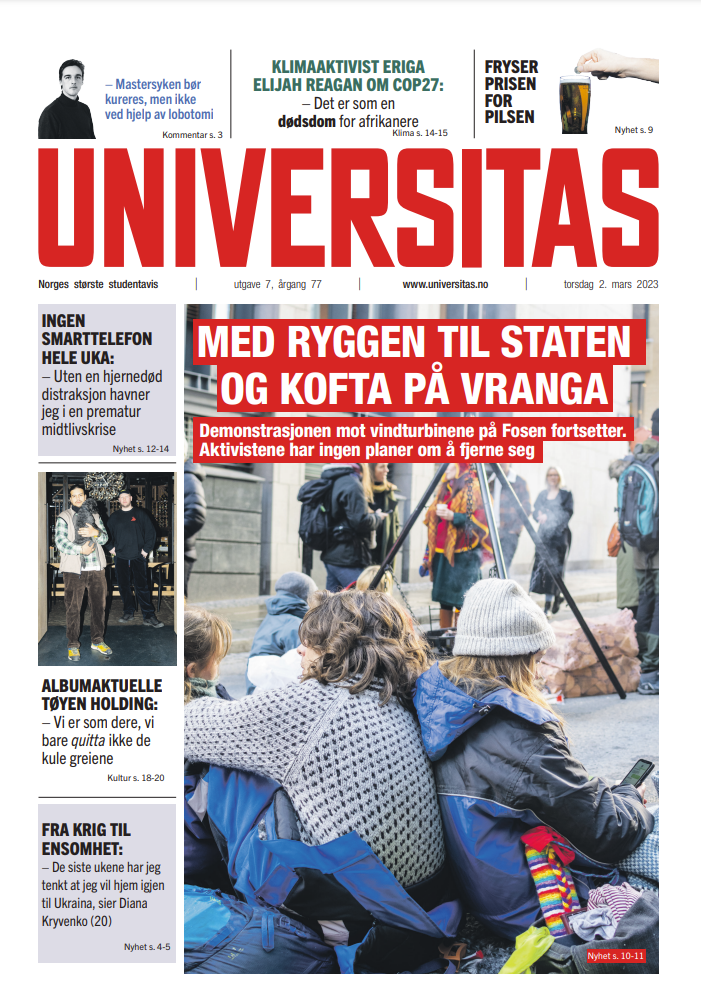
- Print edition of Universitas 2. of March 2023.
- Type: Weekly paper
- Format: Tabloid
- Publisher: Amedia
- Editor-in-chief: Dagny Mathilde Mohn
- Language: Norwegian, English
- Headquarters: University of Oslo
- Country: Norway
- Website: universitas.no

Universitas is a weekly newspaper edited and written by students in Oslo, Norway. It has its editorial offices at the University of Oslo and has been published every week since 1946. With a weekly circulation of 17,000 and 30 publications a year, as well as around 30,000 page viewings a week, Universitas is one of the largest student papers in Europe. It is distributed every Thursday morning on 28 places of higher learning in Oslo.

Universitas is publicly funded through the fiscal budget, and is partly paid for by the students' semester fee. It employs around 30 journalists and photographers paid per contribution as freelancers, in addition to a full time news editor and editor in chief. The paper also employs a full time chief operating officer. Current editor in chief is Dagny Mathilde Mohn. News editor is Thea Eide.

The newspaper has produced a large array of norwegian writers, journalists, critics, editors, as well as several members of the Norwegian Public Broadcasting Corporation.

== History ==
The publication's first editor was the to-be professor in literature and Henrik Ibsen expert, Daniel Haakonsen. In the early years, Universitas had an editorial council, where professor names like Arne Næss and Ragnar Frisch figured. In more recent years, many profiles from Norwegian media has started their careers in the newspaper, including Øystein Sørensen, Kjetil Rolness, Ivar Hippe and Tor Edvin Dahl. Many illustrators also began drawing for Universitas: Ellen Auensen, Christopher Nielsen, Mikael Holmberg, Ola A. Hegdal and Karine Haaland.

In 1990, the paper again boosted the publishing rate and became a weekly (in semesters); it had given out 9-16 editions per year since 1954. In 2004, it went up from 32 to 34 editions per year, and from 2009, it will publish 35 editions per year. The circulation is 17,000 copies.

Universitas receive funding from the Student Welfare Organisation in Oslo, granted through the Welfare Council, a welfare body put together by the local student democracies at institutions affiliated to the Student Welfare Organisation. Universitas is consequently distributed to all institutions affiliated to the Student Welfare Organisation, that is the University of Oslo, the Norwegian School of Management (BI), the Norwegian School of Sport Sciences (NIH), the Norwegian Academy of Music (NMH), the MF Norwegian School of Theology (MF), the Oslo School of Architecture and Design (AHO), the Oslo National Academy of the Arts (KHiO) and the Norwegian School of Veterinary Science (NVH).

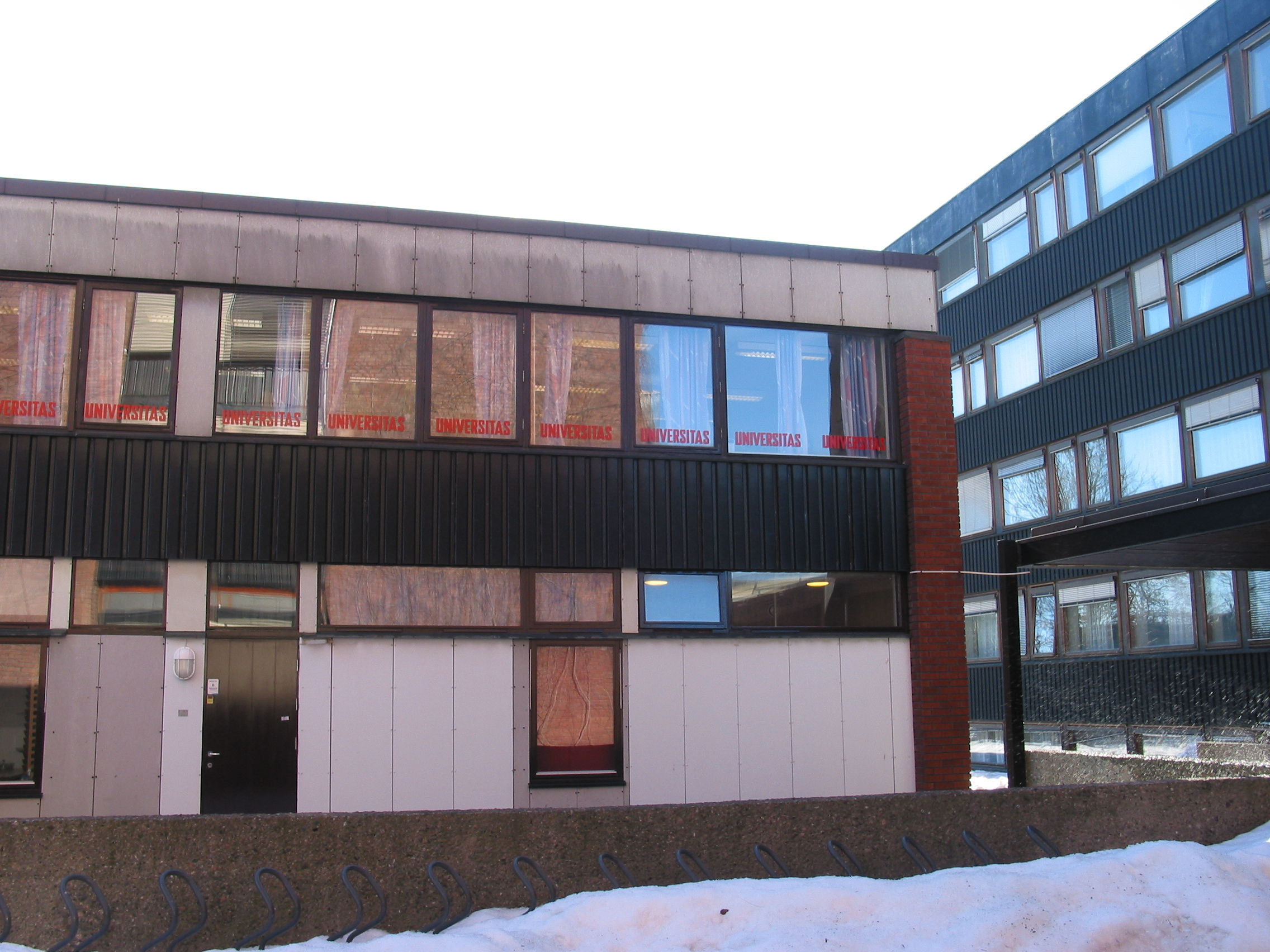
The newspaper headquarters at Blindern.

The chief editor is employed for one calendar year. The newspaper's location is in Moltke Moes vei at Blindern, the main campus of the University of Oslo.
