= Arnold Eidslott =

Norwegian poet (1926–2018)

Arnold Olav Eidslott (10 June 1926 – 19 April 2018) was a Norwegian poet.

He was born in Ålesund, and worked as a telegraphic engineer for the whole of his working life. From 1986 to 2018 he was the poet laureate.

Eidslott's Christian religion was central to his lyrics, and he was foremost in Norwegian religious literature. He was a member of the Norwegian Academy for Language and Literature. He died on 19 April 2018 at the age of 91.

Johan Kvandal's composition "Underet in three parts, is based on Eidslott's poem of the same name. The parts that have been written are: "Krusifikset blør", "Josef av Arimateas klage" and "Den tomme grav".

== Bibliography ==
- Vinden taler til den døve – poem (1953)
- Vann og støv – poem (1956)
- Kronen av røk – poem (1959)
- Av dynd og Amazonas – poem (1963)
- Manes – poem (1965)
- Memento – poem (1967)
- Elegisk om sirkus – poem (1970)
- Ved midnatt da havet sank – poem (1971)
- Rekviem for Lasarus – poem (1973)
- Veien til Astapovo – poem (1976)
- Det forlatte øyeblikk – poem (1978)
- Den tause ambassadør – poem (1980)
- Flukten til katakombene – poem (1982)
- Adam imago Dei – poem (1984)
- Dikt i utvalg – (1986)
- Advarsel i kode – poem (1987)
- De navnløses kor – poem (1989)
- Under San Marcos murer – poem (1991)
- Lyset over den dømte – poem (1993)
- Pax Christi – poem (1995)
- Passchendaeles ruiner – poem (1998)
- Nettene under Kapp Horn – poem (2000)
- Davids nøkkel – poem (2001)
- Arameisk i Roma – poem (2002)
- Koret over Forum Romanum – poem (2004)
- Lyset fra Bach – poem (2006)
- Vinden blåser dit den vil – poems (2008)
- Postludium – poems (2012)

== Prizes ==
- Gyldendal's Endowment 1963
- Det Norske Akademis Pris 1983
- Aschehougprisen 1983
- Dobloug Prize 1992

== Works about the poet ==
Asbjørn Aarnes and Helge Nordahl (ed.) (2000): "Hellig hav: om Arnold Eidslotts diktning". Oslo: Verbum.
