= Trygve Knudsen =

Norwegian philologist, linguist and lexicographer

Trygve Kristofer Knudsen
- Born: 23 June 1897 Norway Tønsberg
- Died: 18 January 1968 (70) Norway Oslo
- Occupation: philologist, professor, linguist, lexicographer

Trygve Knudsen (23 June 1897 – 18 January 1968) was a Norwegian philologist, linguist and lexicographer.

== Personal life ==
Knudsen was born in Tønsberg as the son of lawyer Knud Peder Knudsen (1863–1937) and Henriette von Lachmann Mørck (1867–1923). He married Grethe Tønnessen in 1925.

== Career ==
Knudsen finished his secondary education in Tønsberg 1916, and enrolled in philology at the University of Kristiania. He took the cand.philol. degree in 1923, and his thesis was issued as a book, titled P. A. Munch og samtidens norske målstræv. Between 1925 and 1930 he worked as a university research fellow, and later as a teacher in Aker and Oslo. From 1935 he worked as a teacher at Oslo Cathedral School, until 1946, when he started lecturing at the university. He was appointed professor at the University of Oslo in 1954, and kept this position until he retired in 1967.

Knudsen was co-editor of the dictionary Norsk Riksmålsordbok from 1925, together with Alf Sommerfelt, who had started the work in 1922. The first parts of the dictionary were published in 1930, and the dictionary work was completed in 1957. After publishing the dictionary, the editors started working on a supplementary volume. As Sommerfelt died in 1965, and Knudsen died in 1968, their work was completed by Harald Noreng, who also had been co-editor of volume four of the dictionary. The two supplementary volumes of Norsk Riksmålsordbok (labeled V and VI) were issued in 1995.

Knudsen was co-editor of the magazine Maal og Minne from 1951. He wrote the book Gammelnorsk Homiliebok in 1952. He was chairman for the Norwegian Language Committee (Norsk Språknemnd) from 1956 to 1957. He wrote articles on city dialects in general, and more specifically on dialects in Oslo and Tønsberg. He was a radio speaker, especially on the subject "Norwegian language", and he held guest lectures at the universities of Bergen, Lund, Uppsala and Gothenburg. He was also a literary critic.

Knudsen received an honorary degree at the Stockholm University in 1960.
