= Store norske ordbok =

Norwegian dictionary edited by Tor Guttu

The Norsk Ordbok (Riksmål) (full title Norsk Ordbok; riksmål og moderat bokmål) is a written Norwegian dictionary in the Riksmål form of Norwegian (or moderate Bokmål). It was first published in 1991. An illustrated edition was published by Kunnskapsforlaget in 1993 under the title Norsk Illustrert Ordbok (Norwegian Illustrated Dictionary), and was first edited by Tor Guttu.

Riksmål is an unofficial Norwegian language form developed in Norway during the 19th and 20th centuries. It is based on the Danish-Norwegian language tradition which utilizes Danish writing and Norwegian speech. The language had spelling reforms in 1907 and 1917.

== Store norske ordbok ==
Aschehoug og Gyldendals Store norske ordbok was published in 1991 as an appendix to the general encyclopedia Aschehoug og Gyldendals Store norske leksikon, meant for the same customers and in the same binding and layout. To write this dictionary, editor Tor Guttu used the Norsk Riksmålsordbok, which adhered to the riksmål written form of Norwegian, but added "moderate bokmål" forms as well as general updates. As bokmål and riksmål were an official (maintained by the Norwegian Language Council and unofficial (maintained by the Norwegian Academy) respectively, Guttu employed a small triangle to showcase words that were not included in bokmål. Around 800 entries were illustrated.

Sverre Klouman hailed the dictionary for bridging the riksmål and bokmål forms, since the two had converged in real life. The definitions, examples of usage and pronunciation guides were exemplary, the dictionary would guide the user to choose words based on style or to vary their choice of words, and it was easy to gain an overview of the work. Klouman surmised that this could be "the dictionary with a capital D" and asked if this was "Norway's Larousse". Klouman found the illustrations somewhat dull, and that the physical weight of the dictionary was too large. Similarly, Kjetil Wiedsvang in Dagens Næringsliv called the format of the 689-page dictionary "unmanageable", but that it "slides well into the bookshelf next to Store Norske Leksikon".

Arnold Thoresen in Språknytt praised the dictionary as "a grand work" for the same reasons as Klouman, but provided more than a dozen examples of lemmas that had been omitted. [[ Lars Roar Langslet]] also used the term "grand work", as well as "immeasurably valuable", and praised its size and up-to-date scope. Langslet's only criticism was the illustrations, which he found to be "of varying quality, and sometimes verging involuntary comical", as well as accompanying fairly arbitrary lemmas.

== Norsk illustrert ordbok ==
In 1993, a new edition of Store norske ordbok came under the title Norsk illustrert ordbok. Still edited by Tor Guttu, the size was smaller, increasing the page count to 1,025.

== See also ==
- Norsk Ordbok (Nynorsk)
