= Ordnett =

Norwegian online dictionary service

- Website type: Reference work Online dictionary
- Available in: Norwegian; English
- Headquarters: {{{location_country}}}
- Owner: Kunnskapsforlaget
- Website: ordnett.no
- Registration: Paywall
- Launched: 2004

Ordnett is a Norwegian online dictionary service, published and maintained by Kunnskapsforlaget, a privately held publishing house. Ordnett offers access to 50 dictionaries, covering 11 languages. This makes it the largest, commercially available dictionary database in Norway. Thirteen of the dictionaries are either oneway or twoway English (with Norwegian being the opposite language), including 3 publications from Oxford University Press.

Ordnett is available through an ordinary web browser. It is a subscription based service, offering annual or monthly subscriptions.

== Dictionaries ==
- Norwegian Dictionary
- Dictionary of Foreign Words
- Norwegian Dictionary of Synonyms
- Orthographic Dictionary of Nynorsk
- Orthographic Dictionary of Bokmål
- Norwegian Dictionary of Antonyms and Synonyms
- Bokmål-Nynorsk Dictionary
- Dictionary of Riksmål
- Medical Dictionary
- Encyclopedia of Law
- Norwegian-English Dictionary
- English-Norwegian Dictionary
- Norwegian-English Comprehensive Dictionary
- English-Norwegian Comprehensive Dictionary
- Norwegian-English Technical Dictionary
- English-Norwegian Technical Dictionary
- Norwegian-English Dictionary of Economics
- English-Norwegian Dictionary of Economics
- Norwegian-English Medical Dictionary
- English-Norwegian Medical Dictionary
- The Oxford Dictionary of English
- The Oxford Sentence Dictionary
- The Oxford Thesaurus of English
- The Oxford Dictionary of Quotations
- The Oxford Concise Medical Dictionary
- The Oxford Dictionary of Economics
- The Oxford Dictionary of Finance and Banking
- The Oxford Dictionary of Business and Management
- The Oxford Dictionary of Science
- Norwegian-Swedish Dictionary
- Swedish-Norwegian Dictionary
- Norwegian-French Dictionary
- French-Norwegian Dictionary
- Monolingual French Dictionary Le Robert
- Norwegian-Spanish Dictionary
- Spanish-Norwegian Dictionary
- Monolingual Spanish Dictionary Larousse
- Norwegian-German Dictionary
- German-Norwegian Dictionary
- Norwegian-German Technical Dictionary
- German-Norwegian Technical Dictionary
- Monolingual German Dictionary PONS
- Norwegian-Italian Dictionary
- Italian-Norwegian Dictionary
- Norwegian-Russian Dictionary
- Russian-Norwegian Dictionary
- Norwegian-Portuguese Dictionary
- Portuguese-Norwegian Dictionary
- Norwegian-Chinese Dictionary
- Chinese-Norwegian Dictionary
- Norwegian-Arabic Dictionary
- Arabic-Norwegian Dictionary

== History ==
Ordnett.no was launched in April 2004. In December 2007 Ordnett was made available as an offline service, called Ordnett Pluss. Both program and dictionary content is downloaded and installed on Windows computers. Like its online counterpart Ordnett Pluss is subscription based, depending on online renewal.
