= Marius Sandvei =

Norwegian linguist (1905–1993)

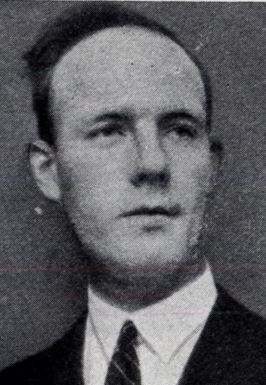
- Born: 15 January 1905; Trondheim, Norway
- Died: 1 November 1993 (aged 88)
- Occupations: Linguist and educator

Marius Sandvei (15 January 1905 – 1 November 1993) was a Norwegian linguist, educator and language politician. He is particularly known for his long-term editing of the Norwegian normative dictionary Tanums store rettskrivningsordbok.

== Biography ==
Sandvei was born on 15 January 1905, in Trondheim as the son of police officer Ole Sandvei and Johanne Sæther. He finished his secondary education in Trondheim in 1924, and graduated from the Royal Frederick University in 1930, his main subject being the Norwegian language. In 1930, he also married Antonette Kristine Nielsen. He lectured in Norwegian language and literature in Berlin (1930-193–) and Stockholm (1931–1935). From 1935, he taught at the Trondheim Cathedral School. From 1946 he was head teacher of secondary schools, first in Kristiansund, and from 1955 to 1975 at Grefsen.

Sandvei took an active role in the debates surrounding the formation and maintenance of the Norwegian language. He issued the Norwegian grammar Norwegische Konversations-Grammatik in German in 1934, and the dictionary Svensk-norsk ordbok in 1936. He is particularly well known for his role as editor of the normative dictionary Norsk rettskrivningsordbok, which had been initiated by philologist Jakob Sverdrup. When Sverdrup died in 1938, Sandvei took over as editor, and the dictionary was published in 1940. Later editions of the dictionary were called Tanums store rettskrivningsordbok, and often referred to as "Tanum" or "Sverdrup-Sandvei". Sandvei was a member of the Norwegian Language Council (Norwegian: Norsk Språknemnd) from its foundation from 1952 to 1959. He participated in the development of a revised textbook norm in 1959.

Sandvei was a member of Kristiansund city council, and was a parliamentary ballot candidate from the Oslo constituency in 1957 and 1961. In Kristiansund he also chaired the local branches of Rotary and Foreningen Norden. He was a central board member of the Norwegian Association of Graduate Teachers.

Sandvei died on 1 November 1993 in Oslo. After Sandvei's death, Boye Wangensteen took over as main editor for the 8th edition of Tanum, published in 1996, and also the 9th edition from 2005.
