= Helene Uri =

Norwegian linguist, novelist and children's writer

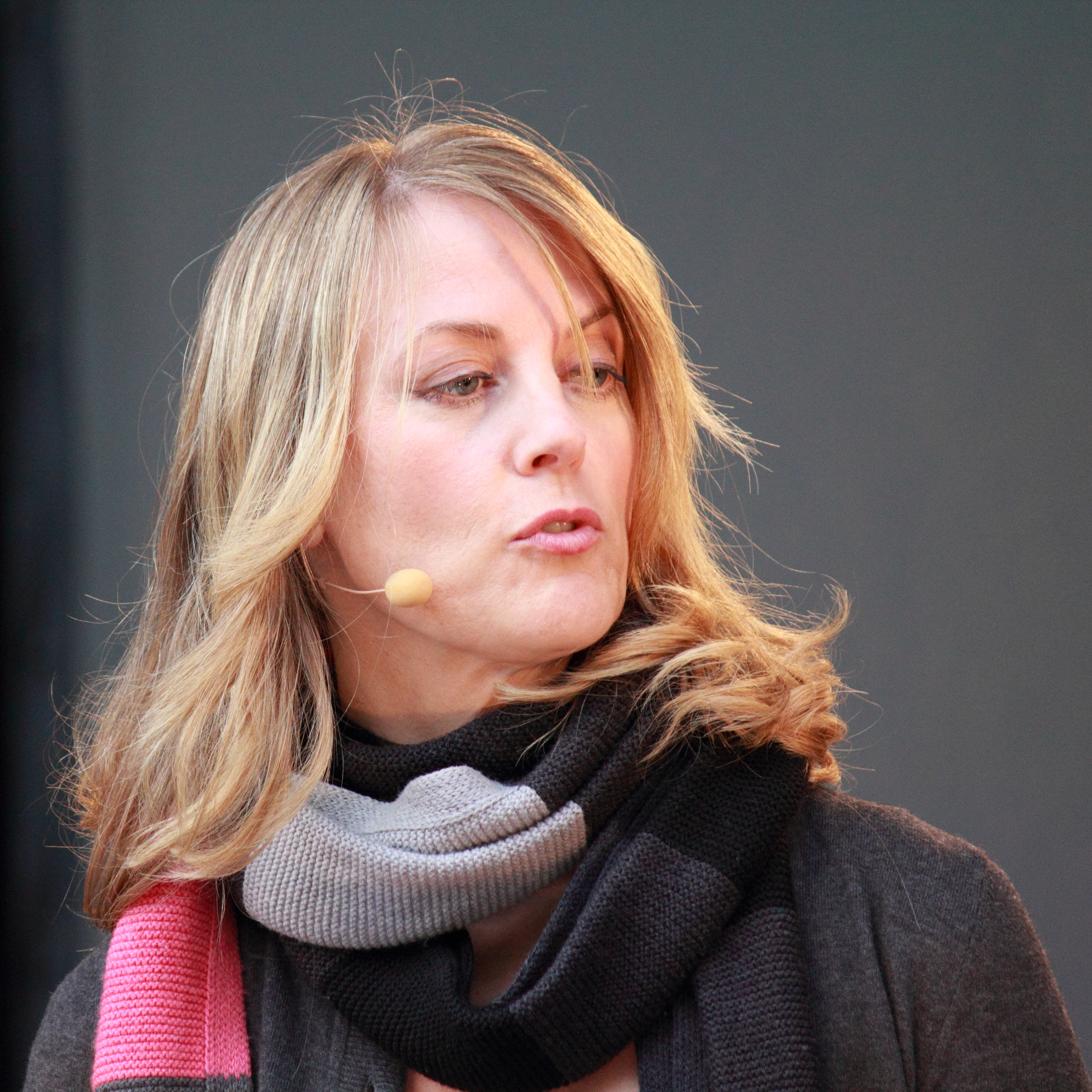
- Born: 11 December 1964 (age 61); Stockholm, Sweden
- Occupations: Linguist, novelist and children's writer

Helene Uri (born 11 December 1964, in Stockholm, Sweden) is a Norwegian linguist, novelist and children's writer. Among her novels are Dyp rød 315 from 2001 and Honningtunger from 2002. Her novel De beste blant oss from 2006, which deals with power struggles, intrigues and slander in academic circles, was well received by the critics.

She is a member of the Norwegian Academy for Language and Literature, board member of the Norwegian Language Council, and jury member of the Nordic Council's Literature Prize.

While writing her newest novel Rydde ut, which is set in Finnmark county, it was revealed to Uri that her family is partial Sámi, a fact that had been hidden due to the Norwegianization policy.
