= Store norske leksikon =

Norwegian-language online encyclopedia

Store norske leksikon (Great Norwegian Encyclopedia)
- Country: Norway
- Language: Norwegian
- Discipline: non-fiction, encyclopedia
- Publisher: Foreningen Store norske leksikon (Great Norwegian Encyclopedia Association)
- Published: 1906–present
- Website: snl.no

The Store Norske Leksikon (English: Great Norwegian Encyclopedia, abbreviated SNL) is a Norwegian-language online encyclopedia. It has several subdivisions, including the Norsk biografisk leksikon.

The online encyclopedia is among the most-read Norwegian published sites, with up to 3.5 million unique visitors per month.

== Paper editions (1978–2007) ==
The SNL was created in 1978, when the two publishing houses Aschehoug and Gyldendal merged their encyclopedias and created the company Kunnskapsforlaget.

Up until 1978 the two publishing houses of Aschehoug and Gyldendal, Norway's two largest, had published Aschehougs konversasjonsleksikon and Gyldendals konversasjonsleksikon, respectively. The respective first editions were published in 1906–1913 (Aschehoug) and 1933–1934 (Gyldendal).

The slump in sales of paper-based encyclopedias around the turn of the 21st century hit Kunnskapsforlaget hard, but a fourth edition of the paper encyclopedia was secured by a grant of ten million Norwegian kroner from the foundation Fritt Ord in 2003. The fourth edition consisted of 16 volumes, a total of 12,000 pages and 280,000 entries.

=== List of paper editions ===
- First edition, 1978–1981, 12 volumes. Chief editors Olaf Kortner, Preben Munthe, Egil Tveterås
- Second edition, 1986–1989, 15 volumes. Chief editors Olaf Kortner, Preben Munthe, Egil Tveterås.
- Third edition, 1995–1998, 16 volumes. Chief editor Petter Henriksen.
- Fourth edition, 2005–2007, 16 volumes. Chief editor Petter Henriksen.

== Online encyclopedia ==
The online edition of SNL was launched in 2000, and had both private and institutional subscribers. The paywall was removed on 25 February 2009, and the online encyclopedia became free to use.

On 12 March 2010, Kunnskapsforlaget announced that they would close the online encyclopedia because of lacklustre sales and failing revenue. It was also announced that the articles would not be given to the Wikimedia Foundation, with chief editor Petter Henriksen stating that: "It is important that the people behind the articles remain visible".

In 2011, the foundations Fritt Ord and Sparebankstiftelsen DNB acquired the encyclopedia, hired Anne Marit Godal as the new chief editor and established a new organisation, assisted by the Norwegian Academy of Science and Letters and Norwegian Non-Fiction Writers and Translators Association. In 2014 Foreningen Store norske leksikon ('the Great Norwegian Encyclopedia Association') was established; members of the association are Norwegian universities and other non-profit organisations. In 2016 Erik Bolstad became the chief editor.

As of 2023, the SNL has around 200,000 articles online, updated by approximately 1,200 affiliated academics. The SNL accepts contributions from users, but all changes to the articles are verified by a topic expert before publication.

Two years earlier than 2026, the encyclopedia disallowed use of artificial intelligence, in regard to [creating text for] its articles.
