= Geir Mork =

Norwegian publisher

- Born: 29 August 1955 (age 70); Ålesund
- Occupations: Literary scholar, businessperson and publisher

Geir Mork (born 29 August 1955) is a Norwegian literary researcher, businessperson and publisher. He was born in Ålesund. He was CEO of the publishing house Gyldendal Norsk Forlag from 1995 to 2015. He resides at Jar.
