= National Library of Norway =

Library in Oslo and Mo i Rana

The National Library of Norway
- Nasjonalbiblioteket
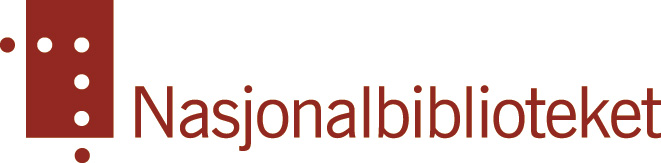

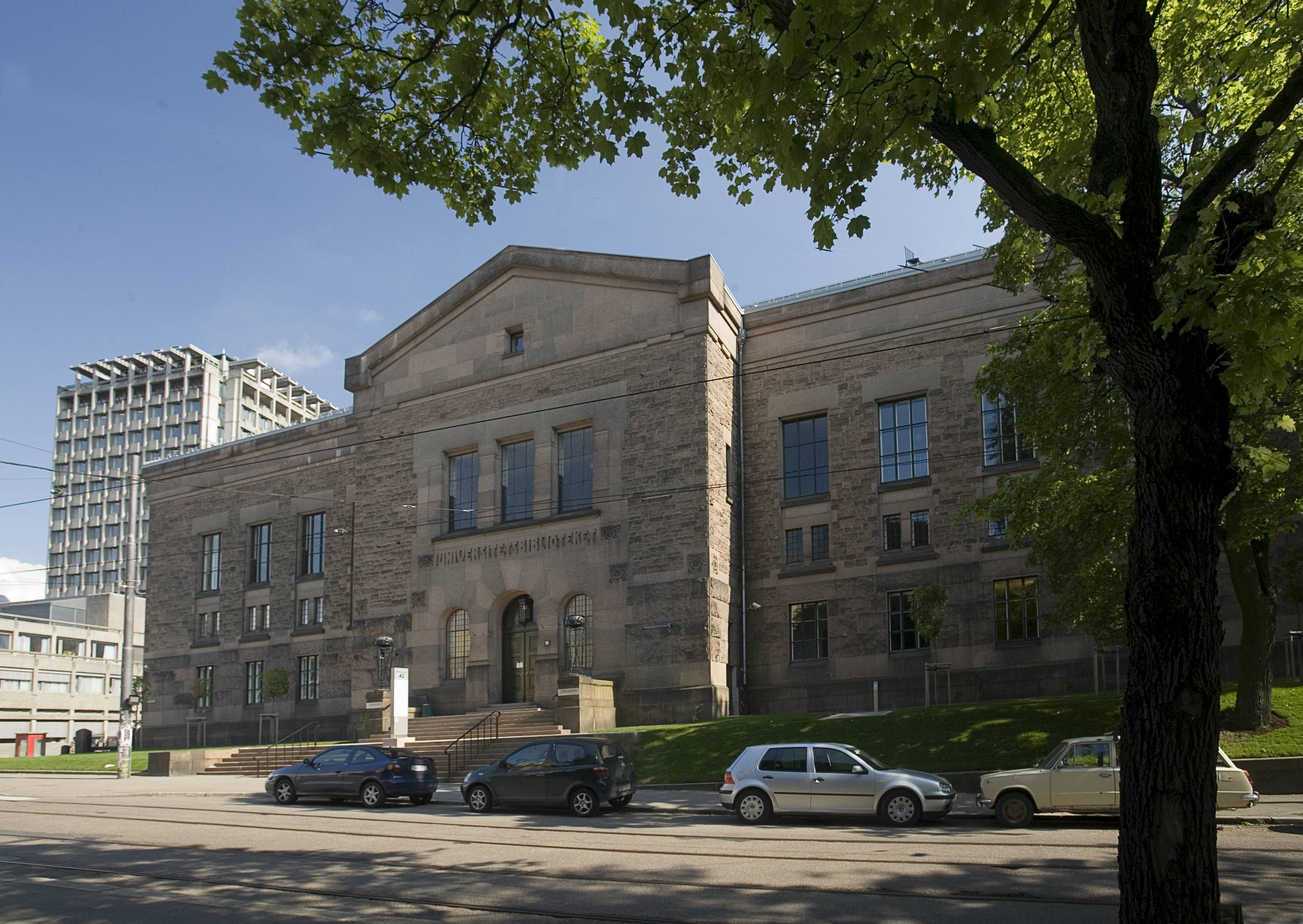
- The building of Nasjonalbiblioteket in Oslo
- 59°54′50.61″N 10°43′2.85″E
- Location: Oslo and Mo i Rana, Norway
- Established: 1989 (37 years ago)
- Reference to legal mandate: The Legal Deposit of generally available documents

Collection
- Items collected: Unique collections of manuscripts, special collections of books, music, radio and TV programmes, film, theatre, maps, posters, pictures, photographs, electronic documents and newspapers.
- Size: 8,5 million items
- Legal deposit: The Legal Deposit Act

Access and use
- Access requirements: Reading rooms: free. Registration for lending: be Norwegian resident or citizen over 18
- Circulation: 153,228 (2007)

Other information
- Director: Aslak Sira Myhre
- Employees: 420
- Website: www.nb.no

The National Library of Norway (Norwegian: Nasjonalbiblioteket) was established in 1989. Its principal task is "to preserve the past for the future". The library is located both in Oslo and in Mo i Rana. The building in Oslo was restored and reopened in 2005.

Prior to the existence of the National Library, the University Library of Oslo was assigned the tasks that normally fall to a national library.

The Norwegian ISBN Agency, responsible for assigning ISBNs with prefix 82- and 978-82-, is part of the National Library of Norway. The National Library is also responsible for legal deposits made from publishers in Norway. All material is to be submitted free of charge.

Aslak Sira Myhre is national librarian from November 2014.

== History ==
On 15 August 2005, Norway opened a fully functioning national library for the first time in its history. This occurred exactly 100 years after Norway dissolved its union with Sweden. Although gaining independence in 1905 marked the peak of Norwegian nationalism, it took Norway a century to go from being a sovereign nation-state to establishing its own national library. The establishment of the national library evolved as a result of a lengthy political process. Since 1813, the University of Oslo Library had functioned as both a library for the university and a national library. In 1989, Norway established a repository in Rana in the northern part of the country as part of the national library, with a mandate to preserve everything published within the country in compliance with a revised version of the Legal Deposition Act. The University of Oslo Library retained its mandate to preserve historical and unique collections and to make all its collections available to the public. In 1999, these tasks were consolidated within a newly established branch of the national library in Oslo. Provisional arrangements were made for the period between 1999 and 2005, while the library building was being renovated. In 2005, the national library moved into a renovated building in Oslo, which marked the true beginning for this new national institution. With its reopening in 2005, the national library launched its redesigned website. The institution intended to present itself as a modern library, with both a physical presence and a digital appearance. According to the website, it was to be the premier source of information about Norway, Norwegians and Norwegian culture, and Norway’s main resource for the collection, archiving and distribution of Norwegian media.

== Digital Library project ==
The National Library of Norway started with digitization process in 2006 with a goal to digitize its entire collection. In October 2012 the Minister of Culture, Hadia Tajik, opened the website Bokhylla (Norwegian for 'The Bookshelf') as a permanent service. When launched, the service offered 104,000 books online out of estimated 250,000 total books published in Norway before the year 2000. The Digital Library of Norway is sometimes also called NBdigital.

Due to copyright restrictions, Bokhylla applies IP address blocking to some of the books which are available only for Norwegian IP addresses. For access outside Norwegian IP-space, users have to apply through special form.

In 2013, Bokhylla reported 51 million page views served during 2012, which indicates that, for its users, the National Library of Norway is essentially a digital library.

== See also ==
- List of libraries in Norway
- List of national and state libraries
