= Harald Grieg =

Norwegian publisher (1894–1972)

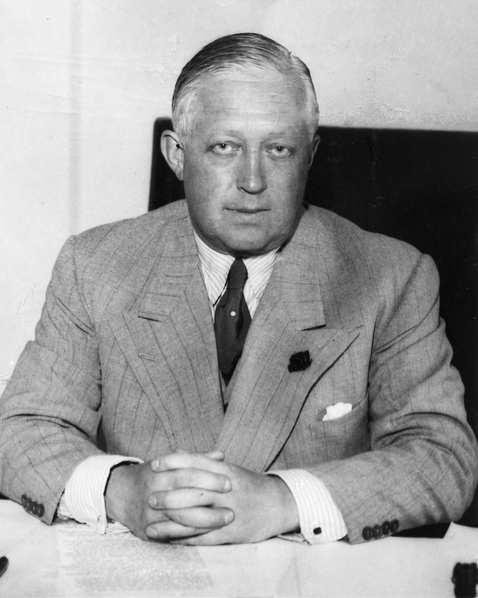
- Born: 3 August 1894; Bergen, Bergen Municipality
- Died: 6 October 1972 (aged 78); Oslo, Oslo Municipality
- Occupation: Publisher
- Spouse(s): Solveig Christov
- Parent(s): Helga Grieg

Harald Grieg (3 August 1894 – 6 October 1972) was a Norwegian publisher. He served as the director of Gyldendal Norsk Forlag and was a prominent figure in the Norwegian book industry for many years.

== Biography ==
Grieg was born on 3 August 1894 in Bergen, Norway, to Peter Lexau Grieg (1864–1924) and Helga Vollan (1869–1946). His brother, Nordahl Grieg, was a writer and an active member of the Norwegian Armed Forces in exile during the Second World War.

After passing his examen artium at the Bergen Cathedral School in 1912, he traveled to Kristiania (now Oslo) to continue his studies, earning a cand.philol. degree from the University of Kristiania in 1917. He then worked as the Kristiania correspondent for the Bergen-based newspaper Morgenavisen. In 1920, he received an offer to join the Norwegian department of Gyldendalske Boghandel Nordisk Forlag. When the independent Gyldendal Norsk Forlag was founded in 1925 with Grieg as CEO, the new publishing house owed a residual debt to its Danish counterpart, which was repaid within six years.

Following the German occupation of Norway in 1940, Nazi authorities used Gyldendal to publish propaganda material. Novelist Knut Hamsun, a friend of Grieg, was involved in this project. Grieg also served as chairman of the board for the Nationaltheatret. In June 1941, the board refused to sumbit to the Ministry of Culture and Enlightenment. In response, authorities arrested Grieg, board member Francis Bull, and theatre director Johannes Sejersted Bødtker on 26 June 1941. Grieg was incarcerated at the Grini concentration camp, but was later released. Knut Hamsun's son, Tore Hamsun, was appointed acting director of Gyldendal.

After the war's end in 1945, Grieg returned to his position as director until 1970. He served as chairman of the Norwegian Publishers' Association from 1936 to 1941 and again from 1945 to 1960. From 1948 until 1964, he was chairman of the Foundation for Swedish-Norwegian Cooperation (Fondet for svensk-norsk samarbeid).

== Awards ==
Grieg was the Commander of the Order of St. Olav (1962), Commander of the Swedish Order of the Polar Star, Commander of the Order of the White Rose of Finland and of the Danish Order of the Dannebrog. In 1958, he was awarded the Riksmål Society Literature Prize.

Cultural offices
Preceded by Jens Michael Lund	Chairman of Foreningen Norden in Norway; 1939-1950	Succeeded by Henning Bødtker
