= Harald L. Tveterås =

Norwegian librarian and author

Harald L. veterås
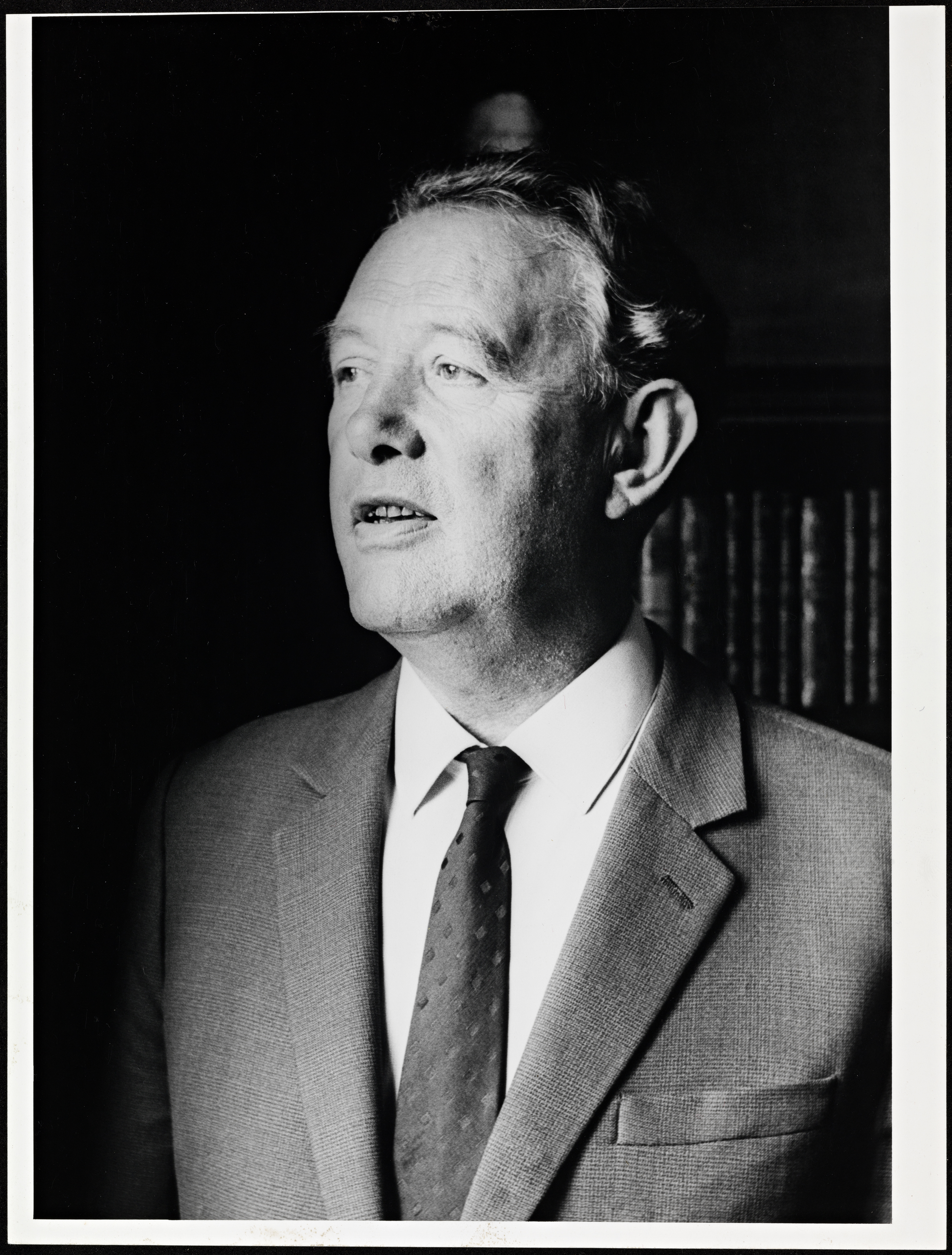
- Born: Harald Ludvig Tveterås; 15 October 1904
- Died: 15 June 1991 (aged 86)
- Occupations: Librarian; Author
- Children: Egil Tveterås
- Relatives: Rasmus Tveteraas (father); Vilhelm Tveteraas (brother)
- Writing career
- Language: Norwegian

Harald Ludvig Tveterås (15 October 1904 – 30 June 1991) was a Norwegian librarian and author.

== Biography ==
He was born in Stavanger to school inspector and politician Rasmus Tveteraas and Laurentze Mæle, and was a brother of printmaker Vilhelm Tveteraas. He was the father of Egil Tveterås. He graduated at the Stavanger Cathedral School in 1925. He became cand.philol. in 1932 and dr.philos. in 1966 at the University of Oslo.

He was assigned with the University of Oslo Library for forty years, from 1929. Between 1947-48, he was a librarian at the UNESCO library in Paris. He served as chairman of the Norwegian National Commission for UNESCO 1952-67 and continued to 1969 as deputy chairman. From 1969 to 1974 he served as National Librarian (riksbibliotekar). Among his works are the first three volumes of Den norske bokhandels historie (1950-1986). He was decorated Knight, First Class of the Order of St. Olav in 1967. In 1987 he received the founder of Fritt Ord Award (Fritt Ords Honnør).
