= Anne Marit Godal =

Norwegian encyclopedist

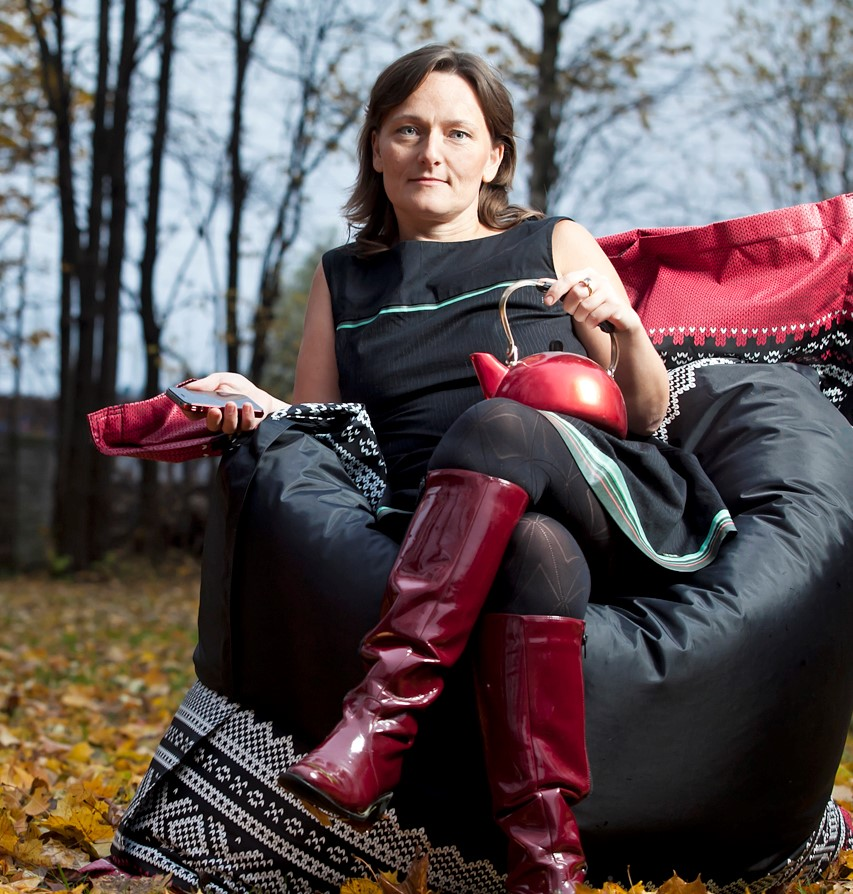
- Anne Godal in 2010
- Born: October 20, 1973 (age 52)
- Education: University of Oslo
- Occupation: encyclopedist
- Political party: Norwegian Labour Party

Anne Marit Godal (born 20 November 1972) is a Norwegian encyclopedist.

== Education ==
Godal studied political science at the University of Oslo.

== Career ==
Godal has held positions in the Norwegian Labour Party and No to the EU.

From 2011 to 2016, she was editor-in-chief of Store norske leksikon [the Great Norwegian encyclopedia], Store medisinske leksikon (an associated medical encyclopedia), and Norsk biografisk leksikon (a biographical encyclopedia).

When she took over the editorship, these works were in danger of running out of funding. Godal secured university funding for their long-term survival.

From 2017 to 2021, she developed the activities of Inspiria Science Center. In 2018, she published an anthology of poems: Things have to change, soon, it´s coming - 100 Norwegian poems of community and fight (Alt skal bli forandra snart. 100 norske dikt om fellesskap og kamp), together with co editor Leif Høghaug.
