= Janss (surname) =

Janss is a surname. Notable people with the surname include:

- Edmee Janss (born 1965), Dutch cricketer
- Emily Janss (born 1978), American soccer player
- Christian Janss (born 1966), Norwegian philologist

== See also ==
- Janss (disambiguation)
