= Harald Noreng =

Norwegian literary researcher and lexicographer (1913–2006)

Harald Noreng (25 April 1913 – 7 February 2006) was a Norwegian literary researcher and lexicographer.

== Personal life ==
He was born on the island of Hisøy in 1913. He was the son of boat builder Johan Wilhelm Hanssen (1887–1967) and Kathrine Marie Pettersen (1888–1971). He changed his last name from Hanssen to Noreng in 1933. In February 1941 he married jurist Alice Schwabe-Hansen (1915–2004). They had two children, Øystein Noreng (1942–) and Astrid Noreng Sjølie (1946–2023).

== Career ==
He finished his secondary education in 1932, and enrolled in philology at the University of Oslo. He took the cand.philol. degree in 1940 with the thesis Nils Kjær og nyromantikken. He worked as a teacher, mainly at Oslo Cathedral School, until 1958, except for several years as a researcher. He held research fellowship both at the University of Oslo, Lund University and at NAVF. He took the dr.philos. degree in 1949 with the thesis Nils Kjær. Fra radikal til reaksjonær. The opponents at his thesis defence were Francis Bull, A. H. Winsnes and Gunnar Høst. In 1958 he was hired as a lecturer at the University of Oslo. From 1960 to 1980 he was a professor of European literature at the University of Bergen. Among his later works the publication the complete works of Christian Braunmann Tullin between 1972 and 1976. He was inducted into the Norwegian Academy of Science and Letters in 1973.

After retiring as a professor he led the long-time project to register and list every word used throughout the authorship of Henrik Ibsen in an electronic database. The project spanned from 1978 to 1986, and resulted in the 1987 release Henrik Ibsens ordskatt. Vokabular over hans diktning, edited by Noreng, Knut Hofland and Kristin Natvig. Noreng also worked with volumes one through four of the dictionary Norsk Riksmålsordbok between 1938 and 1957, and in 1995 he wrote two extra volumes. For this he received the Fritt Ord Honorary Award in 1995. He died in February 2006 in Oslo.
