= Vigdis Ystad =

Norwegian literary historian (1942–2019)

- Born: 13 January 1942; Verdal Municipality, Norway
- Died: 7 December 2019 (aged 77); Oslo
- Occupation: Literary historian
- Employer: University of Oslo
- Spouse: Daniel Haakonsen

Vigdis Ystad (13 January 1942 – 7 December 2019) was a Norwegian literary historian.

== Biography ==
She was born in Verdal Municipality, Norway. In 1974 she became dr.philos. at the University of Oslo. She was a university lecturer at the University of Oslo 1973–74, lecturer 1975–79 and professor from 1979. She was a member of the Norwegian Academy of Science and Letters, the Royal Society of Sciences in Uppsala, the Royal Academy of Science and Antiquities, the Norwegian Academy and the Norwegian Language and Literature Society. In 2012, Vigdis Ystad was appointed a knight of the 1st class of the Order of St. Olav.

She was married to fellow literary historian Daniel Haakonsen (1917–1989). She died in December 2019.
