= Jacob S. Worm-Müller =

Norwegian politician and historian

Jacob Stenersen Worm-Müller
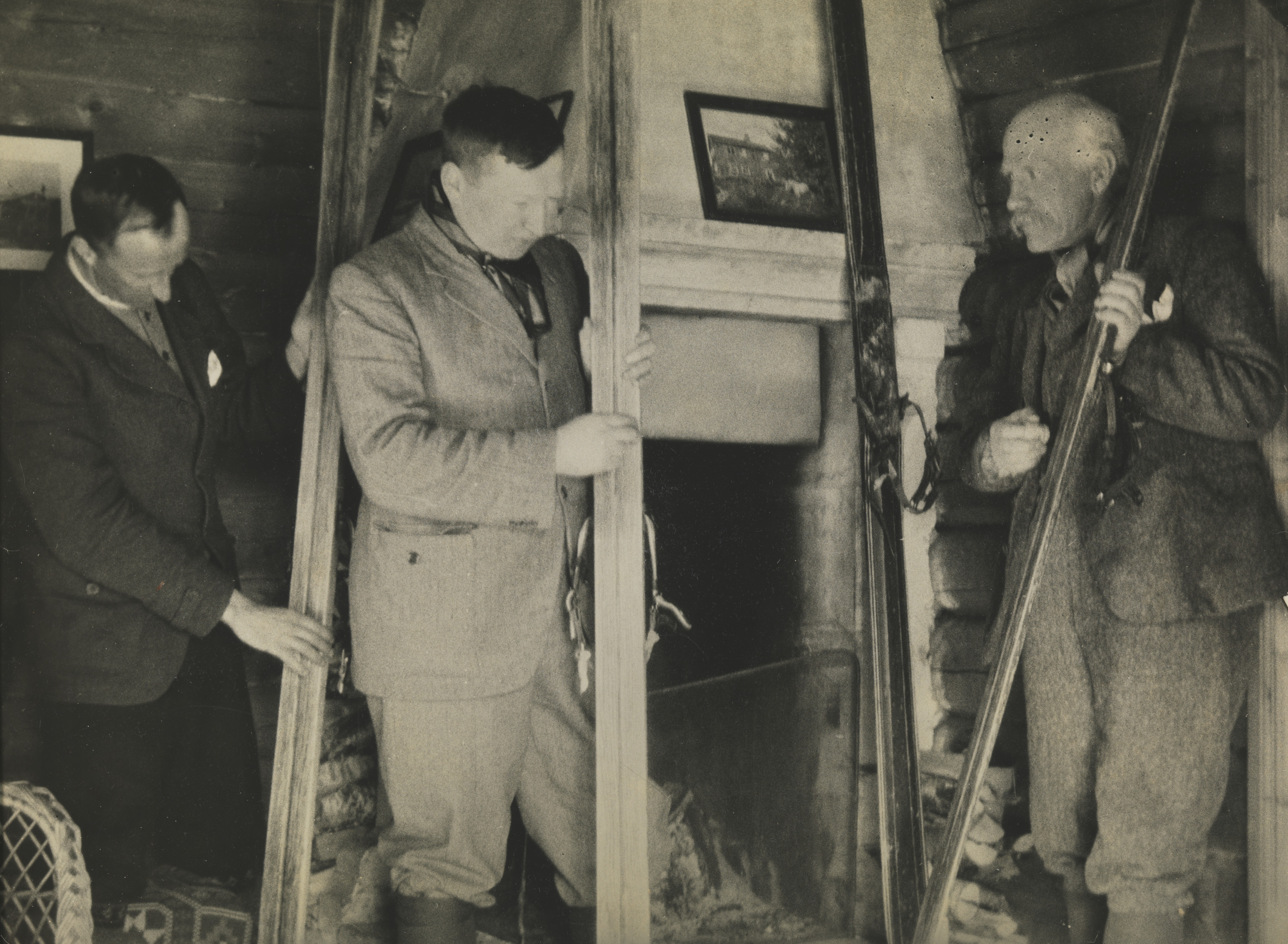
- Jacob S. Worm-Müller (middle), with Wilhelm von Munthe af Morgenstierne (left) and Fridtjof Nansen (right)
- Born: 25 December 1884; Kristiania, Norway
- Died: 12 November 1963 (aged 78)
- Occupations: Historian, magazine editor, university professor and politician
- Known for: Delegate to the League of Nations (1926 and 1927); Delegate to the United Nations (1945, 1946–1951); Leader of the Liberal Party of Norway (1945–1952)
- Notable work: Editor-in-chief of Samtiden (1925–1940; 1945–1963)
- Awards: Commander of the Order of St. Olav (1951)

Jacob Stenersen Worm-Müller (25 December 1884 – 12 November 1963) was a Norwegian historian, magazine editor, and professor at the University of Oslo. He was a politician, a delegate to the League of Nations and the United Nations.

== Early and personal life ==
Worm-Müller was born in Kristiania as the son of physician and physiology professor Jacob Worm-Müller (1834–1889) and Aurora Olivia Eleonore Louise Olsen. He was married to Johanne Caroline Elisabeth Lippestad—daughter of Johan Anton Lippestad and sister of Fascist politician Johan Lippestad—from 1910 to 1927, and to Asta Josefina Blidberg from 1939.

The events in 1905 made a permanent impression on him, and had a deep influence on his later career.

== Career ==
Worm-Müller became dr.philos. in 1919 with the thesis Norge gjennom nødsaarene, a documentation on the period from 1807 to 1810. He referred to this period as the "distress years" since Norway suffered from the Gunboat War and the Continental System. He started lecturing at the University of Kristiania in 1919, and was a professor from 1928. His research work Christiania og krisen efter Napoleonskrigene from 1922 is regarded a central contribution to economic history. He was editor-in-chief for the magazine Samtiden from 1925 to 1940, and again from 1945 to 1963. He was delegate to the League of Nations in 1926 and 1927. He participated in politics during the 1930s, by running for election to the Norwegian Parliament for the Liberal Party, but was not elected.

As an adviser to the Norwegian Nobel Committee, he wrote a report critical of Mahatma Gandhi's nomination for the Nobel Peace Prize.

After the German invasion and subsequent occupation of Norway in April 1940 he had a significant influence on negotiations in Parliament in September the same year. His University lectures on the historical events back in 1905 were of such a character that the Nazi authorities demanded their cancellation. Worm-Müller left the country to join the exile government in London, where he edited the magazine The Norseman from 1942 to 1945.

Worm-Müller was a delegate from Norway to the San Francisco Conference that resulted in the founding of the United Nations in 1945. He was a Norwegian delegate to the United Nations from 1946 to 1951. He was chairman for the Liberal Party of Norway from 1945 to 1952.

Worm-Müller became Commander of the Royal Norwegian Order of St. Olav in 1951. In 1954 he was honored with the festschrift Ideer og mennesker.

Party political offices
Preceded by Johan Ludwig Mowinckel	Leader of the Liberal Party of Norway; 1945-1952	Succeeded by Bent Røiseland
