= Andreas Hofgaard Winsnes =

Norwegian historian (1889–1972)

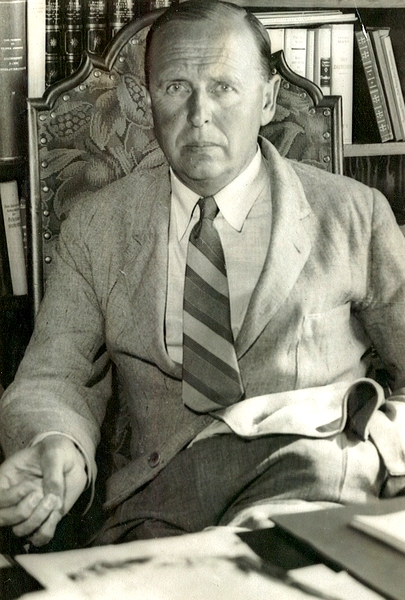
- Born: 25 October 1889; Nordre Odalen, Norway
- Died: 9 July 1972 (aged 82); Oslo, Norway
- Occupations: Literary Historian and Educator

Andreas Hofgaard Winsnes (25 October 1889 – 9 July 1972) was a Norwegian literary historian and educator.

== Biography ==
Winsnes was born in Nordre Odalen Municipality, Norway. He was the son of Frederik Vilhelm Vinsnes (1837-1920) and Agnete Helweg (1850-1918). He completed his examen artium in 1908 at Oslo Cathedral School. He became Cand.philol. from the Royal Danish Academy of Fine Arts in 1913 and Dr.philos. in 1920.

In 1937, Winsnes became a lecturer in German literature and was appointed professor at the University of Oslo in the same year. During World War II, he became director of the Norwegian-British Institute in London from 1942 to 1945. After the war, he was the editor of Samtiden from 1945 to 1946. In 1953, he was among the founders of the Norwegian Academy (Det Norske Akademi for Språk og Litteratur). He held the position of professor of philosophical language analysis at the University of Oslo until he took leave in 1959.

Winsnes is most associated with the literary history Norsk litteraturhistorie. I - VI. Consisting of four volumes which were published between 1924 and 1937, this was a collaborative work with Francis Bull, Fredrik Paasche and Philip Houm. Among his other works are his thesis about Johan Nordahl Brun from 1919 and biographies of Sigrid Undset and Hans E. Kinck.

== Selected works ==
- Den norske roman i 1870–80-aarene (1920)
- Det norske selskab: 1772–1812 (1924)
- Niels Treschow: en opdrager til menneskelighet (1927)
- Skillelinjer: fem artikler om samtidig tenkning (1929)
- Den annen front: engelske idealister (1932)
- Sigrid Undset: en studie i kristen realism (1949)
- Diktning og livssyn (1949)
