= Gyldendal Norsk Forlag =

Norwegian publishing company

Gyldendal Norsk Forlag AS
- Traded as: Oslo Stock Exchange: GYL
- Founded: 1925; 101 years ago
- Country of origin: Norway
- Headquarters location: Oslo
- Key people: Arne Magnus
- Publication types: Books, magazines
- Official website: www.gyldendal.no

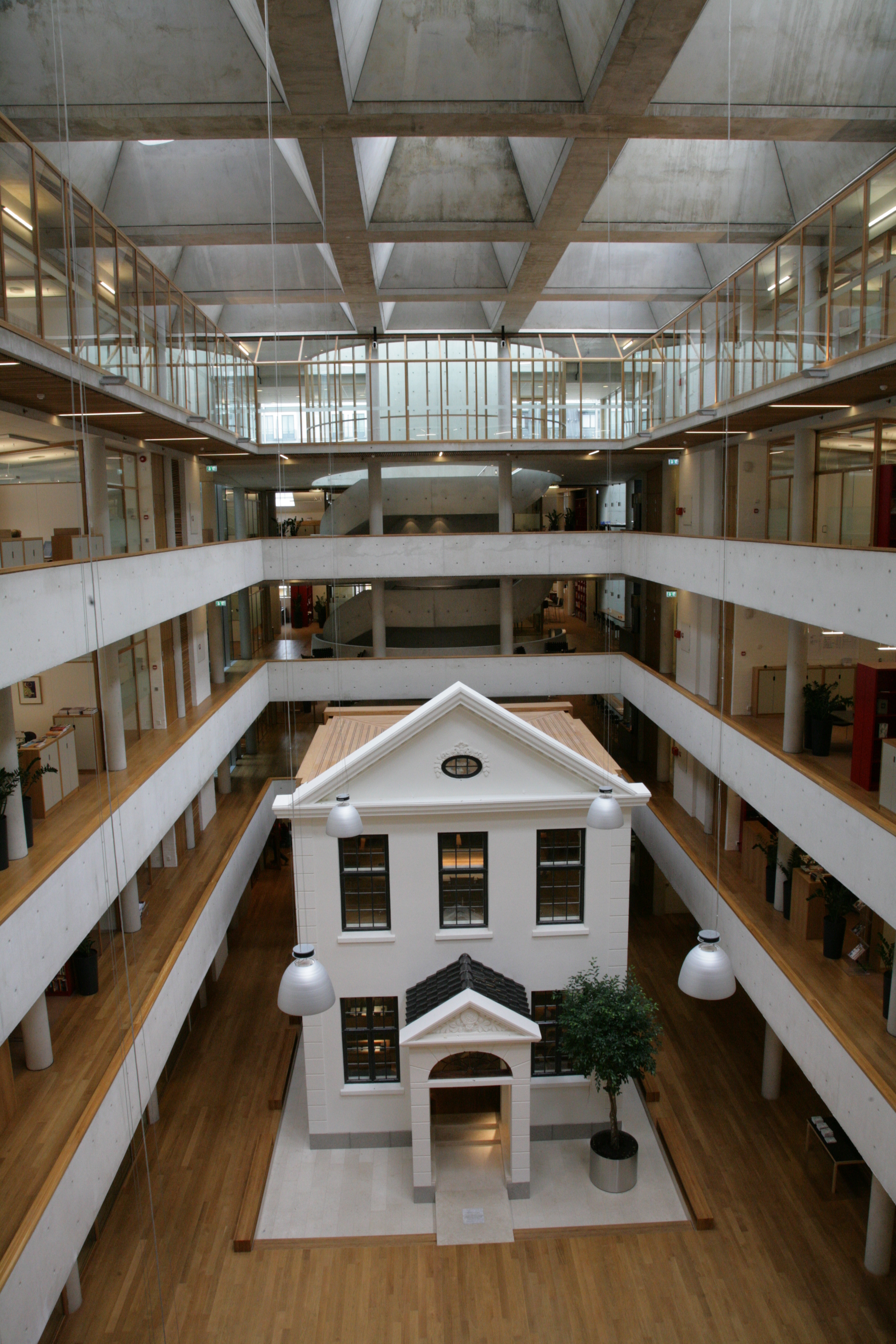
The central hall in the Gyldendal house in Oslo. The house within the central atrium is called Danskehuset (the Danish House), after the house of the original Danish publishing house Gyldendal. Architect was Sverre Fehn.

Gyldendal Norsk Forlag AS, commonly referred to as Gyldendal N.F. and in Norway often only as Gyldendal, is one of the largest Norwegian publishing houses. It was founded in 1925 after buying the rights to publications from the Danish publishing house Gyldendal, which the company also takes its name from.

== Gyldendal Norsk Forlag AS ==
Gyldendal Norsk Forlag AS was founded in 1925. It was established when a group of Norwegian investors "bought home" the works of "The Four Greats" and Knut Hamsun, which had previously been published by the Danish publishing house Gyldendal. Harald Grieg played a central role in this operation and became the new company's director. Hamsun, who was awarded the Nobel Prize in Literature in 1920, provided significant capital and became its largest shareholder.

The company publishes fiction, non-fiction, school books, and children's books. Gyldendal owns 50% of Kunnskapsforlaget, along with Aschehoug, which publishes encyclopedias, dictionaries, and other reference books, including the Store norske leksikon. Gyldendal also publishes the literary magazine Vinduet. The company is organised as a division of Gyldendal ASA, a holding company listed on the Oslo Stock Exchange.

Gyldendal Norsk Forlag AS consists of the following four divisions: Gyldendal Litteratur, Gyldendal Undervisning, Gyldendal Akademisk, and Gyldendal Rettsdata.

== Gyldendal ASA ==
Gyldendal ASA (OSE: GYL) is a Norwegian holding company active in the publishing sector. The company is operational through Gyldendal Norsk Forlag AS, a wholly owned publishing house plus four other principal subsidiaries: Ark Bokhandel AS, a wholly owned book store; Kunnskapsforlaget ANS, a book company that specializes in dictionaries and encyclopedias; Forlagssentralen ANS, 50%-owned company which manages the company's logistics and transport operations, and De norske Bokklubbene AS, a 48.5%-owned book club.

== Executive officers ==
Since 1925, Gyldendal has been led by these people:

- 1925–1941: Harald Grieg
- 1942–1944: Tore Hamsun
- 1945–1970: Harald Grieg
- 1970–1980: Ingebrikt Jensen
- 1980–1990: Andreas Skartveit
- 1990–1995: Nils Kåre Jacobsen
- 1995–2015: Geir Mork
- 2016–present: John Tørres Thuv
