= Christian Janss =

Norwegian philologist

Christian Janss (born 5 May 1966) is a Norwegian philologist.

Hailing from Kråkerøy, he gained attention when graduating from Frydenberg Upper Secondary School in 1985 with stellar grades. His hobbies at the time included piano and photography. After attending folk high school in the Faroe Islands, Janss attended the Russian training course in the Norwegian Armed Forces and studied Russian and German at the university. He took the cand.philol. degree in 1994 with a master's thesis on Rainer Maria Rilke, and the dr.philos. degree in 2001 with the thesis "Der Rhein" – Hölderlins Metapher.

In the first half of the 2000s, he was employed as an "editorial philologist" in the team that collected the complete works of Henrik Ibsen, ahead of the 100th anniversary for Ibsen's death in 2006. In 2003 he also published the book Lyrikkens liv together with Christian Refsum, an introductory book in the reading of poetry.

Janss is a professor of German literature at the University of Oslo. He is a fellow of the Norwegian Academy since 2001. He resides in Bærum.
