= Trond Berg Eriksen =

Norwegian historian (born 1945)

Trond Berg Eriksen (born 3 October 1945) is a Norwegian historian of ideas, non-fiction writer and magazine editor. He was born in Øvre Eiker in Buskerud. His thesis, from 1975, was on the ethics of Aristoteles. He was appointed professor at the University of Oslo from 1990. He edited the magazine Samtiden from 1989 to 1993, and has published a number of books.
