= Norwegian Non-Fiction Writers and Translators Association =

Organization for writers and translators

The Norwegian Non-Fiction Writers and Translators Association (NFF) (Norwegian: Norsk faglitterær forfatter- og oversetterforening) is an organization for writers and translators of all kinds of non-fiction literature. Membership is open to writers and translators who have published at least 100 pages of non-fiction, and the association has approximately 5300 members.

The Norwegian Non-fiction Writers Association was founded in 1978. In 1990, it merged with The Norwegian Non-fiction Translators Association to form The Norwegian Non-fiction Writers And Translators Association (NFF).

NFF secures and protects the professional and economic interests of authors and translators by negotiating contracts and agreements with public and private institutions. NFF also strives to promote high quality non-fiction literature and to strengthen the Norwegian language. The association offers courses and seminars to members and non-members alike.

- Secretary general: Cathrine Sandnes (from January 2026).

== The Non-fiction Literary Fund ==
NFF has collected remuneration for public lending right (PLR) since 1979 and remuneration for the reproduction of non-fiction works since 1980. The revenue from these remuneration schemes is deposited in the Non-fiction Literary Fund. The purpose of the fund is to support the production of Norwegian non-fiction, primarily through grant schemes for non-fiction authors and translators.

The grants from the Non-fiction Literary Fund amount to approximately US$7.5 million per year. $4.5 million is paid in the form of project grants to authors and translators working on a book project. The remainder is paid as travel grants and as honorary grants to authors and translators of at least 67 years of age.
