= Ragnvald Alfred Roscher Lund =

Norwegian military officer (1899–1975)

Ragnvald Alfred Roscher Lund (24 February 1899 – 23 October 1975) was a Norwegian military officer, with the rank of colonel.

== Career ==
Lund was a military attaché at the Norwegian legation in Stockholm in 1940. He served as head of the Office FO II at the Norwegian High Command in exile in London during World War II, responsible for Military Intelligence.

After the Second World War Roscher Lund served as an advisor to the first United Nations Secretary General, Trygve Lie.

== Personal life ==
Lund was born in Kristiania (now Oslo) on 24 February 1899. He was the father of novelist and playwright Vera Henriksen.

He died on 23 October 1975.
