= Knut Olav Åmås =

Norwegian writer, editor and politician

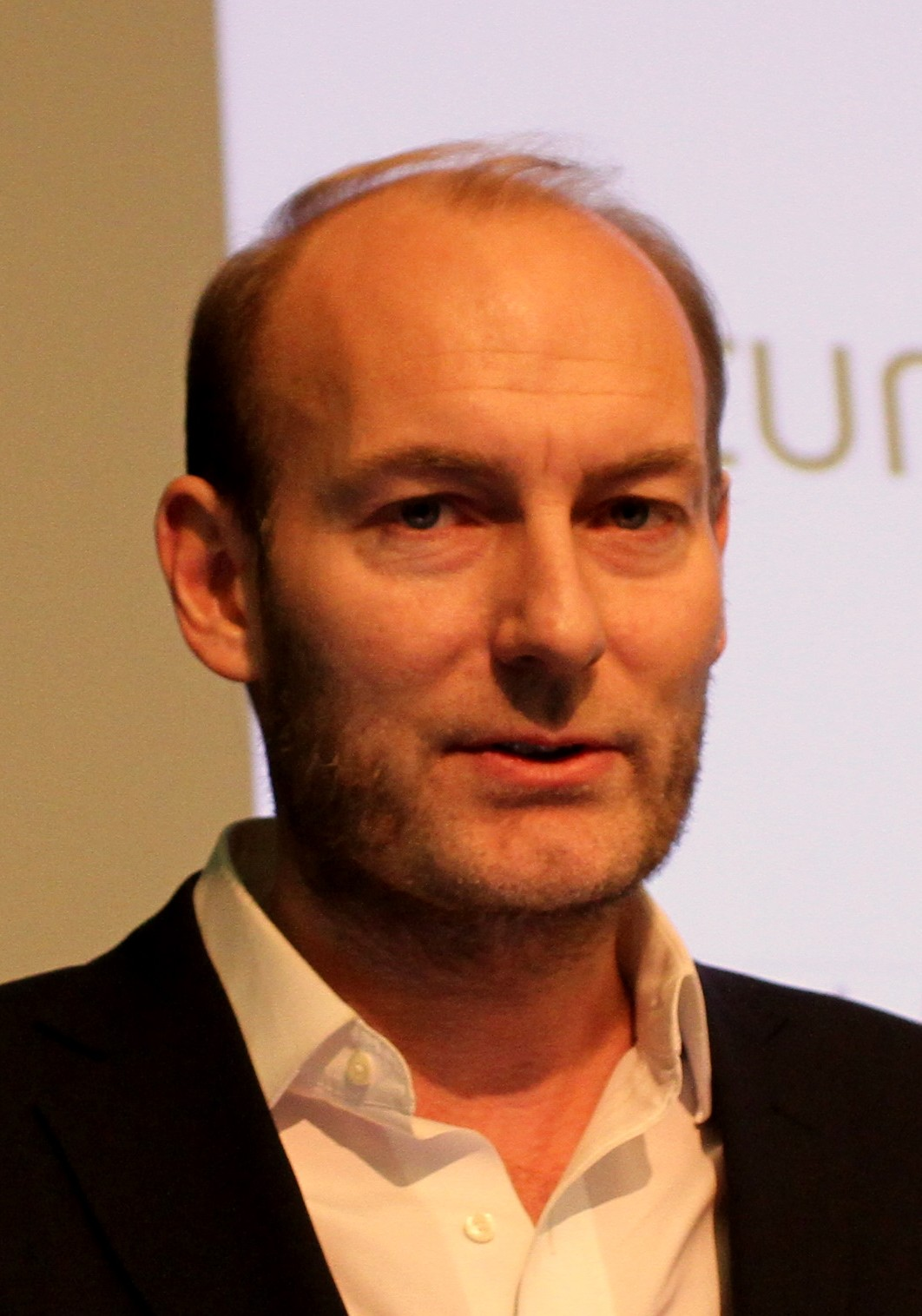
- Born: 19 January 1968 (age 58)
- Education: dr.philos.
- Occupations: writer and editor
- Writing career
- Notable work: Conservative Party

Knut Olav Åmås (born 19 January 1968) is a Norwegian writer, editor and politician for the Conservative Party.

He hails from Odda Municipality. He holds a cand.philol. degree in philosophy, having taken his master's thesis on Ludwig Wittgenstein at the University of Bergen. He later took a dr.philos. degree on a biographical thesis about Olav H. Hauge. He has worked as a journalist in Bergens Tidende, and is from 2006 debate editor (from 2008: editor of culture and debate) in Aftenposten. He was an editor in the publishing house Universitetsforlaget from 1996 to 2001, and edited the periodical Samtiden from 2001 to 2006. In 2013, he was named in Solberg's Cabinet as State Secretary in the Ministry of Culture and Church Affairs. He is currently the Director of Fritt Ord.

Åmås is gay.
