= Daniel Haakonsen =

Norwegian literary historian

- Born: 15 May 1917; Bergen
- Died: 27 May 1989 (aged 72)
- Occupation: Literary historian
- Employer: University of Oslo
- Spouse: Vigdis Ystad

Daniel Haakonsen (15 May 1917 – 27 May 1989) was a Norwegian literary historian. He was born in Bergen, and was married to Vigdis Ystad. He was appointed professor at the University of Oslo from 1966 to 1984. His main literary research was on Henrik Ibsen. He published analysis of several of Ibsen's plays, and the biography Henrik Ibsen – mennesket og kunstneren from 1981.
