= Helge Rønning =

Norwegian literary researcher (born 1943)

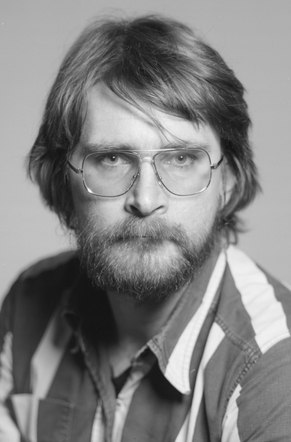
- Helge Rønning, 1978
- Born: 1 September 1943 (age 82); Oslo, Norway
- Occupation: literary scholar

Helge Rønning (born 1 September 1943) is a Norwegian literary researcher. He was born in Oslo. He was editor of the magazine Samtiden from 1979 to 1988, and was appointed professor at the University of Oslo from 1987. Among his research interests is African literature, Henrik Ibsen and the role of television.
