= Vera Henriksen =

Norwegian novelist, playwright, and non-fiction writer

- Born: Vera Margrethe Roscher Lund; 22 March 1927; Oslo, Norway
- Died: 23 May 2016 (aged 89)
- Occupations: Novelist, playwright, writer

Vera Margrethe Henriksen (née Roscher Lund; 22 March 1927 – 23 May 2016) was a Norwegian novelist, playwright, and non-fiction writer. She was particularly known for her historical novels and plays set in the Middle Ages.

== Biography ==
Vera Margrethe Roscher Lund was born in Oslo and lived there until 1940, when she moved to Arendal. Her father was military officer, later Colonel Ragnvald Alfred Roscher Lund (1899–1975), the first commander of the Norwegian Military Intelligence Service, head of the Norwegian High Command's office FO II in exile in London during World War II. In 1944, she had to flee Norway during the Occupation of Norway by Nazi Germany.

She continued her secondary education at the Norwegian gymnasium in Uppsala, Sweden, and graduated in 1945. The following year she traveled to the United States where her family lived in New Jersey. She studied architecture at Yale University from 1946 to 1948. From 1948 to 1949, she studied art history and journalism at Columbia University. She married shipping executive, Olav Gotfred Henriksen (21.01.1924–05.07.2013) in 1948. In total, she lived in the United States from 1946 to 1963.

Her first novel, Sølvhammeren (The Silver Hammer) was published in 1961. This novel was followed by Jærtegn (Miracle) in 1962, and Helgenkongen (The Saint King) in 1963. The trilogy is about Olaf II of Norway and his time. In the 1970s she wrote a novel series from the period after the Protestant Reformation, Trollsteinen from 1970, followed by Pilegrimsferd, Blåbreen, Staupet and Skjærsild, the last from 1977. Among her historical plays are Asbjørn Selsbane from 1972, and Sverdet, first staged in 1974. She has also written books for children and young adults.

Vera Henriksen has an unusually broad and extensive range of writings behind her. She has written or delivered contributions to nearly fifty books. Central is a series of historical novels, some in several volumes, but she has also written contemporary novels, plays and nonfiction. Inspired by her father she developed an early interest in history, especially Norse saga literature. Several of her books center on the problematic transition from Norse mythology to Christianity.

In addition to her fiction writing, Henriksen has written several non-fiction books. Among these are two volumes of the history of the Royal Norwegian Air Force, covering the period from 1912 until 1945.

She was decorated Knight, First Class of the Royal Norwegian Order of St. Olav in 1997. She was awarded the Norwegian Booksellers' Prize in 1962, and the Mads Wiel Nygaard's Endowment in 1978.

== Awards ==
- 1962 - Bokhandlerprisen
- 1973 - Sarpsborgprisen
- 1978 - Mads Wiel Nygaard's Endowment
- 1988 - Riksmålsforbundets barne- og ungdomsbokpris

== Bibliography ==
=== Novels ===
- Sølvhammeren 1961
- Jærtegn 1962
- Helgekongen 1963
- Glassberget 1966
- Trollsteinen 1970
- Pilgrimsferd 1971
- Blåbreen 1973
- Staupet 1975
- Skjærsild 1977
- Dronningsagaen 1979
- Kongespeil 1980
- Bodvars saga. Odins ravner 1983
- Bodvars saga. Spydet 1984
- Hellig Olav 1985
- Runekorset 1986
- Rekviem for et lite dampskip 1988
- Bodvars saga. Ravn og due 1989
- Silhuetter mot hvitt lys 1990
- Stavkjerringa 1997
- Klangen av en lutt 2001
- Ildens sang 2002
- Jarlefeiden 2003

=== Plays ===
- Asbjørn Selsbane 1972 (play)
- Sverdet 1974 (play)
- Riksseglet 1978 (play)

=== Non-fiction ===
- Sagaens kvinner. 1981.
- Selja og Stad. 1992.
- Den Katolske kirke i Norge. 1993.
- Fra opptakt til nederlag. Luftforsvarets historie. Vol. 1. 1994.
- Fem år i utlegd. Luftforsvarets historie. Vol. 2. 1996.
- Veodalen. 2001.
