= Rasmus Tveteraas =

Norwegian schoolteacher, school inspector, and politician

Rasmus Tveteraas (28 December 1862 – 10 June 1938) was a Norwegian schoolteacher, school inspector, and politician.

He was son of farmer Ole Johannesen Tveteraas and Kari Larsdatter Rongved, and was the father of printmaker Vilhelm Tveteraas and librarian Harald L. Tveterås.

Tveteraas was assigned schoolteacher in Høgsfjord Municipality, and later teacher, headmaster, and eventually school inspector in Stavanger. He was a supplant to the Stortinget from 1922–1924 and 1925–1927, and elected representative from 1928 to 1930.
