= Helge Nordahl =

Norwegian philologist (1927–2018)

Helge Nordahl (12 January 1927 – 31 March 2018) was a Norwegian philologist.

Nordahl graduated from the University of Oslo in 1953 with the cand.philol. degree in French. He was a part-time teacher at Oslo Cathedral School from 1954 to 1956, teacher at Trondheim Cathedral School from 1956 to 1963, lecturer at the University of Bergen from 1963 to 1970, docent at the University of Oslo from 1970 to 1972 and professor of Romance languages at the University of Oslo from 1972 to 1996.

Nordahl took the dr.philos. degree in 1969 with the thesis Les systèmes du subjonctif corrélatif: étude sur l'emploi des modes dans la subordonnée complétive en français moderne. He was a member of the Norwegian Academy for Language and Literature, and served as its praeses from 1988 to 1995. He was inducted into the Norwegian Academy of Science and Letters in 1979. He resided at Gjettum. He died at age 91.
