= Norsk Ordbok (Nynorsk) =

Nynorsk dictionary

Norsk Ordbok (NO) is a comprehensive dictionary of written New Norwegian (Nynorsk) and the Norwegian dialects, in twelve volumes. The work was completed in 2012. It was edited at the University of Oslo, published by the Norwegian publishing house Det Norske Samlaget, and financed by a direct government grant. Generally regarded as the definitive dictionary of Nynorsk, it defines around 25,000 headwords per volume and ends at around 300 000 headwords. Illustrative quotations are drawn both from spoken Norwegian (with a geographical reference) and from literature.

Norsk Ordbok covers the neo-Norwegian period from 1600 onwards, though coverage for the first two centuries is scant, consisting mainly of records of spoken Norwegian. Norsk Ordbok has good coverage of the period from 1850 onwards, the pioneer years of establishing Nynorsk as a written standard.

The collections on which Norsk Ordbok are based were started in 1930, and comprise some 3.2 million literary excerpts and dialect quotations. The slip archives are now digitised, and supplied with a corpus of Nynorsk from 1850 onwards. The collections are accessible through Norsk Ordbok 2014 Search page.

Editing started in 1947, with volume 1 appearing in 1965, volume 2 in 1978, volume 3 in 1994 and volume 4 in 2003. Norsk Ordbok was reorganised in 2002 with a view to speed up editing, and should have been finished in 2014, to coincide with the bicentenary of the Norwegian constitution. Volume 12, the final volume, was published in 2016.

== See also ==
- Store norske ordbok
