= Norsk Riksmålsordbok =

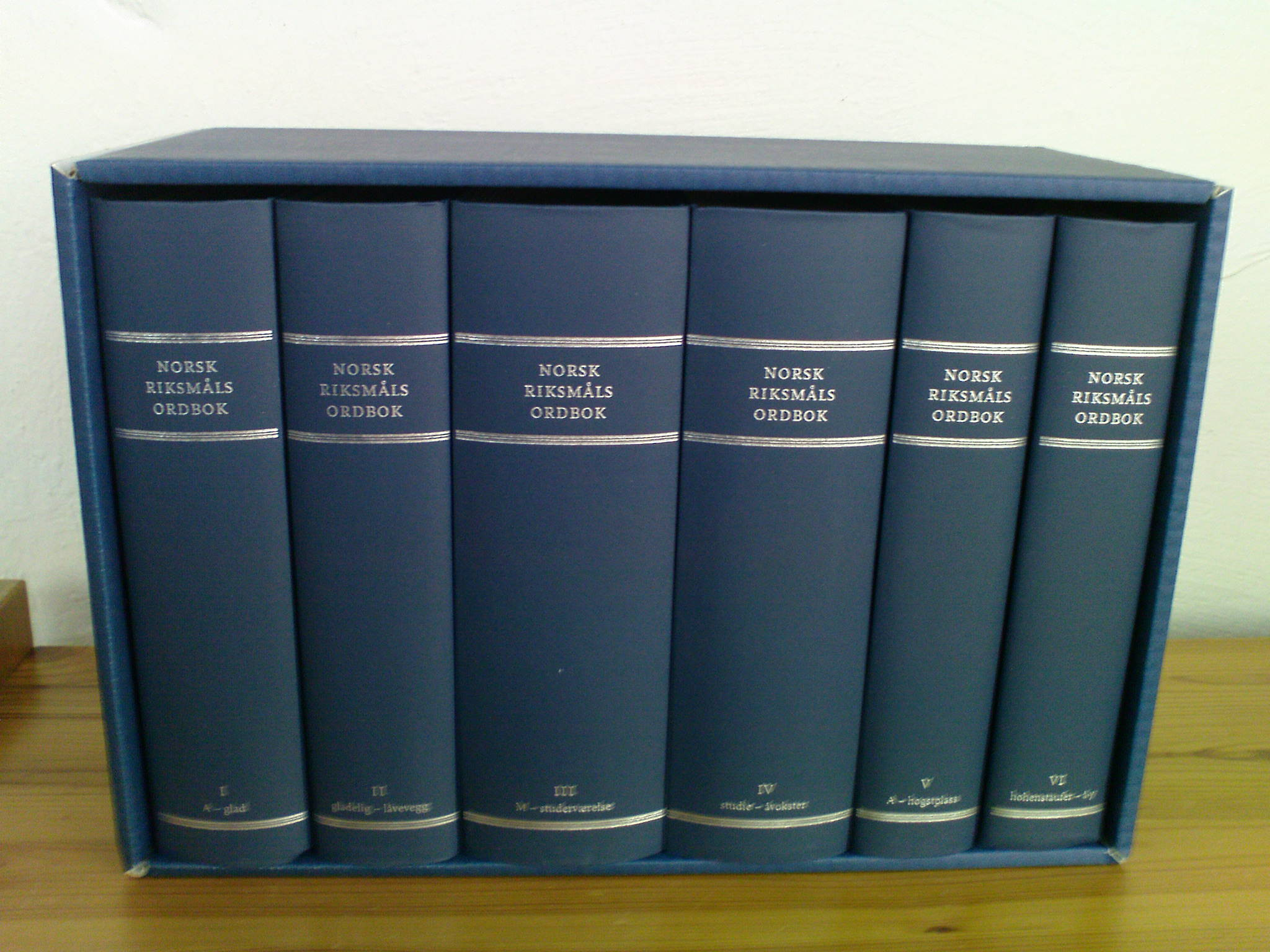
Norsk Riksmålsordbok, second edition

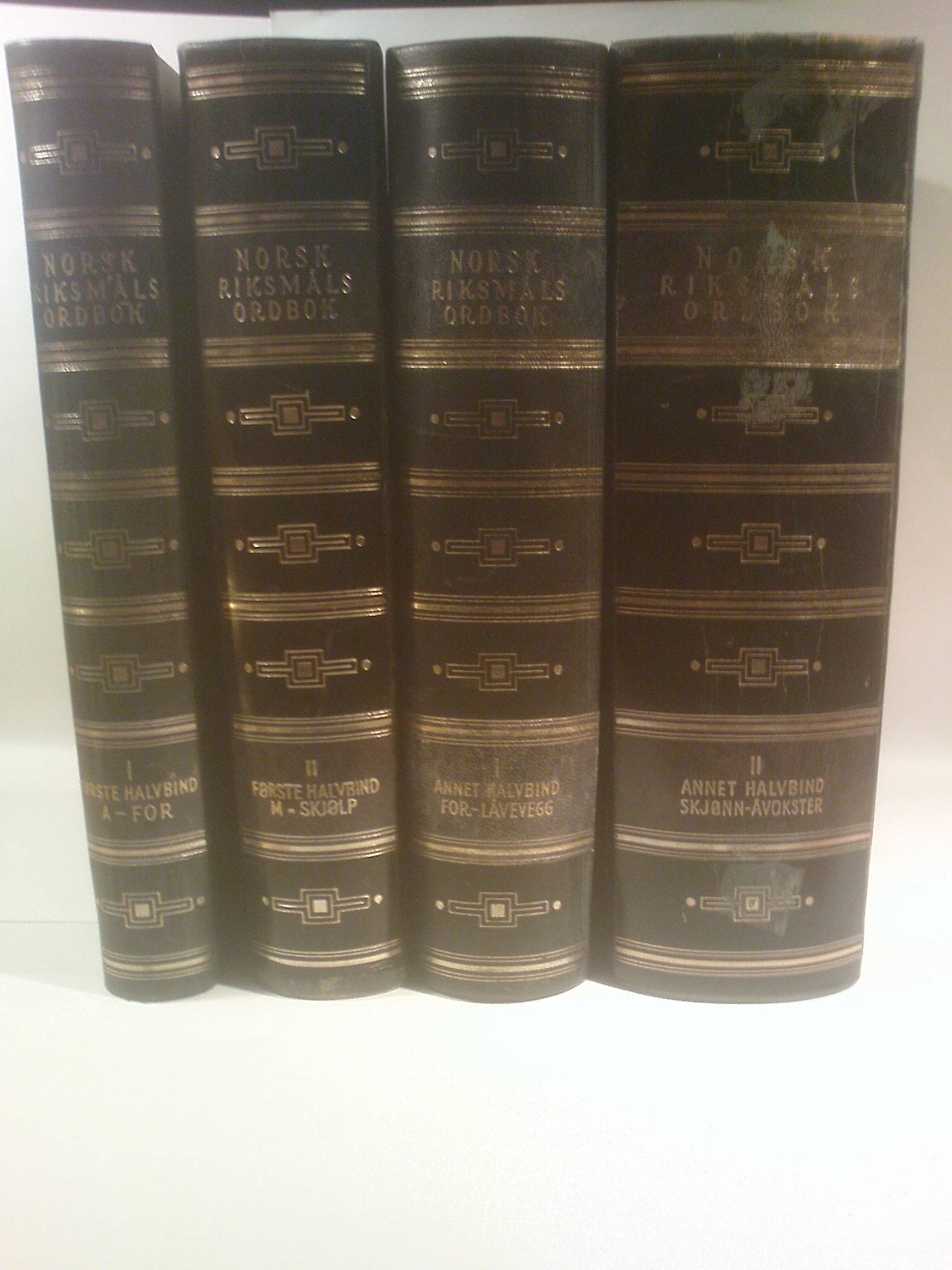
Norsk Riksmålsordbok, first edition

Norsk Riksmålsordbok (Urban East Norwegian: [ˈnɔʂk ˈrɪ̀ksmoːɫsˌuːrbuːk]) is a Norwegian dictionary for the unofficial written language form Riksmål. The work was initiated by Riksmaalsvernet around 1920. Its first edition was completed in 1957, and was printed in four volumes. Two extra volumes were issued in 1995. Editors for volume 1, 2 and 3 were Trygve Knudsen and Alf Sommerfelt, and volume 4 had the same two editors, in addition to Harald Noreng. Noreng was editor for volume 5 and 6, from 1995.

== Background ==
Following a speech by teacher and language activist Jens Mørland in 1918, Riksmaalsvernet was founded 30 October 1919. A dictionary committee was established at a meeting 12 December 1919, and started its work after some delay in 1921.

A preliminary wordlist issued by Riksmaalsvernet in March 1921 led to a fierce linguistics debate in newspapers and in the cultural and literary magazine Samtiden. In 1922 Alf Sommerfelt was appointed as editor for the dictionary. Trygve Knudsen joined the work in 1924, and was co-editor for the project from July 1925. Harald Noreng joined as secretary in 1938, and as co-editor from 1940. The dictionary was issued in parts, starting from 1930, and the work was completed in 1957, and printed in four volumes. From 1981, the Norwegian Academy for Language and Literature has been responsible for the dictionary. A reprint of the four volumes was issued in 1983, and again in 1991.

Following the issue of the four volumes, plans for an additional volume were initiated. After Sommerfelt's death in 1965, and Knudsen's death in 1968, Noreng continued this work. Noreng's extra material resulted in two new volumes, issued in 1995 as volume five and six of the dictionary.

The dictionary work continues in cooperation with the publishing house Kunnskapsforlaget, under the name Det Norske Akademis store ordbok (new name from 2005), and the goal is a revised and extended edition to be completed in 2014.
