= Vilhelm Tveteraas =

Norwegian printmaker, painter and illustrator

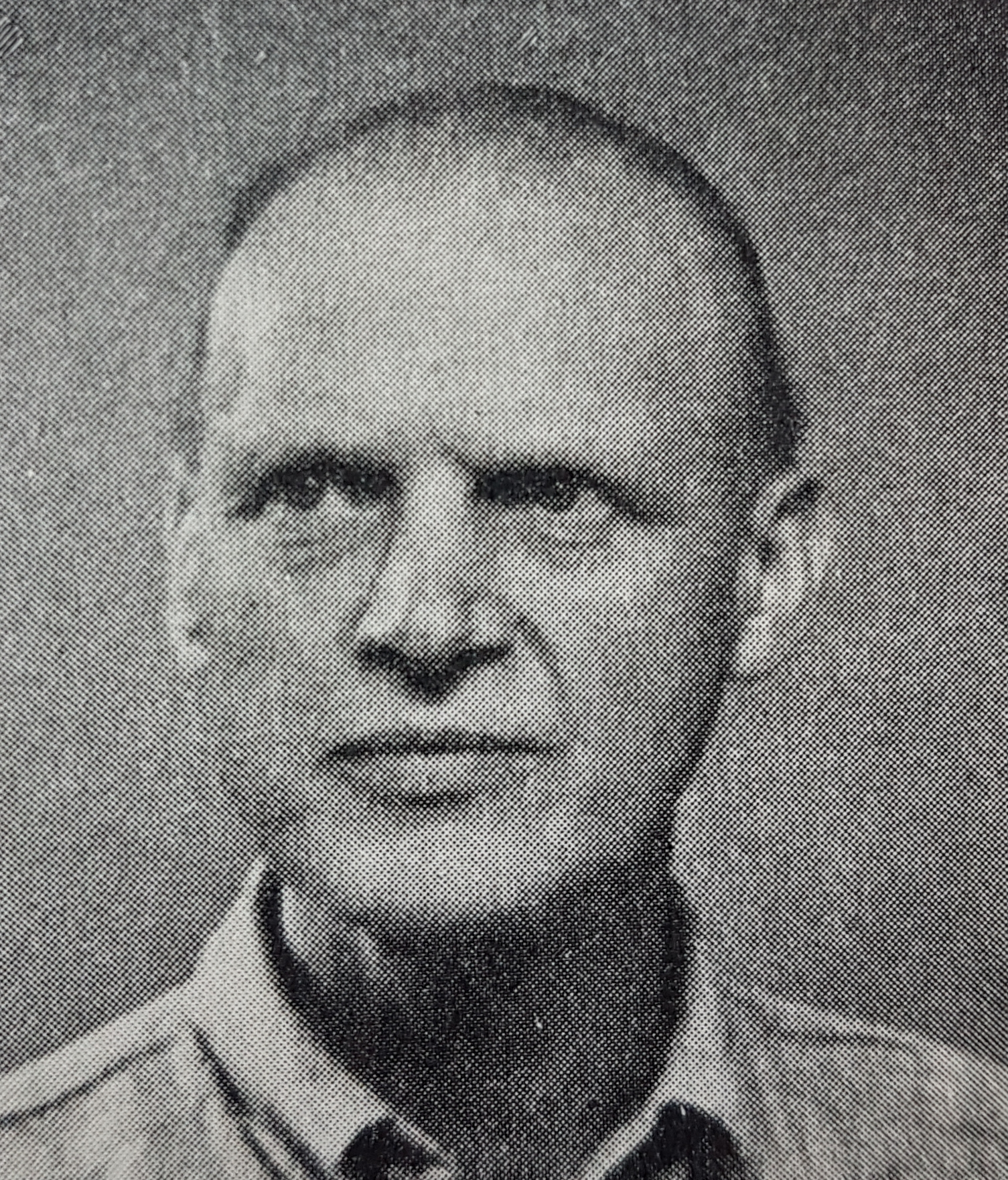
Vilhelm Tveteraas

Vilhelm Tveteraas (18 April 1898 – 4 January 1972) was a Norwegian printmaker, painter and illustrator.

== Personal life ==
Tveteraas was born in Stavanger to school inspector and politician Rasmus Tveteraas and Laurentze Mæle, and was a brother of librarian Harald L. Tveterås. He was married to dancer and choreographer Signe Hofgaard from 1928. Their daughter Tone was married to writer Jens Bjørneboe.

== Career ==
Tveteraas graduated as dentist in 1921, and worked as dentist in Oslo. Parallel to his dentist practice, he developed a career as artist. He is particularly noted for his woodcuts. Among his works are Mann og stut from 1948, Tømmerhoggere from 1952, and Svart-tjønn from 1958, all at the National Gallery of Norway. He is represented at the Museum of Modern Art in New York City, at the Bibliothèque nationale de France in Paris, and the Victoria and Albert Museum in London.
