= Signe Hofgaard =

Signe Hofgaard Tveteraas (2 April 1901 – 9 January 1998) was a Norwegian dancer, choreographer and organizational leader.

She was born in Fredrikshald, and was married to dentist and artist Vilhelm Tveteraas from 1928. Her daughter Tone was married to writer Jens Bjørneboe. After dancing studies in Switzerland and Germany, she made her stage debut in Oslo in 1925. She was co-founder of the organization Norsk Ballettforbund, which she also chaired for several years. She was decorated Knight of the Order of St. Olav for her contributions to Norwegian dance.
