= Norwegian Publishers' Association =

The Norwegian Publishers' Association (Norwegian: Den norske Forleggerforening) is a publishing house association in Norway.

It was established in 1895 by William Martin Nygaard as a sub-group of the Norwegian Booksellers Association. The two separated in 1956.

Its current chair is Tom Harald Jenssen, and managing director is Kristenn Einarsson.
