= Norwegian Academy =

Norwegian literary society

- Formation: 7 May 1953; 73 years ago
- Headquarters: Oslo, Norway
- Members: 51 members
- President: John Ole Askedal
- Website: detnorskeakademi.no

The Norwegian Academy for Language and Literature (Norwegian: Det Norske Akademi for Språk og Litteratur), commonly known as the Norwegian Academy, is a Norwegian learned body on matters pertaining to the modern Norwegian language in its Dano-Norwegian variety, now commonly known as Riksmål and Bokmål. The academy was established in the Norwegian government's honorary residence Grotten in 1953 based on the model of the Swedish Academy and the French Academy, but the idea was originally conceived by Bjørn Bjørnson in 1913. Its members are elected for life on the basis of scholarly, literary or artistic merits. The academy publishes the main dictionary of Norwegian, Det Norske Akademis ordbok ("Dictionary of the Norwegian Academy", www.naob.no), is responsible for regulating the written standard known as Riksmål ("National Language") and has a literary and cultural purpose. The academy awards the Norwegian Academy Prize in memory of Thorleif Dahl.

== History ==
The academy was founded in 1953 by several notable Norwegian authors and poets, among them Arnulf Øverland, Sigurd Hoel, A.H. Winsnes, Cora Sandel and Francis Bull. They disagreed with the official language policy aiming to merge Bokmål with Nynorsk and protested against what they called state discrimination against the dominant Norwegian written standard Riksmål. This was Norway's de facto written language, used by most large newspapers and by the majority of the population as a written standard (although not necessarily a spoken one). The Academy was modelled after the Swedish Academy and the French Academy.

In addition to regulating Riksmål, the most conservative and Danish-near form of Norwegian, the academy publishes dictionaries and supports the publishing of literature in Riksmål. To-day, after several reforms worth in the official Bokmål and in the traditional Riksmål, Bokmål in its "moderate" version and modern Riksmål more or less coincide with some deviations.

The Academy has 51 members (2021), each of whom is a specialist in miscellaneous areas of analysis, investigation and expertise. These include Nordic studies, German, English and French languages and literature, history, philosophy, law, political science, poetry et cetera. The President of the Academy is John Ole Askedal.

The Norwegian Academy for Language and Literature was represented, along with other non-governmental language organisations, in the Norwegian Language Council, which regulates the official Bokmål and Nynorsk languages, since its establishment in 1972 until it was reorganized in 2005.

In 1981, the Academy merged with Riksmålsvernet, founded in 1919.

== Members ==
The following are current members of the Norwegian Academy for Language and Literature:

- Nils August Andresen
- John Ole Askedal
- Bodil Aurstad
- Kjetil Bang-Hansen
- Trond Berg Eriksen
- Liv Bliksrud
- Tor Bomann-Larsen
- Fredrik Bull-Hansen
- Bentein Baardson
- Lars Saabye Christensen
- Arnold Eidslott
- Thor Falkanger
- Ivo de Figueiredo
- Lise Fjeldstad
- Dagfinn Føllesdal
- Karin Gundersen
- Tor Guttu
- Cathrine Grøndahl
- Erik Fosnes Hansen
- Håkon Harket
- Per Egil Hegge
- Nils Heyerdahl
- Roy Jacobsen
- Christian Janss
- Egil Kraggerud
- Sissel Lange-Nielsen
- Hanne Lauvstad
- Mari Lending
- Tom Lotherington
- Jørn Lund (corresponding)
- Carina Nilstun
- Helge Nordahl
- William Nygaard
- Kjell Arild Pollestad
- Per Qvale
- Hilde Sejersted
- Ole Michael Selberg
- Rune Slagstad
- Arild Stubhaug
- Henrik Syse
- Jan Jakob Tønseth
- Helene Uri
- Trond Vernegg
- Finn-Erik Vinje
- Peter Normann Waage
- Egil A. Wyller
- Vigdis Ystad
- Knut Ødegård

== See also ==
- Store norske ordbok
- Language academy
- Swedish Academy
