= Samtiden =

Norwegian political and literary magazine

- Editor: Magne Lerø (2022-present)
- Former editors: Former editors Jørgen Brunchorst and Gerhard Gran (1890-1891); Gerhard Gran (1892-1925); Jacob S. Worm-Müller (1925-1940, 1945-1963); A. H. Winsnes (1940-1942); John Sanness (1963-1969); Torkel Opsahl (1969–79); Helge Rønning, Mariken Vaa and others (1979-1988); Trond Berg Eriksen (1989–1993); Thomas Hylland Eriksen (1993–2001); Knut Olav Åmås 2001–2006); Cathrine Sandnes (2006-2014)
- Categories: politics, literature
- Frequency: 4 per year
- Publisher: Aschehoug (1900-2021); Medier og Ledelse (2022-)
- Founded: 1890; 136 years ago
- Country: Norway
- Language: Norwegian
- Website: www.samtiden.no
- ISSN: 0036-3928
- OCLC: 464037763

Samtiden is a Norwegian political and literary magazine.

== History and profile ==
Samtiden was founded by Jørgen Brunchorst and Gerhard Gran in 1890. The magazine's first publisher was John Griegs forlag (Bergen), and from 1900 Aschehoug (Oslo), until 2021, and from 2022 the magazine was published by the media company Medier og Ledelse.

Gran was the magazine's editor from 1892 to 1925. As of 2002 Thomas Hylland Eriksen was the editor-in-chief of the magazine. Cathrine Sandnes was editor-in-chief since 2006 to 2014.

In 2021 the magazine was awarded the prize Årets tidsskrift (Magazine of the year) from the organization Norsk Tidsskriftforening.

Samtiden is a member of the Eurozine network.

== Editors ==
- 1892–1925: Gerhard Gran
- 1925–1963: Jacob Worm-Müller (except 1940–1942)
- 1940–1942: Andreas Hofgaard Winsnes
- 1963–1969: John Sanness
- 1969–1979: Torkel Opsahl
- 1979–1988: Editorial committee (including Helge Rønning, Mariken Vaa and others)
- 1989–1993: Trond Berg Eriksen
- 1993–2001: Thomas Hylland Eriksen
- 2001–2006: Knut Olav Åmås
- 2006–2014: Cathrine Sandnes
- 2014–2016: Different editor for each issue:
  - 4/2014: Lena Lindgren
  - 1/2015: Espen Søbye
  - 2/2015: Simen Ekern
  - 3/2015: Hege Ulstein
  - 4/2015: Torgrim Eggen
  - 1/2016: Marta Breen
  - 2/2016: Christian Kjelstrup
  - 3–4/ 2016: Christine Amadou
- 2017–2022: Christian Kjelstrup
- 2022– : Magne Lerø
