= Kunnskapsforlaget =

Norwegian publishing company

Kunnskapsforlaget ANS
- Company type: Private
- Industry: Publishing
- Founded: 1975
- Headquarters: Oslo, Norway
- Area served: Norway
- Key people: Thomas Nygaard (CEO/Publisher)
- Products: Ordnett
- Number of employees: 8 (2018)
- Parent: Gyldendal Norsk Forlag
- Website: kunnskapsforlaget.no

Kunnskapsforlaget (Urban East Norwegian: [ˈkʉ̂nskɑːpsˌfɔlɑːɡə]) was a Norwegian publishing company based in Oslo. They published printed books, lexicons, dictionaries and academic prose, and digital dictionaries that are available through the online service Ordnett (launched in 2004).

Kunnskapsforlaget was established in 1975, as a partnership between H. Aschehoug & Co. (W. Nygaard) and Gyldendal Norsk Forlag. The purpose was to co-operate on publishing encyclopaedias and dictionaries. The first volume of Store norske leksikon (SNL) was published in 1978. A total of four editions was published (the last one in 2004), before the online version was transferred to Institusjonen Fritt Ord og Sparebankstiftelsen DnB in 2011.

In September 2018, Gyldendal Norsk Forlag became the single owner of the company.

As of 2018, the publisher had eight full-time employees. The CEO was Thomas Nygaard. In 2020, the publisher was closed. The dictionaries were then fully integrated into Ordnett.
