= Ivar Kristianslund =

Norwegian preacher (1934–2023)

Ivar Kristianslund (1 January 1934 – 20 April 2023) was a Norwegian preacher, former professor of statistics, agronomist, farmer and politician. He was active as a Christian fundamentalist preacher in the self-proclaimed "Church of Norway in Exile", and in the leadership of several minor Christian right political parties from the late 1990s.

== Education and career ==
Kristianslund was educated as an agronomist from the Norwegian College of Agriculture (NLH) in 1959, and as cand.oecon. from the University of Oslo in 1962. He became dr. scient. from NLH in 1963, and dr. philos. in agricultural economics from the Michigan State University in 1972. He worked most of his career at the NLH writing numerous books and dissertations, and was leader of the institute of social economics at the Oslo Business School from 1989 to 1992. He was rector of BI Østfold from 1994 to 1995, and professor of statistics at the BI Norwegian Business School between 1993 and 1997. Later in life he also completed a Doctor of Ministry in theology, his third doctorate, at Knox Theological Seminary at age 85.

== Politics and activism ==
Kristianslund became the leader of the New Future Coalition Party in 1998, which merged into the Christian Unity Party the same year. He was leader of the new party until 2001, when he was dismissed after a court ruled against his leadership of the party, following an internal conflict since the party's national convention. He founded the more fundamentalist party Christian Future later the same year, which only allowed men and those confessing to Lutheran faith to hold formal posts. He left the party to join the Abortion Opponents' List for the 2005 and 2009 elections, from 2008 as party secretary, alongside figures such as Ludvig Nessa, Børre Knudsen and Per Kørner.

In 1998 he criticised a sex-information film from the Department of Health as "solicitating to adultery", and filed charges against Christian Democratic cabinet minister Jon Lilletun. He also filed charges against a children's program by state broadcaster NRK that had arranged a "kissing school" for children. In 1999 he gathered 6,000 signatures demanding the government dismiss bishop Rosemarie Köhn and capellan Siri Sunde from their positions due to their liberal positions on homosexual relations. The same year he also filed charges of blasphemy against the art exhibition "Ecce Homo", which displayed photographs by Swedish artist Elisabeth Ohlson imaging Jesus surrounded by gays and lesbians. He participated in the demonstration against Muslim prayer calling in Oslo in 2000, and has expressed fears of a coming "religious war" in Norway because of increasing numbers of Muslims.

Kristianslund appeared in the first season of Fredrik Skavlan's talk-show Først & sist in 1998. In 2002 he was portrayed with his then-new party in the NRK-documentary "Norwegian fundamentalism", and was described as Norwegian fundamentalists' "most eager spokesman". He has later been active as a preacher in the self-proclaimed "Church of Norway in Exile" (formerly the Deanery of Strandebarm).

== Personal life ==
Kristianslund resided in Greåker, Østfold where he also worked as a farmer. He was married and had eight children. Kristianslund died on 20 April 2023.
