= Freedom, Equality and the Muslim Brotherhood =

- Norwegian: Frihet, likhet og det muslimske brorskap
- Directed by: Per Christian Magnus
- Screenplay by: Walid al-Kubaisi
- Produced by: Elin Andersson, Elin Sander
- Narrated by: Walid al-Kubaisi
- Cinematography: Robert Reinlund
- Production company: Agitator
- Release dates: 25 November 2010 (Fritt Ord, Vika cinema)
- Running time: 50 minutes
- Languages: Norwegian, English, Arabic

Freedom, Equality and the Muslim Brotherhood (Norwegian: Frihet, likhet og det muslimske brorskap) is a Norwegian documentary film written and presented by Walid al-Kubaisi and directed by Per Christian Magnus about the alleged influence of the Muslim Brotherhood in Europe. The film premiered in a screening at Vika cinema in Oslo by the free speech organisation Fritt Ord on 25 November 2010, and was shown on national television by TV 2 on 29 November.

== Overview ==
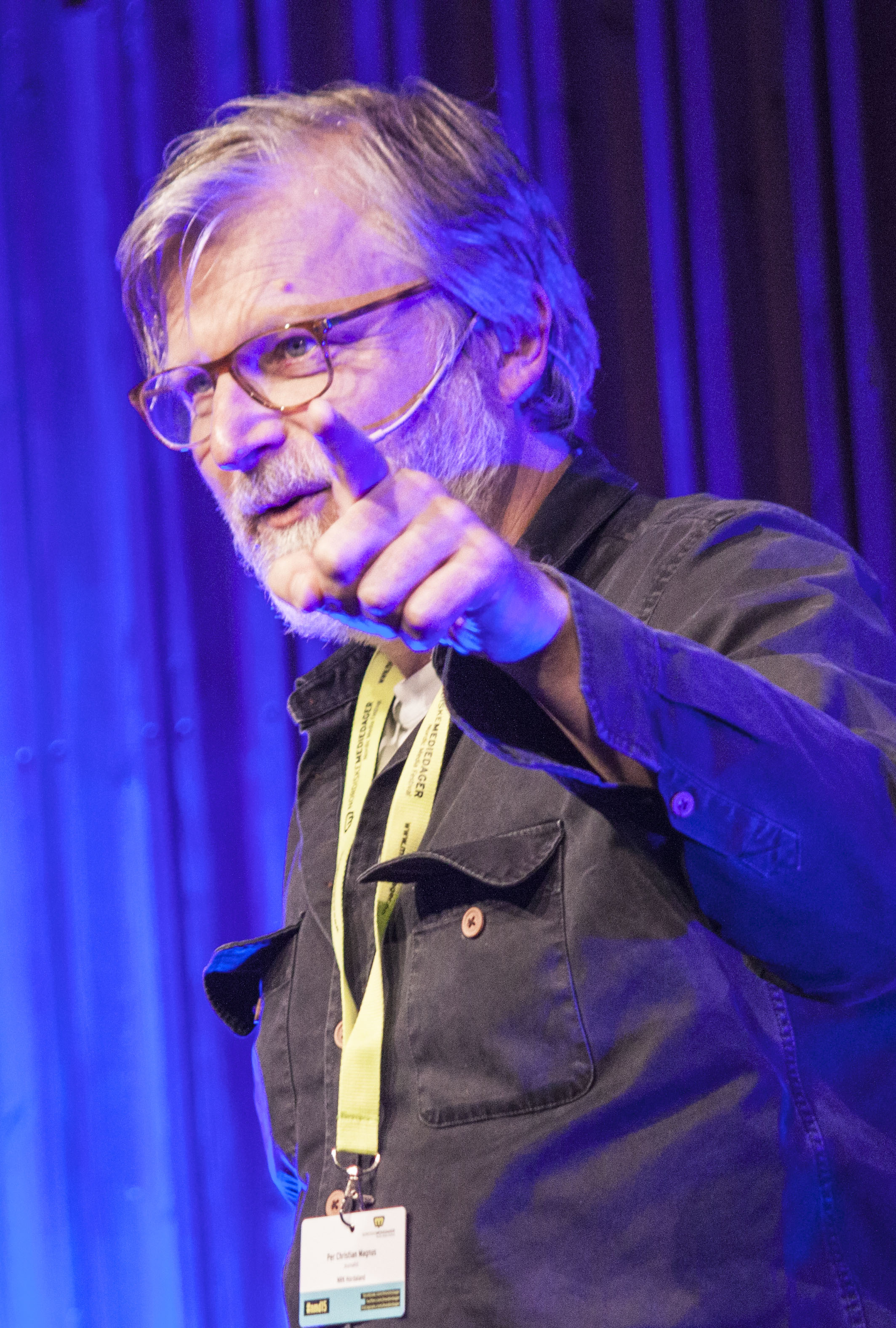
The film was directed by Per Christian Magnus

The film is presented and narrated by al-Kubaisi, who travels to interview notable people for the documentary, "from Yemen to Cairo, and from Oslo to Paris". The film is described as a personal journey into the Muslim world, with liberal intellectuals who live with threats from Islamists, and to the leadership of the Muslim Brotherhood. The film claims to expose how the Muslim Brotherhood infiltrates Western society from within. Among the film's claims is that the use of the hijab, the 2005 French riots and the protests against the Jyllands-Posten Muhammad cartoons were orchestrated by the Muslim Brotherhood.

People interviewed or appearing in the film include Salih Al-Saremy, Mahdi Akif, Mohamed Refaat El-Saeed, Tarek Heggy, Karima Kamal, Gamal al-Banna, Fekry Abdul Muttalib, Sayyid Al-Qemany, Lafif Lakhdar, and Kamil Annajar.

== Reception ==
The premiere at Vika cinema was followed by a panel consisting of Tarek Heggy, Lily Bandehy, Terje Tvedt, and al-Kubaisi, with Jon Hustad as the moderator.

At least four people who had been interviewed in the film, Gamal al-Banna, Karima Kamal, Mahdi Akef, and Mohamed Refaat El-Saeed, later claimed after being reached out to by newspaper Klassekampen that they had been grossly misrepresented in the documentary, and that they did not support a "conspiracy" about the Muslim Brotherhood's alleged influence in Europe.

The film was criticised by commentator Mohammad Usman Rana for being "conspiratorical" and "paranoid". Al-Kubaisi in turn claimed that Rana was a representative for the ideology of the Muslim Brotherhood in Norway. The film was also criticised in a review by Kjersti Nipen in Aftenposten for construing views of how the Muslim Brotherhood allegedly infiltrates Europe from within.

Politician for the Progress Party and refugee from Iran, Mazyar Keshvari supported the film in Aftenposten, saying that it exposed the plans of the Muslim Brotherhood to "Islamise" Europe through "massive immigration". Professor Unni Wikan also supported the documentary in a letter to the editor of Morgenbladet.

Clips from the film soon appeared in translated versions on YouTube and counter-jihadist websites after its release, and its showing on national television has been claimed by social anthropologist Sindre Bangstad to have mainstreamed the Eurabia conspiracy theory in Norway.

== See also ==
- Federation of Islamic Organizations in Europe
