= Opinion polling for the 2009 Norwegian parliamentary election =

Poll results for the Norwegian parliamentary elections that were held in Norway on 13–14 September 2009. The results are shown in chronological order, with the oldest poll at the top of the list and the newest poll at the bottom of the list.

== Poll results ==
Polling Firm	Date	Source	FrP	DNA	H	KrF	SV	Sp	V	Others
Norstat	2008-04		24.7%	29.4%	16.9%	7.1%	5.9%	5.3%	8.4%	2.3%
Response Analyse	2008-04		25.3%	31.6%	15.7%	5.7%	7.5%	5.5%	6.4%	2.3%
TNS Gallup	2008-04		23.5%	31.6%	18.2%	6.9%	6.4%	5.2%	4.9%	3.3%
Norstat	2008-05		30.8%	26.6%	17.0%	6.3%	6.9%	6.3%	5.3%	0.8%
Response Analyse	2008-05		24.8%	28.8%	19.0%	6.8%	7.0%	4.7%	7.0%	1.9%
TNS Gallup	2008-05		26.5%	26.3%	18.4%	6.0%	8.3%	4.7%	6.6%	3.2%
Sentio-Norsk Statistikk	2008-06		29.3%	23.9%	17.9%	6.7%	7.1%	5.2%	5.2%	4.7%
Norstat	2008-06		30.6%	26.0%	15.8%	6.3%	6.7%	6.3%	5.3%	3.0%
Response Analyse	2008-06		30.7%	26.4%	17.8%	4.7%	6.5%	5.3%	5.6%	3.0%
TNS Gallup	2008-06		28.3%	30.3%	16.5%	7.7%	6.1%	3.4%	5.2%	2.5%
Norstat	2008-07		30.7%	28.1%	16.1%	5.6%	5.7%	4.5%	5.6%	3.7%
Norstat	2008-08		32.1%	26.2%	16.2%	5.8%	7.0%	5.0%	5.1%	2.6%
TNS Gallup	2008-08		30.4%	29.2%	15.4%	4.8%	5.7%	4.2%	6.3%	4.0%
Norstat	2008-09		30.7%	29.3%	13.8%	6.5%	6.0%	5.5%	5.4%	2.8%
Response Analyse	2008-09		31.7%	27.9%	14.6%	5.8%	6.1%	5.6%	5.9%	2.4%
Norstat	2008-10		26.3%	32.2%	15.2%	5.7%	7.5%	4.5%	5.9%	2.8%
Norstat	2008-11		27.5%	31.1%	14.5%	6.6%	8.5%	4.8%	5.5%	1.5%
TNS Gallup	2008-12		21.6%	32.4%	16.7%	5.4%	7.9%	6.1%	5.8%	4.1%
Response Analyse	2008-12		21.5%	32.5%	18.2%	6.7%	7.2%	5.9%	6.1%	0.9%
Opinion	2008-12		25.1%	27.5%	19.1%	6.2%	7.5%	5.4%	5.1%	4.1%
Norstat	2008-12		25.7%	30.7%	17.1%	6.1%	8.1%	5.3%	5.1%	1.2%
Sentio	2008-12		24.0%	29.9%	16.8%	6.2%	8.5%	5.9%	5.8%	1.4%
Opinion	2009-01		28.6%	28.7%	15.2%	5.6%	8.1%	6.0%	5.1%	2.6%
Sentio	2009-01		24.5%	36.5%	13.9%	5.9%	6.8%	5.3%	4.5%	2.4%
Synovate	2009-01		19.5%	34.5%	16.6%	5.2%	9.2%	5.5%	5.4%	4.1%
Norstat	2009-02		21.6%	35.4%	15.8%	5.2%	6.8%	5.5%	6.6%	3.0%
Synovate	2009-02		20.8%	35.1%	15.6%	5.9%	8.4%	4.7%	6.8%	2.8%
Norstat	2009-02		29.4%	33.0%	12.6%	5.2%	7.1%	6.5%	5.9%	2.5%
In fact	2009-03		27.2%	32.2%	13.2%	6.5%	6.9%	6.6%	5.0%	2.4%
Norfakta	2009-03		28.0%	31.0%	14.7%	6.9%	6.9%	4.6%	4.7%	3.8%
Norstat	2009-03		30.1%	31.3%	14.1%	5.7%	6.6%	5.0%	5.3%	1.9%
Norstat	2009-03		29.7%	31.7%	13.3%	7.3%	6.9%	5.0%	3.7%	2.3%
Opinion	2009-03		30.9%	28.4%	13.2%	5.6%	6.4%	6.8%	6.1%	2.6%
Response Analyse	2009-03		25.4%	32.8%	14.2%	6.1%	6.0%	5.9%	6.5%	3.2%
Sentio	2009-03		26.9%	32.9%	14.7%	6.5%	6.1%	5.7%	4.5%	2.7%
Synovate	2009-03		23.7%	36.2%	11.5%	4.7%	9.9%	5.5%	5.0%	3.4%
TNB	2009-03		27.4%	32.4%	13.9%	6.1%	7.0%	5.6%	5.0%	2.7%
TNS Gallup/TV2	2009-03		24.7%	35.5%	15.6%	5.2%	7.0%	5.1%	4.5%	2.6%
Sentio/BT	2009-04-02		29.6%	31.5%	13.3%	5.9%	7.1%	5.3%	4.7%	2.6%
TNS Gallup/TV2	2009-04-02		26.0%	35.7%	12.6%	5.1%	7.7%	5.9%	3.4%	3.5%
Norstat/NRK	2009-04-09		26.4%	31.7%	13.7%	7.2%	7.0%	6.8%	4.6%	2.7%
In fact/VG	2009-04-17		25.8%	29.1%	17.6%	6.0%	7.2%	5.1%	5.2%	4.0%
Sentio/DN	2009-04-17		28.4%	29.7%	13.9%	9.0%	5.7%	5.3%	5.0%	3.0%
Norfakta/Nationen/Klassekampen	2009-04-18		27.7%	33.6%	14.1%	6.6%	5.5%	4.7%	5.3%	2.5%
Opinion/ANB	2009-04-23		28.5%	29.1%	13.9%	7.6%	5.9%	5.8%	6.2%	3.0%
Opinion/ANB	2009-04-23		30.3%	34.5%	10.8%	4.8%	6.5%	6.5%	4.2%	2.3%
Synovate/Dagbladet	2009-04-25		25.2%	35.2%	14.0%	7.3%	6.4%	6.0%	3.9%	2.1%
TNS Gallup/TV2	2009-05-04		24.2%	33.0%	14.3%	5.3%	8.9%	4.2%	5.9%	4.2%
Norstat/NRK	2009-05-07		27.7%	34.1%	11.9%	6.5%	6.7%	5.8%	5.9%	1.5%
Norfakta/Nationen/Klassekampen	2009-05-09		26.9%	31.1%	13.9%	6.5%	8.2%	6.1%	4.8%	3.3%
Opinion/ANB	2009-05-14		28.5%	29.0%	13.0%	5.9%	7.1%	4.3%	8.7%	3.3%
Sentio/DN	2009-05-15		30.3%	31.5%	13.2%	5.8%	6.3%	4.0%	5.8%	3.0%
Response/Aftenposten	2009-05-15		24.0%	35.8%	15.3%	5.3%	5.8%	4.7%	5.9%	3.2%
Response/VG	2009-05-15		25.9%	33.3%	15.9%	6.5%	6.0%	6.0%	3.7%	2.5%
Response/Aftenposten	2009-06-12		26.1%	35.4%	13.5%	5.8%	5.5%	4.3%	5.6%	3.8%
Sentio/DN	2009-06-13		29.3%	23.9%	17.9%	6.5%	7.1%	5.2%	5.2%	4.9%
Norstat/Vårt Land	2009-06-26		28.6%	29.4%	13.4%	5.7%	8.3%	6.3%	5.9%	2.4%
Norfakta	2009-07-06		29.8%	32.6%	13.0%	5.7%	6.7%	5.3%	4.6%	2.4%

== Average polling ==
The following table gives the average of 10 monthly opinion polls (9 before December 2008 - Synovate, Opinion, Gallup, Sentio BT, Sentio DN, Norstat NRK, Norstat VL, Response, In fact and, from December 2008, Norfakta).

Party	Result, Parliam. election 2005	Result, County elections 2007	Aug 2008	Sep 2008	Oct 2008	Nov 2008	Dec 2008	Jan 2009	Feb 2009	Mar 2009	Apr 2009	May 2009	Jun 2009	Jul 2009	Aug 2009
Labour	32.7%	30.8%	26.5%	29.0%	30.6%	31.4%	30.7%	33.9%	34.2%	32.8%	32.5%	32.9%	32.9%	33.1%	32.4%
Progress	22.1%	18.5%	30.8%	29.6%	26.5%	24.2%	23.7%	23.2%	24.1%	27.3%	27.0%	26.4%	26.0%	28.2%	25.7%
Conservative	14.1%	18.8%	16.3%	15.4%	16.1%	15.9%	17.4%	16.1%	15.1%	13.8%	13.9%	13.8%	13.5%	12.9%	13.8%
Socialist Left	8.8%	6.5%	6.7%	6.5%	7.3%	7.7%	7.8%	7.5%	7.1%	7.0%	7.1%	7.5%	7.3%	7.2%	8.1%
Christian Democratic	6.8%	6.7%	5.5%	5.6%	5.6%	6.6%	6.3%	6.0%	6.0%	6.2%	6.0%	6.0%	5.8%	5.9%	6.1%
Centre	6.5%	7.8%	5.2%	5.0%	5.3%	5.5%	5.7%	5.5%	4.9%	5.5%	5.8%	5.0%	5.8%	5.1%	5.6%
Liberal	5.9%	5.6%	6.1%	5.8%	5.6%	5.7%	5.5%	4.8%	6.0%	5.0%	4.9%	5.4%	5.6%	4.8%	5.2%
Red	1.2%	2.1%	1.7%	1.6%	1.4%	1.6%	1.6%	1.6%	1.5%	1.2%	1.3%	1.5%	1.5%	1.6%	1.6%
Others	1.9%	3.2%	0.1%	1.4%	0.2%	1.2%	1.4%	1.0%	1.1%	1.4%	1.5%	1.3%	1.4%	1.1%	1.6%

The following table gives the average of poll results through the electoral campaign, the last six weeks before the election. The biggest surprise was the successful campaign of the Conservative Party, which saw a great increase in its poll results at the cost of the Progress Party, up until the election day.

Party	Week 32	Week 33	Week 34	Week 35	Week 36	Week 37
Labour	32.7%	31.9%	32.1%	33.0%	32.0%	33.4%
Progress	26.2%	26.4%	26.5%	23.7%	23.7%	23.0%
Conservative	13.2%	14.3%	13.6%	14.8%	14.9%	16.1%
Socialist Left	7.2%	7.1%	7.3%	8.5%	7.5%	7.0%
Christian Democratic	6.4%	6.1%	6.0%	5.9%	6.5%	6.7%
Centre	6.5%	5.9%	5.8%	5.8%	6.5%	5.8%
Liberal	4.9%	5.2%	5.7%	4.9%	5.6%	5.2%
Red	1.2%	1.7%	1.6%	2.0%	1.8%	1.8%

== NRK polling ==
Polls During the Campaign
Polling firm	Month	Lab.	Pro.	Con.	Soc.	Cen.	Chr.	Lib.	Red
Norstat NRK	August 2008	26%	30.6%	15.8%	6.7%	6.3%	6.3%	5.3%	1.7%
Norstat NRK	September	29.5%	29.2%	13.3%	8.4%	5.3%	5.8%	4.5%	1.3%
Norstat NRK	October	32.5%	26.3%	15.2%	7.5%	4.5%	5.7%	5.9%	1.5%
Norstat NRK	November	31.1%	27.5%	14.5%	8.5%	4.8%	6.6%	5.5%	0.8%
Norstat NRK	December	30.7%	25.9%	17.1%	8.1%	5.3%	6.1%	5.1%	1.2%
Norstat NRK	January 2009	33.2%	24.4%	17.6%	6.6%	4.8%	7.1%	4.2%	0.7%
Norstat NRK	February	35.4%	21.6%	15.8%	6.8%	5.5%	5.2%	6.6%	1.3%
Norstat NRK	March	31.3%	30.1%	14.1%	6.6%	5%	5.7%	5.3%	0.8%
Norstat NRK	April	31.7%	26.4%	13.7%	7%	6.8%	7.2%	4.6%	1%
Norstat NRK	May	34.1%	27.7%	11.9%	6.7%	5.8%	6.5%	5.9%	0.2%
Norstat NRK	June	33%	29.7%	12%	7.1%	4.9%	6.1%	4.2%	0.8%
Norstat NRK	July	33.2%	28.1%	11.3%	7.1%	6%	6.6%	4.9%	1.2%
Norstat NRK	August	33%	25.1%	13.6%	7.1%	6%	6.6%	4.9%	0.8%
Norstat NRK	September (9)	35%	24%	13.1%	5.8%	6.2%	6.9%	6%	2.1%
Synovate NRK	September (10)	33.8%	21.4%	14.5%	9.1%	5.9%	6.9%	4.7%	2.3%
Results	Election day	35.4%	22.9%	17.2%	6.2%	6.2%	5.5%	3.9%	1.3%
