= Per Kørner =

Norwegian priest and anti-abortion activist

Per Kørner (26 April 1936 – 27 September 2018) was a Norwegian priest and anti-abortion activist.

Kørner was a missionary priest in South Africa from 1966 to 1978, and parish priest at Strandebarm Church from 1981 to 1991. He broke with the state governance of the Church of Norway in 1984 in solidarity with anti-abortion priest Børre Knudsen, and was defrocked by a court ruling in 1991. He then continued as priest in the independent Deanery of Strandebarm (also known as the "Church of Norway in Exile") along with Knudsen.

He joined the political party Abortion Opponents' List as deputy leader for the 2009 parliamentary election alongside Ludvig Nessa and Ivar Kristianslund from the "exile church". He has later protested against abortion and homosexuality during Church of Norway church services, kneeling in front of the church altar in the middle of church services, including in the Bergen Cathedral, the St John's Church, Bergen, and the Tromsø Cathedral, when King Harald V has been present for the investiture of new bishops.

Kørner resigned from his church services in 2016 due to cancer, and died in 2018.
