= Jan-Aage Torp =

Norwegian pastor and evangelist (born 1957)

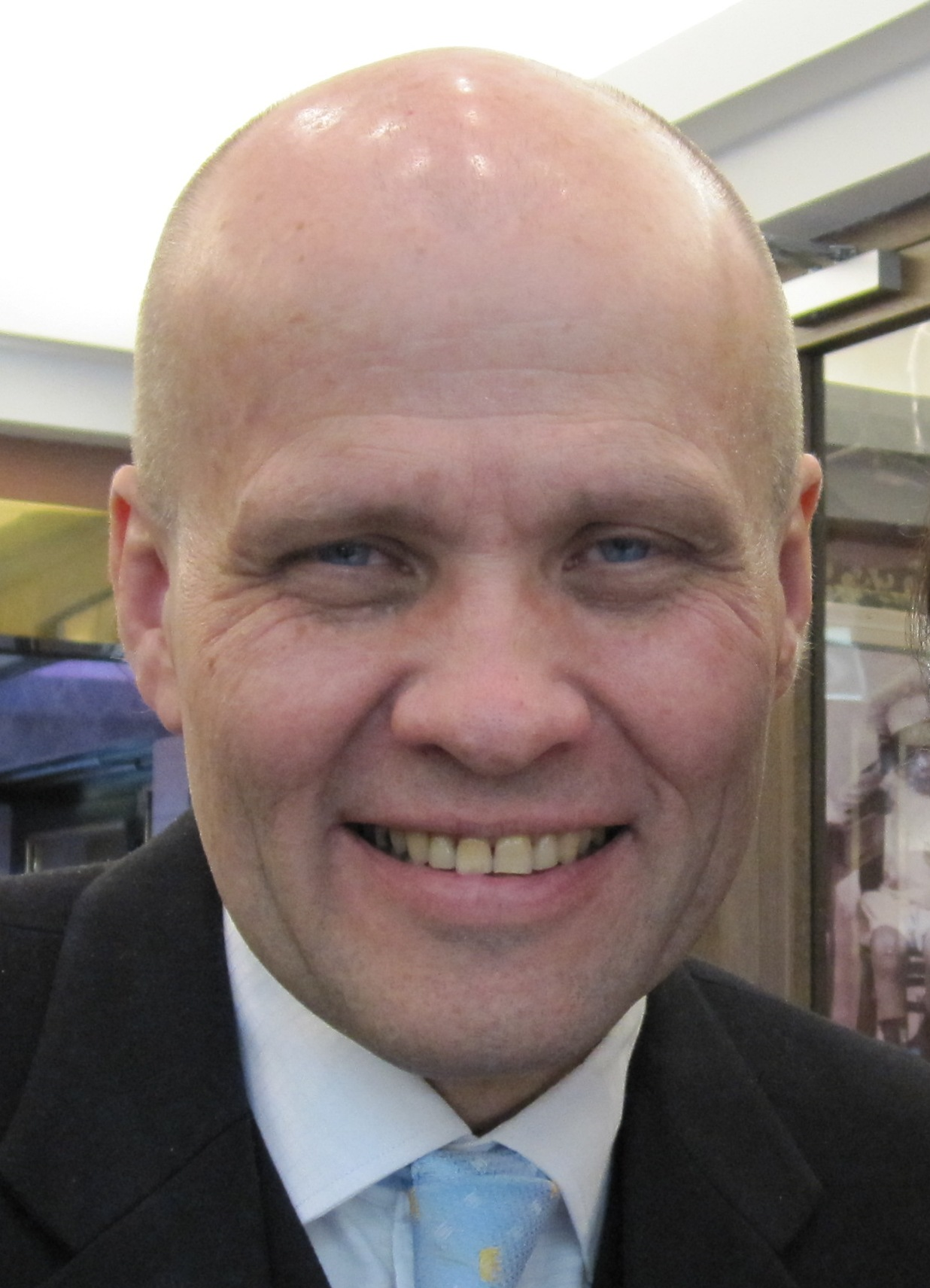
Torp in 2010

Jan-Aage Torp (born 26 June 1957) is a Norwegian pastor of the New Apostolic Reformation church Oslokirken and evangelist and president of the organization European Apostolic Leaders. He has developed an extensive international network, and as of March 2020 hosts the show Hovedstaden med Pastor Torp ('The Capitol with Pastor Torp') on the Christian television station Visjon Norge.

== Biography ==
Torp was born in Kyoto, Japan, to missionary parents, and spent his formative years in Japan and Thailand until moving to Norway in 1971. Active in the Pentecostal community, he eventually became a prolific interpreter for numerous international evangelists including Billy Graham. After having been a pastor in established Pentecostal congregations for some years, he founded Seierskirken ('the Victory Church') in Lillestrøm in 1990. He then became outspoken in his opposition against the homosexual partnership law and against abortion, working together with Finn Jarle Sæle, Børre Knudsen and Ludvig Nessa. Torp has been part of the broader Pentecostal movement in Norway twice, first until February 1990, and again from 1995 to 2009.

In 1993, Torp and Finn Jarle Sæle founded Kristen Koalisjon Norge (KKN), based on the Christian Coalition of America, with the goal of getting as many Christian members of parliament as possible and promoting the Christian Democratic Party. Christian Coalition of America founder Pat Robertson was invited by KKN to speak in Oslo later that year as part of a conference on "biblical spiritual warfare".

From 1997 to 2001, Torp was a member of the supervisory board of the umbrella organization Til Helhet ('To wholeness'), bringing together Christian initiatives to help homosexual people who want to "change their lifestyle". Between 1995 and 2000, Torp built up the organization Til Frihet ('To freedom'), which he claimed to have helped more than a hundred gays and lesbians to change their sexual orientation.

Torp was a member of the Neo-charismatic, New Apostolic Reformation (NAR) organization International Coalition of Apostolic Leaders (ICAL) from 2000 to 2013. He has stated that he was removed as an ICAL member by its leader in 2013. In 2002, the organization European Apostolic Leaders (EAL), and a daughter organization of ICAL, was founded in Norway by NAR founder C. Peter Wagner. Torp became "convening apostle" of European Apostolic Leaders in 2013, which was registered in Norway with two board members, Torp and his wife, Aina Anine Lanton Torp. Other influential NAR prophets such as Lance Wallnau have issued prophecies regarding Torp's divine calling and influence.

In August 2003, Torp founded Oslokirken ('the Oslo Church'), which, after a break in 2009, was restarted in August 2013 under the name Trossamfunnet Oslokirken ('the Oslo Church Faith Community'). The church opened a healing center in 2007, aimed at performing exorcisms; Torp has stated that he can help Satanists through exorcism. Others, such as theology professor and psychiatric institution chaplain Øyvind Eide, have countered, arguing that applying a label of "demon-possessed" particularly to the young and vulnerable is harmful; exorcisms are most commonly performed on women especially in cultures that oppress women.

In June 2004, Torp objected to themes from Greek mythology being used in the opening ceremony of the 2004 Summer Olympics in Athens. He regarded this as an expression of "demonic influence" and claimed in a radio debate that the Olympics would not be held. A few weeks later, he claimed to have received a prophecy that the Olympics would end in a bloodbath. The following year, he publicly apologized for the Olympic prophecies, saying that he deserved much of the criticism he received.

On an NRK news magazine radio program in 2008, Torp defended a Somali Muslim in Norway for the use of "instructive spanking" of children as a natural part of child-rearing; he referred to biblical references about chastisement and love and regarding the Norwegian Supreme Court's 2005 ruling. Children's ombudsman Reidar Hjermann and pastor Andreas Hegertun of the Pentecostal church Filadelfia Oslo spoke out against Torp's viewpoint.

From 2016, he became active in work against the Norwegian Child Welfare Services together with Polish organisation Ordo Iuris, which led him to gain an extensive network among international ambassadors. Norwegian Christian newspaper Vårt Land warned against his alliance with Ordo Iuris, stating that they "stand for values and politics no Christian should endorse. Norwegian Christian leaders have a responsibility to speak out against them."

He has also gained contacts and had personal audience with the world's leading Muslim leaders, including Ahmed el-Tayeb, Shawki Allam and Mohamed Gomaa.

The Norwegian Christian television station Visjon Norge has promoted Torp; in March 2020, a new series premiered, Hovedstaden med Pastor Torp ('The Capitol with Pastor Torp'), in which he interviews Oslo community leaders about current issues.

Prominent aspects of the New Apostolic Reformation movement promoted in Torp and Oslokirken's teachings include spiritual warfare, in which demons are defeated through prayer; spiritual mapping, in which regions are researched to determine their spiritual condition and which demons are controlling them; and the Seven Mountain Mandate. Torp has traveled around the world to promote the Seven Mountain Mandate, a concept formed in 1975 by Loren Cunningham, Bill Bright, and Francis Schaeffer, and later popularized in the 2000s by Lance Wallnau and Bill Johnson. The Seven Mountain Mandate involves Christians taking dominion over seven societal spheres for God: family, religion, education, media, arts and entertainment, business, and government.

Torp is part of the organization Capitol Ministries, which runs exclusive Bible studies for politicians around the world, with the organization's result described as "a mix of American family-values conservativism and contemporary Trumpism". Torp is described as a "Ministry Leader in Norway ministering to public servants through weekly, in-depth discipleship Bible studies."

== Family ==
Since being profiled in a front-page newspaper article in 2009, Torp's son Anders has spoken out publicly about his "extreme" upbringing, which included spiritual warfare, preparing for the end times, twenty-seven exorcisms and fasting for 40 days. Along with journalist Tonje Egedius, he wrote the book Jesussoldaten about his upbringing, which was published in 2016. Torp's daughter Christine has also spoken out about a childhood of being terrified of God, sin and hell, and of having been prepared for being persecuted, tortured and killed because they were Christians in the end times. Two more of his six children have supported the criticism.

== See also ==
- Apostolic-Prophetic Movement
- Independent Network Charismatic Christianity
- Territorial spirit
