= Ludvig Nessa =

Norwegian Lutheran priest (born 1949)

- Born: 11 December 1949 (age 76); Jørpeland, Rogaland, Norway
- Occupation: Priest
- Known for: Anti-abortion activism
- Religion: Christianity (Lutheran)
- Church: Church of Norway (formerly) (Note: While Nessa was defrocked from the Church of Norway in 1991, he remained a member of the church until he rescinded his membership in 2016.); "Church of Norway in Exile" (since 1991)
- Ordained: 1979 (priest)
- Laicized: 1991 (Note: Nessa was defrocked from the Church of Norway in 1991, but continued as a priest in the Deanery of Strandebarm, or the "Church of Norway in Exile".)

Ludvig Nessa (born 11 December 1949) is a Norwegian priest who has been noted as an anti-abortion activist since the late 1980s. Nessa was defrocked from the Church of Norway in 1991, which led him to co-found the independent Deanery of Strandebarm (later known as the "Church of Norway in Exile"), where he continued being a priest. Church services administered by Nessa have been broadcast on Visjon Norge since 2014.

== Pro-life activism ==
Born in Jørpeland in Rogaland, Nessa was ordained as priest of Borge og Torsnes in Østfold in 1979. Nessa first gained attention for his anti-abortion views after a speech he held on 17 May 1984, the national day of Norway, in which he compared abortion to the Bergen-Belsen concentration camp.

In 1987, he founded the "New Life Action" (Aksjon Nytt Liv) along with fellow priest Børre Knudsen in order to stage protests against abortion. They staged their first protest against abortion at a hospital in Oslo, and later protested with symbolic burials of small coffins, and sending dolls drenched in ketchup to public figures and politicians. Nessa was defrocked from the Church of Norway in 1989, confirmed after an appeal to the Eidsivating Court of Appeal in 1991. Together with Knudsen and Per Kørner he thereafter co-founded the Deanery of Strandebarm, also known as the "Church of Norway in Exile".

In 1999, Nessa went into "church asylum" at a bedehus, a traditional local "prayer house", as he was due to serve time in prison for refusing to pay fines received for his anti-abortion protests. He was arrested later the same year and sent to serve 53 days in prison.

For the 2005 and 2009 parliamentary elections Nessa headed the Abortion Opponents' List along with Ivar Kristianslund, Per Kørner and Børre Knudsen.

In 2013, Nessa was notified from tax authorities that he risked being registered as "emigrated from Norway", as since he was evicted from his parish residence in 1991 has been registered as "homeless". He alternated between residing in a prayer house (bedehus) in Fredrikstad and his cabin in Sarpsborg.

Nessa remained a member of the Church of Norway until 2016, when the church voted to allow same-sex marriage, following which he announced official paperwork on Facebook that he had left what he called the "gay church".

Nessa's church services have been broadcast weekly on the Christian television channel Visjon Norge since 2015, and had reached 500 broadcasts by 2022. He has also livestreamed his church services on Facebook, which have been watched by up to 6,000 viewers at a time.

== Other activism ==
=== On Islam and SIAN ===
Nessa has criticised the increasing influence of Muslims and Islam in Norway, and stated that only "true Christians" will be able to "resist Islam". He has proposed and stated his willingness to burn the Quran after comedian Otto Jespersen in 2006 burned a Bible, and he has voiced his support for American Quran-burning pastor Terry Jones.

In 2019, Nessa held a speech at a demonstration of Stop Islamisation of Norway (SIAN) in Kristiansand where a Quran was burned. In his speech he called for Islam to be banned. As an anti-Islam activist he has participated in later SIAN-demonstrations as well, and held church services titled after his experiences, including in 2021 after his participation in a SIAN-rally in Sarpsborg.

Nessa has said that it "has to go wrong" when hundreds of thousands of children have been murdered by abortion in Norway and been replaced by Muslims.

=== "Banishment" of government and politicians ===
Nessa has suggested that the 2011 Norway attacks may have been caused spiritually as a result of Norwegian abortion policies. As part of an annual rally against abortion on the date of its legalisation in Norway, 13 June, Nessa and his followers had previously routinely "banished" the government quarter that was eventually bombed on 22 July 2011.

In 2012, he sent emails to Norwegian members of parliament, denouncing a bill that would separate the church from the state as a "coup" and a "revolution", and threatening to "banish" Norwegian politicians responsible for it.
