= Walid al-Kubaisi =

Iraqi-Norwegian writer (1958–2018)

- Born: 9 February 1958; Baghdad, Iraq
- Died: 31 July 2018 (aged 60); Oslo, Norway
- Education: University of Baghdad
- Occupations: Author; writer; journalist; translator
- Notable work: Freedom, Equality and the Muslim Brotherhood (2010)
- Awards: Fritt Ord Honorary Award; Skjervheim Award

Walid al-Kubaisi (9 February 1958 – 31 July 2018) was a Norwegian-Iraqi author, writer, journalist, translator and government scholar. A public intellectual of Muslim background, he was noted for his social commentary on the integration of immigrants in Norway, and for his broad-based, vocal criticism of political Islam—he notably criticised the alleged influence of the Muslim Brotherhood in Europe in the documentary film Freedom, Equality and the Muslim Brotherhood in 2010.

== Personal life and career ==
Al-Kubaisi was born in Baghdad, Iraq, and received a bachelor's degree in electronic engineering at the University of Baghdad. He fled Iraq as a political refugee in 1981 owing to war, first to Syria and Lebanon, before he arrived in Norway in 1986 and gained Norwegian citizenship. He had by then been imprisoned in Syria, and been attempted to be recruited for a suicide attack as a soldier in the Palestinian resistance, while working as a journalist for newspapers controlled by the PLO. While stating that he came from a Sufi tradition within Islam, he regarded himself as an "apostate" shortly after his arrival in Norway, and was later on the record as an "atheist", but also a "secular Muslim".

In Norway, he was nominated to the Brage Prize for his debut book Min tro, din myte. Islam møter norsk hverdag in 1996, and won the Skjervheim Award in 2003 for his "fearless" cultural work. He was known for his active participation as an intellectual in the Norwegian public debate about immigration and integration, and for his criticism of Islam, which sparked controversy. While living in Arendal in the early 1990s, he was violently attacked twice after having a fatwa declared against him in 1993; he thereafter moved to Oslo. He was appointed a government scholar in 2007, and received the Fritt Ord Honorary Award in 2016 for his "insightful contributions to the Norwegian public for two decades".

Al-Kubaisi's literature included novels, nonfiction, essay collections and children's books. In addition to writing books himself, he translated selected Norwegian literature by Erling Kittelsen, Håvard Rem, Jan Olav Brynjulfsen, Kirsti Blom, Camilla Juel Eide, Arnljot Eggen, Ingvar Ambjørnsen, Kjell Askildsen and Dag Solstad to Arabic. He also translated Arabic poetry to Norwegian, including poems by Muhammad al-Maghut, Muniam Alfaker, Faisal Hashmi, and Eftikhar Ismaeil.

He worked as a journalist for the weekly newspaper Dag og Tid for the last fifteen years of his life. Like the written form used by the newspaper, he was very fond of the written standard Nynorsk. He was also known for writing poetry, and from 2011 published his own anti-Islamist blog with support from Fritt Ord. He was a board member of Ex-Muslims of Norway from 2016.

In 2010, he wrote the script for and narrated the documentary film Freedom, Equality and the Muslim Brotherhood. He wrote the book Blekk og blod: ei familiekrønike fra Midtausten og Noreg, a part autobiography, in 2016. He was working on a second film, about Norwegian values and identity at the time of his death.

Al-Kubaisi died in 2018 of cancer.

== Views on political Islam ==
Al-Kubaisi for a long time warned against political Islam in Europe. He argued that the hijab was a political uniform for the militant Islamist movement, and maintained, that if Islamists were to be successful in making the hijab synonymous with Islam, they would have achieved a victory in the West which they had not been able to accomplish in Muslim countries. He also claimed that the hijab was only created in the 1980s after Ayatollah Khomeini's Islamic Revolution, and that it, unlike traditional national Islamic dresses, is a dress exclusively created for the universal political Islamist movement.

He claimed that Tariq Ramadan was an Islamist, who "spoke with two tongues": smoothly and articulate in the West, yet purely Islamist in the Muslim community and the suburbs. He held that Ramadan sought to Islamise the West, but in a more patient manner than the likes of Osama bin Laden. Al-Kubaisi also introduced the term "Islamo-leftism" in the Norwegian public debate, claiming that the political left in Norway had allied themselves with "extreme Islamic right-wing forces".

He believed that the Muslim Brotherhood was the "mother organization" for the world's Islamist political ideology. He said that the Muslim Brotherhood has a plan to conquer Europe by the hijab, high birth rates and democracy; Islamists were exploiting Western democracy to reach their own anti-democratic goals. His 2010 documentary Freedom, Equality and the Muslim Brotherhood discussed this, in which he also interviewed several Arab intellectuals who espoused his views. He also claimed that notable Norwegian Muslims such as Mohammad Usman Rana, Lena Larsen and Basim Ghozlan represented the ideology of the Brotherhood in Norway, and that Abid Raja of the Norwegian Liberal Party was a "running boy" for Islamists.

He has been described by social anthropologist Sindre Bangstad and Mohammad Usman Rana as a "propagator of Eurabia-views", and that his documentary echoed "Eurabia-literature". His documentary also proved very popular on counter-jihad websites. In February 2011, al-Kubaisi participated in a meeting hosted by Stop Islamisation of Norway where he held a speech, after having established contacts with the organisation since 2004.

== Works ==
=== Bibliography ===
- Ed. Allahs lille brune: Koranen og profetens ord i utvalg [Allah's little brown book: the Quran and the prophet's words in selection]. Co-edited with Johanson, Ronnie. Religionskritisk forlag. 1989. ISBN 9788272650154.
- Min tro, din myte: islam møter norsk hverdag [My faith, your myth: Islam meets Norwegian everyday]. Aventura. 1996. ISBN 9788258812125.
- Sindbads verden [Sindbad's world]. Pantagruel. 1997. ISBN 9788279000006.
- Halvmånens hemmeligheter [The secrets of the crescent]. Pantagruel. 1998. ISBN 9788279000150.
- Norske poteter og postmodernistiske negre: kulturelle kollisjoner og misforståelser [Norwegian potatoes and post-modernistic negroes: cultural collisions and misunderstandings]. Kulturbro. 2000. ISBN 9788291234274.
- Rasisme forklart for barn: en bok for barn i alle aldre, og med alle hudfarger [Racism explained for children: a book for children of all ages, and with all skin colours]. Pantagruel. 2001. ISBN 9788279001270.
- Blekk og blod: ei familiekrønike fra Midtausten og Noreg [Ink and blood: a family chronicle from the Middle East and Norway]. Dreyer. 2016. ISBN 9788282651783.
- Hvordan forklarer du rasisme for barna dine?: en bok som burde vært helt unødvendig [How do you explain racism for your children?: a book that should be completely unnecessary]. Pantagruel. 2021. ISBN 9788234400872.

=== Documentary film ===
- Freedom, Equality and the Muslim Brotherhood (2010), screenplay, narrator
