= Norwegian Patriots =

Norwegian Patriots NorgesPatriotene
- Leader: Øyvind Heian
- Founded: 2007
- Dissolved: 2009
- Ideology: Norwegian nationalism Anti-immigration
- Political position: Far-right

The Norwegian Patriots (Norwegian: NorgesPatriotene, NP) was a short-lived political party in Norway led by Øyvind Heian whose sole aim was to stop non-western immigration to Norway. The party ran for election limited to the county of Vestfold in the 2009 parliamentary election, where it received a mere 184 votes. The disappointing result lead to the party being "put on ice", and on 23 September it was announced that the party was dissolved.

== Activities ==
In June 2009, Stop Islamisation of Norway (SIAN) was joined by Heian for a rally against Islam in Oslo. The rally was ended before it had started, as the group came in a violent clash with left-wing activists. The police claimed that the left-wing activists were the active part of the clash. The newspaper Verdens Gang claimed that there was a mobile text messaging campaign involving the far-left Blitz-movement and the Red Party organising a counter-demonstration.

In August 2009, Heian was attacked during a school debate in Tønsberg by activists from SOS Rasisme. During much of the debate, items were thrown against Heian; presumably hit by a bottle from one of the audience, he was left bleeding from his head and had to receive medical aid.

=== Parliamentary elections ===
Year	Result #	Result %	Seats
2009	183	0.0% #18	0
