= Christian Conservative Party =

Christian Conservative Party Kristent Konservativt Parti
- Leader: Karl J. Granberg
- Founded: 1965
- Dissolved: 26 September 1998
- Succeeded by: Christian Unity Party
- Ideology: Christian right Social conservatism
- Political position: Right-wing

The Christian Conservative Party (Norwegian: Kristent Konservativt Parti, KKP) was a political party in Norway which was originally formed in 1965 as the Democratic Party of Norway. The party was later also known as the Christian Democrats and the Peace Party, before it became the KKP. The party was for many of its last years led by Paul Granberg, however with his death the remaining power in the movement withered. The party never achieved any large following.

== History ==
The party was founded in 1965 as the Democratic Party of Norway (Norges Demokratiske Parti) by Sverre Skien in Karmøy Municipality. The party was at first a minor conservative party with its largest following by maritime workers.

The party did not receive much attention, until 1979, when the party was couped by Leif Karlung who used it to put up extreme-right persons as candidates for the election. When this was revealed, the party excluded all persons in question, and changed its name to the Christian Democrats (Kristendemokratene). In 1983 the party again changed its name to the Peace Party (Fredspartiet) which was used until 1989 when it was changed again, this time to the Christian Conservative Party. On 26 September 1998, the party finally merged with the New Future Coalition Party to form the Christian Unity Party.

== Political profile ==
The party was pro-life and opposed to membership of the European Economic Community. The party criticised the Christian Democratic Party for having let itself become "liberalised", and for compromising too much with other parties. It also opposed immigration and foreign aid.
