= Finn Thoresen =

Norwegian politician

Member of the Norwegian Parliament
- In office 1989–1993
- Constituency: Akershus

Personal details
- Born: 21 January 1944 (age 82) Spydeberg, Norway
- Party: Progress, New Future Coalition Party

Finn Thoresen (21 January 1932 – 30 May 2004) was a Norwegian businessman and politician for the Progress Party.

He was a member of the central administration of the Progress Party (then Anders Lange's Party) from 1973 to 1976, and was chairman of its Østfold chapter from 1974 to 1975. From 1983 to 1990 he was the deputy mayor of Ski.

He was elected deputy Member of Parliament (MP) for the Progress Party from Akershus from 1981 to 1985, and in 1989 he was elected as a regular MP. In November 1992 he however left the party, citing strong disagreements with the influence and development of the Youth of the Progress Party, which he claimed had "misunderstood" liberalism. He said he did not want to be "associated with gay marriages and liberal porn legislations". He founded the New Future Coalition Party in early 1993, but failed to be re-elected to parliament.
