= Stop Islamisation of Norway =

Norwegian anti-Muslim group

- Abbreviation: SIAN
- Formation: 2000
- Location: Norway
- Leader: Arne Tumyr
- Key people: Arne Tumyr; Erik Gjems-Onstad
- Website: www.sian.no

Stop Islamisation of Norway (Norwegian: Stopp islamiseringen av Norge, SIAN) is a Norwegian anti-Muslim group that was originally established in 2000. Its stated aim is to work against Islam, which it defines as a totalitarian political ideology that violates the Norwegian Constitution as well as democratic and human values. The organisation was formerly led by Arne Tumyr, and is now led by Lars Thorsen.

By 2011, it was reported that the organisation had close to 13,000 members or "likes" on its Facebook group, although it gathered only a modest attendance at its meetings and demonstrations. The organisation itself claimed 3,000 members, mainly based in Oslo but followed by Stavanger. These figures made it by far the biggest organisation of the Stop Islamisation of Europe (SIOE) counter-jihad network. In 2012 SIAN broke with the mother organisation SIOE, which it had joined in 2008. Since 2019, the group has become known for burning the Quran at their rallies.

== History ==
=== Early history ===
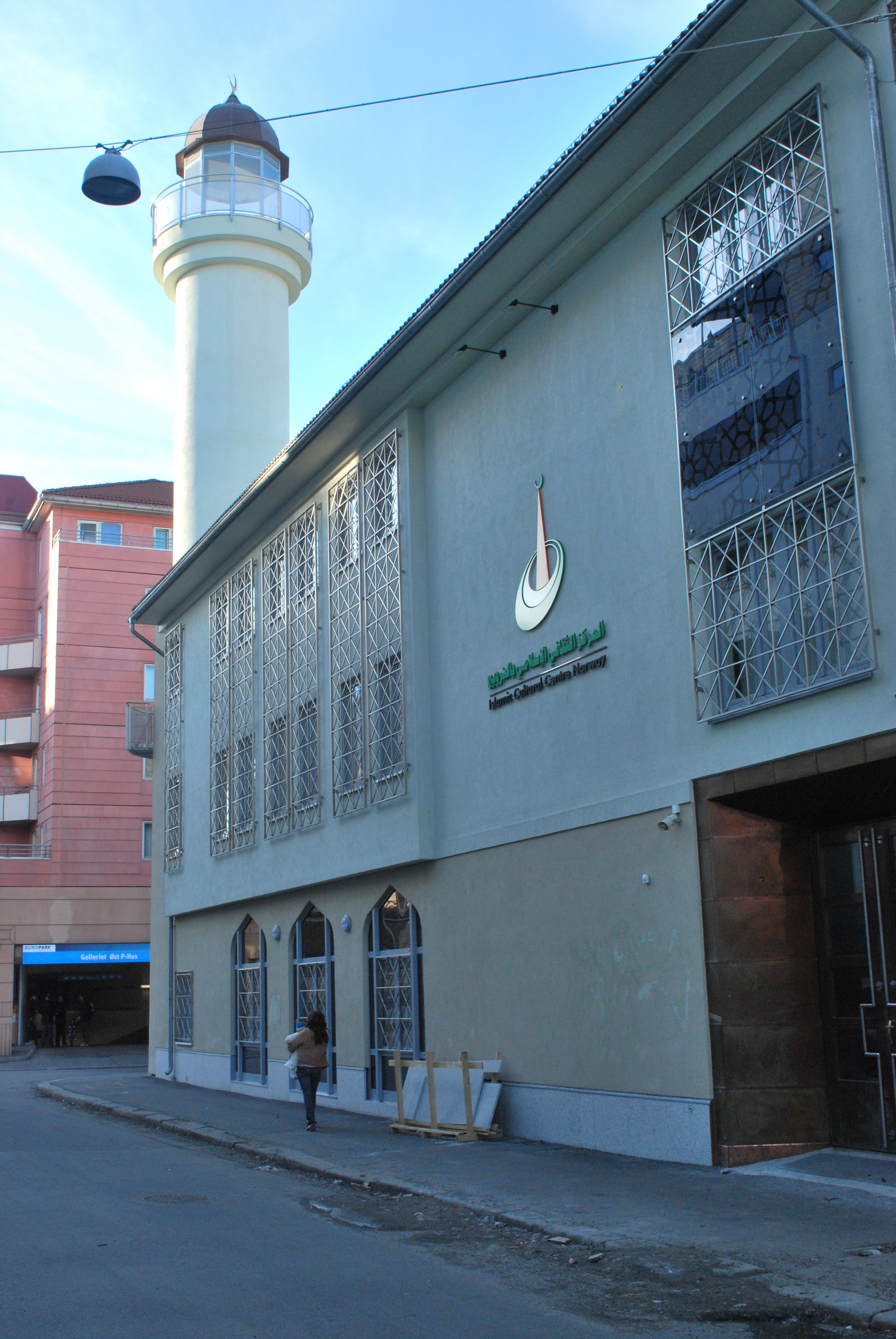
The Islamic Cultural Centre in Oslo, which prompted the establishment of the group in protest against a request for prayer calling by loudspeakers.

The predecessor to SIAN was started in early 2000 as the Action Committee Against Prayer Calling (Aksjonskomiteen mot bønnerop), originally to protest against a request by the Islamic Cultural Centre to broadcast the Adhan (prayer calling) at a local Oslo Mosque using loudspeakers. In March 2000, the group, led by Anne-Liv Gamlem held a demonstration with 150 protesters in Oslo, which also included Ivar Kristianslund holding a speech, both leaders in the minor Christian Unity Party.

On 11 September 2000, the group changed its name to Forum Against Islamisation (Forum mot islamisering, FOMI) as the first organised, explicitly anti-Islam activist group in Europe, unique in predating the September 11 attacks. One of the founders of the group and its leader was Jarle Synnevåg, a senior researcher with the Norwegian Defence Research Establishment who in 2001 had to resign his job and was later convicted for racism against Muslims. Another early member was former resistance member Erik Gjems-Onstad, who was the internal meeting leader of FOMI from 2001 to 2009.

In November 2000, about a dozen members of FOMI held a demonstration against Adhan from Mosques in Norway and Islamisation. Legislation to ban Adhan by loudspeakers was proposed in parliament by Carl I. Hagen and the Progress Party, but was voted down by all other parties. In 2004, the two Jewish founders of the Norwegian Israel Centre were expelled from the Mosaic Religious Community (Jewish community of Oslo), after they had joined FOMI and the minor Democrats party for the annual commemoration of the Kristallnacht.

The organisation later became influenced by the Eurabia conspiracy theory and counter-jihad blogger Fjordman which both began in 2005.

=== Stop Islamisation of Norway ===
In 2007 Arne Tumyr became the leader of the group. As a new series of national groups affiliated with Stop Islamisation of Europe (SIOE) started to become established around Europe, the name was in 2008 changed to its current name, Stop Islamisation of Norway. After this, the group became more prominent in the media and on the streets.

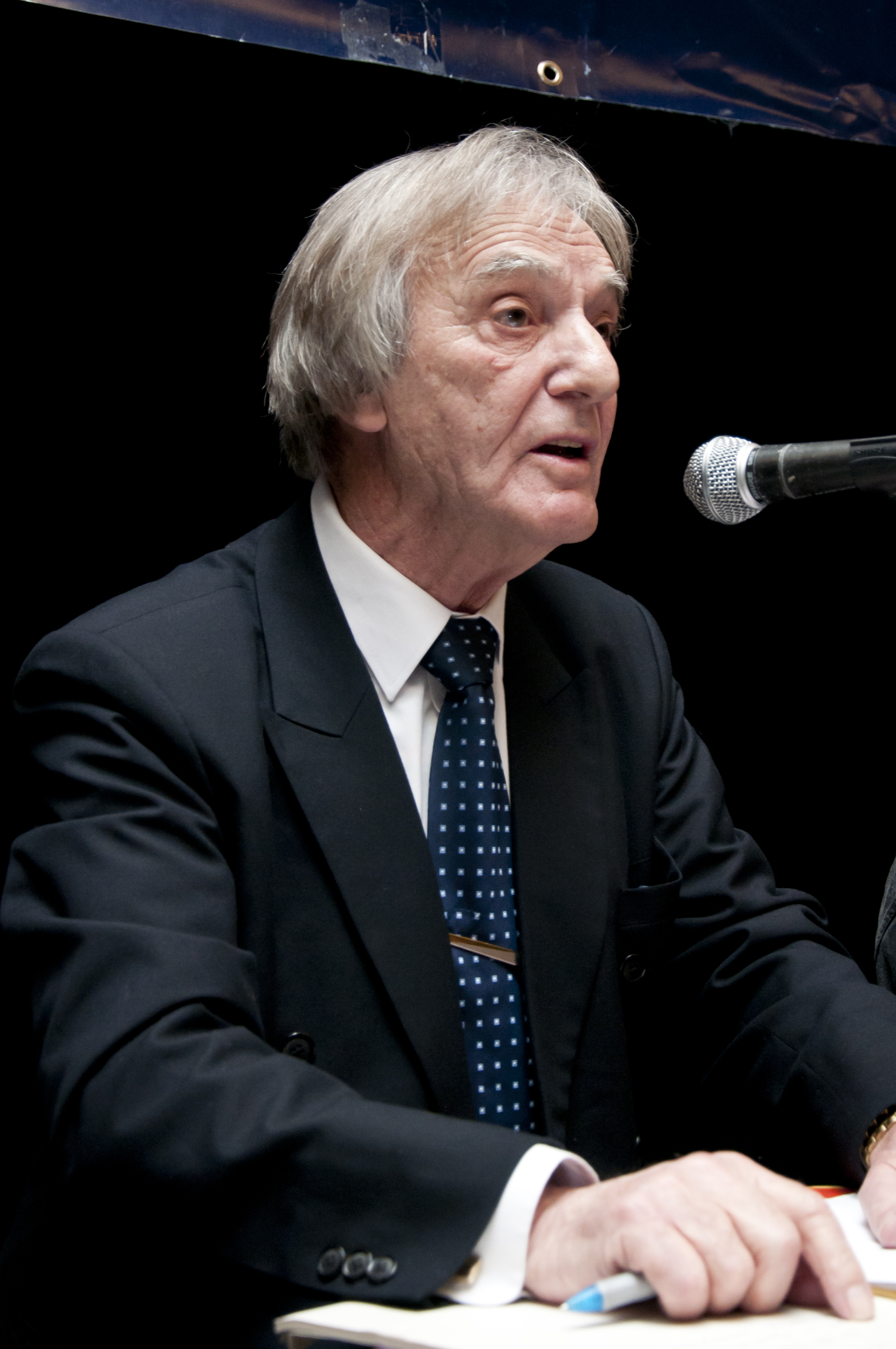
Arne Tumyr, former leader of SIAN, at a Bergen Student Society debate in 2012.

SIAN was joined by the leader of the minor Norwegian Patriots party, Øyvind Heian in May 2009 for an anti-Islam demonstration in Oslo. They were heavily outnumbered by counter-demonstrators and needed police protection. Tumyr then compared Muslim immigration to Norway with the Nazi invasion of Norway in 1940. In June 2009, SIAN was again joined by Heian for a demonstration in Oslo. The Blitz movement and the Red Party in turn held an illegal counter-demonstration, against what they called "Nazis and racists". Both demonstrations were attacked by counter-protesters.

Tumyr and SIAN were joined by the leader of the Democrats party, Vidar Kleppe, for speeches when SIAN held a rally in Bergen in August 2010. SOS Rasisme held a counter-demonstration at the event. In September 2010, SIAN held a commemoration of the September 11 attacks, and were joined by the leader of SIOE, Anders Gravers Pedersen. Some groups of SOS Rasisme and Blitz movement activists tried to disrupt the event.

The leader of the local Nordstrand chapter of the Socialist Left Party in Oslo, Morten Schau, joined SIAN to some controversy in January 2011. He resigned from the Socialist Left Party later the same day, after the leader of the Oslo chapter deemed membership of SIAN as "incompatible" with being a member of the party.

In February 2011 Norwegian-Iraqi Walid al-Kubaisi joined a meeting hosted by SIAN, where he held a speech. The Blitz movement demonstrated outside the arrangement, and al-Kubaisi needed police escort to get to the meeting. In 2016, Danish Lars Hedegaard and Swedish-Somali Mona Walter held speeches at conferences hosted by SIAN.

In 2012 there was a split in the organisation after Tumyr refused to cooperate with the recently formed Norwegian Defence League (NDL). SIAN then left the mother organisation SIOE, while members Merete Hodne and Kjersti Margrethe Adelheid Gilje formed SIOE Norway that became affiliated with SIOE. Hodne and Gilje had earlier the same year started a local SIAN radio show in Sandnes on the Radio Kos channel.

Stig Andersen became the leader of SIAN in 2014. In 2017 the group had a booth at the political festival Arendal Week, but were eventually told to leave after there were clashes at its booth following accusations of racism. Starting in 2019, Progress Party leader Siv Jensen stated that membership of SIAN was not compatible with being a member of the party, and began a process of expelling members of SIAN from the party ranks.

==== Lars Thorsen leadership ====
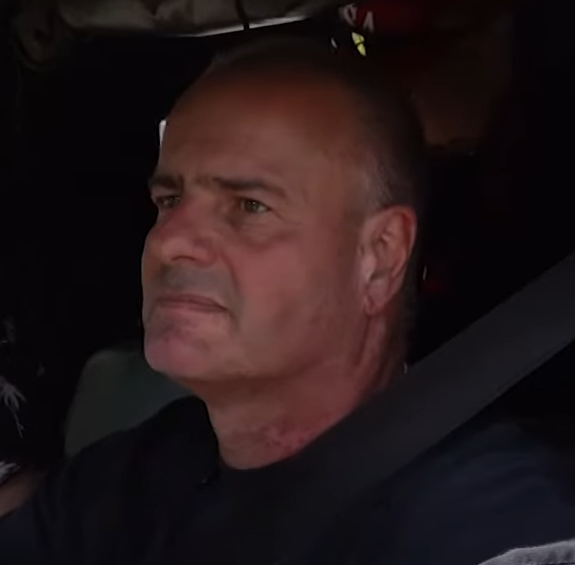
Lars Thorsen, leader of SIAN since 2019

As Lars Thorsen became leader of SIAN in 2019, the group has started to repeatedly burn and desecrate the Quran at their rallies, and in front of mosques. Some days before the first Quran-burning, Thorsen was sentenced to 30 days suspended imprisonment and 20,000 NOK for hate speech in flyers distributed by the group. In 2020, Thorsen was attacked and beaten bloody and unconscious at a rally in Bergen after having called Muhammad a "depraved false prophet". Later the same year, he participated in a primetime debate show on state broadcaster NRK, in which he named some of the many Muslims he wanted to have deported from Norway.

After a Quran-burning event in July 2022, a vehicle with five SIAN-activists including Thorsen was deliberately crashed into, causing their vehicle to be flipped around onto its roof. A woman was arrested after the attack. In October 2022, Thorsen was sentenced to three weeks in jail for having sprayed red defence spray in the face of three men at three different SIAN-rallies.

== Views by commentators ==
In a comment in Aftenposten in 2004, Jahn Otto Johansen called the former FOMI "extremely Muslim-hostile." The then secretary general of the Norwegian Humanist Association, Lars Gule, has also stated that the organisation "uses a hateful and vulgar language with a clearly discriminating content." In December 2005, the court decision against NHA fell in the case of libel initiated by the leader of SIAN, Arne Tumyr, after the former chair woman of the NHA board publicly had characterised a letter to the editor from Tumyr as "racist". Ingunn Økland of Aftenposten has criticised the use both by SIAN and its opponents of labelling each other "Nazi" in the Islam debate.

On the other hand, Iraqi refugee and writer Walid al-Kubaisi has made appearances in the organisation, and in the feature story "Norway for Norwegians" (Norge for nordmenn) in Klassekampen in 2005 stated that "the forum showed a variation of thoughts and opinions within the frame of fear of Islamism. The fear of Islamism is healthy and legitimate for the population of Europe, and in the Muslim world."

== See also ==
- Max Hermansen
