= Mona Walter =

Swedish activist and social commentator (born 1973)

- Born: 1973 (age 52–53); Mogadishu, Somalia
- Citizenship: Sweden
- Occupations: Activist, commentator

Mona Walter (born 1973) is a Swedish activist, critic of Islam and social commentator. She was born in Mogadishu, Somalia and moved to Sweden as a refugee in 1994.

== Biography ==
Walter being interviewed about Islam and Sharia in 2016

Raised Muslim, Walter renounced Islam and became an atheist. She later became a Christian and published writings critical of Islam via her social media accounts and in press articles. She has lived with death threats since converting in 2006. Her opinions on the threat she believes Islam poses to the Western world have caused controversy. Her analyses of Islam have been labeled as "anti-Muslim, Islamophobic, or racist in nature" by both Muslim and non-Muslim critics. In August 2015, Walter and a camera team from SVT news programme Aktuellt were attacked when they walked through the Stockholm district of Rinkeby. Eggs were thrown at the broadcaster's car.

She has voiced her support for the Eurabia theory, saying that she has heard imams talk about Islamising Sweden through child-births and immigration, and she has held speeches for organisations such as For Frihed (formerly Pegida Denmark), Stop Islamisation of Norway, and events with connections to the Sweden Democrats.

== See also ==
- Ayaan Hirsi Ali
