= Max Hermansen =

- Born: Max Jarl Hermansen; 30 May 1960 (age 65)
- Occupation: Activist
- Known for: Founder of Pegida Norway

Max Jarl Hermansen (born 30 May 1960) is a Norwegian anti-Muslim activist, former schoolteacher and military officer. He has written books about military history, and became known in 2015 as the founder and leader of Pegida Norway.

== Background ==
Hermansen grew up as a military brat in Northern Norway. He later became a naval military officer in the Royal Norwegian Navy himself, retiring at the rank of orlogskaptein, equivalent to lieutenant commander, in the Norwegian High Command, and also received hovedfag, equivalent to master's degree, in history.

He was the publisher of the naval military publishing company Sjømilitære Samfund from 2008, until he was forced to resign in 2013 due to his vocal opposition to the Norwegian monarchy, which included calling King Harald V a "doofus" for awarding the King's Medal of Merit to controversial Muslim convert Trond Ali Linstad—the award was eventually withdrawn. He was also a teacher at Sogn Upper Secondary School, and was then described as "Norway's most active republican", while being active in the organisation 'Norway as Republic!' In 2014 he became teacher in social studies at Kuben Upper Secondary School and Etterstad Upper Secondary School, but was replaced after a short time following complaints from students due to his views on Islam.

== Political activism ==
In January 2015, Hermansen gained much media attention for leading a march of 200 people in Oslo against Muslim immigration, inspired by the German Pegida movement. Later the same month, it was announced that he was no longer wanted at his part-time job as teacher at the Oslo Training Office for Service and Transport, due to his "statements and views on Islam". He resigned his position as teacher in early 2016 after a deal with the Oslo education agency, with a final agreement of 1.2 million kr while being banned from applying to teacher positions for five years. Hermansen also ran a used bookstore in Grünerløkka, which he closed in February 2015 after it was vandalised with graffiti.

Hermansen was formerly active in the minor Democrats political party, and was its top candidate for the parliamentary election in Oslo in 2017, after previously announcing that he wanted to become leader of the party. He was however expelled from the party in 2019, after new statutes disallowed members who were also active in far-right activist organisations. After Pegida failed to take lasting hold in Norway, with rapidly decreasing numbers of participants despite numerous demonstrations, he has later been active in Stop Islamisation of Norway.

== Bibliography ==
- D-dagen 1944 – og norsk innsats. Skorpionen. 2004. ISBN 9788299704908.
- Hardt styrbord – glimt fra norsk sjøkrigshistorie. Sjømilitære Samfund. 2008. ISBN 9788299770309.
- Da Marinen fikk Sanitet - sanitetsinspektøren i Sjøforsvaret 1994-2003. Sjømilitære Samfund. 2012. ISBN 9788299770330.
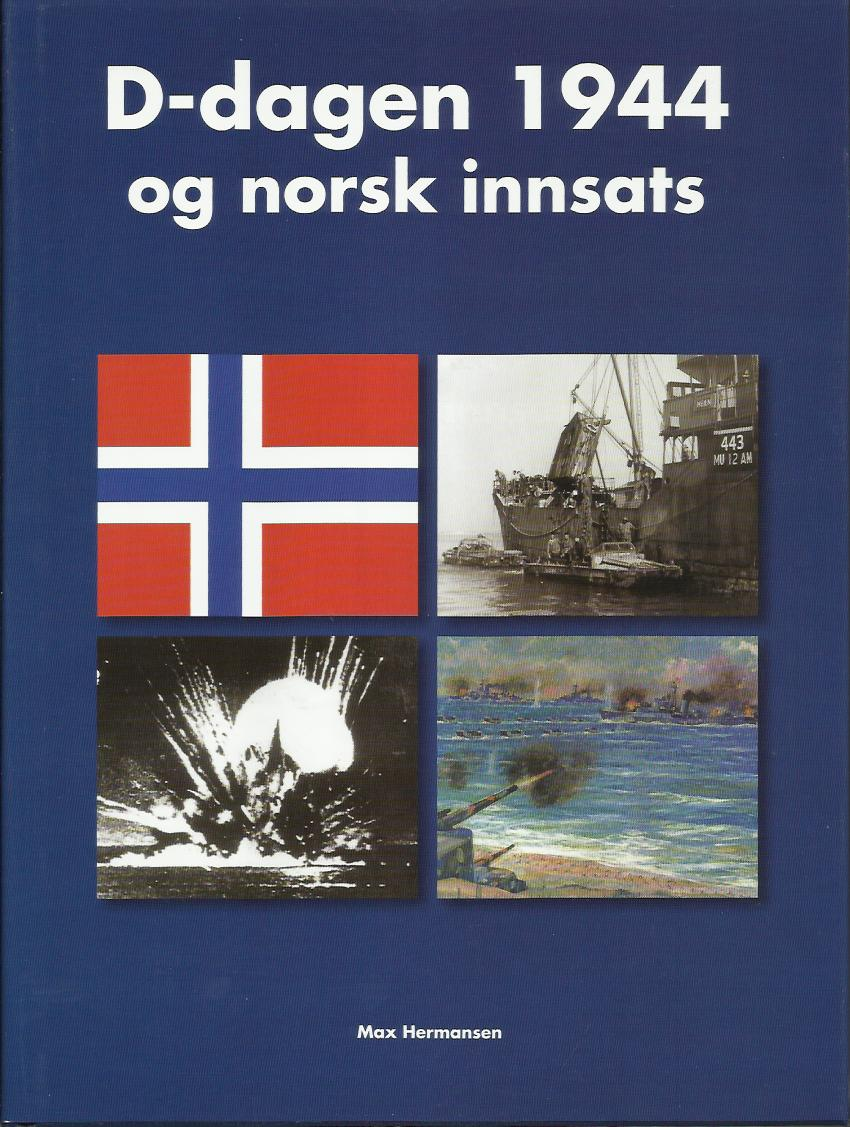
D-dagen 1944 – og norsk innsats, 2004

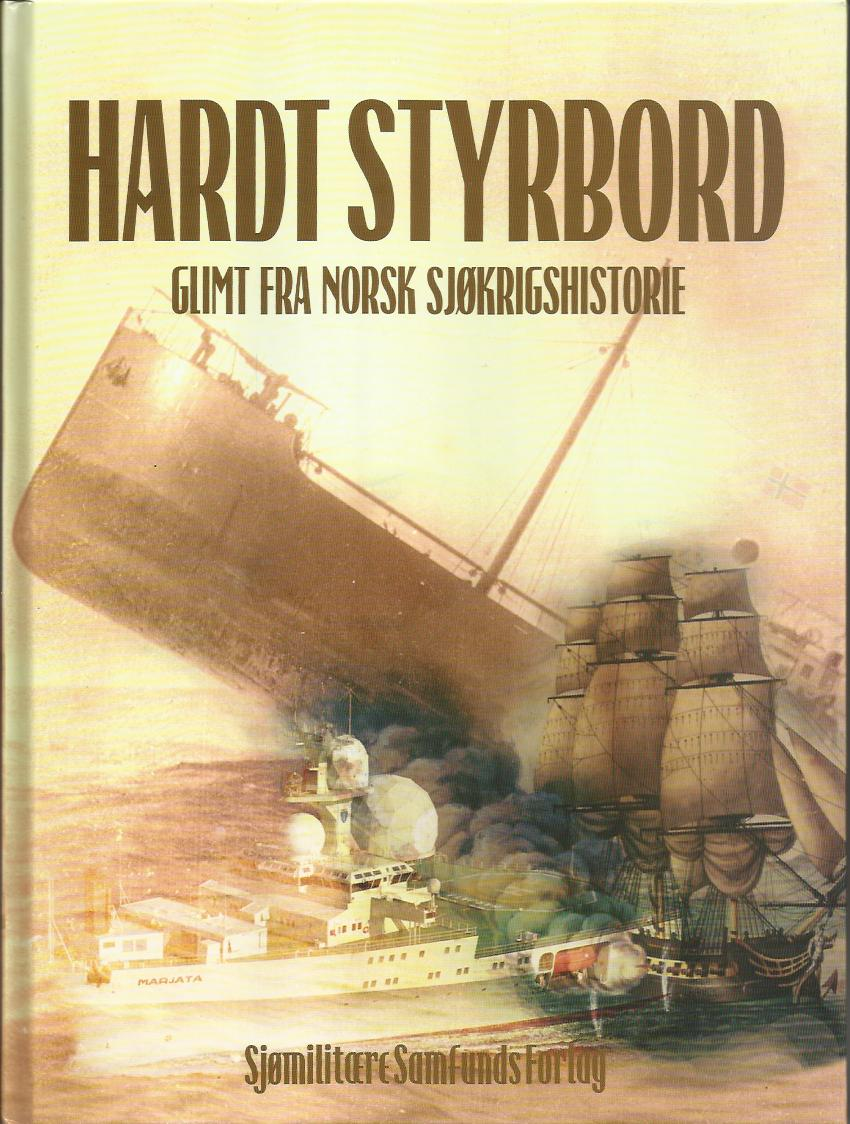
Hardt Styrbord – glimt fra norsk sjøkrigshistorie, 2008

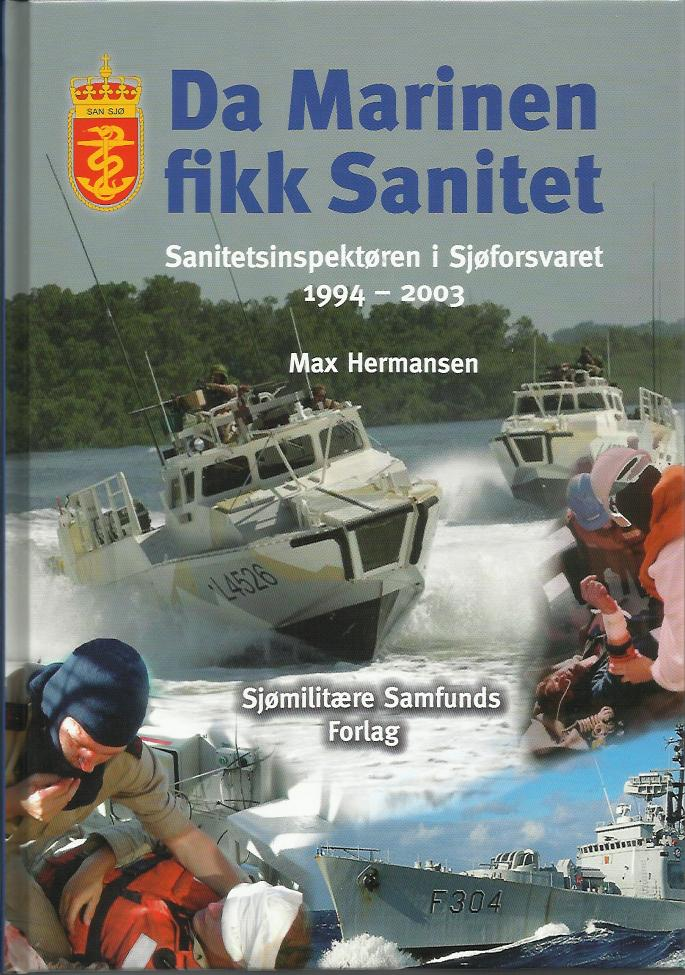
Da Marinen fikk Sanitet - sanitetsinspektøren i Sjøforsvaret 1994-2003, 2012
