= Christian Unity Party =

Christian Unity Party Kristent Samlingsparti
- Leader: Morten Selven
- Founded: 26 September 1998
- Dissolved: 10 January 2015
- Merger of: New Future Coalition Party; Christian Conservative Party
- Merged into: The Christians
- Ideology: Christian conservatism Christian fundamentalism
- Political position: Right-wing to far-right
- Colours: Blue

Website
- www.kristentsamlingsparti.no

The Christian Unity Party (Norwegian: Kristent Samlingsparti, KSP) was a Christian conservative and fundamentalist political party in Norway without parliamentary representation. The party's ideology is based on literal interpretation of the Bible, traditional values, and opposition to reforms in the Church of Norway.

== History and ideology ==
The Christian Unity Party was founded on 26 September 1998 with the merging of the New Future Coalition Party and the Christian Conservative Party. The party won a single representative in the municipal council of Kautokeino Municipality in the 1999 local elections.

The party's first years were marked by internal strife, mainly due to conflict over whether women should be allowed to hold posts in the party. Party leader Ivar Kristianslund was against women holding posts, but gained little support for this position and founded a fundamentalist splinter party after a court ruled in 2001 that Ørnulf Nandrup was the legitimate new leader of the party. During Kristianslund's leadership the party's ideology maintained that the Constitution of Norway was a gift from God to the Norwegian nation, stressed the divine right of the King of Norway, and wanted to abolish parliamentarism and restore Norway's original political system as of 1814. The party had around 1,000 members before the split.

After this the party has said that its ideology is very different from what it was in its early days, but the party still maintains strongly conservative Christian policies, holding the Bible as the highest authority of society. The party focuses on moral Christian values such as the traditional family and protection of the weak, and the party opposes abortion, same-sex marriage and immigration, especially from Islamic countries. The party supports economic liberalism, which it believes is most in accordance with the Bible. In foreign policy it is opposed to Norway joining the European Union, wants Norway to withdraw from the European Economic Area and the Schengen Agreement, and instead maintains strong support for the United States, NATO and Israel.

In the 2009 election campaign, pastor Jan-Aage Torp, the top candidate for Oslo, produced a graphic anti-abortion video that was shown three nights in a row on TV 2 evening news, due to its controversial nature. The party has also received attention as segments of the party have appeared as members of radical anti-Islam groups.

Ahead of the 2015 local elections the party announced that it would suspend all its activities after agreeing to cooperate with The Christians Party following 67% of its members voting to join the larger party.

== Elections ==
=== Parliamentary election results ===
| Year | # of overall votes | % of overall vote | # of overall seats won | +/– |
|---|---|---|---|---|
| 2001 | 6,742 | 0.3 | 0 / 169 | 0 |
| 2005 | 3,911 | 0.1 | 0 / 169 | 0 |
| 2009 | 4,936 | 0.2 | 0 / 169 | 0 |
| 2013 | 1,722 | 0.1 | 0 / 169 | 0 |

== Party leaders ==
- Ivar Kristianslund (1998–2001)
- Ørnulf Nandrup (2001–2010) The Christian Leaders
- Morten Selven (2010–2015)
