= New Future Coalition Party =

New Future Coalition Party Samlingspartiet Ny Fremtid
- Leader: Ivar Kristianslund
- Founded: Early 1993
- Dissolved: 26 September 1998
- Split from: Progress Party
- Succeeded by: Christian Unity Party
- Ideology: Christian conservatism
- Political position: Right-wing

The New Future Coalition Party (Norwegian: Samlingspartiet Ny Fremtid, SNF) was a Norwegian political party, which was founded by Member of Parliament Finn Thoresen in 1993. The party was never successful in elections, and merged with the Christian Conservative Party to form the Christian Unity Party in 1998.

== History ==
The party was founded in early 1993 by Member of Parliament Finn Thoresen, after he had defected from the Progress Party in late 1992. It put up lists in all counties of Norway in the election of the same year and received around 8,000 votes, far away from parliamentary representation by any county. The Christian Unity Party (Det Kristne Samlingsparti) merged into the party in 1994. In the election of 1997, the party was reduced to setting up lists in only two counties.

On 26 September 1998, the party merged with the Christian Conservative Party to form a new party, similarly as the earlier party called the Christian Unity Party (Kristent Samlingsparti).

== Political profile ==
The party sought a stronger presence for the Christian cultural foundation in politics.

== Party leaders ==
- Finn Thoresen (1993–1998)
- Ivar Kristianslund (1998)
