= Abortion Opponents' List =

Norwegian political party

The Abortion Opponents' List (Norwegian: Abortmotstandernes Liste) is a Norwegian political party led by priests Ludvig Nessa and Børre Knudsen, that was present in seven counties in the 2005 elections. In the 2009 elections, they only put up a list in one county, Østfold.

The party drew criticism when they declared they would not have any women in their list, reportedly to "spare them from mockery and hate in the media", while women could help with "practical [work]". The party received 1,934 votes, amounting to 0.07% of the votes cast, in the 2005 elections.

== Political profile ==
The party's main declared objective is to make abortion illegal. A flyer for the 2009 election, however, also contained the slogans, "Abortion is murder, evolution is superstition, homosexuality is an abomination, feminism is a rebellion against God, Islam is a lie, Jesus Christ is the way, the truth, and the life!"

== Campaigning methods ==
During their 2005 electoral campaign, the Abortion Opponents used methods that were criticized by the media, such as delivering plastic fetuses, along with electoral propaganda, and distributing DVDs depicting detailed and uncensored abortions to minors. Apparently, Nessa imported these techniques into Norway from American anti-abortion activist Gregg Cunningham.

== Elections ==
=== Parliamentary election results ===
Year	# of overall votes	% of overall vote	# of overall seats won	+/–
2005	1,934	0.1	0 / 169	▲0
2009	178	0.0	0 / 169	▼0
