= Deanery of Strandebarm =

Norwegian Lutheran denomination

"Church of Norway in Exile"
- Classification: Protestant
- Orientation: Lutheranism
- Region: Norway
- Origin: 1991 (Note: The "exile church" priests and their followers remained members of the Church of Norway until 2016, when Ludvig Nessa and Per Kørner officially rescinded their memberships.)
- Separated from: Church of Norway (claimed exile)
- Separations: Evangelical Lutheran Diocese of Norway (2013)
- Congregations: 12 (in 2001)

The Deanery of Strandebarm (Norwegian: Strandebarm Prosti), also known as the "Church of Norway in Exile" (Norwegian: «Den norske kirke i eksil»), was originally an independent conservative Lutheran deanery in Norway established in 1991 by priests who broke ties with the state church, the Church of Norway; in 1997 they claimed the status of a diocese. It functioned as a network of priests and congregations led by anti-abortion activists Børre Knudsen, Per Kørner and Ludvig Nessa who rejected what they claimed was the liberal direction of the Church of Norway. In 2012/13 the group split into the Evangelical Lutheran Diocese of Norway and independent "exile church" elect-congregations.

== History ==
The Deanery of Strandebarm (named after the parish and village Strandebarm) was established on Easter Sunday 1991 by priests Børre Knudsen, Ludvig Nessa and Per Kørner. They ordained Kørner, the priest in Strandebarm as dean. The three led the deanery after that, with Knudsen having a particular responsibility for Northern Norway, and Nessa and Kørner for the southern parts of the country. In 1997 priests Arne Thorsen and Olav Berg Lyngmo joined the deanery, and Kørner ordained Knudsen bishop of the "Church of Norway in Exile".

The deanery considered itself as a branch within the Church of Norway that had abandoned the supervision of the Government, the Norwegian Parliament, the Church Meeting, and the Church's officially appointed bishops. It opposed several of the Church's points of view, most importantly on abortion, homosexuality, and remarriage after a divorce without legitimate reasons. The deanery neither recognised female priests. It supported a complete division of the Church and the Government. The deanery consisted of around ten congregations spread across Norway.

Børre Knudsen retired as bishop due to failing health in 2008. In 2012 priest Thor Henrik With was ordained as new bishop for three elect-congregations in Northern Norway, later also for a congregation in Trondheim. Kørner and Nessa did not accept With as bishop as they considered his new leadership to represent a softening position on abortion, and continued to lead their own "exile church" elect-congregations in Western and Eastern Norway. The congregations led by With reconstituted themselves as the Evangelical Lutheran Diocese of Norway in 2013 and became aligned with the Swedish Mission Province.

Since 2014, church services administered by Ludvig Nessa has been broadcast on the Christian television channel Visjon Norge.

There was another split in the "exile church" in 2016, after Nessa and Kørner officially rescinded their memberships in the Church of Norway after it voted to allow same-sex marriage, while others including priest Einar Stjernholm Bryn and his followers remained members of the Church of Norway and disassociated themselves from the "exile church".
