= Karima Kamal =

Egyptian journalist

- Born: 1949 (age 76–77)
- Citizenship: Egypt
- Education: Cairo University
- Occupation: Journalist

Karima Kamal (Arabic: كريمة كمال; born 1949), also spelled Karimah, is an Egyptian journalist, author, and activist. She is a prominent feminist voice in the country's Coptic Christian minority.

== Biography ==
Karima Kamal was born in 1949 into a Coptic family. She studied journalism at Cairo University, graduating in 1971. She later pursued graduate studies at the University of Chicago, an experience she would recall in her 1983 memoir Bint Misriyya fi Amreeka ("An Egyptian Girl in America").

Kamal was a longtime columnist and editorial consultant at the privately owned newspaper Al-Masry Al-Youm. She also served as deputy editor in chief of Sabah al-Kheir magazine. She is now retired.

In addition to her 1983 memoir, Kamal has published several other nonfiction books, notably Divorce Among Copts (2006) and Copts' Personal Status Law (2012).

Kamal is considered a feminist activist within the Egyptian Coptic community, criticizing efforts to limit Copts' ability to divorce and remarry. She served on interim President Adly Mansour's Supreme Press Council, and she previously served on the country's National Council for Women.

In 2017, Kamal received an Editorial Leadership Award from Women in News, part of the World Association of Newspapers and News Publishers, at a summit in Durban, South Africa.
