= Siri Sunde =

Norwegian priest

- Born: 15 May 1958 (age 67)
- Occupation: Priest
- Employer: Church of Norway

Siri Sunde (born 15 May 1958) is a Norwegian priest. She was the first open lesbian priest who entered into a registered partnership and retained her position in the Church of Norway.
