= 2009 Norwegian parliamentary election =

- 13 and 14 September 2009

All 169 seats in the Storting 85 seats needed for a majority
- Registered: 3,530,785
- Turnout: 76.37% (▼1.06 pp)
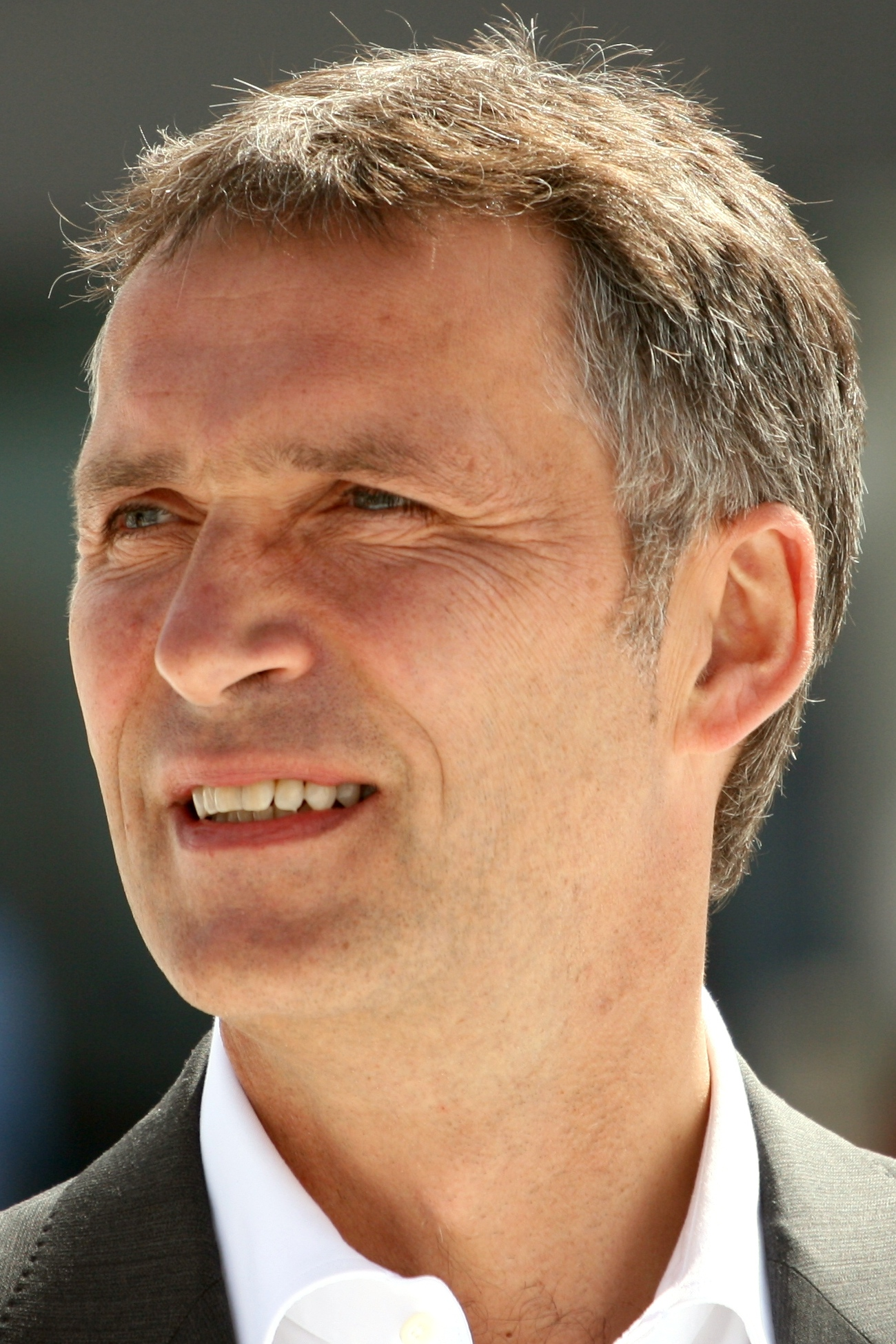

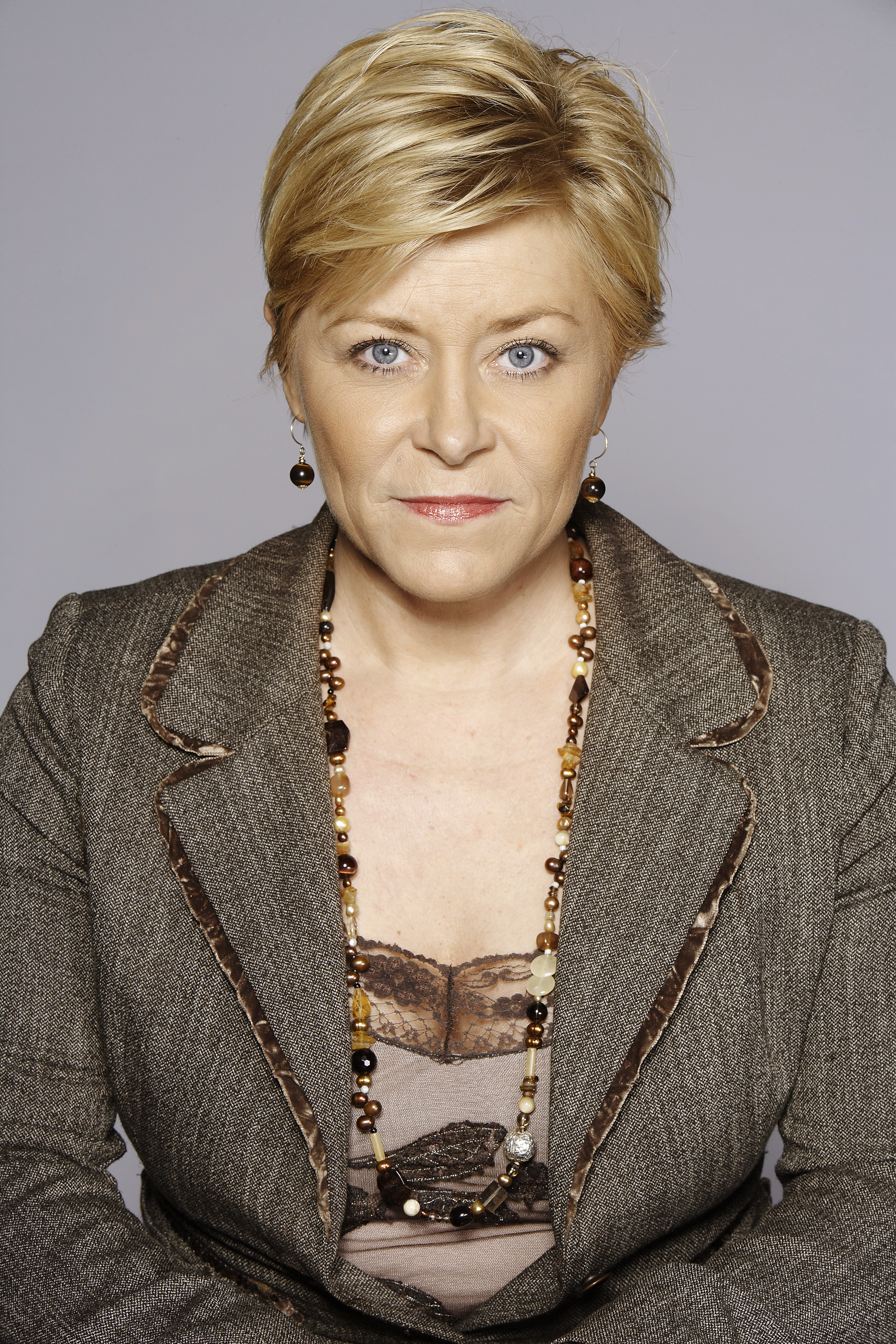

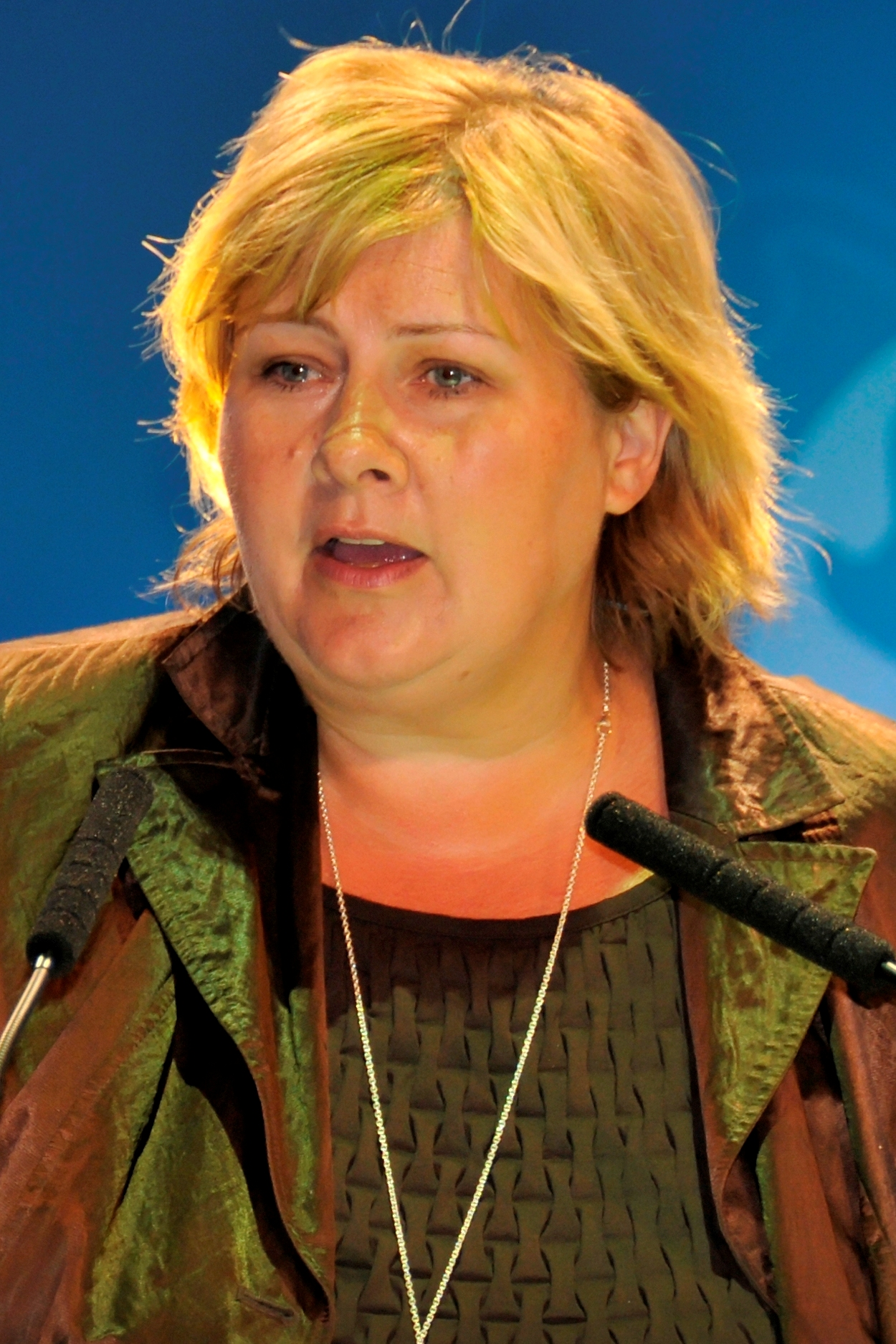

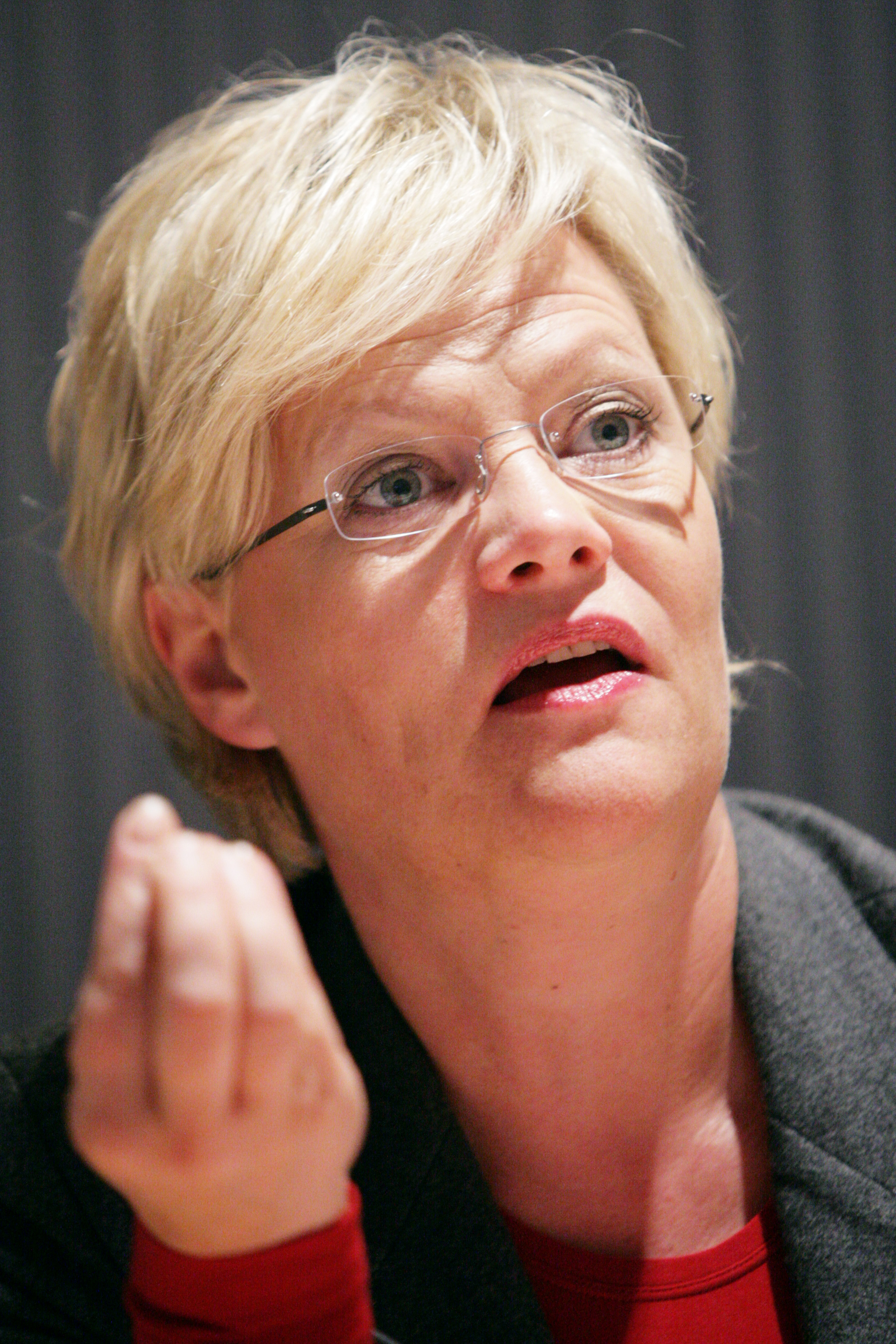

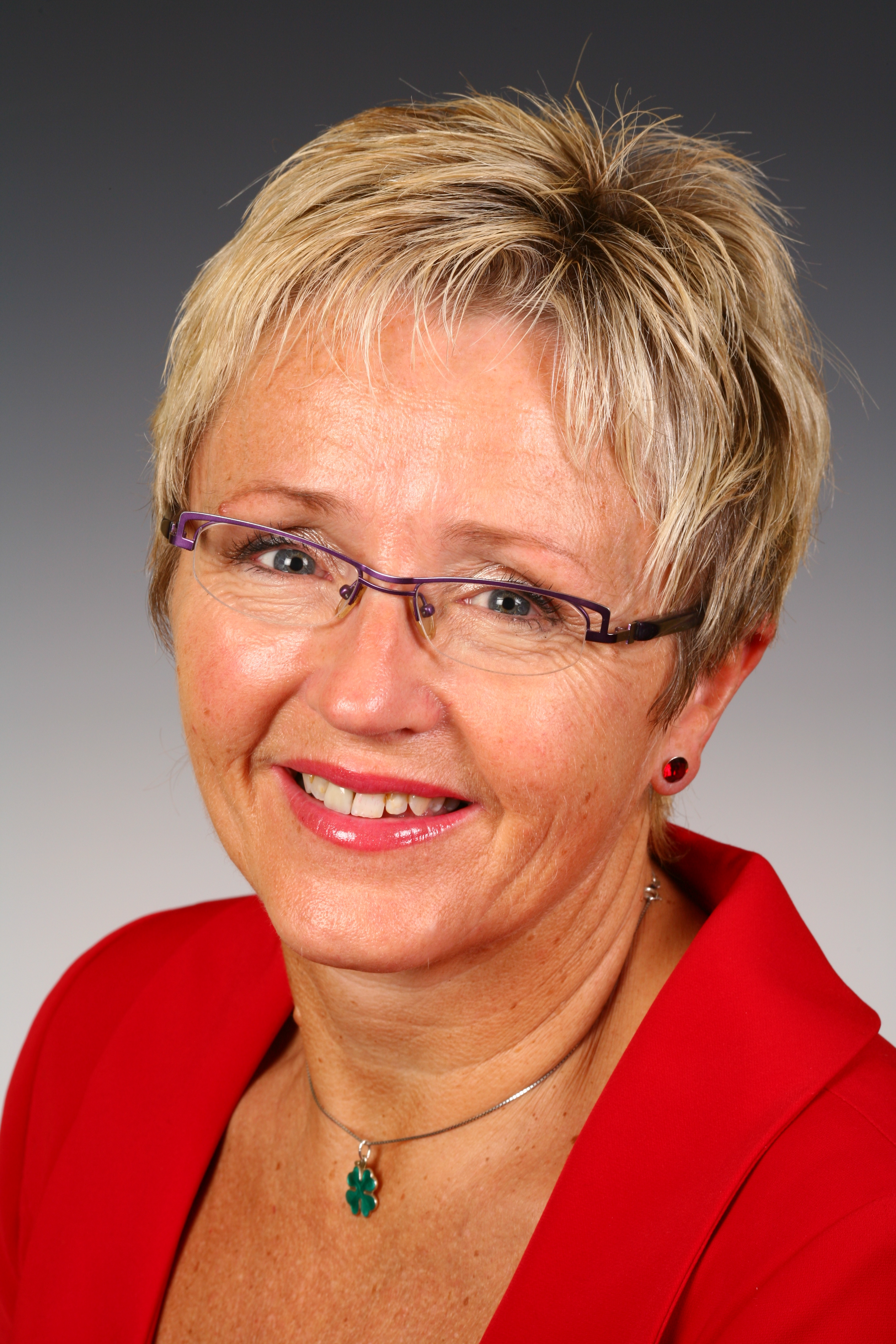

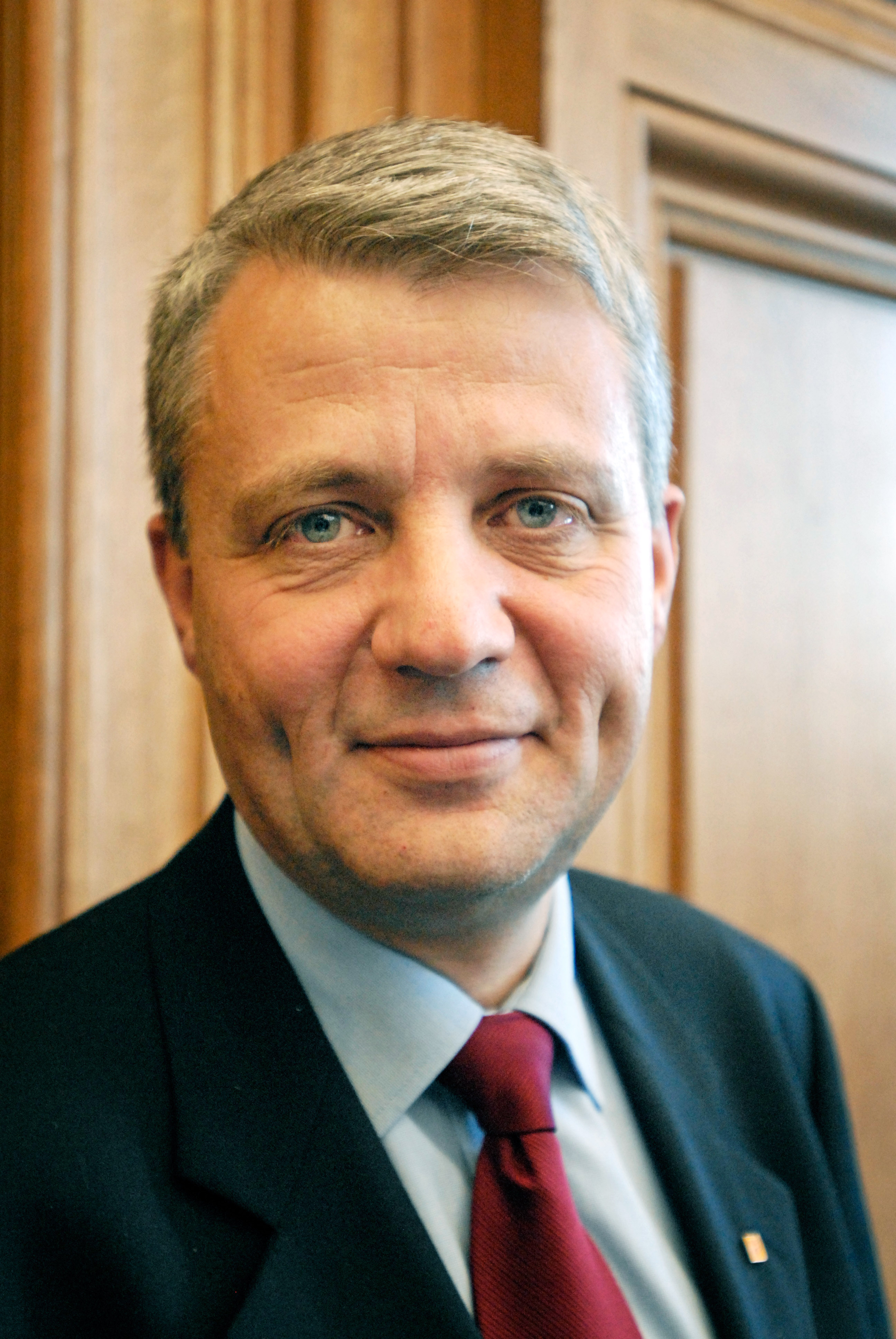

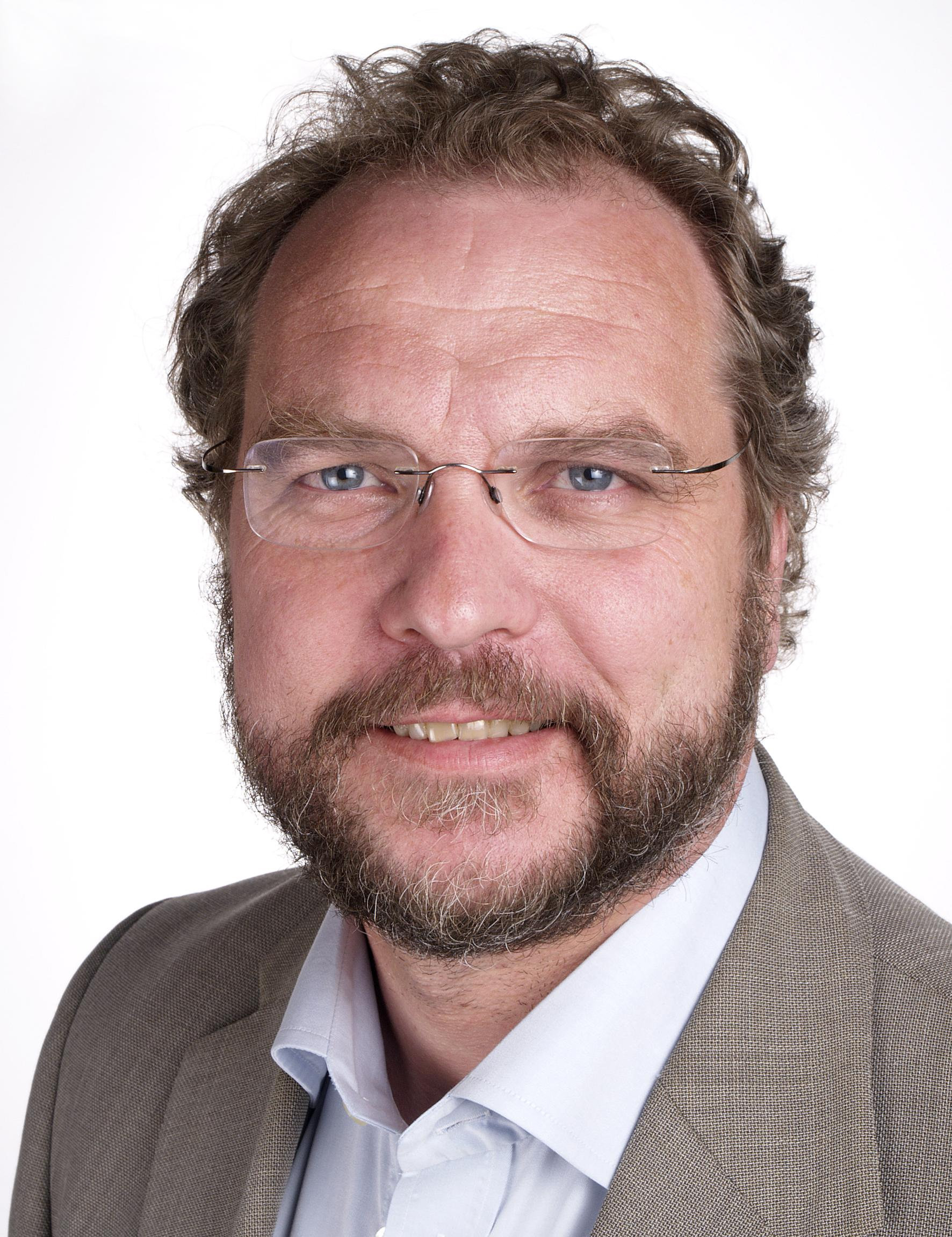
	First party	Second party	Third party
Leader	Jens Stoltenberg	Siv Jensen	Erna Solberg
Party	Labour	Progress	Conservative
Last election	32.69%, 61 seats	22.06%, 38 seats	14.10%, 23 seats
Seats won	64	41	30
Seat change	▲3	▲3	▲7
Popular vote	949,060	614,724	462,465
Percentage	35.37%	22.91%	17.23%
Swing	▲2.68 pp	▲0.85 pp	▲3.13 pp
	Fourth party	Fifth party	Sixth party
Leader	Kristin Halvorsen	Liv Signe Navarsete	Dagfinn Høybråten
Party	Socialist Left	Centre	Christian Democratic
Last election	8.83%, 15 seats	6.48%, 11 seats	6.78%, 11 seats
Seats won	11	11	10
Seat change	▼4	Steady	▼1
Popular vote	166,366	165,014	148,750
Percentage	6.20%	6.15%	5.54%
Swing	▼2.63 pp	▼0.33 pp	▼1.24 pp
	Seventh party
Leader	Lars Sponheim
Party	Liberal
Last election	5.92%, 10 seats
Seats won	2
Seat change	▼8
Popular vote	104,144
Percentage	3.88%
Swing	▼2.04 pp
- Largest bloc and seats won by constituency
Prime Minister before election
Jens Stoltenberg
Labour
Prime Minister after election
Jens Stoltenberg
Labour

Parliamentary elections were held in Norway on 13 and 14 September 2009. Elections in Norway are held on a Monday in September, usually the second or third Monday, as determined by the king. Early voting was possible between 10 August and 11 September 2009, while some municipalities also held open voting on 13 September. Voters elected 169 members for the Storting, each for a four-year term. Voter turn-out in the 2009 general elections was 76.4%.

Candidates were elected on party lists in each of the 19 counties. The political parties nominated candidates for these lists during late 2008 and early 2009. The party lists had to be registered by 31 March 2009.

Although the opposition received more votes, the governing Red-Green Coalition obtained more seats in parliament. This allowed Jens Stoltenberg to continue as prime minister. Further to the right, both the Conservative Party and Progress Party increased their number of seats in parliament. The centrist Liberal Party failed to cross the electoral threshold of 4%, and were reduced to two representatives in Parliament.

== Electoral system ==
There are 169 seats in the Norwegian Parliament, but voters directly elect only 150 as constituency representatives, while the remaining 19 are "at-large" members—one for each county—and these are apportioned to parties based on the total national vote.

For the purposes of parliamentary elections, Norway is divided into 19 constituencies corresponding to the counties, including the municipal authority of Oslo, which is a county of its own. The number of members to be returned from each constituency varies from 3 to 16, according to the population and area of the county. Norway has capped the number of "fixed" seats at 150 and, to determine how to apportion those amongst the 19 counties, it uses a two-tier formula based on population and geographic size. Each inhabitant counts one point, while each square kilometer counts 1.8 points.

== Campaign ==
=== Labour ===
According to various opinion poll measurements, by late 2008 the Norwegian Labour Party was no longer the largest party in Norway. The Norstat poll for the Norwegian Broadcasting Corporation (NRK) showed the Progress Party at 30.6%, while the Labour Party had declined to 26%. By September 2008 Labour had increased to 29.5%, while the Progress Party decreased to 29.2%. By early September, an opinion poll by Synovate put the Labour Party at 33.8%, while the Progress Party had continued to decrease to 21.4%.

After announcing their plans to tighten national immigration policy, the Labour Party gained a further 2.5% in an opinion poll done by In Fact for Verdens Gang, while the Progress Party decreased by 1.8%. Two out of three Norwegians claimed that they agreed with the new "tightening" of the immigration policy. Later, in a controversial statement, Labour Party secretary Raymond Johansen said "Siv Jensen is the biggest threat to the Norwegian oil industry", claiming that the Progress Party's oil drilling policy in Lofoten would be a mistake.

Prime Minister and leader of the Labour Party Jens Stoltenberg stated that Labour would campaign for a renewed majority for the ruling Red-Green Coalition, consisting of Labour, the Socialist Left and the Centre Party. The consequences were less clear if the ruling coalition were to lose its majority—the coalition was unlikely to remain in power as a minority government. The Norwegian newspaper, Verdens Gang claimed in March 2008 that the Labour Party could form a minority government on its own if the ruling coalition should lose its parliamentary majority. The county mayor of Sør-Trøndelag, Tore O. Sandvik, was quoted as supporting this option. During a debate, however, Stoltenberg said that a non-socialist majority would yield a non-socialist government.

The Labour Party gathered 35.4% of the popular vote, which was an increase of 2.7% and resulted in three additional seats in parliament. This led to the continuation of the Red-Green Coalition government. After the election, a number of opposition leaders believed that the government would collapse because of the Labour Party constantly riding roughshod over their coalition partners. In an opinion poll in November, two months after the election, all parties continued to decrease, leading some to speculate that the coalition was "slipping".

=== Progress ===
The Progress Party's One Hundred Days Plan was officially announced in August, 2009 in Trondheim. It said that the party wanted to increase "freedom of choice in all public services", making businesses "the most competitive in Europe and restoring confidence in Norway". Per Sandberg, deputy leader of the Progress Party's Sør-Trøndelag chapter, blamed the One Hundred Days Plan and said; "The debate on our 100-day program laid out disappointingly fast. We can only lash ourselves to the all-time run".

Progress Party leader Siv Jensen stated that her party would not support a coalition government in which it did not participate, thus apparently ruling out a minority coalition of the Conservatives, the Liberals and the Christian Democrats, like the government of Kjell Magne Bondevik which was in office from 2001 to 2005. She also stated that the Progress Party would have been prepared to form a minority government alone if the party won more seats in parliament than the other three non-socialist parties.

In the months before the election, the party had, as in the 2001 election, received high poll results that steadily declined throughout the last weeks. In certain individual polls in late 2008, the party averaged around 30%, which at that point made it the most popular party in Norway, Hence the actual election result was relatively disappointing. During the election campaign in the four weeks before the election, the party dropped 3.5% in the poll. Most of these losses went to the Conservative Party, which had run a successful campaign. The Progress Party increased its share of the vote by 0.9%, a slight gain from the previous election and the best election result in the party's history.

=== Conservative ===
In the previous election, the Conservatives had their worst result since the Second World War, only obtaining 14.1% of the vote. According to various opinion polls, most notably by Norstat, they had several weak showings from May to July 2009, in what Verdens Gang described as the "summer nightmare". After this, In Fact, an opinion poll service, announced that the Conservatives had scored 15% in their poll.

In January, Conservative Party deputy leader Per-Kristian Foss said that the party would not sit in a government without Erna Solberg as prime minister and claimed that both the Christian Democrats and the Liberals agreed with this policy. On hearing of this, Christian Democrat Party leader Dagfinn Høybråten, said that it would be natural to clarify this when the voters had had their say, but "the negotiations don't start now". After seeing the Progress Party's One Hundred Day Plan, Erna Solberg said "So I conclude that the 100-day revolution is canceled", with the two centre parties distancing themselves more from the Progress Party.

Both the Christian Democrats and the Liberals openly supported a three-party coalition with Solberg as Prime Minister. A new Christian Democrat–Liberal–Conservative government would have avoided the need for support from the Progress Party, by leaving the draft budget from the Red-Green Coalition unchanged. This budget would then pass with support from the Red-Greens and the new non-socialist government. Further issues could then be postponed until 2010 and be handled individually. The Progress Party had promised to vote for measures with which they agree, and the Red-Green parties were expected to do the same. By the start of September, the Progress Party had lost 4.9% of its public support, and some believed that this was due to their One Hundred Day Plan. Meanwhile, the Conservative party gained 3.7%, a number of whom were former Progress Party supporters.

The Conservative Party obtained 17.2% of the vote (462,465 votes), an increase of 3.1%, earning 30 seats in parliament, 7 more than the previous election. After a "disastrous" election by the Liberal Party, its leader Lars Sponheim blamed Solberg for the bad results, accusing her of "tearing the party apart". Solberg responded with "He can't honestly believe that having political differences is to tear apart the Liberal Party".

=== Socialist Left ===
Facing a steady decrease in support since they joined the Red-Green Coalition, the Socialist Left Party faced the prospect of one of their worst elections since the 1980s. In the 2007 local elections, their result was halved from that of the previous local elections held in 2003. By May 2009, the Socialist Left was the only party in the Red-Green Coalition whose public support increased—they averaged about 11.1% in an opinion poll.

Following a severe downturn, the party improved by late August, averaging around 10% in various opinion polls. At the same time, support for the two other members of the Red-Green Coalition decreased. According to the national newspaper Dagbladet, Socialist Left's rise in popularity was due to the stands they took on environmental issues, the most important of which was oil drilling in Lofoten.

During the campaign, Socialist Left Party leader Kristin Halvorsen was the target of much criticism because, during the 2005 parliamentary election, she said "I will remove poverty with a stroke of a pen". Instead, poverty had increased nationwide during the coalition's four years in government. Jens Stoltenberg said "Kristin has been a driving force to combat poverty, especially among children. But we are not satisfied, and should do more".

On 12 September the party suffered another decrease in public support, averaging 7% according to various polls. On the same day, two days before election day, party leader Halvorsen started the "24 hours – 24 measures" campaign to build up public support before the election. The Norwegian newspaper Aftenposten said in one of its articles that Socialist Left was involved in an "election massacre", saying there was little hope of increasing public support in the last two days.

On election night, the party lost four seats and were left with eleven, but a three-seat gain by the Labor Party secured the Red-Green coalition a majority in Parliament. The shift of power within the coalition resulted in Socialist Left losing one cabinet minister, leaving them with four, the same as the Centre Party. They ceded the influential Department of Finance to the Labour Party in order to keep control of the Department for Education and Research.

=== Centre ===
During the election, the Centre Party faced losing its core voters, the farmers, because Finance Minister Kristin Halvorsen wanted to introduce higher taxes on farming, which the farming community said would lead to high unemployment. Socialist Left MP Heikki Holmås said there was no proof of high taxation leading to more unemployment. In a later statement, Transport Minister Liv Signe Navarsete admitted that she had not "been able to reduce the income gap between farmers and other income groups", saying it would be an issue she would discuss with the Labour and Socialist Left parties.

When the results were announced, the party received a 6.2% share (165,014 votes), a decline from 6.5%. This entitled them to as many Cabinet members as the Socialist Left, whose share of the vote had fallen from 8.8% to 6.2%.

=== Christian Democratic ===
According to election analysts, the Christian Democratic Party was able to win more votes because of its strong opposition to the Marriage Act of 2008, which gave gay people the right to marry. They believed that same-sex marriage would damage children's upbringing, and party leader Dagfinn Høybråten claimed that marriage is primarily for a man and a woman.

During the national convention, Høybråten made a speech attacking the Red-Green Coalition. His most important message was an attack on the market economy and consumer thinking in Norway. In a later statement, Høybråten said "I challenge those on the Right who have conservative values, those who are not so concerned about dollars, cents and calculators". He later admitted it would be hard to work with the Conservatives if they won the election.

A major problem facing the party was that it lost right-leaning Christian voters to the Progress Party. A number of these voters believed that the party would not be able to defend "Christian traditions" in Norway, because of its strong opposition to a government run by the Progress party. Another problem facing the party was that it was unable to refresh its image among voters.

Høybråten stated that his party would not be part of a coalition with the Progress Party, but had not ruled out supporting such a government. The Christian Democrats' preference for a coalition was with the Liberals and the Conservatives. In total, the Christian Democrats were able to gather 5.5% of the vote, a decrease from the 6.7% achieved in the 2005 election. After the announcement of their results, Deputy Leader Inger Lise Hansen sparked unrest within the party. She felt that it had become too "narrow" and wanted it to return to the "generous and popular image" it enjoyed during the 1990s. Another faction within the party wanted Høybråten to resign as party leader.

=== Liberal ===
The leader of the Liberal Party, Lars Sponheim, stated in September 2007 that his party would neither be a part of nor support a coalition that included the Progress Party, and that the Liberal Party preferred Labour Prime Minister Jens Stoltenberg over Progress Party leader Siv Jensen. By late August, 2009 figures produced by Response suggested that only 2% within the Liberal Party wanted to collaborate with the Progress Party. Sponheim later distanced himself and his party from the Conservative Party because the Conservatives wanted to improve relations with the Progress Party, leading Sponheim to comment "A vote for the Conservatives is a vote for the Progress Party". He said that the Liberal Party was the only solid choice on the right that didn't want to be involved in a government with the Progress Party.

During a national broadcast debate on TV2, Sponheim said that, if the Progress Party won the minority government position, he would propose a motion of no confidence in the new cabinet. If that did not work, the Liberal Party would support a minority government led by Stoltenberg and the Labour Party. The Norwegian media criticised Sponheim for being vague and unclear when it came to the Progress Party, and the Red-Green Coalition were unsure of what side he was actually on.

In early September, election researcher Frank Aarebot predicted a catastrophic election for the Liberal Party. The main reason for his prediction was Sponheim's policy of merging small municipalities into larger and more efficient ones. Centre Party leader Liv Signe Navarsete called this proposal undemocratic and said that forced mergers would only make matters worse.

On the evening of 14 September 2009, Lars Sponheim announced that he would step down as party leader, as a consequence of the results his party achieved. The Liberal Party finished below the 4% threshold for leveling seats, leaving the party with only two seats in parliament, whereas they had ten seats before the election. Sponheim, who lost his own seat in Hordaland, later blamed the Conservative Party for the bad results that hit the Liberal Party and centre politics in Norway. Later still he revealed that he and Stoltenberg were planning to include the Liberal Party in the ruling coalition. Liberal Deputy Leader Ola Elvestuen was negative towards the idea, saying that the only option for a coalition was with the Christian Democrats and the Conservatives.

=== Red ===
The Red Party was established by a merger of the Red Electoral Alliance and the Workers' Communist Party in 2007. Torstein Dahle, the leader of the Red Electoral Alliance, was elected party leader. In the 2007 county election, Red received 1.9% of the vote, increasing its share by 1.6%. In an opinion poll conducted by TNS Gallup for TV2 in late August 2009, the party received 2.7% of the popular vote, an increase of 0.7%. Such a result in the election would mean that the party would have two parliamentary representatives, one from Oslo and one from Hordaland. In total, 12 opinion polls claimed that Red would win two seats in parliament. On seeing these poll results, Dahle said he would support the Red-Green Coalition, acknowledging that he couldn't topple the closest thing to socialism to the right of Red. On 11 September, three days before election day, Jens Stoltenberg told the media that he didn't want the Red-Green Coalition to become dependent on Red in Parliament. Earlier, Ola Borten Moe from the Centre Party told Klassekampen that neither he nor his party would collaborate or affiliate themselves with Red.

Red was accused of electoral fraud in late September, after a member had replaced Conservative Party tickets with Red tickets in the voting booths at Bønes Skole in Bergen. Trond R. Hole, a Conservative Party official, said he was "shocked", but assumed it was an individual and not the party that had committed the fraud. Dahle told the media that he, and the party, were strongly opposed to such a heinous crime. Later, the Conservative Party accused Red of another election fraud, this time in Oslo, but this time they had no proof to back up their claims.

On election day, an opinion poll conducted by Dagens Næringsliv predicted 1.9% of the vote for Red. It actually obtained 1.3% (36,219 votes), making it the largest party outside Parliament. 12,000 of those votes came from Oslo. In the municipality of Hordaland, Red garnered 2.5% of the vote, a decrease of 0.9% from the 2005 election. Red increased its voter share in Troms, in Nordland and in Telemark. Dahle acknowledged to the media that neither he nor his party were pleased by the results. He remained optimistic, however, calling the results a "good starting point".

=== Slogans ===
Party	Original slogan	English translation
Labour Party	«Alle skal med»	«Everyone must join»
Progress Party	«Frp fornyer Norge»	«FrP (Note: Progress Party) renews Norway»
Conservative Party	«Trygghet og optimisme»	«Safety and optimism»
Socialist Left Party	«Ulike mennesker. Like muligheter»	«Different people. Same opportunities»
Christian Democratic Party	«Livskvalitet i hverdagen»	«Life quality in the daily life»
Centre Party	«Med hjerte for hele landet»	«With heart for the whole country»
Liberal Party	«Vi vil prioritere miljø, kunnskap og velferd»	«We will prioritize the environment, knowledge and welfare»
Red Electoral Alliance	«Vi skal farge Norge rødt»	«We shall colour Norway red»

== Opinion polls ==
By early 2008, the Norwegian media were already speculating about possible outcomes of the election, and politicians were making statements about their preferred coalition partners. No single party has had a majority in the Norwegian parliament since 1961, and the largest party in the previous election won only 61 of the 169 seats. The overwhelming likelihood was therefore that the election would lead to the formation of a majority or minority coalition government; the Norwegian Labour Party was the only one likely to be able to form a single-party minority government.

Liberal Party leader Lars Sponheim said during a televised debate in early 2008 that the ruling Red-Green coalition government would face the same problems as Kjell Magne Bondevik's second coalition government. He added that the Red-Green coalition was losing its "faith in the continued majority. It does something to you and your desire for power". In an opinion poll in December 2008, 55% of the Norwegian people had most faith in the Red-Green Coalition government to lead Norway out of the financial crisis.

=== Exit polls ===
Three exit polls, from the Norwegian Broadcasting Corporation (NRK), TV2 and Verdens Gang, were released at 9 pm Norwegian time on the night of the election. Both NRK and TV2 predicted a slim majority for the ruling Red-Green Coalition over the opposition parties, while Verdens Gang showed a dead heat between the blocks, both having 84 seats in Parliament. Verdens Gang's poll showed the revolutionary socialist Red Party earning two parliamentary representatives, having already promised its support to the Red-Green Coalition before the election. Due to a manual error, the exit poll used by NRK significantly overestimated the support for the Socialist Left Party.

== Results ==

As in the 2005 elections, the Red-Green Coalition won the election with fewer votes (this time 47.9%) than the opposition parties (49.5%). Peter N. Myhre of the Progress Party complained that this meant eight years with a government that had not truly won an election, and called for an overhaul of an electoral system that, he claimed, disproportionately favours the Norwegian periphery. Hanne Marthe Narud, a political scientist at the University of Oslo, identified the result as a consequence of deliberate political planning, and in particular of a 2001 compromise in the Storting that balanced proportionality against an intent to over-represent rural areas. She explained to Dagbladet that this trend could be dated as far back as 1917, when it was argued that Oslo's status as the national capital inherently gave it greater influence, so that it should have less representation in parliament compared with rural areas. Electoral researcher Bernt Aardal stated that he had calculated the results of the election without the rural skewness. His results showed that the Labour Party and Progress Party would both lose a representative, while Red and the Liberal Party would each gain one, still giving a majority to the Red-Green Coalition.

Voter turnout was 76%.

Party	Votes	%	Seats	+/–
Labour Party	949,049	35.37	64	+3
Progress Party	614,717	22.91	41	+3
Conservative Party	462,458	17.24	30	+7
Socialist Left Party	166,361	6.20	11	−4
Centre Party	165,006	6.15	11	0
Christian Democratic Party	148,748	5.54	10	−1
Liberal Party	104,144	3.88	2	−8
Red Party	36,219	1.35	0	0
Pensioners' Party	11,900	0.44	0	0
Green Party	9,286	0.35	0	0
Coastal Party	5,341	0.20	0	0
Christian Unity Party	4,936	0.18	0	0
Democrats	2,285	0.09	0	0
Communist Party	697	0.03	0	0
Liberal People's Party	350	0.01	0	0
Contemporary Party	264	0.01	0	New
Center Alliance	241	0.01	0	New
Norwegian Patriots	183	0.01	0	New
Vigrid	179	0.01	0	New
Abortion Opponents' List	178	0.01	0	0
Society Party	140	0.01	0	0
One (Written) Language	103	0.00	0	New
Non-Partisan Deputies	64	0.00	0	New
Norwegian Republican Alliance	54	0.00	0	0
Total	2,682,903	100.00	169	0
Valid votes	2,682,903	99.49		
Invalid/blank votes	13,732	0.51		
Total votes	2,696,635	100.00		
Registered voters/turnout	3,530,785	76.37		
Source: Statistics Norway

=== Voter demographics ===
Cohort	Percentage of cohort voting for							
Cohort	Ap	FrP	H	Sv	Sp	KrF	V	Others
Total vote	35.37%	22.91%	17.23%	6.20%	6.15%	5.54%	3.88%	
Gender
Females	39.4%	16.5%	16.8%	8.2%	5.1%	6.3%	4.7%	
Males	31.8%	28.7%	17.6%	4.4%	7%	4.8%	3.3%	
Age
18–30 years old	31.1%	21.7%	13.2%	7.5%	6.6%	8.5%	3.8%	
30-59 years old	36.4%	21.2%	19%	7.3%	6.1%	4.4%	3.9%	
60 years old and older	35.6%	26.9%	15.6%	3.5%	6.2%	6.2%	3.7%	
Work
low income	39%	26.2%	7.9%	6.6%	4.5%	8.6%	4.1%	
Average income	34.1%	24.3%	14.9%	8%	7.7%	4.8%	2.7%	
High income	35.2%	20%	23%	5.6%	5.2%	4.9%	4.9%	
Education
Primary school	43.9%	34.1%	5.4%	2.4%	4.4%	3.9%	1.5%	
High school	34.4%	30.5%	14.7%	4.1%	6.7%	4.8%	3%	
University/college	33.4%	11.4%	23.8%	9.4%	6.2%	6.8%	5.7%	
Source: Norwegian Institute for Social Research

=== Seat distribution ===
Constituency	Total seats	Seats won								
Constituency	Total seats	By party							By coalition	
Constituency	Total seats	Ap	FrP	H	SV	Sp	KrF	V	Borgerlig	Red-green
Akershus	16	5	4	4	1		1	1	10	6
Aust-Agder	4	1	1	1			1		3	1
Buskerud	9	4	2	2		1			4	5
Finnmark	5	3	1	1					2	3
Hedmark	8	4	1	1	1	1			2	6
Hordaland	15	5	4	3	1	1	1		8	7
Møre og Romsdal	9	3	3	1		1	1		5	4
Nord-Trøndelag	6	3	1	1		1			2	4
Nordland	10	4	3	1	1	1			4	6
Oppland	7	3	1	1	1	1			2	5
Oslo	17	6	3	4	2		1	1	9	8
Østfold	9	4	3	1			1		5	4
Rogaland	13	3	4	3	1	1	1		8	5
Sogn og Fjordane	5	2	1	1		1			2	3
Sør-Trøndelag	10	4	2	1	1	1	1		4	6
Telemark	6	3	1	1			1		3	3
Troms	7	3	2	1		1			3	4
Vest-Agder	6	1	2	1	1		1		4	2
Vestfold	7	3	2	1	1				3	4
Total	169	64	41	30	11	11	10	2	83	86
Source: Storting

== See also ==
- 2009 Norwegian Sami parliamentary election
