= Mohammad Usman Rana =

Norwegian commentator

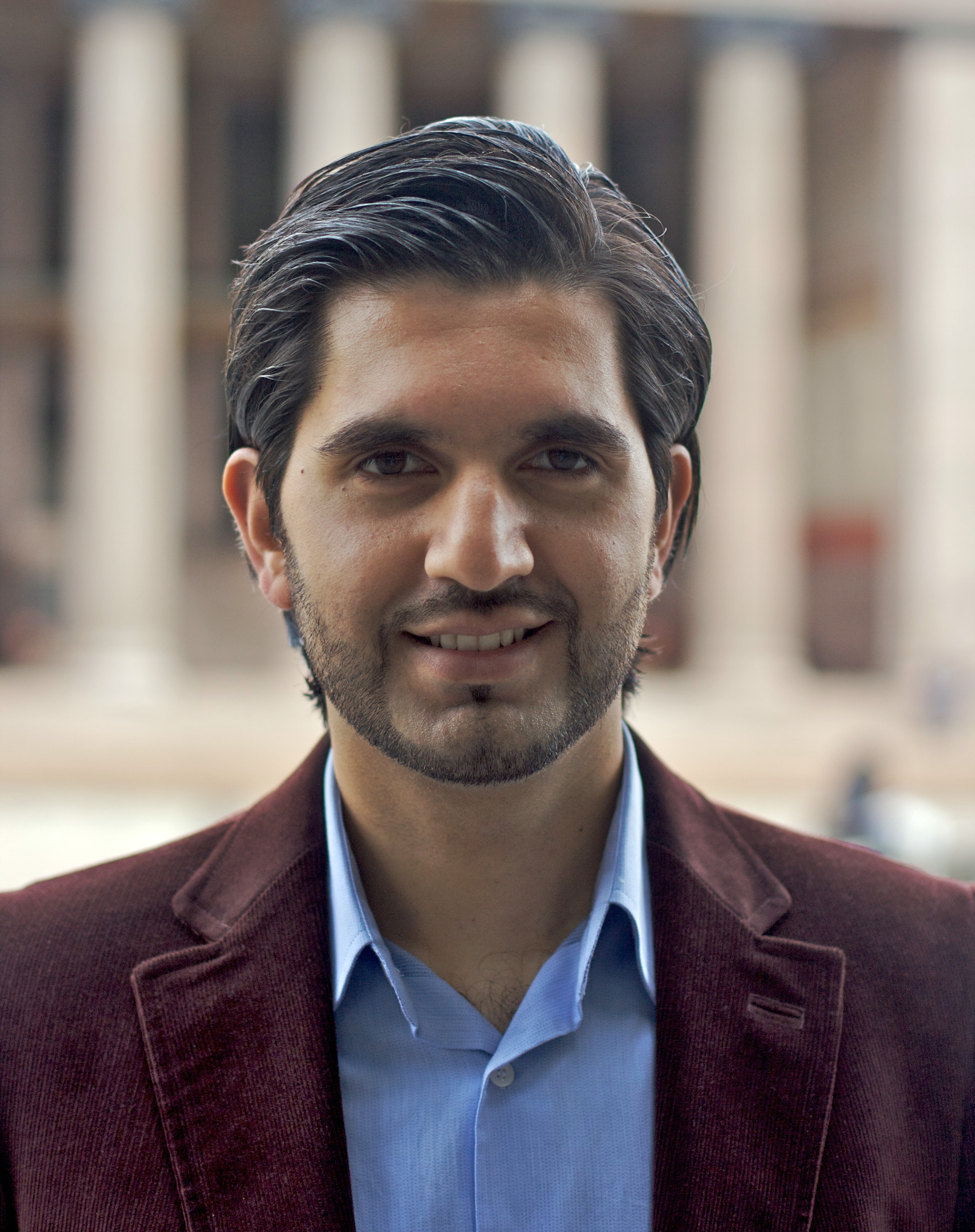
- Mohammad Usman Rana (2009)
- Born: June 3, 1985 (age 40); Norway
- Occupation(s): Commentator and Medical doctor

Mohammad Usman Rana (born 3 June 1985) is a Norwegian commentator, columnist and medical doctor, having earned his degree at the University of Oslo.

== Early life ==
He was born in Norway, and grew up in Husvik in southern Tønsberg. His father Aftab Ahmed Rana was a local politician for the Norwegian Labour Party, and a leader of an Islamic congregation (named "Islamsk Senter") in Vestfold.

== Career ==
Rana enrolled at the University of Oslo to attend medical school. In 2005 he became the leader of the Norwegian-Pakistani Students' Association (Norsk-pakistansk studentersamfunn). In 2007, Rana became the leader of the Muslim Students' Association at the University of Oslo. He is a columnist for Aftenposten – the largest newspaper in Norway – and is a commentator on Islam, extremism, and secularism.

Rana helped organize humanitarian aid to the victims of the 2005 Kashmir earthquake. He participated in debates on national television and was interviewed by newspapers on issues pertaining to immigration, integration, Islamism, internal strife in Norwegian Muslim groups.

=== Norwegian Islam ===
Rana emphasizes the importance of contextualization of Islam in Scandinavia and creating a Norwegian-Muslim identity, which is truthful to the Islamic texts and also to the Scandinavian context. Rana has written extensively on these topics. He is currently writing a book which is titled "The idea of Norwegian Islam". He recommends that future Norwegian imams must be trained at institutions in the West, he said in an interview with the Norwegian MorgenBladet: "It is tempting to believe that imams who are educated in the West will have greater understanding of what it means to be a Muslim in Western societies."

=== Essay contest victory ===
In early 2008, Rana won an essay contest initiated by the newspaper Aftenposten. The idea of the contest is to broadcast voices of young people in Norway. In his winning text, titled "The Secular Extremism" (Norwegian: Den sekulære ekstremismen), Rana argued that religious debaters were driven away from the Norwegian public sphere, due to a perceived degradation of views based on religion. He used the case of then-bishop-elect of Oslo Ole Christian Kvarme as an example, claiming that Kvarme was exposed to the "pillory of modern society" when commentators largely denounced his Conservative Christian views. Rana warned against a perceived intolerance of religious practice, citing France and Turkey as bad examples due to the Islamic dress controversy in those countries and portrayed the US as the remarkable illustration of a moderate secular nation which allows and includes religious expressions.

==== Muhammad cartoons ====
Regarding the Jyllands-Posten Muhammad cartoons, Norwegian flags were burned in the Middle East. Rana said that "the burning of the Norwegian flag, all because a small number of Christian extremists published pictures of the Prophet, is unfair", according to the Verdens Gang. He was accused by Hege Storhaug, of "exploiting" the situation to promote illiberal attitudes towards perceived blasphemous expressions. The day before Rana had described Storhaug as "extremely xenophobic", "paranoid", adherent of racism and an "extremist" who "hates Islam", in Verdens Gang. He then countered that Storhaug's allegations were untrue.

When one of the cartoons were reprinted in a Norwegian magazine in September 2008, Rana described it as "vulgar", "unnecessary and desperate". "Criticism of Islam is important, but there are other and better ways to do it", Rana commented.
