= Børre Knudsen =

Norwegian Lutheran priest and anti-abortion activist

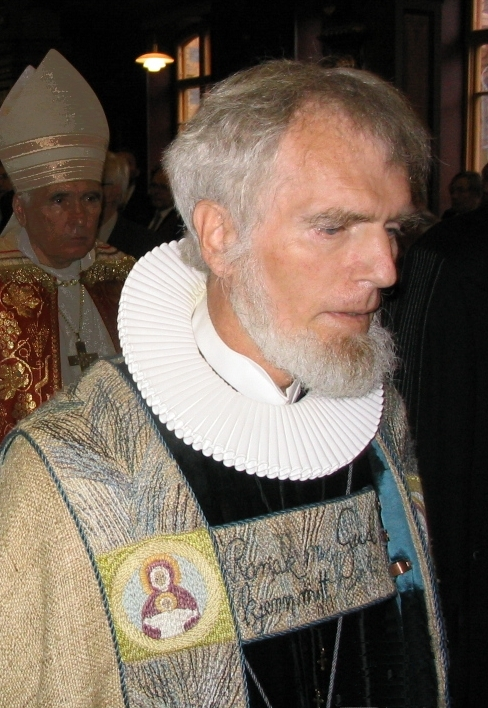
- Knudsen as bishop of the Deanery of Strandebarm, the "Church of Norway in Exile"
- Born: Børre Arnold Knudsen; 24 September 1937; Vennesla, Norway
- Died: 17 August 2014 (aged 76); Balsfjord, Norway
- Known for: Anti-abortion activism
- Spouse: Ragnhild Knudsen (m. 1964)
- Religion: Christianity (Lutheran)
- Church: Church of Norway; "Church of Norway in Exile"
- Ordained: 1967 (priest); 1997 (bishop)
- Laicized: 2001 (Church of Norway)

Børre Arnold Knudsen (1937–2014) was a Norwegian Lutheran priest noted for his anti-abortion activism. Together with Ludvig Nessa, he staged protests at abortion clinics starting in the late 1980s, and he spent time in jail for refusing to pay fines received for his protests.

Dismissed as parish priest of Balsfjord Municipality in 1983 due to his refusal to perform his official state duties in protest against new abortion laws, he helped establish the Deanery of Strandebarm in 1991, also known as the "Church of Norway in Exile". He was ordained as bishop by the church in 1997 until retiring in 2008 due to failing health. He was defrocked from the Church of Norway in 2001.

Knudsen was also noted as a prolific hymnist, and two of his hymns were later included in the Norwegian hymnal, as well as the hymnals of other churches.

== Early life ==
Knudsen was born on 24 September 1937 in Vennesla Municipality in Vest-Agder county, to priest Rolf Godwin Knudsen (1907–56) and Nina Lydersen (1913–95). He grew up in Langesund where his father was the local parish priest. His father was arrested and defrocked during the German occupation of Norway in the Second World War, causing a lasting impression on Knudsen. His mother also did resistance work, and the family was forced to move to neutral Sweden for a time during the war. They moved to Bergen in 1952, and Knudsen started studying theology in 1956. He completed his seminary education in 1966 and was ordained as a priest in the Church of Norway in 1967. He served as an assistant priest in Balsfjord Municipality in Troms county from 1968 until 1971, when he was made priest of the parish there.

== Activism ==
In 1979, when the Norwegian parliament finalized legislation allowing abortion on demand in the first trimester, Knudsen protested by refusing to perform any duties on behalf of the Norwegian state. He claimed he was modeling his actions on the Norwegian bishops' and majority of priests' opposition to the Nazi-friendly regime in Norway during the occupation in the Second World War. He continued his duties as a minister of the church and pastor for his congregation, but would not report statistics to the state, issue birth certificates or open mail addressed to him as a civil servant. Neither would he accept his salary from the state.

Minister of Church and Education Einar Førde dismissed Knudsen from his post for neglecting his duties, but Knudsen refused to abandon his pastoral duties. His active congregation insisted that he was still their pastor and urged him not to leave. Knudsen was sued by the state, but won the first round. He eventually lost the case on appeal to the Supreme Court of Norway in 1983. The Supreme Court decision held that the state part of the church office could not be separated from the ecclesial or spiritual part of it within a State Church. Knudsen was replaced as parish priest in Balsfjord, but most of his active congregation followed him in establishing an independent local elect congregation in the tradition of the Norwegian Lutheran church.

Two other priests, Ludvig Nessa and Per Kørner, joined him in his protest and were also terminated from their posts and defrocked. In 1987, these three started non-violent protests at abortion clinics, turning up in traditional ministerial robes and singing psalms. They also performed other public stunts such as symbolic burials of small coffins, and pouring blood over themselves outside the Norwegian parliament. This would continue until they were brought in by the police and received fines. Knudsen was jailed for three weeks in 1994 for not having paid the fines he received for protests at abortion clinics. The three established the Deanery of Strandebarm in 1991, proclaiming it the "Church of Norway in Exile". Knudsen was ordained bishop of the church on 6 April 1997 at a sermon in Kautokeino Church, after two new priests had joined the cause the same year. Knudsen was finally defrocked from the Church of Norway in 2001. He resigned as "anti-bishop" in 2008 due to failing health.

== Hymn poet ==
Knudsen was a noted hymn poet, and wrote hymn poetry in the traditions of Petter Dass, Thomas Kingo and Grundtvig. Some of his hymns were included in the official hymnals of other churches, and although he initially refused to have them admitted in the official Norwegian hymnal, two were later included.

Knudsen wrote a large amount of hymn poetry, and collections of some of his sermons have been printed in books and booklets. His hymns point to Chalcedonian Christology, and to a high interpretation of the sacraments. His hymns are mainly edited in Det Hellige Bryllup, (Oslo 1976) Sangverk for Den Norske kirke, (Oslo 1980), and may be found in the Norwegian 1998 Roman Catholic Hymnal as well as in other collections.

== Personal life ==
Knudsen married Ragnhild Knudsen (née Iden) in 1964. They had five children together.

A documentary about Knudsen and his life premiered at Norwegian cinemas in March 2014 titled "En prest og en plage", which portrayed the aging Knudsen in a close-up personal and somewhat more sympathetic light. Considered a generally somewhat more respected figure among the Norwegian anti-abortionists, Knudsen was praised after his death by some long-time critics of Knudsen who voiced their respect for his dedication and for his hymn poetry .

He was diagnosed with Parkinson's disease in 2004, and spent his last winters in Altea, Spain. Knudsen died on 17 August 2014 at his home in Mestervik in Balsfjord Municipality, Troms county.
