= Erik Gjems-Onstad =

Norwegian lawyer, officer, politician

Erik Gjems-Onstad MBE
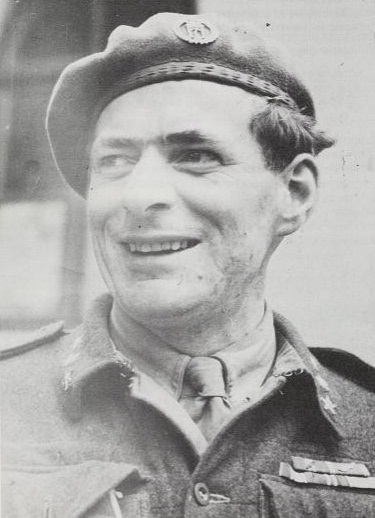
- Erik Gjems-Onstad in May 1945.

Parliamentary Leader of Anders Lange's Party
- In office 1 November 1974 – 1 October 1976
- Leader: Eivind Eckbo; Arve Lønnum
- Preceded by: Anders Lange
- Succeeded by: Harald Slettebø

Member of the Norwegian Parliament
- In office 1 October 1973 – 30 September 1977
- Constituency: Akershus

Personal details
- Born: 22 February 1922 Kristiania, Norway
- Died: 18 November 2011 (aged 89) Bærum, Akershus, Norway
- Party: Conservative Party (1960–64; 1988; 2005–07); Anders Lange's Party (1973–76); Independent (1976–77); Stop Immigration (1988–90); Fatherland Party (1991); Pensioners' Party (2007)
- Other political affiliations: Libertas; People's Movement Against Immigration; Stop Islamisation of Norway
- Spouse(s): Borgny Pedersen, 1949–73 (divorced); Inger Opseth, 1974–2011 (his death)
- Children: 3
- Profession: Lawyer, officer, politician
- Awards: Norwegian War Cross With Sword; St. Olav's Medal With Oak Branch; Norwegian Defence Medal; Haakon VII 70th Anniversary Medal; Military OBE; 1939–1945 Star; British Defence Medal; British War Medal

Military service
- Allegiance: Norway
- Branch/service: • Norwegian Independent Company 1 (1941–45) • Norwegian Home Guard (1947–59) • Royal Norwegian Air Force (1970–80)
- Rank: • Second Lieutenant in 1944 • Captain in 1947 • Colonel in 1970
- Battles/wars: Second World War • Occupation of Norway by Nazi Germany

Erik-Ørn Gjems-Onstad (22 February 1922 – 18 November 2011) was a Norwegian resistance member, officer, lawyer, sports official, politician, author and anti-immigration activist.

Gjems-Onstad joined the Norwegian resistance movement after Nazi Germany invaded Norway in 1940. He was arrested in Sweden for his involvement with Norwegian resistance activity in the country in 1941, and was sent to the United Kingdom where he joined the Norwegian Independent Company 1 (Kompani Linge) and received British military training. He was deployed to Norway in 1943 as part of Lark, assigned with establishing radio connection with London. He led Lark in Trøndelag between 1943 and 1945, which constituted the leadership of Milorg in the region. His other activities included assisting with weapons smuggling, preparing for the sinking of the German battleship Tirpitz, and plotting to assassinate Nazi collaborator Ivar Grande. He also founded the Durham organisation for conducting psychological warfare towards the end of the war, and he took part in blowing up railway tracks. Gjems-Onstad's efforts during the Second World War led him to become one of Norway's highest decorated war heroes.

He joined the Norwegian Home Guard after the war, where he served as a captain. He completed his education in law, and also worked as a judge and lawyer. He ultimately reached the rank of colonel in the military, as military lawyer of the Royal Norwegian Air Force. For some years he was CEO of a project that planned to develop the Vaterland neighbourhood in Oslo. Gjems-Onstad also had a career in sports, representing the sports club SK Rye in cycling and racewalking. He later worked as a sports official, as a board member, and as chairman of various national sports bodies.

A former member of the Conservative Party and the libertarian organisation Libertas, Gjems-Onstad joined Anders Lange's Party when it was founded in 1973 and became the party's deputy leader. He was elected a Member of Parliament in the 1973 parliamentary election, and became the party's parliamentary leader following Anders Lange's death in 1974. Many of his views and proposals caused controversy, and he was in conflict with the new leadership of the party, which was eventually headed by Carl I. Hagen. Gjems-Onstad was expelled from the party in 1976, and finished his term as an independent. He also became known for criticising the Norwegian government's policy in Africa, and for defending the governments of countries such as Rhodesia and South Africa. In the 1980s he worked as an attorney for several anti-immigration activists, and from the late 1980s he became involved in anti-immigration politics himself. He stood in election for the Stop Immigration party in 1989 and for the Fatherland Party in 1991, and he was later involved in the People's Movement Against Immigration and Stop Islamisation of Norway.

== Early life ==
Erik-Ørn Gjems-Onstad was born in Kristiania (modern-day Oslo) to jurist and civil servant Olaf Gjems-Onstad (1882–1945) and architect Ågot Urbye (1886–1959). He worked at sea as a cabin boy in 1937, and went to port in both Africa and Asia. He finished his secondary education in 1940.

Gjems-Onstad had been active in the Boy Scouts, where he learned navigation and map-reading. In late 1939, he was asked to teach these skills in a volunteer military training program. He later replaced the scout leader who was called up to fight in the Winter War. Due to the war in Europe, scouting exercises were treated seriously, and Gjems-Onstad claims the movement played an important role in the early organisation of Norwegian resistance. In the winter of 1939/40, Gjems-Onstad commenced training in nighttime orienteering and signaling. The weekend before the invasion, he and a friend "prepared" for war by sleeping in a tent in the snow in the forest.

== Second World War ==
=== Early activities ===
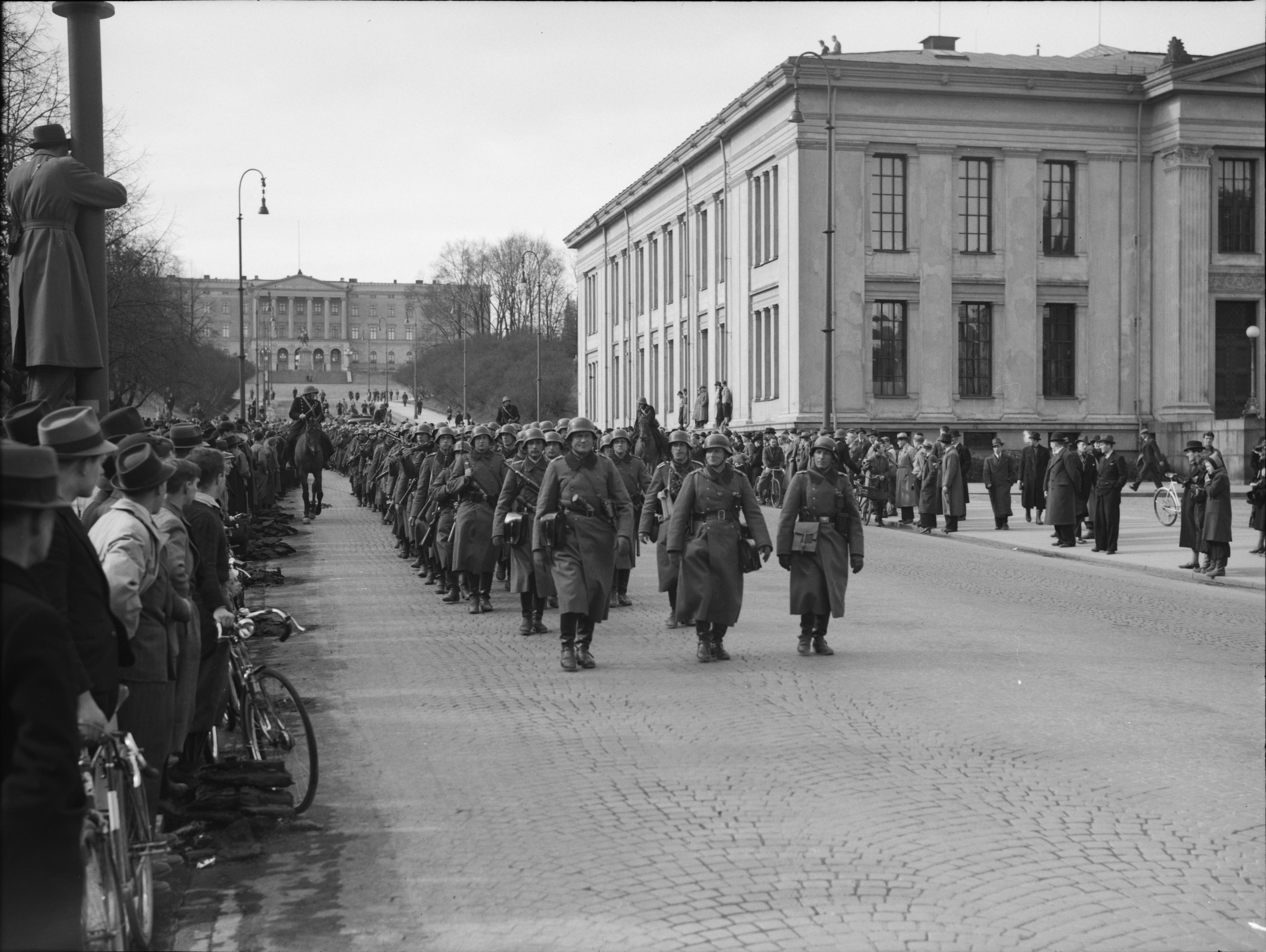
German soldiers marching through Oslo on 9 April 1940. The boy on the bike to the left has traditionally been regarded to be Gunnar Sønsteby, but Gjems-Onstad later claimed he had evidence that it was actually him.

On 9 April 1940, Nazi Germany invaded and occupied Norway as a part of the Second World War. Gjems-Onstad became aware of the German presence when he and his family saw German planes flying right over their home. They received no notification of what was happening, and music was the only thing playing on the radio. Gjems-Onstad took his bike and cycled to his school, the Oslo Cathedral School, only to find it closed and in chaos. He then went to the city centre and Karl Johans gate, where he witnessed the Germans marching through. Either that day or the day following, a German Junkers plane crashed near him and his friend when they were on their way from Lysaker to get a closer view of the captured Fornebu Airport. They attempted to rescue the Germans trapped inside the plane, but the heat was unbearable, and the Germans told them to run to safety just moments before the plane exploded. The proclamation by Norwegian Prime Minister Johan Nygaardsvold on 10 April (that rejected the German claim to appoint Vidkun Quisling as Norwegian Prime Minister), was according to Gjems-Onstad received with great disappointment by him and his friends. He thought it contained nothing but verbiage, with no remarks about mobilisation, defence, fighting or war. He thereafter wanted to join the resistance, but on his way met a man who told him that he would be rejected if he had not been through recruit training, and he thus returned home. After a few days, he and a friend nevertheless set out for Northern Norway. They came as far north as Nord-Trøndelag, where they however gave up and returned home.

Gjems-Onstad started studying at the University of Oslo in late 1940, and he got in touch with students who wanted to organise a resistance movement. One time, he and other youth who sympathised with the resistance disrupted a public meeting held by the fascist party Nasjonal Samling (NS). They deliberately clapped their hands so relentlessly (they considered that they could not get punished for "cheering") that the speakers could not speak, and thereafter started leaving the room. Many were however blocked from leaving, and Gjems-Onstad and a few others were arrested and fined due to their role in the event. In September he participated in a clash between students and a group of Hirden members (the NS's paramilitary organisation) outside the university. A young boy came by during the initial stand-off, asking Gjems-Onstad what was happening. Gjems-Onstad responded that the others were traitors, and Hirden members thus captured him and beat him up. Later, due to an outbreak of foot-and-mouth disease in December, Gjems-Onstad took part in digging mass graves for slaughtered cows in Dikemark and in Nesøya.

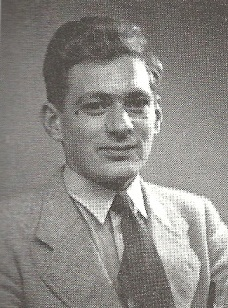
Erik Gjems-Onstad in the early 1940s.

In late 1940, Gjems-Onstad's group wanted to bring some newly created military devices to Allied forces. It was decided that one of them was to travel to the UK, while Gjems-Onstad was to travel to Stockholm. Gjems-Onstad was joined by three others, and they decided to let themselves be arrested in Östmark in Sweden. They were transported to Stockholm, but the Norwegian legation was not interested in the inventions. Gjems-Onstad was then directed to contact the British military attaché. He reached Major Malcolm Munthe, who was interested in the devices. Gjems-Onstad was arrested by Swedish police in Stockholm on 25 March 1941, as parts of Munthe's organisation had been compromised. Gjems-Onstad was imprisoned at the Stockholm police station for 13 days, and then for 59 days in the Stockholm Remand Prison. On 23 May 1941, the government decided that he was to be expelled and banned from entering Sweden (the ban was repealed after the war). He was originally scheduled to be deported to Canada via Moscow and China, but the plans were halted due to the German invasion of the Soviet Union. He was instead sent to the Norwegian refugee camp in Öreryd. He was ordered by the British to escape from Öreryd in October 1941 and travel to Norway. He was captured by the Swedish Home Guard close to the Norwegian border, but was sent by plane to the UK by Swedish authorities in December.

=== In the resistance ===
After arriving in the UK, Gjems-Onstad joined the Norwegian Independent Company 1 (Kompani Linge) and took British military education. The British decided in 1943 to deploy him to Trøndelag in Norway together with Odd Sørli, Johnny Pevik and Nils Uhlin Hansen. The deployment was necessary as Evald Hansen and Herluf Nygaard had been captured and tortured in December 1942 (Nygaard later escaped, Hansen died at Falstad). Sørli and Gjems-Onstad were set to maintain Lark, establish radio connection with London and get intelligence about the German battleship Tirpitz, at the time located in the Trondheimsfjord. When he was training at Glen More Lodge near Aviemore, Gjems-Onstad was ordered to go to London, where he was supplied with a 20 kg radio transmitter and other equipment. Together with Sørli he travelled to Inverness by train, and to Shetland by plane, under stormy weather conditions. They initially set out with the fishing boat Harald II from Scalloway in late February, but due to unusually stormy weather they were driven back to Shetland three times after three unsuccessful attempts to reach Ålesund; the last attempt destroyed their equipment as the boat was bursted open. They had their equipment replaced, and set out for Kristiansund in March instead on a bigger boat. With easier, yet still poor weather, the voyage took two days. When they reached land they noticed that they had reached Kya Lighthouse, much farther to the north of their original destination, but they decided to make landfall anyway. From there they travelled with fake identification via Namsos to Trondheim, where they reunited with fellow Lark members Johnny Pevik and Nils Uhlin Hansen, the other group sent from London. Gjems-Onstad thereafter assisted Pevik and Hansen with transporting five tons of weapons from an uninhabited island near Lyngvær to Trondheim.

Lark received missions from London (sometimes via Stockholm), and constituted the leadership of Milorg in Trøndelag where they in practice were the same entity. Gjems-Onstad started his operations in Trondheim by establishing radio connection with London and operating the radio transmitter, and he soon became one of the most important persons in the leadership of Milorg. His saboteur activity included to prepare the sinking of Tirpitz, but the plans were never realised as the ship had left the Trondheimsfjord in early 1943. Sørli commanded Gjems-Omstad to a spontaneous assassination of Nazi collaborator Ivar Grande after spotting him incidentally, but Gjems-Onstad aborted after noticing a division of Russian POWs, fearing for what in turn might happen to them if he went through with the assassination. Some days later he again plotted to assassinate Grande together with Sørli and Ingebrigt Gausland. They delivered a box booby trapped with an egg hand grenade to his home, but Grande foiled the attempt with advice Norwegian Gestapo agent Henry Rinnan (who was present at the time) had received on not to open such boxes. Following the attempted assassination, he was ordered to not get himself involved in any further such attempts, as it was considered too risky for him. Gjems-Onstad took over as leader of the group from Sørli in October 1943, and it was decided to pull him out of Norway and close the radio station following news that Pevik had been arrested. He left Trondheim for Stockholm later that month, and received training in psychological warfare.

When Sørli came to Stockholm in January 1944 he took over for Gjems-Onstad, while Gjems-Onstad was to take over the leadership of Lark as well as to reorganise Milorg. Gjems-Onstad also founded the propaganda organisation Durham when he came back to Trondheim in March 1944. Lark and Durham were to be kept completely separate, with Gjems-Onstad as their only mutual connection. Durham's mission was to influence the moral of the enemy, mainly through distributing brochures (an estimated 115,000 copies in total) and posters (an estimated 257,000), while also to cause irritation by minor sabotage. The brochures were chiefly distributed in the enemy's quarters, and the posters were put up throughout Trondheim. Members of the group also tore down Nazi posters, sabotaged German vehicles, threw stink bombs into restaurants and cinemas, and applied itching powder—notably in condoms for sale to German soldiers. Sabotage on a bigger scale had to be authorised from London, and was largely discouraged as it would risk unnecessary German reprisals. Gjems-Onstad reported back in Stockholm at the end of June. Eager to bring supplies to Trondheim, he and Sørli soon decided to transport propaganda material, handguns and explosives to the Norwegian border. After finding a lost resistance member in the mountains, Gjems-Onstad joined a course in Alby near Stockholm where he worked as instructor in "silent killing" for a month. He went for a short mission to Trondheim in July in order to insert Egil Løkse as Lark's new radio operator there.

By his next time in Trondheim, the Gestapo had gained knowledge of Gjems-Onstad's activities, and did their utmost to capture him. Gjems-Onstad went back to Trondheim at the end of October. He was to establish a new radio station, and investigate if Milorg and Lark could be rebuilt, as the organisation had been severely damaged by multiple arrests and murders. Durham was however largely intact. The mission went into a new phase, as the Norwegian resistance started organising defence against potential destructions during the now largely inevitable German withdrawal. A continuation of the scorched earth policy practiced in Northern Norway was particularly feared. Gjems-Onstad and Lark were not to lead the defence, but rather to organise it and train new recruits. In November he authorised the creation of the illegal newspaper For Friheten by his own initiative, the first in Trondheim in years. He also operated the paper DFP, or Deutsche Freiheitspartei, a form of black propaganda distributed to German soldiers and officers. He became increasingly frustrated with the damages caused by Rinnan and his gang of Nazi collaborators, and he vocally advocated their assassination. He reported back to Stockholm in November, and as he saw it, little remained of Milorg in Trøndelag after this. He however noted the importance of Durham, which he considered to have grown very powerful.

In early 1945 Gjems-Onstad took part in blowing up railway tracks on the stretches around Støren Station, but the group had a limited supply of explosives, and the practical effects of the bombings could thus not cause as much effect as wanted. They could for instance not go through with blowing up the railway bridge near Hovin, which they sought as their main target. He was transferred back to Stockholm in March 1945, and Durham was dissolved. He reacted with shock that London had decided that it was too dangerous for him to return to Trondheim. He was uneasy about being set on the sideline, and headed a mission of four men from Stockholm to Namsvatnet at the end of the month to receive British sabotage supplies. They established a base of operations, as well as radio connection to the UK by the station Quail. The mission returned to Stockholm in early April, and Gjems-Onstad was transferred to a mission in Northern Norway. He was in Troms at the time of the German capitulation.

=== Decorations ===
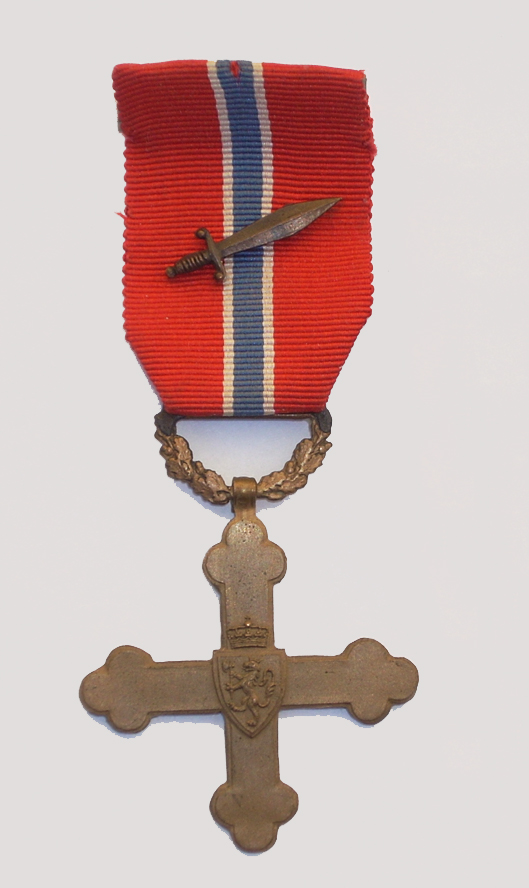
Gjems-Onstad was awarded the War Cross, Norway's highest decoration, for his efforts in the war.

In 1944 Gjems-Onstad was promoted to second lieutenant (fenrik). He was appointed Member of the Order of the British Empire in 1941, and decorated with the Haakon VII 70th Anniversary Medal in 1942, the St. Olav's Medal With Oak Branch in 1944, the Defence Medal, War Medal 1939–1945, 1939–1945 Star and the Norwegian Defence Medal in 1945 and the Norwegian War Cross with Sword in 1947. As such he was one of Norway's highest decorated war heroes.

In 1947 he played himself in the documentary film Det grodde fram about the Norwegian resistance movement in Trondheim.

=== Views ===
Gjems-Onstad became critical of the "retracted regional leadership" of the Home Front (hjemmefronten) which he became aware of in late 1944. According to him, he and his fellow resistance members had not even heard of their existence. He sent a wire to London requesting that they should take over what remained of Milorg, rather than remaining passive during the occupation only to step forward as leaders of Milorg when the war was over. He became more critical when he became aware that they had started entering the administration in London and Stockholm, according to him without the necessary experience from practical fieldwork. He was shocked at the recklessness of one of them who arrived at one of their bases in Trondheim, concluding that they "obviously had no idea about how strong the infiltration really was in Trondheim, nor how we worked." The regional leadership that stepped forward after the war was according to Gjems-Onstad not identical with the actual leadership of Lark and Milorg during the war.

Historians have noted that it was "very surprising" that Erling Gjone stepped forward as the leader of the Home Front in Trøndelag after the German capitulation. He had entered the administration in Stockholm in February 1945, but he had not been contacted whatsoever by Lark. The decision of putting Gjems-Onstad on the sideline in March 1945 led him to become increasingly critical of the leadership in London, which had gradually become more Norwegian than British, and subsequently decayed into what Gjems-Onstad considered to be a lack of professionality. He also questioned Norway's military abilities in a possible future war in Norway, based on post-war developments. According to Gjems-Onstad, what influenced him and his contemporaries to join the resistance was a national feeling that—speaking some 60 years after war—he then considered that was "almost gone."

Gjems-Onstad deliberated his post-war views on the war in a 2008 ten-minute television special. As he saw it, the Norwegian Labour Party government before the war stood "entirely on the side of the Soviet Union." He pointed to the Soviet Union as the greatest murderer of the war, and considered that nobody had "opened their eyes" to the fact that the Soviet Union was the only country that won territorial gains following the war. While he maintained that the coup headed by Vidkun Quisling was both bad and illegal, he considered that Quisling should be judged softer in light of the situation at the time. He pointed to the government fleeing the country, and what he considered the "pitiful" reaction of Prime Minister Johan Nygaardsvold. He also noted that while some of the figures in the Quisling regime had acted out far too harshly, some others had tried to maintain Norway's interests against the occupiers; the alternative of letting the Germans run the country completely unopposed under Josef Terboven could in his mind have ended up far worse. Gjems-Onstad said he believed that the treason by Quisling should be compared with the lack of preparations for war by Nygaardsvold and the Labour Party government. Gjems-Onstad also complained that he for unexplained reasons had been kept away from public arrangements related to the Second World War. He said he had not been invited to a single such event. He was also in possession of a large archive of wartime material from the resistance movement in Trøndelag, but said he had not been approached with interest by any public institution.

== Professional career ==
Gjems-Onstad joined the Norwegian Home Guard after the war. From 1947 to 1959 he held the rank of captain there. He was mobilisation manager as military lawyer colonel at Strike Command Southern Norway (Luftkommando Sør-Norge), one of the Air Commands of the Royal Norwegian Air Force, from 1970 to 1980. He also completed his education in law, graduating with a cand.jur. degree in 1948. He worked as a judge in southern Buskerud from 1948 to 1949, and in 1949 he opened a law firm in Oslo. From 1957 he had access to work with Supreme Court cases. He was also a consultant or secretary for Norsk Gartnerforening, Bruktbilhandlerforeningen/Autoriserte Bruktbilhandleres handelsforbund and for the local branch of the Norwegian Bar Association. He was a board member of the local Bar Association chapter from 1960 to 1964 and of Max Manus AS, the eponymous company belonging to former resistance member Max Manus, from 1965 to 1969. Gjems-Onstad had served with Manus in the Norwegian Home Guard after the war, and had met his later wife Tikken Manus for the first time in 1943 when she worked as a military attaché in Stockholm. The three remained lifetime close friends ever since they met during the war.

In 1961 Gjems-Onstad left his lawyer's firm to work as a consultant in Den norske Creditbank. He became a central figure in the DnC's plans to develop the Vaterland neighbourhood in Oslo. AS Vaterland was created soon after the DnC had been granted construction rights in 1965, and was a project designated for planning to develop the Vaterland neighbourhood into a business and office centre. Gjems-Onstad was a board member of AS Vaterland from 1966 to 1972, and was its CEO from 1970. He soon got the nickname the "Vaterland King" (Vaterlandskongen), after a local 1930s house owner. After a while, the plans for the development was dropped, as neither the bank nor the municipality saw it to be in their interests to realise the plans. Gjems-Onstad was removed from his position with a golden parachute of 500,000 kr in 1972 and lost his faith in the project.

From 1972 to 1977 he operated a lawyer's firm in Oslo again, and from 1977 he moved his office to Hvalstad and worked as a defender in Asker and Bærum District Court. He retired as a defender in 1990, but remained a lawyer until 2001. During the 1980s he defended several anti-immigration activists, including Vivi Krogh, Jan Ødegård and Arne Myrdal. He also stated that he by 1994 had helped draft the wills of several anonymous persons who wanted to designate their fortunes, ranging from 100,000 kr to 10 million kr, to persons and organisations working against immigration.

== Sports official ==
Gjems-Onstad had an active career in sports. He represented the club SK Rye which he joined on 1 August 1936, and was made an honorary member of the club in 1986. He became the Norwegian junior champion in cycling in 1939. He was also an active race walker, with two sixth places in the Norwegian championships achieved between 1967 and 1969. He chaired the Norwegian Cycling Federation from 1959 to 1965 and the Norwegian Walking Association from 1967 to 1973. He was a member of the Norwegian Olympic Committee from 1959 to 1973 and a deputy board member of the Norwegian Confederation of Sports from 1965 to 1967. He was an official for Norway at the Summer Olympics in 1960 and 1972, and in 1993 he sat on the committee that organized the 1993 UCI Road World Championships. In 1967 he initiated Styrkeprøven, a yearly cyclosportive from Trondheim to Oslo. He completed the race himself more than fifteen times; the last times with the starting number "1".

== Politics ==
=== Member of Parliament ===
From 1960 to 1964 Gjems-Onstad was a member of the school board in Oslo, representing the Conservative Party. He was also a member of the libertarian organisation Libertas, but had left it by 1971 as he considered that it had become "too tame." When Anders Lange's Party (ALP) was founded in 1973 he joined the party and became deputy leader under Anders Lange. He had been present at the founding meeting at Saga kino, and was offered a place in the party's central leadership by Anders Lange after they one day incidentally met outside Gjems-Onstad's lawyer's office. From then on he was the most central person in the party after Lange himself. Besides his leading positions in business and sports, Gjems-Onstad had for years expressed his political views in newspapers and journals, which broadly coincided with Lange's views. By offering him positions in the party, Lange particularly thought that Gjems-Onstad could help develop the party politically and organisationally. In the 1973 parliamentary election he won a seat in the Norwegian Parliament from Akershus, and became a member of the Standing Committee on Finance and the Election Committee. During his term he set a new record for number of times speaking to the assembly—325 times in one year.

At the start of his parliamentary term he made some proposals that were opposed by the entire parliament, including his own party. He proposed in November 1973 to introduce gun and shooting training as an optional course for students in high school, and to separate church and state (with its financial implications). The proposals were criticised in a press statement by Anders Lange and the party's two other MPs. Turmoil later also erupted in the Akershus and Bærum chapters of the party, and calls were made for expelling Gjems-Onstad due to his proposals in parliament; this wing however left the party in 1975 after being in clear minority. Gjems-Onstad and Lange nonetheless stood together in their conflict with Carl I. Hagen and Kristofer Almås, who sought to strengthen the party's deliberately loose organisation. After Lange's death in 1974, Gjems-Onstad became leader of the party's parliamentary group. While Hagen and Almås had broken out and formed the Reform Party earlier the same year, Gjems-Onstad welcomed Hagen back to the party in 1975 for "constructive cooperation". He thereafter changed to support the work led by Hagen and Arve Lønnum of strengthening the party organisation.

Gjems-Onstad's cooperation with Hagen was however not to last. In early 1976 Gjems-Onstad voiced his discontent with the ever-ongoing conflicts within the party, and he had by mid-year not decided whether or not he wanted to run for re-election. He eventually felt squeezed out of the party, and wanted no part in the intriguing he considered Hagen to represent. He was replaced as parliamentary leader of the party at the start of October. After he in turn recommended voters to rather vote for the Conservative Party in an interview with Aftenposten, he was finally expelled from the party by a unanimously approved motion put forward by Carl I. Hagen later the same month. Gjems-Onstad finished his term as an independent.

=== Positions in parliament ===
Before the 1973 election Gjems-Onstad advocated a restrictive immigration policy in an interview with Morgenbladet. After being elected to parliament, he was the sole member of the Finance Committee to oppose agreements of raising fuel taxes in 1973. He proposed steep budget cuts in 1974, notably in press support and in the Office of the Prime Minister. He proposed to abolish the Ministry of the Environment and the Ministry of Consumer Affairs and Administration, as well as 22 laws the same year. Gjems-Onstad also wanted to abolish conscription. In 1975 he criticised parliament for violating the Norwegian Constitution by regularly holding session with less than half of the representatives present. Prime Minister Trygve Bratteli in turn claimed that Gjems-Onstad "undermined democracy" because he was present and spoke in parliament too much.

Gjems-Onstad was among the signatories of a petition in 1974 that called on the Norwegian government to secure Israel's existence. He wanted to terminate the Norwegian government's support of liberation movements in Portuguese Guinea the same year. He proposed to end all public foreign aid, and instead grant tax deduction to private donations. He also proposed to prioritise Norwegian interests in Antarctica higher, and to align Norway's ambassador to Thailand with South Vietnam. He advocated expelling the five Soviet KGB spies who had been exposed in Norway in 1975, but gained no support from the government. He was criticised by the Norwegian Foreign Minister the same year for claiming that Tanzanian President Julius Nyerere used Norwegian taxes for "national socialist" experiments of forcibly moving populations.

=== Gjems-Onstad and Africa ===
Gjems-Onstad travelled extensively in Africa. He toured Portuguese Angola for a week in 1973, and was in Portuguese Guinea in 1974. He later claimed that blacks and whites had lived peacefully together in these countries when he had visited them before their decolonisation—after which he considered the conditions to be grim—and that the standard of living among blacks had been higher there than in many other places in Africa. He came to regard it as a life's mission to work for Africa, and believed that the Norwegian government's policy in Africa contributed to destroy the continent through supporting "wars of liberation" and failed foreign aid. He maintained that his prime concern was to warn against the entrenchment of socialism and communism in Africa.

He also travelled extensively throughout South Africa, and said that conditions for blacks were better there than in other African countries. He was introduced to a South African official visiting Norway in 1974 by Anders Lange, and visited the country himself in 1975 after being invited by the South African Department of Information. He met with figures including Connie Mulder, and following Lange's death he considered himself as the continuation of Lange's legacy with regards to the country. He supported the South African policy since the 1970s of gradually dismantling the apartheid system, which included the granting of independence to tribal homelands. He was in the country in April 1976 for a conference that was to prepare the establishment of Transkei. He later considered the homelands to be true democratic states governed by the rule of law, which he considered that many other African states were not. Gjems-Onstad strongly opposed the African National Congress and the Norwegian government's support of the group, as he believed their agenda would lead to civil war and a government led by revolutionary socialists—as had happened in other African countries. He later pointed to the development in former Rhodesia, Robert Mugabe's Zimbabwe. He arranged several study trips to South Africa, and was part of a group of eight Norwegians who toured the country in 1987 and issued an "apology" to the South African government for the Norwegian government's policy towards the country.

Gjems-Onstad traveled to Rhodesia in April 1979 as the sole Norwegian observer of the general election, after he had been invited by the Rhodesian Department of Information. He admitted at the same time that he for years had corresponded with the Rhodesian government about how he considered various institutions and individuals in Norway, particularly in the news media. The relationship was initiated after Gjems-Onstad had written a letter of sympathy to Rhodesian Prime Minister Ian Smith some years ahead. When in Salisbury, he met with Smith, Foreign Minister P. K. van der Byl and Head of the Military Peter Walls. Eager to participate with the government army during the Rhodesian Bush War, he was authorised by Walls to patrol with Rhodesian Security Forces around a garrison near Lake Kariba for two days. While he earlier had written he did not think democracy and human rights was optimal in the country—he considered Botswana to be one of the better countries—he considered rule of law to be better than in countries the Norwegian government had supported financially, such as Idi Amin's Uganda.

=== Later political activity ===
Carl I. Hagen wrote in his book Ærlighet varer lengst in 1984 that he would put his office on the line in order to prevent Gjems-Onstad from making a "comeback" to the Progress Party (ALP's successor), despite his alleged requests. Gjems-Onstad criticised Hagen strongly for his complicity in the establishment of a Labour Party government in 1986, and was a member of the Conservative Party by 1988. He supported prospects of a Conservative Party government led by Jan P. Syse, but criticised the Norwegian political system for being a "caricature" of democracy, instead considering it a particracy. Gjems-Onstad had according to his own statement in 1987 not seen any reason for getting himself involved in the public debate about immigration until then. The reaction followed a comment by Conservative Party student politician Knut Albert Solem, in which he "presupposed" that anti-immigration sentiment was based on feelings of "foreign-hate", something which Gjems-Onstad disputed. Gjems-Onstad contested the 1989 parliamentary election for the Stop Immigration party in Akershus, and chaired its regional chapter from 1988 to 1990. He was expelled from the party together with Hege Søfteland and Torfinn Hellandsvik due to their vocal criticism of the leadership of the party's leader Jack Erik Kjuus. In 1991 Gjems-Onstad ran unsuccessfully in the local election for the Fatherland Party, and he was later active in the People's Movement Against Immigration. He was also present at the meeting at Godlia kino in 1995. Gjems-Onstad expressed his outrage at the Lund Report in 1996 after it was revealed that he had been under surveillance by the Norwegian Police Security Service (POT), considering it defamatory and demanding an apology.

Gjems-Onstad came to believe that the recent mass immigration to Norway was a greater threat than the Nazi invasion of Norway, although he made clear he had nothing against "normal immigration" and individuals, nor about Norwegians finding spouses in other countries. What he stated he was concerned about was increasing ethnic tensions and Norwegians being outnumbered in Norway in the course of the 21st century, and he stated that what worried him the very most was the growth of Islam. Gjems-Onstad praised anti-immigration Progress Party MPs Vidar Kleppe and Øystein Hedstrøm at their election campaign rally in 1999, and participated in the demonstration against Muslim prayer calling in 2000. He was involved in the Conservative Party in Asker from 2005 to 2007, but joined the Pensioners' Party in 2007 as their top ballot candidate for the municipal election. As Gjems-Onstad called for a halt of immigration to Asker, he was instantly denounced by his own party. He also maintained that "Norway is the fatherland of the Norwegians, and Norwegians are a nation within the white race," and during a television debate with fellow lawyer and politician Abid Raja said that he could not call himself a Norwegian, only a Pakistani-Norwegian—they both nevertheless affirmed that they had great respect for each other. Gjems-Onstad was expelled from the Pensioners' Party before the election, but removal from the ballot is legally impossible. As the election was held the Pensioners' Party did not win any seats, and the local party leadership expressed their delight. Gjems-Onstad was also active as the internal meeting leader of Stop Islamisation of Norway (SIAN) and its predecessor FOMI from 2001 to 2009, and participated in a demonstration alongside SIAN's leader Arne Tumyr in 2009.

Gjems-Onstad made news in 2008 when he had talks with the disturbed man who fired a gun towards a refugee centre. He was also involved in a heritage distribution controversy. In her will, millionaire Clara Westin declared that 2.5 million kr be given to anti-immigration activists, and that the distribution be decided by a board consisting of four people. Egil Karlsen backed out and gave up his vote to Gjems-Onstad, and the other three were Gjems-Onstad, Norvald Aasen of the People's Movement Against Immigration and Bjarne Pettersen. It surfaced that suggestions by board members included the mother of one of the convicts of the murder of Benjamin Hermansen, Ole Nicolai Kvisler. While the background for involving Kvisler was his anti-immigration views, the pressing issue was the matter of his court ruling. Having followed the case closely as a former lawyer, Gjems-Onstad had disputed the court ruling as he believed there was not evidence to conclude that Kvisler had any more than possibly a subsidiary role in the murder; he thus explained the suggestion with providing funds for reopening his case. Gjems-Onstad maintained that it was only the other convict, Joe Erling Jahr, who had committed the murder. Pettersen had in addition wanted to distribute money to people from his circle around Vigrid (a group Gjems-Onstad loathed), such as Tore Tvedt and Øyvind Heian, but was squeezed out of the board after this was opposed by Gjems-Onstad and Aasen. The left-wing anti-racist organization SOS Rasisme petitioned the Norwegian state to confiscate Gjems-Onstad's war decorations, but to no avail. After all disputes were resolved, it was not made public who actually received any money.

== Personal life ==
Gjems-Onstad was married in 1949 to Borgny Pedersen (9 November 1921 – 2 July 2003). They divorced in 1973. He was married for the second time to Inger Opseth (born 2 October 1937) in 1974. Gjems-Onstad met Inger when he worked for the Vaterland-project, where she worked as an interior architect. Gjems-Onstad had three children, including his son, jurist Ole Gjems-Onstad.

He lived in Hvalstad, Asker, where he owned a nine decare small farm. The property included three equal parts of garden, forest and arable land. He often cut lumber from the forest to build his own furniture. At various times, he had rabbits, sheep, cows, calves, piglets and a fish pond of brown trout at his property. According to himself, he kept the livestock largely in protest against tax authorities, while also as a hobby.

Erik Gjems-Onstad died in November 2011 after short illness at the Bærum Hospital. He left behind his wife, children, grandchildren and great-grandchildren.

== Writings ==
Gjems-Onstad has authored several books. He wrote about the psychological warfare of the Norwegian resistance movement in DURHAM: hemmelige operasjoner i Trøndelag mot tysk okkkupasjonsmakt 1943-45, released in 1981. Durham was the codeword for the operations which to a large extent consisted of distributing flyers, brochures and posters with the purpose of demoralising the Germans. This was also the topic in Psykologisk krigføring i Norge under Annen Verdenskrig 1940-45, published in 1994. In 1990 he wrote about the resistance group Lark in LARK: Milorg i Trøndelag 1940-1945. He released the book Krigskorset og St. Olavsmedaljen med ekegren in 1995, which gives an overview of all the holders of Norway's highest wartime decorations. The reasons given for awarding the War Cross (Norway's highest decoration) was in the book also made public for the first time.

In 1984 he published the books Dagbok fra Tanzania: U-hjelp uten mening, a travel diary from Tanzania discussing what he considered to be failed foreign aid, and a travel diary from Israel, Dagbok fra Israel: Reiser og tanker. He wrote about alternative Norwegian policies towards South Africa in the 1985 book Syd-Afrika i dag: Boikott eller samarbeid. These books were published by Afrikainstituttet, of which he was board chairman from 1983 to 1990. In 1994, he chronicled the trials against Arne Myrdal in Myrdal-sakene. Gjems-Onstad has in addition released his own periodical, Nytt og kommentarer.

== Bibliography ==
- Alming, Knut (1995). Holdningskamp og motstandsvilje: NTH under krigen 1940–1945. Tapir. ISBN 978-82-519-1186-3.
- Christensen, Jan (2011). Oslogjengen. Oslo: Nova Forlag. ISBN 978-82-92390-47-4.
- Gjems-Onstad, Erik (1990). LARK: Milorg i Trøndelag 1940-1945. Stjørdal: Midt-Norge Forlag. ISBN 82-7358-017-2.
- Gjems-Onstad, Erik (1991). "Hvordan jeg opplevde krigen". In Fossum, Arvid (ed.). Milorg i Asker 1940-1945. Billingstad Asker. pp. 13–20.
- Gjems-Onstad, Erik, ed. (1995). Krigskorset og St. Olavsmedaljen med ekegren. Oslo: Grøndahl og Dreyers Forlag. ISBN 978-82-504-2190-5.
- Iversen, Jan Martin (1998). Fra Anders Lange til Carl I. Hagen: 25 år med Fremskrittspartiet. Oslo: Millennium. ISBN 82-517-8949-4.
- Jensen, Erling; Ratvik, Per; Ulstein, Ragnar, eds. (1995) [1948]. Kompani Linge. Vol. 2. Oslo: LibriArte. ISBN 82-445-0050-6.
- Lunde, Einar (1995). Paradisveien: dramatiske år i Afrika (8 ed.). Schibsted. ISBN 978-82-516-1579-2.
- Mauseth, Per Eggum (1991). "Vaterlandskongen". Oslo bak fasaden. Larvik: Pax Forlag. pp. 30–34. ISBN 82-530-1532-1.
- Rygnestad, Arild; Kvanmo, Hanna (1993). Anders Langes saga. Oslo: Samlaget. ISBN 82-521-4092-0.
