= Ole Gjems-Onstad =

Norwegian jurist

Ole Gjems-Onstad (born 8 August 1950) is a Norwegian jurist, son of resistance fighter and anti-immigration politician Erik Gjems-Onstad.

He graduated from the University of Oslo with a cand.jur. degree in 1979, and took the dr.juris. degree in 1984. In 1985 he was appointed professor in tax law at BI Norwegian Business School. He is also assisting professor at the University of Oslo since 2000 and at the University of Stavanger from 2002 to 2006, as well as adjunct professor at the Queensland University of Technology since 1993.

In 2021 he wrote an opinion piece in Stavanger Aftenblad in which he claimed that the youth-wing of the Norwegian Labour Party had used the memory of the 2011 Norway attacks for political gain, and to cast right-wing opponents in an unfavourable light. He also compared the disorganised response to the July 22 attacks to the response to the Nazi occupation in Norway. His comments were widely criticised in the Norwegian news media. His article was criticised by the leader of Young Labour for containing conspiracy theories, factual errors and serious allegations. His employer, BI Norwegian Business School distanced themselves immediately from his comments and Stavanger Aftenblad apologised the following week for publishing the article.

Gjems-Onstad's support in an op-ed for a “green pass”, allowing people to travel without restrictions if they have been vaccinated against COVID-19, has caused controversy. He argued that there would be no reason to keep restricting the freedom of vaccinated people. He further argued that to deny the right to travel freely to those who have been vaccinated, on the basis that vaccination supplies are limited, would amount to "orthodox communism". He rejects the idea that vaccine passports would create a two-tier society where inoculated people enjoy a restriction-free life while younger generations, waiting for their jab, continue to have their activities curtailed.
