= Vivi Krogh =

Norwegian political activist (1919–2014)

Vivi Krogh (18 October 1919 – 23 May 2014) was a Norwegian resistance member and leader of the anti-immigration group Organisasjon mot skadelig innvandring i Norge. She was in 1981 convicted for anti-Islamic hate speech by the Norwegian Supreme Court under Norway's so-called "racism paragraph" (§ 135a), and received a suspended 60-day sentence.

== Organisasjon mot skadelig innvandring i Norge ==
Krogh founded the Organisasjon mot skadelig innvandring i Norge (Organisation Against Harmful Immigration in Norway) in 1978. Krogh stepped down as leader of the organisation in August 1980 at a convention in Bergen, and the organisation went "underground" by not publicising the names of its members. At a demonstration Krogh held in Sandvika on 1 October 1980, her statements included that "Islam is just Hitler with another make-up," and "the Jews are my best friends." She was met by two to three hundred counter-demonstrators who chanted slogans against racism. The organisation had around 3,300 members in 1980.

== Conviction ==
She was in 1981 convicted under § 135a for having spread flyers that included strong criticism of Islam, and for opposing the immigration to Norway of guest workers from Islamic countries. She had distributed three different flyers, in a total 16,000 copies. She was initially convicted to a 120 days suspended sentence, but after an appeal to the Supreme Court got the sentence reduced to 60 days. The Supreme Court noted that attacks on Islamic religion and culture was not covered by § 135a. She was defended by Erik Gjems-Onstad. According to herself in her appeal, her main concern was to stop the immigration of guest workers from Islamic countries, to fight the growth of Islam; including to work against the plans of the building of a Mosque in Oslo. During interrogation she had among other things quoted from the Quran.
