= Afrikainstituttet =

Norwegian research organisation

Afrikainstituttet (English: Africa Institute) was a Norwegian organisation founded in 1983. The organisation's mission statement was to inform the public about the political, economic and cultural conditions of African countries. The chairman of the organisation was Erik Gjems-Onstad, while lawyer Erik Magnus Høyer, was its secretary and, professor Carl Borgin, vice chairman. The organisation was initially headquartered at Høyer's lawyer's firm in Sandefjord.

In 1983 it had plans of seminars about foreign aid and study trips to Africa. The organisation published the books Dagbok fra Tanzania: U-hjelp uten mening (1984), Dagbok fra Israel: Reiser og tanker (1984) and Syd-Afrika i dag: Boikott eller samarbeid (1985), as well as the periodical Nytt og kommentarer.
