= Styrkeprøven =

Norwegian bicycle race

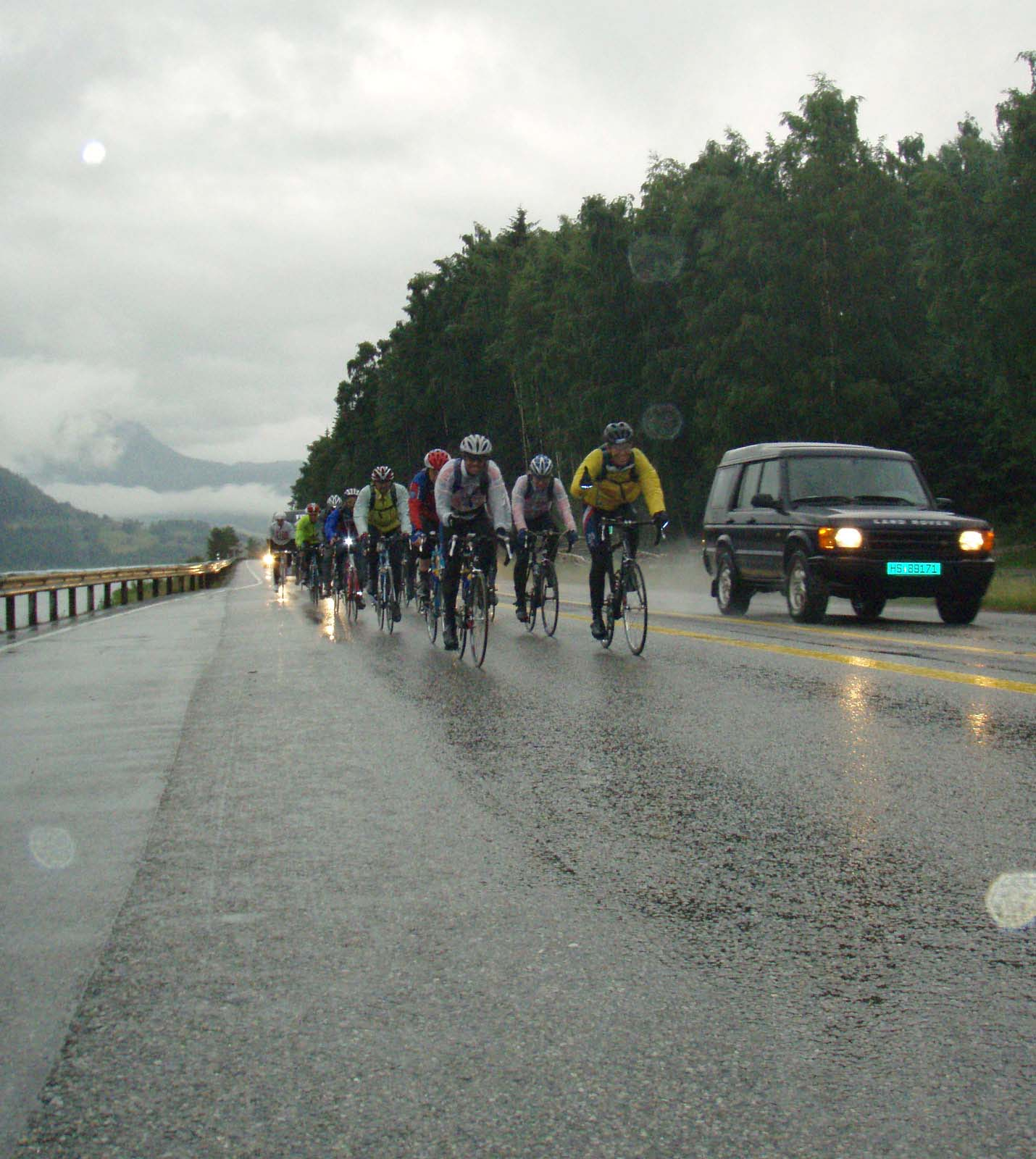
Participants in 2007, somewhere in Gudbrandsdalen.

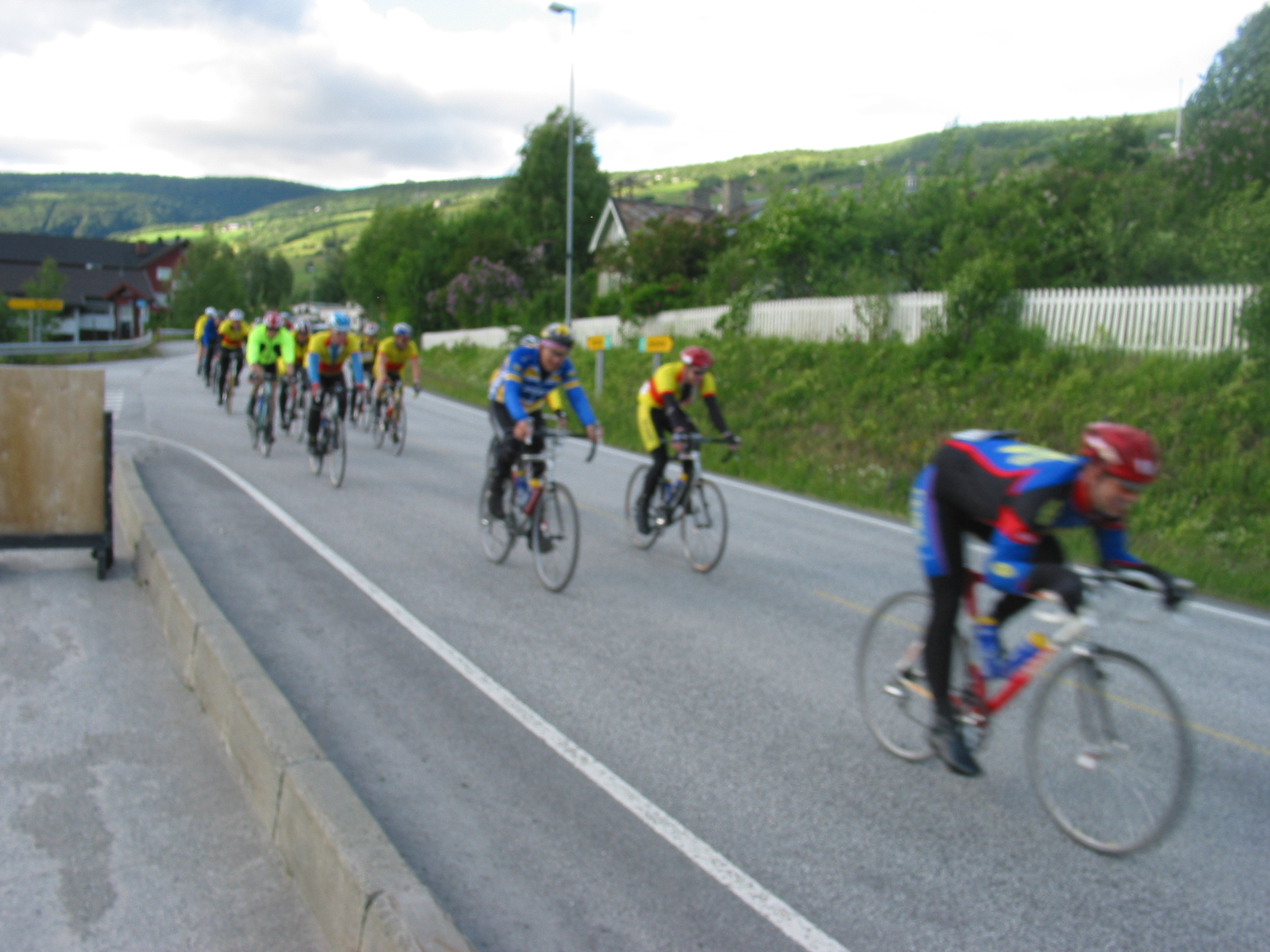
Participants in 2008, at Hundorp.

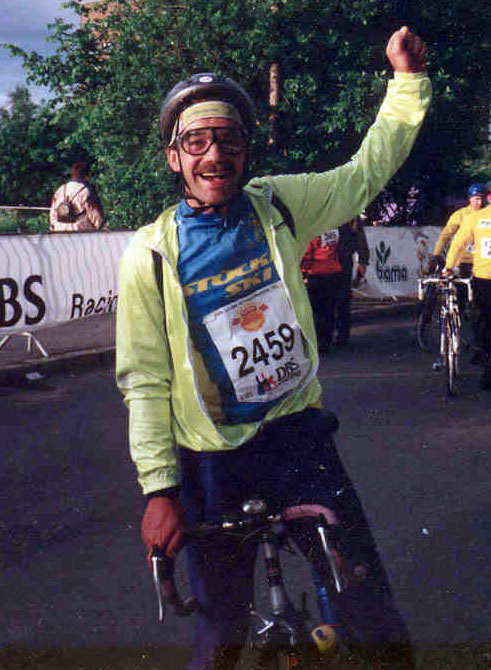
Cyclist after 540 km

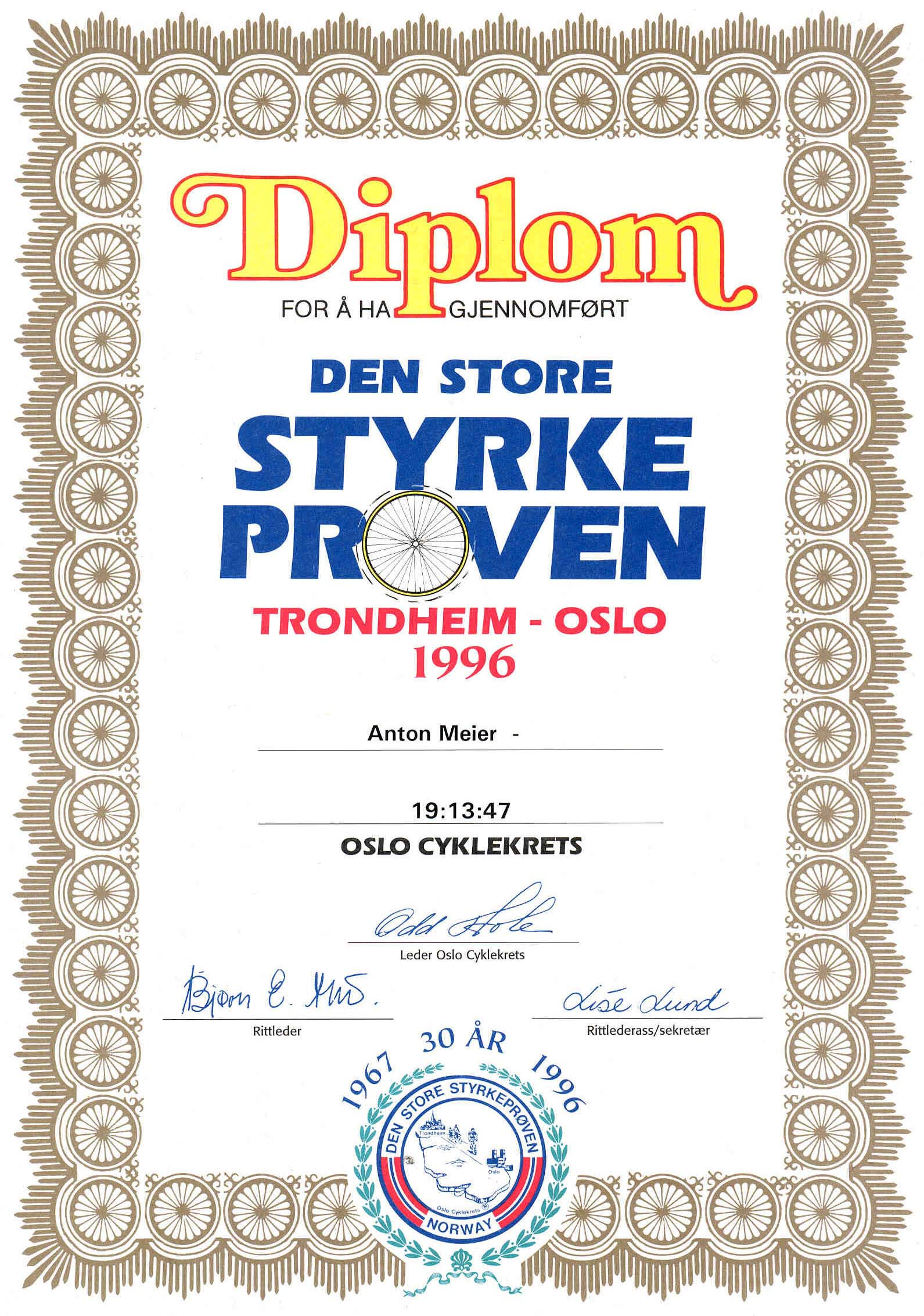
Diploma

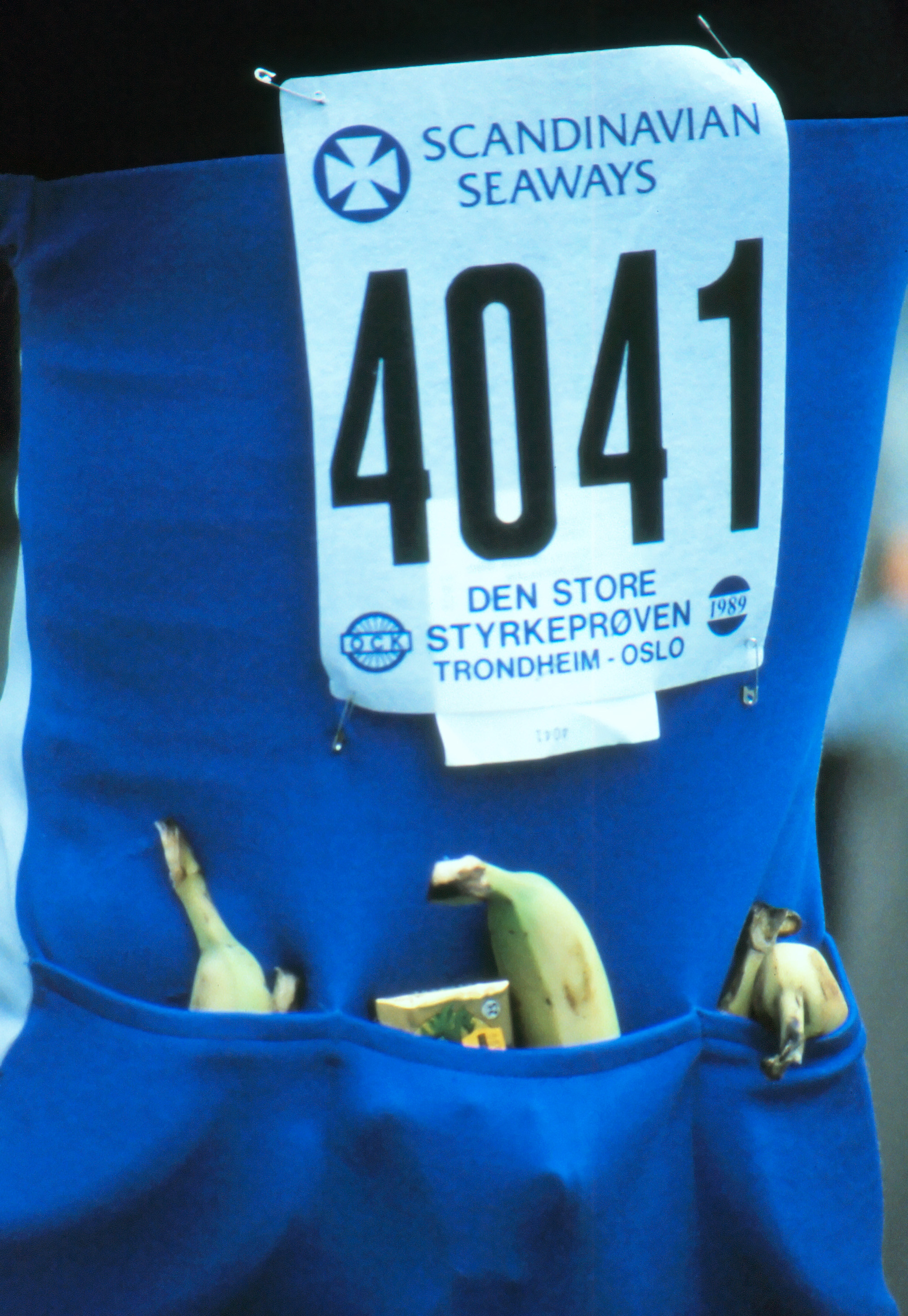
A participant at the start in Trondheim in 1989

Styrkeprøven, also called Den Store Styrkeprøven ('The Great Trial of Strength'), is a 540 km (340 mi) long bicycle cyclosportive which starts in Trondheim and finishes in Oslo, Norway. It was first held in 1967, initiated by Erik Gjems-Onstad and has taken place since then in late June every year.

In 2012 the record time was 12.51,02.

== Den Lille Styrkeprøven ==
Den Lille Styrkeprøven ('The Little Trial of Strength', 'Lille' is Norwegian for 'little' but the name is also a word-play on Lillehammer), which is 180 km (110 mi), from Lillehammer to Oslo, is also held at same time.

== 1997 recumbent ban controversy ==
In 1997, Bram Moens from the Netherlands rode his faired recumbent in the race, finishing at 13:46:08 – almost two hours ahead of the second rider, and setting a new course record. Bram Moens and his bike were cleared by the organizers to start, and recumbents had taken part many times before. Despite this, the record was not accepted by the organizers, and recumbent bicycles banned, both actions without claiming any rider misbehaviour.
