= Det grodde fram =

- Directed by: Lyder Selvig
- Written by: Lyder Selvig
- Starring: Torfinn Bjørnaas; Erik Gjems-Onstad; Lyder Selvig; Odd Sørli; Åsmund Wisløff; Anne Øverås; Jenny Friestad; Magne Nordnes
- Narrated by: Henry Røsoch
- Cinematography: Wilhelm Piro; Paul Berge; Per Usterud Aasgaard
- Music by: Anton Holme
- Release date: 6 October 1947
- Running time: 58 minutes
- Country: Norway
- Language: Norwegian

Det grodde fram – Trondheim 1940 – 1945 is a Norwegian documentary film from 1947 about the activities of the Norwegian resistance movement in Trøndelag during the occupation of Norway by Nazi Germany during the Second World War.

The film includes both material filmed during the war, and material filmed shortly after the war ended, and is similar to a newsreel. The film also includes reenactments by actual resistance members during the war such as Odd Sørli, Erik Gjems-Onstad and Torfinn Bjørnaas. The film has been re-released, and premiered again in Norwegian cinemas on 8 May 2018, in connection with the Norwegian Liberation Day.
