= Lark (Norwegian resistance) =

Lark was the code word for the group that was sent from the United Kingdom to Trondheim, Norway as part of the preparations for a possible Allied invasion of Norway. Lark developed into the main organisation for the Special Operations Executive (SOE) in Trøndelag, and became the effective leadership of Milorg in the region.

The plan for a possible Allied invasion in Norway was to split Norway in half around Nord-Trøndelag and southern Nordland, and thus isolate the German troops in the north (Operation Jupiter). Lark started its operations in Trøndelag on 10 February 1942, when Odd Sørli and Arthur Pevik came to Trondheim from the UK. The group's mission was to start training men in weapons and guerrilla tactics. Lark had been reinforced by Evald Hansen, Herluf Nygaard, Olav Krause Sættem and Arne Christiansen by April 1942, while Pevik went to London where he wrote an extensive report to Major Malcolm Munthe. Sættem, Christiansen, Hansen and Sørli went to Stockholm later the same year. During this time, Lark was mainly occupied with a plan to sink the German battleship Tirpitz, which at the time was situated in the Trondheimsfjord. Nygaard and Hansen were captured and tortured in December 1942; Nygaard later escaped, while Hansen died at Falstad.

Lark was reinforced by Erik Gjems-Onstad, Johnny Pevik and Nils Uhlin Hansen in March 1943. With the Allied invasion of Sicily in July 1943, it became clear that Norway would not be the scene of at least the primary Allied invasion of Europe. Lark continued to organise Milorg-groups, and planned offensives against Nazi collaborators.

== See also ==
- Norwegian Independent Company 1

== Bibliography ==
- Gjems-Onstad, Erik (1990). LARK: Milorg i Trøndelag 1940-1945. Stjørdal: Midt-Norge Forlag. ISBN 82-7358-017-2.
