= Torfinn Bjørnaas =

Norwegian resistance member (1914–2009)

Torfinn Bjørnaas, DCM (1 August 1914 – 15 September 2009) was a Norwegian resistance member.

He was born in Sulitjelma, but the family soon moved to Løkken Verk. He served his compulsory military service in His Majesty The King's Guard in 1936, and attended Trondheim Technical School and a Technische Hochschule in Germany. He visited Norway in the spring of 1940, and while he was here World War II reached Norway with the German invasion. Bjørnaas participated in the subsequent fighting to repel the invaders, but Norway capitulated. Bjørnaas tried to reach Northern Norway via Sweden, then England, but both to no avail. In the spring of 1941, Bjørnaas and others fled to England via India. He went through training for the Norwegian Independent Company 1 in England and Scotland, and was later dispatched to Norway to conduct sabotage. He was best known for the Thamshavn Line locomotive sabotage in 1943, but also had sabotage missions in Sulitjelma and Terningmoen. He is also known for missing an assassination attempt on Henrik Rogstad in 1945, an attempt to which the central leadership of Milorg had given the green light.

He was decorated with the War Cross with Sword, the St. Olav's Medal with Oak Branch, the Defence Medal 1940–1945, the Haakon VII 70th Anniversary Medal, as well as the British decorations Distinguished Conduct Medal, 1939–1945 Star, Defence Medal and War Medal.

In 1947 he starred as himself in the documentary film Det grodde fram. He was a member of the Linge Club, for Norwegian Independent Company 1 veterans. A square in Løkken Verk, Torfinn Bjørnaas' plass, has been named after him.

Bjørnaas spent his professional career in Orkla Grube Aktiebolag at Løkken Verk. He was active in the Home Guard, and was an active sport shooter in the National Rifle Association of Norway where he received the marksman medals Det frivillige Skyttervesens dugleiksmedalje and Den norske skyttermedalje. He died in September 2009.
