= Ranks and insignia of the Norwegian Armed Forces =

The ranks and insignia of the Norwegian Armed Forces were changed June 1, 2016, with the reintroduction of the Non-Commissioned Officer Corps, and the abolishment of the one-tier officer system in place since 1975.

== New system of 2023 ==
The Storting adopted in 2015 the new scheme for military personnel, Militærordningen. From 2016, the Norwegian Defence Forces have two career ladders for the military personnel; one officer scheme for personnel with a degree from the military academy, or a university degree and qualification courses, and a non-commissioned officer scheme for personnel with non-commissioned officer school. In 2023 the ranks of Korporal 1. klasse, Ledende konstabel, and Seniorspesialist were removed and the navy adopted new enlisted rank insignia.

=== Commissioned officers ===
The rank insignia of commissioned officers.

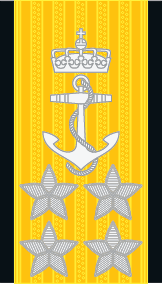
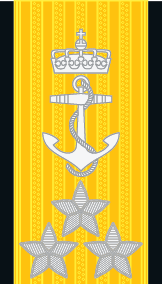
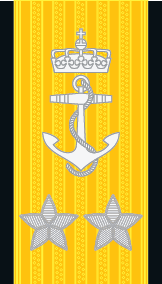
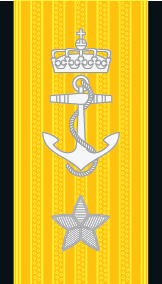
NATO code	OF-10	OF-9	OF-8	OF-7	OF-6	OF-5	OF-4	OF-3	OF-2	OF-1
Norwegian Army
Norwegian Army		General	Generalløytnant	Generalmajor	Brigader	Oberst	Oberstløytnant	Major	Kaptein/ Rittmester	Løytnant	Fenrik
Royal Norwegian Navy
Royal Norwegian Navy		Admiral	Viseadmiral	Kontreadmiral	Flaggkommandør	Kommandør	Kommandørkaptein	Orlogskaptein	Kapteinløytnant	Løytnant	Fenrik
Royal Norwegian Air Force
Royal Norwegian Air Force		General	Generalløytnant	Generalmajor	Brigader	Oberst	Oberstløytnant	Major	Kaptein	Løytnant	Fenrik
NATO code	OF-10	OF-9	OF-8	OF-7	OF-6	OF-5	OF-4	OF-3	OF-2	OF-1

==== Student officer ranks ====
NATO code	OF-1
Norwegian Army
Norwegian Army	Kadett i 3.avdeling	Kadett i 2. avdeling	Kadett i 1.avdeling	Kadett i KS Gjennomgående

=== Other ranks ===
The rank insignia of non-commissioned officers and enlisted personnel.

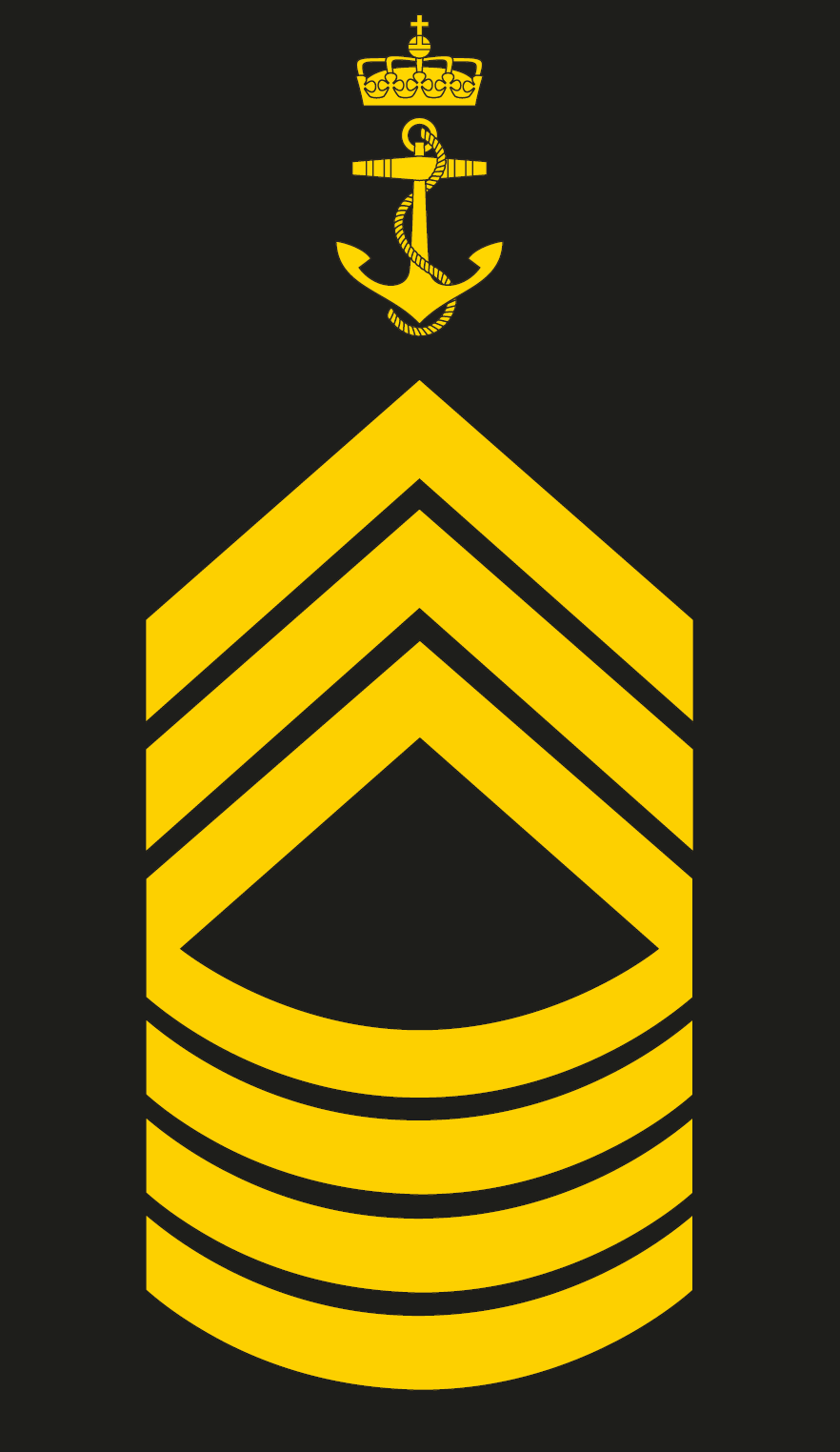
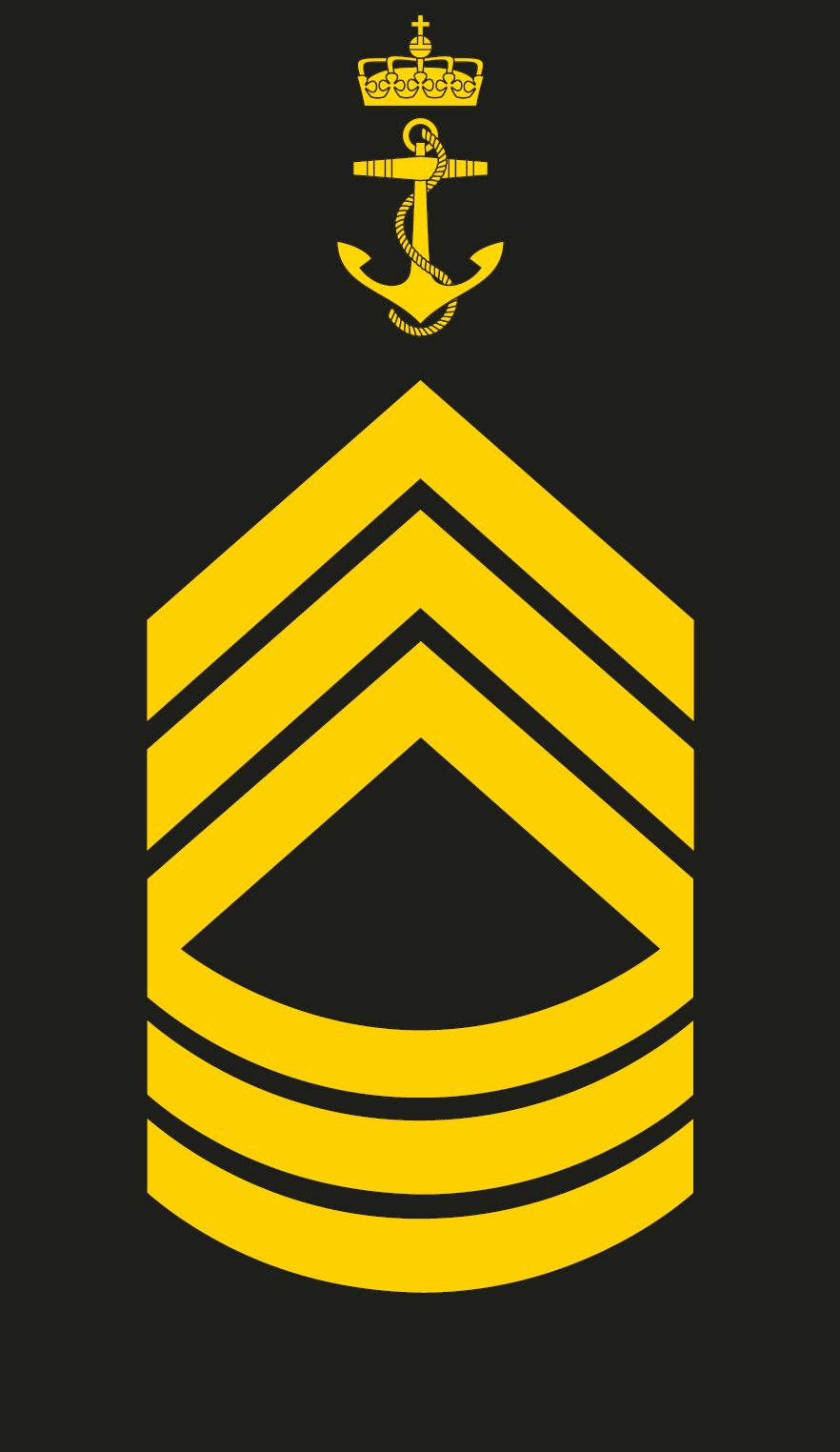
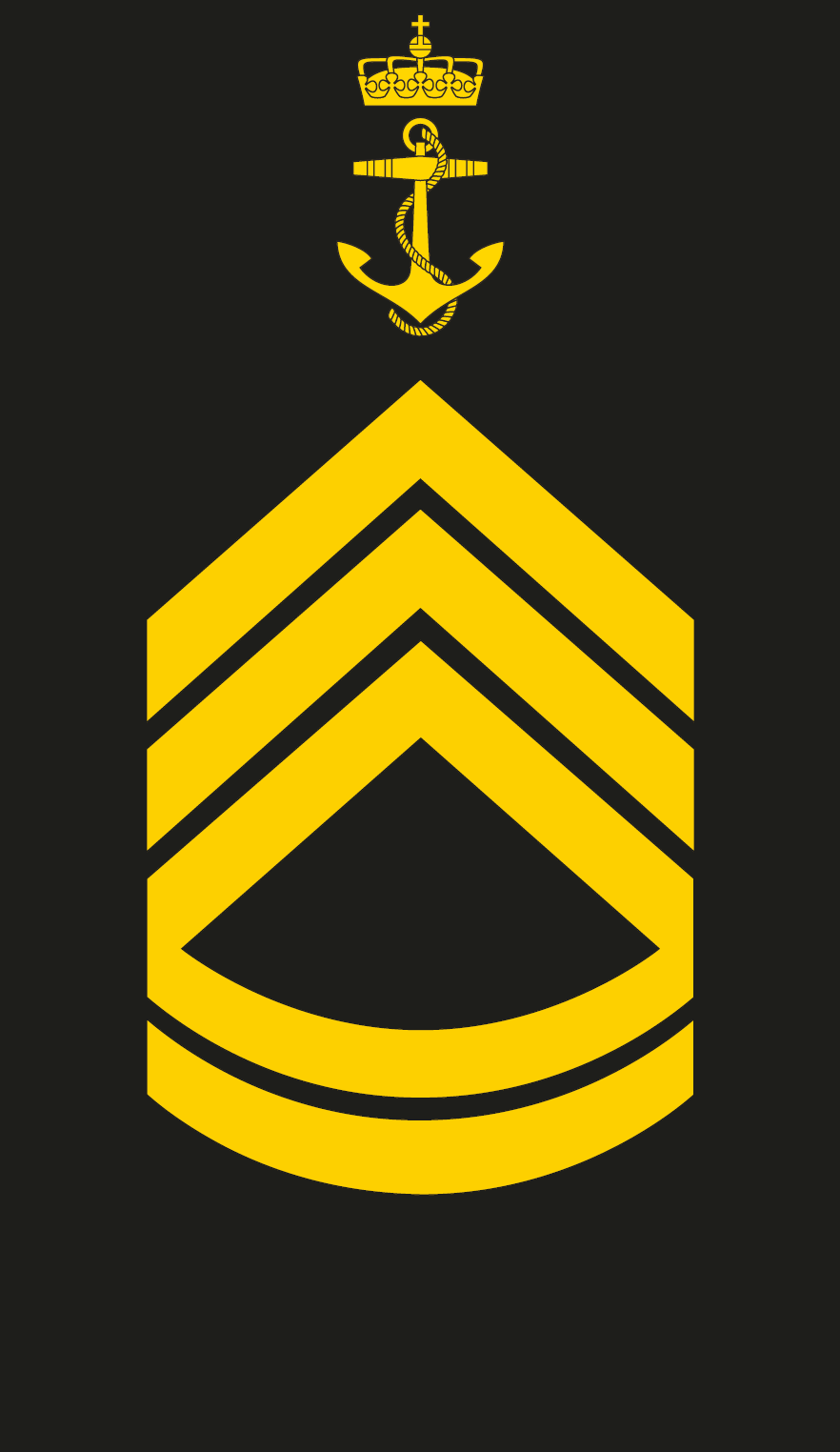
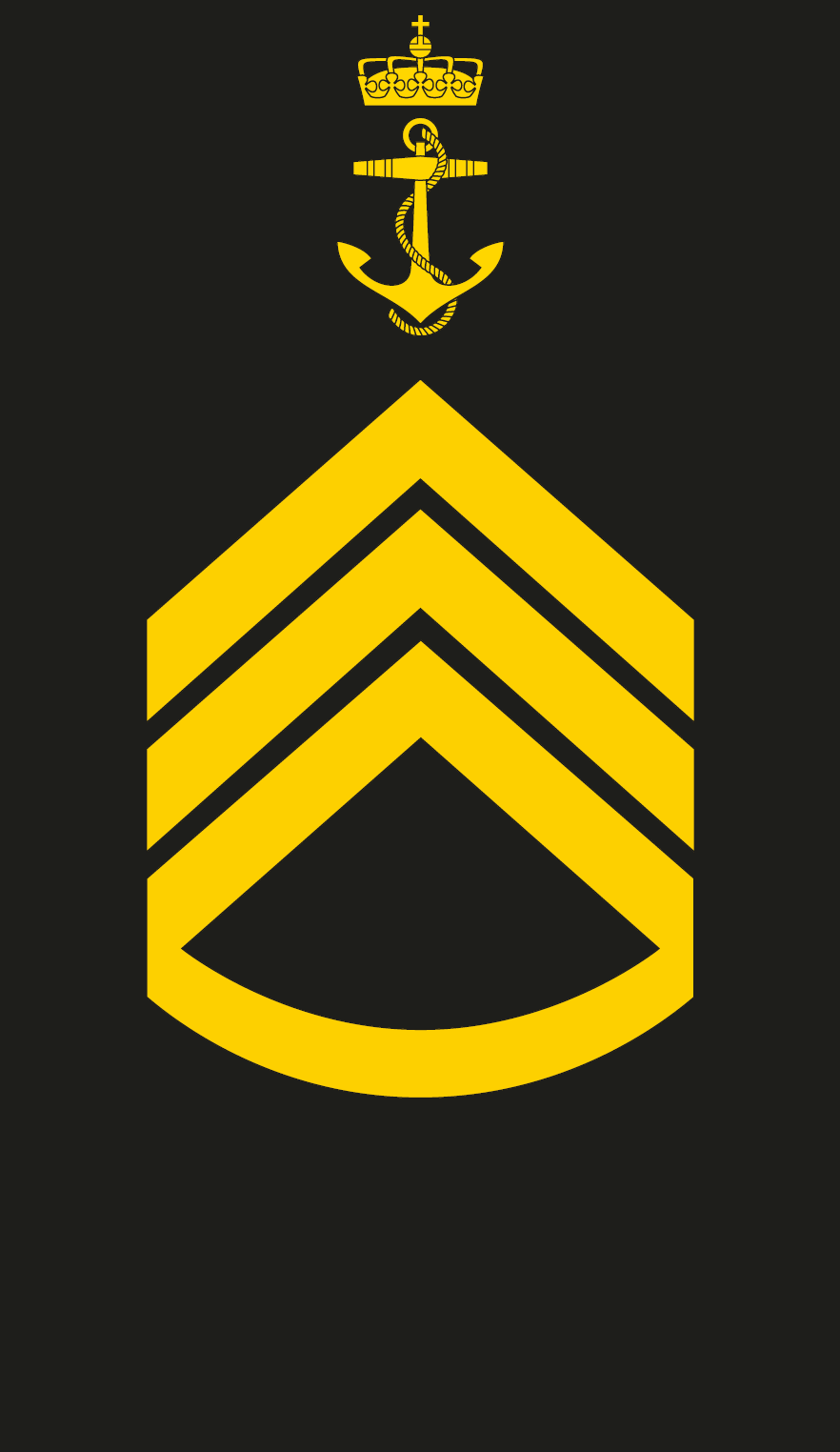
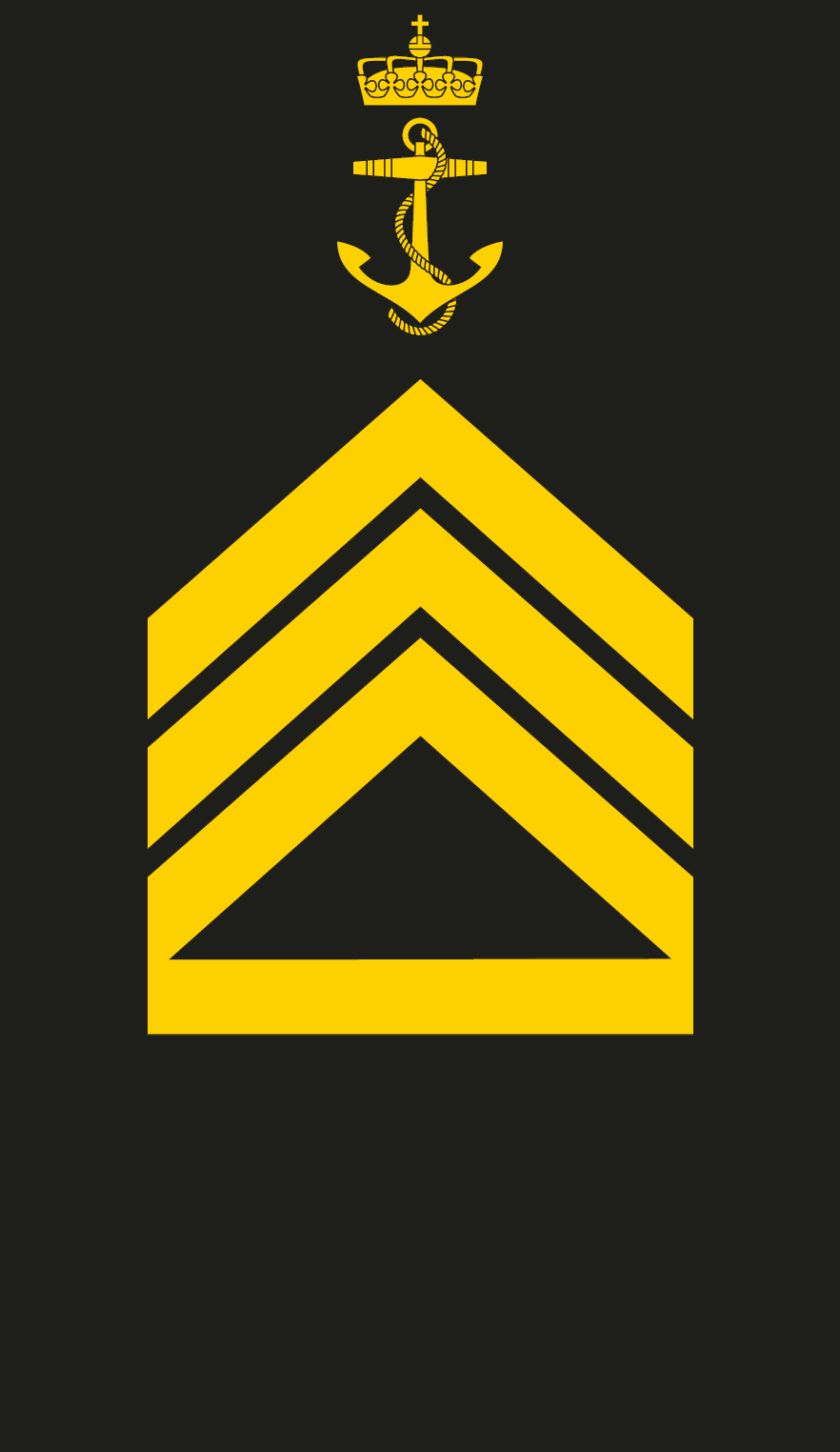
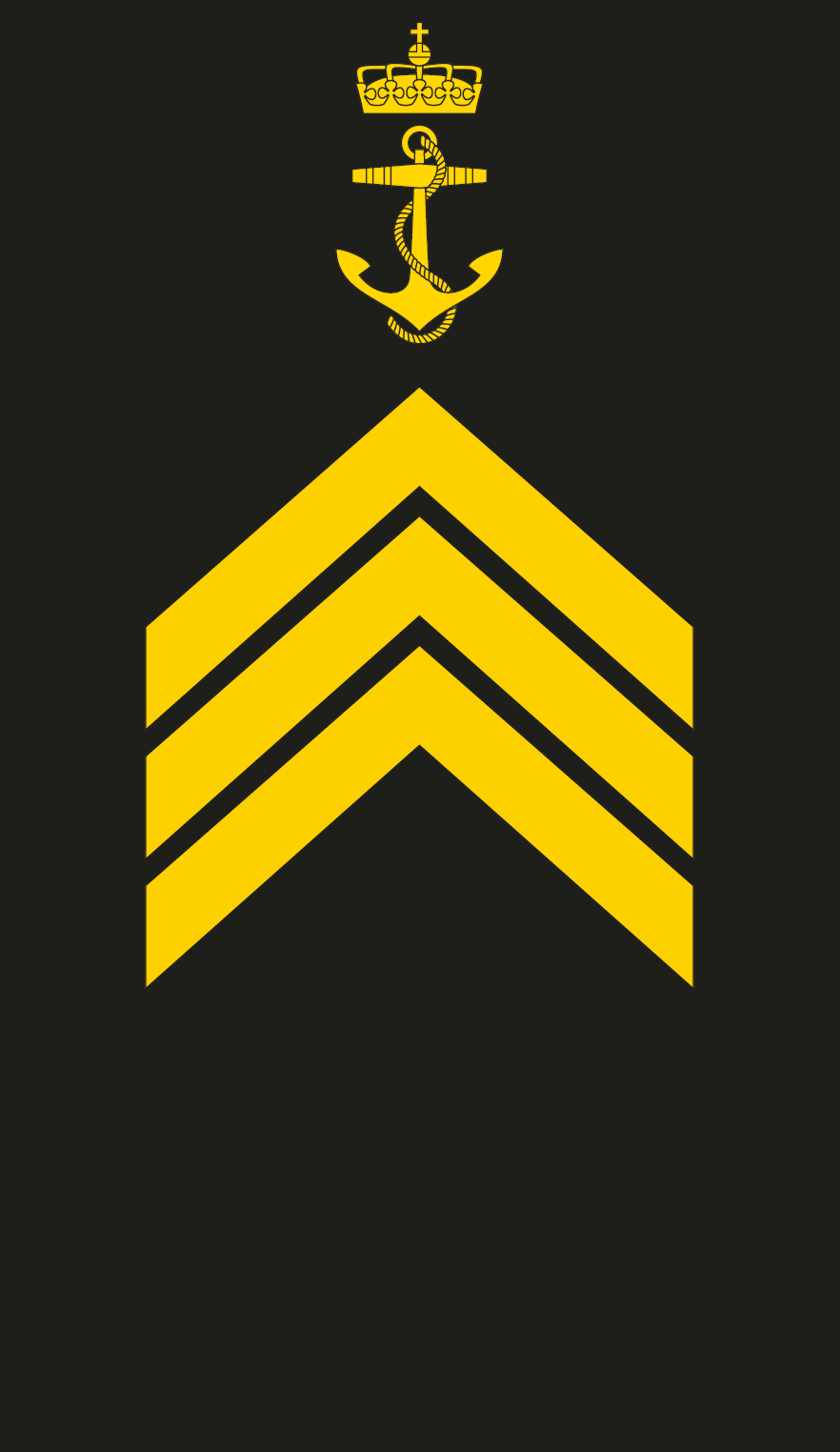
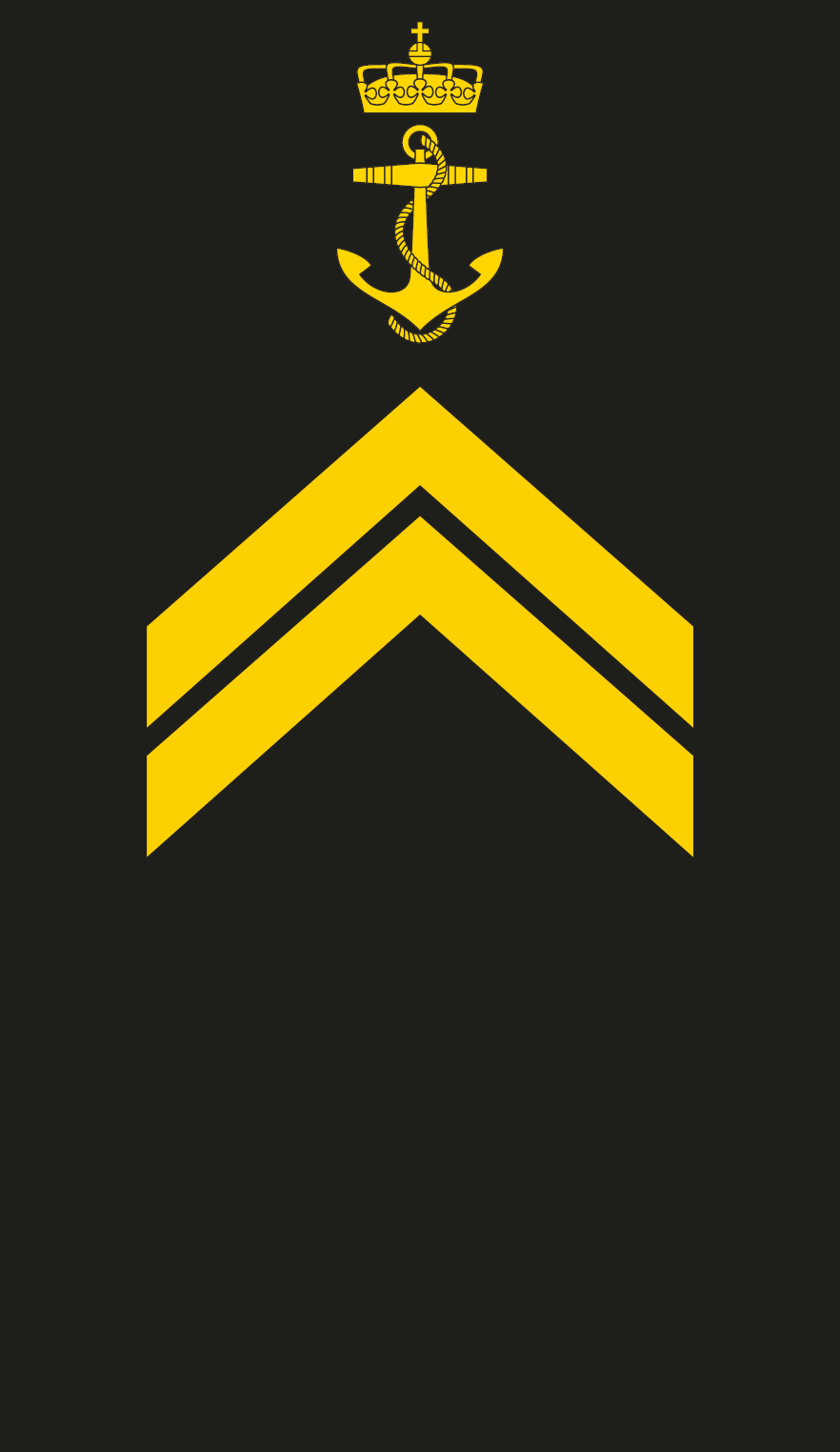
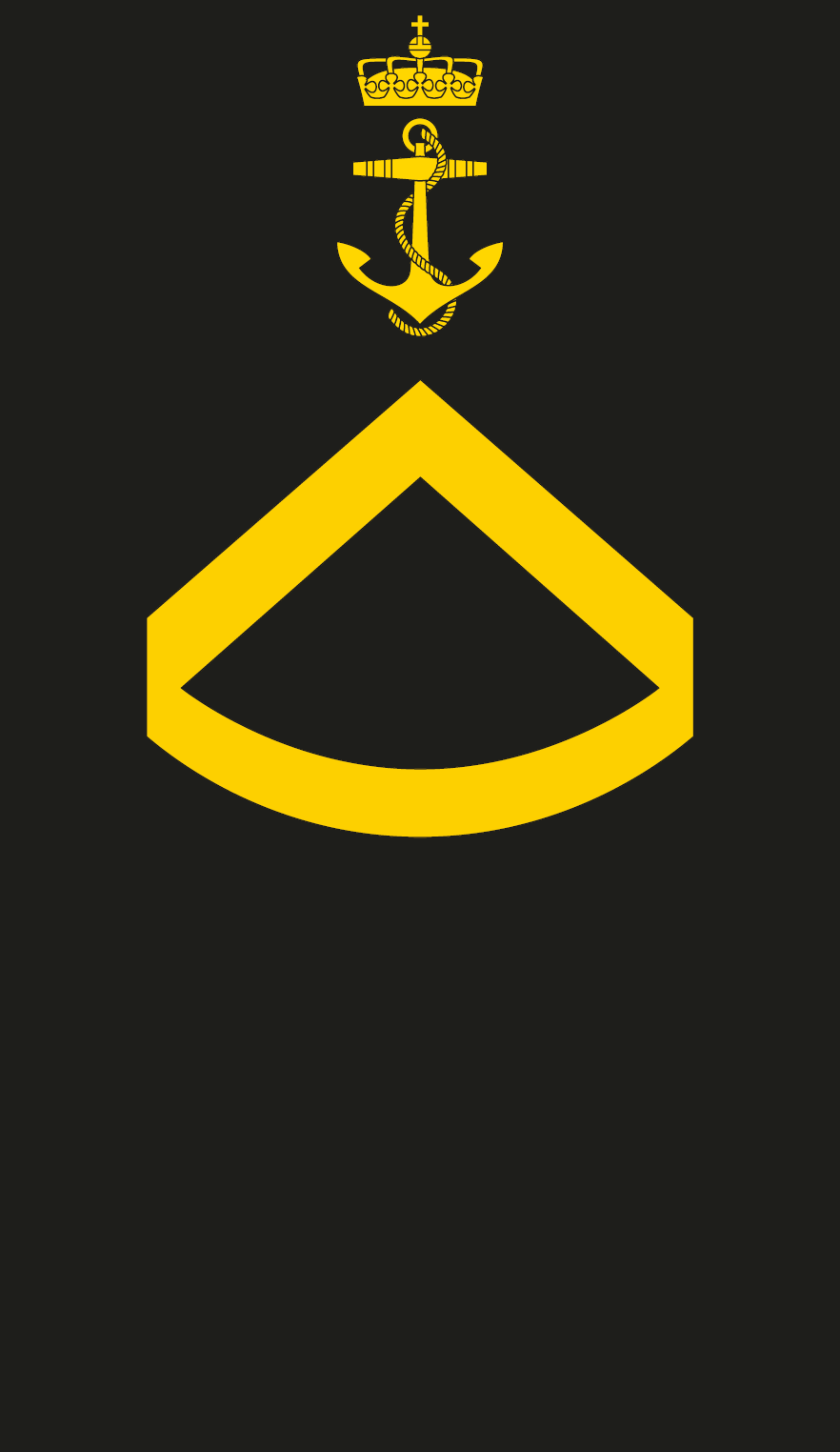
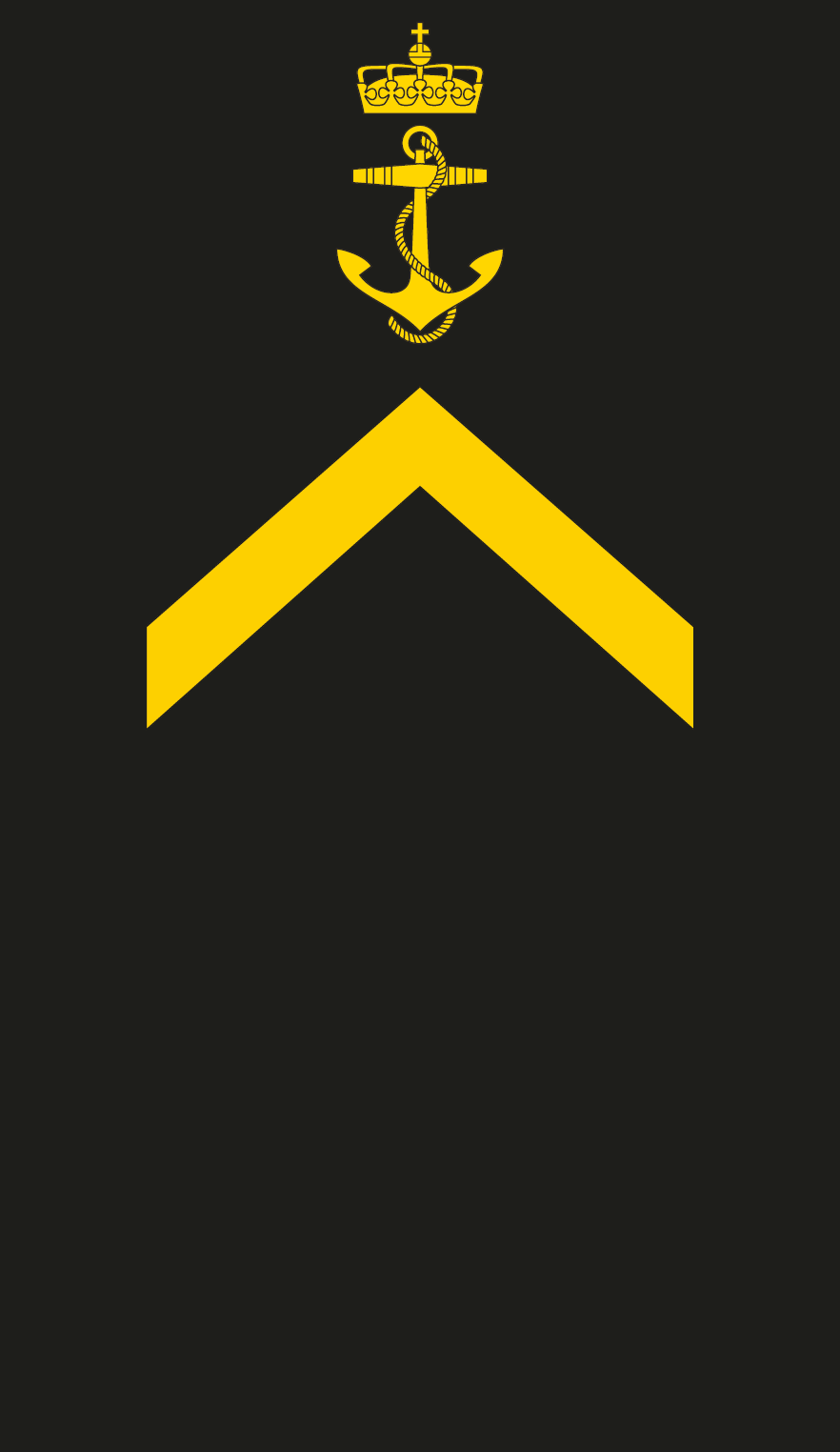
NATO code	OR-9	OR-8	OR-7	OR-6	OR-5		OR-4	OR-3	OR-2	OR-1
Norwegian Army
Norwegian Army	Sersjantmajor	Kommandérsersjant	Stabssersjant	Oversersjant	Sersjant 1. klasse	Sersjant	Korporal	Visekorporal 1. klasse	Visekorporal	Ledende menig	Menig
Royal Norwegian Navy
Royal Norwegian Navy	Flaggmester	Orlogsmester	Flotiljemester	Skvadronmester	Senior kvartermester	Kvartermester	Konstabel	Senior visekonstabel	Visekonstabel	Ledende menig	Menig
Royal Norwegian Air Force
Royal Norwegian Air Force	Sersjantmajor	Kommandérsersjant	Stabssersjant	Oversersjant	Vingsersjant	Sersjant	Ledende spesialist	Spesialist	Visespesialist	Ledende flysoldat	Flysoldat
NATO code	OR-9	OR-8	OR-7	OR-6	OR-5		OR-4	OR-3	OR-2	OR-1

==== Chief NCOs ====
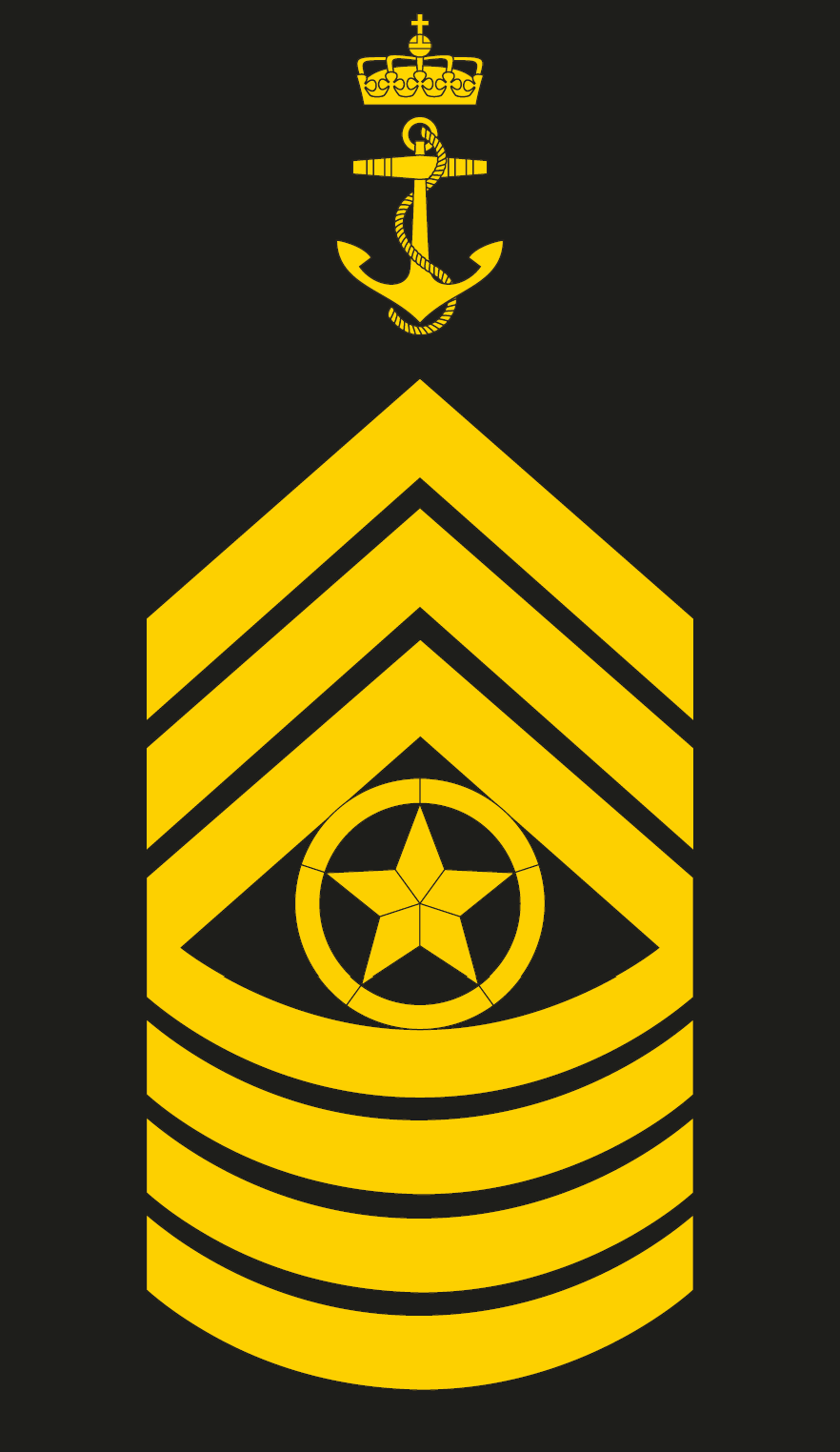
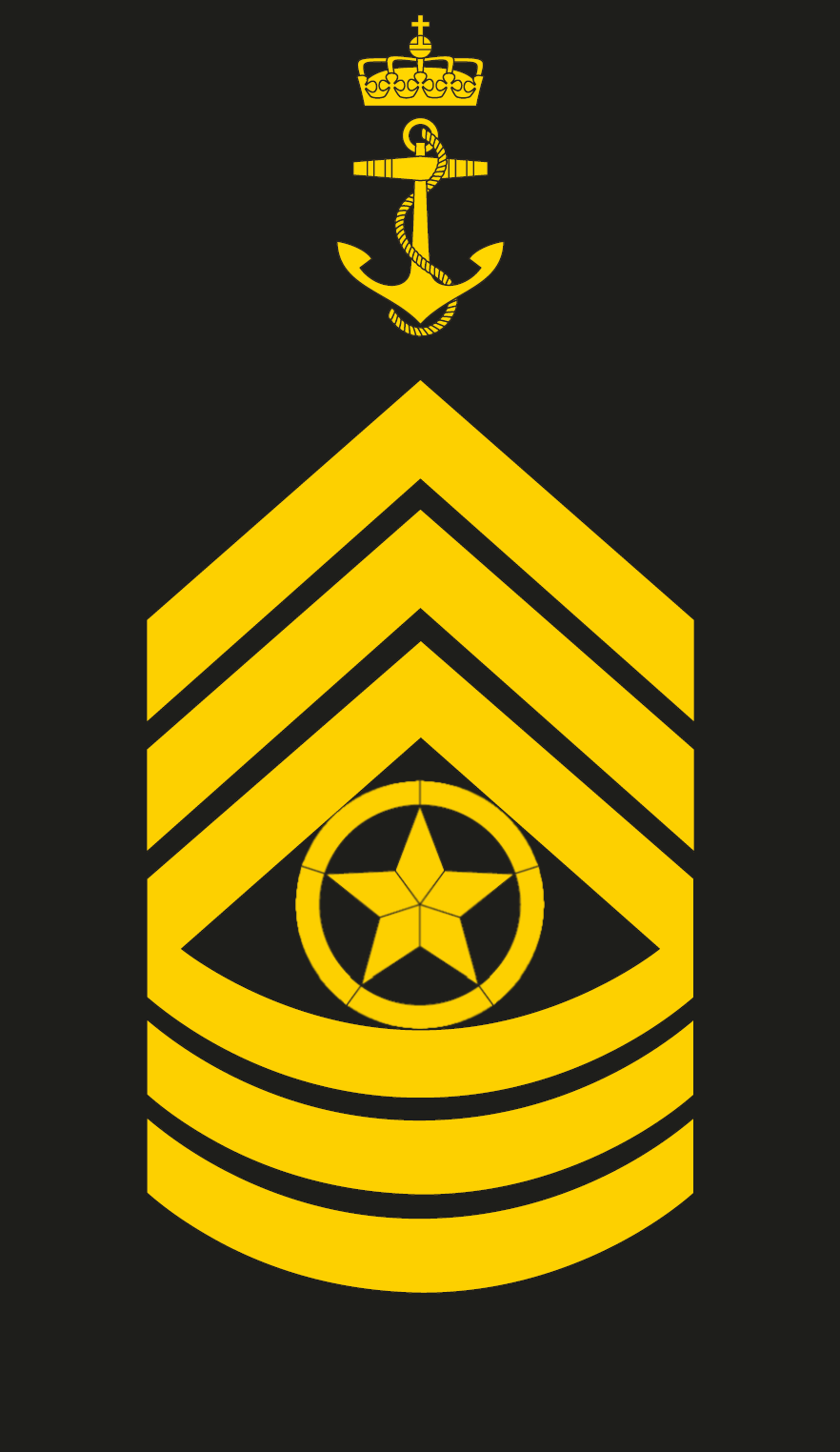
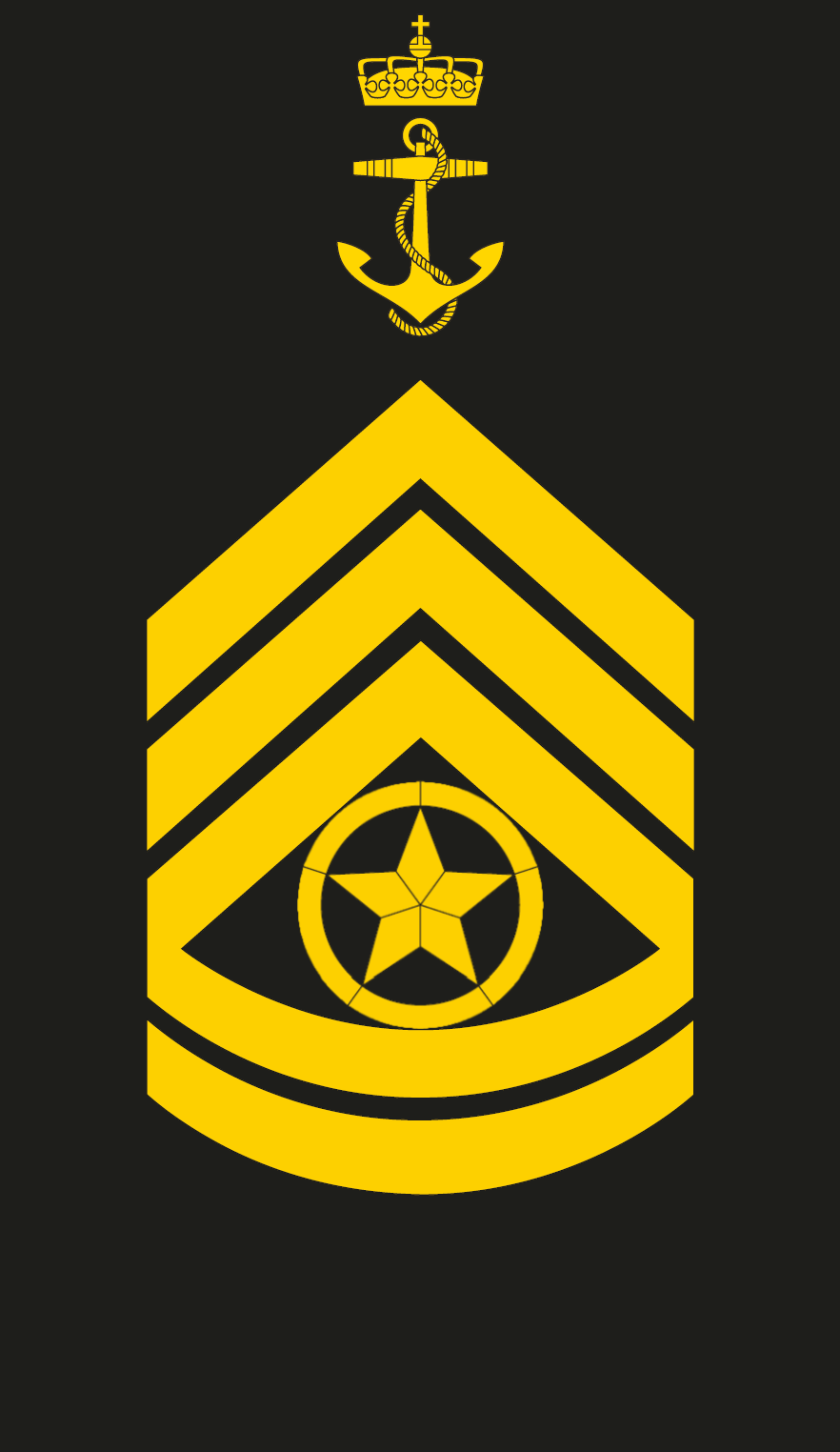
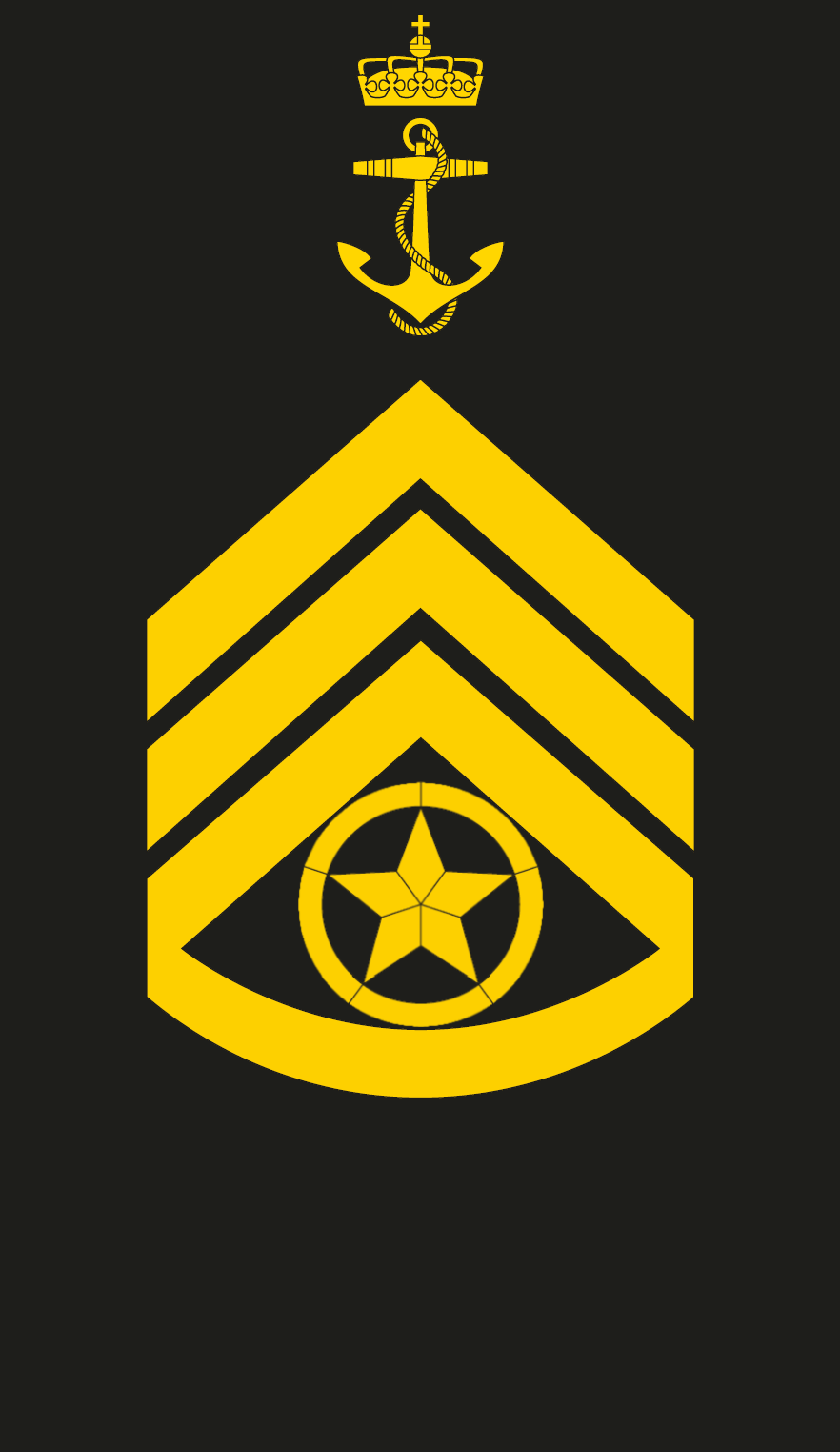
NATO code	OR-9	OR-8	OR-7	OR-6
Norwegian Army
Norwegian Army	Sersjantmajor	Kommandérsersjant	Stabssersjant	Oversersjant
Royal Norwegian Navy
Royal Norwegian Navy	Flaggmester	Orlogsmester	Flotiljemester	Skvadronmester
Royal Norwegian Air Force
Royal Norwegian Air Force	Sersjantmajor	Kommandérsersjant	Stabssersjant	Oversersjant

== Historic ranks ==
=== System 1916–1930 ===
==== Officers ====
Rank group	General / flag officers			Senior officers			Junior officers
Norwegian Army; Shoulder boards were only worn on the greatcoat.
Norwegian Army; Shoulder boards were only worn on the greatcoat.	General	Generalløjtnant	Generalmajor	Oberst	Oberstløitnant	Major	Kaptein/ Rittmester	Premierløitnant	Sekondløitnant
Royal Norwegian Navy
Royal Norwegian Navy	Admiral	Viseadmiral	Kontreadmiral	Kommandør	Kommandørkaptein	Kaptein	Kapteinløytnant	Premierløitnant	Sekondløitnant

==== Enlisted ====
Rank group	Non-commissioned officer				Enlisted
Norwegian Army							No insignia
Norwegian Army	Fanejunker	Kommandersersjant	Furer	Sersjant	Korporal		Menig
Royal Norwegian Navy
Royal Norwegian Navy	Underofficer 2den grad	Underofficer 3dje grad	Underofficer 4de grad	Underofficer 5te grad	Menig I klasse	Menig I klasse	Menig III klasse

=== System ?–1975 ===
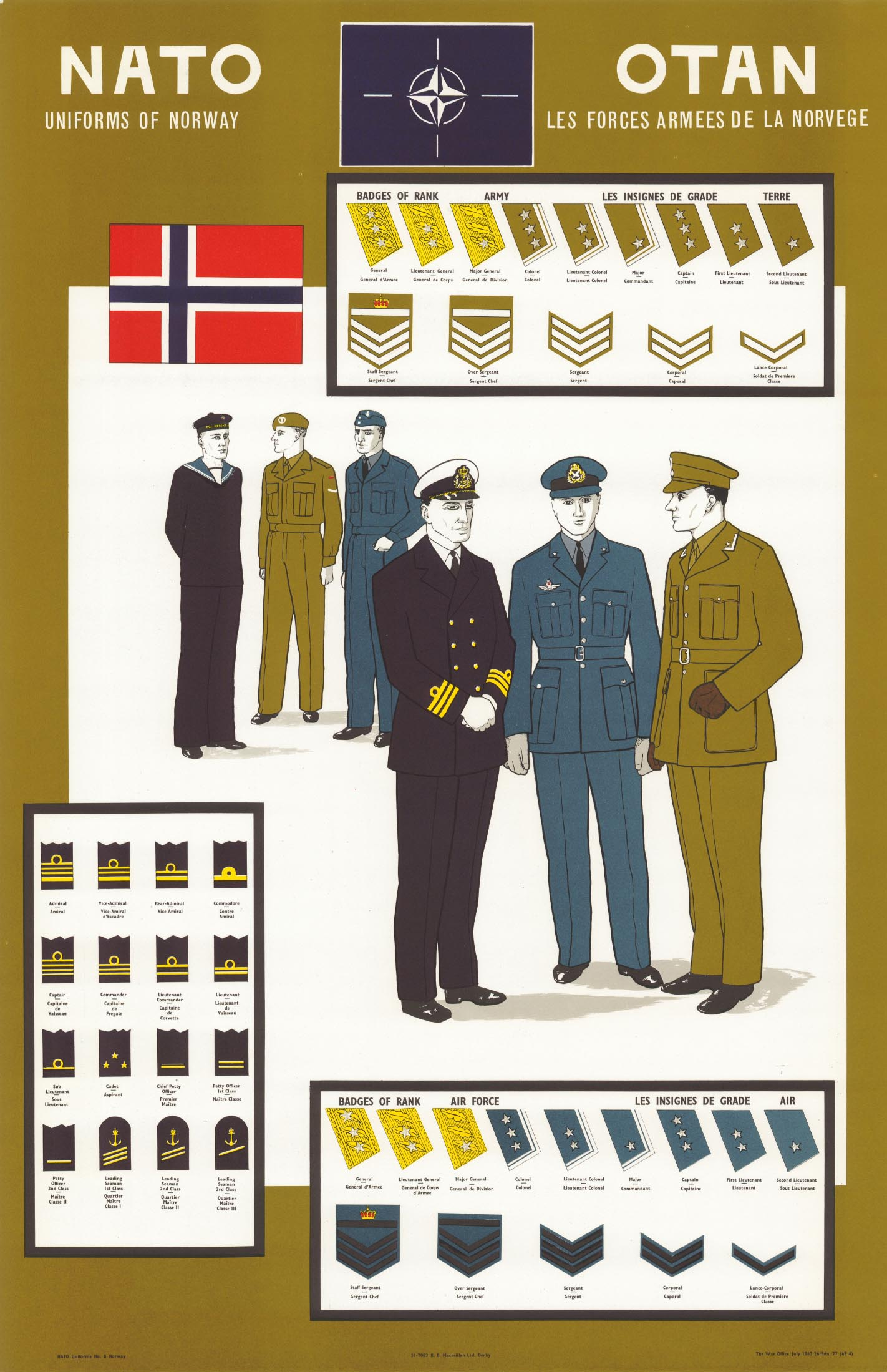
Norwegian ranks 1962.

==== Officers ====
Rank group	General / flag officers				Senior officers			Junior officers
(Norway) Army
(Norway) Army	General	Generalløjtnant	Generalmajor		Oberst	Oberstløitnant	Major	Kaptein/ Rittmester	Premierløitnant	Sekondløitnant
(Norway) Navy
(Norway) Navy	Admiral	Viseadmiral	Kontreadmiral	Kommandør		Kommandørkaptein	Kaptein		Premierløitnant	Sekondløitnant	Kadet

=== System 1975–2016 ===
Norway did not have a non-commissioned officer system and thus Sergeant and Petty officer are grouped with the officers under the common designation befal. The officers are divided into three groups: The befal (company officers, ranks Ensign to Captain inclusive), the staff officers (stabsoffiser, ranks Major to brigadier inclusive), and the generals (Major General to General inclusive).

Fenrik (Ensign) used to be referred to as Second Lieutenant (Norwegian: Fenrik), while the rank of lieutenant went by First Lieutenant. The rank of Brigadier is not an old tradition in the Norwegian armed forces and was instated as a replacement for Oberst I (First Colonel); what is now Oberst used to be Oberst II (Second Colonel). As shown, the Cavalry have two ranks which differ from the regular Army: Dragon (Dragoon) instead of Menig (Private), and Rittmester (Rittmeister) instead of Kaptein (Captain).

The ranks of Grenader and Matros were bestowed upon soldiers who have finished the 12 months compulsory service and had signed one or more three-year contracts to continue serving. The ranks of Visekorporal/Visekonstabel/Vingsoldat (Corporal/Leading Rate) were usually ascribed to soldiers with long and/or outstanding service, though may be bestowed on soldiers with extra responsibilities (e.g. the shift-commander among a group of soldiers on guard-duty). A UB-Korporal/Kvartermesteraspirant (Rate Corporal/Petty Officer-in-training) was a soldier who has finished the UB course (Utskrevet Befalskurs), a course intended to prepare conscripted soldiers for non-commissioned officer duties, but still under training in "the field". After one-year course and service these soldiers were qualified for the rank of Sersjant or Kvartermester.

==== Officers ====
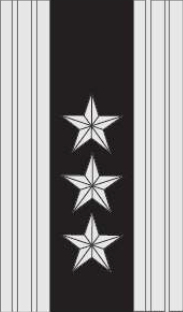
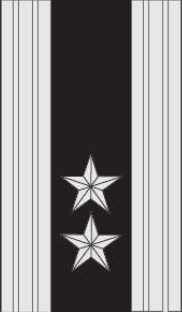
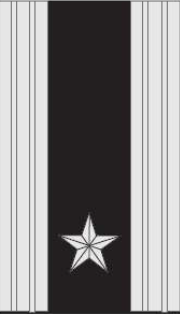
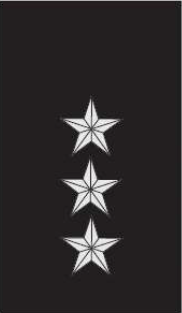
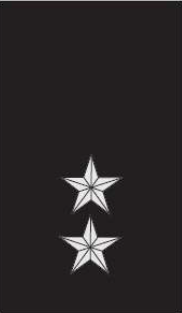
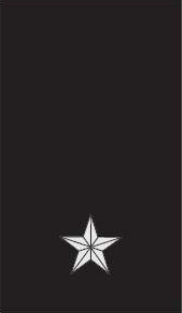
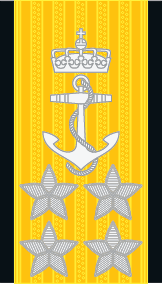
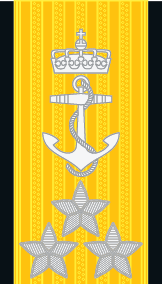
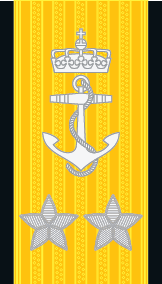
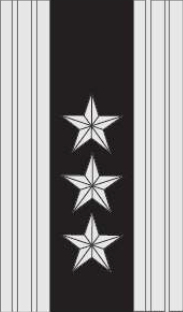
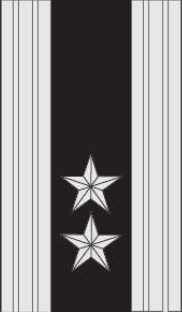
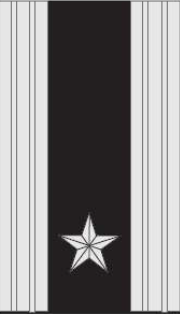
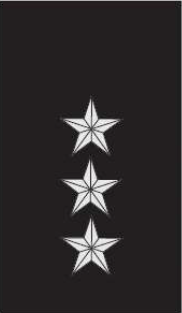
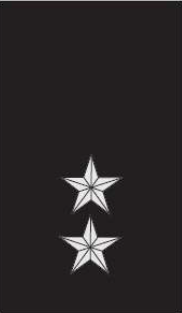
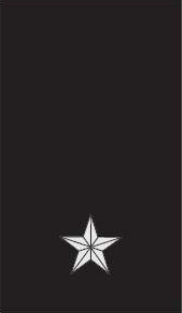
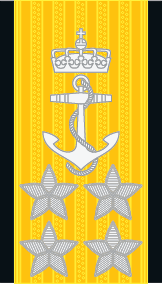
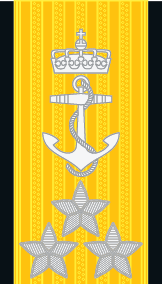
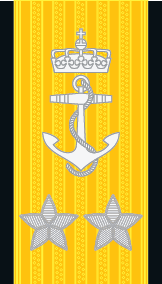
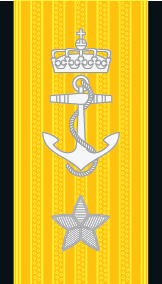
NATO code	OF-10	OF-9	OF-8	OF-7	OF-6	OF-5		OF-4	OF-3	OF-2	OF-1
(Norway) Army & Air force (1975–1997)
(Norway) Army & Air force (1975–1997)		General	Generalløytnant	Generalmajor		Oberst I	Oberst II	Oberstløytnant	Major	Kaptein/ Rittmester	Løytnant	Fenrik
(Norway) Navy (1975–1997)
(Norway) Navy (1975–1997)		Admiral	Viseadmiral	Kontreadmiral		Kommandør I	Kommandør II	Kommandørkaptein	Orlogskaptein	Kapteinløytnant	Løytnant	Fenrik
(Norway) Army & Air force (1997–2016)
(Norway) Army & Air force (1997–2016)		General	Generalløytnant	Generalmajor	Brigader	Oberst		Oberstløytnant	Major	Kaptein/ Rittmester	Løytnant	Fenrik
(Norway) Navy (1997–2016)
(Norway) Navy (1997–2016)		Admiral	Viseadmiral	Kontreadmiral	Flaggkommandør	Kommandør		Kommandørkaptein	Orlogskaptein	Kapteinløytnant	Løytnant	Fenrik

==== Enlisted ====
The rank insignia for enlisted for the army, navy and air force respectively.

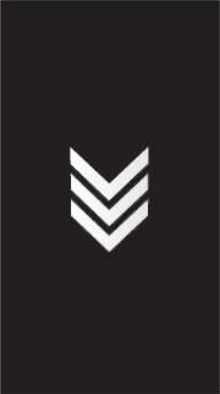
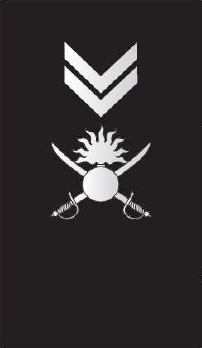
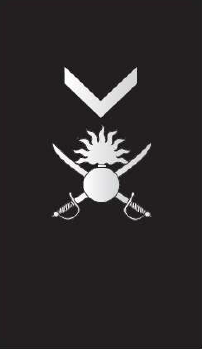
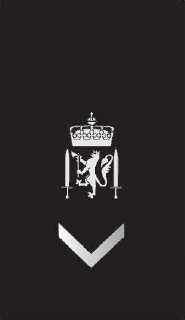
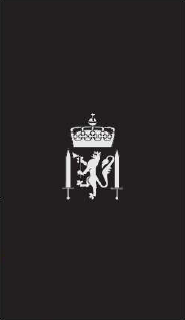
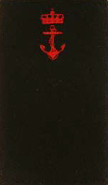
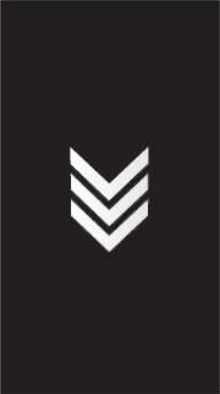
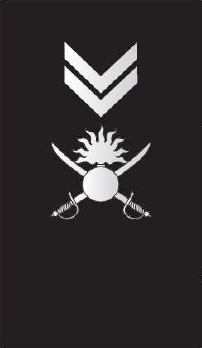
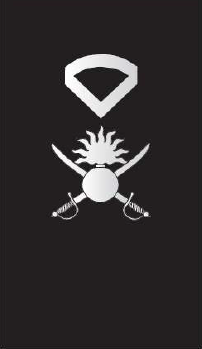
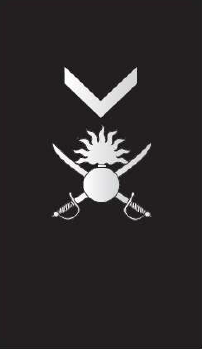
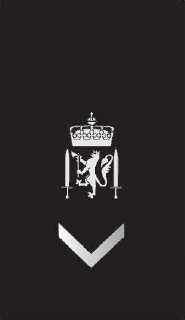
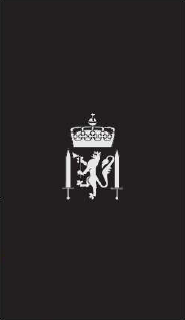
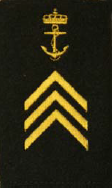
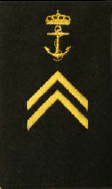
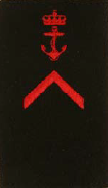
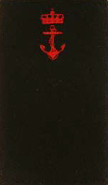
NATO code	OR-9	OR-8	OR-7	OR-6	OR-5		OR-4	OR-3	OR-2		OR-1
Norwegian Army (c. 1988)
Norwegian Army (c. 1988)					Sersjant		Korporal		Visekorporal		Menig
Royal Norwegian Navy (c. 1988)
Royal Norwegian Navy (c. 1988)				Flaggkvartermester	Kvartermester I Klasse	Kvartermester	Konstabel I Klasse		Konstabel II Klasse	Konstabel III Klasse	Menig
Royal Norwegian Air Force (c. 1988)
Royal Norwegian Air Force (c. 1988)					Sersjant		Korporal		Vingsoldat		Flysoldat
Norwegian Army (–2016)
Norwegian Army (–2016)					Sersjant		Korporal	Visekorporal 1. klasse	Visekorporal		Menig
Royal Norwegian Navy (–2016)
Royal Norwegian Navy (–2016)					Kvartermester		Konstabel		Visekonstabel		Menig
Royal Norwegian Air Force (–2016)
Royal Norwegian Air Force (–2016)					Sersjant		Korporal	Visekorporal 1. klasse	Visekorporal		Flysoldat

=== System 2016–2023 ===
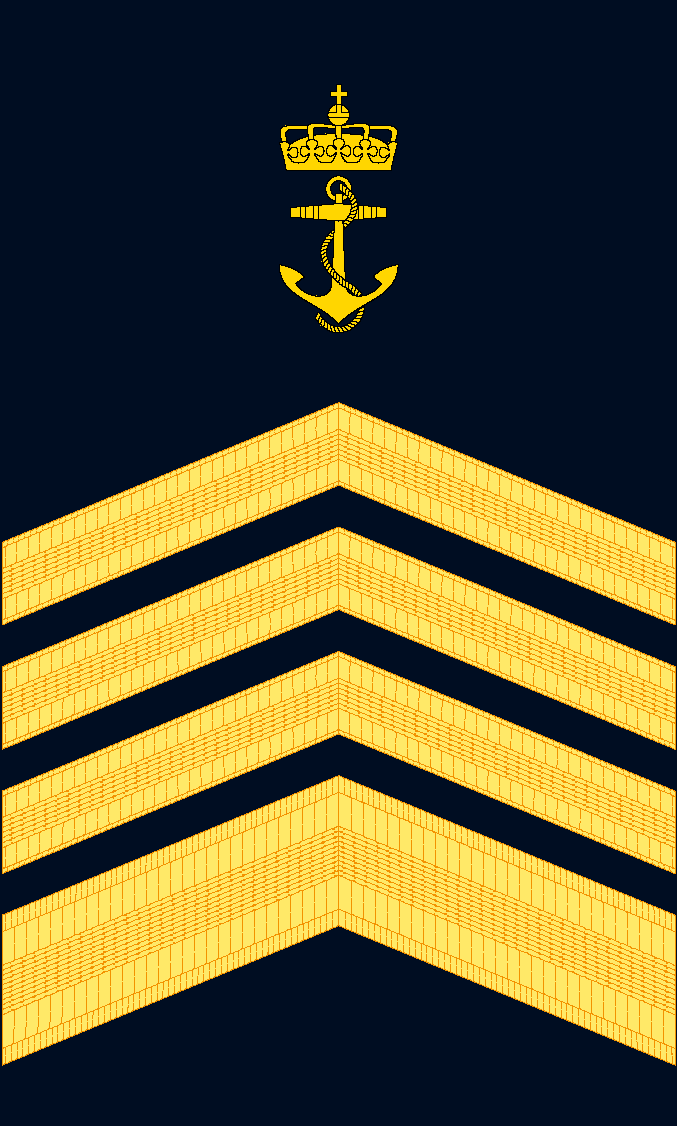
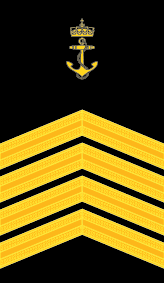
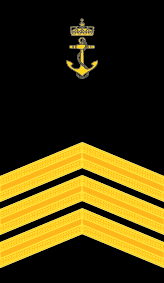
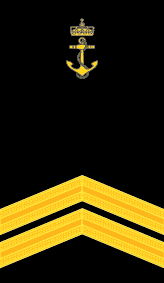
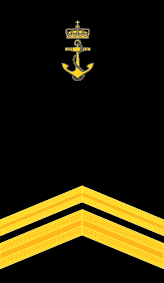
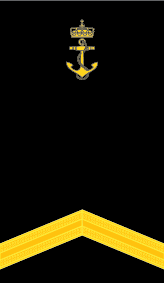
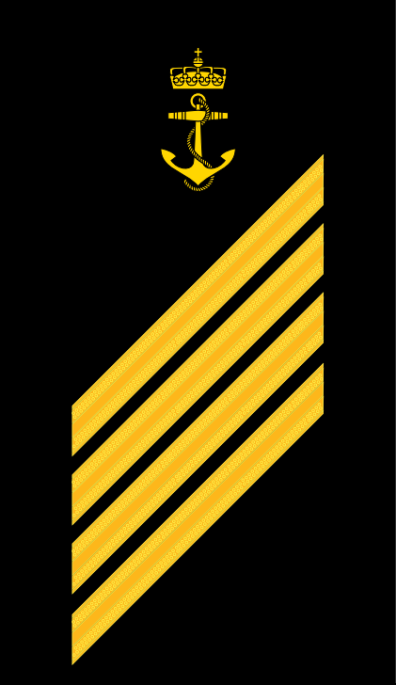
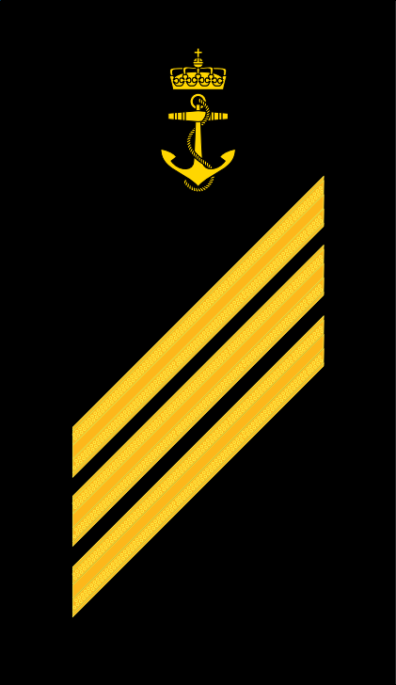
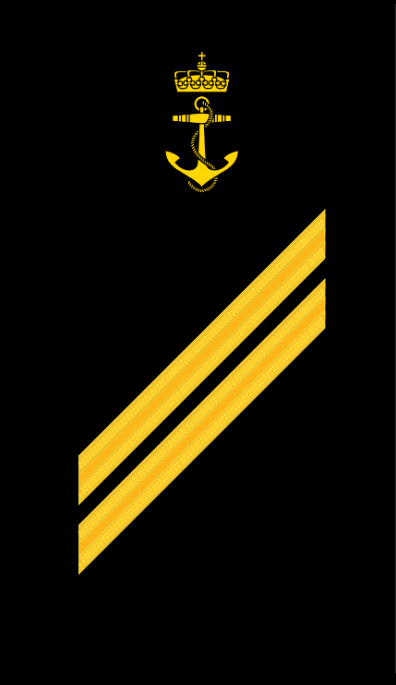
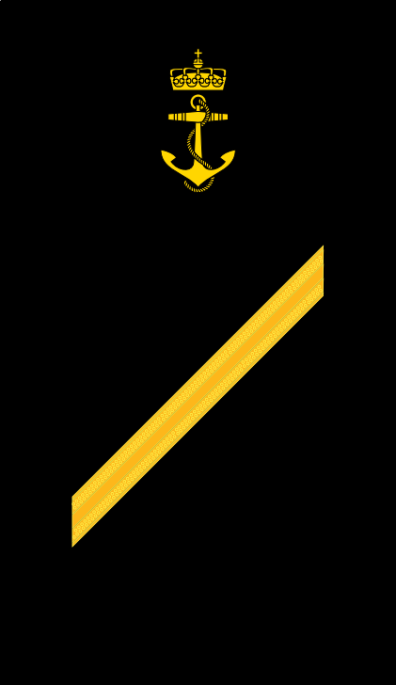
NATO code	OR-9	OR-8	OR-7	OR-6	OR-5		OR-4		OR-3	OR-2	OR-1
Norwegian Army
Norwegian Army	Sersjantmajor	Kommandérsersjant	Stabssersjant	Oversersjant	Sersjant 1. klasse	Sersjant	Korporal 1. klasse	Korporal	Visekorporal 1. klasse	Visekorporal	Ledende menig	Menig
Royal Norwegian Navy
Royal Norwegian Navy	Flaggmester	Orlogsmester	Flotiljemester	Skvadronmester	Senior kvartermester	Kvartermester	Ledende konstabel	Konstabel	Senior visekonstabel	Visekonstabel	Ledende menig	Menig
Royal Norwegian Air Force
Royal Norwegian Air Force	Sersjantmajor	Kommandérsersjant	Stabssersjant	Oversersjant	Vingsersjant	Sersjant	Seniorspesialist	Ledende spesialist	Spesialist	Visespesialist	Ledende flysoldat	Flysoldat
