= Knut Alming =

Norwegian engineer (1917–2002)

- Born: 1 July 1917; Ås, Norway
- Died: 6 January 2002 (aged 84)
- Education: Norwegian Institute of Technology
- Occupation: Engineer
- Employer: Norwegian Institute of Technology

Knut Alming (1 July 1917 – 6 January 2002) was a Norwegian engineer, and a professor in hydropower technology, whose research centered on flow theory and of turbine theory and construction.

== Personal life ==
Alming was born in Ås on 1 July 1917. He was the son of Einar Alming and Marie Rusletvedt, and married Margaret Cadell in 1944.

== Second World War ==
While a student in Trondheim during the German occupation of Norway, Alming took part in resistance activities for the Trondheim chapter of the intelligence organization XU. In October 1942, while his flat was searched by the Gestapo, knowing that there was compromising material in the flat such as a gun, intelligence reports and unexposed film, he managed to escape and eventually fled to Sweden. From 1942 to 1945 he served as intelligence officer at the Norwegian High Command in exile in London.

== Career ==
Alming graduated from the Norwegian Institute of Technology in 1946, and later made further studies in aerodynamics in California and England. He was appointed professor in hydropower technology at the Norwegian Institute of Technology from 1952. His research publications have centered on flow theory, and turbine theory and construction.
