= Islamophobia in the media =

Islamophobia in the media refers to negative coverage of Islam-related topics, Muslims, or Arabs by media outlets in a way that is hostile, untrue, and/or misleading. Islamophobia is defined as "Intense dislike or fear of Islam, especially as a political force; hostility or prejudice towards Muslims", and the study of how and to what extent the media furthers Islamophobia has been the subject of much academic and political discussion.

Discussion of Islamophobia in the media is typically concerned with patterns of rhetoric employed either by a specific outlet or by the mass media of a particular country or area, such as the United States or Europe. Examples of this include disproportionate negative coverage of Islam compared to other religions, association of all Muslims with terrorism, portrayal of Islam and its adherents as violent or primitive, and exclusion of Muslim perspectives from political and academic discussion, among other topics. In turn, responses to discussions of media Islamophobia often question the frequency, severity, and impact of rhetoric deemed Islamophobic, what constitutes Islamophobia in practice, and the political motivations behind discussions about Islamophobia.

== Historical context ==
Some researchers point to the Iranian Revolution in 1979 as a starting point for Islamophobia in the United States. It may be due to the growing influence of political Islam around the same period. In his book, The Modern Middle East, author Mehran Kamrava notes that the "rise in the popularity and spread of political Islam can be traced to the 1980s and even earlier, when a general trend in the politicization of Islam began sweeping across the Middle East following the Arab 'victory' in the 1973 War and the success of the Iranian revolution." Others find Islamophobia present in the United States far earlier. Some also believe that the phenomenon of Islamophobia is a psychological defense mechanism, which is spreading through mass media like a virus. Regardless, negative media images of Muslims in the 1980s and 1990s were compounded by reporting on Islam and Muslims that relied on Samuel Huntington's 1993 idea of a "clash of civilizations" for their framework; one that "the American media were all too ready to embrace after the fall of Communism in the late 1990s."

== Islamophobia in the media ==
According to Nathan Lean, editor-in-chief of Aslan Media and a researcher at Georgetown University, the media plays a major role in promoting Islamophobia across the world. According to Elizabeth Poole in the Encyclopedia of Race and Ethnic Studies, the media has been criticized for perpetrating Islamophobia. She cites a case study examining a sample of articles in the British press from between 1994 and 2000, which concluded that Muslim viewpoints were underrepresented and that issues involving Muslims usually depicted them in a negative light. Such portrayals, according to Poole, include the depiction of Islam and Muslims as a threat to Western security and values. Benn and Jawad write that hostility towards Islam and Muslims are "closely linked to media portrayals of Islam as barbaric, irrational, primitive and sexist."

There have been various instances in the media about how the Muslim community are often misrepresented to society, mostly in a way that centers heavily on terrorism, and paints Islam with a very broad brush. A 2011 study claims this is something that is seen in two major magazines, Newsweek and Time, which have been covering relations between the U.S. and Afghanistan over the previous decade. Both of these publications distributed twenty leading articles that depicted about 57% of negative coverage in regards to current events in Afghanistan, about 37% neutral coverage, and only around 6% was positive information. This negative content would often consist of excessive mentioning of Al-Qaeda and the Taliban, mistreatment of women, the recruitment of terrorists, etc. Numerous studies confirmed that the frequent repetition of a fact people might be convinced of it even if it is wrong, and this is called Illusory truth effect.

A 2014 study has shown that over three-quarters of people in Western societies rely on the mass media, mainly television, as their primary source of information about Islam and Muslims.

In 2018, The Washington Post completed a study to examine newspapers’ coverage of Muslims compared to Catholics, Jews, and Hindus. The study first established a baseline for neutrality by analyzing 48,000 newspapers from various US newspapers between 1996 and 2015. Next the study analyzed 850,000 articles of which about 28% mentioned “Muslim” or “Islam”, about 41% that mentioned “Catholic”, about 29% that mentioned “Jew”, and about 2% that mentioned “Hindu”. This study found that 78% of all the articles that mentioned “Muslim” or “Islam” were negative in comparison ”with only 40 percent of those about Catholics, 46 percent about Jews, and 49 percent about Hindus.” The study further filtered the content by cross referencing with articles that included “terrorism,” “extremism,” “radicalism,” “fundamentalism,” or “fanaticism,” “or their variants”. This revealed articles that contain terrorism and extremism words are more negative than those that do not. However, 69% of articles that do not contain references to terrorism and extremism were still negative. When the study removed articles with a mention of a foreign country “54 percent are negative, compared with only 37 percent of articles about Catholics, 36 percent of articles about Jews, and only 29 percent of articles about Hindus under similar conditions”.

British scholars Egorova and Tudor cite European researchers in suggesting that expressions used in the media such as "Islamic terrorism", "Islamic bombs" and "violent Islam" while not using the same terms relating to non-Muslims have resulted in a negative perception of Islam.

There have also been examples in the film industry in which Muslims are often associated with terrorism, such as in the 1998 movie The Siege. Some critics of this movie have stated that the manner in which Islam is portrayed in this film only furthers the stereotype that Muslims in are correlated with terrorism and savagery.

=== United States ===
According to a 2021 analysis, media "coverage of Muslims is strikingly negative by every comparative measure examined. Muslim articles are negative relative to those touching on Catholics, Jews, or Hindus, and to those mentioning marginalized groups within the United States as diverse as African Americans, Latinos, Mormons, and atheists."

In 2011, the Center for American Progress published Fear, Inc.: The Roots of the Islamophobia Network in America. The goal of the report was to expose the organizations, scholars, pundits and activists that comprised a network dedicated to the spread of misinformation and propaganda about American Muslims and Islam.

The report found that seven charitable foundations spent $42.6 million between 2001 and 2009 to support the spread of anti-Muslim rhetoric. The efforts of a small cadre of funders and misinformation experts were amplified by an echo chamber of the religious right, conservative media, grassroots organizations, and politicians who sought to introduce a fringe perspective on American Muslims into the public discourse.

A 2010 Gallup poll has even revealed that about 43% of Americans reported feeling some type of prejudice against Muslims, while the religious group itself makes up one of the smallest populations in the entire country. This indicates that individuals have developed strong opinions about this group of people based on what has been heavily displayed by the media, which has often shown to be negative information.

A report from the University of California Berkeley and the Council on American–Islamic Relations estimated that $206 million was funded to 33 groups whose primary purpose was "to promote prejudice against, or hatred of, Islam and Muslims" in the United States between 2008 and 2013, with a total of 74 groups contributing to Islamophobia in the United States during that period. This has been referred to as the "Islamophobia industry" by scholars Nathan Lean and John Esposito.

==== Fox News ====
In 2014, Vox Media editor Max Fisher said that Fox News is only a small component of the Islamophobia on U.S media. In 2015, Fox News issued an apology for and correction of false claims that formal "no-go zones" existed in England and France, where government had ceded control to Muslims. In 2009, Dr Fred Vultee released an analysis of Fox News which sought to explore the media outlet's practices through the prism of Edward Said's concept of Orientalism; the practices "create an ideological clearinghouse for a uniquely menacing image of Islam." This image is one of a rational, progressive West at constant and irreconcilable odds with an irrational, backward East. In his study, Vultee asserts, "The discourse Fox creates with its audience helps to set a foundation for polarized commentary and to legitimize support for a limitless war on the unknown." As part of his investigation, Vultee analyzed the contents of foxnews.com from 2007 to 2009. According to his research:

A visit any day to the website of the Fox News Channel is likely to offer yet another piece of a sinister puzzle: the looming threat of Islam to everything the West holds dear. There is an armed threat, of course, in Afghanistan and Iraq and possibly as near as the shopping mall. But there is also a cultural danger that menaces all of Europe, that stalks coffee shops and classrooms, that endangers individual children and entire health-care systems with its irreducible demands, that hates Barbie and Valentine's Day and even the Three Little Pigs. And even as the West watches, they have overtaken us as the world's largest religion.

Fox News does not necessarily create the pieces of this puzzle. Much of their content and coverage comes from the Associated Press or is attributed to one of the newspapers belonging to the British arm of Rupert Murdoch's News Corp—The Times, The Sun and The Sunday Times. "What Fox does is act as a collator—a clearinghouse of unrelated and often quite unremarkable developments that, taken together, create a clear ideological dialogue with its audience about how to relate to and interpret the Islamic world."

In the February 2014 issue of the International Communication Gazette, Dr Christine Ogan and her colleagues published an article, "The rise of anti-Muslim prejudice: Media and Islamophobia in Europe and the United States." In their analysis of various polling data, the researchers note:

Empirical evidence for such a possible interaction between media coverage and latent anti-Muslim feelings is mounting. One study that analyzed Fox News viewers' anti-Muslim feelings reported, for example, that 60% of Republicans who most trusted Fox News also believe that Muslims were attempting to establish Sharia law in the United States. And as we reported earlier, those trusting Fox News the most also tend to believe that Islamic values are incompatible with American values (68%). That percentage is lower for those who most trust CNN (37%) or public television/new [media] (37%).

The researchers further claimed that:

Since media coverage of Muslims and Islam is likely to shape the opinions of those who have limited or no contact with this religion and its people, it is important to analyze the potential associations these media portrayals might have with people's attitudes toward Islam in general and Muslims in particular.

=== Europe ===
In 2015, the ENAR (European Network Against Racism) conducted research and found that Muslim women are often portrayed as a suppressed group by the media. According to the reports, wearing a hijab, or any religious clothing is depicted as a form of the violation of women’s rights by news agencies which puts Islam as a religion under a negative light. Through social media platforms such as Facebook and Twitter, Muslim women are often targets of abuse, sexist insults and hate speeches. According to the reports, in 2015, 90% of the victims of Islamophobic incidents in Netherlands that were reported to Meld Islamophobia were Muslim women. The report also mentions that 64% of the British public receives information about Islam through mass media which may explain why the public displays feelings of hostility towards the Muslim Community, particularly the women.

According to the "European Islamophobia Report 2018," released by the Turkish think-tank Foundation for Political, Economic and (SETA) in the Anadolu Agency newsletter, news media coverage in Europe, have minimal news that favour Muslim Groups. According to research carried out by the City University in London, only 0.5% of journalists in the UK are Muslim, and thus the underrepresentation of Muslim journalists could be a crucial reason behind the lack of positive news coverage with regards to Muslim Communities. Moreover, the report also mentioned that the Islamophobic language used in hate speeches by politicians could also impact the representation of Muslims in the minds of the Europeans.

An article by Jan Kovar in the UNYP Newsletter (University of New York in Prague), states that during the course of the migration crisis in Europe (2013-2016), Muslim migrants were portrayed as a security threat to the country in 77% and 67% of news stories about the crisis published by agencies in Czech and Slovak respectively, due to which their community experienced antagonism.

Miqdaad Versi of ‘The Independent’ filed a complaint when the ‘Daily Star’, published a headline stating, “UK mosques fundraising for terror” as it was misleading for the public. Following this, the newspaper clarified its error claiming that the UK mosques were actually “not involved in any way”.

=== United Kingdom ===
In 2008, Peter Oborne of The Independent wrote that British tabloids such as The Sun tend to highlight crimes committed by Muslims in an undue and disproportionate manner. In 2013, British Muslim historian Humayun Ansari said that politicians and the media are still fuelling Islamophobia.

UK media depended on historical archetypes and contemporary stereotypes and that such dependence had had a negative impact on how Muslims are portrayed. Although it stated that the role and impact of the media was both contentious and debatable and that it could not find evidence that media reports had directly caused acts of violence it concluded that the impact of the media should not be dismissed .

It will be argued that Muslims are thought of and represented as ‘un-British’. This echoes previous research into national identity in the UK that argues that non-white minority groups in the UK are thought of as un-British . These concerns over who is ‘British’ can be understood in relation to the media treatment of minority groups.

John E. Richardson's 2004 book (Mis)representing Islam: the racism and rhetoric of British broadsheet newspapers, criticized the British media for propagating negative stereotypes of Muslims and fueling anti-Muslim prejudice. In another study conducted by John E. Richardson, he found that 85% of mainstream newspaper articles treated Muslims as a homogeneous mass who were imagined as a threat to British society.

=== Germany ===
In Germany, journalists, analysts and groups representing minorities and Muslims, said the German media has improved to some degree in its representation of Muslim groups and Islam.

The perception of Muslim minorities shifted significantly toward a more negative view after 9/11, and addressing the resulting issues has proven challenging not only in United States but also to Europe. In the book of Thilo Sarrazin German Politician and former Deutsche Bundesbank executive board member popular 2010 book Deutschland schaft sich ab (Germany Does Itself In) was mentioning about perceived lack of integration by Muslims and even suggested Muslim immigrants were less intelligent than native Germans.

Muslim and immigrant groups in Germany, such as the Central Council of Muslims in Germany (Zentralrat der Muslime in Deutschland), have conducted substantial outreach to German media. Their efforts attempt to improve the public image of Islam and Muslims while also educating journalists, so reframing the ongoing discussion.

=== Canada ===
In Canada, research on mainstream news outlets has found that Muslims are frequently framed through themes of extremism, fanaticism and inequality, contributing to public perceptions of Muslims as a security threat.

A study of Canadian election‑time coverage reported that during the 2006 federal election, 42% of National Post articles associated Islam and Muslims with terrorism, compared to 9% in The Globe and Mail and 14% in the Toronto Star.

Analyses by Canadian Muslim organizations and media scholars argue that such narratives both reflect and intensify Islamophobia, normalizing suspicion toward Muslims and downplaying anti‑Muslim violence.

== Social media ==
According to The Social Network of Hate: Inside Facebook's Walls of Islamophobia, by British academic Imran Awan, Awan himself had gone through 100 different Facebook pages online in which he found "494 specific instances of online hate speech directed against Muslim communities." The five most common forms of abuse were:

1. that Muslim women were a security threat (15%)
2. that Muslims should be deported (13%)
3. that Muslims were potential terrorists (12%)
4. that Muslims were at war with non-Muslims (11%)
5. that Muslims were rapists (9%)

In 2016 in Europe, Facebook had created a new code of conduct that specified to decrease the hateful speech being used on the website.

Facebook's policy director for India and South and Central Asia was reported to have prevented action by Facebook against anti-Muslim content and supported the Hindu nationalist Bharatiya Janata Party (BJP) in internal Facebook messages.

In 2020, Facebook executives overrode their employees' recommendations that a BJP politician should be banned from the site for hate speech and rhetoric that could lead to violence. He had said on Facebook that Rohingya Muslim immigrants should be shot, and had threatened to destroy mosques. Current and former Facebook employees told The Wall Street Journal that the decision was part of a pattern of favoritism by Facebook toward the BJP as it seeks more business in India. Facebook also took no action after BJP politicians made posts accusing Muslims of intentionally spreading COVID-19, an employee said.

The same year, the Delhi Assembly began investigating whether Facebook bore blame for the 2020 religious riots in the city, claiming it had found Facebook "prima facie guilty of a role in the violence". Following a summons by a Delhi Assembly Committee, Facebook India vice-president and managing director Ajit Mohan challenged it saying that the 'right to silence' is a virtue in present 'noisy times' and the legislature had no authority to examine him in a law and order case.

The head leader of public policy in Europe operating Twitter, Karen White, stated that "Hateful conduct has no place on Twitter and we will continue to tackle this issue head on alongside our partners in industry and civil society. We remain committed to letting the tweets flow. However, there is a clear distinction between freedom of expression and conduct that incites violence and hate."

== Lack of representation ==
Some have noted that few Muslims are represented in the media when discussing policies that affect Muslims directly. In 2017, journalists at Media Matters compiled a list of guests that were invited onto three US cable news shows (CNN, Fox News, MSNBC) in the week from January 30 to February 5 to discuss President Trump's controversial Executive Order 13769, which would ban immigration from seven Muslim-majority countries. They found that of the 176 guests that were invited to discuss the issue, less than 8% were Muslim. In 2014, Palestinian activists noted a similar pattern with the underrepresentation of Palestinian guests on cable news during the 2014 Israeli–Gaza conflict.

The inability of the mainstream media to fulfill their obligations had major effects on Muslim societies. The "war on terror" stripped Muslims of any outlets to express themselves through, which in turn exacerbates the emergence of "extremism".

A December 2015 survey by City, University of London of journalists found an underrepresentation of Muslims in the field in the UK. Only 0.4% of British journalists identified as Muslim or Hindu, 31.6% were Christian, and 61.1% had "no religion."

== Disproportionate coverage ==
A 2017 study by students at Georgia State University concluded that "controlling for target type, fatalities, and being arrested, attacks by Muslim perpetrators received, on average, 449% more coverage than other attacks."

The Universities of Georgia and Alabama in the United States conducted a study comparing media coverage of "terrorist attacks" committed by Islamist militants with those of non-Muslims in the United States. Researchers found that "terrorist attacks" by Islamist militants receive 357% more media attention than attacks committed by non-Muslims or whites. Terrorist attacks committed by non-Muslims (or where the religion was unknown) received an average of 15 headlines, while those committed by Muslim extremists received 105 headlines. The study was based on an analysis of news reports covering terrorist attacks in the United States between 2005 and 2015.

Despite popular media representations of Muslims as the perpetrators of terrorism, studies have found that they are also its main victims across the globe. A study conducted by a French non-governmental organization found that 80% of the victims of terrorism are Muslims.

== Media personalities ==
Some media personalities are associated with maintaining Islamophobic perspectives.

The obituary in The Guardian for the Italian journalist Oriana Fallaci described her as "notorious for her Islamaphobia" [sic].

== Arabophobia ==
After the events of September 11, coordinated by the Islamic terrorist organization Al-Qaeda, the media's interest in Islam and the Muslim community has been significant but considered deeply problematic by some. Within minutes of planes crashing into the Twin Towers in New York, "Muslim" and "terrorism" had become inseparable. Many scholars felt that the events of September 11 brought to the fore a marked tone of hysteria, frenzied and ill-informed reporting and a general decline in journalistic standards as far as discussions about Islam and Muslim were concerned. While others say that the biases which inform the media’s coverage of Islam are not the product of a post 9/11 phenomena, nor are they based purely on misinformation. Rather, the roots of this bias date back to the development of an anti-Islamic orientalist discourse, which constituted the identity of the West and continues to shape its discourse. This discourse is premised on the idea of Western superiority and the inferiority of the “rest”. This is because the West has democracy, rationalism and science whereas the “rest” does not. The West has matured whereas the “rest” are dependent on the “West”. The late Edward Said dealt with this orientalist bias at length in his book Covering Islam: How the media and the experts determine how we see the rest of the world.

The fear of Muslims has become more intensified ever since the attacks. The media portrays Islams as a race of people directly associated with violence. In public discussions and in the media, Muslims are mostly portrayed as a monolithic bloc, a closed and united group of people who are totally different from or even intimidating and hostile to a likewise closed "West," which is Christian, secular, liberal, and democratic. The description of the Muslims and Western worlds as two contrasting and contradictory poles leads to a dualistic understanding of relations, disregarding many fine distinctions and exceptions. The so called risk of Arabs has been hyped throughout by the media channels to an extent that now Westerners see Muslims only in the context of somebody who is an adversary of the democratic world order and modernization.

=== Arabophobia stats ===
When Muslims and Islam are discussed on news networks, it is often regarding the "war on terror".

Depiction of Arabs on U.S. News channels
Issues	Fox News	Special Report	Larry King Live	Late Edition	Total
Art & Culture	0	0	0	0	0
Crisis (Socio-eco)	4	19	3	4	30
Development	0	0	0	0	0
Human Rights	0	1	0	0	1
International Relations	0	1	0	0	1
Religion	0	3	2	0	5
Politics	6	9	5	12	32
War on Terror	13	10	14	13	50
Total	23	43	24	29	119

== Response ==
Some media outlets are working explicitly against Islamophobia, and sometimes, the government is accused of conspiring. In 2008, Fairness and Accuracy in Reporting ("FAIR") published a study "Smearcasting, How Islamophobes Spread Bigotry, Fear and Misinformation." The report cites several instances where mainstream or close to mainstream journalists, authors, and academics have made analyses that essentialize negative traits as an inherent part of Muslims' moral makeup. FAIR also established the "Forum Against Islamophobia and Racism", designed to monitor coverage in the media and establish dialogue with media organizations. Following the attacks of September 11, 2001, the Islamic Society of Britain's "Islam Awareness Week" and the "Best of British Islam Festival" were introduced to improve community relations and raise awareness about Islam. In 2012, the Organisation of Islamic Cooperation stated that they will launch a TV channel to counter Islamophobia.

== Pushback ==
Two days after completing his short book: Lettre aux escrocs de l'islamophobie qui font le jeu des racistes (Letter to the Islamophobia Frauds Who Play into the Hands of Racists), Stéphane "Charb" Charbonnier, editor of Charlie Hebdo, was dead. Charb and 11 others were murdered on January 7, 2015 by Chérif and Said Kouachi in their attack on the Parisian office of the satirical magazine.

During his time as editor, Charlie Hebdo aimed its satire at Catholicism, Judaism and radical Islam in equal measure. In his final, posthumous missive, Charb rejects all accusations that he ran a "racist" or "Islamophobic" magazine. "He argues—from a left-wing, anti-racist, militantly secular viewpoint—that the word "Islamophobia" is a trap, set by an unholy alliance of Muslim radicals and the unthinking, liberal Western media. The real issue, he says, is racism and Charlie Hebdo was never racist..."

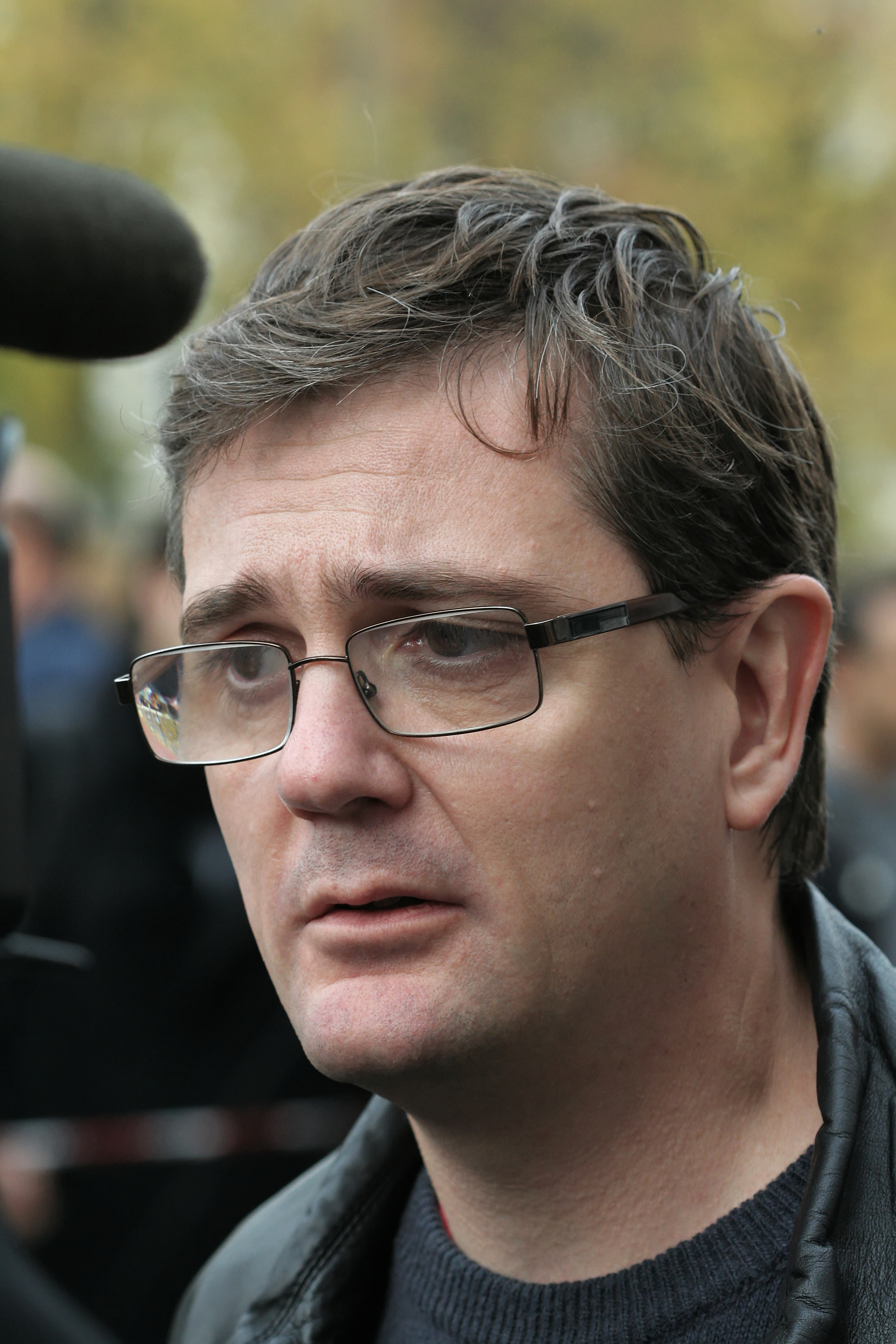
Charb on November 2, 2011

Really, the word "Islamophobia" is badly chosen if it's supposed to described the hatred which some lame-brains have for Muslims. And it is not only badly chosen, it is dangerous. From a purely etymological viewpoint, Islamophobia ought to mean "fear of Islam"—yet the inventors, promoters and users of this word deploy it to denounce hatred of Muslims. But isn't it odd that "Muslimophobia," or just "racism," isn't used instead of "Islamophobia."

...

Racist language—which pressure groups, politicians and intellectuals had managed to corral in the space between the mouth of the xenophobe and his kitchen door—has escaped into the street. It flows through the media and sullies the networks of social media.

So, yes, we are in the middle of an explosion of racist behavior—yet the word "racism" is used only timidly, and is on the way to being supplanted by "Islamophobia." And the campaigners for multiculturalism, who try to foist the notion of "Islamophobia" on the judicial and political authorities, have only one aim in mind: to force the victims of racism into identifying themselves as Muslims.

The fact that racists are also Islamophobic is, I'm afraid, irrelevant. They are, first and foremost, racists. By attacking Islam, they are targeting foreigners or people of foreign origin. But by focusing only on their Islamophobia, we are minimizing the danger of racism. The anti-racist campaigners of old are in danger of becoming overspecialized niche retailers in a minority form of discrimination.

...

However, why do the cartoonists of Charlie Hebdo, who know that their drawings will be exploited by the media, by the retailers of anti-Islamophobia, by far-right Muslims and nationalists, insist on drawing Mohamed and other "sacred" symbols of Islam? Simply because the Charlie Hebdo drawings do not have the vast majority of Muslims as their target. We believe that Muslims are capable of recognising a tongue-in-cheek.

== See also ==
- Islamophobia
  - Islamophobia in Australia
  - Islamophobia in Canada
  - Islamophobia in Norway
  - Islamophobia in Sweden
  - Islamophobia in the United Kingdom
  - Islamophobia in the United States
  - Islamophobia Watch
- List of critics of Islam
- Xenophobia
