= Islamophobia =

Discrimination against Islam or Muslims

Islamophobia, also referred to as anti-Muslim or anti-Islamic sentiment, is the irrational fear of, hostility towards, or hatred of the religion of Islam or Muslims in general. Islamophobia is characterised as a form of religious or cultural bigotry in which Muslims are stereotyped as a geopolitical threat or a source of terrorism. Muslims, with diverse ethnic and cultural backgrounds on a worldwide scale, are often inaccurately portrayed by Islamophobes as a single homogeneous racial group.

The causes of increased Islamophobia across the world since the end of the Cold War are many. These include the quasi-racialist stereotypes against Muslims that proliferated through the Western media since the 1990s, the "war on terror" campaign launched by the United States after the September 11 attacks, the rise of the Islamic State in the aftermath of the Iraq War, terrorist attacks carried out by Islamist militants in the United States and Europe, anti-Muslim rhetoric disseminated by white nationalist organizations through the internet, and the radicalisation of Christian nationalist and far-right groups with growing hostility towards Muslims in the United States and the European Union.

A study conducted in 2013 revealed that Muslim women, especially those wearing headscarves or face veils, are more vulnerable to suffer from Islamophobic attacks than Muslim men. Due to the racialised nature of Islamophobic discrimination and attacks suffered by numerous Muslims in their daily lives, several scholars have asserted that Islamophobia has explicit racist dimensions. On 15 March 2022, the United Nations General Assembly adopted a resolution by consensus which was introduced by Pakistan on behalf of the Organisation of Islamic Cooperation that proclaimed March 15 as 'International Day To Combat Islamophobia'.

The exact definition of the term "Islamophobia" has been a subject of debate amongst Western analysts. Detractors of the term have proposed alternative terms, such as "anti-Muslim", to denote prejudice or discrimination against Muslims. It has been alleged, often by right-wing commentators, that the term is sometimes used to avoid criticism of Islam, by removing the distinction between racism and criticism of religious doctrine or practice. However, academics, activists and experts who support the terminology have denounced such characterisations as attempts to deny the existence of Islamophobia.

== Etymology and definitions ==
The term Islamophobia came into widespread use in the 1990s after it was defined by the Runnymede Trust. While earlier uses of the term have been found, they did not have the current meaning.

Islamophobia has been described as a "copycat neologism," a neologism that copies an earlier neologism without regard to how that neologism was formed. Hence, it copies terms such as homophobia, which is prejudice against homosexuals. These earlier terms may have been copycat neologisms of hydrophobia, which is an historical term for rabies, a lethal illness that causes insanity.

According to the Oxford English Dictionary, the word means "Intense dislike or fear of Islam, esp. as a political force; hostility or prejudice towards Muslims". It is attested in English as early as 1923 to quote the French word islamophobie, found in a thesis published by Alain Quellien in 1910 to describe "a prejudice against Islam that is widespread among the peoples of Western and Christian civilization". The expression did not immediately turn into the vocabulary of the English-speaking world though, which preferred the expression "feelings inimical to Islam", until its re-appearance in an article by Georges Chahati Anawati in 1976. The term did not exist in the Muslim world, (Note: Persian had the expression islām harāsī (اسلام هراسی), "hostility to Islam", similar to ‛adā' al-islām (عَداء الإسلام) in Arabic.) and was later translated in the 1990s as ruhāb al-islām (رُهاب الإسلام) in Arabic, literally "phobia of Islam".

The University of California at Berkeley's Islamophobia Research & Documentation Project suggested this working definition: "Islamophobia is a contrived fear or prejudice fomented by the existing Eurocentric and Orientalist global power structure. It is directed at a perceived or real Muslim threat through the maintenance and extension of existing disparities in economic, political, social and cultural relations, while rationalizing the necessity to deploy violence as a tool to achieve 'civilizational rehab' of the target communities (Muslim or otherwise). Islamophobia reintroduces and reaffirms a global racial structure through which resource distribution disparities are maintained and extended."

=== Alternative names ===
There are a number of other possible terms which are also used in order to refer to negative feelings and attitudes towards Islam and Muslims, such as anti-Muslimism, intolerance against Muslims, anti-Muslim prejudice, anti-Muslim bigotry, hatred of Muslims, anti-Islamism, Muslimophobia, demonisation of Islam, or demonisation of Muslims. In German, Islamophobie (fear) and Islamfeindlichkeit (hostility) are used. The Scandinavian term Muslimhat literally means "hatred of Muslims".

When discrimination towards Muslims has placed an emphasis on their religious affiliation and adherence, it has been termed Muslimphobia, the alternative form of Muslimophobia, Islamophobism, antimuslimness and antimuslimism. Individuals who discriminate against Muslims in general have been termed Islamophobes, Islamophobists, anti-Muslimists, antimuslimists, islamophobiacs, anti-Muhammadan, Muslimphobes or its alternative spelling of Muslimophobes, while religiously intolerant individuals motivated by a specific anti-Muslim agenda or bigotry have been described as being anti-mosque, anti-Shiites (or Shiaphobes), anti-Sufism (or Sufi-phobia) and anti-Sunni (or Sunniphobes).

=== Debate on the term and its limitations ===
In 1996, the Runnymede Trust established the Commission on British Muslims and Islamophobia (CBMI), chaired by Gordon Conway, the vice-chancellor of the University of Sussex. The Commission's report, Islamophobia: A Challenge for Us All, was published in November 1997 by the Home Secretary, Jack Straw. In the Runnymede report, Islamophobia was defined as "an outlook or world-view involving an unfounded dread and dislike of Muslims, which results in practices of exclusion and discrimination." The introduction of the term was justified by the report's assessment that "anti-Muslim prejudice has grown so considerably and so rapidly in recent years that a new item in the vocabulary is needed".

In 2008, a workshop on 'Thinking Through Islamophobia' proposed a definition of Islamophobia which rejected the idea of Islamophobia as being the product of closed and open views of Islam and focused on Islamophobia as performative which problematised Muslim agency and identity. The symposium was an early attempt to bring insights from critical race theory, postcolonial and decolonial thought to bear on the question of Islamophobia.

At a 2009 symposium on "Islamophobia and Religious Discrimination", Robin Richardson, a former director of the Runnymede Trust and the editor of Islamophobia: a challenge for us all, said that "the disadvantages of the term Islamophobia are significant" on seven different grounds, including that it implies it is merely a "severe mental illness" affecting "only a tiny minority of people"; that use of the term makes those to whom it is applied "defensive and defiant" and absolves the user of "the responsibility of trying to understand them" or trying to change their views; that it implies that hostility to Muslims is divorced from factors such as skin color, immigrant status, fear of fundamentalism, or political or economic conflicts; that it conflates prejudice against Muslims in one's own country with dislike of Muslims in countries with which the West is in conflict; that it fails to distinguish between people who are against all religion from people who dislike Islam specifically; and that the actual issue being described is hostility to Muslims, "an ethno-religious identity within European countries", rather than hostility to Islam. Nonetheless, he argued that the term is here to stay, and that it is important to define it precisely.

The exact definition of Islamophobia continues to be discussed, with academics such as Chris Allen saying that it lacks a clear definition. According to Erik Bleich, in his article "Defining and Researching Islamophobia", even when definitions are more specific, there is still significant variation in the precise formulations of Islamophobia. As with parallel concepts like homophobia or xenophobia, Islamophobia connotes a broader set of negative attitudes or emotions directed at individuals of groups because of perceived membership in a defined category. Mattias Gardell defined Islamophobia as "socially reproduced prejudices and aversion to Islam and Muslims, as well as actions and practices that attack, exclude or discriminate against persons on the basis that they are or perceived to be Muslim and be associated with Islam".

=== Irrational fear ===
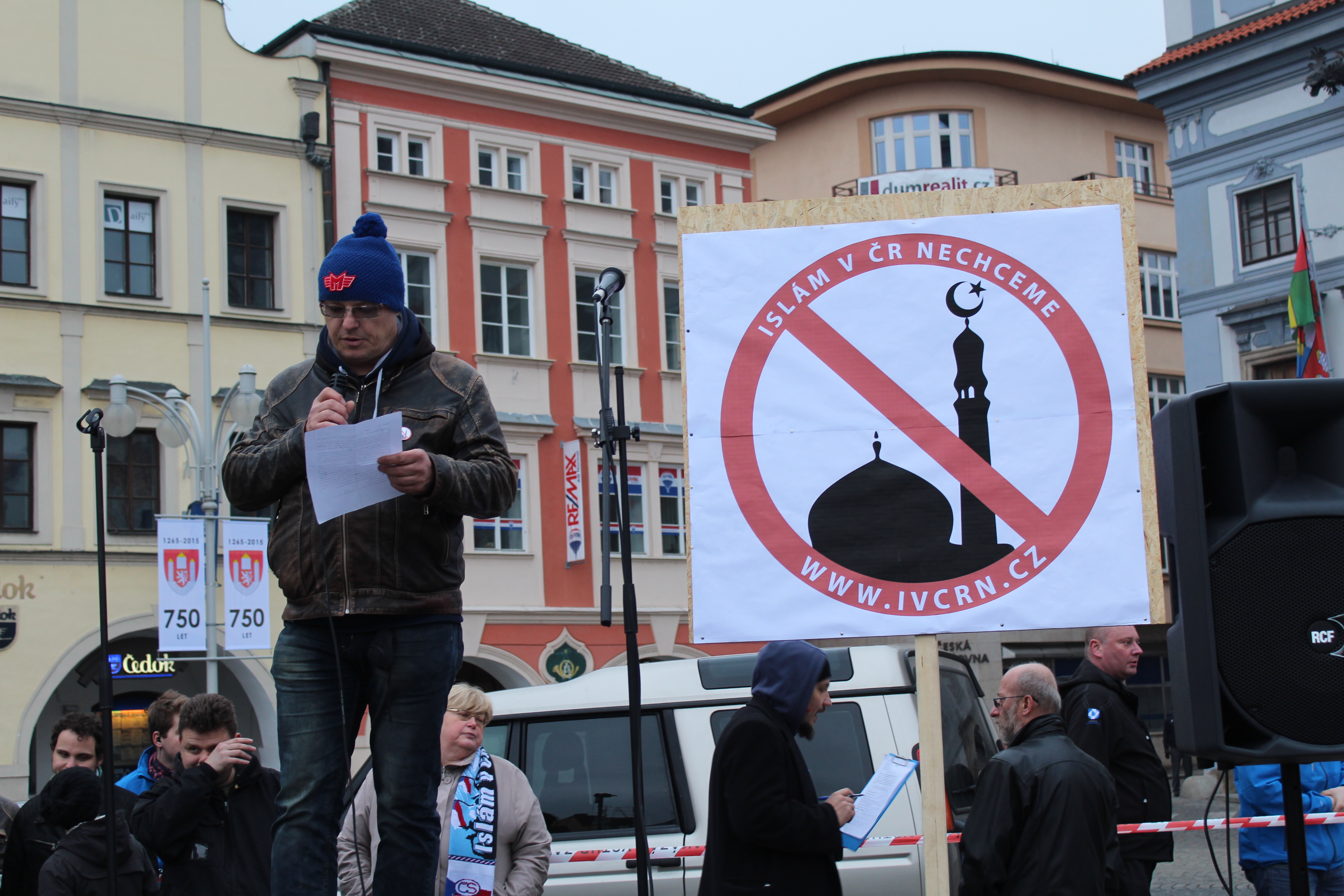
Speaker at a demonstration of the initiative We do not want Islam in the Czech Republic in 2015

As opposed to being a psychological or individualistic phobia, according to professors of religion Peter Gottschalk and Gabriel Greenberg, "Islamophobia" connotes a social anxiety about Islam and Muslims. Some social scientists have adopted this definition and developed instruments to measure Islamophobia in form of fearful attitudes towards, and avoidance of, Muslims and Islam, arguing that Islamophobia should "essentially be understood as an affective part of social stigma towards Islam and Muslims, namely fear."

=== Relation to racism ===
Several scholars consider Islamophobia to be a form of racism. A 2007 article in Journal of Sociology defines Islamophobia as anti-Muslim racism and a continuation of anti-Asian, anti-Turkic and anti-Arab racism. In their books, Deepa Kumar and Junaid Rana have argued that formation of Islamophobic discourses has paralleled the development of other forms of racial bigotry. Similarly, John Denham has drawn parallels between modern Islamophobia and the antisemitism of the 1930s, as have Maud Olofsson and Jan Hjärpe, among others.

Others have questioned the relationship between Islamophobia and racism. Jocelyne Cesari writes that "academics are still debating the legitimacy of the term and questioning how it differs from other terms such as racism, anti-Islamism, anti-Muslimness, and anti-Semitism." Erdenir finds that "there is no consensus on the scope and content of the term and its relationship with concepts such as racism ..." and Shryock, reviewing the use of the term across national boundaries, comes to the same conclusion.

Some scholars view Islamophobia and racism as partially overlapping phenomena. Diane Frost defines Islamophobia as anti-Muslim feeling and violence based on "race" or religion. Islamophobia may also target people who have Muslim names, or have a look that is associated with Muslims. According to Alan Johnson, Islamophobia sometimes can be nothing more than xenophobia or racism "wrapped in religious terms". Sociologists Yasmin Hussain and Paul Bagguley stated that racism and Islamophobia are "analytically distinct", but "empirically inter-related".

The European Commission against Racism and Intolerance (ECRI) defines Islamophobia as "the fear of or prejudiced viewpoint towards Islam, Muslims and matters pertaining to them", adding that whether "it takes the shape of daily forms of racism and discrimination or more violent forms, Islamophobia is a violation of human rights and a threat to social cohesion".

== Origins and causes ==
=== History of the term ===
The earliest traces of Islamophobia date back to the inception of Islam among the ruling elites of Mecca, the Quraysh. They became aggressive towards Muslims and began to mock, insult, and later begin to fight the earliest Muslims. They regarded Muhammad as a crazed man. One early use cited as the term's first use is by the painter Alphonse Étienne Dinet and Algerian intellectual Sliman ben Ibrahim in their 1918 biography of the Islamic prophet Muhammad. Writing in French, they used the term islamophobie. Robin Richardson writes that in the English version of the book the word was not translated as "Islamophobia" but rather as "feelings inimical to Islam". Dahou Ezzerhouni has cited several other uses in French as early as 1910, and from 1912 to 1918. These early uses of the term did not, according to Christopher Allen, have the same meaning as in contemporary usage, as they described a fear of Islam by liberal Muslims and Muslim feminists, rather than a fear or dislike/hatred of Muslims by non-Muslims. On the other hand, Fernando Bravo López argues that Dinet and ibn Sliman's use of the term was as a criticism of overly hostile attitudes to Islam by a Belgian orientalist, Henri Lammens, whose project they saw as a "'pseudo-scientific crusade in the hope of bringing Islam down once and for all.'" He also notes that an early definition of Islamophobia appears in the 1910 Ph.D. thesis of Alain Quellien, a French colonial bureaucrat:

For some, the Muslim is the natural and irreconcilable enemy of the Christian and the European; Islam is the negation of civilization, and barbarism, bad faith and cruelty are the best one can expect from the Mohammedans.

Furthermore, he notes that Quellien's work draws heavily on the work of the French colonial department's 1902–06 administrator, who published a work in 1906, which to a great extent mirrors John Esposito's The Islamic Threat: Myth or Reality?.

The first recorded use of the term in English, according to the Oxford English Dictionary, was in 1923 in an article in The Journal of Theological Studies. The term entered into common usage with the publication of the Runnymede Trust's report in 1997. "Kofi Annan asserted at a 2004 conference entitled "Confronting Islamophobia" that the word Islamophobia had to be coined in order to "take account of increasingly widespread bigotry".

=== Increase in Islamophobia during 1990s ===
During the Yugoslav Wars in the 1990s, far-right Serbian Orthodox Christian militants who were heavily indoctrinated with Islamophobic sentiments, perpetrated a genocide against Bosniak Muslims. Since 1989, Serbian leader Slobodan Milošević publicly disseminated Islamophobic rhetoric throughout Yugoslavia, inciting Serbian far-right militants to massacre Bosniak Muslims.

The stereotyping of Bosniak Muslims as a hostile force threatening Europe with "terrorism" in Serbian propaganda was closely linked to the rise of Islamophobic narratives in Western media and European political discourse.

=== Contrasting views on Islam ===
The Runnymede report contrasted "open" and "closed" views of Islam, and stated that the following "closed" views are equated with Islamophobia:

1. Islam is seen as a monolithic bloc, static and unresponsive to change.
2. It is seen as separate and "other". It does not have values in common with other cultures, is not affected by them and does not influence them.
3. It is seen as inferior to the West. It is seen as barbaric, irrational, primitive, and sexist.
4. It is seen as violent, aggressive, threatening, supportive of terrorism, and engaged in a clash of civilizations.
5. It is seen as a political ideology, used for political or military advantage.
6. Criticisms made of "the West" by Muslims are rejected out of hand.
7. Hostility towards Islam is used to justify discriminatory practices towards Muslims and exclusion of Muslims from mainstream society.
8. Anti-Muslim hostility is seen as natural and normal.

These "closed" views are contrasted, in the report, with "open" views on Islam which, while founded on respect for Islam, permit legitimate disagreement, dialogue and critique. According to Benn and Jawad, The Runnymede Trust notes that anti-Muslim discourse is increasingly seen as respectable, providing examples on how hostility towards Islam and Muslims is accepted as normal, even among those who may actively challenge other prevalent forms of discrimination.

=== Identity politics ===
It has been suggested that Islamophobia is closely related to identity politics, and gives its adherents the perceived benefit of constructing their identity in opposition to a negative, essentialised image of Muslims. This occurs in the form of self-righteousness, assignment of blame and key identity markers. Davina Bhandar writes that:

[...] the term 'cultural' has become synonymous with the category of the ethnic or minority [...]. It views culture as an entity that is highly abstracted from the practices of daily life and therefore represents the illusion that there exists a spirit of the people. This formulation leads to the homogenisation of cultural identity and the ascription of particular values and proclivities onto minority cultural groups.

She views this as an ontological trap that hinders the perception of culture as something "materially situated in the living practices of the everyday, situated in time-space and not based in abstract projections of what constitutes either a particular tradition or culture."

In some societies, Islamophobia has materialised due to the portrayal of Islam and Muslims as the national "Other", where exclusion and discrimination occurs on the basis of their religion and civilization which differs with national tradition and identity. Examples include Pakistani and Algerian migrants in Britain and France respectively. This sentiment, according to Malcolm Brown and Robert Miles, significantly interacts with racism, although Islamophobia itself is not racism. Author Doug Saunders has drawn parallels between Islamophobia in the United States and its older discrimination and hate against Roman Catholics, saying that Catholicism was seen as backwards and imperial, while Catholic immigrants had poorer education and some were responsible for crime and terrorism.

Brown and Miles write that another feature of Islamophobic discourse is to amalgamate nationality (e.g. Saudi), religion (Islam), and politics (terrorism, fundamentalism) – while most other religions are not associated with terrorism, or even "ethnic or national distinctiveness". They feel that "many of the stereotypes and misinformation that contribute to the articulation of Islamophobia are rooted in a particular perception of Islam", such as the notion that Islam promotes terrorism – especially prevalent after the September 11, 2001 attacks.

The two-way stereotyping resulting from Islamophobia has in some instances resulted in mainstreaming of earlier controversial discourses, such as liberal attitudes towards gender equality and homosexuals. Christina Ho has warned against framing of such mainstreaming of gender equality in a colonial, paternal discourse, arguing that this may undermine minority women's ability to speak out about their concerns.

Steven Salaita contends that, since 9/11, Arab Americans have evolved from what Nadine Naber described as an invisible group in the United States into a highly visible community that directly or indirectly has an effect on the United States' culture wars, foreign policy, presidential elections and legislative tradition.

The academics S. Sayyid and Abdoolkarim Vakil maintain that Islamophobia is a response to the emergence of a distinct Muslim public identity globally, the presence of Muslims in itself not being an indicator of the degree of Islamophobia in a society. Sayyid and Vakil maintain that there are societies where virtually no Muslims live but many institutionalised forms of Islamophobia still exist in them.

=== Links to ideologies ===
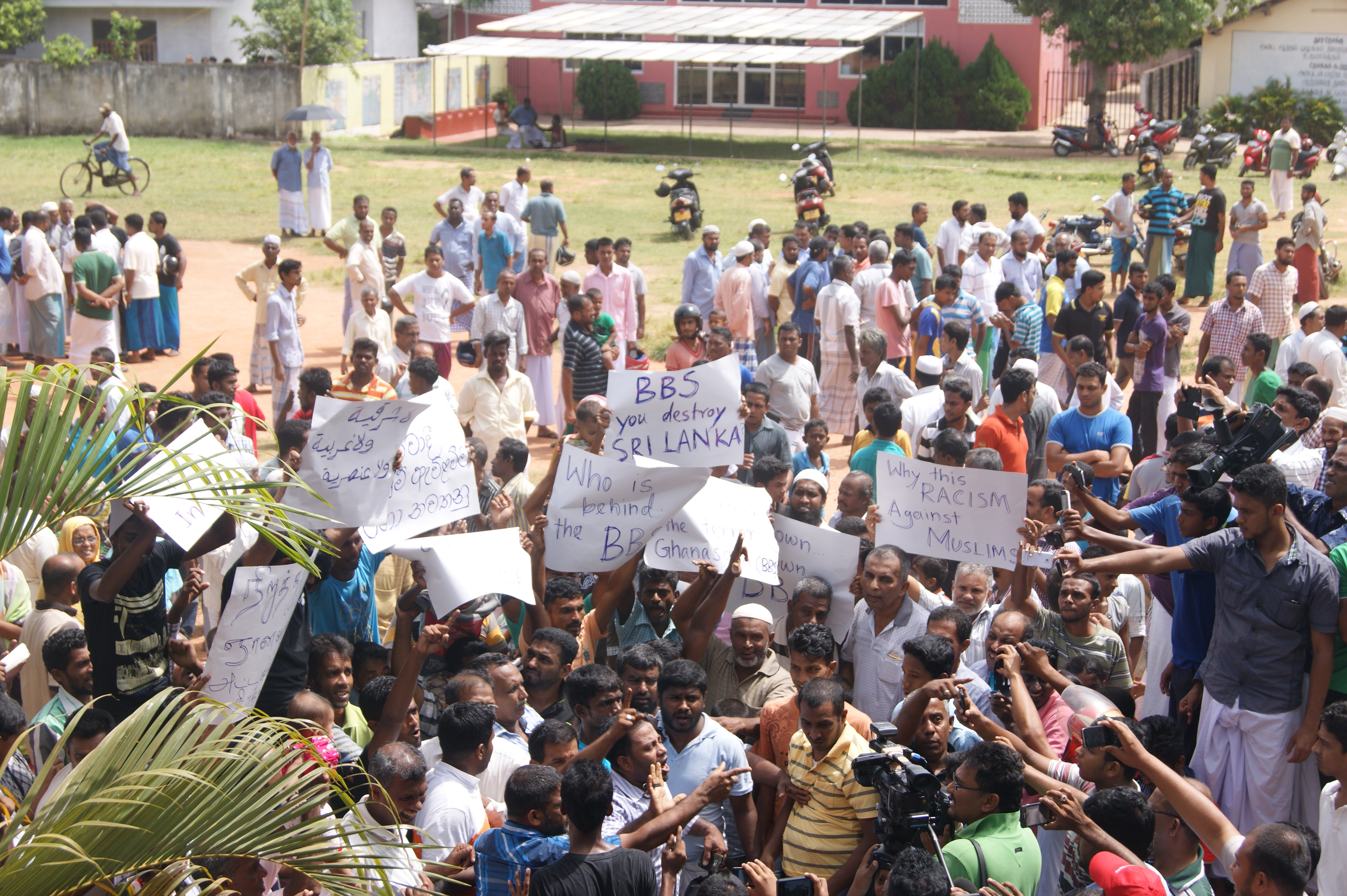
The 2014 anti-Muslim riots in Sri Lanka followed rallies by Bodu Bala Sena (BBS), a hard-line Buddhist group.

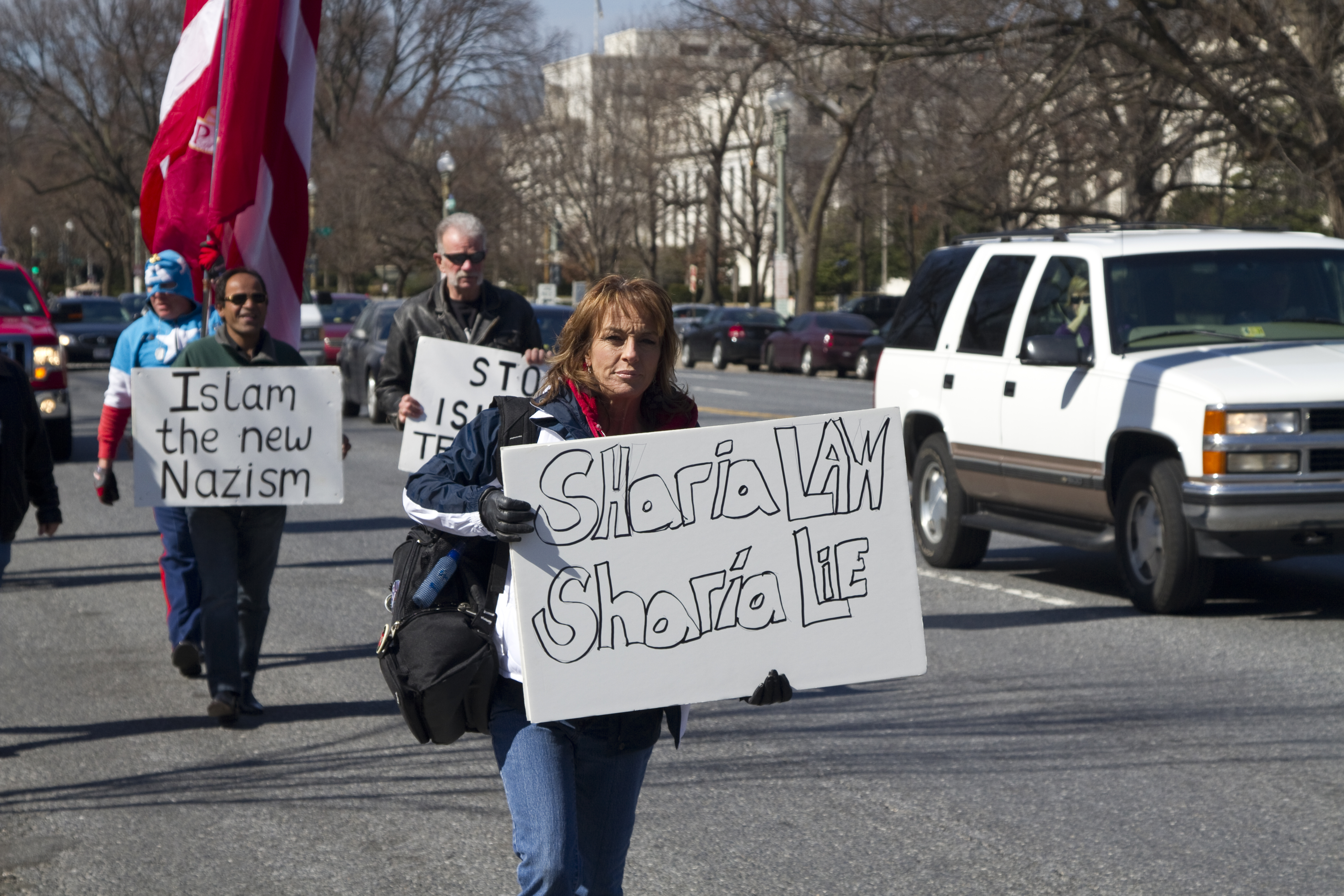
An anti-Islam protest in the United States

Cora Alexa Døving, a senior scientist at the Norwegian Center for Studies of the Holocaust and Religious Minorities, argues that there are significant similarities between Islamophobic discourse and European pre-Nazi antisemitism. Among the concerns are imagined threats of minority growth and domination, threats to traditional institutions and customs, skepticism of integration, threats to secularism, fears of sexual crimes, fears of misogyny, fears based on historical cultural inferiority, hostility to modern Western Enlightenment values, etc.

Matti Bunzl has argued that there are important differences between Islamophobia and antisemitism. While antisemitism was a phenomenon closely connected to European nation-building processes, he sees Islamophobia as having the concern of European civilization as its focal point. Døving, on the other hand, maintains that, at least in Norway, the Islamophobic discourse has a clear national element. In a reply to Bunzl, French scholar of Jewish history, Esther Benbassa, agrees with him in that he draws a clear connection between modern hostile and essentialising sentiments towards Muslims and historical antisemitism. However, she argues against the use of the term Islamophobia, since, in her opinion, it attracts unwarranted attention to an underlying racist current.

The head of the Media Responsibility Institute in Erlangen, Sabine Schiffer, and researcher Constantin Wagner, who also define Islamophobia as anti-Muslim racism, outline additional similarities and differences between Islamophobia and antisemitism. They point out the existence of equivalent notions such as "Judaisation/Islamisation", and metaphors such as "a state within a state" are used in relation to both Jews and Muslims. In addition, both discourses make use of, among other rhetorical instruments, "religious imperatives" supposedly "proven" by religious sources, and conspiracy theories.

The differences between Islamophobia and antisemitism consist of the nature of the perceived threats to the "Christian West". Muslims are perceived as "inferior" and as a visible "external threat", while on the other hand, Jews are perceived as "omnipotent" and as an invisible "internal threat". However, Schiffer and Wagner also note that there is a growing tendency to view Muslims as a privileged group that constitute an "internal threat" and that this convergence between the two discources makes "it more and more necessary to use findings from the study of anti-Semitism to analyse Islamophobia". Schiffer and Wagner conclude,

The achievement in the study of anti-Semitism of examining Jewry and anti-Semitism separately must also be transferred to other racisms, such as Islamophobia. We do not need more information about Islam, but more information about the making of racist stereotypes in general.

The publication Social Work and Minorities: European Perspectives describes Islamophobia as the new form of racism in Europe, arguing that "Islamophobia is as much a form of racism as anti-semitism, a term more commonly encountered in Europe as a sibling of racism, xenophobia and intolerance." Edward Said considers Islamophobia as it is evinced in Orientalism to be a trend in a more general antisemitic Western tradition. Others note that there has been a transition from anti-Asian and anti-Arab racism to anti-Muslim racism, while some note a racialisation of religion.

According to a 2012 report by a UK anti-racism group, counter-jihadist outfits in Europe and North America are becoming more cohesive by forging alliances, with 190 groups now identified as promoting an Islamophobic agenda. In Islamophobia and its consequences on young people (p. 6) Ingrid Ramberg writes "Whether it takes the shape of daily forms of racism and discrimination or more violent forms, Islamophobia is a violation of human rights and a threat to social cohesion." Professor John Esposito of Georgetown University calls Islamophobia "the new anti-Semitism".

In their 2018 American Muslim Poll, the Institute for Social Policy and Understanding found that when it came to their Islamophobia index (see Public Opinion), they found that those who scored higher on the index, (i.e. more islamophobic) were, "associated with 1) greater acceptance of targeting civilians, whether it is a military or individual/small group that is doling out the violence, 2) greater acquiescence to limiting both press freedoms and institutional checks following a hypothetical terror attack, and 3) greater support for the so-called "Muslim ban" and the surveillance of American mosques (or their outright building prohibition)."

Mohamed Nimer compares Islamophobia with anti-Americanism. He argues that while both Islam and America can be subject to legitimate criticisms without detesting a people as a whole, bigotry against both are on the rise.

Gideon Rachman wrote in 2019 of a "clash of civilizations" between Muslim and non-Muslim nations, linking anti-Islam radicalisation outside the Muslim world to the rise of intolerant Islamism in some Muslim countries that used to be relatively free from that ideology.

Blasphemy of Islam has been described as Islamophobia, while some countries consider blasphemy legal as freedom of speech.

=== Opposition to multiculturalism ===
According to Gabrielle Maranci, the increasing Islamophobia in the West is related to a rising repudiation of multiculturalism. Maranci concludes that "Islamophobia is a 'phobia' of multiculturalism and the transruptive effect that Islam can have in Europe and the West through transcultural processes."

== Manifestations ==
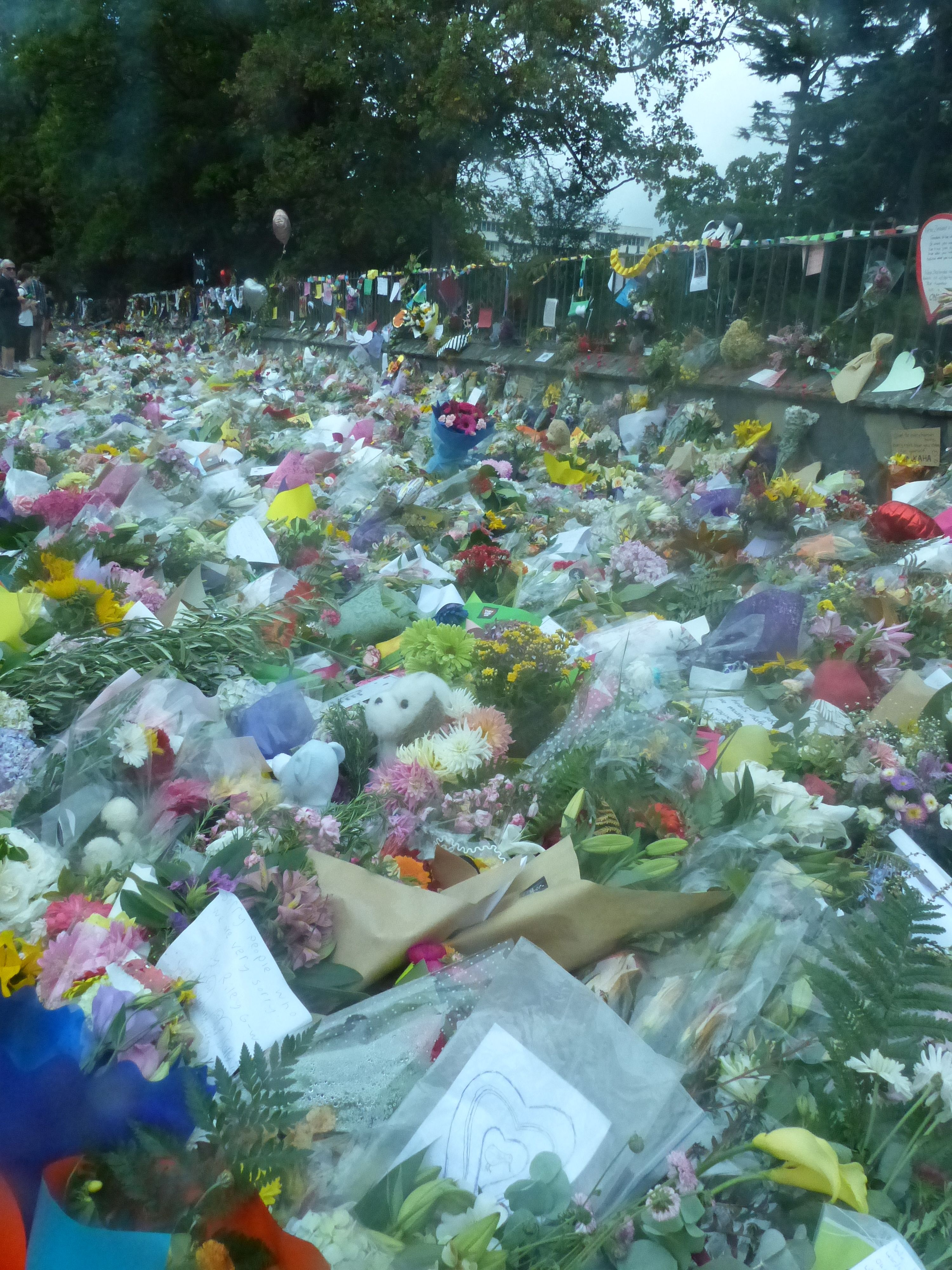
Flower wall memorial erected after mass-shootings in March 2019 targeting Al-Noor Mosque and Linwood Islamic Centre in Christchurch City, New Zealand. The terrorist attack was motivated by far-right extremism and resulted in 51 deaths.

=== Media ===
According to Elizabeth Poole in the Encyclopedia of Race and Ethnic Studies, the media have been criticised for perpetrating Islamophobia. She cites a case study examining a sample of articles in the British press from between 1994 and 2004, which concluded that Muslim viewpoints were underrepresented and that issues involving Muslims usually depicted them in a negative light. Such portrayals, according to Poole, include the depiction of Islam and Muslims as a threat to Western security and values. Benn and Jawad write that hostility towards Islam and Muslims are "closely linked to media portrayals of Islam as barbaric, irrational, primitive and sexist." Egorova and Tudor cite European researchers in suggesting that expressions used in the media such as "Islamic terrorism", "Islamic bombs" and "violent Islam" have resulted in a negative perception of Islam. John E. Richardson's 2004 book (Mis)representing Islam: the racism and rhetoric of British broadsheet newspapers, criticised the British media for propagating negative stereotypes of Muslims and fueling anti-Muslim prejudice. In another study conducted by John E. Richardson, he found that 85% of mainstream newspaper articles treated Muslims as a homogeneous mass and portrayed them as a threat to British society.

The Universities of Georgia and Alabama in the United States conducted a study comparing media coverage of "terrorist attacks" committed by Islamist militants with those of non-Muslims in the United States. Researchers found that "terrorist attacks" by Islamist militants receive 357% more media attention than attacks committed by non-Muslims or whites. Terrorist attacks committed by non-Muslims (or where the religion was unknown) received an average of 15 headlines, while those committed by Muslim extremists received 105 headlines. The study was based on an analysis of news reports covering terrorist attacks in the United States between 2005 and 2015. This was despite the fact that far-right extremists were responsible for almost double the number of terrorist acts in US attributed to Muslim individuals between 2008 and 2016. In spite of this disparity, US and UK governments have been negligent in confronting far-right terrorists, instead focusing almost all their counter-terrorism resources on imposing surveillance measures on Muslim population and censoring Muslim activists. Many right-wing politicians have also engaged in anti-Muslim rhetoric, indirectly motivating far-right groups to intensify violent hate crimes against Muslims.

In 2009, Mehdi Hasan in the New Statesman criticised Western media for over-reporting a few Islamist terrorist incidents but under-reporting the much larger number of planned non-Islamist terrorist attacks carried out by "non-Irish white folks". A 2012 study indicates that Muslims across different European countries, such as France, Germany and the United Kingdom, experience the highest degree of Islamophobia in the media. Media personalities have been accused of Islamophobia. The obituary in The Guardian for the Italian journalist Oriana Fallaci described her as "notorious for her Islamaphobia" [sic]. The Institute for Social Policy and Understanding published a report in 2018 where they stated, "In terms of print media coverage, Muslim-perceived perpetrators received twice the absolute quantity of media coverage as their non-Muslim counterparts in the cases of violent completed acts. For "foiled" plots, they received seven and half times the media coverage as their counterparts."

Nathan Lean used the term "Islamophobia industry" in the 2012 book The Islamophobia Industry: How the Right Manufactures Fear of Muslims to describe how certain ideologies and political proclivities have converged to advance the same agenda. The "Islamophobia industry" has since been discussed by other scholars including Joseph Kaminski, Hatem Bazian, Arlene Stein, Zakia Salime, Reza Aslan, Erdoan A. Shipoli, and Deepa Kumar, the latter drawing a comparison between the "Islamophobia industry" and Cold War era McCarthyism.

Some media outlets are working explicitly against Islamophobia. In 2008 Fairness and Accuracy in Reporting ("FAIR") published a study "Smearcasting, How Islamophobes Spread Bigotry, Fear and Misinformation". The report cites several instances where mainstream or close to mainstream journalists, authors and academics have made analyses that essentialise negative traits as an inherent part of Muslims' moral makeup. FAIR also established the "Forum Against Islamophobia and Racism", designed to monitor coverage in the media and establish dialogue with media organisations. Following the attacks of 11 September 2001, the Islamic Society of Britain's "Islam Awareness Week" and the "Best of British Islam Festival" were introduced to improve community relations and raise awareness about Islam.

Silva and Meaux et al theorised that one of the main causes of negative interactions, stigma, and marginalisation toward the Arabic community is due to the fact that many media framing from news outlets tend to associate Arab-Muslims with terrorism and jihadist-inspired motivations when it came to mass violence incidents. Silva noted in their research looking through New York Times articles about gun violence and noted that over the sixteen-year period of 2000 until 2016 this media framing would only increase through the time period. Silva compared his results to find out that Arabic perpetrators were significantly more like to be framed as terrorists than their White counterparts. Meaux et al note back to research conducted by Park et al that indicated that the most salient association that Americans held on to was Arab-Muslims to terrorism with the notion that people that believed in this association the strongest were more likely to hold implicit bias.

=== Movies ===
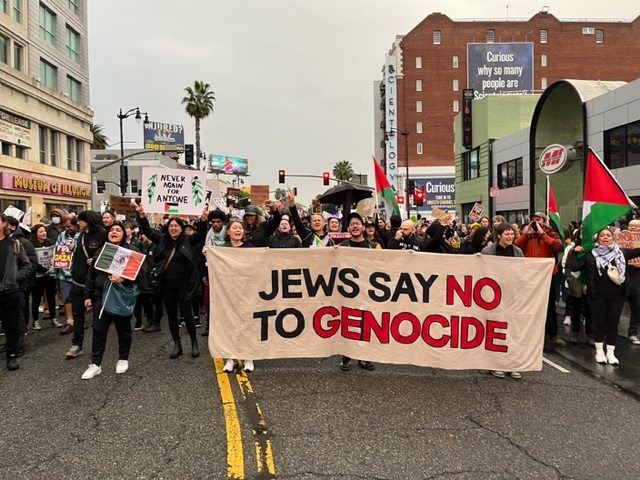
Pro-Palestinian protest in Los Angeles against the war in Gaza and Hollywood's role in dehumanising Muslims, November 2023

Throughout the twentieth century, Muslim characters were portrayed in Hollywood often negatively and with Orientalist stereotypes visualising them as being "uncivilised". Since the Post-9/11 era, in addition to these tropes, a securitisation of Muslims; portraying them as a threat to the Western world, have drastically increased in movie depictions.

There are growing instances of Islamophobia in Hindi cinema, or Bollywood, in films such as Aamir (2008), New York (2009) and My Name is Khan (2010), which corresponds to a growing anti-minorities sentiment that followed the resurgence of the Hindu right.

=== Organisations ===
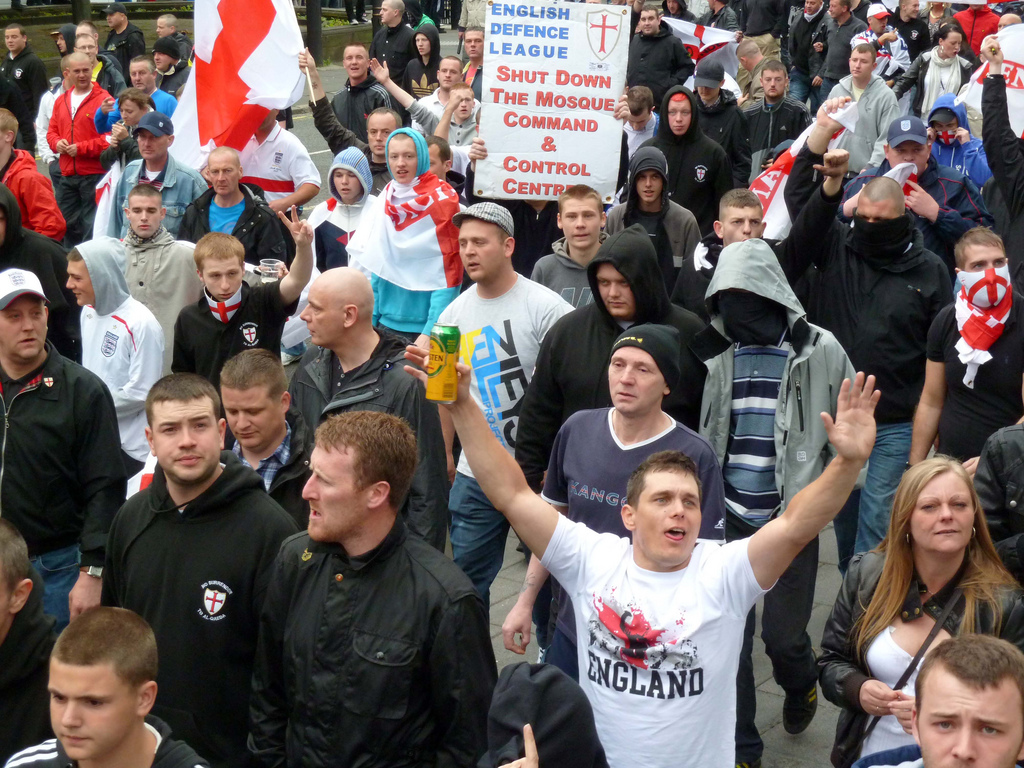
An English Defence League demonstration. The placard reads Shut down the mosque command and control centre.

A report from the University of California Berkeley and the Council on American–Islamic Relations estimated that $206 million was funded to 33 groups whose primary purpose was "to promote prejudice against, or hatred of, Islam and Muslims" in the United States between 2008 and 2013, with a total of 74 groups contributing to Islamophobia in the United States during that period.

Stop Islamization of America (SIOA) and the Freedom Defense Initiative are designated as hate groups by the Anti-Defamation League and the Southern Poverty Law Center. In August 2012 SIOA generated media publicity by sponsoring billboards in New York City Subway stations claiming there had been 19,250 terrorist attacks by Muslims since 9/11 and stating "it's not Islamophobia, it's Islamorealism." It later ran advertisements reading "In any war between the civilized man and the savage, support the civilized man. Support Israel. Defeat Jihad." Several groups condemned the advertisements as "hate speech" about all Muslims. In early January 2013 the Freedom Defense Initiative put up advertisements next to 228 clocks in 39 New York subway stations showing the 2001 attacks on the World Trade Center with a quote attributed to the 151st verse of chapter 3 of the Quran: "Soon shall we cast terror into the hearts of the unbelievers." The New York City Transit Authority, which said it would have to carry the advertisements on First Amendment grounds, insisted that 25% of the ad contain a Transit Authority disclaimer. These advertisements also were criticised.

The English Defence League (EDL) was a far-right, Islamophobic organisation active in England until the mid-late 2010s. It was formed in 2009 to oppose, what it claimed was, the spread of Islamism, Sharia law and Islamic extremism in the UK. The EDL's former leader, Tommy Robinson, left the group in 2013 saying it had become too extreme and that street protests were ineffective.

Furthermore, the 7 July 2005 London bombings and the resulting efforts of the British civil and law enforcement authorities to help seek British Muslims' help in identifying potential threats to create prevention is observed by Michael Lavalette as institutionalised Islamophobia. Lavalette alleges that there is a continuity between the former two British governments over prevention that aims to stop young Muslim people from being misled, misdirected and recruited by extremists who exploit grievances for their own "jihadist" endeavours. Asking and concentrating on Muslim communities and young Muslims to prevent future instances, by the authorities, is in itself Islamophobia as such since involvement of Muslim communities will highlight and endorse their compassion for Britain and negate the perceived threats from within their communities.

=== Public opinion ===
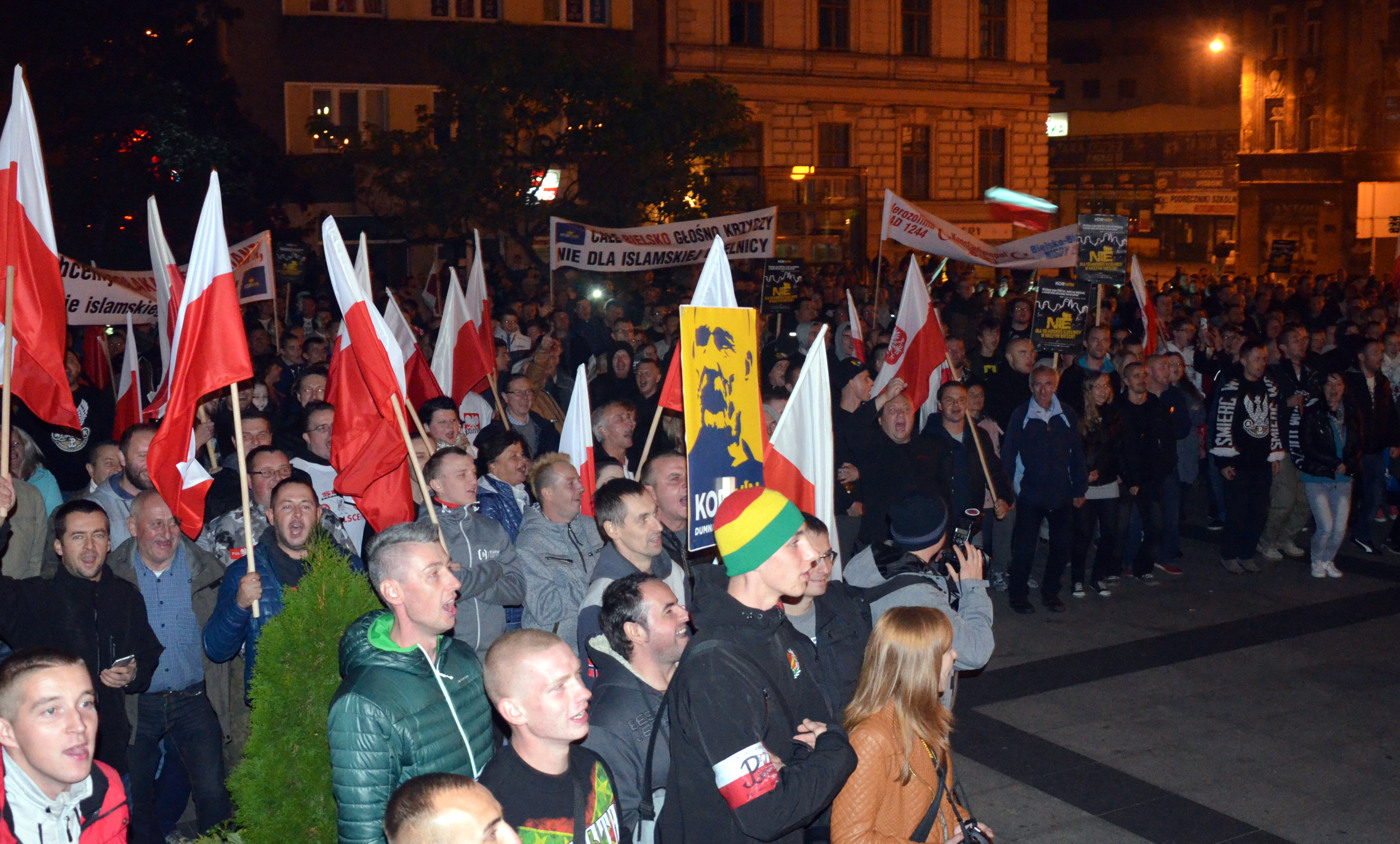
Anti-Islam rally in Poland in 2015

The extent of negative attitudes towards Muslims varies across different parts of Europe. Polls in Germany and the Czech Republic (as well as South Korea) have suggested that most respondents do not welcome Muslim refugees in those countries.

A 2017 Chatham House poll of more than 10,000 people in 10 European countries had on average 55% agreeing that all further migration from Muslim-majority countries should be stopped, with 20% disagreeing and 25% offered no opinion. By country, majority opposition was found in Poland (71%), Austria (65%), Belgium (64%), Hungary (64%), France (61%), Greece (58%), Germany (53%), and Italy (51%).

Unfavourable views of Muslims, 2019
| Country | Percent |
| Poland | 66% |
| Czech Republic | 64% |
| Hungary | 58% |
| Greece | 57% |
| Lithuania | 56% |
| Italy | 55% |
| Spain | 42% |
| Sweden | 28% |
| France | 22% |
| Ukraine | 21% |
| Russia | 19% |
| United Kingdom | 18% |

In Canada, surveys have suggested that 55% of respondents think the problem of Islamophobia is "overblown" by politicians and media, 42% think discrimination against Muslims is 'mainly their fault', and 47% support banning headscarves in public.

In the United States, a 2011 YouGov poll found that 50% of respondents expressed an unfavourable view of Islam, compared to 23% expressing a favourable view. Another YouGov poll done in 2015 had 55% of respondents expressing an unfavourable view. However, according to a 2018 Institute for Social Policy and Understanding, 86% of American respondents said they wanted to "live in a country where no one is targeted for their religious identity", 83% told ISPU they supported "protecting the civil rights of American Muslims", 66% believed negative political rhetoric toward Muslims was harmful to U.S., and 65% agreed that Islamophobia produced discriminatory consequences for Muslims in America.

The chart below displays collected data from the ISPU 2018 American Muslim Poll which surveyed six different faith populations in the United States. The statements featured in this chart were asked to participants who then responded on a scale from strongly agree to strongly disagree. The total percentage of those who answered agree and strongly agree are depicted as follows:

Question 1: "I want to live in a country where no one is targeted for their religious identity."

Question 2: "The negative things politicians say regarding Muslims is harmful to our country."

Question 3: "Most Muslims living in the United States are no more responsible for violence carried out by a Muslim than anyone else."

Question 4: "Most Muslims living in the United States are victims of discrimination because of their faith."

- Question 1 (% Net agree)
- Question 2 (% Net agree)
- Question 3 (% Net Agree)
- Question 4 (% Net agree)

The table below represents the Islamophobia Index, also from the 2018 ISPU poll. This data displays an index of Islamophobia among faith populations in the United States.

ISPU Islamophobia Index
| Most Muslims living in the United States... (% Net agree shown) | Muslim | Jewish | Catholic | Protestant | White Evangelical | Non-Affiliated | General Public |
|---|---|---|---|---|---|---|---|
| Are more prone to violence | 18% | 15% | 12% | 13% | 23% | 8% | 13% |
| Discriminate against women | 12% | 23% | 29% | 30% | 36% | 18% | 26% |
| Are hostile to the United States | 12% | 13% | 9% | 14% | 23% | 8% | 12% |
| Are less civilized than other people | 8% | 6% | 4% | 6% | 10% | 1% | 6% |
| Are partially responsible for acts of violence carried out by other Muslims | 10% | 16% | 11% | 12% | 14% | 8% | 12% |
| Index (0 min- 100 max) | 17 | 22 | 22 | 31 | 40 | 14 | 24 |

=== Internalised Islamophobia ===
ISPU also highlighted a particular trend in relation to anti-Muslim sentiment in the U.S. – internalised Islamophobia among Muslim populations themselves. When asked if they felt most people want them to be ashamed of their faith identity, 30% of Muslims agreed (a higher percentage than any other faith group). When asked if they believed that their faith community was more prone to negative behaviour than other faith communities, 30% of Muslims agreed, again, a higher percentage than other faith groups.

== Trends ==
Islamophobia has become a topic of increasing sociological and political importance. According to Benn and Jawad, Islamophobia has increased since Ayatollah Khomeini's 1989 fatwa inciting Muslims to attempt to murder Salman Rushdie, the author of The Satanic Verses, and since the September 11 attacks in 2001. Anthropologist Steven Vertovec writes that the purported growth in Islamophobia may be associated with increased Muslim presence in society and successes. He suggests a circular model, where increased hostility towards Islam and Muslims results in governmental countermeasures such as institutional guidelines and changes to legislation, which itself may fuel further Islamophobia due to increased accommodation for Muslims in public life. Vertovec concludes: "As the public sphere shifts to provide a more prominent place for Muslims, Islamophobic tendencies may amplify."

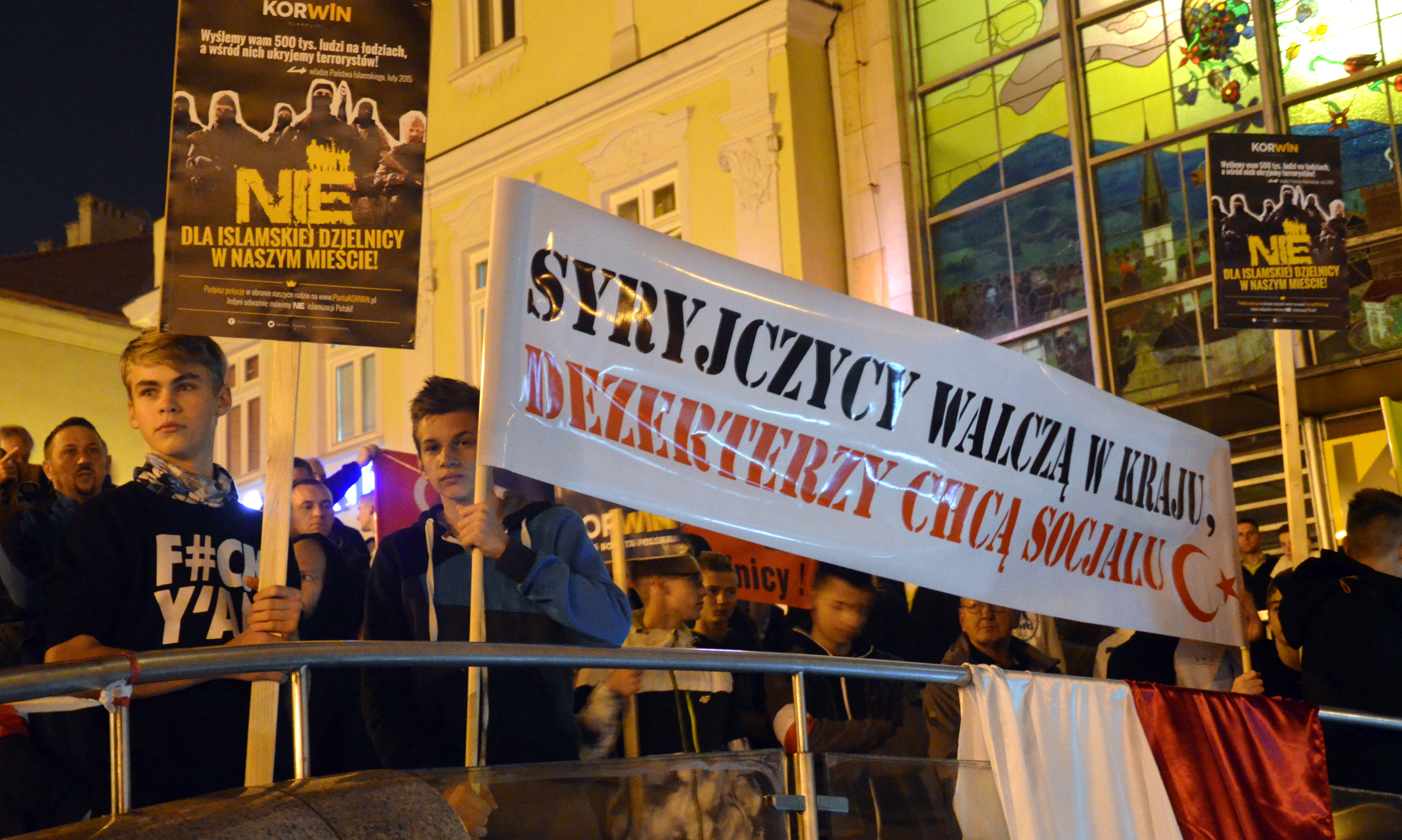
An anti-Islamic protest in Poland

Patel, Humphries, and Naik (1998) claim that "Islamophobia has always been present in Western countries and cultures. In the last two decades, it has become accentuated, explicit and extreme." However, Vertovec states that some have observed that Islamophobia has not necessarily escalated in the past decades, but that there has been increased public scrutiny of it. According to Abduljalil Sajid, one of the members of the Runnymede Trust's Commission on British Muslims and Islamophobia, "Islamophobias" have existed in varying strains throughout history, with each version possessing its own distinct features as well as similarities or adaptations from others.

In 2005 Ziauddin Sardar, an Islamic scholar, wrote in the New Statesman that Islamophobia is a widespread European phenomenon. He noted that each country has anti-Muslim political figures, citing Jean-Marie Le Pen in France; Pim Fortuyn in the Netherlands; and Philippe van der Sande of Vlaams Blok, a Flemish nationalist party in Belgium. Sardar argued that Europe is "post-colonial, but ambivalent". Minorities are regarded as acceptable as an underclass of menial workers, but if they want to be upwardly mobile anti-Muslim prejudice rises to the surface. Wolfram Richter, professor of economics at Technical University of Dortmund, told Sardar: "I am afraid we have not learned from our history. My main fear is that what we did to Jews we may now do to Muslims. The next holocaust would be against Muslims." Similar fears, as noted by Kenan Malik in his book From Fatwa to Jihad, had been previously expressed in the UK by Muslim philosopher Shabbir Akhtar in 1989, and Massoud Shadjareh, chair of the Islamic Human Rights Commission in 2000. In 2006 Salma Yaqoob, a Respect Party Councillor, claimed that Muslims in Britain were "subject to attacks reminiscent of the gathering storm of anti-Semitism in the first decades of the last century." Malik, a senior visiting fellow in the Department of Political, International and Policy Studies at the University of Surrey, has described these claims of a brewing holocaust as "hysterical to the point of delusion"; whereas Jews in Hitler's Germany were given the official designation of Untermenschen, and were subject to escalating legislation which diminished and ultimately removed their rights as citizens, Malik noted that in cases where "Muslims are singled out in Britain, it is often for privileged treatment" such as the 2005 legislation banning "incitement to religious hatred", the special funding Muslim organisations and bodies receive from local and national government, the special provisions made by workplaces, school and leisure centres for Muslims, and even suggestions by the Archbishop of Canterbury Rowan Williams and the former Lord Chief Justice, Lord Phillips, that sharia law should be introduced into Britain. The fact is, wrote Malik, that such well-respected public figures as Akhtar, Shadjareh and Yaqoob need "a history lesson about the real Holocaust reveals how warped the Muslim grievance culture has become."

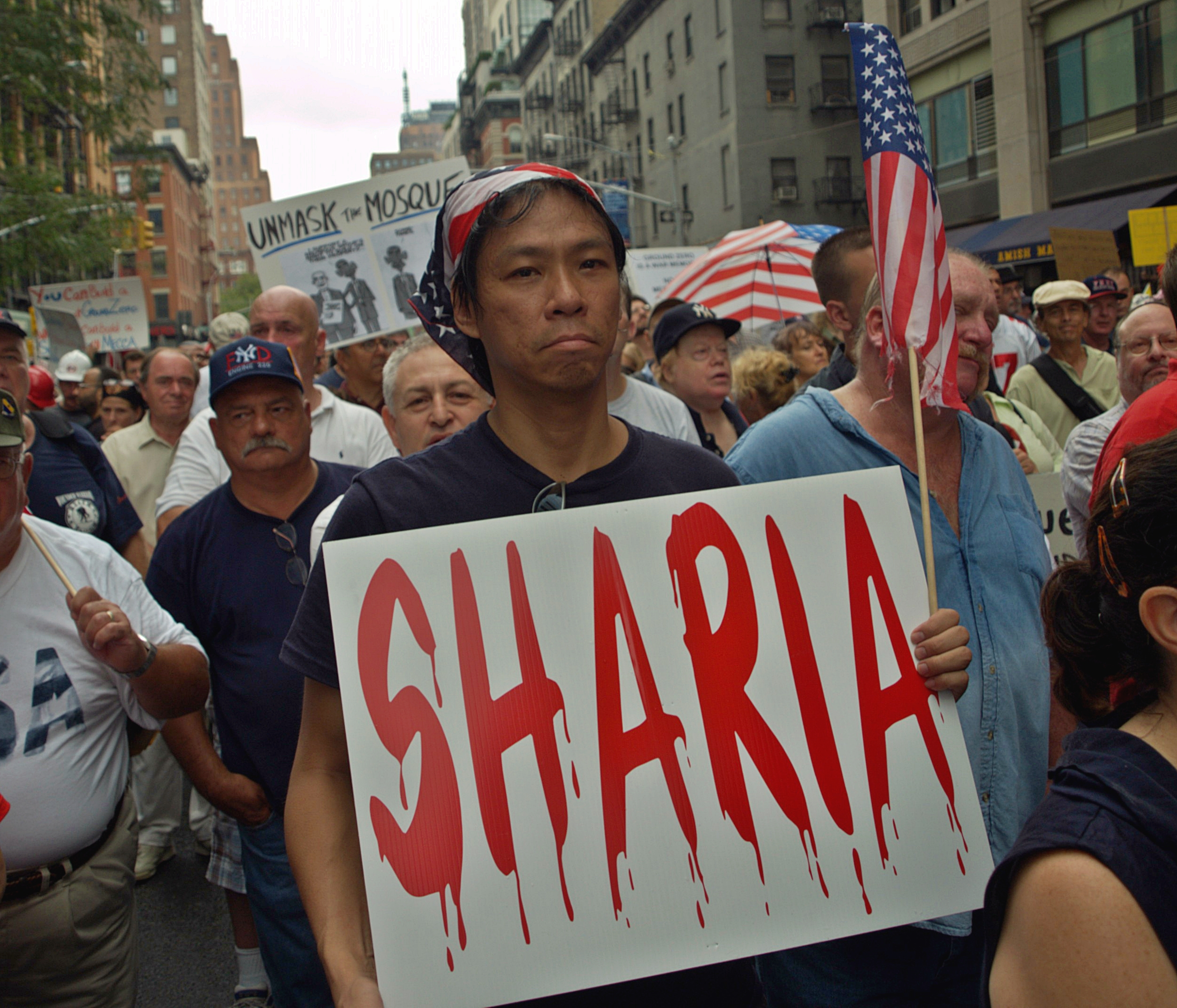
A protester opposing the Park51 project carries an anti-sharia sign.

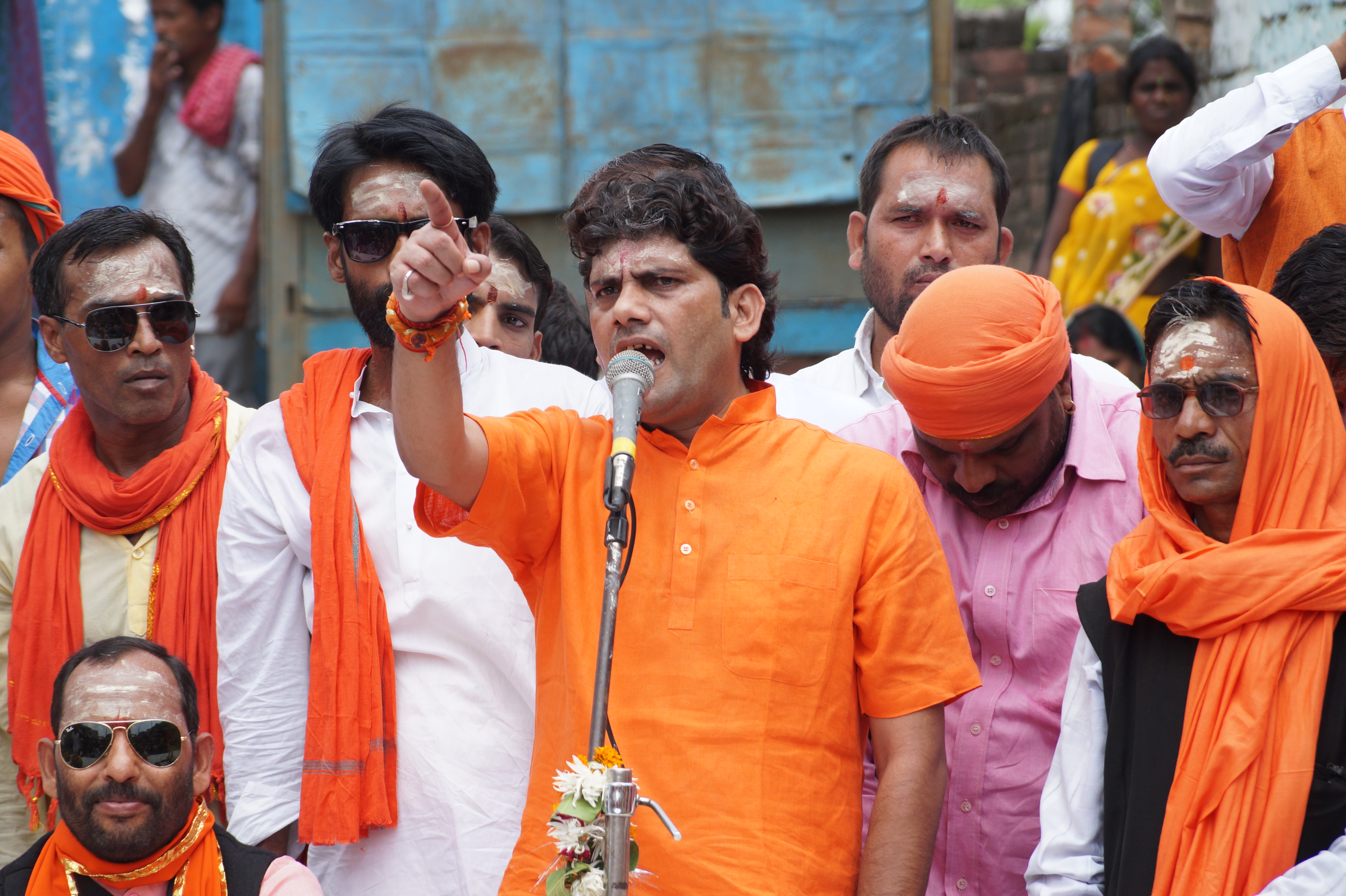
Hindu nationalist politician Arun Pathak organised a celebration in Varanasi to commemorate the 1992 demolition of the Babri Masjid mosque.

In 2006 ABC News reported that "public views of Islam are one casualty of the post-September 11, 2001 conflict: Nearly six in 10 Americans think the religion is prone to violent extremism, nearly half regard it unfavourably, and a remarkable one in four admits to prejudicial feelings against Muslims and Arabs alike." They also report that 27 percent of Americans admit feelings of prejudice against Muslims. Gallup polls in 2006 found that 40 percent of Americans admit to prejudice against Muslims, and 39 percent believe Muslims should carry special identification. These trends have only worsened with the use of Islamophobia as a campaign tactic during the 2008 American presidential election (with several Republican politicians and pundits, including Donald Trump, asserting that Democratic candidate Barack Obama is secretly a Muslim), during the 2010 mid-term elections (during which a proposed Islamic community center was dubbed the "Ground Zero Mosque"), and the 2016 presidential election, during which Republican nominee Donald Trump proposed banning the entrance into the country of all Muslims. Associate Professor Deepa Kumar writes that "Islamophobia is about politics rather than religion per se" and that modern-day demonisation of Arabs and Muslims by US politicians and others is racist and Islamophobic, and employed in support of what she describes as an unjust war. About the public impact of this rhetoric, she says that "One of the consequences of the relentless attacks on Islam and Muslims by politicians and the media is that Islamophobic sentiment is on the rise." She also chides some "people on the left" for using the same "Islamophobic logic as the Bush regime". In this regard, Kumar confirms the assertions of Stephen Sheehi, who "conceptualises Islamophobia as an ideological formation within the context of the American empire. Doing so "allows us to remove it from the hands of 'culture' or from the myth of a single creator or progenitor, whether it be a person, organisation or community." An ideological formation, in this telling, is a constellation of networks that produce, proliferate, benefit from, and traffic in Islamophobic discourses."

The writer and scholar on religion Reza Aslan has said that "Islamophobia has become so mainstream in this country that Americans have been trained to expect violence against Muslims – not excuse it, but expect it".

A January 2010 British Social Attitudes Survey found that the British public "is far more likely to hold negative views of Muslims than of any other religious group," with "just one in four" feeling "positively about Islam", and a "majority of the country would be concerned if a mosque was built in their area, while only 15 per cent expressed similar qualms about the opening of a church."

A 2016 report by CAIR and University of California, Berkeley's Center for Race and Gender said that groups promoting islamophobia in the US had access to US$206 million between 2008 and 2013. The author of the report said that "The hate that these groups are funding and inciting is having real consequences like attacks on mosques all over the country and new laws discriminating against Muslims in America."

In the United States, religious discrimination against Muslims has become a significant issue of concern. In 2018, The Institute for Social Policy and Understanding found that out of the groups studied, Muslims are the most likely faith community to experience religious discrimination, the data having been that way since 2015. Despite 61% of Muslims reporting experiencing religious discrimination at some level and 62% reporting that most Americans held negative stereotypes about their community, 23% reported that their faith made them feel "out of place in the world". There are intersections with racial identity and gender identity, with 73% of Arabs surveyed being more likely to experience religious discrimination, and Muslim women (75%) and youth (75%) being the most likely to report experiencing racial discrimination. The study also found that, although, "most Muslims (86%) express pride in their faith identity, they are the most likely group studied to agree that others want them to feel shame for that identity (30% of Muslims vs. 12% of Jews, 16% of non-affiliated, and 4–6% of Christian groups)."

A 2021 survey affiliated with Newcastle University found that 83% of Muslims in Scotland said they experienced Islamophobia such as verbal or physical attacks. 75% of them said Islamophobia is a regular or everyday issue in Scottish society and 78% believed it was getting worse.

=== Anti-Islamic hate crimes data in the United States ===
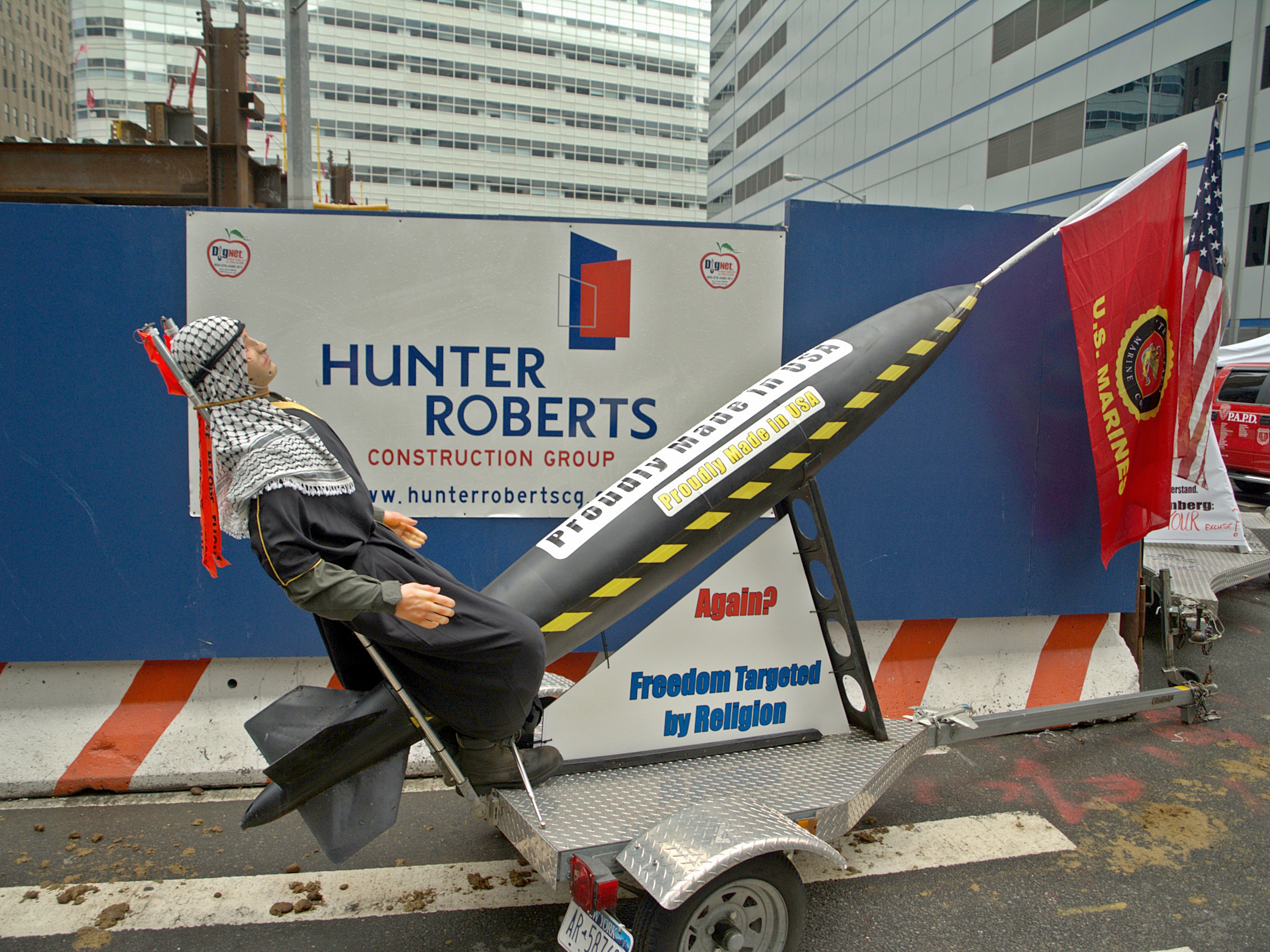
A mannequin symbolising a Muslim in a keffiyeh, strapped to a "Made in the USA" bomb display at a protest of Park51 in New York City

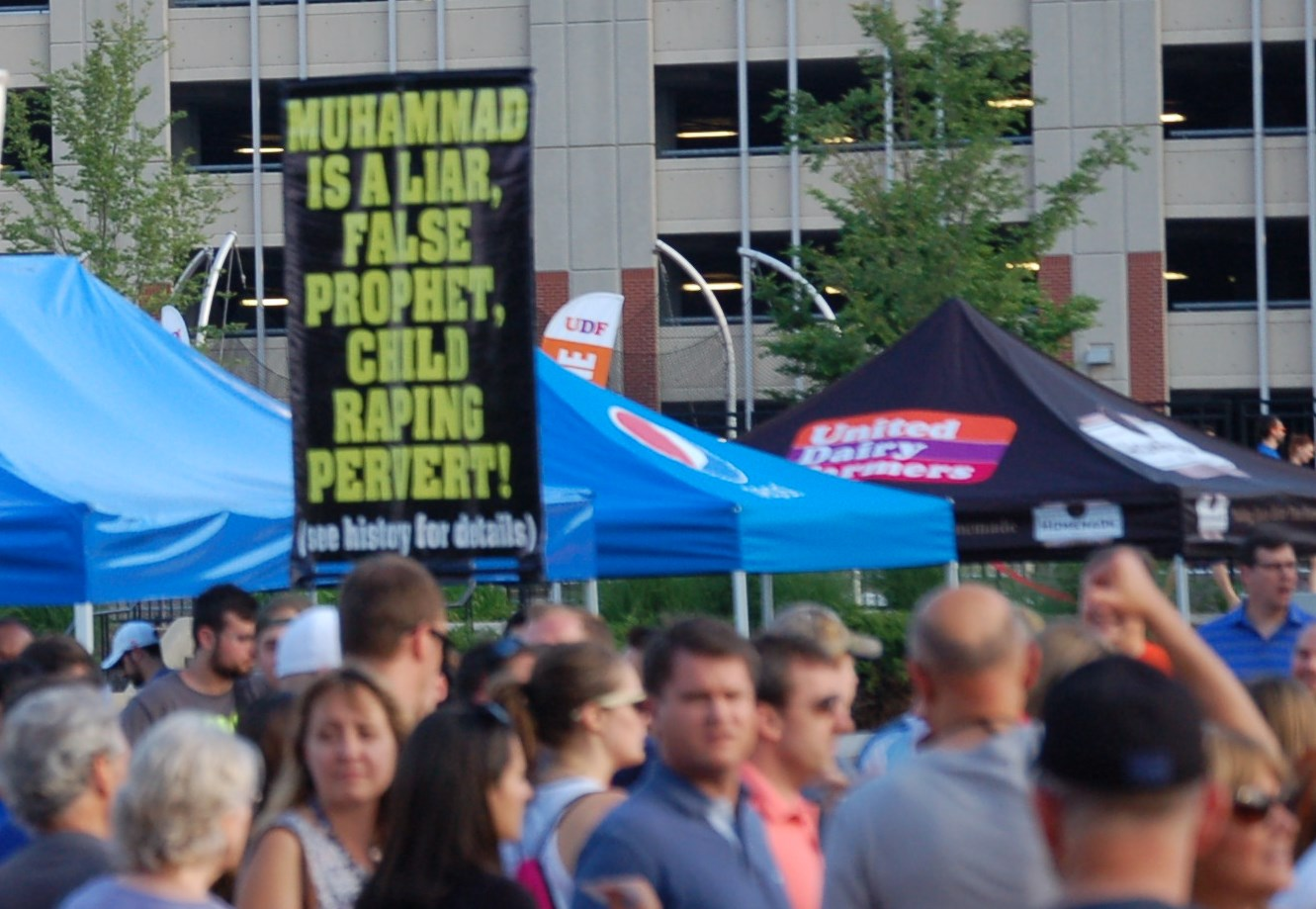
A protest in Cincinnati, Ohio

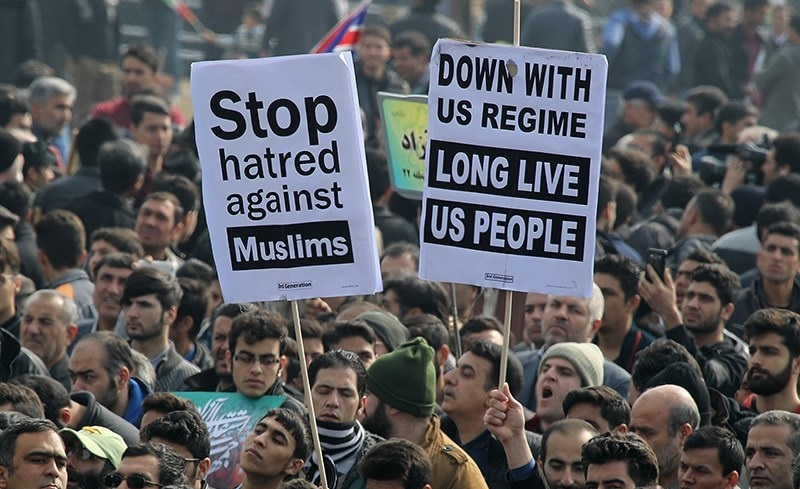
Protests against Executive Order 13769 in Tehran, Iran, 10 February 2017

Data on types of hate crimes have been collected by the U.S. FBI since 1992, to carry out the dictates of the 1990 Hate Crime Statistics Act. Hate crime offences include crimes against persons (such as assaults) and against property (such as arson), and are classified by various race-based, religion-based, and other motivations.

The data show that recorded anti-Islamic hate crimes in the United States jumped dramatically in 2001. Anti-Islamic hate crimes then subsided, but continued at a significantly higher pace than in pre-2001 years. The step up is in contrast to decreases in total hate crimes and to the decline in overall crime in the U.S. since the 1990s.

Specifically, the FBI's annual hate crimes statistics reports from 1996 to 2013 document average numbers of anti-Islamic offenses at 31 per year before 2001, then a leap to 546 in 2001 (the year of 9-11 attacks), and averaging 159 per since. Among those offenses are anti-Islamic arson incidents which have a similar pattern: arson incidents averaged 0.4 per year pre-2001, jumped to 18 in 2001, and averaged 1.5 annually since.

Year-by-year anti-Islamic hate crimes, all hate crimes, and arson subtotals are as follows:

| | Anti-Islamic hate crimes | | All hate crimes |
| Year | Arson offenses | Total offenses | Arson offenses | Total offenses |
| 1996 | 0 | 33 | 75 | 10,706 |
| 1997 | 1 | 31 | 60 | 9,861 |
| 1998 | 0 | 22 | 50 | 9,235 |
| 1999 | 1 | 34 | 48 | 9,301 |
| 2000 | 0 | 33 | 52 | 9,430 |
| 2001 | 18 | 546 | 90 | 11,451 |
| 2002 | 0 | 170 | 38 | 8,832 |
| 2003 | 2 | 155 | 34 | 8,715 |
| 2004 | 2 | 193 | 44 | 9,035 |
| 2005 | 0 | 146 | 39 | 8,380 |
| 2006 | 0 | 191 | 41 | 9,080 |
| 2007 | 0 | 133 | 40 | 9,006 |
| 2008 | 5 | 123 | 53 | 9,168 |
| 2009 | 1 | 128 | 41 | 7,789 |
| 2010 | 1 | 186 | 42 | 7,699 |
| 2011 | 2 | 175 | 42 | 7,254 |
| 2012 | 4 | 149 | 38 | 6,718 |
| 2013 | 1 | 165 | 36 | 6,933 |
| Total | 38 | 2,613 | 863 | 158,593 |
| Average | 2.1 | 145.2 | 47.9 | 8810.7 |
| 1996–2000 avg | .40 | 30.6 | 57.0 | 9,707 |
| 2001 | 18 | 546 | 90 | 11,451 |
| 2002–2013 avg | 1.50 | 159.5 | 40.7 | 8,217 |

In contrast, the overall numbers of arson and total offenses declined from pre-2001 to post-2001.

=== Anti-Islamic hate crimes in Europe ===
There have also been reports of hate crimes targeting Muslims across Europe. These incidents have increased after terrorist attacks by extremist groups such as ISIL. Far-right and right-wing populist political parties and organisations have also been accused of fuelling fear and hatred towards Muslims. Hate crimes such as arson and physical violence have been attempted or have occurred in Norway, Poland, Sweden, France, Spain, Denmark, Germany and Great Britain. Politicians have also made anti-Muslim comments when discussing the European migrant crisis.

According to Yvonne Haddad: The Islamophobia Industry in America is "driven by neocon stars: Daniel Pipes, Robert Spencer, David Yerushalmi, Glenn Beck, Pamela Gellner, Paul Wolfowitz, David Horowitz, and Frank Gaffney as well as native informers Walid Shoebat, Walid Phares, Wafa Sultan, Ayaan Hirsi Ali, Ibn Warraq, Brigitte Gabriel, Tawfik Hamid, and Zuhdi Jasser. They have been prolific, producing and re-circulating false or exaggerated information about Islam and Muslims in order to gain lucrative speaking engagements and increase their influence among neocons in government."

=== Research on Islamophobia and its correlates ===
According to data by the Pew Research Center elaborated by VoxEurop, in European Union countries the negative attitude towards Muslims is inversely proportional to actual presence.

Various studies have been conducted to investigate Islamophobia and its correlates among majority populations and among Muslim minorities themselves. To start with, an experimental study showed that anti-Muslim attitudes may be stronger than more general xenophobic attitudes. Moreover, studies indicate that anti-Muslim prejudice among majority populations is primarily explained by the perception of Muslims as a cultural threat, rather than as a threat towards the respective nation's economy.

Studies focusing on the experience of Islamophobia among Muslims have shown that the experience of religious discrimination is associated with lower national identification and higher religious identification. In other words, religious discrimination seems to lead Muslims to increase their identification with their religion and to decrease their identification with their nation of residence. Some studies further indicate that societal Islamophobia negatively influences Muslim minorities' health. One of the studies showed that the perception of an Islamophobic society is associated with more psychological problems, such as depression and nervousness, regardless whether the respective individual had personally experienced religious discrimination. As the authors of the study suggest, anti-discrimination laws may therefore be insufficient to fully protect Muslim minorities from an environment which is hostile towards their religious group.

Farid Hafez and Enes Bayrakli publish an annual European Islamophobia Report since 2015. The European Islamophobie Report aims to enable policymakers as well as the public to discuss the issue of Islamophobia with the help of qualitative data. It is the first report to cover a wide range of Eastern European countries like Serbia, Croatia, Hungary, Lithuania, and Latvia. Farid Hafez is also editor of the German-English Islamophobia Studies Yearbook.

=== Regional trends ===
==== Anti-Muslim sentiment in Europe ====
Muslim immigration into Europe has led some critics to label Islam incompatible with secular Western society. This criticism has been partly influenced by a stance against multiculturalism advocated by recent philosophers, closely linked to the heritage of New Philosophers, including the likes of Pascal Bruckner. Jocelyne Cesari, in her study of discrimination against Muslims in Europe, finds that anti-Islamic sentiment may be difficult to separate from other drivers of discrimination. Because Muslims are mainly from immigrant backgrounds and the largest group of immigrants in many Western European countries, xenophobia overlaps with Islamophobia, and a person may have one, the other, or both. So, for example, some people who have a negative perception of and attitude toward Muslims may also show this toward non-Muslim immigrants, either as a whole or certain group (such as, for example, Eastern Europeans, sub-Saharan Africans, or Roma), whereas others would not.

Unfavourable views of Muslims in Europe, 2019
| Country | Percent |
| Slovakia | 77% |
| Poland | 66% |
| Czech Republic | 64% |
| Hungary | 58% |
| Greece | 57% |
| Lithuania | 56% |
| Italy | 55% |
| Spain | 42% |
| Sweden | 28% |
| Netherlands | 28% |
| Germany | 24% |
| France | 22% |
| Russia | 19% |
| United Kingdom | 18% |

The European Network Against Racism (ENAR) reports that Islamophobic crimes are on the increase in France, England and Wales. In Sweden crimes with an Islamophobic motive increased by 69% from 2009 to 2013.

An increase of Islamophobia in Russia follows the growing influence of the strongly conservative sect of Wahhabism, according to Nikolai Sintsov of the National Anti-Terrorist Committee.

Various translations of the Qur'an have been banned by the Russian government for promoting extremism and Muslim supremacy. Akhmed Yarlikapov, an expert on Islam, said the Bible too could be banned just as easily for identical motives.

Anti-Muslim rhetoric is on the rise in Georgia. In Greece, Islamophobia accompanies anti-immigrant sentiment, as immigrants are now 15% of the country's population and 90% of the EU's illegal entries are through Greece. In France Islamophobia is tied, in part, to the nation's long-standing tradition of secularism. With the popularisation of the Bulgarian nationalist party ATAKA, Islamophobia in Bulgaria also showed an increase. The party itself participated in the 2011 Banya Bashi Mosque clashes.

==== Anti-Muslim sentiment elsewhere ====
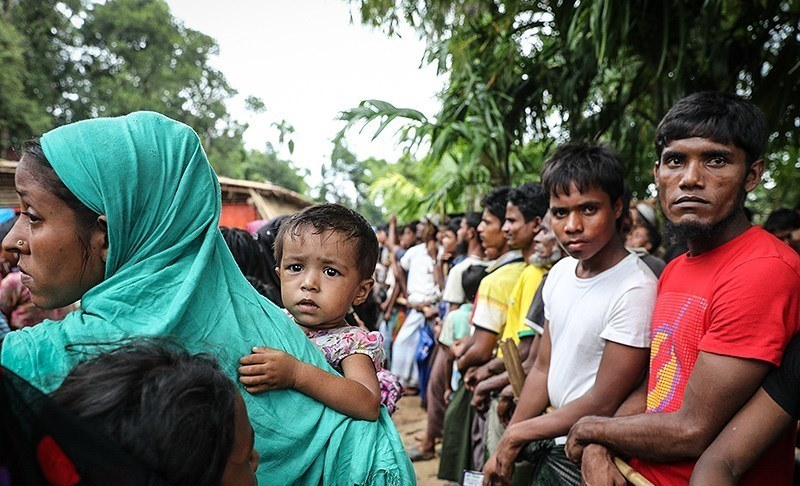
Rohingya Muslim refugees fleeing violence in Buddhist-majority Myanmar in October 2017

A report from Australia has found that "except for Anglicans, all Christian groups have Islamophobia scores higher than the national average" and that "among the followers of non-Christian religious affiliations, Buddhists and Hindus [also] have significantly higher Islamophobia scores."

Following the San Bernardino attack in 2015, Donald Trump, then a candidate for President, proposed "a total and complete shutdown of Muslims entering the United States, until we can figure out what the hell is going on". Throughout the campaign, Trump repeatedly described Islam and Muslim immigrants and refugees as a threat to the West, and condemned then-current President Barack Obama for not referring to Islamic State militants as "Islamic terrorists" or "radical Muslims", accusing Obama of cowardice in the face of radical Islam and claiming that Obama had "founded ISIS" through his foreign policy. Trump's rhetoric was condemned by his opponent, Hillary Clinton, as well as numerous Muslim advocacy groups and activists, and became a focal issue in the 2016 United States presidential election.

In 2016, the Southern Thailand insurgency, having caused more than 6,500 deaths and purportedly fuelled in part by the Thai military's harsh tactics, was reported to be increasing Islamophobia in the country. The Mindanao conflict in the Philippines has also fuelled discrimination against Muslims by some Christian Filipinos.

The 2018 anti-Muslim riots in Sri Lanka was suggested to have been a possible trigger for the 2019 Easter bombings. Muslims in the country have reportedly faced increased harassment after the bombings, with some Sinhala Buddhist groups calling for boycotts of Muslim businesses and trade.

In July 2019, the UN ambassadors from 22 nations, including Canada, Germany and France, signed a joint letter to the UNHRC condemning China's mistreatment of the Uyghurs as well as its mistreatment of other Muslim minority groups, urging the Chinese government to close the Xinjiang re-education camps, though ambassadors from 53 others, not including China, rejected said allegations. According to a 2020 report by the Australian Strategic Policy Institute, since 2017, Chinese authorities have destroyed or damaged 16,000 mosques in Xinjiang – 65% of the region's total.

Emigrants from nearly every predominantly Muslim country have immigrated to Canada. According to a 2013 poll, 54% of Canadians had an unfavourable view of Islam, which was higher than for any other religion (Hinduism, Sikhism etc.).

The 2020 Delhi riots, which left more than 50 dead and hundreds injured, were triggered by protests against a citizenship law seen by many critics as anti-Muslim and part of Prime Minister Narendra Modi's Hindu nationalist agenda. In Myanmar the 969 Movement has been accused of events such as the 2012 Rakhine State riots.

In 2020, there was an anti-Muslim protest in Daegu, South Korea, where all the neighbourhood residents of the "Dar-ul-Emaan Kyungpook Islamic Center" killed pigs in front of the mosque which was under construction. The severed heads of the pigs were hung outside the mosque's construction site with sign-boards saying "Islam is the religion of terrorists". This incident created a lot of controversy as pigs are considered evil amongst Muslims.

== Countering Islamophobia ==
According to a survey conducted by the European Commission in 2015 13% of the respondents would be completely uncomfortable about working with a Muslim person ( orange), compared with 17% with a transgender or transsexual person ( green) and 20% with a Romani person ( violet).

=== International ===
The Organisation of Islamic Cooperation, in its 5th report to Islamophobia Observatory of 2012, found an "institutionalization and legitimization of the phenomenon of Islamophobia" in the West over the previous five years.

On 16 March 2022, UN designated March 15 as International Day To Combat Islamophobia.

=== European Union ===
The largest project monitoring Islamophobia was undertaken following 9/11 by the EU watchdog, European Monitoring Centre on Racism and Xenophobia (EUMC). Their May 2002 report "Summary report on Islamophobia in the EU after 11 September 2001", written by Chris Allen and Jorgen S. Nielsen of the University of Birmingham, was based on 75 reports – 15 from each EU member nation. The report highlighted the regularity with which ordinary Muslims became targets for abusive and sometimes violent retaliatory attacks after 9/11. Despite localised differences within each member nation, the recurrence of attacks on recognisable and visible traits of Islam and Muslims was the report's most significant finding. Incidents consisted of verbal abuse, blaming all Muslims for terrorism, forcibly removing women's hijabs, spitting on Muslims, calling children "Osama", and random assaults. A number of Muslims were hospitalised and in one instance paralysed. The report also discussed the portrayal of Muslims in the media. Inherent negativity, stereotypical images, fantastical representations, and exaggerated caricatures were all identified. The report concluded that "a greater receptivity towards anti-Muslim and other xenophobic ideas and sentiments has, and may well continue, to become more tolerated." The European Monitoring Centre on Racism and Xenophobia has since released a number of publications related to Islamophobia, including The Fight against Antisemitism and Islamophobia: Bringing Communities together (European Round Tables Meetings) (2003) and Muslims in the European Union: Discrimination and Islamophobia (2006).

In 2016, the European Islamophobia Report (EIR) presented the "European Islamophobia Report 2015" at European Parliament which analyzes the "trends in the spread of Islamophobia" in 25 European states in 2015. The EIR defines Islamophobia as anti-Muslim racism. While not every criticism of Muslims or Islam is necessarily Islamophobic, anti-Muslim sentiments expressed through the dominant group scapegoating and excluding Muslims for the sake of power is.

On 26 September 2018, the European Parliament in Brussels launched the "Counter-Islamophobia Toolkit" (CIK), with the goal of combatting the growing Islamophobia across the EU and to be distributed to national governments and other policy makers, civil society and the media. Based on the most comprehensive research in Europe, it examines patterns of Islamophobia and effective strategies against it in eight member states. It lists ten dominant narratives and ten effective counter-narratives.

One of the authors of the CIK, Amina Easat-Daas, says that Muslim women are disproportionately affected by Islamophobia, based on both the "threat to the west" and "victims of...Islamic sexism" narratives. The approach taken in the CIK is a four-step one: defining the misinformed narratives based on flawed logic; documenting them; deconstructing these ideas to expose the flaws; and finally, reconstruction of mainstream ideas about Islam and Muslims, one closer to reality. The dominant ideas circulating in popular culture should reflect the diverse everyday experiences of Muslims and their faith.

==== Sweden ====
Anne Sophie Roald stated that Islamophobia was recognised as a form of intolerance alongside xenophobia and antisemitism at the "Stockholm International Forum on Combating Intolerance", held in January 2001. The conference adopted a declaration to combat "genocide, ethnic cleansing, racism, antisemitism, Islamophobia and xenophobia, and to combat all forms of racial discrimination and intolerance related to it."

In 2014 Integrationsverket (the Swedish National Integration Board) defined Islamophobia as "racism and discrimination expressed towards Muslims."

== Criticism of the term ==
Although the term "Islamophobia" is now widely recognised and used, its construction, use, and wider application have been criticised. Some critics argue that the term is an obstacle to constructive criticism of Islam, fearing it may be applied to any form of critique of Islamic beliefs or practices. As a result, alternative terms such as "anti-Muslim" or "Muslimophobia" have been suggested.

=== Critiques of the Runnymede framework ===
The classification of "closed" and "open" views introduced in the 1997 Runnymede report has been criticised as an oversimplification of a complex issue by scholars including Chris Allen, Fred Halliday, and Kenan Malik. Professor Mohammad H. Tamdgidi (University of Massachusetts, Boston) endorsed the report’s definition but argued that its list of "open" views risked creating "an inadvertent definitional framework for Islamophilia." He warned that the framework tended to regard Islam monolithically and failed to capture the complex heterogeneity of a historical tradition shaped by multiple, often contradictory, forces.

Halliday further argued that the hostility described by Runnymede targeted Muslims more than Islamic tenets, and therefore a more accurate label would be "anti-Muslimism." He also noted that forms of prejudice differ across nations and cultures, while the Runnymede analysis was focused specifically on Britain. Poole responds that many Islamophobic discourses do in fact target perceived tenets of Islam, while Miles and Brown argue that "the existence of different 'Islamophobias' does not invalidate the concept of Islamophobia any more than the existence of different racisms invalidates the concept of racism."

=== Conceptual ambiguity ===
Several scholars have noted the lack of definitional clarity. In 2011 Erik Bleich wrote that "there is no widely accepted definition of Islamophobia that permits systematic comparative and causal analysis," and suggested "indiscriminate negative attitudes or emotions directed at Islam or Muslims" as a possible definition.

British academic Salman Sayyid has argued that such criticisms amount to "etymological fundamentalism," echoing early objections to terms such as racism and antisemitism, which were also accused of being conceptually weak or of restricting free speech.

=== Free speech and legal concerns ===
A further criticism is that the term can be used to stifle debate. The French philosopher Pascal Bruckner called it "a clever invention because it amounts to making Islam a subject that one cannot touch without being accused of racism." In 2025 Kemi Badenoch, the leader of the Conservative Party in the UK, said that legislating a definition for Islamophobia might hamper the freedom to criticise religion by introducing an anti-blasphemy law "through the back door". The Organisation of Islamic Cooperation has similarly been criticised for restricting freedom of speech and freedom of religion by classifying apostasy and heresy as Islamophobia.

== See also ==
- Al-Baqara 256 – Quranic verse saying there is no compulsion in religion
- Criticism of Islam
- Gendered Islamophobia – Gender-differentiated discrimination against Muslims
- Hijabophobia – Fear or hatred against Muslim women who wear hijab
- International Day to Combat Islamophobia – Worldwide annual observance
- Islamophobia in the media
- Islamophobia Watch – Islamophobia watchdog website
- Islamophobic trope – False or maliciously exaggerated claims about Muslims and Islam
- Minority stress – Type of stress faced by minority groups
- Nativism (politics) – Policy of protecting the interests of established inhabitants against those of immigrants
- Nativism (politics) in the United States
- Peace in Islam
- Persecution of Muslims
- Religious abuse – Abuse administered through religion
- Religious intolerance – Intolerance of another's religious beliefs or practices
- Religious persecution – Persecution based on religious belief
- Religious violence – Violence practiced in the name of religion
- Religious war – War primarily over religious differences
  - 7/7 Attacks – Islamist suicide terrorist attacks
  - 9/11 – 2001 terror attacks in the United States
- Supremacism § Islamic
- Antisemitism – Hostility, prejudice, or discrimination against Jews
- World Hijab Day – Annual awareness event on 1 February
