= International Day to Combat Islamophobia =

Worldwide annual observance

- Official name: International Day to Combat Islamophobia
- Observed by: Worldwide
- Liturgical color: Green
- Type: United Nations Declaration
- Observances: International
- Date: 15 March
- Next time: 15 March 2027
- Duration: One day
- Frequency: Annual
- Related to: Islam

The International Day to Combat Islamophobia is an international observance designated by United Nations in 2022, taking place on 15 March every year worldwide to counter Islamophobia. The date was chosen as the anniversary of the mass shootings in Christchurch, New Zealand, in which 51 people were killed during Friday prayer in 2019.

== Background ==
Islam is the second-largest religion in the world after Christianity, with about over 2 billion followers – about 26% of the world population. Islamophobia is the unreasonable dislike or fear of, and prejudice against, Muslims or Islam.

Throughout history, various incidences of ethnic cleansing and suppression of Muslims have occurred around the world, such as the Circassian genocide, the Srebrenica massacre, and the Sabra and Shatila massacre, and ongoing conflicts include the Rohingya, Uyghur, and Palestine conflicts. Islamophobia escalated after the September 11 attacks, which caused great distress to Muslims in Europe and the United States.

In 2020, addressing the general debate of Seventy-fifth session of the United Nations General Assembly, the former Prime Minister of Pakistan, Imran Khan first time suggested an international day to combat Islamophobia

== Official recognition ==
On 15 March 2022, the United Nations General Assembly adopted a resolution by consensus which was introduced by Imran Khan, Permanent Representative of Pakistan to the UN, on behalf of the Organisation of Islamic Cooperation that proclaimed March 15 as 'International Day to Combat injustice towards Islam.

== See also ==
- World Hijab Day
