= Chris Allen (academic) =

British sociologist (born 1966)

Chris Allen (born 1966) is a British sociologist and associate professor at the Centre for Hate Studies based in the Department of Criminology at the University of Leicester. He was named by the Deutsche Welle as an expert on the topic of contemporary Islamophobia.

== Early life ==
Chris Allen was born in Bermondsey, London. He received a B.A. in religious studies from University of Wolverhampton in 2001, and a Ph.D. in theology from the University of Birmingham in 2006.

== Career ==
Allen worked for a year as a Research and Policy Assistant at the Markfield Institute of Higher Education associated with The Islamic Foundation. He was a visiting lecturer at the University of Wolverhampton for 3 years, the Director of Research and Policy at an N.G.O in Birmingham called Brap for 3 years, and University Lecturer at the University of Birmingham between 2009 and 2018. Since 2018, he has been an associate professor in the Centre for Hate Studies based in the Department of Criminology, University of Leicester.

Allen's research focuses on Islamophobia, British and European Far Right and, more broadly, religiously motivated hate.

== Research into Islamophobia ==
Shortly after the events of 9/11 he coauthored, along with Jorgen S. Nielsen, a report on "Islamophobia in the EU after 11 September 2001" for the European Monitoring Centre on Racism and Xenophobia. Published in May 2002, the report concluded that "a greater receptivity towards anti-Muslim and other xenophobic ideas and sentiments" had come to be more tolerated. At the same time, the report acknowledged that "there were very few serious [anti-Muslim] attacks" and that Islamophobia "manifested itself in quite basic and low-level ways." However, Allen later stated that there was a "concerted effort" by some to dismiss the report's data on this account. He also stated that the focus in the number of Islamophobic incidents or severity of them minimizes the fact that the hate, prejudice, and discrimination that Muslims face negatively affects their lives.

In 2012, he was asked to be on the board of "a cross-government working group to tackle anti-Muslim hatred". He later resigned from the group.

== Works ==
- Islamophobia (Ashgate, 2010) ISBN 978-0754651390
