= Deepa Kumar =

Indian-American academic

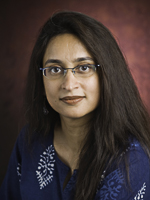
- Deepa Kumar, May 2006
- Occupations: Professor of Journalism and Media Studies, Rutgers University, writer
- Writing career
- Subjects: US imperialism; islamophobia and anti-Muslim racism; neoliberalism and class; gender and media
- Movements: Anti-war movement, Anti-Islamophobia, Occupy Wall Street
- Website: deepakumar.net

Deepa Kumar is an Indian American scholar and activist. She is a professor of Journalism and Media Studies at Rutgers University. Kumar has been referred to by the Media Education Foundation as “one of the nation’s foremost scholars on Islamophobia" and by The New York Times as "a world-renowned scholar of Islamophobia and race." She is a leader in the Rutgers faculty union, the AAUP-AFT. When she was president, the union fought for gender and race equity, and in 2019 won a contract that AFT president, Randi Weingarten, said “will inspire higher education professionals across [the] country to fight and win their own battles to improve their lives – and the lives of others – in the streets and at the bargaining table.”

== Education and career ==
Kumar has a master's degree in Mass Communication from Bowling Green State University after earning her post-bachelor's B.S. (Communications) from Bangalore University. She earned her Ph.D. at the University of Pittsburgh.

She is a professor of Journalism and Media Studies at Rutgers University where she teaches courses such as "Gender, Race, and Empire." In 2020, she was one of five female tenured professors to file a lawsuit against Rutgers accusing the university of paying them less than their male counterparts.

== Writings ==
=== Media Representations of Labor ===
==== Outside the Box: Corporate Media, Globalization, and the UPS Strike ====
Kumar's 2008 book Outside the Box looks at the need for a critical analysis of how labor struggles are presented and packaged by the corporate media by examining the United Parcel Service strike of 1997, led by the International Brotherhood of Teamsters.

=== Writings on Islamophobia, Political Islam, and Empire ===
==== Islamophobia and the Politics of Empire ====
The first edition (2012) of Islamophobia and the Politics of Empire made the case that the Bush administration's "war on terror" ushered in an era of anti-Muslim racism, or Islamophobia, after the September 11 attacks. Kumar argues that that tragedy did not create the image of the "Muslim enemy." She sheds light on the long history of anti-Muslim racism and the agenda of empire building in the West with a particular focus on the US. The second edition (2021) titled Islamophobia and the Politics of Empire: 20 Years after 9/11 traces the history of anti-Muslim racism from the early modern era to the War on Terror. This is an updated and completely revised second edition that brings her analysis up to the Trump presidency.

==== Danish cartoons ====
Following the Jyllands-Posten Muhammad cartoons controversy which attempted to depict the Islamic Prophet Muhammed in a caricatural light, Kumar wrote an article against the publication of the cartoons titled "Danish Cartoons: Racism Has No Place on the Left," where she argues that the left's criticism of Muslim outrage is actually a form of anti-Muslim racism. The article attracted criticism, and in response Kumar wrote another article in the Monthly Review, titled "Fighting Islamophobia: A Response to Critics".

==== Green Scare ====
Kumar coined the term "Green Scare" (where green refers to the color of Islam rather than environment activists) to talk about the process of fear mongering analogous to the Red Scare of the McCarthyite period. This was in response to the media portrayal of the "homegrown threat" of Muslim Americans after a 2009 small increase in the number of Muslim Americans expressing support for extremist Islamists or carrying out attacks; she noted that "there has been a steady and dramatic decline since 2004, with only a slight increase in this overall trend in 2009."

==== Political Islam ====
Kumar takes a historical approach to her analysis of the parties of political Islam. She states that Islamist parties have risen to prominence over the last three decades of the 20th century for various reasons: "the active role played by the U.S. in posing Islam and political Islam as an alternative to secular nationalism and the left; persistent imperial intervention and domination; internal weakness that led to the decline of secular nationalist and various left parties, creating an ideological vacuum that Islamists were able to occupy; economic crises and its exacerbation under the neoliberal era, which present an economic opening for Islamists and their charitable networks."

Kumar has criticized the automatic designation of Islamist groups like Hamas as Foreign Terrorist Organizations (FTOs) noting that it is a political party that has the support of Palestinians because it has taken up "the mantle of national resistance against Israeli occupation of Palestinian lands." While she critiques its "reactionary" politics and attitudes towards women as well as its policing of "immorality," she points out that it came to power through generally recognized free and fair elections in 2006. She argues that it is for the people of Palestine to decide who should govern them, not Israel or the United States.

In 2017, Kumar's lecture "Constructing the Terrorist Threat: Islamophobia, the Media & the War on Terror" was published by the Media Education Foundation as part of their series on media, culture, and the Middle East.

== Awards and recognition ==
In 2016 Kumar was recognized with the Dallas Smythe Award, presented by the Union for Democratic Communications "to an outstanding and influential scholar working in the critical political economic tradition of Dallas Smythe."

She has also received two awards from the American Association of University Professors, the Georgina M. Smith Award in 2016, and the Marilyn Sternberg Award in 2020.
