= Muslims in British media =

Representation of British Muslims within the British media

The representation of British Muslims within the British media has been a matter of considerable public concern over recent years. The sociologist Tariq Modood suggests that British Muslims are portrayed as an "alien other" within the media and this misrepresentation paves the way for the development of a "racism", namely, "Islamophobia" which stems from the cultural representations of the "other". The themes of "deviance" and "un-Britishness", Modood continues, are sought in the treatment of British Muslims and Islam and may be related to the issues of Orientalism.

== National and international concern ==
The role of media in representing minorities is highly crucial when audiences are in little contact with them. The sociologist Tariq Modood suggests that British Muslims are portrayed as an "alien other" by British media and this paves the way for the development of "Islamophobia" which stems from the cultural representations of the "other". The themes of "deviance" and "un-Britishness", Modood continues, are also sought in the treatment of British Muslims and Islam.

British Muslims are heterogeneous, with different ethnic backgrounds, distinguished from other social categories such as "British" or "Christian". This heterogeneity has been more intertwined with a wide diversity of political, cultural and socioeconomic factors. Comprehensive research studies accomplished in the UK on the concept of "national identity" reveal that minority groups in the UK are thought of "un-British". Recent cultural debates and round-table discussions held by Media experts in a quest for knowing "who is and who is not British" have also attached more significance to the theme of minority marginalization in the media.

== West and the rest ==
Professor Edward Said's metaphorical expression of "a double-edged sword" signifies that how the media in its representation of minority groups first "marginalize minority voices", then, they are "virtually ignored or invisible". This misrepresentation is backed by negative discourses giving in practice a false account of the minorities. According to Said the press portrayal of British Muslims as the "alien within British culture" dates back to the rise of Western imperialism from which a political dichotomy of "West" versus "East" was constructed.

In his book Orientalism Said explores the relationships between the "West" and the "Rest" and Muslims in particular. Focusing on the Middle East as a transcontinental region he exposes how in power relations and dynamics a sharp difference is observed between "the familiar Europe or the West and the strange, the Orient or the East".

A complexity of reasons, media experts say, must be considered to understand why the Western media have taken an "unsympathetic" stance on Muslims or Islam. Said found one problem in connection with the narrator rather than the narrative. He argues the West has its "own experts" and commentators to represent the East, since "they are not representing themselves".

Akbar Ahmed, American-Pakistani author and analyst, has noted that the negative representation of Islam and Muslims by the Western media is increasingly growing after such incidents as the Rushdie affair, the first Gulf War and 9/11 attacks.

== Media and race ==
Academic studies demonstrate a strong correlation between the challenges associated with "immigration and asylum" and the fundamental concepts of race and nation, as portrayed in the British media. The concept of nation in Western terminology implies "a national culture ethnically pure and homogeneous in its whiteness", but the existence of non-white communities within the White society, Saeed argues, has semantically deconstructed the conventional norms of social integrity.

Journalist Roy Greenslade claims that Britain raises concern about the emergence of a multi-cultural "non-white society" in its approach to the questions of "asylum and immigration". Throughout the years the word minorities have been presented by the media in a derogatory sense as they are usually connected with the negative themes of "conflict, controversy and deviance".

Today we are witnessing the rise of an institutional "racism", which has in core a concern about such issues as "Islamic fundamentalist terrorism", "asylum seekers" and "illegal refugees". This dynamic form of racism can be adapted to different situations and circumstances.

American political scientist Samuel Huntington in his book The Clash of Civilizations and the Remaking of World Order explicates "Islamic fundamentalism" is not the main concern for the West. It is in fact Islam, "a different civilization whose people are convinced of the superiority of their culture" and that how they are afraid of losing their power. On the same principle, Hartmann and Husband suggest that it is not "race" but "racism" that has caused a problem for the UK and its media.

Islam, British writer Ziauddin Sardar concludes, has refused to comply with the West in implementing the "universal project of globalization" characterized by Western values. This refusal is highly symptomatic of a constant threat to the "Western's free and democratic World".

== See also ==
- Islamophobia in the United Kingdom
- Islamophobia in the media
