= Forum Against Islamophobia and Racism =

London-based Muslim advocacy and lobbying group

- Registration no.: 1100985
- Headquarters: London, England, UK
- Location: 3 THE AVENUE
- Website: fairuk.org

The Forum Against Islamophobia and Racism (FAIR) was a London-based Muslim advocacy and lobbying group that campaigned against discrimination in the form of Islamophobia and racism. It was established in 2001 as an independent charitable organization with the aim of monitoring media coverage of Islam and Muslims, and challenging examples of Islamophobia through dialogue with media organizations. It produced numerous publications relating to Islamophobia in the United Kingdom. Formed in 2000, Navid Akhtar and Samar Mashadi have been directors of FAIR.

== Aims and activities ==
According to the group's mission statement, it was set up "for the purpose of raising awareness of and combating Islamophobia and racism, monitoring specific incidents of Islamophobia and racism, working towards eliminating religious and racial discrimination, campaigning and lobbying on issues relevant to Muslim and other multi-ethnic communities in Britain."

FAIR was active in campaigning for passing of the Racial and Religious Hatred Act 2006 which outlawed the incitement towards religious hatred in Britain. They issued a memorandum in 2002 entitled "The Religious Offences Bill: A Response" to the House of Lords Select Committee in which they raised a number of publications by the far-right British National Party inciting hatred against Islam and the Muslim community in Britain, stating that this exposed a loophole in British law wherein some communities were protected from incitement to hatred whilst others were not. In 2003, FAIR reported 29 incidents of assault or attacks against Muslims for that year, though they believe many went unreported. This included attacks on Muslim women and people wearing traditional Muslim clothes, as well as vandalism of mosques and Islamic centers. Also reported were desecration of Muslim graves.

In 2004, the FAIR carried out a survey in association with the Muslim College and the Al-Khoei Foundation which found that since the September 11 attacks, 80 percent of Muslims surveyed reported being subjected to Islamophobia; 68 percent believed they had been treated and perceived differently; and 32 percent reported being discriminated against at airports in the United Kingdom. FAIR have also co-organised events and demonstrations alongside the Muslim Council of Britain (MCB) and the National Assembly of Black People.

FAIR was dissolved on May 24, 2016.

== Publications ==
- Counter-Terrorism Powers: Reconciling Security and Liberty in an Open Society: Discussion Paper- A Muslim Response. (2004), London
- A Response to the Government Consultation Paper, 'Towards Equality and Diversity: Implementing the Employment and Race Directives.' (2002) London.
