= Islamophobia Watch =

Islamophobia watchdog website

Islamophobia Watch was a website which was initiated in January 2005 as a non-profit project to document material in the media, and in society at large, which it perceives to advocate Islamophobia. The site ceased by the end of January 2015.

The website was set up by two non-Muslim socialists, Eddie Truman and Bob Pitt. Truman was at that time press officer for the Scottish Socialist Party group at the Scottish Parliament, and Pitt worked as a researcher in the office of the then Mayor of London, Ken Livingstone.

== Features ==
Islamophobia Watch is described in the paper "Cyber-Islamophobia? The case of WikiIslam" as representing Muslim efforts against Islamophobic discourse on the Internet. Its homepage contains information about outbursts of anti-Muslim opinion expressed in modern society. Discussion including issues relating to "anti-Muslim opinions related to the veil, the London bombings, leftist groups, liberalists, multiculturalism, secularism, right-wing extremism and so-called women’s issues" are presented in detail. The homepage also provides specific information about various authors, including Tariq Ramadan, Yusuf Qardawi, and Oriana Fallaci. It also possesses a "News Digest" which provides readers with coverage of "the top issues in the media relating to Islamophobia and racism in the UK."

== Support ==
Islamophobia Watch had been welcomed by the Muslim community, who saw it as a useful resource in combating what they consider as anti-Muslim bigotry. It received an honourable mention in the "Best Non-Muslim Blog" category in the 2005 Brass Crescent Awards.

== Criticism ==
Martin Bright, former political editor of the New Statesman and author of the Policy Exchange pamphlet "When Progressives Treat with Reactionaries: The British State's Flirtation with Radical Islamism", has drawn a parallel between Islamophobia Watch and the extreme right. Responding to an article by Holocaust denier Lady Michèle Renouf that denounced him as part of a "Zionist conspiracy", Bright commented that Renouf's piece was "almost indistinguishable from the attacks on me from supporters of Ken Livingstone and the likes of Islamophobia Watch". The organisation has also been criticized by Maryam Namazie of One Law for All, who wrote: "the likes of the Stop the War Coalition, the Socialist Workers' Party, Unite Against Fascism, Islamophobia Watch, and the Respect Party...are there as prefects to silence dissenters and defend Islamism as a defence of 'Muslims'."

== Controversy ==
During the 2008 London mayoral election campaign Islamophobia Watch came under attack from the London Evening Standard. An editorial complained that the website had attempted to discredit Ken Livingstone's Conservative challenger Boris Johnson by highlighting the fact that the far-right British National Party had called on its supporters to cast a second-preference vote for Johnson. An accompanying article by Keith Dovkants claimed that Islamophobia Watch was seen as "a tool of Ken's political machine" because it gave favourable coverage to Livingstone's role in combating Islamophobia.

== Split ==
For reasons that have not been made public, in 2013 Truman and Pitt parted ways. Truman continued to run the original site at islamophobia-watch.com, while Pitt established a new operation at islamophobiawatch.co.uk, both of which ceased by the end of January 2015.
