= Godlia kino meeting controversy =

1995 political controversy in Norway

On 2 September 1995, just before the electoral campaign for the 1995 Norwegian local elections, a meeting was held by the Norwegian Association (Norwegian: Den Norske Forening) that would turn controversial. The meeting was attended by many nationalist and far-right organisations, but caused controversy because the profiled Progress Party Member of Parliament Øystein Hedstrøm was revealed to have been present and held a speech at the meeting.

== Events ==
On 3 September 1995, the newspaper Dagbladet published photos of Hedstrøm holding a speech about immigration at an allegedly secret meeting at the movie theatre Godlia kino in Oslo. The journalists who had investigated the meeting were Arne O. Holm, Cato Vogt-Kielland and Thor Gjermund Eriksen. The meeting, which went under the name "Year of the grasshoppers" (Gresshoppenes år), was attended by 24 persons, including Bastian Heide, Jack Erik Kjuus, Bjarne Dahl, Erik Gjems-Onstad and Hege Søfteland. The initiator to the meeting was the nationalist organisation the Norwegian Association, which was led by Torfinn Hellandsvik.

The newspaper bulletin created shockwaves into the political community. The Progress Party chairman, Carl I. Hagen, had not known that Hedstrøm had participated at the meeting. Hagen immediately quieted Hedstrøm, and distanced himself from the Norwegian Association. Hedstrøm was also stripped of his position as Spokesperson of Immigration Issues. Hagen stated that "Hedstrøm has made a big mistake", and Hedstrøm withdrew from the public scene.

After a few days, Hagen changed his opinion and stated that Hedstrøm had done nothing else than attending the meeting as a private person. It also reached surface that other politicians from the Progress Party, such as Deputy Chairman Vidar Kleppe, and Member of Parliament Fridtjof Frank Gundersen had also attended meetings hosted by the Norwegian Association. According to the newspaper Aftenposten, Hedstrøm had also had long-term contact with organisations such as the Fatherland Party and Stop Immigration. It also became known that the leader of the Norwegian Association, Torfinn Hellandsvik, had been the premise supplier for a parliamentary document about immigration that Hedstrøm had prepared.

The attention around this case, together with focus on immigration, resulted in a markedly increased support for the Progress Party in the 1995 local elections.
