= Fatherland Party (Norway) =

Fatherland Party Fedrelandspartiet
- Leader: Arild Kibsgaard
- Founder: Harald Trefall
- Founded: 17 May 1990
- Dissolved: 31 December 2008
- Headquarters: Bergen
- Youth wing: Fatherland Youth
- Ideology: Norwegian nationalism Social conservatism Euroscepticism
- Nordic affiliation: NordNat (1997–99)
- Colours: Red, White, Blue

Website
- www.fedrelandspartiet.no (defunct)

The Fatherland Party (Norwegian: Fedrelandspartiet, FLP) was a political party in Norway, which was founded by former local Progress Party politician Harald Trefall in 1990. Primarily based in Western Norway, the party supported nationalist positions such as opposition to immigration and the European Union. It got two representatives elected to public office in the 1991 local elections, in a county and municipal council respectively. The party never won representation since, and was dissolved in 2008 after years of electoral inactivity.

== History ==
The FLP was founded on 17 May 1990 by Harald Trefall, a member of Folkebevegelsen mot innvandring (FMI) and former Bergen city councillor for the Progress Party. He became noted in the late 1980s for his opposition to immigration, and was the first candidate for the Stop Immigration party in Hordaland in 1989. In one of the earliest notable acts by the party, it put an ad in the Christian newspaper Dagen, where it called for Christians to fight together with the party to stop Norway from becoming "a Muslim country". In its first election, the 1991 local elections, it won one representative on the municipal council of Karmøy Municipality, and one representative in the Hordaland county council. The party won 0.5% of the vote in the 1993 parliamentary election, and combined with Stop Immigration more than 15,000 votes. Trefall stepped down as leader of the party in 1994 after "six years of resistance struggle against immigration," although he would remain chairman of the party's so-called Council.

In the aftermath of the 1995 Norwegian Association meeting at Godlia kino, it was revealed that Øystein Hedstrøm, Member of Parliament and Spokesperson on Immigration Issues for the Progress Party, had held long-term contacts with the FLP. There had also allegedly been talks of a joint list between the parties for the upcoming election, talks which nevertheless never went through. When opinion polls had shown that the FLP could win one or two local seats in Bergen, local politicians from all the other represented parties in the city (except the Progress Party) issued a public "warning" against the party. In the 1995 local elections, the FLP failed to defend its elected representatives, nor to win any new ones. In Oslo, the party cooperated with the Stop Immigration party in the Fellesliste mot fremmedinnvandring, to no success. When it was revealed that Jack Erik Kjuus succeeded his Stop Immigration party with the White Electoral Alliance and introduced a far more radical program, the FLP immediately distanced itself from the new program and broke all cooperation with Kjuus and his group. From 1997 to 1999, the FLP was part of the Nordic NordNat organisation, which included the Sweden Democrats.

In the 1997 parliamentary election, the party was reduced to 0.1% of the national vote, and was even more marginalised in the 1999 local elections. It gained competition from the new Norwegian People's Party (NFP) for the 2001 parliamentary election, which left its support split between the two parties. The NFP had planned to merge with the FLP the year before, but according to the former party's leader Oddbjørn Jonstad, Trefall had made organisational demands he refused to agree on. The FLP did not contest the 2005 parliamentary election, while many of its members, including its deputy chairman, rather ran for the Democrats.

== Political profile ==
The FLP was a self-described nationalist party, that wanted to "preserve the national interests of Norway, and defend and develop the Christian heritage (by a democratic foundation)." The party wanted Norway to remain a Norwegian nation-state, and opposed membership of the European Union as well as mass immigration, claiming both to be unconstitutional. The party also claimed that the "forced introduction" of a multicultural society was a violation of the human rights of the Norwegian people in terms with the international conventions of the United Nations. The party sought a global community of independent people in their own native countries, claiming a world community of independent nations to be "the best foundation for world peace." The party also wanted to strengthen the family, improve conditions for the elderly, keep a strong defence and law and order.

While the party was accused by some of being "neo-Nazi" and "racist", many of its members where in fact former members of the Norwegian resistance movement during the Second World War. They included Erik Gjems-Onstad who was part of Kompani Linge, and Oslo candidates Jan Høeg who was part of Milorg and Arvid Austad who participated in the execution squads against convicted Nazi traitors (including Vidkun Quisling) in the legal purge after the war. Austad expanded on his position in 1999, by stating that he saw "clear parallels" between the Nazi invasion of Norway and "today's great immigration of Muslims."

== Election results ==
=== Parliamentary elections ===
Year	Result #	Result %	Seats
1993	11,694	0.5% #10	0
1997	3,805	0.1% #12	0
2001	2,353	0.1% #14	0

=== Local elections ===
Year	County #	County %	C. seats	Municipal #	Municipal %	M. seats
1991	3,700	0.2%	1	1,600	0.1%	1
1995	3,644	0.2%	0	1,360	0.1%	0
1999	1,296	0.1%	0	227	0.0%	0

=== School elections ===
In school elections the party generally had a greater approval rating than in ordinary ones, with its strongest county-wide result in Sogn og Fjordane in 1995 when it got 6.2% of the votes. The best country-wide school election was in 1993 when it won 2.5% of the national vote. In the 1991 school elections the party received up to 30% of the votes in certain vocational upper secondary schools in Rogaland. In 1993, it received 41% of the vote at an upper secondary school in Valdres.

== Party leaders ==
- Harald Trefall (1990–1994)
- Odd Even Hårvik (1994–1996)
- Harald Trefall (1996–2002)
- Arild Kibsgaard (2002–2008)

== Symbols ==
Logo used in 1993 (without colours).

Logo used in 2001.
