= Hege Søfteland =

Norwegian politician

Hege Søfteland (born 25 July 1959) is a Norwegian nationalist politician and immigration opponent.

A former member of the Conservative Party and Progress Party, she has since the late 1980s been present in numerous anti-immigration, far-right and nationalist parties. She was a member of Stop Immigration until 1989 when she was excluded together with Erik Gjems-Onstad and her cohabitant Torfinn Hellandsvik. For the 1991 election she led the short-lived National Democrats, and was later active in the National Alliance, as well as the organization Norwegian League. She is currently a member of the Democrats, and ran for the 2009 election as the party's 7th candidate in Oslo.

At a 1992 television debate, she refused to handshake Aslam Ahsan, leader of the Pakistani Labour Union, and among other things stated that "Gro Harlem Brundtland is the biggest country betrayer since World War II". She has otherwise compared immigration to Norway with the Nazi occupation of Norway. She is a self-declared nationalist, but as the newspaper Aftenposten had called the infamous 1995 Norwegian League meeting at Godlia kino a "Nazi meeting", she however denied being a racist, and said that it is "terribly stigmatising to be called a Nazi [...] because we are critical of the Norwegian immigration policy".
