= Oddbjørn Jonstad =

Norwegian politician

Oddbjørn Jonstad (born 22 January 1944) is a Norwegian politician. He started his political career in 1987 when he was elected to the municipal council of Oppegård Municipality for the Progress Party, and became the leader of the local chapter in 1995. In 1999 he however came in conflict with the party leadership due to some controversial proposals he made on immigration-issues, which eventually led to his expulsion from the party. He then went on to found the Norwegian People's Party, which did not win public representation.

== Political career ==
Jonstad was elected to the municipal council of Oppegård Municipality for the Progress Party in 1987, and became leader of the local chapter in 1995. In 1994 Jonstad proposed to introduce mandatory birth control education for refugees, mainly because they "make more children than they can support," as he had outlined in articles in Østlandets Blad. The Progress Party chairman Carl I. Hagen in turn said he agreed with the "main views" of Jonstad. Other proposals made by Jonstad in the municipal council was to make Oppegård a "Socialist-Free Zone".

Jonstad came in conflict with the leadership of the party in 1999 after he proposed to put asylum seekers and refugees in "camps", and to establish schools inside the camps for the children of refugees. Carl I. Hagen soon distanced himself from Jonstad's policies. Jonstad was then suspended from the party on 1 September, and expelled on 17 September after he additionally had worked to create a new party, the Norwegian People's Party. Although he still topped the Progress Party electoral list for the early September local elections, enough Progress Party voters had written him off the list so that he was not elected. Jonstad's new party won just 0.1% of the vote in the 2001 parliamentary election, and in the 2003 local elections he instead headed the local Democrats' list in Oppegård due to a lack of resources (also to no success).

He has later been the contact person of Folkebevegelsen mot innvandring for Oslo and Akershus, and in 2017 had his home raided by the police.

== Personal life ==
Jonstad was born in Naustdal Municipality, Sogn og Fjordane, but moved to Oppegård Municipality, Akershus in 1979. He is educated a civil engineer, and has written four books of Oppegård-related local history, as well as a local pictorial encyclopedia. After his departure from partisan politics, he has been the leader of the Norwegian Privacy Association (Norsk personvernforening), and has criticised what he has seen as certain misuse of surveillance cameras. Since 2008 he has hosted various websites where he publishes lists of people he considers to "support immigration and Islamisation."
