= Harald Trefall =

Norwegian experimental physicist and politician

Harald Trefall (10 November 1925 – 14 March 2008) was a Norwegian professor of experimental physics and far-right politician. He graduated from and worked at the University of Bergen, where he focused his work on cosmic radiation, and held a Ph.D. from the University of Oslo. His political career started as a Bergen city councillor for the Progress Party in 1983, until he left the party in 1986 and finished his term as an independent. He worked within various anti-immigration organisations in the late 1980s, and founded the Fatherland Party in 1990. He was a Hordaland county councillor for this new party from 1991 to 1995.

== Professional career and life ==
Trefall was born in Bergen on 10 November 1925. He graduated with a degree in mathematics and natural sciences at the University of Bergen in 1951, with an average of 1.21 or "exceptionally well". He became amanuensis at the same university in 1955, docent of physics in 1957, and was appointed professor of experimental physics from 1 April 1964. He obtained a Ph.D. from the University of Oslo in 1961 for six dissertations concerning topics within cosmic radiation. His initial academic area was cosmic radiation, but in 1962 he started researching X-ray phenomena brought forth by electron bombardment of the upper atmosphere in the zone of the polar aurora. He became internationally known for his balloon experiments at the Physics Institute at the University of Bergen, and initiated a cooperation with the Max Planck Institute of West Germany in the early 1960s. He retired as professor in 1995. Trefall died 82 years old in March 2008.

== Political career ==
Trefall started his political career in the 1983 local elections when he was elected as a city councillor for the Progress Party in Bergen. He left the party in 1986 because he thought that it no longer followed its own political program, and claimed that he finished his term by only representing the party's program, rather than its party group. He believed that the party really wanted to open the borders, and that its policy thus was too liberal with regards to immigration. Trefall was one of the founders of Folkebevegelsen mot innvandring (FMI) in 1987. For the 1989 parliamentary election, he headed the list of the Stop Immigration party in Hordaland. He founded the Fatherland Party in 1990, and was elected as a Hordaland county councillor following the 1991 local elections. In 1993, he was part of a joint Scandinavian meeting of immigration opponents in Oslo, where notably Denmark's Mogens Glistrup was egged and beaten up by youth from the Blitz movement and SOS Rasisme.

== Political views ==
Trefall's main political concern was the recent immigration to Norway. He considered the new ethnic groups to be a threat to Norwegian homogeneity, and believed that it would be devastating for the country in the long run. His solution for helping those in need, was to support them in local refugee camps, rather than letting them come to Norway. Although he stated that all humans were of equal worth, he voiced support for nativism, arguing that each country's native citizens should be given special preferential rights in relation to migrants and refugees.

He was also opposed to the European Economic Community (later the European Union), which he believed would eventually collapse like the Soviet Union. He thought that the principle of open borders would destroy the common fellowship and good camaraderie between countries. In 2001 he argued that the demand voiced by Lars Sponheim for increased work-based immigration to Norway was evocative of the "slave-owner ideology" of former colonial societies, such as the slaveholding United States. In addition, he held that Thorbjørn Jagland expressed racist attitudes when he promoted immigration to Norway in order to make immigrants take the "dirty jobs" Norwegians would not accept. He maintained that the immigrants in turn would become just as selective as the Norwegians, which in turn would require a corresponding increase of immigration.
