= European Defence League =

Organization

- Abbreviation: EDL
- Founder: Tommy Robinson
- Type: Far-right
- Purpose: Anti-Islamism,
- Location: England, United Kingdom

The European Defence League (EDL) is a largely UK-based offshoot of the English Defence League founded which campaigns against what it considers sharia law and itself has various offshoots. The group, founded by Tommy Robinson, was set up in October 2010 and held its first demonstration that month in Amsterdam, Netherlands, at the trial of Dutch anti-Islam politician Geert Wilders.

== Dutch Defence League ==
Dutch Defence League logo

The Dutch Defence League was a Dutch offshoot of the English Defence League and member of the European Defence League. The organisation's spokesman was Bert Jansen.

=== EDL offshoot ===
The DDL was affiliated with EFI, the European Freedom Initiative, and with English Defence League offshoots in other countries. Although many followers support The Freedom Party from Geert Wilders, they are not affiliated. In February, members of the DDL attended an English Defence League march in Luton, England. On 13 June 2011 the group announced the immediate termination of its activities.

=== Controversy ===
The DDL distances itself from neo-Nazi ideas by explicitly stating the following phrase in their charter; The DDL rejects Nazi-ideologies the same way as it rejects radical Islamism and further it sincerely respects every human being, no matter the race, religion or lifestyle.

In prelude to the demonstration in Amsterdam on 30 October 2010, the media predicted a clash between Ajax hooligans and EDL members who would visit Amsterdam from England. The concern for a clash reached the point to which the mayor decided to move the demonstration to another location, a decision the DDL wanted to fight in court but later reconsidered and refrained from doing so.

=== Demonstrations ===
On 30 October 2010, members of the Dutch Defence League rallied in Amsterdam, together with some English Defence League members, and protested for freedom of speech and in support of Geert Wilders. Wilders, a Dutch politician also against radical Islam, indicated he was not too happy with the demonstration. After the demonstration the city concluded that there were no major problems

== Norwegian Defence League ==
Norwegian Defence League
- Formation: 2010
- Location: Norway
- Website: norwegiandl.info

The Norwegian Defence League is a Norwegian anti-Islam group closely associated with the English Defence League (EDL). The NDL is an offshoot of the European Defence League and was formed around New Year 2010/2011, inspired by the EDL which had been formed in 2009. There were conflicts regarding the leadership of the group, and it was immersed in a struggle involving multiple competing factions in early 2011. The group was eventually led by Lena Andreassen for about a month until she was dismissed by EDL appointed liaison officer Steve Simmons following a failed demonstration that was held on 9 April 2011. The NDL has been headed by a board of administrators since then, and one of its leading figures has been Ronny Alte. Alte said that the group is not far-right or racist and that the NDL seeks to gather people of all races to fight for democracy and freedom of speech, which he said is threatened by "the ideology Islam." He also said that the group is not anti-Islam, but Islam-critical. Alte resigned abruptly both as leader and member of the NDL on 19 April 2012 over a dispute with the rest of the organisation's leadership related to its connection with Anders Behring Breivik. Following Alte's resignation the NDL website was taken offline. Other sources claim that Ronny Alte was removed from his position after refusing to follow advice from the administration team of the NDL. A new website, with the old layout, has appeared at a .info address rather than the old one which was a .com address.

=== EDL offshoot ===
The group uses Facebook for organisation. The NDL had more than 1,300 members on its closed Facebook group by September 2011 and had more than 30,000 likes on its open Facebook page that year. Rivalries existed between several different Facebook groups all vying for the support of the English Defence League, at least until August 2011. One of these were created by Ronny Alte. According to the British anti-fascist Searchlight magazine in a 26 July 2011 press release, the NDL's Facebook page was administered by Steve Simmons who was appointed European Liaison Officer by EDL Leader Tommy Robinson aka Steven Lennon.

=== The role of Anders Behring Breivik ===
Anders Behring Breivik in 2011.

In December 2009 Anders Behring Breivik, the convicted perpetrator of the 2011 Norway attacks, proposed a group similar to the English Defence League in a forum post. It is not known whether Breivik was in fact part of establishing the organisation, although it has been claimed that he was. Whether Breivik actually was a member of the Norwegian Defence League is also debated, as Breivik is said to deny it. Three of the organisation's past leaders said he was a member.

Following the 2011 Norway attacks on 22 July, it was revealed that Anders Behring Breivik had formerly been a member of the NDL. Breivik has been identified as a member of the NDL under the pseudonym "Sigurd Jorsalfar" (after the medieval Norwegian crusader-king Sigurd the Crusader). The first documented initiative for establishing a Norwegian sister organisation to the EDL had also originated in a forum post by Breivik on the Norwegian website Document.no on 6 December 2009. There Breivik proposes to establish a Norwegian version of the English Defence League. Breivik writes that he sees this as the only way to stop left-wing radical groups like Blitz and SOS Rasisme from harassing Norwegian cultural conservatives. According to the newspaper Dagbladet, Breivik however denies to have been a member of the NDL. Lena Andreassen states that Breivik was ejected from the organisation when she took over as leader because he was too extreme, while Ronny Alte and Håvar Krane have said that Breivik left because he thought the group was too mild regarding its methods. Breivik's perceived connection to the NDL is seen as a major problem for the group in the area of recruiting new members.

=== Formation ===
The founding of NDL was inspired by the English Defence League, and took place around New Year 2010/2011. In February 2011, 22-year-old Remi Huseby from Haugesund emerged as its spokesperson during an EDL rally in Luton, England. At this point the group was immersed in conflict, as according to newspaper Dagbladet, reportedly "Nazi sympathizers, nationalists and more moderate opponents of Islam" vied for control over the group. On 28 February the Norwegian Police Security Service (PST) announced it was watching the NDL, which it defined as an "extreme right group." In its annual public threat assessment for 2011, the PST expressed concern about the emergence of groups hostile to Islam. It judged that online activism, particularly in social media, could cause a rise in xenophobia, and that this in turn could lead to polarisation within and between extreme political movements. Furthermore, it stated that an increase in activism could lead to more violence, particularly in connection with political rallies. On 1 March Huseby left the group as he said it had been "overtaken by Nazis."

Later that month, on 19 March, Lena Andreassen became the leader of the group after an internal power-struggle. Having announced in an interview six days earlier that she sought to rid the group of neo-Nazis, she stated in April that such supporters of the group had now been "weeded out" after an internal "Nazi hunt". She said that she had cooperated with the Oslo police to get rid of "unwanted persons", and that she had close contacts with PST. Although in the start-up phase, she announced that the group sought to establish so-called "divisions" in various Norwegian cities. A local Tromsø newspaper iTromsø wrote that a soon-to-resign sergeant in the Home Guard Task Force was "central" in the effort there, although Andreassen denied that he had been given any special role. By 1 April it was reported that the group had in excess of 300 supporters on its Facebook page.

Andreassen stated that "[the NDL] is not against ordinary Muslims, only the fundamentalist groups", and said that the NDL has Muslim members. She has said that the NDL also opposes radical Norwegian extreme right groups. Both Andreassen and former spokesperson Remi Huseby has previously joined the EDL for demonstrations in England. A demonstration was announced for 26 March on the group's web pages. Permission from the police to protest was never sought, and the leader, Andreassen, warned members against taking part.

On 9 April, the day of the anniversary of the German invasion of Norway in 1940, the NDL organised a protest against what it called a "Muslim occupation of Norway" at Akershus Fortress in Oslo. Before the demonstration was held, both the NDL and the police confirmed that the NDL was under threat from both extreme left and extreme right groups, the latter due to their expulsion from the group. The demonstration failed to gather more than a dozen supporters, while a representative of the EDL held a guest appeal. Then-leader Lena Andreassen also gave a speech to the NDL protesters who had turned up. At the same time, an anti-racist counter-protest at Jernbanetorget nearby gathered between 700 and 1,000 people. The police later stated that both demonstrations had been peaceful, and without clashes.

Four days after the demonstration, on 13 April, the EDL broke its ties with the NDL's then-present leadership. Lena Andreassen and her leadership was subsequently thrown out of the group. Andreassen would then resign her membership completely. Following the failed demonstration, Ronny Alte, a high school teacher from Stokke Municipality in Vestfold, was announced as the new leader of the NDL. He stated in an interview in August that ever since the leadership struggle earlier that year, the organisation has been led by five administrators (including Alte), supported by the leadership of the EDL. Alte said that the organisation distances itself from any use of violence, and he also asserted that it has become a gentler organisation than under its previous leadership. He also maintained that the NDL supports the nation of Israel.

=== Infiltration ===
On 11 March 2012 Norwegian tabloid Dagbladet wrote that during 2010 and until the spring of 2011 the leadership of the NDL was infiltrated by members of the left-wing anti-racist group SOS Rasisme. Several anonymous sources told the newspaper that the anti-racists in fact commanded a majority on the board. One of the sources, an SOS Rasisme member, was one of the NDL board members. Another anti-racist, whom the sources named as an NDL board member, denied those claims. The anti-racists were using false identities and were reporting directly back to SOS Rasisme. According to the newspaper, Lena Andreassen who was leader of the NDL in the spring of 2011 didn't know about the infiltration. Ronny Alte, NDL spokesperson as of March 2011, confirmed they had come to realise that there were infiltrators in the NDL in 2011.

In 2013 it was also revealed that NDL had been infiltrated by informants working for the Norwegian Police Security Service. These infiltrators were also able to acquire very central positions, wrote speeches for the official spokesperson and may even have played an important role in establishing a working organisation. The most active of the informants claims to have expelled Anders Behring Breivik from NDL in 2010.

On 4 August 2011, TV 2 revealed that Håvar Krane, a mayoral candidate in Kristiansund Municipality for the marginal, right-wing Democrats party who had served as the leader of the NDL for three weeks during an early transitional period, had talked about his desire of "putting a Glock in the neckhole" of Norwegian Foreign Minister Jonas Gahr Støre and "blocking all the exits with Molotov cocktails" during the government cabinet's Christmas dinner. The secretly recorded informal conversation between Krane and Kaspar Birkeland, another member of the Democrats party and mayoral candidate in neighbouring Ålesund Municipality, had taken place during a meeting in Oslo organised by the Stop Islamisation of Norway group in February 2011.

According to TV 2, an investigation in late August of the electoral lists for the 2011 local elections revealed that eight politicians, representing five different parties, had been members of the NDL's Internet forum. In addition to Krane and Birkeland, also Magnar Tanem, candidate for mayor in Oslo for the Christian Unity Party had been a member of the forum.

=== Resignation of Ronny Alte ===
On 19 April 2012, on the fourth day of the trial of Anders Behring Breivik, Ronny Alte, who had been called to witness for the defence, announced his resignation from both his position on the organisation's leadership group, called the "admins", and from the NDL. Alte claimed that he had wanted to distance himself from Breivik as much as possible but that the rest of the "admin" community had told him not to talk to the media. He said he was considering starting a group of his own.

=== Activities ===
The Norwegian Defence League, in cooperation with SIOE Norway, held its first successful public rally in Stavanger on 23 June 2012. Around 40 people participated according to the police who also called the protest "peaceful". Some counter-protesters, however, were fined for refusing to leave the area. In addition to protesting the "Islamisation of Norway and Europe", the Norwegian parliament's recent decision to change the constitution to relinquish Christianity as state religion and equate all religions was also protested. A counter-rally was organised and police in combat attire physically separated the groups. SOS Rasisme was expelled from the counter-rally and later protested that it was "too passive."

On 28 February 2013, newspaper Verdens Gang wrote that the NDL had published a list of Muslims on its web page. The list had been compiled on the basis of listings in the Public Entity Registry. Lars Johnny Aardal, deputy leader of the NDL, said that it was published "to show the extent of Islam and Muslims in Norway". Former secretary general of the Islamic Council Norway characterised the list as "frightening" and "fear-mongering". Senior scientist at the Norwegian Center for Studies of Holocaust and Religious Minorities, Terje Emberland, told the paper that such a list had only been made once before in Norway, when an anti-semite in the 1930s published a list of Jewish businesses in Norway. He also said that "In this way, the NDL clearly exposes its character, and aligns with the fascist and racist tradition to which it belongs."

== Scottish Defence League ==
The Scottish Defence League (SDL) founded by Ryan Boag Jr is active in Scotland, although some activists in the country identify primarily with the EDL. Like the EDL, the group protested against the murder of Lee Rigby in 2013. It claimed 4,000 members at the time of the murder in May 2013. Aberdeen City Council rejected a bid from the SDL to march on 29 June 2013 due to Armed Forces Day marches on the same day and plans to pass a local mosque. The SDL held a static protest in Pollokshields on 27 July, the birthday of local Kriss Donald, the white victim of Scotland's first-ever race murder in 2004.

== Hogesa ==
Hogesa or Hooligans against Salafists (German: Hooligans gegen Salafisten) is a German street movement mainly originating from right-wing hooligan groups from all over the country. The movement purports to oppose the rise of Salafism in Germany.

Their demonstrations have attracted between roughly 3,000 and 5,000 people. It is an offshoot of the European Defence League, which itself is an offshoot of the English Defence League. Some segments of the media have described the movement as Islamophobic. The majority of the group's organising occurs online.

== Collaborative events ==
Several branches of the European Defence League were launched at an English Defence League demonstration in their home town of Luton in February 2011.

On 31 March 2012, the European Defence League held their first major event, in Aarhus, Denmark. Robinson had hoped for an attendance of 700, although it was later estimated at 160, with only 15 English activists in attendance. Local police made 80 arrests at the rally. The rally also faced a left-wing counter-demonstration. Academic Matthew Goodwin stated that despite the low attendance, the links and networking from the event would be significant.

== See also ==
- Counterjihad
- Criticism of Islam
- Criticism of Islamism
- Islam in Norway
- Hogesa
