= Jørn L. Stang =

Norwegian politician

Jørn Lasse Stang (born 17 January 1959) is a former Norwegian politician and Member of Parliament for the Progress Party.

Stang was born in Sarpsborg. He held various offices for the Østfold, Sarpsborg and Tune chapters of the Progress Party since 1981. Due to internal conflicts within the party, he however left the party on 22 March 2001 and finished his term as an independent. He said his departure was due to the poor treatment of his party colleague Vidar Kleppe.

For the 2001 election he ran as the top candidate for the Østfold List, but was unsuccessful. He later joined the Democrats, and ran as the party's top candidate in Østfold in 2005, again unsuccessfully.

Before the 2010 Swedish general election, Stang joined the Swedish political party Sweden Democrats to help it in the electoral campaign in Strømstad.
