= County lists for the 2001 Norwegian parliamentary election =

The county lists for the Norwegian parliamentary election, 2001 was a group of nine political lists, or parties, which under different names ran for the 2001 parliamentary election in Norway. Common for all the parties, was that all of them were made up of people who had been excluded or voluntarily left the Progress Party after the turmoil that erupted in the party around 2000/2001.

The most noticeable of them were Member of Parliament Vidar Kleppe, who was the top candidate of the Southern Norway List in Vest-Agder, as well as being present on the lists of the Hedmark List and the Hordaland List. Kleppe was noticeably also joined by Elvis impersonator Kjell Elvis, and IK Start football legend Karsten Johannessen in Vest-Agder. Other Progress Party MPs on the county lists were Dag Danielsen and Fridtjof Frank Gundersen, the first and second candidates for the Oslo List, and Jørn Stang who was the top candidate of the Østfold List.

The lists did not campaign as a common party, and even though they had much in common they were formally separate entities. The most successful of the lists was the Southern Norway List of Vidar Kleppe, but neither he managed to secure a renewed place in the Norwegian parliament.

Results for the lists in their respective counties:

List	Norwegian name	County	Result	%
Southern Norway List	Sørlandslista	Vest-Agder	2,407	2.8%
Hordaland List	Hordalandslista	Hordaland	389	0.58%
Southern Norway List Aust-Agder	Sørlandslista Aust-Agder	Aust-Agder	211	0.38%
Oppland List	Opplandslista	Oppland	170	0.16%
Oslo List	Oslo-lista	Oslo	396	0.14%
Østfold List	Østfoldlista	Østfold	179	0.13%
Hedmark List	Hedmarkslista	Hedmark	93	0.09%
Troms List	Tromslista	Troms	70	0.09%
Nordland List	Nordlandslista	Nordland	111	0.09%

Together, the lists received 4.026 votes, accounting for 0,16% of the votes nationwide.

In 2002, the party the Democrats were founded with Vidar Kleppe as the chairman. Many of the members of the county lists joined the new party, though not all. The top candidate for the Troms List, Karl-Olav Slorafoss, was for instance later active in the Coastal Party.
