= National Democrats (Norway, 1991) =

Norwegian political party

The National Democrats (Norwegian: Nasjonaldemokratene) was a political party in Norway, which was founded in January 1990. The party was led by Hege Søfteland, who had been excluded from Stop Immigration. The party's main issue was to stop what it called the "mass immigration to Norway." It also wanted to stop foreign aid and replace it with a "disaster fund", and was against Norway joining the European Economic Community.

By August 1991, the party had 460 registered members. The party contested the 1991 local elections in Oslo, where it received 655 votes. It was though never registered publicly as a political party. The party worked with both the Norwegian Association and Folkebevegelsen mot innvandring.
