= Kjell Elvis =

Norwegian Elvis impersonator (born 1968)

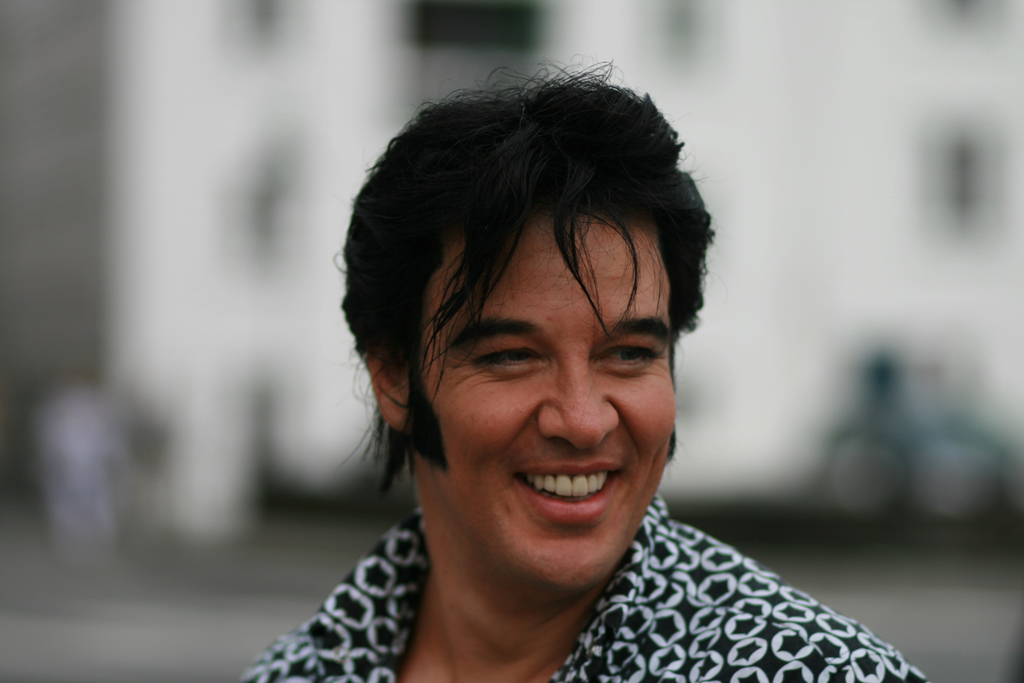
- Elvis in 2008
- Born: Kjell Henning Bjørnestad; 12 March 1968 (age 58)
- Other names: Kjell Elvis; K. Elvis
- Occupation: Elvis impersonator
- Website: elvis.no

Kjell Henning Bjørnestad (born 12 March 1968), known as Kjell Elvis (or K. Elvis), is a Norwegian professional Elvis impersonator – a look-alike who had plastic surgery to look more like American rock 'n' roll musician Elvis Presley. He is also a sound-alike and has released a couple of albums with Elvis songs.

== Biography ==
Kjell Elvis was born in Farsund, raised in Vanse, and currently resides in Lyngdal. While he was in the military in 1988, he started doing some Elvis impersonating. He has had plastic surgery a number of times, to look more like his idol, Elvis Presley, the first one in 1994. In 1997, a media company of Norway, the Norwegian Broadcasting Corporation, showed the documentary Kjell Elvis, about his life as an impersonator. The documentary was also shown in Sweden, Germany and Denmark.

He arranged an Elvis Festival in Kristiansand in Norway in 2001, but it was not an economic success. He arranged a new festival in Oslo in 2002. He is (per August 2003) the only full-time professional Elvis impersonator in Scandinavia.

He broke the world record for singing Elvis hits, in August 2003, when he sang nonstop for 26 hours, four minutes and 40 seconds. The Norwegian Broadcasting Corporation also set a record for themselves, by streaming the whole 26-hour concert on their website.

Kjell Elvis is known for his support of his friend Vidar Kleppe, a former MP for the Progress Party, and in 2001 stated that "if Elvis were alive, he would have voted for the Progress Party". He went on to support Kleppe in the Southern Norway List in the 2001 election, and subsequently Kleppe's Democrats party. For the 2013 parliamentary election he however campaigned for the new The Christians party, citing his support for socially conservative Christian policies.

== Awards and nominations ==
In 1997, he came in sixth place in an Elvis competition in the United States. In 1999 he came second in an unofficial European Championships of Elvis impersonators, that took place in Germany. He won the Nordic Championships in 2001. He was named Europe's best Elvis-impersonator in 2006, and he came in third place at the World Championship for Elvis impersonators in 2006. In 2007, he was a finalist in The Ultimate Elvis Tribute Contest, arranged by Elvis Presley Enterprises.
