= Islamophobia in the United Kingdom =

Islamophobia in the United Kingdom refers to a set of discourses, behaviours and structures which express feelings of hatred, anxiety, fear, hostility and rejection towards Islam or Muslims in the United Kingdom. Islamophobia can manifest itself in a wide range of ways; including, discrimination in the workforce, negative coverage in the media, and violence against Muslims.

== Defining Islamophobia in the United Kingdom ==
Agreement on a legal, meaningful, and actionable definition of the term "Islamophobia" has, to date, proved difficult in the UK. A definition put forward by the All Party Parliamentary Group on British Muslims in May 2019 was rejected by both the police and Government, on the grounds that it was too broad to enforce and had potential consequences for freedom of speech. In an interview with the All Party Parliamentary Group on British Muslims, Professor Peter Hopkins of the centre for Hate Studies at University of Leicester stated that by not adopting a concrete definition for Islamophobia it may "encourage some people to continue to deny that Islamophobia is an issue in society."

== In employment ==
Many studies and surveys have concluded that Muslims face discrimination in the work force. Research in 2014 by Dr Nabil Khattab and Professor Ron Johnston using data from the Office for National Statistics' Labour Force Survey found that "Muslim men were up to 76% less likely to have a job of any kind compared to white, male British Christians of the same age and with the same qualifications." An April 2016 report by Nabil Khattab and Shereen Hussein found that first-generation Muslim women from Bangladesh were over six times more likely to be unemployed than White non-Muslim women when adjusting for factors such as "level of education, family situation and age." First generation Muslim Pakistani and Muslim Black women faced less discrimination but were still four times more likely to be unemployed than White non-Muslim women when adjusting for those same factors.

A September 2017 Social Mobility Commission report concluded that Muslims were being held back in the workplace by widespread Islamophobia, racism and discrimination. Despite outperforming their non-Muslim counterparts in education, Muslims were roughly half as likely to hold higher managerial, administrative, and professional occupations. Almost 50% of Muslim households are considered to be in poverty, compared with less than 20% in the overall population. The report listed barriers to success including negative stereotypes about Muslims, a lack of Muslim staff or role models in the classroom, bullying, and harassment. The report revealed that women wearing hijab face particular discrimination once entering the workplace. Professor Jacqueline Stevenson of Sheffield Hallam University, which led the research, stated that "Muslims are being excluded, discriminated against or failed at all stages of their transition from education to employment."

== In education ==
Islamophobia in schools is a growing concern for the United Kingdom, since projections show there may be an estimated 300,000 Muslim teenagers in the education system by 2021. Various incidents have occurred where students were attacked while near school or on campus. Studies show such actions are increasingly common after trigger incidences such as the Manchester bombing.Women and girls who wear the hijab are particularly targeted. According to the Tell Measuring Anti-Muslim Attacks (Tell MAMA) organisation, it has been reported that around 6% or 53 accounts of reported incidents of Islamophobia have occurred in British educational institutions in 2017. Many of the incidents are associated with bullying and verbal abuse, such as calling a fellow peer a "terrorist" or taunting religious garments like the hijab. The Muslim Student Survey was sent out from the National Union of Students in 2017 to try to gather data on the subject of Islamophobia in educational environments. In this survey, nearly 33% of Muslim students reported either abuse or crime in their place of study. Most of these reports are believed to be directly related to Islamophobia.It also shows a disconnect when relating to such students, since only about four in ten reported Muslim students feel their student governments understand their needs.

== In politics ==
Concerns were raised over comments made by Conservative candidate Zac Goldsmith and his campaign team about the then Labour candidate for mayor, Sadiq Khan, during the 2016 London mayoral election, which attempted to link Khan to Islamist extremists. Public opinion polling at the time showed that 31% of Londoners were "uncomfortable" with the prospect of a Muslim mayor. The government issued Casey Review into Integration and Opportunity which aimed to examine the conditions for immigrants to the United Kingdom was criticised for its over focus of the Muslim community, as well as deeper methodical failings. In 2014, over a third of Muslims in the UK said politicians often make bigoted comments towards Muslims.

In October 2017, Conservative MP Bob Blackman was criticised for hosting a parliamentary event attended by far-right Hindu nationalist Tapan Ghosh. The conference was also attended by Home Secretary Amber Rudd and First Secretary of State Damian Green, who distanced themselves from Ghosh's views a week later. Prior to the event, Ghosh had praised the persecution of Muslims in Myanmar, said Muslims were "all jihadis," and that Muslims should be forced to leave their religion if they come to a western country. Blackman responded to criticism by saying that he did not regret sharing a platform with Ghosh, and that Ghosh was not Islamophobic. The Muslim Council of Britain condemned parliament for welcoming "a man who trades in propagating hatred against Muslims in India." On 26 October, Labour MP Naz Shah wrote to Home Secretary Amber Rudd asking why Ghosh was granted a UK visa.

In 2018, the Muslim Council of Britain wrote to the Conservative Party calling for an urgent inquiry, following a number of allegations of Islamophobia. A Conservative councillor, Stephen Ardley had been suspended after he allegedly posted Islamophobic comments about Sadiq Khan, who had by this point been elected as Mayor of London. Ardley had said it was "unbelievable" that a Muslim had been elected, and went on to describe those who voted for him as "blind".

Boris Johnson, British Prime Minister from 2019 until 2022, was involved in several incidences of Islamophobic rhetoric, criticised by many Muslims, including Conservative peer and anti-Islamophobia campaigner Baroness Warsi. In 2005, Johnson wrote in his book The Dream of Rome that Islam caused the Muslim World to be "literally centuries behind the West". In the aftermath of the 2005 London bombings, Johnson questioned the loyalty of British Muslims and wrote that "Islam is the problem." Writing in a column in The Daily Telegraph in August 2018, Johnson stated that Islamic full-face coverings made Muslim women look like "letterboxes". A study by Tell MAMA revealed that in the months following these comments, hate crime against Muslims rose by 375%, with many perpetrators directly referencing Johnson's comments.

== In the media ==
The British media began adopting the term 'Islamophobia' in the late 1980s in order to describe the rise in negative feelings towards the Muslim community. A report from the Runnymede Trust later served to more dramatically move the issue into the public light in 1997. British newspapers, especially those on the political right, frequently position Islam and Muslims as threats to security and as being incompatible with the British way of life.

The media, particularly the Daily Mail and the Daily Express, were criticised in 2017 by the SETA Foundation for Political Economic and Social Research for Islamophobic comments on migrants. A December 2015 survey by City University, London of journalists found an underrepresentation of Muslims in the field. Only 0.4% of British journalists identified as Muslim or Hindu, 31.6% were Christian, and 61.1% had "no religion." Cited in a report covering the ethics of the British Press, Lord Justice Leveson wrote that "the evidence demonstrates that sections of the press betray a tendency, which is far from being universal or even preponderant, to portray Muslims in a negative light."

An academic paper by Katy Sian published in the journal South Asian Popular Culture in 2011 explored the question of how "forced conversion narratives" arose around the Sikh diaspora in the United Kingdom. Sian, who reports that claims of conversion through courtship on campuses are widespread in the UK, says that rather than relying on actual evidence they primarily rest on the word of "a friend of a friend" or on personal anecdote. According to Sian, the narrative is similar to accusations of "white slavery" lodged against the Jewish community and foreigners to the UK and the US, with the former having ties to antisemitism that mirror the Islamophobia betrayed by the modern narrative. Sian expanded on these views in 2013's Mistaken Identities, Forced Conversions, and Postcolonial Formations.

On 16 June 2017, BBC Radio 4 acknowledged a complaint that it failed to properly introduce or challenge Frank Gaffney's "conspiracy theories about Muslims and Islam" when he appeared as a guest on Today.

In an article for The Independent, writer Sufyan Ismail was critical of the media coverage of the 2017 Beckton acid attack, stating that most mainstream media failed to cover the incident or "at best relegated it to a minor story". Ismail suggested that had the roles of the victims and perpetrator been reversed the case would have been headline news. He compared the acid attack to violent hate-murders of Muslims that had received little coverage in contrast with the murder of Jo Cox or the murder of Lee Rigby.

In August 2017, The Sun published a column by Trevor Kavanagh which questioned what actions British society should take to deal with "The Muslim Problem". Kavanagh cited an opinion piece by Labour Shadow Secretary of State for Women and Equalities Sarah Champion MP several days previously as a reason that it was "now acceptable" to describe Muslims as a "specific rather than cultural problem". Sean O'Grady of The Independent said that the column used language reminiscent of Nazi propaganda and Nazi phrases. A joint complaint was made to IPSO by the Board of Deputies of British Jews, Tell MAMA and Faith Matters. A statement by the groups said: "The printing of the phrase 'The Muslim Problem' – particularly with the capitalisation and italics for emphasis – in a national newspaper sets a dangerous precedent, and harks back to the use of the phrase 'The Jewish Problem' in the last century." A cross-party group of over 100 MPs from the Conservatives, Labour, the Liberal Democrats and the Greens subsequently signed a letter to the editor of The Sun demanding action over the column. The letter stated the MPs "were truly outraged by the hate and bigotry" in Kavanagh's column.

== In the justice system ==
A ruling in March 2016 by the European Court of Human Rights effectively cleared of criminal responsibility security officials responsible for the killing of Jean Charles de Menezes in 2005. De Menezes was trailed and then shot dead at London's Stockwell tube station by jumpy security officers who mistook him for a suicide bomber a fortnight after multiple bombings on the capital's transport network in 2005. Critics of the ruling claimed that it upheld the right of the authorities to kill potentially innocent people on the basis of mere supposition and racial/religious prejudice.

As of 2017, arson attacks against mosques and vehicle ramming have statistically risen against Muslims, predominantly in England and Scotland.

In September 2017, police officers warned a Muslim doctor, Naila Imran, against pressing charges following anti-Muslim harassment as a counter claim could lead to her "being arrested."

A 2017 Runnymede Trust and University of Greenwich study found that being black or Muslim doubles a prisoner's chances (40%) of having worse prison experiences, which includes having restraints used against them and being put into segregation in past six months, compared with white or non-Muslim prisoners (21%). They were also more likely to be on the lowest rung of the prison rewards and punishment scheme, more likely to be put into segregation and more likely to have restraint used against them. Almost a third of Muslim prisoners (29%) did not have prison jobs or attend education courses, compared with 17% of Christian prisoners. Runnymede stated that the discrepancy in treatment particularly affects rehabilitation.

In February 2025, written evidence submitted to the Women and Equalities Committee's inquiry into gendered Islamophobia by researcher Mohamad Al-Mail argued that the Marriage and Civil Partnership (Minimum Age) Act 2022 criminalising marriages under 18 forces young Muslim women into secrecy, denying their agency. The submission further contended that policies such as PREVENT exacerbate gendered Islamophobia by labelling traditional practices like modesty and gender segregation as "extremist," thereby reinforcing stereotypes of Muslim women as requiring external "saving."

== Stereotyping ==
In June 2004, prior to the 7/7 attacks on the London Underground, the Commission on British Muslims and Islamophobia, warned that increased attacks against individuals and mosques, was resulting in bitterness that created violent "time-bombs".

== Hate crimes ==
Some Muslims have been victims of violence because of their religion. In 2005, The Guardian commissioned an ICM poll which indicated an increase in anti-Muslim incidents, particularly after the London bombings in July 2005. Another survey of Muslims, this by the Open Society Institute, found that of those polled 32% believed they had suffered religious discrimination at airports, and 80% said they had experienced Islamophobia.

In January 2010, a report by the University of Exeter's European Muslim research centre noted that the number of anti-Muslim hate crimes has increased, ranging from "death threats and murder to persistent low-level assaults, such as spitting and name-calling," for which the media and politicians have been blamed with fueling anti-Muslim hatred. The Islamophobic incidents it described include: "Neil Lewington, a violent extremist nationalist convicted in July 2009 of a bomb plot; Terrance Gavan, a violent extremist nationalist convicted in January 2010 of manufacturing nail bombs and other explosives, firearms and weapons; a gang attack in November 2009 on Muslim students at City University; the murder in September 2009 of Muslim pensioner, Ikram Syed ul-Haq; a serious assault in August 2007 on the Imam at London Central Mosque; and an arson attack in June 2009 on Greenwich Islamic Centre." Other Islamophobic incidents mentioned in the report include "Yasir, a young Moroccan," being "nearly killed while waiting to take a bus from Willesden to Regent's Park in London" and "left in a coma for three months"; "Mohammed Kohelee," a "caretaker who suffered burns to his body while trying to prevent an arson attack against Greenwich Mosque"; "the murder" of "Tooting pensioner Ekram Haque" who "was brutally beaten to death in front of his three year old granddaughter" by a "race-hate" gang; and "police officers" being injured "during an English Defence League (EDL) march in Stoke."

On 26 August 2007, fans of the English football club Newcastle United directed anti-Muslim chants at Egyptian Middlesbrough F.C. striker Mido. An FA investigation was launched. He revealed his anger at The FA's investigation, believing that they would make no difference to any future abuse. Two men were eventually arrested over the chanting and were due to appear at Teesside Magistrates Court.

A 2013 report by Professor Nigel Copsey of Teesside University, concluded that between 40% and 60% of mosques and other Islamic centers in the UK had suffered vandalism or arson.

In the week following the London Bridge attack in June 2017, anti-Muslim hate crimes increased fivefold. It was the largest increase in hate crimes against Muslims in the country since the similar backlash following the 2013 Murder of Lee Rigby. Acid attacks against Muslims such as the 2017 Beckton acid attack have also risen. Days after the London Bridge attack, a man named Darren Osborne intentionally rammed a van into Muslims coming out of a mosque in London, killing one and leaving 10 people injured.

In August 2017, West Yorkshire Police launched a hate crime investigation after letters threatening acid attacks on Muslims were posted in Bradford. The police said the threats were "extremely seriously" increased patrols in Hanover Square, a mainly Muslim inner-city area where at least two residents received the letters last week. The literature shows an image of a sword and the Saint George's Flag with the words: "Kill scum Muslims."

An October 2017 Press Association investigation found that hate crimes targeting mosques and other Muslim places of worship across the UK more than doubled between 2016 and 2017. The same month, during Hate Crime Awareness Week, Associate Professor of Criminology at Birmingham City University Imran Awan and Lecturer in Criminology at Nottingham Trent University Irene Zempi presented research at the House of Commons showing that some non-Muslim men suffered verbal, physical and emotional abuse because they looked Muslim.

In April 2018, letters were sent to people in East London calling for a "Punish a Muslim Day", with a points system to award people for acts of hatred toward Muslims. Police said there was no credible evidence of a planned attack, and in June of the same year a man from Lincoln was arrested and charged with fourteen criminal offences in connection with the hate mail campaign. At his trial at the Old Bailey in October 2018 he pleaded guilty to fifteen charges relating to the "Punish a Muslim Day" letters and other correspondences sent to individuals, public figures and organisations.

A 2023 survey by ITV News and an anti-Muslim monitoring group found that almost 90% of mosques across the UK have experienced acts of hate crime in the last year and that Islamophobic hate crimes had increased by five times in the last decade.

On 4 October 2025, two people were filmed setting fire to a mosque in Peacehaven, East Sussex. Two suspects arrested in connection with the attack were later charged with arson with intent to endanger life.

According to new data, more than 70 attacks on mosques in Britain have been recorded over the past year. According to the British Muslim Trust, the number of attacks is increasing, and they have included intimidation, violence, property damage, harassment, and anti-Muslim hate speech. According to a report published by the government partner responsible for monitoring anti-Muslim hatred, one mosque in Britain is attacked every five days, with London, Greater Manchester, and the West Midlands being the three areas with the highest number of attacks.

=== 2024 riots ===
Following the mass stabbing attack against women and girls in Southport on 29 July 2024, false rumours circulated on social media that the attacker was a Muslim asylum seeker.

The day after the stabbings, a large crowd gathered outside Southport mosque, chanting slogans relating to anti-Islamic campaigner Tommy Robinson. Protestors then attacked the police and disturbances continued for several hours. Following these events, riots, protests and counter-protests occurred around the country for several days.

During the disturbances, mosques and asylum seeker hostels were attacked and damaged, including a failed petrol bombing of a mosque in Newtownards and an attempt to burn down a hotel full of people in Doncaster. Assaults against Muslims and people of colour also occurred.

Shabna Begum, head of the Runnymede Trust, stated that the riots were the consequence of a dehumanising political and media discourse which led to "a normalisation of Islamophobic rhetoric".

There were also reports of Muslim men attacking alleged EDL demonstrators. Two men were jailed for attacking protectors draped in Union Jack flags.

== Organisations ==
=== English Defence League ===
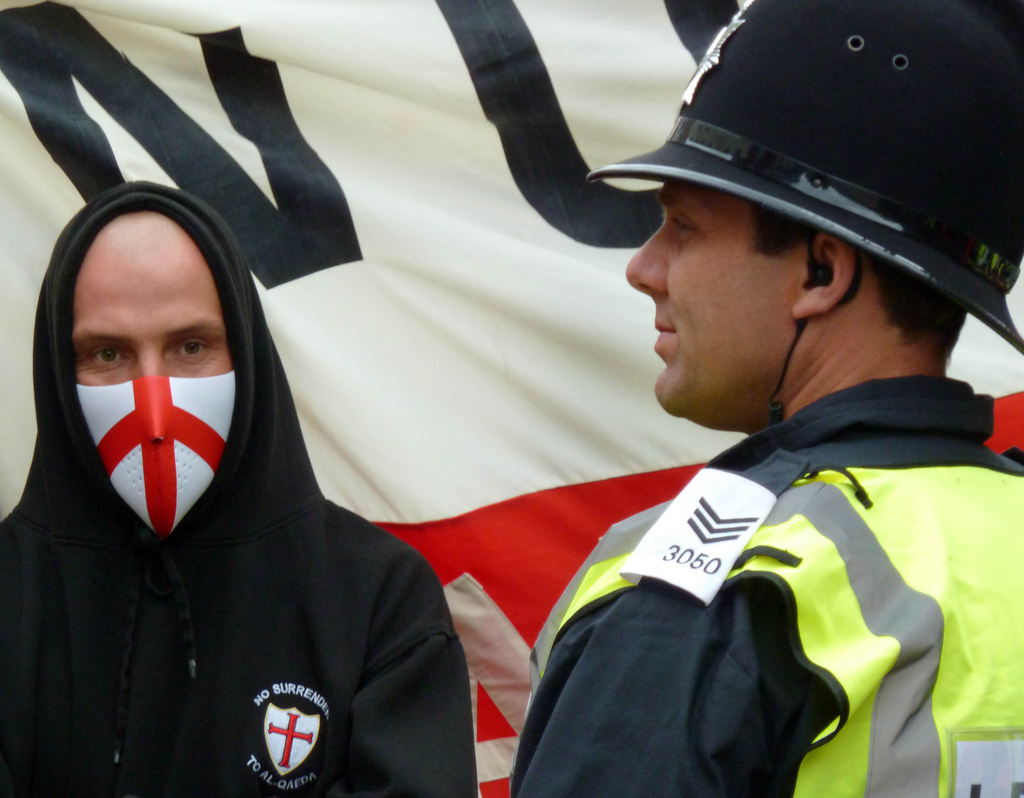
The English Defence League organises demonstrations against Islamism, but it has been criticised for targeting Muslims in general.

The emergence of the English Defence League resulted in demonstrations in English cities with large Muslim populations. The EDL was a far-right, anti-Islam street protest movement which opposed what it considers to be a spread of Islamism, Sharia law and Islamic extremism in the United Kingdom. The EDL has been described as Islamophobic. It has had confrontations with various groups, including supporters of Unite Against Fascism (UAF) and Anonymous.

Co-founder and political activist Tommy Robinson left the group after four years to take on a more peaceful and political approach, and worried about the dangers of right-wing extremism.

Of the online Islamophobic attack reports received in 2012 by the Tell Measuring Anti-Muslim Attacks (MAMA) organization, 69% had a connection to the far right including the English Defense League.

=== Scottish Defence League ===
The SDL are similar to their counterpart and are very closely associated with the EDL. They are seen as Scotland's main anti-Islamic group. The SDL hold regular demonstrations in Scottish cities. The group is mainly active in Edinburgh, Fife and Glasgow.

Two-time murderer Ronnie Coulter was seen in attendance at a July 2016 SDL demonstration in Edinburgh.

In July 2017, an SDL supporter was found guilty of kicking on the body and punching on the head of an anti-fascist protester who was handing out anti-racism leaflets in Edinburgh. It was alleged that he called the other fellow protesters, in particular a black South African woman, a monkey. He received 12 months community service. Also in 2017, former Scottish Labour Party Deputy Leader Anas Sarwar alleged that he faced death threats from the SDL.

=== British National Party ===
The British National Party (BNP) has been widely criticised for its anti-Islamic rhetoric and policies. It has called for the prohibition of immigration from Muslim countries and the building of new mosques in the UK. It also called for the immediate deportation of radical Islamist preachers from the country. In 2005, the party stated that its primary issue of concern was the "growth of fundamentalist-militant Islam in the UK and its ever-increasing threat to Western civilization and our implicit values".

== Opposition ==
Several organisations exist in the United Kingdom to combat Islamophobia. Tell MAMA is an organisation that monitors and records hate crimes against Muslims. Following the passage of Executive Order 13769 by U.S. President Donald Trump, protests took place all across the country by non-Muslim Britons in solidarity with British Muslims and Muslim refugees.

Following a protest by the EDL in April 2017, the Birmingham Central Mosque held a tea party with the goal of countering those demonstrations and promoting interfaith dialogue. The tea party ended up receiving more participants than the original EDL march.

J-Voice, a socialist and progressive Jewish community project, has condemned what it refers to as a "a rise in hatred towards Muslims" and called for Muslims and Jews in the UK to remain united against the "far-right." Following a meeting between Manchester's Jewish community and Tommy Robinson, the Board of Deputies of British Jews stated that "Robinson’s record of anti-Muslim provocation means that he could never be a partner of a respectable or mainstream Jewish organisation."

Based out of London, the Islamic Human Rights Commission (IHRC) is a UK human rights organization that works to campaign for justice for the British Muslim community. Along with working closely with the United Nations, IHRC has produced and submitted numerous articles, reports, and general research on islamophobia to governments and international organisations to offer Another group that works closely with the UK government is the British Muslim Network, co-founded in 2025 by Akeela Ahmed, with the aim of improving British policymaking and tackling Islamophobia.

== History ==
Robert Lambert and Graham Edward Geddes have compared Islamophobia and anti-Muslim street violence to that of Paki-bashing, a form of racist violence that was perpetrated against South Asians since the 1960s. Lambert notes that a key difference is that, while the National Front and the BNP targeted all South Asians (including Muslims, Hindus and Sikhs), the EDL specifically targeted British Muslims. Lambert also compares the media's role in fueling "Paki-bashing" in the late 20th century to its role in fueling anti-Muslim sentiment in the early 21st century. Geddes notes that variations of the "Paki" racial slur are occasionally used by members of the EDL.

British Asians (both Muslim and non-Muslim) faced increased discrimination following Enoch Powell's Rivers of Blood speech and the establishment of the National Front in the late 1960s. This included overt racism in the form of Paki bashing, predominantly from white power skinheads, the National Front, and the British National Party, throughout the 1970s and 1980s. Drawing inspiration from the civil rights movement, the black power movement, and the anti-apartheid movement, young British Pakistani and British Bangladeshi activists began a number of anti-racist Asian youth movements in the 1970s and 1980s, including the Bradford Youth Movement in 1977, the Bangladeshi Youth Movement following the murder of Altab Ali in 1978, and the Newham Youth Movement following the murder of Akhtar Ali Baig in 1980.

== See also ==
- Islam in the United Kingdom
- Islam in England
- Islam in Scotland
- Islam in Wales
- Islam in Northern Ireland
- 7/7 Attacks

== Sources ==
- Goodwin, Matthew J. (2011). New British Fascism: Rise of the British National Party. London and New York: Routledge. ISBN 978-0-415-46500-7.
- Merali, Arzu (2017). "Islamophobia in the United Kingdom National Report 2016" (PDF). European Islamophobia Report. Istanbul, Turkey: Foundation for Political, Economic and Social Research.
