= Myrdal (surname) =

Myrdal is a surname. Notable people with the surname include:

- Alva Myrdal (1902–1986), Swedish diplomat, politician and writer
- Arne Myrdal (1935-2007), Norwegian anti-immigrant activist
- Gunnar Myrdal (1898–1987), Swedish economist and politician
- Jan Myrdal (1927–2020), Swedish author, leftist-political writer and columnist
- Janne Myrdal (born 1962), Norwegian-American politician
- Rosemarie Myrdal (1929–2023), North Dakota Republican Party politician
