= FKL =

FKL may refer to:

- Falkland Islands Holdings, a British conglomerate
- Football Kenya Limited, a defunct Kenyan football league
- Multicultural List (Norwegian: Flerkulturell liste), a Norwegian political party
- Venango Regional Airport, in Pennsylvania, United States
