= Euronat =

Former far-right European political alliance

EuroNat
- Leader: Jean-Marie Le Pen
- Founded: 30 March 1997
- Dissolved: 24 October 2009
- Succeeded by: Alliance of European National Movements
- Ideology: Ultranationalism; National conservatism Right-wing populism Neo-fascism; Anti-communism; Anti-immigration; Hard Euroscepticism
- Political position: Far-right
- European Parliament group: Identity, Tradition, Sovereignty
- Colours: Purple
- Slogan: Europe is ours, let's take it back!
- 5th European Parliament: 8 / 626
- 6th European Parliament: 17 / 785
- 7th European Parliament: 9 / 754

Website
- euronat.org

EuroNat was a far-right and ultranationalist European political alliance, formed at the congress of the French National Front (FN) in Strasbourg on 30 March 1997. It had a loose organisational structure, and was, in practice, based on coordination by activities of the FN.

The organisation failed to attract much support in Western Europe, as FN leader Jean-Marie Le Pen was more successful in gathering support in Eastern Europe. NordNat was an attempt to form a regional organisation by Nordic parties. As of the late 2000s, only the FN, BNP, ND, MS-FT, DN and NR parties were listed as members of EuroNat.

In a joint declaration, the founders of EuroNat expressed, among other things, the view that a "reborn" Europe "should be built with the European nations based on civilizations rooted in Greek, Celtic, Germanic, Latin and Christian traditions." The declaration was signed by representatives of, among others, Forza Nuova, the Greater Romanian Party and Democracia Nacional, as well as the previously mentioned Sweden Democrats and Front National.

Parties that at one point were part of the organisation include:

Country	Party
Belgium	Vlaams Blok
Czech Republic	Rally for the Republic – Republican Party of Czechoslovakia
Czech Republic	Republicans of Miroslav Sladek
Croatia	Croatian Party of Rights
Finland	Patriotic People's Movement
France	National Front
Germany	German People's Union
Greece	Hellenic Front
Hungary	Hungarian Justice and Life Party
Italy	New Force
Italy	Tricolour Flame
Netherlands	New Right
Portugal	National Alliance
Romania	Greater Romania Party
Serbia	Serbian Radical Party
Slovakia	Slovak National Party
Spain	National Democracy
Sweden	National Democrats
Sweden	Sweden Democrats
United Kingdom	British National Party

== See also ==
- Europe of Sovereign Nations Group (2024–present)
- Alliance for Peace and Freedom (2015–present)
- Alliance of European National Movements (2009–2019)
- European Right (1989–1994)
- NordNat

== Bibliography ==
- Mareš, Miroslav (July 2006). Transnational Networks of Extreme Right Parties in East Central Europe: Stimuli and Limits of Cross-Border Cooperation (PDF). Brno, Czech Republic: Masaryk University.
- Euro-Nat - The international network of the Sweden Democrats, Stieg Larsson, David Lagerlöf, Svend Johansen, Kerstin Zachrisson ISBN 91-972204-5-0
- Euro-Nat: Sverigedemokraternas internationella nätverk, Stieg Larsson ISBN 91-972204-7-7
