= Akeela Ahmed =

British activist

Akeela Ahmed MBE
- Born: London, England
- Education: King's College London (MSc)
- Occupation: Activist
- Known for: Founder of She Speaks We Hear
- Website: akeelaahmed.com

Akeela Ahmed MBE is a British activist who supports Muslim women and combats Islamophobia. She is the founder of the online platform She Speaks We Hear, and was appointed a Member of the Order of the British Empire in 2018.

== Early life and education ==
Ahmed was born and raised in London. While working in a law firm as a teenager, Ahmed recalls encountering stereotypes and was criticized for dressing unprofessionally.

Ahmed graduated from the Institute of Psychiatry at King's College London with a Master of Science in Mental Health Studies.

== Career ==
Ahmed joined the Anti-Muslim Hatred Working Group in 2012. She has worked to get anti-Muslim crime recognized as a hate crime within the United Kingdom, earning recognition from Lord Bourne of Aberystwyth who said she "is a great role model doing excellent work". Ahmed has worked to challenge the social prejudice linking Muslim culture to terrorism, especially after notable shooting events such as the Charlie Hebdo shooting.

In 2014, Ahmed founded the online platform She Speaks We Hear, which aims to both boost women of all faith and provide a counter-narrative to negative stereotypes of Muslim women. As a step to further counter Islamophobia, Ahmed added the ability for women to record and anonymously share any experiences of mistreatment or bigotry on She Speaks We Hear. Ahmed also works with the nonprofit Seaside CIC, which offers aid and assistance to homeless people in Brighton.

In 2025, Ahmed co-founded the British Muslim Network, along with Syima Aslam, Julie Siddiqi, and Imam Asim Hafiz. Ahmed has stated that the new organization aims to improve both British policymaking and help Muslim communities progress throughout the country. Ahmed has also stated that the new group will work alongside existing organizations like the Muslim Council of Britain.

== Awards and honors ==
- In 2017, Ahmed was included on Stylist’s Women of the Year list
- In 2017, Ahmed was listed as an ‘Activist Making a Difference’ in Nylon for Muslim Women's Day 2017
- In 2018, Ahmed was appointed Member of the Order of the British Empire (MBE) in recognition of her services to Muslim women
- In 2019, Ahmed received an Ethnicity Award for her contribution to communities

== See also ==
- Islamophobia in the United Kingdom
