= Dag Danielsen =

Norwegian politician (born 1955)

Dag Danielsen (born 8 April 1955) is a Norwegian politician. He was a Storting representative between 1997–2001, representing Fremskrittspartiet. In 2001, he was involved in arguments with the party leadership, and left the party with, among others, Vidar Kleppe.

Danielsen has also been involved with local politics in Oslo.

Danielsen is the general secretary of the Norwegian Chess Federation and his brother is lawyer Per Danielsen.
