= Arne Myrdal =

Norwegian anti-immigration politician (1935–2007)

Arne Johannes Myrdal (2 November 1935 – 8 August 2007) was a Norwegian local politician and later a convicted anti-immigration activist. He also saw himself as a very religious man. He had a varied working career, including as a military officer and businessman. He was active in local politics for the Labour Party in the 1960s, until he broke out and founded the local "Øyestad Free Labour Party" ("Øyestad frie Arbeiderparti"). In 1981, he came in the public spotlight for having co-written a highly controversial local history book for Øyestad Municipality.

Myrdal was one of the founders of the anti-immigration organisation Folkebevegelsen mot innvandring (FMI) in 1987, and went on to become well known for his activism and violent clashes in the late 1980s to early 1990s, initially as the leader of the organisation. In 1990, he was convicted to one year in prison for planning to bomb an asylum centre. He broke out of the FMI in 1991 to form his own more militant organisation, Norge mot innvandring (NMI). Myrdal retired from political activity in the mid-1990s due to failing health. He died in 2007 following long-term illness.

== Early life ==
Myrdal was educated in trade school and Officer Candidate School for the infantry. His working career varied between writing local history books about Øyestad Municipality, working as an unskilled worker on the oil facilities Gullfaks B and C, Mongstad and Rafnes. He also ran a business as a scrap dealer, worked in Televerket, ran a car dealership in Arendal and fared at sea.

In the 1960s, Myrdal was a local politician in Øyestad for the Labour Party. He however withdrew from the party as he could not enlist whoever he wanted to the party, and instead founded the Øyestad Free Labour Party (Øyestad frie Arbeiderparti) for the 1967 local elections. His new party became represented in the municipal council, and Myrdal himself was a local councillor for eight years.

As Myrdal did not get municipal backing for writing a local history book (bygdebok) for Øyestad in the late 1970s, he decided to write and self-publish one anyway. The book was published in 1981 and became a best-seller, but received widespread criticism because Myrdal had filled it with possibly libelous private content.

== Anti-immigration activism ==
"The Muslims have come to conquer Europe. [...] We can either surrender and let them take over our country – rape our country! – or we may prepare ourselves for resistance, and that is what we are doing right now."

— Arne Myrdal, 12 August 1989.

In 1987, Myrdal co-founded and became the leader of Folkebevegelsen mot innvandring (People's Movement Against Immigration, FMI). In April 1990, he led the attacks against incoming demonstrators at the organisation's annual meeting in Fevik. Myrdal was convicted for four months imprisonment for the incident. When he held a meeting in Tønsberg in June of the same year, he and other FMI members were chased away by Blitz movement and SOS Rasisme activists.

Myrdal was squeezed out of the FMI in April 1991 because of his violent activism. As Myrdal wanted "more action and less talk", he went on to form his own group Norge Mot Innvandring (Norway Against Immigration, NMI). He and his supporters went on to hold a meeting in Brumunddal in August the same year, which resulted in street fights where hundreds of Blitz and other left-wing activists were chased away by his supporters and local youth. When he later returned to finish his speech, four thousand people stood and turned their backs on him. When he held a speech in Youngstorget in Oslo later the same year, ten thousand people turned their backs on him.

In June 1992, Myrdal stated in the newspaper Verdens Gang that he had been in contacts with representatives for the Swedish White Aryan Resistance. He said that it did not matter who he cooperated with as long as they were fighting for the same cause. In late 1992, Myrdal announced that he had created a "Traitor Register" (landssvikregister) which included 350 individuals. In November 1992, Myrdal was beaten up outside his home by three activists who said it was a "greeting" from SOS Rasisme.

== Convicted for planned asylum centre bombing ==
At the end of 1988, undercover FMI member Tom Krømcke reached out to Myrdal with the possession of dynamite. He brought this to Myrdal's home, and the next day the police stormed his house. Myrdal was later convicted to one year imprisonment for planning to bomb the Hove asylum centre, which was still unfinished and in the building process.

The contacts with the police had been initiated by Klassekampen journalist Finn Sjue, and Krømcke later confirmed in an interview with the same newspaper that he had joined the FMI with the single purpose of working against the organisation. Myrdal later claimed that it was Krømcke who had brought up the idea of taking action against the asylum centre, that the whole incident thus was a set-up, and that he himself in addition had been under the influence of alcohol the night they met.

== Published books ==
- Gamle gårder i Øyestad (1981)
- Sannheten skal fram (1990)

== Bibliography ==
- Bjørgo, Tore (1997). "The anti-immigration discourse: 'resistance' against 'invaders' and 'national traitors'". In Modood, Tariq; Werbner, Pnina (eds.). The politics of multiculturalism in the new Europe: racism, identity, and community. Palgrave Macmillan. ISBN 978-1-85649-422-9.
