= Multicultural List =

Norwegian political party

Multicultural List (Norwegian: Flerkulturell liste, FKL) was a Norwegian immigrant political party.

== History ==
The first and only time the party has completely independently run for election was in the 1995 municipal election in Oslo where it received 2.600 votes in the city. This accounted for about 10-12% of the immigrant votes. In the 1999 local elections the party cooperated with Red Electoral Alliance and got its leader and candidate Athar Ali elected as member of the Oslo city council.

== Political profile ==
In February 1996 leader Athar Ali reacted strongly when a group of Muslim city councilmen in Oslo took indirect distance to the Fatwā against novelist Salman Rushdie. Shortly after the 1999 election, Athar Ali also said that arranged marriages should be accepted, stating that: "Arranged marriage is all in all a good arrangement, where two families agree to a sort of contract. [...] no-one wants to hurt and disappoint their parents. I believe indigenous Norwegians have difficulties understanding this. For you it seems completely absurd that a marriage should be directed by something else than love between two persons". Otherwise the Multicultural List also wanted the state to acknowledge languages such as Urdu, Turkish, Arabic and Vietnamese as official minority languages, thereby getting a status equal to Sami. Other than cooperating with Red Electoral Alliance, the list has also expressed support for the Socialist Left Party.
