= Norwegian People's Party =

Norwegian People's Party Norsk Folkeparti
- Leader: Oddbjørn Jonstad
- Founded: December 1999
- Ideology: Norwegian nationalism National conservatism
- Political position: Right-wing to far-right
- Colours: Red, Blue

Website
- www.norskfolkeparti.no

The Norwegian People's Party (Norwegian: Norsk Folkeparti, NFP) is a political party in Norway which was founded in 1999. The party is led by Oddbjørn Jonstad, a former local leader of the Progress Party who was expelled from the party following some controversial proposals he made on immigration issues. The party contested the 2001 election in all counties, but in 2003 in only one; a lack of resources led Jonstad himself to head a local Democrats list instead. The NFP gained little support in these elections, and has not contested an election since.

== History ==
The party was founded by Oddbjørn Jonstad, the former chairman of the Oppegård chapter of the Progress Party, who was suspended from the party following his proposal to put refugees and asylum seekers in state-owned camps, and to deny children of refugees from attending Norwegian schools. He was still on top of the Progress Party electoral list for the 1999 local elections, but enough Progress Party voters had written him off the list so that he was not elected. He was expelled from the party after the election, as he had worked to create a new party. The NFP was founded in December 1999, and Jonstad was chosen as the party's first leader at its national convention in Risør in August 2000.

The party contested the 2001 parliamentary election in all counties of Norway, but received a mere 0.1% of the vote. Following a failed merger of the party with the National Alliance, the NFP was registered in its current state on 24 August 2002. The party had also planned to merge with the Fatherland Party, but according to Jonstad, the latter party's leader Harald Trefall had made organisational demands he refused to agree on. While still leader of the party, Jonstad ran for the 2003 local elections as head of the Democrats' list in Oppegård, as the NFP only had resources to contest the election in Rogaland. The party did not contest the 2005 parliamentary election.

In 2008, the party filed suit against the Ny Tid magazine for publishing an alleged racist article by Ali Farah; in 2009, it reported various people to the police who had helped an Iranian who had lost her Norwegian residence permit back to Norway.

== Political profile ==
The foremost issue for the party is opposition to immigration. The party is also sceptical of international organisations, and wants to re-consider Norway's membership of organisations such as the United Nations, NATO and the Schengen agreement. It also wants to limit public authority and bureaucracy "as much as possible," and to introduce binding referendums in "important questions".

=== Parliamentary elections ===
Year	Result #	Result %	Seats
2001	1,609	0.1% #16	0
