= NordNat =

Association of Nordic nationalist parties

NordNat was an association of nationalist parties, founded in Malmö on 8 June 1997, in an attempt to unite Nordic nationalist parties. The main initiator was the Sweden Democrats, which were then also a member of the wider EuroNat together with the Finnish Patriotic People's Movement. The parties regarded themselves as "national democratic", and established a charter which set to work for protection of national sovereignty, the environment, the Nordic culture and people, and to oppose mass immigration. According to a Council of Europe report, the Swedish and Finnish parties were "conventional nationalist parties", while the Norwegian and Danish ones were "neo-nazi groupings". The association was dissolved in 1999. The four parties in the association were:

- Sweden Democrats (SD)
- (Norway) Fatherland Party (FLP)
- (Denmark) National Party (NP)
- (Finland) Patriotic People's Movement (IKL)
