= 2017 Beckton acid attack =

Violent crime in London, England

- 2017 Beckton acid attack (London Borough of Newham) 2017 Beckton acid attack (Greater London) 2017 Beckton acid attack (the United Kingdom)
- Location: 51.5105°N 0.0678°E; Beckton, London Borough of Newham, United Kingdom
- Date: 21 June 2017; 9:13 a.m. (UTC+01:00)
- Attack type: Acid throwing
- Weapon: Acid
- Injuries: 2
- Victims: Resham Khan; Jameel Muhktar
- Motive: Random

On 21 June 2017 two occupants of a car were attacked with acid in Beckton in the London Borough of Newham. The perpetrator was John Tomlin and the victims were later named as Jameel Muhktar and his cousin and aspiring model Resham Khan. Their injuries were described as "life-changing". Police investigated the incident as a hate crime, and the victims believe the incident represented rising islamophobia in the United Kingdom. However, the judge said there was no evidence of a racial motivation. Tomlin was sentenced to 16 years imprisonment on 18 April 2018.

== Background ==
The Beckton attack was part of a series of acid attacks targeting British Asians in London. However, not all acid attacks were similarly classified as hate crimes. As of 2017, the London boroughs of Newham and Tower Hamlets were among the areas of London where acid attacks were most common.

== Attack ==
At 9:13 a.m. BST on Wednesday, 21 June 2017, Jameel Muhktar and Resham Khan were sitting in a stationary car stopped at traffic lights on Tollgate Road, Beckton. A white male approached and threw a corrosive liquid onto them. Both suffered severe burns with their injuries described by the Metropolitan Police as "life-changing".

Khan needed skin grafts to her face and body whilst Muhktar suffered wounds to his stomach, face, neck, ears, arms and back requiring extensive surgery. Muhktar described his clothes and shoes melting following the attack.

== Investigation ==
While investigators originally ruled out a religious or racial motive for the crime, the Metropolitan Police declared that new evidence which had been uncovered on 30 June led them to ultimately investigate the assault as a hate crime. The judge said that there was no evidence that it was a hate crime.

== Suspect ==
The Metropolitan Police later stated it was seeking to speak to John Tomlin, a 24-year-old man known to frequent Canning Town in relation to the incident. His Facebook page contained links to the far-right. Tomlin turned himself in to the Metropolitan Police on 9 July 2017. He was charged with causing grievous bodily harm and appeared at Thames Magistrates' Court on 11 July. He was remanded in custody and ordered to appear at Snaresbrook Crown Court on 8 August. At his hearing on 11 John Tomlin blew kisses at his supporters while in court.

== Reaction ==
The Wharf, a local newspaper, reported that residents were concerned about the increasing number of attacks involving noxious substances in East London. Following an incident in which a man sitting in a car in Commercial Road, Tower Hamlets had a noxious liquid, believed to be bleach, thrown in his face and his car stolen, the Mayor of Tower Hamlets, John Biggs issued a statement seeking to reassure residents.

A crowdfunding campaign set up to help support the pair's aftercare had raised over £46,000 by 1 July 2017.

Stand Up To Racism announced a "vigil in solidarity with Resham and Jameel, and the victims of anti-Muslim hate crime" planned to be held outside Stratford station on 5 July.

=== Government response ===
In an article for The Sunday Times on 16 July, Amber Rudd, the Home Secretary cited the attack on Khan and Mukhtar when she announced an "action plan to tackle acid attacks" which would include "wide-ranging review of the law enforcement and criminal justice response, of existing legislation, of access to harmful products and of the support offered to victims."

=== Criticism of media coverage and police response ===
Jameel Muhktar criticised the initial lack of media coverage and the framing of the incident. Muhktar told Channel 4 News that "If this was an Asian guy like myself, going up to an English couple in a car and acid attacking them, I know for a fact and the whole country knows that it would be classed as a terror attack". He suggested the incident may have been motivated by Islamophobia and as revenge for recent terrorist attacks in the UK.

Resham Khan reported that the Metropolitan Police took "several days" to take any statement from her and that the London Ambulance Service "took too long" to arrive; with the victims being driven to hospital by a bystander.

In an article for The Independent, Sufyan Ismail was critical of the media coverage of the incident, stating most mainstream media failed to cover the incident or "at best relegated it to a minor story". Ismail suggested that had the roles of the victims and perpetrator been reversed the case would have been headline news. He compared the acid attack to violent hate-murders of Muslims that had received little coverage in contrast with the murder of Jo Cox or that of Lee Rigby.
