= 1991 Norwegian local elections =

1991 election for the municipalities and counties of Norway

Country-wide local elections for seats in municipality and county councils were held throughout Norway on 8 and 9 September 1991. For most places this meant that two elections, the municipal elections and the county elections ran concurrently.

== Results ==
=== Municipal elections ===
Results of the 1991 municipal elections. Voter turnout was 65,7%.

Party	Votes	%	Seats
Labour Party	655,716	30.15	4,222
Conservative Party	467,483	21.50	2,198
Socialist Left Party	251,333	11.56	1,275
Centre Party	250,367	11.51	2,248
Christian Democratic Party	169,763	7.81	1,092
Progress Party	141,524	6.51	502
Liberal Party	80,587	3.71	474
Red Electoral Alliance	32,841	1.51	57
Pensioners' Party	30,749	1.41	78
Environment Party The Greens	4,753	0.22	7
Stop the Immigration	2,917	0.13	1
Fatherland Party	1,600	0.07	1
Communist Party	994	0.05	3
Others	83,908	3.86	915
Total	2,174,535	100.00	13,073

=== County elections ===
Results of the 1991 county elections.

Party	Votes	%	Seats
Labour Party	626,601	30.27	304
Conservative Party	454,449	21.95	199
Socialist Left Party	251,447	12.15	120
Centre Party	249,791	12.07	129
Christian Democratic Party	166,794	8.06	86
Progress Party	145,913	7.05	66
Liberal Party	72,446	3.50	36
Pensioners' Party	31,037	1.50	16
Red Electoral Alliance	31,035	1.50	9
Environment Party The Greens	9,257	0.45	0
Sunnmøre List	5,707	0.28	3
Stop the Immigration	4,088	0.20	0
Fatherland Party	3,700	0.18	1
Communist Party	1,339	0.06	0
Sámi People's Party	1,049	0.05	1
National Democrats	655	0.03	0
Altruists	480	0.02	0
Society Party	99	0.00	0
Others	14,029	0.68	7
Total	2,069,916	100.00	977
