= White Electoral Alliance =

White Electoral Alliance Hvit Valgallianse
- Leader: Jack Erik Kjuus
- Founded: 1995
- Dissolved: 1997
- Merger of: Stop Immigration and Help the foreigners home or else we will lose our country
- Ideology: White nationalism
- Political position: Far-right

White Electoral Alliance (Bokmål: Hvit Valgallianse, Nynorsk: Kvit Valallianse) was a short-lived political party in Norway, founded by Jack Erik Kjuus in September 1995 after the merging of Stop Immigration (Stopp Innvandringen) and Help the foreigners home or else we will lose our country (Hjelp de fremmede hjem ellers mister vi landet vårt), both minor fringe parties led by Jack Erik Kjuus. The name of the party was a counter to the contemporary far-left political party Red Electoral Alliance.

== Political profile ==
The party was extremely controversial throughout its short existence, and likely the most extreme far-right party to ever exist in Norway since the second world war. The party wanted to repatriate all immigrants who had come to the country since 1975. For non-western immigrants this would apply from 1960. If this proved infeasible the party advocated forced sterilization. The same applied to immigrants in relationships with ethnic Norwegians as well as their children. According to the party itself, this was to preserve the Norwegian people's ethnic composition.

Because of these sections of the party program, Jack Erik Kjuus was convicted by the Oslo Municipal Court on 21 February 1997; they received a suspended 60-day jail sentence and a 20.000 NOK fine for violation of penal code section § 135a, also known as racism paragraph. The ruling was appealed to the Supreme Court. In the Supreme Court, the issue was discussed in the plenary, which had not happened for 27 years. The ruling from the Municipal Court was upheld in November. Five of the justices argued that the party program protected free speech and voted to acquit, but the remaining twelve voted for upholding the verdict, arguing that promoting ethnic cleansing was beyond free speech protections. Kjuus also brought the case to the European Court of Human Rights, but that court ruled on 17 March 2000 that the verdict was compatible with the European Commission on Human Rights.

As a protest against the verdict, the party board withdrew shortly after. Jack Erik Kjuus also pulled out of politics. Many of its members went over to the newly established party the National Alliance.

== Election results ==
=== Parliamentary elections ===
Year	Result #	Result %
1997	463	0.02% #17
