= Fridtjof Frank Gundersen =

Norwegian politician

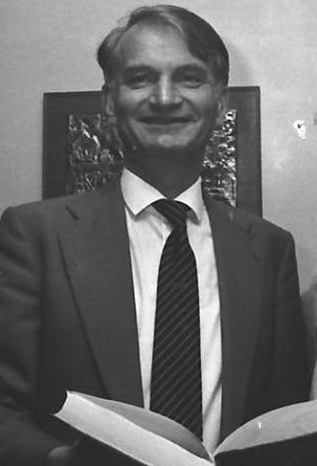

Member of Parliament for Akershus
- In office 1981–1985
- In office 1989–2001

Personal details
- Born: 29 October 1934 Tynset, Norway
- Died: 11 November 2011 (aged 77) Sandvika, Norway
- Party: Independent (1981–90; 2001); Progress Party (1990–2001); Oslo List (2001)
- Spouse(s): Mosse Piene, 1965–91 (her death)
- Profession: Professor, Politician

Fridtjof Frank Gundersen (29 October 1934 – 11 November 2011) was a Norwegian professor of jurisprudence and politician. He worked as a lector at the Faculty of Law of the University of Oslo from 1965 to 1975. In 1975 he became professor of jurisprudence at the Norwegian School of Economics.

Gundersen was elected a Member of Parliament in 1981 representing the Progress Party platform, but did not formally join the party until 1990. He fell out of parliament in 1985, but was re-elected for three consecutive four-year terms from 1989. He left the party in 2001, and failed to get re-elected to parliament again in the election later the same year, having stood for a local electoral list. Following the defeat, he retired as politician.

== Early life and education ==
Gundersen was born in Tynset Municipality in Hedmark to lawyer Ragnar Gundersen (1895–1985) and Betzy Lommeland (1902–1994). After finishing his secondary education in 1954, he came through the Russian language course of the Norwegian army, and achieved the law degree cand.jur. at the University of Oslo in 1961. In 1963 he was the vice chairman of the Norwegian Students' Society. He took the admission course in the Ministry of Foreign Affairs in 1963, and was a secretary in the Ministry until 1965.

== Professional career ==
From 1965 he worked as a lector at the Faculty of Law of the University of Oslo, first in private law, then in public law. In 1973 he achieved the doctoral degree dr. juris. In 1975 he became professor of jurisprudence at the Norwegian School of Economics. He was an awarded lecturer, and has written a large number of publications, regarding law, economics, parliamentary issues such as control of trade monopolies, administrative law, trade law, governance mechanisms, contract law and related things. Many of his books were issued through his own publishing house, operating out of Jar and Sandvika.

In 2006 he admitted to having been a secret intelligence agent for Norway, having reported to the Norwegian Intelligence Service from communist congresses he attended in the Soviet Union during the 1950s and 1960s. This was revealed after pressure from Dag Seierstad who had accused him of this for a long time. In addition to Norwegian, Gundersen had a fluent command of Russian, English, German, French and also spoke some Spanish.

He was a member of the Broadcasting Council from 1986 to 1990, having been a deputy member since 1982. From 1983 to 1985 he was also a member of the commission that prepared the launch of TV 2.

== Political career ==
Gundersen was an active member of the Conservative Party from the mid-1960s. He was chairman of the party's Tenkegruppe 99 from 1966 to 1971 and a member of the party's political council until 1975. In the mid-1970s Gundersen left both the Conservative Party and the Church of Norway, as he according to himself "wanted to stand completely free." He was elected to the Parliament of Norway in 1981 representing the Progress Party, although he did not formally join the party until 1990, and was technically an independent before that. He represented the county of Akershus. He lost his seat in 1985, and the same year he wrote the memoir-like Fri og frank på Tinget.

He decided to enter local politics, and from 1987 to 1989 he was a member of the municipal council of Bærum Municipality. He was re-elected to Parliament in 1989, 1993 and 1997. He thus served three consecutive terms, until 2001. During these twelve terms, he stayed a member of the Parliament's Standing Committee on Foreign Affairs and the Enlarged Committee on Foreign Affairs and Defence.

In February 2001, Gundersen left the party due to not being renominated for a safe seat in Akershus. Other reasons were the recent exclusions and interventions in local nominations by party chairman Carl I. Hagen. Gundersen tried together with other breakaways of the party to run with the Liberal People's Party, but as this failed he rather ran for the new local Oslo List. The election for the party became a failure, and he thus pulled out from active politics.

== Political views ==
Gundersen regarded himself as a libertarian, and was noticed in the Norwegian public debate for numerous unexpected inputs. During the 1960s and 1970s he was a political commentator in the magazine Dag og Tid. During this time, he among other things argued in favor of the Vietnam War, apartheid, the Cold War and the European Economic Community. Later, during his time as a politician for the Progress Party, he argued in favor of boycott of such countries as Iran, China and Cuba, and against immigration. He was regarded as one of the more intellectual and ideological figures in the party.

He claimed that Norwegians are a homogenous people, poorly able to absorb large ethnic minorities who are mostly loyal to their own culture, and that potential problems regarding this will only become more evident in the future. In 1997, he called for a stop of foreign cultural immigration to avoid conflicts, and stated that he thought immigrants of the time could be the terrorists of the future. In 1997 he also drew parallels to the Bosnian War as a possible future scenario in Norway, that "there is a great risk that we will become flooded by Muslims", and that he would not be surprised if Norway would see "serious terrorism" within ten to twenty years. In early 2001 he nonetheless praised Muslims in cities like Cairo and Istanbul for taking more personal care of their friends and family, instead of merely being dependent on public welfare programs which is common in countries like Norway.

== Personal life ==
Gundersen was married in 1965 to Mosse Piene (1 April 1935 – 1991). After her death, he lived in cohabitation with Marit Munro (born 13 November 1939). Gundersen spent much of his free time in Vence, France.

Fridtjof Frank Gundersen died in November 2011 after long-term illness.

== Writings ==
Gundersen has written several publications.

- 1966: Ny solidaritet (et al.), Aschehoug
- 1968: Introduksjon til EEC. Rettslige og politiske spørsmål, Universitetsforlaget
- 1968: FN-ideal og realitet (with Per Morten Vigtel), Gyldendal
- 1969: Fremtiden utfordrer politikerne (editor), Minerva forlag
- 1970: Konservativ kommentar til A-partiets prinsipp-program (editor), Høyres "Tenkegruppe 99"
- 1970: Etableringsretten og Det europeiske økonomiske samarbeid, Grøndahl & Søn Forlag
- 1970: Multinasjonale konserner og kontrollen med dem, European Movement Norway
- 1971: EEC-håndboken. 2 bind, Universitetsforlaget
- 1972: Kontrollen med karteller og storbedrifter, Universitetsforlaget
- 1973: Roma-traktaten og planene om et norsk engrosmonopol for øl, Universitetsforlaget
- 1973: Statlige handelsmonopoler og EF, Universitetsforlaget
- 1977: Hovedlinjer i avtaleretten, Jar
- 1977: Norsk og internasjonal markedsrett (with Ulf Bernitz), Jar
- 1978: Hovedlinjer i forvaltningsretten, Jar ISBN 978-82-990763-3-3
- 1979: Bedrifts- og personalrett (with Christian Schjoldager), Bergen ISBN 978-82-90961-02-7
- 1981: Om å bruke andres penger. En innføring i norsk parasittøkonomi, Oslo ISBN 978-82-990763-0-2
- 1982: Privatrett for økonomer (with Arthur J. Brudvik), Jar ISBN 978-82-990763-1-9
- 1985: Fri og frank på Tinget: liberalisme med norsk vri
- 1986: Praktisk jus - spørsmål og svar, Sandvika ISBN 978-82-90961-07-2
- 1988: Jus for økonomer (with Arthur J. Brudvik), Jar ISBN 978-82-90961-05-8
- 1989: Helse og politiske styringsmekanismer, Tano ISBN 978-82-518-2640-2
- 1989: EF-boken, Tano ISBN 978-82-518-2707-2
- 1989: Lov og rett for næringslivet (with Sverre F. Langfeldt), Tano ISBN 978-82-518-2570-2
- 1992: Innføring i EØS og EF-rett (with Ulf Bernitz), ISBN 978-82-90961-04-1
- 2002: Introduksjon til EU, ISBN 978-82-90961-19-5
- 2010: EU - etter Lisboa-traktaten: institusjoner, rettssystem og rettsregler, Gyldendal ISBN 978-82-05-40145-7
