= 1995 Norwegian local elections =

1995 election for the municipalities and counties of Norway

Country-wide local elections for seats in municipality and county councils were held throughout Norway on 10 and 11 September 1995. For most places this meant that two elections, the municipal elections and the county elections ran concurrently.

== Results ==
=== Municipal elections ===
Results of the 1995 municipal elections.

Party	Votes	%	Seats
Labour Party	644,573	30.53	4,092
Conservative Party	427,242	20.24	1,964
Centre Party	244,326	11.57	2,450
Progress Party	221,493	10.49	695
Christian Democratic Party	173,296	8.21	1,096
Socialist Left Party	126,127	5.97	632
Liberal Party	103,928	4.92	621
Red Electoral Alliance	32,441	1.54	63
Pensioners' Party	19,939	0.94	50
Environment Party The Greens	5,733	0.27	8
Multicultural List	2,600	0.12	0
Fatherland Party	1,360	0.06	0
Natural Law Party	1,234	0.06	0
Communist Party	1,000	0.05	3
Stop the Immigration	628	0.03	1
People's Will	518	0.02	0
Society Party	228	0.01	0
New Future Coalition Party	157	0.01	0
Joint, local and other lists	104,198	4.94	988
Total	2,111,021	100.00	12,663

=== County elections ===
Results of the 1995 county elections.

Party	Votes	%	Seats	+/–
Labour Party	627,546	31.27	308	+4
Conservative Party	399,804	19.92	179	–20
Progress Party	241,814	12.05	103	+37
Centre Party	235,264	11.72	133	+4
Christian Democratic Party	170,605	8.50	86	0
Socialist Left Party	123,164	6.14	58	–62
Liberal Party	94,571	4.71	48	+12
Red Electoral Alliance	34,054	1.70	10	+1
Pensioners' Party	30,137	1.50	14	–2
Environment Party The Greens	8,848	0.44	0	0
Democratic Coalition Party	3,703	0.18	1	–
Fatherland Party	3,644	0.18	0	–1
Communist Party	2,072	0.10	0	0
Free Democrats	1,932	0.10	0	–
Solidarity	1,573	0.08	1	–
Natural Law Party	1,560	0.08	0	–
Stop the Immigration	1,252	0.06	0	0
Sámi People's Party	982	0.05	1	0
Freedom Party	740	0.04	0	–
People's Will	492	0.02	0	–
Society Party	228	0.01	0	0
Other lists	22,814	1.14	11	–
Total	2,006,799	100.00	953	–24
