= 1999 Norwegian local elections =

1999 election for the municipalities and counties of Norway

Country-wide local elections for seats in municipality and county councils were held throughout Norway on 12 and 13 September 1999. For most places this meant that two elections, the municipal elections and the county elections ran concurrently.

== Results ==
=== Municipal elections ===
Results of the 1999 municipal elections. Voter turnout was 60,4%.

Party	Votes	%	Seats
Labour Party	592,281	28.65	3,804
Conservative Party	442,284	21.39	2,086
Progress Party	249,753	12.08	989
Christian Democratic Party	193,265	9.35	1,200
Centre Party	171,080	8.28	1,798
Socialist Left Party	162,054	7.84	685
Liberal Party	90,009	4.35	522
Red Electoral Alliance	40,788	1.97	68
Pensioners' Party	18,419	0.89	33
Environment Party The Greens	5,201	0.25	7
Coastal Party	2,005	0.10	25
Communist Party	1,010	0.05	3
Natural Law Party	702	0.03	0
New Future Coalition Party	622	0.03	1
White Electoral Alliance	260	0.01	0
Generation Party	249	0.01	0
Fatherland Party	227	0.01	0
Non-Partisan Coastal and Rural District Party	163	0.01	0
Society Party	137	0.01	0
Common, local and other lists	96,908	4.69	1,032
Total	2,067,417	100.00	12,253

=== County elections ===
Results of the 1999 county elections. Voter turnout was 56,8%.

Party	Votes	%	Seats	+/–
Labour Party	547,259	28.19	278	–30
Conservative Party	412,758	21.26	185	+6
Progress Party	261,049	13.45	120	+17
Christian Democratic Party	195,459	10.07	102	+16
Centre Party	164,627	8.48	95	–38
Socialist Left Party	165,511	8.53	79	+21
Liberal Party	81,094	4.18	41	–7
Red Electoral Alliance	41,469	2.14	13	+3
Pensioners' Party	24,003	1.24	7	–7
Environment Party The Greens	7,612	0.39	1	+1
Coastal Party	4,530	0.23	3	New
Communist Party	2,263	0.12	0	0
Natural Law Party	1,622	0.08	0	0
New Future Coalition Party	1,409	0.07	0	–
Fatherland Party	1,296	0.07	0	0
Generation Party	860	0.04	0	0
Non-Partisan Coastal and Rural District Party	405	0.02	0	–
White Electoral Alliance	260	0.01	0	0
Society Party	137	0.01	0	0
Other lists	27,613	1.42	15	+1
Total	1,941,236	100.00	939	–14
