= List of English Defence League demonstrations =

The following is a list of English Defence League (EDL) demonstrations:

== Demonstrations ==
Date	Location	Attendance	Description of event
8 August 2009	Birmingham	900	Counter protest by, and clashes with, Unite Against Fascism (UAF) supporters.
5 September 2009	Birmingham	Unknown	Clashes with socialist protestors, West Midlands police state the EDL "...had no intent to protest". 45 arrested were from the EDL; a similar number were arrested belonged to groups opposing them.
13 September 2009	London	Unknown	Counter-demonstration to pro-Palestinian rally.
10 October 2009	Manchester	700	Counter-protest by 1,400 UAF supporters. Riot police on hand to separate sides.
31 October 2009	Leeds	900	Counter-protested by 1,500 UAF. Leeds council and West Yorkshire Police thanked the public and participants "for their patience and consideration". The protest was controversial as a tree which had been erected in City Square with the intention to decorate it as a Christmas tree at a later date had to be taken down to accommodate the protest.
November 2009	Glasgow	approx 70	5 arrests
5 December 2009	Nottingham	500	Demonstration following Mercian Regiment homecoming parade, clashes with Muslim students and UAF.
13 December 2009	Harrow, London	Unknown	Protest outside Harrow Central Mosque was countered by 200 UAF members.
23 January 2010	Stoke-on-Trent	1500	EDL break through police lines. Police officers were injured and police vehicles damaged. All arrests were linked to the EDL demonstration. Approximately 300 supporters of Unite Against Fascism held a counter-demonstration.
11 January 2010	Wootton Bassett	200	
5 March 2010	London	300	Rally in support of Geert Wilders' visit to the House of Lords. 100 UAF counter-demonstrators.
20 March 2010	Bolton	2000	Counter-protested by 1500 UAF. 9 arrested from EDL and around 55 from UAF.
3 April 2010	Dudley	2000	Several EDL supporters knocked down fencing and escaped the police cordon. There were 1,500 UAF counter-demonstrators.
1 May 2010	Aylesbury	800	Protest against "militant Islam". Eight of the arrests were on suspicion of carrying an offensive weapon. About 75 UAF counter-demonstrators gathered in the town, but later left.
29 May 2010	Newcastle-upon-Tyne	1500-2000	UAF hold counter-demonstration of around 1,000. No arrests at either demonstration despite minor scuffles.
15 June 2010	Barking	200-300	Counter-demonstration to Muslims Against Crusades (MAC), during 1st Battalion of The Royal Anglian Regiment homecoming parade.
24 June 2010	Kilmarnock	40	No arrests
17 July 2010	Dudley	500	The UAF attendance of 350.
28 August 2010	Bradford	700	1,300 police officers were involved in policing the protest. Various missiles were thrown by EDL supporters during the protest. In an online posting, Anders Behring Breivik claimed he attended the Bradford demonstration.
11 September 2010	Oldham	150	EDL converged on Oldham around mid-day after telephoning police in advance at 8.45am and laid a wreath at the war memorial.
9 October 2010	Leicester	1000	After the Home secretary accepted Leicester City Council's application for a ban on all marches in the city on this date the EDL held a static demonstration numbering 1,000, while Unite Against Fascism (UAF) staged a counter-protest numbering 700. One police officer was taken to hospital with a leg injury and two protesters were treated by paramedics for minor injuries.
25 October 2010	London	Unknown	The EDL held a protest opposing "Islamification" of the United Kingdom and showing support for Israel outside the Israeli embassy. It was attended by Rabbi Nachum Shifren.
30 October 2010	Amsterdam, Netherlands	60	5 Britons were among several dozen arrested.
21 November 2010	Wolverhampton	100	There was a counter-demonstration attended by 40 supporters of UAF.
27 November 2010	Preston	1000-2000	There was a counter-demonstration attended by 150 supporters of UAF.
27 November 2010	Nuneaton	500	There was a counter-demonstration by 150 local anti-fascists. Both sides threw missiles and fire works.
11 December 2010	Peterborough	500	The protest was policed by roughly 1000 officers from 18 forces. A counter-protest by the Peterborough Trades Union Council took place in another location in the city and was attended by approximately 80 people. Police kept the two protests apart.
5 February 2011	Luton	3,000	The EDL was joined by new "defence leagues" from Norway, Sweden and the Netherlands, as well as other more established groups from France, Germany and Denmark. A counter-protest took place in another location in the city and was attended by approximately 1000 UAF supporters. The protests were policed by officers from 14 forces.
5 March 2011	Rochdale	500	Around 500 EDL protesters congregated at Rochdale town centre's war memorial. A counter-protest was held by around 150 people from Unite Against Fascism, with the two groups being kept 100 feet apart by police. 31 people were arrested.
12 March 2011	Dagenham	130	
2 April 2011	Blackburn	2000	
6 May 2011	Grosvenor Square, London	unknown	EDL members clashed with 300 Islamists and MAC members who held a funeral prayer for Osama bin Laden
28 May 2011	Blackpool	1,500-2,000	50 people attended the UAF counter protest.
11 June 2011	Maidenhead	100	No arrests
12 June 2011	Dewsbury	500	75 UAF counter-demonstrators
9 July 2011	Cambridge	300	1,000 attended a counter-demonstration. There were seven arrests in total.
9 July 2011	Halifax	450	6 people were arrested. Cost of policing event £336,000.
9 July 2011	Middlesbrough	500	No people were arrested
9 July 2011	Plymouth	150	300 to 400 UAF counter-demonstrators
16 July 2011	Portsmouth	500	The EDL marched through the city while 200 people attended a counter-demonstration by the UAF in Guildhall Square. 7 arrests.
4 August 2011	Irvine	Unknown	60 UNISON and left-wingers countered the demonstration
9 August 2011	Enfield and Eltham, London	Unknown	EDL supporters were alleged to be among groups of vigilantes who marched through Enfield and Eltham during the 2011 England riots. Reports suggest around 50 EDL supporters among the 200 vigilantes in Eltham and similar numbers among the 500 in Enfield.
13 August 2011	Telford	350	250 counter-demonstrators turned up in the Wellington region
3 September 2011	Tower Hamlets	1,000	1,500 counter-demonstrators turned up
10 September 2011	Bedford	100	100 EDL members demonstrated outside Bedford Prison to protest against the imprisonment of EDL leader Tommy Robinson.
10 September 2011	Edinburgh	200	Scottish Defence League, an offshoot of the EDL, brought 200 supporters who were outnumbered by 400 UAF counterdemonstrators
11 September 2011	London	Unknown	EDL counter protest against a Muslims Against Crusades demonstration in support of the 9/11 attacks outside the US Embassy in London. 40 people were arrested and later two EDL members were stabbed by Muslim youths in Edgware Road.
8 October 2011	Downing Street	150–200	A demonstration was held by the EDL following remarks made by Prime Minister David Cameron's that "I’ve described some parts of our society as sick and there is none sicker than the EDL". A counter-demonstration was organised by the UAF. No arrests were made.
17 October 2011	Sandwell	25	EDL members attacked an Ahmadiyya book stall
17 October 2011	Birmingham	500	There was a counter demonstration by 120 anti-fascists. There were 4 arrests.
11 November 2011	Whitehall	179	179 arrests at Armistice Remembrance Day amid suspicions EDL would disrupt Occupy London
14 January 2012	Barking and Whitechapel	unknown	15 arrests, one man hospitalised
4 February 2012	Leicester	800	2200 police officers were on duty
23 February 2012	Rochdale	200	One officers wounded, two arrested
25 February 2012	Hyde	600	Protest against racist attack on English youth.
31 March 2012	Aarhus, Denmark	Possible 700	Rally to unite other anti-Islam groups throughout Europe
5 May 2012	Luton	2000	
4 June 2012	Newcastle upon Tyne	Unknown	Counter protest against 'anti-Jubilee protesters'.
14 July 2012	Bristol	300	3,000 at the 'Unite Bristol Against the EDL' Counter-Protest
22 July 2012	Chelmsford	30	
6 October 2012	Sunderland	200	Demonstration against planned Sunderland mosque.
29 September 2012	Walsall	500	500 counter protesters, 28 arrests.
11 November 2012	Norwich	200	Protest at Norwich City Council's decision to ban Pastor Alan Clifford, of Norwich Reformed Church, for promoting anti-Islam leaflets.
23 February 2013	Cambridge	30	Demonstration against planned Cambridge mosque.
2 March 2013	Manchester	700	350 UAF took part in a counter demonstration. 12 EDL members and 3 UAF members arrested.
25 May 2013	Newcastle-upon-Tyne	1,500-2,000	Approx 700 counter demonstrators attended the Newcastle Unites event.
20 July 2013	Birmingham	750–1,000	~750—1,000 members showed up
8 September 2013	Tower Hamlets	500	Tommy Robinson arrested
20 February 2016	Preston	150 - 200	No arrests - between 150 and 200 protesters took part
1 April 2017	London	Unknown	Counterprotest by anti-fascists, no arrests.
