= Jack Erik Kjuus =

Jack Erik Kjuus (18 January 1927 – 12 January 2009) was a Norwegian far-right politician of the former White Electoral Alliance who was convicted of racism in 1997. The party Kjuus led was a merger between two anti-immigrant parties, Stop the Immigration and Hjelp de fremmede hjem ellers mister vi landet vårt ("Help the Foreigners Back Home or We Will Lose Our Country").

== Stop Immigration ==
Kjuus was born on 18 January 1927 in Oslo and founded the political party Stop the Immigration in 1987. The party was formally registered on 27 April 1988, after having successfully collected the required 3,000 signatures. The first election it contested was the 1989 parliamentary election, where the party received 0.3% of the votes, and thus no parliamentary representation.

== Racism case ==
In 1995 the anti-immigrant White Electoral Alliance distributed fliers with a party program which among other things called for the forced sterilization of adoptive children from foreign cultures, and sterilization or deportation of the foreign element in a mixed relationship, as well as any children resulting from such relationships.

In February 1997, the city court in Oslo convicted Kjuus of violating the criminal law §135a which outlaws hateful remarks due to things like skin color. Kjuus was given a 60-day suspended jail sentence and fined 20000 Norwegian kroner.

=== Supreme Court ===
Kjuus appealed the case directly to the Supreme Court of Norway who heard the appeal in November 1997. The chief justice Carsten Smith decided that the appeal would be heard with the entire Supreme Court since the case touched upon important questions of principle. Of the nineteen justices on the court, seventeen handled the case. Georg Fredrik Rieber-Mohn was recused from the case since he was formerly the prosecuting attorney who had charged Kjuus while Lars Oftedal Broch was absent due to illness.

The argument from the defense was that the verdict violated Kjuus' right to free speech (constitutionally protected by §100 in the Norwegian Constitution). Kjuus's attorney John I. Henriksen also argued that the party program did not target any specific ethnic group, and that since Kjuus's party was without any political power, any threats arising from the party program were completely abstract.

The appeal was rejected after only five of the seventeen justices voted for acquittal, while twelve voted to uphold the sentence. In fact, the Supreme Court went further, and convicted Kjuus based on all the points the prosecutor had argued were in violation of §135a. In the city court, Kjuus was only convicted for the part about adoptive children, in the Supreme Court he was also convicted due to the points on foreigners in general.

In the majority opinion authored by Karenanne Gussgard, the court opined that the party program called for ethnic cleansing, and that it involved "extreme infringements of integrity". The dissenting opinion for acquittal was authored by Ketil Lund and supported by four other justices including chief justice Carsten Smith. The dissent agreed that the program was reprehensible, but argued that the free speech protections afforded by the constitutions §100 should have been given greater weight.

Reactions to the verdict were mixed, the majority of the Norwegian press, opposed the conviction, and editorials in Aftenposten, Dagbladet and Verdens Gang all argued that reprehensible opinions ought to be met with arguments in open fora instead of with the criminal justice system. Nils Øy of the Association of Norwegian Editors called the verdict a blow against free speech. Among the supporters of the verdict was Per Edgar Kokkvold of the Norwegian Press Association who argued that the party program went beyond racist speech and was a plan for ethnic cleansing, and that a line had to be drawn between free speech on the one hand and threats and harassment of minorities on the other. The society for the adopted expressed relief that the basis for the verdict had been expanded.

=== European Court of Human Rights ===
Kjuus brought his case to the European Court of Human Rights arguing that his freedom of expression, as guaranteed by Article 10 of the European Convention on Human Rights, had been violated. The court rejected his claim and cited Article 17 of the convention which forbids using the convention rights in order to seek abolishing or restricting the same rights of others. Hence the court concluded, Article 10 did not protect the advocacy of human rights violations such as racially based forced sterilization programs.
