= 2003 Norwegian local elections =

2003 election for the municipalities and counties of Norway

Country-wide local elections for seats in municipality and county councils were held throughout Norway on 15 September 2003. For most places this meant that two elections, the municipal elections and the county elections ran concurrently. In addition, several municipalities held direct mayoral elections.

Term of office for the elected politicians was 1 January 2004 until 31 December 2007.

== Results ==
=== Municipal elections ===
Results of the 2003 municipal elections. Voter turnout was 58,8%.

| Party | Votes | % |
|---|---|---|
| Labour Party | 566,182 | 27.49 |
| Conservative Party | 373,916 | 18.15 |
| Progress Party | 338,193 | 16.42 |
| Socialist Left Party | 254,900 | 12.37 |
| Centre Party | 163,328 | 7.93 |
| Christian Democratic Party | 132,238 | 6.42 |
| Liberal Party | 79,451 | 3.86 |
| Red Electoral Alliance | 32,194 | 1.56 |
| Pensioners' Party | 26,857 | 1.30 |
| Coastal Party | 4,768 | 0.23 |
| Environment Party The Greens | 3,529 | 0.17 |
| Communist Party | 1,129 | 0.05 |
| Sámi People's Party | 642 | 0.03 |
| Christian Unity Party | 484 | 0.02 |
| Liberal People's Party | 113 | 0.01 |
| Others | 82,005 | 3.98 |
| Total | 2,059,929 | 100.00 |

=== County elections ===
Results of the 2003 county elections. Voter turnout was 55,1%.

| Party | Votes | % | Seats | +/– |
|---|---|---|---|---|
| Labour Party | 520,558 | 27.00 | 223 | –55 |
| Progress Party | 346,020 | 17.94 | 137 | +17 |
| Conservative Party | 344,171 | 17.85 | 128 | –57 |
| Socialist Left Party | 251,551 | 13.05 | 102 | +23 |
| Centre Party | 155,137 | 8.05 | 80 | –15 |
| Christian Democratic Party | 132,540 | 6.87 | 59 | –43 |
| Liberal Party | 71,026 | 3.68 | 30 | –11 |
| Pensioners' Party | 32,282 | 1.67 | 8 | +1 |
| Red Electoral Alliance | 29,651 | 1.54 | 8 | –5 |
| Coastal Party | 11,038 | 0.57 | 4 | +2 |
| Sunnmøre List | 5,774 | 0.30 | 3 | – |
| Democrats | 5,153 | 0.27 | 1 | – |
| Environment Party The Greens | 4,747 | 0.25 | 0 | –1 |
| Christian Unity Party | 2,413 | 0.13 | 0 | – |
| Communist Party | 1,430 | 0.07 | 0 | 0 |
| Sámi People's Party | 1,300 | 0.07 | 2 | +1 |
| Norwegian People's Party | 171 | 0.01 | 0 | – |
| Liberal People's Party | 113 | 0.01 | 0 | 0 |
| Vestfold List | 13,225 | 0.69 | 2 | – |
| Others | 13,225 | 0.69 | 0 | – |
| Total | 1,928,300 | 100.00 | 787 | –152 |
