= Vidar Kleppe =

Norwegian politician

Leader of the Democrats
- In office 24 August 2002 – 22 April 2012
- Preceded by: Position established
- Succeeded by: Kjell Arne Sellæg

Member of the Norwegian Parliament
- In office 1 October 1997 – 30 September 2001
- Constituency: Vest-Agder
- In office 1 October 1989 – 30 September 1993
- Constituency: Vest-Agder

Personal details
- Born: 16 September 1963 (age 62) Bergen, Norway
- Party: Kleppe List (since 2023)
- Other political affiliations: Progress Party (1989–2001); Southern Norway List (2001); Democrats (2002–23)
- Children: 3

Vidar Sveinung Kleppe (born 16 September 1963) is a Norwegian politician. He was a member of parliament and deputy leader of the Progress Party until he was suspended and left the party in 2001. He was the founder and leader of the Democrats party from 2002 to 2012, and has since 2003 held public office as a member of the Vest-Agder county council and the municipal council for Kristiansand Municipality.

== Early and personal life ==
Kleppe was born in Bergen to CEO Erling Kleppe (1941–1989) and his wife Harriet Uthaug (1944–2018), and was raised in Fedje Municipality. He received education at a mechanical school from 1980 to 1981, and after this went to sea for a year. When he came back he worked as an industrial labourer in Kristiansand for four years, until 1987 when he was a businessman for two years. He was married in 1992 to Elin Dyrstad Kleppe, and has three children, two with Elin. For his wedding, Jan Simonsen was his best man. Kleppe wrote in 2021 that his wife Elin had died of cancer.

== Political career ==
=== Progress Party (1989–2001) ===
Kleppe was a prominent politician for the Progress Party during the 1990s and was a member of their national board from 1989 to 1999. He was a member of parliament for two periods, from 1989 to 1993 and from 1997 to 2001. From 1995 to 1999 he was the second deputy leader of the party. He also held the office as a member of the Kristiansand municipal council from 1987 to 1999. During electoral campaigns in 1999, Kleppe, together with his close party colleague Øystein Hedstrøm, notably ran numerous campaigns together, popularly known as the "Hedstrøm & Kleppe Show", where they discussed issues regarding immigration and integration.

In early 2001 turmoil however erupted within the Progress Party, and Kleppe was suspended and soon left the party, in spite of strong opposition to the suspension in many local chapters of the party. Kleppe was seen by party chairman Carl I. Hagen as a "leader" of a rebellious faction of the party, as well as being controversial, because of his positions on immigration as well as other issues where he contradicted the official party policy. He was also accused of not being a "constructive team player." His earlier history was toppled when Kleppe attacked then deputy leader Terje Søviknes in the turmoil around the sex scandal he was involved with at the time, insinuating him of fooling around with young girls and possible sexual assaults.

=== 2001 election ===
The suspension was restricted to a year only, but Kleppe chose to leave the party and contested the 2001 parliamentary election as a candidate for the Southern Norway List. His campaign failed and he received only 2.8% of the vote in Vest-Agder, a largely disappointing result as he was regarded as having a strong support there with an opinion poll in March where 17.5% said they would vote for him.

In early 2001 he had also apparently been nominated as the top candidate for the Liberal People's Party in two counties, but conflict erupted over the party's status. The dispute was resolved in June when they announced that they would launch the "Freedom Party", but the plans were never realised. Since this failed, they instead contested the election by a loose collection of county lists.

=== Democrats (2002–2023) ===
Kleppe went on to found the Democrats in 2002. He was elected as member of the Vest-Agder county council and the municipal council of Kristiansand Municipality in the 2003 local elections, and was re-elected again in 2007. Before the 2005 parliamentary election a poll showed that close to 10% of those voting for the Progress Party in Hordaland in 2003 would consider voting for Kleppe.

Kleppe has held speeches at several rallies of the anti-Muslim activist group Stop Islamisation of Norway (SIAN). In 2015 he also held a speech at a Pegida rally in Kristiansand.

In 2023, Kleppe and all the party's elected representatives in Kristiansand and Southern Norway were expelled from the party after Kleppe criticised the Russian invasion of Ukraine and demanded that Vladimir Putin be put on international trial, in opposition to the party's decision to oppose weapons support to Ukraine. He thereafter started the new "Kleppe List". He was re-elected to the Kristiansand municipal council the same year as the party's only representative.

== Political views ==
In 2005, the Christian conservative weekly newspaper Norge IDAG described him as a "Christian libertarian". When running for the 2007 local elections, Kleppe cited as his most important issues to fight for the weak in society and against poverty, as well as to stop the Islamisation and dechristianisation of Norway. To accomplish the latter, he sought to, among other things, remove all public economical support for Muslim religious societies. During the 1990s, he at various times suggested George H. W. Bush, the Salvation Army and Bill Clinton for the Nobel Peace Prize. He has publicly endorsed the controversial short film Fitna, made by Dutch politician Geert Wilders, and recommends everyone to see it.

In January 2009, Kleppe was denied membership of the eurosceptic organisation Nei til EU as he, according to its leader Heming Olaussen (a former member of the Socialist Left Party), stood for "racist attitudes". This action led to the resignations of a large number of members, including one county secretary citing it to be totally unintelligible to deny Kleppe membership, as he was "one of the greatest supporters of Nei til EU during the last EU-referendum". Kleppe, regarding this event, even received support from one of his strongest political rivals, Harald Sødal, a former Christian Democratic deputy mayor of Kristiansand.

After his suspension from the Progress Party in 2001, it has been noted that many of the proposals raised by Kleppe earlier, then being very controversial even within the Progress Party, has since been "copied" by the party. This include a proposal of limiting kontantstøtte (social security for children choosing not to go to kindergarten) to only Norwegian citizens in 1998, which was later raised by Per Sandberg in 2004. With his tough line against Islam, he later also welcomed controversial episodes of criticism of Islam by Carl I. Hagen in 2004 and Siv Jensen in 2009.

== Assaults by political opponents ==
In 1999 Kleppe was twice assaulted, both times by the pouring of beer over his head. First by Jan Otto Hauge, then editor of Journalisten, and secondly by singer-songwriter Lillebjørn Nilsen, with the latter getting a 100,000 kr fine, as well as losing a culture award he had been awarded by the municipality of Oslo.

In August 2005 Kleppe was physically assaulted by a former Workers' Communist Party deputy leader, and was thrown eggs at, physically assaulted, and had equipment for a public speech sabotaged by members of a demonstration by left-wing organisations SOS Racism, Blitz-movement and Socialist Youth. In 2003 he also received numerous death threats.
