= People's Movement Against Immigration =

Norwegian anti-immigration organisation

The People's Movement Against Immigration (Norwegian: Folkebevegelsen mot innvandring, FMI) is an organisation that works against immigration, based in Norway. The organisation was founded in 1987, and was initially led by Arne Myrdal who was later squeezed out due to his escalating and uncontrollable violent activism. The FMI sees itself as a nonpartisan interest organisation that works to "stop the foreign cultural mass immigration to Norway." According to their own political program, they seek to inform the public, political parties and politicians about the consequences of the mass immigration. The FMI were especially active in the late 1980s and early 1990s, gaining support of the national EU-resistance, but later, its activities and membership has been limited.

== Background ==
The FMI was founded in 1987, presumably in response to a further liberalisation of the Norwegian immigration policy earlier the same year. The organisation wanted to enforce the de jure "immigration stop" that was adopted by the Norwegian Parliament in 1975, but which never went into practical force. The prelude to the creation to the FMI was a letter signed by 145 Norwegian resistance veterans from the Second World War, which was sent to King Olav V of Norway. In it, they expressed their concern and regret that their fight for Norway's freedom would go to waste due to an immigration policy which would lead to "tragic consequences" for Norway as a nation-state. But source for this claim is missing.

== History ==
The FMI was founded in Haugesund on 3. October 1987, and already during its founding meeting had to get police protection from anti-FMI activists. For its annual meeting at a hotel in Arendal in 1989, demonstrators from groups including the Blitz movement illegally blocked the meeting from taking place, without the police intervening. While FMI members were spit on, kicked, beaten, harassed as "Nazi pigs", and blocked from entering the venue, the FMI leadership was trapped inside the building. While Arendal police chief Finn Steinkopf claimed the police could do nothing, Oslo police chief Willy Haugli said he was astonished that people were harassed while uniformed police just stood and watched. According to his own biography, the Oslo police chief already had a dubious leaning towards "mild" national socialists.

In April 1990, anti-racist activists again sought to block the annual meeting of the FMI without permission from the police. A few dozen anti-racist activists arrived to Fevik from Kristiansand in a bus, but was this time met by FMI activists wielding bats and other hand weapons like whips and nun-chakos. Five people were brought to the emergency room after the clashes, and Arne Myrdal was later convicted to four months' imprisonment for the attack. In June the same year, Myrdal was chased away from a legally arranged meeting in Tønsberg, when some hundred members of the Blitz movement, local residents and SOS Rasisme went to attack against FMI members.

Myrdal was squeezed out of the leadership of the FMI in April 1991, as he had become an embarrassment because of his militant activism. In turn, he formed his own group Norge Mot Innvandring (Norway Against Immigration, NMI).

In later years, the FMI has been less noted in the public spotlight. The organisation is nevertheless still active, with later activities including members writing letters to the editor in various newspapers. In 2007 and 2008, the organisation protested the plans of building a mosque in Førde.

== Leadership ==
- Arne Myrdal (1987–1988)
- Jan Høeg (1988–1989)
- Bjørn Voldnes (1989–1999)
- Bjarne Dahl (1999–2002)
- Bjørn Voldnes (2002–2008)
- Bjørnar Røyset (2008–)

== Bibliography ==
- Bjørgo, Tore (1997). "The anti-immigration discourse: 'resistance' against 'invaders' and 'national traitors'". In Modood, Tariq; Werbner, Pnina (eds.). The politics of multiculturalism in the new Europe: racism, identity, and community. Palgrave Macmillan. pp. 58–61. ISBN 978-1-85649-422-9.
