= Norway Democrats =

Norwegian political party

Norway Democrats Norgesdemokratene
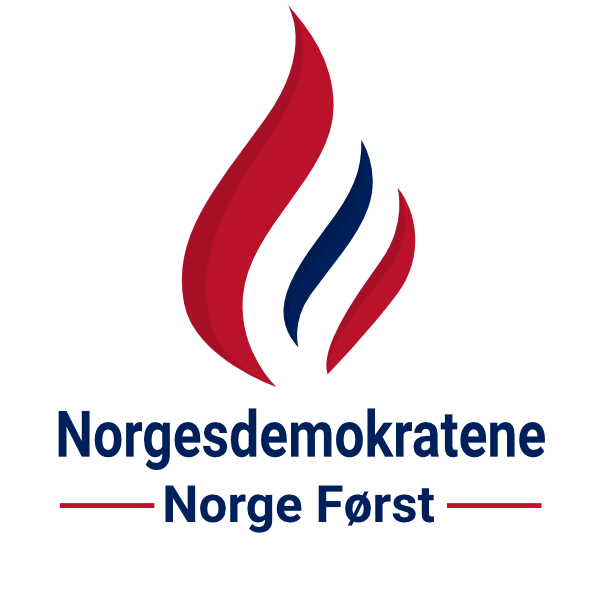
- Abbreviation: ND
- Leader: Anne Cecilie Kristensen
- Founder: Vidar Kleppe
- Founded: 24 August 2002
- Split from: Progress Party
- Headquarters: Gamle Ravei 347; 3270 Larvik
- Youth wing: Youth Democrats
- Ideology: National conservatism; Right-wing populism; Hard Euroscepticism; Anti-immigration; Direct democracy
- Political position: Far-right
- Colours: Blue; Red
- Slogan: Norge Først ('Norway First')
- Storting: 0 / 169
- County councils: 0 / 728
- Municipal councils: 10 / 10,781

Website
- norgesdemokratene.org

The Norway Democrats (Bokmål: Norgesdemokratene Nynorsk: Noregsdemokratane, ND) is a radical right national conservative and anti-globalist political party in Norway without parliamentary representation.

The party was founded in 2002, chiefly by former members of the Progress Party led by Vidar Kleppe. The Norway Democrats have a conservative, Norwegian nationalist-oriented profile, and a centrist profile on economic issues; key issues are raising the minimal state pension, removal of toll stations, opposition to the European Union and a popular vote on Norway's membership in EEC, and opposition to immigration. The party has never been represented in the Storting except for being joined by independent member of parliament Jan Simonsen in 2002, thus effectively being represented until the parliamentary term expired in 2005. The party claimed to have 3,500 registered members in 2013.

The former leader of the party who was elected in 2021, Geir Ugland Jacobsen, transformed the party into a pro-Russian mouthpiece, and the party founder Vidar Kleppe was expelled from the party in 2023 for voicing his opposition to the party being associated with Putinism. According to Kleppe there are far-right extremists in the party.

In 2025, the party hosted German far-right party Alternative for Germany (AfD) and others for a "remigration" conference in Oslo, and a tour of the Grønland neighbourhood.

== History ==
=== Foundation ===
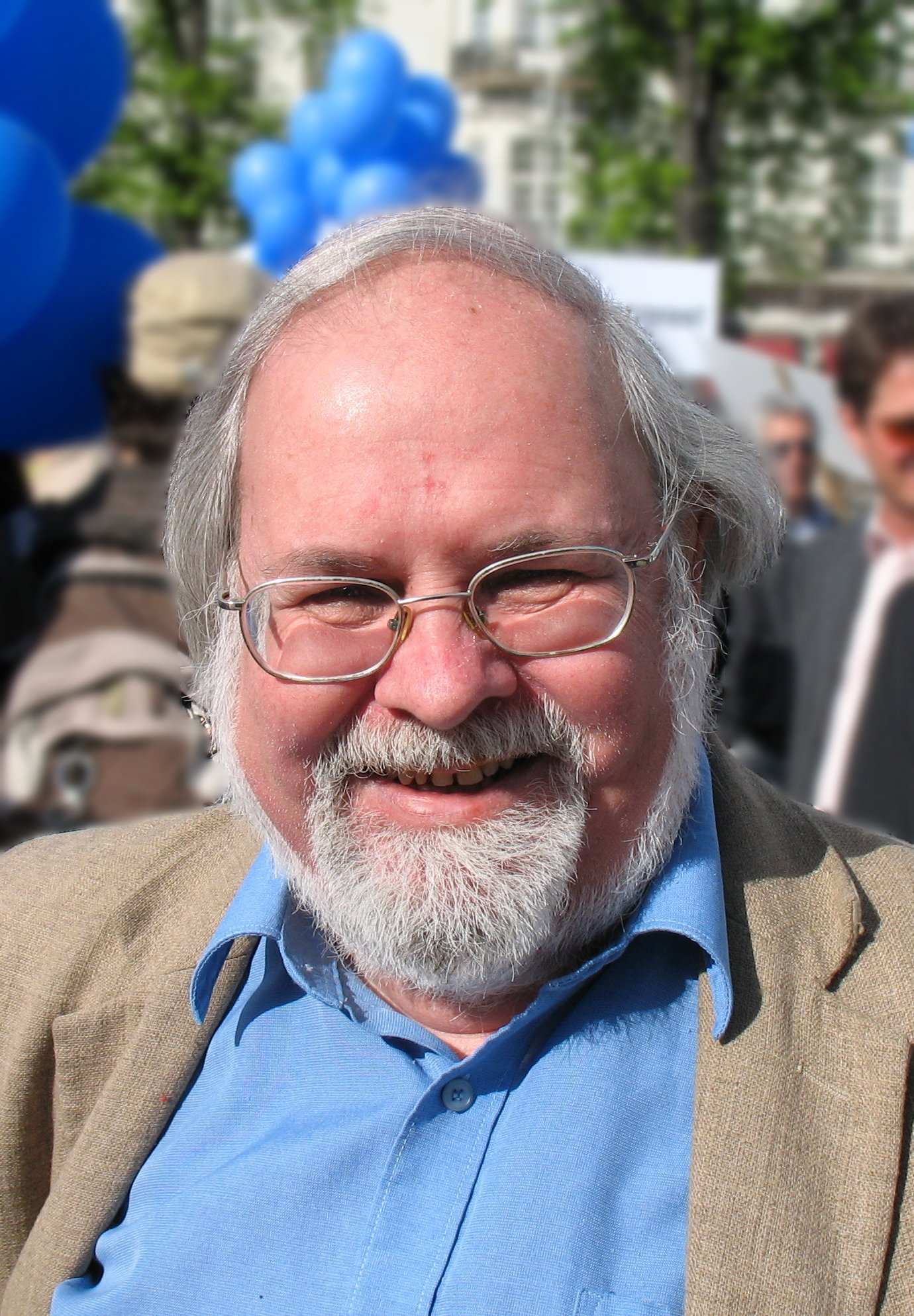
Jan Simonsen, who joined the Democrats while he was a member of parliament

The party was originally founded simply as the Democrats (Bokmål: Demokratene Nynorsk: Demokratane, DEM), and it bore this name from 2002 to 2010, and again from 2018 to 2023. From 2010 to 2018, it was known as the Democrats in Norway (Bokmål: Demokratene i Norge Nynorsk: Demokratane i Noreg, DiN).

The Democrats were founded on 24 August 2002 at Hotel Linne in Oslo, primarily by former Progress Party members, but also former members of the Labour Party, Conservative Party, Liberal Party and Socialist Left Party. In November of the same year, the party successfully gathered 5,200 signatures (5,000 required), and was legally registered as a party. The new party's leader, Vidar Kleppe, had a vision that the party should have a role as an ombudsman at grass roots level, similar to the role of Anders Lange, the first leader of the Progress Party. Since Member of Parliament Jan Simonsen (who was expelled from the Progress Party in 2001) joined the party upon its creation, the party was until 2005 also effectively represented in the Norwegian Parliament (technically, he had to sit as an independent).

One of the components of the new party was the minor Social Democrats, previously known as the Generation Party, which in turn had been formed as a splinter group of the Pensioners' Party. The Democrats originally tried to take advantage of this party's status to run for election. This led to a struggle about the Democrats' right to put up lists in more counties. The conflict was resolved, and subsequently both the Democrats and the Social Democrats were eligible to contest elections in Norway. Later, the Democrats went on to draw leading figures and members from parties such as the Fatherland Party and the Norwegian People's Party.

=== Early years (2002–2012) ===
Old logo of the party

By August 2003, the headquarters of the Democrats in Kristiansand had reportedly been vandalised eight times. In its first elections, the 2003 local elections, the Democrats ran in 46 municipalities and boroughs, and won 0.3% of the nationwide vote in the county elections. It won two representatives in the municipal council of Kristiansand Municipality, and one in the Vest-Agder county council. In 2005, the Democrats became represented in the municipal council for Bergen Municipality owing to the defection of a Progress Party councillor.

The party stepped up its activity with the aim of gaining a foothold in the Norwegian Parliament at the 2005 parliamentary election. Before the election, party leader Vidar Kleppe tried to bolster support for the party by calling for the closure of all Mosques in Norway if they did not clearly distance themselves from terrorism. Candidates running for the party also had to withstand threats and attacks during the electoral campaign. This included Nordland county leader Amund Garfors receiving death threats, and party leader Vidar Kleppe being physically assaulted both by a former Workers' Communist Party deputy leader, and by members of a demonstration by left-wing organisations SOS Rasisme, the Blitz-movement and Socialist Youth. Despite running a high-profile campaign, the Democrats failed to make any breakthrough in the election.

The Democrats increased their number of candidates for the 2007 local elections, and ran in 85 municipalities and boroughs, as well as in all 19 counties. The party won 0.3% of the overall vote in the county elections, and kept its representation in the Vest-Agder county council. It gained eight municipal councillors, among them in the cities of Trondheim and Kristiansand. For the 2009 parliamentary election the Democrats for the first time ran in all the counties in Norway. The Democrats complained about the Norwegian Broadcasting Corporation to the OSCE, as the party along with other extraparliamentary parties that ran in all 19 counties had been denied television coverage (except the Red Party). Only a few weeks before the 2009 election, the headquarters of the Democrats were broken into, and a computer containing material planned for use in the election campaign was stolen. In the election, the party remained at 0.1% of the vote.

The Democrats had to renew its public registration owing to the poor 2009 election result, and chose to re-register itself as the "Democrats in Norway". The party only ran in 31 municipalities for the 2011 local elections. It nevertheless again won eight municipal councillors, this time in five councils (two councillors in three councils), and held its representation in the Vest-Agder county council. Besides its two representatives in Kristiansand (in Vest-Agder), all of the party's municipal councillors were elected in Hordaland. After the election, the party became part of local cooperations that would govern Kristiansand Municipality and Stord Municipality.

=== Present era (2012–present) ===
Vidar Kleppe stepped down as leader in 2012 and was succeeded by Kjell Arne Sellæg. The change in leadership was followed by internal strife and resignations. Eleven weeks after his appointment as leader, Sellæg left the Democrats to form a new party, the Moderates. He was succeeded by Elisabeth Rue Strencbo. In 2013 the party elected Fredrik U. Litleskare as new leader of the party. Litleskare withdrew from the position in 2014 citing internal non-political conflicts, and was succeeded by Ellen Simonsen as acting leader. In 2015 Terje Svendsen was elected new leader. In 2016, Kim Steinar Kjærner-Strømberg was elected new leader, until he was exposed and expelled for having given a fraudulent background. He was succeeded by Makvan Kasheikal, an immigrant from Iran.

In the 2019 local elections, the party gained popularity and became the third political force in the city council of Kristiansand with 13.4% of the votes. The former party leader, Geir Ugland Jacobsen who is a contributor to the Russian propaganda channel RT, then transformed the party into a pro-Russian voice in the political debate. The party's website refers to Ukraine as the "Kyiv regime" and accuses the West of warmongering in Ukraine.

The party underwent another name change in 2023, adopting its current name and logo. The same year, party founder Vidar Kleppe and all the party's elected representatives in Kristiansand and Southern Norway were expelled from the party after Kleppe criticised the Russian invasion of Ukraine, in opposition to the party's decision to oppose weapons support to Ukraine. Kleppe stated that he cannot accept that the party should be associated with Putinism. In the 2023 local elections the party received only 0.3% of the votes in Kristiansand, its previous stronghold.

== Political profile ==
The main issues for the party are law and order, increased help for the elderly and disabled, and a restrictive immigration and asylum policy. The principles of the Norway Democrats are built on Christian values, and Norwegian culture and tradition. The party opposes mass immigration and increased Islamic influence, fearing that Western liberal values such as human rights and the Christian heritage will be endangered. It also seeks drastic measures against crime. When questioned about the party's place on the political spectrum, former Democrats' leader Vidar Kleppe responded that the Democrats are "in many ways a centrist party." As of 2015, the party officially described itself as a "national value-conservative" party. The Norway Democrats consider the Danish People's Party and the Sweden Democrats to be their sister parties. The party has been characterised by media and scholars as a radical-right populist party.

=== Law and order ===
The Norway Democrats identify the causes of the recent upsurge in serious crime in Norway to be a result of low penalties, liberal immigration policies, and a lack of funding for the police, courts and prison system. The party wants to raise the sentence frame of first-degree murder to life imprisonment, and otherwise raise minimum sentence frames. It does not support giving penalty discounts for multiple offences, and wants instead to add up penalties for every single offence. The party wants to double sentences for second-time offenders, triple sentences for third-time offenders and so on.

=== Immigration ===
One of the main issues for the Norway Democrats is immigration to Norway, and the party wants a strongly restrictive immigration policy. The party maintains that mass-immigration to western countries leads to considerable problems that are hard to solve, including considerable costs for social security payments and great increases in crime. The party believes that Norway's liberal values will be put in danger if a "Muslim mass immigration" is accepted. The party wants a stricter policy towards criminal immigrants, for instance allowing for the repatriation of immigrants participating in organized and gang-crime.

The party also claims that the current Norwegian refugee-policy is cynical in that it seeks to help the few refugees who can afford the journey to Norway, when there are millions of people suffering worldwide without such possibilities. The Norway Democrats seek to change the refugee-policy to instead helping people outside the Norwegian border. They claim that in that way the Norwegian state can afford to help much more refugees for the same amount of money that it requires to help considerably fewer people in Norway.

=== Foreign policy ===
The Norway Democrats are opposed to Norwegian membership in the European Union, and wants Norway to withdraw from the European Economic Area and the Schengen Agreement. The party wants to replace membership of the EEA with a free trade agreement.

While supporting continued membership of NATO and the United Nations, it contends that the latter must reform. The party supports increased free trade, and wants to dissolve state-controlled foreign aid. The party only supports foreign aid to countries pursuing free-market policies, but maintains support to countries in cases of natural disasters, war and famine. Supportive of Israel, the party proposes to move the Norwegian embassy to what it describes as "the country's capital, Jerusalem."

== Election results ==
=== Storting ===
Election	Leader	Votes	%	Seats	+/–	Position	Status
2005	Vidar Kleppe	2,705	0.1	0 / 169	0	13th	Extra-parliamentary
2009	Vidar Kleppe	2,285	0.1	0 / 169	0	13th	Extra-parliamentary
2013	Fredrik U. Litleskare	2,214	0.1	0 / 169	0	▼14th	Extra-parliamentary
2017	Makvan Kasheikal	3,830	0.1	0 / 169	0	14th	Extra-parliamentary
2021	Geir Ugland Jacobsen	33,280	1.2	0 / 169	0	▲10th	Extra-parliamentary
2025	Geir Ugland Jacobsen	23,260	0.7	0 / 169	0	▼11th	Extra-parliamentary

=== Local representation ===
As of the 2011 local elections (0.3% county results), the party is represented in one county, Vest-Agder (1), and five municipalities; Kristiansand (2), Askøy (2), Odda (2), Fedje (1), and Stord (1)

== Endorsements ==
The Democrats have been endorsed by several notable figures in Norway. One of the co-founders of the party was former coach of the football club IK Start, Karsten Johannessen, who has since been a repeated low-key candidate for the party. In the 2005 parliamentary election, the Democrats were endorsed by former boxer Ole Klemetsen and former pop singer Gry Jannicke Jarlum, who both stood as low-key candidates. Professional Elvis impersonator Kjell Elvis has long endorsed Vidar Kleppe, and subsequently the Democrats, and stood as a low-key candidate for it in 2011. Country artist Åsmund Åmli stood as a low-key candidate for the party in both the 2007 and 2011 local elections.

== Party leaders ==
- Vidar Kleppe (2002–2012)
- Kjell Arne Sellæg (2012)
- Elisabeth Rue Strencbo (2012–2013)
- Fredrik U. Litleskare (2013–2014)
- Ellen Simonsen (2014–2015)
- Terje Svendsen (2015–2016)
- Kim Steinar Kjærner-Strømberg (2016)
- Makvan Kasheikal (2016–2021)
- Geir Ugland Jacobsen (2021–2026)
- Anne Cecilie Kristensen (2026–)
