= Stop the Immigration =

Stop Immigration Stopp Innvandringen
- Leader: Jack Erik Kjuus
- Founded: 15 September 1987
- Dissolved: 1995
- Succeeded by: White Electoral Alliance
- Membership: 5,000 (1989)
- Ideology: Anti-immigration
- Political position: Right-wing

Stop the Immigration (Norwegian: Stopp Innvandringen, SI) was a political party in Norway, founded by Jack Erik Kjuus in 1987. The party was never particularly successful, and its only elected representative was in the Drammen city council, in both 1991 and 1995. The party was succeeded by the White Electoral Alliance in 1995.

== History ==
Stop the Immigration was founded on 15 September 1987 by Jack Erik Kjuus. The party was formally registered on 27 April 1988, after having collected the required 3,000 signatures. The first election it contested was the 1989 parliamentary election, where the party received 0.3% of the votes, and thus no parliamentary representation. Its first candidates included Erik Gjems-Onstad in Akershus and Harald Trefall in Hordaland. In the 1989 school elections, the party received 1.4% of the votes nationwide, and 2.5% in Oslo.

In the 1991 local elections, the party received enough votes to get elected into the Drammen city council, where Frank Hove took the seat. In the 1993 parliamentary election, the party won 0.1% of the vote nationwide. In the 1993 school elections, the party received 4.1% of the vote in Oslo. Hove was re-elected in the 1995 local elections with 2.3% of the votes in Drammen, but in 1995 Kjuus chose to merge the party with a marginal second group, Send de fremmedkulturelle hjem, eller så mister vi landet vårt, to form the White Electoral Alliance.

== Political platform ==
The party had one issue on its party program; to encourage immigrants and refugees to return to their native country, and if necessary send them out by force. The party used the slogan "Norway for Norwegians" before the 1989 election. In its manifesto for the 1995 election, it planned to relinquish the Geneva Convention, not let any refugees or asylum seekers into the country, and use the funds allocated for foreign aid to send foreigners back home.

== Election results ==
=== Parliamentary elections ===
Year	Result #	Result %
1989	8,963	0.3% #10
1993	1,952	0.1% #14

=== Local elections ===
Year	Result #	Result %
1991	4,088	0.2%
1995	1,252	0.1%
