= SOS Rasisme =

Logo of SOS Rasisme

SOS Rasisme was a Norwegian organisation, whose stated goal was to "fight racism and nazism." It was founded in 1985, as the Norwegian sister organisation of the French SOS Racisme. It went bankrupt in 2013 after being convicted of defrauding the government and the Norwegian Children and Youth Council by reporting grossly exaggerated membership figures in order to obtain public funding. The police subsequently opened an investigation of the organisation and indicted ten of its key officials for fraud, embezzlement and money laundering.

It claimed to be Europe's largest anti-racist membership organisation, with more than 40,000 members, but the claims were found to be false by Haugaland district court. The last president before its bankruptcy was Trond Thorbjørnsen and the last executive director was Kjell Gunnar Larsen. SOS Rasisme claimed to have more than 270 local chapters all over Norway.

SOS Rasisme faced strong criticism from the media in Norway and from all mainstream political parties over several years due to its dominance by the Marxist-Leninist-Maoist organization, Serve the People – The Communist League. SOS Rasisme has described its critics, including the Norwegian Children and Youth Council, as "Nazis."

== Criticism of SOS Rasisme ==
On 16 January 2006, the Norwegian newspaper Dagens Næringsliv claimed that SOS Rasisme was dominated and influenced by people on the far left in Norwegian politics, and questioned whether the large number of members was actually correct or a falsification. SOS Rasisme has denied all claims that their membership figures were false.

On 9 September 2009, Norwegian radio station P4 ran a story claiming that five of the leaders of SOS Rasisme are also high-ranking members of a revolutionary Communist organisation called Tjen Folket ("Serve the People"). P4 quoted Khalid Salimi, the founder of SOS Rasisme, as saying he was ousted from the organisation by the communists, and that SOS Rasisme was at that time run almost exclusively by white Norwegian communists. Salimi estimated that there were actually more "darkeys" in the Progress Party, a Norwegian political party with an immigration skeptic agenda, than in SOS Rasisme.

== Withdrawal of public funding in 2010 ==
On 1 March 2010, the Public Council for Norwegian Child and Youth Organisations (Norwegian: Landsrådet for Norges Barne- og ungdomsorganisasjoner, LNU) announced that they withdrew public funding given to SOS Rasisme. The reason was that the number of members and local chapters reported by SOS Rasisme seemed to be incorrect, and they were in doubt about whether the money to the organisation was going out to the local chapters. It was uncovered that SOS Rasisme had used the money to buy real estate by channeling state grants through a company called Aktivisteiendom AS (Activist Real Estate). It was also uncovered that SOS Rasisme offered a so-called "family membership", where members could enroll members of their family into SOS Rasisme simply by stating their first name, without any documentation that the family members in question even existed or were willing to join the organisation. Government funding of SOS Rasisme was based on the total number of members. The treasurer of SOS Rasisme, Kjell Gunnar Larsen, denied any wrongdoing, and claimed that the probe carried out by LNU was part of an organised campaign by far-right groups.

In October 2009, the auditing firm KPMG carried out an audit of SOS Rasisme's membership lists in three Norwegian cities. The investigation found that about half of the people on the membership roster, which was used as a basis for calculating public funding, denied being members of SOS Rasisme. The report also found several instances of infants younger than one year of age being signed up as members by older family members.

== Activists infiltrated anti-Islam group ==
On 11 March 2012 Norwegian newspaper Dagbladet revealed that from its beginnings in 2010 and until the spring of 2011 the leadership of the Norwegian Defence League, an anti-Islam group with close links to the English Defence League, was infiltrated by members of SOS Rasisme. Several anonymous sources told the newspaper that the anti-racists in fact were in majority on the governing board. One of the sources, and an SOS Rasisme member, was one of the NDL board members. Another SOS Rasisme member whom the sources alleged to have been an NDL board member denied the claims. The anti-racists were allegedly using false identities and were reporting directly back to SOS Rasisme. According to the newspaper, Lena Andreassen who was leader of the NDL in the spring of 2011 didn't know about the infiltration. Ronny Alte, NDL spokesperson until April 2012, confirmed they had come to realise that there were infiltrators in the NDL in 2011.
