= List of Progress Party (Norway) MPs =

This is a list of Progress Party MPs. It includes all Members of Parliament elected to the Parliament of Norway (Stortinget) representing the Progress Party from 1973. Until 1977, the name of the party was Anders Lange's Party. The party was not represented in Parliament between 1977 and 1981.

== List of MPs ==
=== A ===
- John Alvheim, Telemark, 1989–2005
- Per-Willy Amundsen, Troms, 2005–present
- Torbjørn Andersen, Aust-Agder, 1997–2009
- Anders Anundsen, Vestfold, 2005–present
- Hans Frode Asmyhr, Akershus, 2005–present

=== B ===
- Petter Bjørheim, Rogaland, 1989–93
- Per Roar Bredvold, Hedmark, 1997–present
- Stephen Bråthen, Akershus, 1993–94

=== C ===
- Ellen Chr. Christiansen, Oslo, 1993–94

=== D ===
- Dag Danielsen, Oslo, 1997–2001

=== E ===
- Jan Arild Ellingsen, Nordland, 2001–present
- Robert Eriksson, Nord-Trøndelag, 2005–present
- Erling Erland, Rogaland, 1973–77
- Ursula Evje, Akershus, 1997–2004

=== F ===
- Kåre Fostervold, Telemark, 2005–09
- Jan-Henrik Fredriksen, Finnmark, 2005–present
- Jan Erik Fåne, Akershus, 1989–93

=== G ===
- Vigdis Giltun, Østfold, 2005–present
- Erik Gjems-Onstad, Akershus, 1973–76
- Ingebjørg Godskesen, Aust-Agder, 2009–present
- Oskar Jarle Grimstad, Møre og Romsdal, 2009–present
- Fridtjof Frank Gundersen, Akershus, 1981–85; 1989–2001
- Jon Jæger Gåsvatn, Østfold, 2005–present

=== H ===
- Carl I. Hagen, Oslo, 1981–2009
- Gjermund Hagesæter, Hordaland, 2001–present
- Mette Hanekamhaug, Møre og Romsdal, 2009–present
- Knut Hanselmann, Hordaland, 1989–93
- Øystein Hedstrøm, Østfold, 1989–2005
- Oscar D. Hillgaar, Vestfold, 1989–94
- Bård Hoksrud, Telemark, 2005–present
- Solveig Horne, Rogaland, 2005–present
- Morten Høglund, Akershus, 2001–present

=== J ===
- Harry Jensen, Nordland, 1989–90
- Siv Jensen, Oslo, 1997–present
- Morten Ørsal Johansen, Oppland, 2009–present

=== K ===
- Kari Kjønaas Kjos, Akershus, 2005–present
- Vidar Kleppe, Vest-Agder, 1989–93; 1997–2001
- Terje Knudsen, Hordaland, 1997–2001
- Ulf Erik Knudsen, Buskerud, 1997–present
- Øyvind Korsberg, Troms, 1997–present
- André Kvakkestad, Akershus, 2001–2005

=== L ===
- Anders Lange, Oslo, 1973–74
- Ulf Leirstein, Østfold, 2005–present
- Tord Lien, Sør-Trøndelag, 2005–present

=== M ===
- Jens Marcussen, Rogaland, 1981–85; 1989–93
- Steinar Maribo, Buskerud, 1989–93
- Åse Michaelsen, Vest-Agder, 2005–present
- Per Erik Monsen, Vestfold, 1997–2005
- Peter N. Myhre, Oslo, 2009–present

=== N ===
- Harald T. Nesvik, Møre og Romsdal, 1997–present
- Thore A. Nistad, Oppland, 1997–2009
- Terje Nyberget, Troms, 1989–93

=== O ===
- Per Arne Olsen, Vestfold, 2009–present

=== R ===
- Peder I. Ramsrud, Oppland, 1989–93
- Laila Marie Reiertsen, Hordaland, 2009–present
- Per Risvik, Sør-Trøndelag, 1989–93
- Jørund Rytman, Buskerud, 2005–present
- Henrik Rød, Østfold, 2001–05
- Hans J. Røsjorde, Hordaland, 1989–93

=== S ===
- Per Sandberg, Nord-Trøndelag, 1997–2005; Sør-Trøndelag, 2005–present
- Jan Simonsen, Rogaland, 1989–2001
- Pål Atle Skjervengen, Oslo, 1989–93
- Henning Skumsvoll, Vest-Agder, 2005–present
- Harald Bjarne Slettebø, Hordaland, 1973–77
- Lodve Solholm, Hordaland, 1989–93; 1997–2009
- Ketil Solvik-Olsen, Rogaland, 2005–present
- Arne Sortevik, Hordaland, 2001–present
- Jørn L. Stang, Østfold, 1997–2001
- Åge Starheim, Sogn og Fjordane, 2005–present
- Christopher Stensaker, Sør-Trøndelag, 1997–2005
- Kenneth Svendsen, Nordland, 1997–present

=== T ===
- Ib Thomsen, Akershus, 2005–present
- Finn Thoresen, Akershus, 1989–92
- Bente Thorsen, Rogaland, 2009–present
- Torgeir Trældal, Nordland, 2009–present
- Christian Tybring-Gjedde, Oslo, 2005–present

=== V ===
- Øyvind Vaksdal, Rogaland, 1997–present

=== W ===
- Tor Mikkel Wara, Oslo, 1989–93
- Roy N. Wetterstad, Buskerud, 1993–94
- Per Ove Width, Vestfold, 1997–2009
- Karin S. Woldseth, Hordaland, 2001–present

=== Y ===
- Bjørn Erling Ytterhorn, Hordaland, 1981–87
- Inger-Marie Ytterhorn, Hordaland, 1989–93
