= 1994 Progress Party national convention =

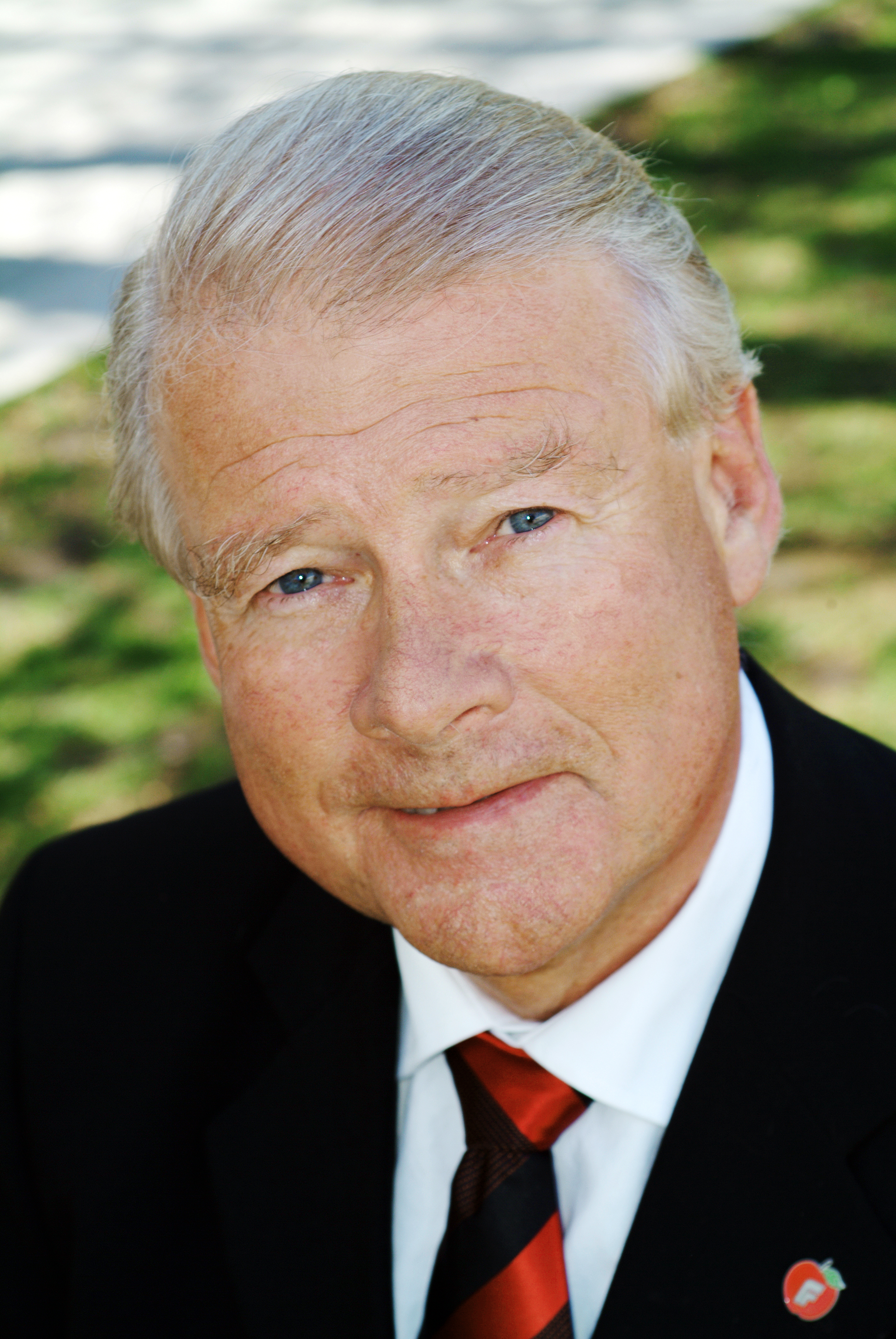
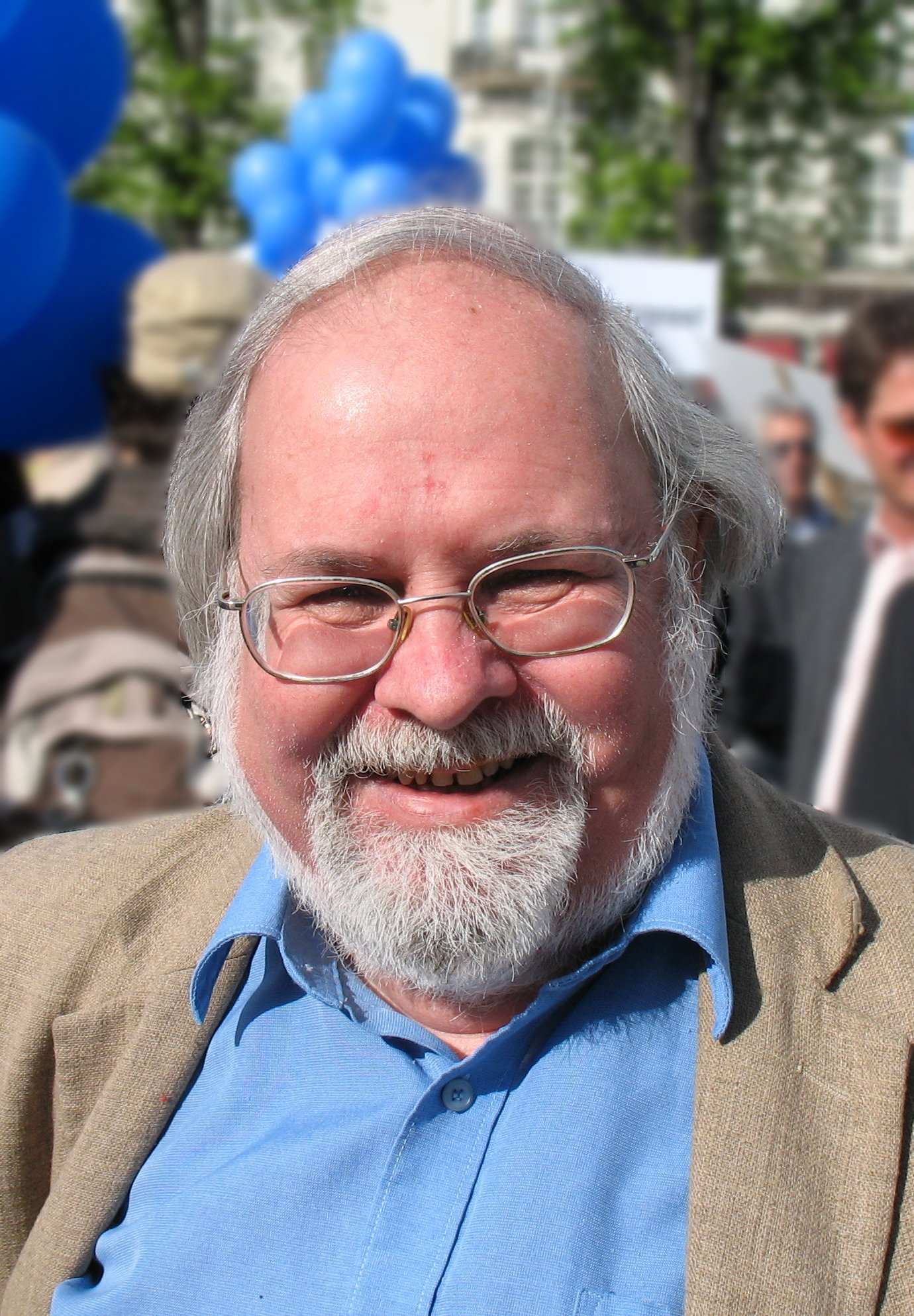
- Carl I. Hagen and Jan Simonsen; two leading members of the traditionalist (populist) faction of the party

Convention
- Date(s): 15 April – 17 April
- City: Bolkesjø, Telemark
- Venue: Bolkesjø Turisthotell

Elected leadership
- Party leader: Carl I. Hagen
- Deputy leader(s): Lodve Solholm; Hans J. Røsjorde

Representatives
- Delegates: 156
- Votes Needed for Nomination: 78
- Results (Party leader): 111

The 1994 national convention of the Progress Party of Norway was held from 15 April to 17 April at the hotel Bolkesjø Turisthotell in Bolkesjø, Telemark. It was originally set up to be a normal convention with 157 delegates in a non-election year, but because of mounting antagonism between a traditionalist and a libertarian faction, it became clear some months before the conventions that personal positions could be at stake. The party leader seat, held by Carl I. Hagen since 1978, was up for re-election. The deputy leaders Ellen Wibe and Hans J. Røsjorde was not up for election until 1995, but there were talks about forming a motion of no confidence against Wibe. The political disagreements roughly corresponded to a cleavage between two factions.

The traditionalist (also called populist) faction was represented by party leader Carl I. Hagen, Jan Simonsen, Fridtjof Frank Gundersen, Vidar Kleppe, Øystein Hedstrøm, Lodve Solholm and Eli Hagen. The libertarians of the party were first and foremost the deputy leader Ellen Wibe and four members of Parliament (by some called the "band of four"), Ellen Christine Christiansen, Oscar D. Hillgaar, Roy N. Wetterstad and Stephen Bråthen. Buskerud county leader Geir Thoresen, Akershus county leader Per Aage Pleym Christensen and Youth of the Progress Party leader Lars Erik Grønntun were other prominent libertarians. Both during the preceding months and on the opening day, resolutions were passed which ensured full dominance for Carl I. Hagen and the policies of his faction. Wibe resigned as deputy leader, and Carl I. Hagen's men (there were no women left in the leadership) also dominated the new central committee. The personal issues totally overshadowed the regular political debate, and as early as on 17 April the convention was famously dubbed as the "national convention at Dolkesjø"—derived from dolk, the Norwegian word for dagger.

In April and May, the Progress Party lost several members, including former members of Parliament and four sitting members of Parliament. In July the Youth of the Progress Party dissolved itself in protest of the events; however, a new, loyal organization immediately surfaced. Some of the withdrawn members joined the Conservative Party of Norway, others joined an entirely new organization (originally with the narrow intention to support the four parliamentarians), the quasi-political party Free Democrats.

== Run-up ==
=== Before 1994 ===
The 1993 national convention was harmonic. The newspaper Verdens Gang remarked that both "the libertarians and the populists cheered" after Carl I. Hagen's speeches. Jan Simonsen stepped down as deputy leader, and Ellen Wibe succeeded him, being one of the few women in the Progress Party's leadership.

There were some tensions, however. Finn Thoresen left the party in November 1992, and later formed New Future Coalition Party. More importantly, because of disagreements in 1992 and 1993, pertaining to libertarianism in general and especially the European Union question, several libertarians that had entered the Progress Party in the 1980s ceased their activity in the party. MPs Tor Mikkel Wara and Petter Bjørheim announced their intentions to leave politics after the end of their terms, as did Pål Atle Skjervengen. Jan Erik Fåne tried to win renomination, but the nomination meeting in Akershus put traditionalist Fridtjof Frank Gundersen on top of the ballot. Fåne was offered the second spot, but pulled out. Eight months later it turned out that holding the second spot on the ballot did indeed give a Parliament seat.

The issue of libertarianism became more pressing in the campaign for the 1993 Norwegian parliamentary election, when Carl I. Hagen said to Verdens Gang that he did not support cutting the income tax. This was not in line with official party policy, and Hagen did not confer with the party, stating that "I had to take an independent initiative". Ellen Wibe openly criticized the statement, so did former MP and tax spokesperson Steinar Maribo. The tax statement was later seen as the most important factor contributing to the growing Hagen—liberalist schism. In the election the Progress Party won ten seats, down from 22 in the 1989 election.

Name	Constituency	Name	Constituency
Regular members
Fridtjof Frank Gundersen	Akershus	Stephen Bråthen^{1}	Akershus
Roy N. Wetterstad^{1}	Buskerud	Hans J. Røsjorde	Hordaland
Carl I. Hagen	Oslo	Ellen Christine Christiansen^{1}	Oslo
Jan Simonsen	Rogaland	John Alvheim	Telemark
Oscar D. Hillgaar^{1}	Vestfold	Øystein Hedstrøm	Østfold
Deputy members
Bente Bjørnstad	Akershus	Geir Thoresen^{1}	Buskerud
Inger-Marie Ytterhorn	Hordaland	Arve Lønnum, Jr.	Oslo
Øyvind Vaksdal	Rogaland	Terje Ottar	Telemark
Erik Andersen	Vestfold	Jon Jæger Gåsvatn	Østfold

^{1} = Left the Progress Party as a result of the convention.

=== 1994 ===
The year 1994 started with annual conventions in each county, scheduled between 15 January and 6 April. These conventions elected delegates to the national convention. Tension had mounted between party leader Carl I. Hagen and other factions in the party. Parts of the central committee were skeptical to Hagen's position and policies. In addition, the youth wing, Youth of the Progress Party, had experienced disagreements with the Hagen-led Progress Party. The leader of the Youth of the Progress Party, Lars Erik Grønntun, had been on the verge of stepping down, but was persuaded around the end of 1993 to run for re-election. Before the county conventions, Grønntun stated a desire for an extraordinary meeting between the party and its youth wing, where he wanted to "contribute to gathering the party and avoid any signs of a split".

On 3 January, Hagen presented a ten-point plan of action. It was to be sent to each county chapter, and supported or rejected at the county conventions. On 7 January, Ellen Wibe presented a competing plan of action together with Oscar Hillgaar, Ellen Christine Christiansen and Geir Thoresen. Wibe's plan criticized the party's organizational culture, communication and institutions. In an interview, Wibe said that the party was too similar to a "charismatic movement", and that she wanted more power to the central board (Norwegian: sentralstyre). Øystein Hedstrøm announced a possible motion of no confidence regarding Ellen Wibe's position as deputy party leader, even though she was not really up for election until 1995. Wibe replied that her intention was to gather the party.

=== County conventions and national board meeting ===
In the weekend from 4 to 6 February, county conventions were held in eleven counties, including Hagen's native Oslo, and Buskerud, Finnmark, Telemark, Vest-Agder, Hordaland, Nordland, Østfold, Troms, Nord-Trøndelag and Møre og Romsdal. Hagen belonged to the Oslo chapter, but the leader of the chapter, Peter N. Myhre, stated beforehand that Hagen's proposal would probably be rejected. It was speculated that rejections could come from the Buskerud and Finnmark's conventions as well. On 7 February, Hagen confirmed his leadership candidacy for the electoral committee.

On 19 February, the party held a national board (Norwegian: landsstyre) meeting at Bolkesjø. Here, Hagen proposed to close the debate on "the party profile and choice of values", a motion which gained support from 11 of the 24 board members. Ellen Wibe was among the minority, but conceded for the time being. That way, the question was put down before reaching the national convention.

By then, fifteen county conventions had signalized support for Hagen. After the last convention, it was clear that one-third of the delegates had expressed support of Wibe. Before the national convention, Hagen stated in an interview that one "never can know what will happen during a Progress Party national convention".

=== Further preparations ===
The next two months was a quiet period, and Øystein Hedstrøm stated that Wibe had taken a more responsible role, and thus there was no need for a motion of no confidence. News commentator Aslak Bonde remarked that the compromise reached by the factions was "unclear" and that antagonism could surface at the national convention. Wibe stated that her faction still intended to submit a resolution, a "constructive" proposal regarding tactical and organizational issues. Two days before the national convention, this resolution text had not been submitted to the county delegates. On the next day, the resolution text was commented in newspapers. Aftenposten remarked that Wibe's proposal was a "thorough criticism of Carl I. Hagen", among others in that it called for "a renewal of the party". It was signed by Oscar D. Hillgaar, Ellen Chr. Christiansen, Stephen Bråthen and Roy Wetterstad together with Wibe. Verdens Gang reported that Wibe would resign if not given a clear confidence as deputy leader. Wibe refuted this in Aftenposten on the next day; the newspaper believed that no party split would occur.

Another question of contention was the Progress Party's policy on Norwegian membership in the European Union. Reportedly, Carl I. Hagen wanted to postpone a decision on European Union policy from the national convention to a national board meeting in June. Others were not in favor of this. In an interview, Hagen stated that political parties should not agitate officially for one opinion or the other. He stated an indifference towards EU membership, and that if accessing the Union, Norway could always use a veto against EU policies when needed. Central board member Terje Sæbø submitted a competing resolution which opposed Norwegian membership.

== Meeting ==
Carl I. Hagen held the opening speech of the convention. The speech was interrupted by extensive applause nineteen times. In it, he stated:

In case one wants a label, that would, in accordance with our ideological basis, be a Christian-Libertarian party. The New Testament is packed with libertarian ideas of freedom and emphasizes voluntarity and personal responsibility. For those who criticize our values, I warmly recommend some Bible reading.

=== Resolutions and withdrawals ===
One of the first questions which was voted over, was the EU issue. Hagen formally submitted a proposal that the factual aspects of this issue should not be debated, and this was passed with 113 against 44 votes.

The EU vote directly caused Ellen Wibe to step down as deputy party leader, stating that she did "not fully understand the new profile of the party". If not stepping down, she would compromise "values and principles" that were essential in order to "live with [her]self as a human being". The announcement followed a private meeting between Wibe, Hagen, Røsjorde and Grønntun. Allegedly, Tor Mikkel Wara had advised her to resign. Ellen Christine Christiansen stepped down from her position in the central board, leaving Grønntun as the only clear libertarian. Grønntun stated that young party members would not tolerate to be "stepped on and hectored with [sic]" forever. More generally, the losing faction signalized a desire to continue promoting a liberal political profile, but in a less dramatic way.

Immediately after Wibe's announcement, Jan Simonsen entered the chair and spoke strongly in favor of Hagen. Fridtjof Frank Gundersen applauded the end of "women's bickering" in the party leadership. Hagen's main resolution proposal, titled En fremtid med rot i fortiden, was passed with 94 against 50 votes. He also received support for prioritizing anti-immigration higher in the following period. In his closing speech, Hagen stated that "disloyal" behavior would be considered as "active withdrawal" from the party. From the rostrum, the "band of four" was even asked to withdraw by several delegates, including Bjørn Andreassen, Gustav Hareide and Frøydis Lange. Andreassen exclaimed that "we don't want you", while Lange asked the band of four to form a new party called the Anarchist Party.

The central board held an extraordinary meeting on 17 April, during a pre-scheduled break in the convention. The central board of the Youth of the Progress Party also met, and agreed to support the "band of four". Their decision was not final until an extraordinary national board meeting could be held. It was speculated that members of the youth wing could leave the Progress Party en masse.

=== New deputy leader ===
After Wibe's resignation, Jan Simonsen was mentioned as an, albeit unlikely, candidate to succeed Wibe. Vidar Kleppe was also mentioned, while traditionalist John Alvheim was regarded by newspapers as a more likely candidate. On Saturday 16 April, it became clear that the vote stood between the Peter N. Myhre and Lodve Solholm. Myhre was the candidate put forward by the electoral committee, and had support among the libertarians, who did not field their own candidate. On 17 April, Solholm won the vote with 90 against 58; 8 ballots were blank. Carl I. Hagen was re-elected with 113 against 0 votes, and with 44 blank ballots. One libertarian, former MP Terje Nyberget, who described the convention as a "genocide", was elected to the national board.

== Aftermath ==
Political scientist Frank Aarebrot summed up the convention turmoil in the following way:

This is one of the most peculiar things to happen in Norwegian political history.

=== Band of four defect ===
Already on the second day of the convention it was speculated that the "band of four", four libertarian-leaning members of Parliament, considered leaving the party. The four were Oscar D. Hillgaar, Roy Wetterstad, Ellen Christine Christiansen and Stephen Bråthen. The alternative to leaving the party was to mark themselves as dissenting party members. On the third day, news surfaced that the four had talked together. In the news program Dagsrevyen on 17 April, the band of four stated a desire to follow the 1993 party platform and not later resolutions. They were met by a demand from Carl I. Hagen that they continue on the "terms laid down by the national convention or find something else to do". He later added that if the band of four left the parliamentary group, they should "scram". To sum up, he said that the libertarians, which were known to be a minority, had gained too much influence, and was set back by the national convention. Øystein Hedstrøm demanded that the four leave the party. Because of the fierce personal antagonism at the convention, it was dubbed as the "national convention at Dolkesjø"—derived from dolk, the Norwegian word for dagger.

Wibe encouraged people to stay in the Progress Party, although her active participation was over. Wetterstad stated in an interview that withdrawing his party membership was out of question, whereas Hillgaar was described as the least conciliatory. Hillgaar publicly lamented the "Moscow processes" of the 1994 national convention, and also the views on women and the "extreme xenophobia" which he felt was conveyed by the party program. The Progress Party county leader in Akershus, Per Aage Pleym Christensen, also reconsidered his position, leaving on 4 May.

Oscar Hillgaar left the party on 22 April. The other three libertarian parliamentarians postponed their decision, attending meetings with county leaders on 17 and 22 April. A leading figure in these talks was Henning Holstad from Oslo. Hagen replied that such talks had no grounds in the Progress Party by-laws. The meeting on 22 April went well for the three parliamentarians, but on 30 April the central committee met, and Øystein Hedstrøm put forward a proposal for a "loyalty declaration" to Hagen and the policies agreed to on the national convention. The proposal of a written declaration was not passed, but the central committee decided to demand loyalty. It also removed Lars Erik Grønntun from the executive board (Norwegian: arbeidsutvalg).

The three parliamentarians finally left the party on 3 May. It was speculated that the deputy representatives for Bråthen and Wetterstad, Per Aage Pleym Christensen in Akershus and Geir Thoresen in Buskerud, would follow. Wetterstad drew the lines to Hagen's own withdrawal from the Anders Lange Party to form the short-lived Reform Party. Coincidentally, Hagen celebrated his 50th birthday on 6 May.

=== Youth wing defects ===
With four of ten having resigned from the parliamentary group, the Youth of the Progress Party was the next institution to experience turmoil. In May Verdens Gang announced that a forthcoming extraordinary national convention, spearheaded by Lars Erik Grønntun, would cut its ties with the Progress Party. The county leader in Oslo, Kim M. Høistad, formally proposed such a move. A straightforward dissolution of the Youth of the Progress Party would, however, most likely be followed by an immediate resurrection of the youth wing by Hagen-loyal members. Høistad's proposal was quickly co-signed by the Akershus branch, through its leader Trine Beate Samuelsen, and the Buskerud branch through its leader Per Magne Pedersen. The county chapters in Telemark, Aust-Agder, Vest-Agder, Oppland and Rogaland also voiced support. Hordaland had considered it. National deputy Ole Tom Nomeland was reluctant to comment, but at the national convention he called Ellen Wibe "one of the finest people in Norwegian politics". He was threatened with exclusion in June, ahead of the convention.

Two days before the national convention, the central committee convened and supported a dissolution of the Youth of the Progress Party. Lars Erik Grønntun even announced plans to cooperate more with the Norwegian Young Conservatives and the Young Liberals of Norway. Young Conservatives leader André Støylen was not negative.

The national convention agreed on dissolving the Youth of the Progress Party, with 63 against 21 votes. Hagen-loyal members summoned the Progress Party national board, which overruled the decision, allowing the remaining members to continue with Ulf Leirstein as leader.

=== Other defections ===
Already before the national convention, the entire local party chapter in Osterøy Municipality was disestablished, but mainly due to the European Union controversy. The party had one representative on the municipal council of Osterøy Municipality at the time. One day after the national convention, delegate Kristian Eidesvik announced his withdrawal from the party, though he would sit through his tenure as member of Hordaland county council, which lasted until 1995. Eidesvik was a former member of the central board, and also a former deputy member of Parliament. The same day former MP and youth wing leader Pål Atle Skjervengen withdrew, commenting that the libertarians "are asked by the party leadership to go to hell". Skjervengen had been criticized by Carl I. Hagen from the rostrum at the national convention. Some years down the road Skjervengen joined the Conservative Party. Harald Eide Ellingsen, member of Stavanger city council, also left.

On the municipal council for Røyken Municipality, three of five representatives left the party, and a fourth, former MP Steinar Maribo, considered doing the same. As did Odd Magnar Brubæk, and former deputy MP Paal Bjørnestad. Terje Nyberget withdrew from the central committee in early May. The leader in the chapters in Finnmark and Nordkapp, Bjørn Magne Solvik, withdrew on 13 May. He cited a lack of liberalism, especially with regards to gay rights and immigration, as the reason. He was the only Progress Party member of a municipal council in Finnmark. Maribo withdrew some time in May. In late May, party secretary Hans Andreas Limi had counted 270 withdrawals, but also 76 new members. Municipal and county council member Liv Skrede left after the youth wing's national convention in July, so did Tor Mikkel Wara, Ellen Wibe, Jan Erik Fåne and Petter Bjørheim. Hordaland county council member Lene C. Møgster Løtvedt left and joined the Conservative Party in October.

=== New party ===
Already during the national convention, the Youth of the Progress Party agreed to form an informal "thinking group" for disenfranchised members. Pål Atle Skjervengen was early in declaring an interest in forming a new, libertarian party. Those who resigned from the parliamentary group initially declared a lack of motivation to form a new party, and they also rejected the possibility of joining another party. They would instead vote according to the 1993 party program. Either way, in a parliamentary context they were known as independents for the remainder of their term. They did discuss the possibility of forming a "support group" which would help the four parliamentarians with practical issues. Odd Magnar Brubæk contributed advice on an informal basis from time to time. With some time passed since the Bolkesjø convention, it was decided to hold a formal conference to form a support group in mid-June. Organizations in Akershus and Buskerud already existed, under the names of Fridemokratene Akershus and Buskerud Liberale Forum.

At the conference, the name Free Democrats (Norwegian: Fridemokratene) was adopted, and the band of four were chosen as leaders. Two hundred people joined, and it had four county leaders; Per Aage Pleym Christensen for Akershus, Geir Thoresen for Buskerud, the former city council secretary Roy Venge Tollefsen in Oslo and Thor Simonsen in Østfold. Wibe, on the other hand, left politics, as did Lars Erik Grønntun. The board members of Aust-Agder Youth of the Progress Party joined the Free Democrats in August. Ellen Christine Christiansen stated that "time will tell whether we become a political party". The issue was discussed again at a national convention in September 1994. The Vestfold chapter wanted to field in the 1997 Norwegian parliamentary election with Oscar Hillgaar on the ballot, but this did not happen.

== Results ==
Candidate	Votes	%
Carl I. Hagen	111	71.61
blank votes	44	28.39
Total valid	156	100
Invalid	1	0.64
Total	156	

== See also ==
- Progress Party (Norway)#Turmoil and new schism — a period of turmoil resulted in the Democrats splitting from the Progress Party.
- 1972 Liberal Party national convention — another famous convention, where the Liberal Party split into two.
