= Kristian Norheim =

Norwegian politician

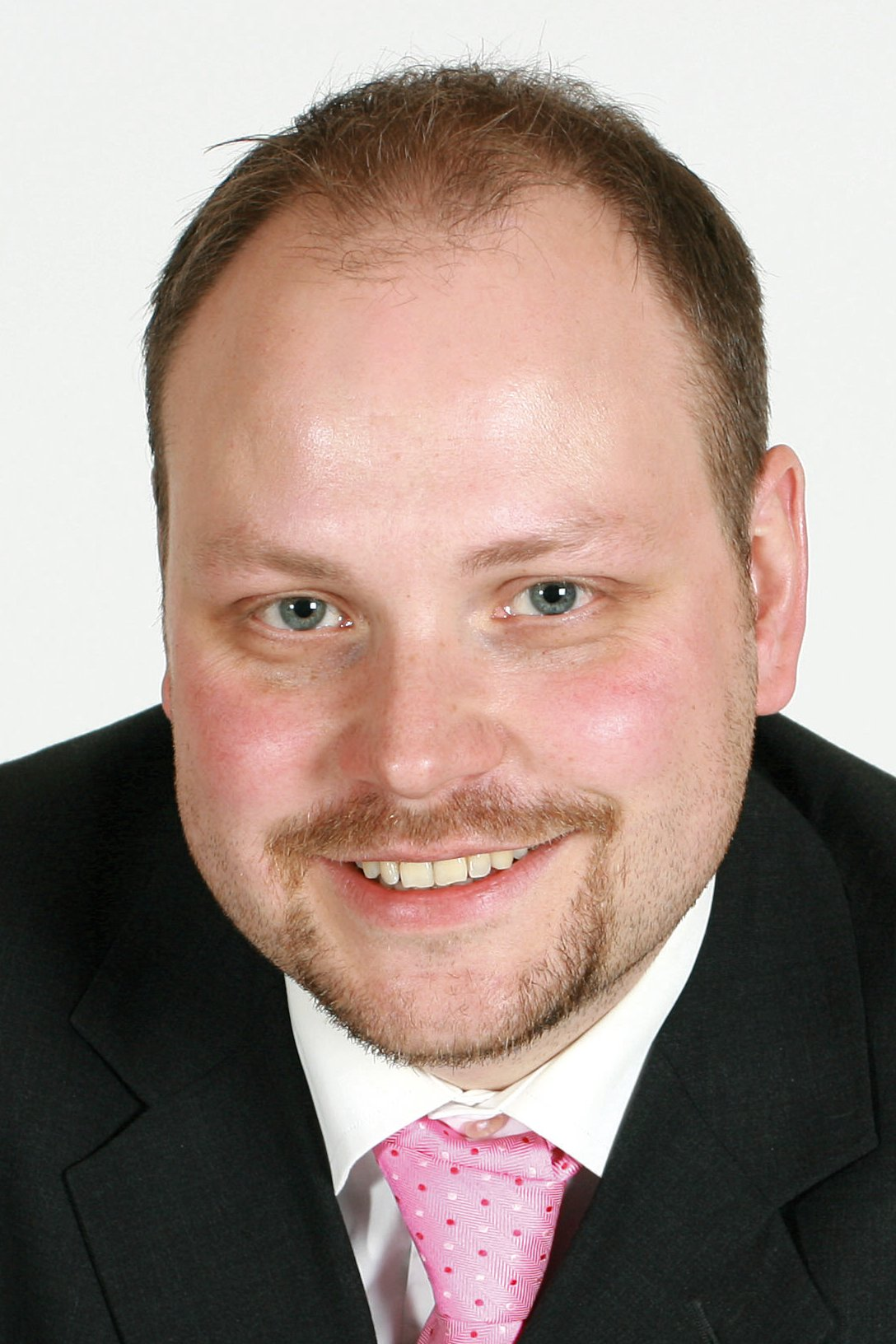
- Born: 19 April 1976 (age 50)
- Political party: Progress Party (until 1994; since 2000s); Free Democrats and Conservative Party (late 1990s)

Kristian Norheim (born 19 April 1976) is a Norwegian politician who has been a member of the Stortinget as an alternate for State Secretary Bård Hoksrud. He is a member of the Progress Party and an expert on international relations.

== Early life and education ==
Norheim was born in Porsgrunn Municipality, Norway. He is the son of Helge Kristian Norheim. He received a Cand. Polit. degree in Political Science from the University of Oslo and an M.A. in Southeast European Studies from the National & Karpostrain University of Athens. He was leader of the Youth of the Progress Party in Telemark from 1993 to 1994, but left the party in 1994 following the 1994 Progress Party national convention and joined the Free Democrats.

== Career ==
From 1995 to 1999, he sat in the municipal council in Siljan Municipality for the Conservative Party. He was the leader of the Free Democrats from 1999 to 2000. He returned to the Progress Party, where he served as an advisor for its parliamentary group. Before the 2013 election Norheim was responsible for international issues as group secretary, and covered this field as advisor to party leader Siv Jensen.

In February 2012 Norheim was unanimously chosen leader of the Progress Party in Telemark.

In the 2013 general election he was elected as first deputy to the Parliament of Norway from Telemark. Since regular representative Bård Hoksrud was named to Erna Solberg's cabinet, Norheim took his seat as a regular representative. He is a member of the Standing Committee on Foreign Affairs and Defence. He serves as second deputy on that committee, as well as on the Storting's delegation for relations with the European Parliament and on its delegation to the Nordic Council. He is a member of the Nordic Council's Citizens' and Consumer Rights Committee. In addition, he is a member of the European Commission.

He took part in the 2010 Balkans seminar in Serbia and Bosnia-Herzegovina, arranged by the Norwegian Institute of International Affairs.

In a 2010 article about the Progress Party, Jay Nordlinger of National Review wrote that Norheim’s office “must be the most politically incorrect room in Scandinavia. There are three posters of Churchill. There’s Reagan, of course: 'Viva the Reagan Revolution!' There’s Barry Goldwater: 'In your heart you know he’s right.' There’s a George Washington doll, and a George W. Bush doll. There’s a picture of the Stealth bomber. There’s a hat from the New York Fire Department. There’s an Israeli flag, a GOP flag (with elephant), a Gadsden flag ('Don’t Tread on Me'). And that’s only a fraction of the inventory.”

Before and after the 2013 elections, Norheim has frequently been identified in the media as the Progress Party's foreign-policy spokesman. He has also been described in English-language media as the party's head of international affairs and as its international secretary.

Norheim has expressed concern over the Progress Party's image abroad, where it is often described as far-right and compared to the French Popular Front and other more radical parties. In September 2013, when the Progress Party held a major press conference for international journalists to dispel any myths about its political orientation. Norheim told a reporter that the purpose of the event is to explain “who we are, and definitely who we are not,” adding that it “was very important we did this because of the distorted picture many foreign media have painted of Progress.” He described the party as “a pragmatic and classical Liberal Party” that is “generally more akin to those such as Denmark’s Liberal Party, Britain’s Conservative Party, the Czech Republic’s Civic Democratic Party (ODF), Iceland’s Independence Party, and the United States’ Republicans.”

== Issues ==
Norheim has referred to the Progress Party as Norway's “new Labor Party.” He argues that the Labor Party has become less a party of workers and more a party of public employees.

=== Alcohol policy ===
Norheim argues for a liberal alcohol policy and has criticized Norway's highly restrictive alcohol policy, writing that “unfortunately there are many who fail to use alcohol with moderation, but there are many more who do, and the system should not be designed for the exceptions... adults should be treated as adults.... Drunkenness is not a result of a liberal alcohol policy, but of an illiberal alcohol policy.”

=== Social democracy ===
At the 2012 national Progress Party convention, Norheim gave a speech in which he criticized the social-democratic welfare state: “Welfare has become one of the leading businesses in this country.” He also complained about the size of the public sector: “Norway is the country in the world with the most public employees.” Norheim's stance is to move away from the welfare state and instead towards a more classically liberal society.

=== Ukultur ===
Norheim has defended the Progress Party's criticism of female genital mutilation, forced marriage, and other examples of “ukultur,” or culturally negative practices.

=== Islam ===
Norheim has expressed concern about antisemitism in Norway and, in particular, about antisemitic statements made by leaders of Norway's largest mosque, and about the inability of the Islamic Council of Norway to respond at once when asked if they support the death penalty for gays.

=== Norway's Christian heritage ===
Norheim has written that “Norway will and should be a secular state” but added that “this does not mean we are also obliged to clear away everything that reminds us of the more than thousand-year-old Christian heritage.”

=== Communism ===
Norheim has condemned the now-defunct Workers' Communist Party (Marxist- Leninist), of which many leading Norwegians were once members, saying that the world that party fought for “was no more fair than the world Quisling and his foreign beacons fought for.”

=== European Union ===
During the 2013 election campaign, Norheim said that “in [his] heart” he supported Norwegian membership in the European Union, but has describes himself as a “non-practicing EU supporter,” owing to his concern about “the growing bureaucracy in Brussels".

=== United States ===
Norheim told Morgenbladet in October 2013 that the Progress Party has a good relationship with the Republican Party in the U.S. and is rhetorically close to its Reaganite wing. He admitted that the then U.S. Ambassador to Norway, Barry White, was correct when he quipped that “all Norwegian parties are Democrats.” In response to the question of whether the Progress Party views the U.S. as a model, Norheim stated that the U.S. is worth examining closely. He expressed admiration for American economist Milton Friedman, for the American free-market ideology, and for the fact that private capital is not viewed negatively in America.

=== Tsunis nomination ===
After businessman George James Tsunis, U.S. President Barack Obama's nominee for Ambassador to Norway, made international headlines with uninformed and incendiary comments about the Progress Party during a Senate committee hearing in January 2014, Norheim said he has "been in dialogue" with the U.S. Embassy about Tsunis's remarks, which he described as problematic.

== Personal life ==
Norheim and Tone Kåsastul Norheim live in Skien and have one son, Henrik Leander, born 24 June 2011.
