= Bråthen =

Bråthen is a surname. Notable people with the surname include:

- Clas Brede Bråthen (born 1968), Norwegian ski jumper
- Erik Mellevold Bråthen (born 1987), Norwegian footballer
- Espen Andersen Bråthen, suspect in the October 2021 "bow and arrow" attacks in Kongsberg, Norway
- Gunnar Bråthen (1896–1980), Norwegian trade unionist and politician
- Stein Bråthen (born 1954), Norwegian cyclist
- Stephen Bråthen (born 1964), Norwegian politician
- Tore Bråthen (born 1954), Norwegian jurist and academic
- Trond Bråthen (1977–2012), Norwegian singer-songwriter, guitarist and bassist
