= Roy Wetterstad =

Norwegian politician

Roy Nettum Wetterstad (born 22 March 1963) is a Norwegian politician formerly representing the Progress Party.

He was born in Kongsberg. He attended commerce school in Kongsberg and Hønefoss from 1979 to 1982, then worked two years for the Youth of the Progress Party, where he also held elected positions. He studied one year at Oppland University College before working two years as a bed and breakfast manager in Kongsberg and Drammen. He then worked six years as party secretary for the Progress Party in Buskerud, from 1987 to 1993. He also entered the Home Guard.

He was a member of Kongsberg municipal council from 1983 to 1988. From 1983 to 1987 and 1991 to 1993 he was a member of Buskerud county council. He chaired the local chapter of the Progress Party for some time, and was a member of the central committee from 1990 to 1991. In 1993 he was elected to the Parliament of Norway, having served as a deputy representative during the term 1989–1993. He served in the Standing Committee on Family, Culture and Administration, and was also the second vice president of the Lagting.

Following the 1994 Progress Party national convention he left the Progress Party. Ahead of the convention he had submitted party-critical resolutions together with Ellen Wibe, Ellen Christine Christiansen, Oscar Hillgaar and Stephen Bråthen. The group had some support, but was a clear minority. At the end of the convention Wetterstad stated in an interview that withdrawing his party membership was out of the question, but he left the party two weeks after the convention, and continued the rest of the term as an independent. He joined the Free Democrats.

From 1997 to 1999 he worked as an information advisor. He then became the secretary-general of the Norwegian Motorsport Federation. He won election to Nedre Eiker municipal council in 1995 for the local list Nedre Eiker frie kommuneliste, and served until 1997. From 1999 to 2003 he was again a member of Kongsberg municipal council's executive committee.
