= Oscar Hillgaar =

Norwegian politician

Oscar Douglas Hillgaar (born 8 November 1945) is a Norwegian politician formerly representing the Progress Party.

He was born in Holt Municipality, Norway, and is of Irish descent. He attended the Norwegian Naval Academy from 1966 to 1967, and served in the Royal Norwegian Navy in Tromsø from 1967 to 1968. He worked as an air traffic controller assistant at Lakselv Airport, Banak from 1968 to 1969, then took air traffic controller education from 1969 to 1971. After completing his education he worked at Bodø, Bardufoss, Karmøy and Fornebu until 1989.

Hillgaar entered politics to fight for traffic safety in his own neighborhood. He was a member of the municipal council of Sandefjord Municipality from 1983 to 1995, serving as deputy mayor from 1987 to 1989. From 1983 to 1987 he was also a member of Vestfold county council. He chaired the local chapter of the Progress Party from 1982 to 1990. He was elected to the Parliament of Norway from Vestfold in 1989, and was re-elected in 1993. He served the first term in the Standing Committee on Agriculture, and the second term in the Standing Committee on Energy and the Environment.

Following the 1994 Progress Party national convention he left the Progress Party. Ahead of the convention he had submitted party-critical resolutions together with Ellen Wibe, Ellen Christine Christiansen, Stephen Bråthen and Roy Wetterstad. The group had some support, but was a clear minority. During the convention, Hillgaar publicly lamented the "Moscow processes" of the convention, and also the views on women and the "extreme xenophobia" which he felt was conveyed by the party program. He left the party a week after the convention. He continued the rest of the term as an independent. There were talks about him fielding in the 1997 election for the Free Democrats, but this did not happen.

From 1997 to 2005 he worked as a supervisor at the Oslo Air Traffic Control Center. From 1998 to 2000 he was also a secretary for the trade union Norwegian Air Traffic Controllers' Association. From 1999 to 2002 he was the deputy chair of the Norwegian Labour Party in Sandefjord. From 2003 to 2007 he served a fourth term in Sandefjord's municipal council. Already in 1994 he had stated that were it not for the circumstances in Sandefjord politics, he might as well have joined the Labour Party—or the Conservative Party—already in the 1980s.
