= Sveum =

Sveum is a surname of Norwegian origin. Notable people with the surname include:

- Bente Øyan Sveum (born 1945), Norwegian politician
- Dale Sveum (born 1963), American baseball player, coach, and manager
- Dennis Sveum (figure skater), American ice dancer
- Dennis Sveum (ice hockey) (born 1986), Norwegian ice hockey player
