= Geir Thoresen =

Norwegian politician (born 1965)

Geir Thoresen (born 11 August 1965) is a Norwegian politician formerly representing the Progress Party.

He served as a deputy representative to the Parliament of Norway from Buskerud during the term 1993–1997. In total he met during 99 days of parliamentary session.

Following the 1994 Progress Party national convention he left the Progress Party. Ahead of the convention he had submitted party-critical resolutions together with libertarian-leaning members. He left the party some time after the convention, and became leader of the county branch of the Free Democrats in Buskerud.
