= Marius Reikerås =

Norwegian former lawyer (born 1972)

Marius Reikerås (born 19 June 1972) is a Norwegian former lawyer.

Reikerås was central in the court case where former North Sea divers demanded compensation from the state for health injuries they felt they had suffered during diving on offshore installations in the North Sea.

After losing the case of the North Sea divers in Oslo District Court in 2008, the focus turned to Reikerås itself. He had wrongly received 2 million Norwegian kroner from his former client Egil Anfindsen, an owner of a shipping company based in Bergen, Norway, who he had represented since 2003. One million Norwegian kroner was paid back in 2007 when the client's family became aware of these transactions, but they claimed there was still money missing. Police investigation resulted in a trial in which Reikerås was convicted in April 2009 to repay 1.3 million Norwegian kroner and legal costs to his former client. A month later, news came that the Norwegian Bar Association would revoke Reikerås’ lawyer's license. In 2010, Reikerås filed for bankruptcy after he had not managed to repay the money he had wrongly received from his former client. In 2011, Reikerås was sentenced to five months in prison for threatening fellow lawyer Helge Wesenberg, who had been hired by Reikerås’ former client's family.

Lawyer Per Danielsen took over the case of the North Sea divers when Reikerås lost his license to practice law. This proved to be demanding as Reikerås refused to hand over the case documents. Later, Reikerås filed a lawsuit against Danielsen and his insurance company because Danielsen had filed a claim in Reikerås' bankruptcy estate. In 2015, the lawsuit was dismissed in Oslo District Court, and Reikerås was sentenced to half a million kroner in legal costs. The judgment was appealed, but Reikerås did not achieve anything in the Court of Appeal except that the costs of the case he had to cover for the counterpart were reduced to 322.500 Norwegian kroner.

In 2014, Fremskrittspartiet (Progress Party) politician and parliamentary representative Ulf Leirstein established a working group that would give him input in relation to possible breaches of the rule of law within the government. Marius Reikerås was appointed to head this group. When TV 2 confronted Leirstein with the suggestion that there were close ties between the group's members and conspiracy theorist environments, Leirstein chose to close down the group immediately. Reikerås has also written articles for the conspiracy theory websites Nyhetsspeilet and Riksavisen.

In 2016, Reikerås was convicted of having worked as a lawyer without a license, and received a fine of 25.000 Norwegian kroner. The verdict was appealed and in 2017 repealed by Gulating Court of Appeals. The case was brought up again in Bergen District Court in 2018, where Reikerås was convicted of having offered legal services without a license, and received a fine of 25.000 Norwegian kroner.

In recent years, Reikerås has focused on fighting the Norwegian Child Welfare Services on behalf of parents who are deprived of the right of care for their children.
