= Himanshu Gulati =

Norwegian politician

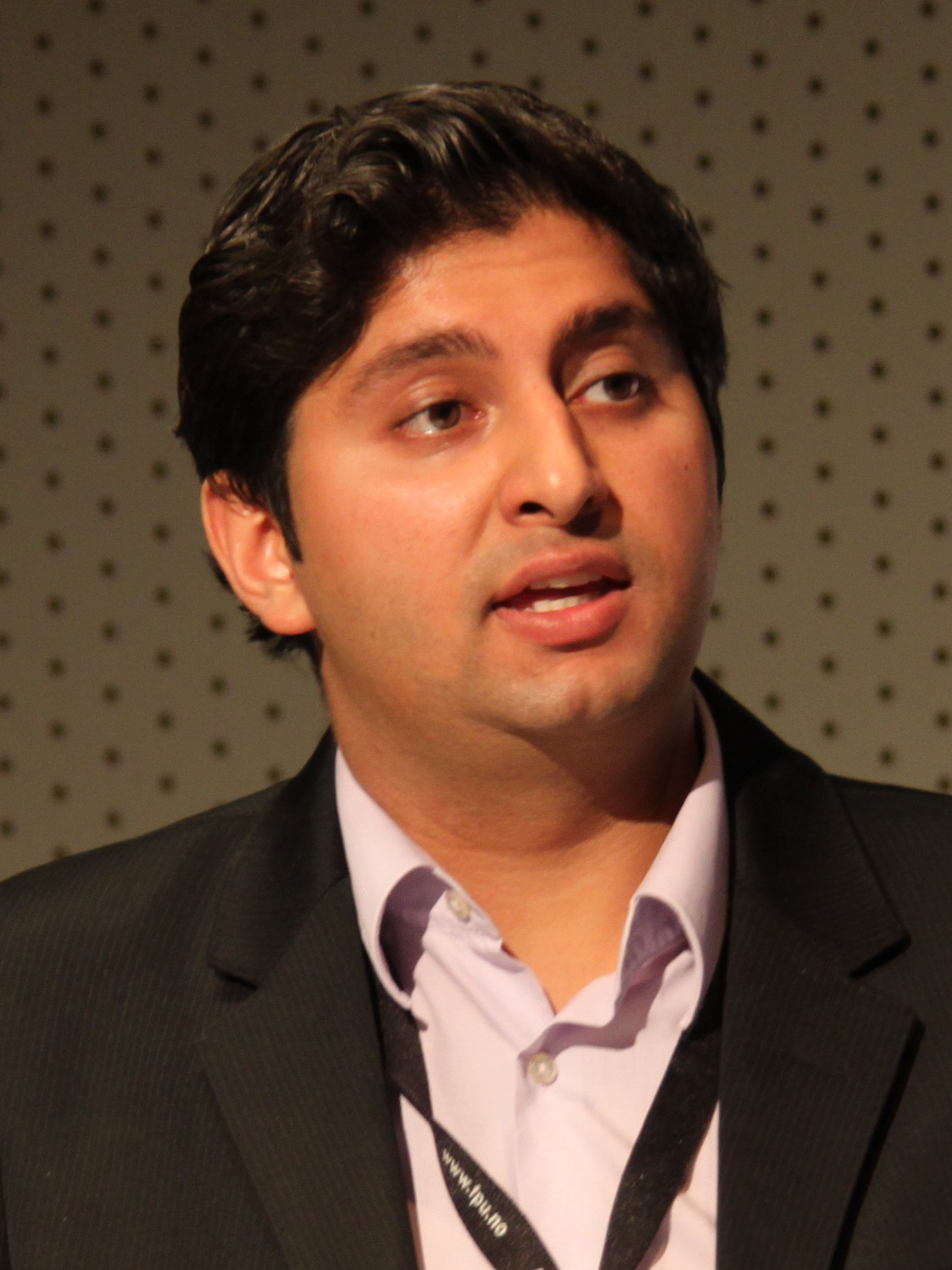
- Gulati in 2012

Member of the Norwegian Parliament
- Incumbent
- Assumed office 1 October 2017
- Constituency: Akershus

Personal details
- Born: 16 June 1988 (age 38) Førde, Norway
- Party: Progress
- Education: BI Norwegian Business School

Himanshu Gulati (born 16 June 1988) is a Norwegian politician of Indian descent representing the Progress Party. He chaired the Progress Party's Youth from 2012 to 2014 and served as State Secretary in the Ministry of Justice and Public Security (2013–2014) and at the Office of the Prime Minister (2014–2017). Since 2017, Gulati has been a member of the Storting representing Akershus, serving on the Committee on Justice.

== Early life and education ==
Gulati was born in Førde Municipality, Norway, to Indian parents who immigrated from New Delhi in the 1970s. His father is a physician and his mother a physiotherapist. He spent his early years in the rural village of Lavik in Høyanger Municipality, where his father worked as a general practitioner, before moving to Lillestrøm in Akershus, at age 14.

Initially pursuing medicine, Gulati later shifted to business studies, earning a bachelor's degree in Business Administration and Leadership from BI Norwegian Business School. He also completed a six-month filmmaking course at an academy in India.

== Political career ==
Gulati joined the Progress Party's Youth (FpU) at age 15. He served as vice-chairperson for two years before being elected chairperson on 24 March 2012. He has also served as a deputy member of the Storting.

At the local level, Gulati has represented FrP on the municipal council for Skedsmo Municipality since 2007. He has been vocal on foreign policy, immigration, and taxation, often criticizing the Red-green coalition.

In October 2013, after the parliamentary election, he was appointed State Secretary to Anders Anundsen in the Ministry of Justice and Public Security, becoming the youngest state secretary in Solberg’s Cabinet at age 25.

Re-elected to Parliament in 2021, Gulati became chair of the pro-Israel caucus Friends of Israel in the Parliament of Norway. He has visited Israel over twenty times, describing it as an "inspiration".

== Awards and achievements ==
Year	Country of residence	Award name	Given by	Field of Merit
2019	Norway	Pravasi Bharatiya Samman	President of India	Public Service

Party political offices
Preceded by Ove Vanebo	Leader of the Progress Party's Youth; 2012–2014	Succeeded by Atle Simonsen
