= Pål Atle Skjervengen =

Norwegian politician

Pål Atle Skjervengen (born 6 October 1960) is a retired Norwegian politician.

He was born in Oslo as a son of a police inspector. He finished secondary education in 1979, and briefly studied law, then business administration at the Norwegian School of Management. From 1982 to 1984 he worked in the party newspaper Fremskritt from 1982 to 1984, returning as editor from 1987 to 1993. From 1984 to 1986 he was a political secretary.

He was a member of Oslo's school board from 1979 to 1983. He was a deputy member of Oslo city council from 1979 to 1983 and an executive committee member between 1983 and 1989. From 1984 to 1987 he was the chairman of the Youth of the Progress Party, having been secretary-general from 1981 to 1982. He was then deputy chair of the Progress Party from 1987 to 1991. He served as a deputy representative to the Parliament of Norway for the Progress Party from Oslo during the term 1985–1989, and was elected in 1989.

After finishing his term in 1993 he quit active politics. He remained in the Progress Party for a year, but after the 1994 Progress Party national convention he withdrew, commenting that the libertarians in the organization had been "asked by the party leadership to go to hell". Skjervengen had been criticized by Carl I. Hagen from the rostrum at the national convention. Skjervengen stated that he did not like any political party in Norway at the present, but that he liked the Danish Liberal Party. He would rather start a new party. Many years later he joined the Conservative Party.

Skjervengen has also been a board member for the European Movement in Norway from 1992 to 1993 the Helsinki Committee for Human Rights in Norway from 1995 to 1997, Global Money Games from 1999 to 2000 and Oslo Port Authority from 2003. He has spent his professional career in Konsensus Kommunikasjon (1993–1996, 2001–2003), as CEO of VinCompagniet from 1996 to 2001 and CEO of Fondberg from 2003.

Party political offices
Preceded by Peter N. Myhre	Chairman of the Youth of the Progress Party; 1984–1987	Succeeded by Tor Mikkel Wara
