= Jan Simonsen =

Norwegian politician (1953–2019)

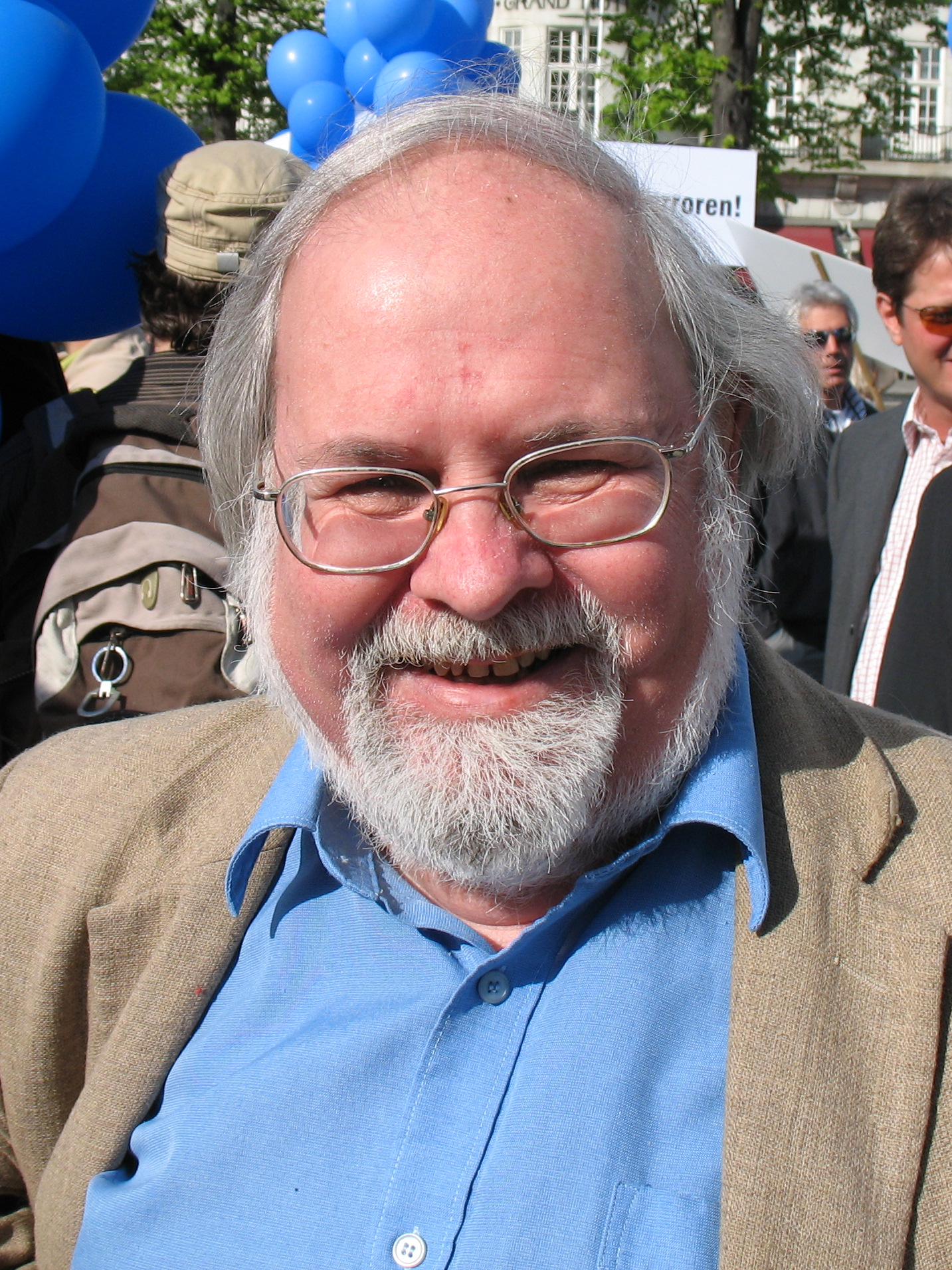
- Simonsen in 2006

Member of Parliament for Rogaland
- In office 11 September 1989 – 12 September 2005

Personal details
- Born: 3 March 1953 Stavanger, Norway
- Died: 12 August 2019 (aged 66)
- Party: Progress Party (1975–2001); Democrats (2002–2007)
- Website: Blog (Frie Ytringer)

Jan Simonsen (3 March 1953 – 12 August 2019) was a Norwegian politician, writer and journalist. He was a member of parliament from 1989 to 2005, and a member of the Progress Party until he was expelled from the party in 2001. He was the deputy leader of the Democrats party from 2003 to 2004. Since his parliamentary term ended, he largely withdrew from party politics to focus on his writing and journalism. He was a staunch supporter of Israel, and wrote the blog Frie Ytringer which focused on the Islamisation of Europe.

== Early and personal life ==
Simonsen was born in Stavanger to businesspersons Viktor Holck Simonsen (1913–90) and Martha Espevoll (1917–91). He was born and raised in the city district Våland, and later lived a few years in Eiganes. He studied social science at Rogaland University College and has a minor in history. He was editor for the publications Strandbuen, Video- og TV-guiden and the official Progress Party publication Fremskritt. He was not married.

He was baptised in the Church of Norway, and as an adult remained a strong supporter of the church, but left it during the term of Gunnar Stålsett as bishop of Oslo. This was as Stålsett had been the chairman of the Centre Party in the 1970s, and got his bid for bishop supported by Centre Party MPs in 1998, with Simonsen thinking the choice to have been too politicised. When Stålsett stepped down in 2005, and was succeeded by Ole Christian Kvarme, Simonsen however rejoined the church.

In 2004 Simonsen was a competitor on the reality television show Robinson VIP, a Scandinavian adaptation and celebrity edition of Survivor that aired in 2005, finishing as runner-up.

== Political career ==
Simonsen was during the 1970s active in the nonpartisan youth organisation Moderate Youth, and was the chairman of its Rogaland chapter from 1975 to 1977. He joined Anders Lange's Party in 1975, which was renamed the Progress Party in 1977, citing a great admiration of the party founder Anders Lange (who though had died in 1974). Simonsen held numerous positions within the party, including chairman of the Rogaland chapter of the Progress Party's Youth from 1978 to 1981 and vice chairman of the Progress Party itself from 1991 to 1993. From 1989 to 2005 he was a member of parliament.

On 19 October 2001, the Progress Party expelled Simonsen from the party after 25 years as a member. The same day, the party's secretary general Geir Mo made the statement to the Norwegian news agency NTB that "the Progress Party has, after a complete evaluation, decided that it is best for both parties to leave each other". Prior to the expulsion, Simonsen had faced scrutiny due to a Rikets tilstand documentary on TV 2, alleging that he had used his position as representative to help a friend obtain a liquor license. Simonsen however hold that party chairman Carl I. Hagen misused his position to expel him together with other high-ranking members in 2001 for rather non-existent reasons. He has since had a poor relationship with both Carl I. Hagen and his wife Eli Hagen, though he remained largely on good terms with Progress Party politicians in general, including future leader Siv Jensen.

Since then, Simonsen sat as an independent member of parliament until 2005. From 2003 to 2004, he was vice chairman of the Democrats, a party founded in 2002 largely by other Progress Party members who had been expelled around the same time as Simonsen. He withdrew from the Democrats as a member in 2007. While he was not a member of the Democrats, he however ran as the top candidate for the party in Akershus for the 2009 parliamentary election.

== Political views ==
Simonsen was a staunch supporter of Israel and its right to defend itself against terrorism, citing that he as a teenager had read much about the Second World War and the Holocaust, which coincidented with the breakout of the Six-Day War. He however assert that he had friends both on the Israeli and Palestinian side of the conflict. In 2003, he congratulated Israel for the assassination of Ahmed Yassin and Russia for the liquidation of Aslan Maskhadov in 2005. Before the 2009 election, he said that his most important issues was to "fight for our basic democratic, liberal and human society values against external pressure, mainly from Islamic societies".

== Bibliography ==
Simonsen is the author of several books.

- Ikke helt A-4, 2004 (biography)
- Guttene fra Yorkstrasse, 2005 (novel)
- Døden på Stortinget, 2007 (crime novel)
- Høyresidens frihetsaktivister, 2009 (nonfiction)
