= Ellen Christine Christiansen =

Norwegian politician (born 1964)

Ellen Christine Christiansen (born 10 December 1964) is a Norwegian politician representing the Conservative Party and formerly the Progress Party.

Born in Oslo, she finished her secondary education at Oslo Commerce School in 1983. She thereupon studied economics for two years, before starting her studies at the University of Oslo. From 1992 to 1993, she worked as a secretary for the European Movement in Norway.

She was a member of the borough council of Bislett–Ullevål from 1983 to 1987 and of the executive committee of Oslo city council from 1987 to 1990. She was appointed as City Commissioner of the Boroughs from 1990 to 1991, when she reverted to being a council member. She sat until 1995. From 1990 to 1994 she was also a member of the Progress Party's central board. In 1993 she was elected to the Parliament of Norway from Oslo. She served in the Standing Committee on Education, Research and Church Affairs.

Following the 1994 Progress Party national convention she left the Progress Party. Ahead of the convention she had submitted party-critical resolutions together with Ellen Wibe, Roy Wetterstad, Oscar Hillgaar and Stephen Bråthen. The group had some support, but was a clear minority. Christiansen left her post in the central board already during the convention, and she left the party two weeks after the convention. She continued the rest of the term as an independent, but was a founding member of the new political organization Free Democrats. She chaired this organization from 1994 to 1996.

Christiansen later joined the Conservative Party, which she represented as City Commissioner of Healthcare from 2000 to 2002. In 2003 she became leader of the borough chapter of Frogner. Between her parliamentary spell and her second period as City Commissioner, she had a civic job as information director in TV3. From 2004 she has worked in the Norwegian Labour and Welfare Service as county director. She was also deputy chair of Oslo Energi Holding from 1997 to 2000 and Sunnaas Hospital from 1999 to 2000, and board member of Hafslund from 2003 to 2007 and Ullevål University Hospital from 2006.

Political offices
Preceded by Fritz Huitfeldt	Oslo City Commissioner of the Boroughs; 1990–1991	Succeeded by position abolished
Preceded by Erling Lae	Oslo City Commissioner of Healthcare; 2000–2002	Succeeded by position abolished
