= Ove Vanebo =

Norwegian politician

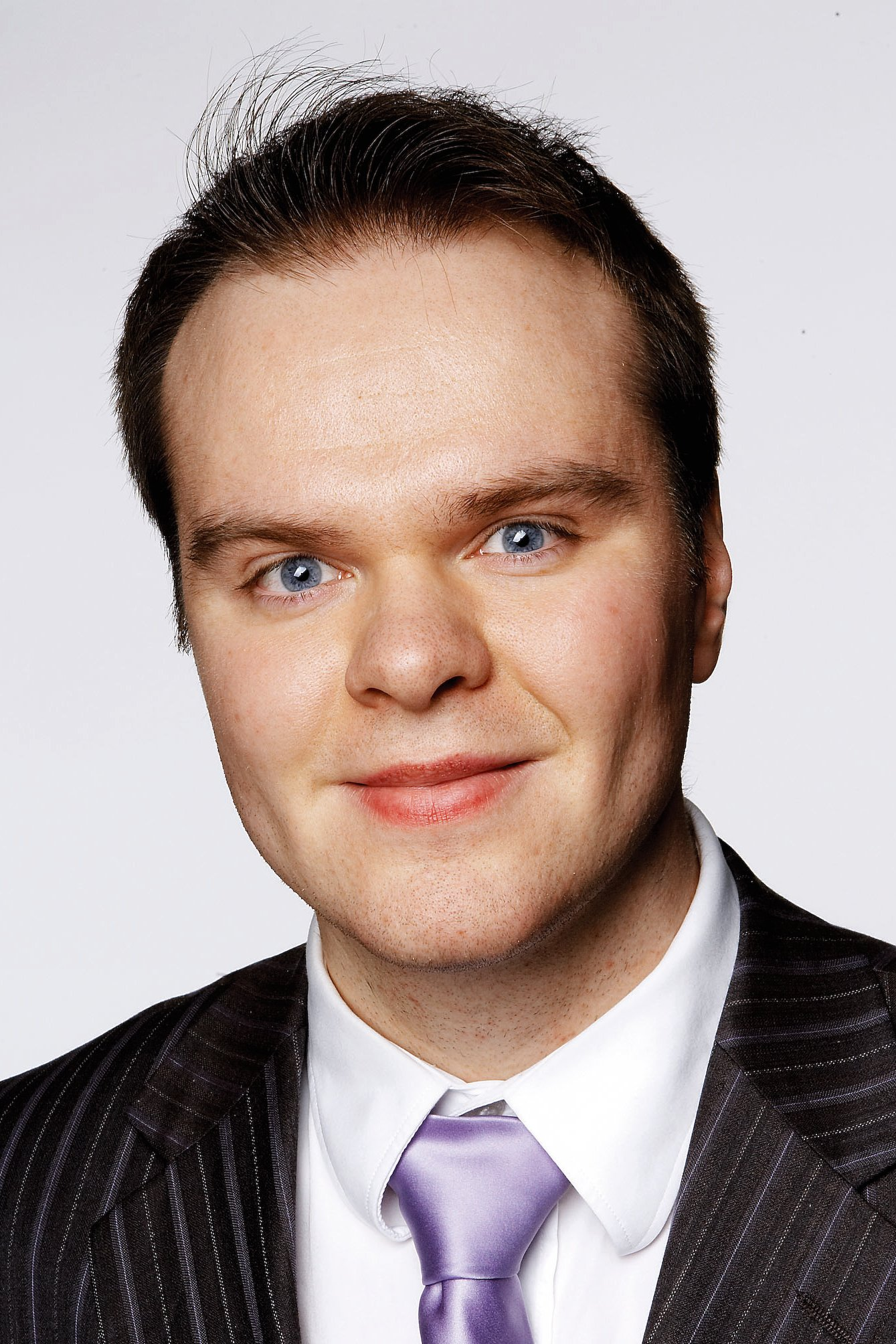

Personal details
- Born: 2 May 1983 (age 43) Hokksund, Norway
- Party: Progress Party
- Education: University of Oslo
- Occupation: Politician, Lawyer

Ove André Vanebo (born 2 May 1983) is a Norwegian politician for the Progress Party.

From 2008 to 2012 he was the chairman of the Youth of the Progress Party, the youth wing of the Progress Party.

He served as a deputy representative to the Norwegian Parliament from Buskerud during the term 2005–2009. On the local level Vanebo is a member of Øvre Eiker municipality council and Buskerud county council since 2003.

Party political offices
Preceded by Trond Birkedal	Leader of the Progress Party's Youth; 2008–2012	Succeeded by Himanshu Gulati
