= Trond Birkedal =

Norwegian politician

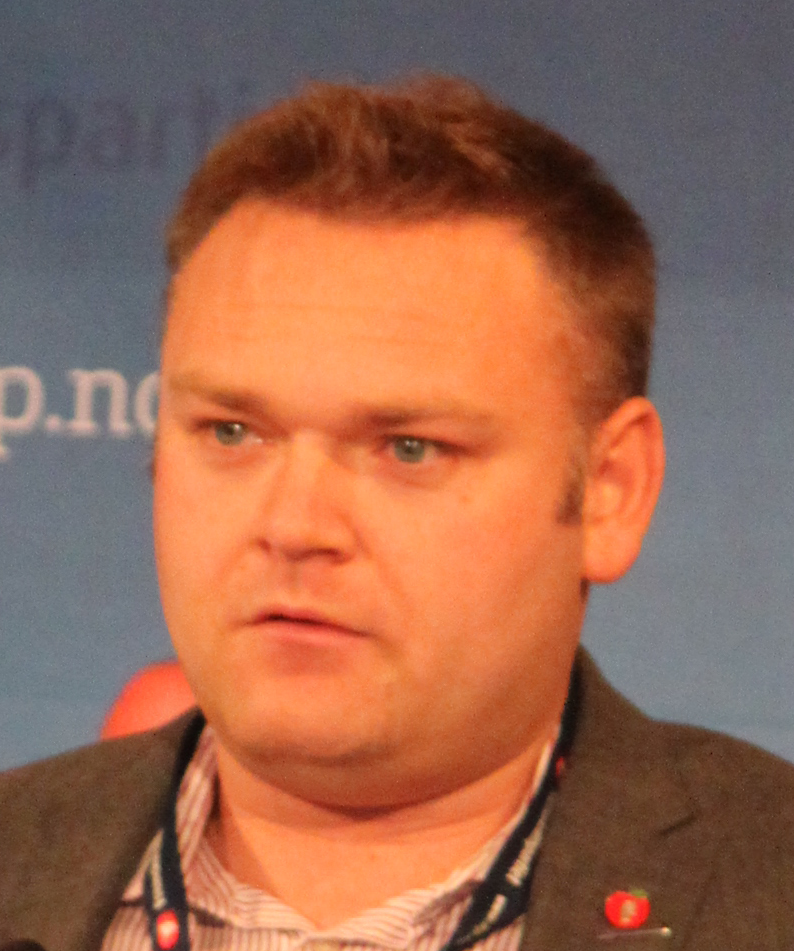
- Birkedal in 2010
- Born: 22 March 1980 (age 46); Stavanger, Norway
- Years active: 1996–2011
- Political party: Progress Party

Trond Birkedal (born 22 March 1980) is a former Norwegian Progress Party politician who occupied a number of senior posts in his party, including as chairman of the Youth of the Progress Party and member of Progress Party's central executive committee and national board.

Locally, he was elected as a member of the Stavanger city council and Rogaland county council. In addition, he ran for Mayor in the 2011 local elections. He resigned from politics following his indictment and subsequent conviction for child sexual abuse.

== Conviction for child sexual abuse ==
In 2011, Birkedal was charged with having sex with a minor and sexual misconduct. He was also suspected of sexual offences against 13 boys. Subsequently, Birkedal resigned from all political offices, effectively ending his political career.

In February 2012, the city court acquitted him on the most serious charges involving sex with a minor, while he was convicted on lesser charges involving secret filming and inappropriate internet conduct, to which he pleaded guilty. He was sentenced to 60 days in prison, of which 40 days were suspended. The non-suspended part of the sentence had already been served in custody.

The verdict was appealed by the public prosecutor. On 17 October 2012, Birkedal was found guilty of sex with a minor and sentenced to 7 months in prison. He was fined to pay the victim 60,000 NOK in compensation by Gulating Court of Appeal. On 12 December 2012, the Supreme Court rejected his appeal of the conviction, and his conviction for sex with a minor is thus final. But, the court agreed to hear the sentencing. The Supreme Court rejected his appeal of the sentencing on 7 February 2013; both the conviction and the sentence are now final.

Preceded by Bård Hoksrud	Chairman of the Youth of the Progress Party; 2002–2008	Succeeded by Ove Vanebo
