= Bård Hoksrud =

Norwegian politician

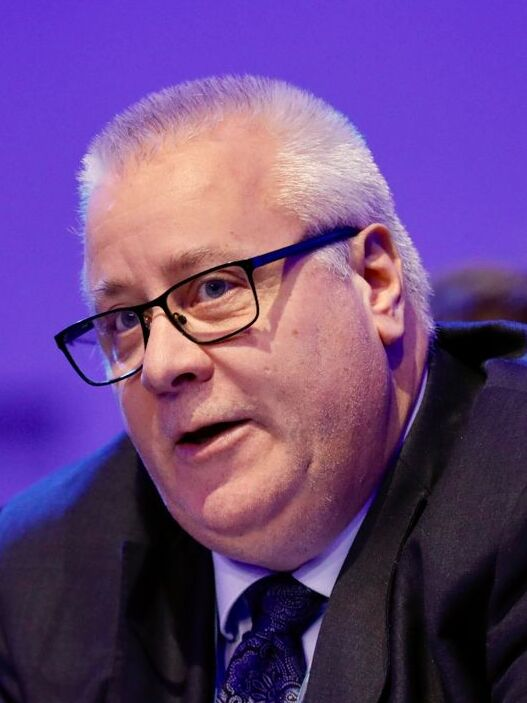
- Hoksrud in 2024

Minister of Agriculture and Food
- In office 31 August 2018 – 22 January 2019
- Prime Minister: Erna Solberg
- Preceded by: Jon Georg Dale
- Succeeded by: Olaug Bollestad

State Secretary at the Ministry of Transport and Communications
- In office 16 October 2013 – 5 June 2015
- Prime Minister: Erna Solberg
- Minister: Ketil Solvik-Olsen

Member of the Norwegian Parliament
- Incumbent
- Assumed office 5 October 2005
- Deputy: Kristian Norheim (2013–2015); Stine Margrethe Knutsdatter Olsen (2018–2019)
- Constituency: Telemark

Personal details
- Born: 26 March 1973 (age 53) Porsgrunn, Telemark, Norway
- Party: Progress
- Spouse: Ingunn Lundin Jensen
- Children: 2
- Occupation: Politician
- Profession: Grocery store manager

Bård André Hoksrud (born 26 March 1973 in Porsgrunn) is a Norwegian politician for the Progress Party. Since 2005, he has been a member of the Storting. He served as Minister of Agriculture and Food from 2018 to 2019, and as State Secretary at the Ministry of Transport and Communications from 2013 to 2015.

From 1999 to 2002, he was the chairman of the Youth of the Progress Party. He was elected to the Parliament of Norway from Telemark in 2005. He had previously served in the position of deputy representative during the terms 1997–2001 and 2001–2005. On the local level, Hoksrud was a member of the municipal council of Bamble Municipality from 1991 to 2007. He does not have higher education, but worked as a grocery store manager before entering politics.

== Early life and education ==
He was born 26 March 1973 in Porsgrunn to father, electrician Rolf Oddbjørn Hoksrud (1944-) and mother Karin Gulbrandsen (1947-). Hoksrud finished Vallermyrene Upper Secondary school in 1992. He later managed a series of grocery stores up until 1998.

== Political career ==
=== Early career ===
Active in the Progress Party's Youth (FPU) since 1989, he was the leader of its Telemark branch as well as central board member from 1996, before becoming its overall leader from 1999 to 2002. Hoksrud, who originally was third in line for the leadership, was elected after Robert Eriksson and Fredrik Färber declined the post. He was also employed as a political aide to the Progress Party parliamentary caucus, as well as serving as an organizational secretary for the party.

=== Local politics ===
Hoksrud started his career at age 18 as an elected politician as a member of the municipal council from Bamble Municipality from 1991 to 2011. Locally he was also a board member of Skiensfjordens Kommunale Kraftselskap from 1999 to 2000 and national board member of the Norwegian Association of Local and Regional Authorities from 2000 to 2005.

=== Parliament ===
He served as a deputy representative to the Parliament of Norway during the terms 1997–2001 and 2001–2005, and was elected as a full member in the 2005 parliamentary election. During his first term he sat on the Standing Committee on Transport and Communications, and after he was reelected in the 2009 parliamentary election he became the committees deputy leader.

Hoksrud is one of Norway's most active members of parliament. According to the daily newspaper Aftenposten, Hoksrud was, along with fellow Progress Party politicians Ketil Solvik-Olsen and Torgeir Trældal, the politicians who submitted most formal questions to the Cabinet ministers during parliamentary sessions.

Hoksrud was again re-elected in 2013. When Solberg's Cabinet assumed office following that election, Hoksrud was appointed as a State Secretary in the Ministry of Transport and Communications under Ketil Solvik-Olsen. His parliamentary seat was taken by deputy Kristian Norheim. He held the position until 2015, and resumed his duties in Parliament.

=== Party politics ===
Following Ketil Solvik-Olsen's announcement that he would step down as deputy leader at the party convention in April 2023; Hoksrud announced his candidacy to succeed him. On 20 March, Hoksrud withdrew his candidacy and endorsed Hans Andreas Limi.

=== Minister of Agriculture and Food ===
Hoksrud was appointed minister of agriculture and food on 31 August 2018 in a minor reshuffle following Ketil Solvik-Olsen's resignation. He succeeded Jon Georg Dale, who had been appointed as Solvik-Olsen's successor.

In October, Hoksrud reiterated in a Storting question time that he experienced that agriculture is leaning forward. He specified that the amount of farms reducing have been halted and that the government saw positivity in the industry. Hoksrud was dismissive to the dry summer that had occurred, and reiterated that the government had taken good measures for agriculture.

In November, Hoksrud lead the jury in Lillestrøm to hand out the annual Young Farmer award to 29 year old Olav Høyheim Einan. Hoksrud said: "This year's winner satisfies all the criteria in the competition. He has a strong focus on sustainable production and operation and has made an enormous effort to expand the farm using local resources in an impressive way".

Following complaints of poor food in care homes, Hoksrud announced in December that a Food Pleasure Corps would be set up "to help make food and meals in institutions the highlight of the day". For the last prior weeks, he and Minister of the Elderly and Public Health Åse Michaelsen were invited to six "inspiration day" events in all parts of the country about food pleasure and elderly health.

In January 2019, Hoksrud handed out the Business Development Award in Agriculture to Ask gård foredling AS. He further commented that he felt impressed and "it is awesome to participate in handing out such an award".

On 22 January, after the Christian Democrats joined the government, Hoksrud was succeeded by Olaug Bollestad.

== Views ==
An outspoken opponent of Toll roads in Norway, Hoksrud frequently accused the Red-green coalition government of "highway robbery", when charging drivers in order to finance future road projects. While he supports a massive increase in road- and railway spending and construction, he believes this should be financed through the state budget. He once referred to the Minister of Transport Magnhild Meltveit Kleppa as a "modern day highwayman, due to her support for toll roads. He has been criticized for allegedly disregarding cases where the Progress Party itself votes in favour of toll roads on the municipal level.

Generally opposed to taxes and restrictions on automobiles, Hoksrud accused prime minister Jens Stoltenberg of having a "hidden agenda" when the latter proposed a ban on diesel cars during specific days, in order to reduce pollution of CO_{2} and NO_{x} gases, as well as extra taxation for diesel-run cars. This was because the government had advised people to buy diesel-run cars earlier before the health hazards were known. Hoksrud called the plans "hopeless" and polls made indicated that only 40% of drivers would respect the ban.

== The "Hoksrud affair" ==
On 21 September 2011, media outlet TV 2 reported that Hoksrud had visited a brothel in Riga, the capital of Latvia. He subsequently admitted having paid a Latvian prostitute for services. As this is punishable under Norwegian law, the party's then deputy leader, Per Sandberg, said that Hoksrud would resign from his political positions, if the party so wishes. Hoksrud later confirmed this by saying : "I naturally wish that the party be at least possible harm for something extraordinarily stupid I did at my spare-time. I am now aware that the police is to open investigation, and therefore I immediately resign from all of my mandates in the party". As he was popularly elected, he was unable by law to resign from parliament. He did however resign from the party's powerful Central Committee, where he was replaced by Pål Morten Borgli. In the end he received a fine of NOK 25.000 ($4800), which he accepted.

In the aftermath of the case, Hoksrud experienced an outpouring of support on social media, and despite being declared politically dead by veteran political analyst Kyrre Nakkim, was unanimously nominated for reelection towards the 2013 elections. He was subsequently reelected for a third term.

Preceded by Anders Anundsen	Chairman of the Youth of the Progress Party; 1999–2002	Succeeded by Trond Birkedal
