= Simen Velle =

Norwegian politician (born 2000)

- Velle in 2022

Leader of the Progress Party's Youth
- In office 10 April 2022 – 11 April 2026
- First Deputy: Ole Jakob Warbo; Lars Balstad Løvold
- Second Deputy: Claudia Brännström; Sebastian Saltrø Ytrevik
- Preceded by: Andreas Brännström
- Succeeded by: Lars Balstad Løvold

Member of the Storting
- Incumbent
- Assumed office 1 October 2025
- Constituency: Oslo

Personal details
- Born: 22 November 2000 (age 25) Asker Municipality, Akershus, Norway
- Party: Progress (since 2017)

Simen Velle (born 22 November 2000) is a Norwegian politician who served as leader of the Progress Party's Youth from 2022 to 2026 and a member of the Storting for Oslo since 2025. From 2021 to 2022, he served as chairman of the Progress Party's Youth in Viken.

== Early life ==
Velle grew up in the suburb of Drengsrud in Asker Municipality, the oldest of two children. His parents separated when he was fifteen and shortly afterwards his father was diagnosed with Huntington's disease. He struggled with substance abuse until the age of nineteen and was apprehended by the police on two occasions. Velle describes his substance abuse as being a sort of self-medication for him at the time. He further detailed this in an interview in April 2024, explaining also that he and two friends were arrested for possession of a total of 100 grams of cannabis.

== Political career ==
=== Youth politics ===
Velle served as the leader of the Viken Progress Party's Youth from 2021 to 2022 and was elected leader of the national Progress Party's Youth in April 2022. He was re-elected in 2024. He built up a large social media following during his leadership, which became particularly prevalent during the 2023 school elections, where his party became the second largest. Two years later, his party became the largest party at that year's school elections.

He caused some controversy in February 2024 when he criticised dating and sex culture, calling it "tinderfied" and went on to argue that "some groups of men have access to all the girls while the rest don't get any". He also argued that equality had gone too far, citing that women had been lifted, which had gone at the expense of men. Though he went on to apologise for this claim, some critics accused him of arguing that female equality had stripped men of the chance of "getting laid".

During his leadership, he had challenged and contradicted the national party on several key issues, including the legalisation of cannabis, sale of organs and polygamy. He would however reverse course on legalisation of cannabis and opened for giving the police more equipment to combat the issue.

Velle stepped down as leader at the youth party's convention in April 2026 and was succeeded by his deputy, Lars Balstad Løvold.

=== Parliament ===
He was elected as a regular representative for Oslo at the 2025 election. He was also appointed as his party's spokesperson on education.

== Personal life ==
Velle confirmed in November 2026 that he was in a relationship.

== Bibliography ==
- Velle, Simen (2025). 11 gode grunner til å våkne opp. Oslo, Norway: Aschehoug. ISBN 9788203455575.
