= Stephen Bråthen =

Norwegian politician (born 1964)

Stephen Bråthen (born 2 September 1964) is a Norwegian politician formerly representing the Progress Party.

He was born in Lørenskog. He took a basic education in economics before enrolling in the Norwegian Armed Forces. He served in the United Nations Interim Force in Lebanon from 1985 to 1986. From 1986 to 1989 he worked in the bank Den norske Creditbank, and from 1989 to 1993 he worked as an advisor for the Progress Party parliamentary group.

He was a member of Ski municipal council from 1983 to 1987, then served as a deputy member for one period before entering the executive committee in 1991. He chaired the local chapter of the Progress Party from 1986 to 1989, and was a member of the national board from 1993 to 1994. In 1993 he won the second spot on the Progress Party nomination for the parliamentary election. Libertarian-leaning, incumbent MP Jan Erik Fåne was offered the second spot, but rejected any spot but the first, and pulled out. Bråthen was elected, and served in the Standing Committee on Finance.

Following the 1994 Progress Party national convention he left the Progress Party. Ahead of the convention he had submitted party-critical resolutions together with Ellen Wibe, Ellen Christine Christiansen, Oscar Hillgaar and Roy Wetterstad. The group had some support, but was a clear minority. He left the party two weeks after the convention, and continued the rest of the term as an independent. There were talks of the Progress Party demanding to take over his seat in the prestigious Standing Committee on Finance, but this did not happen.

From 1997 he has worked as information director for the Norwegian Institute of Public Accountants, except for the period 1998 to 1999 when he was managing director. He was also a lay judge in Indre Follo District Court from 1991 to 1993 and a board member of Sunnaas Hospital from 2000.
