= Mette Hanekamhaug =

Norwegian politician

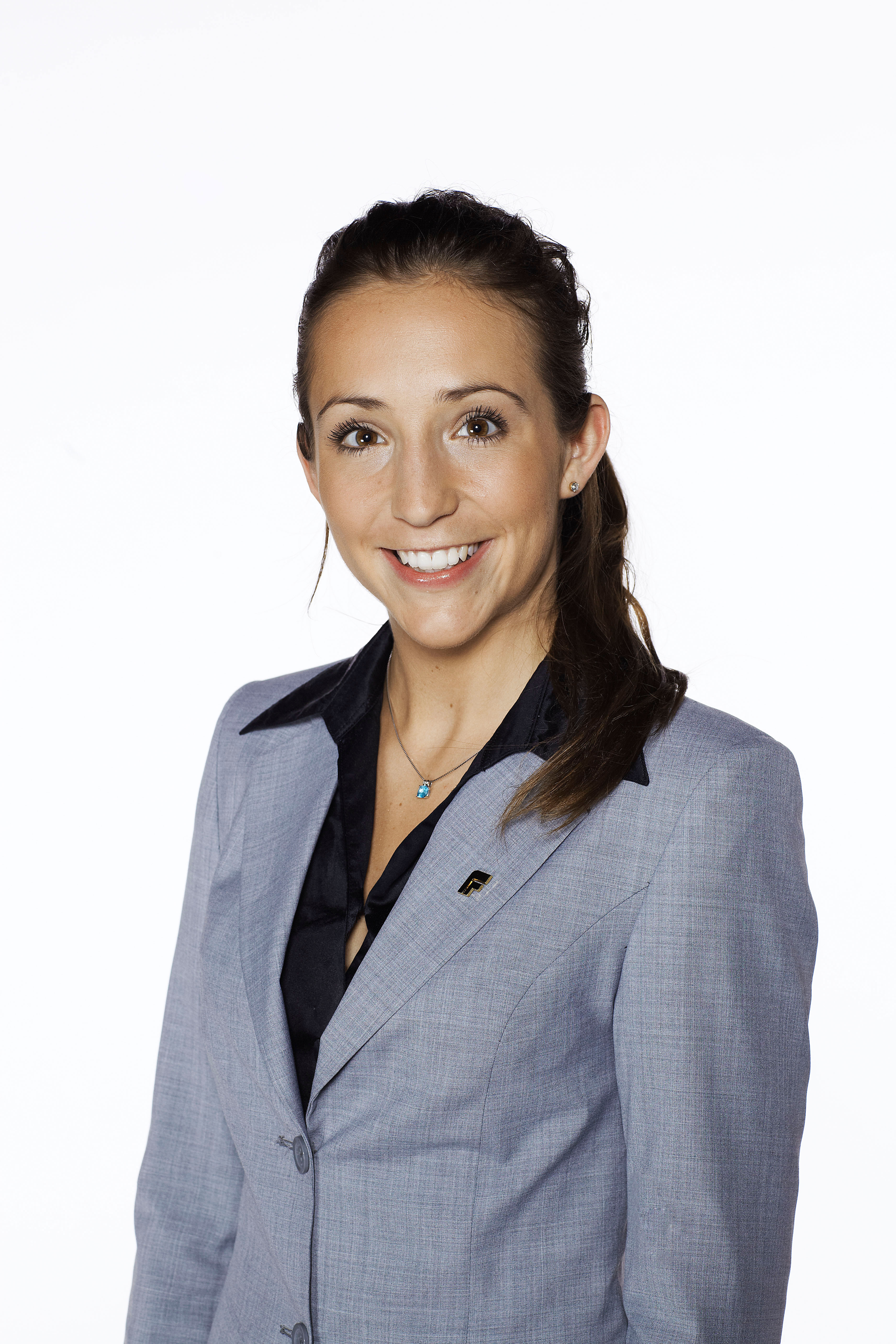

Member of the Norwegian Parliament for Møre og Romsdal
- In office 2009–2013

Personal details
- Born: 4 June 1987 (age 38) Molde, Norway
- Party: Progress Party

Mette Hanekamhaug (born 4 June 1987) is a Norwegian politician for the Progress Party. In the 2009 parliamentary election, she was the youngest person to be elected to the Norwegian Parliament (Stortinget). Hanekamhaug represents the county of Møre og Romsdal.

== Background ==
After finishing secondary school in Molde Municipality, Hanekamhaug started working towards a bachelor's degree at BI Norwegian Business School in 2008. She has been involved in politics since 2004, when she became chairman of the local youth wing of the Progress Party (Youth of the Progress Party). Both her parents are active in the party, her mother as a county council representative, her father as a member of the municipal council. She went on to become chairman of the county youth organisation in 2005, and a member of the county council in 2007. From 2007 to 2008, she also worked as a trainee for the central organisation of the party, in the role of personal assistant to party leader Siv Jensen. In 2010 Hanekamhaug decided to become active in the youth organization, and took the role as first deputy chairman.

== Parliament ==
Hanekamhaug was nominated as the Progress Party's third candidate from Møre og Romsdal in the 2009 parliamentary election, and was elected because of good results for her party in that part of Norway. At 22 years, she became the youngest representative in the assembly. Her seat, however, was the final leveling seat in parliament, and as such was at first somewhat precarious. It was reported on 21 September that her seat had been lost, though later the same day it became clear that this information was due to a data entry error. Final results were released on 24 September, confirming Hanekamhaug's seat.

== Views and issues ==
Hanekamhaug received some negative attention for a remark she made at a school debate, comparing Prime Minister Jens Stoltenberg to the sexual predator known as "The Pocket Man", intended as a criticism of the government's fiscal policies. She later apologised for this statement. She was also ridiculed for an interview where she allegedly stated that she did not consider books to be culture, which she later claimed to have said that she did not consider reading books a cultural experience, and that she had a great interest in Norwegian literature. Hanekamhaug is particularly involved in educational politics and issues of road safety and infrastructure. She has mentioned among her political idols United States President Barack Obama, British Prime Minister Margaret Thatcher, and Norwegian Progress Party politician Carl I. Hagen.
