= Vera Lysklætt =

Norwegian politician (born 1954)

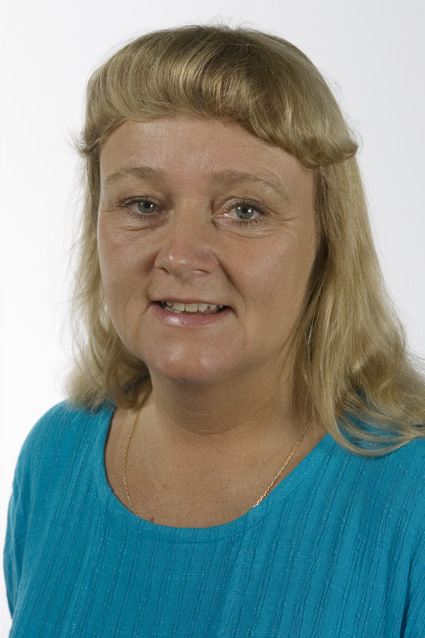
Vera Lysklætt (2005)

Vera Lysklætt (born 29 January 1954 in Jøssund) is a Norwegian politician for the Liberal Party (V). She was elected to the Norwegian Parliament from Finnmark in 2005. She came in on a leveling seat, in spite of low local support in the county with only 818 votes, or 2 percent.

She was a member of the municipal council for Karasjok Municipality from 1999 to 2003.

== Parliamentary Committee duties ==
- 2005 - 2009 member of the Standing Committee on Local Government and Public Administration.
