= Leveling seat =

Tool used to make legislatures more proportional

Leveling seats (Danish: tillægsmandat, Swedish: utjämningsmandat, Norwegian: utjevningsmandater, Icelandic: jöfnunarsæti, German: Ausgleichsmandat), commonly known also as adjustment seats, are an election mechanism employed for many years by all Nordic countries (except Finland) in elections for its national legislatures. Germany also used national leveling seats for its legislature's lower chamber, the Bundestag, from 2013 to 2023. Leveling seats are seats of additional members elected to supplement the members directly elected by each constituency. The purpose of the additional seats is to ensure that each party's share of the total seats is roughly proportional to the party's overall shares of votes at the national level.

== Usage by country ==
=== Denmark ===
In 1915, Denmark became one of the first countries in the world to introduce leveling seats in its parliamentary elections. Since then, all parliamentary elections in Denmark have allocated the adjustment seats as a substantial fraction of the seats in the parliament. The parliamentary seats currently comprise 135 county seats and 40 leveling seats, with a further 4 "North Atlantic seats" elected separately by proportional representation in the Faroe Islands and Greenland (which are not treated as an integral part of the Danish election system). The leveling seats are supplementary to the normal seats, which are allocated by proportional votes within each county. All parties that achieve at least 2% of the national votes are granted as many leveling seats as required to achieve proportional representation at the national level.

=== Germany ===
Traditionally, Germany's mixed member proportional system awarded overhang seats with no compensation at the national level. That led to a particularly notorious case of negative vote weight after the 2005 German federal election in which voting was delayed by two weeks in the constituency of Dresden I, and it was determined that too much support for Christian Democratic Union would cause the party to lose an overhang seat in the close election. In February 2013, a resultant decision of the Federal Constitutional Court determined negative vote weight was unconstitutional and demanded a reform of the electoral law. The system of leveling seats, which already existed on the state level, was introduced on the national level.

After the 2021 German federal election resulted in a Bundestag with 736 seats, which made it the largest freely-elected parliament in the world because of the large number of leveling seats, debate renewed about how to rein in its size. A 2023 reform removed the leveling seats and instead allocated seats solely by party list votes (meaning that a candidate elected in a local constituency can fail to get into parliament, if their party does not receive enough votes on a national level). That is known as "second vote coverage" (Zweitstimmendeckung).

=== Iceland ===
Leveling seats have been part of the election procedures for all Icelandic parliamentary elections since 1934.

=== Norway ===
Leveling seats were introduced in Norway in the 1989 parliamentary election, when there were 8 such seats. Since 2005, there are 19 leveling mandates, one for each electoral district. Its current form is based on the following principles:

- In order to be eligible for leveling seats, a party must get at least 4% (the exclusion threshold) of the national popular vote. A party may attain enough votes in a given county to elect a representative but may fail to be eligible for leveling seats.
- The number of representatives elected per county is a function of the total population in the county and the area of the county. Hence, Finnmark needs fewer votes to elect a representative (7,409 in 2005) than Oslo (18,167 the same election).
- Of 169 representatives, 150 are elected by popular vote within the county, which means that a party that achieves 40% of the popular vote in a county sends about 40% of the total number of representatives from that county.
- The remaining 19 representatives are allocated one to each county but are elected based on nationwide results for a party as long as the popular vote at the national level for that party exceeds the exclusion threshold of 4%. Each representative thus represents an approximately equal number of voters.

In the 2005 elections, the average number of votes on a national level was largely similar across party lines. The largest party, the Norwegian Labour Party, required the fewest votes per representative with 14,139; the party that needed the most votes was the Christian People's Party, with 16,262. On a county-by-county basis, however, there were greater disparities: Sogn og Fjordane needed only 3,503 votes to elect one representative from the Liberal Party, but Akershus needed 22,555 to elect one representative from the Socialist Left Party.

The arrangement has gone through several adjustments through the years and is the result of legislative action.

==== Allocation of leveling seats ====
The allocation of leveling seats is a fairly complex process. The leveling seats are first distributed among the parties. The second stage distributes them among the counties.

===== Allocation among parties =====
1. A nationwide "ideal" distribution of all 169 seats is calculated using the Sainte-Laguë method for the eligible parties. If a party that did not reach the electoral threshold still wins seats, the party keeps those seats, and the number of seats to distribute is reduced accordingly. In 2009 the Liberal Party failed to reach the threshold but won two seats. Therefore, only 167 seats were taken into account for the ideal distribution.
2. If a party already has won more seats than the ideal distribution indicates, the party keeps those seats but wins no leveling seats. In that case, another ideal distribution is made between the parties still eligible for leveling seats, that may be repeated if the revised distribution again shows a party with too many seats. In 2009, the first ideal distribution showed that the Labour Party should have 63 seats overall, but it had already won 64. Those seats were taken out of consideration, and so another ideal distribution of the remaining 103 seats was made between the Progress Party, the Conservative Party, the Christian Democrats, the Centre Party, and the Socialist Left Party.
3. Once a final ideal distribution has been settled, the number of leveling seats awarded to each party is equal to that party's ideal number of seats minus the number of seats already won from each county.

===== Allocating among counties =====
To determine the county that each party will receive its leveling seats in, the following process occurs:

1. For each county and eligible party, determine the first unused quotient when the regular district seats were distributed. If the party has not yet won a seat from that county, the quotient is equal to the number of votes the party received there. If the party already has won one mandate from that seat, the quotient is the number of votes received in that county divided by 3, if the party has already won two seats from the county, the quotient is the number of votes divided by 5, and so on.
2. The quotients for each county and party are divided by the total number of votes for all parties in that county and multiplied by the number of regular non-leveling seats allocated to that county. That leaves a table of fractions for each county and party.
3. The first leveling seat goes to the county and party corresponding to the highest fraction in the table. The second leveling seat goes to county and party corresponding the next highest fraction in the table, and so on. Each time that a leveling seat is determined, the remaining fractions for the county that gave its leveling seat are taken out of consideration. Once a party has received all the leveling seats to which it is entitled, the remaining fractions for that party are also taken out of consideration. The process continues until all 19 leveling seats have been distributed.

==== Peculiarities ====
The method for assigning leveling seats usually results in the first leveling seats being given to candidates that did fairly well in the county. However, the last leveling seats may be awarded to candidates that received few votes in the county that they will represent. (In theory, it is even possible for a party to receive a leveling seat even in a county which they received no votes or even in a county in which it had no candidates, a scenario for which the election law has no contingency.) An illustration came in 2005, when Vera Lysklætt of the Liberal Party received the last leveling seat, in Finnmark, with 826 votes. Thus, the Liberal Party gained 20% of Finnmark's seats with about 2% of the vote there.

In the 2009 election, a programming fault in the software calculating the allocation prognosis for one county made its leveling seat go to another party. That changed the outcome in two other counties, and it took over a week and a recount for the distribution of leveling seats to be finally decided. Mette Hanekamhaug got the final seat.

=== Sweden ===
Since 1970, Sweden has used leveling seats in its elections for both the Riksdag and the county councils, for parties that qualify with a total share of votes above a 4%-limit in parliamentary elections and 3%-limit in county council elections. Sweden did not use leveling seats for municipal elections prior to 2018. With the new election law (effective from the election 2018), leveling seats are used in municipalities with more than one electoral district.

Of the 349 seats in the Riksdag, 310 are fixed seats, and 39 are adjustment seats. The 310 fixed seats are distributed among the 29 electoral districts (Swedish: valkretsar) according to the largest remainder method with the Hare quota. The distribution of seats between the parties then takes place in four stages.

==== Leveling seat allocation ====
During the first stage, the fixed seats are distributed within each district according to the modified Sainte-Laguë method (jämkade uddatalsmetoden) with the first divisor adjusted to 1.2 (1.4 in elections before 2018). Only parties that have received at least 4% of the vote nationally or 12% of the vote within the district can participate in the distribution of seats.

During the second stage, the 349 seats are distributed through a calculation based on the total number of votes summed up across the entire country. In that distribution, only parties that have received more than 4% of the national vote are included. Parties that fall below 4 percent nationally but have been awarded fixed seats in districts in which they have had more than 12% of the vote are disregarded, and their seats are subtracted from the calculation. If a party has received 2 seats in that fashion, for example, the calculation will be made with 347 seats. Again, the modified Sainte-Laguë method is used.

During the third stage, a summary is made of the fixed seats that the parties have achieved, which is compared to the outcome of the nationwide distribution above. If a party has received more fixed seats than its share of the total 349-seat distribution, district seats allocated to that party are retracted and given to the party with the second 'highest quotient'. The parties are then awarded a number of adjustment seats sufficient to cover the gap between their number of fixed seats and their share in the nationwide distribution.

Finally, the adjustment seats that each party has received are distributed among the districts. The application of the Sainte-Laguë number gives each party a quotient ('comparison number', jämförelsetal) in each district, which is its number of votes in the district divided by (2n+1), where n is the number of seats it has been awarded. The district where the party has the highest quotient is awarded an adjustment seat, and a new quotient is then calculated for that district, before the next adjustment seat is distributed. In theory, a district can thus receive more than one adjustment seat. If a party is yet to receive a seat in the district, its quotient simply is the number of votes it received. When the fixed seats were distributed among the parties in the district, the number was divided by 1.4, which made it more difficult for a party to achieve its first seat. Now, however, no such division takes place. The method used is thus pure and not modified Sainte-Laguë.

==== In local elections ====
In elections to the county councils, the same principles are followed with some differences. Only parties that have received more than 3% of the vote in the county may participate in the distribution of seats. There is no 12% clause or other possibility for parties that fall below that threshold to gain seats. Finally, the number of adjustment seats is one tenth of the number of seats in the county council. If one tenth is a fractional number (which it always is since the number of seats in a county council is required to be odd), the fraction is always adjusted upwards and so a county council with 51 seats would have 45 fixed seats and 6 adjustment seats.

== See also ==
- Additional Member System
- Biproportional apportionment
- Mixed-member proportional representation
