= Bolkesjø =

Village in Notodden Municipality, Norway

- Village
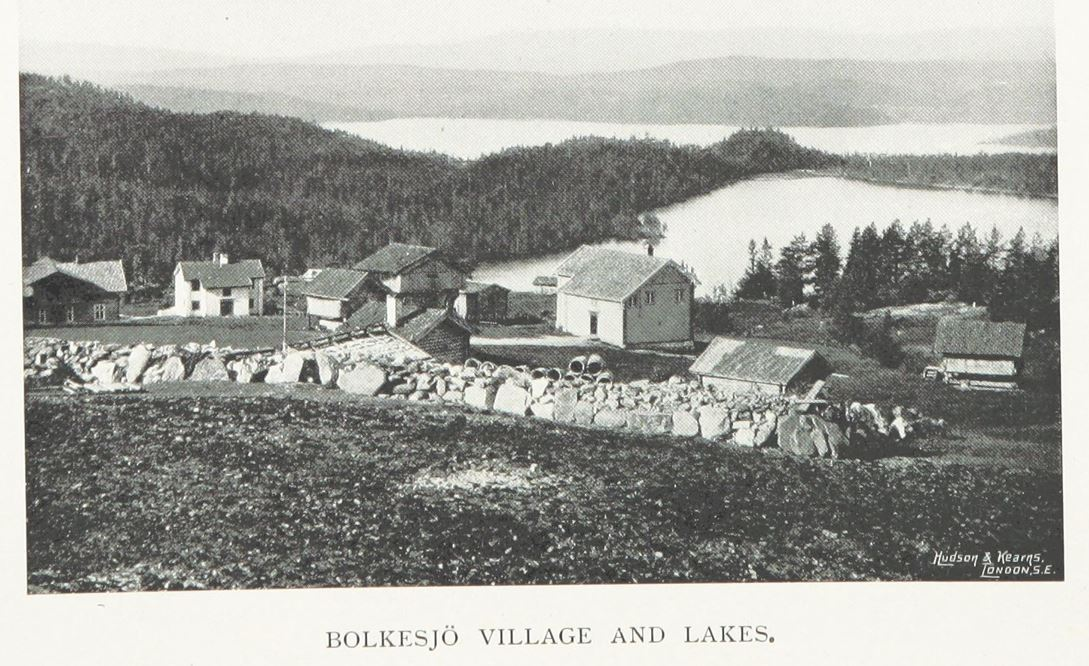
- View of the village and lake in 1896
- Interactive map of Bolkesjø
- Coordinates: 59.72475°N 9.27692°E
- Country: Norway
- Region: Eastern Norway
- County: Telemark
- District: Aust-Telemark
- Municipality: Notodden Municipality
- Elevation: 437 m (1,434 ft)
- Time zone: UTC+01:00 (CET)
  - Summer (DST): UTC+02:00 (CEST)
- Post Code: 3680 Notodden

Bolkesjø is a village in Notodden Municipality in Telemark county, Norway. The village is located along the Norwegian county road 37, about 18 kilometres (11 mi) to the northeast of the village of Gransherad and about 20 kilometres (12 mi) to the north of the town of Notodden. The village is located along a small lake that is also named Bolkesjø. There are also hotels and resorts in the village. The mountain Bletoppen lies about 12 kilometres (7.5 mi) to the northwest.

The 1994 Progress Party national convention took place at one of the hotels in Bolkesjø.

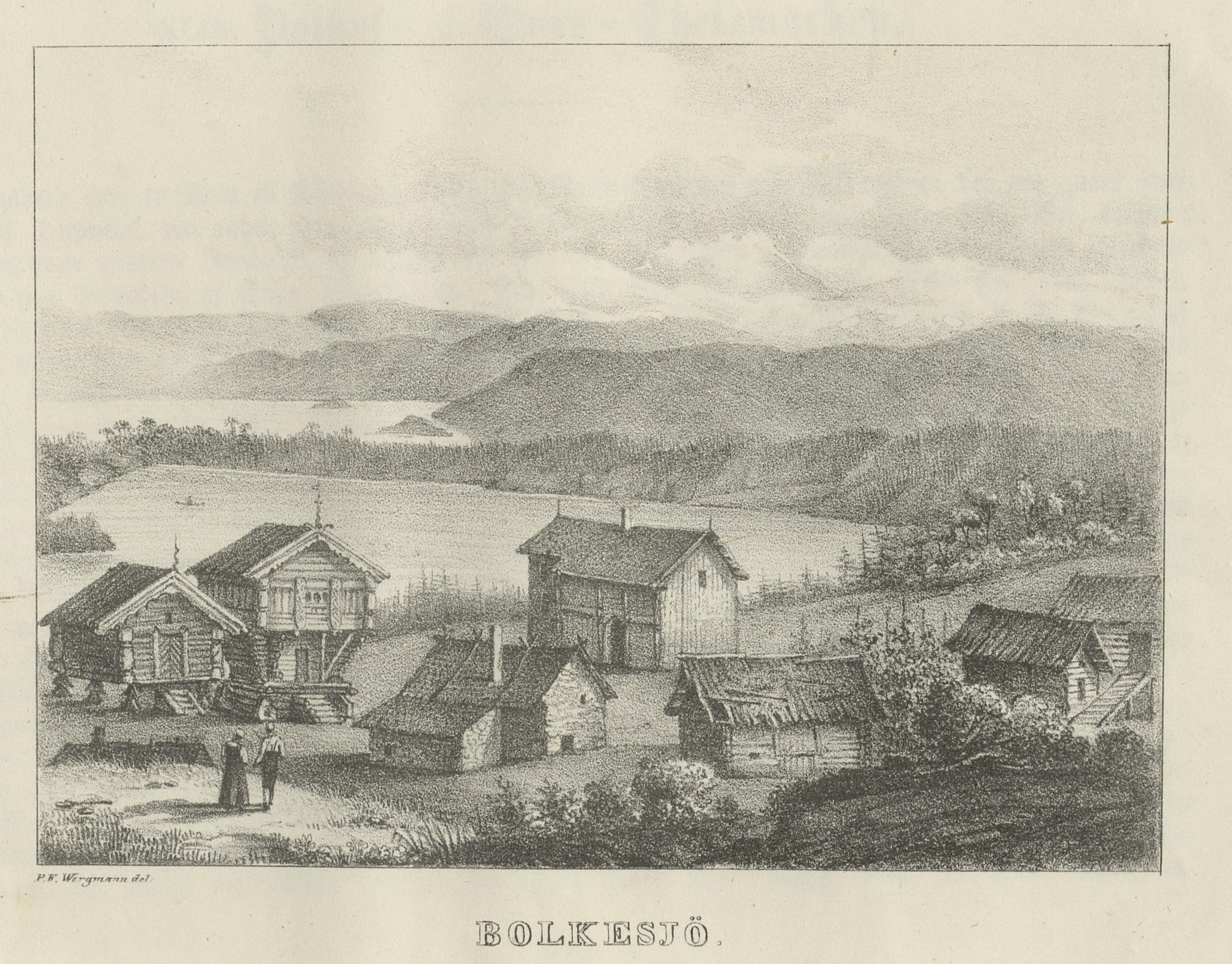
Drawing of the village in 1837
