= Torgeir Trældal =

Norwegian politician

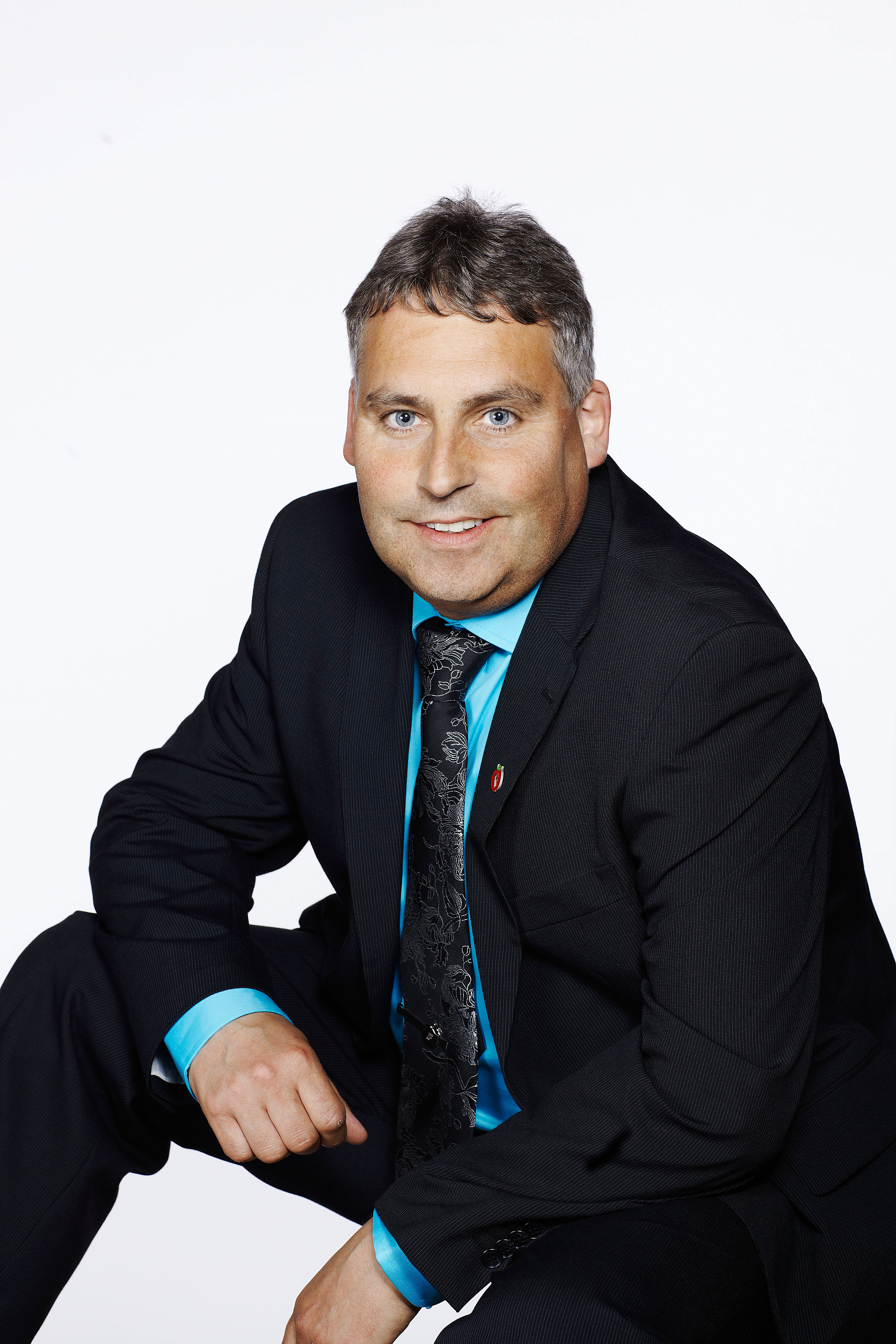
Norwegian member of parliament, Torgeir Trældal

Torgeir Trældal (born 1965) is a Norwegian politician and member of parliament from representing Nordland for the Progress Party.

Trældal is from Narvik and served in the city council as leader of the opposition in that town until his election to parliament. In 2006, Trældal was sued by the against leaders in Narvik Energi for alleged slanderous statements about economic misconduct in the energy company. Although he was convicted in the trial court, the Court of appeal ruled in Trældal's favor, and the Supreme Court turned down the energy company's appeal.

The Progress Party nominated Trældal as their third candidate from Nordland in the 2009 election. During the election Trældal campaigned on improving the municipality finances, building the Hålogaland Bridge without toll stations, and permitting oil activity in Lofoten and Vesterålen.

Trældal won the county's leveling seat, and is one of three members of parliament from Narvik. In parliament, Trældal became the Progress Party's spokesman for agricultural issues, and supported a freer market in meat production.

Outside politics Trældal is a trained firefighter.
