= Erik Andersen (politician) =

Norwegian politician (born 1937)

Erik Andersen (born 28 July 1937) is a Norwegian politician for the Progress Party.

He served as a deputy representative to the Parliament of Norway from Vestfold during the terms 1989–1993, 1993–1997 and 2001–2005. In total he met during 32 days of parliamentary session.
