= Tore Bråthen =

Norwegian jurist (born 1954)

Tore Bråthen (born September 12, 1954) is a Norwegian jurist, and Professor of Law and Head of Department of Accounting, Auditing and Law at BI Norwegian Business School in Oslo, and adjunct professor at the law faculty of the University of Tromsø.

Bråthen graduated from the University of Oslo with a cand.jur. degree in 1984, and took the dr.juris. degree in 1998.

In 1998, he became a professor at the BI Norwegian Business School, having been an associate professor at the University of Oslo since 1984. At BI he also heads the Department of Accounting - Auditing and Law. He is also working as an assisting professor at the University of Tromsø.

== Selected bibliography ==
- Personklausuler i aksjeselskaper, 1998
- Selskapsrett 2006
