= Tor Mikkel Wara =

Norwegian politician

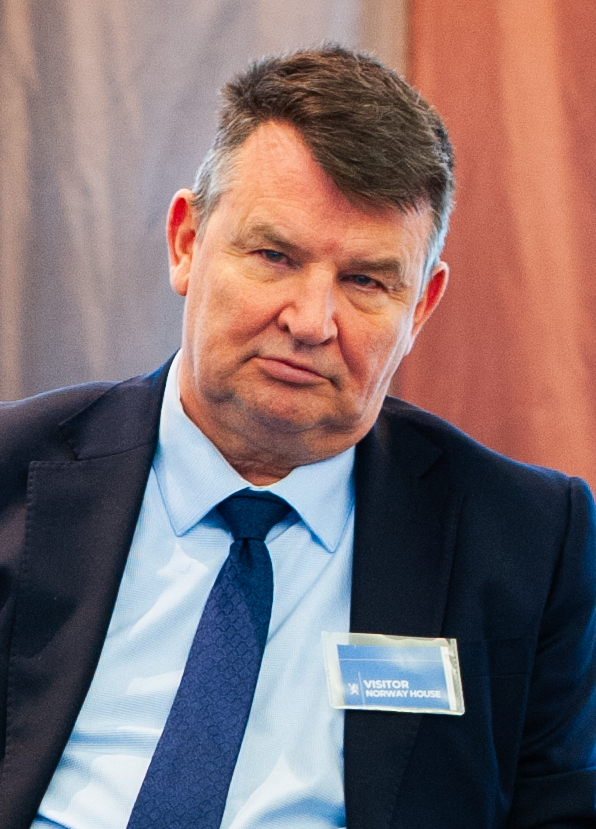
- Wara in 2026

Minister of Justice, Public Security and Immigration
- In office 4 April 2018 – 29 March 2019
- Prime Minister: Erna Solberg
- Preceded by: Sylvi Listhaug
- Succeeded by: Jøran Kallmyr

Member of the Norwegian Parliament
- Incumbent
- Assumed office 1 October 2025
- Constituency: Oslo
- In office 23 October 1989 – 30 September 1993
- Constituency: Oslo

First Deputy Leader of the Progress Party
- In office 3 May 1991 – 23 April 1993
- Leader: Carl I. Hagen
- Preceded by: Pål Atle Skjervengen
- Succeeded by: Ellen Wibe

Personal details
- Born: 27 December 1964 (age 61) Karasjok, Finnmark, Norway
- Party: Progress
- Domestic partner: Laila Anita Bertheussen (formerly)
- Children: 2 (1 stepchild)

Tor Mikkel Wara (born 27 December 1964) is a Norwegian politician from the Progress Party, who has served as a member of the Storting for Oslo since 2025, previously from 1989 to 1993. He previously served as the Minister of Justice and Immigration from 2018 to 2019 after the resignation of Sylvi Listhaug.

== Political career ==
=== Local politics ===
Wara was a member of the municipal council for Oslo Municipality between 1987 and 1989. During the same period he was the chairman of the Youth of the Progress Party, and became known as a young rising star within the party.

=== Party politics ===
Wara served as the party's first deputy leader from 1991 to 1993. He left the Progress Party the same year and quit active politics. While he was one of the main players of the young libertarians within the party in the early 1990s, he was contrary to popular belief not part of the "Dolkesjø" incident in 1994.

As the leadership of the Progress Party in 2006 changed hands from Carl I. Hagen to Siv Jensen, Wara was before the 2009 election spoken of as a possible Minister of Finance for the party in an eventual government, with the recent broad popular support for the party.

=== Parliament ===
He was elected to the Storting for the Progress Party from Oslo at the 1989 and served until 1993.

In April 2024, Wara announced his intent to return to parliament in the 2025 election and was re-elected from Oslo. He additionally became his party's spokesperson on energy and environmental affairs. He also joined the Standing Committee on Energy and the Environment and became its first vice chair.

=== Minister of Justice ===
On 4 April 2018, he was appointed Minister of Justice by Erna Solberg, following the resignation of Sylvi Listhaug making a controversial post on Facebook.

==== Tenure ====
On 30 April, Wara took part in a Dagsrevyen debate with the Governing Mayor of Oslo, Raymond Johansen regarding immigration in Oslo. Wara notably blamed gang criminality on the increase of immigration in the capital. He further added that gang issues was attributed to ethnic and cultural issues, and that it was the reason for why it was important to stop immigration in Oslo. Johansen defended the city's handling of immigration, citing increase in borough spending and the strengthening of kindergartens and better opportunities to learn Norwegian.

In November 2018, a photo of Wara's private residence was used on stage for political commentary in the play Ways of Seeing, a production of the Black Box theatre in Oslo. Wara's long-term live-in partner Laila Anita Bertheussen along with Prime Minister Erna Solberg sharply criticized the production for exposing the Wara household in this manner, and in December 2018, Bertheussen filed a formal complaint against the theatre.

On 7 December 2018, Wara condemned the threats and called it "an attack on Norwegian democracy. It's bad and serious".

Over the following months, the family received threatening letters and their house was vandalized with graffiti, before the apparent harassment culminated on 10 March 2019 with an arson attack on their car. Wara took a leave of absence on 15 March, with Jon Georg Dale serving as acting justice minister until further. However, four days after the arson attack, Bertheussen was arrested on suspicion of having staged the entire harassment campaign herself, prompting Wara to resign his position on 28 March.

The trial concluded on 13 November 2020. Accused of endangering democracy, Bertheussen potentially faced up to 16 years in prison. On 15 January 2021, she was sentenced to one year and eight months prison for three of four charges.

== Personal life ==
Wara was born in Karasjok Municipality, a son of police chief Thor Birger Wara and office clerk Hulda Synnøve Berg. He was in a relationship with Laila Anita Bertheussen for twenty-eight years until their separation in 2023. He has two now grown-up children: one daughter and one step-daughter.

Party political offices
| Preceded by Pål Atle Skjervengen | Chairman of the Youth of the Progress Party; 1987–1989 | Succeeded by Jan Erik Fåne |
| Preceded by Pål Atle Skjervengen | First Deputy Leader of the Progress Party; 1991–1993 | Succeeded by Ellen Wibe |
Political offices
| Preceded by Sylvi Listhaug | Minister of Justice, Public Security and Immigration; 2018–2019 | Succeeded by Jøran Kallmyr |
