= Fremskritt =

Norwegian newspaper

Fremskritt (literally "Progress") was a Norwegian political newspaper. It was the official party organ of the Progress Party. As of 2014 the paper is defunct.

== History and profile ==
Fremskritt was established in 1974. The paper was distributed 22 times per year to all members of the Progress Party. It was also available as a free internet newspaper.
