= Ellen Wibe =

Norwegian politician (born 1965)

First Deputy Leader of the Progress Party
- In office 23 April 1993 – 16 April 1994
- Leader: Carl I. Hagen
- Preceded by: Tor Mikkel Wara
- Succeeded by: Lodve Solholm

Personal details
- Born: 9 January 1965 (age 60); Namsskogan Municipality, Norway
- Political party: Progress Party
- Spouse: Odd Magnar Brubæk

Ellen Margrethe Wibe (born 9 January 1965) is a Norwegian communications worker, society commentator and former politician.

She was active in politics for five years for the Progress Party. From 1993 until 1994 she was the first deputy leader of the party, and for a while general secretary of the Youth of the Progress Party.

Wibe was among the most notable young libertarians that had started to influence the party in the early 1990s, but left the party in 1994 following the national convention at Bolkesjø.

Wibe is married to Odd Magnar Brubæk, former secretary of the parliamentary group of the party, who some time earlier was also forced to leave the party following his criticism of the parliamentary role of chairman Carl I. Hagen's wife Eli Hagen.
