= Steinar Maribo =

Norwegian politician (born 1942)

Steinar Maribo (born 22 January 1942 in Åsnes) is a Norwegian politician for the Progress Party.

He was elected to the Norwegian Parliament from Buskerud in 1989, but was not re-elected in 1993.

Maribo held various positions in Røyken municipality council from 1983 to 1997, serving as deputy mayor in 1987–1989.
