= Terje Nyberget =

Norwegian military officer and politician

- Born: 8 July 1953 (age 72); Østre Toten, Norway
- Occupation: Politician
- Political party: Progress Party

Terje Nyberget (born 8 July 1953) is a Norwegian military officer and politician.

== Biography ==
Nyberget was born in Østre Toten Municipality to Egil Nyberget and Solveig Lundstad. He was elected representative to the Storting from the constituency of Troms for the period 1989–1993, representing the Progress Party.
