= Petter Bjørheim =

Norwegian politician (1965–2026)

Petter Bjørheim (2 January 1965 – 24 February 2026) was a Norwegian politician for the Progress Party.

== Life and career ==
Bjørheim was born in Stavanger on 2 January 1965. He was elected to the Norwegian Parliament from Rogaland in 1989, but was not re-elected in 1993.

Bjørheim died on 24 February 2026, at the age of 61.
