= Atle Simonsen =

Norwegian politician

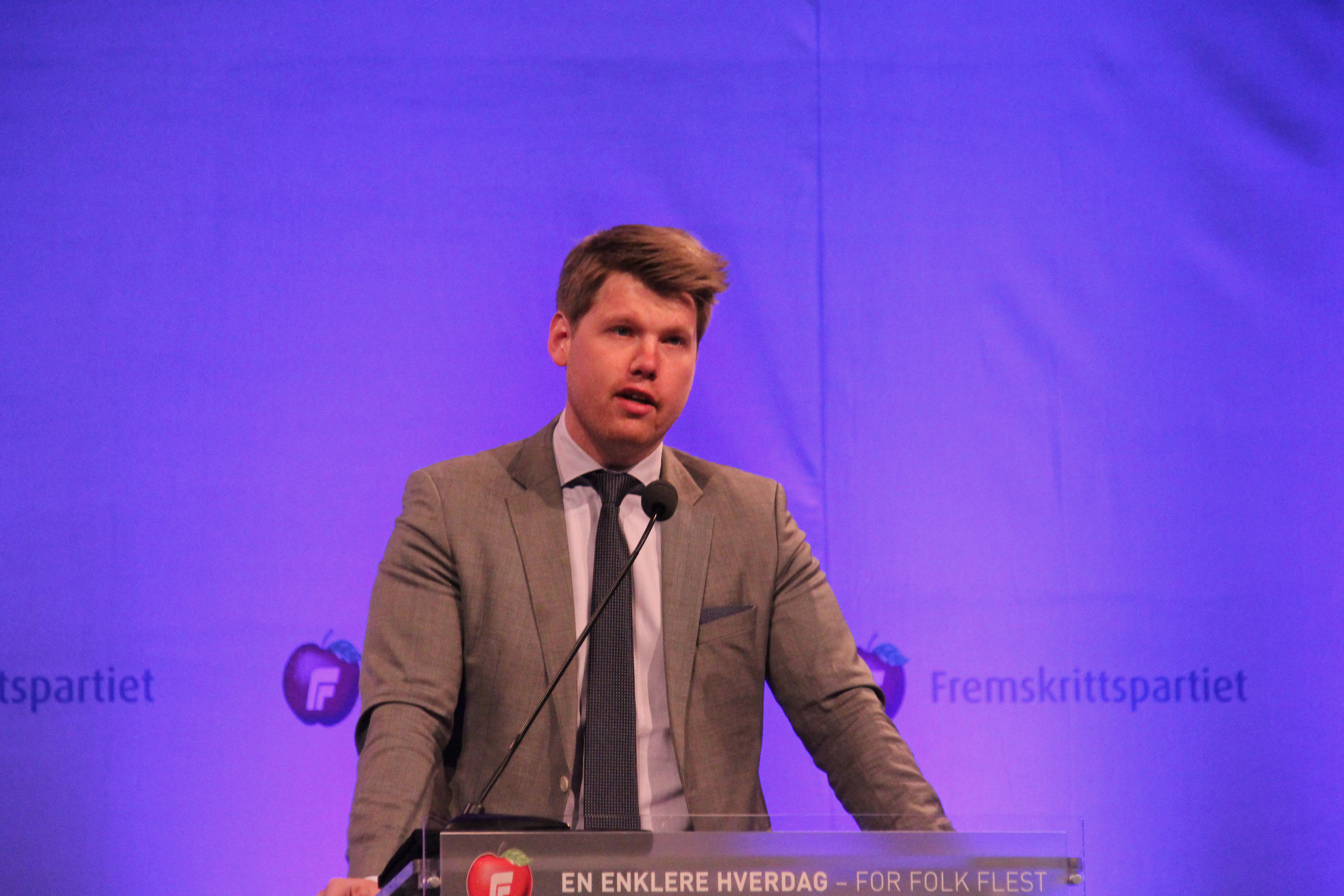
- Simonsen in 2014
- Born: 4 November 1988 (age 37); Sola Municipality, Norway
- Occupation: Politician
- Political party: Progress Party

Atle Simonsen (born 4 November 1988) is a Norwegian politician.

== Career ==
Simonsen was elected deputy representative to the Storting from the constituency of Rogaland, for the period 2017–2021 for the Progress Party. He replaced Solveig Horne at the Storting from October 2017, where he was a member of the Standing Committee on Labour and Social Affairs.

He was political advisor in the Ministry of Health from 2016 to 2017. He was appointed as State Secretary in the Ministry of Education and Research in 2018, and in the Ministry of Finance from 2018 to 2020.
