= Bente Øyan Sveum =

Norwegian politician

Bente Øyan Sveum, formerly named Bjørnstad (born 4 December 1945) is a Norwegian politician for the Progress Party.

She served as a deputy representative to the Parliament of Norway from Akershus during the terms 1989–1993, 1993–1997 and 2001–2005. In total she met during 193 days of parliamentary session.

She was born and grew up in eastern Oslo. She was a member of Lørenskog municipal council from 1994 to 1995 and of the executive committee in Lørenskog from 1997 to 1998. From 1995 to 1998 she was a member of Akershus county council. She was also a member of the school board from 1993 to 1995, and of other local and regional boards. She chaired her municipal party chapter in 1991 and from 1993 to 1994, and the county chapter from 1994 to 1995.
