= Free Democrats (Norway) =

Norwegian political organization

Logo of the Free Democrats.

The Free Democrats (Norwegian: Fridemokratene) is a political organization formed by former members of the Progress Party of Norway in 1994.

The 1993 election saw the support of the Progress Party (6.3 percent and 10 representatives) halved. After the 1994 Progress Party national convention several representatives of the "libertarian wing" broke out and founded a party more ideologically consistently libertarian, the Free Democrats. Four of the defectors were MPs, and formed an independent group in Parliament of Norway.

Its first leader Ellen Christine Christiansen was among the four MPs, and also served in Oslo city council until 1995.

In the Norwegian county elections, 1995 the party received 1,932 votes, 0.09% of the votes. The Free Democrats no longer participate in elections and function merely as a think tank and organization for Norwegian libertarians, regardless of their political allegiance. People associated with the Free Democrats also founded the online newspaper Liberaleren.

== Issues ==
According to its webpage, its main policies are:

- End conscription
- Full free trade
- Separation of church and state
- Legalization of drugs
- Free immigration

== Presidents of the Free Democrats ==
- 1994–1996 : Ellen Christine Christiansen
- 1996–1998 : Heidi Nordby Lunde
- 1998–1999 : Bent Johan Mosfjell
- 1999–2000 : Kristian Norheim
- 2000–2003 : Hans Jørgen Lysglimt
- 2003–2005 : Sverre Berg

== See also ==
- Liberal People's Party, a party with a similar ideology
