= Ulf Leirstein =

Norwegian politician

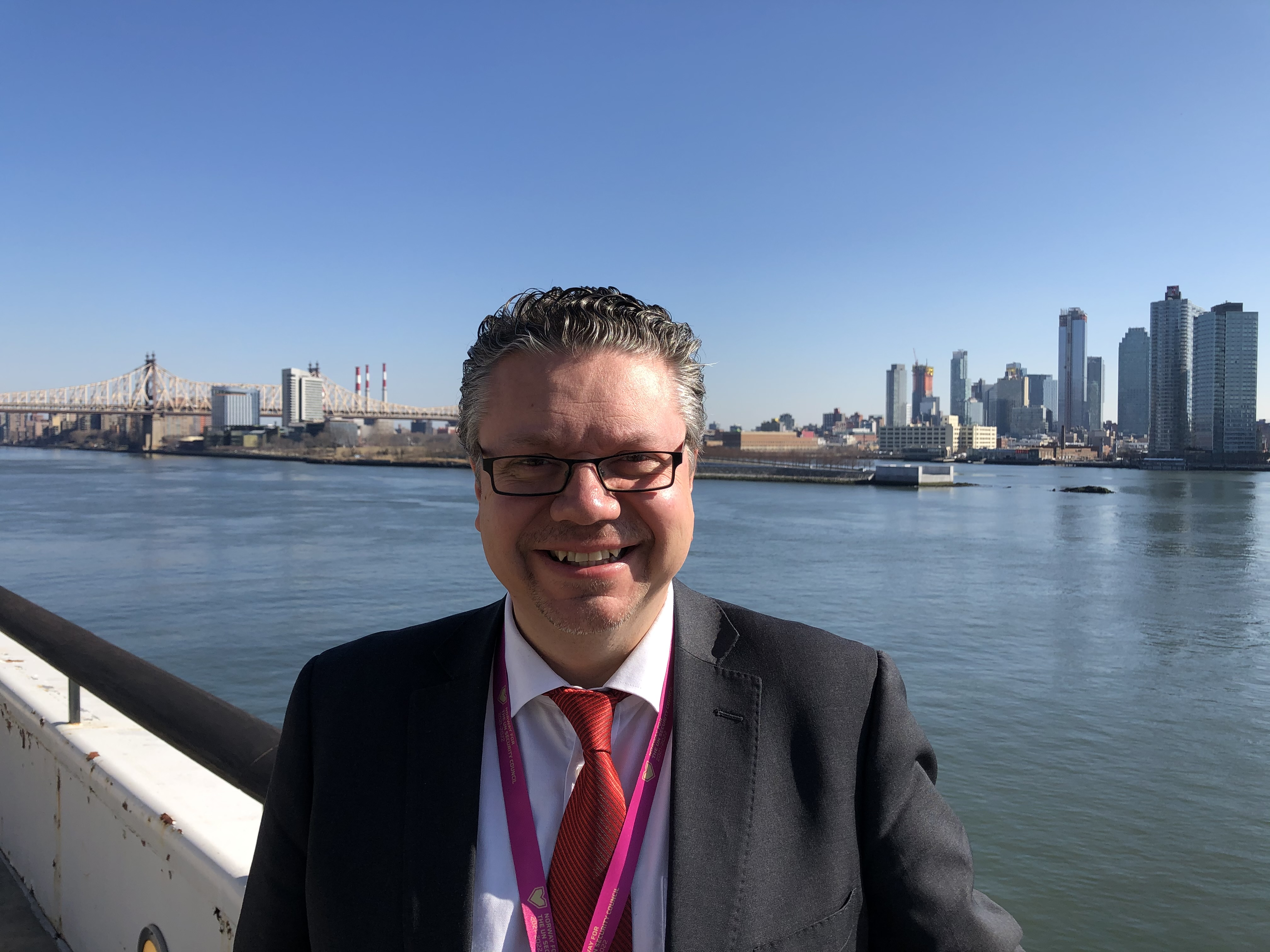
- Ulf Leirstein at FpU national convention 2012

Member of the Norwegian Parliament
- In office 1 October 2005 – 30 September 2021
- Constituency: Østfold

Personal details
- Born: 30 June 1973 (age 53) Sarpsborg, Østfold, Norway
- Party: Progress (until 2019); Independent (2019–21)

Ulf Isak Leirstein (born 30 June 1973) is a Norwegian politician, formerly for the Progress Party and then independent, and a member of the Storting from 2005 to 2021. He left the party after it was revealed that he had sent pornographic pictures to a mailing list belonging to the Progress Party's youth wing.

== Biography ==
Leirstein was born in Sarpsborg. He was a member of the Moss municipal council from 1991 to 2007, and from 1995 to 2007 simultaneously of the Østfold county council. He was chairman of the Progress Party's Youth from 1994 to 1995, and served as deputy mayor of Moss from 1999 to 2003.

From 1996 to 2003, he worked as project leader at Standards Norway (formerly Norwegian Technology Centre). He was the leader of the School Committee of Moss from 1995 to 2003, and lay judge of the Moss District Court from 1995 to 2005. He has held board positions in several organisations and businesses, and has been a board member of the Port of Moss since 2015. He was a member of the Progress Party's central board from 2003 until 2011.

In 2005, Leirstein was elected to the Storting (Norwegian parliament) from Østfold, after having served as a deputy representative since 2001. He was re-elected to the Storting in 2009 and in 2013. He served as first deputy chair of the Standing Committee on Finance and Economic Affairs from 2005 to 2011, and since 2015 he has been first deputy leader of the Progress Party's parliamentary group. From October 2017 until January 2018, he was a member of the Standing Committee on Justice.

In January 2018, Leirstein withdrew from all his political positions and his membership of the Standing Committee on Justice after it was revealed that he had sent multiple emails containing pornographic images and videos to members of the Progress Party's Youth; the youngest recipient, being only 14, was below the age of consent at the time. It was also revealed that Leirstein had discussed inviting another underage member of Progress Party's Youth to a threesome with a female member of the Progress Party.

He would continue in Parliament throughout his term to 2021, moving over to the Standing Committee on Scrutiny and Constitutional Affairs. He resigned his party membership on 26 April 2019, continuing as an independent.

Party political offices
Preceded by Lars Erik Grønntun	Chairman of the Progress Party's Youth; 1994–1995	Succeeded by Klaus Jacobsen
