= Eli Hagen =

Norwegian politician

Eli Engum Hagen (born 26 October 1947 in Dombås, Oppland) is a Norwegian television presenter and the wife and secretary of the Norwegian politician Carl I. Hagen, former leader of the Progress Party. In recent years she has also made a name for herself as a television personality. The Norwegian author Jan Martin Iversen credited her with a significant role in the development and survival of the right-wing Progress Party in his 1998 book about its first 25 years.

== Career ==
=== Mishap while driving ===
In November 2001 she also caused headlines when, after dropping off her husband at an official dinner at the Royal Palace in Oslo, she accidentally drove her Volkswagen Passat down the steps in front of the palace, with the political press corps as shocked onlookers.

The following morning Dagbladet - one of the largest newspapers in Norway - filled its frontpage with a picture of the tire marked stairs and the headline "Eli took the stairs - with her car".

=== Memoir ===
In 2006 she created more headlines with the release of her autobiography Elskerinne, sekretær og hustru - Gift med Carl (Mistress, Secretary and Wife - Married to Carl), where she delivered frank observations and scornful descriptions of active, retired and even dead politicians. In the same book she mentioned her embarrassing drive down the palace stairs, and admitted she nearly "died of shame".

=== Television ===
In 2008 she had her debut as regular co-host of the talkshow Studio 5, a Norwegian version of The View. Since this she has become quite an active TV personality, appearing in numerous television shows, often displaying her outspoken nature mixed with irony and self ridicule.
