= Jan Erik Fåne =

Norwegian politician

Jan Erik Fåne (born 25 September 1965 in Oslo) is a Norwegian politician for the Progress Party.

He was elected to the Norwegian Parliament from Akershus in 1989, but was not re-elected in 1993.

On the local level, Fåne was a member of the executive council of Oppegård municipal council from 1987 to 1989, and of Ullensaker municipal council from 1995 to 1997. He then became chairman of the Youth of the Progress Party. He also edited the party newspaper Fremskritt from 1988 to 1990.

After his political career, Fåne has worked with public relations, in the company Geelmuyden.Kiese among others. In addition he has joined the Conservative Party.

Preceded by Tor Mikkel Wara	Chairman of the Youth of the Progress Party; 1990–1992	Succeeded by Lars Erik Grønntun
