= Progress Party's Youth =

Norwegian political party youth wing

Progress Party's Youth Fremskrittspartiets Ungdom
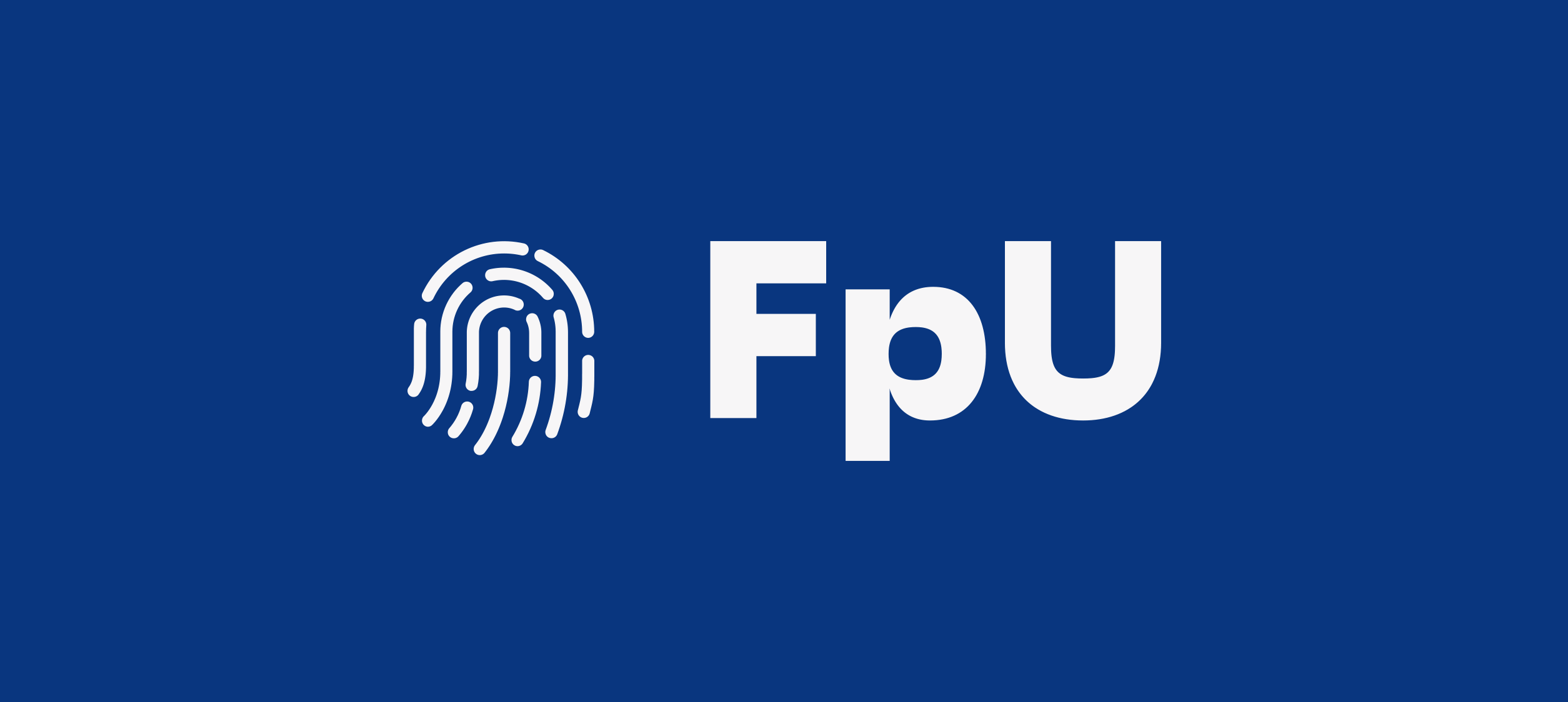
- Chairperson: Lars Barstad Løvold
- Founded: 10 February 1978
- Headquarters: Karl Johans gate 25, Oslo
- Ideology: Classical liberalism Right-libertarianism; Right-wing populism
- Colours: Blue
- Mother party: Progress Party
- European affiliation: European Young Conservatives
- Nordic affiliation: Nordens Liberale Ungdom (NLU)
- Website: fpu.no

The Progress Party's Youth (Bokmål: Fremskrittspartiets Ungdom, Nynorsk: Framstegspartiets Ungdom, FpU) is the youth wing of the Norwegian political party the Progress Party. It is generally considered to be more aligned towards classical liberalism than the Progress Party. The organisation has active chapters in all counties of Norway as well as in over 50 municipalities.

From 2012 to 2014, Himanshu Gulati was the organisation's chairperson. Gulati is the first leader of a youth wing of a major Norwegian political party with multi-cultural background. After being selected to the post of State Secretary in the Ministry of Justice, Gulati stepped down. In 2014, Atle Simonsen was elected chairperson Atle sat as chairman until 2016, when the annual national meeting of FpU elected Bjørn-Kristian Svendrud as the organisation's chairman.

Lars Barstad Løvold has been chief, since 2026. Earlier, the chairperson was Simen Velle. He was elected in 2022. Velle is a self-described classical liberal, advocating for policies like legalization of drugs, polygamy and sales of organs.

== History ==
The organization was officially founded by members of the Progress Party (FpU) on the annual party convention on 10–11 February 1978, the same convention where Carl I. Hagen was elected chairman of the party. The organization's first leader was the future mayor of Oslo, Peter N. Myhre, who served until 1984.

=== 1994 Bolkesjø purge ===
As soon as in 1989, rifts appeared within the FpU between a liberal and conservative faction. In the 1989 election several, hardline libertarians such as Pål Atle Skjervengen and Tor Mikkel Wara gained seats in the Storting and this further weakened the conservatives' position. That same year saw controversial proposals put forth by the liberals regarding gay marriage and immigration which sparked heated debates within among the youth members.

In 1992, the liberal Lars Grønntun was elected leader after a power struggle with Ingvar Myrvollen. This began a period of large-scale infighting which ultimately led to the board dissolving the organization, only to have the decision reversed by the party. After the expulsion of its entire liberal faction during the 1994 Progress Party national convention at Bolkesjø in Telemark, Ulf Leirstein became the new leader.

=== Recent history ===
Norwegian secondary schools hold school elections. The organization consistently polls better there than its parent party and emerged as the largest party nationwide in 1989, 2003, 2005 and 2009. In 2009, FpU set a new membership record of 3,031 members, although this number sank to 855 in 2020.

== Ideology and political positions ==
In the organization's manifesto, it states: "The Progress Party's Youth supports a free-market economy, regulated by supply and demand, without interference from government officials. A market economy is the economical system which gives the individual person greatest freedom of action". It also wishes to reform the welfare state with private insurance arrangements and increase privatization in the health and education sector, for one making the public hospitals "compete" with the privately owned hospitals for best possible care. It supports the legalization of medicinal cannabis, and more liberal drug laws in general.

== Leadership ==
=== List of chairpersons ===
- 1978–1984: Peter N. Myhre
- 1984–1987: Pål Atle Skjervengen
- 1987–1989: Tor Mikkel Wara
- 1989–1992: Jan Erik Fåne
- 1992–1994: Lars Erik Grønntun
- 1994–1995: Ulf Leirstein
- 1995–1996: Klaus Jakobsen
- 1996: Anders Anundsen
- 1996–1998: Reidar Helliesen
- 1998–1999: Anders Anundsen
- 1999–2002: Bård Hoksrud
- 2002–2008: Trond Birkedal
- 2008–2012: Ove André Vanebo
- 2012–2014: Himanshu Gulati
- 2014–2016: Atle Simonsen
- 2016–2020: Bjørn-Kristian Svendsrud
- 2020–2022: Andreas Brännström
- 2022–: Simen Velle

=== Current Central Committee ===
- Chairperson: Simen Velle
- First vice-chairperson: Ole Jakob Warlo
- Second vice-chairperson: Claudia Rebecka Brännström
- Member: Julianne Ofstad
- Member: Markus Gotaas
- Member: Mats Henriksen
- First reserve member: Joakim Myklebost Tangen
