= Kjell-Børge Freiberg =

Norwegian politician

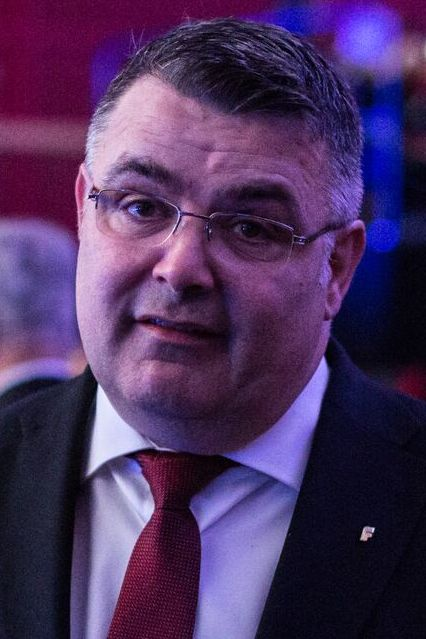

Minister of Petroleum and Energy
- In office 31 August 2018 – 18 December 2019
- Prime Minister: Erna Solberg
- Preceded by: Terje Søviknes
- Succeeded by: Sylvi Listhaug

Member of the Norwegian Parliament
- In office 1 October 2017 – 30 September 2021
- Deputy: Dagfinn Olsen
- Constituency: Nordland

State Secretary for the Ministry of Petroleum and Energy
- In office 23 October 2015 – 21 June 2017
- Prime Minister: Erna Solberg
- Minister: Tord Lien; Terje Søviknes
- Preceded by: Kåre Fostervold
- Succeeded by: Einar Remi Holmen

Mayor of Hadsel Municipality
- Incumbent
- Assumed office 19 October 2023
- Deputy: Renathe Marie Eriksen
- Preceded by: Lena Arntzen
- In office 17 October 2007 – 21 October 2015
- Deputy: Marion Celius; Inger Hope
- Preceded by: Reidar Johnsen
- Succeeded by: Siv Dagny Aasvik

Personal details
- Born: 27 April 1971 (age 54) Hadsel, Nordland, Norway
- Party: Conservative; Progress (formerly)
- Occupation: Politician

Kjell-Børge Freiberg (born 27 April 1971) is a Norwegian politician for the Conservative Party, formerly for the Progress Party who served as Minister of Petroleum and Energy from 2018 to 2019. He was also an MP for Nordland from 2017 to 2021. He currently serves as mayor of Hadsel Municipality since 2023, having done so previously from 2007 to 2015.

== Political career ==
=== Parliament ===
Following the 2017 election, he was elected as a representative to the Storting from Nordland.

Freiberg sought re-election for the 2021 election, but lost the nomination to Dagfinn Olsen in February 2021.

On 5 November 2021, Freiberg was excluded from his party after having allegedly leaked an internal document to Dagens Næringsliv. The document is said to have contained information of an investigation into Nordland Progress Party leader Dagfinn Olsen for having allegedly breached party guidelines. Freiberg didn't protest the exclusion and thanked for the journey he had in the party.

=== Local politics ===
==== Mayor of Hadsel (first term) ====
Freiberg served as the mayor of Hadsel Municipality from 2007 to 2015. During his tenure, Marion Celius of the Hadsel joint list was deputy mayor from 2007 to 2011, and then Inger Hope of the Conservative Party, from 2011 to 2015.

==== Mayor of Hadsel (second term) ====
In January 2023, he joined the Conservative Party and stood to become the Hadsel Conservatives' mayoral candidate in the 2023 local elections. Following the election, the Hadsel Conservatives formed a coalition with the Liberal Party and Melbu Cooperation list, with Freiberg as mayor. He was formally elected mayor on 19 October.

Freiburg called the municipal council in for an extraordinary session in September 2024, where he unannounced tabled a motion to fire the municipal director on the grounds of poor handling of the municipality's economy. The council approved the motion with 24 in favour and one against. Freiberg had despite this earlier the same week stated that he had confidence in the director.

=== State Secretary ===
Shortly after the end of his term as mayor, he was appointed as a State Secretary in the Ministry of Petroleum and Energy. He held the position from October 2015 to June 2017, when he was replaced in a state Secretary reshuffle.

=== Minister of Petroleum and Energy ===
Freiberg was appointed minister of petroleum and energy on 31 August 2018 following a minor reshuffle after Terje Søviknes and Ketil Solvik-Olsen resigned.

In September 2018, after nearly a month in office, Freiberg wrote a debate post in iTromsø, where he expressed that he wanted the country to think long term when it came to the petroleum industry. He also stressed that the government would follow the Paris agreement closely and strengthen the competitive industry.
