= Geir Mo =

Norwegian politician (born 1966)

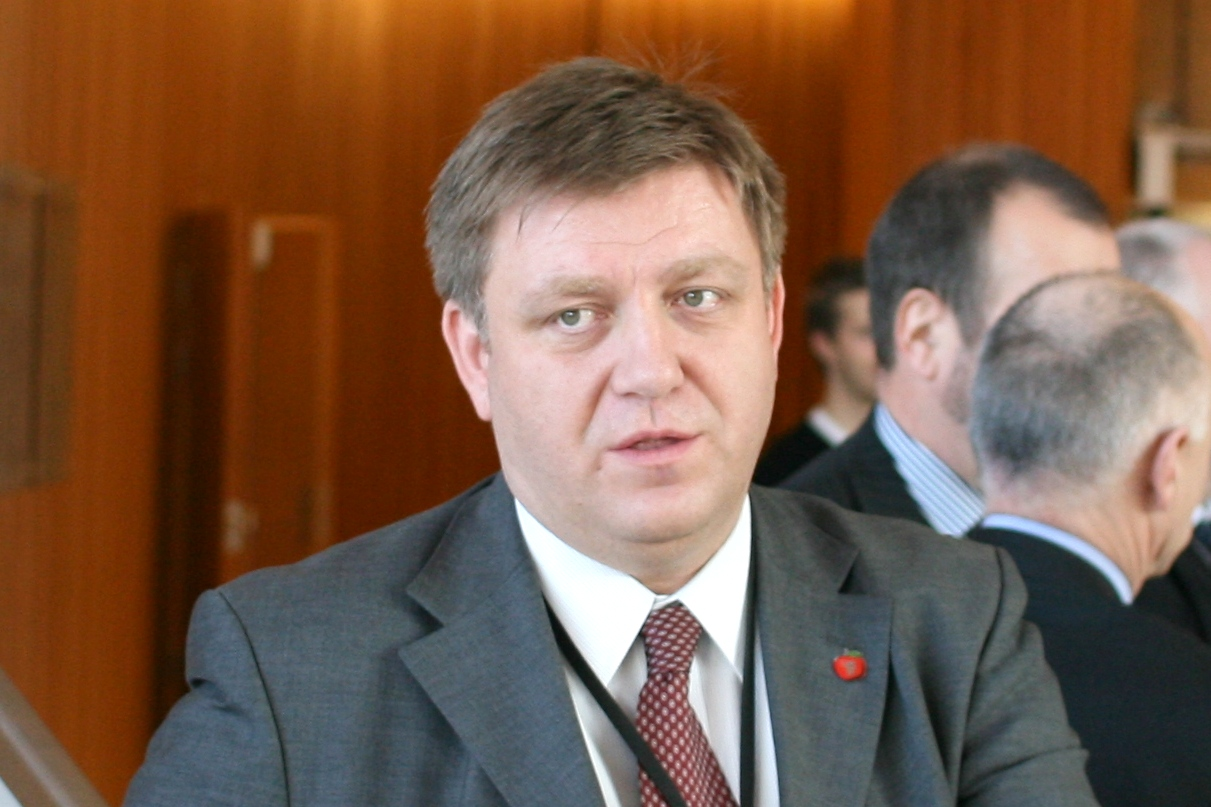
Geir Mo

Geir Andersson Mo (born 2 November 1966 in Lærdal Municipality) is a Norwegian politician for the Progress Party. He is also CEO of Energigass Norge, an organization that works to promote the increased and safe use of energy gases such as biogas, natural gas, hydrogen, and propane in Norway. After a ten-year break from active politics, he was elected leader of Akershus Progress Party (FrP) in 2023, a position he still holds.

He served as a deputy representative to the Parliament of Norway from Telemark during the term 1993–1997, but did not meet in parliamentary session. On the local level Mo was a deputy member of the municipal council of Notodden Municipality from 1991 to 1995. During the same period he was also a member of Telemark county council. In 2003 he was elected to the borough council in Østensjø, Oslo.

Mo became secretary-general of the Progress Party in 1994, stepping down in 2009 to become chief of staff for Siv Jensen. He had to reassume the position in late 2010, serving throughout 2011. Following a bout with legionella, in the spring of 2012 he also resigned as chief of staff for Siv Jensen and became CEO of Norges Lastebileier-Forbund.

Mo has also been a member of the Broadcasting Council. and a number of other public boards, councils, and committees, including the National Electoral Committee (Riksvalgstyret). He has also served as Chairman of the Board of Trygg Trafikk from 2014 to 2018, of the Norwegian Council for Road Safety (Opplysningsrådet for Vegtrafikken) from 2017 to 2021, and of OFV AS from 2021 to 2025. In 2020, he was also elected President of the Royal Automobil Club of Norway (KNA), a position he still holds. As President of KNA, he also participates in the General Assembly and other councils of the international motorsport federation FIA.

Preceded by Hans Andreas Limi	Secretary-general of the Norwegian Progress Party; 1994–2009	Succeeded by Erland Vestli
Preceded by Erland Vestli	Secretary-general of the Norwegian Progress Party; 2010–2012	Succeeded by Finn Eigil Holm
