= Jon Georg Dale =

Norwegian politician

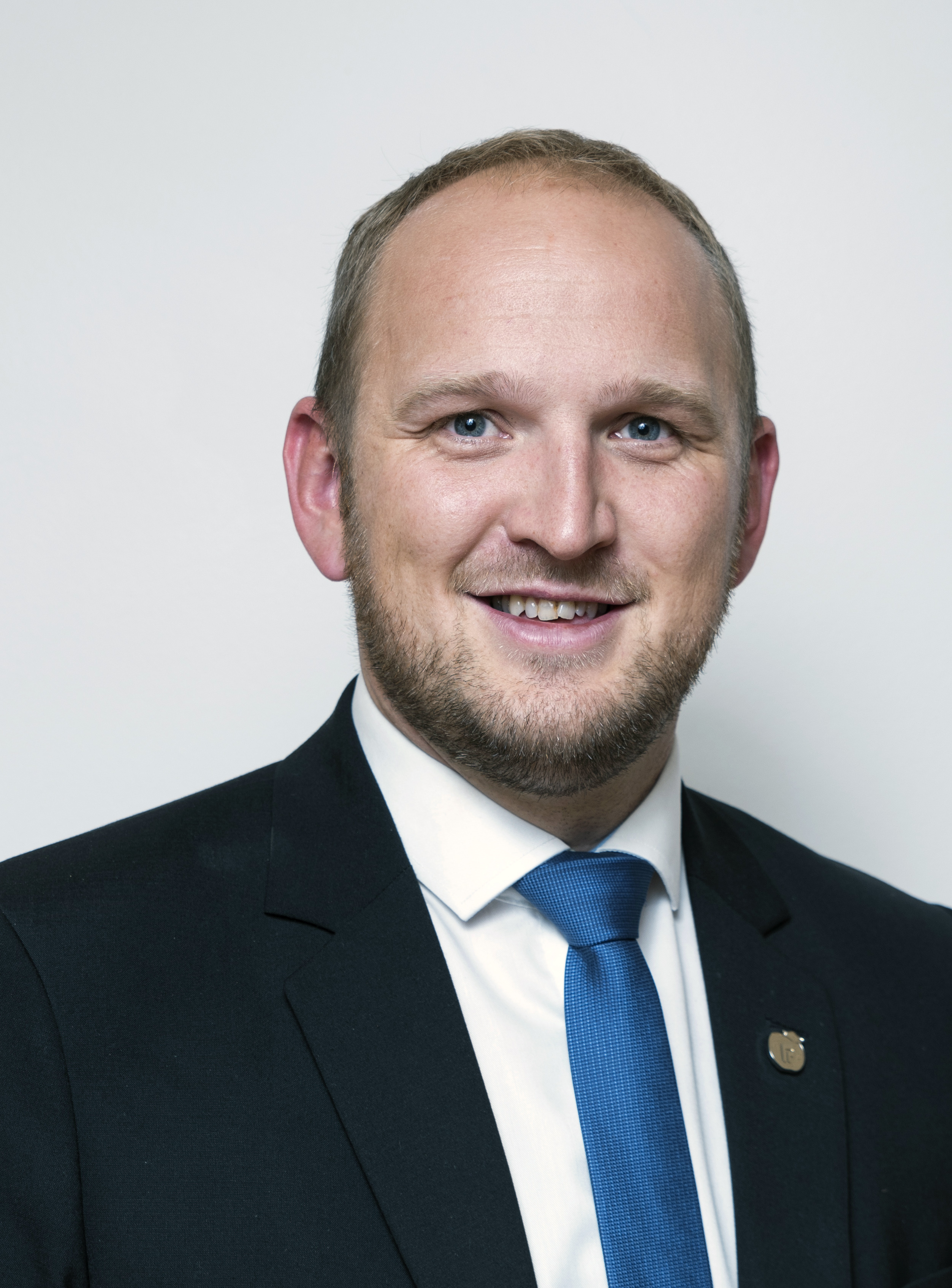

Minister of Transport and Communications
- In office 31 August 2018 – 24 January 2020
- Prime Minister: Erna Solberg
- Preceded by: Ketil Solvik-Olsen
- Succeeded by: Knut Arild Hareide

Minister of Agriculture and Food
- In office 16 December 2015 – 31 August 2018
- Prime Minister: Erna Solberg
- Preceded by: Sylvi Listhaug
- Succeeded by: Bård Hoksrud

Minister of Justice
- Acting; 15 March 2019 – 29 March 2019
- Prime Minister: Erna Solberg
- Preceded by: Tor Mikkel Wara
- Succeeded by: Jøran Kallmyr

State Secretary for the Ministry of Finance
- In office 17 October 2014 – 16 December 2015
- Prime Minister: Erna Solberg
- Minister: Siv Jensen

State Secretary for the Ministry of Transport and Communications
- In office 16 October 2013 – 17 October 2014
- Prime Minister: Erna Solberg
- Minister: Ketil Solvik-Olsen

Member of the Storting
- In office 1 October 2017 – 30 September 2021
- Deputy: Knut Magne Flølo; Jan Steinar Engeli Johansen
- Constituency: Møre og Romsdal

Deputy Member of the Storting
- In office 1 October 2009 – 30 September 2017
- Constituency: Møre og Romsdal

Personal details
- Born: 16 June 1984 (age 41) Volda Municipality, Norway
- Party: Progress

Jon Georg Dale (born 16 June 1984) is a Norwegian politician for the Progress Party. He served as Minister of Transport and Communications from 2018 to 2020 and Minister of Agriculture and Food from 2015 to 2018. He was also acting Minister of Justice for 14 days in March 2019 after Tor Mikkel Wara went on sick leave.

== Background ==
Dale has a right of inheritance to the family farm Dale near the Dalsfjorden in Volda Municipality. He is a skilled meat cutter. Outside politics, he was employed in the meat and fish industry, among others in Nortura until 2010, when he was hired as a political adviser in the Progress Party parliamentary caucus.

== Political career ==
=== Local politics ===
He served as a member of the municipal council of Volda Municipality from 2003 to 2013 and Møre og Romsdal county council from 2009 to 2011 (having previously been deputy).

=== Parliament ===
He was elected as a deputy representative to the Parliament of Norway from Møre og Romsdal during the terms 2009–2013 and 2013–2017. In total he served during 280 days of parliamentary session, until 2013 when he was appointed as a State Secretary in the Solberg's Cabinet's Ministry of Transport and Communications. He was appointed state secretary at the ministry of finance in 2014, and held said role until 2015.

On 3 July 2020, Dale announced that he would not be seeking re-election in the upcoming 2021 election. He expressed that he wanted to enter the business branch, but didn't rule out a future comeback in politics.

=== Minister of Agriculture and Food ===
Following a cabinet reshuffle on 16 December 2015, Dale was appointed minister of agriculture and food, succeeding Sylvi Listhaug, who had been appointed minister of immigration and integration.

In September 2016, Dale opened to exporting sheep meat abroad, to notably France. He also further expressed that Norwegians had to think about what they buy on a daily basis.

After presenting the government's agricultural message in December, Dale met staunch criticism from the opposition and the government's supporting parties. The opposition criticised the message for not focusing on the farmers, while the supporting parties, the Liberal Party and Christian Democrats, stated they couldn't stand behind the reduction of milk regions from nineteen to ten without anything further. Dale stated that the agricultural field had to readjust in order to increase and to streamline Norwegian food production. He also called for better climate omission reductions within agriculture, saying: "We will place greater emphasis on climate considerations in future agricultural settlements. It is not possible to produce food without emissions, but it is important to reduce the total greenhouse gas emissions from agriculture".

On 16 May 2017, Dale expressed that the farmers union organisation had little interest in reaching an agreement in the farmer's pay negotiations. The farmer's union in return accused the government of not willing to focus on agriculture as a whole and not to forward with the policies set out by the Storting. Dale argued that the end goal was not reachable within a defendable budget, and that they weren't willing to negotiate within the moderation limits. He also expressed that their demand was to high, while the government decided to stand by their offer of 410 million NOK, and for it to be approved by the Storting.

Three days after the negotiations for farmers' pay, Dale visited Balestrand to officially open the Cider House. On his way there, he was met by angry protesters, most of them farmers, who expressed they felt provoked by the government's inaction. Dale reiterated that the farmers' demand of a pay at nine percent was to high and wasn't accepted by the government. He also emphasised that Norwegian farmers still do an important job.

In October, Dale called for an end to export of meat to Afghanistan. He commented that it wasn't okay to export subsided sheep meat and disrupt the trade balance to one of the world's poorest countries. He also accused farmers' organisations of double moral, and further said that the agricultural field had to realise how unsustainable the situation was. He also said it would give less access to write out a sales tax.

In November, Dale took a stand against a local pastor, Hans Reite, from his hometown, when he made a post where he said that LGBT individuals should carry out their life and activities in secret. Dale said: "Now it was high time to counter. Both religious freedom and freedom of expression allowed Reite to go out in this way. But he can not expect no one to counter. The pastor pretends to be the spokesman for him who is also my god. My god is less prejudiced than Hans Reite's. I think it's weird when we have the same". Dale further said that Reite took the common belief in God to condemn those who chose to live differently from himself. Reite responded by saying that Dale should focus on being agriculture minister, and that he doesn't know the Bible as well as he does; and in addition that he had received a lot of support.

In April 2018, ahead of the annual farmers' pay negotiations, Dale said that the premises for the negotiations where probably the most demanding since the 1980s. He also promised to make compensation to fur farmers, despite the majority in the Storting having decided to liquidate the branch by 2024/25.

Dale managed to reach an agreement with farmers in May, thereby ending the farmers' pay negotiations. The offer was 1,1 billion NOK to stop overproduction. Dale said: "I am glad that we have now reached an agreement that follows up the priorities in the state's offer. It strengthens Norwegian food production".

In July, he was open to renegotiate the farmers' pay negotiations, but said it was dependent on a common initiative from the field itself.

In early August, Dale rejected the idea of crisis help package to farmers who were effected by sun drought that summer. He stated that it wasn't relevant at the current time, further saying: "We have to wait until we see how the crops actually turn out. We have a very good crop damage compensation scheme, and it will be further charged, but a special crisis package is not relevant at the time being". Despite the government's rejection of such a crisis package, there was a majority in the Storting in favour of it. The Centre Party's Geir Pollestad said it was provoking against farmers, and announced the opposition would front a proposal for such a package come autumn, but he expressed it might be to late for effected farmers by then.

=== Minister of Transport and Communications ===
Dale was appointed minister of transport and communications in a minor reshuffle at the end of August 2018. He succeeded Ketil Solvik-Olsen, who had resigned to join his wife in Birmingham, Alabama, where she had gotten a position at a children's hospital.

In October 2018, Dale supported the move that British Go-Ahead would take over operations on the Sørlandet line. He promised that he would follow developments carefully, and that the big changes on the Norwegian railway led to more railway for the money.

In April 2019, Dale said it would be unnecessary to ban the use of electric scooters, while acknowledging that accidents happen, but that it should not be a valid reason to ban them. Later that month, he brushed of criticism from the Centre Party in regards of his party's stance on tolls. Dale stated that the criticism was nothing new, and noted that the Centre Party supported every legislation for tolls.

In August, Dale reiterated his remarks of banning electric scooters after local politicians in Trondheim decided to strengthen regulation on their use. Local politicians in Oslo also expressed an interest in the regulation, and Dale invited the parts for a meeting. Dale also expressed that a ban and public regulation was not the right solution, and further added that the companies had to come to agreeable solutions with the municipalities. He also attacked the Green Party's criticism that it was the Progress Party in government's fault that Oslo couldn't regulate the use of electric scooters. Dale called the criticism a "completely absurd situation".

In October, Dale stated there was no promises guaranteed in regards to the construction of a double rail line between Råde Municipality and Sarpsborg Municipality on the Østfold Rail Line. Overall the government concluded that the already established plans for the rail line would not be pursued.

After the Rogfast project was put on hold in November 2019, Dale issued a press statement, encouraging that the project would be implemented, saying "E39 Rogfast is an important project to connect living and working regions in Western Norway, and will be built. The Norwegian Public Roads Administration will therefore turn every stone to find solutions that will cut costs so that the project can be implemented".

In January 2020, about four days before the Progress Party formally withdrew from Solberg's cabinet, Dale summarised the party's tenure within transport, with that they had made clear marks. Four days later, he was succeeded by Knut Arild Hareide as minister of transport and communications.

== Civic career ==
In November 2021, he joined the PR agency First House.

== Personal life ==
Dale has said he is a Christian and believes in God, while also expressing support for the LGBT community.
