= Dagfinn Henrik Olsen =

Norwegian politician

Member of the Storting
- Incumbent
- Assumed office 1 October 2021
- Constituency: Nordland

Deputy Member of the Storting
- In office 1 October 2013 – 30 September 2021
- Deputising for: Kjell-Børge Freiberg (2018–2019)
- Constituency: Nordland
- In office 1 October 1997 – 30 September 2001
- Constituency: Nordland

Personal details
- Born: 29 June 1966 (age 59)
- Party: Progress

Dagfinn Henrik Olsen (born 29 June 1966) is a Norwegian politician for the Progress Party.

He served as a deputy representative to the Parliament of Norway from Nordland during the terms 1997–2001, 2013–2017 and 2017–2021. When regular representative Kjell-Børge Freiberg became a cabinet member in August 2018, Olsen took his place as a regular. He assumed a seat in the Standing Committee on Transport and Communications. He was elected member of the Storting in 2021 and was re-elected in 2025.

Hailing from Lødingen Municipality, he had been elected on local and regional level.
