= Jan Steinar Engeli Johansen =

Norwegian politician

- Born: 12 June 1972 (age 53)
- Occupation: Politician
- Political party: Progress Party

Jan Steinar Engeli Johansen (born 12 June 1972) is a Norwegian politician.

He was elected deputy representative to the Storting from the constituency of Møre og Romsdal for the period 2017–2021 for the Progress Party. He replaced Sylvi Listhaug at the Storting from October 2017 to March 2018, thereafter Jon Georg Dale, and again Listhaug from May 2019 to January 2020.
