= Mazyar Keshvari =

Norwegian politician (born 1981)

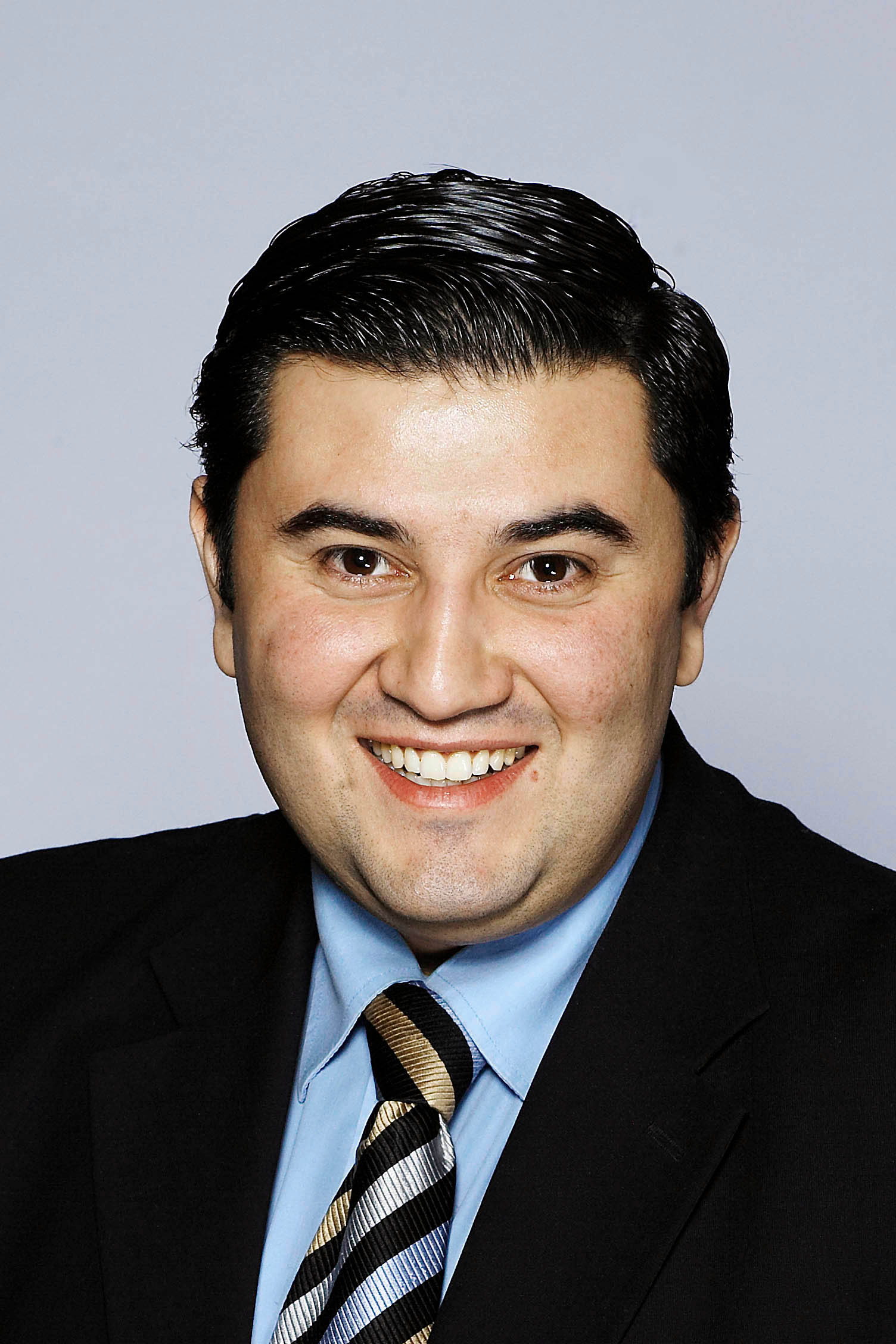
- Born: 5 March 1981 (age 45); Tehran, Iran
- Education: BI Norwegian Business School
- Political party: Progress Party (former)
- Status: Convicted
- Convictions: 25 October 2019
- Criminal charge: Serious fraud
- Penalty: Imprisonment

Deputy Member of the Storting
- In office 1 October 2005 – 30 September 2021
- Deputising for: Siv Jensen (2013–2020 (on leave from 2018 to 2020))
- Constituency: Oslo
- Website: mazyarkeshvari.com

Mazyar Keshvari (Persian: مازیار کشوری; born 5 March 1981) is an Iranian-born Norwegian former politician for the Progress Party who is serving two prison sentences for fraud and violent threats. He was elected as a substitute member of the Norwegian parliament for the city of Oslo in 2013, representing the right-wing and anti-immigration Progress Party, and attended parliamentary sessions from 2013 to 2018 as the substitute of the mandate holder Siv Jensen who has been on leave from parliament during her government service. As a politician he was known for taking a hard stance on immigration, calling for a complete ban on further immigration to Norway, a stop to the practice of accepting asylum seekers in Norway, and the deportation of immigrants convicted of crimes. In 2019 he was convicted of aggravated fraud for defrauding the Norwegian parliament and in 2020 he was sentenced to 11 months' imprisonment. He left the Norwegian parliament following his indictment in 2018 and also left the Progress Party in October 2019. In 2019 he was also arrested and charged with making violent threats, and he was convicted and sentenced to an additional four months in prison in 2020.

== Early life and education ==
Born in Tehran, Iran. Mazyar Keshvari and his family left Iran in the aftermath of the Islamic Revolution because his family had ties to the Shah, and came to Norway as an asylum seeker in 1986, eventually settling in Oslo. Upon finishing Ulsrud Upper Secondary school in 2001, he enrolled at the BI Norwegian Business School and graduated with a bachelor's degree in Information and Public Relations in 2005.

== Political career ==
He joined the Youth of the Progress Party in 2001 and quickly became a rising star, first chairing the local Groruddalen chapter and later chairing its Oslo chapter from 2004 to 2006; he is still a member of its Central committee. He has also been editor-in-chief of the political magazine Fri Kapitalisme.

He was first elected to Oslo city council in 2007, and was re-elected for another term in 2011, and is the current chairman of the Standing Committee on Health and Care Services.

Since 2005, Keshvari has been serving as a deputy representative from Oslo to the Parliament of Norway. He was re-elected to a second four-year term running to 2013. Apart from politics he sits on the board of directors at the Sunnaas Hospital, as well as being chairman of the official Constitution Day committee.

In 2013 he was elected as a deputy MP for a third term. As Siv Jensen was selected as a member of Solberg's Cabinet, Keshvari advanced to a regular representative. In 2019 he cancelled his membership in the Progress Party.

== Political views ==
=== Iran ===
He has made his mark in the Norwegian public sphere as a staunch opponent of the Iranian theocracy, often condemning the regime in the media. In June 2009 he called for tough sanctions against Iran including a complete boycott of the regime. During the 2009 Iranian election protests he described the regime as not only a threat against the Iranian people, but the entire world at large. In response to the violent crackdown on the protesters he called the Iranian leadership a "terror-regime", and compared Iran's President Mahmoud Ahmadinejad to comical Ali.

A fierce critic of the Red-green coalition's foreign policy on Iran, he states : The Norwegian government's failed policies are putting world peace in danger. By giving this islamo-fascist regime with nuclear ambitions resources and technology, they are sustaining and legitimizing its existence

=== Immigration ===
Keshvari is known taking a hard stance on immigration, calling for a complete ban on further immigration to Norway, a stop to the practice of accepting asylum seekers in Norway, and the deportation of immigrants convicted of crimes.

He has stated that immigrants who do not comply with "Norwegian values" should "beat it". He has repeatedly called for a complete ban on further immigration to Norway, stating that it is not sustainable in the long-term. Responding to government plans to open a centre for asylum-seekers on Andøya in 2008 he described the plans as "irresponsible" and "almost madness" and stated that immigration to Norway was "totally out of control".

Outspoken against what he perceives as progressive ethnic segregation of Oslo neighborhoods, Keshvari has repeatedly accused fellow politicians who reside in Oslo's largely homogeneous west-end of having "elitist-attitudes" when praising the situation. Especially he targeted the Conservative Party's Julie Brodtkorb who he believed had "elitist-syndrome".

In response to public outcry over the establishment of roma tent encampments in the center of Oslo during the summer of 2012, Keshvari demanded their "immediate expulsion" along with the forced closure of such camps, while reiterating the need for a total ban on public begging, but at the same he warned politicians against inflaming already high anti-roma sentiment in the city.

He also opposes female genital mutilation.

=== Animal rights ===
Keshvari has advocated a rich and diverse wildlife in and around Oslo. He has opposed calls from the Centre Party for the culling of the grey wolf population in the østmarka woods outside Oslo.

== Controversy ==
In 2014 Keshvari was accused of making death threats against NRK debate moderator Ingunn Solheim in an Oslo pub. Keshvari maintained that the comments were made in jest, and NRK decided against filing charges.

In 2018 Aftenposten revealed that Keshvari had received several reimbursements of travel expenses for trips that he could not possibly have made. Keshvari admitted to defrauding the Storting, and declared that he wanted to make amends and pay back the reimbursements. In October 2019, he canceled his membership in the Progress Party and he was sentenced to seven months' imprisonment for gross fraud.

In February 2019, Keshvari was arrested for making "serious threats" involving a firearm. He has denied any wrongdoing.

== Personal life ==
He lives in the Oslo suburb of Ellingsrud. He is also a patron of fine arts including paintings, and especially the works of Edvard Munch, replicas of which adorned his former office at Oslo City Hall.
