= Terje Søviknes =

Norwegian politician

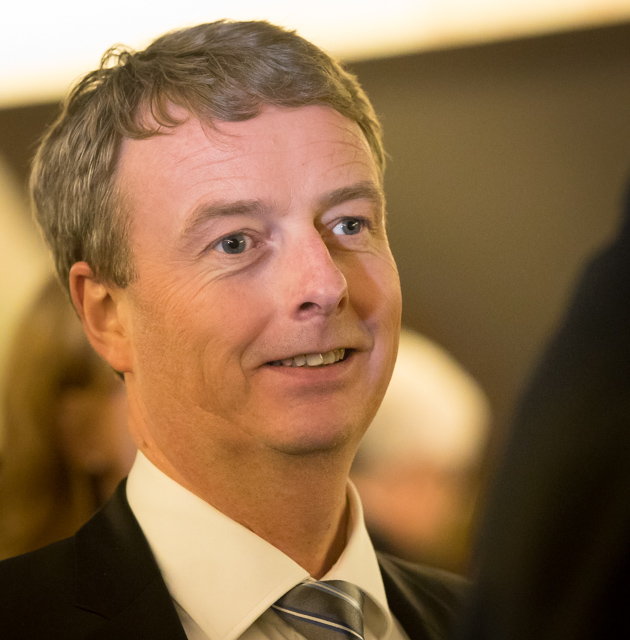

Mayor of Bjørnafjorden Municipality
- Incumbent
- Assumed office 19 October 2023
- Deputy: Marie Lunde Bruraøy
- Preceded by: Trine Lindborg

Minister of the Elderly and Public Health
- In office 18 December 2019 – 24 January 2020
- Prime Minister: Erna Solberg
- Preceded by: Sylvi Listhaug
- Succeeded by: Position abolished

Minister of Petroleum and Energy
- In office 20 December 2016 – 31 August 2018
- Prime Minister: Erna Solberg
- Preceded by: Tord Lien
- Succeeded by: Kjell-Børge Freiberg

Mayor of Os Municipality
- In office 1 September 2018 – 29 October 2019
- Deputy: Marie Lunde Bruarøy
- Preceded by: Marie Lunde Bruraøy
- Succeeded by: Position abolished
- In office October 1999 – 20 December 2016
- Deputy: Lisbeth Lunde Axelsen; Børge Lunde; Marie Lunde Bruarøy
- Preceded by: Geirmund Dyrdal
- Succeeded by: Marie Lunde Bruraøy

Second Deputy Leader of the Progress Party
- Incumbent
- Assumed office 5 May 2019
- Leader: Siv Jensen; Sylvi Listhaug
- Preceded by: Ketil Solvik-Olsen
- In office 2 May 1999 – 12 February 2001
- Leader: Carl I. Hagen
- Preceded by: Vidar Kleppe
- Succeeded by: John Alvheim

Personal details
- Born: 28 February 1969 (age 57) Os Municipality, Norway
- Party: Progress
- Spouse: Janniche Askeland (m. 1998; div. 2011)
- Children: 2
- Education: Bergen University College; Norwegian School of Economics

Terje Søviknes (born 28 February 1969) is a Norwegian politician for the Progress Party who has served as the mayor of Bjørnafjorden Municipality since 2023. He previously served as minister of petroleum and energy from December 2016 to August 2018. From December 2019 to January 2020 he was the minister of the elderly and public health. He also serves as the party's second deputy leader since 2019, a post he previously held from 1999 to 2001.

Søviknes was the first politician of his party to become mayor of a Norwegian municipality, namely Os Municipality in 1999, and one of the longest-serving, retaining the position for five consecutive elections until his 2016 government appointment.

== Early life and education ==
Søviknes was born in Os Municipality, Norway to metalworker and fisherman Eirik Søviknes (born 1939) and store clerk Gunn Drange (born 1942). He grew up on Søvikneset in Lysefjorden. He attended Os Senior high school from 1985 to 1988. He earned a degree in marine engineering from Bergen College of Engineering in 1992, and later studied at the Norwegian School of Economics.

== Political career ==
=== Early career and sex scandal ===
From 1999 to 2001, Søviknes was the second deputy leader of the Progress Party together with Siv Jensen, and was considered as a possible successor to Carl I. Hagen as leader of the party. He however became controversial after an incident at a party congress in 2001 where he had sexually abused a 16-year-old intoxicated member of the Youth of the Progress Party. Søviknes retained his position as mayor of Os (since 1999) and did not lose his local support after the incident.

=== Mayor of Os ===
After first being elected mayor of Os Municipality following the 1999 local elections, his local party's support subsequently surged from 36.6 to 45.7% (the highest share of votes for the party in a municipality for the election) in the 2003 local elections. The success was repeated in the 2007 local elections when he was reelected by a landslide. The candidate from the Conservative Party who came in second, jokingly commented that "You don't challenge Terje Søviknes in Os." He was yet again reelected in the 2011 local elections, this time however by a far lesser margin. This led to speculation that he could be ousted from power by a coalition of the other parties. Søviknes remained in power with the support of the Conservative Party. He won a fifth term at the 2015 local elections with 39.5% of the vote. With Os Municipality being merged with the neighbouring Fusa Municipality, Søviknes led his local party into the 2019 local elections, securing 32% of the vote in the new Bjørnafjorden Municipality. Despite this, the Labour Party secured a majority with the Centre Party, with Trine Lindborg ultimately becoming mayor.

Os has since been seen, both by Søviknes and the media, as a showcase municipality for the Progress Party. This designation stems from his first term as mayor, during which he achieved full kindergarten and nursing home coverage and initiated a health and wellness travel program to Spain and similar destinations. During this period, local policy aimed to restrict immigration, and a local Vinmonopol store was opened. After winning re-election for the 2003-2007 term, the key priorities for his administration included the development of Osøyro, improved drug addiction recovery programs, development of schools and the construction of a waterpark. Although the municipality faced substantial budget deficits before Søviknes took office, it had achieved a significant surplus by 2004. His tenure as mayor of Os earned him the media nickname the "Wizard of Os".

=== Minister of Petroleum and Energy ===
On 20 December 2016, Søviknes was appointed Minister of Petroleum and Energy in the Solberg Cabinet, succeeding fellow party member Tord Lien.

In October 2017, he was found to have misinformed the Storting about a controversial petroleum project's finalisation date. The project was scheduled to be finished in 2022, three years after what Søviknes had previously stated.

During his tenure, the government approved for Norway to join the European Union Agency for the Cooperation of Energy Regulators or Acer in 2018. This faced heavy opposition from people against the EU, even escalating to Søviknes receiving death threats.

He resigned in late August 2018 citing family reasons, and instead returned to become mayor of Os Municipality, a position he held for a year until Os Municipality was merged with Fusa Municipality to become Bjørnafjorden Municipality in 2020.

=== Minister of the Elderly and Public Health ===
In December 2019, Erna Solberg commenced a reshuffle where she appointed Søviknes to become Minister of the Elderly and Public Health succeeding fellow party member Sylvi Listhaug, who had been appointed as Minister of Petroleum and Energy. Like Listhaug, his term was cut short after a month when the Progress Party withdrew from the government, citing conflict within the government about bringing an ISIS associated woman and her sick children home.

=== Second term as deputy leader ===
Søviknes was re-elected as the party's second deputy leader at the party congress on 5 May 2019, succeeding Ketil Solvik-Olsen who didn't stand for re-election citing family reasons. In 2021, following Siv Jensen's announced departure as party leader, Søviknes said he was open to continue as second deputy leader if Listhaug was elected her successor. Listhaug was subsequently elected party leader at the party convention, with Ketil Solvik-Olsen as first deputy leader, while Søviknes was re-elected as second deputy.

=== Mayor of Bjørnafjorden ===
He was the Bjørnafjorden Progress Party's mayoral candidate in the 2023 local elections. His party became the largest party and soon after announced that they would be working with the Conservatives for the next council term, and that he would become mayor and the Conservatives' Marie Bruarøy deputy mayor. Both officially assumed office on 19 October.

In December 2023, he acknowledged that he had been storing 30 lobsters beyond the peacetime deadline of 1 December, which the Norwegian Directorate of Fisheries uncovered during an inspection of his dock on 4 December.

== Personal life ==
Søviknes married Janniche Askeland in 1998 and they have two children together. In October 2011 they announced that they were separating. Søviknes is an avid bridge (card game) enthusiast and former president of the Os Bridge Club.

=== Awards ===
- Zero Emission Resource Organisation's Local climate measure of the year: 2011
- Norwegian Lifesaving Society's Badge of Honour: 1993

Political offices
Preceded by Sylvi Listhaug	Minister of the Elderly and Public Health; 2019–2020	Position abolished
Preceded by Tord Lien	Minister of Petroleum and Energy; 2016–2018	Succeeded by Kjell-Børge Freiberg
Party political offices
Preceded by Ketil Solvik-Olsen	Second Deputy Leader of the Progress Party; 2019–present	Incumbent
Preceded by Vidar Kleppe	Second Deputy Leader of the Progress Party; 1999–2001	Succeeded by John Alvheim
Civic offices
Preceded by Trine Lindborg	Mayor of Bjørnafjorden Municipality; 2023–present	Incumbent
Preceded by Marie Lunde Bruraøy	Mayor of Os Municipality; 2018–2019	Position abolished
Preceded by Geirmund Dyrdal	Mayor of Os Municipality; 1999–2016	Succeeded by Marie Lunde Bruraøy
