= Hans Andreas Limi =

Norwegian businessperson and politician

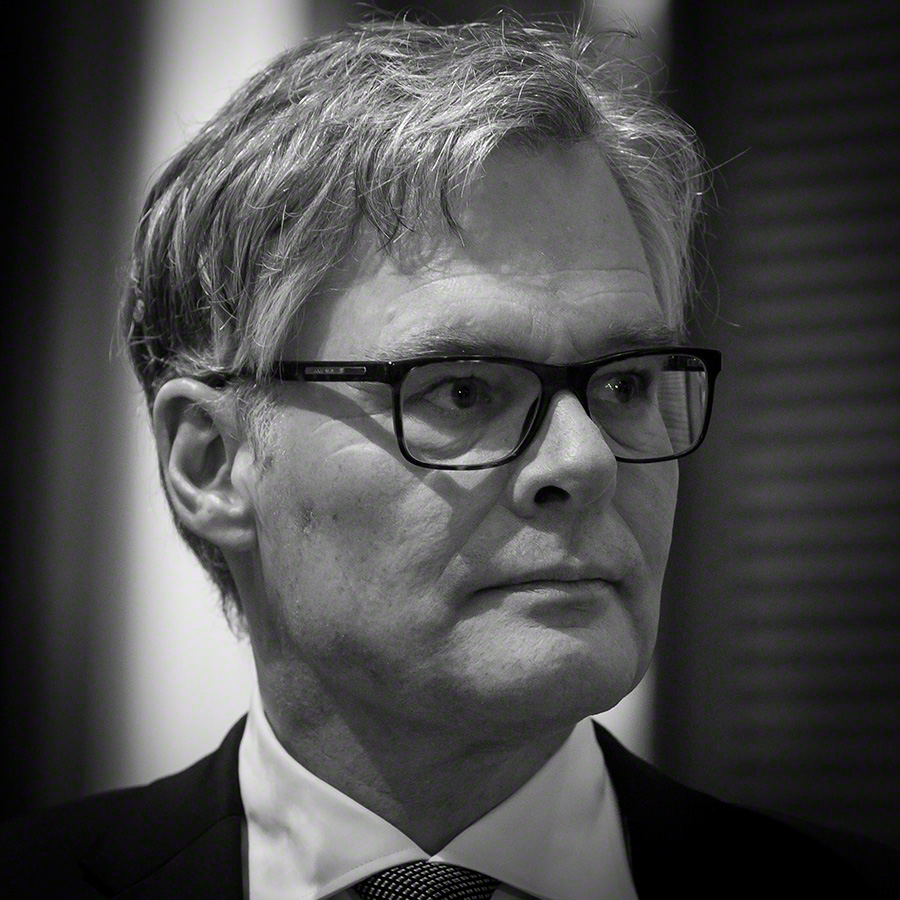
- Limi in 2016

First Deputy Leader of the Progress Party
- Incumbent
- Assumed office 30 April 2023
- Leader: Sylvi Listhaug
- Preceded by: Ketil Solvik-Olsen

Parliamentary Leader for the Progress Party
- In office 2 October 2017 – 27 January 2020
- Leader: Siv Jensen
- Preceded by: Harald T. Nesvik
- Succeeded by: Siv Jensen

Member of the Storting
- Incumbent
- Assumed office 1 October 2013
- Constituency: Akershus

Oslo City Commissioner for Finance and Planning
- In office 24 April 1991 – 1 January 1992
- Governing Mayor: Michael Tetzschner
- Preceded by: Sverre Frich jr.
- Succeeded by: Rune Bjerke

General Secretary of the Progress Party
- In office 1988 – May 1994
- Leader: Carl I. Hagen
- Preceded by: Position established
- Succeeded by: Geir Mo

Personal details
- Born: 26 September 1960 (age 65) Skien, Telemark, Norway
- Political party: Progress
- Spouse: Vibeke Limi (m. 1984)
- Children: 3

Hans Andreas Limi (born 26 September 1960) is a Norwegian businessperson and politician for the Progress Party. He is currently an MP for the Akershus constituency since 2013 and the party's first deputy leader since 2023. He previously served as the party's parliamentary leader from 2017 to 2020.

== Career ==
=== Party politics ===
Limi was the secretary-general in the Youth of the Progress Party from 1984 to 1986. He was then an office manager in the Progress Party from 1986 to 1988 and then secretary-general until May 1994. He then withdrew, shortly after the 1994 Progress Party national convention.

He was the party's parliamentary leader from 2017 to 2020.

In March 2023, he announced his candidacy for the deputy leadership, succeeding retiring Ketil Solvik-Olsen. He was endorsed by the party county chapters of Viken, Oslo, Rogaland, Innlandet and Vestland, in addition to the Progress Party's Youth. Limi was formally elected at the party convention on 30 April.

=== Local politics ===
Limi was a member of the executive committee of Skien city council (his home town) from 1983 to 1987. In the 1987 Norwegian local elections he was elected to Oslo city council, but he took leave from his position in 1989. He became city commissioner of finance in Oslo when he took over after Sverre Frich, Jr. in April 1991, and sat throughout the year.

In 2011, he made a political comeback as he was elected to the Bærum municipal council.

=== Parliament ===
In 2013, he was elected to the Storting from the Akershus constituency. He was re-elected in 2017 and 2021.

In parliament, he is currently a member of the Standing Committee on Finance and the Preparatory Credentials Committee since 2021. He was previously a member of the Election Committee in 2017 and served as its second vice chair from 2017 to 2020. He sat on the Standing Committee on Finance from 2013 to 2017 and again from 2020 to 2021. He further sat on the Standing Committee on Foreign Affairs and Defence from 2017 to 2020 and concurrently the Enlarged Committee on Foreign Affairs and Defence. He was also the second vice chair of the Standing Committee on Finance from May to September 2021.

=== Outside politics ===
Limi was hired as property manager in the Olav Thon Group. He was later a development director in Steen & Strøm and from 2005 director in ICA Norway.

Limi has been a member of the Broadcasting Council.

== Personal life ==
He is married to party colleague Vibeke Limi. The couple has three children.

Party political offices
Preceded by position created	Secretary-general of the Progress Party; 1988–1994	Succeeded by Geir Mo
Preceded by Harald T. Nesvik	Parliamentary Leader of the Progress Party; 2017–2020	Succeeded by Siv Jensen
Preceded by Ketil Solvik-Olsen	First Deputy Leader of the Progress Party; 2023–present	Incumbent
Political offices
Preceded by Sverre Frich, Jr.	Oslo City Commissioner of Finance and Planning; 1991–1992	Succeeded by Rune Bjerke
