= Knut Magne Flølo =

Norwegian politician

- Born: 18 November 1949 (age 76); Vestnes Municipality, Norway
- Occupation: Politician
- Political party: Progress Party

Knut Magne Flølo (born 18 November 1949) is a Norwegian politician.

He was elected deputy representative to the Storting from the constituency of Møre og Romsdal for the period of 2017–2021 for the Progress Party. He replaced Jon Georg Dale in the Storting from October 2017 to March 2018 and from May 2019 to January 2020. He has served as mayor of Vestnes Municipality.

== Personal life ==
Flølo was born in Vestnes Municipality on 18 November 1949, and is educated as electrician.
