= Åse Michaelsen =

Norwegian politician (born 1960)

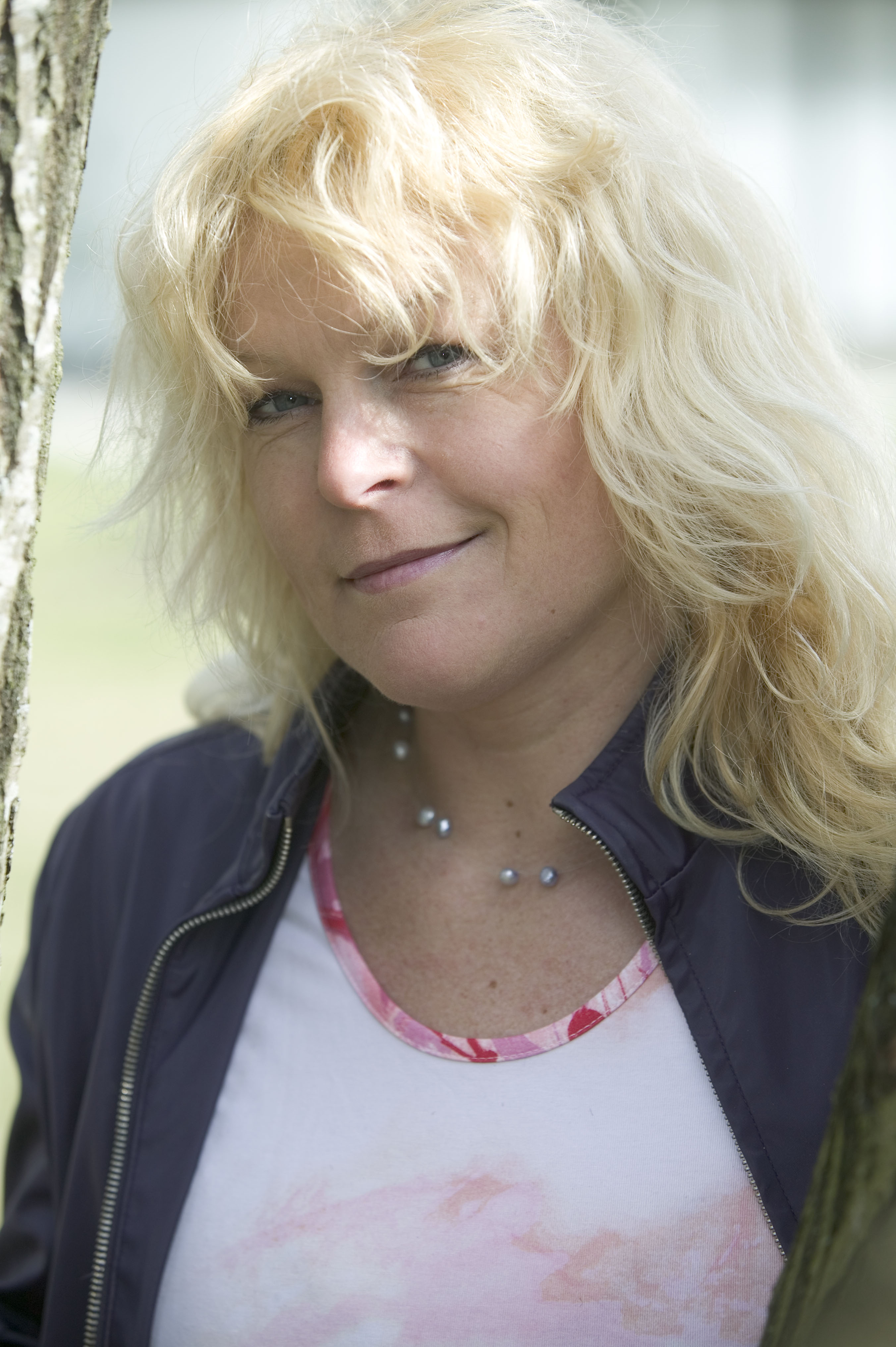

Minister of the Elderly and Public Health
- In office 17 January 2018 – 3 May 2019
- Prime Minister: Erna Solberg
- Preceded by: Position established
- Succeeded by: Sylvi Listhaug

Member of the Norwegian Parliament
- In office 1 October 2005 – 30 September 2017
- Constituency: Vest-Agder

Personal details
- Born: 4 June 1960 (age 65) Mandal, Norway
- Party: Progress Party

Åse Michaelsen (born 4 June 1960 in Mandal) is a Norwegian politician representing the Progress Party. She served as a representative of Vest-Agder in the Storting and was first elected in 2005. She was also the Minister of Elderly and Public Health from 2018 to 2019.

== Storting committees ==
- 2005–2009 member of the Church, Education and Research committee.
- 2005–2009 member of the Electoral committee.
- 2005–2009 vice secretary of the Lagting.
