= Sylvi Listhaug =

Norwegian politician (born 1977)

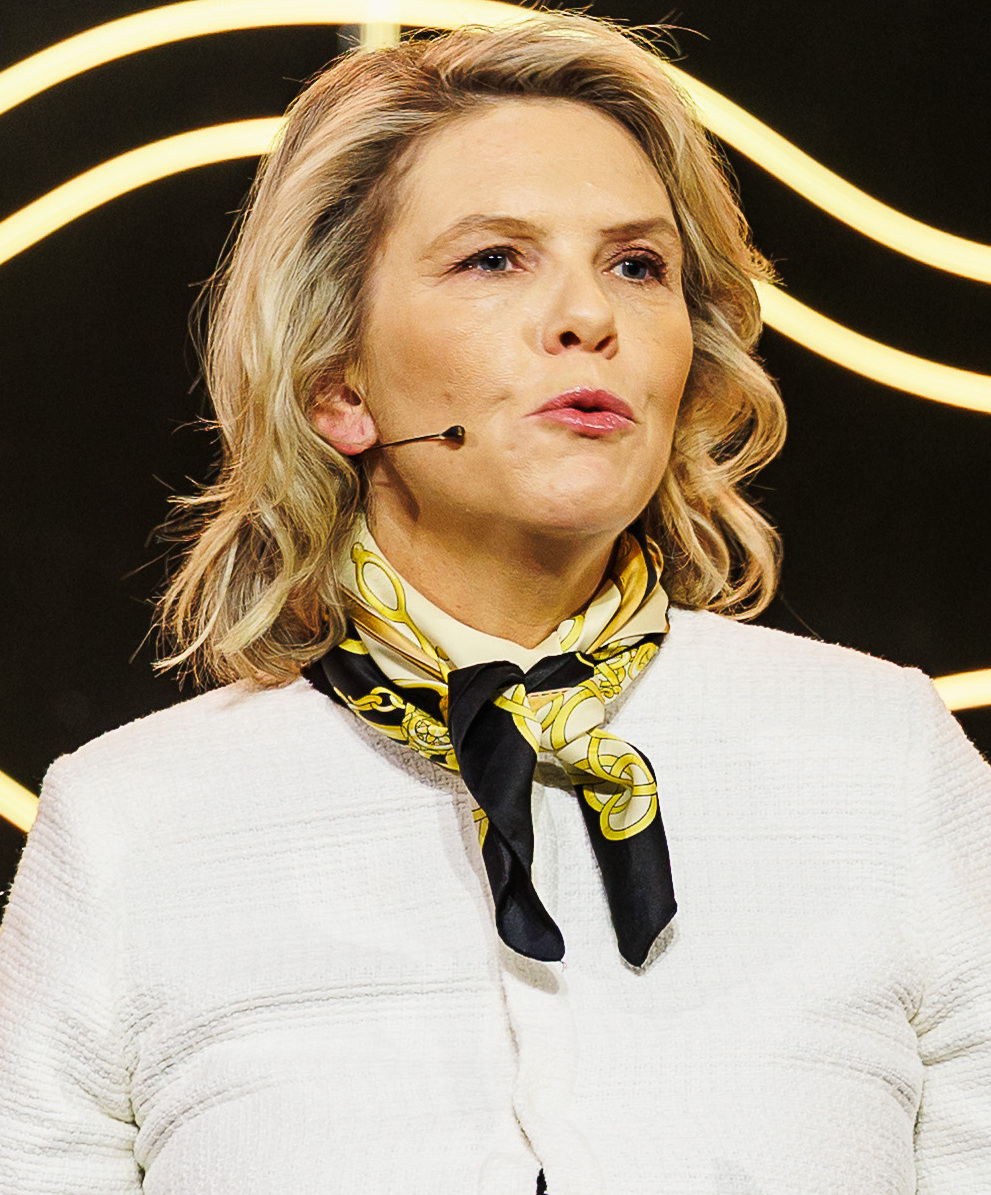
- Listhaug in 2025

Leader of the Opposition
- Incumbent
- Assumed office 1 October 2025
- Monarchs: Harald V Haakon VIII
- Prime Minister: Jonas Gahr Støre
- Preceded by: Erna Solberg
Ministerial positions
Minister of Petroleum and Energy
In office 18 December 2019 – 24 January 2020
Prime Minister	Erna Solberg
Preceded by	Kjell-Børge Freiberg
Succeeded by	Tina Bru
Minister of the Elderly and Public Health
In office 3 May 2019 – 18 December 2019
Prime Minister	Erna Solberg
Preceded by	Åse Michaelsen
Succeeded by	Terje Søviknes
Minister of Justice, Public Security and Immigration
In office 17 January 2018 – 20 March 2018
Prime Minister	Erna Solberg
Preceded by	Per-Willy Amundsen
Succeeded by	Tor Mikkel Wara
Minister of Immigration and Integration
In office 16 December 2015 – 17 January 2018
Prime Minister	Erna Solberg
Preceded by	Office created
Succeeded by	Herself as Minister of Justice, Public Security and Immigration
Minister of Agriculture and Food
In office 16 October 2013 – 16 December 2015
Prime Minister	Erna Solberg
Preceded by	Trygve Slagsvold Vedum
Succeeded by	Jon Georg Dale

Leader of the Progress Party
- Incumbent
- Assumed office 8 May 2021
- First Deputy: Ketil Solvik-Olsen; Hans Andreas Limi
- Second Deputy: Terje Søviknes
- Preceded by: Siv Jensen

Member of the Norwegian Parliament
- Incumbent
- Assumed office 1 October 2017
- Deputy: Jan Steinar Engeli Johansen
- Constituency: Møre og Romsdal

Personal details
- Born: 25 December 1977 (age 48) Ørskog Municipality, Møre og Romsdal, Norway
- Party: Progress
- Spouse: Espen Espeset
- Children: 3
- Education: Volda University College

Sylvi Listhaug (born 25 December 1977) is a Norwegian politician who has been the Leader of the Opposition since 2025 and leader of the Progress Party since 2021.

Listhaug previously served in several cabinet positions under Prime Minister Erna Solberg, last in brief stints as Minister of the Elderly and Public Health and Minister of Petroleum and Energy between 2019 and 2020. Before that, , and Minister of Agriculture and Food from 2013 to 2015, she served as Minister of Immigration and Integration from 2015 to 2018. Her term as Minister of Immigration and Integration saw the number of asylum seekers arriving in Norway reduced from 30,000 in 2015 to 2,000 in 2017. She briefly served as Minister of Justice, Public Security and Immigration in 2018.

Originally from the rural Ørskog Municipality in Sunnmøre, Listhaug began her political career in Oslo as City Commissioner of Welfare and Social Services. She is currently serving as a member of the Storting and the Standing Committee on Health and Care Services.

== Early life and education ==
Listhaug was born in Ålesund. She was raised on the family farm in Ørskog Municipality in Møre og Romsdal, to which she has odelsrett. Her father worked with transportation, while her mother ran the family farm. She has two twin siblings.

In 1995, Listhaug began to work as a care assistant at the local home for the elderly in Ørskog Municipality, and from 1996 to 2000, she studied history, social sciences, and special education at the Volda University College. In 2000, she graduated and qualified as a teacher, and from 2000 to 2001, worked as a teacher at the Sjøholt school in Ørskog.

== Political career ==
=== Early career and parliament ===
Listhaug began her political involvement locally in Ørskog. She has held several positions within the Progress Party and its youth organisation Progress Party's Youth since 1998, and has been a member of the Progress Party central board since 2005. She worked as political advisor and aide to the Progress Party's parliamentary group from 2001 to 2004. In 2005, she had a stay abroad as an intern in the United States House of Representatives. She has been a deputy representative in the Norwegian parliament from Møre og Romsdal (2001 to 2009), and from Oslo (2009 to 2013), with a total 95 days of parliamentary session served. She was elected as a parliamentary representative for the first time in 2017 (from Møre og Romsdal).

=== Oslo city commissioner ===
Listhaug was appointed city commissioner (byråd) of welfare and social services in the city government of Oslo in 2006, having been secretary to the previous commissioner Margaret Eckbo. Listhaug spearheaded a number of reforms as commissioner, introducing free choice in home care, and reintroducing senior homes in her first year. She stated as her goals more competition and better nursing homes, and opening for more private companies.

In 2009 she became the subject of a nursing home funding scandal, after it was revealed that a company that had been granted a total amount of 23,5 million NOK from Oslo municipality to build nursing homes for Norwegians in Altea, Spain had not yet even been granted a Spanish construction permit. Listhaug claimed she was not responsible for the plans, which were designed to make Oslo a prime example for other municipalities in regards to care for the elderly. Listhaug told reporters from the state broadcaster NRK in March 2010 that she did "not have the responsibility for the construction of the nursing home nor authoring the contracts".

Other proposals by Listhaug as city commissioner included a stricter policy on psychiatric patients, and putting up posters of convicted rapists in their local community. Before the gay parade in Oslo in 2009, Listhaug suggested to some controversy that "half and almost wholly naked people dancing around in the streets of Oslo" could rather lead to less tolerance of homosexuals, thus working against its goal, although she made clear that homosexuals should be able to party "when and where they want".

=== Political consultant ===
From 2012 until her cabinet appointment, Listhaug had worked as a senior consultant with First House, a Norwegian strategic advisory, corporate communications, governmental affairs and crisis management/issue management agency. Shortly after her appointment, media attention centered on her decision to keep secret her list of clients during her time in the job. The list of public clients was made public in early 2014 after Listhaug herself declared a personal conflict of interest.

=== Minister of Agriculture (2013–15) ===
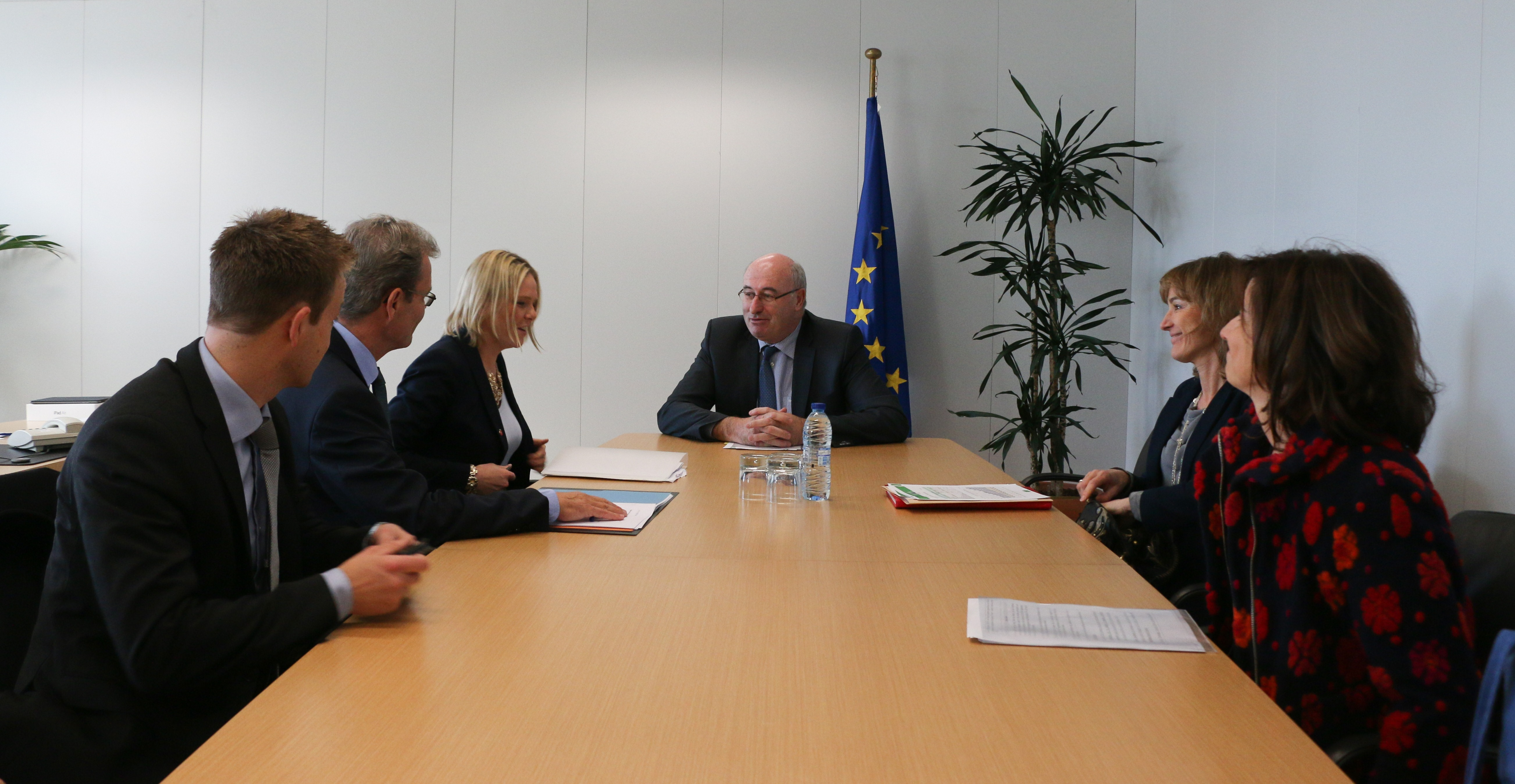
Listhaug during a meeting with Phil Hogan, the European Commissioner for Agriculture and Rural Development.

On 16 October 2013, Listhaug was appointed Minister of Agriculture and Food in the new Solberg Cabinet. The Solberg government signalled a drastic change of course in Norwegian agricultural policy by opening for more freely sale and purchase of farms, and seeking a development towards more sustainable fewer and bigger farms. Listhaug as Minister of Agriculture sought to remove laws which require farm-owners to live on the farm. Listhaug argued her changes would lead to a more efficient food production in Norway, ultimately reducing high food prices. She also lowered government subsidies to farmers, who receive one of the highest government subsidies in the world, according to the OECD.

As Listhaug in 2010 had called the Norwegian agricultural policy a "communist system" in an op-ed, this received widespread attention in media and social media. After being pressured with the comment in a television debate, she stated her intent on following the new government's policy agreement. Prior comments by Listhaug and the new government's course was met with scepticism and protest among some farmers.

During her time as Minister of Agriculture and Food, Listhaug had, somewhat controversially, contacts with clients of First House, including the farmers' organization Norges Bondelaget, the NHO employers' organization unit representing food and beverage firm, the brewing organization Bryggeriforeningen, and supermarket chain Rema 1000, one of her last clients for First House before she joined the government herself.

=== Minister of Immigration (2015–18) ===
On 16 December 2015, Listhaug was appointed Minister of Immigration and Integration, a newly formed cabinet position under the Ministry of Justice and Public Security, amid the European migrant crisis and record-high numbers of asylum seekers in Norway that resulted in a broad parliamentary agreement to tighten asylum regulations. The month prior to her appointment Listhaug criticised what she described as a "tyranny of goodness" haunting the Norwegian immigration debate, and that it would be more Christian and reasonable to help as many people as possible through foreign aid to refugees abroad rather than aiding fewer and more costly asylum seekers in Norway. She later vowed that her proposed asylum regulations would make Norway's asylum policies "one of the strictest in Europe".

In August 2017, a row took place between Listhaug and Sweden's political establishment after Listhaug planned a visit to the Swedish suburb of Rinkeby in the context of the country's vulnerable areas, having warned during her time as minister about the need to avoid "Swedish conditions" in Norway. Although meeting with other Swedish officials, Sweden's Minister for Migration Heléne Fritzon cancelled her scheduled meeting with Listhaug, saying she would not be part of an "election campaign" in the run-up to the Norwegian parliamentary election in September.

=== Minister of Justice (2018) ===
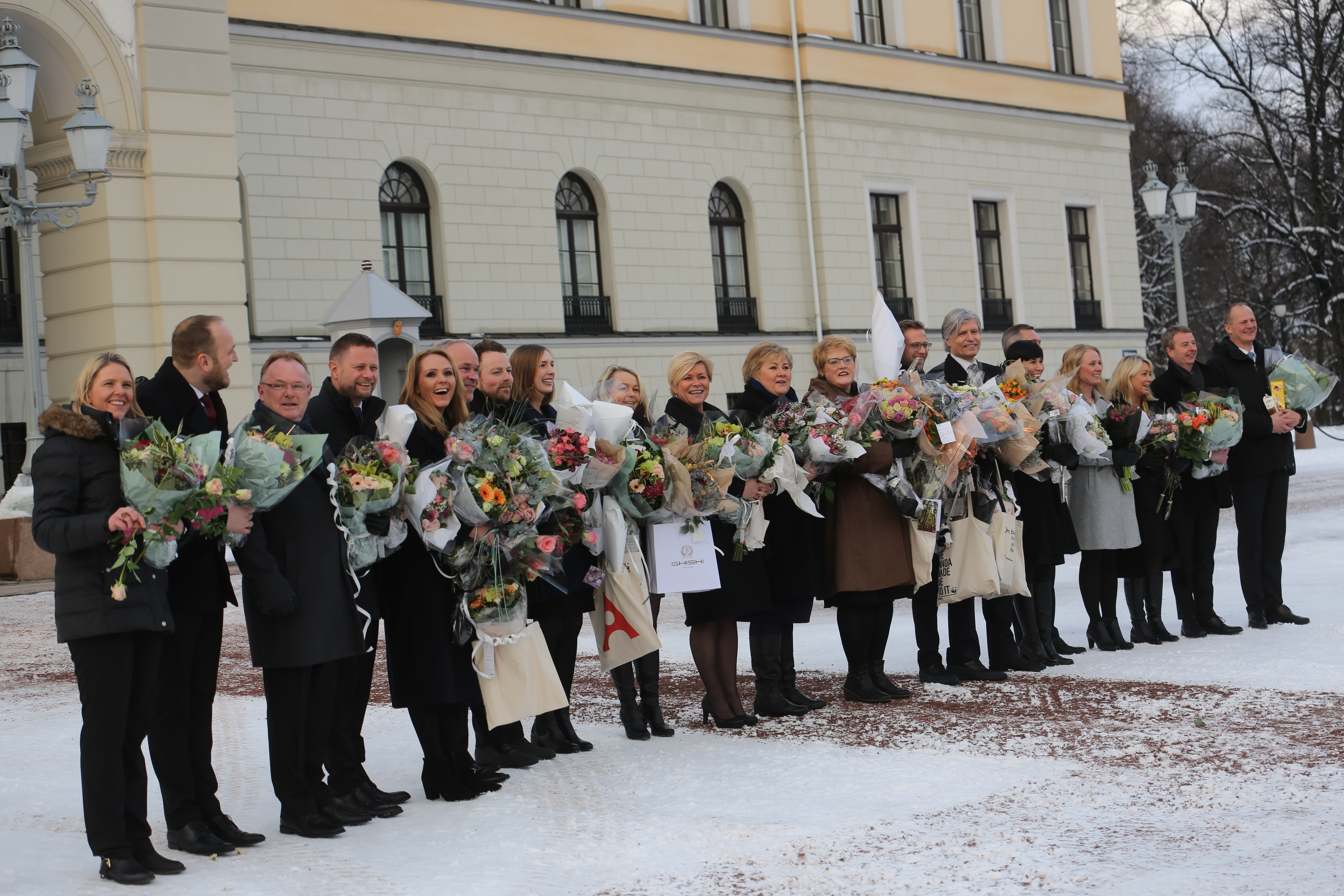
Sylvi Listhaug and the Solberg Cabinet presented after change of ministers.

After securing renewed support for the centre-right coalition in the 2017 parliamentary election, Listhaug was appointed Minister of Justice, Public Security and Immigration in January 2018, absorbing her former cabinet position following a government re-shuffle.

In March 2018, Listhaug posted a Facebook message claiming that the Labour Party "cares more about the rights of terrorists than national security" following disagreement on a parliamentary vote about whether the state should be able to withdraw the citizenship of threats to national security. After insisting for several days amid criticism that no apology was warranted other than stating regret if offending anyone, the government led by Prime Minister Solberg, and eventually Listhaug herself apologised for the post in parliament. As Listhaug's initial apology was considered "not good enough" by Labour leader Jonas Gahr Støre, this caused the opposition, including Labour and the Centre Party to state their support for a motion of no confidence pushed by the Red Party. The day before the vote on 20 March, the Christian Democrats also concluded they would support the motion, thereby indicating a parliamentary majority for the motion of no confidence. Listhaug resigned herself in the morning before the parliamentary session.

One opinion poll also briefly showed a doubling of voter support for the party. The new party members were seen by political scientists to make up a new power-base for Listhaug within the party.

=== First deputy leader (2018–21) ===
In June 2018, Sylvi Listhaug was nominated by Møre og Romsdal Progress Party as a candidate for first deputy leader of the Progress Party. The party's annual national meeting will constitute a new deputy leader on 3 September 2018, in order to replace Per Sandberg. State broadcaster NRK reported in August 2018 that Listhaug likely will be elected by the central board. Listhaug told reporters in Arendal: "I am humbled and honored to be mentioned as a deputy leader candidate", and added "I am ready to serve if the party wants me in such a role".

On 3 September 2018, the Progress Party's Central Board unanimously voted to constitute Listhaug as acting first deputy leader of the party. The formal election took take place during the party's national convention in May 2019.

=== Minister of the Elderly and Public Health (2019) ===
Sylvi Listhaug was appointed Minister for the elderly and public health on 3 May 2019 in Erna Solberg's coalition government. She was minister in the Ministry of Health and Care Services alongside Health Minister Bent Høie.

On 6 May 2019, she sparred controversy when she, newly appointed as the new health minister, told reporters from NRK: "People should be allowed to smoke, drink and eat as much red meat as much as they want. The authorities may like to inform, but people know pretty much what is healthy and what is not healthy, I think". The secretary general of the Norwegian Cancer Society, Anne Lise Ryel, said Listhaug's comments were "potentially harmful to public health".

=== Minister of Petroleum and Energy (2019–20) ===
On 18 December 2019, Listhaug assumed office as the Minister of Petroleum and Energy. In January 2020, she and the rest of Progress Party ministers withdrew from the government after a dispute over the return of an IS woman and her children. Listhaug was subsequently replaced by Tina Bru on 24 January when her party had formally left the government, and returned to opposition. Her tenure as Minister of Petroleum and Energy is the shortest in Norwegian history since Grete Faremo in 1996.

=== Party leader (2021–present) ===
Following Siv Jensen's resignation as party leader, the party designated Listhaug as their leader. She had previously accepted to become leader shortly after Jensen's resignation, and was officially elected at the party conference in May. She was elected party leader at the party convention on 8 May 2021, with Ketil Solvik-Olsen and Terje Søviknes as first and second deputy leaders respectively.

Listhaug led her party into the 2021 election, campaigning for increased petroleum activity and against the left's environmental policies. Her party ended up losing 6 seats in the Storting, decreasing their seat count to 21. In the 2025 election, Listhaug's party surged to second place and more than doubled their prior seat count.

== Political views ==
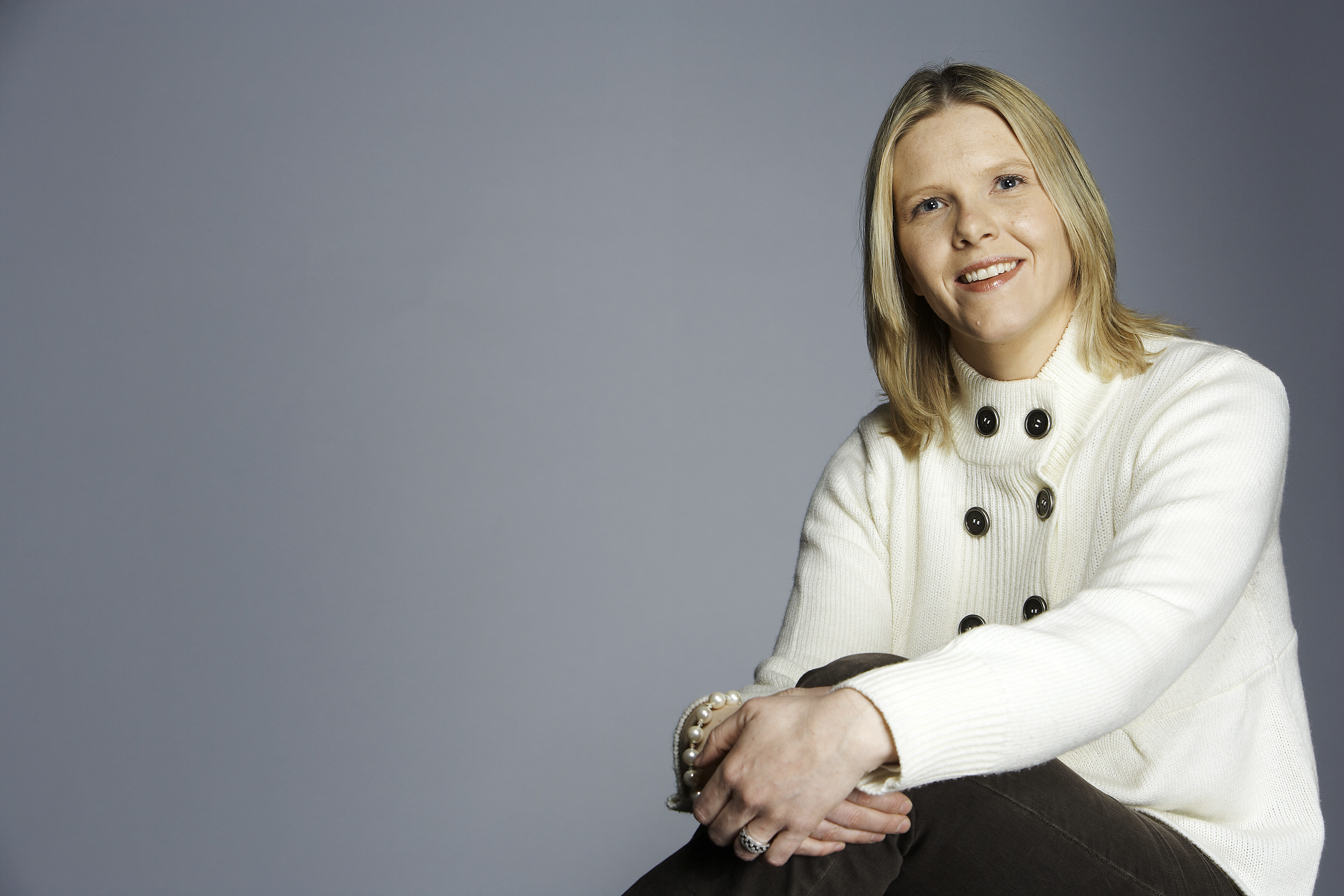
Listhaug in 2009.

Listhaug believes that the elderly should have legal rights to a place in private nursing homes paid by public funding. She has advocated "zero tolerance" on crime, more visible police, and said that integration has to become better by having stricter demands on people who move to Norway, combined with a more restrictive immigration policy.

Although a lifelong Christian, Listhaug has considered leaving the Church of Norway which she has described as "thoroughly socialist", due to the former Red-Green government's interventionist policy on appointment of bishops, as well as church leaders in her view voicing political opinions on too many issues. Favoring a separation of church and state, she has pointed to it "working well" in the United States. She has been a repeat guest on the Christian television channel Visjon Norge, which has been critiqued, including by Anders Torp, son of Pentecostal pastor Jan-Aage Torp.

Listhaug is in favor of immigrant repatriation from Norway. She has advocated voluntary return, in her role as Integration Minister, for rejected asylum seekers and other migrants. She has stated that Norway needed to "entice more [people] to voluntarily travel back" to their homelands, claiming it was "better for us to encourage them to travel back", rather than face deportation and would ultimately save Norway money. During her government tenure, record numbers of illegal immigrants were simultaneously deported from Norway. Listhaug has stated her position that "I think those who come to Norway need to adapt to our society. Here we eat pork, drink alcohol and show our face. You must abide by the values, laws and regulations that are in Norway when you come here". Her proposals includes calling for a ban on the hijab in elementary schools.

Listhaug is a proponent of banning full-face veils and hijabs in elementary schools, arguing that "we need to fight the culture of social control and controlling women". She is a proponent of barring hate preachers from entering Norway.

=== Migration policy ===
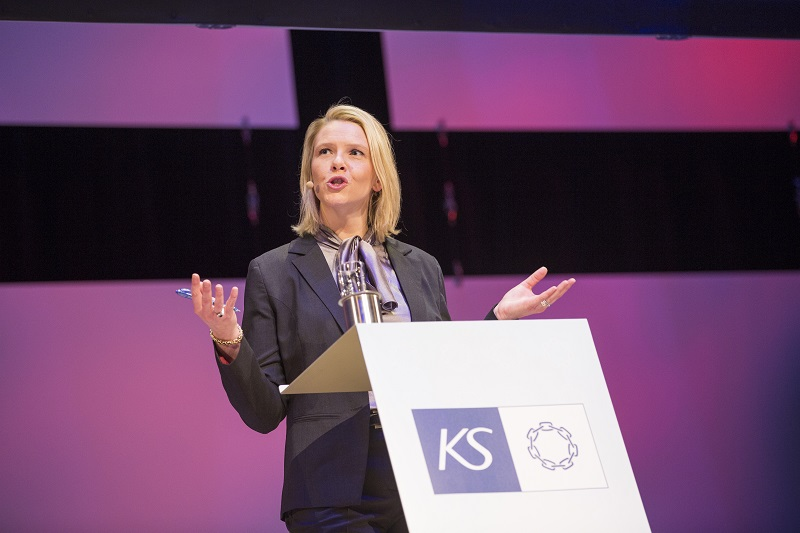
Listhaug speaking to the Norwegian Association of Local and Regional Authorities in 2016.

She is noted for her hard-line immigration policy. As Minister of Migration and Integration, Listhaug presented a 150-page document with 40 proposals for new asylum- and migration regulations, in which she claimed would make Norway's migrant policy "one of the strictest in Europe". The proposals, which failed to gain necessary parliamentary support in June 2016, included proposals such as:

- Changed ID clarification procedures;
- Simplifying the process for the refusal of asylum applications;
- Introducing temporary protection until age 18 for unaccompanied minors;
- Easier deportation of persons whose applications are supposedly unfounded;
- Stricter integration criteria for permanent residency;
- Tighter restrictions on right to family reunification.

The proposal also included procedures which would allow detaining migrants who submit "obviously groundless asylum claims" for up to 72 hours, in order to prevent them from evading deportation. Speaking to state broadcaster NRK, Sylvi Listhaug said: "We can see that unfounded asylum seekers disappear while the police are processing their applications. This will prohibit them from running off and eventually getting involved in criminal activity. Now we will know where we have them, get their applications processed and then return them". Minister Listhaug added that 90 out of 537 asylum seekers processed under the 48-hour procedure in 2015 disappeared, and that the locations of ninety percent of those still remain unknown to authorities. The proposals also would expand the ability of law enforcement agencies to store and acquire biometric information such as fingerprints, in order to determine whether an asylum applicant may present a security threat.

Sweden's Migration Minister Heléne Fritzon canceled a meeting due to be held with Sylvi Listhaug in August 2017, claiming that Listhaug spread an "inaccurate image of Sweden". Listhaug had said in an interview with Verdens Gang that "parallel societies have developed in more than 60 places in Sweden", calling them "no-go zones", while insisting that there are conditions of lawlessness in some areas with large quantities of people with immigrant backgrounds.

=== Law and order ===
As Minister of Justice, Listhaug has drawn attention for calling pedophile perpetrators "monsters," with some critics suggesting that it could mislead children in who to watch out for. Listhaug announced more legislative changes to stop pedophiles committing assaults abroad, and told reporters: "It is absolutely terrible to think that these monsters are allowed to leave our country and travel to places where poor families and poor children are exploited in the worst way". Listhaug added that "we must do whatever we can to stop them". She is a proponent of stripping these individuals of their passports when sentenced for this type of abuse, not allowing them to leave the country.

She has advocated for "zero tolerance" on crime and called for more visible police, primarily in the capital Oslo. She has advocated for stricter punishments and harsher prison sentencing, particularly for crimes against children. Listhaug is opposed to capital punishment.

=== Foreign policy ===
A strong supporter of Israel, Listhaug has voiced support for moving the Norwegian embassy in Israel from Tel Aviv to Jerusalem. Listhaug told reporters in 2017 that European nations "and their citizens need to understand the situation in Israel better", and added that "the Progress Party has always been a supporter of Israel's need to protect themselves in a region where you are the only democracy". She made it clear that the party does not necessarily support everything the State of Israel does, but stated that "you have a right to defend your people and your borders because you live in a region that has a lot of problems".

During the 2016 U.S. presidential election, Listhaug stated to Verdens Gang that she tends to support the Republican Party, however, not Donald Trump. She made it clear that she was "no fan of Hillary Clinton", but was concerned about Trump's statements regarding NATO and free trade. Listhaug is noted as an admirer of Ronald Reagan.

Listhaug endorsed the Sweden Democrats party during the 2022 Swedish general election, becoming the first Progress Party leader to do so, and supports their policies on immigration but has stated that she was not looking to build an official alliance with the party due to differences in economic policy.

=== Social issues ===
Listhaug originally opposed the introduction of same-sex marriage in Norway in 2009, but in 2017 said she had turned to support it and become critical of Visjon Norge leader Jan Hanvold.

== Personal life ==
Listhaug is married to fellow Progress Party politician Espen Espeset, and together they have one daughter and two sons. Raised on the family farm in Ørskog Municipality in Sunnmøre, Listhaug currently resides in Oslo.

== Publications ==
Her book, Der Andre Tier (ISBN 9788248922650), was published by Kagge in 2018.

Party political offices
Preceded by Per Sandberg	First Deputy Leader of the Progress Party; 2018–2021	Succeeded by Ketil Solvik-Olsen
Preceded by Siv Jensen	Leader of the Progress Party; 2021–present	Incumbent
Political offices
Preceded by Margaret Eckbo	Oslo City Commissioner of Welfare and Social Services; 2006–2011	Succeeded by Anniken Hauglie
Preceded by Trygve Slagsvold Vedum	Minister of Agriculture and Food; 2013–2015	Succeeded by Jon Georg Dale
New office	Minister of Immigration and Integration; 2015–2018	Succeeded by Herself as Minister of Justice, Public Security and Immigration
Preceded by Per-Willy Amundsen	Minister of Justice, Public Security and Immigration; January–March 2018	Succeeded by Tor Mikkel Wara
Preceded by Åse Michaelsen	Minister of Eldely and Public Health; May–December 2019	Succeeded by Terje Søviknes
Preceded by Kjell-Børge Freiberg	Minister of Petroleum and Energy; 2019–2020	Succeeded by Tina Bru
