= Ketil Solvik-Olsen =

Norwegian politician

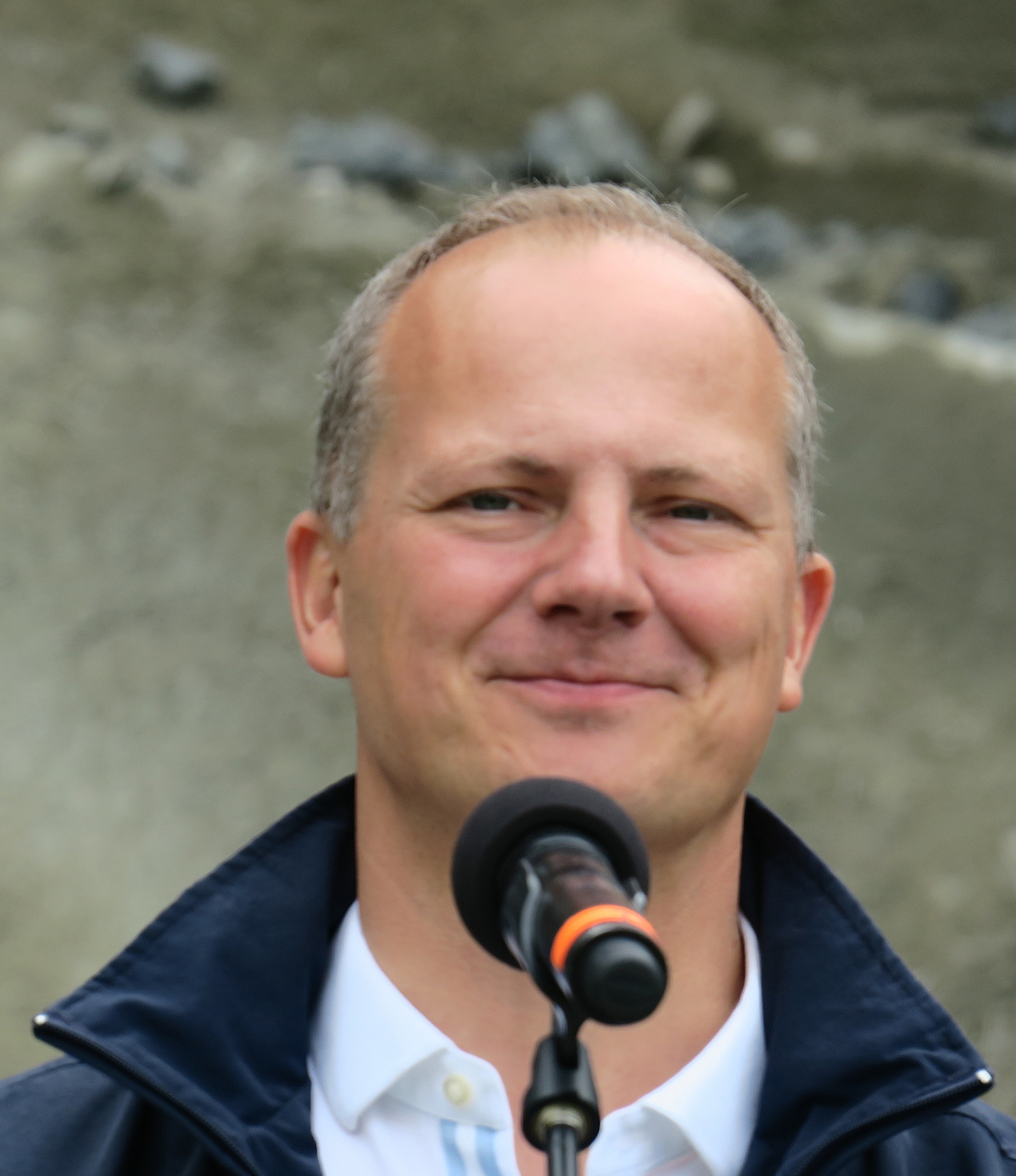

Minister of Transport and Communications
- In office 16 October 2013 – 31 August 2018
- Prime Minister: Erna Solberg
- Preceded by: Marit Arnstad
- Succeeded by: Jon Georg Dale

First Deputy Leader of the Progress Party
- In office 8 May 2021 – 30 April 2023
- Leader: Sylvi Listhaug
- Preceded by: Sylvi Listhaug
- Succeeded by: Hans Andreas Limi

Second Deputy Leader of the Progress Party
- In office 26 May 2013 – 5 May 2019
- Leader: Siv Jensen
- Preceded by: Per Arne Olsen
- Succeeded by: Terje Søviknes

Member of the Norwegian Parliament
- In office 1 October 2005 – 16 October 2013
- Constituency: Rogaland

Personal details
- Born: 14 February 1972 (age 54) Time Municipality, Rogaland, Norway
- Party: Progress
- Spouse: Tone Solvik-Olsen
- Children: 2
- Education: University of Toledo
- Website: Official website

Ketil Solvik-Olsen (born 14 February 1972) is a Norwegian politician of the Progress Party. He served as Minister of Transport and Communications in the Norwegian government from 2013 to 2018, and was a member of the Norwegian Parliament for Rogaland county from 2005 until 2013. He resigned in 2018 when moving temporary to the U.S in support of his wife's medical career.

He has served in the Progress Party leadership over several decades. He served as the party's second deputy leader from 2013 to 2019 and first deputy leader from 2021 to 2023.

Today he is involved in various roles in business, having recently been CEO of Seabrokers Fundamentering (a Norwegian construction/foundation company), as well as serving on the board of a variety tech/mobility startup companies.

== Early life and education ==
Solvik-Olsen was born and raised in Time Municipality in Rogaland to self-employed businessman Aksel Emil Solvik-Olsen (born 1943) and socionom Berit Lagergren (born 1943). After finishing Rosseland Elementary School, he attended Bryne Upper Secondary school, and later an International Baccalaureate at St. Olav Upper Secondary school in Stavanger from 1990 to 1992.

He was an exchange student to the United States at Blissfield High School, Michigan from 1989 to 1990. From 1994 to 1997 he studied political science and social economics (summa cum laude) at the University of Toledo, Ohio. He spent over five years in the US, including work for Disney, as a volunteer during the 1996 Atlanta Olympics, and as an intern in the United States Senate.

== Political career ==
=== Early career ===
Solvik-Olsen joined the Progress Party's Youth when he was fifteen years old, in 1987. He held various positions locally within the youth organisation from 1988 to 1992. He made his way into national politics initially by working as a political advisor and aide to Øyvind Vaksdal and Siv Jensen for five years, having moved to Oslo around 1998.

=== Parliamentary career ===
Aside from being deputy in the Oslo city council, he had never before served as an elected official when he was elected to the Storting from Rogaland in 2005. He was re-elected in 2009. He was a member of the Standing Committee on Energy and the Environment from 2005 to 2011, and delegate to the United Nations General Assembly from 2011.

Solvik-Olsen announced in 2012 that he would not seek renomination for the 2013 parliamentary election due to family concerns including his wife's career as a medical doctor.

=== Minister of Transport and Communications ===
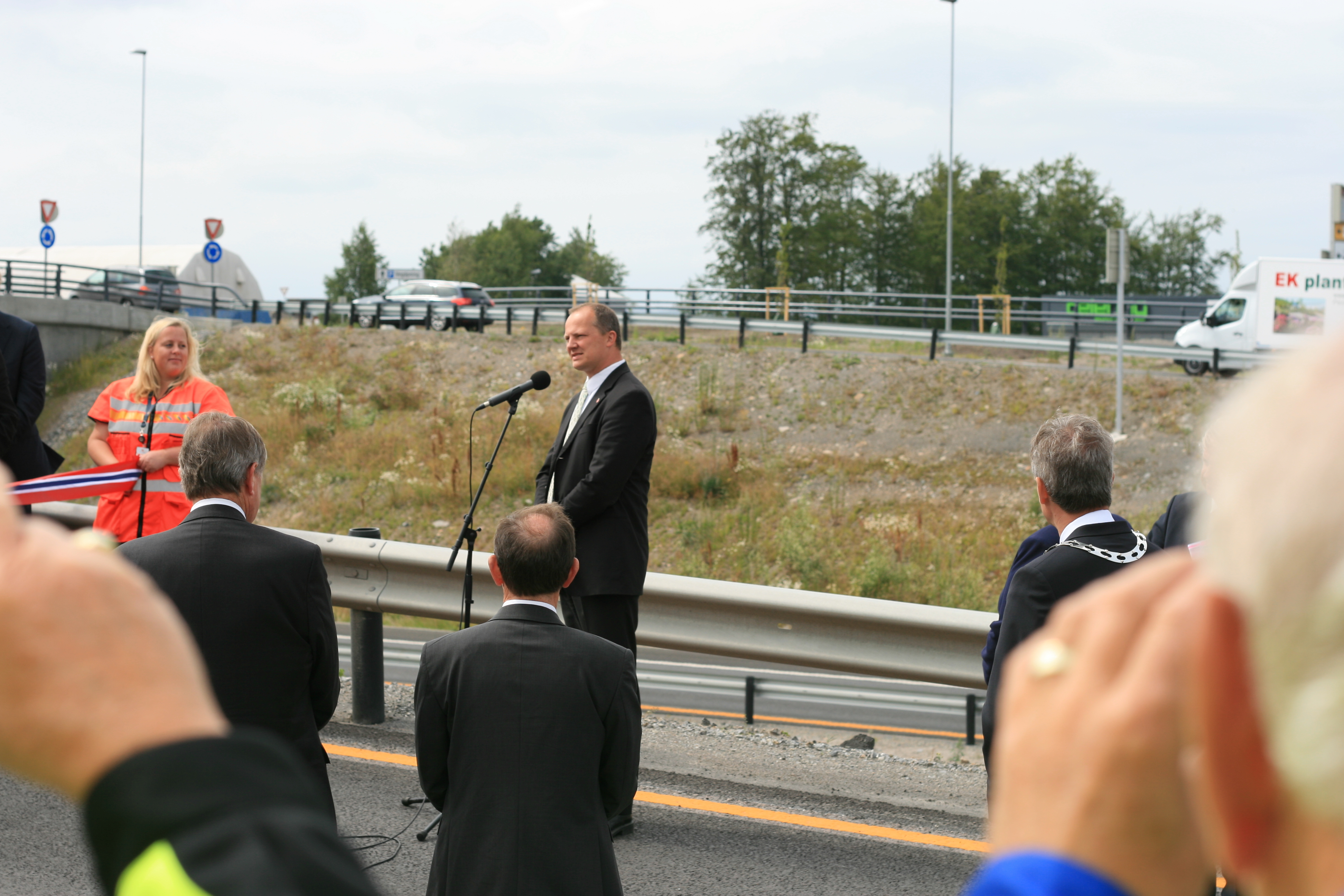
Solvik-Olsen opens European route E18 in Vestfold County.

After the 2013 election, Solvik-Olsen was appointed Minister of Transportation in Erna Solberg's new cabinet.

Before taking up the post, the Progress Party had announced that it would be reducing the amount of toll roads, and this was widely expected to be one of the most important transformation reforms. Despite immediately beginning to dismantle some existing toll booths, and cancelling some planned toll projects, there was disappointment among his party's core constituency over the slow pace of the reform.

In late August 2018, he resigned as minister to join his wife in Birmingham, Alabama, where she had received a position at a children's hospital. He did not rule out returning to politics, and added that he would stay active in the party. He was succeeded by minister of agriculture and food, Jon Georg Dale.

=== Party deputy leader ===
At the 2013 party congress, Solvik-Olsen was elected second deputy leader of the Progress Party. He held this post until the party congress in May 2019, and did not seek re-election. He was succeeded by Terje Søviknes.

Following Siv Jensen's announced resignation, the party designated Solvik-Olsen as first deputy leader, along with Søviknes as second deputy and Sylvi Listhaug as party leader. He was subsequently elected as first deputy at the party convention in May, along with Listhaug as leader. On 1 March 2023, he announced that he wouldn't be seeking re-election as deputy leader. He was succeeded by Hans Andreas Limi at the party convention in April.

== Political views ==
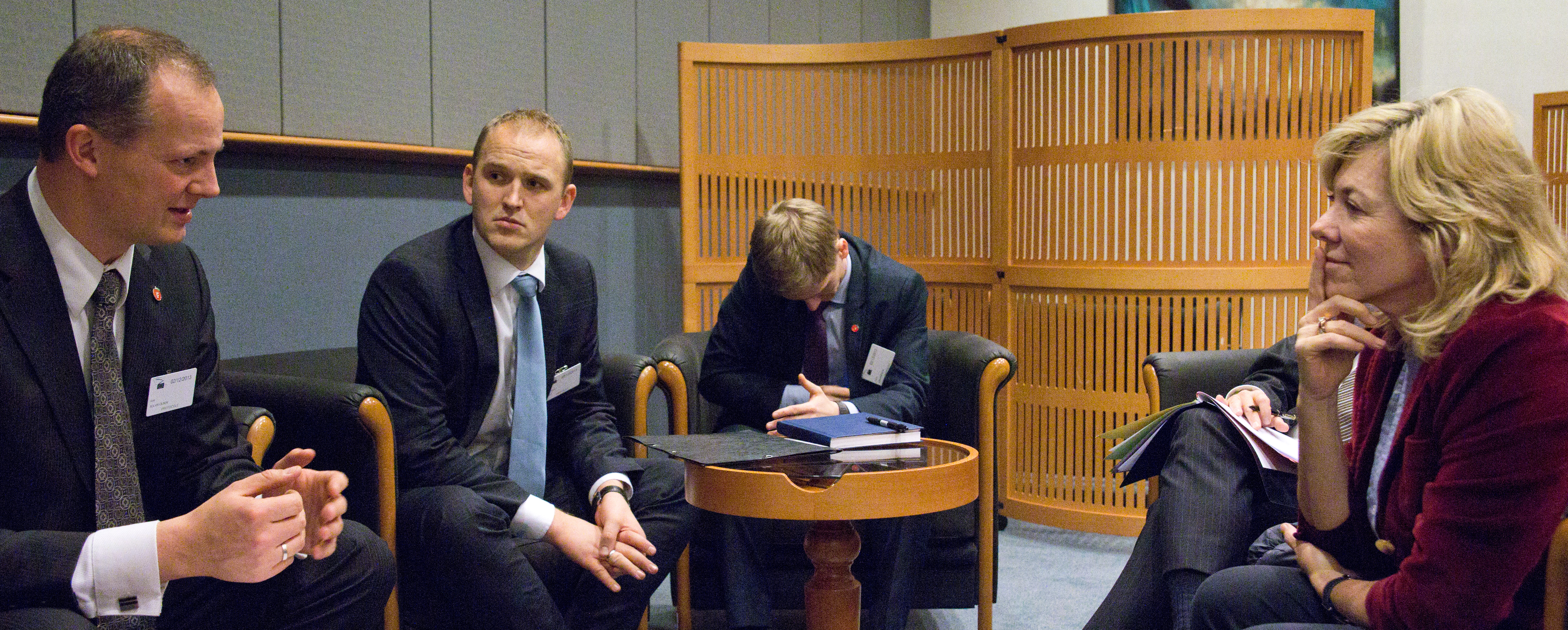
Solvik-Olsen during a meeting with Pilar del Castillo in Brussels, Belgium.

Solvik-Olsen has stated that he thinks Norway needs a "liberalism that is pragmatic". He was noted as a critic of the Red-Green governmental environmental policies, claiming their policies to be based too much on "symbol politics" and unrealistic ambitious goals, instead of seeking feasible realistic options. He has said that he is personally social conservative, though liberal with regards to how other people wish to live their lives.

He has stated that Ronald Reagan is his foremost political hero, though he also has pictures of Martin Luther King Jr. and John F. Kennedy decorating his home. He was a member of the pro-Israel caucus Friends of Israel in the Parliament of Norway, and has held speeches at pro-Israel rallies.

He was invited to attend the second inauguration of Donald Trump in 2025, which he said he greatly looked forward to.

== Personal life ==
He is married to Tone Solvik-Olsen, a medical doctor. Together they have two children, one girl and one boy. The family currently resides in the Voksenåsen neighborhood in the Oslo borough of Vestre Aker. Solvik-Olsen has described himself as an "atypical Progress Party-person" due to his relatively careful and modest lifestyle, not fitting several stereotypes of the traditional party supporter.

A lifelong teetotaler, he abstains from all stimulants, including tobacco, and coffee. He is however, a notorious aficionado of chocolate, an addiction which has been described as "morbid". He compensates the high-sugar diet by eating very small regular meals, and skipping lunch altogether. Since his stay in the United States, Solvik-Olsen has been an automobile enthusiast; his collection includes a second generation 1985 model Cadillac Seville, a convertible Dodge Stratus, in addition to over 80 model cars. He is a supporter of Bryne FK football club.

Solvik-Olsen publicly announced his withdrawal from the Church of Norway in 2010, after the church leadership had publicly opposed oil exploration in Lofoten and Vesterålen. He is connected to Pentecostalism, as he for several years has attended the Pentecostal congregation Filadelfia Oslo. While his wife is a member of the congregation and his two children are baptised there, he is not a formal member himself since it requires believer's baptism, and he considers his childhood baptism to be valid and sufficient. He has stated that as of present he only has his personal direct contact with God, not being part of any "earthly membership lists".
