= Tord Lien =

Norwegian politician

Tord Lien MP
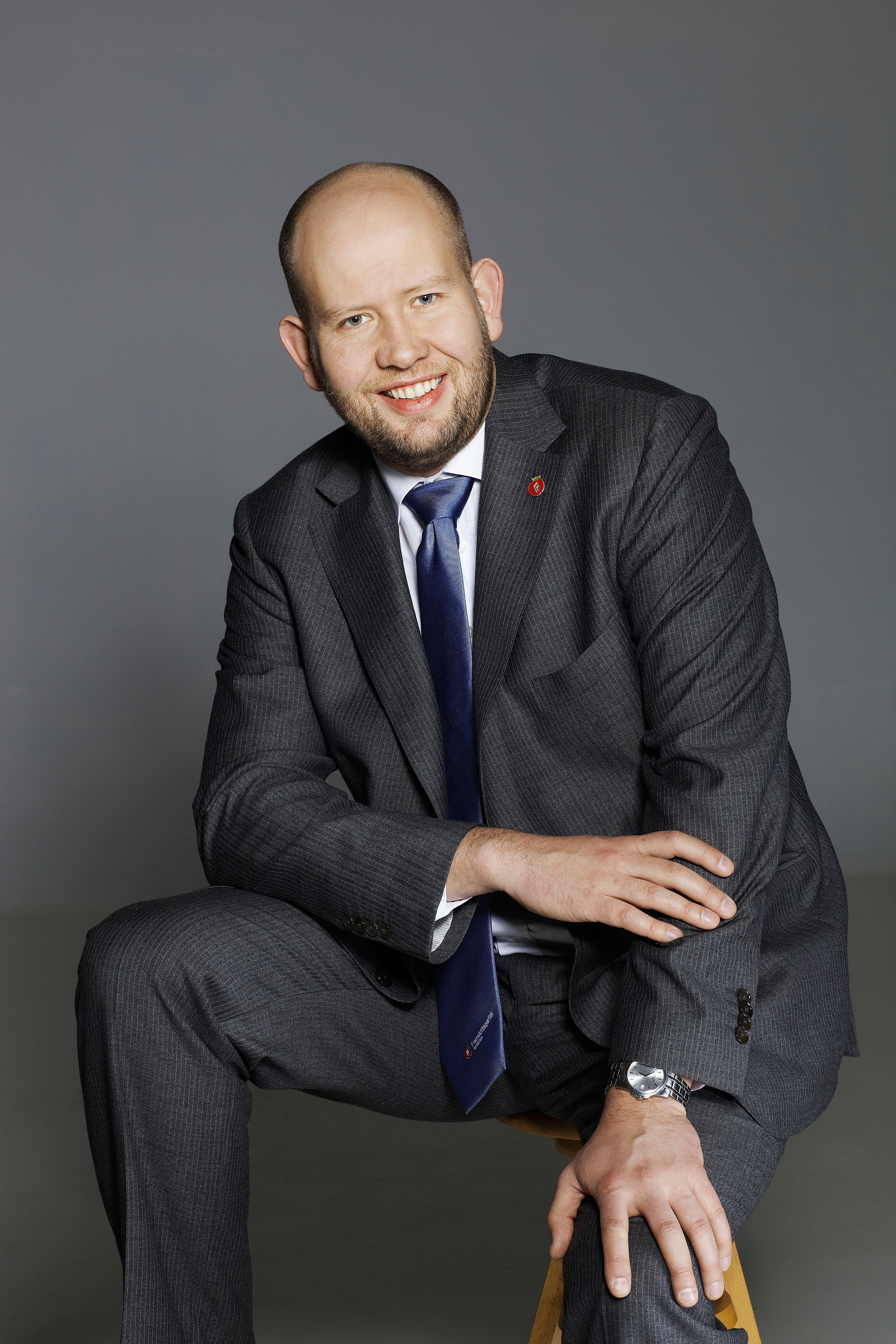

Minister of Petroleum and Energy
- In office 16 October 2013 – 20 December 2016
- Prime Minister: Erna Solberg
- Preceded by: Ola Borten Moe
- Succeeded by: Terje Søviknes

Member of the Norwegian Parliament
- In office 1 October 2005 – 30 September 2013
- Constituency: Sør-Trøndelag

Personal details
- Born: Tord Andrè Lien; 10 September 1975 (age 51) Øksnes Municipality, Nordland, Norway
- Party: Progress
- Spouse: Kristin Reitstøen
- Children: 2
- Education: University of Nordland; Norwegian University of Science and Technology

Tord André Lien (born 10 September 1975 in Øksnes Municipality) is a Norwegian politician for the Progress Party and served as the Minister of Petroleum and Energy from 2013 to 2016. He was also a member of Parliament from Sør-Trøndelag from 2005 to 2013. Lien is the holder of an advanced degree in history (cand. philol.), having written his thesis on aspects of Norway's defence policy in the early 20th century.

== Political career ==
=== Local politics ===
Lien was a member of the municipal council of Trondheim Municipality from 2003 to 2005.

=== Parliament ===
He was elected to the Norwegian Parliament from Sør-Trøndelag in 2005, and was re-elected in 2009. On 30 April 2012, he announced that he wouldn't be seeking re-election for the 2013 election.

=== Minister of Petroleum and Energy ===
Following the Conservative faction’s victory in the 2013 election, Lien was appointed minister of petroleum and energy in Erna Solberg's Cabinet.

On 20 December 2016, he was succeeded by Terje Søviknes as minister of petroleum and energy in a cabinet reshuffle. Lien stated that he stepped down in order to take care of his family, notably that his wife had drawn the line for his job as minister. He had originally intended to stay on until at least the 2017 election.

== Other ==
In 1994, Lien was involved in a serious road accident and was sentenced to 40 days prison for speeding and traffic violations.

== Personal life ==
Lien is married to Kristin Reitstøen, with whom he has two daughters.
