= Siv Jensen =

Norwegian politician (born 1969)

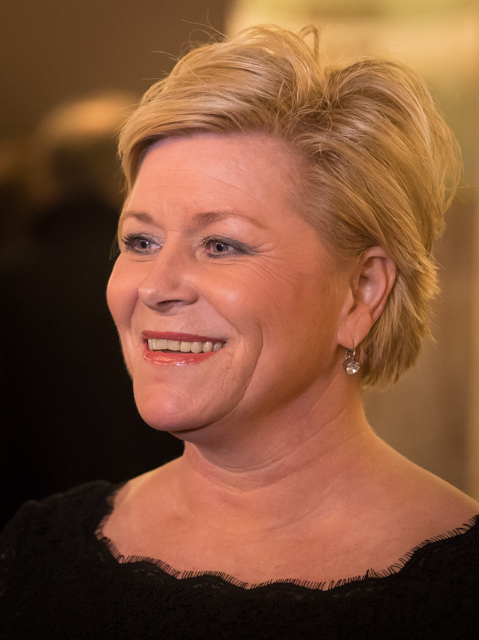
- Jensen in 2017

Minister of Finance
- In office 16 October 2013 – 24 January 2020
- Prime Minister: Erna Solberg
- Preceded by: Sigbjørn Johnsen
- Succeeded by: Jan Tore Sanner

Leader of the Progress Party
- In office 6 May 2006 – 8 May 2021
- First Deputy: Per Sandberg; Sylvi Listhaug
- Second Deputy: Per Arne Olsen; Ketil Solvik-Olsen; Terje Søviknes
- Preceded by: Carl I. Hagen
- Succeeded by: Sylvi Listhaug

First Deputy Leader of the Progress Party
- In office 2 May 1999 – 6 May 2006
- Leader: Carl I. Hagen
- Preceded by: Lodve Solholm
- Succeeded by: Per Sandberg

Parliamentary Leader of the Progress Party
- In office 28 January 2020 – 8 May 2021
- Leader: Herself
- Preceded by: Hans Andreas Limi
- Succeeded by: Sylvi Listhaug
- In office 5 October 2005 – 17 October 2013
- Leader: Carl I. Hagen; Herself
- Preceded by: Carl I. Hagen
- Succeeded by: Harald T. Nesvik

Member of the Norwegian Parliament
- In office 1 October 1997 – 30 September 2021
- Deputy: Mazyar Keshvari
- Constituency: Oslo

Deputy Member of the Storting
- In office 1 October 1993 – 30 September 1997
- Constituency: Oslo

Personal details
- Born: 1 June 1969 (age 57) Oslo, Norway
- Party: Progress
- Education: Norwegian School of Economics

Siv Jensen (born 1 June 1969) is a Norwegian politician who served as the leader of the Progress Party from 2006 to 2021. She also held the position as Minister of Finance from 2013 to 2020 in the Solberg Cabinet. She was also a member of the Norwegian parliament from Oslo from 1997 to 2021.

Born and raised in Oslo, Jensen graduated with a degree in business studies from the Norwegian School of Economics. She was first elected to parliament in the 1997 parliamentary election, and has later been re-elected for four consecutive terms. She chaired the parliamentary Standing Committee on Finance and Economic Affairs from 2001 to 2005, and in 2006 succeeded long-time chairman Carl I. Hagen as leader of the Progress Party.

Jensen was the Progress Party's candidate for Prime Minister in the 2009 parliamentary election, which saw record high results for the party. For the 2013 parliamentary election she supported prospects of a coalition government headed by the Conservative Party, and led her party into the Solberg Cabinet, the Progress Party's first ever government participation.

Jensen became Norway's longest-serving Minister of Finance since World War II in October 2019.

== Early life and education ==
Siv Jensen was born in Oslo to self-employed Tore Jensen (1926–1989), and Monica Kjelsberg (born 1939), owners of a shoe store during her childhood. While she holds that her neighbourhood was a nice place to grow up, her home was the scene of numerous burglaries. Her parents were divorced around 1980, and her father soon moved to Sweden. Her mother was for a short while active in the Ullern Progress Party, until finding out that politics was "not her thing".

After completing Marienlyst elementary school in 1985, Jensen attended upper secondary school at Oslo Commerce School in Oslo's Frogner district, graduating in 1988. Afterwards she enrolled in the Norwegian School of Economics, receiving her degree in business studies in 1992. She worked as a sales consultant for Radio 1 from 1992, until dedicating her professional life to politics full-time in 1994.

Her political interest was according to herself sparked at her elementary school Marienlyst where discussions were common in class. These discussions would include two students who were members of the Socialist Youth, one being her socialist-turned best friend. Jensen however soon found herself strongly opposed to their views. She joined the Progress Party in 1988, in part having been introduced to the party through her mother. Sometime before joining the party, she had briefly been a member of the Young Conservatives, for about a week.

== Political career ==
=== Member of Parliament ===
Jensen has been a member of the Storting from the Oslo constituency since first being elected in 1997, while having served as a deputy representative from 1993 to 1997. As she was appointed to the government cabinet in 2013, deputy representative Mazyar Keshvari has met as a regular member in her place. From 2001 to 2005 Jensen chaired the Standing Committee on Finance and Economic Affairs, having been a member of the committee since 1997, and from 2005 to 2013 she was a member of the Standing Committee on Foreign Affairs and Defence. She played a central role in budget negotiations with the centrist government of Kjell Magne Bondevik, and her work chairing the Finance Committee led her to become increasingly more profiled as a leader-figure within her party.

=== Party leadership ===
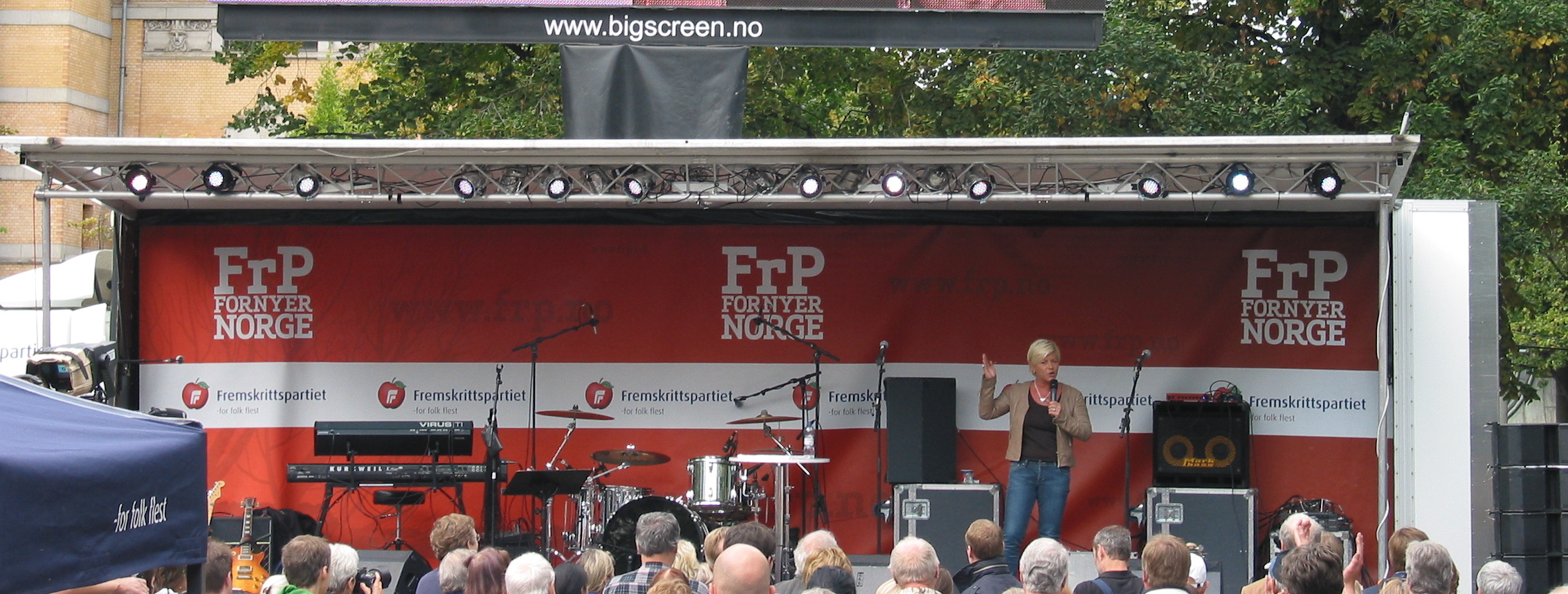
Siv Jensen speaking at a rally in Oslo in the 2009 electoral campaign

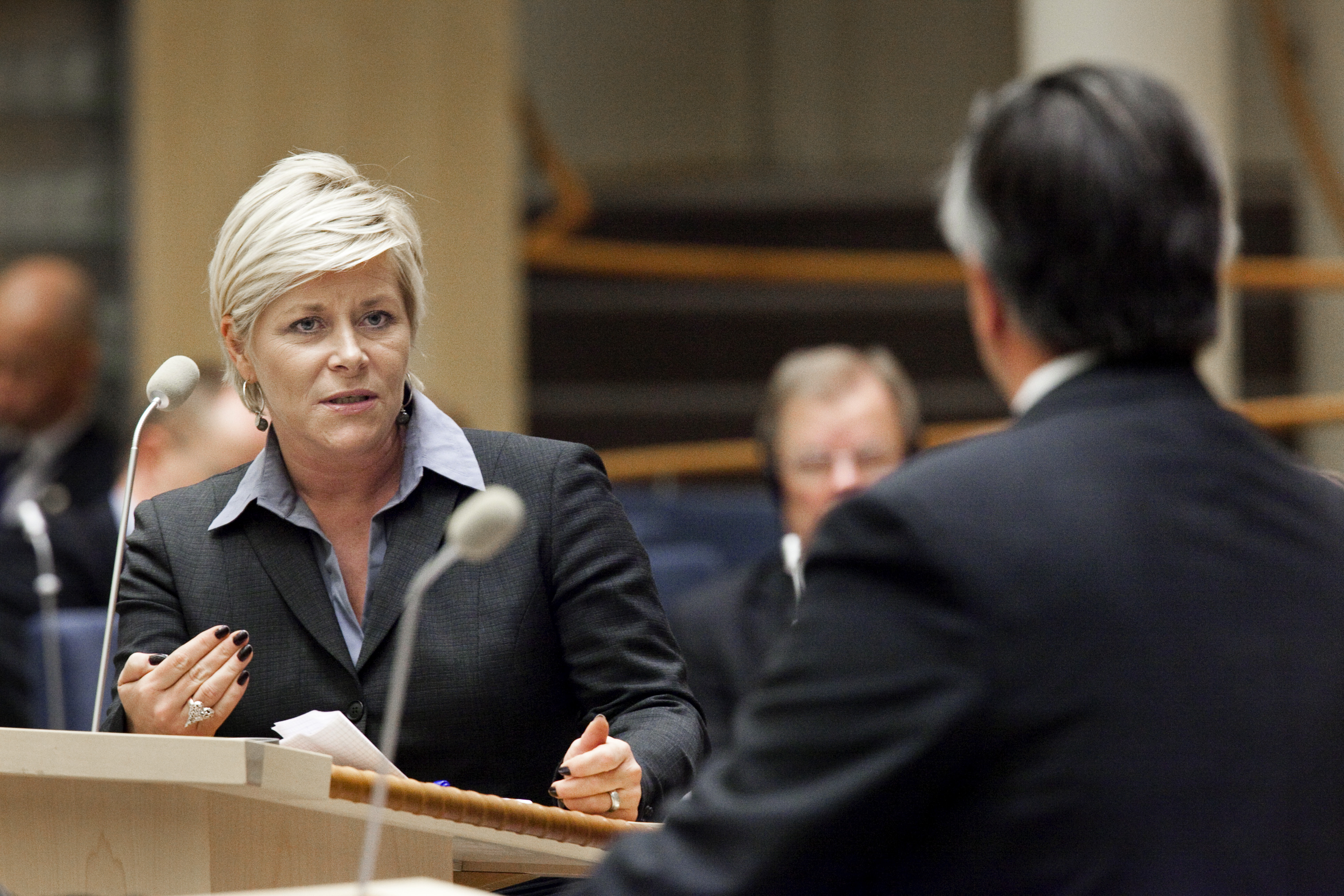
Siv Jensen in Stockholm, Sweden, 2009

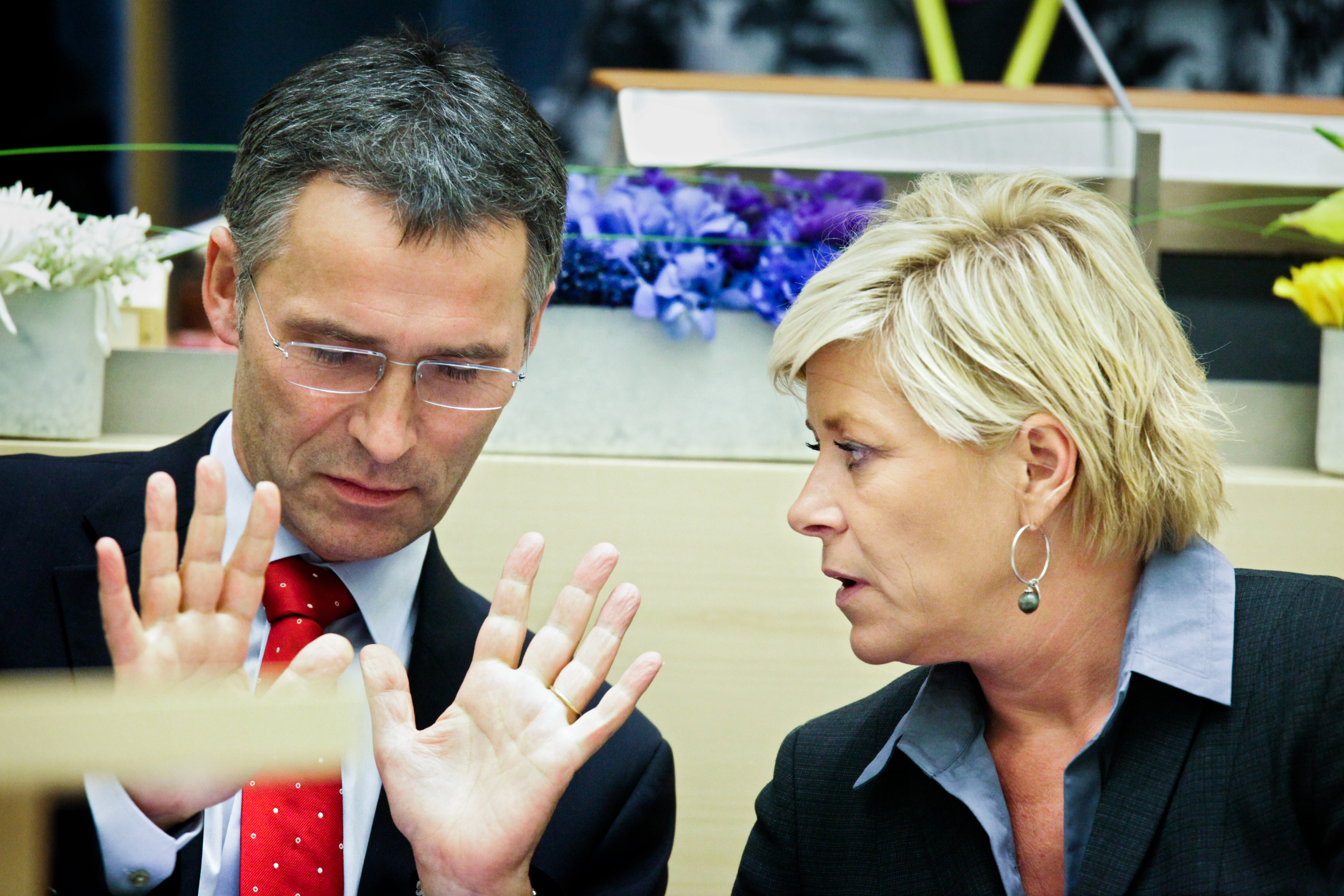
Jensen with former Prime Minister Jens Stoltenberg

During the early 1990s, conflict within the party between the younger libertarians and party chairman Carl I. Hagen, Jensen stood on the side of Hagen. She also supported Hagen in the 2001 internal conflict, and stated the same year that Hagen had been like a father figure for her. She became first deputy chairman of the Progress Party in 1998, and parliamentary leader of the party in 2005. In 2006, Carl I. Hagen, chairman of the party since 1978 resigned to become vice president of parliament, and Jensen assumed leadership of the Progress Party to no internal opposition. While many had been speculating about the viability of the party and its future after Hagen resigning, a 2004 survey showed that Jensen enjoyed better general support than him, which was explained by her not being as controversial. Many had also predicted a more moderate course for the party with her being the leader, but she stood firmly by the policies of the party. Her leadership-style has however been considered to be softer than that of Hagen.

In May 2009, Jensen held a lecture in the House of Commons of the United Kingdom at the invitation of Conservative Party MP Malcolm Rifkind. Media director Alex Try of the think tank Henry Jackson Society, who was responsible for the arrangement, said that the main background for the invitation was her "engagement in questions about terrorism and challenges attached to the multicultural society." Up to one-hundred MP's, business leaders and key persons in British politics was expected to show up at the arrangement. Jensen said that "we have much to learn from the British, but when it comes to the immigration policy I think Britain has failed completely".

As leader of the Progress Party, Jensen took the initiative to talks with Conservative Party leader Erna Solberg in early 2007, seeking to build a broad centre-right coalition for the 2009 election. Amid unresolved dispute among the centre-right parties, she launched herself as candidate for Prime Minister for the 2009 election and received a record share of the vote of 22.9%, although the parties combined ultimately lost out to the centre-left coalition.

In 2011, newspaper Aftenposten wrote that the Progress Party during Jensen's leadership, had experienced their "two best national elections". Ahead of the 2013 election Jensen continued working for a broad centre-right coalition, and endorsed Erna Solberg for Prime Minister. Although seeing its vote drop significantly, she led the Progress Party into government coalition talks for the first time in its history.

Following the other coalition parties' decision to bring home an ISIS related woman and her sick child, Jensen announced on 20 January 2020 that her party was withdrawing from government in protest to the decision. Other reasons cited was that the party been unable to promote their policy in government, and Jensen stated "it's not worth continuous losses". She, along with the other Progress Party ministers officially withdrew from the government on 24 January, marking the first time a party had withdrawn from government.

On 18 February 2021, Jensen announced that she would step down as party leader after a new one is elected at the party convention in May. She also said she would not be running for re-election in the September election. She cited her reasons to be to focus more on her personal life and family and pointed to Sylvi Listhaug as her preferred successor. Listhaug was subsequently designated her successor in late March, and was officially elected at the party convention on 8 May.

=== Minister of Finance ===
On 16 October 2013, Jensen was appointed Minister of Finance as the Progress Party joined a minority coalition government led by the Conservative Party, the party's first ever government participation. Jensen's first national budget included proposals of cutting taxes, and spending more of Norway's oil wealth, and she also appointed a committee to consider changes to the 4% budgetary rule of Oil Fund spending.

== Post-political career ==
In August 2021, it was announced that Jensen had accepted to lead an organisation working with drowning prevention initiated by the Norwegian Society for Sea Rescue. The umbrella organisation was in June 2022 revealed to be named Flyte. She stepped down from the role in January 2024 in order to become a political advisor.

== Political views ==
=== Economy ===
Jensen has described her party to be a "classical liberal party and also a very democratic party", and that its "basic main focus areas are individual freedom, individual rights, less state and more individual freedom", also that the party is "in favor of more competition instead of less. Because we fight state monopolies because they don't do good for competition, for price levels, for people's ability to choose between different distributors. That's our basic ideology behind the party".

Having been called a "Norwegian Margaret Thatcher" in the British press, Jensen has said she views former British Prime Minister Margaret Thatcher as one of her "political heroes". Considering Thatcher "a controversial politician who dared to stand for something," Jensen has expressed support for Thatcherite policies such as "there is no alternative (to market economy)".

=== Israel ===
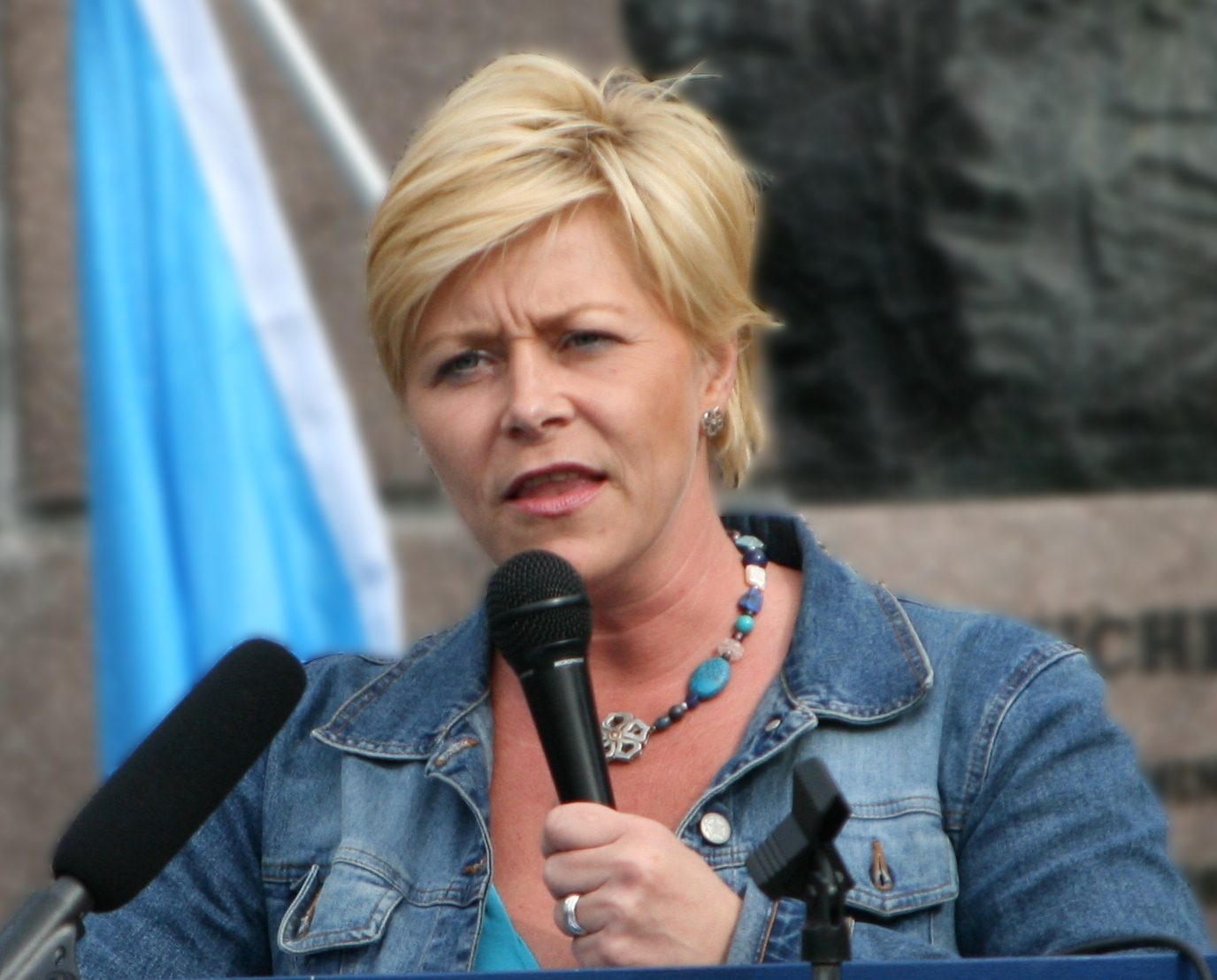

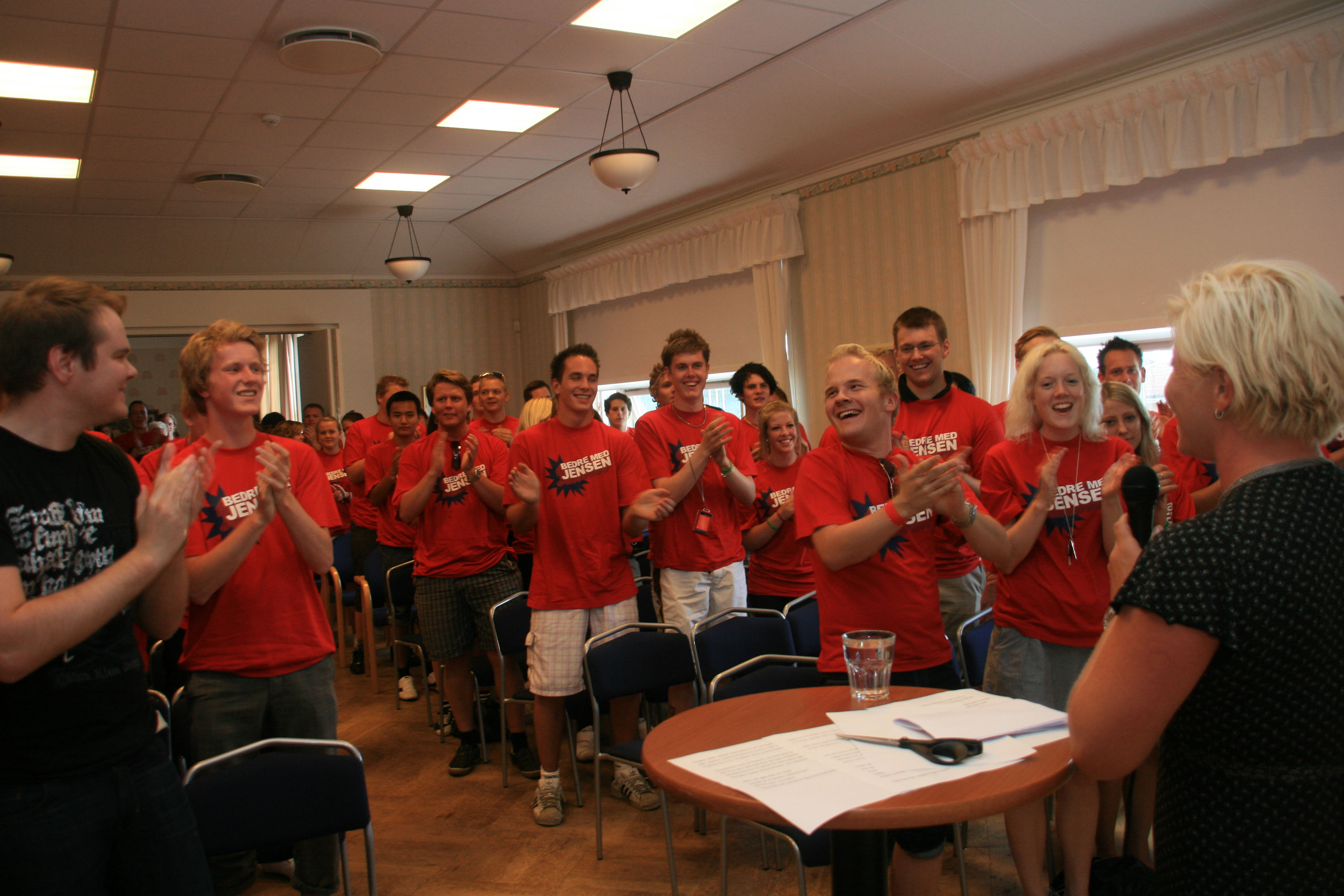
Siv Jensen speaking before a Progress Party’s Youth summer camp

Jensen is a staunch supporter of Israel, and has stated that she is "not afraid to defend Israel's right to defend itself." She visited the Israeli city of Sderot in the summer of 2008 and experienced Hamas bombing first hand, forcing her and her company to run for the air-raid shelter. She strongly opposed the Norwegian government's decision to recognise Hamas as she holds that "you don't negotiate with terrorists, you just don't." Jensen has in addition advocated moving the Norwegian embassy in Israel from Tel Aviv to Jerusalem, while also being open to accepting a future recognition of a Palestinian state.

In January 2009, in light of the Gaza War, she held an appeal at a demonstration called "Let Israel live" in support of Israel in Oslo. The Progress Party's general Israel-policy, supported by the appearance at the demonstration by Jensen and the fact that Christian Democratic Party leader Dagfinn Høybråten had not joined the demonstration, resulted in many Christian Democratic voters turning to the Progress Party. Soon after, the Norwegian Police Security Service (PST) went public, fearing that Jensen might be the target of attacks. During the speech, which was held amid the 2008–09 Oslo riots, Jensen and pro-Israel demonstrators were suddenly attacked by violent rioters throwing rocks, and Jensen was forced to leave the podium.

=== Radical Islam ===
In February 2009, Jensen held a speech where she warned about what she called a "sneaking Islamisation" (snikislamisering) of Norway on the background of a public debate about allowing hijab as part of the police uniform, and demands from Muslim groups of Muslim-only education and special food in prisons. The speech turned out to be highly controversial in the other parties. She used the immigrant-heavy Malmö, Sweden city district of Rosengård to illustrate failed integration policies, claiming that Sharia law had replaced Swedish law and that emergency staff could not drive into certain areas. The statements proved highly controversial in Sweden, and the Progress Party was invited to a tour around Rosengård by the mayor and police chief of Malmö, which it accepted. Jensen did however not join the tour herself.

Further, in March 2009, she stated that the fight against radical Islam "is the most important fight of our time." She said that she, as a classical liberal, would always fight against totalitarian ideas such as communism and National Socialism, and that radical Islam "is a dark and scary ideology." She also accused the other parties of being cowardly, ignoring the questions raised by the Progress Party, and claimed that "it is probably an expression of the fact that they don't understand what's happening in society around them. They close their eyes and try to present themselves as tolerant and liberal, when in fact they are deeply intolerant." In response to an incident in early 2010, where thousands of Muslims demonstrated in Oslo, she changed her claim of a "sneak-Islamisation" of Norway, to instead claim that the debate now was of a full-blown Islamisation. During the demonstration (a response to newspaper Dagbladet publishing a Muhammad cartoon in the context of a news story) Islamist Mohyeldeen Mohammad had notably "warned" of a "9/11" or "7/7" in Norway to applause from the crowd.

=== Climate change ===
In December 2008, Jensen questioned the scientific consensus on climate change that climate change is man-made and dangerous, quoting the 1970s global cooling minority conjecture to cast doubt on climate science. Regardless, she is largely supportive of expanding and researching into renewable energy production. In January 2010, she attacked the IPCC, accusing the report from the panel of being based on fraudulent data. She referred to the erroneous statement of Himalayan glaciers melting by 2035, ice melting predictions by Al Gore and Jonas Gahr Støre, questions of statistical sampling, and emails from climate scientists at the Climatic Research Unit.

== Personal life ==
Besides three half-sisters, Jensen has one younger brother, businessman Tom Einar Jensen, and one younger sister, Nina Jensen, former CEO of WWF. Norway. Her great-grandmother was the early feminist Betzy Kjelsberg. Although she was once engaged, Jensen has never married.

Jensen has stated to be a "proud member of the Church of Norway", while expressing some personal doubt about certain Christian doctrines. She has criticised church leaders for getting too involved in politics, particularly in regard to some church leaders publicly voicing opposition to Norwegian oil drilling.

In 2006, a biography on Siv Jensen was released, written by Martine Aurdal, chief editor of the feminist magazine Fett, later chief editor of the left-wing news magazine Ny Tid.

== Bibliography ==
- Aurdal, Martine (2006). Siv: Portrett av en formann. Oslo: Kagge forlag.

Party political offices
Preceded by Lodve Solholm	First Deputy Leader of the Progress Party; 1999–2006	Succeeded by Per Sandberg
Preceded by Carl Hagen	Leader of the Progress Party; 2006–2021	Succeeded by Sylvi Listhaug
Political offices
Preceded by Sigbjørn Johnsen	Minister of Finance; 2013–2020	Succeeded by Jan Tore Sanner
