= Helge N. Albrektsen =

Norwegian lawyer, writer and politician

Helge N. Albrektsen (born 1950, died 1996) is a Norwegian lawyer, writer and former politician.

Albrektsen was born and raised in Bergen. After studying at a trade school, he worked in the United States for a shipping company. In 1973, he graduated in law at the University of Oslo, specializing in admiralty law. He served his national service in the Royal Norwegian Navy, and thereafter studied at the Columbia Business School in New York. When he came back to Bergen, he started his own law practice, and started writing books.

He joined the Progress Party in 1982, and became deputy chairman of its local Bergen chapter after only ten months. Later, he was elected deputy chairman of the national Progress Party at its 1984 national convention. For the 1985 parliamentary election, he was the only member of the Progress Party who openly challenged a sitting Member of Parliament, namely Bjørn Erling Ytterhorn in Hordaland. Although Albrektsen had support from party chairman Carl I. Hagen, he lost the nomination for first candidate in the county, and declined an offer of running as second candidate, stating that "if I am not trusted as the first candidate, I have nothing there to do". Albrektsen resigned as deputy chairman of the party the same year and left politics.
