= Arve Lønnum =

Norwegian professor of medicine and politician

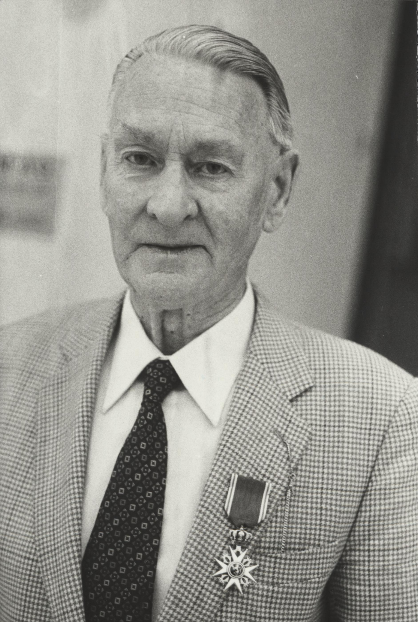
- Arve Johannes Lønnum (1911 – 1988)

Leader of the Anders Lange's Party
- In office 26 May 1975 – 11 February 1978
- Preceded by: Eivind Eckbo
- Succeeded by: Carl I. Hagen

Personal details
- Born: 2 October 1911 Egge Municipality, Norway
- Died: 18 December 1988 (aged 77)
- Party: Anders Lange's Party

Arve Johannes Lønnum (2 October 1911 – 18 December 1988) was a Norwegian professor of medicine and politician for the Progress Party.

He was born in Egge Municipality. He took the cand.med. degree in 1945 and the dr.med. degree in 1966. He was a chief physician at the Akershus University Hospital and professor in neurology at the University of Oslo.

Lønnum wrote many books about health politics and subjects within military history. He became part of the environment around Anders Lange, and was one of the leaders in Anders Lange's Party, where he also was chairman from 1975 to 1978 (from 1977 the name was the Progress Party). He was a member of Oslo city council after the 1987 Norwegian local elections. He sat as a city council member together with his son Arve Lønnum, Jr.

He was decorated with the Royal Norwegian Order of St. Olav. He died in December 1988.
