= Ytterhorn =

Ytterhorn is a Norwegian surname. Notable people with the surname include:

- Bjørn Erling Ytterhorn (1923–1987), Norwegian politician
- Inger-Marie Ytterhorn (1941–2021), Norwegian politician
