= Mustafa Letter =

1987 forgery used by Carl I. Hagen

The Mustafa Letter (Norwegian: Mustafa-brevet) was a controversial letter that the leader of the Progress Party, Carl I. Hagen, used in the electoral campaign for the 1987 Norwegian local elections. The letter was signed Mohammad Mustafa, a Muslim immigrant to Norway, but the media soon proved the letter to be false. The letter became controversial, both in the manner it was used by Hagen, and the claim of it being a fraud.

== Speech and content ==
At the end of the 1987 electoral campaign, on 7 September at a congress in Rørvik, Hagen read from the letter. According to the media, Hagen started off by stating that "the asylum seekers are on their way to take over our fatherland". Thereafter, he read the entire letter, which claimed that Muslims would make Norway "Muslim", and that churches were to be replaced by mosques. Mustafa declared himself as a faithful Muslim, and claimed that the Muslims in Norway were great in numbers, and gave birth to more children than the Norwegians.

The letter was dated 8 July 1987, and read as follows:

To Carl I Hagen, Stortinget. From Mohammad Mustafa, underhaugsv. 15, 0354, Oslo 2
Allah is Allah, and Muhammad is his prophet! You struggle in vain Mr. Hagen! Islam, the only true faith, will gain victory here in Norway too. One day, mosques will be as common in Norway as churches are today, and my great-grandchildren will experience this. I know, and all Muslims in Norway know, that the population of Norway will come to the faith, and that this country will be Muslim! We give birth to more children than you, and several true-believing Muslims arrive in Norway every year, men in productive age. One day the infidel cross in the flag shall also go away!

== Aftermath ==
The tabloid newspaper Verdens Gang soon claimed they could prove that the letter was false. Since the letter was signed with full name and address, the newspaper was able to contact Mohammad Mustafa to investigate the matter. Mustafa denied having sent the letter, and also pointed out that he hadn't lived in the address mentioned in the letter for over a year. Mustafa reportedly expressed that he felt exploited by Carl I. Hagen, and that he considered legal steps. In late 1987, he filed suit against Hagen, with Tor Erling Staff as his lawyer. Staff demanded, on behalf of his client, compensation from Hagen and the Progress Party for 500,000 NOK. Staff claimed that Hagen knew the letter was false when he used it in the electoral campaign. Hagen himself however claimed that he didn't even know that any journalists were present at what was an internal party convention, and that it wasn't a deliberate stunt for the electoral campaign. The case went to the Oslo City Court in November 1988, and resulted in a settlement between the two parties.

The Progress Party almost doubled its share of the votes for the 1987 local election, compared to the local election in 1983. The nature of the letter has later been seen to have pioneered European anti-Islam rhetoric, which did not become more widespread until many years later.

== See also ==
- Trojan Horse scandal
