= Kazakhstan–Norway relations =

Bilateral relations

- Kazakhstan: Norway

Diplomatic relations between the Republic of Kazakhstan and the Kingdom of Norway were established on 5 June 1992. Kazakhstan maintains an embassy in Oslo, while Norway is represented in Kazakhstan through diplomatic and consular institutions.

== History ==
Diplomatic relations between Kazakhstan and Norway were established on 5 June 1992.

In April 2001, the President of Kazakhstan, Nursultan Nazarbayev, paid an official visit to Norway. During the visit, he met with Harald V, Prime Minister Jens Stoltenberg, Vice President of the Storting Hans Røsjorde, and representatives of Statoil. Nazarbayev also delivered a speech at the Norwegian Institute of International Affairs.

Between 2001 and 2004, the two countries signed several intergovernmental agreements, including a Convention for the Avoidance of Double Taxation and the Prevention of Fiscal Evasion with Respect to Taxes on Income and Capital, a Joint Declaration on the Further Development of Friendly Relations and Cooperation, and a Joint Statement on Dialogue and Cooperation in the Oil and Gas Sector.

In May 2004, the Prime Minister of Norway, Kjell Magne Bondevik, paid an official visit to Kazakhstan. During the visit, Bondevik and Nazarbayev signed a joint declaration on bilateral cooperation, and an Honorary Consulate of Norway in Kazakhstan was opened.

In 2010, Haakon, Crown Prince of Norway, visited Kazakhstan.

In October 2018, on the sidelines of the Asia–Europe Meeting (ASEM) Summit in Brussels, President Nazarbayev held talks with the Prime Minister of Norway, Erna Solberg.
