= Arve Lønnum Jr. =

Norwegian lawyer and politician

Arve Lønnum (born 21 October 1961) is a Norwegian lawyer and politician for the Progress Party.

He was born in Oslo as a son of Arve Lønnum Sr. and editor Mimi Rustad Wold. His father was a politician and professor in neurology at the University of Oslo.

He graduated from the University of Oslo with the cand.jur. degree in 1995, and thereafter spent his career in the lawyer's firm Ræder, Wisløff, Aasland & Co. He was a junior solicitor from 1995, then lawyer from 1997, then partner from 2001.

In politics, he was a member of Oslo city council from 1987 to 1995 and 2003 to 2007. He was leader of his party group from 1990 to 1991, and leader of the city chapter of his party from 2001 to 2002. From 1987 both he and his father were members of the city council, but his father died in 1988. Arve Lønnum Jr. was also a deputy representative to the Parliament of Norway during the term 1993–1997, and met during 110 days of parliamentary session. He was a board member of the Oslo Port Authority from 1996 to 1999.
