= Eivind H. Eckbo =

Norwegian politician, lawyer and farmer

Eivind Eckbo

Leader of the Anders Lange's Party
- In office 18 October 1974 – 26 May 1975
- Preceded by: Anders Lange
- Succeeded by: Arve Lønnum

Personal details
- Born: 10 August 1927 Oslo, Norway
- Died: 7 May 2017 (aged 89)
- Party: Progress Party

Eivind Higford Eckbo (10 August 1927 – 7 May 2017) was a Norwegian politician, lawyer and farmer.

== Biography ==
While working as a lawyer in Bø i Telemark, he stood as the second candidate of Anders Lange's Party on the Telemark ballot in the 1973 Norwegian parliamentary election. He was the interim chairman of Anders Lange's Party from the death of party chairman and founder Anders Lange in 1974, until 1975. He was later the deputy chairman and held other offices by the same party after it changed its name into the Progress Party.

== Personal life ==
He was married to Margaret Eckbo, also a politician for the Progress Party, of which she got introduced to through her husband. She had two children from before they got married, he had 7. Eckbo died on 7 May 2017, aged 89.
