= Anders Lange =

Norwegian politician (1904–1974)

Anders Lange MP
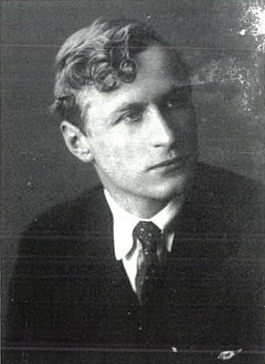
- Anders Lange in the 1930s.

Leader of the Anders Lange's Party
- In office 8 April 1973 – 18 October 1974
- Preceded by: Position established
- Succeeded by: Eivind Eckbo

Member of the Storting
- In office 1 October 1973 – 18 October 1974
- Constituency: Oslo

Personal details
- Born: 5 September 1904 Aker, Akershus, Norway
- Died: 18 October 1974 (aged 70) Bærum, Akershus, Norway
- Party: Anders Lange's Party
- Other political affiliations: Fatherland League (1929–38); Landsforeningen Norges Sjøforsvar (1938–40)
- Spouse(s): Anne-Marie Bach-Evensen, 1930–52 (divorced); Karin Thurmann-Moe, 1952–74 (his death)
- Children: Four

Anders Sigurd Lange (5 September 1904 – 18 October 1974) was a Norwegian political organiser, speaker and editor who led his eponymously named political party Anders Lange's Party into the Storting (Norwegian parliament) in 1973.

Educated as a forestry technician, Lange got involved in politics following his stay in Argentina in the late 1920s. He joined the right-wing Fatherland League organisation upon his return to Norway in 1929, and he became a popular speaker at public rallies. His provocative style however often led to controversies. Although his agitation was chiefly directed against the political left, he also rejected the efforts of the far-right. He left the organisation in 1938 to join Landsforeningen Norges Sjøforsvar, where he argued for strengthening the Norwegian armed forces and warned against the future world war. He was initially blocked from entering the organised Norwegian resistance during the Second World War, but nonetheless did work to assist resistance members, and he was arrested by the Germans and imprisoned twice.

After the war, Lange initially focused on his work as a kennel-owner, as well as to write and publish his own dog-owner's paper. Although he had pledged to not enter politics again, he became increasingly politically active. He started touring the country to speak at his public rallies, and the paper he published became increasingly political. He was a charismatic right-wing public speaker who first and foremost objected to high taxes, state-regulations and public bureaucracy. He gained a considerable following among youth in the 1960s, and their activities included to counter-demonstrate against left-wing demonstrations. Increasingly called upon by his supporters to establish a new political party, it was not until 1973 that he finally agreed to do so. The new party, named Anders Lange's Party (ALP) was founded by popular acclamation during a public meeting at Saga kino. He successfully entered the Norwegian Parliament after the election later the same year, but his new-found political career came to an abrupt end when he died the following year. Lange's political party was reformed and renamed to the Progress Party after his death.

== Early life ==
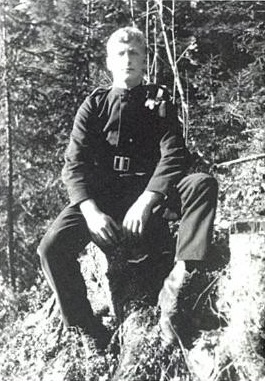
Anders Lange in the Royal Guards in 1924.

Anders Sigurd Lange was born in Nordstrand in Aker Municipality (now a part of Oslo) to doctor Alf Lange (1869–1929) and Anna Elisabeth Svensson (1873–1955). He had two older siblings, Alexander and Karen. Although he was born in Aker, the family moved to Foss in Bjelland Municipality when he was only six weeks old, owing to his father being appointed district physician for a region consisting of Bjelland Municipality, Grindheim Municipality and Åseral Municipality. The Lange family was originally from Holstein and Denmark, and included several prominent public officials, priests, doctors and businessmen. Lange lived in Foss for his first seven years. Lange's parents were divorced in 1911, and Anna Elisabeth moved to Bergen with her three children. They lived in humble conditions in a guest house in Fjøsanger for the first two to three years. The family thereafter moved to Kristiania (now named Oslo), settling in Skillebekk.

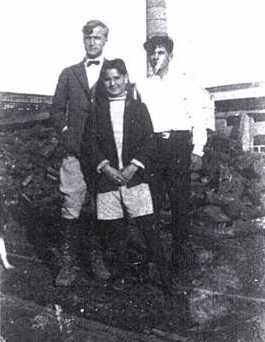
Anders Lange (seen standing back to the left) in Argentina in the late 1920s.

Lange started his secondary education at Vestheim School in 1921, but failed to graduate examen artium. He subsequently moved to Kristiansand in 1923, and finished his education at Kristiansand Cathedral School in 1924. He was not interested in politics in his youth, spending his free time in outdoor recreation and sports. In Kristiania (Oslo), Lange had played football and ice hockey for the club Mercantile SFK, and he continued to play football for FK Donn in Kristiansand. He broke his nose several times during play, giving him his characteristic crooked nose. Lange held his first public speech (albeit a short one), the Kristiansand russ speech, on 17 May 1924 in honour of Henrik Wergeland. He thereafter served in the Royal Guards for his conscription service.

During his time in the military, Lange became interested in forestry after reading the 1923 book Skogen og folket by Christian Gierløff. He graduated as a forestry technician at the forestry school in Oddernes Municipality in 1926. He had part of his practice in Andebu, and after graduating he continued working there for a local farmer. A cousin of his father later tipped him that he could get work at a forestry school in Argentina, and Lange set out for the country in 1927. He went to port in Buenos Aires, got in connection with Kristiansand-based Norwegians, and travelled north to Tartagal near the border to Paraguay. He became engaged with the Saco company, and headed a work team of 15 men. Lange had also brought with him football equipment to the country, and he became known by the locals as "Don André". Lange lived in Argentina from November 1927 to June 1929, when he went home with his father's casket, his father having died of a heart attack when visiting Lange at his office in Argentina.

== Political career ==
=== Interwar period ===
Lange began his political career in the Norwegian right-wing Fatherland League organisation, which had been founded in 1925 by prominent figures such as Christian Michelsen and Fridtjof Nansen. Lange received a letter from writer Olaf Benneche, supplemented with a letter from Nansen requesting him to come back to Norway and join the anti-communist movement, and he was invited to Nansen's property Polhøiden. According to Lange himself, it was communism that shaped his views. He had read about communism since his youth, and concluded that it was a "poison" that would destroy humans, take away their liberties and relinquish the independence of nations. Lange had also noted the stark political conflicts in Argentina during his stay in the country. His experience as an emigrant had led him to debunk what he saw as the left's negative view of patriotism (fedrelandskjærlighet). The growth of the left-wing labour movement at the same time caused a polarisation of Norwegian politics, and the Fatherland League's stated aim was to unite the political right against left-wing revolutionaries. Lange became secretary of the Fatherland League's Agder branch in 1929, and marked himself in the first year by writing op-eds in newspapers and speaking at public rallies.

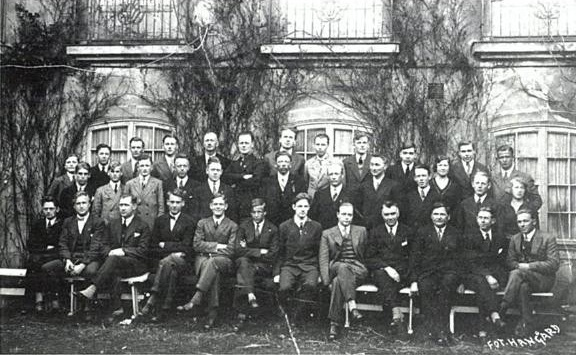
Representatives for the Fatherland League in 1932; Anders Lange sits as number two from the left in the front row.

In early 1933, when Vidkun Quisling was Defence Minister, Lange was scheduled to host him at a public rally that was endorsed by the Agrarian Party (of which Quisling was a member at the time). The event led Lange to get a complete distaste of him. Lange was set to drive Quisling to the rally, and already when they met Lange noted that Quisling seemed "as distracted as a St. Bernard," and that his handshake was "as limp as a sponge." Quisling did reportedly not say a single word during the five-mile drive to the rally, and his speech was a disaster due to his failure to speak audibly (he would not use a microphone). At the Fatherland League's subsequent national convention in 1933, a faction sought to tie the organisation closer to Quisling's then-newly founded party, but Lange loudly opposed the proposal and attacked Quisling as "the worst Defence Minister this country has ever had." Quisling left the Fatherland League following the convention. Although accused by the left of fascism, Lange distanced himself from the ideology, and instead considered it to "live on" through socialism and trade unions.

Lange's later activities consisted mainly of holding public rallies, and his provocative style often got him into physical altercations with left-wing labour activists. His most controversial stunt was in 1935, when he sought to "demonstrate" the Labour Party's attitude towards the existing society. Inspired by an earlier stunt of the Labour Party's youth organisation (AUF), Lange demonstratively stood above a volunteer soaked in pig's blood, lying over a truck, and "threatening" him with a hammer. The stunt led to clashes with AUF activists (Lange eventually broke his jaw), and as Lange's stunt had not been approved by neither the Fatherland League's local branch nor its central leadership, Lange was transferred to Oslo. He then held the position as national leader of the Fatherland League's youth organisation from 1935 to 1936. Lange was considered a great speaker, and his rhetoric changed between being largely gentle or more vulgar. During a 1935 speech, Lange warned against both socialism and Nazism, often alleging the "dictatorial tendencies" he saw in the Labour Party. He in turn criticised Norway for being "ripe for dictatorship," owing to Norwegians having "stopped thinking" and uncritically accepted "supervisory boards, editorials, propaganda and dozy parliamentarians." Lange travelled through most of the country to hold speeches, including Northern Norway.

Lange left the Fatherland League at the end of 1938, and joined Landsforeningen Norges Sjøforsvar ("Country Confederation for the Naval Defense of Norway") as its general secretary. The organisation's purpose was to inform about the importance for Norway of the sea, and thus of the Norwegian navy. Lange continued to travel around the country in order to show films and hold speeches. He agitated for strengthening the Norwegian Armed Forces, and increasingly warned against a possible world war, and how Norway could be pulled into it. Lange was dejected that the authorities did not take him seriously, and left-wing activists continued to disturb his meetings. He showed up at the last meeting of the organisation on 6 or 7 April 1940 with a Krag-Jørgensen rifle, telling the audience to "get ready for war," and asking rhetorically when Norway would arm its forces. Lange travelled to the Norwegian Parliament on 8 April 1940, and begged Labour Party MP Torvald Haavardstad to mobilise the Norwegian army. Haavardstad in turn responded that Lange should quit "this hysterical defence talk."

=== Second World War ===
On 9 April 1940, Norway was invaded by Nazi Germany. Part of the background for Lange's predictions about the future war was the letters he sent to several foreign heads of state, including Winston Churchill and Adolf Hitler. He asked in a letter what Hitler's plans were with his "Third Reich", and received response from German authorities that "Nazi Germany will triumph on all fronts." Lange had several Jewish friends, and considered their situation to be under such threat in 1939/40 that he thought they should escape before a German invasion of Norway. He managed to reserve 100 seats on the Norwegian America Line for Jews to escape, but none of the seats were taken. Lange and several of his friends from the Fatherland League were eager to join the resistance forces of the Norwegian Campaign, and they set out to Nordmarka on skis on 10 April. Lange had with him a machine gun and 1,000 bullets, but was forced to turn his weapon in when they met other resistance members. He was considered to be "not reliable" on account of his time in the Fatherland League, and he was left to ski back to Oslo. Lange became dejected and bitter as a result of his treatment, and he was left to think that the Labour Party, which he had criticised for not arming the defence before the invasion, had now also taken over control of Nordmarka.

Lange was imprisoned at Møllergata 19 in September 1940 for getting into a fight at Theatercaféen with Eyvind Mehle, an associate of Vidkun Quisling. The incident happened the day after Mehle had attacked King Haakon VII in a speech. Lange refused to greet Mehle when he came past his table, responding that "I don't greet Norway's greatest turd in another way than this," and then slapped Mehle in the face. Lange thereafter grabbed Mehle and threw him through a door twice. Lange refused to apologise to Mehle, and was captured by German police the following day. Lange was imprisoned for four months, and was released in early 1941. His house was searched several times by the Gestapo when he was in prison. On other occasions, Lange and his family also hid Norwegians who planned to escape to Sweden in their house. Following his release from prison, Lange assisted resistance members with information work. He thus came under investigation by the police, as he was "known for being an opponent of NS." In 1942 he was captured and imprisoned once more at Møllergata 19 after his house was raided by German police. It was during his times in prison that Lange started thinking seriously about practical politics. He was according to himself not tortured or abused in prison, but to his satisfaction he was left alone to just read books and think.

=== Postwar years ===
For the 1945 parliamentary election, Lange was offered to run for election by the Conservative Party, the Agrarian Party and the Labour Party, but he turned the offers down. Lange instead started working as the secretary of Norsk Kennel Klubb, a Norwegian dog-owner's club. He was also hired as a columnist in Morgenbladet, writing about the dog community every Monday. Lange moved to Svartskog, Oppegård with his family in late 1946, where he started working to establish a kennel. He thereafter quit his engagement for Morgenbladet as he started his own paper instead, Hundeavisen (lit. "dog paper"). At the time, there were no independent publications such as this for the dog community, and Lange went to great lengths to spread news about his paper. He (helped by his family) sent about 75,000 letters to dog owners, institutions and dog associations throughout the country, informing them about the new paper. The first issue was published in June 1948. He maintained that politics were to be "banished" from the paper, except for issues directly related to the dog community; he thus criticised the tax on dog-keeping, and the ban on dogs in Oslo tenements.

Although Lange had promised to quit politics after the war, he sought to restart the Country Confederation for the Naval Defense of Norway by late 1947. He thought that the Labour Party government had returned to the pre-war negligence of the Norwegian defence, and that it was a "tactic" by the "communists" in order to allow the Soviet Union to grow itself stronger. His attempt to start the organisation again did however not materialise. Instead of this, one of the main issues for Lange until the early 1950s was to agitate for animal rights. This in turn led him back to his earlier issues of criticising bureaucracy, state capitalism and socialism. He arranged a public meeting at Youngstorget for the first time in 1950, and was thereafter sponsored by an anonymous group to hold one hundred political speeches throughout the country. One time he gathered a crowd of 19,000 people on Youngstorget, who started chanting "Anders Lange, Norway needs you, Norway needs you." Lange himself was rather startled by the event, as he thought it recollected pre-war personality cults. He stopped touring in 1953 due to financial problems. He also stopped publishing the paper Hundeavisen in September 1953, as one of his associates had embezzled 70,000 kr from the paper's funding. Although Lange got most of the money back, the paper was not published for seven years.

Lange had great oratory talents, and he liked to consider himself a "demagogue" in the ancient Greek sense of the word. Lange planned a massive campaign with public speeches after the 1953 parliamentary election, but he was not able to raise the necessary funding. He largely stopped his political activities until 1959, when he again planned speeches at Youngstorget. Lange was often encouraged to start a political party during the 1950s, but he did not endorse the idea then. Although Lange kept contacts with all kinds of people, it was his contacts with businessmen and ship-owners that provided him with funds to keep up his political activities. During the 1960s, Lange was an immensely popular lecturer at secondary schools. He gained a considerable following among youth, and his followers were popularly called hundeguttene, the "dog boys." They were often from the right wing of the Young Conservatives, and they joined Lange for counter-demonstrations against meetings of the Socialist People's Party, May Day demonstrations, and protests against the Vietnam War.

In February 1960 the first issue of Hundeavisen was published after seven years. The paper, which originally was about dogs and animals, soon took a radical turn. The name of the paper was changed to Anders Langes Avis (Anders Lange's Newspaper) in 1962, and it gradually became increasingly political. In its last years it had turned into a solely political paper. In 1961 Lange founded the "Independence Party", but he did not register it publicly. Some of the issues for the "party" was to abolish direct taxes, sell state-owned companies, drastic cuts in public expenses, delegate tasks away from municipalities to the state, abandon the welfare system and cover it over the state budget, and revoke public employees' right to vote and run for parliament. The party held a counter-demonstration against a demonstration against the Bay of Pigs Invasion in Oslo in November 1962, and they handed out flyers in support of US President John F. Kennedy. The party changed name several times, to the "Independence Movement" in 1963, to the "Freedom Party" in 1965, and a few months later to "Anders Lange's Freedom Movement."

=== Anders Lange's Party ===
By the end of 1972 Lange felt a growing support for his views, and he was again asked to start a new political party. He nonetheless questioned if he had become too old, and he initially rejected the idea. Towards 1973 he however increasingly felt a revival of the time from the Fatherland League, and he became sufficiently inspired to start seriously discuss creating a new party. On 8 April 1973, Lange held a public meeting at the cinema Saga kino, which eventually turned into the founding meeting of a new party. Norwegian politics was in turmoil at the time, with voters disaffected six months after the Norwegian EC membership referendum and generally disgruntled with the mainstream centre-right as a viable alternative to the Labour Party. Lange held a two-hour speech at Saga kino, which resulted in the establishment of Anders Lange's Party for a Strong Reduction in Taxes, Duties and Public Intervention; usually shortened to Anders Lange's Party (ALP). The issues promoted before the meeting concerned taxes, regulations, alcohol policies, private property, reduction in foreign aid as well as the political leadership.

Lange thereafter again started touring and speaking at public rallies; he did not use a manuscript for his speeches. On 5 May, a crowd of 5,000 people turned up at Youngstorget to listen to Lange and his Danish counterpart Mogens Glistrup. On his first appearance in a political television debate, Lange showed up with a bottle of egg liqueur and a Viking sword he had received from Geirr Tveitt, and his appearance in the debate became a success. Lange was not a big drinker, but he used egg liqueur during speeches to clear his throat. His use of the drink nonetheless led sales of Advocaat to soar. Lange finally entered the Norwegian Parliament after the 1973 parliamentary election, together with three other representatives from his party. Lange set a record of speeches during his first year in parliament, speaking more than any other representative. He was elected into the Consumer and Administration Committee, which he dismissed as a redundant entity. During his time in parliament he came on good terms with politicians from all parties. Lange said he only felt hostility from Kåre Willoch, leader of the Conservative Party, whose presence he considered to "fill the room with hate;" Willoch had expressed little respect for Lange before the 1973 election, labeling him as a "mad-man" and agitator without visions.

Lange had originally intended to create a popular movement rather than a political party, and an internal conflict erupted over the nature of the party. Lange favoured the superiority of the parliamentary group instead of the party organisation. The wing led by Carl I. Hagen and Kristoffer Almås wanted a more effective party structure, and even wished to throw Lange as leader and change the party's name. After increasing pressure, during the party's first regular national convention in Hjelmeland Municipality in January 1974, Lange and his deputy Erik Gjems-Onstad were forced to give concessions that gave ALP the outlines of a regular party. Lange however continued voicing his opposition against the new development, while Hagen and Almås maintained their views on the leadership and naming issues. After initially indicating that he would grant Hagen his wish of being hired as party secretary, Lange later stated in Dagbladet that Hagen only would be hired "over my dead body." The conflict led Hagen and Almås to leave ALP in July, and Almås went on to form the Reform Party with Hagen as a passive member. The conflict was not resolved until October 1974, when Anders Lange died of heart failure following a heart attack. As Hagen had been elected as Lange's parliamentary deputy in 1973 he took over Lange's place as member of parliament.

Hagen later became leader of the party and reformed it as the Progress Party. As the party had grown to become the second largest in Norway, an oil painting portraying Lange was in 2005 put up and unveiled in the big conference room in the Norwegian parliament by Hagen and future leader Siv Jensen.

== Political views ==
Lange supported the economic policies of Milton Friedman. When questioned during the 1973 parliamentary election about who his "political philosopher" was, Lange responded succinctly "Ayn Rand and Milton Friedman". He also said that his motto was "stand on your own feet, and not on others'." Lange voted in favour of the European Economic Community (mostly for military reasons), but he was satisfied that Norway did not join it following the 1972 referendum. This was as he expressed concern that the EEC would likely develop into a massive bureaucracy, and that France in his mind probably would misuse it due to the French "need to dominate."

Guttorm Hansen, who was the President of the Parliament of Norway when Lange was a Member of Parliament, once said that he believed Lange's apparent goal was to "make [Parliament] into a political circus with himself as the main clown." Lange said many unexpected things in Parliament. He once bragged about his own potency, and another time spoke about how much moonshine he had consumed in his lifetime, and how terrible it was. He was also censored for the use of unparliamentary language.

Anders Lange wrote in 1963: "Everyone who claims black majority rule in South Africa are traitors of the white race. No vote rights for negroes; Stop mixed marriages, No humanitarian aid for blacks."

== African relations ==
Starting in 1962, Lange began promoting South Africa and Rhodesia in his paper. One of his main motivations was fears that the countries would turn communist, and he was critical of what he considered to be a one-sided and biased presentation of the conditions in the countries. He also had several Norwegian friends in South Africa who traded and did business in the country, and who also considered information about the country in Norway to be naïve and one-sided. Lange said that he received his information about the countries from numerous Norwegian, American and African magazines.

Lange was on several occasions visited by South Africans in Norway, both friends of Norwegian ancestry and people with central positions in the country, including General Charles Edward More. Lange and his wife Karin visited the country in early 1972 for three weeks, the trip having been arranged by long-time family friend Major John M. Gray. Their flight was welcomed by government representatives at an airport 50 kilometers outside Pretoria, and he met with prominent figures such as head of the Department of Information Eschel Rhoodie. He also met the leader of the Progressive Party, a party Lange praised for being the purest capitalist party in the world. He was also impressed with what he saw in the country, including the Bantu chiefs he met. Lange also advocated that Norway should recognize Ian Smith's Rhodesia, an internationally unrecognized state. He wrote to Smith that Anders Langes Avis was the only paper in Norway that consistently supported his regime and sent issues of his paper to the Rhodesian Department of External Services. In response his paper received greetings and thanks from Smith and Rhodesian government officials.

In March 1979 as part of the Muldergate Scandal, the British newspaper The Guardian wrote that Lange and ALP had received 180,000 NOK from a secret South African fund. In December 1981, Gordon Winther claimed that ALP and Lange had received about 400,000 NOK since 1972. People who had been close to Lange however rejected that he had received money from the South African government. In a letter from 1967, Lange however notes that he would be delighted if he would get funds from South Africa (which he in any event had not received by that time), while another anonymous person who had been close to Lange claimed that he did indeed receive money, even to the point that it saved him from financial ruin.

== Personal life ==
Lange married Anne-Marie Bach-Evensen (1906–1967) in 1930. They had exchanged letters when Lange was in Argentina, and became a couple soon after his return to Kristiansand, where she lived. They had three children. Anne-Marie got diabetes right before the German invasion, and she became very ill. This left Lange with more responsibilities of keeping in charge of their house and children. Although the family was poorly off itself during the war, they regularly invited homeless people into their house for oatmeal soup. Lange and his family moved to a farm in Tomter, Østfold, where they rented a house from October 1941 to 1946. During the war, Lange was hired as forest manager for the Løvenskiold family, and worked at their estate for two years.

Frederik Macody Lund, who had died in 1943, had long considered Lange to be his "adoptive son" as he had no children himself. As his first wife Augusta died in 1946, Lange inherited Svartskog in Oppegård, an 80 decare forest property. There, he established a kennel which he named Macody Lunds Minde-Vildmark, in honour of his late patron. In 1949 Lange however started seeing his neighbours' 21-year-old nanny. He filed for divorce from his wife Anne-Marie at the end of 1950, and the divorce was finalised on 18 February 1952. Lange thus moved from Svartskog, leaving it to Anne-Marie, and planned to marry his new girlfriend. They were engaged in 1951, but the relationship fast broke apart. Lange thereafter met Karin Thurmann-Moe (1927–1978), and they married on 17 June 1952, just two months after they first met. They had one child. In late 1952 Lange bought a 22 decare farm with a kennel, Trollstein in Heggedal, Asker. He received financial support to buy the property from a circle around the libertarian organisation Libertas. In addition to dogs, they had geese, hens, cows and pigs at Trollstein, and they grew potatoes and vegetables for their own use.

In January 1972, Lange unsuccessfully sought appointment as the broadcast manager of the Norwegian Broadcasting Corporation.

Anders Lange died of heart failure at Bærum Hospital on 18 October 1974, following a heart attack at Asker Station on 10 October.

== Writing ==
Lange was the author and editor of some publications:

- Editor of Hundeavisen (1948–53 and 1960–61)
- Editor of Anders Langes Avis (1962–74)

== Bibliography ==
- Eide, Torbjørn; Lange, Anders (1974). Anders Lange som han var. Lyche. ISBN 978-82-7008-083-0.
- Iversen, Jan Martin (1998). Fra Anders Lange til Carl I. Hagen: 25 år med Fremskrittspartiet. Oslo: Millenium. ISBN 82-517-8949-4.
- Rygnestad, Arild; Kvanmo, Hanna (1993). Anders Langes saga. Oslo: Samlaget. ISBN 82-521-4092-0.
