= School Election Project =

Mock elections in Norway

The School Election Project is a project started in 1989 that co-ordinates mock high school elections in Norway in connection with national and local elections in Norway. The mock elections are held in the weeks prior to the ordinary elections, and the results are published a couple of days before the election and draw much attention from media and political analysts. They often predict the tendency in the ordinary elections.

== History ==
High school mock elections in connection with ordinary political elections became common in Norway in the 1980s. They were initially arranged by the Workers' Youth League, sometimes in a cooperation with Norwegian Young Conservatives.

Before the 1989 Norwegian parliamentary election, political journalist in NRK Geir Helljesen initiated a co-ordination of the mock elections that various high schools held. This was done with assistance from the Ministry of Education and with use of the IBM election system that was developed for the ordinary elections. The result from the first election was published and debated by NRK and newspapers.

The elections were from the start arranged in the same way as traditional elections with ballots and ballot boxes. The results were called in to the project's headquarters. Since 2001, the results have been reported via internet. Since 2003, there have been various pilot projects to let students vote electronically.

== The elections ==
The project is open to all high schools in Norway and normally about 70% of the schools participate in the elections. They are normally preceded by a debate with politicians from the different youth parties. In 2011, the debates were canceled because the election took place only a few months after the 2011 Norway attacks. Instead, it was held elections square where the different parties had stands where they presented themselves to the students. In 2013, schools either held debates, elections markets or a combination of both. The election debates are often more ideological and confrontational than ordinary political debates. They have been criticised for being populistic and circus-like.

The project is financed by the Norwegian Directorate for Education and Training. Norwegian Social Science Data Services are responsible for arranging the elections.

== Survey ==
The project also includes a survey which about 20% of the schools take part in. A similar survey is conducted among the general population, in order to compare the youth to them. Likewise the youth cohort is compared over time.

== Election results ==
The result of the high school elections tend to predict the result in the ordinary elections, but are not completely compatible as the trends in the high school election is often more extreme, and the students more often vote for wing parties. Since 1983, and including three school elections before the co-ordinated project started, the Labour Party has been largest in 6 elections. The right wing Progress Party, the Socialist Left Party and the Labour Party have won four elections each. The Conservative Party has won two elections, being the largest party in the 2013 election for the first time since 1987.

| Year | Largest party |
|---|---|
| 1983 | Labour Party |
| 1985 | Labour Party |
| 1987 | Conservative Party |
| 1989 | Progress Party |
| 1991 | Socialist Left Party |
| 1993 | Socialist Left Party |
| 1995 | Labour Party |
| 1997 | Labour Party |
| 1999 | Socialist Left Party |
| 2001 | Socialist Left Party |
| 2003 | Progress Party |
| 2005 | Progress Party |
| 2007 | Labour Party |
| 2009 | Progress Party |
| 2011 | Labour Party |
| 2013 | Conservative Party |
| 2015 | Labour Party |

Results by year

| Party | 2015 | 2013 | 2009 | 2005 | 2001 | 1997 | 1993 | 1989 |
|---|---|---|---|---|---|---|---|---|
| Red | 4,8 | 3,7 | 4,8 | - | - | - | - | - |
| Socialist Left | 7,5 | 5,1 | 10,3 | 16,6 | 23,5 | 14,2 | 18,9 | 13,7 |
| Labour | 31,9 | 23,2 | 23,4 | 21,7 | 11,7 | 22,1 | 17,2 | 19,6 |
| Centre | 5,5 | 4 | 5,8 | 7,2 | 4,6 | 7,1 | 16,6 | 5,6 |
| Green | 6,7 | 3,7 | 1,3 | 1,0 | 1,0 | 1,7 | 1,0 | 1,8 |
| Christian Democratic | 3,2 | 2,9 | 3,7 | 3,7 | 6,1 | 7,3 | 4,5 | 4,6 |
| Liberal | 6,5 | 6,6 | 6,0 | 3,1 | 3,5 | 6,2 | 5,1 | 7,1 |
| Conservative | 16,4 | 28,3 | 16,2 | 11,6 | 16,4 | 10,7 | 14,5 | 20,9 |
| Progress | 10,5 | 15,6 | 24,0 | 25,2 | 14,1 | 19,4 | 11,2 | 22,0 |
| Pirate Party | 4,1 | 4,3 | - | - | - | - | - | - |
