= Reform Party (Norway, 1974) =

Reform Party Reformpartiet
- Leader: Carl I. Hagen
- Founded: 31 August 1974
- Dissolved: 26 May 1975*
- Split from: Anders Lange's Party
- Merged into: Anders Lange's Party
- Membership: 700 (1975 claim)
- Ideology: Right-wing populism National conservatism
- Political position: Right-wing
- Politics of Norway; Political parties; Elections; *One faction of the party kept on until at least 1977.

The Reform Party (Norwegian: Reformpartiet) was a short-lived political party in Norway. The party was founded in August 1974 by "moderate" defectors from Anders Lange's Party. Led by Carl I. Hagen, the party merged back into ALP already in May 1975, after Hagen—as Anders Lange's deputy—had become a Member of Parliament following Lange's sudden death in October 1974.

== History ==
The Reform Party was founded in Voksenåsen in Oslo on 31 August 1974 by Kristofer Almås, Deputy Member of Parliament Carl I. Hagen and others who broke away from Anders Lange's Party. They claimed that Lange was an "extremist", and criticised what they considered as his unwillingness of taking political responsibility, consistent refusal of political moderation and of establishing a political program. When Anders Lange died in October 1974, Hagen became a regular Member of Parliament as Lange's former deputy, and thus gave the Reform Party parliamentary representation.

In opinion polls carried out in January and February 1975, the Reform Party saw its support at 0.4%. On 13 May 1975, the party was split after Almås had been thrown as party chairman by the party board, and in turn reorganised the party under an "interim board" with himself as party chairman. Hagen responded by stating that he held control of the party finances and its membership rolls counting 700 members. On 26 May 1975, Hagen reconciled with his former party, and merged the Reform Party back into ALP at a meeting with the party's parliamentary leader Erik Gjems-Onstad.

In January 1976, Almås claimed that Hagen almost single-handedly had made a deal to merge into ALP, and that the "new board" had come together and issued a demand for Hagen to return the party's membership roll. Hagen in turn maintained the legitimacy of the party's merger with ALP. On 26 October 1976, Almås withdrew from his position as party chairman (although he remained a member), as well as politics in its entirety, as he claimed to have been subject to massive harassment as a result of "incorrect" coverage of the events surrounding the party by the mass media. On 19 January 1977, the party secretary, Peter N. Myhre, announced that he also withdrew from his position, after a meeting intended to solve the crisis in the party (where 17 members showed up) reportedly only resulted in quarrels and name-calling.
