= Carl I. Hagen =

Norwegian politician

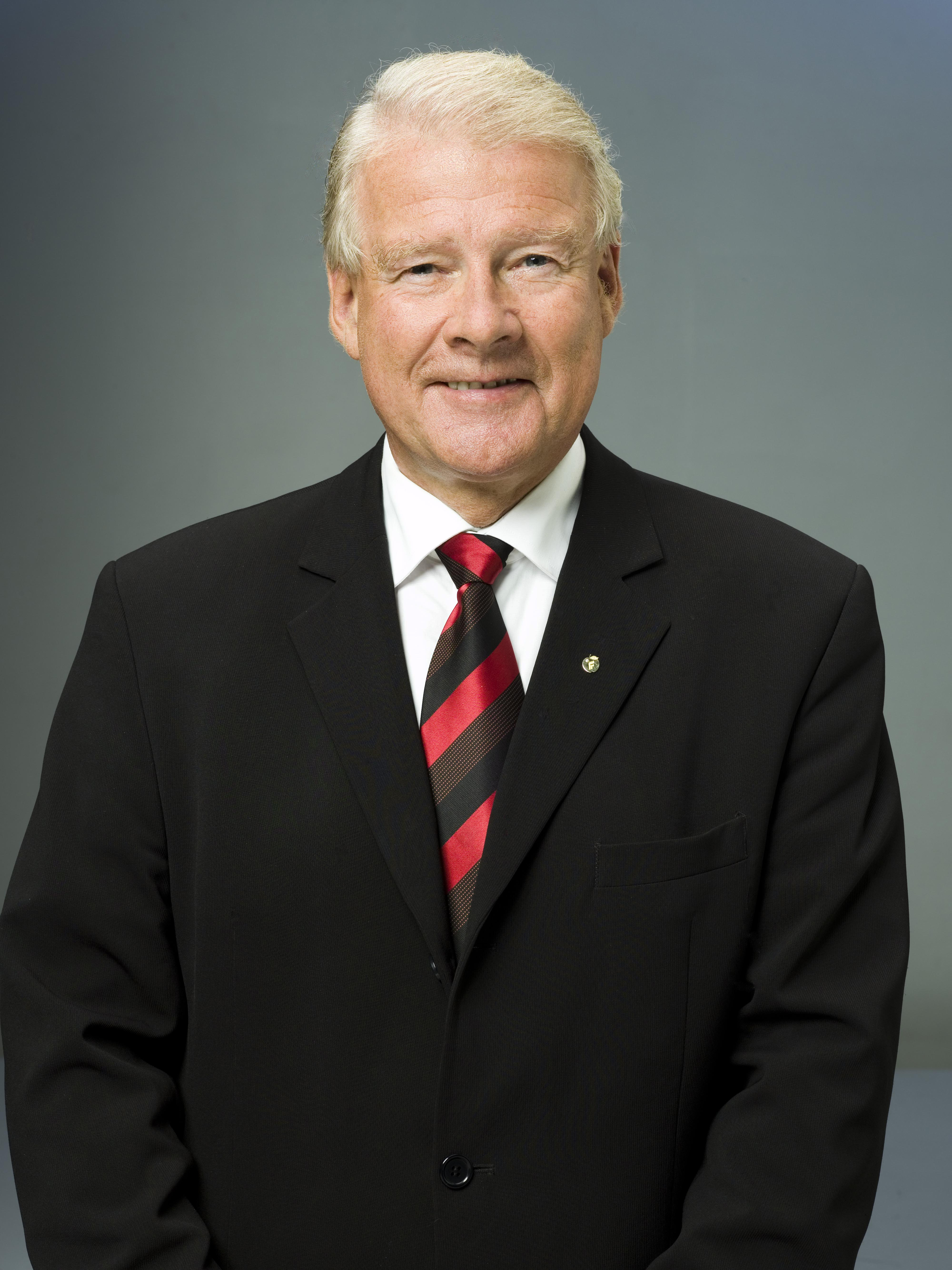

Vice President of the Storting
- In office 10 October 2005 – 30 September 2009
- President: Thorbjørn Jagland
- Preceded by: Inge Lønning
- Succeeded by: Øyvind Korsberg

Leader of the Progress Party
- In office 11 February 1978 – 6 May 2006
- Preceded by: Arve Lønnum
- Succeeded by: Siv Jensen

Member of the Norwegian Parliament for Oslo
- In office 18 October 1974 – 30 September 1977
- Preceded by: Anders Lange
- In office 1 October 1981 – 30 September 2009

Parliamentary Leader of the Progress Party
- In office 2 October 1981 – 5 October 2005
- Leader: Himself
- Preceded by: Harald Slettebø
- Succeeded by: Siv Jensen

Member of the Norwegian Parliament
- In office 1 October 2021 – 30 September 2025
- Constituency: Oppland

Personal details
- Born: 6 May 1944 (age 82) Oslo, Reichskommissariat Norwegen
- Party: Progress
- Spouse(s): Nina Aamodt (1970–1975); Eli Hagen (1983–present)
- Children: 2
- Education: Sunderland Technical College

Military service
- Allegiance: Norway
- Branch/service: Norwegian Army

Carl Ivar Hagen (born 6 May 1944) is a Norwegian politician and former Vice President of the Storting, the Norwegian parliament. He was the leader of the Progress Party from 1978 to 2006, when he stepped down in favour of Siv Jensen. Under his leadership, he was the undisputed leader and, in many ways, personally controlled its ideology and policies.

Hagen has since been regarded by both political scientists, and political colleagues and rivals alike as one of the greatest politicians in Norwegian history for his ability to build a hugely successful party up from scratch and his significant impact on Norwegian politics. He has been described as the first postmodern politician in Norway. While his ideology is classical liberalism with some conservatism, his political style has been described as right-wing populist.

== Early life ==
Hagen was born in 1944 during the German occupation of Norway to CEO Ragnar Hagen (1908–1969) and accountant Gerd Gamborg (1914–2008). He was named after his paternal grandfather, Carl, and his maternal grandfather, Ivar. He has two siblings, one younger, and one older sister. Hagen was before joining the Progress Party a passive member of the Young Conservatives, and according to him, both his parents voted for the Labour Party. According to Hagen himself and his secondary school classmates, he was relatively shy in his younger years. When he was seventeen years old, in 1961, he took work as an apprentice on the Norwegian America Line ship MS Foldenfjord. He achieved Examen artium in 1963. In 1964, he was conscripted in the Norwegian Army, and served as an engineer soldier at Eggemoen near Hønefoss, and Maukstadmoen in Troms.

After this, he left Norway for England. Originally wanting to become an engineer, he flunked mathematics in Sunderland and chose to study marketing and business studies in Newcastle instead, earning a Higher National Diploma in Business Studies in 1968. From being more reserved in his youngest days, he soon became a player in Northern English student politics. In 1967 he fought over the office of vice president of the National Union of Students against Jack Straw (later Labour Party MP and Secretary of State for Justice of the UK).

Prior to dedicating his professional life to politics, Hagen was CEO at Tate & Lyle Norway from 1970 to 1974, and after falling out of parliament between 1977 and 1981, consultant of Finansanalyse from 1977 to 1979, and economic policy consultant in the oil industry from 1979 to 1981.

== Political career ==
Hagen has explained that he lost faith in the Conservative Party as an alternative to social democracy during the Per Borten cabinet (1965–1971), when taxes and the power of the state increased more than under Labour. Hagen, in contrast, wanted to reduce the power of the state over individuals, and the political views of Anders Lange were because of this appealing to him.

Hagen began his political career when, in 1973, he became a deputy representative in the Storting for the newly formed Anders Lange's Party. He had attended the founding meeting of the party at Saga kino in April 1973 and had been asked by deputy leader Erik Gjems-Onstad if he wanted to stand for election for the party. Hagen, however, soon also lost faith in Anders Lange, albeit for other reasons, and along with some other party "moderates" in 1974, he broke away and formed the short-lived Reform Party. Later that year, after a year in parliament, Anders Lange died of a heart attack, resulting in Hagen becoming an MP, as he had been elected as Lange's deputy to parliament. The Reform Party returned to and merged with Anders Lange's Party the next year. In 1977, the party changed its name to the Progress Party, and Hagen was elected leader of the party in the 1978 national convention. As the party failed to get any representatives elected in 1977, Hagen was away from parliament for four years but he was elected in 1981.

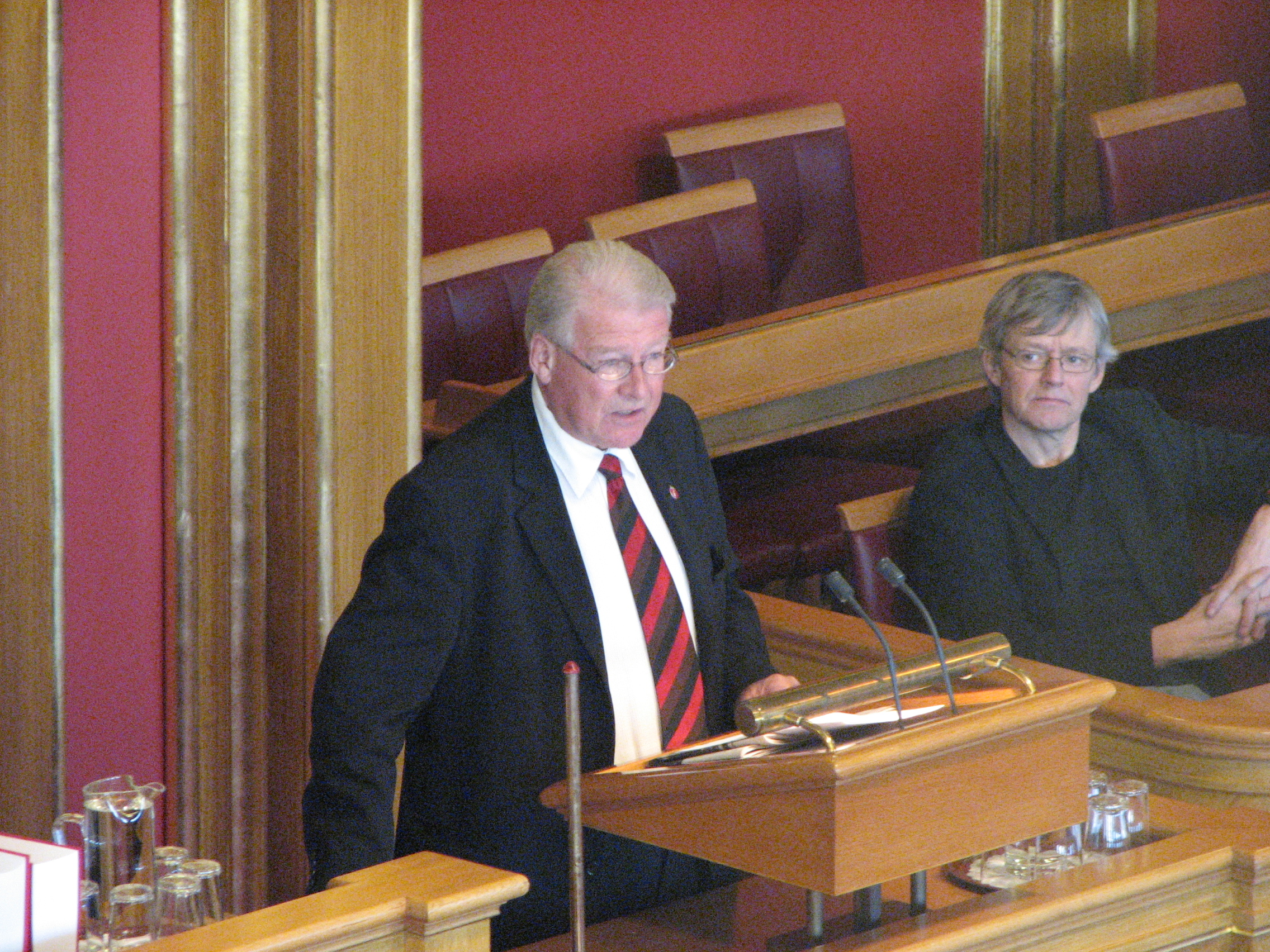
Carl I. Hagen speaking in the Storting in February 2009.

Hagen has been regarded as the first postmodern politician in Norway by Gudleiv Forr, writing for the Norsk biografisk leksikon. His early success has been attributed to his ability to use the media in his favour by populist speeches. He also somewhat managed to moderate the profile of the party from the more vulgar tone of Anders Lange. Though he identifies himself as a classical liberal, his political practice has been described by political commentators as being populist. His ability to balance different political directions was seen by Forr as displaying "his mastering of the role of being party leader." Forr also claimed that Hagen has a talent of double communication, which has left the diverse voter group of the party with different impressions of the policies of the party, which sometimes led to internal schisms. His success has also been attributed to his leadership tactics, which included suspending and removing members of the party who deviated too much from his views.

Hagen was elected into parliament for seven consecutive four-year periods from 1981 until he stepped down and decided not to run for the 2009 election. In 1979 to 1982, 1987 to 1991 and 1995 to 1999, he was also a member of Oslo's city council. In 2005, Hagen was chosen as Vice President of the Storting, and held the position until he left Storting, in 2009. In 2006, he stepped down as party leader in favour of Siv Jensen. Part of the decision not to run for re-election, which he had made in 2007, apart from reaching the age of pension, was because Hagen had felt that he had been put on the sideline after retiring as party leader. He also said that he wanted more time to relax and to work as a consultant. After ending his high-profile political career, he started working for the public relations agency Burson-Marsteller in 2009, where he became among the company's highest-paid lecturers.

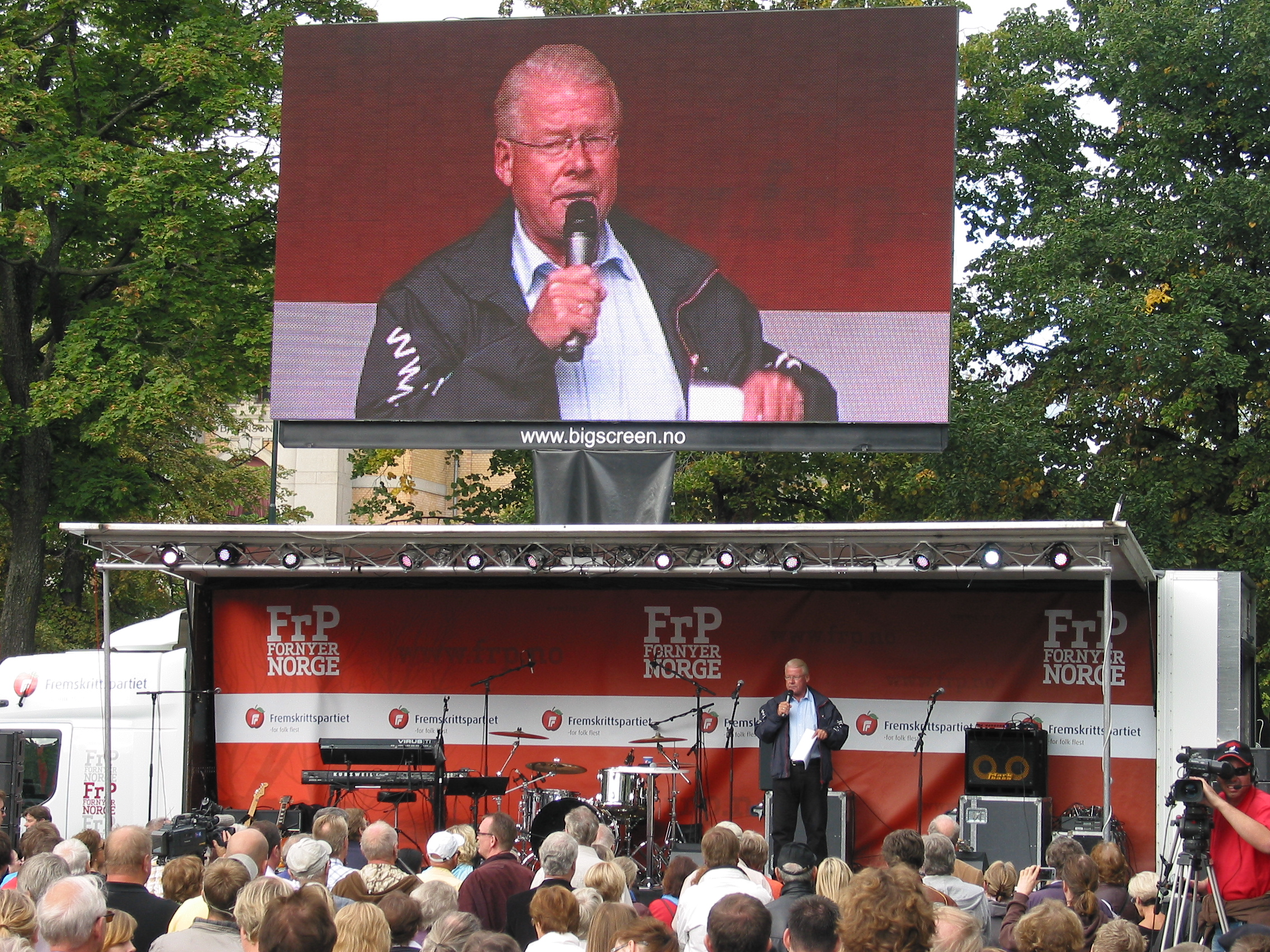
Carl I. Hagen speaking at a rally in Oslo as the Progress Party "senior general" before the 2009 parliamentary election.

In March 2010 it was however speculated about his comeback into Norwegian politics, as "central Progress Party politicians" wanted him to run for mayor of Oslo. Hagen himself did not entirely repudiate that thought and stated that he missed politics, as well as himself sunce he thought that politics had become boring without him. In September 2010, Hagen announced his candidacy for the office of mayor of Oslo for the 2011 local elections, and he quit his engagement with Burson-Marsteller. After receiving bleak polling figures, Hagen effectively dropped out of the race three days before the election.

In an internal party meeting on 9 November 2011, Hagen attempted to be chosen as the Progress Party's representative in the Norwegian Nobel Committee, and in response, he withdrew from the party's central board as well as from his position as "senior general". After the meeting, he published a five-page note, criticising Siv Jensen and citing his resignation to be because of the "treatment and humiliation" that he received from the "party leadership".

In April 2013, Hagen and Jensen declared that the conflict between them had been resolved. Hagen remains active in the public political debate, often criticising his own party, especially after it joined the Erna Solberg cabinet in 2013, the party's first-ever participation in government.

Hagen was re-elected to the Storting at the 2021 parliamentary election for Oppland. At the time of his election, he became the oldest elected Storting representative since 1927. On his 80th birthday in 2024, he announced that he would not seek re-election at the 2025 election.

== Political views ==
The claim that the Progress Party is populist dates back to a motion of no confidence in 1986 for the Conservative Party prime minister, Kåre Willoch. During the parliamentary election campaign in 1985, the Progress Party had promised not to contribute to a socialist government. After the Conservative-led government proposed to increase petrol taxes, however, Hagen pulled his support for the government, which led to the formation of a Labour Party government.

In July 2016, Hagen endorsed Donald Trump for President of the United States, calling him "a man of the people" and comparing him to Ronald Reagan.

During an interview with the conservative document.no, Hagen stated that he identifies as economically liberal and nationally conservative. However, he clarified that he would not describe himself as a national conservative but rather as a (nasjonalliberalistisk; "national liberal", "national libertarian").

=== Immigration and Islam ===
Hagen has been accused of playing on domestic fears of foreigners and immigrants. Largely because of those populist views on immigration, political opponents of the Progress Party have repeatedly resorted to physical assaults on Hagen.

He is especially known for having presented several accusations against Muslims as well as Islam as a religion. In the 1987 election campaign, during a party convention, Hagen read aloud the "Mustafa Letter" (it was later revealed to be a forgery that, according to staff, Hagen was completely aware of), which portrayed the future Islamisation of Norway. The election in turn became a major electoral breakthrough for the party.

In 2004, Hagen delivered a speech at a convention of the independent Christian organisation Levende Ord in which he stated that "we Christians are very much concerned with children. Jesus said, let the small children come to me. I can't understand that Muhammad could have said the same. In the case that he could have said the same, it would have been: Let the small children come to me, so that I can exploit them in my struggle to Islamify the world." He also said that if Israel lost the fight in the Middle East, Europe would "bow under to Islam" if Muslim fundamentalists get it as they want: "They have, in the same manner as Hitler, long ago made it clear that the long-term plan is to Islamify the world. They have come a long way, they have pierced deep into Africa, and have come a long way into Europe – and then we have to fight back." He was because of the speech criticised by politicians and religious leaders in Norway. Some days later, the ambassadors of Pakistan, Indonesia, Egypt and Morocco and the chargé d'affaires of Tunisia made an unusually-strong attack on Hagen in a letter in the newspaper Aftenposten.

Hagen has also been praised for pointing to problematic aspects of immigration. In 2009, he received a "bridge builder award" from the Norwegian-Pakistani committee for the celebration of the Pakistani Independence Day in Norway, for his "strong engagement in integration politics."

=== Media ===
Hagen has been critical of the media. He gave the Norwegian Broadcasting Corporation, whose abbreviation is NRK, the nickname "ARK" ("Arbeiderpartiets Rikskringkasting"), a pun that is meant to be understood as the "Labour Party Broadcasting Corporation". He considers it and other media to be biased against the Progress Party. In the 2009 parliamentary election, he stated that the election had seen the worst case of media bias against the Progress Party and that the Norwegian media had been able to control the election campaign more than before against those they interrupt during debates, the issues that they choose to ask the different parties and whom they invite to join the debates.

== Books ==
=== Ærlig talt: Memoarer 1944–2007 (2007) ===
Ærlig talt was mainly written as Hagen's personal memoirs, and particularly described his political career. According to Cappelen Damm, Hagen writes "openly about his strategic choices, about central political processes, conflicts and victories – and about how they formed him and the party." He was also described as an "experienced and outspoken politician" who in his book was "hard-hitting, straight to the chase – and with continued willingness and ability to provoke." The book also contains, among other things, Hagen's personal characterisations of several political opponents.

Hagen started the presentation of his book by talking about circumstances in the 2001 Terje Søviknes sex-scandal. In the book, he also compared what he saw as a similar naïvety in the modern Norwegian immigration policy, and Neville Chamberlain's failed negotiations with Adolf Hitler in the prelude to the Second World War. When discussing the aftermath of the Jyllands-Posten Muhammad cartoons controversy, he wrote that the management by the Norwegian government led freedom of speech to be "subordinated to the respect for the warlord, man of violence and female abuser Muhammad, who murdered and accepted rape as a conquest technique." This was criticized by the Islamic Council Norway for "insulting Muslims", a reaction Hagen considered to be "as expected."

=== Klar tale (2010) ===
Klar tale is a debate book, where Hagen wrote his personal opinions. In the book, Hagen claimed that the policies used by the socialist parties were destroying the welfare state, by using poor solutions. He devoted much space to criticize "the budgetary rule" (handlingsregelen), which he claimed was preventing the development in Norway. He also criticized Prime Minister Jens Stoltenberg's "bragging" of Norway having the lowest unemployment figures in Europe after the financial crisis, which Hagen saw as obvious, given Norway's oil wealth.

Hagen also discussed possible difficulties in potential government cooperation between the Progress and Conservative Party. He cited conflicts among "strong individuals" in both parties. Politically, he warned the Progress Party particularly against "giving in" regarding the immigration policy, which he said was one of the most important issues for the party, and that the party in such a scenario would fall rapidly in polls, and lose credibility. He also believed that "if nothing is done", Norway risk the emergence of "a Rosengård", and proposed for volunteers to take care of asylum seekers instead of the state, which he in turn believed would "likely rapidly stop the flow of asylum seekers to Norway."

He also rejected the notion of man-made climate change, which he called the "climate hoax", citing the 3–4 percentage of human produced CO2 to hardly be significant to general climate changes. He also proposed for the Progress, Labour and Conservative Party to agree on increasing the electoral threshold to five percent, so that several of the smaller parties would fall out of parliament.

== Personal life ==
Hagen married Nina Aamodt (born 17 January 1945) in 1970. They had two children and were divorced in 1975, according to Hagen as a consequence of his political work. After some years of cohabitation, in 1983 he was married again, to Eli Aas, herself also a divorcee and mother of two. She became Hagen's closest political co-worker and advisor through his political career. As of August 2009, Hagen has seven grandchildren.

Major Carl-Axel Hagen (instructor at the War College in Oslo) is a son of his.

After living in Nøtterøy Municipality for years, Hagen and his wife moved back to Oslo in 2006. They also own a cabin in Sande Municipality in Vestfold.

His favorite musician is Elvis Presley, and he enjoys playing tennis.

== Works ==
- Ærlighet varer lengst (autobiography). Oslo. 1984.
- Ærlig talt: memoarer 1944–2007 (autobiography). Cappelen. 2007.
- Klar tale. Cappelen. 2010.

== Sources ==
- Ekeberg, Jan Ove; Snoen, Jan Arild (2001). Kong Carl, en uautorisert biografi (biography). Kagge.
- Iversen, Jan Martin (1998). Fra Anders Lange til Carl I. Hagen. Oslo: NW Damm & Søn.
- Krogh, Lars Jacob (2003). Et festskrift til Carl I. Hagen (biography). Oslo: Fremskritt.
- Moen, Elisabeth Skarsbø (2006). Profet i eget land (biography). Oslo: Gyldendal.
