= Inger-Marie Ytterhorn =

Norwegian politician (1941–2021)

Inger-Marie Ytterhorn (18 September 1941 – 30 March 2021) was a Norwegian politician for the Progress Party.

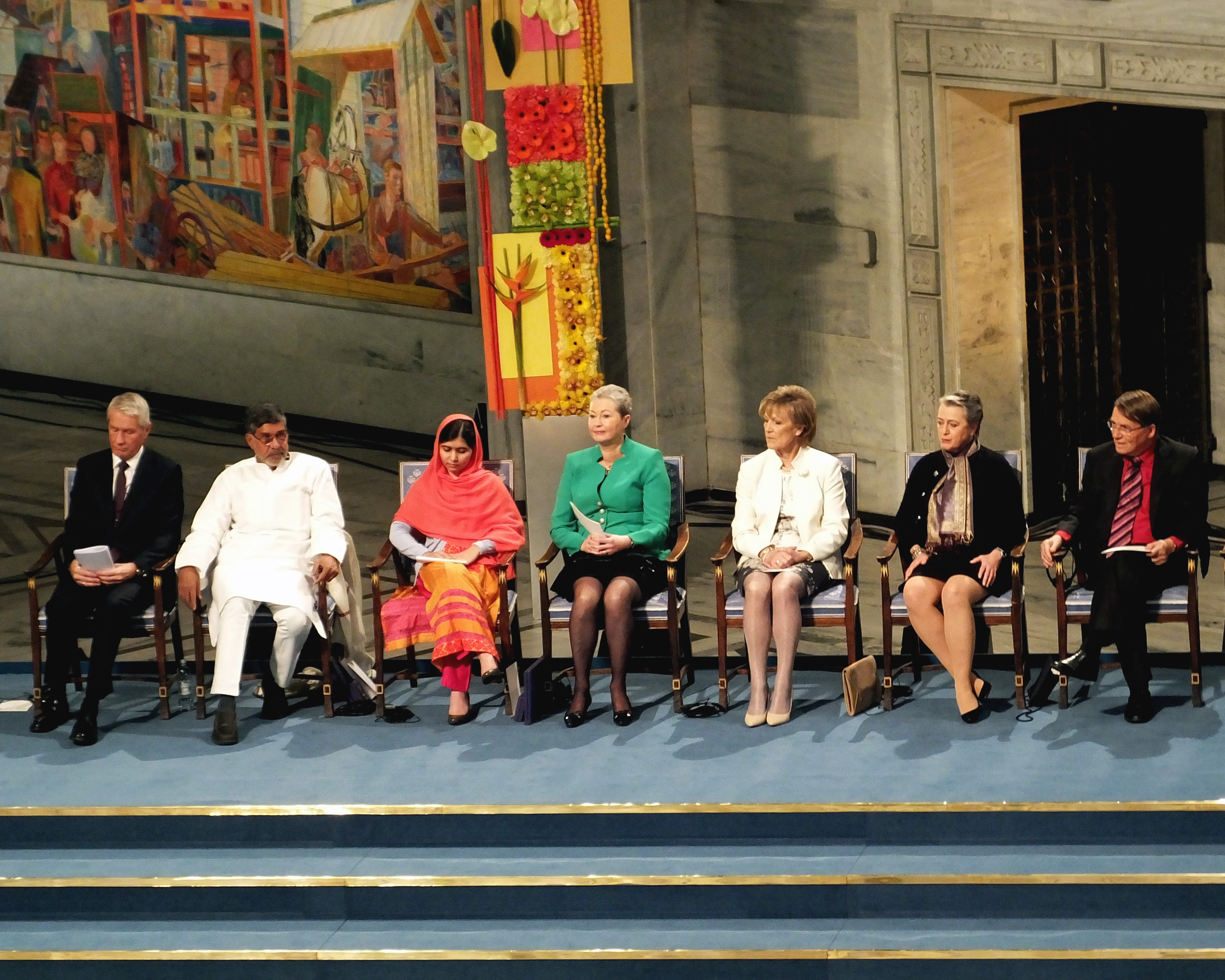

== Political career ==
Ytterhorn was elected to the Norwegian Parliament from Hordaland in 1989, but was not re-elected in 1993. She later served in the position of deputy representative during the terms 1993–1997 and 1997–2001.

Her husband Bjørn Erling Ytterhorn was also a member of the Norwegian Parliament.

She was a member of the Norwegian Nobel Committee, the body that awards The Nobel Peace Prize, for 18 years, from 2000 to 2017.

== Awards ==
- 2003 – Fjøslykta, an honorary prize awarded by the Progress Party.

== Death ==
Ytterhorn died on 30 March 2021, 79 years old.
