= Hans J. Røsjorde =

Norwegian politician

Member of Parliament

Member of the Norwegian Parliament for Hordaland
- In office 1989–2001

Personal details
- Born: 11 November 1941 (age 84) Brunlanes Municipality, Vestfold, Reichskommissariat Norwegen (today Norway)
- Party: Progress Party
- Education: University of Oslo
- Profession: Teacher

Hans Johan Røsjorde (born 11 November 1941) is a Norwegian politician for the Progress Party. A former member of parliament specializing in defense matters, Røsjorde has resigned from active politics and served as County Governor of Oslo and Akershus from 2001 to 2011.

== Early life and education ==
Born in Brunlanes Municipality, Vestfold, Røsjorde was the son of Josef A. Røsjorde (1917–1993) and Torborg Haugene (1915–1953). When he was in his early teen years his father who was an architect got employment as buildings manager for Oslo's forestry administration and the family moved to Midtstuen in the prestigious Holmenkollen part of the capital. His father has designed many of the popular public cabins in the Oslo forests.

Probably the most astonishing event in Røsjorde's life took place when 19 years old, straight out of Ris Upper Secondary School, was assigned the job as headmaster at Senjahopen in Troms. Besides his administrative chores this position also taught him to appreciate the teaching vocation.

Røsjorde has both a civilian and a military education. In 1970 he graduated cand.real. from the University of Oslo having majored in marine biology. He then worked as a lector from 1970 through 1987. From 1970 to 1972 at Breidablikk School in Sandefjord, Vestfold, and from 1972 to 1987 at Stord Upper Secondary School in Hordaland where he also was school counselor.

Hans J. Røsjorde has a military education (befalskole) and was in the service during the period 1962–1990. In 1982 he attained to the rank of captain. He has been a member of the NATO Parliamentary Assembly (1989–2001) and in conjunction with this has held miscellaneous NATO positions. Between 1974 and 1990 he was local commander of the Norwegian Home Guard for Stord Municipality. Between 2002 and 2006 he served as president of the Norwegian Reserve Officers' Association.

== Political career ==
Having previously served in the position of deputy representative from Hordaland during the term 1981–1985 and 1985–1989, Røsjorde first became a parliamentarian in 1987, midway through the second term when he permanently replaced the deceased Bjørn Erling Ytterhorn. He was then elected to the Parliament of Norway in 1989, and he was re-elected on two occasions. Røsjorde was a prominent member of Parliament, serving as President of the Lagting (1989–1993), as chair of the defense committee (1989–2001), and finally becoming Vice President of the Storting (1997–2001).

Before entering the national political scene Røsjorde was a member of the municipal council of Stord Municipalityfrom 1979 to 1989.

In 2001 he became the County Governor of Oslo and Akershus, succeeding Kåre Willoch. He was the first County Governor for the Progress Party. He retired in 2011. He joined the Norwegian Parliamentary Intelligence Oversight Committee in 2011.

His role as a prominent politician from the Norwegian Progress Party has, unlike for most of his party comrades, not been stained by involvement in intrigue and the many conflicts that is associated with that party. In an interview with the newspaper Aftenposten in connection with his 60th birthday and his start as County Governor he himself describes his role as "rather that of a mediator and advisor".

Hans Røsjorde currently lives in Oslo, having moved there from Stord when he took up his post as County Governor. As a hobby, he takes care of his antique Willy's Jeep.
