= Christian Gierløff =

Norwegian economist (1879–1962)

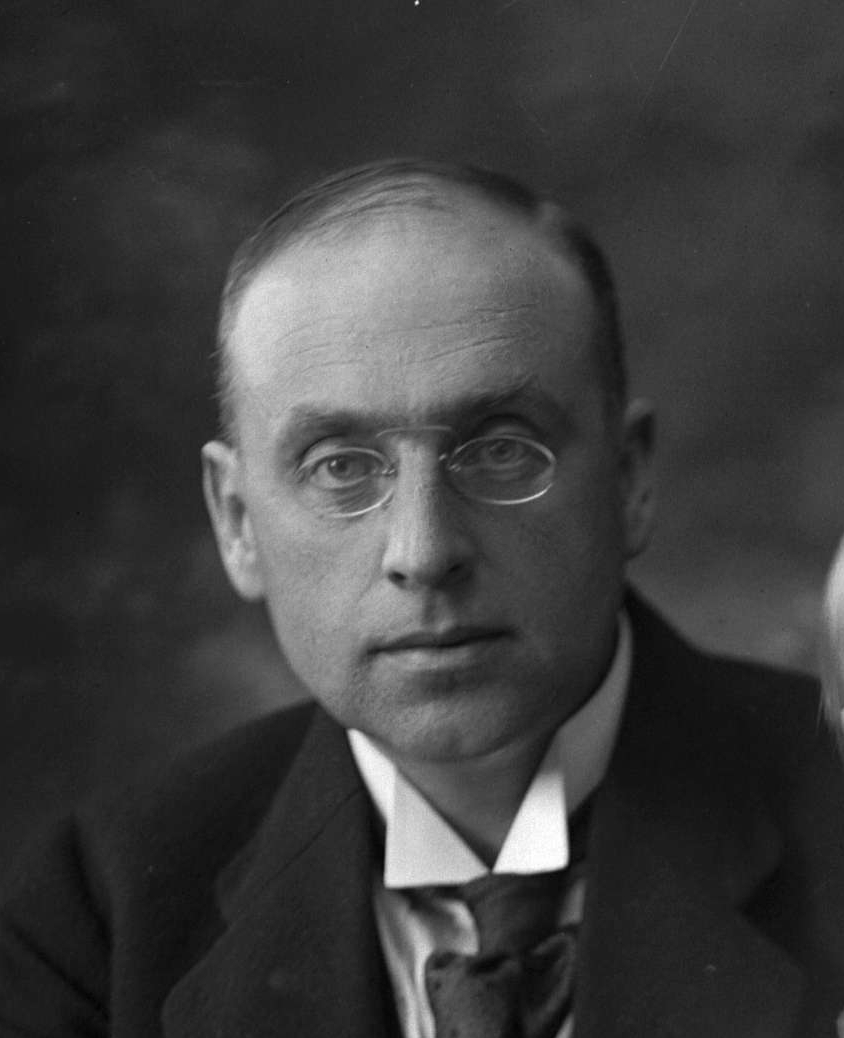
- Born: 6 June 1879; Kragerø Municipality
- Died: 21 August 1962; Kragerø Municipality
- Occupation: Writer

Christian Peder Grønbech Gierløff (6 June 1879 - 21 August 1962) was a Norwegian economist, town planner and a prolific writer. He also was a close friend of the art painter Edvard Munch and the writer Knut Hamsun.

== Career ==
He was born in Kragerø as a son of timber merchant Gustav Klem Gierløff (1831–1906) and Marie S. C. Hassel (1844–1910). He took secondary education in Hamar, but failed his exams. After a time at sea, he finally took the examen artium in Bergen in 1898. He worked in Oplandenes Avis in Hamar and Arbeidet in Bergen. He later worked in Ørebladet from 1902 to 1905, one year as editor of Posten, then as sub-editor in Dagbladet from 1907 to 1914 and editor-in-chief in Haugesunds Avis from 1914 to 1915. He took the cand.oecon. degree at the Royal Frederick University in 1911, and in December 1912 he married Hjørdis Nielsen (1889–1957). He chaired his local branch of the Liberal Party from 1914 to 1915.

He is known for his activities in the interwar period, when he planned the urban garden ("hageby") movement, co-operating among others with state architect Sverre Pedersen. Gierløff released several books, and was especially interested in housing questions, urbanism and social policies. Important books include Byer og boliger (1916) and Et fremstøt for boligsaken i Norge (1940). In 1915 he became secretary-general of Norsk Forening for Boligreformer, where he remained until 1936. He edited their magazine Boligsak i By og Bygd from 1916 to 1924 and its successor Bolig og Bygg from 1924 to 1934. From 1929 Gierløff also worked as secretary at the Norwegian Institute of Technology, and held lectures on town planning. He was removed from office by the Nazi authorities in 1942. He had been involved in the Norwegian Campaign in 1940. He was decorated with the Defence Medal 1940 – 1945. He had appointed a Knight 1st Class of the Royal Norwegian Order of St. Olav in 1929.

Throughout his life he wrote books and reports on economic history, mainly on companies and banks, in addition to several books on economic and political history. He biographed Hans E. Kinck, Thomas Bennett, Bjørnstjerne Bjørnson, Tryggve Andersen, Peter Wessel Tordenskiold in addition to personal friends Edvard Munch and Knut Hamsun. He died in August 1962 in Kragerø.
