= Credokirken =

- Credokirken
- 60°20′20″N 5°19′18″E
- Location: Bergen
- Country: Norway
- Denomination: Evangelicalism, Neo-charismatic movement
- Website: credokirken.no

History
- Founded: 1992
- Founder: Enevald Flåten

Credokirken (formerly Levende Ord Bibelsenter Norwegian for "Living Word Bible Centre") is a charismatic megachurch in Bergen, Norway. The church also has its own Bible school (together with Pinsekirken Tabernaklet and SALT Bergenskirken), and an elementary school. The senior pastor is Olav Rønhovde.

== History ==
Levende Ord had an active media profile. Here the TV-program "Tett på" is being broadcast live on local television.

The congregation was founded in 1992 by Enevald Flåten. The Church has connection with the Swedish church Livets Ord.

Flåten left the church in 2006 after an internal conflict. Olav Rønhovde then became senior pastor. In 2009, Levende ord changed its name to Credokirken (The Credo Church). Credo is Latin for "I believe".

In 2019, the church has 1,013 official members, and a weekly attendance of 2,000 people.
