= Bjørn Erling Ytterhorn =

Norwegian politician

Bjørn Erling Ytterhorn (17 August 1923 – 12 September 1987) was a Norwegian politician for the Progress Party.

He was born in Fana.

He was elected to the Norwegian Parliament from Hordaland in 1981, and was re-elected on one occasion. Midway through his second term, he died in 1987 and was replaced by Hans J. Røsjorde.

Ytterhorn was a member of the executive committee of Bergen city council in 1979–1983, and of Hordaland county council in 1975–1979 and 1979–1983.

His wife Inger-Marie Ytterhorn is also a former member of the Norwegian Parliament.
