= Progress Party (Norway) =

Right-wing political party in Norway

Progress Party Fremskrittspartiet Framstegspartiet
- Abbreviation: FrP
- Leader: Sylvi Listhaug
- Deputy leaders: Terje Søviknes; Hans Andreas Limi
- Parliamentary leader: Sylvi Listhaug
- Founder: Anders Lange
- Founded: 8 April 1973
- Headquarters: Karl Johans gate 25 0159, Oslo
- Newspaper: Fremskritt (1974–2014)
- Youth wing: Progress Party's Youth
- Membership (2023): 16,075
- Ideology: National conservatism; Right-libertarianism; Right-wing populism
- Political position: Right-wing to far-right
- European affiliation: European Conservatives, Patriots & Affiliates
- Nordic affiliation: Nordic Blue
- Colours: Blue
- Storting: 47 / 169
- County councils: 83 / 728
- County Mayors: 0 / 15
- Municipal councils: 948 / 10,781
- Municipal Mayors: 14 / 357
- Sami Parliament: 0 / 39

Website
- frp.no
- Politics of Norway; Political parties; Elections; A: The FrP self-identifies as "conservative-liberal". The Anglosphere translates it as "right-wing libertarian".

The Progress Party (Bokmål: Fremskrittspartiet; Nynorsk: Framstegspartiet, FrP; Northern Sami: Ovddádusbellodat) is a political party in Norway. It is generally positioned to the right of the Conservative Party, and is considered the most right-wing party to be represented in parliament. It is often described as hard right or right-wing populist, (Note: Sources describing the Progress Party as right-wing populist:) which has been disputed in public discourse, and has been described by various academics and some journalists as far-right. (Note: Sources describing the Progress Party as "far-right":) By 2020, the party attained a growing national conservative faction. Since the 2025 parliamentary election, it has been Norway's second largest political party, winning 47 seats in the Storting. It was a partner in the government coalition led by the Conservative Party from 2013 to 2020.

The Progress Party focuses on law and order as well downsizing the bureaucracy and the public sector; it identifies as an economic liberal party which competes with the left to represent the workers of Norway. The Progress Party calls for a strict immigration policy, integration of immigrants and for the removal of illegal immigrants or foreigners who commit crimes. During its time in coalition government from 2013, the party oversaw the creation of a Minister for Integration and increased the process of deporting failed asylum seekers or migrants with criminal convictions. It has been described as anti-immigration; nevertheless, the FrP also supports free migration to and from the European Union through the European Economic Area as well as helping refugees through the United Nations Convention Relating to the Status of Refugees.

The Progress Party was founded by Anders Lange in 1973 as an anti-tax protest movement. Its development was greatly influenced by Carl I. Hagen, the party's long-standing leader between 1978 and 2006. Siv Jensen served as the party leader between 2006 and 2021. She was succeeded by her deputy leader, Sylvi Listhaug on 8 May 2021.

== History ==
=== Anders Lange's Party ===
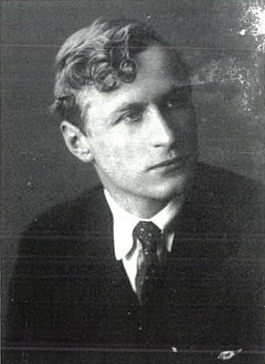
Anders Lange, founder of the party

The Progress Party was founded at a meeting at the movie theater Saga Kino in Oslo on 8 April 1973, attended by around 1,345 people. An address speech was held by Anders Lange, after whom the party was named the Anders Lange's Party for a Strong Reduction in Taxes, Duties and Public Intervention, commonly known as Anders Lange's Party (ALP). Lange had some political experience from the interwar era Fatherland League and was part of the Norwegian resistance movement during the Second World War. Since the end of the war, he had worked as an independent right-wing political editor and public speaker. Lange held his first public speech as chairman of ALP at Youngstorget in Oslo on 16 May the same year. ALP was to a large extent inspired by the Danish Progress Party, which was founded by Mogens Glistrup. Glistrup also spoke at the event, which gathered around 4,000 attendees.

Originally, Anders Lange wanted the party to be an anti-tax protest movement rather than a common political party. The party had a brief political platform on a single sheet of paper that on one side listed ten things the party was "tired of", and on the other side ten things that they were in favour of. The protest was directed against what Lange claimed to be an unacceptable high level of taxes and subsidies. In the 1973 parliamentary election, the party won 5% of the vote and gained four seats in the Norwegian parliament. The main reasons for the success has later been seen by scholars as a mixture of tax protests, the charisma of Anders Lange, the role of television, the aftermath of the 1972 European Community membership referendum and the political development in Denmark. The first party conference was held in Hjelmeland Municipality in 1974, where the party established its first political conventions.

=== Progress Party and Carl I. Hagen ===
In early 1974, Kristofer Almås, Deputy Member of Parliament Carl I. Hagen, along with some others, broke away and formed the short-lived Reform Party. The background for this was a criticism of ALPs "undemocratic organisation" and lack of a real party program. However, in the same year, Anders Lange died; consequently Hagen stepped in as a regular Member of Parliament in Lange's place. As a result, the Reform Party merged back into ALP already the following year. The party adopted its current name, the Progress Party, on 29 January 1977, inspired by the great success of the Danish Progress Party. The Progress Party performed poorly in the 1977 parliamentary election, and was left without parliamentary representation. In the 1978 party convention, Carl I. Hagen was elected as party chairman. Hagen soon started to expand the political program of the party, and built a conventional party organisation, a step which Lange and some of his followers had opposed. The party's youth organisation, the Progress Party's Youth, was also established in 1978. Hagen succeeded in sharpening the image of the party as an anti-tax movement. His criticism of the wisdom of hoarding billions of dollars in the "Oil Fund" hit a nerve owing to perceived declines in infrastructure, schools, and social services and long queues at hospitals.

=== 1980s: establishing the party ===
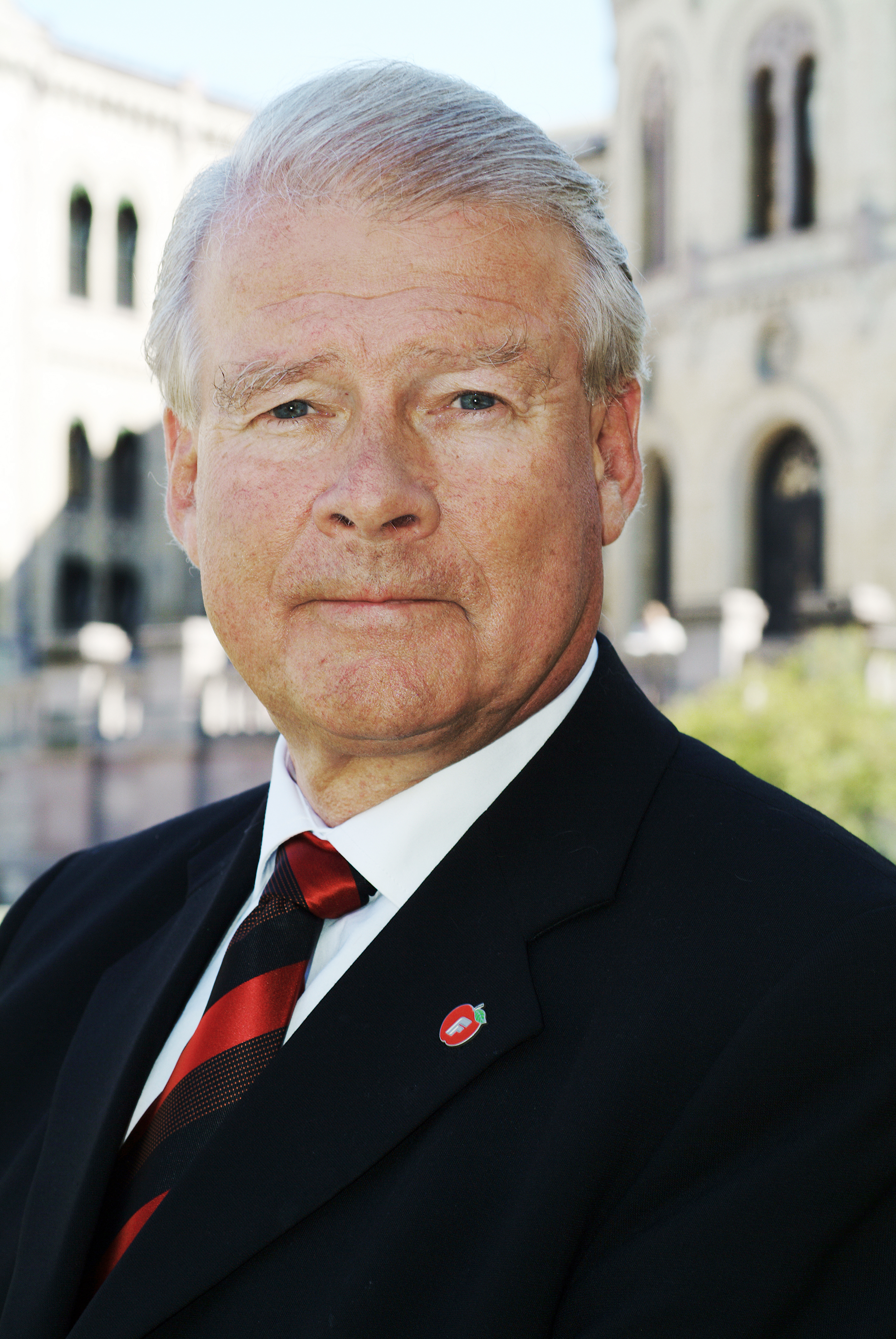
Carl I. Hagen, party leader for nearly three decades from 1978 to 2006

While the Progress Party dropped out of parliament altogether in 1977, it returned in the following 1981 parliamentary election with four representatives. In this election, the political right in general had a great upturn, which garnered the Progress Party increased support. The ideology of the party was sharpened in the 1980s, and the party officially declared that it was a libertarian party at its national convention in Sandefjord in 1983. Until then, the party had not had a clearly defined ideology. In the campaign for the 1985 parliamentary election, the party attacked many aspects of the Norwegian welfare state, and campaigned for privatization of medical care, education and government-owned enterprises as well as steep cuts in income tax. In the election, the party lost two of its four members of parliament, but was left with some power as they became the kingmaker. In May 1986, the party used this position to effectively throw out the governing Conservative-led government after it had proposed to increase gas taxes. A minority Labour government was established as a result.

The first real breakthrough for the party in Norwegian politics came in the 1987 local elections, when the party nearly doubled its support from 6.3% to 12.3% (county results). This was largely as immigration was for the first time seriously taken up as an issue by the party (although Hagen had already in the late 1970s called for a strongly restrictive immigration policy), successfully putting the issue on the national agenda. Its campaign had mainly been focused on the issue of asylum seekers, but was additionally helped by the infamous "Mustafa-letter", a letter read out by Hagen during the electoral campaign that portrayed the future Islamisation of Norway. In April 1988 the party was for the first time the second largest party in Norway in an opinion poll with 23.5%. In September 1988, the party further proposed in parliament for a referendum on the immigration policy, which was regarded by political scientists as the start of the party's 1989 election campaign. In 1989, the party made its breakthrough in national politics. In the 1989 parliamentary election, the party obtained 13%, up from 3.7% in 1985, and became the third largest party in Norway. It started to gain power in some local administrations. The first mayors from the party were Håkon Rege in Sola Municipality (1988–1989), Bjørn Bråthen in Råde (1990–1991) and Peter N. Myhre in Oslo (1990–1991).

=== 1990s: libertarian-wing schism and consolidation ===
The 1993 parliamentary election halved the party's support to 6.3% and ten members of parliament. This drop in support can be seen as the result of an internal conflict within the party that came to a head in 1992, between the more radical libertarian minority and the majority led by Carl I. Hagen. The right-libertarians, or simply libertarians, had removed the party's focus on immigration, declaring it a "non-issue" in the early 1990s, which was heavily punished by voters in 1993 as well as 1991. Social conservative policy platforms had also been liberalised and caused controversy such as accepting homosexual partnership. The party's unclear stance on Norwegian membership of the European Union also contributed greatly to the setback, by moving the focus away from the party's stronger issues such as during the 1994 Norwegian European Union membership referendum.

While many of the libertarians, including Pål Atle Skjervengen and Tor Mikkel Wara, had left the party before the 1993 election or had been rejected by voters, the conflict finally culminated in 1994. Following the party conference at Bolkesjø Hotell in Telemark in April of that year, four MPs of the "libertarian wing" in the party broke off as independents. This was because Hagen had given them an ultimatum to adhere to the political line of the party majority and parliamentary group, or else to leave. This incident was later nicknamed "Dolkesjø", a pun on the name of the hotel, with "dolke" meaning to "lit. stab (in the back) /betray".

These events have been seen by political scientists as a turning point for the party. Subsequently, the libertarians founded a libertarian organisation called the Free Democrats, which attempted to establish a political party but without success. Parts of the younger management of the party and the more libertarian youth organisation of the party also broke away and even tried to disestablish the entire youth organisation. The youth organisation was however soon running again, this time with more "loyal" members, although it remained more libertarian than its mother organisation. After this, the Progress Party had a more right-wing populist profile, which resulted in its gaining electoral support.

In the 1995 local elections, the Progress Party regained the level of support seen at the 1987 elections. This was said largely to have been as a result of a focus on Progress Party core issues in the electoral campaign, especially immigration, as well as the party dominating the media picture as a result of the controversy around the 1995 Norwegian Association meeting at Godlia kino. The latter particularly gained the party many sympathy votes, as a result of the harsh media storm targeted against Hagen. In the 1997 parliamentary election, the party obtained 15.3% of the vote, and for the first time became the second largest political party in Norway. The 1999 local elections resulted in the party's first mayor as a direct result of an election, Terje Søviknes in Os Municipality. Twenty municipalities also elected a deputy mayor from the Progress Party.

=== 2000–2001: turmoil and expulsion of populists ===
While the Progress Party had witnessed close to 35% support in opinion polls in late 2000, its support fell back to 1997 levels in the upcoming election in 2001. This was largely a result of turmoil surrounding the party. The party's deputy leader Terje Søviknes became involved in a sex scandal, and internal political conflicts came to the surface; Hagen had already in 1999 tried to quiet the most controversial immigration opponents in the parliamentary party, who had gained influence since the 1994 national convention. In late 2000 and early 2001, opposition to this locally in Oslo, Hordaland and Vest-Agder sometimes resulted in expulsions of local representatives. Eventually Hagen also, in various ways, got rid of the so-called "gang of seven" (syverbanden), which consisted of seven members of parliament. In January 2001, Hagen claimed that he had seen a pattern where these had cooperated on several issues, and postulated that they were behind a conspiracy to eventually get Øystein Hedstrøm elected as party chairman. The seven were eventually suspended, excluded from or voluntarily left the party, starting in early 2001. They most notably included Vidar Kleppe (the alleged "leader"), Dag Danielsen, Fridtjof Frank Gundersen, as well as Jan Simonsen. Only Hedstrøm remained in the party, but was subsequently kept away from publicly discussing immigration issues.

This again caused turmoil within the party; supporters of the excluded members criticized their treatment, some resigned from the party, and some of the party's local chapters were closed. Some of the outcasts ran for office in the 2001 election in several new county lists, and later some formed a new party called the Democrats, with Kleppe as chairman and Simonsen as deputy chairman. Though the "gang of seven" took controversial positions on immigration, the actions taken against them were also based on internal issues; it remains unclear to what degree the settlement was based primarily on political disagreements or tactical considerations. Hagen's main goal with the "purge" was an attempt to make it possible for non-socialist parties to cooperate in an eventual government together with the Progress Party. In 2007, he revealed that he had received "clear signals" from politicians in among other the Christian Democratic Party, that government negotiations were out of the question so long as certain specific Progress Party politicians, including Kleppe and Simonsen (but not Hedstrøm), remained in the party. The more moderate libertarian minority in Oslo, including Henning Holstad, Svenn Kristiansen and Siv Jensen, now improved their hold in the party.

=== 2001–2005: Bondevik II years ===
In the 2001 parliamentary election, the party lost the gains it had made according to opinion polling but maintained its position from the 1997 election, it got 14.6% and 26 members in the parliament. The election result allowed them to unseat the Labour Party government of Jens Stoltenberg and replace it with a three-party coalition led by Christian Democrat Kjell Magne Bondevik. However, the coalition continued to decline to govern together with the Progress Party as they considered the political differences too large. The Progress Party eventually decided to tolerate the coalition, as it promised to invest more in defence, open more private hospitals and open for more competition in the public sector. In 2002 the Progress Party again advanced in the opinion polls and for a while became the largest party.

The local elections of 2003 were a success for the party. In 36 municipalities, the party gained more votes than any other; it succeeded in electing the mayor in only 13 of these, but also secured 40 deputy mayor positions. The Progress Party had participated in local elections since 1975, but until 2003 had only secured a mayoral position four times, all on separate occasions. The Progress Party vote in Os—the only municipality that elected a Progress Party mayor in 1999—increased from 36.6% in 1999 to 45.7% in 2003. The party also became the single largest in the counties of Vestfold and Rogaland.

In the 2005 parliamentary elections, the party again became the second largest party in the Norwegian parliament, with 22.1% of the votes and 38 seats, a major increase from 2001. Although the centre-right government of Bondevik which the Progress Party had tolerated since 2001 was beaten by the leftist Red-Green Coalition, Hagen had before the election said that his party would no longer accept Bondevik as Prime Minister, following his consistent refusal to formally include the Progress Party in government. For the first time, the party was also successful in getting members of parliament elected from all counties of Norway, and even became the largest party in three: Vest-Agder, Rogaland and Møre og Romsdal. After the parliamentary elections in 2005, the party also became the largest party in many opinion polls. The Progress Party led November 2006 opinion polls with a support of 32.9% of respondents, and it continued to poll above 25 percent during the following years.

=== 2006–2021: Siv Jensen ===
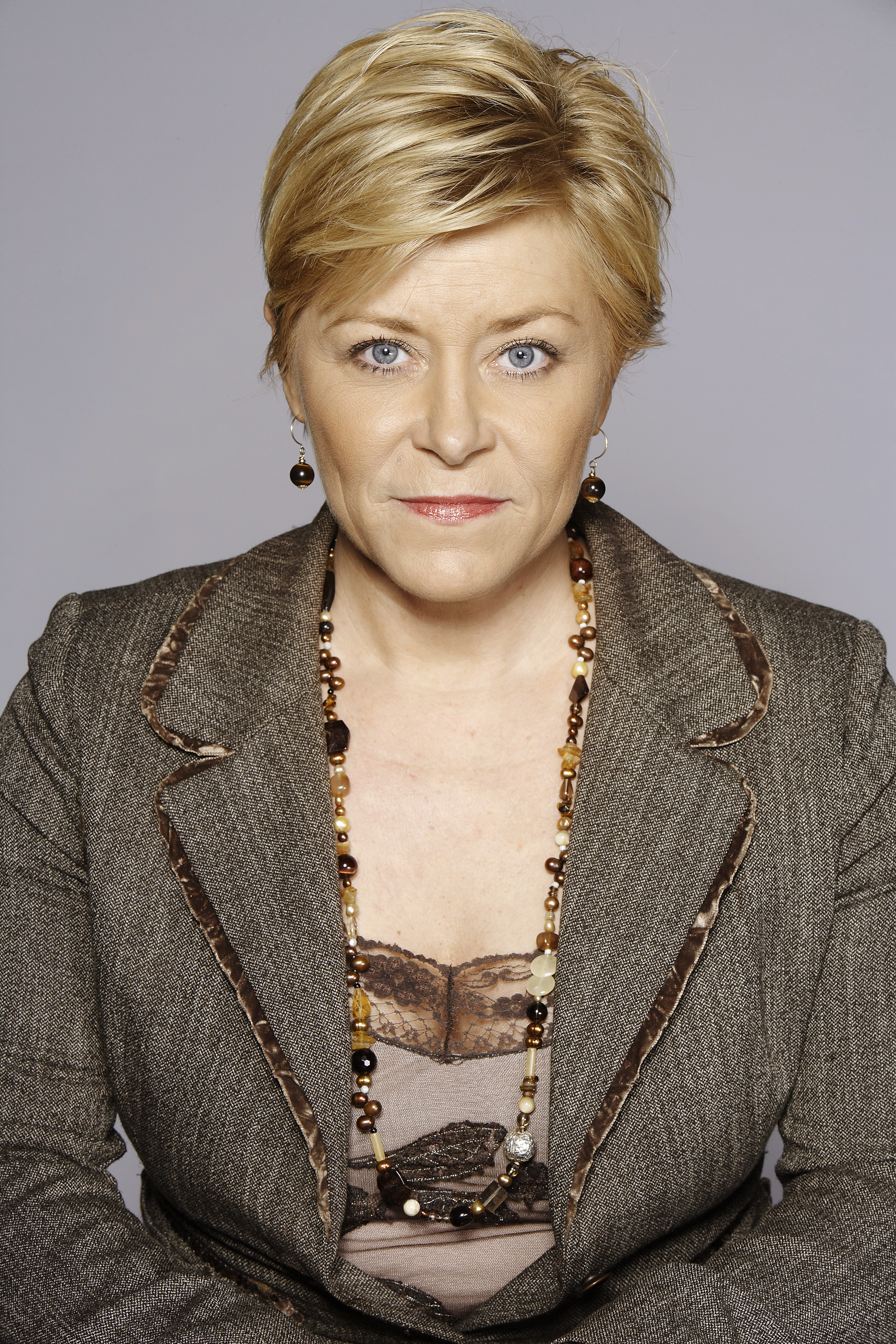
Siv Jensen, leader of the Progress Party from 2006 to 2021

In 2006, after 27 years as leader of the party, Hagen stepped down to become Vice President of the Norwegian parliament Stortinget. Siv Jensen was chosen as his successor, with the hope that she could increase the party's appeal to voters, build bridges to centre-right parties, and head or participate in a future government of Norway. Following the local elections of 2007, Progress Party candidates became mayor in 17 municipalities, seven of these continuing on from 2003. Deputy mayors for the party however decreased to 33. The party in general strongly increased its support in municipalities where the mayor had been elected from the Progress Party in 2003.

In the months before the 2009 parliamentary elections, the party had, as in the 2001 election, rated very highly in opinion poll results which however declined towards the actual election. Earlier in the year, the Progress Party had achieved above 30% in some polls which made it the largest party by several percentage points. With such high gains, the election result was in this case relatively disappointing. Before the election the gains continued to decrease, with most of these losses going to the Conservative Party which had a surprisingly successful campaign. The decline in support over a longer period of time can also be seen as the Labour Party was since 2008 accused of "stealing" policies from the Progress Party. The Progress Party did, regardless, achieve a slight gain from the 2005 election with 22.9%, the best election result in the party's history. It also for the first time got represented in the Sami Parliament of Norway in 2009, with three representatives. This made it the fourth largest party in the Sami parliament, and second largest of the nationwide parties. In the 2009 informal school elections, it became the largest party in Norway with 24% of the votes.

While other parties before had refused the Progress Party's efforts to join governing coalitions at the national level owing to concerns about the party's alleged populism and positions on immigration issues, after the election the Conservative Party stated they wanted to be "a bridge between the Progress Party and the centre." The position arose as the Progress Party vowed to not support any government coalition that it itself was not a part of, while centrist parties rejected participating in a government coalition together with the party.

Since early 2010, opinion polls regularly showed a majority support for the Progress Party and Conservative Party together. The Progress Party however saw a strong setback for the 2011 local elections. The party lost 6% in vote share, while the Conservative Party gained 9%. According to political scientists, most of the setback could be explained by a low turnout of Progress Party supporters.

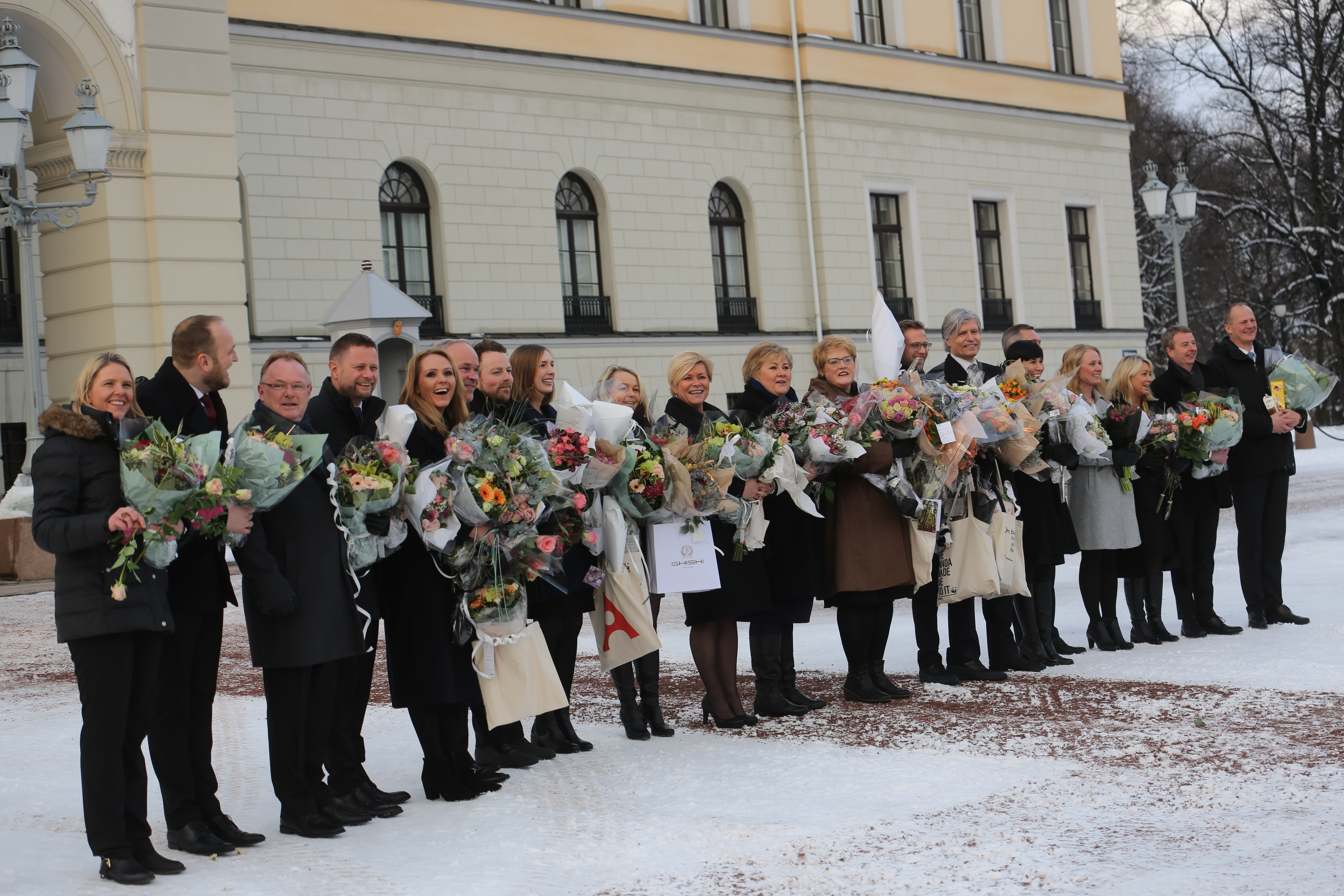
Solberg's Cabinet in 2018

In coalition with the Conservative Party, the party won the 2013 parliamentary election and helped form its first ever government, the Solberg's Cabinet, although the Progress Party itself lost seats and is now the third largest party instead of the second largest. The parties won renewed support for the government in the 2017 parliamentary election, which was expanded to include the centrist Liberal Party and the Christian Democratic Party in 2018.

The Progress Party withdrew from the government coalition in January 2020. The cause of the withdrawal was repatriation to Norway of a Norwegian citizen who volunteered in the Islamic State. The position of the Progress Party was that no such person should receive assistance to return to Norway. The Solberg cabinet undertook the repatriation despite the protests from the Progress Party, over what they considered humanitarian considerations.

=== 2021–present: Sylvi Listhaug ===
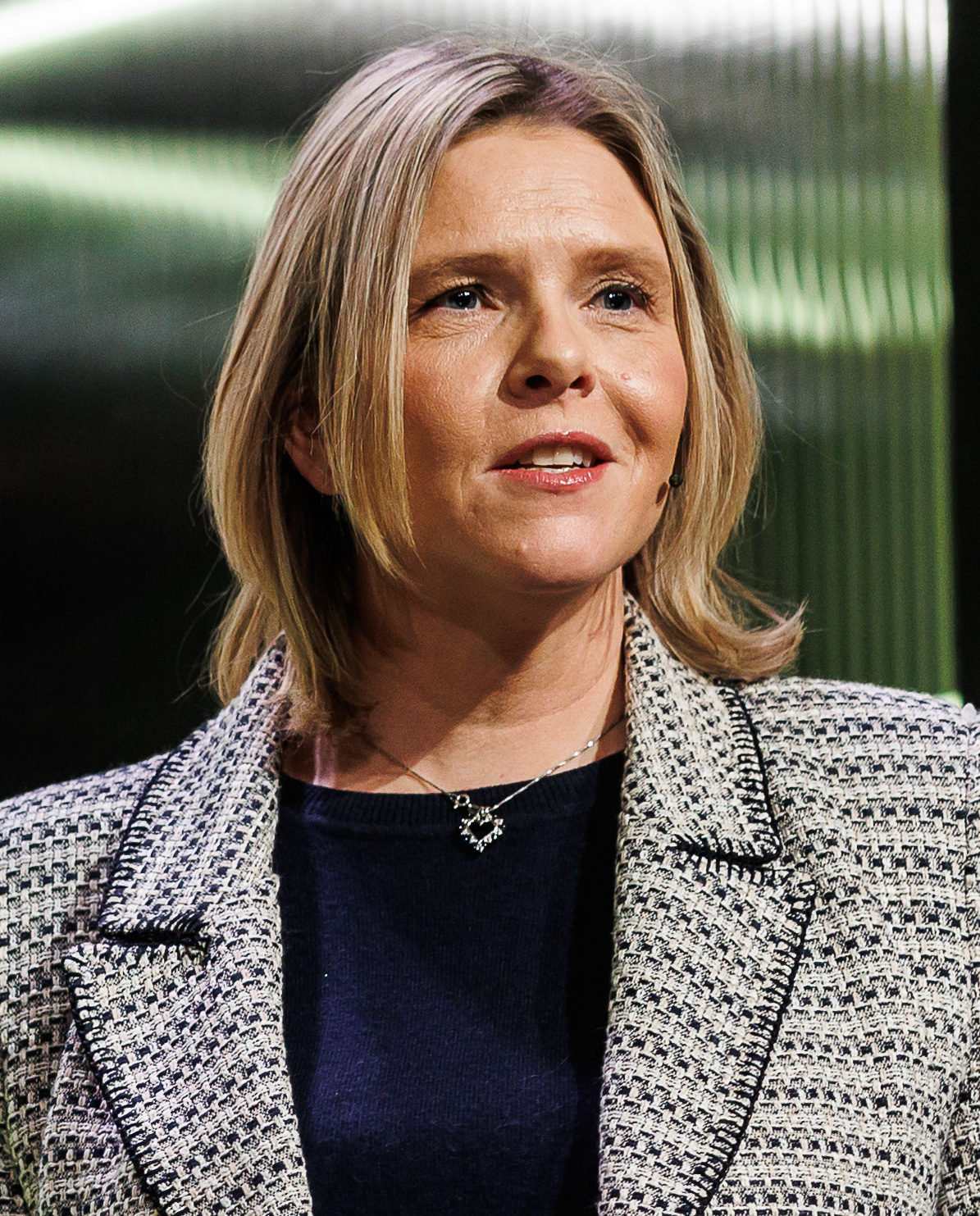
Sylvi Listhaug

In February 2021, Jensen announced that she would stand down as party leader. She was replaced by former deputy leader and immigration minister Sylvi Listhaug in May 2021. Listhaug had previously been endorsed as a potential future leader by both Jensen and former chairman Carl I. Hagen.

Despite leading the polls for a short period in early 2025, the Progress Party eventually failed to win the election, coming in second. The party gained seats in the Storting and ended up with 47 seats, the highest seat count in the party's history, with Sylvi Listhaug also becoming the leader of the largest opposition party.

== Ideology and political positions ==
The party historically identified itself in the preamble of its platform as a liberal (liberalistisk; "liberal", "libertarian") party, built on Norwegian and Western traditions and cultural heritage, with a basis in a Christian understanding of life and humanist values. Its main declared goal in 2010 was a strong reduction in taxes and government intervention.

Many within the party reject the description of the party as liberal. The party has a wing that identifies itself as economically liberal or libertarian, and a wing that identifies itself as national-conservative and focuses strongly on anti-immigration politics. (Note: Sources describing the Progress Party as anti-immigration:) According to scholar Anders Ravik Jupskås, the national conservative faction gained ground in the 2010s; while members of the party leadership tend to identify as liberals or libertarians, the national conservative wing has strong support among the membership. The party's largest chapter, the Oslo chapter, adopted a resolution that calls for the party to declare itself as national conservative and to replace liberalism with a "Norway first" policy aiming at making Norway a "patriotic beacon" in Europe, with a focus on anti-immigration politics and rejection of the scientific consensus on climate change, that includes "a complete ban on non-western immigration" and a referendum on immigration; the Oslo chapter's MP Christian Tybring-Gjedde said that "very few people agree" with the stated ideology of liberalism in the party programme because "liberalism in its extreme form means open borders" and because "liberalism is a dead ideology." Christian Tybring-Gjedde was later expelled from the Progress Party in 2024. Former party leader Carl I. Hagen has supported this initiative, stating that liberal values do not belong in the Progress Party and arguing that the party should become national conservative instead of "liberal extremist". The Progress Party has often been described by academics as right-wing populist, to the disagreement of the party and some observers, including former Prime Minister Erna Solberg and professor Cas Mudde. Various academics have also described the Progress Party as far-right.

The core issues for the party revolve around immigration, crime, foreign aid, the elderly and social security in regards to health and care for the elderly. The party is regarded as having policies on the right in most of these cases, both fiscally and socially, though in some cases, like care for the elderly, the policy is regarded as being on the left. It has been claimed that the party changed in its first three decades, in turn from an "outsider movement" in the 1970s, to American-style libertarianism in the 1980s, to right-wing populism in the 1990s. From the 2000s, the party has to some extent sought to moderate its profile in order to seek government cooperation with centre-right parties. This has been especially true since the expulsion of certain members around 2001, and further under the lead of Siv Jensen from 2006, when the party has tried to move and position itself more towards conservatism and also seek cooperation with such parties abroad. The party values are officially focused on civil liberties, individualism and limited government. A local group within the party, centered around Oslo, expressed a desire for a more nationalistic policy, inspired by the Centre Party. They emphasize patriotism and openly prioritize the interests of Norway and the Norwegian people in a "Norway first" policy. They also promote a complete halt to non-western immigration, and express support for climate change denial. The party has often criticised and called for a reduction of Norwegian foreign aid. The program of the party considers humanitarian action abroad to be preferable, when possible, to receiving refugees from affected areas.

=== Health care ===
The party has for decades been a proponent for shortening wait times for hospital treatment in Norway. 270,000 Norwegians were waiting for medical treatment in 2012–13. In the OECD publication Health at a Glance 2011, Norway had among the longest wait times for elective surgery and specialist appointments among eleven countries surveyed. Since 2013, the Solberg Cabinet has been successful in reducing the average wait times for hospital care.

=== Economy ===
The party aims to reduce the power of the state and the public sector. It believes that the public sector should only be there to secure a minimum standard of living, and that individuals, businesses and organisations should take care of various tasks instead of the public sector, in most cases. The party also generally advocates the lowering of taxes, various duties as well increased market economy. The party also notably want to invest more of Norway's oil wealth in infrastructure (particularly roads, broadband capacity, hospitals, schools and nursing homes) and the welfare state. This position, that has used a sense of a welfare crisis to support demands to spend more of the oil fund now rather than later, is part of its electoral success.

The party wants to strongly reduce taxation in Norway, and says that the money Norwegians earn, is theirs to be kept. They want to remove inheritance tax and property tax. The party advocates increased spending of Norway's Oil Fund on investments in infrastructure and aims to eliminate the existing budgetary rules which set a limit on such spending.

=== Society ===
The party regards the family to be a natural, necessary and fundamental element in a free society. It regards the family to be a carrier of traditions and culture, and to have a role in raising and caring for children. The party also wants all children to have a right of visitation and care from both parents, and to secure everyone's right to know who their biological parents are. The party opposed the legalization of same-sex marriage in 2008, questioning how children would "cope" with the law. In schools, the party wants to improve the working environment for teachers and students by focusing more on order, discipline and class management. The party wants more individual adaptation, to implement grades in basic subjects from fifth grade, open more private schools and decrease the amount of theory in vocational educations.

During the national convention in May 2013, the party voted in favor of both same-sex marriage and same-sex adoption. The party has for several years been a proponent for legalizing blood donation for homosexuals.

The party believes that artists should be less dependent on public support, and instead be more dependent on making a living on what they create. The party believes that regular people should rather decide what good culture is, and demands that artists on public support should offer something the audience wants. It also wants to abolish the annual licence fee for the Norwegian Broadcasting Corporation and privatise the company. Otherwise, the party wants to protect and secure Norwegian cultural heritage.

Since the party distances itself from discrimination and special treatment based on gender, religion and ethnic origin, the party wants to dissolve the Sami Parliament of Norway, which is based on ethnic classifications. The party wants to uphold Sami culture, but wants to work against any special treatment based on ethnic origin regarding the right of use of water and land.

The party is also a proponent of a ban on wearing the burka and niqab in public spaces, schools and universities, first proposing the idea in 2010. This policy for schools and universities was ultimately achieved in 2018.

=== Law and order ===
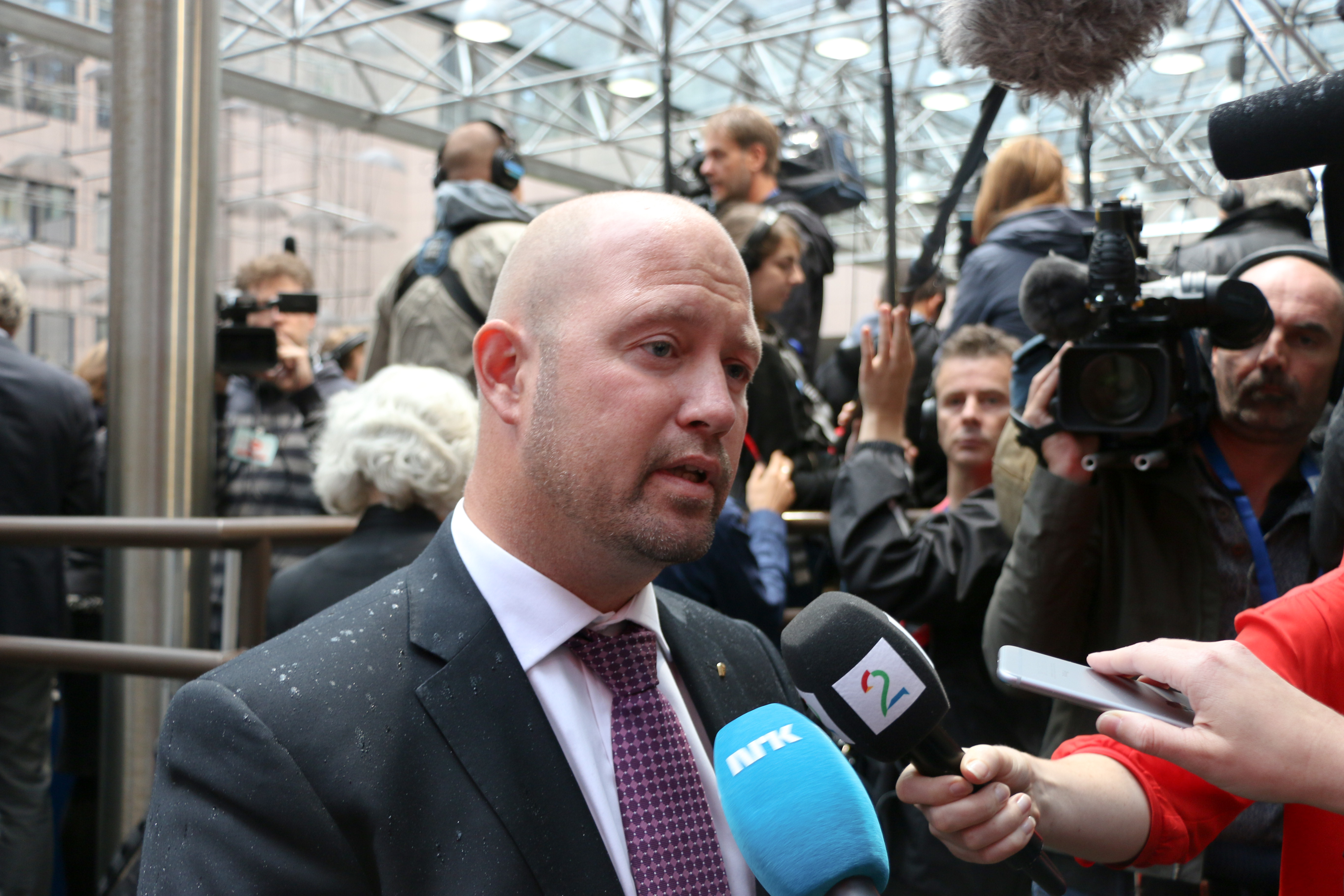
Anders Anundsen served as Minister of Justice (2013–2016).

The party supports an increase in police forces, and more visible police on the streets. It wants to implement tougher punishments, especially for crime regarding violence and morality offences. The party also wants to establish an ombudsman for victims and relatives, as it believes today's supportive concern focus too much on the criminals rather than the victims. It wants the police to be able to use more non-lethal weapons, such as electroshock weapons. It also does not accept any use of religious or political symbols with the police uniform, and wants to expel foreign citizens who are convicted of crime with a frame of more than three months imprisonment.

=== Immigration ===
From the second half of the 1980s, the economic and welfare aspects of immigration policy were mainly a focus of Progress Party criticism, including the strains placed by immigration on the welfare state. During the 1990s the party shifted to focus more on cultural issues and conflicts, a development which can also be seen in the general public debate, including among its political opponents. In 1993, it was the first party in Norway to use the notion of "integration politics" in its party programme. While the party has made numerous proposals on immigration in parliament, it has rarely received majority support for them. Its proposals have largely been rejected by the remaining political parties, as well as the mass media. Although the party's immigration policies have been compared to those of the Danish People's Party and the Sweden Democrats, leading party members have instead chosen to compare its immigration policies with those of the Dutch People's Party for Freedom and Democracy and the Danish Venstre previously.

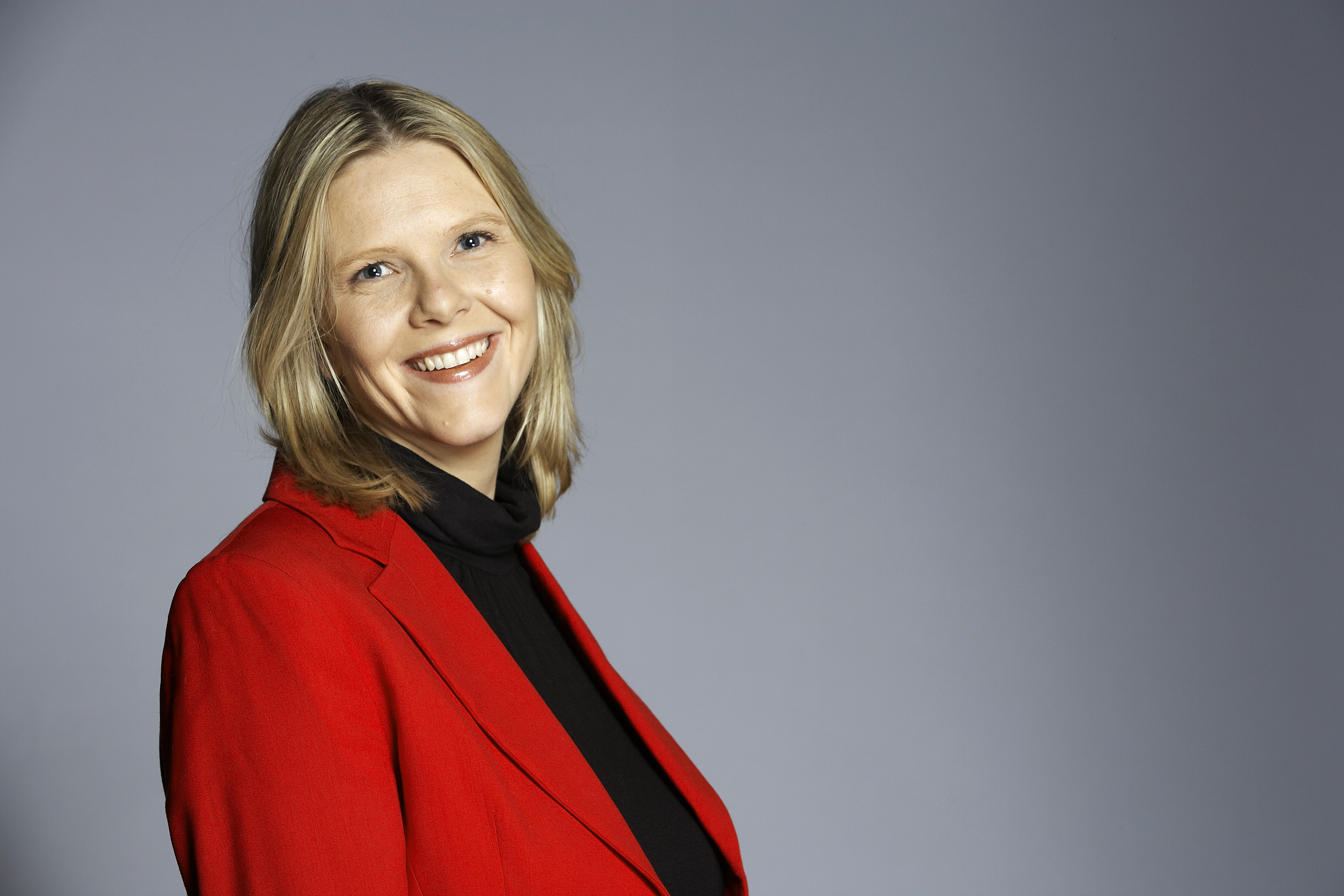
Sylvi Listhaug served as Norway's first Minister of Immigration and Integration (2015–2018).

Generally, the party wants a stricter immigration policy, so that only those who are in need of protection according to the UN Refugee Convention are allowed to stay in Norway. Progress Party MPs have also stated that high levels of immigration combined with poor integration leads to both Norwegian and broadly Western values such as tolerance, freedom of speech and democracy being undermined and that politicians on the political left have enabled social issues through relaxing immigration policies. In a speech in the 2007 election campaign, Siv Jensen claimed that the immigration policy was a failure because it let criminals stay in Norway, while throwing out people who worked hard and followed the law. The party claims the immigration and integration policy to be naive. In 2008, the party wanted to "avoid illiterates and other poorly resourced groups who we see are not able to adapt in Norway"; which included countries as Somalia, Afghanistan and Pakistan. The party opposes that asylum seekers are allowed stay in Norway on humanitarian grounds or due to health issues, and seeks to substantially limit the number of family reunifications. The party has also called for a referendum on the general immigration policy. In government, the party supported creating a Minister for Integration in the cabinet and a zero tolerance policy on illegal immigration combined with deportation of illegal immigrants and non-citizens who had committed serious felonies. Some commentators noted that Norway deported a record number of failed asylum seekers and illegal residents during the period when the party provided support to the Conservatives from 2013 to 2021.

The Progress Party is also opposed to repatriating Norwegian citizens who leave the country to join terrorist organisations such as Islamic State and withdrew their support to the Solberg cabinet in January 2020 over the government's decision to repatriate a Norwegian national on humanitarian grounds who had escaped to join ISIS.

A poll conducted by the newspaper Utrop in August 2009 showed that 10% (14% of the respondents answering "Don't know" were removed) of immigrants in Norway would vote for the Progress Party, only beaten by the Labour Party (38% and 56% respectively), when asked. More specifically, this constituted 9% of both African and Eastern European immigrants, 22% of Western European immigrants and 3% of Asian immigrants. Politicians with immigrant backgrounds are increasingly active in the party, most notably Iranian-Norwegian Mazyar Keshvari and former leader of the youth party, Indian-Norwegian Himanshu Gulati.

=== Foreign policy ===
The Progress Party was for many years open to a referendum on Norwegian membership of the European Union, although only if a majority of the public opinion was seen to favour it beforehand. The party eventually grew to consider membership of Norway in the European Union to be a "non-issue", believing there to be no reason for a debate of a new referendum.

The party regards NATO to be a positive basic element of Norway's defense, security and foreign policy. It also wants to strengthen transatlantic relations in general, and Norway's relationship with the United States more specifically. The party considers its international policy to "follow in the footsteps of Ronald Reagan and Margaret Thatcher." The party has also expressed support for Ukraine since the 2022 full-scale Russian invasion, which it reaffirmed on 1 March 2025, whilst calling for Norway to increase defence spending to 3% of GDP.

Of all the major political parties in Norway, the Progress Party has shown the strongest support for Israel. In 2009, it supported the right of Israel to defend itself against rocket attacks from Hamas, and was the only party in Norway which supported Israel through the 2008–2009 Gaza War. The party has for many years also wanted to relocate the Norwegian embassy in Israel from Tel Aviv to Jerusalem.

The party sees the most viable form of foreign aid policy to be for developing countries to gradually manage themselves without Western aid. It believes that free trade is the key for developing countries to gain economic growth, and that "the relationship between aid and development is at best unclear." The party is strongly critical of "forced contribution to government development aid through taxation", which it wants to limit, also as it believe this weakens the individual's personal sense of responsibility and generosity (voluntary aid). The party instead supports an increase in support for global health and vaccination initiatives against global epidemics such as HIV, AIDS and tuberculosis, and to increase the support after emergencies and disasters.

== International relations ==
The Progress Party does not belong to any international political groups, and does not have any official sister parties. Historically the party has not compared itself to other European parties, and has sought to instead establish its own identity. An international secretary for the party in the same year said that the party had been connected with a "misunderstood right-wing radical label", partly because people with nationalistic and "hopeless attitudes" had previously been involved in the party. Such persons were said to no longer be involved.

The Progress Party was originally inspired by its Danish counterpart, the Progress Party, which ultimately lost parliamentary representation and fell into the fringes of Danish politics. In recent years, the Norwegian party has instead considered Denmark's Venstre to be its sister party. Although Venstre formally is aligned with the Norwegian Liberal Party, some politicians of the party have voiced support for the Progress Party. The party has been compared by some journalists to the Danish People's Party while others such as political scientist Cas Mudde have regarded the Progress Party to be somewhere in between these two parties. Some prominent individual Progress Party politicians. including former Justice Minister Per-Willy Amundsen and former MP Christian Tybring-Gjedde support an official partnership with Sweden Democrats (SD), although historically the party at large has not supported such collaboration. In 2022, party leader Sylvi Listhaug stated that she welcomed the SD's growth in votes and supported the party during the 2022 Swedish general election, but has stated that while her party has common ground with the Sweden Democrats on immigration and law & order, differences in economic policy prevent the Progress Party from considering the SD as a sister party and that the Progress Party as a whole was not looking to build any international alliances.

While the party has been compared by some commentators to European populist parties ranging from the French National Front and the Dutch Pim Fortuyn List, the Progress Party has often distanced itself from parties on the extreme right and has turned down offers of alliances from other European far-right parties. In 2009 the British Conservative Party invited party leader Siv Jensen to hold a lecture in the House of Commons, which was seen as a further recognition of the party internationally.

In the United States, the Progress Party generally supports the Republican Party, and was in 2010 called "friends" by the Republican Party chairman as he said he looked forward to the "continued growth of the party and free market conservative principles." The party has also been described as Reaganite. Party leader Siv Jensen attended the 2008 Republican National Convention in Saint Paul, Minnesota. In 2018, former FrP parliamentary member Christian Tybring-Gjedde and former Minister of Justice Per-Willy Amundsen nominated President Donald Trump for the 2019 Nobel Peace Prize. Trump was nominated due to his historic summit in North Korea and due to his work for "disarmament, peace, and reconciliation between North and South Korea."

== Party leadership ==
=== Party leaders ===
No.	Portrait	Leader	Took office	Left office	Time in office
1	Anders Lange	Anders Lange (1904–1974)	8 April 1973	18 October 1974	1 year, 193 days
2	Eivind Eckbo	Eivind Eckbo (1927–2017); Acting	18 October 1974	26 May 1975	220 days
3	Arve Lønnum	Arve Lønnum (1911–1988)	26 May 1975	11 February 1978	2 years, 261 days
4	Carl I. Hagen	Carl I. Hagen (born 1944)	11 February 1978	6 May 2006	28 years, 84 days
5	Siv Jensen	Siv Jensen (born 1969)	6 May 2006	8 May 2021	15 years, 2 days
6	Sylvi Listhaug	Sylvi Listhaug (born 1977)	8 May 2021	Incumbent	5 years, 194 days

=== Parliamentary leaders ===
No.	Portrait	Parliamentary leader	Took office	Left office	Time in office
1	Anders Lange	Anders Lange (1904–1974)	8 April 1973	18 October 1974	1 year, 193 days
2	Erik Gjems-Onstad	Erik Gjems-Onstad (1922–2011)	1 November 1974	1 October 1976	1 year, 335 days
3	Harald Slettebø	Harald Slettebø (1922–2018)	1 October 1976	30 September 1977	364 days
4	Carl I. Hagen	Carl I. Hagen (born 1944)	2 October 1981	5 October 2005	24 years, 3 days
5	Siv Jensen	Siv Jensen (born 1969)	5 October 2005	17 October 2013	8 years, 12 days
6	Harald T. Nesvik	Harald T. Nesvik (born 1966)	17 October 2013	2 October 2017	3 years, 350 days
7	Hans Andreas Limi	Hans Andreas Limi (born 1960)	2 October 2017	27 January 2020	2 years, 117 days
(5)	Siv Jensen	Siv Jensen (born 1969)	27 January 2020	12 May 2021	1 year, 105 days
8	Sylvi Listhaug	Sylvi Listhaug (born 1977)	12 May 2021	Incumbent	5 years, 190 days

=== Deputy party leaders ===
First deputy leaders

- Bjørn Erling Ytterhorn (1978–1982)
- Eivind Eckbo (1982–1984)
- Helge N. Albrektsen (1984–1985)
- Anne Beth Moslet (1985–1987)
- Pål Atle Skjervengen (1987–1991)
- Tor Mikkel Wara (1991–1993)
- Ellen Wibe (1993–1994)
- Lodve Solholm (1994–1999)
- Siv Jensen (1999–2006)
- Per Sandberg (2006–2018)
- Sylvi Listhaug (2018–2021)
- Ketil Solvik-Olsen (2021–2023)
- Hans Andreas Limi (2023–present)

Second deputy leaders

- Eivind Eckbo (1978–1980)
- Hugo Munthe-Kaas (1980–1982)
- Tore Haaland (1982–1985)
- Hroar Hansen (1985–1991)
- Jan Simonsen (1991–1993)
- Hans J. Røsjorde (1993–1995)
- Vidar Kleppe (1995–1999)
- Terje Søviknes (1999–2001)
- John Alvheim (2001–2005)
- Per Arne Olsen (2005–2013)
- Ketil Solvik-Olsen (2013–2019)
- Terje Søviknes (2019–present)

== Election results ==
=== Storting ===
Election	Leader	Votes	%	Seats	+/–	Position	Status
1973 (Note: Ran as Anders Lange's Party.)	Anders Lange	107,784	5.0	4 / 155	New	▲6th	Opposition
1977	Arve Lønnum	43,351	1.9	0 / 155	▼4	▼7th	No seats
1981	Carl I. Hagen	109,564	4.5	4 / 155	▲4	▲5th	External support
1985	Carl I. Hagen	96,797	3.7	2 / 157	▼2	▼6th	External support (1985–1986)
1985	Carl I. Hagen	96,797	3.7	2 / 157	▼2	▼6th	Opposition (1986–1989)
1989	Carl I. Hagen	345,185	13.0	22 / 165	▲20	▲3rd	External support (1989–1990)
1989	Carl I. Hagen	345,185	13.0	22 / 165	▲20	▲3rd	Opposition (1990–1993)
1993	Carl I. Hagen	154,497	6.3	10 / 165	▼12	▼6th	Opposition
1997	Carl I. Hagen	395,376	15.3	25 / 165	▲15	▲2nd	External support (1997–2000)
1997	Carl I. Hagen	395,376	15.3	25 / 165	▲15	▲2nd	Opposition (2000–2001)
2001	Carl I. Hagen	369,236	14.6	26 / 165	▲1	▼3rd	External support
2005	Carl I. Hagen	582,284	22.1	38 / 169	▲12	▲2nd	Opposition
2009	Siv Jensen	614,724	22.9	41 / 169	▲3	2nd	Opposition
2013	Siv Jensen	463,560	16.3	29 / 169	▼12	▼3rd	Coalition
2017	Siv Jensen	444,423	15.3	27 / 169	▼2	3rd	Coalition (2017–2020)
2017	Siv Jensen	444,423	15.3	27 / 169	▼2	3rd	External support (2020–2021)
2021	Sylvi Listhaug	346,053	11.7	21 / 169	▼6	▼4th	Opposition
2025	Sylvi Listhaug	767,903	23.9	47 / 169	▲26	▲2nd	Opposition

=== Local elections ===
Election	Vote %	Type
1975	0.8; 1.4	Municipal; County
1979	1.9; 2.5	Municipal; County
1983	5.3; 6.3	Municipal; County
1987	10.4; 12.3	Municipal; County
1991	6.5; 7.0	Municipal; County
1995	10.5; 12.0	Municipal; County
1999	12.1; 13.4	Municipal; County
2003	16.4; 17.9	Municipal; County
2007	17.5; 18.5	Municipal; County
2011	11.4; 11.8	Municipal; County
2015	9.5; 10.2	Municipal; County
2019	8.2; 8.7	Municipal; County
2023	11.4; 12.5	Municipal; County

== See also ==
- List of Progress Party (Norway) MPs
- Fatherland League
- Democrats in Norway
- Politics of Norway

== Bibliography ==
- Allern, Elin Haugsgjerd (2010). Political Parties and Interest Groups in Norway. ECPR Press. ISBN 978-0955820366.
- Arter, David (1999). Scandinavian politics today. Manchester University Press. ISBN 0719051339.
- Gingrich, André; Banks, Marcus (2006). Neo-nationalism in Europe and beyond: perspectives from social anthropology. Berghahn Books. ISBN 1845451902.
- Hagelund, Anniken (2005). Rydgren, Jens (ed.). Movements of exclusion: radical right-wing populism in the Western world. Nova. ISBN 1594540969.
- Jungar, Ann-Cathrine; Jupskås, Anders Ravik (2010). En Populistisk Partifamilie?: En Komparativ-Historisk Analyse Av Nordiske Populistpartier. Högerpopulistiska partier och främlingsfientlig opinion i Europa: Framgång och inflytande (essay). University of Gothenburg. Archived from the original on 7 October 2011.
- Mjelde, Hilmar Langhelle (2008). Explaining Membership Growth in the Norwegian Progress Party from 1973 to 2008 (Master's thesis). University of Bergen. hdl:1956/3080.
- Simonsen, Tor Espen (2007). Høyrepopulismens politiske metamorfose på 1990-tallet. En komparativ studie av tre nordiske partier: Fremskridtspartiet, Dansk Folkeparti og Fremskrittspartiet (Master's thesis) (in Norwegian). CULCOM. Archived from the original on 16 March 2011.
- Skjørestad, Anna (2008). Et liberalistisk parti? Fremskrittspartiets politiske profil fra 1989 til 2005 (Master's thesis) (in Norwegian). University of Bergen. hdl:1956/2927.
- Widfeldt, Anders (2014). Extreme Right in Scandinavia. Routledge. ISBN 978-1134502158.
