= 1987 Norwegian local elections =

Election in Norway

Country-wide local elections for seats in municipality and county councils were held throughout Norway on 13 and 14 September 1987. For most places this meant that two elections, the municipal elections and the county elections ran concurrently.

== Results ==
=== Municipal elections ===
Results of the 1987 municipal elections.

Party	Votes	%
Labour Party	747,721	35.32
Conservative Party	494,680	23.36
Progress Party	225,671	10.66
Christian Democratic Party	165,195	7.80
Centre Party	153,034	7.23
Socialist Left Party	116,653	5.51
Liberal Party	82,824	3.91
Red Electoral Alliance	26,444	1.25
Liberal People's Party	5,384	0.25
Communist Party	2,051	0.10
Others	97,527	4.61
Total	2,117,184	100.00

=== County elections ===
Results of the 1987 county elections.

Party	Votes	%
Labour Party		35.9
Conservative Party		23.7
Progress Party		12.3
Christian Democratic Party		8.1
Centre Party		6.8
Socialist Left Party		5.7
Liberal Party		3.3
Red Electoral Alliance		1.3
Liberal People's Party		0.4
Communist Party		0.3
Others		0.9
Total		
