= Skutle =

Skutle is a Norwegian surname. Notable people with the surname include:

- Erik Skutle (born 1990), Norwegian politician
- Nils Skutle (born 1953) Norwegian sports executive
