= Halden Prison =

Maximum-security prison in Halden, Norway

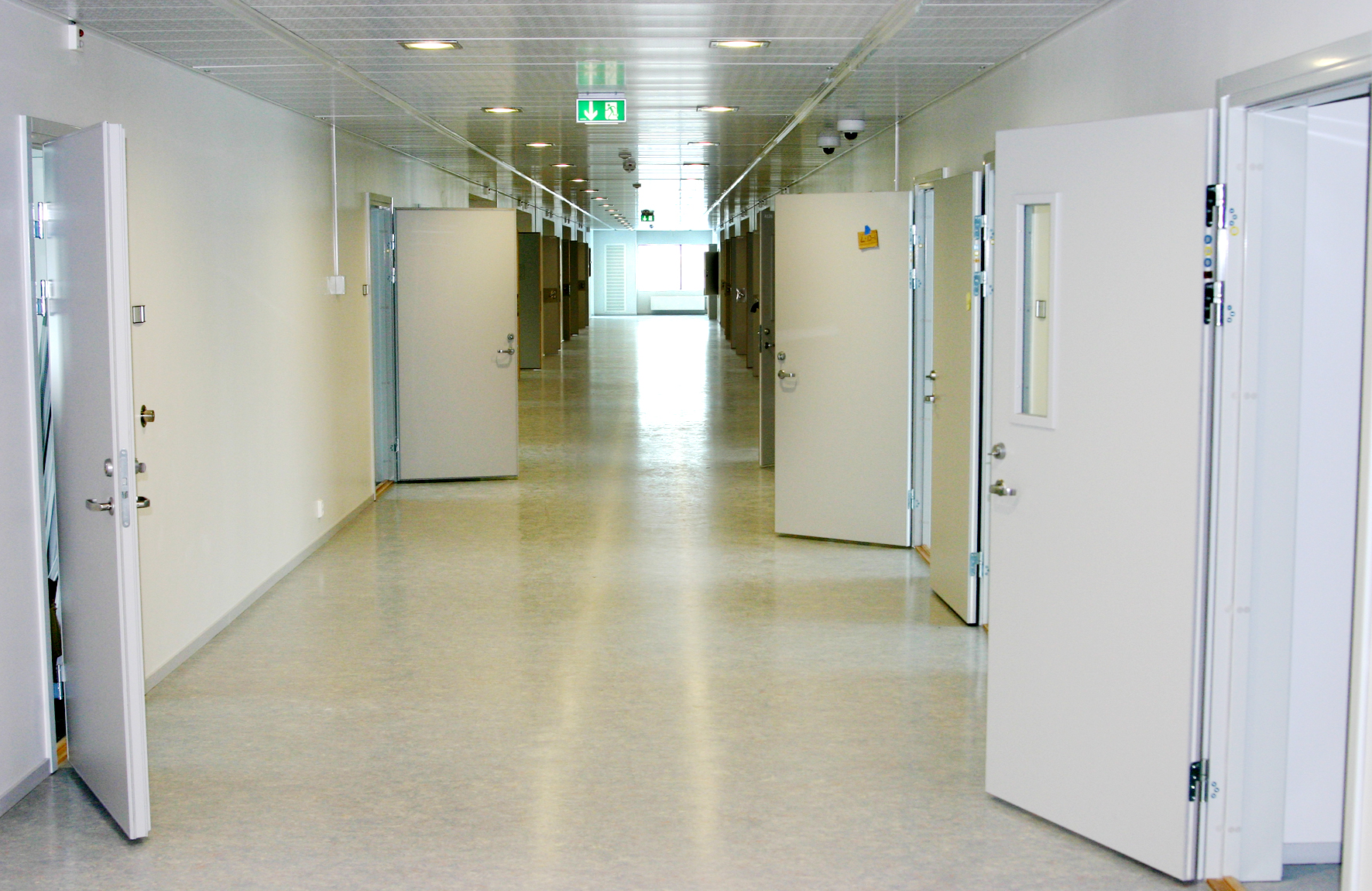
- Interior of the prison
- Interactive map of Halden Prison
- Location: Halden, Norway; 59°8′25.703″N 11°17′11.55″E
- Status: Operational
- Security class: Maximum
- Capacity: 248–252 (Note: The total capacity is contested; Statistics Norway and Norwegian Broadcasting Corporation say it is 248, while government's official site states it is 251, and Time and Northern Dimension Partnership in Public Health and Social Well-being affirm it is 252.)
- Population: 251 (2015)
- Opened: April 8, 2010
- Managed by: Norwegian Correctional Service
- Governor: Are Høidal
- Website: www.haldenfengsel.no

Halden Prison (Norwegian: Halden fengsel) is a maximum-security prison in Halden, Norway. It has three main units and has no conventional security devices. The third-largest prison in Norway, it was established in 2010 with a focus on rehabilitation; its design simulates life outside the prison. Among other activities, sports and music are available to the prisoners, who interact with the unarmed staff to create a sense of community. Praised for its humane conditions, Halden Prison has received the Arnstein Arneberg Award for its interior design in 2010 and been the subject of a documentary, but has also received criticism for being too liberal.

== Overview ==
Located in Halden, Østfold, Norway, Halden Prison was built for over 10 years at a cost of 1.5 billion Norwegian kroner ($252 million/£138 million/€150 million). The prison received its first inmates on March 1, 2010 and was officially opened on April 8 by the Norwegian King Harald V. It is Norway's second-largest prison with a capacity of 248–252 prisoners and a site of 75 acres (30 ha).

As a maximum-security prison, it hosts both dangerous and highly dangerous individuals, such as people with convictions for rape, murder, and drug dealing. They compose half of the population, while a third of the residents have been convicted of drug-related offenses. People with convictions for sexual offenses, who may face violence from other inmates, and prisoners who require close psychiatric or medical supervision, are located in Unit A, a restrictive and separated area. There is also a special unit (C8) focused on addiction recovery. Most inmates live in Units B and C, which are freer and have mixed cell blocks. Halden Prison receives both domestic and international criminals; as only around three-fifths of the prisoners are Norwegians (as of 2015), both Norwegian and English are used, and the prison has English teachers. However, fluency in Norwegian is a requirement to live in C8, because group and individual counseling is conducted in Norwegian.

Halden has no razor wire, lethal electric fences, or towers manned by armed guards, all features of many high-security prisons in the United States, with which Halden has been contrasted. However, there is safety glass, a 6 m × 1,500 m (20 ft × 4,921 ft) concrete and steel wall, and a system of tunnels which guards use to walk through the prison. Although there are surveillance cameras on the prison grounds, they are not present in the cells, the cell hallways, the common rooms, the classrooms, and most of the workshops. While there is little violence reported, and it occurs almost exclusively in Unit A, officers try to prevent it. If two inmates have a dispute, they engage in a mediation session under staff supervision. If mediation fails, repeated misbehavior or rule violations are punished with cell confinement or prison transference.

== Design ==
The prison was designed by the Danish group Erik Møller Architects and the Norwegian HLM Arkitektur AS, selected in a competition held by the Department of Justice and the Norwegian Directorate of Public Construction and Property to determine the designers of the building.

With a focus on rehabilitation, it was designed to simulate a village so that the prisoners can consider themselves part of society. The government believes that "the smaller the difference between life inside and outside the prison, the easier the transition from prison to freedom." Interiors are painted and designed to demarcate the differences between home, school, and the workplace. In designing the prison's interiors, the architects tried to separate the internal buildings to have prisoners walking, to strengthen their bond with the outside world. The hallways are tiled with Moroccan tiles or have large-scale photographs, such as daffodils or Parisian streets.

Exteriors are composed of bricks, galvanized steel, and larch wood, instead of concrete. The black and red kiln-fired bricks were inspired by the trees, mosses, and bedrock of the surroundings. Natural life, including birch, blueberry, and pine trees, also contribute to rehabilitation. The steel, a "hard" material, symbolizes detention, while the larch, a "soft" material, stands for rehabilitation and growth. The yard walls and toilet doors are decorated by a graffiti painting by the Norwegian artist Dolk, which was ordered by the prison from its 6 million kroner ($1 million/£640,000) art budget.

All aspects of the prison's design aim to avoid psychological pressures, conflicts, and interpersonal friction. Despite this, the prison wall was designed for security. As the wall is visible everywhere, it was seen as a "symbol and an instrument" of "[the prisoners'] punishment, taking away their freedom", according to Gudrun Molden, one of its architects.

== Prison life ==
Each prison cell is 10 square metres (110 sq ft) and has a flat-screen television, desk, mini-fridge, toilet with shower, and unbarred vertical window that lets in more light. Every 10–12 cells share a common area with a kitchen and a living room; the kitchen has stainless steel silverware, porcelain plates, and a dining table, and the living room has a modular couch and a video game system. While the prison provides food, the prisoners can also buy ingredients at its grocery shop and cook their own meals. Inmates are locked in their cells twelve hours a day, but they are encouraged to maximize their time outside. Prisoners have an incentive of 53 kroner ($9/£5.60) a day to leave their cells. Are Høidal, the prison's governor, stated that the fewer activities the prisoners have, the more aggressive they become. There is an "Activities House", and from 8 a.m. to 8 p.m, there are practices on jogging trails and a football field, while wood working, cooking, and music classes are also offered. At the mixing studio, the inmates may record music and a monthly program broadcast by the local radio station. A library with books, magazines, CDs and DVDs; a gym with a rock-climbing wall; and a chapel are also available. Prisoners even receive questionnaires asking how their prison experience can be improved.

Inmates are allowed to receive their families, partners, or friends privately twice a week for two hours. Individual rooms containing a sofa, sink, and cupboard with sheets, towels, and condoms are available for single-person visits. For those with families, a larger room with toys and baby-changing facilities is available. Inmates are checked after visits, and if illegal items are found, prisoners can lose their rights to private visits. This right is denied to high risk criminals and visitors with histories of drug offenses. There is also a separated, chalet-style house where prisoners can receive visits from family members and stay with them for 24 hours. The house has a small kitchen, two bedrooms, a bathroom, a living room with a dining table, a sofa, and a television, as well as an outdoor play area with toys. This privilege is not allowed to non-Norwegian prisoners, and inmates have to complete a child-development education program to have 24-hour-long visits. During visits, staff make regular checks on the prisoners and their families.

== Staff ==
As of 2012, Halden had 340 staff members, including teachers, healthcare workers, personal trainers, and guards (who also work as social workers due to their 2 year course that they have to take before becoming a guard). The philosophy of "dynamic security", which encourages the staff and the inmates to develop interpersonal relationships, helps prevent potential aggression and guarantees safety. Guards eat meals and play sports with the inmates, and are typically unarmed because guns can produce intimidation and social distance. The interaction between prisoners and the staff is designed "to create a sense of family," according to architect Per Hojgaard Nielsen, and because the staff can be role models to help the inmates to recreate their sense of daily routine, for application outside of prison walls once their sentence is over. Half the guards are women, as Høidal thinks it minimizes aggression. The guard stations were also designed to be tiny and cramped, to encourage officers to interact more with the inmates.

== Impact ==
Halden city's inhabitants view the prison as a chance to find employment rather than a bad thing. Nina Margareta Høie of the web magazine The Nordic Page stated that the prison is "known for having the most humanly conditions in Europe," while William Lee James of Time and Amelia Gentleman from The Guardian called it the world's "most humane prison." The BBC reported that the design of Scottish prison HMP Grampian was inspired by Halden. Architect group Bryden Wood, which are the team responsible for the redesign of HMP Wellingborough, looked after Halden as they considered it one of "world-leading examples" of how a rehabilitation-focused prison should be.

In 2010, Halden Prison was shortlisted for the World Architecture Festival Awards, and its interior design earned the Arnstein Arneberg Award. In 2014, as part of Wim Wenders' 3D documentary series Cathedrals of Culture, Michael Madsen directed a short film exploring how the prison's design and architecture influence the re-socialization process. That same year, another film on Halden Prison was produced: The Norden, a television film produced by the Finnish Broadcasting Company, explored the reactions of James Conway, a former superintendent at New York's Attica Correctional Facility, during a prison tour. Conway affirmed: "This is prison utopia. I don't think you can go any more liberal — other than giving the inmates the keys." In his 2015 documentary Where to Invade Next, filmmaker Michael Moore presented Halden Prison as an example of how the USA should manage its prison system.

However, the conservative, right-wing populist Progress Party has criticized Halden Prison. When foreigners in Norwegian prisons increased from 8.6 percent in 2000 to 34.2 percent in 2014, Per Sandberg, former deputy leader of the party, attributed this to "Halden's high standard", arguing that Halden's facilities should be reserved for Norwegian citizens. The party also contended that Halden's quality of life is "better than in many nursing and retirement homes". British Channel 5 broadcast a 45-minute documentary about Halden titled World's Most Luxurious Prison in November 2020. (Note: Channel 5's official website indicates the documentary was broadcast on November 3, 2020, but secondary sources like Entertainment Daily and The Guardian reported it aired on November 12, 2020.) It was presented by conservative politician Ann Widdecombe, who mostly criticized it and said a prison should not be like "normal life".

== See also ==
- Bastøy Prison
- Egalitarianism
- Haren Prison, a large modern prison on the edge of Brussels that opened in 2022.
- Incarceration in Norway
- List of countries by incarceration rate
