= Komafest =

2012 urban art event in Vardø, Norway

Komafest was an urban art and graffiti event organized in Vardø, Norway. Tens of mostly abandoned buildings were decorated by international artists in the period 5–21 July 2012, culminating in a grand opening and a guided town tour attended by hundreds.

The event was curated by noted Norwegian urban artist Pøbel. Participating artists were Stephen Powers (United States), "Vhils" (Portugal), "Roa" (Belgium), Atle Østrem (Norway), "Ethos" (Brazil), "E. B. Itso", "Husk mit navn" (both Denmark), "Horfe", Ken Sortais, "Remed" (all France) and Conor Harrington (Ireland).

== Background ==
Vardø is Norway's north-easternmost town, located in Vardø Municipality in Finnmark county. Traditionally a vibrant fishing community, the town's population halved between the 1960s and 2000s. As per 2012, depopulation had balanced out and Vardø had 2,122 inhabitants. Because of the population decline, Vardø was left with many empty buildings in various stages of disrepair. Pøbel wanted to organize a larger scale continuation of the "Getto spedalsk" ("Ghetto leperous") project, where he and collaborator Dolk painted abandoned buildings in at the Lofoten islands.

After securing the cooperation of local developers in spring 2012, the project started getting permission from individual property owners to decorate buildings. The name "Komafest" plays on the notion of the houses being roused from their sleep by the activity.

== The festival ==
Although substantial financing had been secured from, among others, the Northern Norway Artists' Centre, much of the daily activity relied on volunteer work and free use of privately owned heavy equipment, including lifts and cranes. "Pøbel" himself insisted the festival was as much about the locals and the town as it was the art, saying he hoped that the festival would be a catalyst for renovation and increased enthusiasm for local history. Early on, the 100-year-old municipal cinema, closed for over 20 years and used as a warehouse, was cleared and used to host a lecture by author Tristan Manco and screen street art films.

After the opening weekend, the festival secured financing, equipment and political permission to realise the long-planned idea of planting an old bus next to the underwater tunnel that leads to Vardø. The bus was previously used to transport families and their belongings out of Vardø during the era of mass de-population.
