= Erna Solberg =

Prime Minister of Norway from 2013 to 2021

Erna Solberg MP
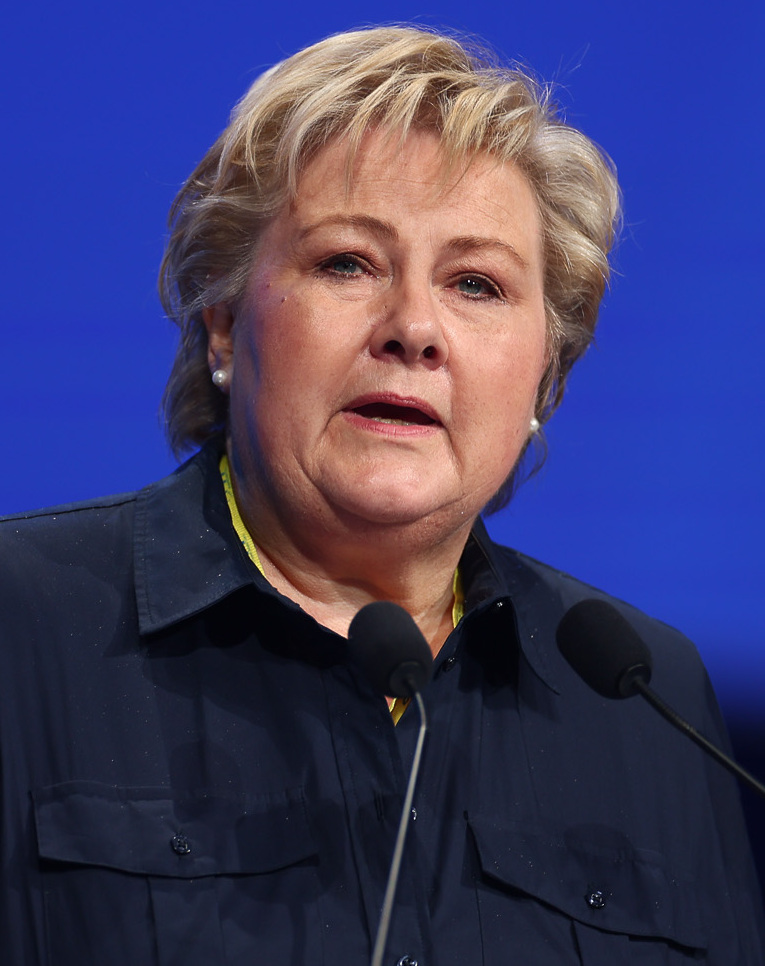
- Solberg in 2025

Prime Minister of Norway
- In office 16 October 2013 – 14 October 2021
- Monarch: Harald V
- Preceded by: Jens Stoltenberg
- Succeeded by: Jonas Gahr Støre

Leader of the Opposition
- In office 14 October 2021 – 1 October 2025
- Monarch: Harald V
- Prime Minister: Jonas Gahr Støre
- Preceded by: Jonas Gahr Støre
- Succeeded by: Sylvi Listhaug
- In office 17 October 2005 – 16 October 2013
- Monarch: Harald V
- Prime Minister: Jens Stoltenberg
- Preceded by: Jens Stoltenberg
- Succeeded by: Jens Stoltenberg

Leader of the Conservative Party
- In office 9 May 2004 – 14 February 2026
- First Deputy: Per-Kristian Foss; Jan Tore Sanner; Henrik Asheim
- Second Deputy: Jan Tore Sanner; Erling Lae; Bent Høie; Tina Bru
- Preceded by: Jan Petersen
- Succeeded by: Ine Eriksen Søreide

Minister of Local Government and Regional Development
- In office 19 October 2001 – 17 October 2005
- Prime Minister: Kjell Magne Bondevik
- Preceded by: Sylvia Brustad
- Succeeded by: Åslaug Haga

Leader of the Conservative Women's Association
- In office 7 March 1993 – 29 March 1998
- Preceded by: Siri Frost Sterri
- Succeeded by: Sonja Sjøli

Member of the Storting
- Incumbent
- Assumed office 2 October 1989
- Deputy: Silja Ekeland Bjørkly; Eli Årdal Berland; Erik Skutle; Liv Kari Eskeland; Charlotte Spurkeland
- Constituency: Hordaland

Personal details
- Born: 24 February 1961 (age 65) Bergen, Hordaland, Norway
- Party: Conservative
- Spouse: Sindre Finnes (m. 1996)
- Children: 2
- Education: University of Bergen
- Website: https://erna.no/

Erna Solberg (Norwegian: [ˈæ̀ːɳɑ ˈsûːlbærɡ]; born 24 February 1961) is a Norwegian politician and was the Leader of the Opposition from 2021 to 2025. She served as the prime minister of Norway from 2013 to 2021, and as the leader of the Conservative Party from 2004 to 2026.

Solberg was first elected to the Storting in 1989, and served as Minister of Local Government and Regional Development in Bondevik's Second Cabinet from 2001 to 2005. During her tenure, she oversaw the tightening of immigration policy and the preparation of a proposed reform of the administrative divisions of Norway. After the 2005 election, she chaired the Conservative Party parliamentary group until 2013. Solberg has emphasized the social and ideological basis of Conservative policies, though the party also has become visibly more pragmatic.

After winning the 2013 parliamentary election, Solberg became Norway's second female prime minister, after Gro Harlem Brundtland. She led a minority coalition government of the Conservative and Progress parties, known as the "Blue-Blue Cabinet," with support from the Liberal and Christian Democratic parties. Her government was re-elected in 2017 and later expanded to formally include the Liberal Party in 2018 and the Christian Democratic Party in 2019, securing a parliamentary majority. Solberg became the longest-serving Conservative prime minister in Norwegian history in 2018. Following the 2021 election, her government lost its majority, and she resigned, returning to the role of Leader of the Opposition. In 2025, after the Conservative Party was defeated in the general election, Solberg announced she would step down as party leader in 2026.

== Early life and education ==
Solberg was born 24 February 1961 in Bergen in western Norway and grew up in the affluent Kalfaret neighbourhood. Her father, Asbjørn Solberg (1926–1989), worked as a consultant in the Bergen Sporvei, and her mother, Inger Wenche Torgersen (1928–2016), was an office worker. Her parents are both executives. Solberg has two sisters, one older, one younger.

Solberg had some struggles at school and at the age of 16 she was diagnosed with dyslexia. She was nevertheless an active and talkative contributor in class. In her final year as a high-school student in 1979, she was elected to the board of the School Student Union of Norway, and in the same year led the national charity event Operasjon Dagsverk, in which students collected money for Jamaica.

In 1986, she graduated with her cand.mag. degree in sociology, political science, statistics and economics from the University of Bergen. In her final year, she led the Students' League of the Conservative Party in Bergen.

Since 1996 she has been married to Sindre Finnes, a businessman and former Conservative Party politician, with whom she has two children. The family has lived in both Bergen and Oslo.

== Early political career ==
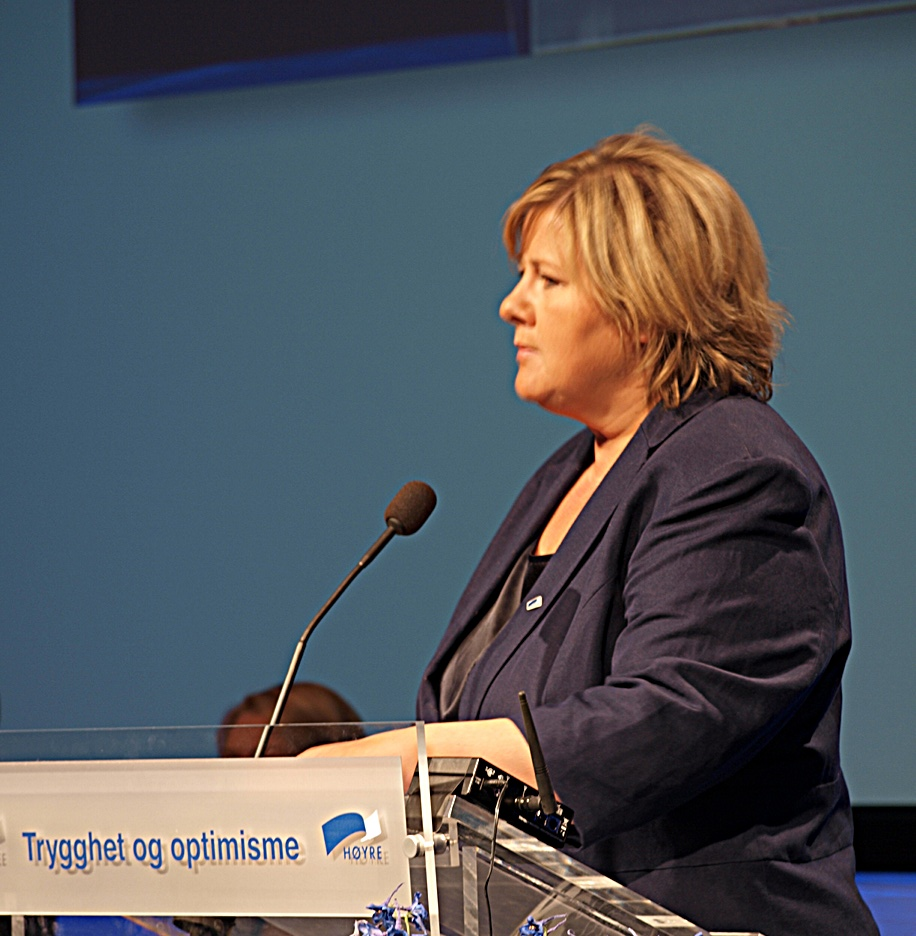
Erna Solberg during a party congress in May 2009.

=== Local government ===
Solberg was a deputy member of Bergen city council in the periods 1979–1983 and 1987–1989, the last period on the executive committee. She chaired local and municipal chapters of the Young Conservatives and the Conservative Party.

=== Parliamentarian ===
She was first elected to the Storting (Norwegian Parliament) from Hordaland in 1989 and has been re-elected five times. She was also the leader of the national Conservative Women's Association, from 1994 to 1998.

=== Minister of Local Government and Regional Development ===
From 2001 to 2005 Solberg served as the Minister of Local Government and Regional Development under Prime Minister Kjell Magne Bondevik. Her alleged tough policies in this department, including a firm stance on asylum policy, earned her the nickname "Jern-Erna" (Norwegian for "Iron Erna") in the media.

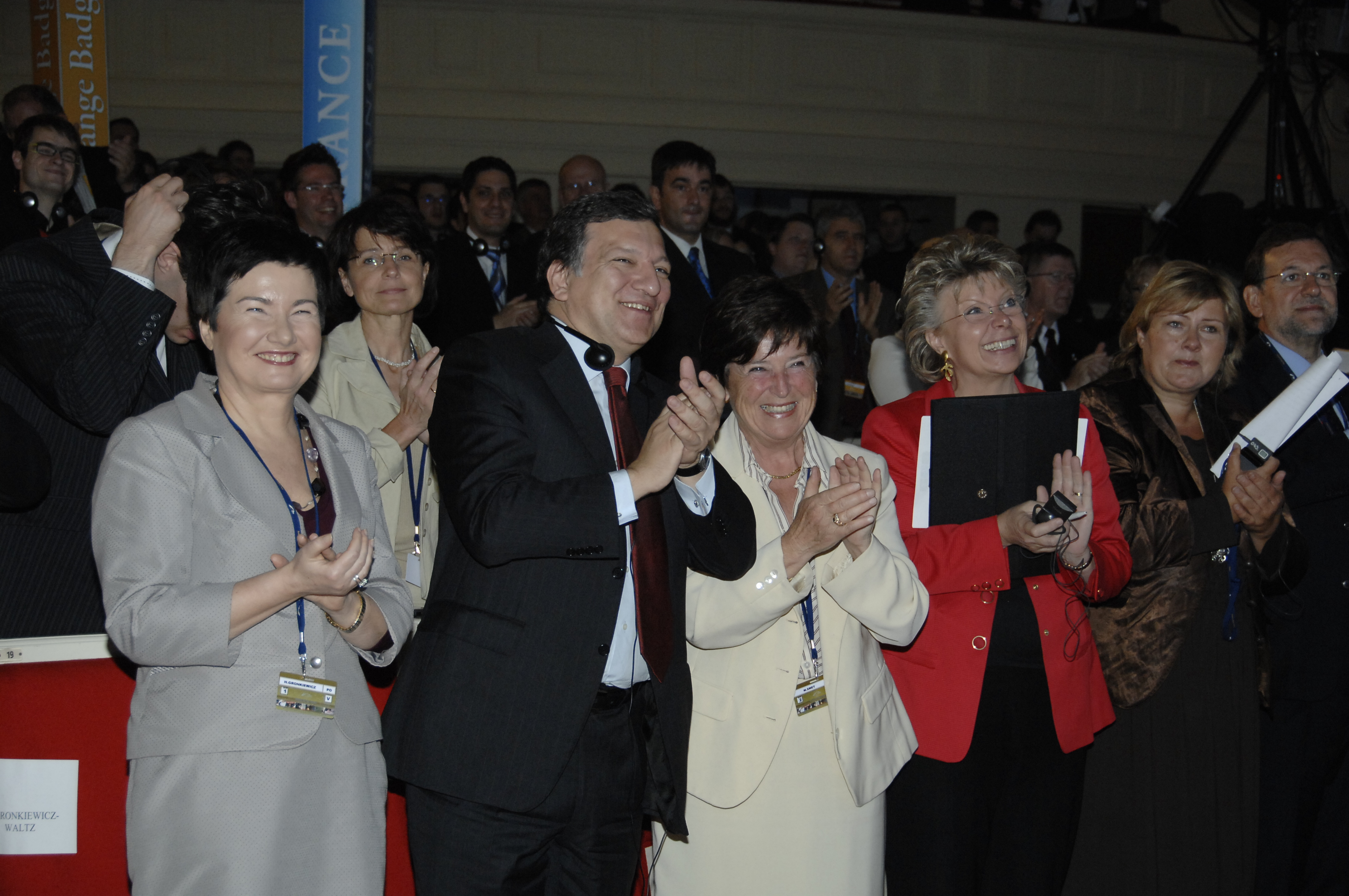
Solberg, José Manuel Barroso and Mariano Rajoy at European People's Party Congress in Warsaw in 2009

In fact, numbers show that the Bondevik government, of 2001–2005, actually let in thousands more asylum seekers than the subsequent centre-left Red-Green government, of 2005–2009. In 2003, Solberg proposed introducing Islamic Sharia Councils in Norway after being informed of the existence of such councils in the United Kingdom, and, in 2004, said that she wished to increase immigration to Norway.

As Minister, Solberg instructed the Norwegian Directorate of Immigration to expel Mulla Krekar, being a danger to national security. Later, terrorism charges were filed against Krekar for a death threat he uttered in 2010 against Erna Solberg.

She had Mordechai Vanunu denied political asylum so as not to damage relations with Israel.

=== Party leader ===
She served as deputy leader of the Conservative Party from 2002 to 2004 and, in 2004, she became the party leader.

After losing the 2009 elections, the party realised that a mere promise of tax cuts and a smaller role for the state would not convince voters. Solberg therefore abandoned her rhetoric that had earned her the nickname "Iron Erna" in the past and began to explain that a different approach was needed - instead of cuts, she wanted to reform, instead of dismantling the welfare state, she wanted to manage its structures more efficiently.

In 2011, she published a book called People, Not Billions, which could be better described as a new programme manifesto. She made regular visits to schools, health facilities and smaller municipalities, explaining to all that the goal was not to serve big business but to create conditions for the creation of new jobs, infrastructure development and economic restructuring. Solberg saw her long-term economic goal of moving Norway's economy out of dependence on oil revenues as achievable through traditional right-wing methods of tax cuts, spending reductions and privatisation of state shares in companies. In addition, she promised to maintain free education and free health care.

== Prime Minister of Norway (2013–2021) ==
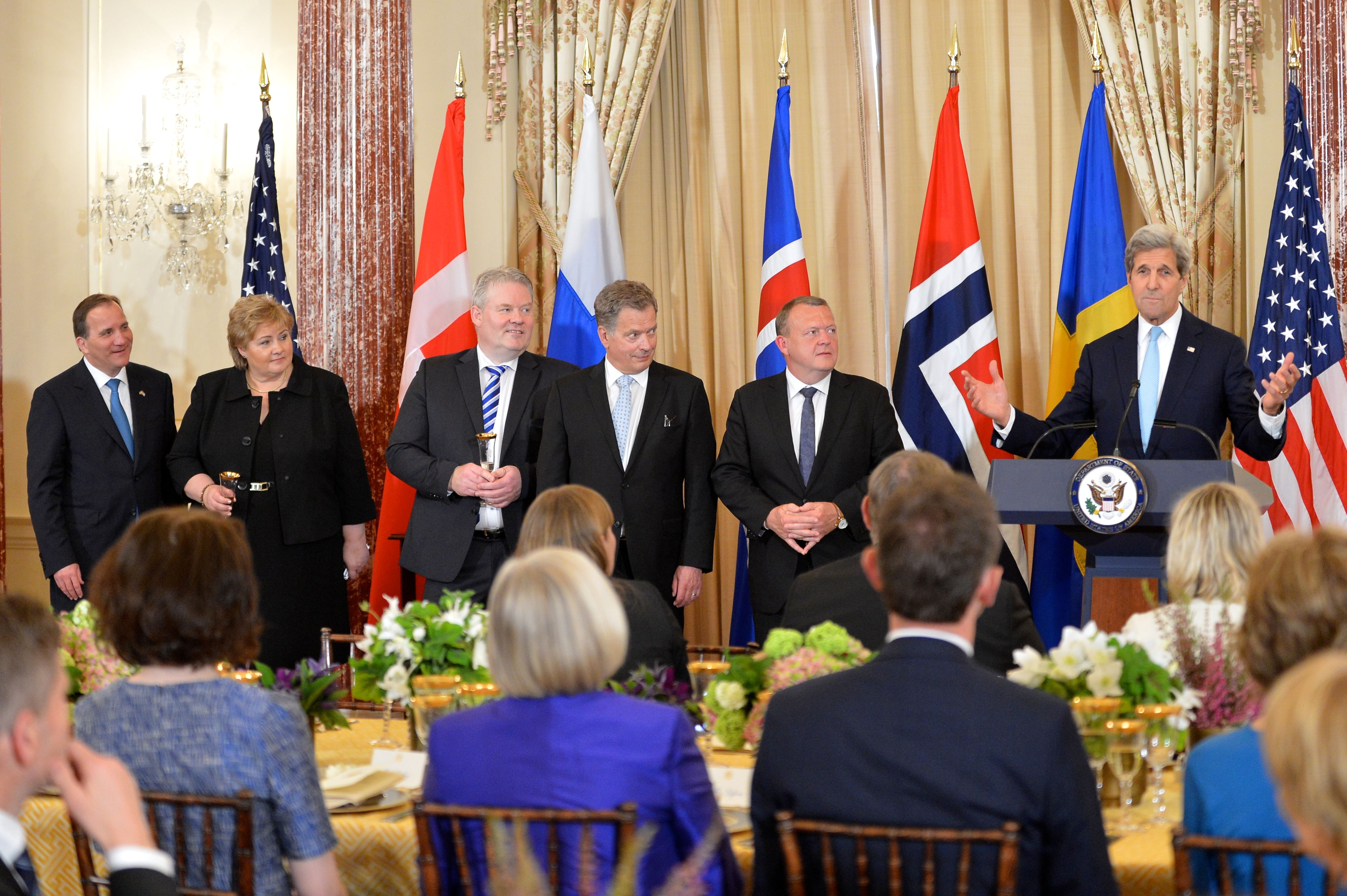
Solberg and other Nordic leaders in Washington, D.C., 13 May 2016

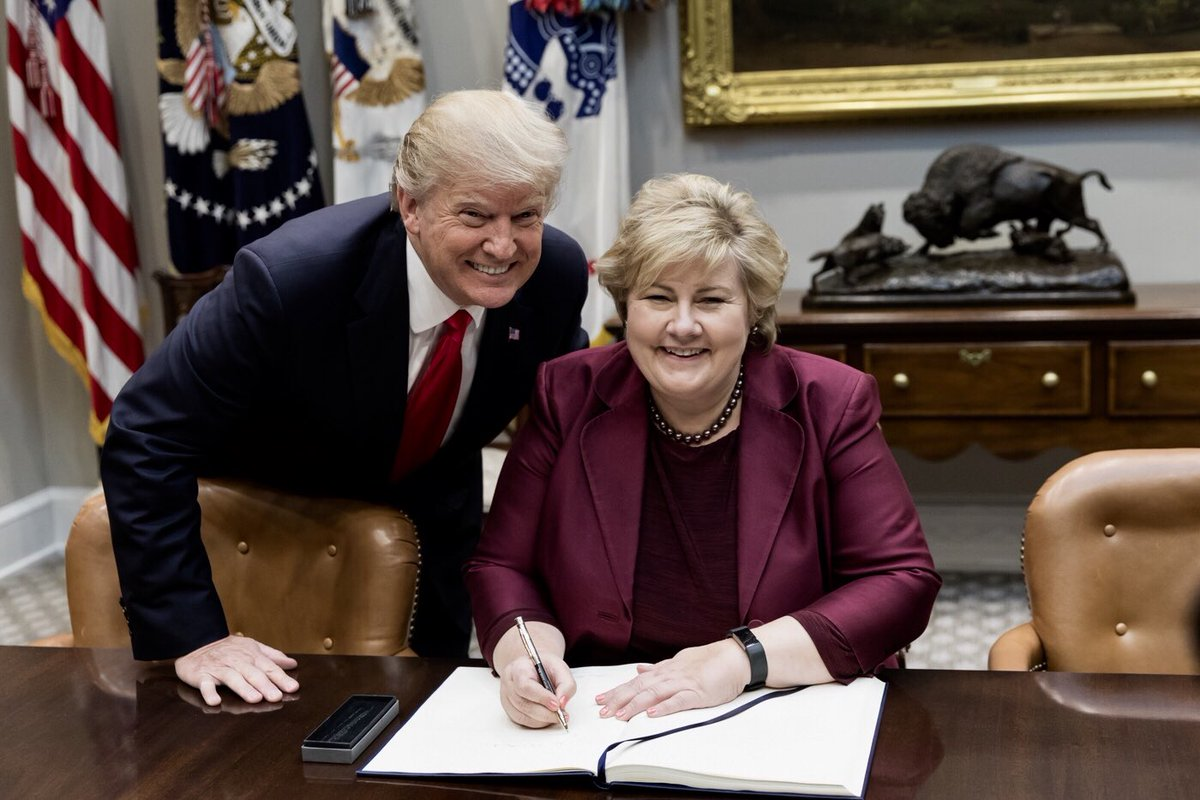
Solberg and U.S. President Donald Trump in 2018

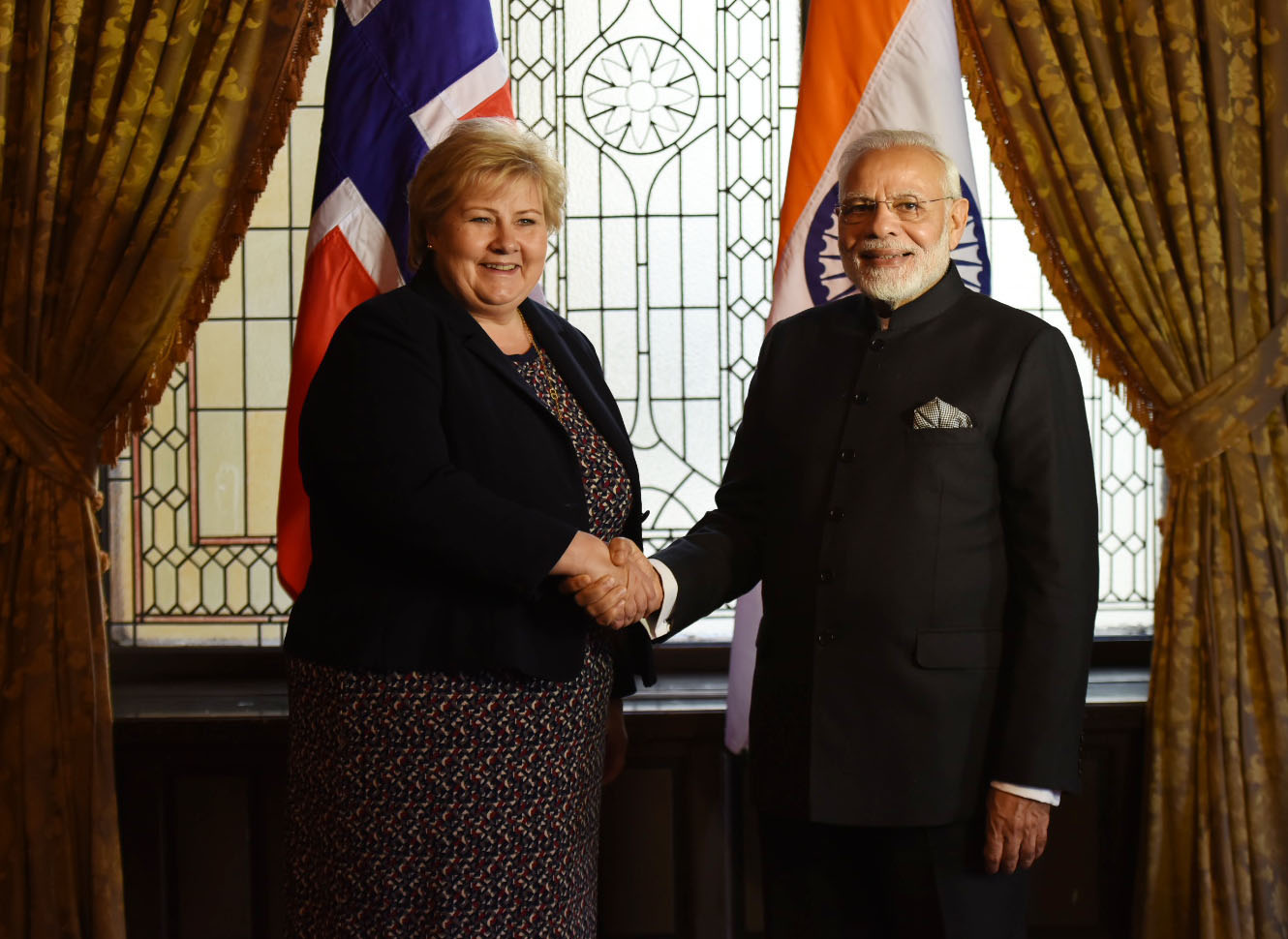
Solberg met with Indian Prime Minister Narendra Modi on the sidelines of India-Nordic Summit, in Stockholm in April 2018

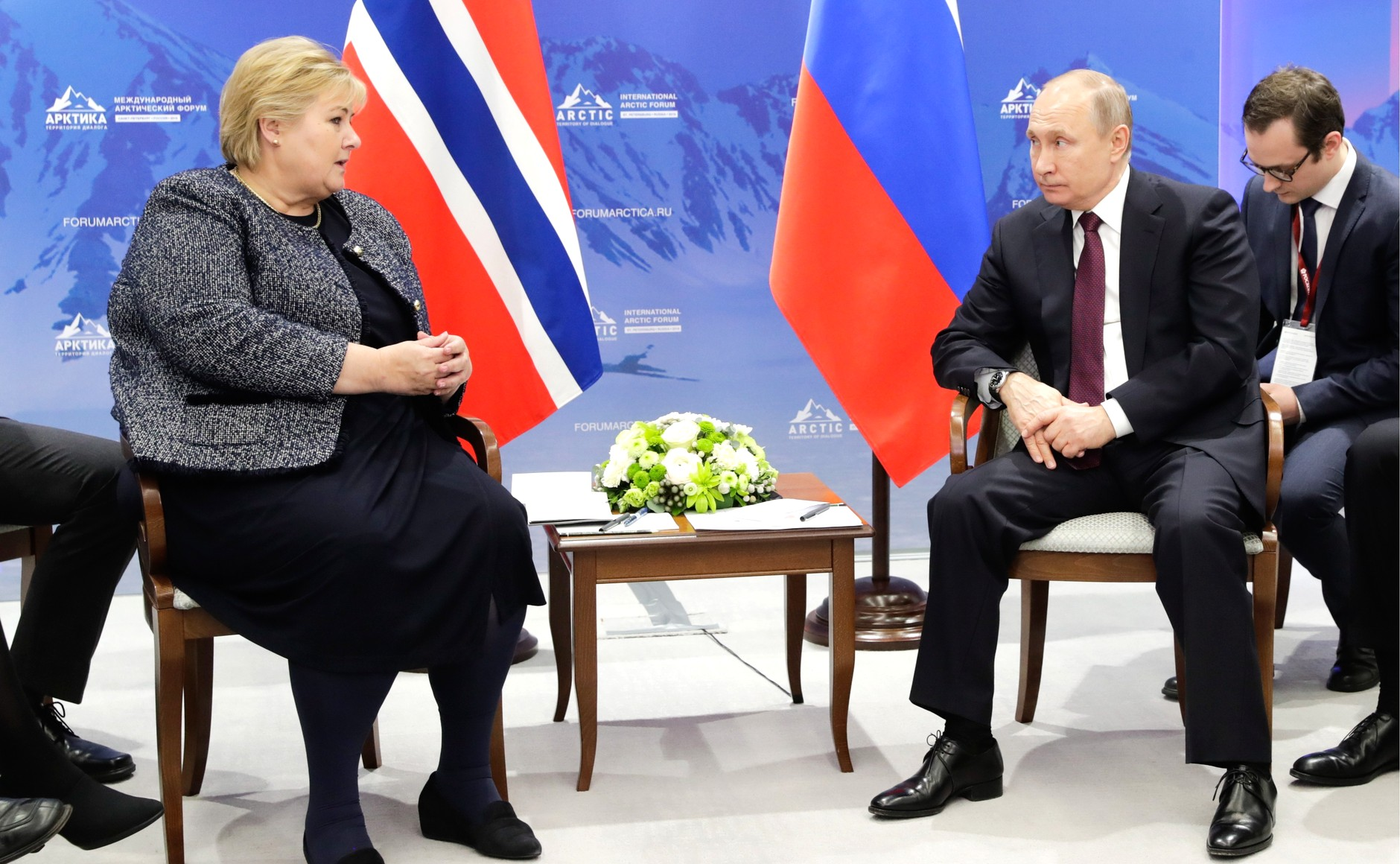
Solberg met with Russian President Vladimir Putin the V International Arctic Forum, in Saint Petersburg on 9 April 2019

Solberg became the head of government after winning the general election on 9 September 2013 and was appointed prime minister on 16 October 2013. Solberg is Norway's second female prime minister after Gro Harlem Brundtland.

The Government was re-elected in 2017, making Solberg the country's first conservative leader to win re-election since the 1980s. The centre-right parties were also able to maintain the majority in the Storting.

Erna Solberg has combined numerous national positions as Minister, Parliamentarian and regional politician with a strong commitment to global solutions for development, growth and conflict resolution.

She also negotiated with the Liberals to join the government in 2018. The Liberals officially joined the Solberg Cabinet on 17 January 2018. After the Christian Democrats alliance conflict that lasted from September to November 2018, they eventually negotiated to join the Solberg Cabinet on the grounds of a minor change in the abortion law, something that caused harsh backlash from the public and critics alike. The Christian Democrats officially joined the Cabinet on 22 January 2019.

She faced tensions between the components of her majority, leading to a break with the Progress Party.

She inherited the nickname "Iron Erna", in reference to the former British Prime Minister Margaret Thatcher, for her relentless management of the migration crisis in 2015, during which she had tightened reception conditions.

To cope with the fall in oil prices in March 2020, her government adopted a series of measures to support businesses, such as simplifying procedures for temporary layoffs of employees, and tax privileges.

=== COVID-19 pandemic in Norway ===
One day after her 60th birthday in 2021 during the COVID-19 pandemic in Norway, Solberg breached national health guidelines by going to a restaurant in Geilo with her husband and 13 family members to celebrate her birthday. The guidelines stated that restaurants only can hold 10 people of the same cohort. In March, she apologised for breaching guidelines and that she didn't think of it properly before being questioned by NRK. She further stated that she should have known better. She was fined 20,000 NOK ($2,352) after a police investigation was conducted.

On 24 September 2021, her government announced a lift for all national major measures, taking effect the day after at 4:00pm, officially reopening the country.

=== International engagements ===
As Prime Minister, and former Chair of the Norwegian delegation to the NATO Parliamentary Assembly, she has championed transatlantic values and security.

In 2018 she assembled a global High Level Panel on sustainable ocean economy and introduced the topic at the G7 Summit. Her government supports the World Bank's PROBLUE initiative to prevent marine damage.

From 2016 the Prime Minister has co-chaired the UN Secretary General's Advocacy group for the Sustainable Development Goals. Among the goals, she takes a particular interest in access to quality education for all, in particular girls and children in conflict areas. This was also central in her work as MDG Advocate from 2014 to 2016.

In one her many keynote speeches she stated that there is still a need for traditional aid and humanitarian assistance in marginalised and conflict-ridden areas of the world. The SDGs, however, take a holistic view of global development, and integrate economic, social and environmental factors.

Solberg has shown particular interest in gender issues, such as girl's rights and education. Together with Graça Machel she has expressed the hope that by 2030 no factors such as poverty, gender and cultural beliefs will prevent any of today's ambitious young girls from standing confidently on the world stage.

In 2016, she delivered the Fullerton lecture in Singapore, titled "The Global Goals - a road map to a Sustainable, Fair and More Peaceful Future".

Solberg has secured significant financial support for the Global Partnership for Education and hosted the Global Finance Facility for women's and children's health pledging Conference in Oslo in November 2018. Her firm belief is that investment in education will accelerate progress on all other SDG goals.

In April 2017, she held a speech on globalization and development at Peking University in Beijing.

She was awarded the inaugural Global Citizen World Leader Award in 2018 for her international engagement.

In October 2019, she criticized the unilateral Turkish invasion of the Kurdish areas in Syria, but dismissed calls for suspending Turkey from NATO.

In Solberg's speech to the UN General Assembly in 2019 she advocated for Norway's candidacy for a non-permanent seat on the Security Council for 2021–2022. She upheld that UN needs to be strengthened and that the world needs strong multilateral cooperation and institutions to tackle global challenges such as climate change, cyber security and terrorism.

In May 2021, it was reported that Danish Defence Intelligence Service collaborated with National Security Agency to wiretap on fellow EU members and leaders, leading to wide backlash among EU countries and demands for explanation from Danish and American governments. Solberg said that, "It's unacceptable if countries which have close allied co-operation feel the need to spy on one another."

=== Other news stories ===
In April 2008, it was revealed that Solberg, as Minister of Local Government and Regional Development in 2004, had rejected a request for asylum in Norway by the Israeli nuclear whistleblower Mordechai Vanunu. While the Norwegian Directorate of Immigration had been prepared to grant Vanunu asylum, it was then decided that the application could not be accepted because Vanunu's application had been made outside the borders of Norway. An unclassified document revealed that Solberg and the government considered that extraditing Vanunu from Israel could be seen as an action against Israel and thus unfitting to the Norwegian government's traditional position as a friend of Israel and as a political player in the Middle East. Solberg rejected this criticism and defended her decision.

In 2014, she participated at the Agriculture and Food meeting which was held by Sylvi Listhaug where Minister of Transportation Ketil Solvik-Olsen and Minister of Climate and Environment Tine Sundtoft also were present. Later on, the four took a picture which appeared on the Government.no website on 14 March the same year. In April of the same year she criticized European Court over data retention which Telenor Group argued can be used without court proceedings.

In 2017, the Russian Embassy in Oslo had accused Norwegian officials and intelligence of using "false and disconnected anti-Russian rhetoric" and "scaring Norway's population" about a "mythical Russian threat". In response, Prime Minister Solberg said: "This is an example of Russian propaganda that often comes when there's a focus on security policy. There is nothing in this that's new to us."

Solberg has tried to maintain and improve the China–Norway relations, which have been damaged since the Norwegian Nobel Committee decided to give the Nobel Peace Prize to Chinese dissident Liu Xiaobo in 2010. In response to his death, caused by organ failure while in government custody on 13 July 2017, Solberg said: "It is with deep grief that I received the news of Liu Xiaobo's passing. Liu Xiaobo was for decades a central voice for human rights and China's further development."

=== Defeat ===
In the 2021 election, center-left parties won the majority of seats and Solberg conceded defeat.

== Post–premiership ==
On 20 May 2022, it was announced that Solberg was becoming a board member of Global Citizen. Of her entry, she said: "I say yes to this position because Global Citizen is perhaps the organization in the world that has the greatest potential to mobilize people, especially young people around the world, to fight poverty and achieve the UN's sustainability goals".

On 13 November 2023, Solberg announced that she would continue as leader of the Conservative Party and be their candidate for prime minister at the 2025 parliamentary election. In the election, her party slipped to third place, their worst result since the 2005 election. After an internal party review, she announced her resignation as party leader.

In the 2023 Norwegian local elections, the Conservatives won the most votes under Solberg. It was the first time since 1924 that the Labour Party failed to win the most votes in a national election.

=== Husband's share trading controversy ===
In the run up to the 2023 local elections, media outlets wrote that Solberg's husband Sindre Finnes had been active in the share market during Solberg's premiership. She said she was unaware of his purchases and had declared herself impartial in dealing with companies Finnes had shares in. A full list of the 3600 share transactions in different companies was released on 15 September, four days after the election, when she also issued a public apology. The National Authority for Investigation and Prosecution of Economic and Environmental Crime announced that it would consider opening an investigation into the matter. On 3 November, it announced that it would not pursue an investigation into Finnes.

On 7 November 2023, Solberg answered questions during a hearing by the parliament's Standing Committee on Scrutiny and Constitutional Affairs. On 21 November, the committee put forward further 12 questions. It is estimated that Finnes bought more 112 million Norwegian kroner in shares while Solberg was a prime minister. The number of transactions, is estimated to be more than three thousand. The media wrote that Solberg had a conflict of interest, even if she did not know about every transaction.

On 26 November, E24 wrote that some of Solberg's closest advisors at the Office of the Prime Minister did not archive, as required by law, "central emails" with Solberg's husband - about her conflict-of-interest regarding his share trading. The office's knowledge of the affair and thereby the documents, were kept out of public for more than 10 years.

On 30 November, the Standing Committee on Scrutiny and Constitutional Affairs sent 13 more questions to the Office of the Prime Minister, which more specifically asked about record keeping.

== Honours ==
=== National honours ===
- Norway: Commander of the Royal Norwegian Order of Saint Olav (2005)
- Norway: King Harald V's Jubilee Medal 1991–2016 (2016)

Political offices
Preceded by Sylvia Brustad	Minister of Local Government and Regional Development; 2001–2005	Succeeded by Åslaug Haga
Preceded by Jens Stoltenberg	Prime Minister of Norway; 2013–2021	Succeeded by Jonas Gahr Støre
Party political offices
Preceded by Jan Petersen	Leader of the Conservative Party; 2004–2026	Succeeded by Ine Eriksen Søreide
Preceded by Inge Lønning	First Deputy Leader of the Conservative Party; 2002–2004	Succeeded by Per-Kristian Foss
