= Eli Årdal Berland =

Norwegian politician (1952–2025)

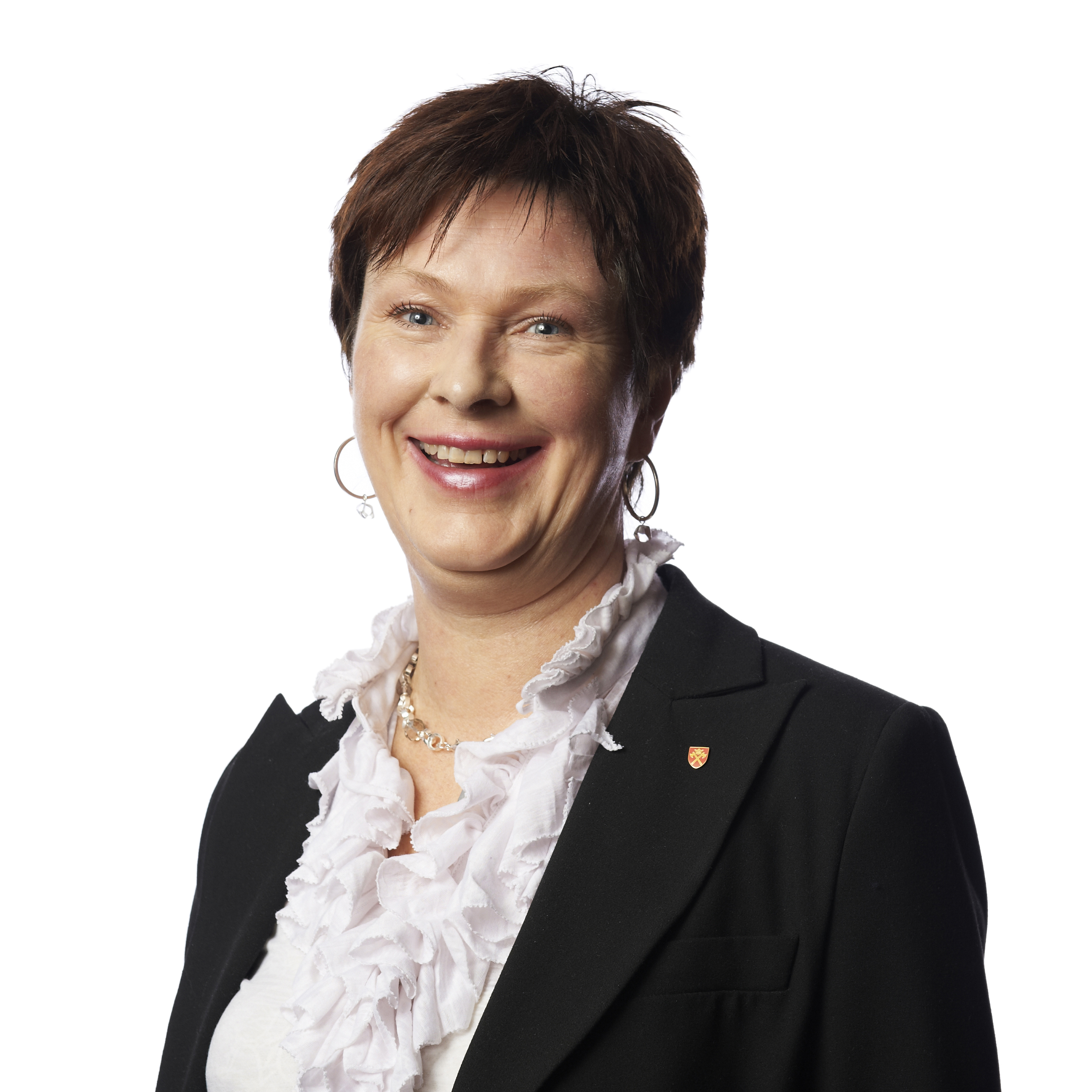
- Berland in 2011

Deputy member of the Storting for Hordaland
- In office 2005–2009

Mayor of Fjell Municipality
- In office 2010–2015
- Preceded by: Lars Lie
- Succeeded by: Marianne Sandahl Bjorøy

Personal details
- Born: March 29, 1952
- Died: September 8, 2025 (aged 73)
- Party: Conservative Party

Eli Årdal Berland (29 March 1952–8 September 2025) was a Norwegian politician who was a deputy member of the Storting for the Conservative Party from 2005 to 2009. She was also the mayor of Fjell Municipality from 2010 to 2015.

== Career ==
Berland first became a member of the municipal council of Fjell Municipality in 1999. From 1999 to 2003, she was head of the council's health and social affairs committee. Berland was also a member of the Hordaland county council.

From 2005 to 2009, Berland was the first deputy member of the Storting for the Hordaland constituency. In October 2005, she was briefly the deputy for Erna Solberg, the leader of the Conservative Party, attending the Storting in her place while she served in the outgoing Second Bondevik cabinet.

In 2010, Berland became mayor of Fjell after the death of incumbent Lars Lie. She was re-elected to the position in 2011, serving until 2015. During her tenure, she supported the establishment of further healthcare facilities in the area and, in 2013, officially opened the Sotra Arena.

== Death ==
Berland died of Alzheimer's disease in a nursing home in September 2025. She was survived by her husband, Jostein Oddvar Berland, who arranged that her funeral would be blue, in reference to her conservative political beliefs. Tom Georg Indrevik, the mayor of Øygarden Municipality, said Berland was "a good ambassador for Fjell Municipality" and that her death was "a great loss".
