= Silja Ekeland Bjørkly =

Norwegian politician (born 1976)

Silja Ekeland Bjørkly (born 22 June 1976 in Bergen) is a Norwegian politician for the Conservative Party.

She served as a deputy representative in the Norwegian Parliament from Hordaland during the term 2001–2005. During this entire term she sat as a regular representative, replacing Erna Solberg who was appointed to the second Bondevik cabinet.

Bjørkly was a deputy member of Bergen city council from 1999 to 2001.
