= Pøbel =

Norwegian artist

Pøbel (Norwegian pronunciation: [ˈpø̀ːbl̩]; ultimately from Latin populus meaning "folk" or "people") is the pseudonym of an anonymous Norwegian artist from Bryne, Norway. His work includes paintings, photographs, sculptures, placemaking and site-specific projects.

== Career ==
He first came to national prominence in Norway in the mid-2000s for decorating abandoned buildings in the Lofoten islands in the north of Norway, bringing an urban street art phenomenon into rural areas and nature, thus sparking a debate on the meaning of "street art". Since then he has been involved in numerous art projects and also successfully released gallery works.

His public art works can be found all over the world; Scandinavia, UK, Iceland, the U.S, India, Thailand, China, Japan, Russia, Peru, and more.

=== Early career ===
Pøbel started by teaching himself stencil techniques and started painting in 1999. Some of his first works appeared in Norway in the city of Stavanger and later Bergen. In 2006, he created some controversy when he spray-painted on a dead sperm whale that had stranded and was rotting on the shore in Eggum, Lofoten. In 2008 he participated in Banksy's Cans Festival exhibition. Pøbel started using the "Pøbel" name when he was a teenager.

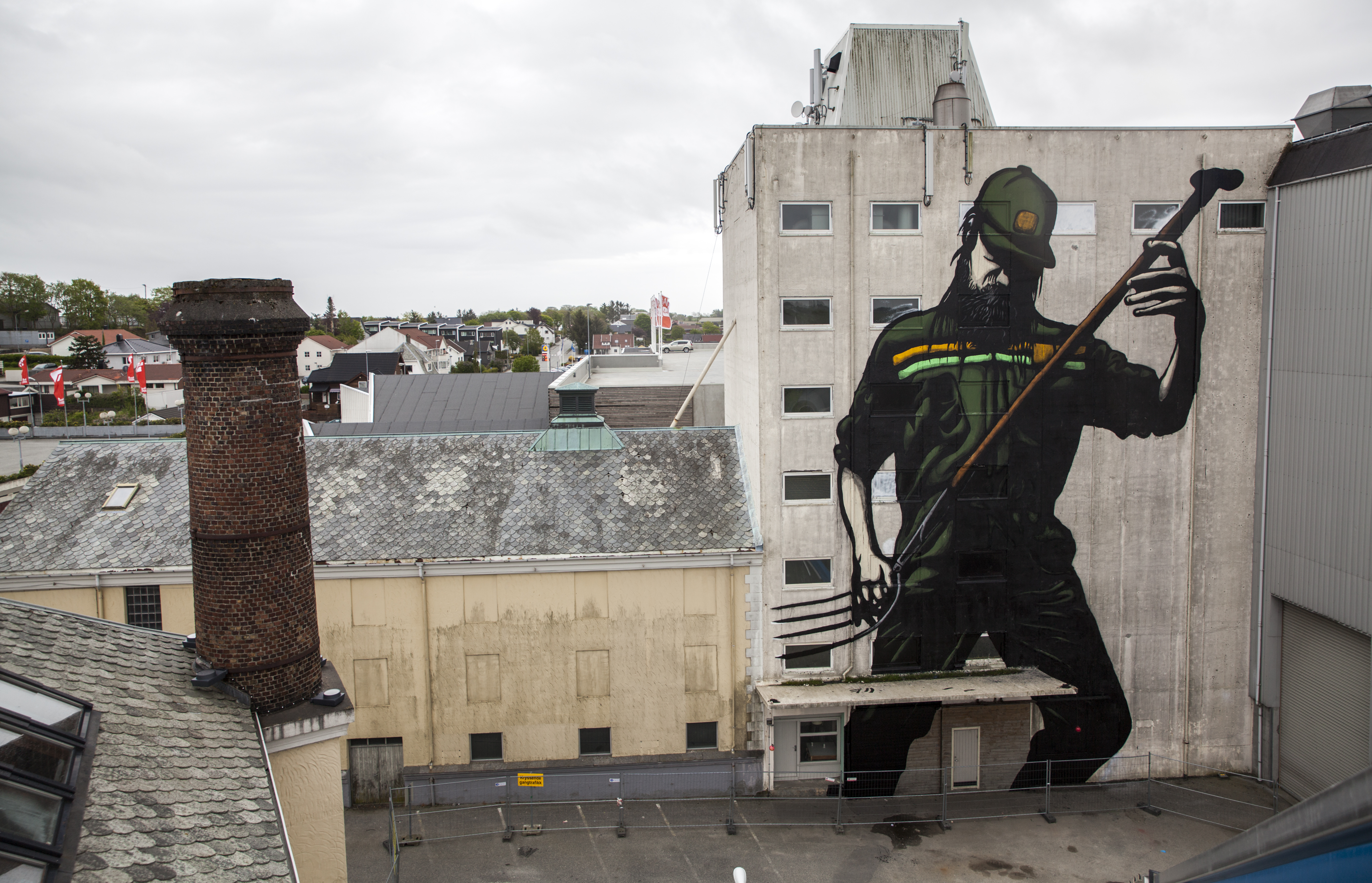
The Stardom Glow (2015) by Pøbel, Bryne, Norway

== Works ==
=== Work in Lofoten ===
In 2006 in Lofoten, he started the art project "Øde dekor" ("Desolate decorations") together with a friend named Olav Kvalnes.

The "Øde dekor" project was originally intended as a situational prank; only one house was painted to start with, then a catalog of abandoned buildings with non-existent art work superimposed on the walls was to be distributed, to lure both tourists and locals to far-away sites where they would only find crumbling old houses. The idea was to make people think about the meaning of the empty buildings and the depopulation of rural northern Norway. Kvalnes' acceptance into architecture school meant the project was never finished. However, Pøbel decided to go ahead on his own and actually paint the houses.

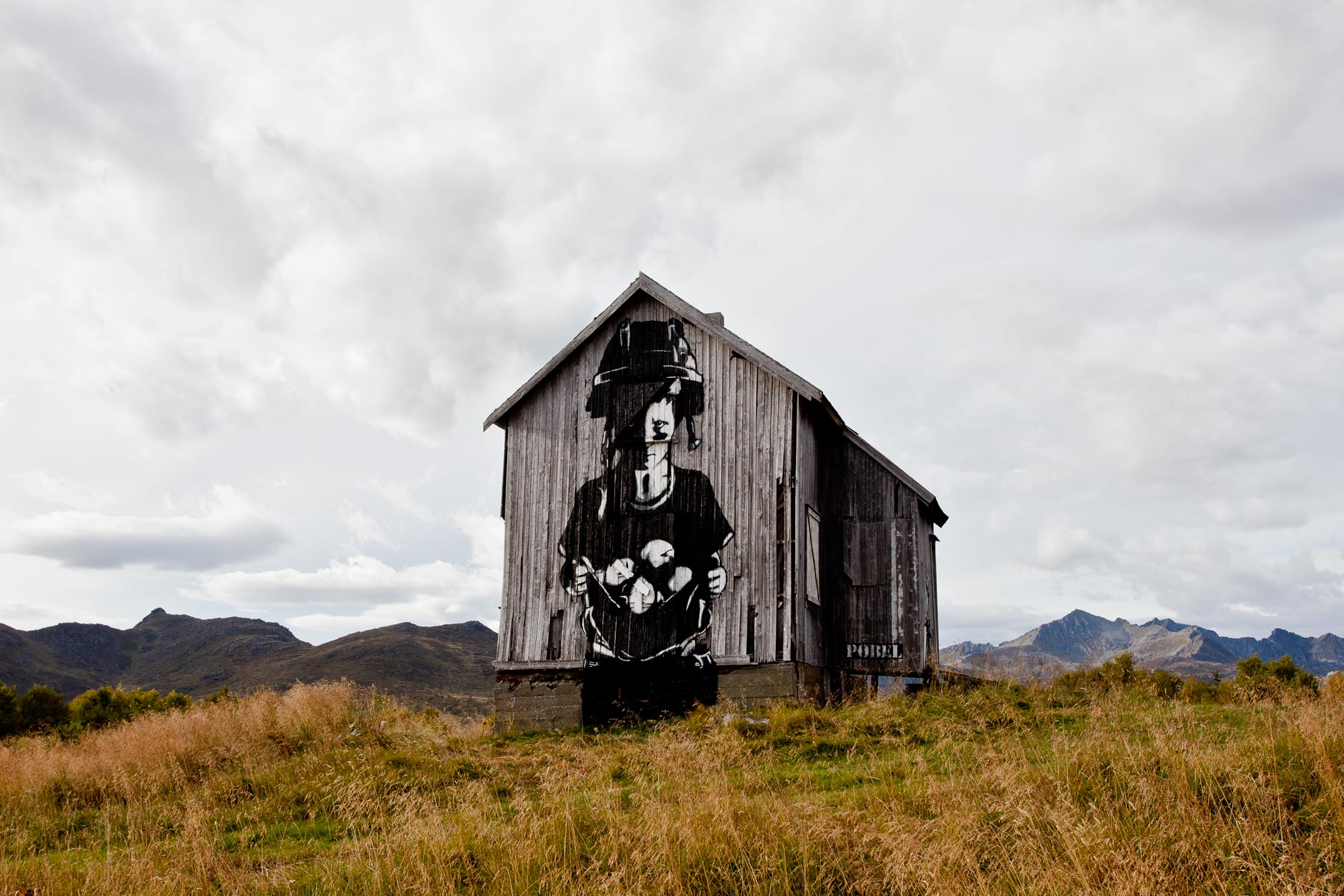
Pøbel - Lofoten, Norway 2010

In 2007 the artist Dolk was invited to help organize the project, which was then renamed "Ghetto spedalsk" ("Ghetto leper"), intended as a major art festival. The idea was to invite more artists to paint several buildings over a short period of time, but practical issues such as the sheer size of the area and the distance between the houses made them call off their plans. However, over the course of a couple of years Pøbel and Dolk painted a dozen houses all over the Lofoten islands.

"Ghetto Spedalsk" has been called "one of the most talked-of art projects in Norway over the last decade". In 2010 Norwegian state broadcaster NRK devoted an entire episode of its weekly art show "Nasjonalgalleriet" to street art and "Ghetto spedalsk". The project also attracted international attention, with a story published in the New York Times and as the subject of the short documentary "Changing landscapes".

One of the concepts of Pøbel's work in Lofoten was that urban art was moved out into the rural area, and nature, which sparked debates about the concept of urban art. In addition, the "overall" concept of the art work sparked huge political debates from the attention it brought to depopulation, and its causes. This project contributed largely to the street art everywhere movement, that later occurred.

One of Pøbels works was stolen and not found yet. Pøbel painted four walls in Vestvågøy Municipality, Norway, but the one of them is missing, and thieves stole whole wall. Pøbel did not looked at this case neither positively nor negatively. Thieves put so much effort and strength to steal it. There are opinions that someone stole the paint for his private collection, or that it is being used for someone else's art.

=== Komafest ===
In July 2012 Pøbel created, along with NNKS (The Artists' Centre of Northern Norway) "Komafest" ("Comaparty"), a continuation of "Øde dekor".Vardø, Norway's northeastern-most town, once named the ugliest city in the country, had suffered a steady decline in population since the 1960s because of a crisis in its fishing industry. With more than 50% of its population being lost, the city was full of abandoned infrastructure, factories and homes in various states of disrepair. Over the course of two weeks abandoned buildings were decorated by dozens of artworks by the participating artists: Stephen Powers (US), Vhils (PT), Roa (BE), Atle Østrem (NO), Claudio Ethos (BR), E. B. Itso (DK), Husk mit navn (DK), Horfe (FR), Ken Sortais (FR), Remed (FR) and Conor Harrington (IE). The name, Komafest, according to Pøbel, played on the notion of "the houses being roused from a slumber".

The project had as a stated goal to involve the local population. Volunteers helped with logistics, equipment and clearing out buildings and areas to be used. The local population was also the inspiration of several of the art work, and one of the biggest walls was set aside for the locals to contribute and create an artwork of their own. The 100 year old municipal cinema, closed for over 20 years and used as a warehouse, was cleared and used to host a lecture by author Tristan Manco and the opening party of the project.

Since Vardø is one of the few localities in Finnmark county to not have been completely destroyed during the German retreat towards the end of World War II, it has many buildings of historical interest. The intermeshing of street art with historical sites sparked debate and controversy, and was the subject of an entire chapter of the 100th anniversary book of the Norwegian Directorate for Cultural Heritage.

As a result, partially of Komafest, several of the abandoned buildings that were painted where actually bought up, renovated and used again. This created an almost self-fulfilling prophecy of the project, with buildings in slumber being awakened again.

Tourism increased as tourists had an interest in seeing the unique art of the city.

=== Flyttebussen ("Moving bus") ===
At the end of the festival Pøbel together with a local entrepreneur (sponsored by Koro/Uro) erected an old bus next to the underwater tunnel that leads to Vardø. The bus had belonged to the only moving agency in the city, and been used to transport several families and their belongings out of the town during the years of steep population decline. Schools and local organizations were invited to contribute to a time capsule full of letters, local newspapers, DVDs and other artifacts, which was sealed and buried inside the bus not to be opened for 50 years.

The mayor of Vardø Lasse Haughom, appreciating the symbolism of the buried bus, personally thanked Pøbel in national media. He hoped the bus would symbolize an end to people leaving the town.

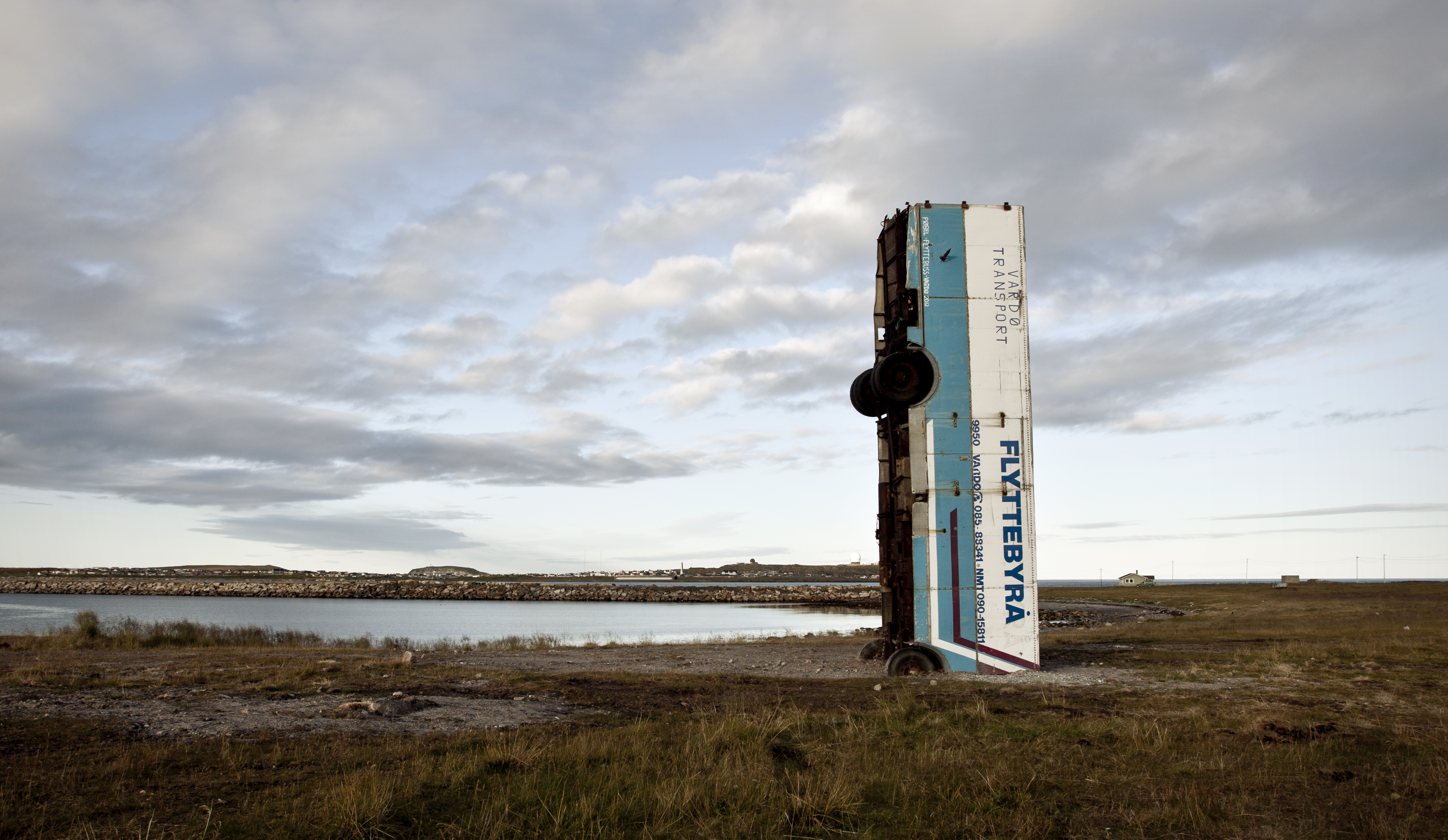
Moving bus (Flyttebussen) by Pøbel, Vardø, Norway

=== The Blood Bank ===
After having done art work on the outside of buildings, Pøbel started focusing on the inside of buildings moving from urban art into installation art. One of the main streets in Vardø had several closed down stores that were always dark. When walking down the main street during winter times when there was absolutely no sun during daytime, there is not only complete darkness from the lack of the sun, but also from the closed down stores. Many of the closed down stores, were not necessarily abandoned because of the depopulation, but from politics. Investors buying up properties, to secure and later move out fish quotas, investors speculating in potential oil boom etc. caused many properties to be decayed due to investment politics. Typically the owners of these properties were not located in Vardø, and locals in Vardø could not buy, use or restore these properties.

In reality, the politics had not only caused a depopulation, but had also made the city lose its own blood or life force. With the locals involved once again, Pøbel bought a closed-down flower-shop and renovated the space to create an exhibition called The Blood Bank, and the store was made to look like a proper white cubed gallery. In media Vardø was often described as a ghost town, so the blood bank wanted to focus more on the lives of the people living there. The exhibition became a metaphor of the locals being the blood that keeps the city alive.

Instead of inviting external artists to create the content of the exhibition, the locals were invited to create their own art, about themselves. 150 canvases and red markers were handed out personally by Pøbel to different local citizens that each contributed with their paintings. Kindergartens, retirement homes, the local pub and several other locations were covered to capture the "full spectrum" of the locals.

The exhibition showcases the entire creative process as an art form in itself. An abandoned store, dormant for 20 years, has now become a space where locals come together to celebrate their stories and showcase their own artwork.

The Blood Bank was also a pilot for a larger intended project where ten closed down stores should be renewed, involving ten installation artists creating site-specific work.

The Blood bank is subject of the upcoming short documentary "Blood bank".

=== Komafest new chapter ===
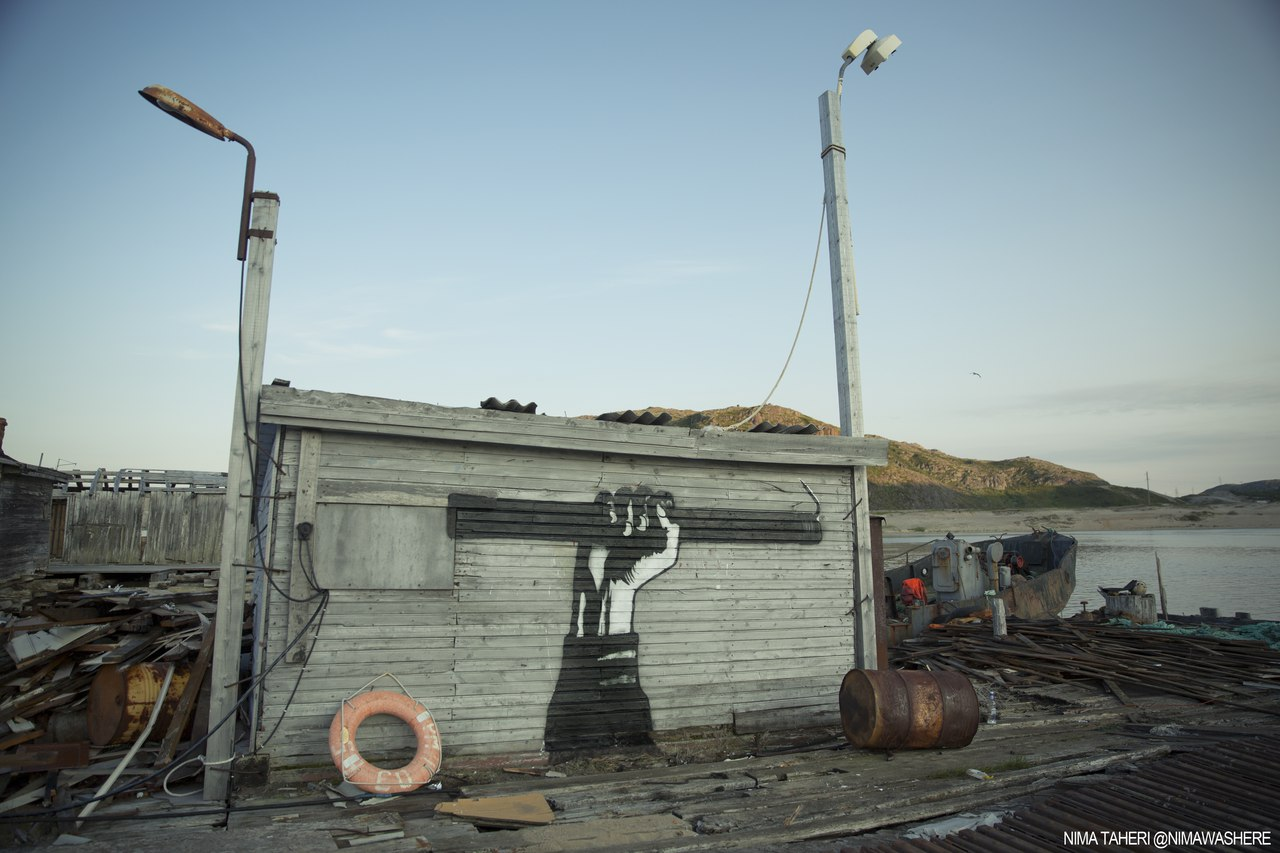
Pøbel - Teriberka, Russia (2015)

Komafest New Chapter took place in Teriberka, an old fishing village on the north coast of the Kola Peninsula in Russia. Teriberka is an even more extreme version of Vardø and has over the last 30 years Teriberka 90% of its population, mostly due to centralization and privatization of fishing, just like Vardø. In 2018 the remaining majority of the population was forced to move to other places, like Lodeinoje and Kola, to create space and room for development of tourism.

In 2015 Pøbel was invited to Teriberka to share with the locals about experiences from the Komafest project in Vardø. He went together with photographer Nima Taheri to document similarities between Teriberka and Vardø. He saw that the politics that created the downfall of Teriberka was happening in Norway as well, but at a much slower pace. This made him feel that that Teriberka was a 20-30 year future scenario for the north coast of Norway. During his first time in Teriberka he created 12 site-specific paintings. During this time Pøbel also got the idea of building a mobile, self-serving library that would consist of recycled materials, and personal items from abandoned homes.

In 2016 Pøbel and Vardø Restored joined again and traveled to Teriberka together to evaluate the possibility of doing a project there.

In 2017 a project was started and the mobile library idea became a realization when an old Ural truck was made into a mobile library by using collected materials and personal items from 50 abandoned homes of families that had been forced to move. The truck was completed, and it works, and the truck itself has been on a display in Oslo, Norway.

The project involved more than 170 people from Norway and Russia during the time from 2015 to 2019. The locals in Teriberka participated in several ways, and contributed with thousands of hours of voluntary work.

Different academics has also written case studies about Teriberka, as a result of the project.

=== MUTE ===
Mute is an ongoing concept that Pøbel has been exploring and developing for almost a decade.

In 2011 Pøbel noticed that several of his paintings that were located in rural areas had an interesting paradox because most people saw pictures of the paintings, instead of the paintings themselves. This made him question the dynamics of being a painter versus being a photographer. Was the photo a documentation of the painting, or was the painting a staged element to create photo as an art work in itself?

In 2012 he started spray-painting, his now famous, mute icon in different locations in nature.

In 2013 in Denmark the mute icon was used on old cars that were dropped from heights in order to capture pictures of objects right before a destructive impact.

In 2014 Pøbel's now famous mute icon appeared on the streets in Tokyo, Japan.

In 2015 in Guangzhou in China, the mute icon was used on several buildings in a slum area surrounded by modern skyscrapers. The symbol was used here to support the local population in their protest against big investors wanting to buy up the whole area and turn it into something new and modern. However, during the process of muting several buildings, some locals thought Pøbel was from the government, marking which buildings should be demolished. Pøbel and his crew were chased by 20 fully uniformed guards wearing helmets and carrying batons.

In April 2016 Pøbel spray-painted the symbolic "mute" icon on Donald Trump's star on the Hollywood Walk of Fame in Los Angeles. Millions watched a video clip of this on YouTube the first day it was published.

Pøbel declined interview with several news outlets about the Donald Trump mute, wanting to leave it open for interpretation, but commented that this was part of a larger ongoing concept.

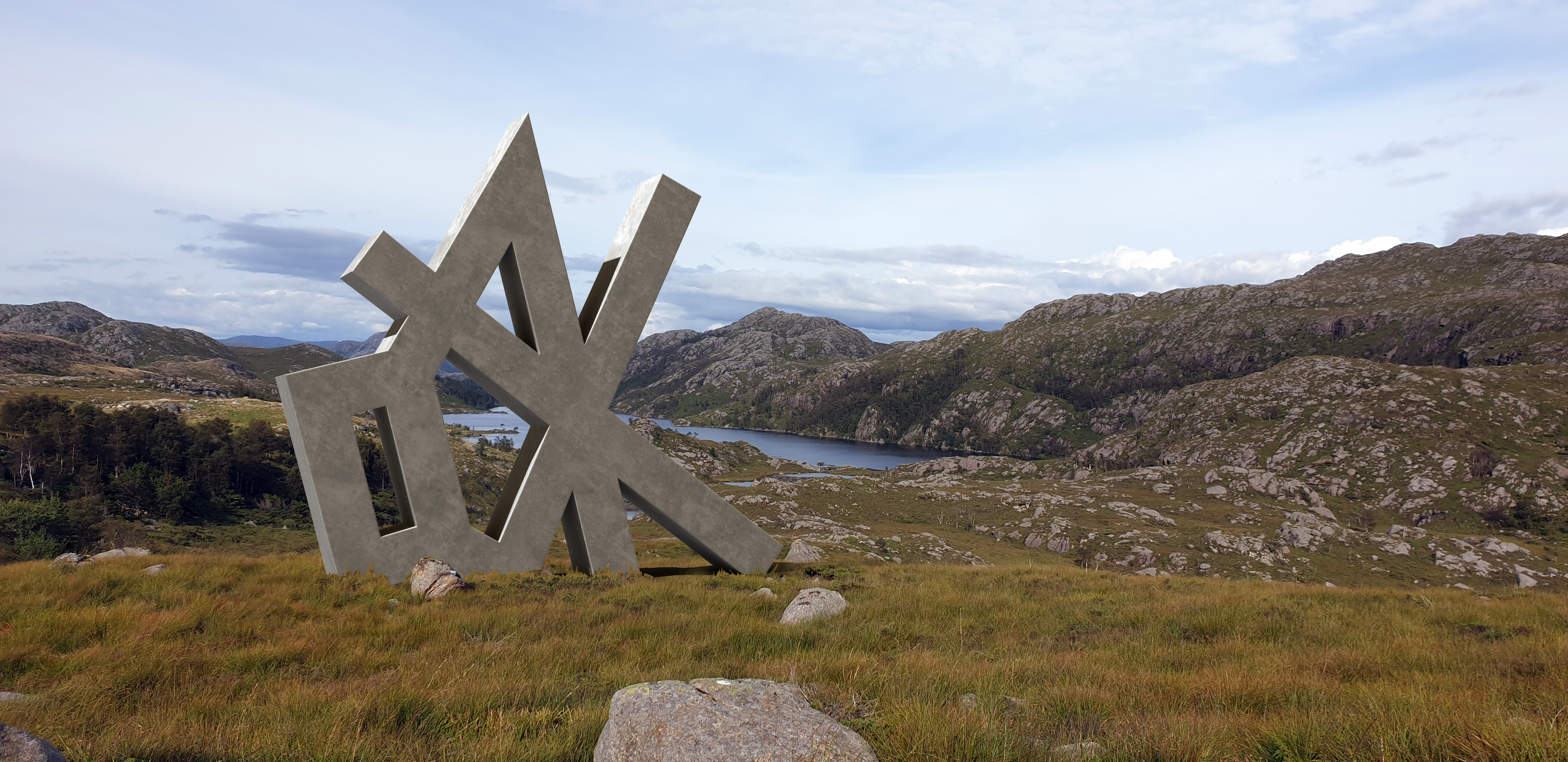
An illustration of what could become Pøbel's latest addition to his Mute concept.

Since then, his mute icon has appeared in various locations around the world, including Japan, India, Russia, Peru and Norway.

In late 2020 he started working on creating a big sculpture if the mute icon to be placed in nature in Norway.

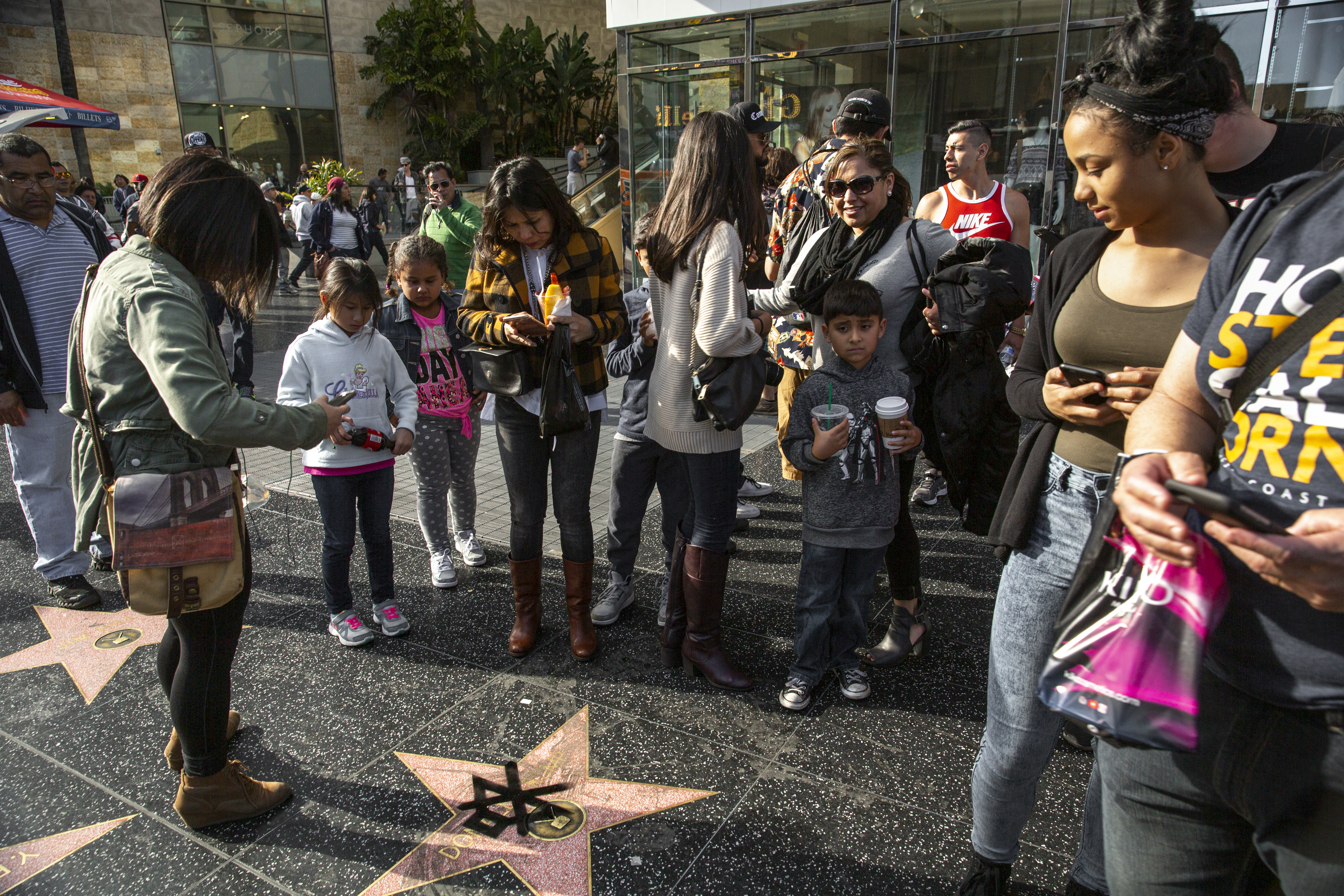
MUTE, by Pøbel (Photo by Nima Taheri)

== Other notable works ==
In addition to the several projects Pøbel has created, he also does stencils and installations. He has sold much of his works online since 2012. Pøbel has a philosophy that his art must be available for everyone, also those who cannot afford to buy it. Many of his prints or paintings have originally appeared on buildings, in nature or in cities. He has limited releases, and often sells much below market price.

=== The Lovers ===
"The Lovers" appeared on a wall under the railway in Bryne, March 12, 2020 the day before Norway announced its pandemic lockdown. In May "The Lovers" was released on prints and a few canvas. The Lovers sparked much interested and also appeared in New York Times, in addition to several other medias. The release consisted of 328 items and was sold out in a matter of a minute. Buyers were from all over the world, including India, Hong Kong, the U.S., Middle East, and Norway.

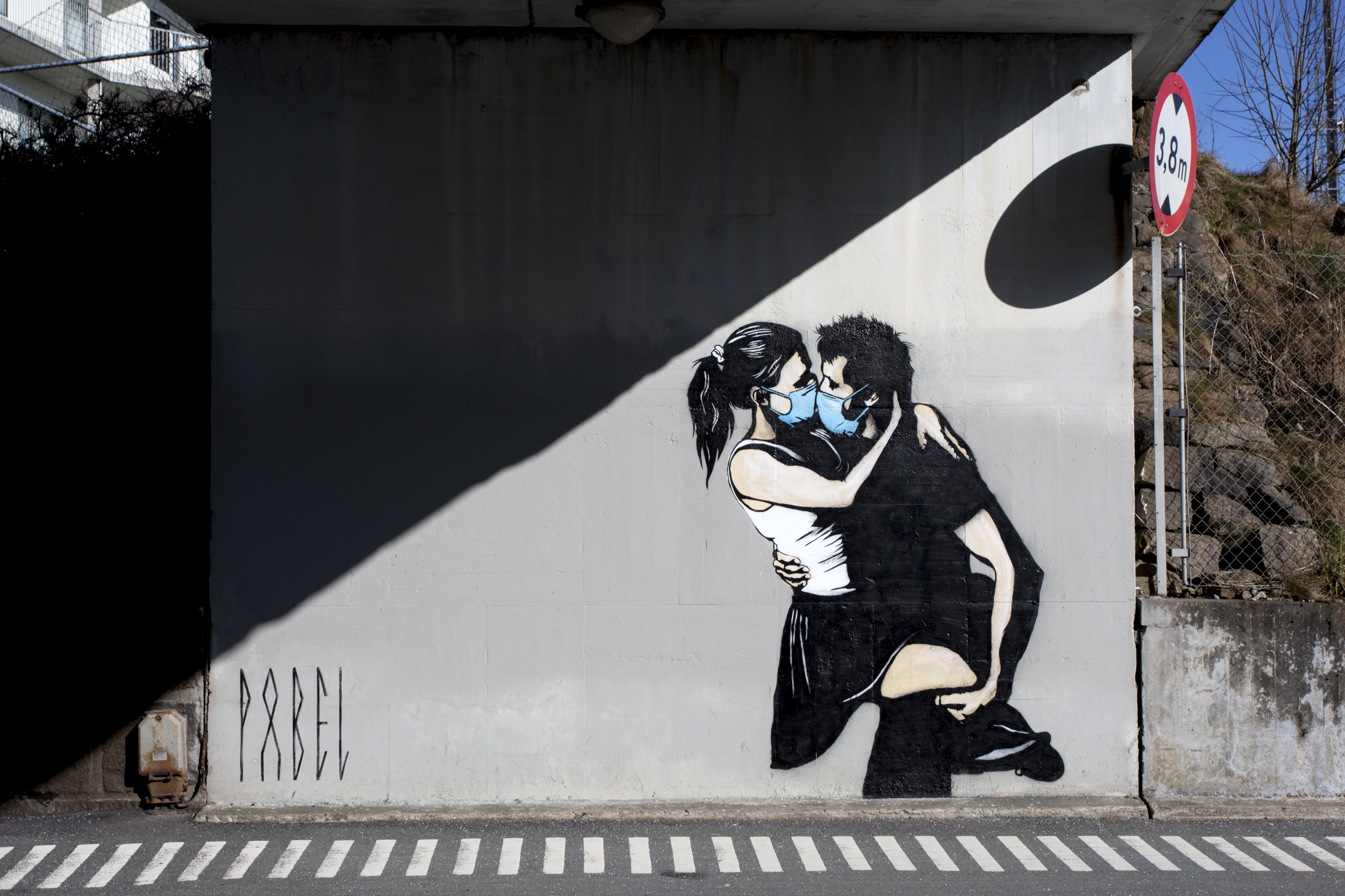
The Lovers by Pøbel, Bryne, Norway

An AP (artist proof) of "The Lovers" were put up for auction to raise charity money to support indigenous people in the Amazon, suffering during the COVID-19 pandemic. The AP was sold for $11 000 to a person in Los Angeles, California.

Some prints of "The Lovers" were also donated to a local charity organization named Ønsketransporten and put up for sale. All income would go to the organization and their work to provide transport and experiences for people who are seriously sick or with strong handicaps.

=== NFT ===
In closed bikini factory at Figgjo in Rogaland, the artist Pøbel sprayed petrol on The Lovers painting. Worth of the painting is more than 300.000 Norwegian kroner.

Before Pøbel sprayed petrol and burned up his artwork, the picture has been photographed by professional photographer in high resolution and digitalised. The file will be put up for sale in digital market. Pøbels plan was that his artwork disappear in physical world and become Crypto Art or Non- Fungible Token (NFT). NFT is digital certificate of ownership and it proves that something is real, and it shows that someone specifically owns the artwork. The artwork can be sold to someone else, and every time someone sells it, the artist gets percentage of the sale.

For Pøbel, the process of burning up the artwork is not just “destroying”, but the art itself. It is exploring of boundaries between digital and physical world.

=== Trump satire ===
On Saturday October 31, 2020 on Halloween, Pøbel displayed a satire of Donald Trump on some 54-meter-tall (177 ft) silos in Stavanger. The animation displayed was of Donald Trump marching on a giant penis-horse, and was inspired by a satire from the 18th century during the French revolution.

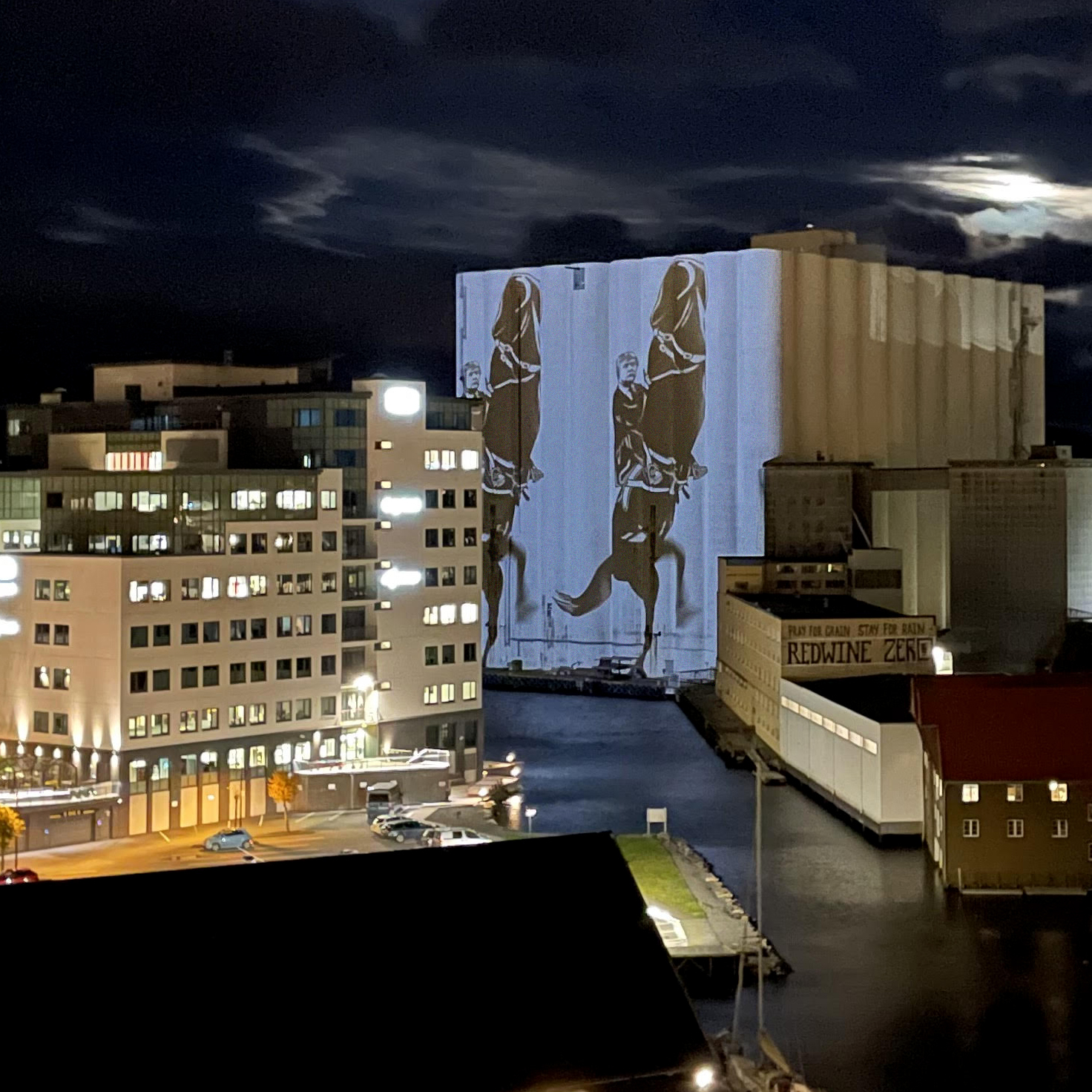
Horsepower by Pøbel, Stavanger, Norway (Photo by Bright Skrettingland)

=== Hidden QR code message ===
On December 16, 2020, a "Thank you" Christmas card was sent out to 30 000 health care workers from their employer, Helse-Vest ("Health-West") in Norway. The motive of the card was made by Pøbel, and it also contained a QR code. The QR led the user to Pøbels website, but soon after the card had been delivered out, Pøbel redirected the QR code and announced this on his Instagram. The QR code then displayed a video where actor Per Kjerstad delivered a message on Pøbel's behalf. The message contained criticism to the healthcare system pointing out it was negatively affected by New Public Management making it too bureaucratic and money-focused, at the expense of the regular worker and their rights.

The employer of the health workers was not aware of this message, but stated that freedom of speech is important and also that they were very content with the photograph on the card. The receivers of the card felt that Pøbel was spot on with his criticism and one nurse stated that she wished Bent Høie, the Norwegian Minister of Health would watch Pøbel's video.

This QR code stunt has become part of the national curriculum for all high school seniors in Norway. The students are asked to analyze the QR code message, the way it was done, the ethical sides regarding it, and the way of communication.

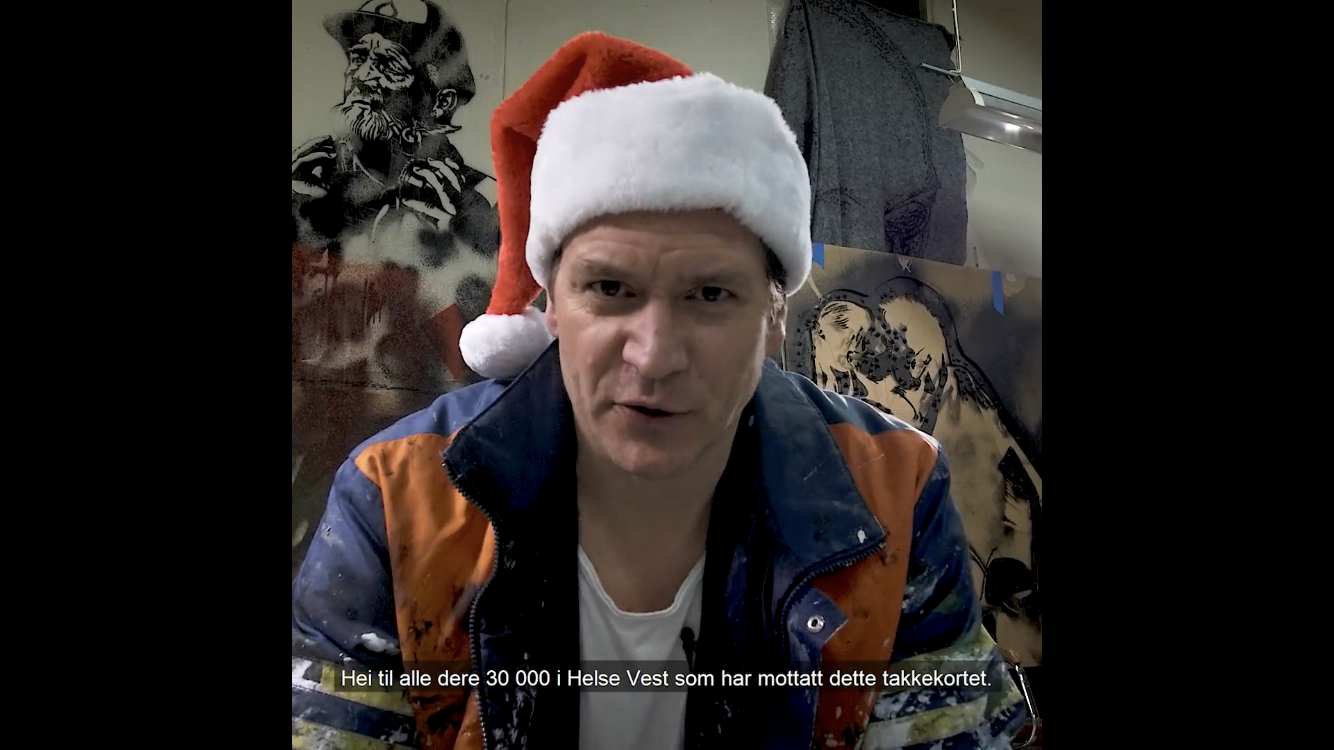
"Thank you" Christmas card for 30 000 health care workers, insert

=== Dirty Dancing ===
On February 11, 2021, Pøbel decorated a big concrete wall close to the hospital in Stavanger. The painting was inspired by the movie "Dirty Dancing" and showed the Minister of Health, Bent Høie, as Patrick Swayze lifting up a health care worker wearing full protective gear. The Minister of Health interpreted the art as him, as a representative of the people, lifting up the healthcare workers and praising them for their efforts during the pandemic. Pøbel stated that the location close to the hospital was not a coincidence, and that this was a way for him as an artist to give.

There are divided opinions about this artwork. Some think that the artwork is the tribute to the Minister of Health Bent Høie, and some that the artwork criticizes him.

The first opinion is that Bent Høie is represented as one of the heroes, just like Johnny Castle in the movie “Dirty Dancing”. Bent is a representative of health workers and he has also worked day and night during the COVID-19 epidemic, which shows that he is not a boss but a leader. The second opinion stands for the exactly opposite. Bent Høie gets criticized through good irony, it shows that there is a lack of pay rise for health workers. The artwork can contain criticism and hidden political messages.

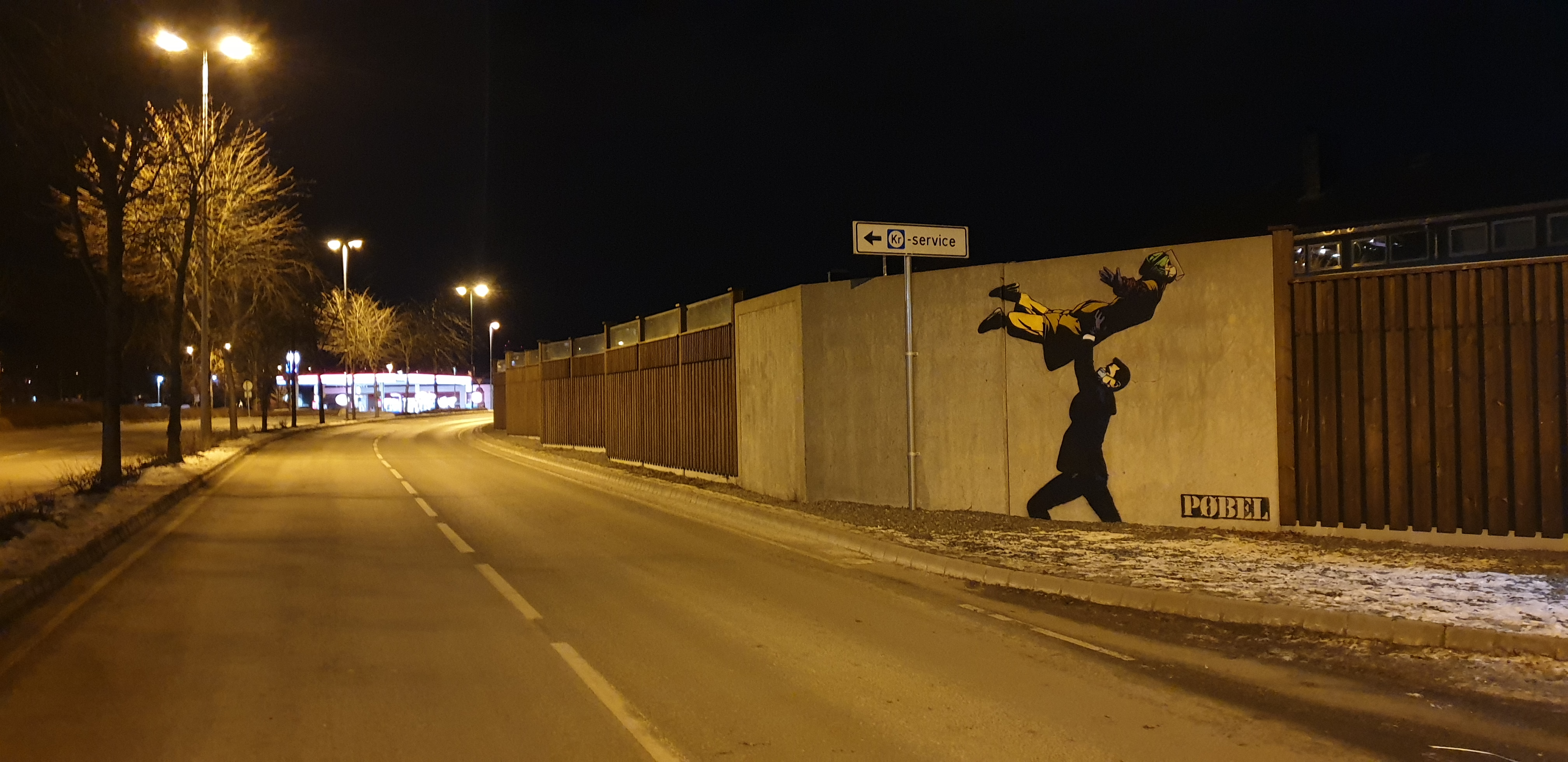
Dirty Dancing by Pøbel, Stavanger, Norway

==== Prints of the "Dirty dancing" motif ====
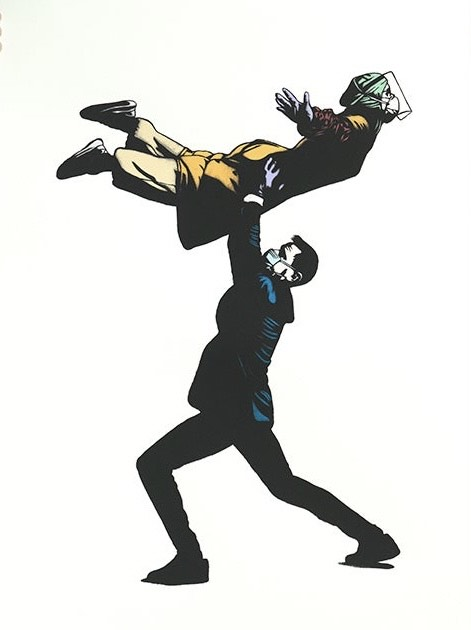
Print of the "Dirty dancing" motif

Pøbel has made about 250 prints of his work "Dirty dancing". First half of the prints were given to all of the hospitals in Norway as sign of gratefulness towards healthcare workers. The worth of given prints is 135,000 dollars. The other half of prints was sold, together with other of his canvas in lottery, where was the half of total amount (250,000 dollars) donated to healthcare workers in Norway. The rest of the money will be spent on new studio and big drinking water project in the Amazon jungle for indigenous people who live there.

=== Barn cut in two ===
It is already mentioned that Pøbel works as an anonymous artist, so his arts shows up unexpectedly. Barn cut in two appeared by the road Fylkesveg 44. The landowner gave Pøbel permission to fulfil his idea. He painted Egon Olsen who laughs with a cigar holding a chainsaw, there also writes “Efficiency” (Effektivisering) on the paint. This time Pøbel wanted to draw attention to Norwegian agriculture. About 10 000 farms disappeared from 2007 to 2017. The farmers thanked to Pøbel, for putting the effort to aware people about what is happening to agricultural life in Norway.

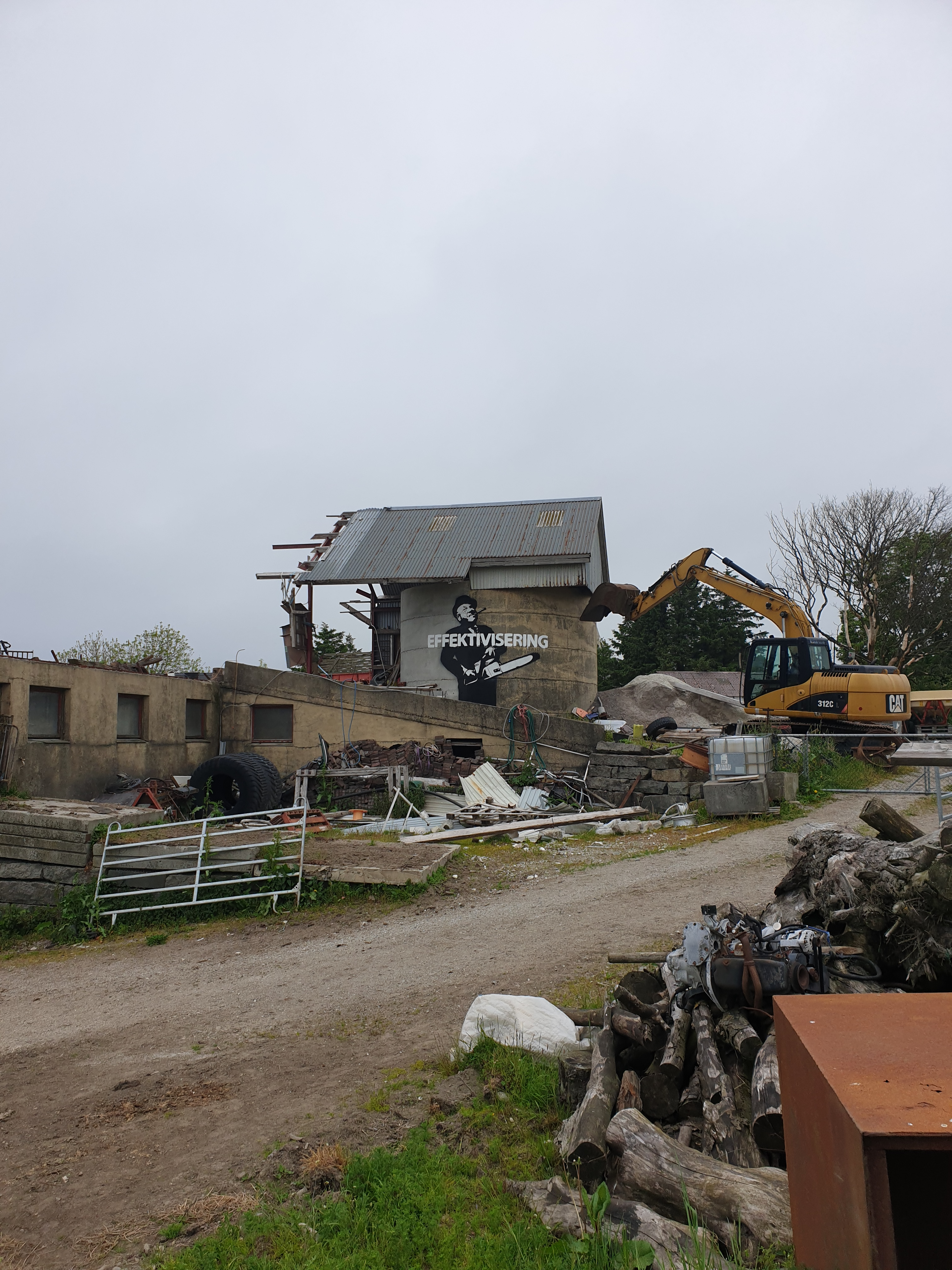
Barn cut in two by Pøbel

== Awards ==
=== Honorary Award from the Municipality of Time ===
On March 20, 2022, Pøbel received the 2021 Honorary Award from Time Municipality.

The artist, who remains anonymous, sent a little girl dressed as a fantasy character to receive the award.
