= Dolk (artist) =

Norwegian artist

- Born: Andreas Hamran Færø; 1979 (age 46–47); Bergen, Norway
- Known for: Stencil graffiti Street art
- Movement: Social commentary
- Website: www.dolk.no

Dolk (meaning dagger in Norwegian) (Dolk Lundgren), is the pseudonym of Norway's most recognized stencil artist, Andreas Hamran Færø. His motifs are often pop-cultural references put into a humorous or critical context. Dolk's works can be seen on walls in cities such as Bergen, Berlin, Copenhagen, Barcelona, Oslo, Lisbon, Stockholm, London, Prague and Melbourne. Since 2006, Dolk has stepped into galleries where he has had several exhibitions.

== Biography ==
=== Career ===
Dolk was born in Bergen, Norway, in 1979 and started with stencil art in 2003. Dolk has education from mechanic courses in Bergen, and has studied graphic design in Melbourne. Dolk claims he was inspired by the British street artist Banksy to start with stencil art. Dolk started with stencil art in Bergen in 2003, where several of his works still are visible on walls in the city. He soon started travelling the world, and in London people have mistaken Dolk's works for being art by Banksy. Dolk has made stencil art in many cities. After a while Dolk wanted to take his art into more legal forms and he has since 2006 participated in exhibitions and art festivals all over the world. In 2008 Dolk and Pøbel created the project "Ghetto Spedalsk" in Lofoten, northern Norway. The goal was to move the urban art form into no man's land by painting 20 stencils on abandoned houses. In 2010 Dolk made three works of art for the opening of Halden prison, the art covers the walls in the exercise yard. In 2010 Dolk and Pøbel were paid by the Norwegian state to put their art up at the main railway stations in Oslo and Trondheim. In 2011 Dolk held his first separate exhibition in Oslo at the OSL Contemporary gallery where he sold out all 9 canvases for £12500 each. In 2011 Dolk was one of several street artists that got to decorate the walls at the Norwegian School of Economics as part of the project "…………CAPITALISM?"and many more like in Oslo. Dolk sells his works through the Bergen-based website handmadeposters.com, and in 2011, 250 copies of the print "Mushroom Girl" were sold out in 40 minutes. In 2012 he sold the prints "TOY" and "Winner" for over £110000 in less than two minutes. In 2012, Dolkblog.com was established; the unofficial fansite covers news, artwork, information etc. about the artist.

=== Exhibitions and festivals ===
- 2004, "Dolk vs. Strøk", Tilsammans, Bergen, Norway.
- 2005, "Unge(s) spor", USF Verftet, Bergen, Norway.
- 2006, "Santa`s Ghetto", 15 Oxford Street, London, England.
- 2006, "NuArt Festival", Stavanger, Norway.
- 2007, "Difusor", Barcelona, Spain.
- 2007, "Nuart Festival", Stavanger, Norway.
- 2008, "The Cans Festival", London, England.
- 2008, "Urban Affairs: Streetart and Urban Art Exhibition", Berlin, Germany.
- 2008, "Nuart Festival", Stavanger, Norway.
- 2008, "Graffle 2", Bristol, England.
- 2008, "Saints & Sinners", Soho, England.
- 2008, "Ghetto Spedalsk", Lofoten, Norway.
- 2009, "Fame Festival", Grottaglie, Italy.
- 2010, "BGO1", Bergen, Norway.
- 2010, "Nuart Festival", Stavanger, Norway.
- 2010, "Brooklynite Gallery", New York City, United States.
- 2011, "OSL Contemporary", Oslo, Norway.
- 2012, "…………CAPITALISM?", Norwegian School of Economics, Bergen, Norway.

== Art ==
=== Dolk or Banksy? ===
Early in Dolk's career, it was speculated that Dolk was a pseudonym for the well-known British graffiti artist Banksy. The two artists have several stylistic similarities, and especially Banksy's work "Puppy Love" from 2005 has been pointed out as resembling Dolk. Dolk made his own version of this work where both the name and the colors were identical with the original.

=== Famous works ===
The work "Che" from 2007 shows a cigar-smoking Che Guevara proudly pointing at his own t-shirt with the iconic portrait from 1960 taken by Alberto Korda of himself. Dolk's stencil is distinguished by many as the ultimate copy of this portrait, that after Che Guevara's death was pirate-copied, creating an enormous turnover. The stencil has been sold as the prints "Che" and "Che XL". The well-known street art website "Pictures on Walls" sold Dolk's "Che" as postcards in 2006.

The work "Burger King" from 2006 portrays Prince Charles in a birthday crown in paper from Burger King.

The work "Spray" is a twist on the iconic picture taken by Eddie Adams during the Vietnam War where general Nguyễn Ngọc Loan executes the Vietcong prisoner of war Nguyễn Văn Lém with a head shot. Dolk has exchanged the head with a flower, and the revolver with a spray bottle. In Bergen, this work was preserved in 2009 by the local government framing it in protective glass.

The project "Ghetto Spedalsk" in 2008 was a collaboration between Dolk and Pøbel where the goal was to move street art into no man's land. They painted several stencils on 20 abandoned houses in Lofoten, northern Norway. The project got wide international attention.

== See also ==
- List of street artists
- List of stencil artists
- Glossary of graffiti
