= Erik Skutle =

Norwegian politician (born 1990)

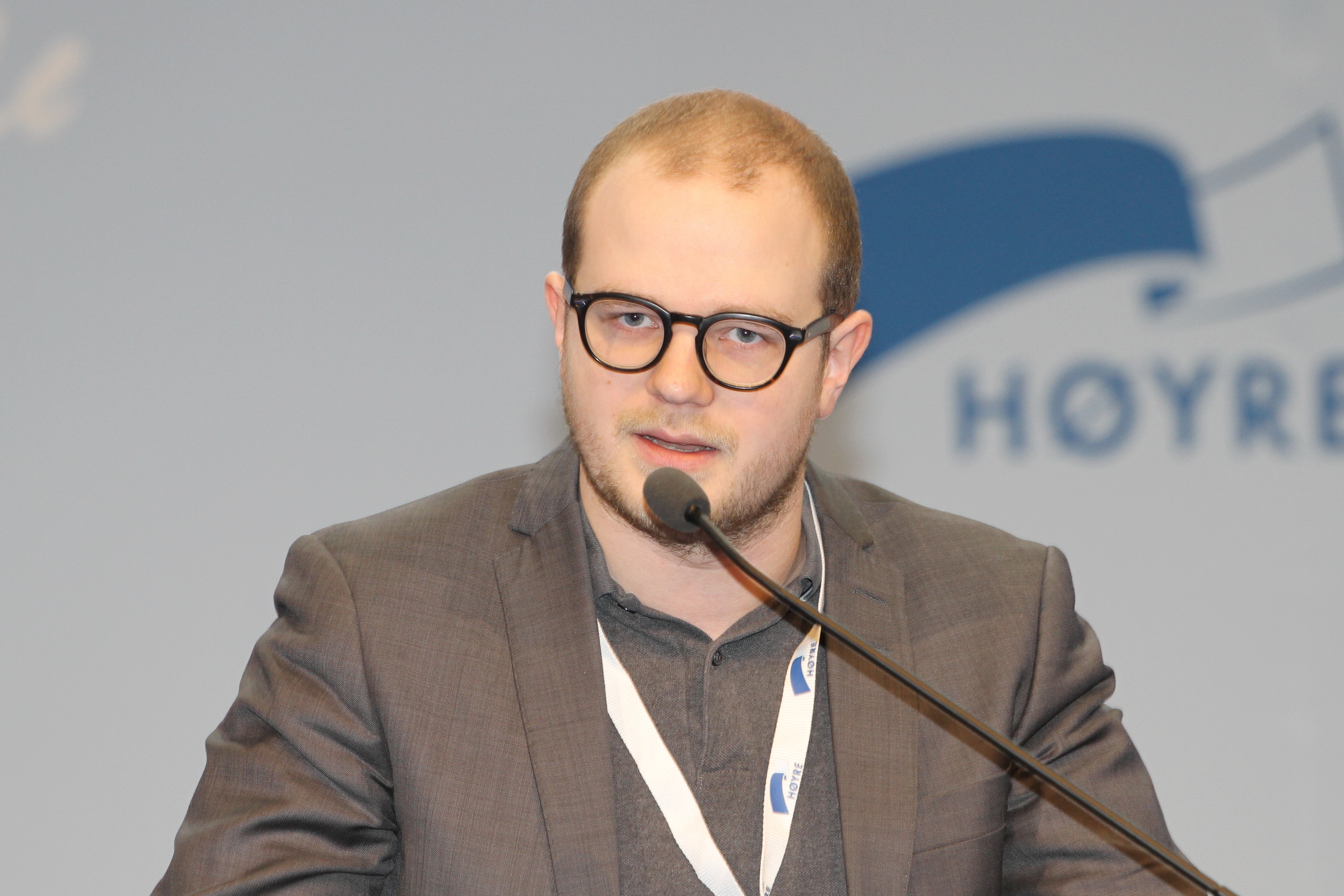
- Born: 7 January 1990 (age 36)
- Occupation: Politician
- Known for: Member of the Storting

Erik Skutle (born 7 January 1990) is a Norwegian politician for the Conservative Party. He was elected as deputy to the Parliament of Norway from Hordaland in 2013. He meets as deputy for Erna Solberg, and is member of the Standing Committee on Scrutiny and Constitutional Affairs.

On 27 February 2014, Skutle was one of several people arrested in Bergen by Norwegian police on drug charges. He was charged with, and confessed to, using cannabis. The day before his arrest, Skutle had spoken out in the newspaper VG in favour of legalising cannabis. Following the charges, Skutle resigned from all his party posts.
