= Government.no =

Official website of the Norwegian government

- Government.no on 3 January 2024.
- Website type: Web portal
- Available in: Norwegian, Northern Sámi, English
- Owner: Government Administration Services
- Creator: Government of Norway
- Website: www.regjeringen.no/en/id4/
- Launched: 12 February 2007

Government.no (Norwegian: Regjeringen.no, Northern Sami: Ráđđehus.no) is the web portal for the Government of Norway. Operated by the Government Administration Services, it provides a range of information services related to each of the ministries, the Office of the Prime Minister, historical information and a large backlog of public documents.

The site was launched on 12 February 2007, replacing the former odin.dep.no site.
